= Wooden boats of World War II =

United States wooden boats used in World War II

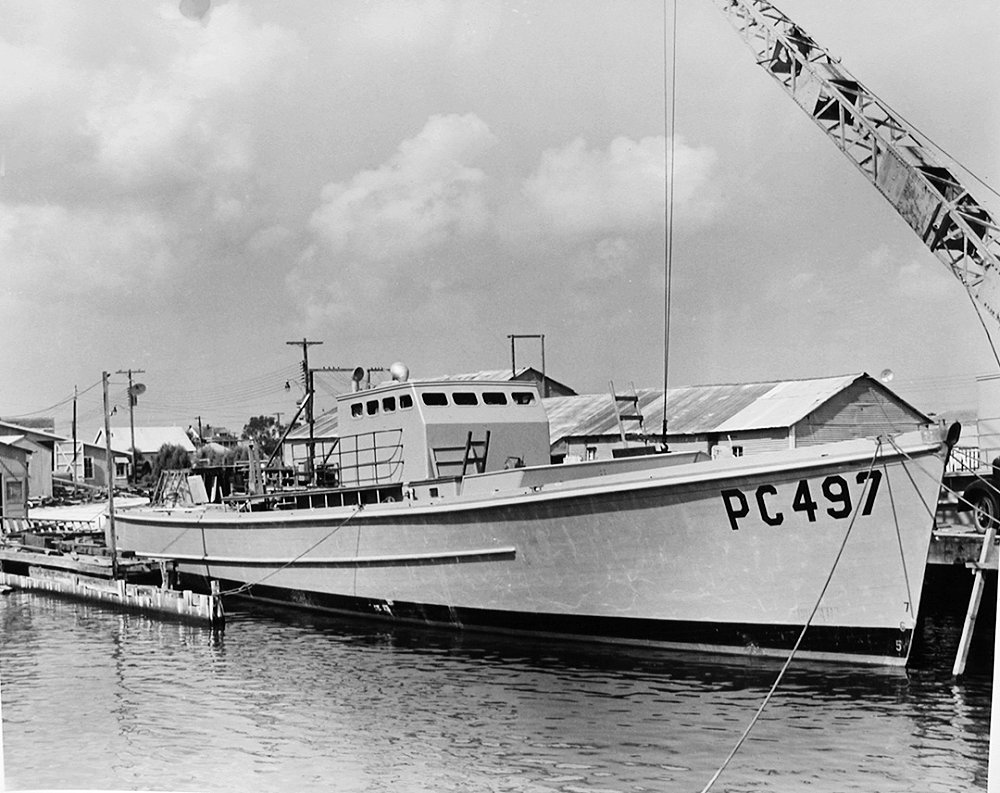
USN wooden subchaser SC-497, first of its class of subchaser that served in World War II

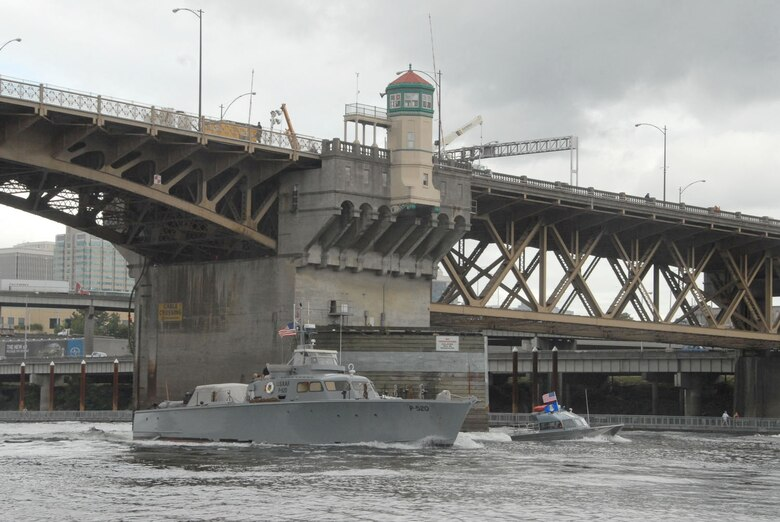
85-foot wooden crash boat P-520 on the Willamette River in Portland in 2007

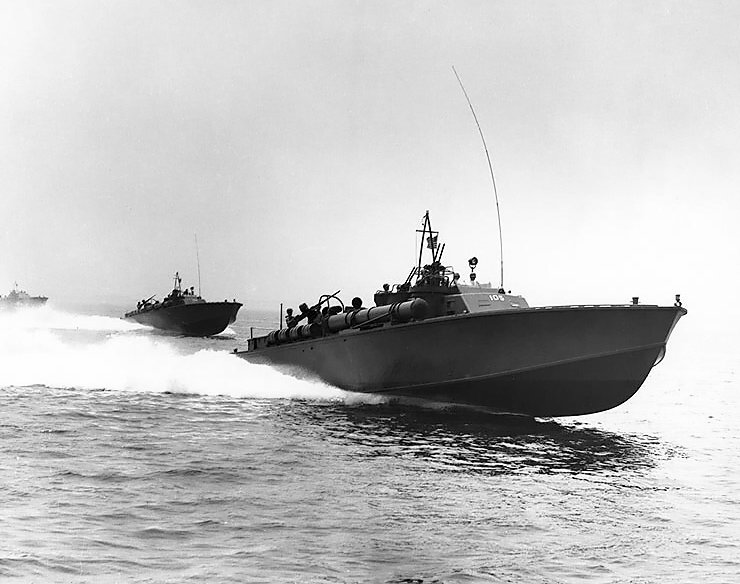
PT-105 underway

Splinter fleet or Splinter navy was a nickname given to the United States wooden boats used in World War II. The boats served in many different roles during the war. These boats were built in small boatyards on the West coast and East coast, Great Lakes and the Gulf of Mexico. They could be built quickly, in just 60 to 120 days. Most of the boats were built by boatyards that already had the tools and knowledge from building yachts, sailboats and motor boats. Many were built by craftsmen in family-owned small businesses. Under the Emergency Shipbuilding Program and War Shipping Administration contracts went out to over fifty boatyards across the country. The boats were built for the US Navy, the United States Army Air Forces, United States Coast Guard, and US Army. Some of the wooden boats went to Allied nations on the Lend-Lease program.

In addition to new boat construction, some wooden boats built between 1910 and 1941 were acquired for the war effort, some used as-is and others converted for war use. Wooden boats have lighter weight and are easier to repair than steel hull boats. These wooden boats ranged from 19 to 200 feet in length. Some worked near shore and others working in the open ocean, called the Blue-water navy. The Splinter fleet is in contrast to the more common steel hull war ships and Merchant Marine ships. After the war, many of these boats were deemed not needed. Many were abandoned or destroyed, a few served in the Korean War and a few in the Vietnam War, some sold to private owners and some donated. During World War I there was a debate as to if wooden boats and ships should be used in war time. William Denman, President of the Emergency Fleet Corporation, supported the building of wooden ships for the war while General Goethals disapproved. In the end, both men turned in their resignation over the heated debate. During World War II the situation was different. There was a shortage of steel and steel shipyards, so there was no debate about the need for a vast wooden fleet of boats and ships.

== Submarine chaser ==
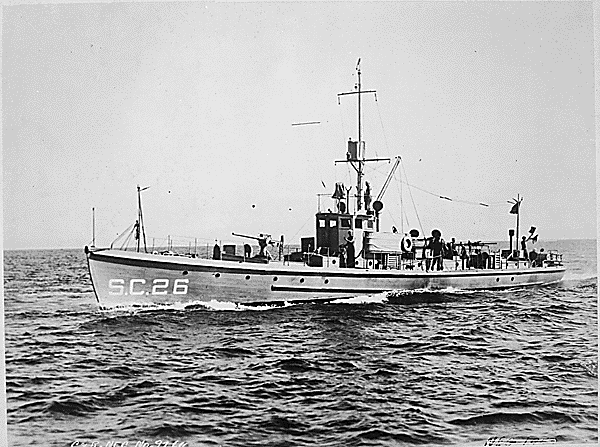
Submarine chaser USS SC-26

Submarine chasers (hull designation "SC") were built to combat the threat U-boats put on merchant convoys as they departed American ports to support the Allies. These are wooden 110-foot (34 m) and 98 tons boats used in anti-submarine warfare. By the time the war ended 438 sub chasers had been launched and commissioned. US Navy boats were armed with one 3"/50 caliber gun, one Bofors 40 mm gun, three Oerlikon 20 mm cannons, two rocket launchers, four K-guns and Mousetraps and two depth charge racks. By the end of World War II, submarine chasers had sunk around 67 German U-boats. Submarine chasers, destroyers, destroyer escorts and Anti-submarine aircraft has ended the U-boat as a major threat in the Battle of the Atlantic. Theodore R. Treadwell wrote a book called Splinter Fleet: The Wooden Subchasers of World War II in 2000 outlining the work of the 40,000 men that served on Submarine chaser in the open seas. Examples: USS SC-498 and USS SC-497.

== Crash boats ==
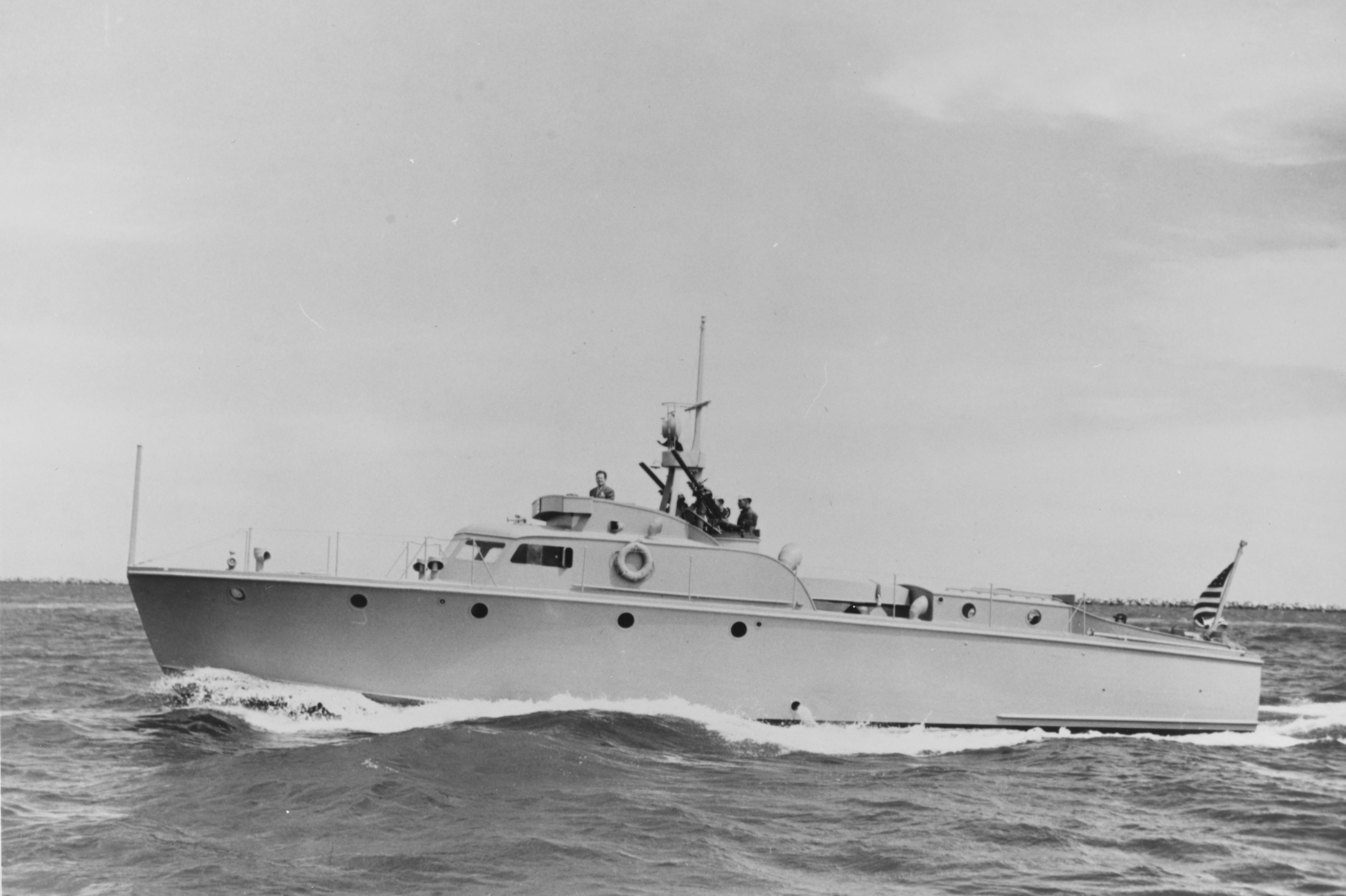
63-foot crash boat

Crash boats of World War II were wooden speed boats built to rescue the crew of downed United States and other Allies airplanes during World War II. By the end of World War II, America had produced 300,000 planes, creating a need to have crash rescue boats, also called Recovery Craft, stationed around the globe. These boats were fast boats used to rescue pilots, crew, and passengers from downed aircraft in search and rescue, air-sea rescue missions. The boats were as small as 22-foot and the largest 104-foot. There were four standard designs used: 104-foot, 85-foot, 63-foot and 42-foot. Most were manned by the United States Army Air Forces. Many had the Hull classification designation Air Rescue Boats or ARB or AVR or P or C or R. The 104-foot had a cold-weather option, that added a heating system, ice protection on the hull, insulation for working around Gulf of Alaska and Aleutian Islands. Most were used in the Pacific War bases across the vast South Pacific, in the Island hopping campaign. Before departing most were part of the US Navy Small Craft Training Centers for training troops and sea trials.

== PT boats ==
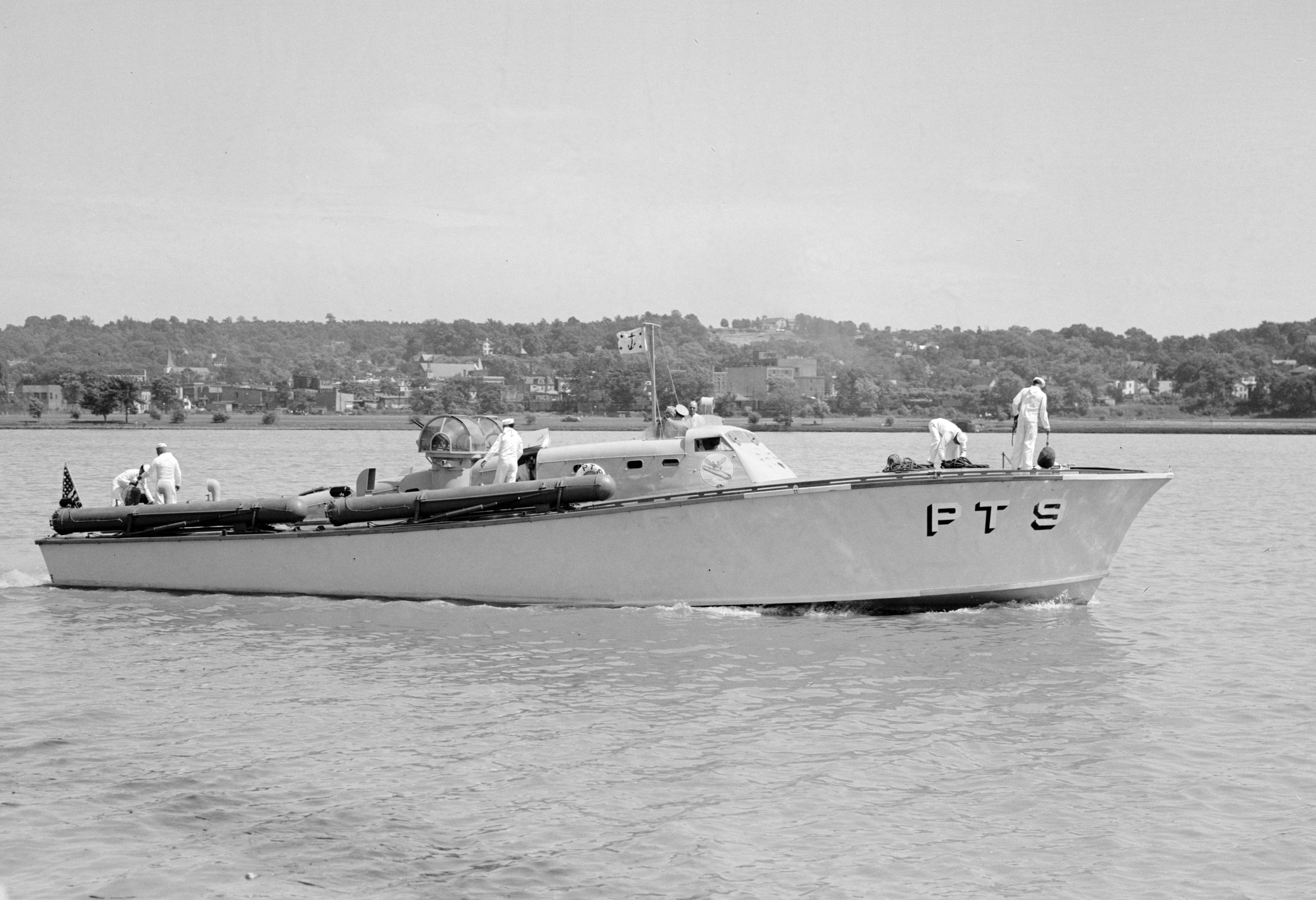
PT-9 torpedo boat

PT (Patrol Torpedo) boats are well known as these small boats were heavily armed, pound for pound the deadliest boats of the war, also called motor torpedo boats. The main anti-ship weapon was four 21-inch Mark 8 torpedoes, each with a 466-pound (211 kg) TNT warhead. These had a range of 16,000 yards (15,000 m) at 36 knots (67 km/h). For anti-aircraft defense they had two twin .50-inch (13 mm) M2 Browning heavy machine guns. Some PTs had a 20 mm (0.79 in) Oerlikon cannon added. The boats were powered with three Packard 4M-2500 and later 5M-2500 supercharged gasoline-fueled, liquid-cooled V-12 marine engines. Boats had a top speed of 41 knots (76 km/h; 47 mph) with 4,500 horsepower. PT boats were built in eleven US boatyards, by the end of the war 808 were built in three lengths: 70, 78 and 80-foot. After the war most were destroyed and some sold. The three high HP engines used a high amount of fuel and the boats were deemed not usable anymore. The PT boat squadrons were nicknamed "the mosquito fleet" and "devil boats" by the Japanese.

== Motor torpedo boat ==
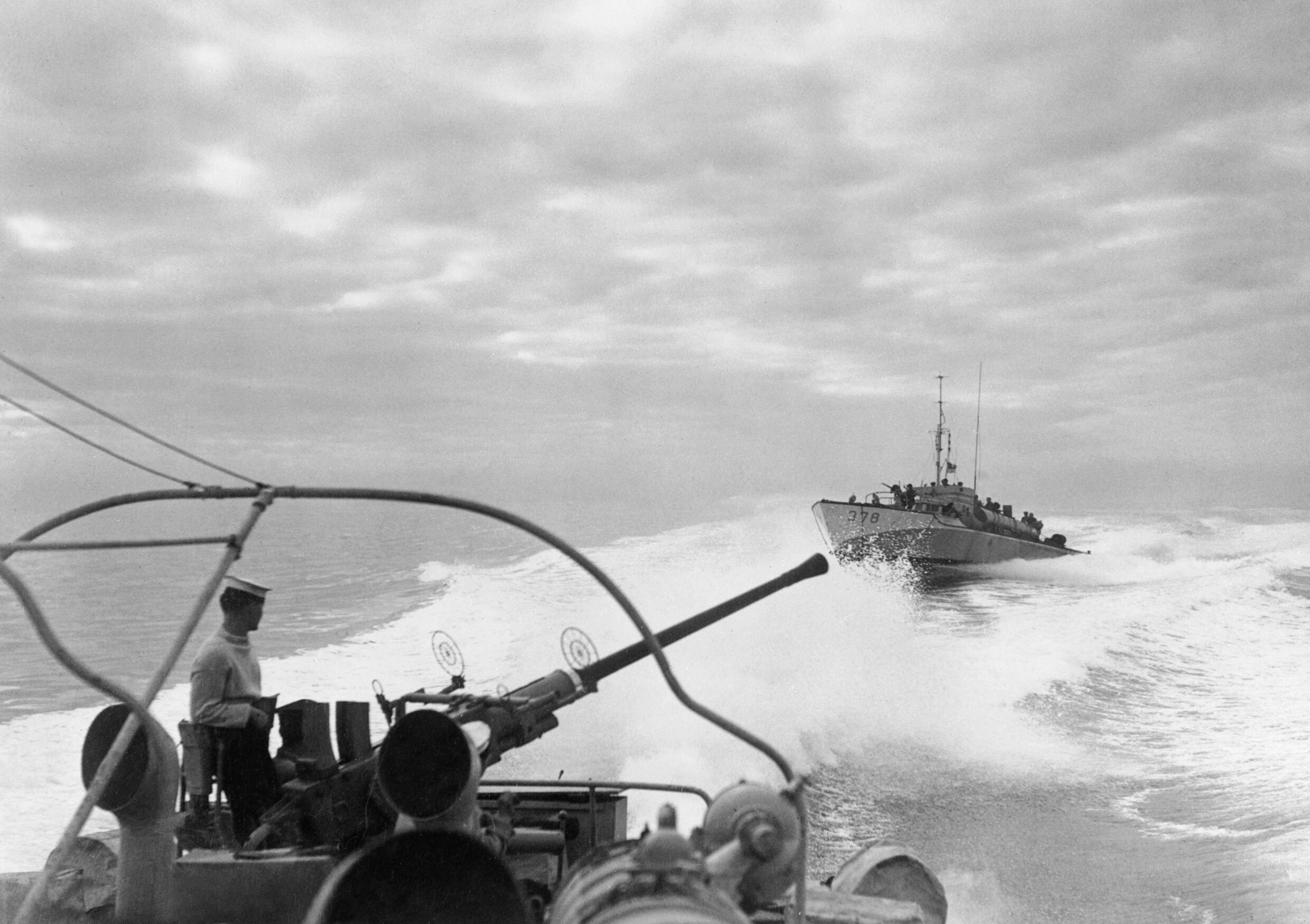
British MTB in the Mediterranean in February 1945

Some US boatyards built motor torpedo boats (MTBs) for the United Kingdom. These were similar to US PT boats, but using British armament, types MTB or BPT. Armed with 18-inch (457 mm) torpedo tubes, Oerlikon 20 mm cannon, and two 0.303 in Vickers K machine guns or two Vickers .50 machine guns). Most also had four depth charges. The US built 136 of the 70-foot Vosper for the Royal Navy. Motor torpedo had a crew of 13. They were powered by three Packard V1-12 marine engines. MTB 259 to MTB 268, MTB 307 to MTB 316 and BPT 8 to 20 were built by ELCO. MTB 419 to MTB 423 were built by Higgins Industries in New Orleans, Louisiana. MTB 396 to MTB 411 were built by Robert Jacob Shipyard in City Island, New York. MTB 275 to MTB 378 were built by Annapolis Yacht Yard in Annapolis, Maryland. MTB 287 to MTB 294 were built by Herreshoff Manufacturing.

== Minesweepers ==
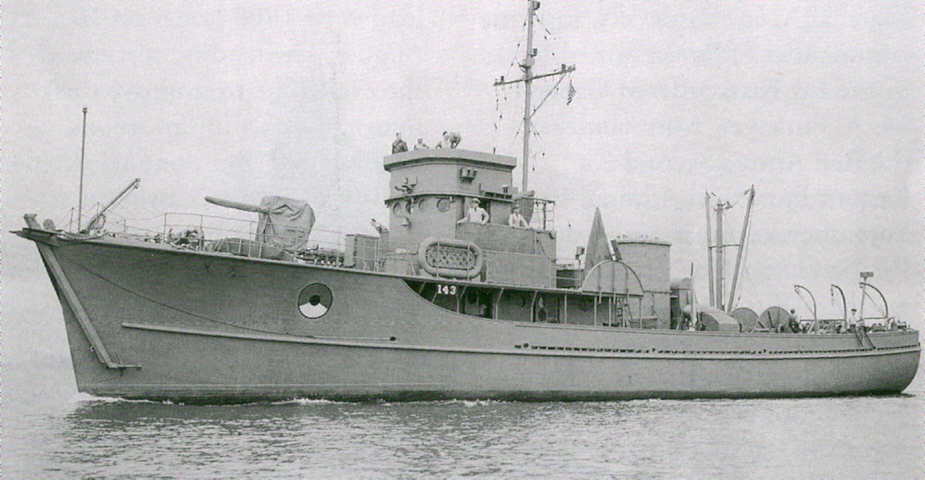
USS YMS-143 Minesweeper

Minesweepers removed or detonate naval mines blocking ports and shipping lanes. Minesweepers were 80 to 136-foot boats. A wood hull boat was preferred for minesweepers, as some mines were magnetically activated. For the war 481 136-foot wood hull Minesweepers were built. The Hull designation was YMS for Yard Minesweeper. They were armed with two 20mm cannons and one 3”/50 caliber gun. There were many different class minesweepers. Examples: USS Accentor (AMc-36), The US Navy operated several classes of Minesweepers: YMS-1-class minesweeper, Hawk-class minesweeper, Kite-class minesweeper.

== Small coastal transport ==
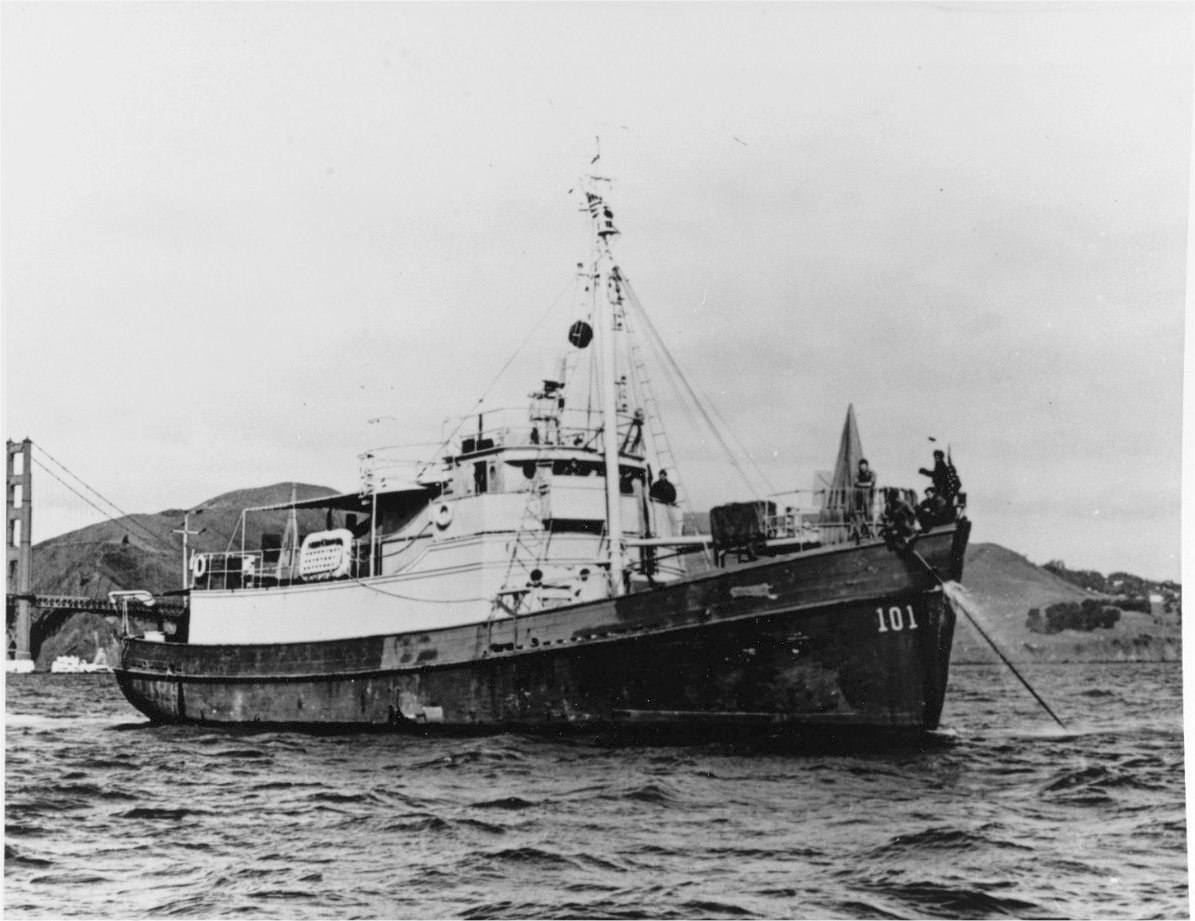
APc-101 Small coastal transport

Small coastal transports or APc-1 class ships were small troopships. These ships were assigned to the Pacific War where they transported supplies, personnel and munitions around the Island hopping campaign. Most were the wooden hull Accentor minesweeper modified to carry 60 troops and their gear to a combat zones. The Small coastal transport, APC, were able to get in shallow ports. Many of the ships were under threat of air, sea and submarine attack. A few ships of the class received battle stars for combat valor, including USS APc-15, USS APc-22, USS APc-25 and USS APc-26. The wooden-hulled ships were built by many different shipyards. Following the war, many of them were converted to fishing vessels. Examples: USS APc-15, built by Camden Ship Building, USS APc-21, built by Hodgdon Brothers, sank December 17, 1943 during landing in the Battle of Arawe, was struck by a bomb during an enemy air attack off Arawe, New Britain, USS APc-25, built by Fulton Shipyard, renamed Cape Scott then Cape Cross. The specifications for modified coastal minesweepers redesign, where given by the District Craft Development Board on April 20, 1942, The redesign gave three planned uses for new APc transport ships:

== Net layers ==
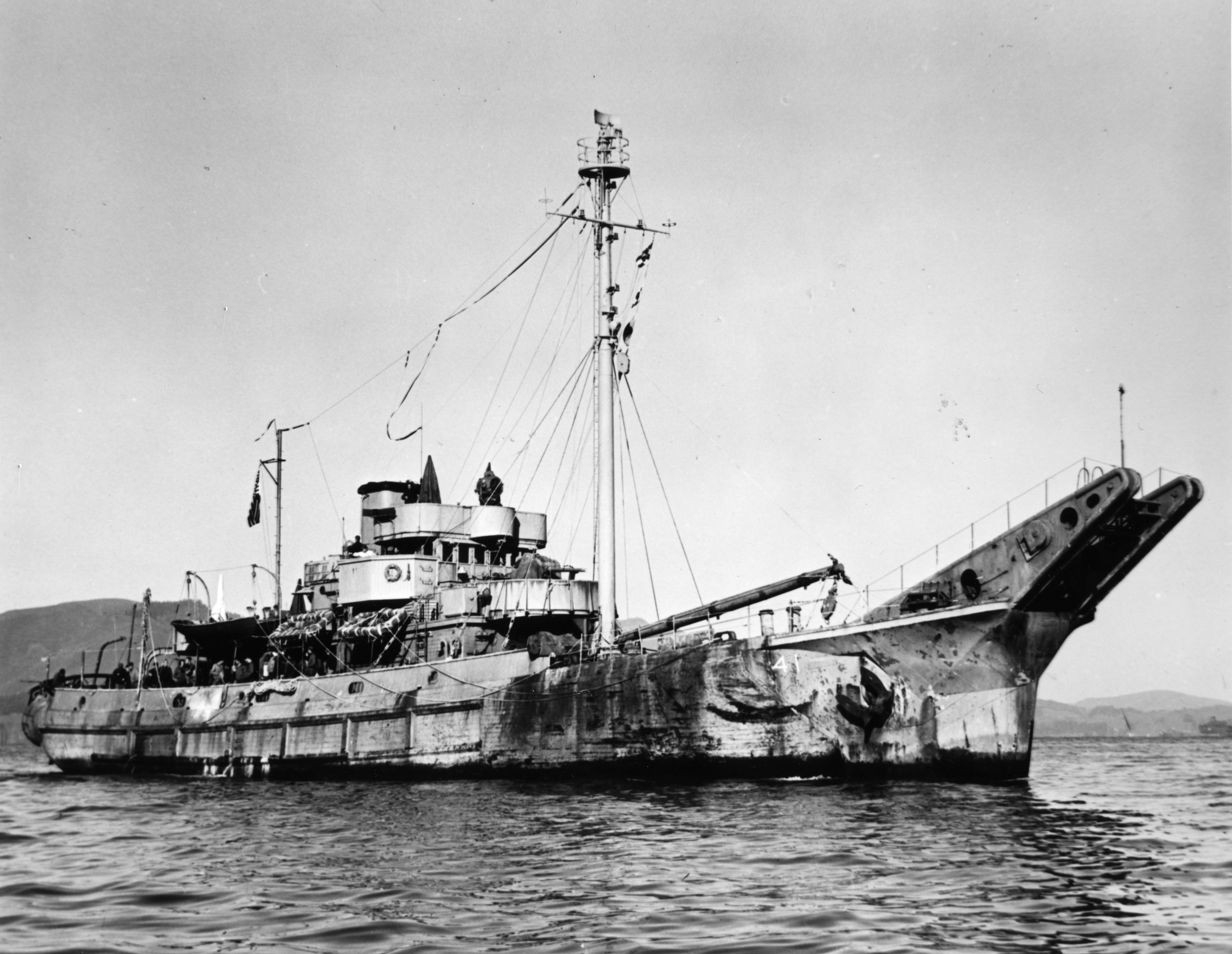
USS Baretta (AN-41) Net layer

Net laying boats of World War II built with wooden hulls were the Ailanthus-class net laying ships. The bow of the ship has a specialized net layer. Other steel-hulled Net laying ships were built. The net layer ship placed steel anti-torpedo or anti-submarine nets to protect ports. If needed steel nets were placed around Capital ships or a group of ships when at risk anchored. Net laying ships were armed with one 3"/50 caliber gun and two to four 20 mm. Built by Everett Pacific Shipbuilding & Drydock Company of Everett, Washington, and for YN 67–76 to the Pollock-Stockton Shipbuilding Company of Stockton, California. The Ailanthus-class net laying ships had a tonnage of 1,100 long tons (1,118 t) GRT, a length of 194–198 ft (59–60 m), a beam of 34.5–37 ft (10.5–11.3 m), a draft of 11.75–13 ft (3.58–3.96 m). Powered by Diesel-electric engines with one shaft, 1,500 hp (1,119 kW). A top speed of 12 knots (14 mph; 22 km/h). Armed with one 3"/50 caliber gun, two and later boats, four single 20 mm AA.

== Tugboats ==
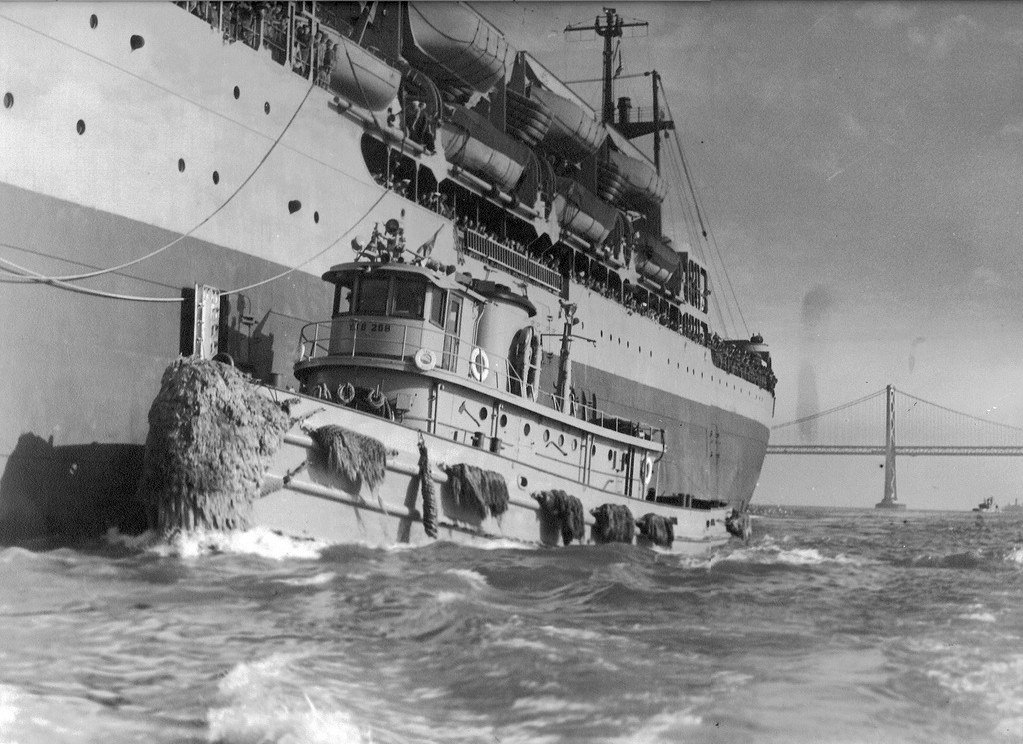
Red Cloud YTB-268 a V2-ME-A1 type Tugboat

With the building of many new ships, Auxiliary floating drydocks and barges for the war, there was a demand for more tugboats. Both new wood and steel hull tugs were built. The largest wooden hull tugboat was the 148-foot (45 m) V3-S-AH2. One of the smaller wooden hull tugboats was the 58-foot (18 m) V2-M-AL1, of which 35 were built. Most V2-M-AL1 tugboats were sent to England for the war efforts under the lend-lease act. Tugs served across the globe during Work War II. SS Farallon and other Type V tugs were used to help built Normandy ports, including Mulberry harbour, on D-Day, June 6, 1944, and made nine round trips to Normandy to deliver Phoenix breakwaters. The type V3-S-AH2 was a wood hull tug at 1,220 tons also sent to Britain. The V2-M-AL1 were wood tug of the Port Sewall class, All were named American ports, most sent to Britain. Auxiliary ATR-1-class rescue tug was a wooden-hulled rescue tug at 1,315 tons fully loaded. For World War II the US Army had tugboats built to move cargo barges in harbors. Small wood US Army MTL Harbor Tugboats, 14 model 324-A with a length of 47 feet, a beam of 12 feet. MTL is for Motor Towing Launch. The Army had built 1,251 marine tractors (MT) and marine tow launches (MTL) by 41 boatbuilders. MT tugs were either 26 feet or 36 feet (Design 329) in length and the MTL were 46 feet. US Army TP Harbor Tug with displacement 185 tons gross, a length of 96 feet, a beam 25 feet, a draft of 11 feet, Power one Fairbanks–Morse six cylinder diesel engine to a single propeller with 450 shp. The TP is for "Tug/Passenger". The US Army had 43 of this 96-foot tugs built for World War II, Ackerman Boat Company` built 15 of them. US Army had built 170 of the 65-foot, diesel-powered, passenger / cargo boats. These could also be used as harbor tugs. These were known as tug-transports, or T-boats.

== Patrol boat ==
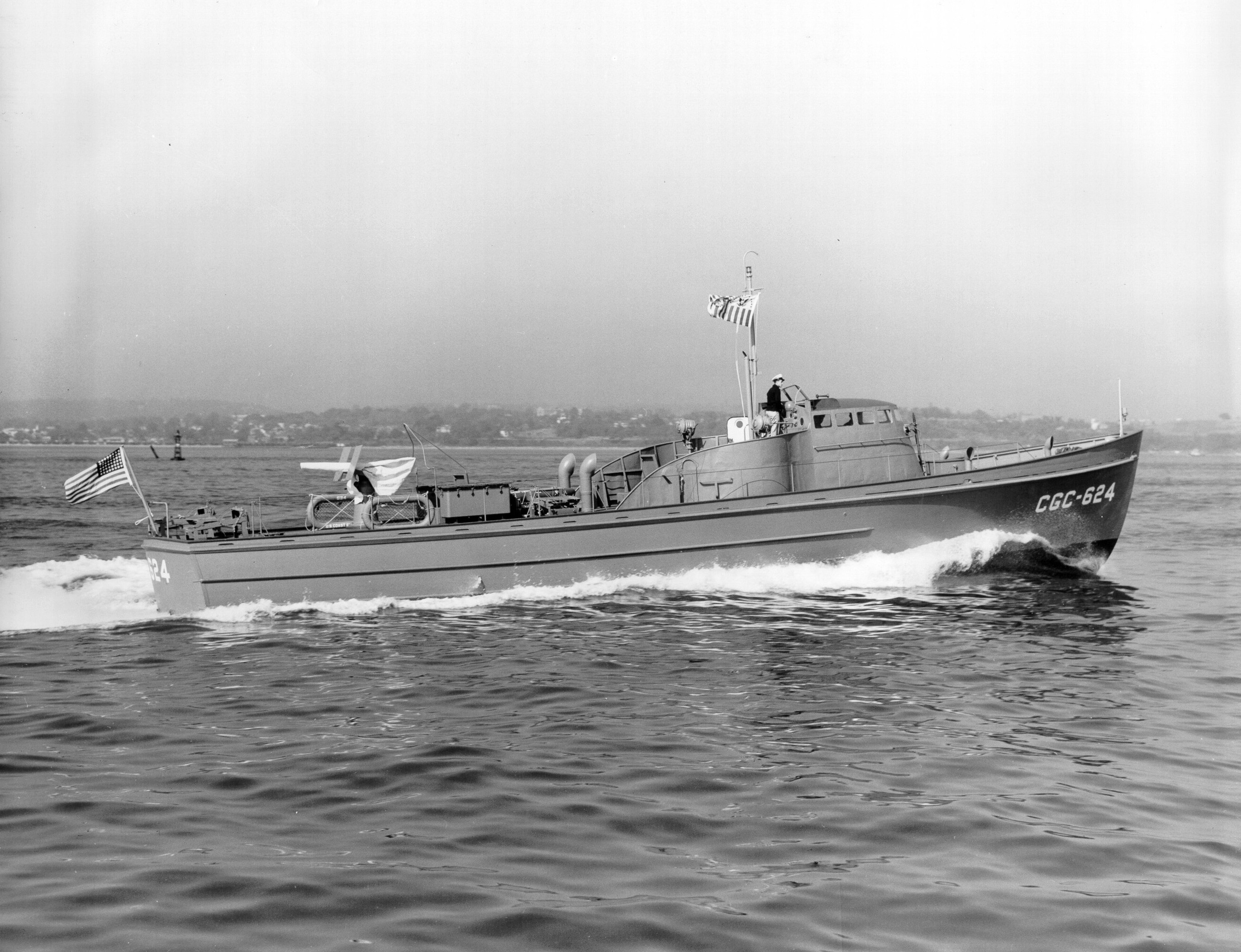
The 83-foot CGC-624 (later USCG-14) in 1942

Wooden-hulled 83-foot patrol boats were used in the United States Coast Guard as patrol boats, also called cutters. Used as patrol craft and rescue craft. The US Coast Guard was active in support of amphibious activity in other the Normandy landings and Pacific War amphibious landing. Landing small woodcraft in the surf was a skill the Coast Guard had and was called on to help with. Coast Guard used not only Patrol boats but many other wood boats and landing craft. The 83-foot patrol had two 600-horsepower "Viking 2nd" Model TCG-8 inline eight-cylinder gasoline engines built by Sterling Engine Company. The boats displacement 76 tons when fully loaded. They were 83 ft (25 m) in length, had a beam of 16 ft (4.9 m), and a height of 64 in (1,600 mm). For dangerous work Chris-Craft built 36-foot wooded Radio Controlled Patrol boats.

== Yard patrol boats ==
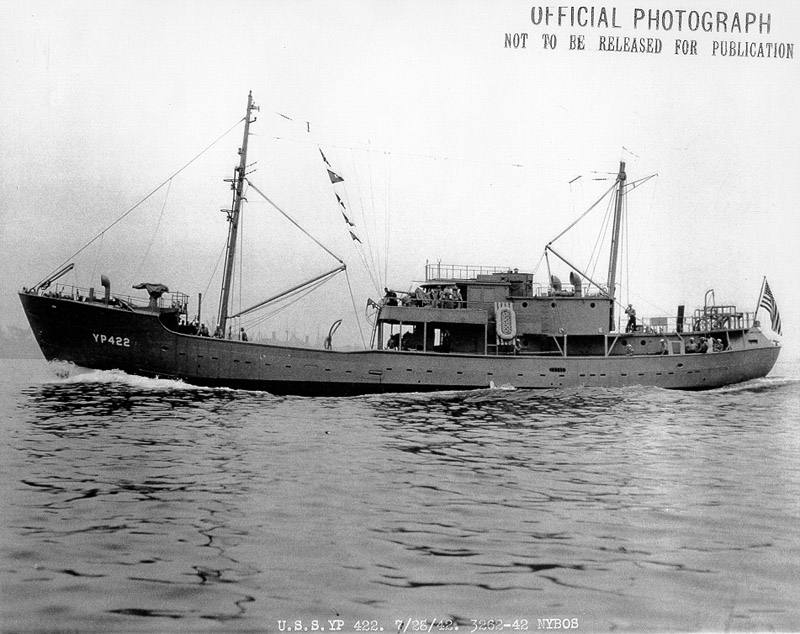
Yard patrol boat USS YP-422

Patrol boats were as small as 22-foot and the largest 110-foot. Some were built new for the war and some were boats acquired for war use. After the attack on Pearl Harbor, the US Navy leased many California tuna boats, most having refrigerated cargo holds were valuable assets for the Navy to deliver fresh goods to troops. Men that had knowledge of these boats were needed. On February 16, 1942, the Navy asked tuna skippers and crews “The Navy needs men to man the [clippers] — experienced men, like yourselves. Needless to say, duty in the war zones will be hazardous.” Over 600 men volunteered to work on the boats and join the Navy. The tuna boats were made Navy boats and patrolled the US coasts, the Panama Canal and served in several battles of the South Pacific, including the Battle of Guadalcanal. Examples: USS YP-72, USS YP-422 and USS YP-74. New boats were also built both with and without refrigerated cargo holds most working in the South Pacific. Over 250 tons of refrigerated cargo could be carried in ten wood and four steel refrigerated wells. Accommodations were provided for three officers and twenty men. These vessels were designed for easy conversion to tuna clippers post war.

== Picket boat ==
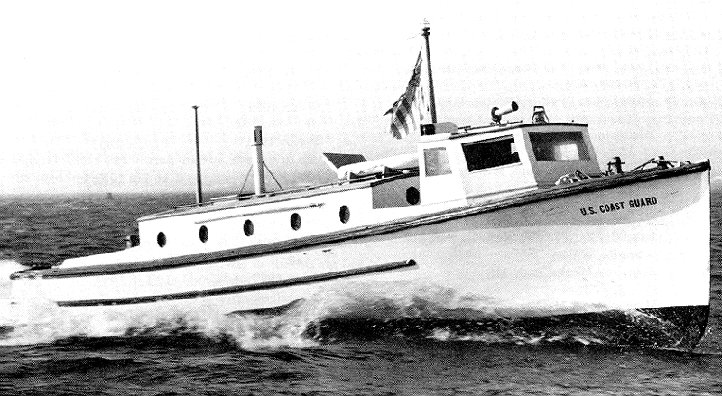
38-foot United States Coast Guard Picket boat

Picket boats were used as harbor patrol boats. Picket boats were usually small boats between 30 and 55 feet. Picket boats also did other close-to-shore work. Most were operated by the United States Coast Guard. Due to their small size, the US Navy often carried them on larger ships to work in remote ports. The name comes from picket troops used in patrols. A series of 600 38 feet (12 m). standard 38-foot (12 m) Cabin Picket Boats were built between 1932 and 1943. These boats had a top speed of 25-knots, a single gasoline engine, and had a crew of 2 or 3 and space for 10. The other standard size was a 36-foot Cabin Picket Boat. The 36 and 38-foot were based on the Sea Bright Skiff fishing boat design. To protect the hull the boats had ice sheathing. For the war, some were armed with small 25-pound depth charges and Marlin machine guns. The Picket boats also did anti-submarine missions, anti-submarine nets checked, frogmen patrols, crash boat work, and sunk ship rescue work. The 38-foots are: Hull numbers CG for USCG, have a displacement of 15,700-pounds (8 tons), a beam: of 10.33 feet, a draft of 3 feet, the fuel of 240 gallons, and range of 175 miles. Power was from either a Hall Scott Model 168 270 hp V6s, 300 hp Sterling Dolphins, Murray, and Tregurtha 325s, or a 225 hp Kermath engine. The 36-foots boats: Have two cabinets, displacement of 10,000 lb (4.5 t)ons), a beam of 8.9 feet, a draft of 30 inches, a Crew of 3, fuel of 240 gallons, power from one engine with 180 HP from Consolidated Speedway MR-6 six-cylinder gasoline engine. Top speed of 20-25 knots with a range of 175 miles.

== Fireboat ==
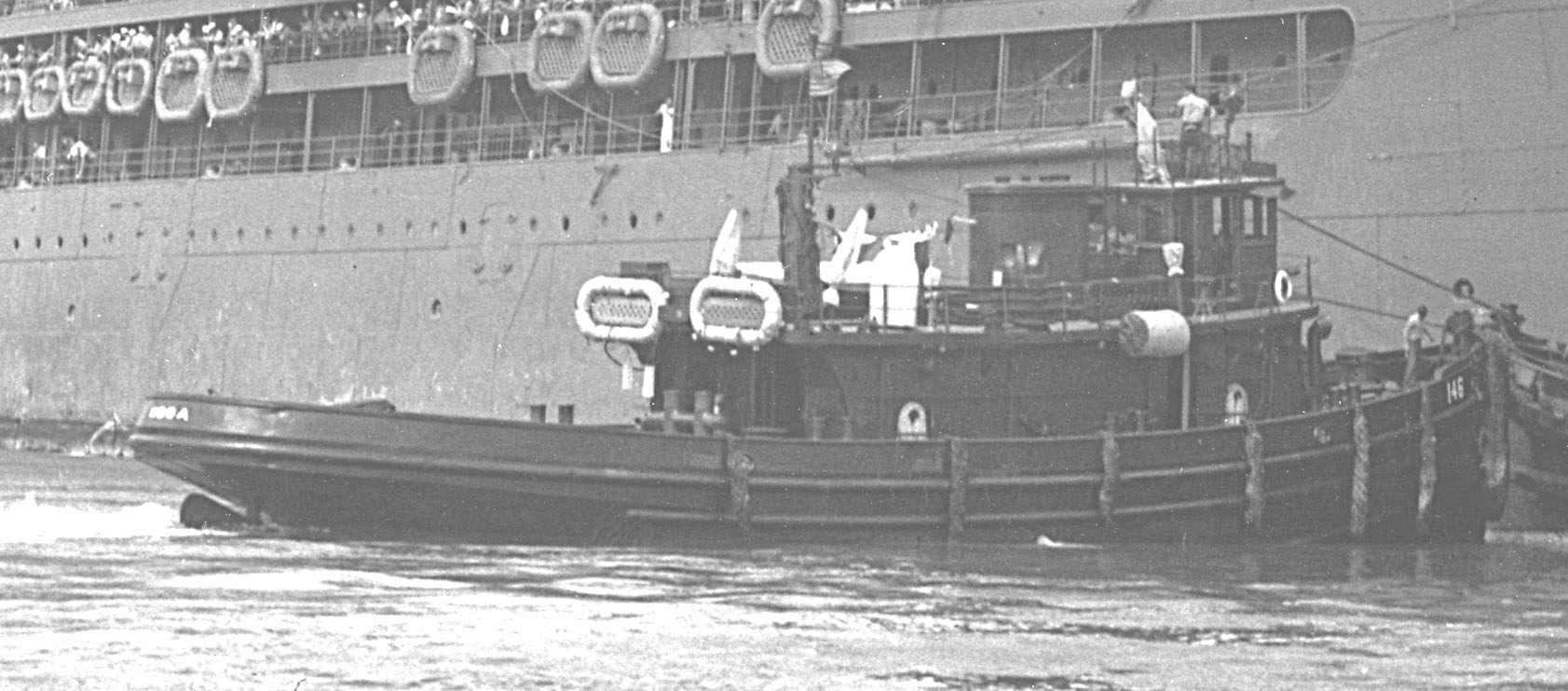
Hoga (YT-146) fire-fighting tug

During the war, there were tugboats with fire-fighting gear, dedicated fireboats and some minesweepers that had firefight capability added to the boat. Some US Coast Guard cutters and Patrol Boats also have firefight capability added. Example: The Atlantic III was a wood hull fireboat built in 1943 in Brownsville, Texas, after the war served in Wilmington, North Carolina. Higgins Industries built fireboats called J Boats for the US Army. Example:Hoga (YT-146) fire-fighting tug at Pearl Harbor in 1941. USS Marabout (AMc-50) was a firefighting minesweeper.

== Wood barges ==
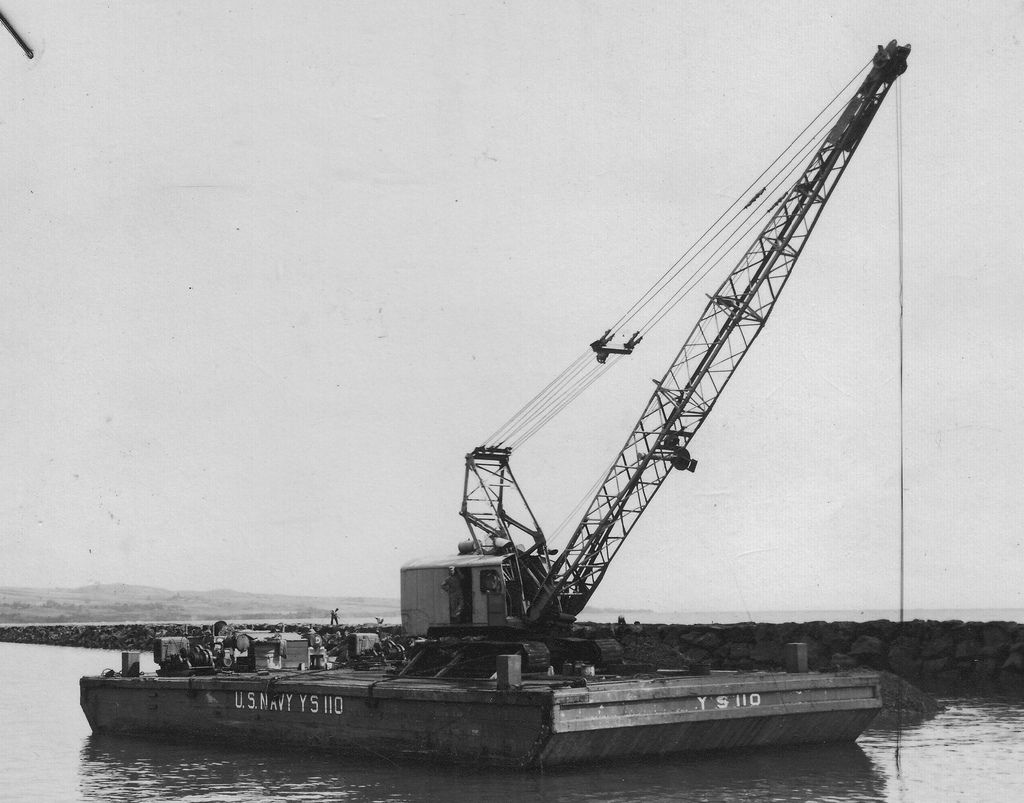
YS-110 with a crawler crane US Navy wooden barge

A number of different types of wood barges were used in the war. A flat bottom Wood Barges could be used in shallow ports or be tow onto beaches. They were low cost to build and could be abandoned after used if needed. With the shortage of steel, a fleet of wood barges was built. Due to the shortage of steel, a fleet of Concrete Barges were also built. To stop hull wood rot, some have copper-sheathed hulls. Martha's Vineyard Ship Building Company in Vineyard Haven, MA built 110-foot wood barges for the US Navy at 250 tons in 1942 (YC-843 to YC-847). YS-110 was an 80-foot wood barge with a 40-foot beam. She had a flat deck and was built in the Pearl Harbor Navy Yard in 1943. YS-88 was a 100-foot wood barge with a 42-foot beam. Built in the Pearl Harbor Navy Yard in 1941.

== Motor launch ==
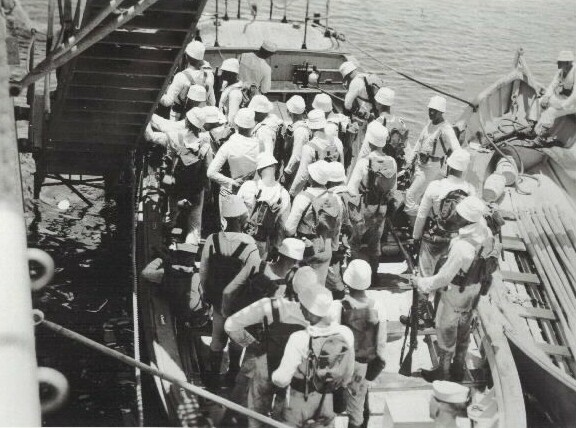
US Navy Motor Launch, loaded on the USS Houston (CA-30), used to get to shore

A motor launch has an open deck and often is used to ferry passengers from large ships to shore or other boats. Some launches were also mounted with one or more machine guns and used as patrol boats. Motor launches (ML) were 20 to 115-foot long. They were also used in rescue missions if needed. Motor Launch Ambulance Boats were give the hull letter J. Example: USS Pilgrim II (YFB-30). Madden and Lewis Company built Harbour Defence Motor Launches, Q 1183 to Q 1186 in 1943. Harbour Defence Motor Launches have a length of 76 feet, a beam of 16 feet a draft: 5 feet and a displacement of 54-tons. HDML had two engines. They had a crew of 10 men, armed with one 3 or 4-pounder gun and four .303 AA guns. They had a top speed of 11 knots.

== Command boats ==
The US Army needed boats to supervise beach landing and other near-shore activities. Wooden boats of different lengths were acquired and give the destination Q boats for HQ, headquarter. John & Associates built 72 Q – HQ boats in 1943. AC Command boats 22- to 63-foot and used as launches and passenger boats also. Hull QS boats were also used as communication boats. The US Army also has CS ships for communications relays. Example: USS Volador (IX-59).

== Landing craft ==
For the Normandy landings and the Pacific island-hopping war, many different beach landing craft were needed. Some like the large, Landing Ship, Tank were made with a steel hull. But most of the small and medium landing crafts were made of wood. Key design of the landing craft is a flat bottom, shallow draft, and protection for the propeller so it does not hit the sea floor.

=== Landing craft LCVP ===
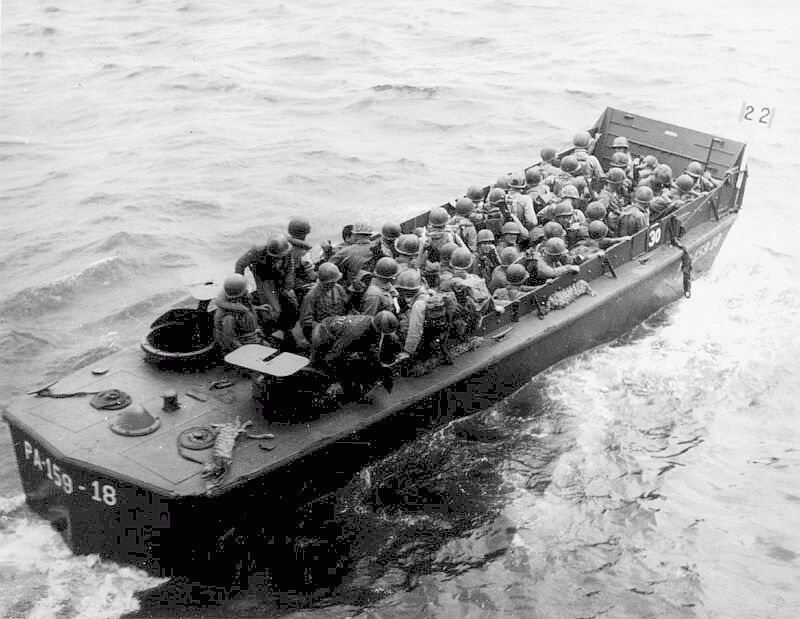
USS Darke (APA-159)'s LCVP 18, at Okinawa in 1945.

The Higgins Boat or also called the LCVP for landing craft, vehicle, personnel could take 36 troops to shore. LCVP were plywood 36 ft (11 m) long and just under 11 ft (3.4 m) wide. The Higgins boat was used to place a jeep with 12 troops or up to 8,000 pounds of cargo on the beach. To unload a front steel ramp would drop on the beach. After unloading the craft would reverse and back off the beach. The LCVP was lightly armed with two .30 cal. Browning machine guns. Thousands of LCVP were built for the war. The LCVP had a top speed of 12 knots. A LCVP is on display in The National WWII Museum.

=== Landing Craft, Personnel (Ramped) ===
Before the LCVP, Andrew Higgins first ramped landing craft was the Landing Craft, Personnel (Ramped) or LCP(R). The Landing Craft, Personnel (Ramped) could take 30 to 36 troops or 6,700 to Or 8,100 lb. of cargo to a beach. Landing Craft, Personnel (Ramped) are 35 feet 10 inches long and a beam of 10 feet 9 inches, and a draft of 2 feet 6 inches aft. The top speed is 11 knots with a range of 80 to 200 miles. They were armed with two .30 cal. 303 Lewis gun and has a crew of 3. The LCP(R) was used in beach landing on North Africa, Guadalcanal, Salerno, and Tarawa. By D-day the very similar LCVP had replaced the Landing Craft, Personnel (Ramped).

=== Landing Craft, Personnel (Large) LCP(L) ===
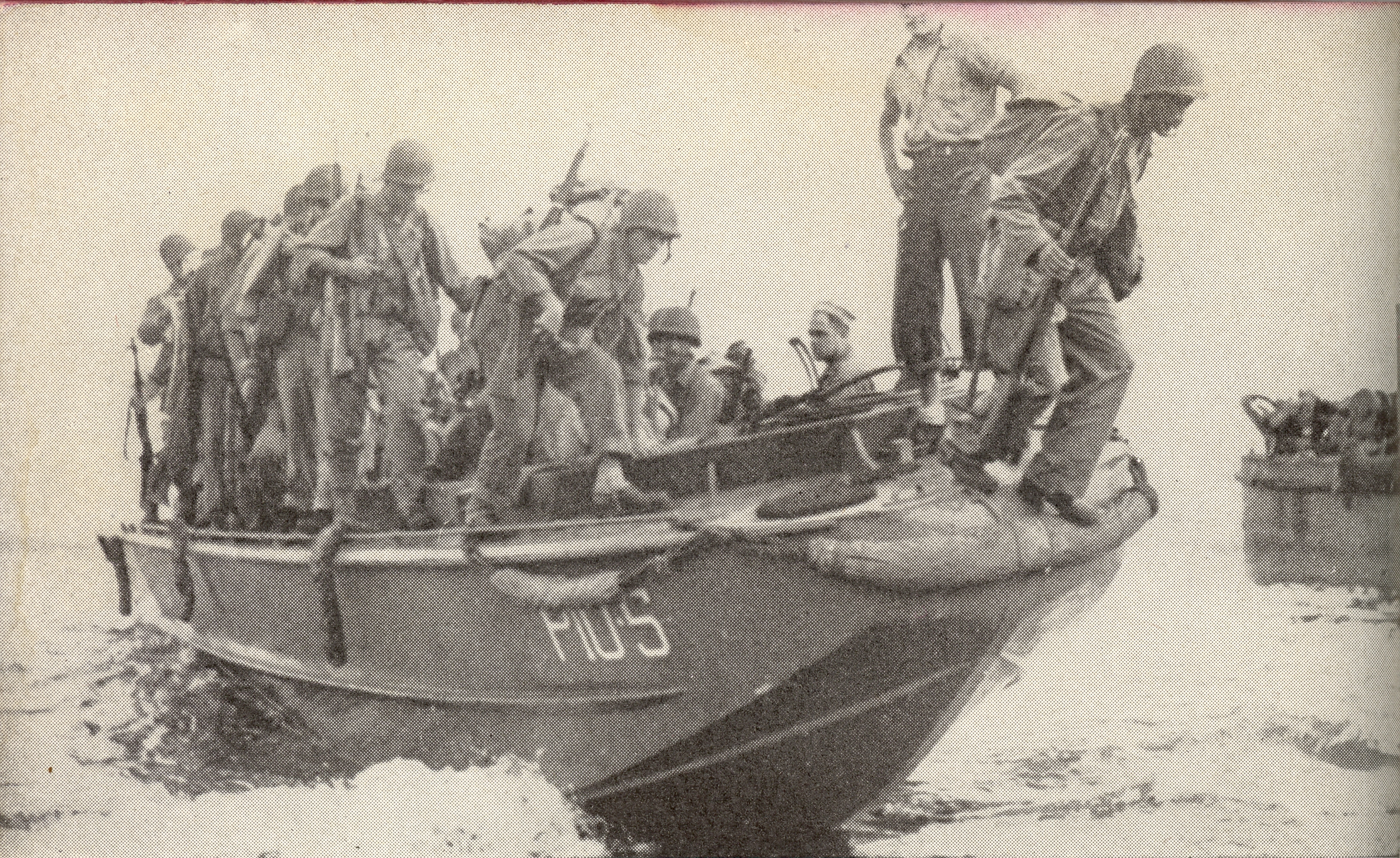
LCP(L) lands reinforcements on Guadalcanal

Landing Craft, Personnel (Large) or LCP (L) were used to bring troops from ship to beaches, like the LCVP, but without a ramp. LCP(L) were carried to the combat zone by large ships and lowered into the water. They were built from pine planks and plywood with some light armor plates. They were first built in New Orleans, Louisiana, as more were needed other boatyards built them. They had a crew of 3 and could transport 36 troops at top speed of 8 knots (13 km/h). They had a displacement of 13,500 pounds light and 21,600 pounds loaded. They are 36 feet 8 inches in length, a beam of 10 feet 10 inches, and a draft of 2 feet 6 inches aft. light or 3 feet 6 inches aft. loaded. They can with either a gasoline engine with a 50 miles range or a diesel with 130 miles range. Armed with two Browning .30 cal. machine guns, or US manufactured Lewis .30 cal. machine guns.

=== Landing Craft, Personnel (Medium) LCP(M) ===
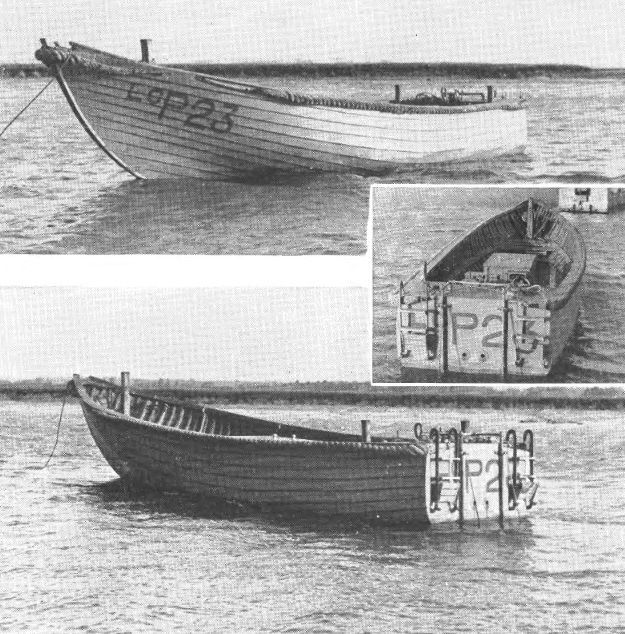
Landing Craft, Personnel (Medium) LCP(M)

Landing Craft, Personnel (Medium) or LCP(M) was constructed of wood. The craft had a shallow draft and a solid bow so it can be grounded safely on beaches. It also operated well in rocky coastlines. For loading and unloading the craft at the bow and stern four portable ladders were used. The craft could carry 20 troops with a range of 112 miles at the top speed of 7 knots loaded. The craft had a length of 39 feet, a beam of 10 feet, and displaced 4 tons lite and 7 tons loaded. The craft had a draft of 1-foot 6 inches forward and foot 7 inches aft. The craft was Armed with one .303 cal. Lewis gun. The craft was crewed by one officer per 3 craft and 3 men. Powered was from one Scripps Ford V- 8, 65-hp. engine to a single screw. The 100 gallons of gasoline fuel was stored in two fire-resistant covered tanks, called "Linatex. Two were lost in 1943: No.14 in November 1943 and No.17 was lost off Isle of Wight on January 5, 1943

=== Landing Craft, Vehicle ===
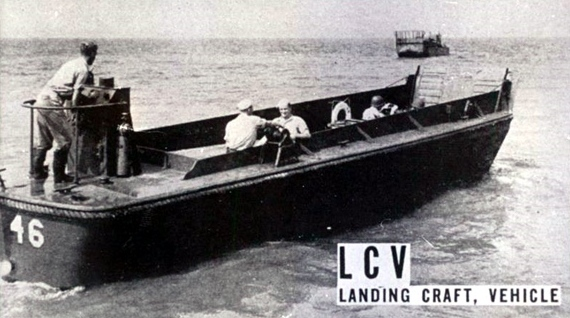
Landing Craft, Vehicle built by Chris-Craft

Landing Craft, Vehicle (LCV) are small craft used for beach landings of troops and cargo. Close to the LCM design. The craft was carried to the beach on the deck of large ships like the APA, AKA, LST LSD or LCT, The craft can move one 1-ton truck, or 36 troops, or 10,000 lb. of cargo. Range of 68 miles at 9 knots top speed or 120 miles at 7 knots. The craft is 36 feet long, a beam of 10 feet and 10 inches, Displaced 7 tons lite and 11 tons loaded with a draft: 1' 6 forward and 2'6 aft. British craft armed with one .303 Lewis gun. Crew of 3 men and 1 officer per 3 craft. power from diesel or gasoline engine with 225 to 250 hp. Could move small vehicles like the jeep or a 37mm anti-tank gun.

=== Landing Craft Assault ===
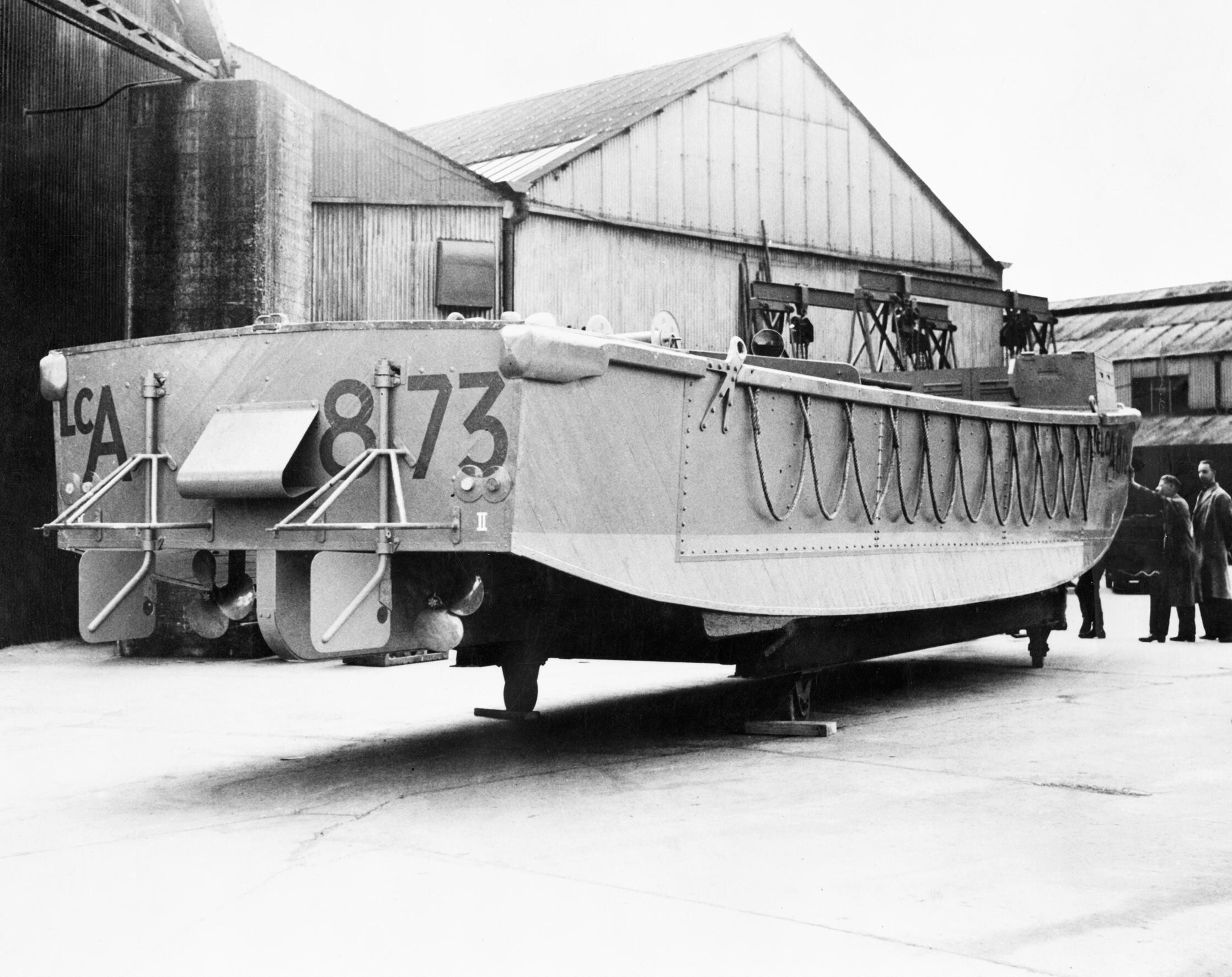
A new Landing Craft Assault

Landing Craft Assault was used mostly by the Royal Navy. The United States Army Rangers used and like the craft also as it had low silhouette, a shallow draft, little bow wave, quiet engines, a sturdy hull, and a good load capacity with on ramp. Landing Craft Assault had a displacement of 9 tons (9,144 kg), a length of 41.5 feet (12.6 m), a beam of 10 feet (3.0 m), a draft of 1-foot-1-inch (0.33 m) forward, 1-foot-9-inch (0.53 m) aft light and a draft loaded of 1-foot-9-inch (0.53 m) fwd, 2 feet 3 inches (0.69 m) aft. Powered by two 65 hp gas Ford V-8 with a top speed of 10 knots (19 km/h; 12 mph) light and 6 knots (11 km/h; 6.9 mph) loaded. The craft had a range of 50 to 80 miles. A LCA could carry 36 troops or 800 pounds (360 kg) of cargo. Crew of four: coxswain, two seamen (sternsheetsman and bowman-gunner) and mechanic-stoker) with one officer per group of three boats. Armed with one Bren light machine gun, two Lewis guns, and later two 2-inch mortars. DIHT, a heat-treated steel plate, was added over the hardwood planking to give some armor. and Normandy. Later in the war, the US built a similar craft the "Woofus" based on the LCM.

=== Landing Craft Support ===
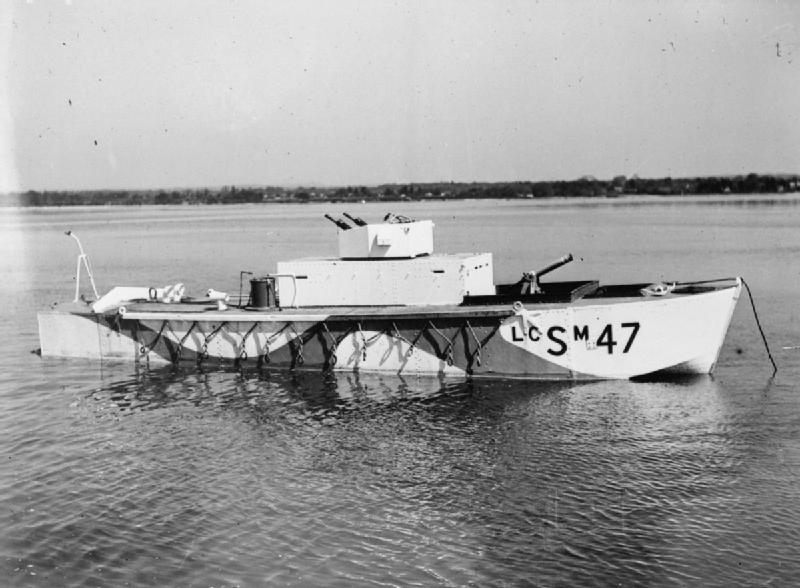
Landing Craft Support Small

Landing Craft Support crafts came in three types of wooden hulls: small, medium and large.

- Small: LCS(S)

The Landing Craft Support small was close in design to the LCC. Landing Craft Support Small crafts were carried to the beach site by APA's or AKA's ships. Landing Craft Support Small crafts had a range of 115 miles at full speed. The top speed was 12 knots. Landing Craft Support Small is 36 feet long, had a beam of 11 feet, and had a draft of 3 feet and 6 inches, they displaced 20,000 lb lite. They were armed with two .50-cal or three .30-cal or one .50-cal and two .30-cal M.G. They fired with two barrage rocket projectors carried. For defense, some units had eight Matk III smoke pots. They had a crew of 6 and carried 180 gallons of fuel.

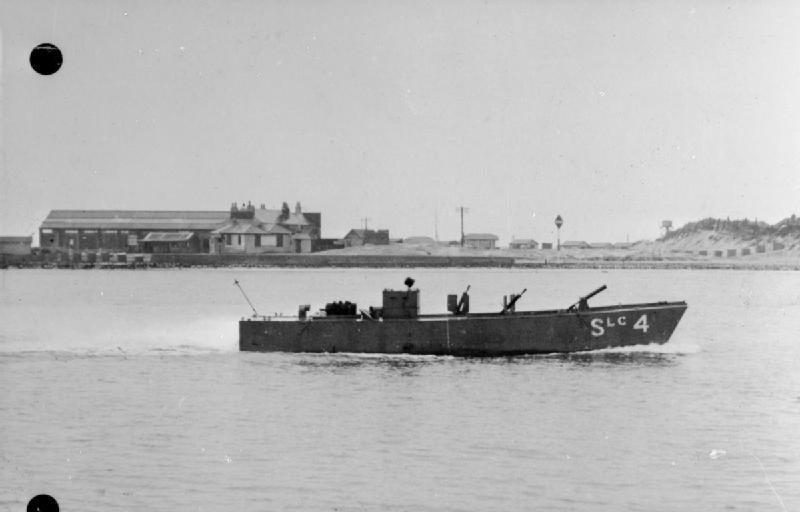
Landing Craft Support Medium

- Medium: LCS(M)

Was used to provide landing support by firing rockets before the beach assault. Landing Craft Support Medium, LCS (M)(3). There was a later improved design with a pointed bow for better speed. Range 90 miles at top speed of 9 knots. A length of 41 feet, a beam, of 10 feet. Displaced 11.4 tons lite and 12.8 tons loaded. A draft of 1-foot 6 inches forward and 2 feet 11 inches aft. Armed with two 50 twin power-operated Vickers M.G., two .303 Lewis guns, one 4-inch smoke mortar. Had twelve Type 18 smoke generators. To protect wood hull had DIHT steel plating on hull sides and deck, bulkheads, and on conning tower and ammunition hoist. Had a crew of 1 officer, 3 men, 6 gun crew. Powered by two Ford V -8 Scripps gasoline engines with 65 hp each. Held 98 gals. of gasoline.

=== Landing Craft Infantry (Small) ===
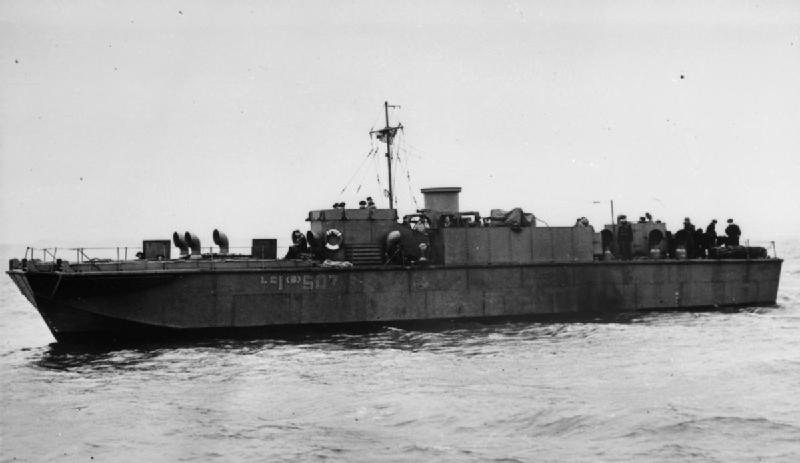
Landing Craft Infantry (Small), LCI(S) 507

Landing Craft Infantry (Small) LCI(S) is a British infantry carrier design. The wooden hull design is like the LCS(L). Troops unloaded on four bow ramps. The LCI(S) transported six officers and 96 troops below deck. The LCI(S) has a range of 550 miles at 15 knots, top speed, and 700 miles at 12 knots. LCI(S) has a length of 105 feet, are 63 tons light, and 100 tons loaded. The beam is 21 feet, and draft 2 feet 10 inches forward and 3 feet 8 inches aft. with loaded. The craft is armed with: Two 20 mm guns. (some added two or more 20 mm guns); two .303 Lewis guns. For armor DIHT plating was added to the deck, sides, gun positions, generator house, and forward bulkhead. The ship had a crew of: Two officers and 15 men with housing. Powered by two Hall-Scott gasoline engines with 1,120 hp. Some were had 1,500 hp. with supercharger. The engines powered twin screws with silencers. Craft stored up to 4,000 gallons of gasoline.

== Other ==
There were many types of small wooden boats used during World War II, due to the size, these were normally made of wood, but some would not be included in the title of the Splinter fleet.

- Utility boat is as small as a 9-foot dinghy, but also could be as large as a 135-foot boat.
- Ship's lifeboats are often made of wood and are carried on larger ships in case they sink.
- Rescue Lifeboat
- Rowboat
- Skiff
- Whaleboat

== Gallery ==
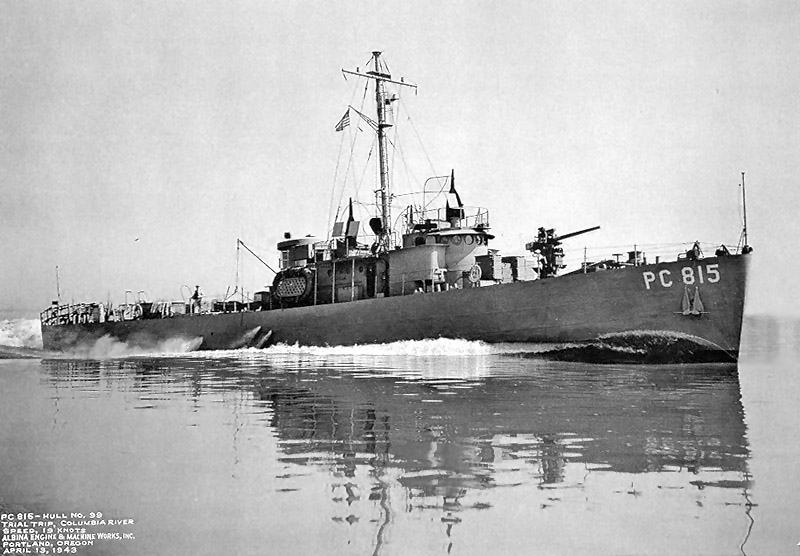
USS PC-815 Subchaser

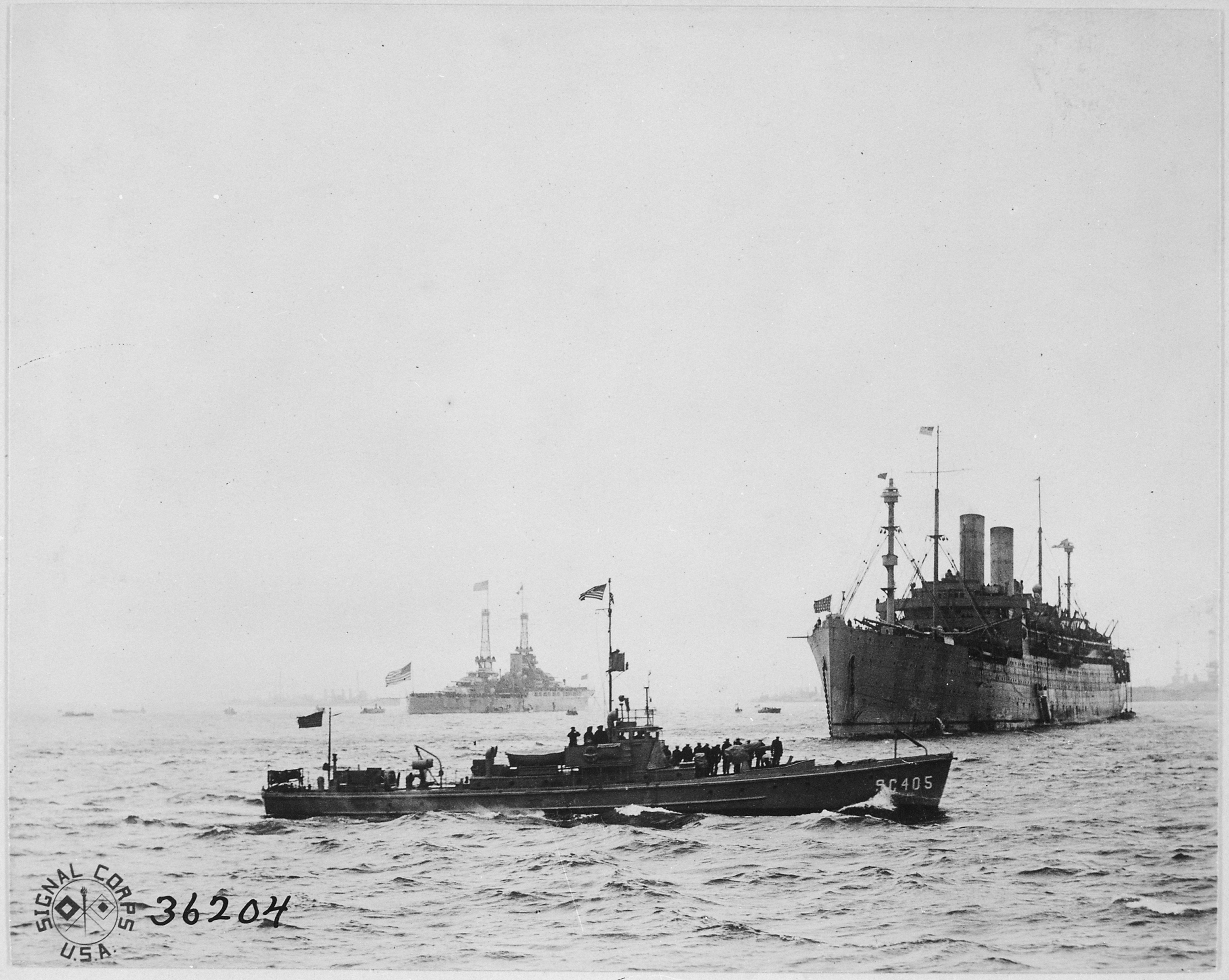
SC-405 Submarine chaser at Brest, France

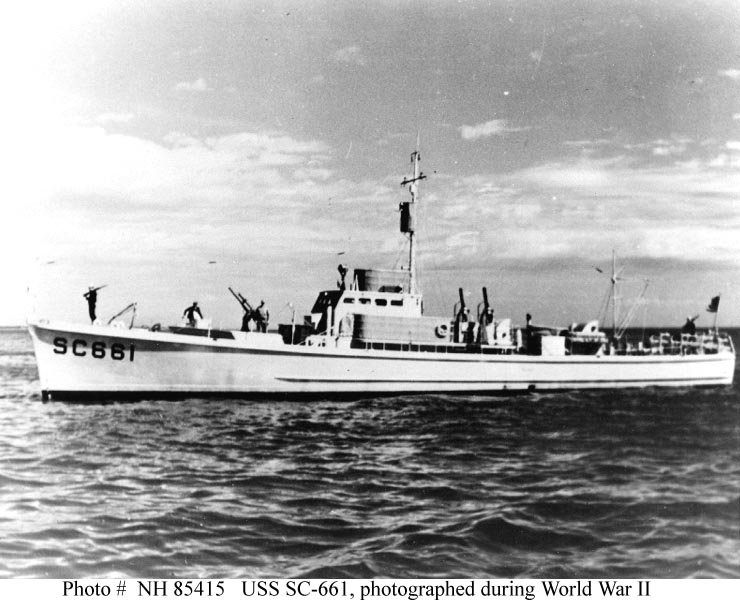
USS SC-661, Submarine chaser

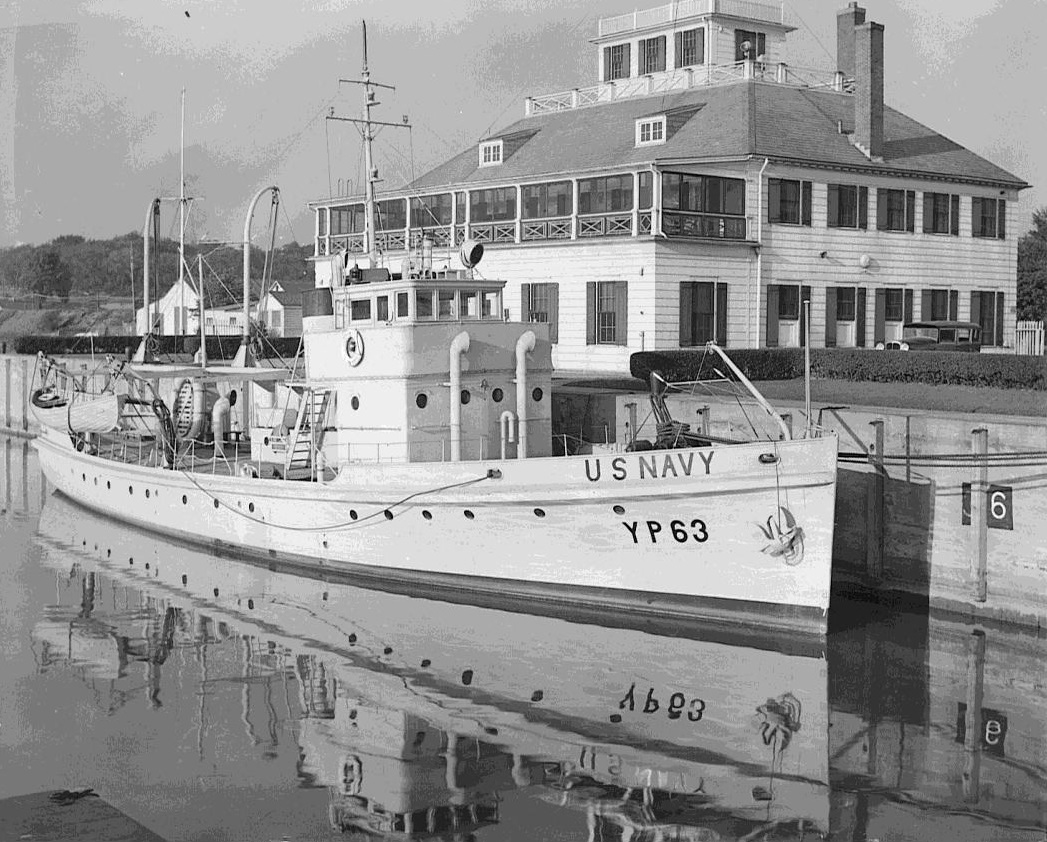
USS YP-63, Yard Patrol boat

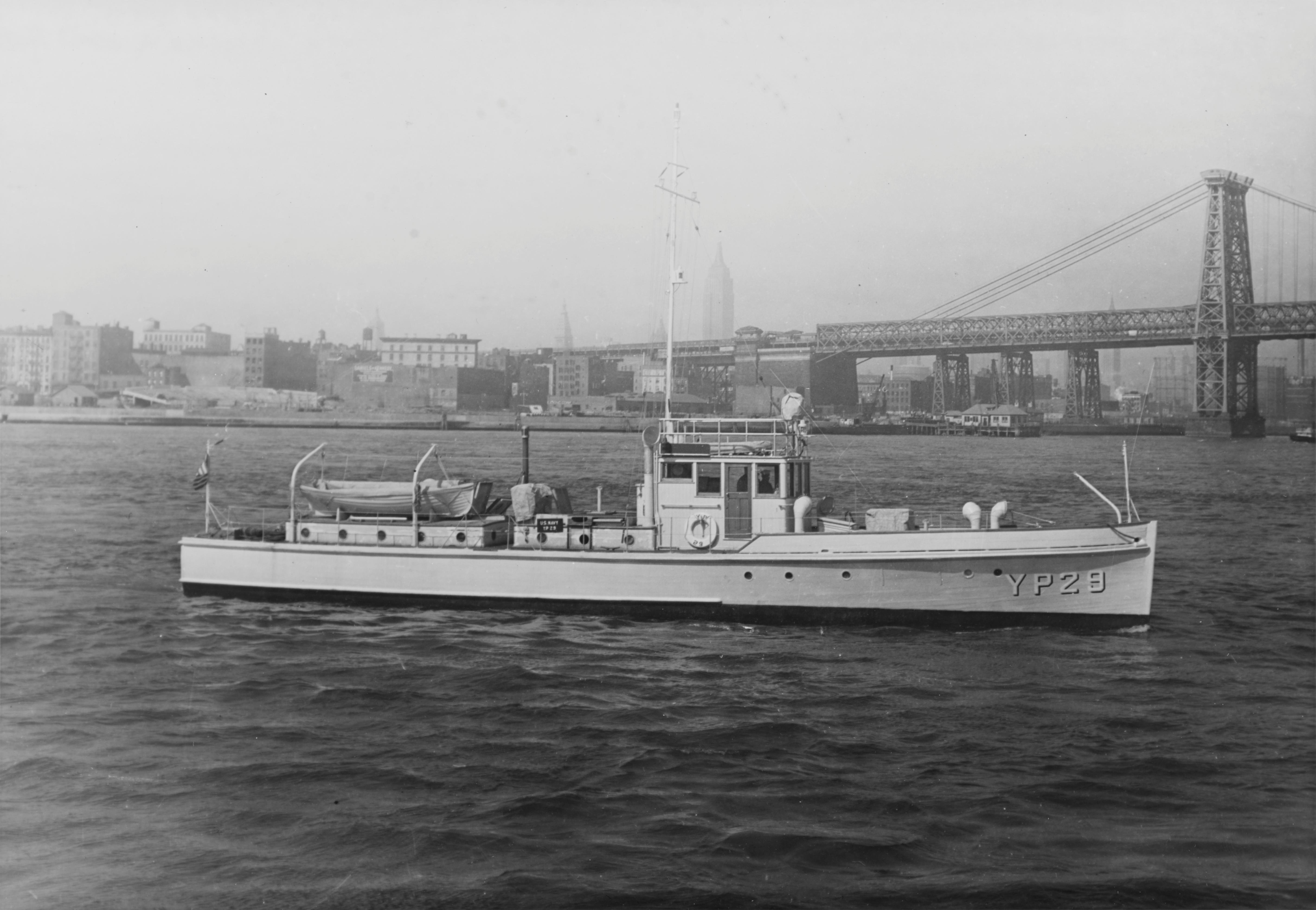
USS YP-29, Yard Patrol boat in 1941

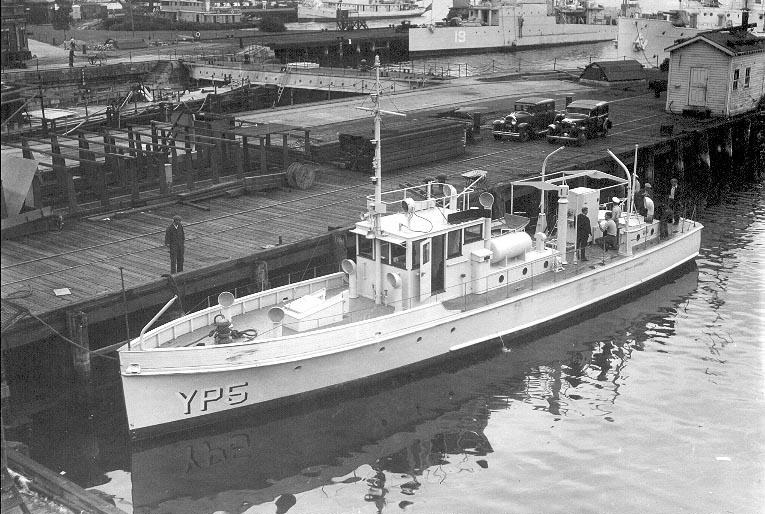
YP-5 USN Yard Patrol Boat

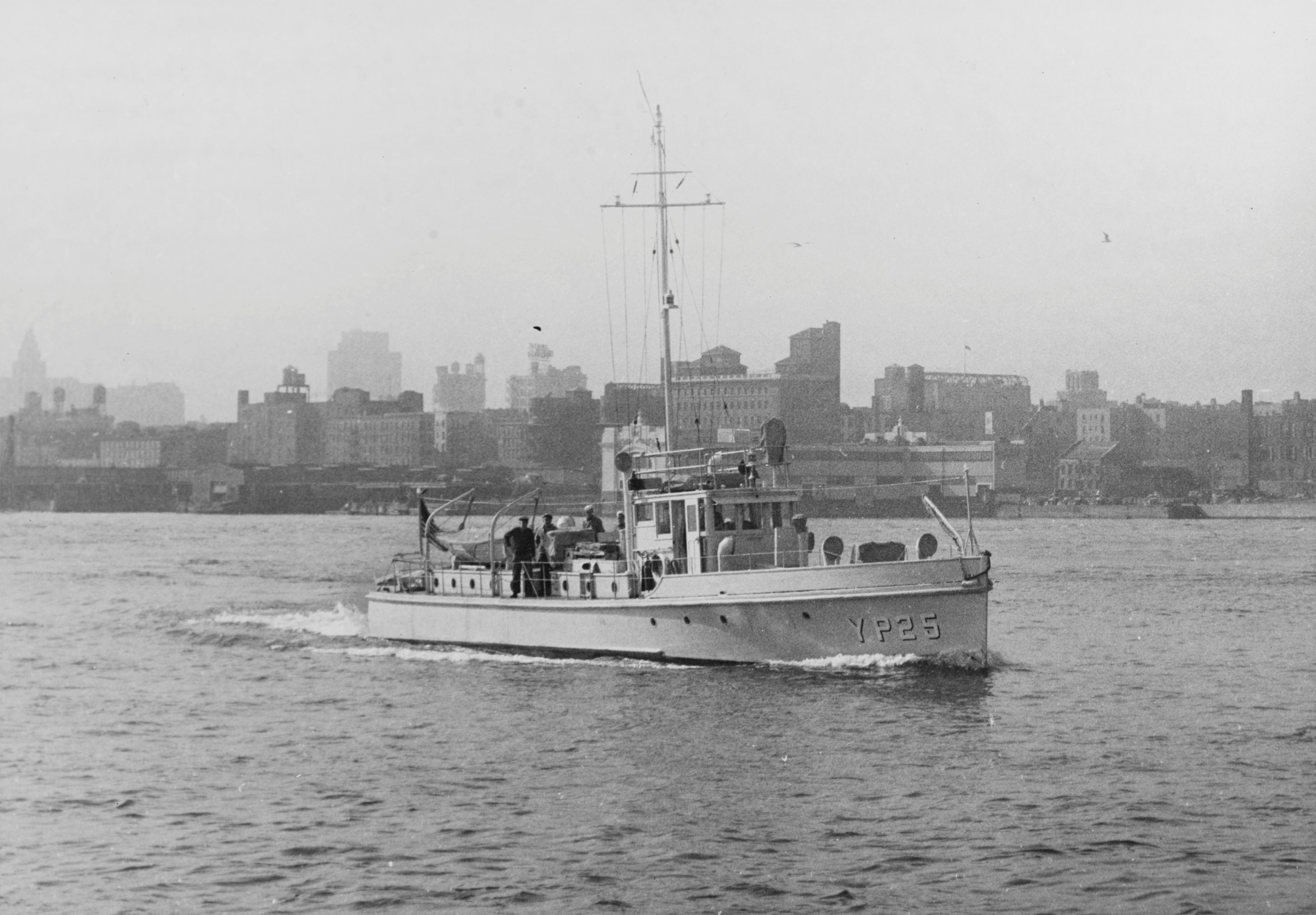
USS YP-25, Yard Patrol boat in 1941

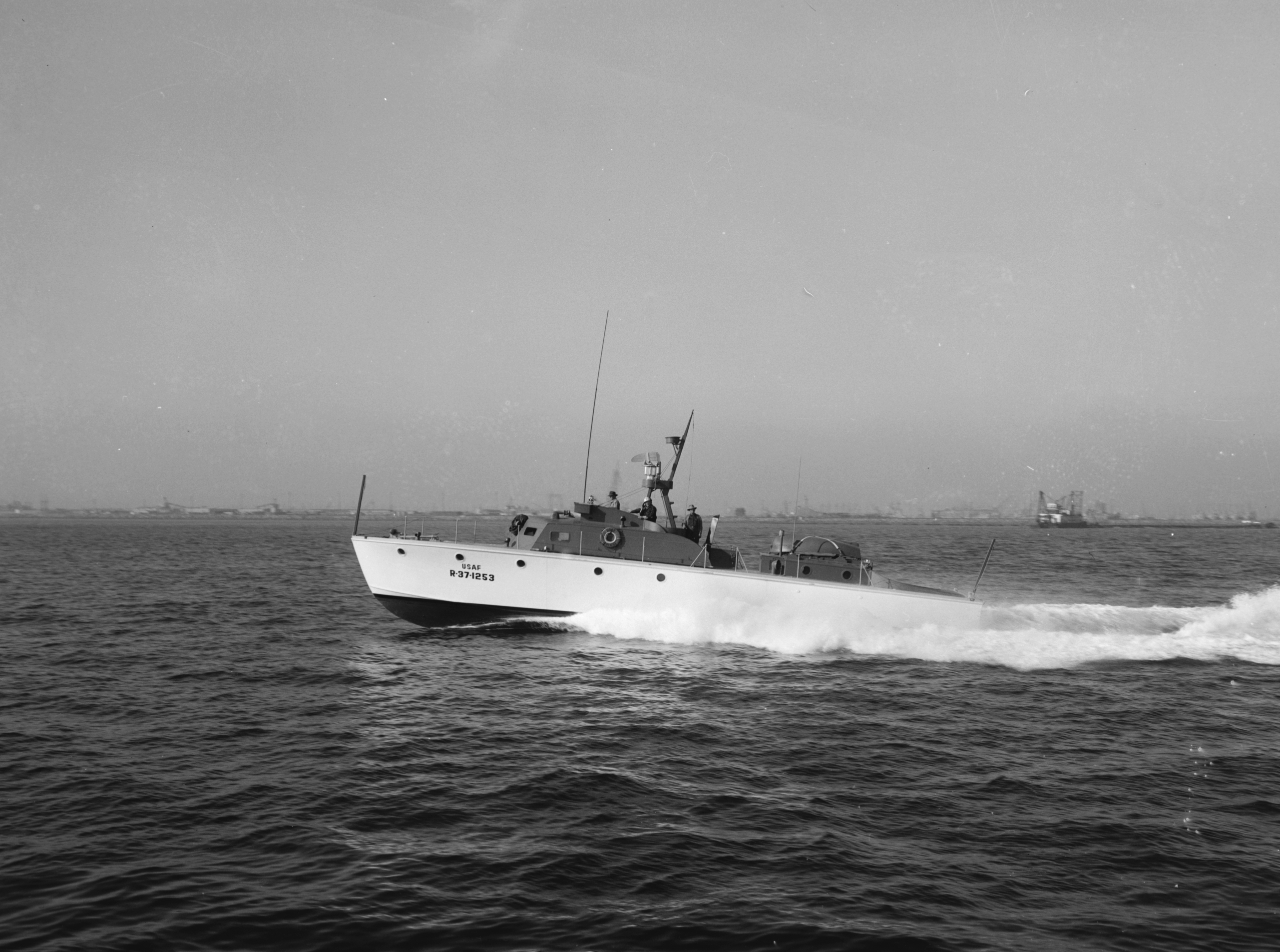
63 ft (19 m) air-sea rescue boat

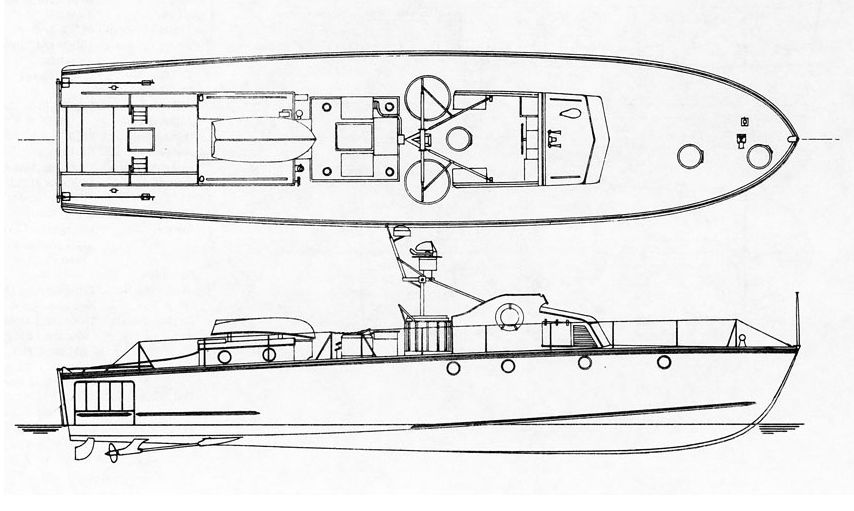
63 ft (19 m) air-sea rescue boat

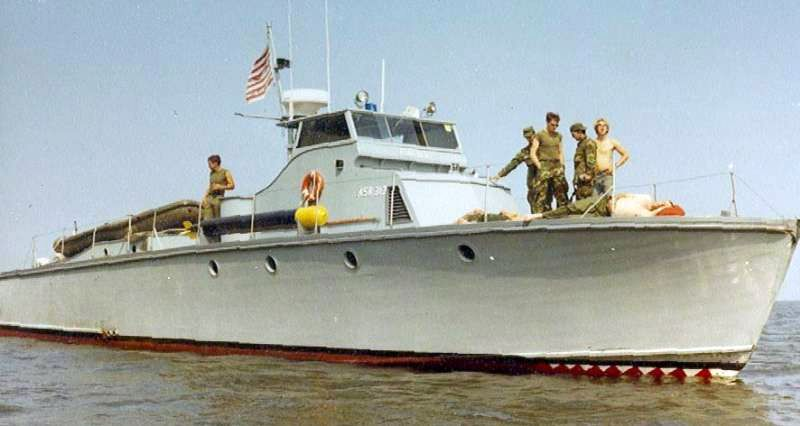
63-foot ASR 313 built in 1943 with Reserve Officers' Training Corps in 1984

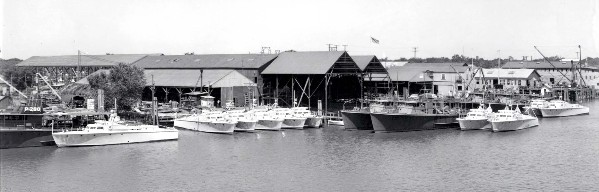
Stephens Bros. Boat Builders in Stockton, California, with 63-foot in 1944

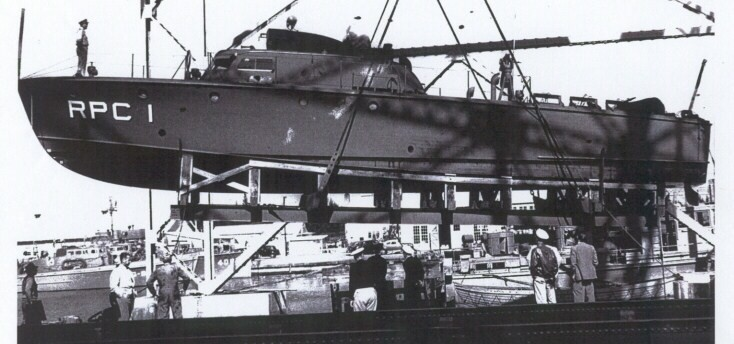
Model 293 transferring to the USSR as a patrol vessel in 1942

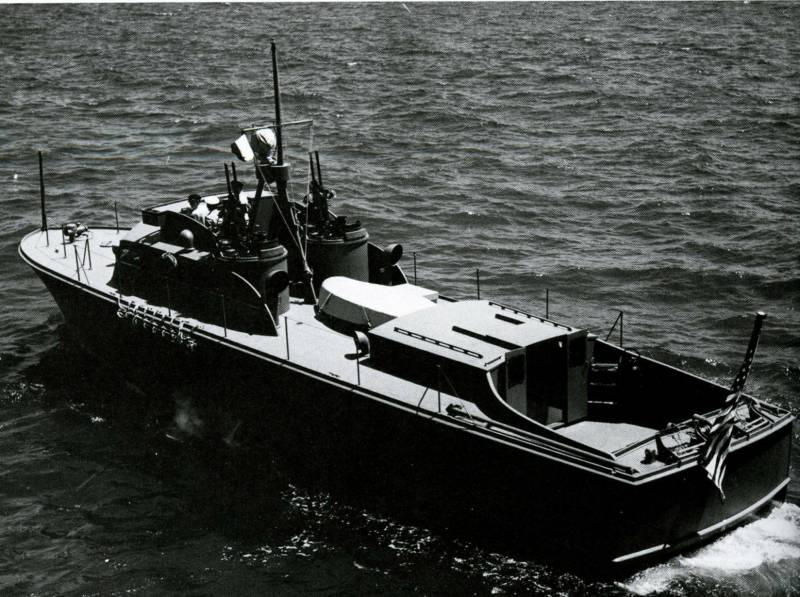
63-Foot Crash boat AVR at sea 1945

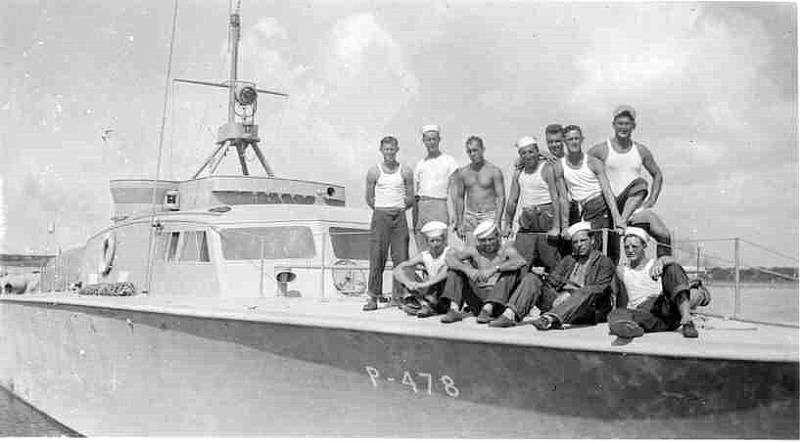
Crash boat Type ASR85, P-478 in 1943

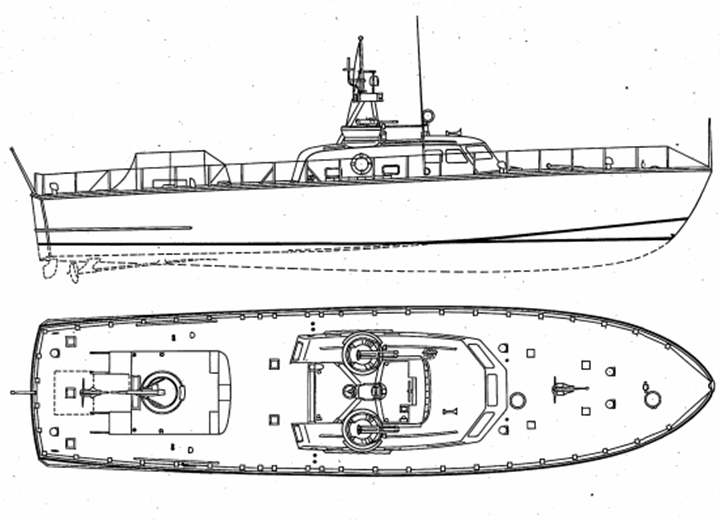
85-foot crash boat

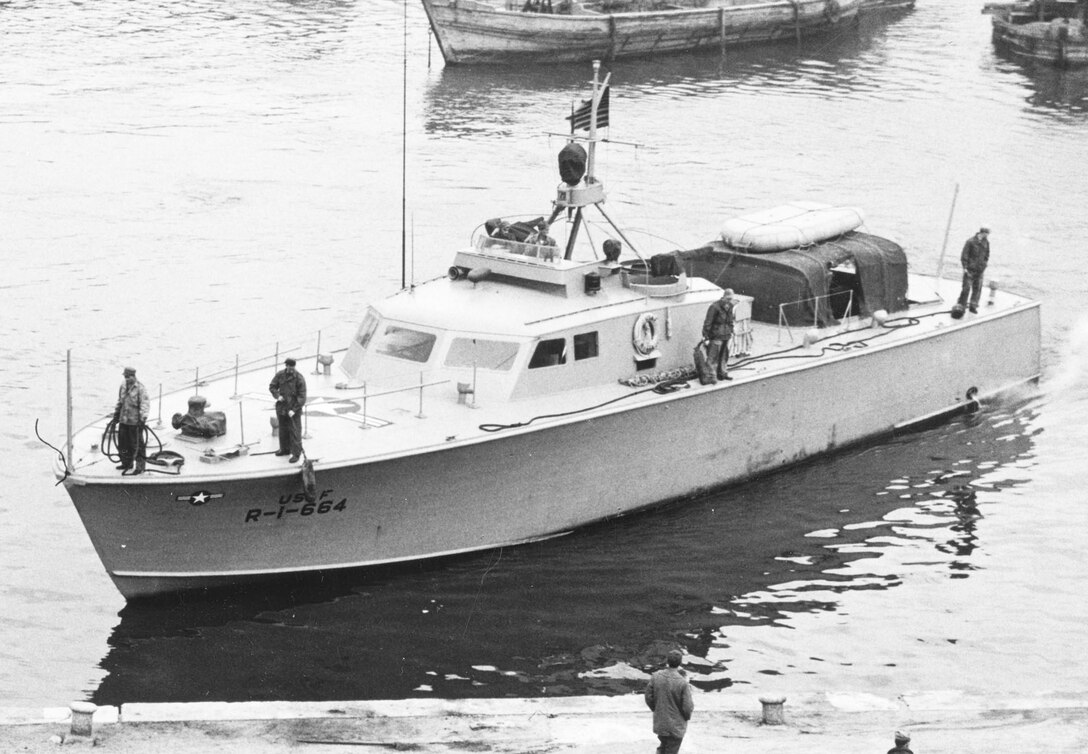
US Air Force 85-foot crash rescue boat in Korea

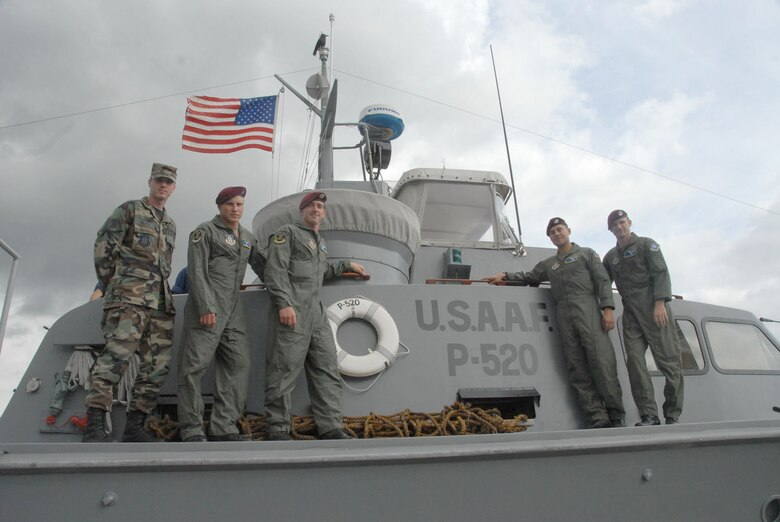
Air Force Reserve Airmen from the 304th Rescue Squadron, on P-520 a Crash Boat on the Willamette River in Portland, Oregon

P-281 104-foot crash boat

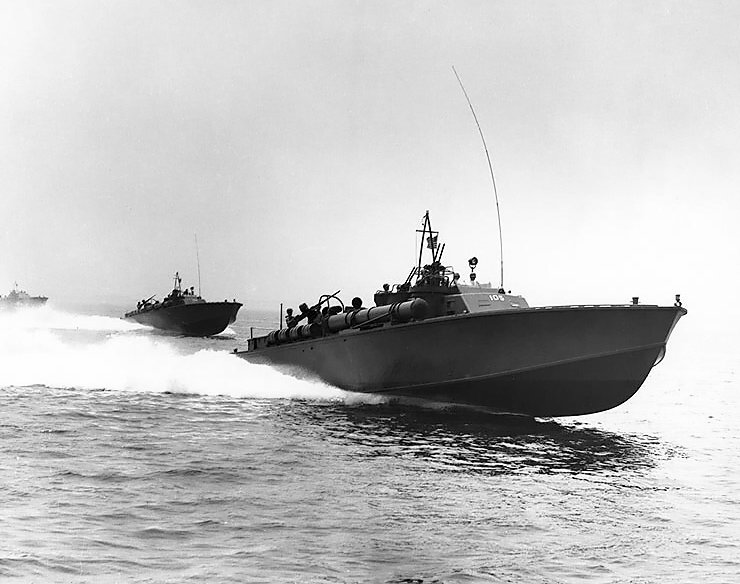
USS PT-105

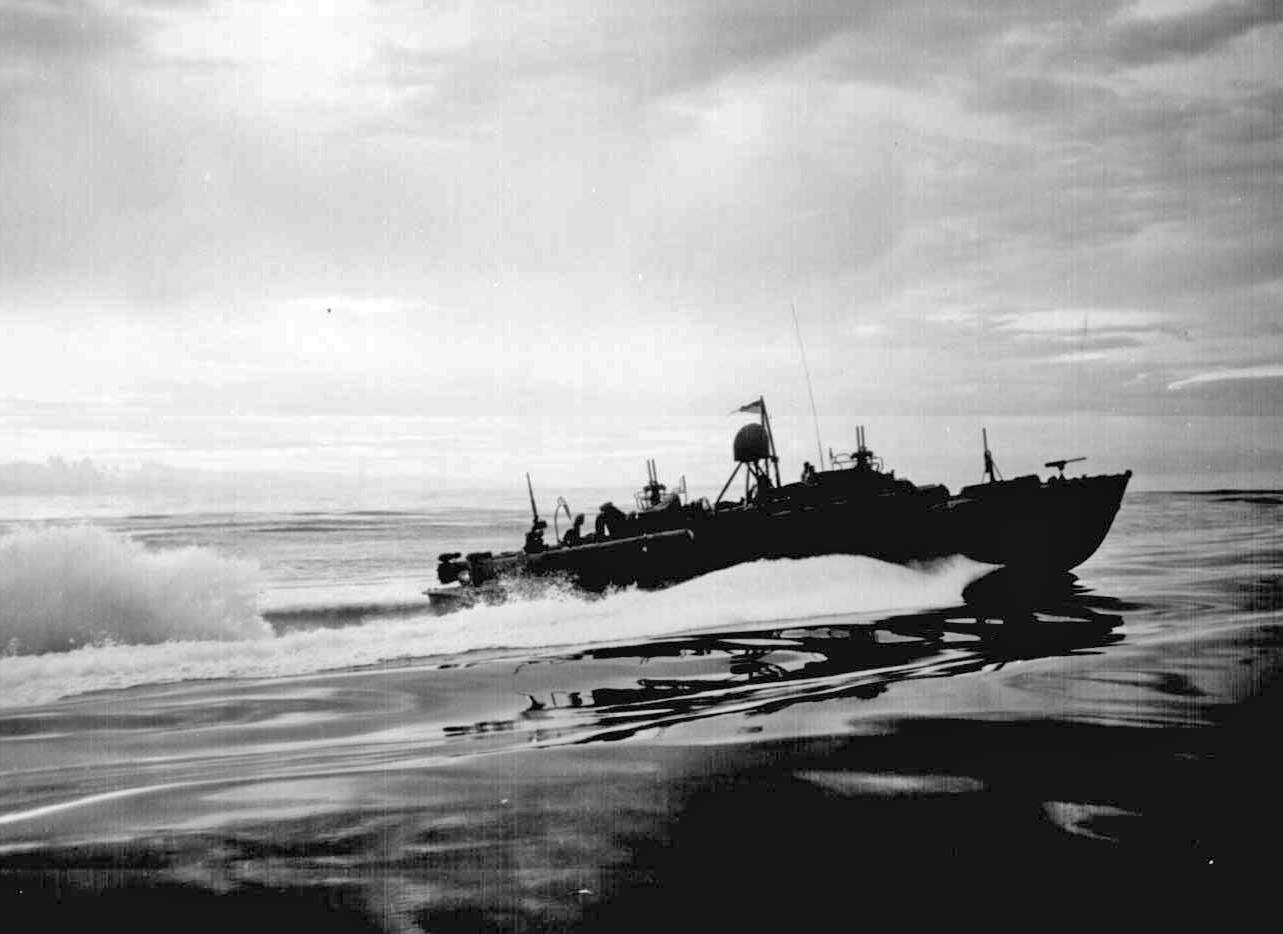
PT boat off New Guinea in 1943

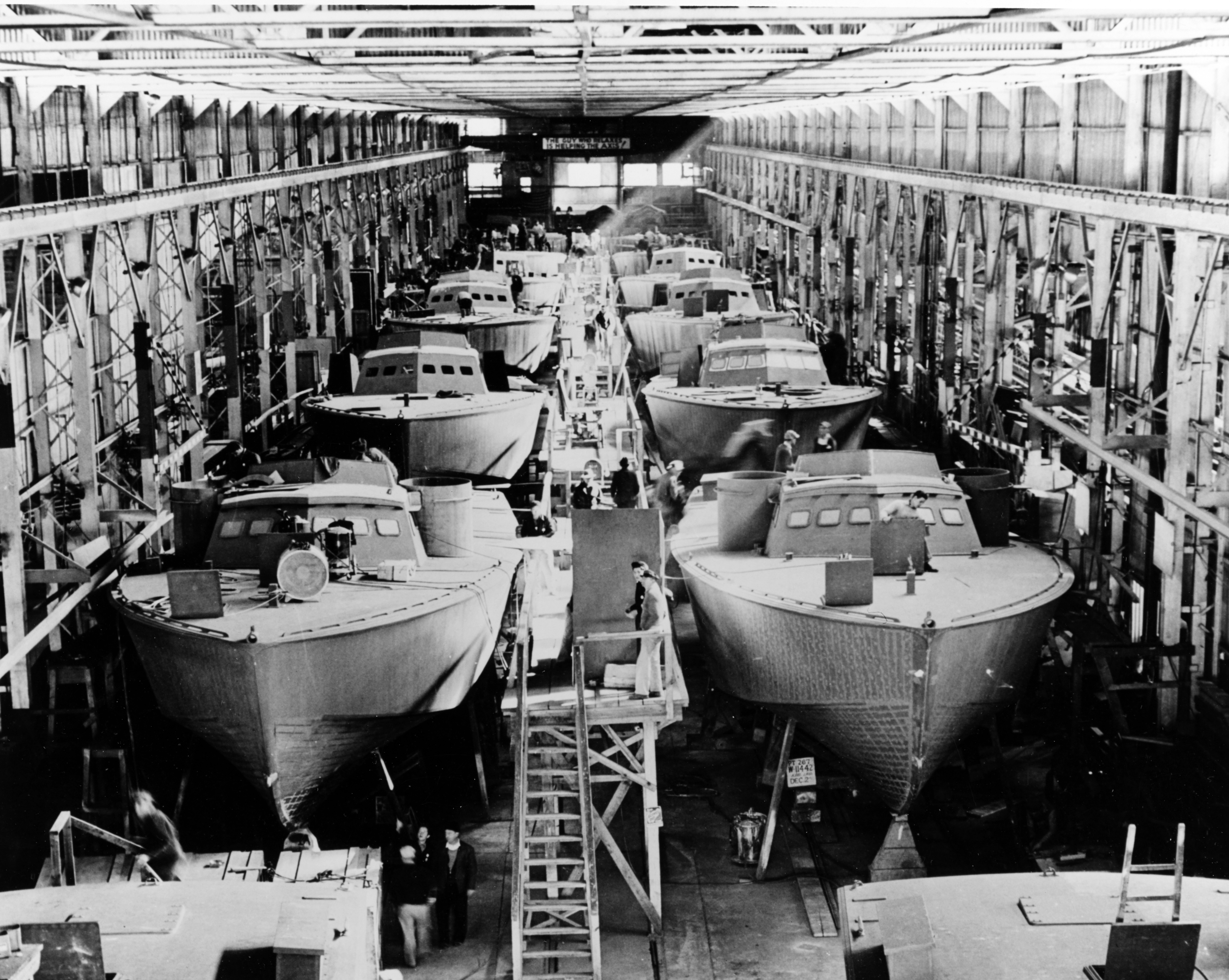
Higgins PT Boats in City Park, New Orleans in 1943

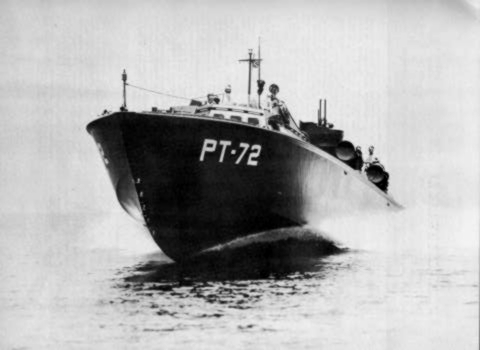
PT 72

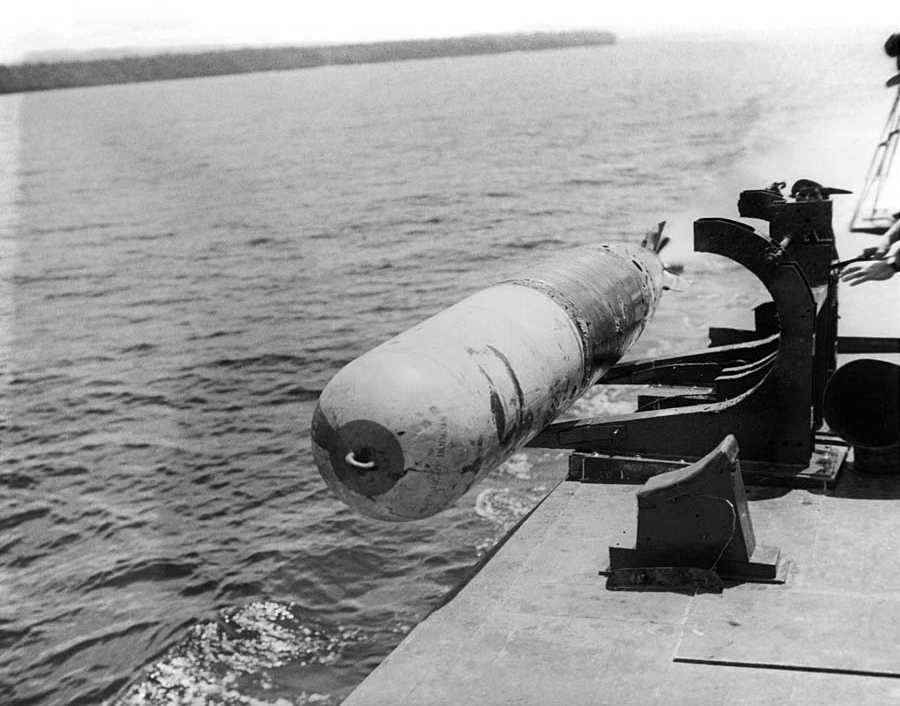
Mark 13 torpedo launched from PT boat in 1943

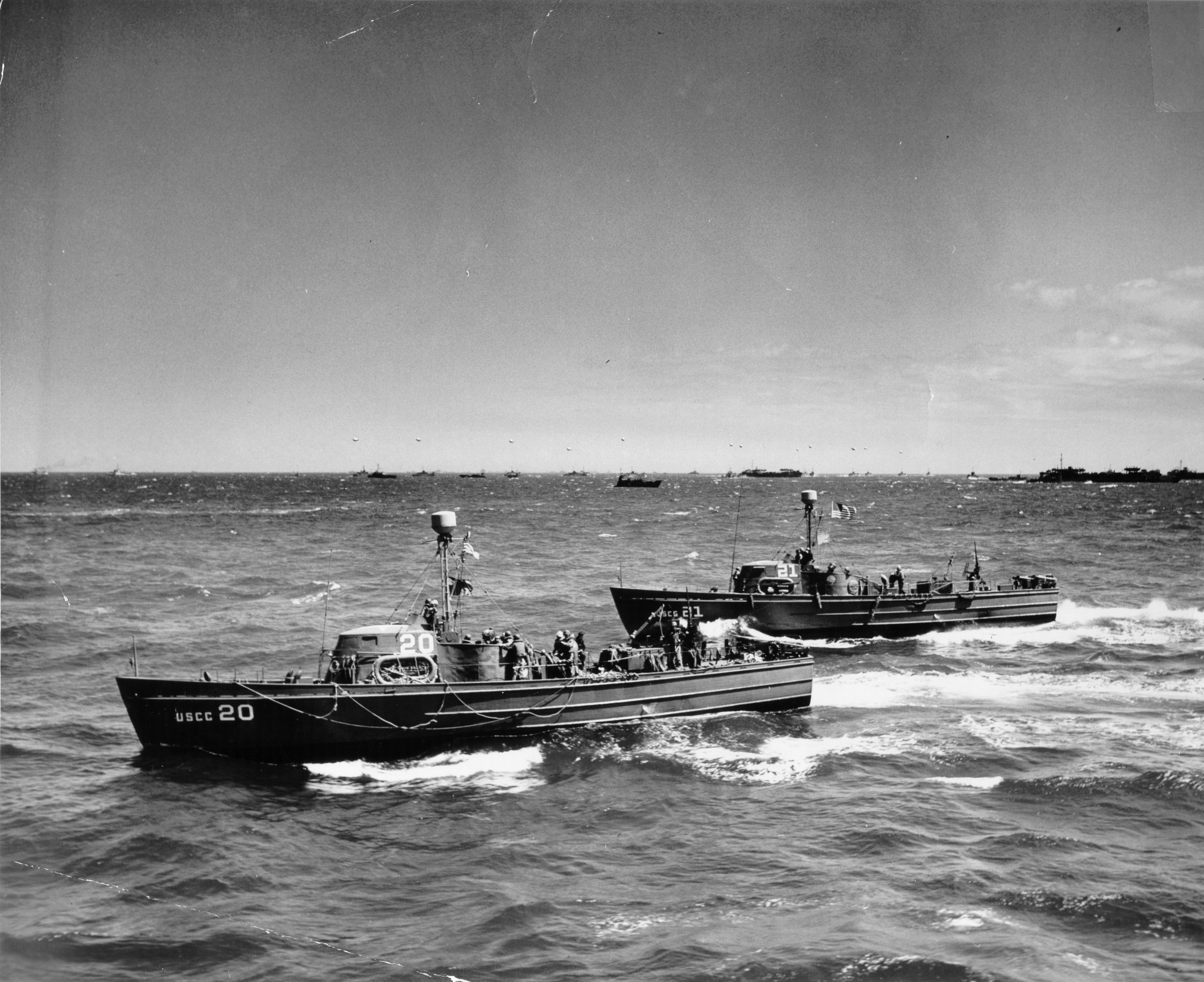
83-foot patrol boats, USCG-20 and USCG-21 off Normandy

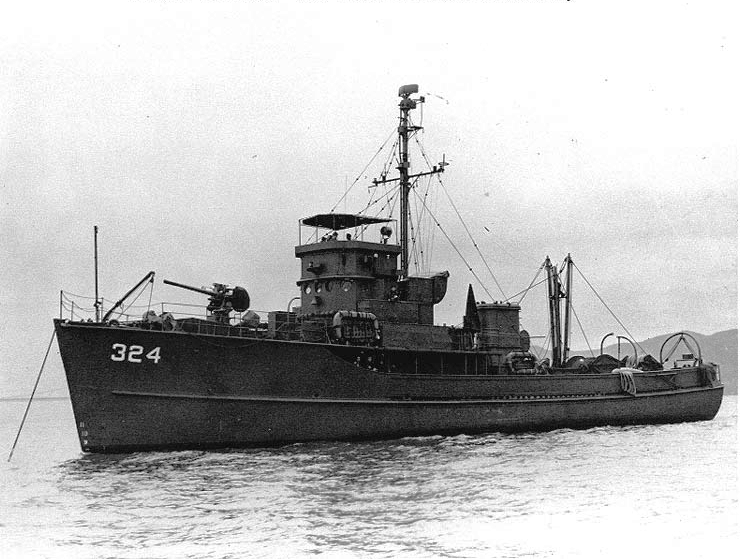
YMS-324 Minesweeper

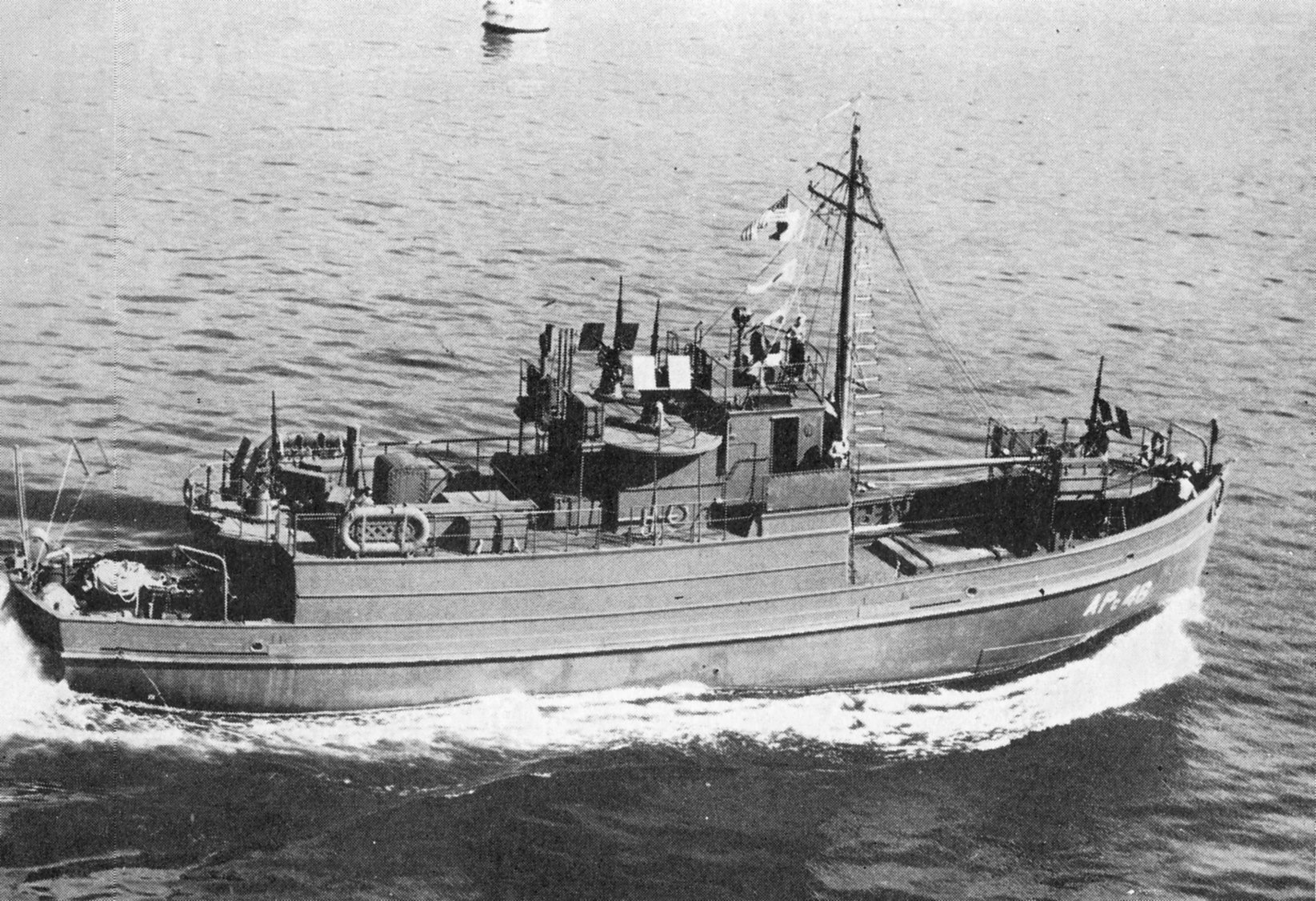
USS APc-46 APc-1-class small coastal transport

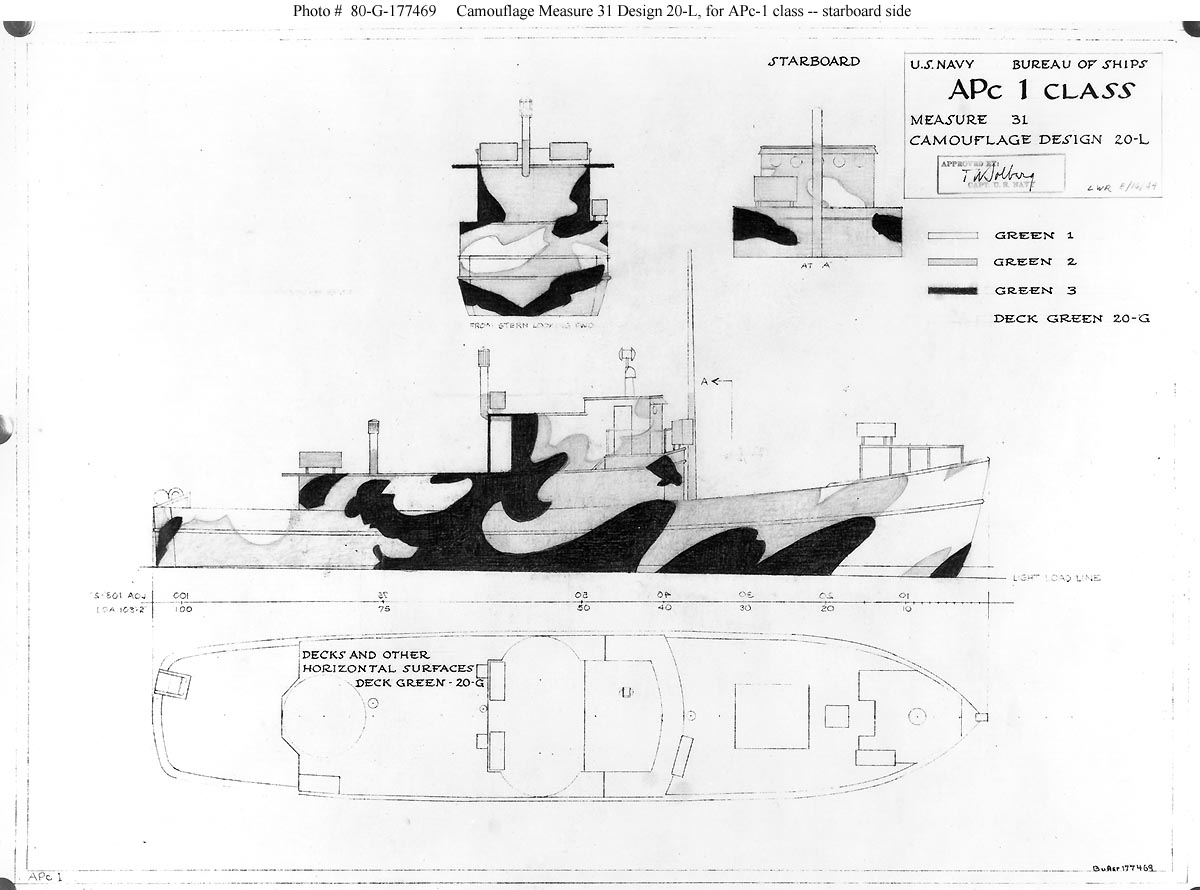
APc-1-class small coastal transport

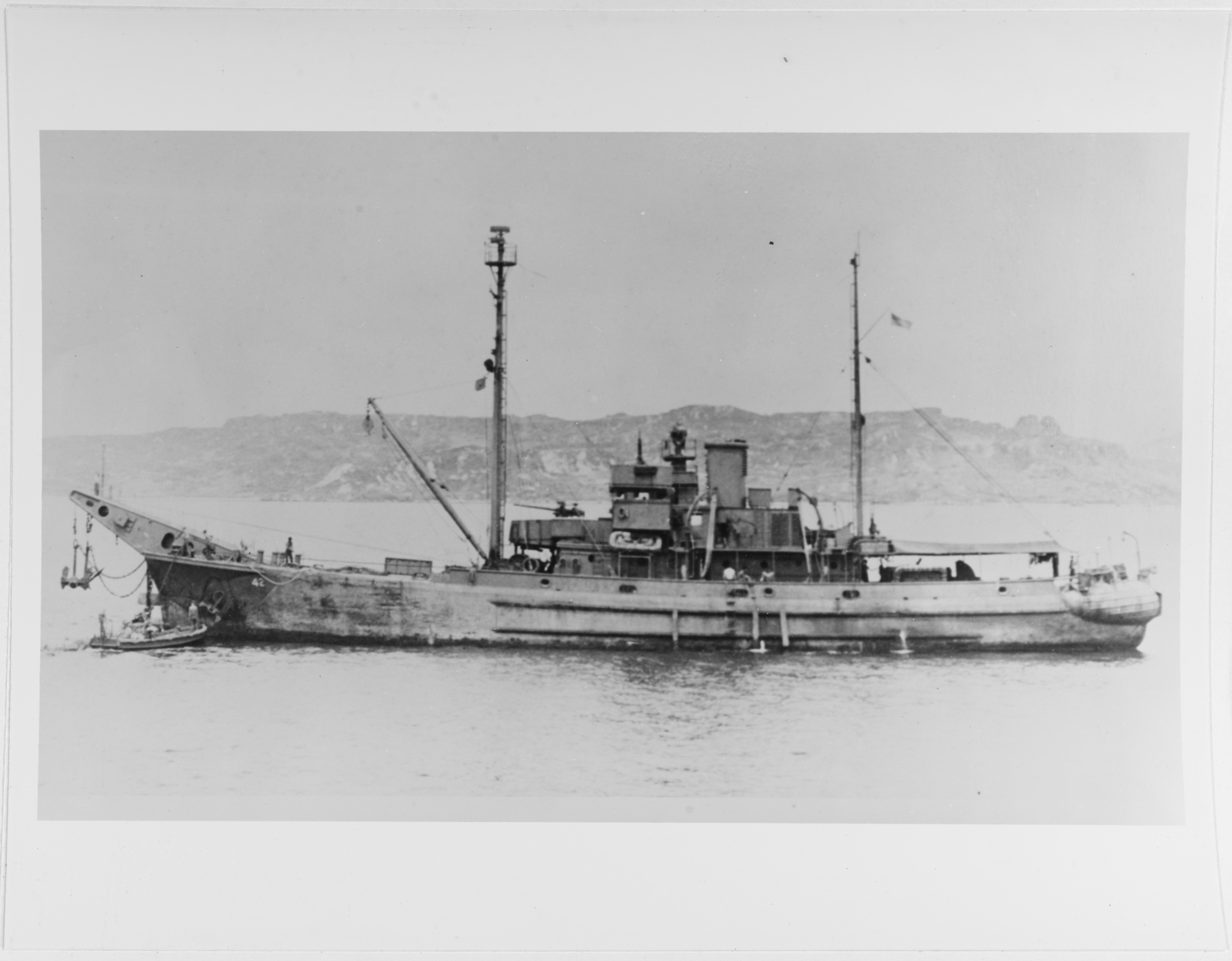
USS Cliffrose net layer in 1945

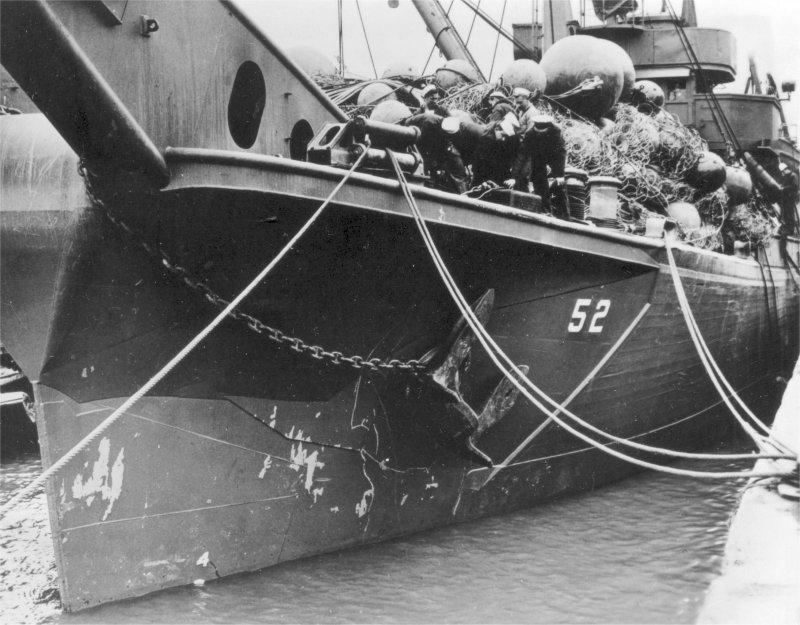
USS Snowbell (AN-52) net layer

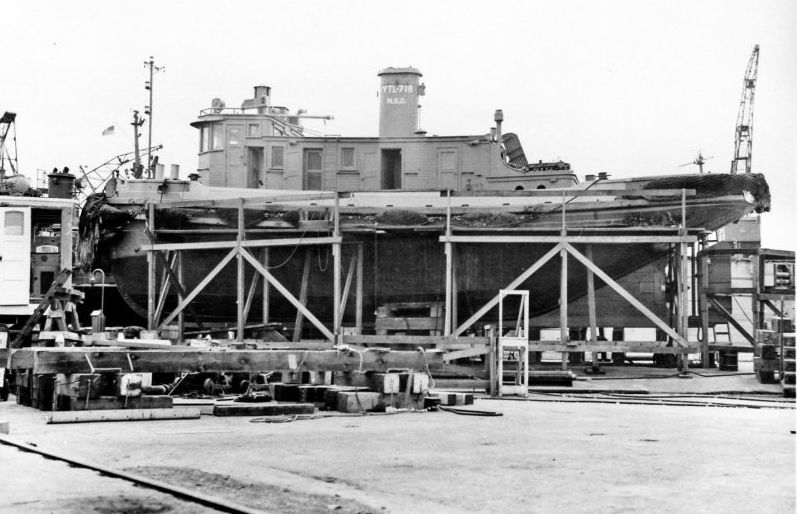
Wooden YTL-718 tugboat

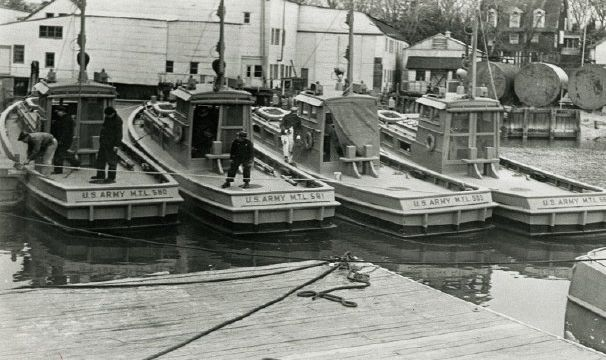
US Army Motor Towing Launch (MTL) Tugs in 1944

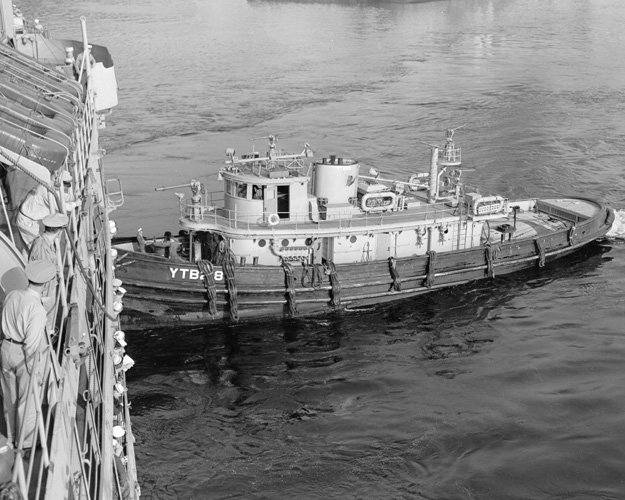
USS Cahto (YTB-215) tug

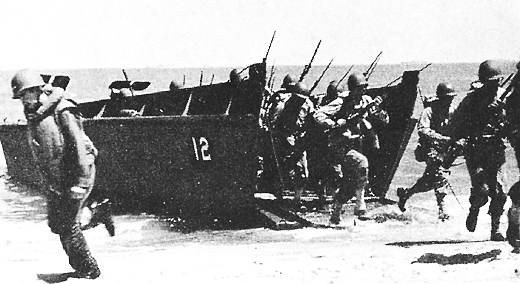
Beach landing of a LCVP-1

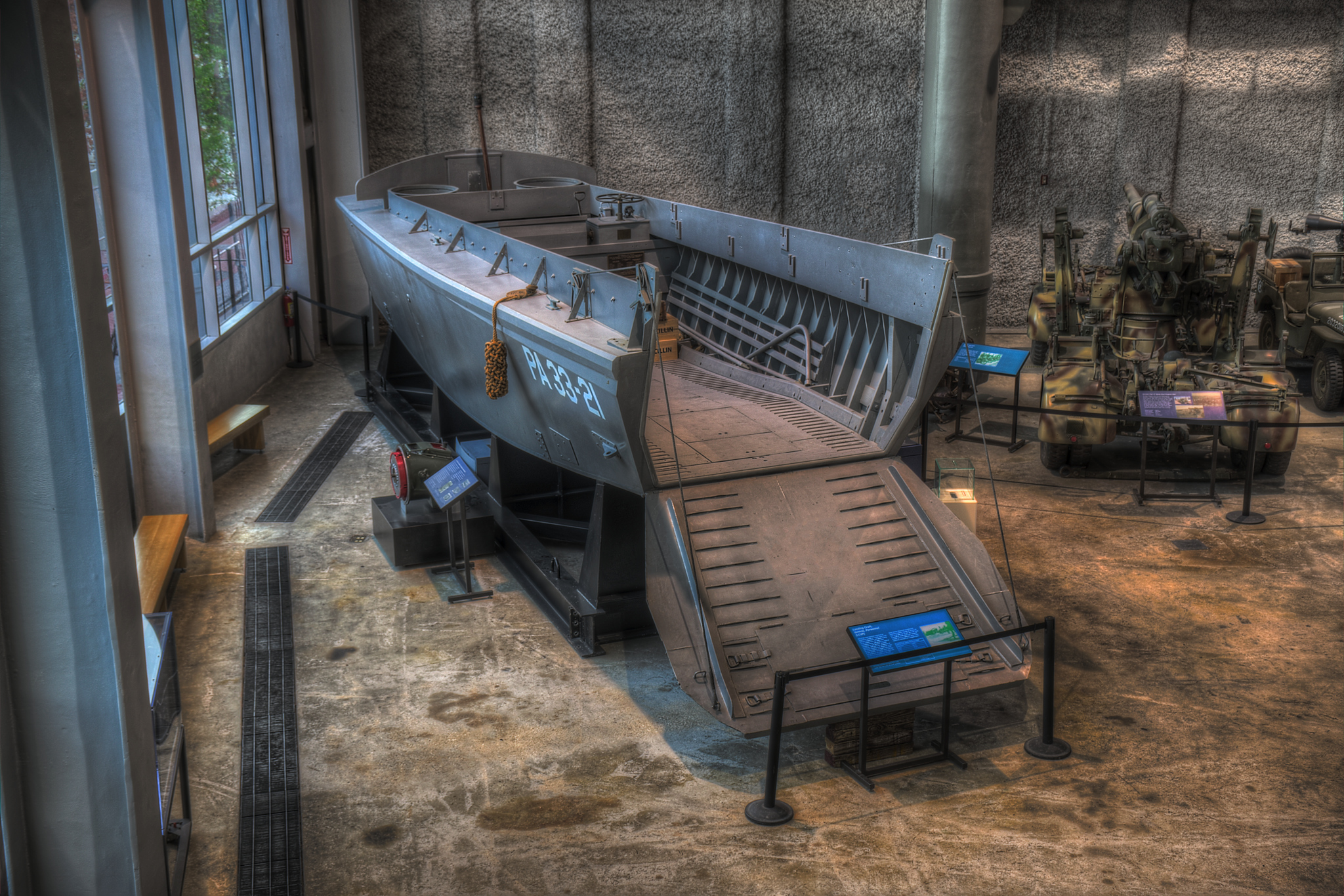
LCVP-1 at WW II museum

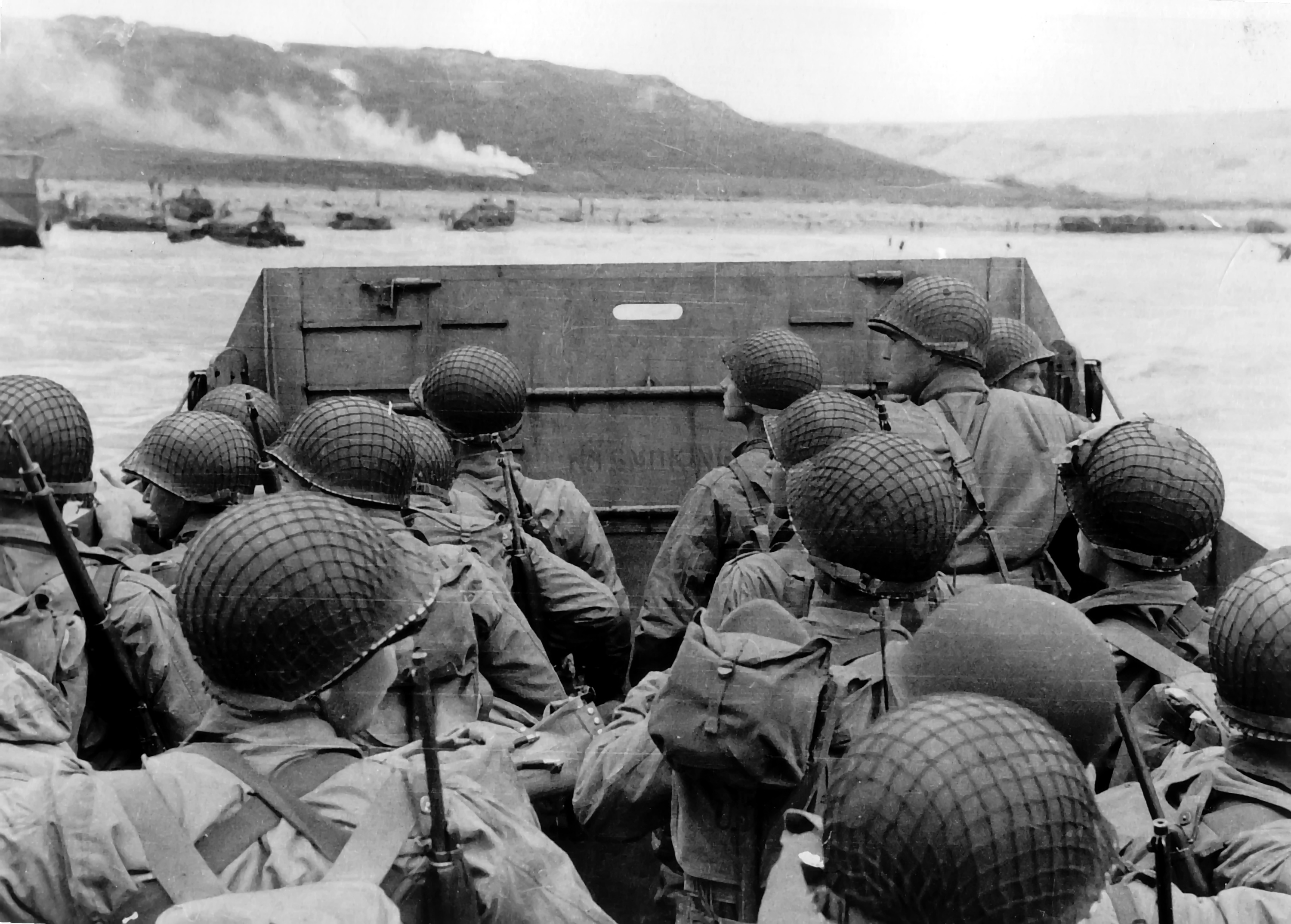
LCVP-1 approaching Omaha beach

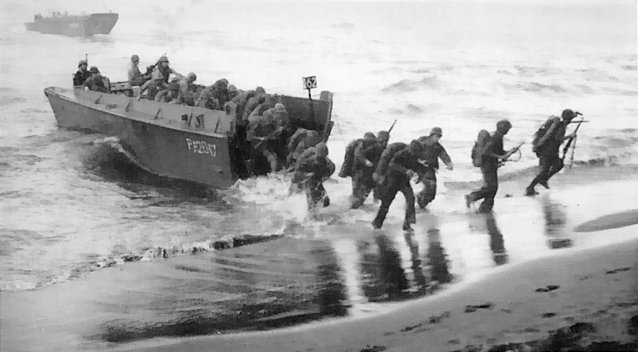
Beach landing of a LCVP-1 at Bougainville campaign

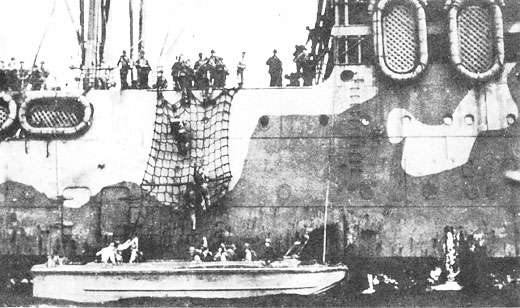
Marines load in LCP(L) off Fiji Islands on 26 July 1942

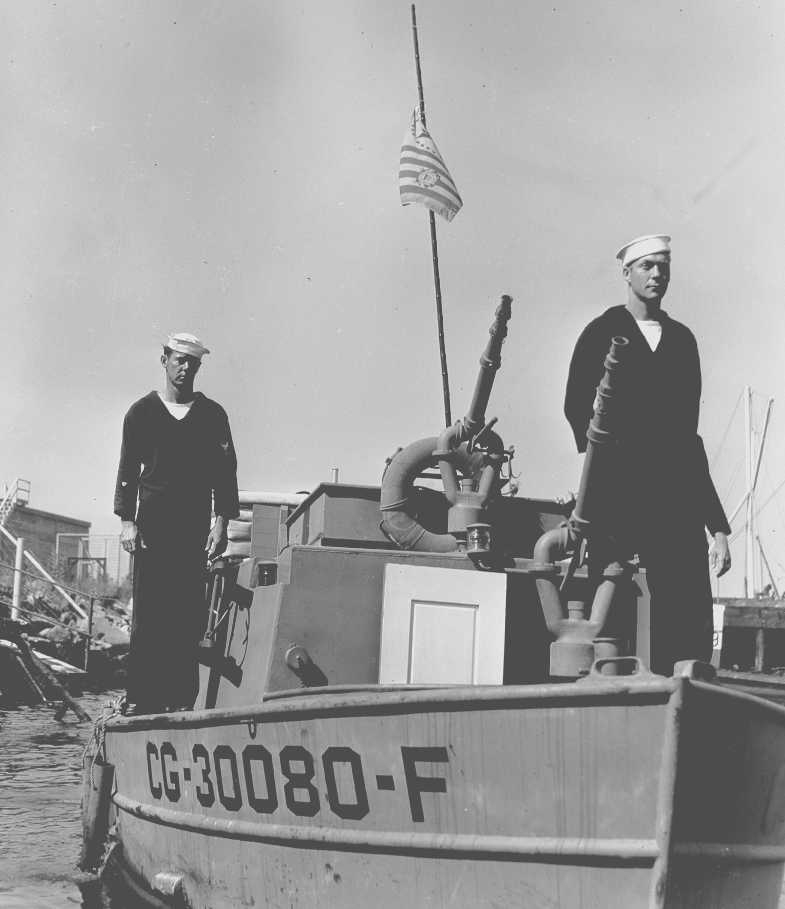
World War II USCG fireboat

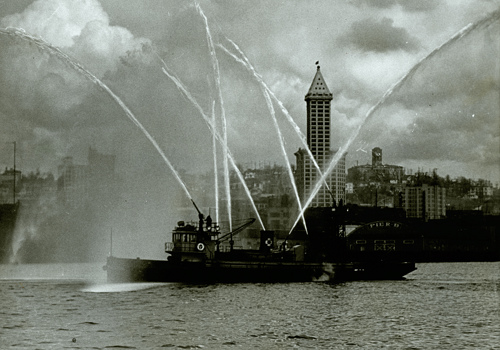
Fireboat Alki in 1940

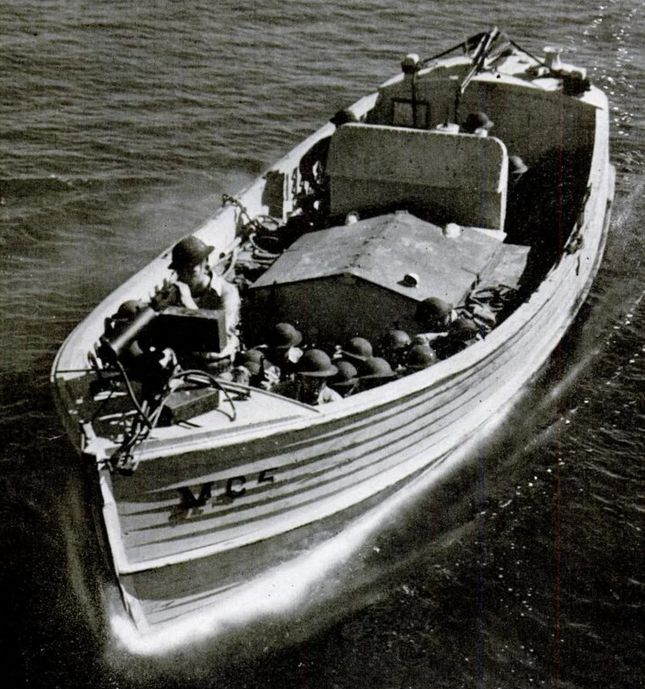
Navy shore launch Boat with marines in 1941

== Boat builders ==
Wooden boat builders of World War II:

Company	City	State
American Machinery	Beresford	Florida
Cambridge Shipbuilders	Cambridge	Maryland
Camden Shipbuilding	Cambridge	Massachusetts
Continental Shipbuilding	Brooklyn	New York
Daytona Beach Boat Works	Daytona Beach	Florida
Delaware Bay Shipbuilding	Leesburg	Virginia
Dooley's Basin & Dry Dock	Fort Lauderdale	Florida
East Coast Shipyards	Bayonne	New Jersey
Elizabeth City Shipyard	Elizabeth City	North Carolina
Gar Wood	Algonac	Michigan
Harris & Parsons	East Greenwich	Rhode Island
John & Associates	Rye	New York
Knutson Shipbuilding	Halesite	New York
Lancaster Ironworks	Perryville	Massachusetts
Manteo Boatbuilding	Manteo	North Carolina
Miami Shipbuilding	Miami	Florida
Moyer & Son	Ocean City	New Jersey
Muzzio Bros.	Stamford	Connecticut
New Jersey Shipbuilding	Barber	New Jersey
Northeast Shipbuilding	QuiNorth Carolinay	Massachusetts
Penn-Jersey Shipbuilding	Camden	New Jersey
Perkins & Virginiaughan	Wickford	Rhode Island
Robinson, W. A.	Ipswich	Massachusetts
Simms Bros.	Dorchester	Massachusetts
Sullivan Drydock & Repair	Brooklyn	New York
Ventnor Boat Works	Atlantic City	New Jersey
Warren Boat Yard	Warren	Rhode Island
Wheeler Shipbuilding	Whitestone	New York
Allen Boat Company	Harvey	Louisiana
Decatur Iron & Steel	Decatur	Alabama
Pendleton Shipyard Company	New Orleans	Louisiana
Rice Brothers Company	Rockport	Texas
Smith's Shipyard	Pensacola	Florida
Warren Fish	Pensacola	Florida
American Cruiser	Trenton	Michigan
Defoe Shipbuilding Company	Bay City	Michigan
Bison Shipbuilding	Buffalo	New York
Chrysler Corp.	Detroit	Michigan
Darby Steel Product	Kansas City	Kansas
Eddy Shipbuilding	Bay City	Michigan
Erie Concrete & Supply	Erie	Pennsylvania
Fisher Boatworks	Detroit	Michigan
Inland Waterways	Duluth	Minnesota
Kansas City Steel	Kansas City	Kansas
Kewaunee Shipbuilding	Kewaunee	Wisconsin
Mount Vernon Bridge & Iron	Ironton	Ohio
Niagara Shipbuilding	Buffalo	New York
Northwest Engineering	Green Bay	Wisconsin
Odenbach Shipbuilding	Rochester	New York
Omaha Steel Works	Omaha	Nebraska
Peterson & Haecker	Memphis	Nebraska
Pidgeon-Thomas Iron Works	Memphis	Tennessee
Pullman Company	Chicago	Illinois
Quincy Bargebuilders	Quincy	Illinois
Stadium Yacht Basin	Quincy	Ohio
Zenith Dredge Company	Duluth	Minnesota
Ackerman Boat Company	Newport Beach	California
Anacortes Shipways	Anacortes	Washington
Barbee Marine Yards	Renton	Washington
Basalt Rock Company	Napa	California
Birchfield Shipbuilding	Tacoma	Washington
Chilson Shipyard	Hoquiam	Washington
Cryer & Sons	Oakland	California
Fulton Shipyard	Antioch	California
Eureka Shipbuilding	Fields Landing	California
Harbor Boat Building Company	San Pedro	California
San Pedro Boatworks	San Pedro	California
Fellows & Stewart	San Pedro	California
Everett Pacific Shipbuilding	Everett	Washington
Gig Harbor Shipbuilding	Gig Harbor	Washington
Grays Harbor Shipbuilding	Aberdeen	Washington
Colberg Boat Works	Stockton	California
Hickinbotham Bros./Guntert & Zimmerman	Stockton	California
Hillstrom Shipbuilding	Coos Bay	Oregon
Hodgson-Greene-Haldeman	Long Beach	California
Hoquiam Shipyard	Hoquiam	Washington
Kyle & Company	Stockton	California
Mojean & Ericson	Tacoma	Washington
Northwestern Shipbuilding	South Bellingham	Washington
Olson & Winge	Seattle	Washington
Pacific Bridge Company	San Francisco	California
Kneass Boat Works	San Francisco	California
Pacific Car and Foundry	Renton/Seattle/Tacoma	Washington
Peterson Shipbuilding	Tacoma	Washington
Peyton Company	Newport Beach	California
Wilmington Boat Works	Wilmington	California
San Diego Marine	San Diego	California
Lynch Shipbuilding	San Diego	California
Al Larson Boat Shop	San Pedro	California
Garbutt-Walsh Inc.	San Pedro	California
Pollock-Stockton Shipbuilding	Stockton	California
Puget Sound Boatbuilding	Tacoma	Washington
Tacoma Boatbuilding	Tacoma	Washington
Reliable Welding Works	Olympia	Washington
South Coast Shipyard	Newport Beach	California
United Concrete Pipe Corporation	Los Angeles	California
Victory Shipbuilding	Newport Beach	California
Stone Boat Yard	Alameda	California
Pacific Coast Engineering	Alameda	California
Moore Equipment Company	Stockton	California
Hunt Boat Company	Richmond	California
Madden and Lewis Company	Sausalito	California
Clyde W. Wood	Stockton	California

== See also ==
- 30' surf rescue boat
- 22nd Crash Rescue Boat Squadron
- Dumbo (air-sea rescue)
- For Those in Peril (1944 film)
- Motor torpedo boat by Vosper & Company and Thornycroft
- Coastal Forces of the Royal Navy
- Fairmile D motor torpedo boat – British "dog boats"
- Motor Launch
- E-boat, German
- Ōtori-class torpedo boat Japan
