= Hodgdon Yachts =

American shipbuilding company

- Industry: Shipbuilding
- Founded: 1816; 210 years ago Boothbay, Maine, United States
- Founder: Caleb Hodgdon
- Headquarters: East Boothbay, Maine
- Products: Yachts, custom tenders, military composites
- Services: Yacht interiors, yard services
- Owner: Timothy Hodgdon
- Website: http://www.hodgdonyachts.com

Hodgdon Shipbuilding, LLC, known as Hodgdon Yachts, is an American shipbuilding company that builds yachts and specialized military vessels, based in East Boothbay, Maine. It is a family-run business founded in 1816—the oldest continuously operating family boatbuilder in the United States, predating the Burger Boat Company by 47 years.

Hodgdon Yachts is noted for building superyachts, both sail and power, using advanced composite materials and construction techniques. It's also noted for its ability to incorporate those advanced materials into traditional designs that employ modern electronic and mechanical marine systems. The company has several divisions—yachts, custom tenders, yacht interiors, yacht services and military composites with offices in Boothbay, Maine, Newport, Rhode Island and Monaco.

== History ==
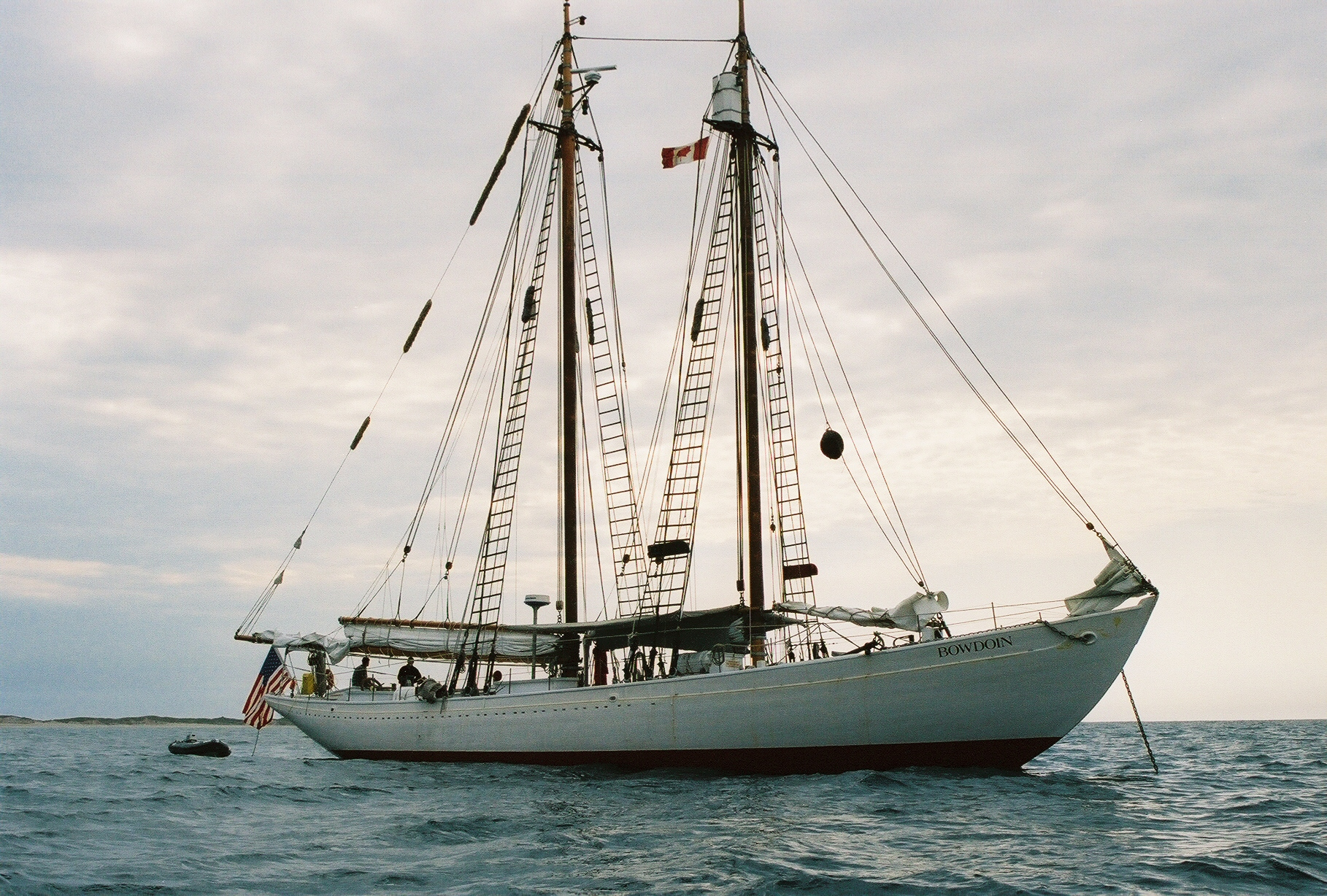
Bowdoin at anchor off Sable Island, Nova Scotia

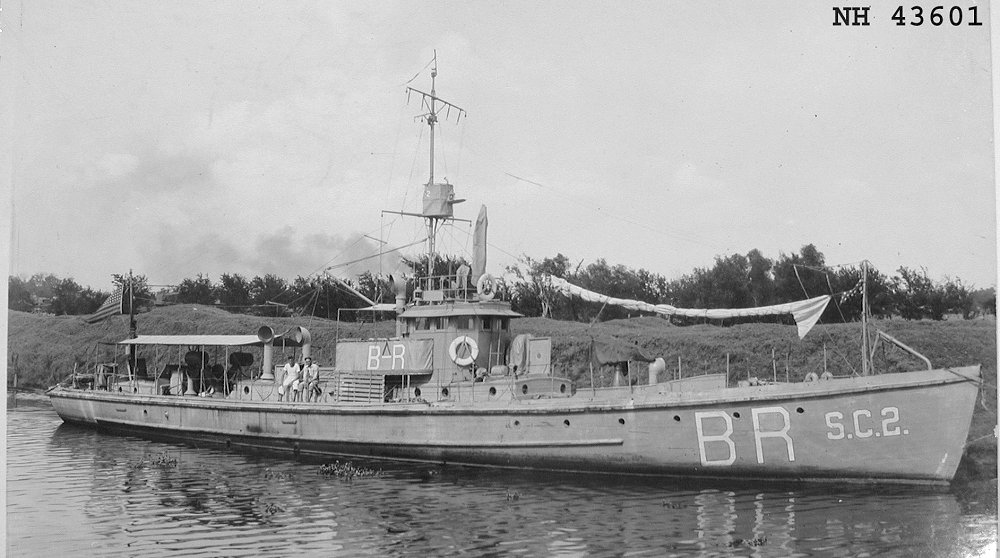
SC 2 submarine chaser

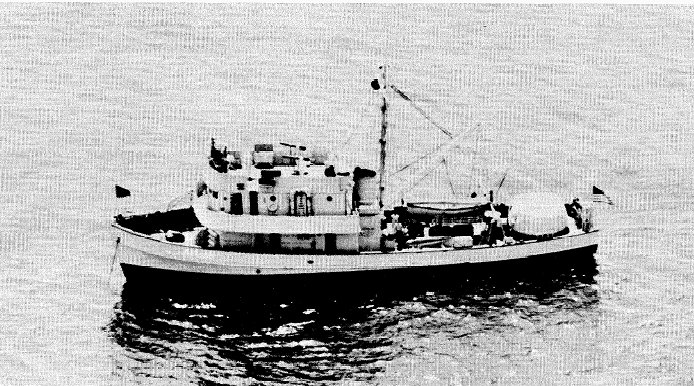
The USS Accentor

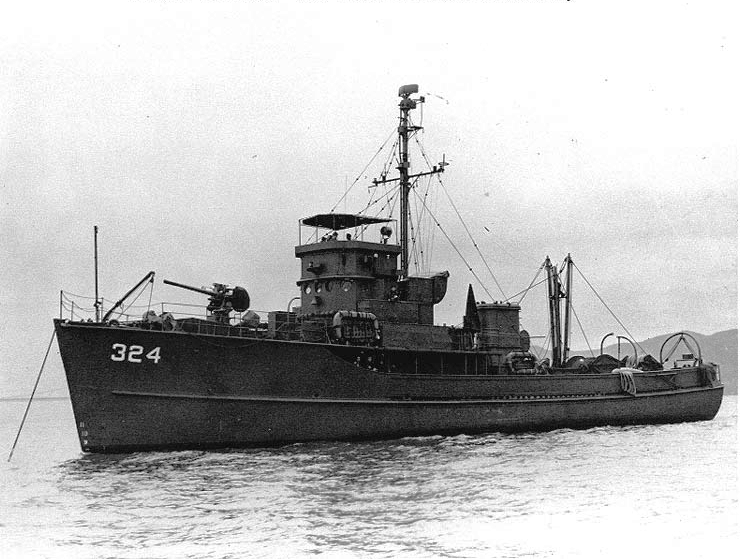
YMS-1-class minesweeper, USS YMS-324

In 1816, founder, Caleb Hodgdon with brother Tyler, added boatbuilding as "Hodgdon Brothers" in East Boothbay on the Damariscotta River to Caleb's sawmill and gristmill businesses with the construction of a 42-foot "pinky" fishing schooner, Union, launched in 1818. From 1850 and 1895 the yard built and launched 24 commercial schooners. Caleb turned the business over to sons, C. George and James P. Hodgdon, in 1870. Successive generations of Hodgdons maintained the business, as siblings left and returned from boatbuilding enterprises, elsewhere in Maine.

The business regained vitality during the Korean War, when it built twelve naval patrol boats. A fire destroyed most of the yard's buildings and records in 1954 during this run of producing patrol boats. Within three years, brothers William and Charles, and George I., Sr. died.

George I. ("Sonny") Hodgdon, Jr., who was born in 1922 and reputedly started work in the yard at an early age, rebuilt the boatbuilding sheds and obtained a contract to build the first boat designed by William Tripp Sr., Katingo. In addition to securing contracts to build boats for noted designers, including Sparkman & Stephens, John Alden, and L. Francis Herreshoff, he designed and built 24 small vessels, between 1956 and 1969. In 1969, Hodgdon moved to another facility to build lobster boats under the business name of "G.I. Hodgdon, Co."

Hodgdon's son, Timothy, joined the business In 1979 and steered the company towards modern materials. He continued after his father died in 1995 and, as business grew, diversified the company into six divisions, specializing in yacht construction, custom tenders, yacht interiors, boatyard services, and composite materials for military customers. He established a variety of locations in Maine, Rhode Island, and Monaco.

In 2016, a sixth-generation Hodgdon family member to participate in the firm, Audrey Hodgdon, was appointed as director of sales and marketing.

== Notable vessels ==
The business built most of its notable vessels under the name, "Hodgdon Brothers", through the 1970s and then, with the advent of Timothy Hodgdon and diversification, continued under the corporate banner of "Hodgdon Shipbuilding."

=== Hodgdon Brothers ===
The vessels built in East Boothbay at the Hodgdon Brothers shipyard were predominantly wood construction and included fishing vessels, an arctic schooner, small naval vessels, and several yachts.

==== Schooners ====
Hodgdon Brothers yard was building wooden schooners well into the 20th century, they included:

- The fishing schooner, Elizabeth W. Hunan, was the last of a series of five vessels built for the Nunan family, which ran a fishing enterprise out of Cape Porpoise, Maine. The 96-foot auxiliary powered vessel was launched in 1908 and reportedly was in service for 30 years. It had an 80-horsepower Globe auxiliary engine, which could propel her at 9 miles per hour.
- The schooner, Bowdoin, was designed by William H. Hand, Jr., and built in 1921. It is the only American schooner built specifically for Arctic exploration, and was designed under the direction of explorer Donald B. MacMillan. As of 2015, it had made 29 trips above the Arctic Circle, three since it was acquired by the Maine Maritime Academy (MMA) in 1988. As of 2015, it was based in Castine, Maine, where it is used for the MMA sail training curriculum.

==== Naval ships ====
Hodgdon Brothers built wood-hulled naval patrol boats, starting in World War I through the Korean War. Wooden hulls do not activate magnetic detonators on mines or torpedoes. They were, as follows:

- Two SC-1-class submarine chasers, SC-137—commissioned December 14, 1917—and SC-138—commissioned January 24, 1918. The SC-1 class was a class of submarine chasers produced during World War I for the United States Navy in order to combat attacks by German U-boats, with 441 boats built from 1917 to 1919. They were 110 ft (34 m) overall and carried one 3-inch (76.2-mm)/23-caliber gun mount, two Colt .30 caliber (7.62 mm) machine guns and one Y-gun depth charge projector.
- A 97 ft 1 in (29.59 m) Accentor-class minesweeper, in partnership with neighboring shipyard, Goudy and Stevens. It was named, USS Combat (AMc-69), launched on 6 October 1941 and renamed USS Bulwark (AMc-68). It carried two .50 cal. M2 Browning machine guns.
- Twelve YMS-1-class minesweepers with a 136 ft (41 m) overall length, armed with one 3-inch/50 caliber gun mount, two 20 mm guns and two depth charge projectors in the 1950s.
- Troopships, 22 APc-1-class small coastal transports ships.

==== Yachts ====
Hodgdon Brothers specialized in building wooden yachts. The 1960s began a transition to fiberglass yachts.

- The 67-foot motor yacht, Maimelee, was at its launching in 1961 the largest fiberglass yacht in the world. The hull was molded in England, shipped to East Boothbay and finished by Hodgdon Brothers. It was equipped with twin 308-horsepower diesel engines, air conditioning for cruising in southern waters and an electronic suite that included a radio direction finder, a fathometer and radar.
- Noted naval architect, John Alden, chose Hodgdon Brothers to build two schooners and one sloop. In 1975, Alden selected Hodgdon Brothers to build a fiberglass 61-foot motorsailer yacht.

=== Hodgdon Shipbuilding ===
Comanche leaving Newport, Rhode Island for Plymouth, England in the 2015 Rolex Transatlantic Race

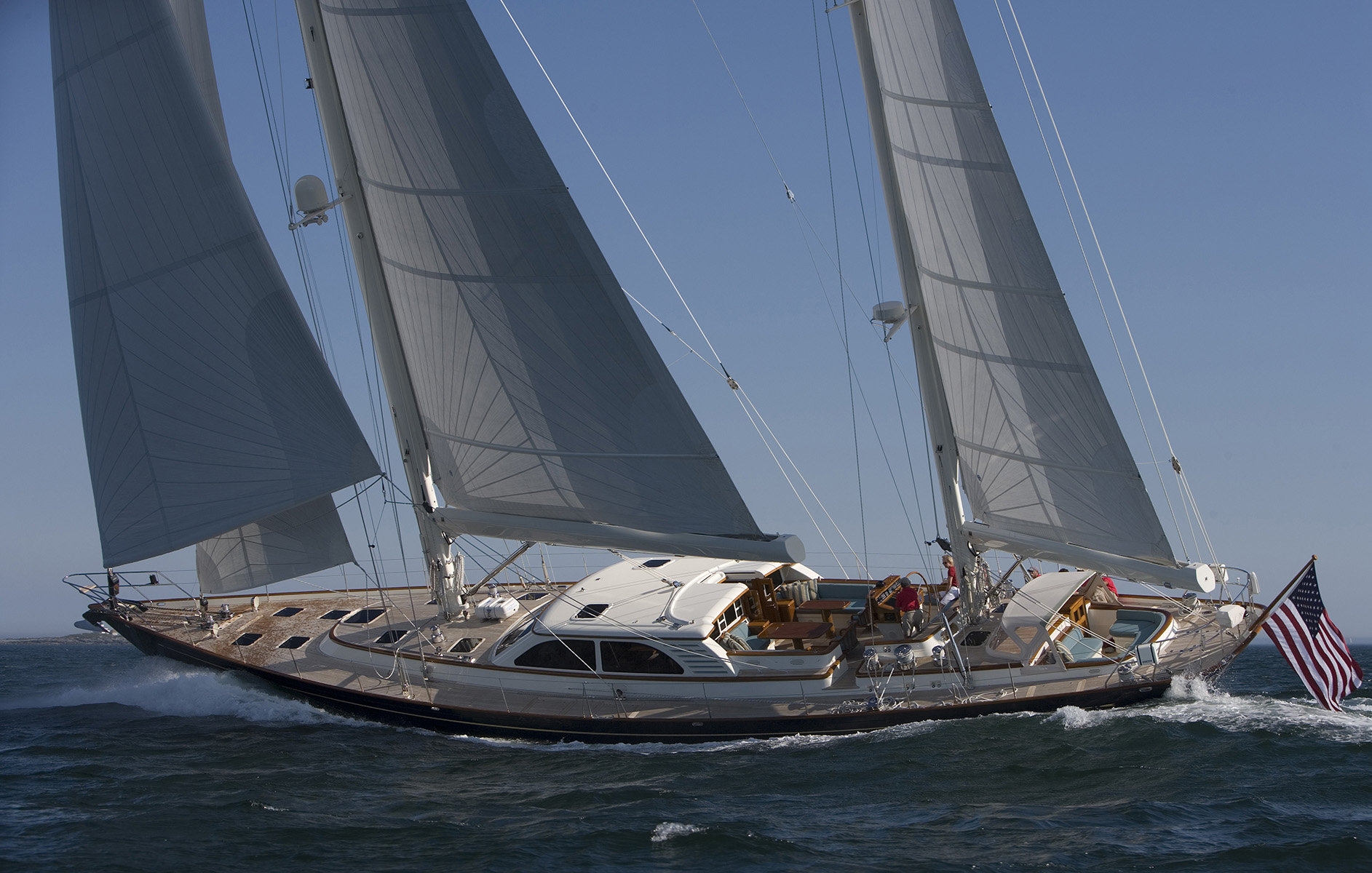
Windcrest near Bar Harbor, Maine

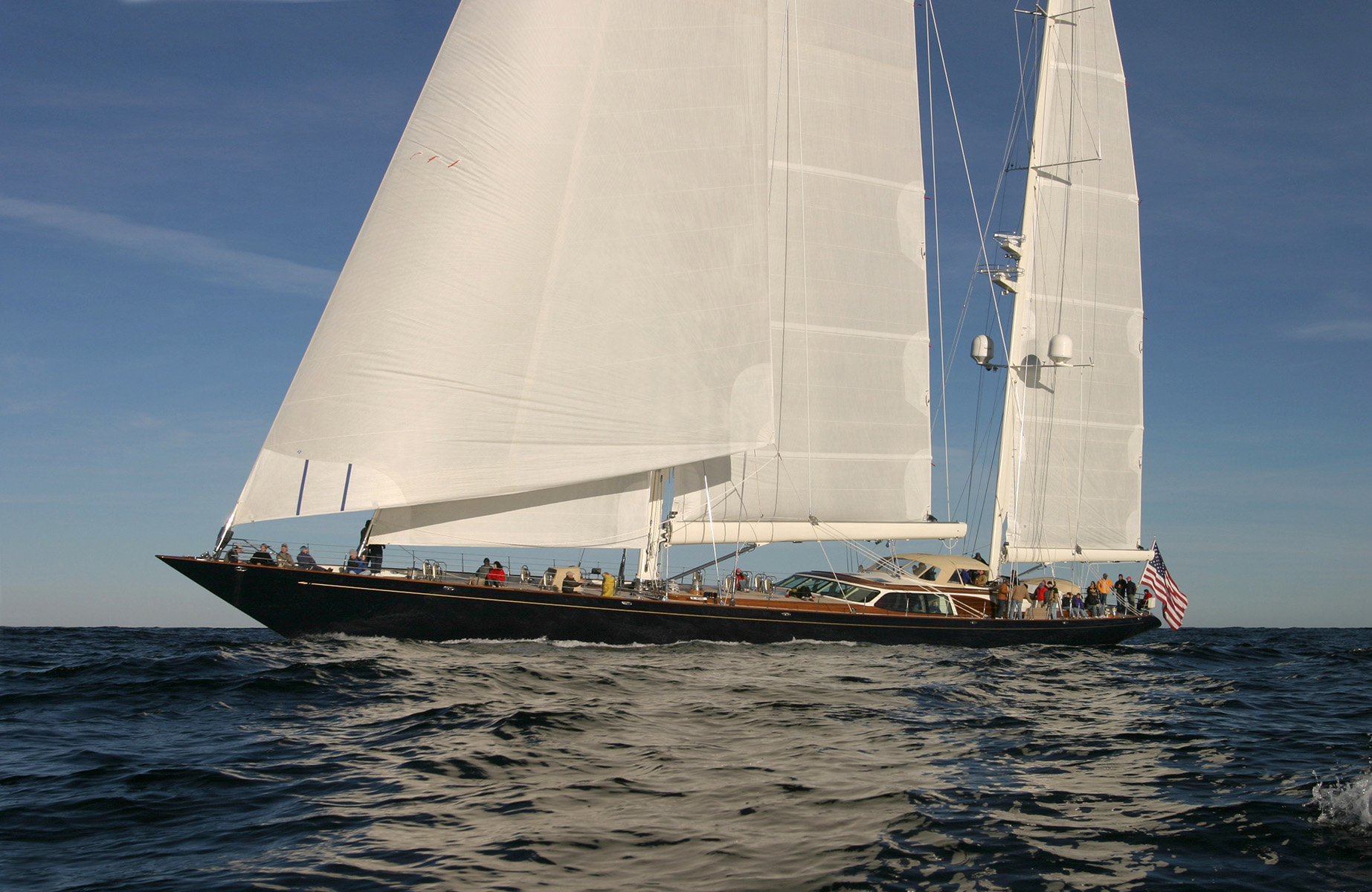
Scheherazade during sea trials

The company's adoption of composite technology began in 1984 with the order of an 83-foot composite motor yacht, which was launched as Yorel, and which required a bigger yard building, new boatbuilding technology and a high standard of craftsmanship. This project marked the change in boatbuilding approach by president-to-be, Timothy Hodgdon, then 29 years old. Yorel returned to Hodgdon Yard, renamed as Kizbul, for a major refit in 2013.

The company offers yacht and tender building and repair services under the name, Hodgdon Yachts, and military vessel construction and composite components for vessels under the name, Hodgdon Defense Composites.

==== Yachts ====
The company's yacht division is known as "Hodgdon Yachts"; notable projects include:

- Comanche—100-foot monohull, launched October, 2014—was designed by VPLP and Guillaume Verdier and was completed within 13 months. With an overall length of 100 feet (30 m), Comanche vied to be the world's fastest monohull with a 24-hour distance record of 620 nautical miles (1,150 km) during a 2015 race across the Atlantic, subject to ratification by the World Sailing Speed Record Council. In December, 2014 it placed second in the annual Sydney to Hobart Yacht Race. In 2015, it was first in the same race, covering 628 nautical miles in just under two days and nine hours. With a 25.5-foot (7.8 m) beam it achieves speed similar to performance multihull sailing craft by being sailed heeled one on one edge to minimize wetted surface. In April, 2015 Comanche broke the course record at the Les Voiles de Saint Barth yacht race. At the time of its building, Comanche's hull represented "one of the largest single-hull infusions" [of composite materials] performed in the United States.
- Windcrest—98-foot ketch, launched July, 2008—was designed by Fontaine Design Group. The vessel employs composite (cold-molded, wood-epoxy) construction and was 406th vessel launched by the Hodgdon family since 1816. As specified by owners, it was designed for extensive coastal cruising. It features an interior joinery of cherry and walnut with fabrics and leather complementing the natural woods. The yacht features hydraulic, electrical, water, mechanical, communications and ventilation systems, together with push-button sail-handling, satellite e-mail communications systems for entertainment, phone and e-mail, all monitored with a computer network with nine screens. It placed third out of 47 sailing superyachts in the 2015 St Barths Bucket Regatta, a "gentlemen's" yacht race.
- Scheherazade—154-foot (47 m) ketch, launched September, 2003—was designed by naval architect, Bruce King, and built with composite construction, using "western red cedar, Douglas fir, divinycell, balsa core and carbon, all epoxied and vacuum bagged" to mold the hull structure. The interior features sycamore and walnut with many carved decorative features. Scheherazade participated in the 2008 Superyacht Cup Ulysses Nardin in Palma de Mallorca and, in 2012 and 2013, twice won the Shipyard Cup in Boothbay Harbor. It was renamed Asolare in 2014. At the time of its launching, Scheherazade was reportedly the largest sailing yacht built in the Americas.
- Antonisa—124-foot (38 m) sloop, launched August, 1999—was designed by Bruce King for an Italian owner, who reportedly was drawn to Hodgdon's reputation. It features detailed interior and exterior woodwork—matched with exotic, advanced materials that include aluminum honeycomb composites and carbon-fiber—and a pipe organ in the cabin.
- Liberty—80-foot (24 m) commuter, launched 1997—was designed by Bruce King and is described by the builder as having a "strong, light hull with distinct round transom" and top and cruising speeds of 33 knots and 25 knots, respectively. The design employs a narrow beam to allow the craft to slice through seas at a higher speed than vessels of similar displacement. The hull is laminated with cedar and mahogany. The construction saves weight with an aluminum honeycomb deck having a teak veneer that resembles traditional wood deck planking. Additionally, the underwater foils and shaft struts are of carbon fiber, instead of bronze. Yachting Magazine chose Liberty as one of its dozen notable yachts, stating that it "celebrates the great commuter yachts of the 1920s and 1930s—a significant period of yachting history—yet she is built of modern materials, employs up-to-date engines and systems.... Liberty represents the best of old and new."

==== Tenders ====
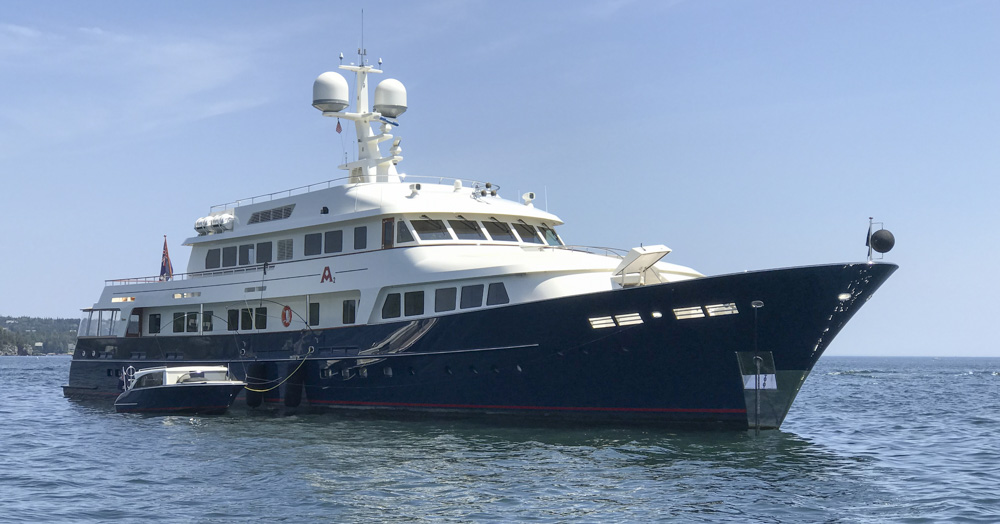
Feadship yacht, A2, with Hodgdon Yachts "Mini Venetian Limo Tender"

As a result of building a custom yacht tender—a vessel that ferries passengers from a large vessel to shore—for Steven Spielberg's super yacht, Seven Seas, Hodgdon saw a market for such craft and developed two tender sizes in two configurations—open and "limo" (with a roof that raises up)—from 27.8 to 34.4 feet (8.5 to 10.5 m). According to the company's specifications, their top speeds are 34 and 36 knots respectively.

==== Electric vessels ====
In 2022, Hodgdon began building the 10.5-metre (34 ft) Vita LION "performance electric day boat," which can carry eight passengers at a 22-knot cruise speed, using two 150-kilowatt (200-horsepower) electric motor drives. Vita's yacht was designed in England and is built in Italy. Its 234 kWh lithium batteries can be charged in under an hour, according to company specs.

==== Military vessels ====
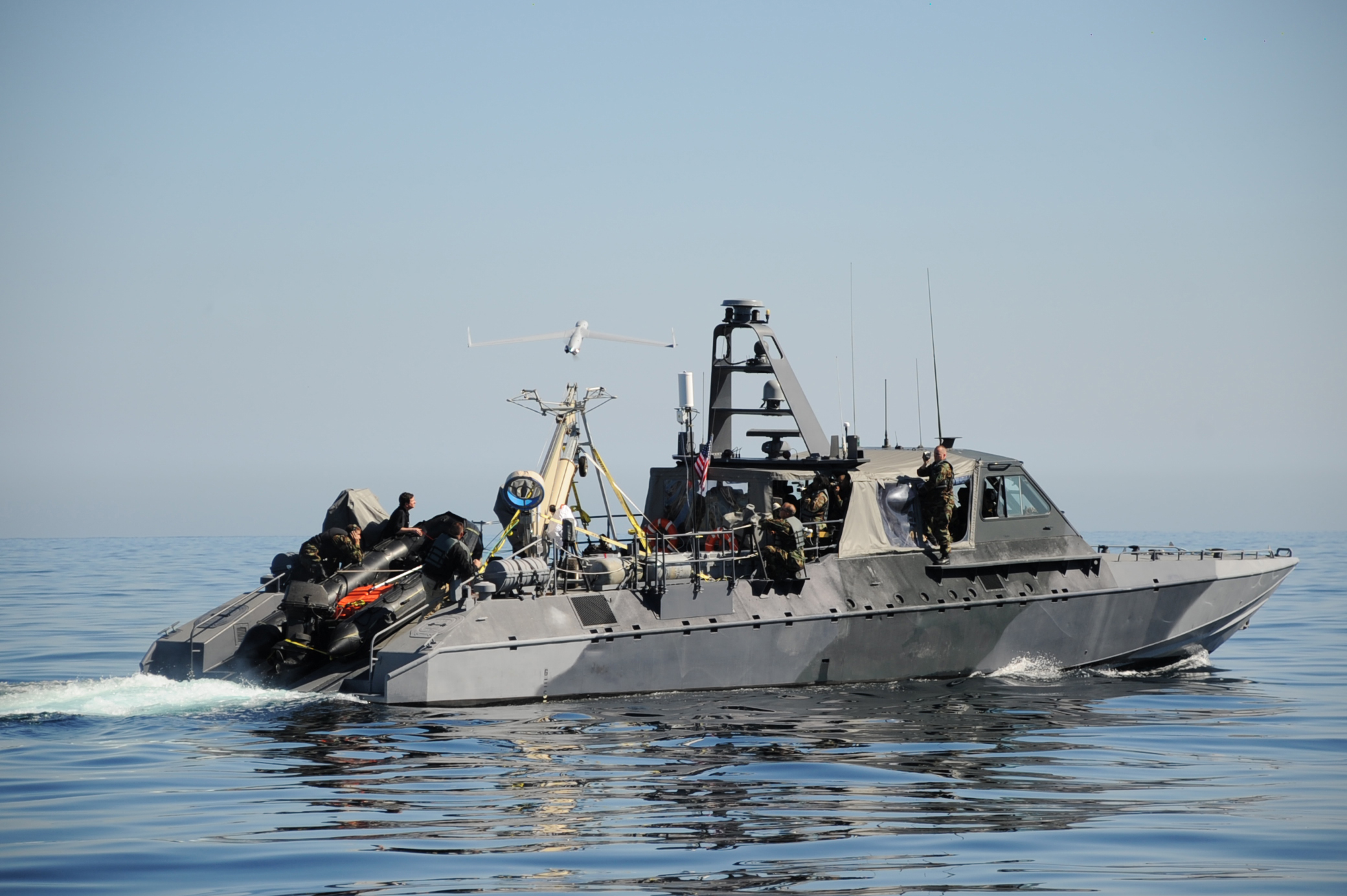
A Mark V Special Operations Craft launching a ScanEagle UAV

The company's defense products division is known as "Hodgdon Defense Composites". On January 11, 2008 Hodgdon and the U.S. Navy unveiled an experimental version of the Mark V Special Operations Craft, designated the Mk V.1, designed to reduce the number of injuries sustained by sailors and SEALs during the operation of the aluminum version of the vessel. Nicknamed the MAKO, the vessel was developed by a subsidiary of Hodgdon Shipbuilding, in collaboration with the University of Maine's Advanced Engineered Wood Composites Center. It features a hull made of layers of carbon fiber, a foam core and an outer layer of Kevlar for additional strength. It was constructed and launched at the Hodgdon Yachts East Boothbay facility. The MAKO is lighter than the current Mk V. The Office of Naval Research funded the prototype "to compare the properties of composite construction with aluminum" versions of the same craft.

In 2012, the Hodgdon Defense Composites division received several military contracts to produce rescue boats that resemble personal water craft, small enough to be air-dropped from a C-130 military cargo plane, yet able to penetrate rough surf. The 12-foot vessel is called the Greenough Advanced Rescue Craft (GARC) and employs a 143-horsepower engine, driving a pump-jet. Such craft reportedly have a range of up to 150 miles (240 km) at 50 miles per hour (80 km/h) and can carry four people. The craft was developed for the United States Air Force Special Operations Command.
