= USS Brambling (AMc-39) =

Minesweeper of the United States Navy

History

United States
- Name: Brambling
- Laid down: 4 February 1941
- Launched: 7 August 1941
- Acquired: 6 July 1941
- Commissioned: 15 October 1941
- Decommissioned: 16 May 1942
- In service: 16 May 1942
- Out of service: 12 February 1946
- Stricken: 26 February 1946
- Fate: Sold, 23 October 1947

General characteristics
- Class & type: Accentor-class coastal minesweeper
- Displacement: 205 tons
- Length: 97 ft 5 in (29.69 m)
- Beam: 22 ft 5 in (6.83 m)
- Draft: 8 ft 11 in (2.72 m)
- Speed: 10 knots (19 km/h; 12 mph)
- Complement: 17
- Armament: two .50 cal (12.7 mm) machine guns

USS Brambling (AMc-39) was an Accentor-class coastal minesweeper acquired by the U.S. Navy for the task of removing naval mines laid in the water to prevent ships from passing.

The first ship named Brambling by the Navy, AMc-39 was laid down on 4 February 1941 at Ipswich, Massachusetts, by W. A. Robinson, Inc.; launched on 7 August 1941; sponsored by Mrs. John McLennon; delivered to the Navy on 6 July 1941; modified for naval service and outfitted by the Boston Navy Yard; and commissioned there on 15 October 1941.

== World War II service ==
On 27 October, the coastal minesweeper departed Boston, Massachusetts, on her way to Yorktown, Virginia. She arrived at her destination on the 30th and conducted training out of the Mine Warfare School. At the conclusion of her training, she reported to the Commander in Chief, Atlantic Fleet, for duty. She was assigned initially to Submarine Squadron (SubRon) 1 at New London, Connecticut, where she began duty late in November. About a month later, Brambling was reassigned to the 3d Naval District and began patrol and minesweeping operations from the Montauk Section Base.

=== Assigned to the Caribbean ===
After repairs at the New York Marine Basin early in March 1942, the minesweeper sailed on 15 March bound for duty in the Panama Canal Zone. Voyaging via Norfolk, Virginia, Charleston, South Carolina, Miami, Florida, and Guantanamo Bay, Cuba, Brambling reported to the Commandant, 15th Naval District, at Coco Solo in the Canal Zone on 9 April. On 16 May 1942, Brambling was placed out of commission and then was placed in service as a district craft. The minesweeper spent the remainder of World War II patrolling the waters of the 15th Naval District.

== End-of-war deactivation ==
In October 1945, she received orders to Charleston for inactivation. She reported to the Commandant, 6th Naval District, on 22 October. Brambling was finally placed out of service on 12 February 1946, and she was laid up in the Wando River with the Charleston Group of the Atlantic Reserve Fleet. Her name was struck from the Navy list on 26 February 1946. On 23 October 1947, the former coastal minesweeper was sold to Evald Sooter, of Miami, Florida.
