= USS Governor =

Minesweeper of the United States Navy

History

United States
- Laid down: 4 May 1941
- Launched: 26 July 1941
- In service: 29 January 1942
- Out of service: 11 April 1947
- Stricken: date unknown
- Fate: Sold to a private purchaser

General characteristics
- Displacement: 195 tons
- Length: 97 ft 1 in (29.59 m)
- Beam: 22 ft (6.7 m)
- Draft: 9 ft (2.7 m)
- Speed: 10 knots (19 km/h)
- Complement: 17
- Armament: two machine guns

USS Governor (AMc-82) was an Accentor-class coastal minesweeper acquired by the U.S. Navy for the dangerous task of removing mines from minefields laid in the water to prevent ships from passing.

Governor a wooden-hulled coastal minesweeper was launched by Camden Shipbuilding & Marine Railway Co., Camden, Maine,on 26 July 1941; sponsored by Mrs. Richard Lyman; and placed in service on 29 January 1942 at Boston Navy Yard.

== World War II service ==
After briefly acting as an escort vessel in Massachusetts Bay, Governor sailed on 8 March 1942 for Yorktown, Virginia, where she conducted shakedown training with the Mine Warfare School. She was assigned briefly to the 7th Naval District,on 11 November 1942 attached to the 8th Naval District for her wartime duty. Governor arrived at Naval Section Base, Burrwood, Louisiana, on 29 December 1942, and remained there conducting minesweeping operations until August 1945.

== Placed out of service ==
After a brief tour during that month with Mine Countermeasures Station, Panama City, Florida, Governor was placed out of service and transferred to the Maritime Commission for disposal 11 April 1947. She was subsequently sold to a private purchaser.
