= USS Sparrow =

Several ships of the United States Navy have been named USS Sparrow:

- USS Sparrow (AMc-31), a coastal minesweeper acquired in 1940.
- USS Sparrow II (SP-3231) was a patrol vessel in commission from 1918 to 1919
- USS Sparrow (MHC 42), a coastal minehunter
