= USS Ostrich (AMc-51) =

Minesweeper of the United States Navy

History

United States
- Name: Ostrich
- Laid down: 6 February 1941
- Launched: 29 March 1941
- In service: 14 July 1941
- Out of service: 27 December 1945
- Stricken: 21 January 1946
- Fate: Unknown

General characteristics
- Class & type: Accentor-class minesweeper
- Displacement: 213 tons
- Length: 97 ft 1 in (29.59 m)
- Beam: 22 ft (6.7 m)
- Draft: 8 ft 6 in (2.59 m)
- Speed: 10 knots (19 km/h; 12 mph)
- Complement: 7
- Armament: 2 × .30 cal (7.62 mm) machine guns

USS Ostrich (AMc-51) was an Accentor-class minesweeper acquired by the U.S. Navy.

It was the second ship to be named Ostrich by the Navy, and was laid down 6 February 1941, by the Herreschoff Mfr. Co. Bristol, Rhode Island; launched 29 March 1941 and placed in service 14 July 1941.

== World War II service ==
After completion of fitting out, Ostrich departed Boston, Massachusetts, 29 July and sailed for Hampton Roads, Virginia, where she arrived 31 July and reported to Commandant, 5th Naval District for type training at Yorktown, Virginia.

=== Operating out of New Orleans ===
She was then attached to an Inshore Patrol Squadron and remained in this capacity until late November, when in company with USS Courlan (AMc-44) and USS Develin (AMc-45), she sailed to New Orleans, Louisiana, arriving 5 December and reporting to Commandant 8th Naval District. She operated out of New Orleans for the remainder of the war and until placed out of service on 27 December 1945 at Norfolk, Virginia.

== Deactivation ==
She was struck from the Naval Vessel Register 21 January 1946 and transferred to the Maritime Commission on 21 March 1947 for disposal.
