= USS Summit =

Minesweeper of the United States Navy

History

United States
- Laid down: 24 March 1941
- Launched: 20 September 1941
- Commissioned: 29 January 1942
- Decommissioned: 28 May 1946
- Stricken: 29 October 1946
- Fate: fate unknown

General characteristics
- Displacement: 195 tons
- Length: 98 ft 5 in (30.00 m)
- Beam: 23 ft 6 in (7.16 m)
- Draught: 10 ft 8 in (3.25 m)
- Speed: 10 knots
- Complement: 17
- Armament: two .50 cal (12.7 mm) machine guns., two .30 cal. machine guns

USS Summit (AMc-106) was an Accentor-class coastal minesweeper acquired by the U.S. Navy for the dangerous task of removing mines from minefields laid in the water to prevent ships from passing.

Summit was laid down on 24 March 1941 by the Snow Shipyards Co., Rockland, Maine; launched on 20 September 1941; sponsored by Miss Louise Dey; and commissioned on 29 January 1942.

== World War II service ==
Summit proceeded to Yorktown, Virginia, with USS Stalwart (AMc-105) for a 10-day training period with the Mine Warfare School. They arrived on 25 February and, upon completion of training, were routed onward to Key West, Florida, for duty in the 7th Naval District. Summit arrived there on 16 March 1942 and served that district until June 1945.

== Assigned as IX-232 ==
Summit was reassigned to the Naval Auxiliary Air Station, Mayport, Florida, on 30 June. Her minesweeping equipment was removed, and she was detailed to duty in connection with aviation duty as a target towing ship. Her designation was changed from AMc-106 to IX-232 on 10 August. In November, she was ordered to the Naval Air Station, Pensacola, Florida, and reported there, on 13 December 1945, for duty with the Naval Air Training Command.

== Post-war decommissioning ==
Summit was found to be in excess of Naval requirements in May 1946 and was decommissioned on 28 May. She was struck from the Navy list on 29 October 1946.
