= USS Ideal =

Minesweeper of the United States Navy

History

United States
- Laid down: 4 June 1941
- Launched: 20 September 1941
- In service: 24 April 1942
- Out of service: 10 June 1946
- Stricken: date unknown
- Fate: turned over to the Maritime Commission 28 December 1946

General characteristics
- Displacement: 195 tons
- Length: 97 ft 1 in (29.59 m)
- Beam: 22 ft (6.7 m)
- Draft: 9 ft 1 in (2.77 m)
- Speed: 10 knots
- Complement: 17

USS Ideal (AMc-85) was an Accentor-class coastal minesweeper acquired by the U.S. Navy for the dangerous task of removing mines from minefields laid in the water to prevent ships from passing.

Ideal, a wooden-hulled coastal minesweeper, was laid down 4 June 1941 by Warren Boat Yard, Inc., Warren, Rhode Island, launched 20 September 1941; sponsored by Miss Edith C. Alder; and placed in service at Boston, Massachusetts, 24 April 1942.

== World War II service ==
After shakedown out of Boston, Ideal reported to Mine Warfare School, Yorktown, Virginia, 11 May 1942. The ship served subsequently in the 8th Naval District at Burrwood, Louisiana, and in the 5th Naval District as a mine warfare training ship.

== Post-war decommissioning ==
She returned to Norfolk, Virginia, 26 May 1946 and decommissioned there 10 June 1946. Ideal was turned over to the Maritime Commission 28 December 1946.
