= USS Bulwark =

USS Bulwark is a name used more than once by the U.S. Navy:

- USS Bulwark (AMc-66), renamed Avenge on 23 May 1941
- USS Bulwark (AMc-68), a coastal minesweeper, laid down on 15 April 1941
- USS Bulwark (AM-425), a minesweeper, laid down on 12 December 1951
