= USS Guide (AMc-83) =

Minesweeper of the United States Navy

History

United States
- Laid down: 9 May 1941
- Launched: 20 September 1941
- Commissioned: 17 March 1942
- Decommissioned: 12 June 1946
- Stricken: 3 July 1946
- Fate: Sold to a private purchaser, 11 April 1947

General characteristics
- Displacement: 195 tons
- Length: 97 ft 1 in (29.59 m)
- Beam: 22 ft (6.7 m)
- Draft: 9 ft (2.7 m)
- Speed: 10 knots (19 km/h)
- Complement: 17
- Armament: two machine guns

USS Guide (AMc-83) was an Accentor-class coastal minesweeper acquired by the U.S. Navy for the dangerous task of removing mines from minefields laid in the water to prevent ships from passing.

Guide was launched 20 September 1941 by the Camden Shipbuilding & Marine Railway Co., Camden, Maine.

== World War II service ==
Guide trained from the Mine Warfare School at Yorktown, Virginia, until 17 April 1942 when she sailed to alternately sweep the main shipping channels leading out of Key West, Florida, New Orleans, Louisiana, and Mobile, Alabama. She periodically made brief visits to Pensacola, Florida, for special sweeping duties.

Her homeport changed from Mobile to Naval Station, Burrwood, Louisiana, in July 1944. She continued sweeping the approaches to New Orleans, Louisiana, and Mobile until July 1945. She then served the Mine Countermeasures Station at Panama City, Florida, for the remainder of her career.

== Post war inactivation and disposal ==
Guide was placed out of service 12 June 1946 and her name was struck from the Navy List 3 July. She was sold to a private purchaser 11 April 1947.
