= USS Paramount =

Minesweeper of the United States Navy

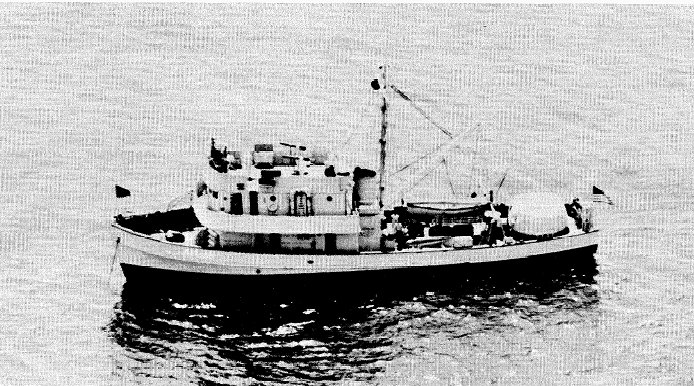
- USS Accentor, a sister ship of Paramount

History

United States
- Laid down: 14 April 1941
- Launched: 9 August 1941
- In service: 31 December 1941
- Out of service: 8 February 1946
- Stricken: 26 February 1946
- Fate: Transferred to the Maritime Commission for disposal on 16 September 1946

General characteristics
- Displacement: 196 tons
- Length: 97 ft 6 in (29.72 m)
- Beam: 22 ft 3 in (6.78 m)
- Draught: 9 ft 4 in (2.84 m)
- Speed: 10 knots
- Complement: 17
- Armament: two .50 cal (12.7 mm) machine guns

USS Paramount (AMc-92) was an Accentor-class coastal minesweeper acquired by the U.S. Navy for the dangerous task of removing mines from minefields laid in the water to prevent ships from passing.

== Construction ==
Paramount was laid down 14 April 1941 by the Delaware Bay SB Co., Inc. Leesburg, New Jersey; launched 9 August 1941; and placed in service 31 December 1941.

== World War II service ==
Paramount spent her entire Naval career participating in exercises and making voyages along the Atlantic Coast of the Southern U.S. and in the Caribbean. Involved in a grounding at the entrance to Ocracoke Inlet on 19 February 1942, she was towed to Morehead City, North Carolina by USCGC Dione, in sinking condition, for repairs. Placed out of service on 8 February 1946, Paramount was struck from the Naval Vessel Register on 26 February and transferred to the Maritime Commission for disposal on 16 September.
