= USS Vigor (AMc-110) =

Minesweeper of the United States Navy

History

United States
- Laid down: 6 August 1941
- Launched: 19 January 1942
- In service: 4 May 1942
- Out of service: 31 October 1945
- Stricken: 16 November 1945
- Fate: Sold on 13 November 1946

General characteristics
- Displacement: 195 tons
- Length: 98 ft 5 in (30.00 m)
- Beam: 23 ft 6 in (7.16 m)
- Draught: 10 ft 6 in (3.20 m) (max.)
- Speed: 10.0 knots
- Complement: 17
- Armament: two .50 cal (12.7 mm) machine guns

USS Vigor (AMc-110) was an Accentor-class coastal minesweeper acquired by the U.S. Navy for the dangerous task of removing mines from minefields laid in the water to prevent ships from passing.

Vigor, a wooden-hulled, coastal minesweeper, was laid down on 6 August 1941 at Rockland, Maine, by the Snow Shipyard, Inc.; launched on 19 January 1942; sponsored by Mrs. Lawrence Carver; and placed in service at the Boston Navy Yard on 4 May 1942.

== World War II service ==
Following fitting out, Vigor departed Boston, Massachusetts, on 6 May and headed for the Virginia Capes. Proceeding via Tompkinsville, New York, the coastal minesweeper arrived at Yorktown, Virginia, on 20 May for training at the Mine Warfare School. Upon completion of her exercises in the Tidewater area, Vigor operated off the eastern seaboard between Newport, Rhode Island, and Norfolk, Virginia. -- with her home yard at New York City—for the remainder of the Atlantic war. Sailing from Norfolk, bound for Charleston, South Carolina, the warship arrived at the latter port on 8 August 1945.

Subsequently, placed out of service at Charleston on 31 October 1945 and laid up in reserve in the Wando River, Vigor was declared surplus and made available for disposal by the Maritime Commission's War Shipping Administration. Struck from the Navy list on 16 November 1945, the erstwhile minecraft was sold on 13 November 1946.
