= USS Victor (AMc-109) =

Minesweeper of the United States Navy

History

United States
- Name: Victor
- Laid down: 14 July 1941
- Launched: 6 December 1941
- In service: 17 April 1942
- Out of service: 31 October 1945
- Stricken: 16 November 1945
- Fate: Sold, 28 October 1946

General characteristics
- Class & type: Accentor-class coastal minesweeper
- Displacement: 190 tons
- Length: 98 ft 5 in (30.00 m)
- Beam: 23 ft 6 in (7.16 m)
- Draft: 10 ft 6 in (3.20 m) (mean)
- Speed: 10 knots (19 km/h; 12 mph)
- Complement: 17
- Armament: two .50 cal (12.7 mm) machine guns., two .30 cal (7.62 mm) machine guns

USS Victor (AMc-109) was an Accentor-class coastal minesweeper acquired by the U.S. Navy for the task of removing naval mines laid in the water to prevent ships from passing.

Victor, a wooden-hulled coastal minesweeper, was laid down on 14 July 1941 at Rockland, Maine, by the Snow Shipyard, Inc.; launched on 6 December 1941; sponsored by Miss Virginia Hanson; and placed in service at the Boston Navy Yard on 17 April 1942.

== World War II service ==
Following training at the Mine Warfare School Yorktown, Virginia, Victor operated locally in the Tidewater region for nearly one year before shifting to the 3d Naval District in March 1943 for local operations. After the end of the war with Germany, she moved to Charleston, South Carolina, in June 1945 for mine clearance operations. Victor worked locally in the 6th Naval District until placed out of service there on 31 October 1945.

Simultaneously laid up in reserve in the Wando River, the minesweeper was declared surplus and authorized for delivery to the War Shipping Administration (WSA) on 5 November for disposal. Struck from the Navy list on 16 November 1945, the erstwhile minecraft was delivered at Charleston by the WSA to her purchaser, Eugene Mario of Gloucester, Massachusetts, on 28 October 1946.
