= USS Affray (AMc-112) =

Minesweeper of the United States Navy

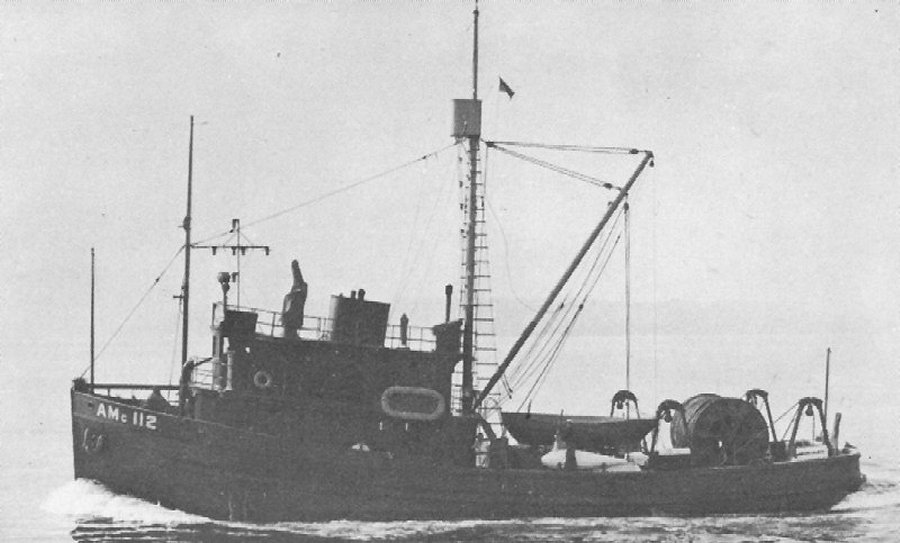
- USS Affray (AMc-112) on 4 June 1942

History

United States
- Name: Affray
- Acquired: 1941
- In service: 2 December 1941
- Out of service: 10 December 1945
- Stricken: 3 January 1946
- Fate: Sold back to her former owners

General characteristics
- Class & type: Accentor-class minesweeper
- Displacement: 205 tons
- Length: 89 ft 6 in (27.28 m)
- Beam: 24 ft 4 in (7.42 m)
- Draft: 10 ft 9 in (3.28 m)
- Propulsion: One 275 bhp (205 kW) Atlas 6HM-1558 diesel engine, one shaft
- Speed: 10.0 knots (18.5 km/h; 11.5 mph)
- Complement: 17
- Armament: 2 × 50 cal. machine guns

USS Affray (AMc-112) was an Accentor-class minesweeper acquired by the United States Navy for the dangerous task of removing mines from minefields laid in the water to prevent ships from passing.

Affray – a wooden-hulled, coastal minesweeper built in 1941 at Tacoma, Washington, by the Tacoma Boatbuilding Company – was acquired by the Navy late in 1941 and was placed in service on 2 December 1941.

== World War II service ==
Though she may have performed some duty at Seattle, Washington, initially Affray spent the bulk of her active career at Kodiak, Alaska. Her war diary does not begin until 1 July 1942, and, by that time, the warship was already at Kodiak conducting sweeps for mines and making other patrols on a daily basis. She remained so occupied throughout World War II.

== Post-war deactivation ==
Affray returned to Seattle in mid-October 1945 and began preparations for inactivation. She was placed out of service on 10 December 1945 and her name was struck from the Navy list on 3 January 1946. On 23 March 1946, she was sold back to her former owners.
