= USS Cotinga (AMc-43) =

Minesweeper of the United States Navy

History

United States
- Name: USS Cotinga
- Builder: Gibbs Gas Engine Co.
- Launched: 25 March 1941
- Commissioned: 14 June 1941
- Decommissioned: 13 December 1945
- Stricken: 21 August 1947
- Fate: Transferred to the Maritime Administration for disposal, 21 August 1947

General characteristics
- Class & type: Accentor-class minesweeper
- Displacement: 200 long tons (203 t)
- Length: 97 ft 1 in (29.59 m)
- Beam: 21 ft 8 in (6.60 m)
- Draft: 11 ft (3.4 m)
- Speed: 10 knots (19 km/h; 12 mph)

USS Cotinga (AMc-43), a U.S. Navy Accentor-class coastal minesweeper built for the U.S. Navy for service in World War II, was named after the cotinga, a passerine bird of South America and Central America.

Cotinga was launched 25 March 1941 by Gibbs Gas Engine Co., Jacksonville, Florida, and commissioned 14 June 1941 at Norfolk, Virginia.

== World War II East Coast operations ==
From 7 July to 26 August 1941 Cotinga conducted minesweeping exercises in the vicinity of Solomons Island, Maryland. Sailing for Argentia, Newfoundland, she was diverted into Casco Bay, Maine, where she conducted minesweeping operations through 7 December 1941. Assigned first to the Inshore Patrol, 1st Naval District, then to Service Squadron 5, Atlantic Fleet, she continued minesweeping operations and patrol duty in the bay until mid-1944. On 14 June 1944 she sailed to Cuban waters and was based at Guantanamo Bay for a year, where her services included target tow, drills and exercises, target for air groups, and escort for submarines.

On 12 June 1945 she was attached to the 6th Naval District and thereafter engaged infrequently in sweeping operations between Charleston, South Carolina, and Jacksonville, Florida.

== Decommissioning ==
Cotinga was decommissioned at Charleston on 13 December 1945 and transferred to the Maritime Administration for disposal on 21 August 1947.
