= USS Defiance (AMc-73) =

Minesweeper of the United States Navy

History

United States
- Laid down: 10 April 1941
- Launched: 21 June 1941
- In service: 24 November 1941
- Out of service: 1945
- Stricken: 1946
- Fate: fate unknown

General characteristics
- Displacement: 195 tons
- Length: 97 ft 1 in (29.59 m)
- Beam: 22 ft 0 in (6.71 m)
- Draught: 8.5 ft (2.6 m) (mean) (f.)
- Speed: 10.0 knots (19 km/h)
- Complement: 17
- Armament: two .50 cal (12.7 mm) machine guns

USS Defiance (AMc-73) was an Accentor-class coastal minesweeper acquired by the U.S. Navy for the dangerous task of removing mines from minefields laid in the water to prevent ships from passing.

== World War II service ==
Defiance was launched in June 1941 and was placed "in service", during 1941-45 and attached to the 10th Naval District.

== Post-war inactivation ==
She was struck in 1946.
