= USS Fortitude (AMc-81) =

Minesweeper of the United States Navy

History

United States
- Laid down: 14 August 1941
- Launched: 2 December 1941
- Commissioned: 20 April 1942
- Decommissioned: 1947
- Stricken: c1947
- Fate: Sold 31 January 1950

General characteristics
- Displacement: 275 tons
- Length: 98 ft 5 in (30.00 m)
- Beam: 23 ft 7 in (7.19 m)
- Draft: 10 ft 8 in (3.25 m)
- Speed: 10.0 knots
- Complement: 17
- Armament: two .30 cal (7.62 mm) machine guns

USS Fortitude (AMc-81) was an Accentor-class coastal minesweeper acquired by the U.S. Navy for the task of removing mines from minefields laid in the water to prevent ships from passing.

== World War II service ==
Fortitude was constructed as an Accentor-class coastal minesweeper just prior to World War II. She was assigned as USS Fortitude (AMc-81) on 17 May 1941.

=== Reclassified as a dive tender ===
However, on 20 April 1942, prior to completion as a coastal minesweeper, she was reclassified USS YDT-2, a dive tender, and the name "Fortitude" was canceled.

== Deactivation ==
Sold 31 January 1950
