= USS Trident =

Minesweeper of the United States Navy

History

United States
- Name: Trident
- Laid down: 25 April 1941
- Launched: 8 October 1941
- In service: 18 February 1942
- Out of service: 16 November 1945
- Stricken: 28 November 1945
- Fate: Sold, private sale, New York City

General characteristics
- Class & type: Accentor-class minesweeper
- Displacement: 195 tons
- Length: 98 ft 5 in (30.00 m)
- Beam: 23 ft 6 in (7.16 m)
- Draught: 10 ft 8 in (3.25 m)
- Speed: 10 knots (19 km/h; 12 mph)
- Complement: 17
- Armament: 2 × .50 cal (12.7 mm) machine guns

USS Trident (AMc-107) was an Accentor-class coastal minesweeper of the U.S. Navy.

Trident was laid down on 25 April 1941 at Rockland, Maine, by Snow Shipyards; launched on 8 October 1941; and placed in service at Boston, Massachusetts, on 18 February 1942.

== World War II service ==
Following a training period at the Mine Warfare School, Yorktown, Virginia, Trident reported to Section Base Boston, for duty with the 1st Naval District. During the first week in March 1942, the wooden-hulled coastal minesweeper plied the waters of Boston harbor and its approaches, performing tasks which would soon become familiar. At night, she functioned as a guard and escort vessel; then, as sunrise came, she began daily exploratory sweeps, searching for moored, magnetic, and sonic mines in the harbor and its approaches. At times, severe weather or low visibility forced Trident to secure from sweep operations; and, in foggy weather, she helped to regulate harbor traffic.

Continuing instruction, drills, and periods of repair broke the minesweeper's routine. After Trident was assigned to the harbor entrance control post, she had occasion to locate and investigate suspicious small craft—a welcome diversion from the usual inner harbor activities.

In June 1942, the 1st Naval District command was incorporated into the Northern Group of the Eastern Sea Frontier, and Trident continued her duties in coastal waters for over three years until 8 August 1945, when she arrived at Charleston, South Carolina, and reported to the Commandant, 6th Naval District, for disposition.

She was placed out of service on 16 November 1945 and her name was struck from the Navy list on the 28th. On 22 October 1946, Trident was transferred to the Maritime Commission; and she was subsequently sold to Benjamin Feldman of New York City.
