= USS Conqueror =

Minesweeper of the United States Navy

History

United States
- Laid down: 8 May 1941
- Launched: 20 August 1941
- In service: 6 March 1942
- Out of service: 6 December 1945
- Stricken: c1946
- Fate: Stricken 3 January 1946

General characteristics
- Displacement: 195 tons
- Length: 97 ft 1 in (29.59 m)
- Beam: 22 ft 0 in (6.71 m)
- Draft: 8.5 ft (2.6 m) (mean) (f.)
- Speed: 10.0 knots (19 km/h)
- Complement: 17
- Armament: two .50 cal (12.7 mm) machine guns

USS Conqueror (AMc-70) was an Accentor-class coastal minesweeper acquired by the U.S. Navy for the dangerous task of removing mines from minefields laid in the water to prevent ships from passing.

Conqueror was built by Warren Fish Company, Pensacola, Florida,

== World War II service ==
Conqueror was placed in service on 6 March 1942, and assigned successively to the 6th Naval District, the Caribbean Sea Frontier, and the 10th Naval District. Home Port in 1944-1945 was US Submarine base at St. Thomas V.I.

== Placed out of service ==
On 6 December 1945 she was placed out of service and delivered to the War Shipping Administration for disposal.
