= Exultant =

Exultant may refer to:

- Exultant (novel), a science-fiction novel
- USS Exultant (AM-441), an Aggressive-class minesweeper
- USS Exultant (AMc-79), an Accentor-class minesweeper
- Exultant (horse), 2019–2020 Hong Kong Horse of the Year
