= USS Bold (AMc-67) =

Minesweeper of the United States Navy

History

United States
- Name: USS Bold
- Builder: Bristol Yacht Building Co.
- Laid down: 27 August 1941
- Launched: 2 April 1942
- Acquired: 18 May 1942
- Commissioned: 27 May 1942
- Decommissioned: 27 December 1945
- Stricken: 21 January 1946
- Fate: Transferred to the Maritime Commission for disposal, 22 July 1946

General characteristics
- Class & type: Accentor-class minesweeper
- Displacement: 200 long tons (203 t)
- Length: 97 ft 1 in (29.59 m)
- Beam: 22 ft (6.7 m)
- Draft: 9 ft (2.7 m)
- Speed: 10 knots (19 km/h; 12 mph)
- Complement: 19
- Armament: 2 × .50 cal (12.7 mm) machine guns

USS Bold (AMc-67) was an Accentor-class minesweeper laid down on 27 August 1941 at South Bristol, Maine, by the Bristol Yacht Building Co.; launched on 2 April 1942; sponsored by Miss Ella E. Gamage; delivered to the U.S. Navy on 18 May 1942; fitted out at the Boston Navy Yard; and placed in service there on 27 May 1942.

== East Coast assignments ==
Bold sailed for Yorktown, Virginia, on 12 June and arrived there the following day. The coastal minesweeper reported to the Mine Warfare Training School and conducted two weeks of training there before being detached to proceed to the 6th Naval District. She operated locally out of Charleston, South Carolina, for the duration of World War II.

== Decommissioning ==
Bold was placed out of service on 27 December 1945 and berthed in the Wando River. Her name was struck from the Navy list on 21 January 1946. She was transferred to the Maritime Commission for disposal on 22 July 1946.
