= USS Dominant (AMc-76) =

Minesweeper of the United States Navy

History

United States
- Name: Dominant
- Laid down: 9 April 1941
- Launched: 6 June 1941
- Commissioned: 29 September 1941
- Decommissioned: 8 March 1942
- In service: 13 December 1943
- Out of service: 15 April 1946
- Stricken: 1 May 1946
- Fate: Transferred to the Maritime Commission for disposal on 5 September 1947

General characteristics
- Class & type: Accentor-class minesweeper
- Displacement: 283 tons
- Length: 96 ft (29 m)
- Beam: 21 ft (6.4 m)
- Draft: 9 ft (2.7 m)
- Speed: 11 knots (20 km/h; 13 mph)
- Complement: 17
- Armament: 2 × .30 cal (7.62 mm) machine guns

USS Dominant (AMc-76) was an Accentor-class minesweeper acquired by the U.S. Navy for the task of removing naval mines laid in the water to prevent ships from passing.

The wooden-hulled Dominant, a coastal minesweeper, was laid down 9 April 1941 by the Gibbs Gas Engine Co., Jacksonville, Florida, launched 6 June 1941 and commissioned at Charleston, South Carolina, on 29 September 1941.

== World War II service ==
After fitting out at Charleston, Dominant sailed to New London, Connecticut, and reported for duty to Commander, Submarine Force Atlantic, on 24 November 1941. After a restricted availability at the Boston Navy Yard in February 1942, the minesweeper returned to New London via Newport, Rhode Island, and decommissioned there on 8 March 1942.

== Second assignment ==
Assigned to Commander, Third Naval District, the minesweeper served in a non-commissioned status out of New London until reassigned to the Fifth Naval District on 13 December 1943 for use in mine warfare tests. She served in that duty until placed out of service at Norfolk on 15 April 1946.

== Inactivation ==
The minesweeper was stricken from the Navy List on 1 May 1946 and transferred to the Maritime Commission for disposal on 5 September 1947.
