= USS Tapacola =

Minesweeper of the United States Navy

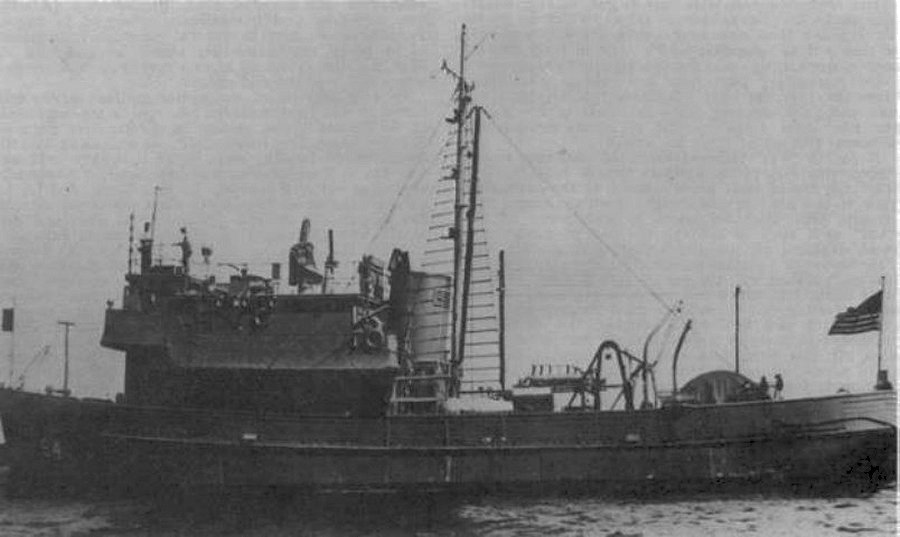

History

United States
- Laid down: 10 January 1941
- Launched: 3 July 1941
- Commissioned: 20 September 1941
- Decommissioned: 28 May 1946
- Stricken: 1946
- Fate: fate unknown

General characteristics
- Displacement: 275 tons
- Length: 98 ft 5 in (30.00 m)
- Beam: 23 ft 7 in (7.19 m)
- Draught: 10 ft 8 in (3.25 m)
- Speed: 10.0 knots
- Complement: 17
- Armament: two .30 cal (7.62 mm) machine guns

USS Tapacola (AMc-54) was an Accentor-class coastal minesweeper acquired by the U.S. Navy for the dangerous task of removing mines from minefields laid in the water to prevent ships from passing.

Tapacola was laid down on 10 January 1941 by Snow Shipyards, Rockland, Maine; launched on 3 July 1941; sponsored by Mrs. George T. Swiggum; and commissioned on 20 September 1941 at the Boston Navy Yard.

== World War II service ==
Tapacola departed Boston, Massachusetts, on 19 October for Yorktown, Virginia, where she held training at the Mine Warfare School before proceeding to Norfolk, Virginia. Upon her arrival there, on 30 October, she was directed to continue onward to Florida for duty with the 7th Naval District.

The minesweeper arrived at Key West, Florida, on 7 November 1941 and operated in waters off southern Florida until 30 June 1945 when she sailed to Mayport, Florida. Her minesweeping gear was removed, and Tapacola began towing targets in connection with aviation training at the air station.

== Redesignated IX-230 ==
On 10 August, her designation was changed to IX-230. She was transferred to the 8th Naval District and arrived at Pensacola, Florida, on 13 December 1945.

== Deactivation ==
On 28 May 1946, Tapacola was placed out of service and, the next month, declared “surplus to Navy needs". Tapacola was struck from the Navy list on 29 October 1946.
