= USS Limpkin (AMc-48) =

Minesweeper of the United States Navy

History

United States
- Name: Limpkin
- Namesake: limpkin
- Builder: Greenport Basin and Construction Company
- Laid down: 24 February 1941
- Launched: 5 April 1941
- Commissioned: 8 August 1941
- Decommissioned: 15 April 1946
- Stricken: 1 May 1946
- Identification: Hull number: AMc-48
- Fate: Sold in 1947

General characteristics
- Class & type: Accentor-class coastal minesweeper
- Displacement: 185 long tons (188 t)
- Length: 97 ft 1 in (29.6 m)
- Beam: 22 ft (6.7 m)
- Draft: 8 ft 6 in (2.6 m)
- Propulsion: one 400 bhp (300 kW) Cooper Bessemer G.N.-DR-6 diesel engine, one shaft
- Speed: 10 knots (19 km/h; 12 mph)
- Complement: 17
- Armament: 2 × .50 cal (12.7 mm) machine guns

USS Limpkin (AMc-48) was an Accentor-class coastal minesweeper acquired by the United States Navy for clearing coastal minefields. The vessel was launched on 5 April 1941 and entered service on 8 August. Limpkin operated off New York City and the mouth of the Chesapeake Bay during World War II. Following the war, the minesweeper was taken out of service on 15 April 1946 and sold to private interests and converted to a commercial trawler. The ship was renamed Hiawatha and then Blue Waters.

== Description ==
Limpkin was an Accentor-class coastal minesweeper designed for clearing coastal minefields from protector harbors. Constructed of wood, the ship had a displacement of 185 long tons (188 t). The minesweeper was 97 feet 1 inch (29.6 m) long, had a beam of 22 feet (6.7 m) and a draft of 8 feet 6 inches (2.6 m). Limpkin was powered by a Cooper Bessemer G.N.-DR-6 diesel engine turning one shaft rated at 400 brake horsepower (300 kW). This gave the vessel a maximum speed of 10 knots (19 km/h; 12 mph).

Limpkin was armed with two .50 cal (12.7 mm) machine guns and was equipped with minesweeping gear consisting of a heavy wire cable capable of extending to 150 fathoms (900 ft; 270 m) with cutting gear used to sever the mines from their anchors and allow them to surface to be exploded in a controlled manner there. The minesweeper had a complement of 17 officers and ratings.

== Service history ==
The first ship to be named Limpkin after the limpkin by the United States Navy, AMc-48 was laid down on 24 February 1941 by Greenport Basin and Construction Company, Long Island, New York. The ship was launched on 5 April 1941, sponsored by Miss Elsie Thornhill, and placed in service on 8 August 1941.

Following shakedown off Yorktown, Virginia, the new coastal minesweeper reported to the 3rd Naval District, New York City, on 9 August. After the United States entered World War II, Limpkin was among the coastal minesweepers responsible for keeping the crucial New York Harbor clear. For two years the ship swept the shipping channels of Manhattan, permitting large amounts of war material to be shipped to the European theater to support the Allied war effort.

Transferred to the 5th Naval District on 18 December 1943, Limpkin shifted homeport to Norfolk, Virginia. For the rest of the war, she operated at the mouth of the Chesapeake Bay.

Limpkin was placed out of service on 15 April 1946 and struck from the Navy list on 1 May 1946. She transferred to the Maritime Commission on 13 January 1947. Later in 1947 she was sold to W. E. Lewis, Inc., of Fleeton, Virginia, renamed Hiawatha, and placed in service as a commercial trawler. She was subsequently renamed Blue Waters.
