= USS Peerless (AMc-93) =

Minesweeper of the United States Navy

History

United States
- Laid down: 14 April 1941
- Launched: 9 August 1941
- In service: 19 February 1942
- Out of service: 18 March 1946
- Stricken: 28 March 1946
- Fate: Transferred to the War Department

General characteristics
- Displacement: 200 tons
- Length: 92 ft (28 m)
- Beam: 21 ft (6.4 m)
- Draught: 9 ft (2.7 m)
- Speed: 10 knots
- Complement: 17

USS Peerless (AMc-93) was an Accentor-class coastal minesweeper acquired by the U.S. Navy for the dangerous task of removing mines from minefields laid in the water to prevent ships from passing.

Peerless was laid down 14 April 1941 by Delaware Bay Shipbuilding Co., Leesburg, New Jersey, launched 9 August 1941 and was placed in service 19 February 1942.

== World War II service ==
The new coastal minesweeper got underway 19 March and trained in Chesapeake Bay out of Yorktown, Virginia. She departed Hampton Roads 12 April for Charleston and left that port for Cuba on the 18th, with USS Larch (AN-21). Arriving Guantanamo Bay, Cuba, 23 April, Peerless operated in the Caribbean throughout World War II performing minesweeping and inshore patrol duties. The minesweeper was placed out of service and transferred to the War Department at Norfolk, Virginia, 18 March 1946. Peerless was struck from the List of District Craft 28 March 1946.
