= USS Courier (AMc-72) =

Minesweeper of the United States Navy

History

United States
- Laid down: 31 March 1941
- Launched: 17 May 1941
- In service: 11 October 1941
- Out of service: c1946
- Stricken: c1946
- Fate: Sold

General characteristics
- Displacement: 195 tons
- Length: 97 ft 1 in (29.59 m)
- Beam: 22 ft 0 in (6.71 m)
- Draft: 8.5 ft (2.6 m) (mean) (f.)
- Speed: 10.0 knots (19 km/h)
- Complement: 17
- Armament: two .50 cal (12.7 mm) machine guns

USS Courier (AMc-72) was an Accentor-class coastal minesweeper acquired by the U.S. Navy for the dangerous task of removing mines from minefields laid in the water to prevent ships from passing.

== World War II service ==
Courier served in an "in service" status in the 1st Naval District from 1941 to 1946.

== Post-war inactivation ==
It was sold in 1946.
