= USS Bateleur =

Minesweeper of the United States Navy

History

United States
- Name: Bateleur
- Namesake: Bateleur
- Builder: W. A. Robinson, Inc., Ipswich, Massachusetts
- Laid down: 21 January 1941
- Launched: 12 May 1941
- In service: 18 August 1941
- Out of service: 15 November 1945
- Stricken: 28 November 1945
- Identification: Hull symbol: AMc-37; Code letters: NAVS
- Fate: Sold, 20 August 1947

General characteristics
- Class & type: Accentor-class minesweeper
- Displacement: 205 long tons (208 t)
- Length: 97 ft 5 in (29.69 m)
- Beam: 22 ft 5 in (6.83 m)
- Draft: 9 ft (2.7 m)
- Installed power: 1 × Cooper Bessemer G. N.-8-STB diesel engine; 400 bhp (300 kW)
- Propulsion: 1 × screws
- Speed: 10 kn (12 mph; 19 km/h)
- Complement: 17
- Armament: 2 × .3 in (7.6 mm) caliber machine guns

USS Bateleur (AMc-37) was an Accentor-class coastal minesweeper in the U.S. Navy. She was named after the bateleur, a short-tailed eagle common to eastern Africa.

Bateleur was laid down on 21 January 1941 at Ipswich, Massachusetts, by W. A. Robinson, Inc.; launched on 12 May 1941; sponsored by Mrs. Warren S. Little; fitted out for naval service by the Boston Navy Yard; and placed in service there on 18 August 1941.

== World War II East Coast operations ==
The coastal minesweeper departed Boston, Massachusetts on 30 August and shaped a course for the Chesapeake Bay. She arrived at Solomons Island, Maryland in Calvert County, Maryland, where the Patuxent River empties into Chesapeake Bay, on 2 September. After a week of degaussing experiments at Solomons Island, the ship moved south to Yorktown, Virginia, on 10 September and remained there until the beginning of October when she received orders to return to Boston. Bateleur reentered Boston on 4 October and began almost four years of service with the 1st Naval District Inshore Patrol. Operating primarily from the Newport, Rhode Island, section base, she patrolled the shoreline of the 1st Naval District until near the end of World War II.

== Deactivation ==
Late in July 1945, the coastal minesweeper received orders to proceed to Charleston, South Carolina, for inactivation and disposal. She arrived at the Naval Frontier Base, Charleston, on 8 August and was placed out of service there on 15 November 1945. She was placed in the Charleston Group, Atlantic Reserve Fleet, but her name was struck from the Navy list on 28 November 1945. On 20 August 1947, the Maritime Commission sold her to the Whaling City Dredge & Dock Corporation of Groton, Connecticut.
