= USS Reaper (AMc-96) =

Minesweeper of the United States Navy

History

United States
- Laid down: 1 June 1941
- Launched: 15 April 1942
- In service: 14 November 1942
- Out of service: 15 November 1945
- Stricken: 28 November 1945
- Fate: Sold 19 September 1946

General characteristics
- Displacement: 200 tons
- Length: 97 ft 1 in (29.59 m)
- Beam: 21 ft (6.4 m)
- Draught: 9 ft (2.7 m)
- Speed: 10 knots
- Complement: 17
- Armament: two 20 mm machine guns

USS Reaper (AMc-96) was an Accentor-class coastal minesweeper acquired by the U.S. Navy for the hazardous task of removing mines from minefields laid in the water to prevent ships from passing.

Reaper was laid down 1 June 1941 by Noank Shipbuilding Co., Noank, Connecticut, launched 15 April 1942; and placed in service 14 November 1942.

== World War II service ==
During World War II, Reaper conducted minesweeping patrols in the Caribbean, and operated out of San Juan, Puerto Rico. Placed out of service 15 November 1945, she was struck from the Navy list on the 28th and sold 19 September 1946 by the Maritime Commission at Charleston, South Carolina, to Harry Mogck of Cape May Boat Works, Cape May, New Jersey.
