= USS Assertive (AMc-65) =

Minesweeper of the United States Navy

History

United States
- Laid down: 5 April 1941
- Launched: 19 November 1941
- In service: 7 March 1942
- Out of service: 30 November 1945
- Stricken: 19 December 1945
- Fate: Sold to private buyer

General characteristics
- Displacement: 195 tons
- Length: 97 ft 1 in (29.59 m)
- Beam: 22 ft 0 in (6.71 m)
- Draught: 8½' (mean) (f.)
- Speed: 10.0 knots
- Complement: 19
- Armament: two .30 cal (7.62 mm) machine guns

USS Assertive (AMc-65) was an Accentor-class coastal minesweeper acquired by the U.S. Navy for the dangerous task of removing mines from minefields laid in the water to prevent ships from passing.

The still unnamed wooden-hulled coastal minesweeper AMc-65 was laid down on 5 April 1941 at South Bristol, Maine, by the Bristol Yacht Building Co.; named Avenge (AMc-65) on 17 May 1941; renamed Assertive on 23 May 1941 when the name Avenge was reassigned to AMc-66; launched on 19 November 1941; sponsored by Mrs. Harvey Gamage of Bristol, Maine, the wife of a partner in the Bristol Yacht Building Co.; delivered to the Navy at the Boston Navy Yard on 19 February 1942; and placed in service there on 7 March 1942.

== World War II service ==
Following shakedown training at the Mine Warfare School, Yorktown, Virginia, Assertive was assigned to the 3d Naval District and operated from New York for the duration of the war in Europe. In mid-June 1945, the minesweeper was shifted south to the 6th Naval District and operated out of Charleston, South Carolina, on sweeping duties until 7 July, when she returned to the 3d Naval District. Directed to proceed back to Charleston for disposition under the auspices of Commandant, 6th Naval District,

== Post-war deactivation ==
Assertive was placed out of service there on 30 November 1945, and her name was struck from the Navy Directory on 19 December 1945. Accepted by the Maritime Commission on 4 October 1946, the former minecraft was simultaneously delivered, at Charleston, to her purchaser, Mr. Joseph Giacalone of Boston.
