= USS Observer (AMc-91) =

American naval ship

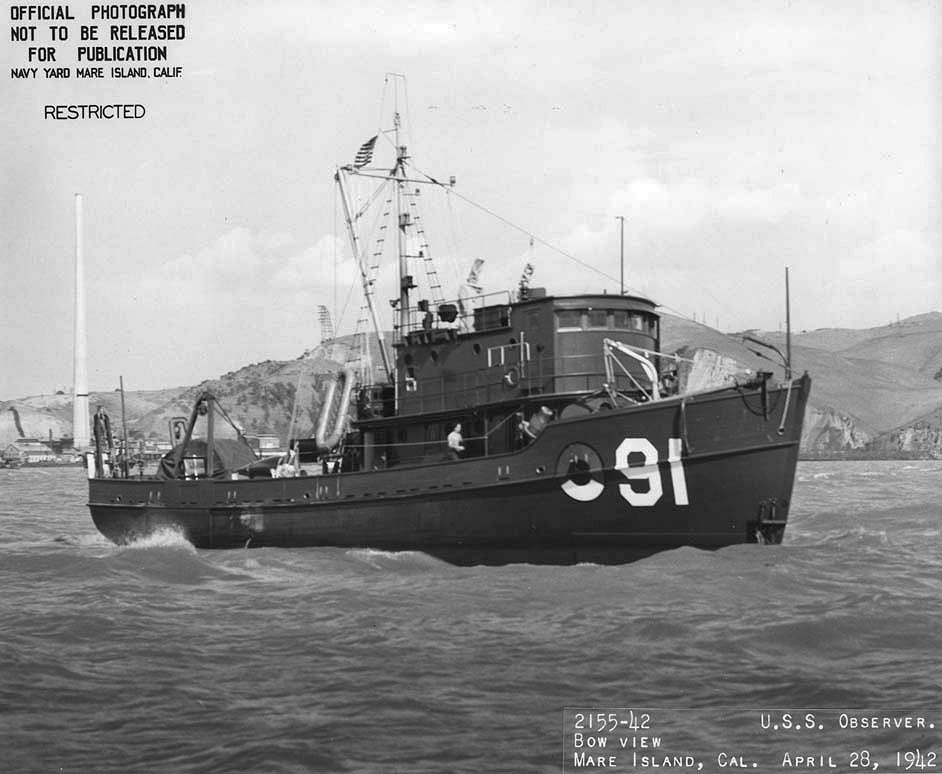

History

United States
- Laid down: 6 September 1941
- Launched: 15 January 1941
- In service: 14 April 1942
- Out of service: 10 December 1945
- Stricken: 8 May 1946
- Fate: Transferred to the Maritime Commission 21 August 1947

General characteristics
- Displacement: 228 tons
- Length: 97 ft 1 in (29.59 m)
- Beam: 22 ft (6.7 m)
- Draught: 9 ft 1 in (2.77 m)
- Speed: 10 knots
- Complement: 17
- Armament: two .50 cal (12.7 mm) machine guns

USS Observer (AMc-91) was an Accentor-class coastal minesweeper acquired by the U.S. Navy for the dangerous task of removing mines from minefields laid in the water to prevent ships from passing.

Observer was laid down 6 September 1941 by F. L. Fulton Co., Antioch, California, launched 15 January 1942 sponsored by Mrs. E. Stamm and placed in service 14 April 1942. Observer was assigned to the 12th Naval District and was homeported at San Francisco, California. She operated out of this port until taken out of service 10 December 1945. She was stricken 8 May 1946 and transferred to the Maritime Commission 21 August 1947.

In the 1950s she was purchased by the Krieger Family and used as the family's private yacht. Douglas Oil acquired her in the 1960s as part of the purchase of Krieger Oil. When Continental Oil (Conoco) was purchased by Dupont in 1981 (in a move to reduce debt) Dupont elected to divest themselves of the ship. It was subsequently purchased by an Alaskan charter company and refitted as a charter vessel that was pivotal in promoting legislation to protect the Tongass National Forest. They decided to refit another minesweeper that accommodated twice the passengers. The ship was purchased in 2003 by a Southeast Alaska small ship cruising company and sails under the name Sea Wolf.
