= USS Marabout =

Minesweeper of the United States Navy

History

United States
- Name: Marabout
- Laid down: 20 December 1940
- Launched: 17 February 1941
- Commissioned: 8 July 1941
- Decommissioned: 29 May 1946
- Stricken: c1946
- Fate: Sold to the City of Boston, 31 July for service as a fireboat

General characteristics
- Class & type: Accentor-class minesweeper
- Displacement: 173 tons
- Length: 97 ft 1 in (29.59 m)
- Beam: 22 ft (6.7 m)
- Draft: 8 ft 6 in (2.59 m)
- Speed: 10 knots (19 km/h; 12 mph)
- Complement: 17
- Armament: 2 × .50 cal (12.7 mm) machine guns

USS Marabout (AMc-50) was an Accentor-class minesweeper acquired by the U.S. Navy for the task of removing naval mines laid in the water to prevent ships from passing.

Marabout was laid down 20 December 1940 by the Herreshoff Mfg. Co., Bristol, Rhode Island; launched 17 February 1941; sponsored by Mrs. R. F. Haffenreffer; and commissioned 8 July 1941.

== World War II service ==
Following shakedown off the mid Atlantic seaboard, Marabout was assigned to the 1st Naval District at Boston, Massachusetts. On 9 December, two days after the United States entered World War II, she sailed for Bermuda to help combat German U-boats in the western Atlantic Ocean.

=== German subs plant mines on U.S. East Coast ===
In May 1942, the U-boats began laying mines off the Atlantic coasts. Starting 14 May at St. John's, Newfoundland, these activities threatened merchantmen as far as St. Lucia in the West Indies. Marabout, a coastal minesweeper, had the mission of ensuring safe passage to Allied shipping through the entrances of the ports.

=== Reassigned to the 5th Naval District ===
On 13 June, Marabout was assigned to the 5th Naval District, where mines laid by U-701, 12 June, sank a tanker, a trawler, and a coal barge; and damaged another tanker and destroyer USS Bainbridge (DD-246). Joining ServRon 5 in the fall, she supported units of the Fleet Operation Training Command, in particular task group TG 23.1, until ordered to New London, Connecticut, 7 November 1944, for duty under ComSubLant. There, for the next year and a half, she performed widely varied duties including radar jamming and sonar operations with other Naval and Coast Guard units in the area and at the Submarine School.

== Deactivation ==
On 16 May 1946, she steamed for Boston, where she decommissioned on 29 May. Transferred to the Maritime Commission for disposal, she was sold to the City of Boston, 31 July for service as a fireboat.
