= USS Turaco (AMc-55) =

History

United States
- Name: USS Turaco
- Builder: Snow Shipyards, Rockland, Maine
- Laid down: 17 January 1941
- Launched: 28 July 1941
- Commissioned: 9 October 1941
- Decommissioned: 30 November 1945
- Stricken: 19 December 1945
- Fate: Sold, 1947

General characteristics
- Class & type: Accentor-class minesweeper
- Displacement: 275 long tons (279 t)
- Length: 98 ft 5 in (30.00 m)
- Beam: 23 ft 7 in (7.19 m)
- Draft: 10 ft 9 in (3.28 m)
- Speed: 10 knots (19 km/h; 12 mph)
- Complement: 17
- Armament: 2 × .50 cal (12.7 mm) machine guns; 4 × .30 cal (7.62 mm) machine guns

USS Turaco (AMc-55), an [Accentor-class coastal minesweeper was named by the U.S. Navy after the turaco. The ship was laid down on 17 January 1941 by the Snow Shipyards of Rockland, Maine, launched on 28 July 1941, and was decommissioned on 30 November 1945.

== World War II North Atlantic operations ==
The new coastal minesweeper completed fitting out at Boston Naval Shipyard; then got underway on 19 October 1941. She arrived at Yorktown, Virginia, on the 21st for a period of training in mine warfare. In October, the wooden-hulled coastal minesweeper arrived at Norfolk, Virginia, and, soon thereafter, headed southward. Early in November, she reported for duty to the Commandant, 7th Naval District.

On 19 February 1942, a German submarine torpedoed and sank SS Pan Massachusetts, the first American ship lost to enemy action in the waters of the Gulf Sea Frontier. In mid 1942, as German submarines took their toll of merchant shipping, Turaco pursued her duties. German submarines laid minefields which were discovered by patrolling American vessels - often enough, only after American ships had been damaged or lost. The small coastal minesweepers joined the larger sweepers (AM's) in clearing these fields on the Eastern Sea Frontier and Gulf Sea Frontier. As the war wore on, Turaco continued her duties with the 6th Naval District and the 7th Naval District. Increased availability of ships and aircraft, improved understanding of antisubmarine warfare, and greater organizational efficiency all contributed to decreasing merchant ship losses on the Gulf Sea Frontier.

== Post-War operations ==
As World War II drew to its close in June 1945, Turaco served with Naval Air Operational Training Commands at Mayport, Florida, and Fort Lauderdale, Florida. Following a brief assignment in July with the Bureau of Ordnance, 7th Naval District, the minesweeper proceeded to Miami, Florida, for alterations. Early in August, as it became clear that the fighting would soon end, she reported to the Commandant, 6th Naval District, at Charleston for disposition.

== Decommissioning ==
Turaco was placed out of service on 30 November 1945 and was struck from the Navy list on 19 December of the same year. In September 1947, she was transferred to the Maritime Commission and was sold to Henry H. Berman, Newark, New Jersey.
