= USS Fearless (AMc-80) =

Minesweeper of the United States Navy

History

United States
- Laid down: 4 August 1941
- Launched: 18 November 1941
- Commissioned: 4 February 1942
- Decommissioned: date unknown
- Stricken: date unknown
- Fate: Sunk as a target in 1973

General characteristics
- Displacement: 275 tons
- Length: 98 ft 5 in (30.00 m)
- Beam: 23 ft 7 in (7.19 m)
- Draught: 10 ft 8 in (3.25 m)
- Speed: 10.0 knots
- Complement: 17
- Armament: two .30 cal (7.62 mm) machine guns

the second USS Fearless (AMc-80) was an Accentor-class coastal minesweeper acquired by the U.S. Navy.

== World War II service ==
No data available.

=== Reclassified as a dive tender ===
Fearless was reclassified YDT-5 on 15 February 1943.

== Deactivation ==
Fearless was sunk as a target in 1973.

The Fearless is in 80 feet of water lying on her keel 800 yards North of Great Harbour Peter Island in the British Virgin Islands.
