= USS Barbet (AMc-38) =

Minesweeper of the United States Navy

History

United States
- Name: Barbet
- Namesake: Barbet
- Builder: W. A. Robinson, Inc., Ipswich, Massachusetts
- Laid down: 31 January 1941
- Launched: 24 July 1941
- Commissioned: 29 September 1941
- Decommissioned: 16 May 1942
- In service: 16 May 1942
- Out of service: 8 February 1946
- Stricken: 26 February 1946
- Identification: Hull symbol:AMc-38; Code letters:NAQS
- Fate: Sold, 13 August 1947
- Notes: Converted to a merchant fisherman and retained the name Barbet

General characteristics
- Class & type: Accentor-class minesweeper
- Displacement: 221 long tons (225 t)
- Length: 97 ft 6 in (29.72 m)
- Beam: 22 ft 6 in (6.86 m)
- Draft: 8 ft 11 in (2.72 m)
- Installed power: 1 × Cooper Bessemer G. N.-8-STB diesel engine; 400 bhp (300 kW)
- Propulsion: 1 × screws
- Speed: 10 kn (12 mph; 19 km/h)
- Complement: 17
- Armament: 2 × .5 in (13 mm) caliber machine guns

USS Barbet (AMc-38) was an Accentor-class coastal minesweeper acquired by the U.S. Navy for the task of removing naval mines laid in the water to prevent ships from passing.

The first ship to be named Barbet by the Navy, AMc-38 was laid down on 31 January 1941 at Ipswich, Massachusetts, by W. A. Robinson, Inc.; launched on 24 July 1941; sponsored by Mrs. E. Robinson; and commissioned on 29 September 1941.

== World War II service ==
Barbet departed Boston, Massachusetts, on 4 October and arrived at the Naval Mine Warfare School, Yorktown, Virginia, on the 6th. From there, she moved to the Naval Operating Base, Norfolk, Virginia, for additional outfitting. On 4 December, the minesweeper was assigned to Mine Division (MinDiv) 27 and was based at the Section Base, New London, Connecticut.

=== War patrols ===
Following the attack on Pearl Harbor on 7 December, she began daily patrols along the New England coast. That assignment lasted until mid February 1942. On the 16th, she received word that she would be transferred to the Panama Canal Zone. First, however, Barbet had to undergo an availability at the Marine Basin Co., Gravesend, New York, to correct damage incurred in a collision with an Eagle boat at Newport, Rhode Island. The repairs were completed midway through March, and the coastal minesweeper departed Gravesend bound for the Canal Zone.

=== Caribbean operations ===
After stops at Charleston, South Carolina; Miami, Florida; and Guantanamo Bay, Cuba, she arrived in Coco Solo on 9 April 1942 and began operations with the Inshore Patrol, 15th Naval District.

=== Pacific Ocean operations ===
On 5 May, she transited the canal and joined the Pacific Section, Inshore Patrol. She conducted two ship minesweeping operations and patrolled the sea channels. On 16 May 1942, Barbet was decommissioned and placed "in service."

=== "In service" activity ===
Her duties, however, remained the same and continued throughout the remainder of World War II. Following the end of the war, Barbet was ordered to Charleston for disposal by the Commandant, 6th Naval District. The coastal minesweeper arrived in Charleston on 22 October 1945.

== Post-war deactivation ==
She was placed out of service at Charleston on 8 February 1946, and her name was struck from the Navy list on 26 February 1946. She was sold by the Maritime Commission at Washington, D.C., on 13 August 1947.
