= USS Chimango (AMc-42) =

Minesweeper of the United States Navy

History

United States
- Name: Chimango
- Namesake: Bird: Chimango
- Laid down: date unknown
- Launched: 8 March 1941
- Commissioned: 3 June 1941
- Decommissioned: 15 June 1942
- In service: 15 June 1942
- Out of service: 20 December 1945
- Stricken: date unknown
- Fate: Transferred to the Maritime Commission for disposal 21 August 1947

General characteristics
- Class & type: Accentor-class minesweeper
- Displacement: 205 tons
- Length: 97 ft 5 in (29.69 m)
- Beam: 22 ft 5 in (6.83 m)
- Draft: 8 ft 11 in (2.72 m)
- Speed: 10 knots (19 km/h; 12 mph)
- Complement: 17
- Armament: 2 × .50 cal (12.7 mm) machine guns

USS Chimango (AMc-42) was an Accentor-class minesweeper acquired by the U.S. Navy for the task of removing naval mines laid in the water to prevent ships from passing. The vessel was named after the chimango, a medium-sized South American bird of prey.

The first ship to be named Chimango by the Navy, AMC-42 was launched 8 March 1941 by Gibbs Gas Engine Co., Jacksonville, Florida, and commissioned 3 June 1941.

== World War II service ==
Chimango had training at Mine Warfare Base, Yorktown, Virginia, until 26 July 1941 when she rendezvoused with USS Goldfinch (AM-77) and USS Jacamar (AMc-47) to sail to Argentia, Newfoundland.

From 2 August she operated off this new base laying buoys, taking part in minesweeping exercises, and recovering gear in Placentia Bay, until 5 October when she sailed for Casco Bay, Maine, and sweeping operations and patrols along the Maine coast. She also received aboard daily armed guard parties from merchant ships for instruction.

=== Inservice activities ===
On 15 June 1942 she was decommissioned but placed in service, and continued to operate on minesweeping and patrol duty at New York and Charleston, South Carolina, until 20 December 1945.

== Deactivation ==
She was transferred to the Maritime Commission for disposal 21 August 1947.
