= USS Heroic =

Minesweeper of the United States Navy

History

United States
- Laid down: 5 May 1941
- Launched: 30 August 1941
- Commissioned: 25 March 1942
- Decommissioned: 18 December 1945
- Stricken: 8 January 1946
- Fate: Turned over to the Maritime Commission for disposal 28 September 1946

General characteristics
- Displacement: 195 tons
- Length: 97 ft 1 in (29.59 m)
- Beam: 22 ft (6.7 m)
- Draft: 9 ft 1 in (2.77 m)
- Speed: 10 knots (19 km/h)
- Complement: 17
- Armament: two .50 cal (12.7 mm) machine guns

USS Heroic (AMc-84) was an Accentor-class coastal minesweeper acquired by the U.S. Navy for the dangerous task of removing mines from minefields laid in the water to prevent ships from passing.

Heroic, a wooden-hull coastal minesweeper, was laid down on 5 May and launched on 30 August 1941 by Warren Boat Yard, Inc., Warren, Rhode Island.

== World War II service ==
Heroic reported to Mine Warfare School, Yorktown, Virginia, for intensive training 11 April 1942 and then proceeded to Bermuda for further training. She was assigned to patrol and minesweeping duty in the 5th Naval District and was based at Norfolk, Virginia, 20 July 1942 and served there throughout the remainder of the war.

== Post-war decommissioning ==
Heroic decommissioned at Portsmouth, Virginia, 18 December 1945 and was turned over to the Maritime Commission for disposal 28 September 1946.

== Post War career ==
Sold post war, she was converted into a fishing trawler. she was named Elizabeth B in 1948, reverting to Heroic later. On August 21, 1969 she caught fire and sank in the Atlantic Ocean 15 miles southeast of Gloucester, Massachusetts in 100 feet of water in the Stellwagen Bank National Marine Sanctuary ((42°24′N 70°27′W)). The captain and four crew members were picked up by West German fishing vessel Tiko I.
