= USS Skipper =

Minesweeper of the United States Navy

History

United States
- Laid down: 21 May 1941
- Launched: 16 January 1942
- In service: 29 May 1942
- Out of service: 1 February 1946
- Stricken: 25 February 1946
- Fate: Delivered to the Maritime Commission on 12 December 1946 for disposal and sale

General characteristics
- Displacement: 195 tons
- Length: 98 ft 5 in (30.00 m)
- Beam: 23 ft 6 in (7.16 m)
- Draught: 10 ft 8 in (3.25 m)
- Speed: 10.0 knots
- Complement: 17
- Armament: one .50 cal (12.7 mm) machine gun

USS Skipper (AMc-104) was an Accentor-class coastal minesweeper acquired by the U.S. Navy for the dangerous task of removing mines from minefields laid in the water to prevent ships from passing.

Skipper, a coastal minesweeper, was laid down on 21 May 1941 by H. G. Marr of Damariscotta, Maine; launched on 16 January 1942, sponsored by Miss Irene Jones, and placed in service on 29 May 1942.

== World War II service ==
Skipper completed fitting out at the Boston Navy Yard on 30 May. From there, she moved to the Mine Warfare School at Yorktown, Virginia, departing Boston, Massachusetts, on 12 June and arriving at Yorktown on 13 June. She was assigned to the school and the 5th Naval District for the duration of her Navy career, operating in the Chesapeake Bay along the shores of Maryland and Virginia.

Skipper was reported as excess to the needs of the Navy in January 1946 and placed out of service on 1 February. Her name was struck from the Navy list on 25 February and she was delivered to the Maritime Commission on 12 December 1946 for disposal. Skipper was subsequently sold.
