= USS Stalwart (AMc-105) =

Minesweeper of the United States Navy

History

United States
- Name: Stalwart
- Laid down: 24 March 1941
- Launched: 28 August 1941
- Commissioned: 22 January 1942
- Decommissioned: 2 August 1946
- Stricken: 13 December 1946
- Fate: unknown

General characteristics
- Class & type: Accentor-class minesweeper
- Displacement: 195 tons
- Length: 98 ft 5 in (30.00 m)
- Beam: 23 ft 6 in (7.16 m)
- Draught: 10 ft 8 in (3.25 m)
- Speed: 10 knots (19 km/h; 12 mph)
- Complement: 17
- Armament: 2 × .50 cal (12.7 mm). machine guns; 2 × .30 cal. machine guns

USS Stalwart (AMc-105) was an Accentor-class coastal minesweeper acquired by the U.S. Navy for the task of removing naval mines laid in the water to prevent ships from passing.

Stalwart was laid down on 24 March 1941 by Snow Shipyards Co., Rockland, Maine; launched on 28 August 1941, sponsored by Miss Van Meter Blackie; and commissioned on 22 January 1942.

== World War II service ==
Stalwart sailed to Yorktown, Virginia, where she began a 10-day training period, on 25 February, after which she was routed to Key West, Florida. She arrived there on 16 March and was assigned to the 7th Naval District for duty. The minesweeper served that district through the war years until 30 June 1945. She was then assigned to Mayport, Florida, in the 6th Naval District. Her minesweeping equipment was removed, and she was detailed duty as a target towing ship in connection with aircraft training at the Naval Auxiliary Air Station.

== Operating as IX-231 ==
The designation of Stalwart was changed from AMc-105 to IX-231 on 10 August 1945. She decommissioned on 2 August 1946 and was struck from the Navy list on 13 December 1946.
