= USS Endurance (AMc-77) =

Minesweeper of the United States Navy

History

United States
- Launched: 19 June 1941
- In service: 11 October 1941
- Out of service: 6 December 1945
- Fate: Transferred to the Maritime Administration on 7 July 1947 for disposal

General characteristics
- Displacement: 219 tons (f.)
- Length: 97 ft 6 in (29.72 m)
- Beam: 22 ft 3 in (6.78 m)
- Draught: 9 ft (2.7 m)
- Speed: 10 knots (19 km/h)
- Complement: 17
- Armament: two .50 cal (12.7 mm) machine guns

USS Endurance (AMc-77) was an Accentor-class minesweeper acquired by the U.S. Navy for the dangerous task of removing mines from minefields laid in the water to prevent ships from passing.

== World War II service ==
Endurance was launched on 19 June 1941 by Gibbs Gas Engine Co., Jacksonville, Florida. Placed in service on 11 October 1941, she served in a noncommissioned status throughout the war in the 10th Naval District. On March 8, 1942, USS Endurance rescued survivors of a U-boat attack on the ESSO Bolivar off the coast of Guantanamo Bay, Cuba.

== Post-war decommissioning ==
She was placed out of service on 6 December 1945 and transferred to the Maritime Administration on 7 July 1947 for disposal.
