= USS Chachalaca =

Minesweeper of the United States Navy

- Chachalaca at her building yard, 28 July 1941.

History

United States
- Name: Chachalaca
- Namesake: Bird: Chachalaca
- Builder: Bristol Yacht Building Co., South Bristol, Maine
- Laid down: 27 December 1940
- Launched: 11 June 1941
- Sponsored by: Miss Joanne Witherell
- Commissioned: Never commissioned
- In service: 11 September 1941
- Out of service: 4 January 1946
- Stricken: 8 May 1946
- Fate: Sold 10 September 1947

General characteristics
- Class & type: Accentor-class minesweeper
- Displacement: 173 tons
- Length: 97 ft 1 in (29.59 m)
- Beam: 21 ft 6 in (6.55 m)
- Draft: 9 ft (2.7 m)
- Speed: 10 knots (19 km/h; 12 mph)
- Complement: 17
- Armament: 2 × .50 cal (12.7 mm) machine guns

Chachalaca (AMc-41) was an Accentor-class minesweeper built by the Bristol Yacht Building Company, South Bristol, Maine and delivered to the U.S. Navy at the Boston Navy Yard in August 1941.

== Construction ==
Chachalaca was down on 27 December 1940 by the Bristol Yacht Building Co., South Bristol, Maine, launched on 11 June 1941 and delivered to the Navy at the Boston Navy Yard 25 August 1941. The vessel was placed in service on 11 September 1941 with plans to report to Commandant, Fifth Naval District, for training at the Mine Warfare School at Yorktown, Virginia. Those plans were delayed by materiel conditions despite a request from the Chief of Naval Operations for accelerated readiness. After missing several departure dates the vessel departed Boston on 5 January 1942 arriving at Hampton Roads on 8 January.

Chachalaca and Caracara moored alongside a pier at Trinidad, 10 August 1942.

== Service ==
After training Chachalaca was assigned to the 10th Naval District sailing in company with Montcalm (AT-39) for San Juan, Puerto Rico on 24 January 1942 arriving 28 January. The minesweeper was assigned to the Naval Operating Base at Trinidad on 1 April 1942 and began daily operations there. Those operations were interrupted with failures of the cable for the magnetic sweep. Local repairs were unsatisfactory with another break the day after repair. Caracara (AMc-40), the other minesweeper assigned to the area, also suffered failures. The Commander Inshore Patrol, Trinidad Sector, on 4 April 1942 requesting Bureau of Ships provide adequate spares noted the two vessels were "the only two vessels available between the British and ourselves that are capable of actually doing a sweeping job in the Gulf of Paria."

The ship was assigned to the Caribbean Sea Frontier 23 July 1942 through 21 April 1944 when again reporting to Commandant, Tenth Naval District. Chachalaca continued minesweeping operations until the end of the war in the Atlantic and Europe. On 27 June 1945 the vessel was assigned to Commandant, Sixth Naval District based at Charleston, South Carolina. Chachalaca arrived there on 7 September 1945 where the vessel was placed out of service 4 January 1946 and stricken on 8 May. On 10 September 1947 the vessel was sold through the U.S. Maritime Commission to Evald Sooder of Miami, Florida.
