= USS Pluck (AMc-94) =

U.S. Navy minesweeper

History

United States
- Name: Pluck
- Laid down: 7 June 1941
- Launched: 4 April 1942
- In service: 6 October 1942
- Out of service: 12 November 1945
- Stricken: 8 May 1946
- Fate: transferred to the Maritime Commission 24 November 1947, for disposal

General characteristics
- Class & type: Accentor-class minesweeper
- Displacement: 228 tons
- Length: 97 ft 1 in (29.59 m)
- Beam: 22 ft (6.7 m)
- Draught: 9 ft (2.7 m)
- Speed: 10 knots (19 km/h; 12 mph)
- Complement: 17
- Armament: 2 × .50 cal (12.7 mm) machine guns; 2 × .30 cal (7.62 mm) machine guns

USS Pluck (AMc-94) was an Accentor-class minesweeper acquired by the U.S. Navy for the task of removing naval mines laid in the water to prevent ships from passing.

Pluck, a wooden-hulled coastal minesweeper, was laid down 7 June 1941 by the Noank Shipbuilding Co., Noank, Connecticut, launched 4 April 1942 and placed in service 6 October 1942, Lt. (j.g.) J. C. Butt, USNR, in charge.

== World War II service ==
Following shakedown and training, Pluck departed Miami, Florida, 19 February 1943, for San Juan, Puerto Rico. She soon operated from the American naval base at Trinidad, British West Indies. She conducted minesweeping operations in the Caribbean to protect Allied shipping.

== Post-war inactivation ==
Pluck was decommissioned 12 November 1945. She was struck from the Naval Vessel Register 8 May 1946. Transferred to the Maritime Commission 24 November 1947, she was subsequently sold.
