= USS Sparrow (MHC-42) =

Minesweeper of the United States Navy

History

United States
- Name: USS LCI(L)-1098
- Builder: Defoe Shipbuilding Company; Bay City, Michigan
- Laid down: 4 October 1944
- Launched: 17 October 1944
- Commissioned: 23 October 1944
- Decommissioned: 5 June 1946
- Renamed: USS Sparrow (AMCU-42), 7 March 1952
- Namesake: sparrow
- Refit: Charleston Naval Shipyard
- Recommissioned: 23 October 1953
- Reclassified: MHC-42, 7 February 1955
- Decommissioned: 12 April 1955
- Stricken: 1 January 1960
- Fate: fate unknown

General characteristics
- Class & type: LCI(L)-351-class landing craft infantry
- Displacement: 236 long tons (240 t) light; 264 long tons (268 t) landing; 419 long tons (426 t) loaded
- Length: 158 ft 5.5 in (48.298 m)
- Beam: 23 ft 3 in (7.09 m)
- Draft: Light 3 ft 1.5 in (0.953 m) mean; Landing 2 ft 8 in (0.81 m) forward, 4 ft 10 in (1.47 m) aft; Loaded 5 ft 4 in (1.63 m) forward, 5 ft 11 in (1.80 m) aft
- Propulsion: 2 × 4 GM diesels, 4 per shaft, BHP 1,600, twin variable pitch propellers
- Speed: 16 knots (30 km/h) max; 14 knots (26 km/h) max continuous
- Endurance: 4,000 nautical miles (7,400 km) at 12 knots (22 km/h); 500 nautical miles (930 km) at 15 knots (28 km/h) loaded, 110 tons of fuel
- Capacity: 75 tons
- Troops: 6 Officers, 182 Enlisted
- Complement: 6 officers, 24 enlisted
- Armament: 5 × 20 mm guns
- Armor: 2 in (51 mm) plastic splinter protection on gun turrets, conning tower and pilot house

USS Sparrow (AMCU-42/LCIL-1098) was an LCI(L)-351-class landing craft infantry built for the U.S. Navy for the task of landing troops in combat areas.

The second ship to be named Sparrow by the Navy was laid down as LCI(L)-1098, a large, infantry landing craft, on 4 October 1944 by the Defoe Shipbuilding Company in Bay City, Michigan; launched on 17 October 1944; and commissioned on 23 October 1944.

== World War II service ==
LCI(L)-1098 made her way through Lake Michigan and the Chicago Drainage Canal, down the Illinois River and the Mississippi River, and arrived at New Orleans, Louisiana, on 12 November 1944. She drydocked at New Orleans, then commenced her shakedown cruise to Galveston, Texas. After completing shakedown and amphibious training, she departed Galveston on 6 December 1944.

=== Transfer to the Pacific Theatre ===
She transited the Panama Canal on 13 December, and arrived in San Diego, California, on 27 December. On 11 March 1945, following further exercises and training at San Diego, LCI(L)-1098 got underway for Pearl Harbor, Hawaii, en route to Guam in the Marianas. She entered Pearl Harbor and departed soon thereafter, visiting Eniwetok Atoll along the way to the Marianas. She arrived at Guam on 8 April.

She was assigned harbor patrol and escort duties in the Marianas on 25 April and remained so engaged until 16 December, when she sailed back toward the United States. LCI (L)-1098 stopped at Pearl Harbor from 28 December 1945 until 3 January 1946. She made San Diego on the 15th and remained there for almost a month. On 12 March, she departed San Diego, sailed via the Panama Canal for New Orleans, and arrived there on 2 April. On 5 June 1946, LCI (L)-1098 was placed out of commission, in reserve, and berthed at Green Cove Springs, Florida.

== Redesignation ==
LCI(L)-1098 remained in reserve until October 1953. During this period, she changed designations twice. On 28 February 1949, she was redesignated a large infantry landing ship, LSI(L)-1098. LSI(L)-1098 became a coastal minesweeper and was named Sparrow (AMCU-42) on 7 March 1952; then she moved to Charleston, S.C., for the actual conversion.

== Reactivation in 1953 as AMCU-42 ==
On 23 October 1953, the ship was commissioned as Sparrow (AMCU-42). a month and a day later, she reported to the Commandant, 3d Naval District, for duty. Over the next 18 months, Sparrow operated along the east coast of the United States, from Key West, to New London, Connecticut.

== Final deactivation and decommissioning ==
On 7 February 1955, Sparrow was redesignated a coastal mine hunter, MHC-42, and on 12 April, she was placed in commission, in reserve, at Charleston. In July 1958, Sparrow moved to Mayport, Florida; and, on 1 January 1960, her name was struck from the Navy list.

== Military awards and honors ==
Sparrow (LCI(L)-1098) the American Campaign Medal - Asiatic-Pacific Campaign Medal - World War II Victory Medal for World War II service and National Defense Service Medal as AMCU-41.
