= USS Jacamar (AMc-47) =

Minesweeper of the United States Navy

History

United States
- Name: USS Jacamar
- Builder: Greenport Basin and Construction Company
- Launched: 10 March 1941
- Commissioned: 25 June 1941
- Decommissioned: 6 December 1945
- Fate: Sold, Charleston, S.C., 1947

General characteristics
- Class & type: Accentor-class minesweeper
- Displacement: 185 long tons (188 t)
- Length: 97 ft 1 in (29.59 m)
- Beam: 22 ft (6.7 m)
- Draft: 8 ft 6 in (2.59 m)
- Speed: 10 knots (19 km/h; 12 mph)
- Complement: 16
- Armament: 2 × .50 cal (12.7 mm) machine guns

USS Jacamar (AMc-47) was an Accentor-class coastal minesweeper of the U.S. Navy. She was built for service during World War II and named after the jacamar.

Jacamar, a wooden-hulled coastal minesweeper, was launched by Greenport Basin and Construction Company, Greenport, Long Island, New York on 10 March 1941 and commissioned on 25 June 1941.

== World War II East Coast operations ==
The new minesweeper departed for training at Mine Warfare School, Yorktown, Virginia, 30 June 1941; and reported for coastal duty with the Atlantic Fleet in July. America's entry into the war in December necessitated an increase in mine protection for vital Atlantic Ocean bases, and Jacamar steamed from Boston, Massachusetts on 9 December for duty at Bermuda. She subsequently performed these vital mine warfare functions at Bermuda and in the Caribbean until returning to Norfolk, Virginia for alterations and new sweeping gear on 3 February 1943.

Jacamar returned to Bermuda in March 1943, remaining there during the next crucial year in the Battle of the Atlantic. She sailed for Norfolk, Virginia, 20 April 1944, and upon arrival took up duty as a towing ship for aircraft target practice offshore. Jacamar remained on this duty, stationed at Hampton Roads, Virginia, until arriving New London, Connecticut, 10 February 1945. Jacamar was at New London, Connecticut when the Germans surrendered in May, and arrived New York 6 June 1945.

== Decommissioning ==
She subsequently engaged in clearing mines in Florida waters before decommissioning at Charleston, South Carolina on 6 December 1945. After being briefly laid up in the Wando River, she was turned over to the Maritime Commission and sold in 1947 to O. R. Murphy, of Charleston.
