= USS Combat (AMc-69) =

Minesweeper of the United States Navy

History

United States
- Laid down: 17 April 1941
- Launched: 6 October 1941
- In service: 24 February 1942
- Out of service: date unknown
- Stricken: date unknown
- Fate: Transferred 5 August 1946 to the Maritime Commission for disposal

General characteristics
- Displacement: 195 tons
- Length: 97 ft 1 in (29.59 m)
- Beam: 22 ft 0 in (6.71 m)
- Draft: 8.5 ft (2.6 m) (mean) (f.)
- Speed: 10.0 knots (19 km/h)
- Complement: 17
- Armament: two .50 cal (12.7 mm) machine guns

USS Combat (AMc-69) was an Accentor-class coastal minesweeper acquired by the U.S. Navy for the dangerous task of removing mines from minefields laid in the water to prevent ships from passing.

Combat, formerly named Comrade, was launched 6 October 1941 by Hogdon Bros., Goudy, and Stevens, East Boothbay, Maine; sponsored by Miss C. Goudy; and placed in service 24 February 1942.

== World War II service ==
She served in the 1st Naval District in New England waters during the war.

== Post-war deactivation ==
Combat was transferred to the Maritime Commission for disposal 5 August 1946.
