= USS Avenge (AMc-66) =

Minesweeper of the United States Navy

History

United States
- Ordered: as Bulwark
- Laid down: 8 May 1941
- Launched: 14 February 1942
- In service: 2 April 1942
- Out of service: 14 December 1945
- Stricken: 8 January 1946
- Fate: Sold to United Fisheries

General characteristics
- Class & type: Accentor-class minesweeper
- Displacement: 195 tons
- Length: 97 ft 1 in (29.59 m)
- Beam: 22 ft 0 in (6.71 m)
- Draft: 8 1/2 ft (2.6 m) (mean) (f.)
- Speed: 10 knots (19 km/h; 12 mph)
- Complement: 17
- Armament: 2 × .50 cal (12.7 mm) machine guns

USS Avenge (AMc-66) was an Accentor-class minesweeper acquired by the U.S. Navy for the task of removing naval mines laid in the water to prevent ships from passing.

Bulwark was laid down on 8 May 1941 at South Bristol, Maine, by the Bristol Yacht Building Co.; renamed Avenge on 17 May 1941; launched on 14 February 1942; sponsored by Mrs. William A. Parker; and placed in service at Boston, Massachusetts, on 2 April 1942.

== World War II service ==
Following fitting out at Boston, Avenge sailed for Hampton Roads, Virginia, and arrived at Yorktown, Virginia, on 23 April for training at the Mine Warfare School. Upon completion of the training, Avenge reported to the 6th Naval District, Charleston, South Carolina, for duty.

Avenge served at Charleston for the duration of her career.

== Post-war deactivation ==
On 14 December 1945, Avenge was placed out of service and laid up in the Wando River. Her name was struck from the Navy list on 8 January 1946, and the ship was turned over to the Maritime Commission for disposal on 8 August. Avenge was subsequently sold to the United Fisheries Co., Gloucester, Massachusetts.
