= USS Energy (AMc-78) =

Minesweeper of the United States Navy

History

United States
- Name: Energy
- Laid down: date unknown
- Launched: 20 September 1941
- Commissioned: 1 January 1942
- Decommissioned: 9 November 1942
- In service: as YDT-3, July 1946
- Stricken: date unknown
- Fate: Sold 1960, fate not known

General characteristics
- Class & type: Accentor-class minesweeper
- Displacement: 219 tons (f.)
- Length: 97 ft 6 in (29.72 m)
- Beam: 22 ft 3 in (6.78 m)
- Draught: 9 ft (2.7 m)
- Speed: 10 knots (19 km/h)
- Complement: 17
- Armament: two .50 cal (12.7 mm) machine guns

USS Energy (AMc-78) was an Accentor-class minesweeper acquired by the U.S. Navy for the task of removing naval mines laid in the water to prevent ships from passing.

Energy was launched 20 September 1941 by W. A. Robinson, Inc., of Ipswich, Massachusetts; sponsored by Mrs. E. Benedix; and commissioned 1 January 1942. After conducting tests at the Mine Warfare School at Yorktown, Virginia, Energy arrived at St. George’s, Bermuda 24 March 1942, for sweeping duty until 20 October, when she sailed for Boston, Massachusetts. Here she was decommissioned 9 November 1942, and given "in-service" status. She became YDT-3 in July 1946 and continued to serve with the 1st Naval District. She was reported sold in 1960.
