= USS Caracara =

Minesweeper of the United States Navy

- Caracara off South Bristol, Maine, 7 October 1941.

History

United States
- Name: Caracara
- Namesake: Bird: Caracara
- Builder: Bristol Yacht Building Co.
- Laid down: 26 December 1940
- Launched: 23 August 1941
- In service: 30 December 1941
- Out of service: 28 December 1945
- Stricken: 21 January 1946
- Fate: Sold 25 July 1947 to Roland I. Styron, of Cash Corner, N.C.

General characteristics
- Class & type: Accentor-class minesweeper
- Displacement: 173 long tons (176 t)
- Length: 97 ft 1 in (29.59 m)
- Beam: 21 ft 6 in (6.55 m)
- Draft: 9 ft (2.7 m)
- Propulsion: Diesels, 2 shafts
- Speed: 10 knots (19 km/h; 12 mph)
- Complement: 17
- Armament: 4 × .50 cal (12.7 mm) machine guns

Caracara (AMc-40), an Accentor-class minesweeper placed in service by the U.S. Navy for use during World War II. The vessel was named after the caracara, a large South American bird of prey.

== Construction ==
Caracara was laid down on 26 December 1940 and launched on 23 August 1941 by the Bristol Yacht Building Co., South Bristol, Maine.

== Service ==
Caracara was delivered to the Navy at the Boston Navy Yard on 3 December 1941 and placed in service on 30 December 1941.

After training with Experimental Minesweeping Group, Mine Warfare School, the vessel was assigned to theto the 10th Naval District, Naval Operating Base (NOB) at Trinidad on 1 April 1942 for minesweeping. Those operations were interrupted with failures of the cable for the magnetic sweep. Local repairs were unsatisfactory with another break the day after repair. Chachalaca (AMc-41), the other minesweeper assigned to the area, also suffered failures. The Commander Inshore Patrol, Trinidad Sector, on 4 April 1942 requesting Bureau of Ships provide adequate spares noted the two vessels were "the only two vessels available between the British and ourselves that are capable of actually doing a sweeping job in the Gulf of Paria."

The ship was assigned to the Caribbean Sea Frontier 23 July 1942 through 21 April 1944 when again reporting to Commandant, Tenth Naval District. Caracara continued minesweeping operations until the end of the war in the Atlantic and Europe.

Caracara was placed out of service at Charleston, South Carolina 28 December 1945 and stricken from the Navy Register on 21 January 1946. The vessel was sold through the U.S. Maritime Commission and delivered to purchaser Roland I. Styron, of Cash Corner, N.C. on 25 July 1947.
