= USS Courlan (AMc-44) =

Minesweeper of the United States Navy

History

United States
- Laid down: 20 January 1941
- Launched: 4 April 1941
- In service: 1941
- Out of service: 1947
- Fate: Stricken 3 July 1946

General characteristics
- Displacement: 205 tons
- Length: 97 ft 5 in (29.69 m)
- Beam: 22 ft 5 in (6.83 m)
- Draught: 8 ft 11 in (2.72 m)
- Speed: 10.0 knots
- Complement: 17
- Armament: two .50 cal (12.7 mm) machine guns

USS Courlan (AMc-44) was an Accentor-class coastal minesweeper acquired by the U.S. Navy for the dangerous task of removing mines from minefields laid in the water to prevent ships from passing.

The first ship to be named Courlan by the Navy, AMC-44 served in an "in service" status from 1941 to 1947.
