= USS Exultant (AMc-79) =

Minesweeper of the United States Navy

History

United States
- Name: Exultant
- Laid down: 29 April 1941
- Launched: 27 September 1941
- In service: 14 January 1942
- Out of service: 1962
- Fate: Disposed of as a target 1 July 1973

General characteristics
- Class & type: Accentor-class minesweeper
- Displacement: 195 tons
- Length: 97 ft (30 m)
- Beam: 21 ft (6.4 m)
- Draft: 9 ft 1 in (2.77 m)
- Speed: 10 knots (19 km/h)
- Complement: 15
- Armament: 2 × .50 cal (12.7 mm) machine guns

USS Exultant (AMc-79) was an Accentor-class minesweeper acquired by the U.S. Navy.

== World War II service ==
Exultant was launched on 27 September 1941 by W. A. Robinson Inc., Ipswich, Massachusetts; sponsored by Mrs. A. T. Leavitt Jr.; and placed in service on 14 January 1942 for minesweeping in the 6th Naval District out of Charleston, South Carolina.

== Reclassified YDT-4 ==
On 15 February 1943 she was reclassified YDT-4, and assigned to the 1st Naval District as a diving tender. She continued to perform this duty through 1962.

As the unnamed YDT-4, she was disposed of as a target 1 July 1973.
