= USS Bulwark (AMc-68) =

Minesweeper of the United States Navy

History

United States
- Laid down: 15 April 1941
- Launched: 6 October 1941
- In service: 5 February 1942
- Out of service: 18 June 1946
- Stricken: 3 July 1946
- Fate: Sold to the city of Boston on 12 September 1946

General characteristics
- Displacement: 195 tons
- Length: 97 ft 1 in (29.59 m)
- Beam: 22 ft 0 in (6.71 m)
- Draught: 8 ft 6 in (2.59 m) (mean) (f.)
- Speed: 10.0 knots
- Complement: 17
- Armament: two .50 cal (12.7 mm) machine guns

USS Bulwark (AMc-68) was an Accentor-class coastal minesweeper acquired by the U.S. Navy for the dangerous task of removing mines from minefields laid in the water to prevent ships from passing.

Bulwark was laid down on 15 April 1941 at East Boothbay, Maine, by Hodgden Bros. & Goudy & Stevens; launched on 6 October 1941; sponsored by Miss Barbara Small; and placed in service at Boston, Massachusetts, on 5 February 1942.

== World War II service ==
Assigned to the section base at Boston, Bulwark spent her entire Navy career patrolling the waters of the 1st Naval District. She searched for submarines in coastal waters and for enemy offensive mines in those same areas. The warship also served as a training platform for minesweeping students based at Provincetown, Massachusetts.

== Post-war inactivation ==
Bulwark was placed out of service at the Boston Naval Shipyard on 18 June 1946. Her name was struck from the Navy list on 3 July 1946, and she was sold to the city of Boston on 12 September 1946 and overhauled to become the MV Joseph J. Luna. As the MV Luna it served the Boston Fire Department in active service as Engine 47 then later as 31 until retirement in 1976. 1976 it was sold to a private citizen who used it as a houseboat until it sank into Boston Harbor in 2009.
