= USS Develin =

Minesweeper of the United States Navy

History

United States
- Name: Develin
- Launched: 10 April 1941
- In service: 9 July 1941
- Stricken: 31 July 1946
- Fate: Unknown

General characteristics
- Class & type: Accentor-class minesweeper
- Displacement: 205 tons
- Length: 97 ft 5 in (29.69 m)
- Beam: 22 ft 5 in (6.83 m)
- Draft: 8 ft 11 in (2.72 m)
- Speed: 10 knots (19 km/h; 12 mph)
- Complement: 17
- Armament: 2 × .50 cal (12.7 mm) machine guns

USS Develin (AMc-45) was an Accentor-class minesweeper acquired by the U.S. Navy for the task of removing naval mines laid in the water to prevent ships from passing.

Develin was launched by the Gibbs Gas Engine Co., Jacksonville, Florida, on 10 April 1941.

== World War II service ==
She was placed in service on 9 July 1941 and served in the 8th Naval District and the Potomac River Naval Command.

== Post-war deactivation ==
She was removed from the Navy List on 31 July 1946.
