= USS Accentor (AMc-36) =

Lead ship of Accentor-class minesweeper

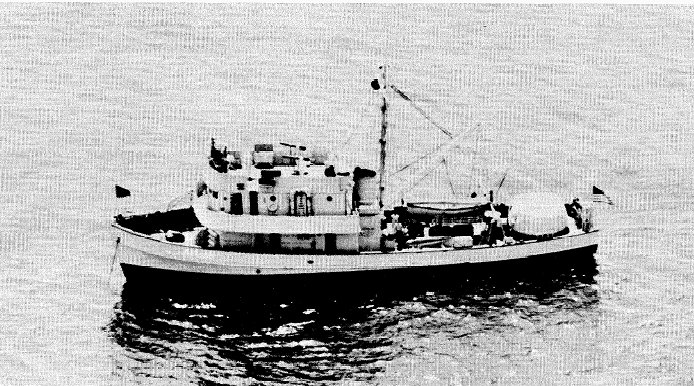
- USS Accentor

History

United States
- Name: Accentor
- Namesake: Accentor
- Builder: W. A. Robinson, Inc., Ipswich, Massachusetts
- Laid down: 21 January 1941
- Launched: 10 May 1941
- Commissioned: 24 July 1941
- Decommissioned: 1 September 1942
- In service: 1 September 1942
- Out of service: 14 June 1946
- Stricken: 3 July 1946
- Identification: Hull symbol:AMc-36; Code letters:NAEO
- Fate: Sold as surplus, October 1946

General characteristics
- Class & type: Accentor-class minesweeper
- Displacement: 221 long tons (225 t)
- Length: 97 ft 6 in (29.72 m)
- Beam: 22 ft 6 in (6.86 m)
- Draft: 8 ft 11 in (2.72 m)
- Installed power: 1 × Cooper Bessemer G. N.-8-STB diesel engine; 400 bhp (300 kW)
- Propulsion: 1 × screws
- Speed: 10 kn (12 mph; 19 km/h)
- Complement: 17
- Armament: 2 × .5 in (13 mm) caliber machine guns

The first USS Accentor (AMc-36) was the lead boat of the Accentor of coastal minesweepers in the service of the United States Navy, named after the accentor bird.

She was laid down on 21 January 1941 by W. A. Robinson, launched on 10 May 1941 and commissioned at the Boston Navy Yard on 24 July 1941.

== Pre World War II ==
Following outfitting there and shakedown training in nearby waters and off the Virginia capes, the coastal minesweeper arrived at Portland, Maine on 26 September and reported to the commanding officer of Mine Division 26 for duty in the inshore patrol. For almost one year — but for a month of availability at the Boston Navy Yard from 18 March to 17 April 1942 — she performed her duties of streaming and sweeping for mines. During this time, the United States entered World War II on 7 December 1941.

== World War II ==
In mid-August 1942, orders arrived directing Accentor to proceed via Boston to Annapolis, Maryland for minesweeping tests in the Chesapeake Bay. She departed Portland on 22 August and reached the United States Naval Academy six days later. She was decommissioned there on 1 September and simultaneously placed in service. She spent the remainder of her naval career operating in the Chesapeake Bay region, for the most part under the auspices of the Naval Mine Warfare Proving Ground at Solomons Island, Maryland.

== Post World War II ==
After World War II ended and most postwar minesweeping tasks had been completed, Accentor was placed out of service on 14 June 1946 and, a week later, declared surplus to the Navy needs. Struck from the Navy list on 3 July 1946, she was transferred early in October 1946 to the Maritime Commission for disposal and sold to Higgins, Inc., of New Orleans, Louisiana. She was delivered to that company at Lake Charles, Louisiana on 9 October 1946.
