= Accentor-class minesweeper =

1941 class of minesweepers of the United States Navy

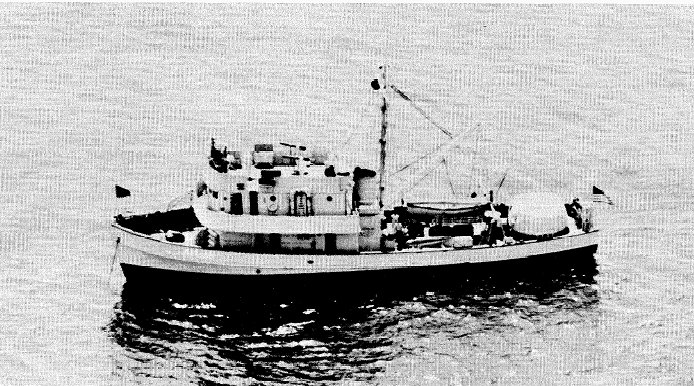
- USS Accentor

Class overview
- Name: Accentor class
- Operators: United States Navy
- Built: 1941–1942
- In commission: 1942–1946
- Completed: 70

General characteristics
- Type: Minesweeper
- Displacement: 185–205 long tons (188–208 t)
- Length: 97 ft 1 in (29.59 m)–98 ft 5 in (30.00 m)
- Beam: 21 ft (6.4 m)–23 ft 7 in (7.19 m)
- Draft: 8 ft 11 in (2.72 m)–10 ft 8 in (3.25 m)
- Propulsion: Diesel engine, 400 hp (300 kW)
- Speed: 10 knots (19 km/h)
- Complement: 17
- Armament: 2 × .50 cal. M2 Browning machine guns

The Accentor-class minesweeper, sometimes called the Accentor/Acme-class minesweeper, was a small minesweeper used by the United States Navy during World War II. The Accentor-class minesweeper was designed for the sweeping of mines in harbors, bays, and other littoral waters.

== Design ==
The ships of the class were wooden-hulled with a draft between 8 feet 11 inches (2.7 m) and 10 feet 8 inches (3.3 m). Typically, the Accentor-class minesweepers were armed with a pair of .50 caliber machine guns for protection. Rather than creating new minesweeping vessels, forty-five wooden-hulled fishing boats were converted into Accentor-class minesweepers. Since these converted fishing boats were not all the same, their specifications varied slightly. The converted fishing boats had a displacement from 165 to 270 long tons (168 to 274 t). They had speeds from 8.5 knots (15.7 km/h; 9.8 mph) up to 14 knots (26 km/h; 16 mph) and crews from as small as fifteen up to 50.

== Service history ==
In World War II, the Accentor-class minesweepers were used to sweep mines in harbors, bays, and other littoral waters, due to their small size. The minesweepers were used to remove mines placed defensively in harbors and coastal waters by the United States Navy.

== After the war ==
After World War II ended and most postwar minesweeping tasks had been completed, the Accentor-class minesweepers were declared surplus to naval needs. By the end of 1946, all 70 of the Accentor class were decommissioned. They were transferred to the United States Maritime Commission (MARCOM) for disposal. The two .50 caliber machine guns and minesweeping equipment were removed by MARCOM, after which the vessels were sold to various American marine towing companies and fisheries to be used as civilian vessels.

== Ships of the Accentor class ==
- USS Accentor (AMc-36)
- USS Bateleur (AMc-37)
- USS Barbet (AMc-38)
- USS Brambling (AMc-39)
- USS Caracara (AMc-40)
- USS Chachalaca (AMc-41)
- USS Chimango (AMc-42)
- USS Cotinga (AMc-43)
- USS Courlan (AMc-44)
- USS Develin (AMc-45)
- USS Fulmar (AMc-46)
- USS Jacamar (AMc-47)
- USS Limpkin (AMc-48)
- USS Lorikeet (AMc-49)
- USS Marabout (AMc-50)
- USS Ostrich (AMc-51)
- USS Roller (AMc-52)
- USS Skimmer (AMc-53)
- USS Tapacola (AMc-54)
- USS Turaco (AMc-55)
- (AMc-56 through AMc-60 are not a part of the Accentor-class)
- USS Acme (AMc-61)
- USS Adamant (AMc-62)
- USS Advance (AMc-63)
- USS Aggressor (AMc-64)
- USS Assertive (AMc-65)
- USS Avenge (AMc-66)
- USS Bold (AMc-67)
- USS Bulwark (AMc-68)
- USS Combat (AMc-69)
- USS Conqueror (AMc-70)
- USS Conquest (AMc-71)
- USS Courier (AMc-72)
- USS Defiance (AMc-73)
- USS Demand (AMc-74)
- USS Detector (AMc-75)
- USS Dominant (AMc-76)
- USS Endurance (AMc-77)
- USS Energy (AMc-78)
- USS Exultant (AMc-79)
- USS Fearless (AMc-80)
- USS Fortitude (AMc-81)
- USS Governor (AMc-82)
- USS Guide (AMc-83)
- USS Heroic (AMc-84)
- USS Ideal (AMc-85)
- USS Industry (AMc-86)
- USS Liberator (AMc-87)
- USS Loyalty (AMc-88)
- USS Memorable (AMc-89)
- USS Merit (AMc-90)
- USS Observer (AMc-91)
- USS Paramount (AMc-92)
- USS Peerless (AMc-93)
- USS Pluck (AMc-94)
- USS Positive (AMc-95)
- USS Reaper (AMc-96)
- USS Prestige (AMc-97)
- USS Progress (AMc-98)
- USS Radiant (AMc-99)
- USS Reliable (AMc-100)
- USS Rocket (AMc-101)
- USS Royal (AMc-102)
- USS Security (AMc-103)
- USS Skipper (AMc-104)
- USS Stalwart (AMc-105)
- USS Summit (AMc-106)
- USS Trident (AMc-107)
- USS Valor (AMc-108)
- USS Victor (AMc-109)
- USS Vigor (AMc-110)

== See also ==
- APc-1-class small coastal transports a modified Accentor-class minesweeper ship
- Wooden boats of World War 2
