= Burrwood, Louisiana =

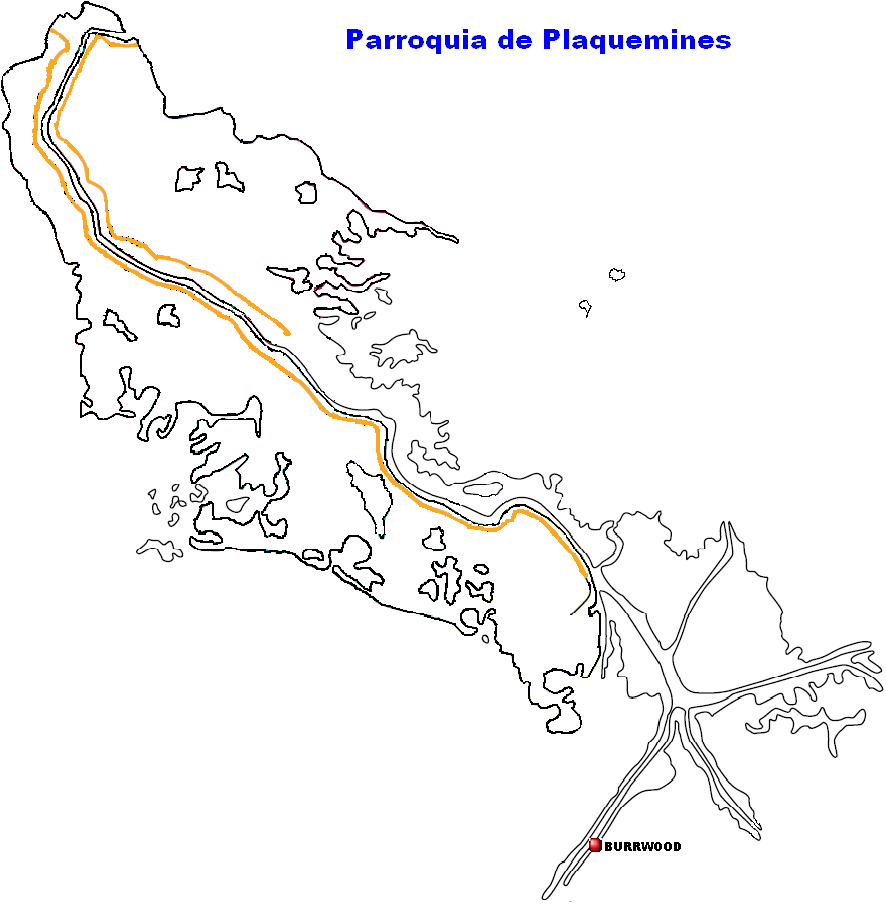
Location of Burrwood within Plaquemines Parish, Louisiana.

Burrwood was a community located near the far south end of the delta of the Mississippi River in Plaquemines Parish, Louisiana, United States. At one time the town had an estimated population of 1,000, but today it is uninhabited, with most of its territory fully or partially submerged by coastal erosion.

The site of this former community is located at the following coordinates: 28°58′05″N 89°22′39″W

== History ==
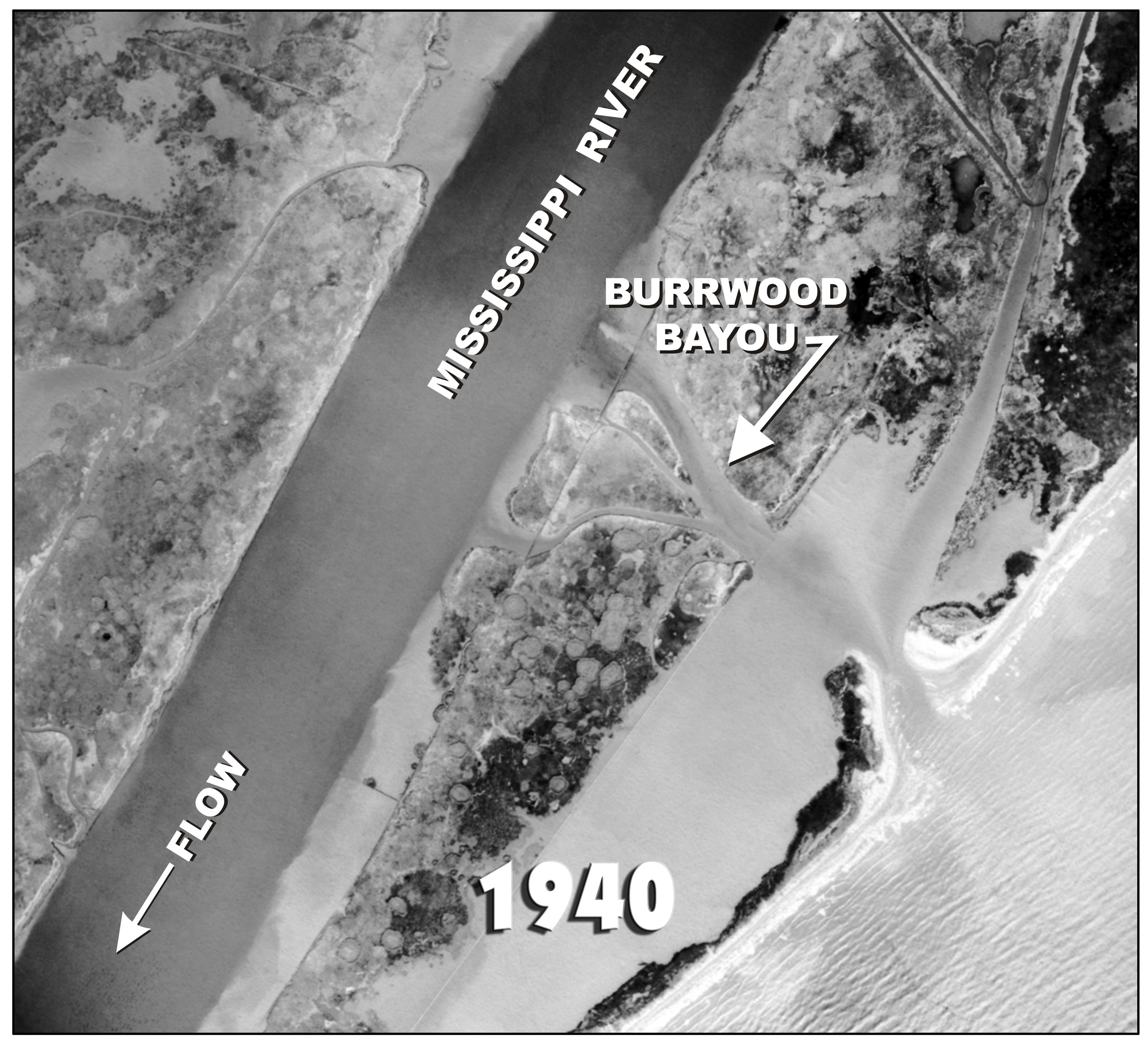
Burrwood Aerial photo taken in 1940

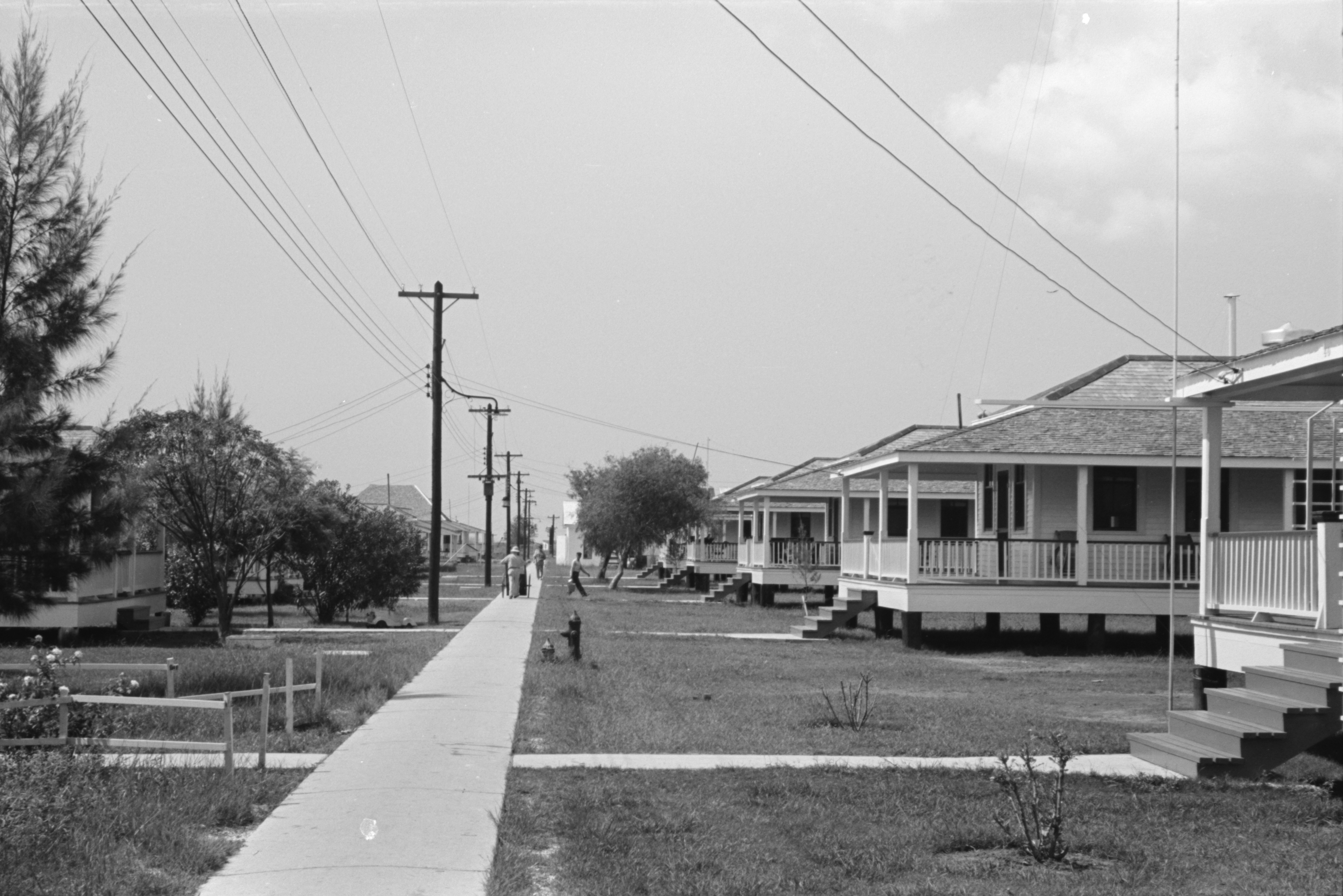
Row of cottages, Burrwood, Louisiana, 1938.

Burrwood was established and maintained by the Army Corps of Engineers on Southwest Pass of the Mississippi River to serve as a base for dredging operations, jetty work, and other activities required to maintain navigable conditions along this channel.

Later, during World War II, the United States created a naval base known as "Section Burrwood Naval Base" to control the presence of enemy ships and submarines in the Gulf of Mexico and to monitor traffic entering the river mouth. The construction of the base began in 1941 and the base was in committee on December 15, 1941, with Lieutenant Commander N.J. Ashley. The Army Corps of Engineers built a tower about 120 feet (37 m) high with a platform above the tank that supported the other tower 75 feet (23 m) smaller in height. Ships from New Orleans and Baton Rouge were inspected here.

In 1942, the U.S. Army created pieces of heavy artillery (mobile howitzers) on both sides of the river in Burrwood. The guns had a range of about 9 miles (14 km). The Army also established a second watchtower in South Pass, near Port Eads. The base was capable of supporting not only civilian pilot boats, tugs, dredgers, patrol boats, but also submarine hunters, mines, PT boats, and ships as large as destroyers.

Between 1942 and 1965, Burrwood was a United States Weather Bureau and Hurricane Warning Office. There were a row of officer houses for the families, a barracks complex for the unmarried men and a two-room school house for the children of the people who manned the station, as well as local fishermen who lived nearby.

== See also ==
- List of ghost towns in Louisiana
