= Wando River =

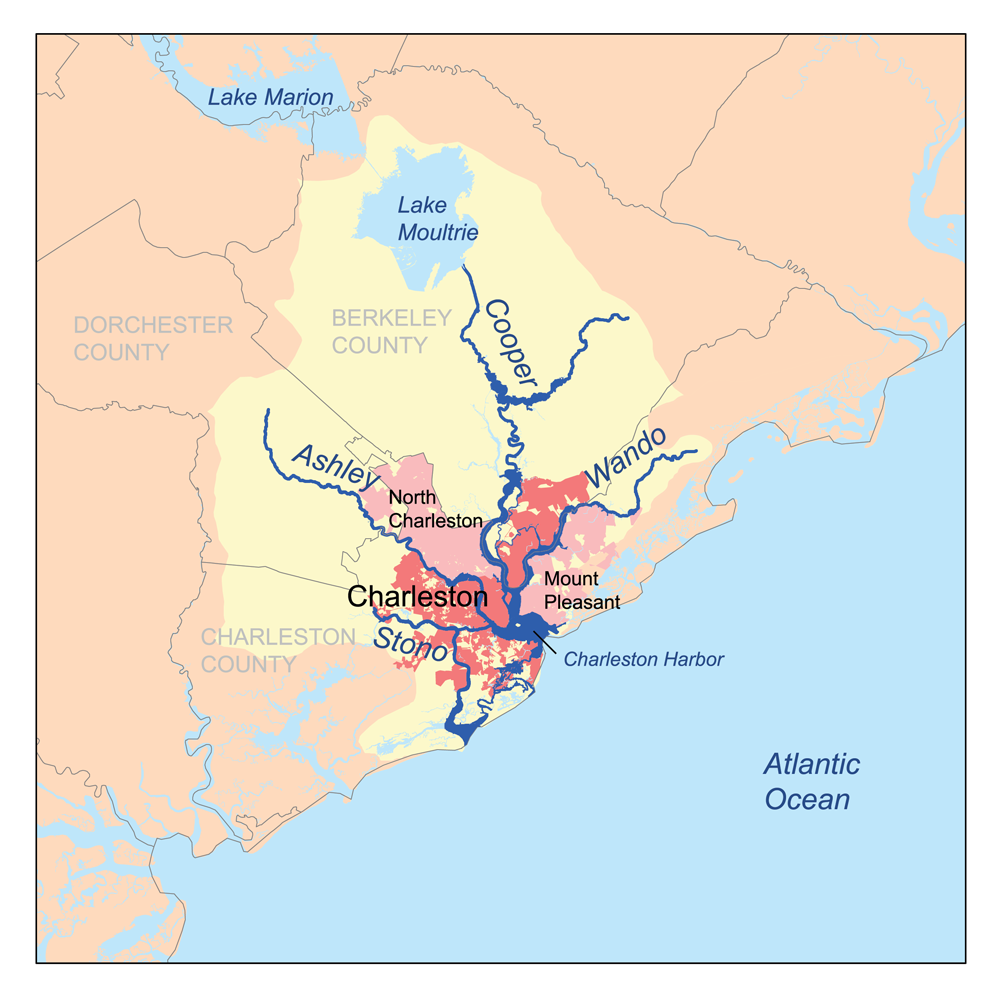
- Map of the Charleston Harbor watershed showing Wando River

- Location of mouth

Location
- Country: United States
- State: South Carolina

Physical characteristics
- Mouth
  - coordinates: 32°48′58″N 79°54′40″W

The Wando River is a tidewater river in the coastal area of South Carolina. It begins in the town of Awendaw, Charleston County, and has its mouth at the Cooper River shortly before it flows into Charleston Harbor. The Wando's drainage area is 73,061 acres (295.67 km^{2}). Nearby Drum Island is uninhabited. It is spanned by the bridges crossing the Wando River and Towne creek.

The river was named for the Wando people, a band of the Cusabo.
