= Coastal minesweeper =

Minesweepers intended for coastal use

Coastal minesweeper is a term used by the United States Navy to indicate a minesweeper intended for coastal use as opposed to participating in fleet operations at sea.

Because of its small size—usually less than 100 feet in length—and construction—wood as opposed to steel—and slow speed—usually about 9 or 10 knots—the coastal minesweeper was considered too fragile and slow to operate on the high seas with the fleet.

Minesweeping, in conjunction with fleet activities, was usually relegated to the diesel-driven steel-hulled AM-type minesweepers, later to be replaced by the wood-hulled MSO-type minesweeper with aluminum engines.
