= USS Constant =

Two ships of the United States Navy have been named USS Constant:

- USS Constant (AM-86), was launched on 9 May 1942 by Commercial Iron Works, Portland, Oregon.
- USS Constant (AM-427), was launched on 14 February 1953 by Fulton Shipyard, Antioch, California.
