= AMC-15 =

AMC-15 may refer to:

- AMC-15 (satellite), a communications satellite that belonged to SES Americom
- USS Waxbill (AMc-15), a coastal minesweeper that belonged to the US Navy
