= John D. Cartano =

American lawyer (1909–2005)

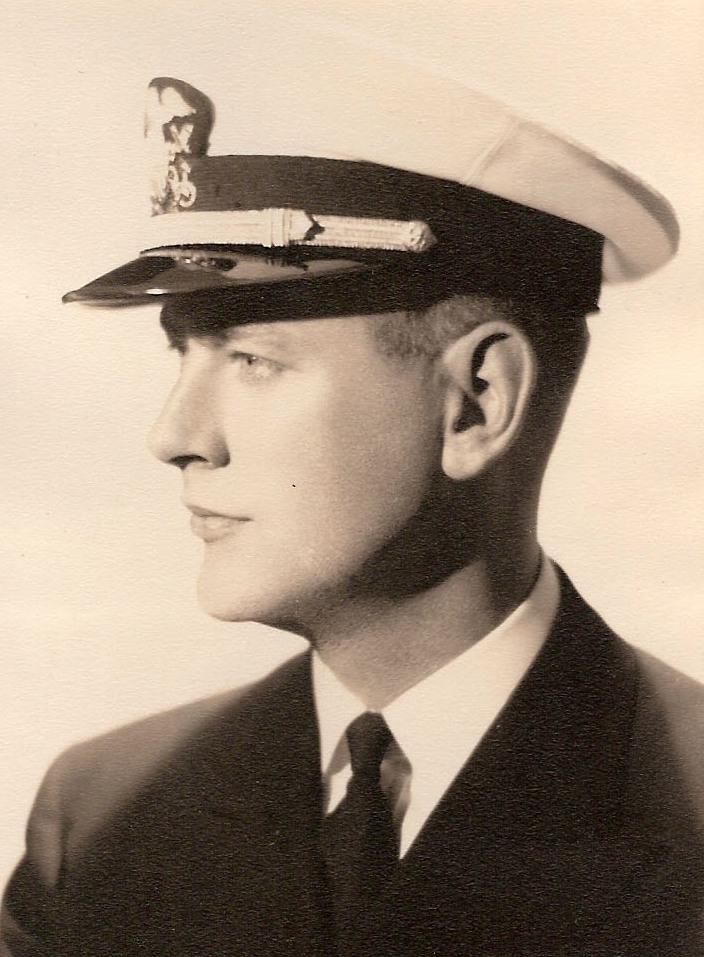
- Born: John Daniel Cartano; April 4, 1909; Seattle, Washington
- Died: July 19, 2005 (aged 96)
- Occupation: Lawyer
- Military career
- Allegiance: United States
- Branch: United States Navy
- Rank: Lieutenant commander

John Daniel Cartano (April 4, 1909 – July 19, 2005) was an American lawyer.

== Early life ==
Cartano was born on April 4, 1909, in Seattle, Washington, to Daniel A. and Margaret Cartano. He graduated from West Seattle High School in 1926, where he was honored as a commencement speaker and 3-year letterman in tennis and golf. At the age of 17, he became the Washington State's champion high school orator, and later placed third in the semifinals of the National Oratorical Contest, behind the former Speaker of the House of Representatives, Carl Albert. He graduated from the University of Washington, in 1930, where he served as vice-president of the student body and was a Phi Beta Kappa.

== Career ==
Cartano received a doctor of law degree from Harvard Law School in 1934. He was the founder of the Seattle law firm of Cartano, Botzer & Chapman, where he worked for over 40 years. Cartano specialized in litigation, personal injury cases, and contract law.

== Seattle civic activities ==
Cartano made his mark on the Seattle community as a prominent civic leader. He served as president of the Seattle Chamber of Commerce in 1961–1962. He served as Vice President of the Seattle Chamber of Commerce in 1959–1960, was a member of the board of trustees and executive committee of the chamber from 1957 to 1960, and was honorary counsel from 1957 to 1959. He was a member of the Chamber's Speakers' Bureau and the Members' Council, Aviation and Political Participation Divisions.

Cartano was a member of the steering committee that brought the World's Fair to Seattle. He served as the campaign manager for Gen. Dwight Eisenhower's presidential campaign in the State of Washington in 1956 and was active in the Republican Party politics for many years. He was instrumental in obtaining the funding for the Space Needle and the Seattle Center.

His public service in Seattle included positions as a member of the Board of Directors of the Arthritis and Rheumatism Foundation, Chairman of the Seattle Chapter, United Nations Association, the United Good Neighbors Speakers Committee, President of the Seattle Chapter of the Naval Reserve Officer's Association and vice-president of the World Affairs Council. Cartano was a member of the Rainier Club, Washington Athletic Club, Harvard Club, College Club, Seattle Tennis Club, Breakfast Club, Speakers Club, Sigma Chi Fraternity, and Olympic Club. He and his wife Jane were members of Sacred Heart Church in Bellevue.

== World War II ==
Cartano served as a Navy Lieutenant and Lieutenant Commander in World War II, in both the Atlantic and Pacific.

His active military duty started in the Pacific where he commanded the USS APc-25 in 1943. He was awarded the Navy and Marine Corps Medal for, according to the citation, "heroism displayed in the rescue of approximately thirty-five survivors from a burning transport which had been subjected to an enemy aerial attack in the Solomon Islands area on August 13, 1943." A Radio Special, used as a promotional advertisement that was played nationally during World War II to recruit workers to build and rehabilitate vessels in the shipyards and to bolster national commitment to World War II, was transcribed as follows:

For every American's war . . . The John Cartano Story. In this dramatic story, which you hear James tell Bethlehem Steel, builders of ships for victory, brings you a message, which we cannot afford to forget. He was always a great sports fan. He loved baseball, football and basketball, and played a darn good game of golf and tennis. His dad loved these games, too, and they played a lot together, all this was back in their hometown of Seattle Washington. By the way, we are talking about John D. Cartano of that city. John did a good job of playing the game of life, too. He graduated from both high school and college with honors. Then he became a successful practicing attorney in a Seattle law firm. Finally, he decided to get into the biggest game that's being played right now, the game of war to victory. He's now Lieutenant John D. Cartano of the United States Navy. The USS John Penn, a transport cargo ship, was just off Guadalcanal. It was August 13, 1943, and she was bringing to a large troop fighting in the Solomon's area a much-needed cargo of ammunition. Suddenly out of the sky screamed a formation of Jap torpedo planes. One enemy plane put her fish right through the engine room of the John Penn. A terrific explosion tore a great hole in the vessel and almost immediately she was a blazing popping inferno. Nearby lying off Guadalcanal was an army patrol craft, the USS APC 25. Her commanding officer, Navy Lieutenant John D. Cartano, saw what was happening to the helpless transport. While the radio communications systems in the vicinity crackled with various opinions on what should be done, he had already made up his mind. In those radio contacts, they were agreeing that it would be too dangerous for other vessels to approach the burning exploding USS Penn. It appeared obvious that there was little chance of saving anyone. The danger of getting anywhere near that exploding inferno was great. But Lieutenant Cartano and his small craft was already proceeding at full speed toward the quickly sinking cargo ship. The USS Penn went down twenty minutes after the torpedo struck. The sea around the sinking ship was aflame with burning oil. But Lieutenant Cartano brought his small craft in as close as he dared and began the job of picking up survivors. He realized he would have to work fast. Some of the men in the water had on life jackets, but others, and among them were many wounded, had none. Lieutenant Cartano got search, rescue, and first aid parties into action immediately. He and his men worked hard, and they worked fast, and later when they counted the survivors, they found Lieutenant Cartano's little patrol craft had pulled out 33 men. The USS Penn's Capt. Roberts suffering from a bad shoulder and burns turned up among the survivors, too. The rescued were given pajamas and coveralls for something to wear, and as they lined up on the beach for roll call to check the missing, another alarm sounded. The Jap planes were coming again and Lieutenant Cartano's rescue had been effective just in time. For his courageous action and splendid initiative, Lieutenant Cartano was awarded the Navy and Marine Corps Medal. Yes, it's men like Lieutenant Cartano who are showing what courage and initiative can accomplish in the conduct of this war, but without ships this war would be impossible. Ships of all kinds are urgently needed to carry a live cargo and to fight the enemy. Men are needed now with or without shipyard experience at the Hobocan Yard of Bethlehem Steel Company to repair, recondition and convert ships required for war service. Here is your chance to get directly behind our boys. Men not in essential industry, also veterans or those classified as 4F or otherwise draft deferred, can learn a technical trade that pays while learning.

Cartano was later reassigned to the Atlantic where he joined the Destroyer Escort Fleet in June 1944 and served until peace was declared. He was the Executive Officer and Navigator of the USS Durik in the Atlantic in 1944 and 1945. He went aboard the Durik as a Lieutenant (j.g.) and then became a Lieutenant Commander. The Durik sailed the Atlantic route with Liberty ships to the Mediterranean, including Bizerte, Algiers and Sicily. The Durik had orders to proceed to the Pacific Fleet to take part in the invasion of Japan when liberty was declared. Cartano was discharged in November 1945. He returned home to Seattle, and became President of the Seattle Chapter of the Reserve Officers Association for two years.

== Family life ==
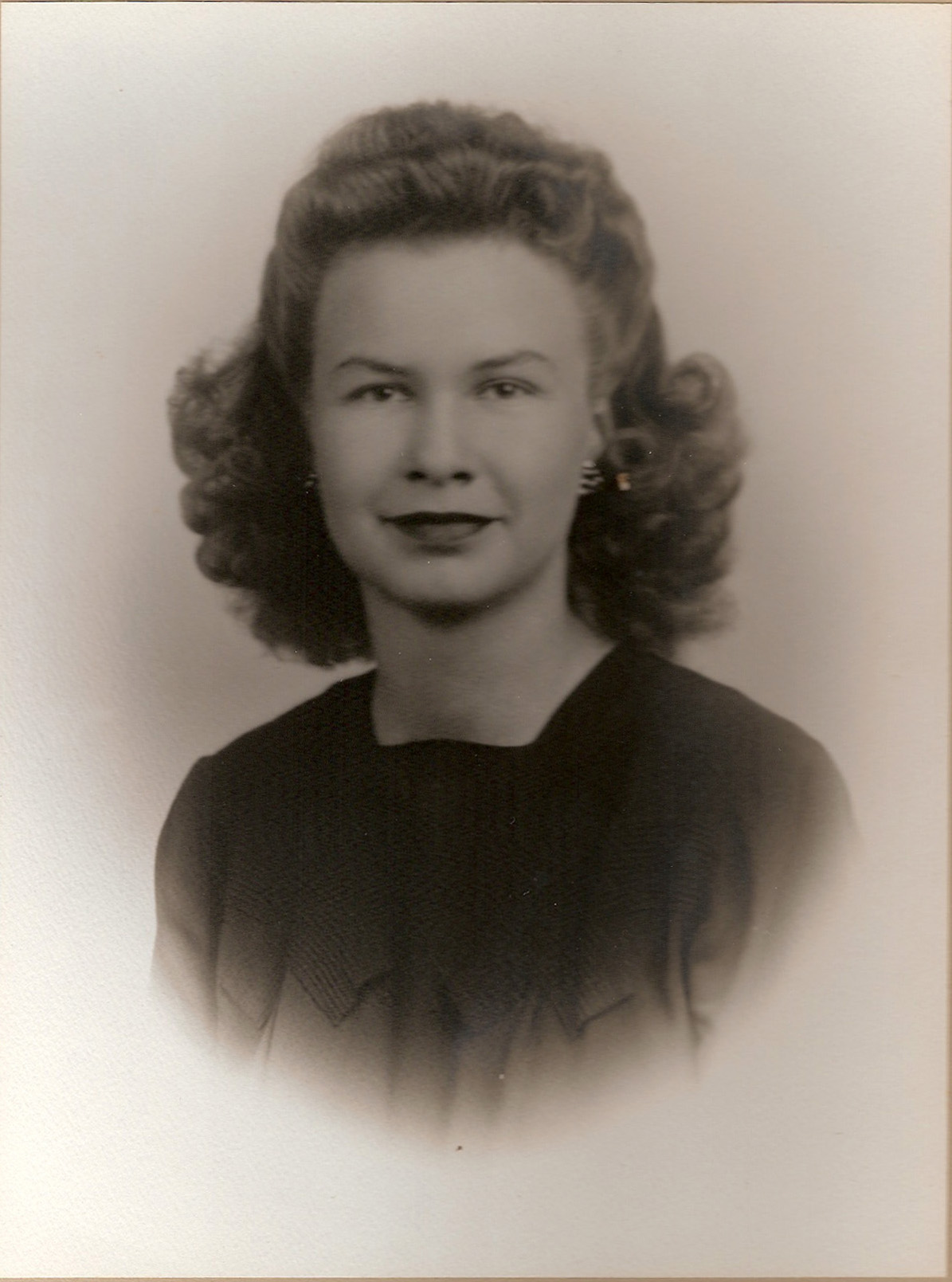
Jane Bronson Cartano (1941)

Cartano was married for 58 years to his wife, Jane Bronson Cartano, who died on May 1, 2005. Jane earned a Masters of Science degree in Nutrition from Iowa State University in 1944. She came to Seattle as the Chief Nutritionist for the Washington State Dairy Council. She met John Cartano in Seattle in 1946. They married in Las Cruces, New Mexico on November 1, 1946, and settled in Bellevue. Cartano celebrated his 58th wedding anniversary with Jane on November 1, 2004. Cartano was survived by seven children, 13 grandchildren, and three great-grandchildren.
