= USS Loyalty (AMc-88) =

Minesweeper of the United States Navy

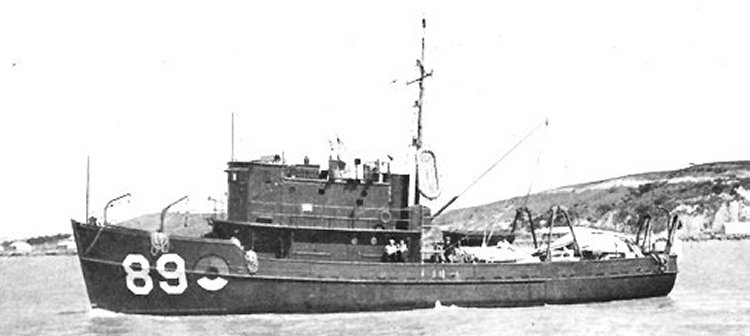
- Accentor-class minesweeper, sister ship Memorable

History

United States
- Builder: Fulton Shipyard
- Laid down: 8 May 1941
- Launched: 23 August 1941
- Commissioned: 15 December 1944
- Decommissioned: 4 December 1945
- In service: 17 January 1942
- Stricken: 19 December 1945
- Fate: Grounded and destroyed, 12 January 1946

General characteristics
- Displacement: 195 tons
- Length: 97 ft 1 in (29.59 m)
- Beam: 22 ft (6.7 m)
- Draft: 9 ft (2.7 m)
- Speed: 10 knots
- Complement: 17
- Armament: two .50 cal (12.7 mm) antiaircraft machine guns., two .30 cal (7.62 mm)

USS Loyalty (AMc-88) was an Accentor-class coastal minesweeper acquired by the U.S. Navy for the dangerous task of removing mines from minefields laid in the water to prevent ships from passing.

Loyalty was laid down by Fulton Shipyard, Antioch, California, 8 May 1941; launched 23 August 1941; sponsored by Mrs. Donald Noackk; and placed in service 17 January 1942.

Assigned to the 14th Naval District, Loyalty, performed patrol and minesweeping operations out of Pearl Harbor. She was commissioned 15 December 1944, Lt. Robert H. Grayson in command. Following conversion to an underwater location ship, Loyalty sailed 1 May 1945 for the western Pacific. After touching Eniwetok, Guam, and Saipan, the minesweeper arrived Okinawa 18 June.

Throughout the summer, Loyalty operated out of Okinawa on various underwater demolition and salvage mission. Her duties included the blasting of a sunken Japanese ammunition ship and the removal of 40 depth charges from a sunken enemy destroyer.

She remained in the western Pacific after V-J Day. While en route to Unten Ko, Okinawa, 16 September, she struck a reef and grounded. Loyalty decommissioned 4 December 1945 and was struck from the Navy list the 19th. She was destroyed 12 January 1946.

Loyalty received one battle star for World War II service.
