= APc-1-class transport =

Type of World War 2 United States Ship

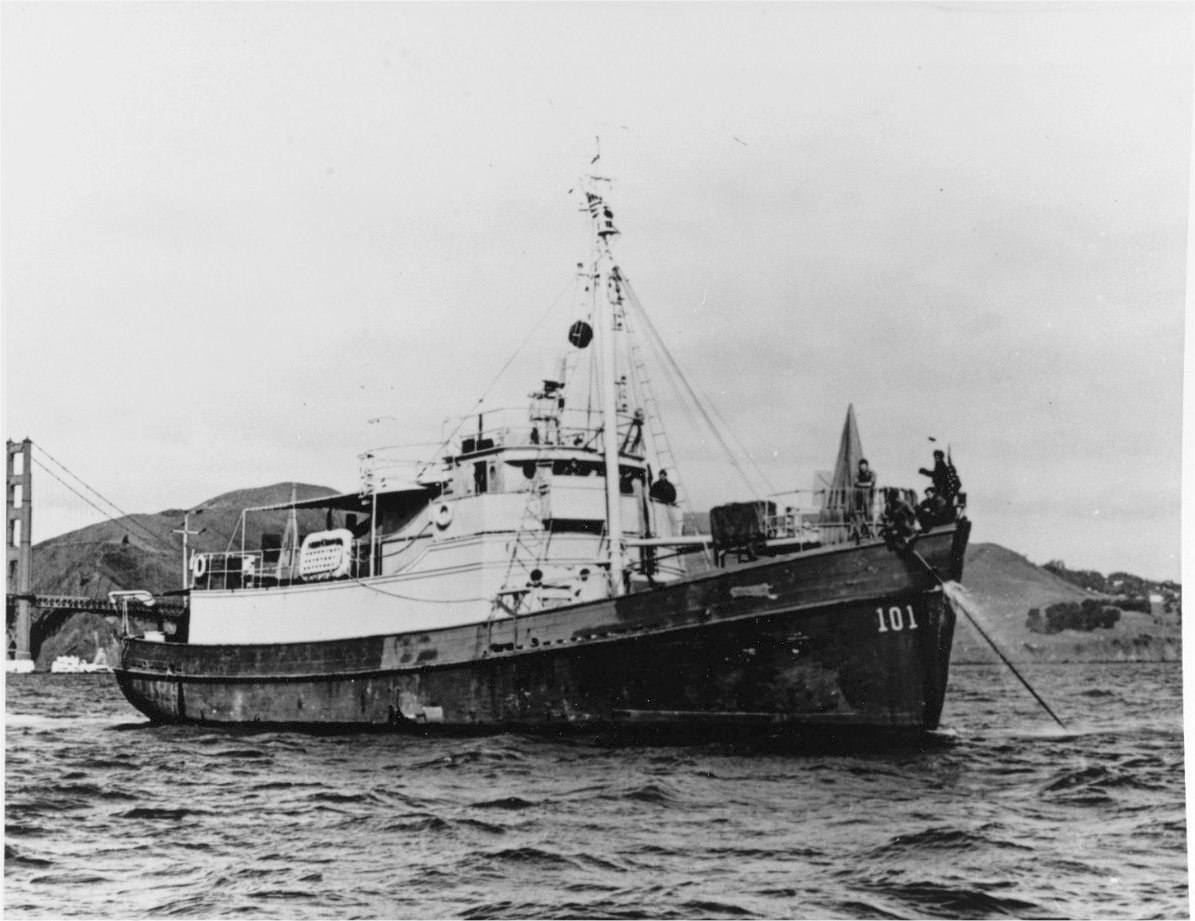
- Small Coastal Transport APc-1 class, APc-101 at sea

Class overview
- Builders: Herreshoff Manufacturing Company; Fulton Shipyard; Cryer & Sons; Warren Boat Yard; Camden Shipbuilding; Hodgdon Yachts; Anderson & Cristofani; Lynch Shipbuilding; Harry G. Marr; W. A. Robinson, Inc.; Bristol Yachts; Noank Shipbuilding
- Operators: United States Navy
- Built: 1942-1943
- In commission: 1942–1945

General characteristics
- Type: Small coastal transport
- Displacement: 100 tons
- Length: 103 ft 3 in (31.47 m)
- Beam: 21 ft 3 in (6.48 m)
- Draft: 9 ft 3 in (2.82 m)
- Propulsion: 400 hp (300 kW) diesel engine
- Speed: 10 knots (19 km/h; 12 mph)
- Complement: 21
- Armament: 2 x 20 mm cannon

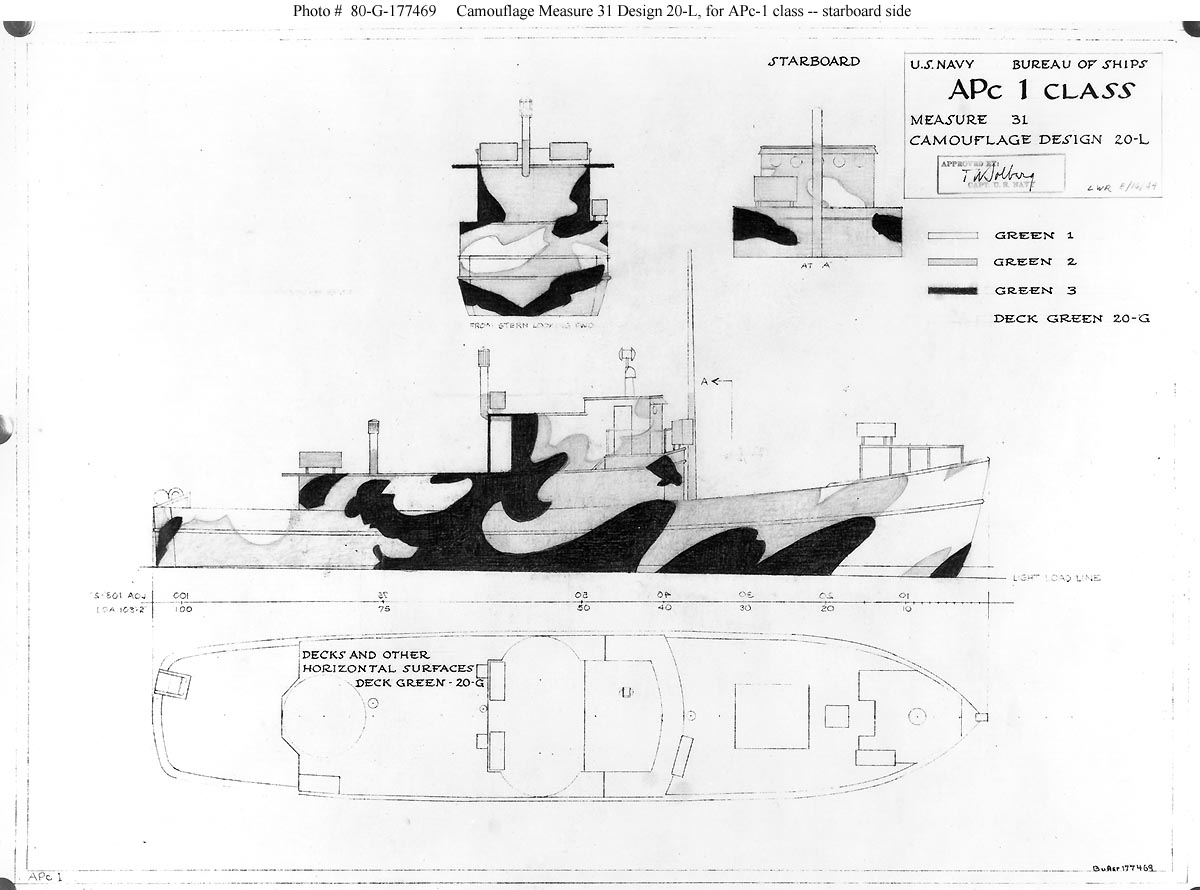
APc-1-class small coastal transport, drawing in camouflage, measure 31, design 20-L

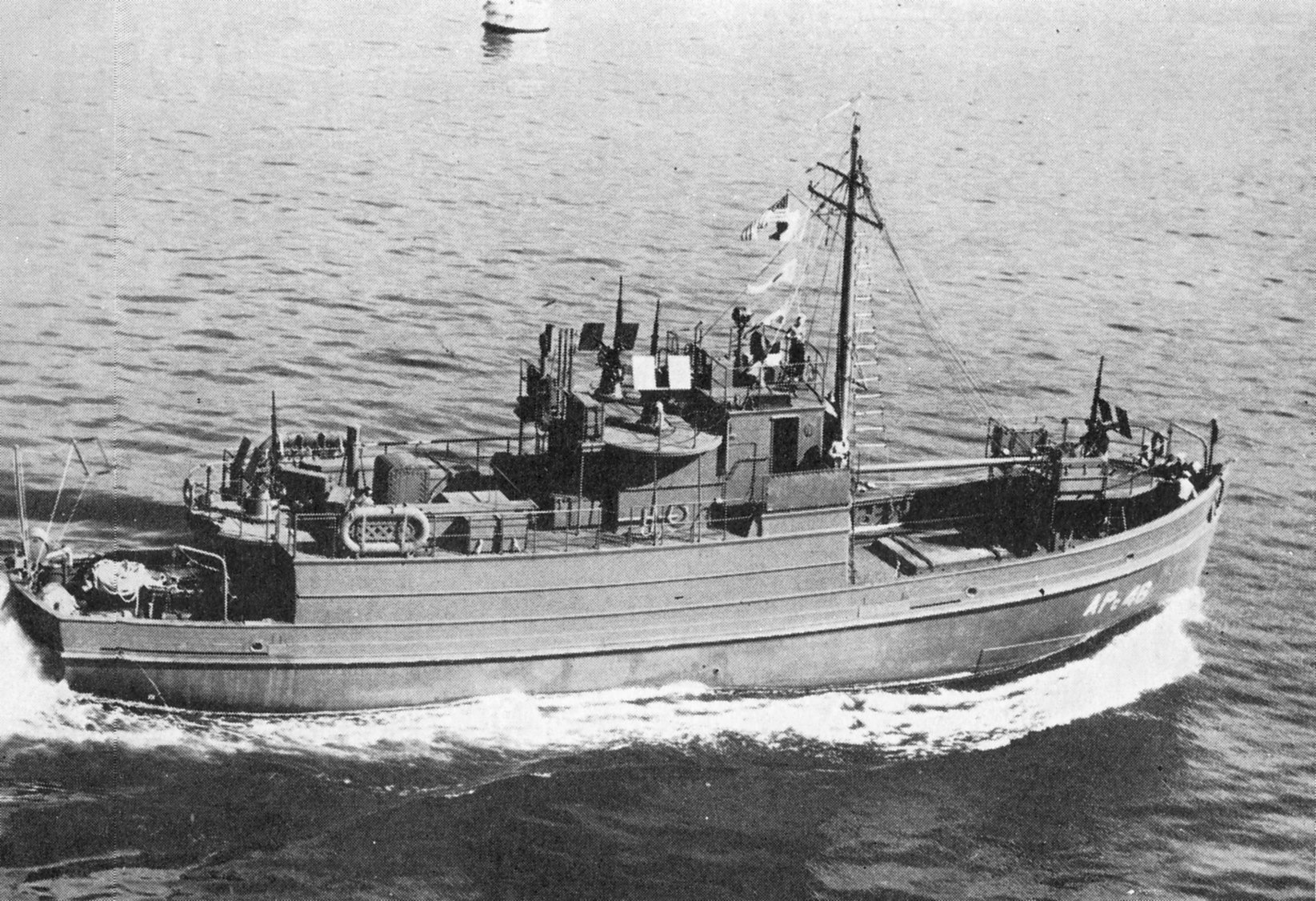
USS APc-46, underway a US Navy APc-1-class Small Coastal Transport

APc-1-class small coastal transports were a troopship design used during World War 2 for the United States Navy (USN). These ships were assigned to the Pacific War where they transported supplies, personnel and munitions around the Island hopping campaign. Many of the ships were under threat of air, sea and submarine attack. A few ships of the class received battle stars for combat valor, including USS APc-15, USS APc-22, USS APc-25 and USS APc-26. The wooden-hulled ships were built by many different shipyards. Following the war, many of them were converted to fishing vessels.

== Design ==
The design is based on the wooden-hulled USN AMc Accentor-class minesweeper. The USN Chief of Naval Operations gave the order for the construction of 50 AMc coastal minesweepers, AMc-150–AMc-199 on January 19, 1942. The Bureau of Ships issued the specifications for the modified coastal minesweepers design for ships AMc 150–AMc-199 in February 1942.

Then Chief of Naval Operations issued a request that the 50 ships be constructed as "raider transports, AP," for use in the South Pacific War on April 13, 1942. The coastal minesweepers design was modified, as the need for a small coastal transports was great at the time. Many planned, or under construction, AMc coastal minesweepers were changed to APc small coastal transports.

Of the many APc-1-class small coastal transports built, ten ships, APc-85 to APc-94, were transferred to work in the United States Atlantic Fleet. Some were transferred to the United Kingdom under the Lend-Lease act.

After the war the USN converted some to personnel ferries with a capacity of up to 250 persons by removing some of the open sea ballast and by the removal of the deck guns, although many were sold to be fishing boats.

The specifications for modified coastal minesweepers redesign, where given by the District Craft Development Board on April 20, 1942. The redesign gave three planned uses for new APc transport ships:

1. Transportation of two officers and 74 men (possibly a raiding party) for 24 hours.
2. Transportation of two officers, 15 men, and a cargo of 1,500 cu ft (42 m^{3}) for 24 hours.
3. Carrying a cargo of 4,000 cu ft (110 m^{3}) (17 tons) and no passengers on a voyage of 2,500 mi (4,000 km).

== Description ==
The ships had a displacement of 100 tons, a length of 103 ft 3 in (31.47 m), a beam of 21 ft 3 in (6.48 m) and a draft of 9 ft 3 in (2.82 m). For service electrical need the ships had two diesel 30 kW 120V DC service generators. The ships had a fuel capacity of 145 barrels (6,100 US gal) of diesel fuel. The ships had a large boom with a capacity of 3 tons to load and unload cargo. Ships were armed with two Oerlikon 20 mm cannon.

Power was from one Atlas 6HM2124 diesel engine, to a Snow and Knobstedt single reduction gear, to a single propeller with 400 shaft horsepower (300 kW), built in Oakland, California or One Enterprise Engine DMG-6 diesel engine with a single propeller with 400 shp.

== Shipyards ==
Many of the APc transport ships were built by small shipyards and boatyards that switched from yacht, sailboat and powerboat building to military construction.

APc transport ships were built in 1942 and 1943 by:

- Nathanael Greene Herreshoff in Bristol, Rhode Island
- Fulton Shipyard in Antioch, California
- Cryer & Sons in Oakland, California
- Warren Boat Yard in Warren, Rhode Island
- Camden Shipbuilding in Camden, Maine
- Hodgdon Yachts in Boothbay, Maine
- Anderson & Cristofani in San Francisco, California
- Lynch Shipbuilding in San Diego, California
- Harry G. Marr in Damariscotta, Maine
- W. A. Robinson, Inc. in Ipswich, Massachusetts
- Bristol Yachts in Seekonk, Massachusetts
- Noank Shipbuilding in Noank, Connecticut

== Notable ships ==
- USS APc-15, built by Camden Ship Building.
- USS APc-21, built by Hodgdon Brothers, sank December 17, 1943 during landing in the Battle of Arawe, was struck by a bomb during an enemy air attack off Arawe, New Britain.
- USS APc-25, built by Fulton Shipyard, renamed Cape Scott then Cape Cross.

== Ships in class ==
APc-80 to APc-84, APc-104 to APc-107, APc-112 to APc-115, APc-99 and APc-100 were canceled before construction started.

List of APc-1-class transports constructed in the US
Name	Shipyard	Commissioned	Notes
APc-1	Herreshoff Mfg	1 Oct 1942	Ex-AMc-164; Sold (delivered) by MC to George Fulton, Fulton Construction Co., Houston, Texas. Merc. COMER PLUMMER 1947.
APc-2	Herreshoff Mfg	31 Oct 1942	Ex-AMc-165; Sold (delivered) by MC to George Danches, St. Louis, Miss. Merc. DANSCO 1951.
APc-3	Herreshoff Mfg	11 Nov 1942	Ex-AMc-166; Sold (delivered) by MC to Foss Launch & Tug Co., Seattle, Wash.
APc-4	Herreshoff Mfg	19 Nov 1942	Ex-AMc-167; Sold in the Philippines to Korea.
APc-5	Herreshoff Mfg	1 Dec 1942	Ex-AMc-168; Sold (delivered) by MC to G. A. Hunter, Eureka, Cal. Merc. Merc. DENNIS GAYLE 1947.
APc-6	Herreshoff Mfg	11 Dec 1942	Ex-AMc-169; Sold in the Philippines to Korea.
APc-7	Herreshoff Mfg	19 Dec 1942	Ex-AMc-196; Sold (delivered) by MC to Foss Launch & Tug Co., Seattle, Wash.
APc-8	Herreshoff Mfg	3 Apr 1943	Ex-AMc-197; Sold (delivered) by MC to Foss Launch & Tug Co., Seattle, Wash.
APc-9	Herreshoff Mfg	30 Mar 1943	Ex-AMc-198; Sold (delivered) by MC to Foss Launch & Tug Co., Seattle, Wash.
APc-10	Herreshoff Mfg	3 Apr 1943	Ex-AMc-199; Sold (delivered) by MC to Harold Hunter, Morro Bay, Cal. Merc. DONNA MAE 1948.
APc-11	Warren Boat	3 Dec 1942	Ex-AMc-180; Sold (awarded) by MC to John Tanzi, San Francisco, Cal. Merc. ISABEL ROSE 1948.
APc-12	Warren Boat	1 Feb 1943	Ex-AMc-181; Sold in Philippines to Korea.
APc-13	Harry G. Marr	9 Dec 1942	Ex-AMc-174; Sold (awarded) by MC to Raymond G. Turner, San Diego, Cal.
APc-14	Harry G. Marr	28 Jan 1943	Ex-AMc-175; Sold (delivered) by MC to Johannes A. Beck, Petersburg, Alaska. Merc. NORTHLAND 1947.
APc-15	Camden SB	27 Oct 1942	Ex-AMc-155; Sold (delivered) by MC to Harold A. Jones, Vancouver, B.C., Canada.
APc-16	Camden SB	15 Jan 1943	Ex-AMc-156; Decomm. at Subic Bay, Philippines. Driven onto beach and bow smashed in typhoon Sep 1946. Wreck sold by FLC, abandoned by buyer.
APc-17	Camden SB	11 Jan 1943	Ex-AMc-157; Recommended for decomm. and sinking in Philippine Area 7 Jan 1946, destroyed there in March.
APc-18	Camden SB	28 Jan 1943	Ex-AMc-158; Sold (delivered) by MC to Frieda Pinckney Scheck, Santa Barbara, Cal.
APc-19	Hodgdon Bros	12 Jan 1943	Ex-AMc-170; Sold (delivered) by MC to Charles E. Kaltenbach, Laguna Beach, Cal.
APc-20	Hodgdon Bros	15 Jan 1943	Ex-AMc-171; Sold (delivered) by MC to Foss Launch & Tug Co., Seattle, Wash. Merc. SEA MONSTER, first registered 1957.
APc-21	Hodgdon Bros	25 Feb 1943	Ex-AMc-172; Sunk by Japanese aircraft bomb off New Britain (Arawe).
APc-22	Hodgdon Bros	15 Mar 1943	Ex-AMc-173; Transferred via MC to Dept. of the Interior. Merc. STORMBIRD 1949, off list 1951.
APc-23	Fulton SY	31 Oct 1942	Ex-AMc-159; Sold (delivered) by MC to Ramon Zuniga, M. San Ysidro, Cal.
APc-24	Fulton SY	5 Nov 1942	Ex-AMc-160; Sold (delivered) by MC to Joseph Campanelli, San Francisco, Cal.
APc-25	Fulton SY	19 Nov 1942	Ex-AMc-161; Sold (delivered) by MC to Bryce Little, Seattle, Wash. Merc. COASTAL TRADER II. 1947, now Cape Scott
APc-26	Fulton SY	25 Nov 1942	Ex-AMc-162; Sold (delivered) by MC to G. M. Lindsay, Vancouver, B.C., Canada.
APc-27	Fulton SY	5 Dec 1942	Ex-AMc-163; Sold (delivered) by MC to Frank Leslie Fulton, Antioch, Cal.
APc-28	Fulton SY	17 Dec 1942	Ex-AMc-182; Driven hard aground by typhoon at Okinawa. Destroyed by burning 9 Mar 1946.
APc-29	Fulton SY	6 Jan 1943	Ex-AMc-183; Sold (delivered) by MC to A. S. Thompson, Seattle, Wash. Merc. NUISANCE IV 1947.
APc-30	Fulton SY	15 Jan 1943	Ex-AMc-184; Sold (delivered) by MC to Charlie E. Steel, Las Vegas, Nev.
APc-31	Fulton SY	30 Jan 1943	Ex-AMc-185; Sold (delivered) by MC to Anderson & Cristofani SB & Marine Railway, San Francisco, Cal.
APc-32	Fulton SY	13 Feb 1943	Ex-AMc-186; Sold (delivered) by MC to H. L. Coville, West Vancouver, B.C., Canada.
APc-33	Anderson & Cristofani	31 Oct 1942	Ex-AMc-150; Sold (delivered) by MC to William S. Kisich, c/o Sanvernmo (?) Co., San Francisco, Cal.
APc-34	Anderson & Cristofani	19 Nov 1942	Ex-AMc-151; Sold (awarded) by MC to Cia. Commercial S. de R.L. de C.V., Guaymas, Sonora, Mexico.
APc-35	Anderson & Cristofani	2 Dec 1942	Ex-AMc-152; Grounded off New Georgia, beached and abandoned.
APc-36	Anderson & Cristofani	18 Dec 1942	Ex-AMc-153; Sold (awarded) by MC to Fred Cook, Aransas Pass, Texas.
APc-37	Anderson & Cristofani	11 Jan 1943	Ex-AMc-154; Sold (delivered) by MC, buyer's name not recorded.
APc-38	Anderson & Cristofani	29 Jan 1943	Ex-AMc-193; Sold (delivered) by MC to James Mastrogeorge, Pittsburgh, Pa.
APc-39	Anderson & Cristofani	17 Feb 1943	Ex-AMc-194; Sold (delivered) by MC to Rupert Fish Co. Inc. c/o Messrs. Jones & Bronson, Seattle, Wash.
APc-40	Anderson & Cristofani	8 Mar 1943	Ex-AMc-195; Sold (awarded) by MC to Lawrence W. Koerner, San Francisco, Cal.
APc-41	Cryer & Sons	10 Feb 1943	Ex-AMc-176; Earlier order: Snow SY (19 Feb 1942). Sold (delivered) by MC to F. A. Wandtke, Mill Valley, Cal. Merc. FRANCES ANN 1948.
APc-42	Cryer & Sons	10 Mar 1943	Ex-AMc-177; Earlier order: Snow SY (19 Feb 1942). Sold (delivered) by MC to Donald S. Morgan, Long Beach, Cal. Merc. DONNA M 1948, off list 1954.
APc-43	Cryer & Sons	20 Apr 1943	Ex-AMc-178; Earlier order: Snow SY (19 Feb 1942). Sold (delivered) by MC to Empacadora del Pacifico, Ensenada, Mexico.
APc-44	Cryer & Sons	18 May 1943	Ex-AMc-179; Earlier order: Snow SY (19 Feb 1942). Sold (delivered) by MC to Silvano Perez Ramos, Nogales, Sonora, Mexico.
APc-45	Lynch SB	5 Jan 1943	Ex-AMc-187; Sold (delivered) by MC to Ernest W. Rideout, San Jose, Cal. Merc. HALAWI 1949.
APc-46	Lynch SB	11 Feb 1943	Ex-AMc-188; Sold (awarded) by MC to John P. Stoloroll & Homer I. Salley, San Francisco, Cal. Merc. RETRIEVER 1951.
APc-47	Lynch SB	25 Feb 1943	Ex-AMc-189; Sold (delivered) by MC to Cdr. Arthur A. Anderson, Sacramento, Cal.
APc-48	Lynch SB	21 Apr 1943	Ex-AMc-190; Sold (delivered) by MC to William S. Cady & Kimball Allen, San Francisco, Cal. Merc. ALLEN CODY 1948.
APc-49	Lynch SB	19 May 1943	Ex-AMc-191; Grounded 30 Jul 1945 near Pearl Harbor, hulk seems to have been brought to Pearl where decomm. and stk. Jan 1946. Sold at Pearl as salvage to a Honolulu buyer.
APc-50	Lynch SB	9 Jun 1943	Ex-AMc-192; Sold (awarded) by MC to Kennydale Shipyard, Kennydale, Wash.
APc-51	Warren Boat	—	Trf. to UK under Lend Lease as FT-1. Returned 10 Dec 1946, sold by FLC Apr 1947 at Malta to Greek Govt.
APc-52	Warren Boat	—	Trf. to UK under Lend Lease as FT-2. Returned 8 Jan 1947, sold by FLC 8 Jan 1947 to Greek firm.
APc-53	Warren Boat	—	Trf. to UK under Lend Lease as FT-3. Returned 28 Aug 1946, sold by FLC Apr 1947 at Malta to Greek Govt.
APc-54	Warren Boat	—	Trf. to UK under Lend Lease as FT-4. Declared total loss 1 Apr 1946 (inoperable at Colombo, Ceylon, beached to prevent sinking).
APc-55	Harry G. Marr	10 Dec 191942 (launched)	Trf. to UK under Lend Lease as FT-5. Renamed TENDERFOOT 1944. Arrived at Norfolk from Malta under British flag 6 Jul 1946, decomm. (U.K.) and returned 27 Jul 1946. Sold (delivered) by MC at Norfolk to Bristol Yacht Building Co., South Bristol, Maine. Merc. EAGLE 1947.
APc-56	Harry G. Marr	—	Trf. to UK under Lend Lease as FT-6. Returned 28 Aug 1946, sold by FLC Apr 1947 at Malta to Greek Govt.
APc-57	Harry G. Marr	—	Trf. to UK under Lend Lease as FT-20. Loaned by Royal Navy to War Office as EL ALAMEIN, used in the Caribbean. Returned 15 Apr 1950 at Key West, expended as experimental gunnery target off Norfolk 8 Aug 1950.
APc-58	Camden SB	Jan 1943 (completed)	Trf. to UK under Lend Lease as FT-7. Became repair ship ASTRAVAL 1944. Returned 10 Dec 1946, sold by FLC Apr 1947 at Malta to Greek Govt.
APc-59	Camden SB	—	Trf. to UK under Lend Lease as FT-8. Returned 24 May 1948, sold by FLC as of 1 May 1948.
APc-60	Camden SB	—	Trf. to UK under Lend Lease as FT-9. Returned 10 Dec 1946, sold by FLC Nov 1946.
APc-61	Camden SB	—	Trf. to UK under Lend Lease as FT-10. Returned 10 Dec 1946, sold by FLC Nov 1946.
APc-62	Camden SB	8 Feb 191943 (launched)	Trf. to UK under Lend Lease as FT-21. Returned 28 Aug 1946, sold Apr 1947 by FLC at Malta to Greek Govt.
APc-63	Camden SB	—	Trf. to UK under Lend Lease as FT-22. Returned Jun 1946, sold 12 Apr 1947 by FLC at Malta to Greece.
APc-64	Camden SB	July 1943 (completed)	Trf. to UK under Lend Lease as FT-23. Arrived at Norfolk from Malta under British flag 9 Aug 1946, decomm. (U.K.) and returned 15 Aug 1946. Sold (delivered) by MC to Dominic V. Wise & Mark J. Wise, Philadelphia, Pa.
APc-65	Hodgdon Bros	—	Trf. to UK under Lend Lease as FT-11. Returned 12 Aug 1944 and trf. to Greece under Lend Lease same date as VELESTINON. Returned and given to Greece under MDAP 22 Jul 1952. Sold 1964.
APc-66	Hodgdon Bros	—	Trf. to UK under Lend Lease as FT-12. Returned 12 Aug 1944 and trf. to Greece under Lend Lease same date as ELASSON. Returned and given to Greece under MDAP 22 Jul 1952. Sold 1963.
APc-67	Hodgdon Bros	2 Aug 1943	Scheduled for transfer to UK under Lend Lease as FT-24 but retained by US for transfer to Greece. Trf. to Greece under Lend Lease as LECHOVON. Returned and given to Greece under MDAP 22 Jul 1952. Sold 1964.
APc-68	Hodgdon Bros	—	Trf. to UK under Lend Lease as FT-25. Arrived at Norfolk from Malta under British flag 9 Aug 1946, decomm. (U.K.) and returned 15 Aug 1946. Sold (delivered) by MC to Adam P. Smith, New Orleans, La. Merc. ORO LOBO 1947, off list 1952/53.
APc-69	Hodgdon Bros	—	Trf. to UK under Lend Lease as FT-26. Loaned by Royal Navy to War Office as CANANIA. Returned 5 Apr 1950 at Key West, expended as an experimental gunnery target off Norfolk 16 Aug 1950.
APc-70	Hodgdon Bros	—	Trf. to UK under Lend Lease as FT-27. Returned 10 Dec 1946, sold by FLC Nov 1946.
APc-71	Bristol Yacht	—	Trf. to UK under Lend Lease as FT-13. Returned 12 Aug 1944 and trf. to Greece under Lend Lease same date as KALAVRYTA. Returned and given to Greece under MDAP 22 Jul 1952. Sold 1963.
APc-72	Bristol Yacht	—	Trf. to UK under Lend Lease as FT-14. Returned 29 May 1946 at Subic Bay, destroyed by sinking 5 Aug 1946.
APc-73	Bristol Yacht	6 Aug 1943	Scheduled for transfer to UK under Lend Lease as FT-28 but retained by U.S. for transfer to Greece. Trf. to Greece under Lend Lease as ANCHIALOS. Returned and given to Greece under MDAP 22 Jul 1952. Sold circa 1963.
APc-74	Bristol Yacht	—	Trf. to UK under Lend Lease as FT-29. Arrived at Norfolk from Malta under British flag 6 Jul 1946, decomm. (U.K.) and returned 27 Jul 1946. Sold (delivered) by MC to J. R. Lawson & C. L. Lawson, Hampton, Va.
APc-75	W. A. Robinson	26 Jul 1943	Scheduled for transfer to UK under Lend Lease as FT-15 but retained by U.S. for transfer to Greece. Trf. to Greece under Lend Lease as DISTOMON. Returned and given to Greece under MDAP 22 Jul 1952. Sold 1963.
APc-76	W. A. Robinson	—	Trf. to UK under Lend Lease as FT-16. Renamed TENDERHEART 1944. Arrived at Norfolk from Malta under British flag 6 Jul 1946, decomm. (U.K.) and returned 27 Jul 1946. Sold (delivered) by MC to J. R. Lawson, Hampton, Va.
APc-77	W. A. Robinson	—	Trf. to UK under Lend Lease as FT-17. Returned 28 Aug 1946, sold by FLC Apr 1947 at Malta to Greek Govt.
APc-78	W. A. Robinson	—	Trf. to UK under Lend Lease as FT-18. Returned 1 Jun 1946 at Subic Bay, sold by FLC 21 Oct 1947.
APc-79	W. A. Robinson	—	Trf. to UK under Lend Lease as FT-19. Arrived at Norfolk from Malta under British flag 6 Jul 1946, decomm. (U.K.) and returned 27 Jul 1946. Sold (delivered) by MC to D. J. Hennessy, New Orleans, La. Merc. ORO ZORRA 1947, off list 1951.
APc-85	Herreshoff Mfg	28 Apr 1943	Trf. to Ecuador under Lend Lease as CINCO DE JUNIO. USN decomm. est. Returned and sold by FLC to Ecuador 13 May 1949. Renamed EL ORO ca. 1951, stk. 1961 and scrapped.
APc-86	Herreshoff Mfg	20 Apr 1943	Decommissioned and placed in service 12 Feb 1944 at Bermuda. Out of service in reserve 28 Oct 1949. In USN reserve 1949-55
APc-87	Herreshoff Mfg	7 Jun 1943	Decommissioned and placed in service 11 Feb 1944, recomm. 27 Mar 1945 for use at Guantanamo Bay. Converted to personnel ferry late 1945, in service 28 Jun 1946 in boat pool at Casco Bay, Maine. Grounded and flooded in bad weather while under tow by LUISENO (ATF-156) at New London, Conn., out of service for disposal 16 Apr 1947. Sold (delivered) by MC to Berkley L. & H. G. Simpson, Beaufort, N.C.
APc-88	Herreshoff Mfg	21 Jun 1943	Decommissioned and placed in service 22 Mar 1944. Recomm. 3 May 1945 for use at Guantanamo Bay. Converted to personnel ferry late 1945, in service 28 Jun 1946 in boat pool at Casco Bay, Maine, out of service in reserve 28 Oct 1949. In USN reserve 1949-57.
APc-89	Herreshoff Mfg	14 Jun 1943	Decommissioned and placed in service 14 Feb 1944 at Bermuda. Assigned 19 Jun 1946 to Fleet Camera Party in Tenth Naval District. To Norfolk for disposal ca. Feb 1948. Sold at Norfolk, delivered to buyer prior 11 Sep 1949. Merc. BEAR (research vessel?) 1951, off list 1952-53.
APc-90	Herreshoff Mfg	31 May 1943	Decommissioned and placed in service 11 Feb 1944. Assigned to boat pool duty on the east coast, possibly at Casco Bay, Maine, 19 Jun 1946. Out of service for disposal 17 May 1949. Sold at Norfolk, delivered to buyer 9 Sep 1949. Merc. JOHN J. NAGLE 1952/53.
APc-91	Herreshoff Mfg	22 May 1943	Decommissioned and placed in service 16 Feb 1944 at Bermuda. Converted to personnel ferry late 1945. Assigned to boat pool duty in Narragansett Bay on 3 Dec 1945 and 19 Jun 1946. Out of service in reserve 28 Oct 1949. In USN reserve 1949-57.
APc-92	Herreshoff Mfg	15 May 1943	Decommissioned and placed in service 18 Feb 1944 at Bermuda. Assigned to boat pool duty on the east coast, possibly at Casco Bay, Maine, 19 Jun 1946, reassigned to Bermuda 11 Jul 1947. Out of service in reserve at Charleston, S.C., ca. 17 Apr 1950. Sold under MDAP to Haiti 1952 as VERTIERES. Later lost.
APc-93	Herreshoff Mfg	28 Jun 1943	Decommissioned and placed in service 19 Feb 1944 at Bermuda. Assigned to boat pool duty on the east coast, possibly at Casco Bay, Maine, 19 Jun 1946 reassigned to Bermuda 11 Jul 1947. Out of service in reserve at Charleston, S.C., ca. 7 May 1950.
APc-94	Herreshoff Mfg	7 Jul 1943	Ordered retained in full comm. 28 Mar 1944. Converted to personnel ferry late 1945. Assigned to boat pool duty on the east coast 19 Jun 1946, possibly at Casco Bay, Maine, decomm. and placed in service 9 Jul 1946. Out of service in reserve at Charleston, S.C., 28 Oct 1949. In USN reserve 1949-57.
APc-95	Herreshoff Mfg	15 Jul 1943	Sold (delivered) by MC to Maurice C. Reaber, Seattle, Wash. Merc. CORAL SEA 1948, off list 1960.
APc-96	Herreshoff Mfg	28 Jul 1943	Sold (delivered) by MC to George Andrew Hill, San Diego, Cal.
APc-97	Noank SB	—	Trf. to UK under Lend Lease as FT-30. Returned 28 Aug 1946, sold by FLC Apr 1947 at Malta to Greek Govt.
APc-98	Noank SB	18 Dec 1943	Sold (delivered) by MC to Hugh Allan Rideout, San Jose, Cal. Merc. E. V. RIDEOUT 1948, off list 1950.
APc-101	Fulton SY	2 Apr 1943	Renumbered from APc-75, 25 Aug 1942. Sold (delivered) by MC to Rupert M. Thomas, Seattle, Wash. Merc. KLEHOWA 1947.
APc-102	Fulton SY	16 Apr 1943	Renumbered from APc-76, 25 Aug 1942. Beached at Saipan during hurricane 5 Oct 1945. Declared destroyed as of decomm. date of 6 Feb 1946.
APc-103	Fulton SY	1 May 1943	Renumbered from APc-77, 25 Aug 1942. Aground during typhoon at Buckner Bay, Okinawa. Wreck destroyed by burning 12 Dec 1945.
APc-108	Anderson & Cristofani	1 May 1943	Renumbered from APc-82, 25 Aug 1942. Sold (delivered) by MC to Andreas Wikan, Seattle, Wash. Merc. ICELAND 1947.
APc-109	Anderson & Cristofani	5 Jun 1943	Renumbered from APc-83, 25 Aug 1942. Sold (delivered) by MC to Marine Products Co., San Diego, Cal.
APc-110	Anderson & Cristofani	3 Jul 1943	Renumbered from APc-84, 25 Aug 1942. Sold (delivered) by MC to William H. Novales, San Francisco, Cal. Merc. SURPRISE 1951.
APc-111	Anderson & Cristofani	31 Jul 1943	Renumbered from APc-85, 25 Aug 1942. Sold (delivered) by MC to Lawrence A. J. Hansen, Seattle, Wash. Merc. COASTAL TRADER 1947, off list 1951.

== See also ==
- Wooden boats of World War 2
