= Fulton Shipyard =

Shipyard in Antioch, California, United States

Coordinates: 38.014720°N 121.79911°W

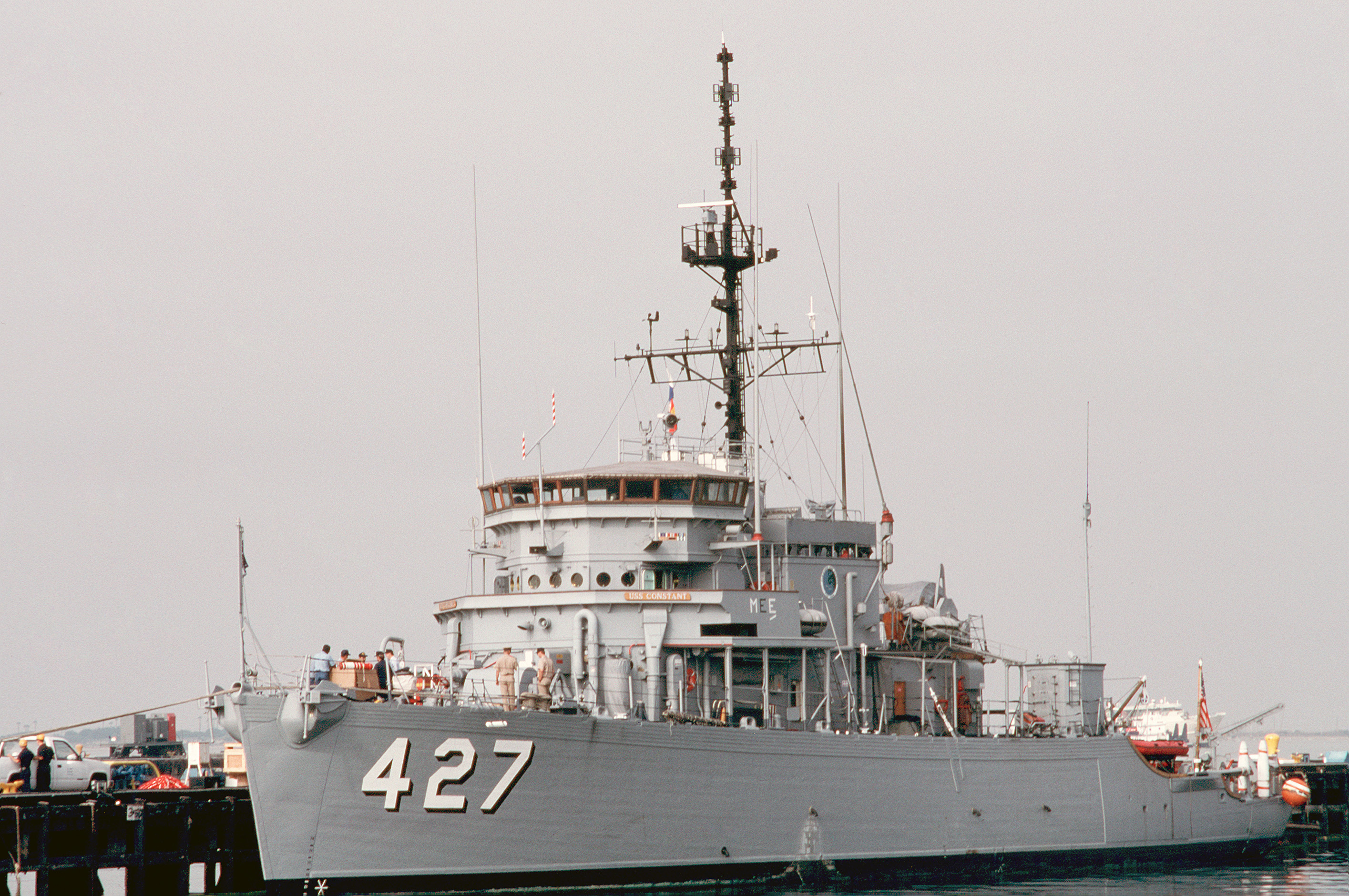
Fulton Shipyard built Aggressive-class minesweeper, USS Constant

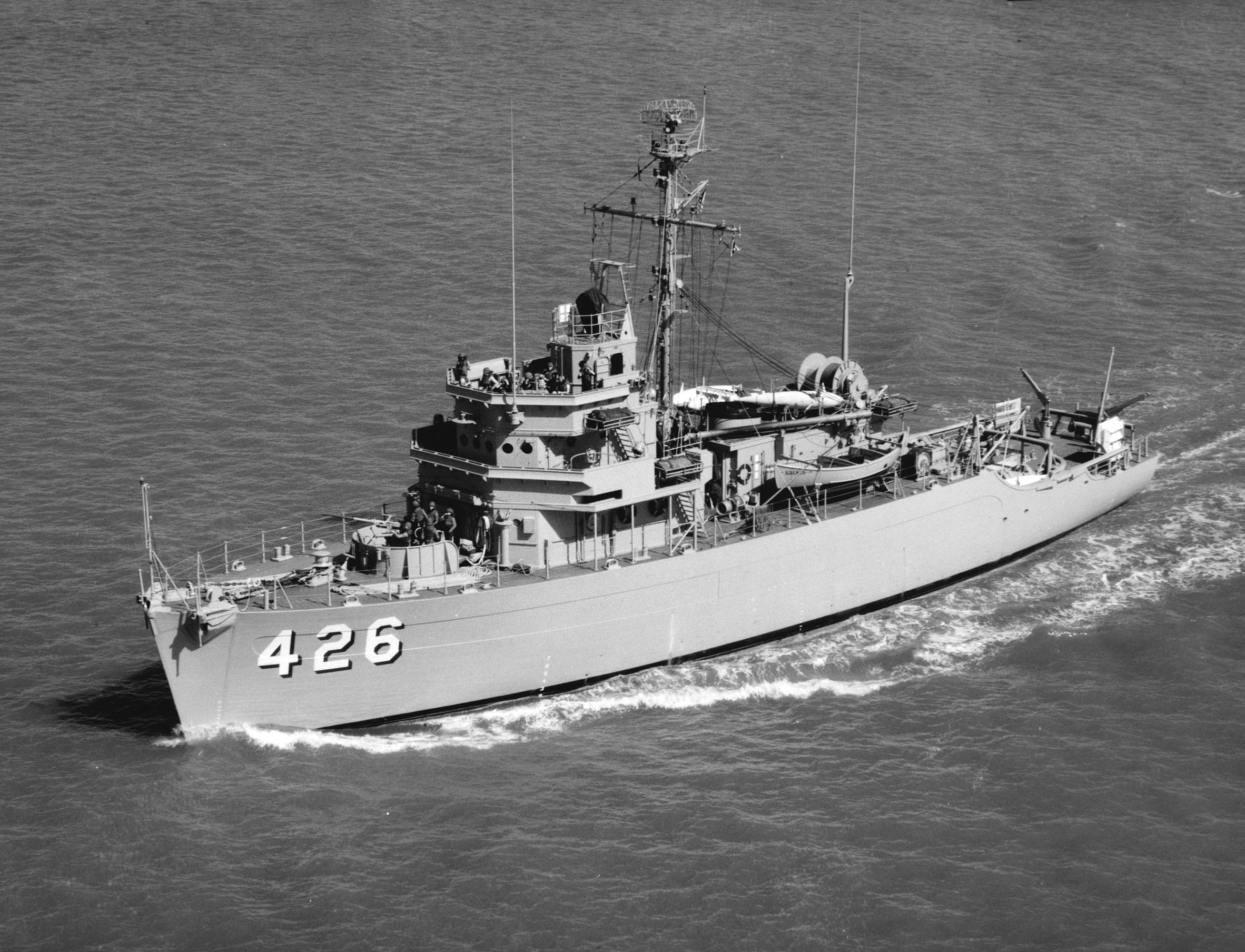
Fulton Shipyard built Aggressive-class minesweeper, USS Conflict

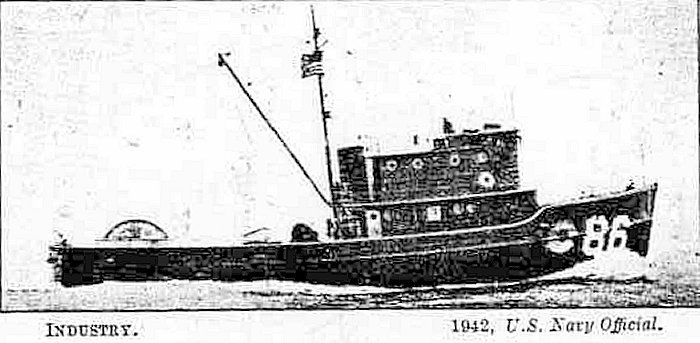
Fulton Shipyard built Accentor-class minesweeper USS Industry

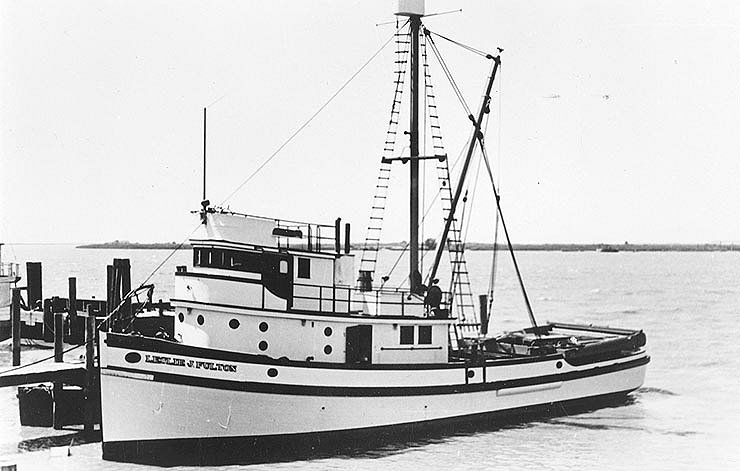
Fulton Shipyard built USS Waxbill

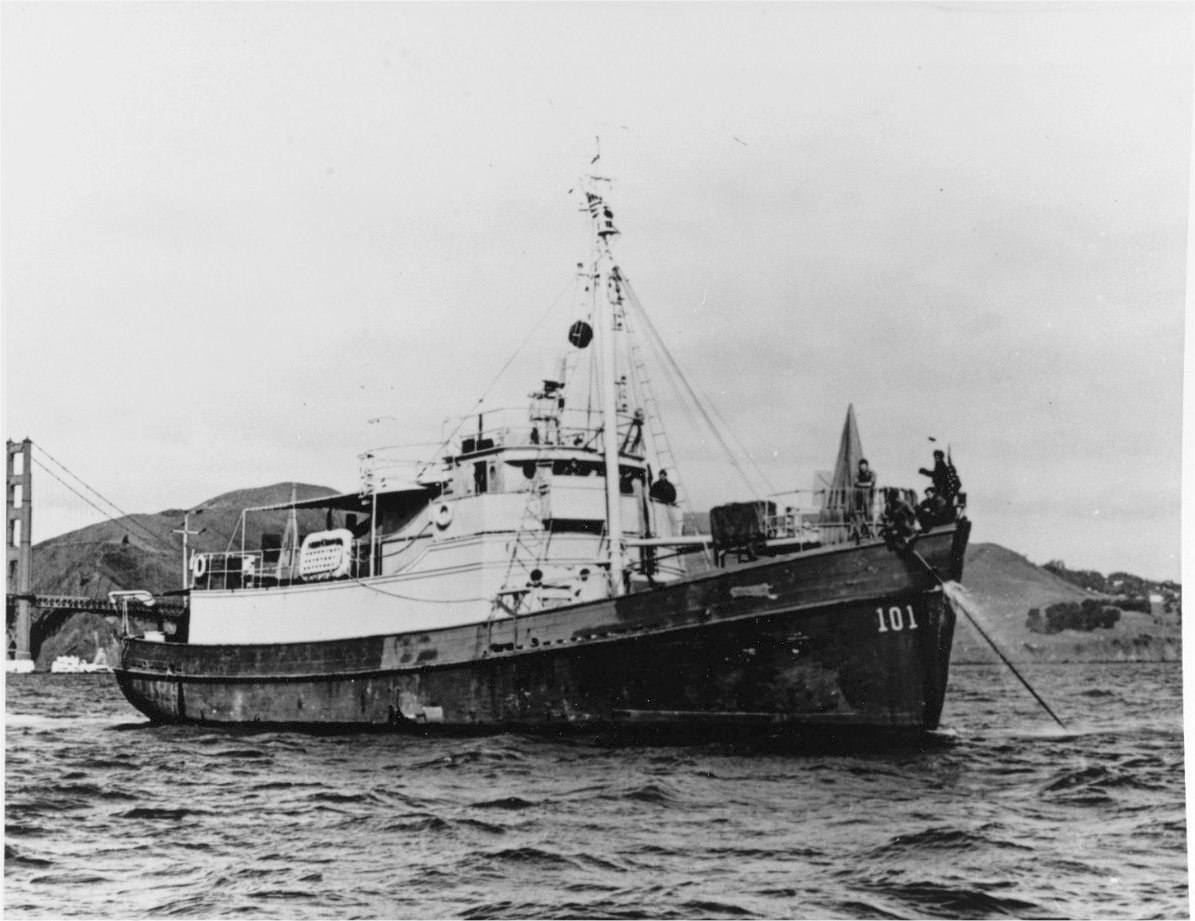
The small coastal troop transport constructed by Fulton Shipyard, APc-101

Fulton Shipyard was a shipbuilding company in Antioch, California. The shipyard was founded in 1924 by Frank Fulton and Angeline Fulton Fredericks. To support the World War II demand for ships, Fulton Shipyard built minesweepers, tugboats, and troopships. The shipyard was located on the Stockton Channel at 701 Fulton Shipyard Rd, Antioch, near Antioch pier and the Antioch Dunes National Wildlife Refuge. The site was the former Jarvis Brothers, opened in 1918, then Laurtzen shipyard. In 1977 the site became the California Corporation. The shipyard closed in 1999 and the land is owned by the Fulton Family Trust. Fulton Shipyard was on the San Joaquin River and an inland port located more than seventy nautical miles (130 km; 81 mi) from the ocean, emptying into Suisun Bay. Fulton Shipyard was featured in a 1914 movie called The Stolen Yacht, a short drama film released on November 5, 1914. Frank Fulton and Angeline's son James Lloyd Fulton (August 7, 1928 – August 25, 2011) became an operator of a Fulton Shipyard tugboat.

== ATR-1 class rescue tug ==
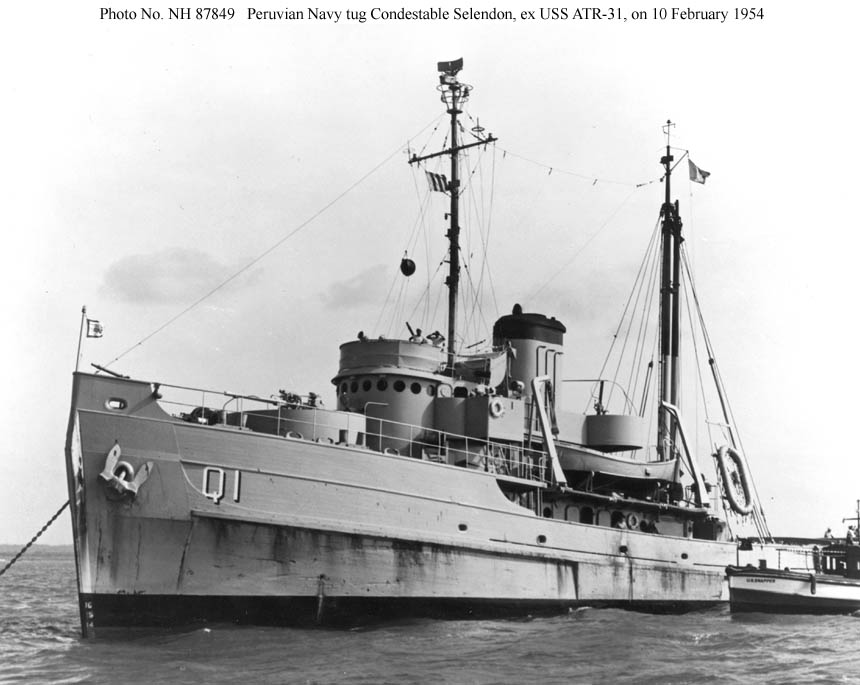
USS ATR-31, an ATR-1-class rescue tug

ATR-1 class - ATR is the US hull classification symbol meaning Auxiliary Tug Rescue. The ATR-1 class was a Type V wooden-hulled rescue tug built by Fulton Shipyard in 1944 and 1945. The ATR-1 tugs serviced World War II in both Asiatic-Pacific Theater and the European theatre of World War II. The 40 ATR-1-class vessels had a displacement of 852 tons light and 1,315 tons fully loaded. They had a length of 165 feet 6 inches (50.44 m), a beam of 33 feet 4 inches (10.16 m) and a draft of 15 feet 6 inches (4.72 m). The tugs had a top speed of 12.2 knots (22.6 km/h; 14.0 mph). The largest boom had a capacity of 4 tons. They were armed with one 3"/50 caliber gun and two single Oerlikon 20 mm cannon. The crew had five officers and 47 enlisted men. They had a fuel capacity of 1,620 barrels (68,000 US gal). The propulsion was one Fulton Iron Works vertical triple-expansion reciprocating steam engine with two Babcock & Wilcox "D"-type boilers with a single propeller creating 1,600 shaft horsepower (1,200 kW). They had two turbo drive Ships Service Generators, rated at 60 kW 120 V D.C. An example is USS ATR-31.

== Small coastal transport ==
Fulton Shipyard built troopships of the APc-1-class small coastal transports design. The ship had a displacement of 100 tons light, 258 tons fully loaded with a length of 103 feet (31 m), a beam of 21 feet (6.4 m), a draft of 9 feet (2.7 m), and a top speed of 10 knots (19 km/h; 12 mph). The crew was composed of 3 officers and 22 enlisted men and could transport up to 66 troops. The vessels had a large boom with a capacity of 3 tons. They were armed with four single 20 mm AA guns. the APc-1 class had a fuel capacity of 145 barrels (6,100 US gal) of diesel fuel. They were powered by one Enterprise Engine DMG-6 diesel engine with a single propeller creating 400 shp (300 kW). For electrical they had two diesel 30 kW 120V D.C. service generators. The ship moved troops in the Pacific War. A notable ship was USS APc-25.

== Accentor-class minesweeper ==
Fulton Shipyard built Accentor-class minesweepers, with a displacement of 185–205 long tons (188–208 t), a length of 97 ft 1 in (29.59 m)–98 ft 5 in (30.00 m), a beam of 21 ft (6.4 m)–23 ft 7 in (7.19 m), and a draft of 8 ft 11 in (2.72 m)–10 ft 8 in (3.25 m). The minesweepers were powered by a diesel engine with 400 hp (300 kW) and a top speed of 10 knots (19 km/h; 12 mph). A crew of 17 manned the ship and deck guns. Armament was a two .50 cal. M2 Browning machine guns. Accentor-class minesweepers were used to sweep naval mines in harbors, bays, and other littoral waters, due to their small size. Notable ships: USS Industry, USS Liberator, USS Loyalty, USS Memorable, USS Merit and USS Observer.

== Agile-class minesweeper ==
Fulton Shipyard built Agile-class minesweepers with a displacement of 853 tons full, a length of 172 ft (52 m), a beam of 35 ft (11 m), and a draft of 10 ft (3.0 m). The vessels were powered by four Packard ID1700 diesel engines, with 2,280 brake horsepower (1,700 kW) and two controllable pitch propellers. The ships had a top speed of 14 knots (26 km/h; 16 mph). The ship crew was 7 officers and 70 enlisted men. The minesweepers were armed with one Bofors 40 mm gun and two .50 cal (12.7 mm) twin machine gun. Notable ships: USS Conflict and USS Constant.

== Notable incidents ==
- USS Industry ran aground in a typhoon and sank on October 9, 1945 in Nakagusuku Bay, Okinawa.
- USS Loyalty grounded and destroyed on January 12, 1946 near Okinawa.
- The troopship APc-28 ran aground and burnt off Okinawa in 1946
- APc-102 was beached and lost at Saipan in 1945
- APc-103 was grounded and destroyed on December 2, 1945 off Okinawa in Nakagusuku Bay.

== See also ==
- California during World War II
- Maritime history of California
- Wooden boats of World War 2
- Cryer & Sons
