= Cryer & Sons =

Shipyard in Newport Beach, California, United States

Coordinates: 37.778897°N 122.24310°W

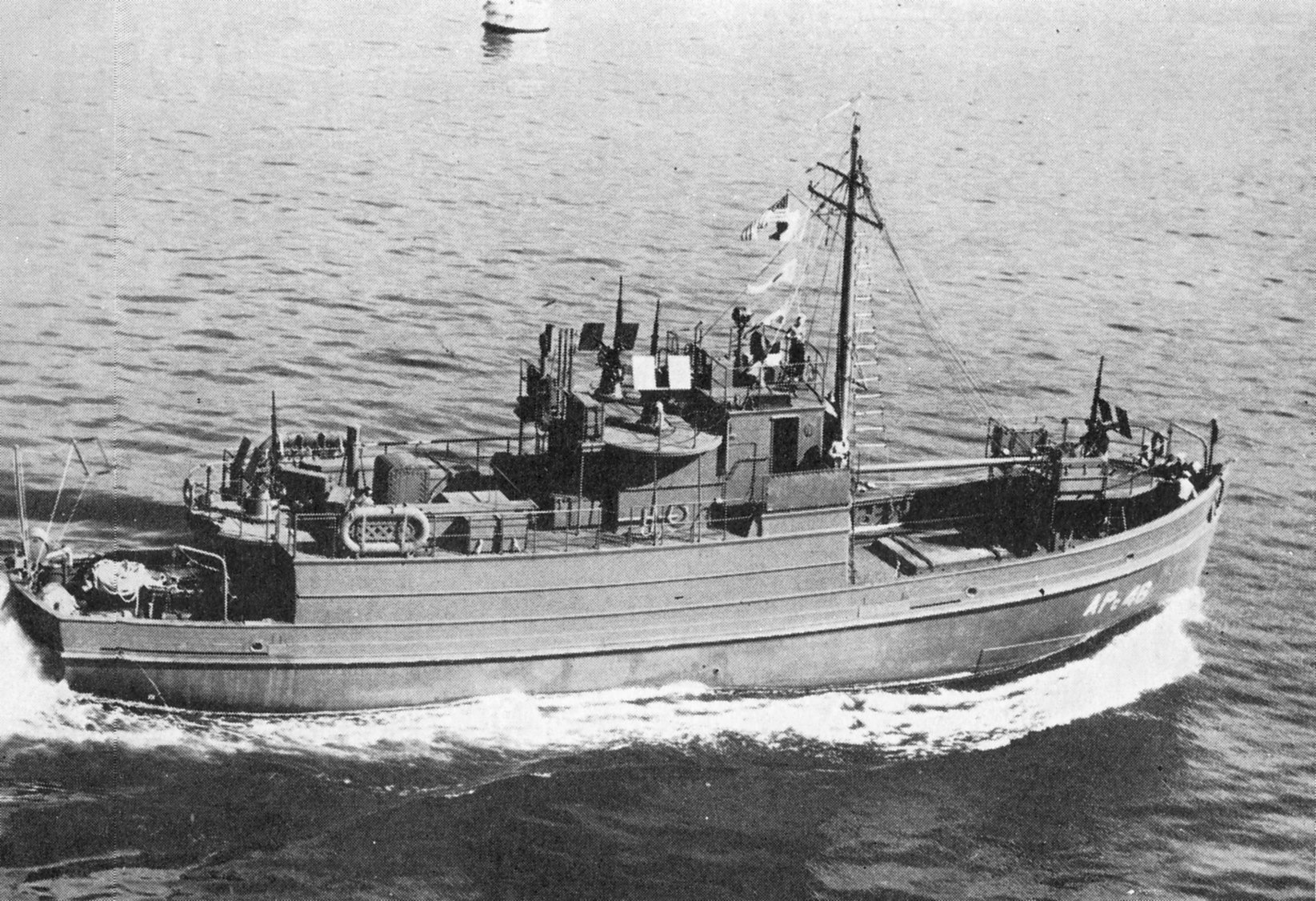
US Navy APc-1 Class Small Coastal Transport

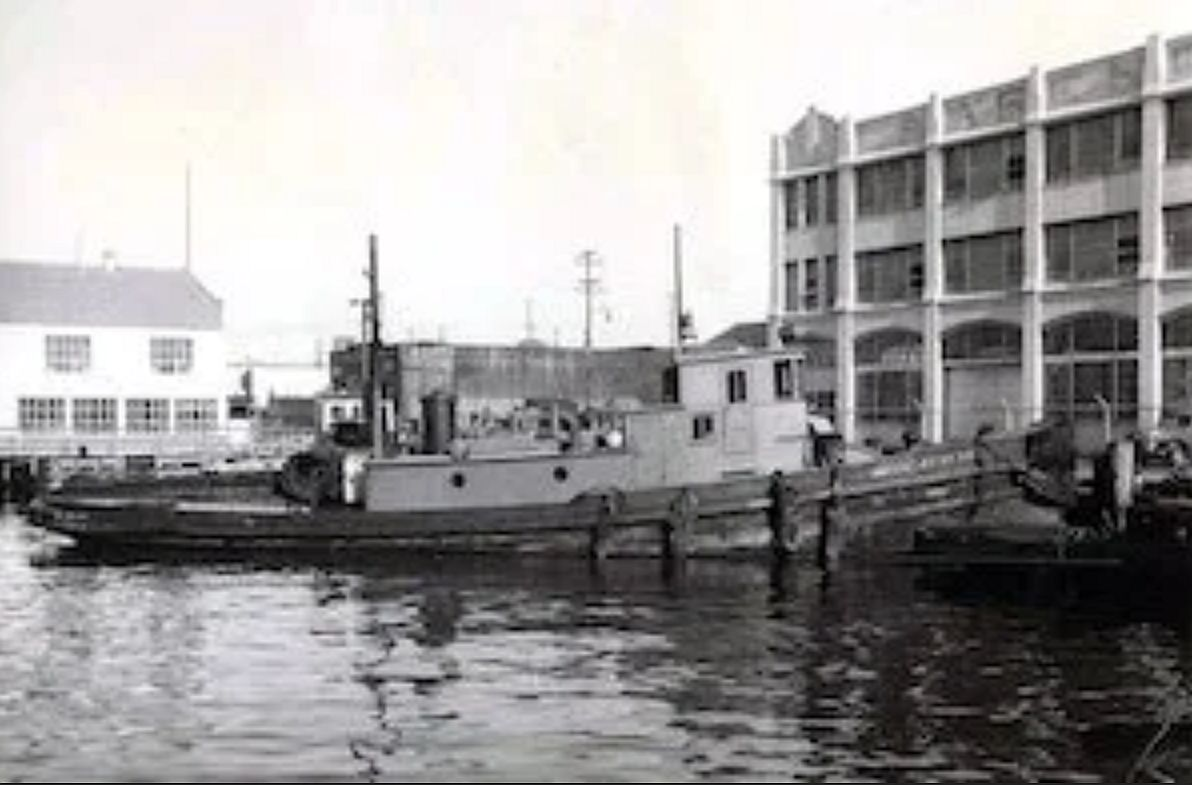
Thomas Crowley tugboat in 1923 built by William Cryer

Cryer & Sons or Cryer Boatworks was a wooden shipbuilding company in Oakland, California. To support the World War 2 demand for ships Cryer & Sons Company shipyard switched over to military construction and built: US Navy APC coastal transports. Cryer & Sons was started in 1907 by William Cryer, a migrant from England, in San Francisco. William Cryer first boatyard was started 1890s. Cryer & Sons boatyard first boat opened in 1907 was located at 11th Avenue, Oakland. In 1912 he move the boatyard to 1890 Dennison Street Street, Oakland at the corner of Embarcadero. The boatyard was owned and run by William Cryer's son William James Cryer, and later by his grandsons William J, Cryer III and Robert R. Cryer. Cryer & Sons built and repaired wooden powerboats and began working on steel-hulled boats in the 1960s. Many of the boats built used engines from Atlas Gas Engine Company or Standard Gas Engine Company. There is a historical marker at 2301 Embarcadero, Oakland in Union Point Park, just south of the Coast Guard Island bridge near the waterfront remains. The current site has been vacant since 1989. The main building was heavily damaged in a fire on the morning of November 13, 2020. The Cryer & Sons is and has been a site of contamination after decades of sandblasting and replacing hull bottom paint. Some of the contaminated soil has been removed. Some of the land reclaimed has been used for the northern park of Union Point Park. This work has been done with the owners of the land, Measure DD, the city and the Port of Oakland. The City of Oakland had hoped to update the main Cryer & Sons building to use as a community center, but fire damage has ended that hope.

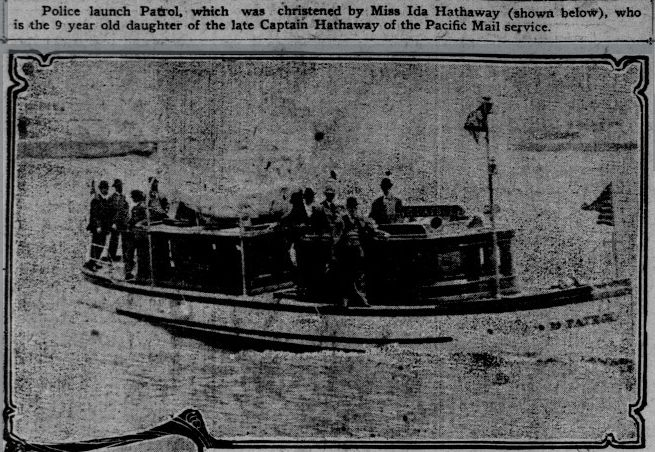
On 26 May 1908 9-year-old Miss Ida Hathaway in San Francisco Christen the 50-foot Police patrol boat built by William Cryer at Cryer Boatworks. Ida Hathaway is the daughter of Captain Hathaway with the Pacific Mail Steamship Company

Notable ships:

- Small, coastal transports for the US Navy.
- 40 launches and Cannery tenders for the Alaska Packers' Association.
- The Black Swan a 130-foot yacht for Oakland automaker William C. Durant of Durant Motors.
- Concrete hulled 63-foot sailboat for Mayor John H. Reading in 1974.
- Thomas Crowley's Crowley Maritime tugboats
- Police patrol boat, like the 1908 San Francisco 50x10 Police patrol launch boat.

== Small coastal transport ==
Cryer & Sons built troopships of the APc-1-class small coastal transports design. The ship had a displacement of 100 tons light, 258 tons fully loaded with a length of 103 feet (31 m), a beam of 21 feet (6.4 m), a draft of 9 feet (2.7 m), and a top speed of 10 knots (19 km/h; 12 mph). The crew was composed of 3 officers and 22 enlisted men and could transport up to 66 troops. The vessels had a large boom with a capacity of 3 tons. They were armed with four single 20 mm AA guns. the APc-1 class had a fuel capacity of 145 barrels (6,100 US gal) of diesel fuel. They were powered by one Atlas engine 6HM2124 diesel engine with a single propeller creating 400 shp (300 kW). For electrical they had two diesel 30 kW 120V D.C. service generators. The ship moved troops in the Pacific War. A notable ship was USS APc-25.

Ship ID.	Original Name or #	Original Owner	Ship Type	Tons	Feet	Delivery	Notes
255456	AMc 176 / APc 41	US Navy	Coastal Transport	100	147	10 Feb 1943	Sold in 1947 renamed Frances Ann
255445	AMc 177 / APc 42	US Navy	Coastal Transport	100	147	10 March 1943	Sold in 1947 renamed Donna M
	AMc 178 / APc 43	US Navy	Coastal Transport	100	147	20 April 1943	To MARAD in 1947
	AMc 179 / APc 44	US Navy	Coastal Transport	100	147	18 May 1943	To MARAD in 1947

== Refounding ==
In 2025 the company was restarted as Cryer Boatworks, still in the San Francisco Bay area, as a specialist firm focused on optionally manned and autonomous watercraft. The founder, Brett Cryer, is the great great grandson of the original William Cryer, and the fifth consecutive generation boatbuilder in the Cryer family.

== See also ==
- Wooden boats of World War 2
