= USS Merit =

Minesweeper of the United States Navy

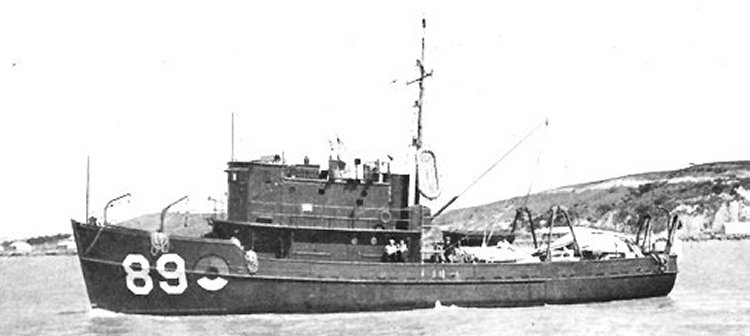
- Accentor-class minesweeper, sister ship Memorable

History

United States
- Builder: Fulton Shipyard
- Laid down: 15 August 1941
- Launched: 4 January 1942
- In service: 28 March 1942
- Out of service: 10 December 1945
- Stricken: 8 May 1946
- Fate: transferred to the U.S. Fish and Wild Life Service

General characteristics
- Displacement: 173 tons
- Length: 97 ft (30 m)
- Beam: 22 ft (6.7 m)
- Draft: 9 ft (2.7 m)
- Speed: 10 knots
- Complement: 17
- Armament: Two machine guns

USS Merit (AMc-90) was an Accentor-class coastal minesweeper acquired by the U.S. Navy for the dangerous task of removing mines from minefields laid in the water to prevent ships from passing.

Merit was laid down 15 August 1941 by Fulton Shipyard, Antioch, California; launched 4 January 1942; sponsored by Mrs. Walter H. Eels; and placed in service 28 March 1942.

== World War II service ==
After shakedown along the coast of California, the new coastal minesweeper was assigned to the Western Sea Frontier force. Transferred 16 March 1943 to Naval Local Defense Force, 12th Naval District, she continued her sweeps and patrols to protect San Francisco Harbor as a major departure point for men and materials to the Pacific fighting fronts.

== Post-war inactivation and disposal ==
Regarded as surplus following V-J Day, she was placed out of service 10 December 1945 and struck from the Navy list 8 May 1946. Eight months later Merit transferred to the U.S. Fish and Wild Life Service.
