= USS APc-21 =

Small coastal transport vessel used by the United States in WW2

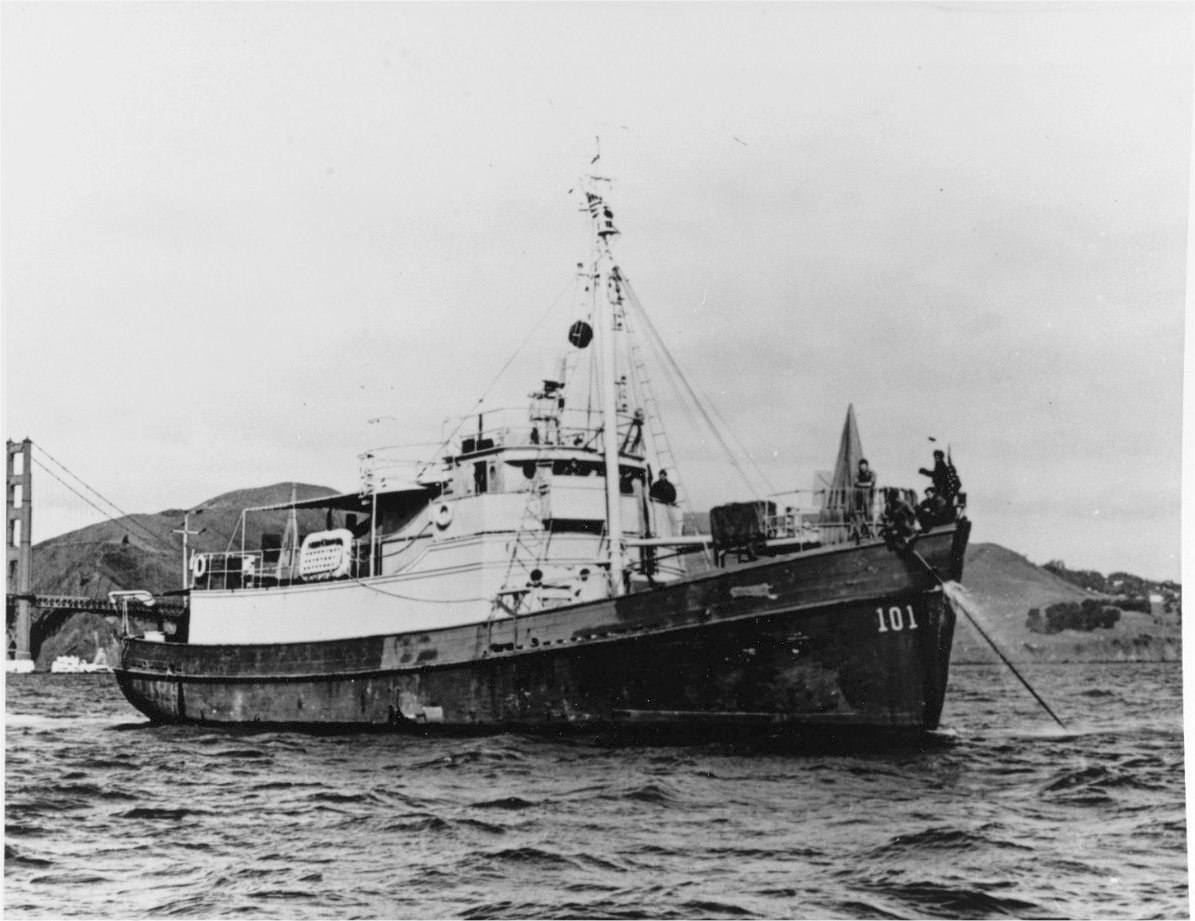
- Small Coastal Transport APc-1 class

History

United States
- Name: USS APc-21
- Builder: Hodgdon Brothers, Goudy and Stevens, East Boothbay, Maine
- Laid down: 24 May 1942, as a coastal minesweeper AMc-173
- Launched: 2 September 1942
- Commissioned: 27 February 1943, as APc-21
- Fate: Sunk, 17 December 1943

General characteristics
- Class & type: APc-1 class small coastal transport vessel
- Displacement: 100 long tons (102 t) light; 234 long tons (238 t) full load
- Length: 103 ft (31 m)
- Beam: 21 ft 3 in (6.48 m)
- Draft: 9 ft 3 in (2.82 m)
- Propulsion: 1 × 400 shp (298 kW) Atlas 6HM2124 diesel engine; 1 × shaft
- Speed: 10 knots (19 km/h; 12 mph)
- Complement: 25 (3 officers, 22 enlisted)
- Armament: 4 × single 20 mm AA gun mounts

Service record
- Part of: Amphibious Force Seventh Fleet
- Operations: Battle of Arawe

USS APc-21 was a United States Navy APc-1-class small coastal transport vessel in World War II. Laid down on 24 May 1942 as Coastal Minesweeper AMc-173 at Hodgdon Brothers, and Goudy and Stevens, East Boothbay, Maine, she was launched on 2 September 1942 and commissioned as APc-21 on 27 February 1943.

She sailed from Maine to Brisbane, Australia and served with the Seventh Fleet Amphibious Force in the South West Pacific Area conducting operations off the coast of New Guinea. She was participating in the landings during the battle of Arawe when struck by a bomb from an enemy air attack off Arawe, New Britain on 17 December 1943 and sank within four minutes.

Wreck location: 6°14′57″S 149°0′53″E

== Bibliography ==
Online resources

- wikimapia (2012). "Wreck of USS APc-21 Second World War 1939-1945, military, shipwreck, United States Navy". Wikimapia.org.
