= USS Conflict (AM-426) =

Minesweeper of the United States Navy

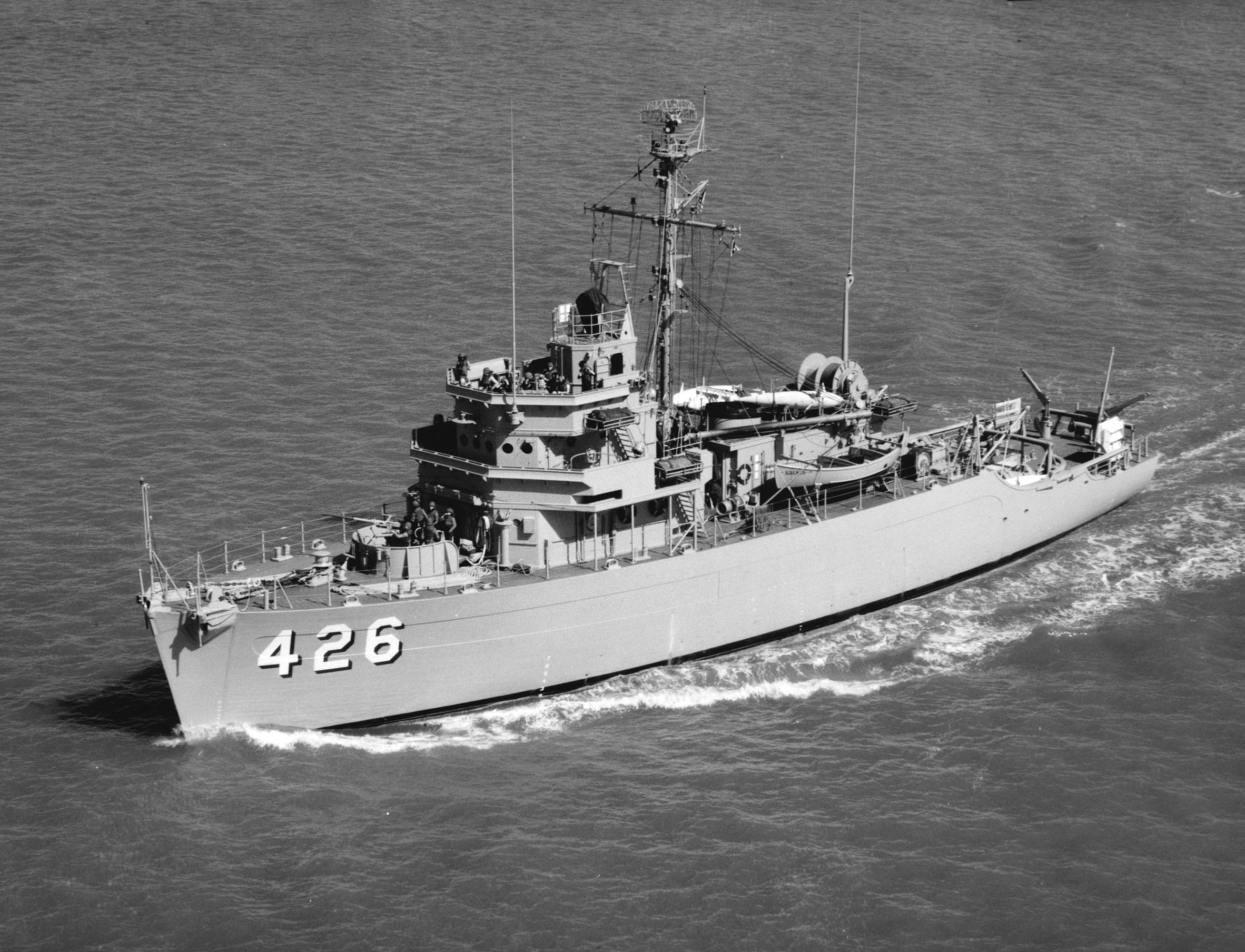
- USS Conflict (MSO-426) underway, circa 1954.

History

United States
- Name: USS Conflict
- Builder: Fulton Shipyard, Antioch, California
- Laid down: 13 August 1951
- Launched: 16 December 1952
- Commissioned: 23 March 1954, as AM-426
- Decommissioned: 12 January 1973
- Reclassified: MSO-426 (Ocean Minesweeper), 7 February 1955
- Fate: Sold for scrapping, 1973

General characteristics
- Class & type: Agile-class minesweeper
- Displacement: 630 long tons (640 t)
- Length: 172 ft (52 m)
- Beam: 36 ft (11 m)
- Draft: 10 ft (3.0 m)
- Propulsion: 4 × Packard ID1700 diesel engines; 2 × shafts; 2 × controllable pitch propellers
- Speed: 16 knots (30 km/h; 18 mph)
- Complement: 72
- Armament: 1 × 40 mm gun mount

USS Conflict (AM-426/MSO-426) was an Agile-class minesweeper in the United States Navy.

Conflict was laid down on 13 August 1951 at Fulton Shipyard, Antioch, California. Launched on 16 December 1952, she was commissioned on 23 March 1954. She was later redesignated as an Ocean Minesweeper MSO-426 on 7 February 1955.

== Service history ==
Conflict operated on the west coast between 12 April 1954 and 4 January 1956, conducting acoustic ranging experiments, noise reduction experiments, and removing practice mine fields. She was reclassified MSO-426 on 7 February 1955.

She sailed from Long Beach, California, 4 January 1956 for Pearl Harbor, where between 15 January and 20 February, she conducted underwater photography operations. She returned to Long Beach 1 March, and during April conducted shock tests off San Clemente Island, California. Conflict joined harbor defense exercises at San Diego, California, and carried out other local operations until 5 August 1957, when she sailed from Long Beach for Pearl Harbor, Midway Island, and Yokosuka, Japan, arriving on 31 August.

She operated in Japanese waters, called at Hong Kong, and joined ships of the Republic of China in minesweeping exercises off Formosa, returning to Long Beach 1 March for west coast operations during the remainder of the year. She returned to duty in the Far East on 14 March 1960, calling at Manila, Hong Kong, Taiwan, and Japanese ports before sailing for the west coast on 24 June. Local operations were resumed through the remainder of 1960.

== Decommissioning ==
Conflict was decommissioned in June 1972. Struck from the Naval Register, (date unknown), and sold for scrapping on January 12 1973 to Al Kidman, Wilmington, California, for $32,000.
