= USS Industry =

Minesweeper of the United States Navy

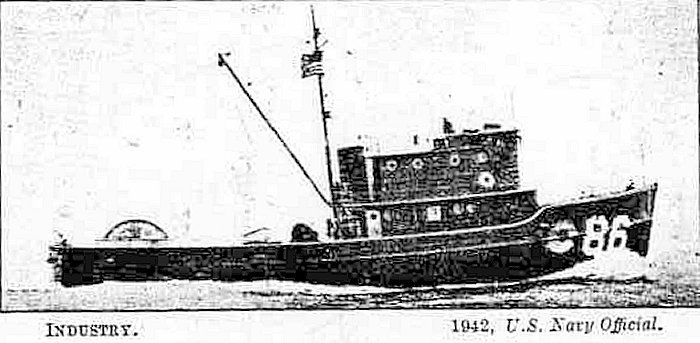

History

United States
- Builder: Fulton Shipyard, Antioch, California
- Laid down: 11 May 1941
- Launched: 6 September 1941
- Commissioned: 15 December 1944
- Decommissioned: 22 December 1945
- In service: 19 December 1941
- Out of service: 22 December 1945
- Stricken: date unknown
- Fate: ran aground in a typhoon and sunk, 9 October 1945

General characteristics
- Displacement: 195 tons
- Length: 97 ft (30 m)
- Beam: 21 ft (6.4 m)
- Draught: 9 ft 1 in (2.77 m)
- Speed: 10 knots
- Complement: 15
- Armament: two .50 cal (12.7 mm) machine guns

USS Industry (AMc-86) was an Accentor-class coastal minesweeper acquired by the U.S. Navy for the dangerous task of removing mines from minefields laid in the water to prevent ships from passing.

Industry was laid down 11 May 1941 by Fulton Shipyard, Antioch, California; launched 6 September 1941; sponsored by Miss June Marken; and placed in service 19 December 1941.

== World War II service ==
Following shakedown training, the wooden-hulled minesweeper sailed for Hawaii, arriving Pearl Harbor 11 March 1942. For more than 2 years the ship swept the channels of Pearl Harbor and Honolulu Harbor. As the Pacific Ocean war neared its climax in late 1944, the need for mine locator vessels became acute, and Industry's sweeping equipment was replaced by sound gear and diving equipment for underwater locator work. She commissioned 15 December 1944 and began training in company with USS Medrick (AMc-203).

=== Pacific Ocean operations ===
Industry and two other converted minesweepers departed Pearl Harbor 1 May 1945 and, after stops at Eniwetok, Guam and Saipan, arrived off Okinawa 4 July. There she located and raised mines and sunken Japanese midget submarines during the months that followed.

=== Fighting off air attacks and typhoons ===
The ship fought off enemy air raids in July and August, and in September endured a major typhoon. The ship was scheduled to depart for Japan in early October, but her departure was delayed by another typhoon, this one ranking with the most powerful in the recent history of Okinawa.

=== Wrecked in a typhoon ===
In the violent storm in Buckner Bay 9 October, Industry drove ashore on a reef. Her crew kept her afloat until rescue came next morning.

== Decommissioning ==
The battered minesweeper was finally stripped and decommissioned 22 December 1945. The remaining hulk was sunk.
