= USS APc-15 =

U.S. Navy vessel

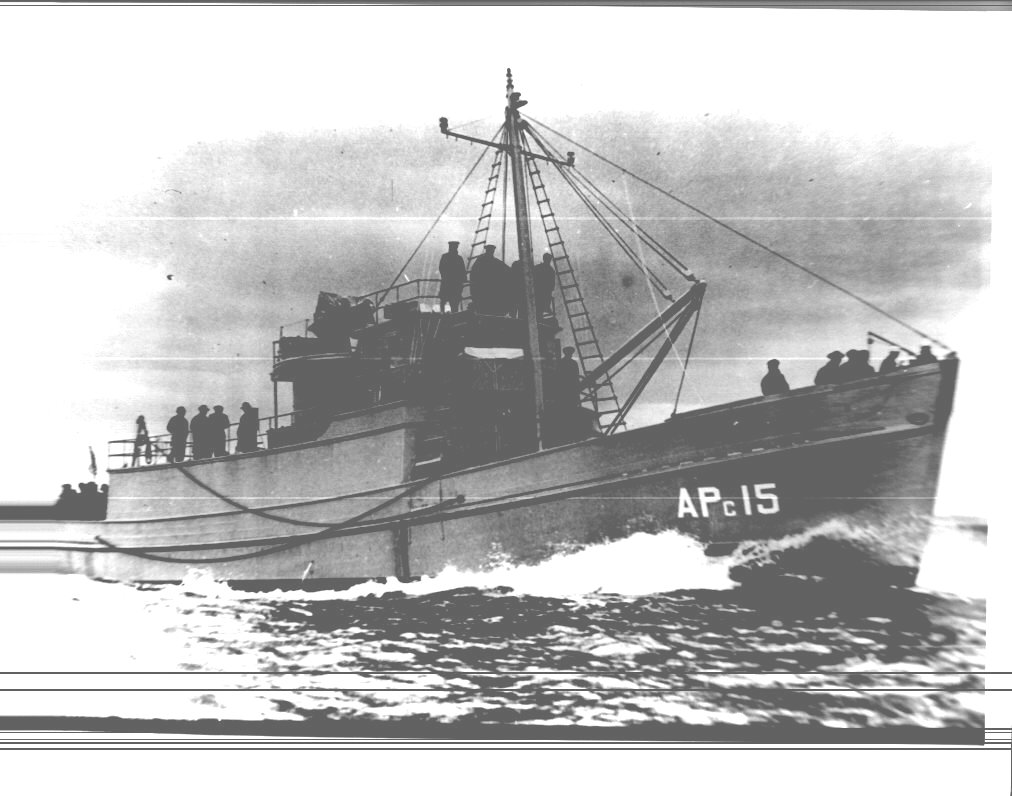
- USS APc-15

History

United States
- Name: USS APc-15
- Builder: Camden Ship Building and Marineway, Camden, Maine
- Laid down: 29 April 1942, as a coastal minesweeper AMc-155
- Launched: 9 July 1942
- Commissioned: 27 October 1942, as APc-15
- Fate: Sold, 13 January 1947

Canada
- Name: Gulf Trader (1947); La Belle (1948); Black Trader (1963)
- Owner: Vancouver Tug Boat Co (-1960)
- Identification: 179077
- Fate: Sank in 1998

General characteristics
- Class & type: APc-1 class small coastal transport vessel
- Displacement: 100 long tons (102 t) light; 234 long tons (238 t) full load
- Length: 103 ft (31 m)
- Beam: 21 ft 3 in (6.48 m)
- Draft: 9 ft 3 in (2.82 m)
- Propulsion: 1 × 400 shp (298 kW) Atlas 6HM2124 diesel engine; 1 × shaft
- Speed: 10 knots (19 km/h; 12 mph)
- Complement: 25 (3 officers, 22 enlisted)
- Armament: 4 × single 20 mm AA gun mounts

Service record
- Part of: Amphibious Force Seventh Fleet
- Operations: Landing at Scarlet Beach; Battle of Arawe

USS APc-15 was a United States Navy APc-1-class small coastal transport vessel in World War II. Laid down on 29 April 1942 as Coastal Minesweeper AMc-155 at Camden Ship Building and Marineway, Camden, Maine, she was launched on 9 July 1942 and commissioned as APc-25 on 27 October 1942.

She served with the Seventh Fleet Amphibious Force in the South West Pacific Area conducting operations off the coast of New Guinea. She took part in the Bismarck Archipelago Operations around Arawe, New Britain between 17-18 and 25-26 December 1943.

== Fate ==
She sank in 1998 at Deas Slough near Vancouver, British Columbia, Canada.
