= USS Memorable =

Minesweeper of the United States Navy

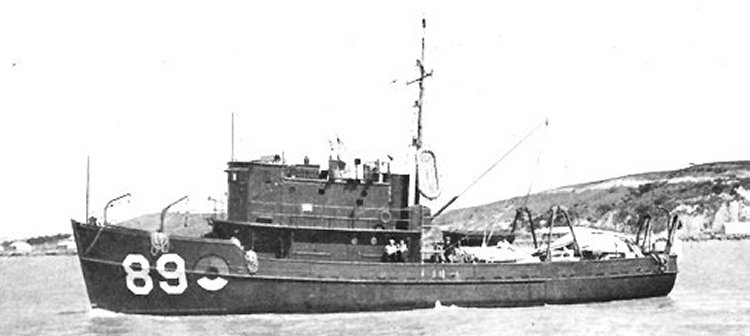

History

United States
- Builder: Fulton Shipyard
- Laid down: 31 July 1941
- Launched: 24 December 1941
- In service: 9 March 1942
- Out of service: 7 December 1945
- Stricken: 3 January 1946
- Fate: Delivered to WSA 17 September 1948 and sold.

General characteristics
- Displacement: 195 tons
- Length: 97 ft 1 in (29.59 m)
- Beam: 22 ft (6.7 m)
- Draft: 9 ft 1 in (2.77 m)
- Speed: 10 knots
- Complement: 17
- Armament: two .50 cal (12.7 mm) machine guns

USS Memorable (AMc-89) was an Accentor-class coastal minesweeper acquired by the U.S. Navy for the dangerous task of removing mines from minefields laid in the water to prevent ships from passing.

Memorable was laid down by Fulton Shipyard, Antioch, California, 31 July 1941; launched 24 December 1941; sponsored by Mrs. Mary Shor; and placed in service 9 March 1942.

== World War II service ==
After training at Local Defense School, Treasure Island, California, Memorable departed San Francisco, California, 24 March 1942, for her home port of San Pedro, California. Assigned to the western sea frontier, she operated as a unit of the San Pedro Section, Naval Local Defense Forces, 11th Naval District.

Throughout World War II she ensured the safe passage of shipping in and out of Los Angeles Harbor.

== Post-war inactivation and disposal ==
At the end of the war she was placed out of service 7 December 1945. Struck from the Naval Register 3 January 1946, she was delivered to War Shipping Administration (WSA) 17 September 1948 and was subsequently sold.
