= USS Liberator (AMc-87) =

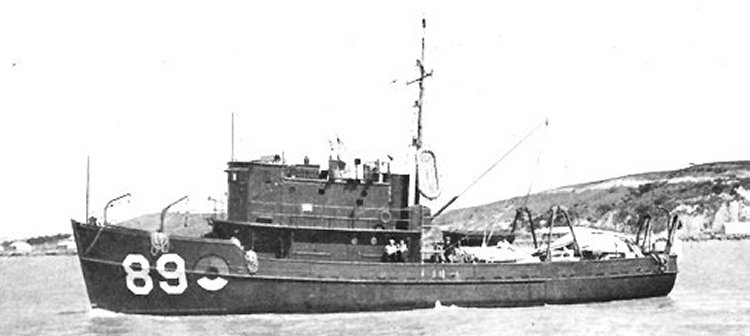
- An Accentor-class minesweeper, sister ship Memorable

History

United States
- Name: Liberator
- Builder: Fulton Shipyard
- Laid down: 5 May 1941
- Launched: 6 September 1941
- In service: 22 February 1942
- Out of service: 3 May 1945
- Stricken: Date unknown
- Fate: Turned over to WSA 2 July 1946 for disposal

General characteristics
- Class & type: Accentor-class minesweeper
- Displacement: 195 tons
- Length: 97 ft 1 in (29.59 m)
- Beam: 22 ft (6.7 m)
- Draft: 9 ft (2.7 m)
- Speed: 10 knots (19 km/h; 12 mph)
- Armament: 2 × .50 cal (12.7 mm) machine guns; 2 × .30 caliber machine guns

USS Liberator (AMc-87) was an Accentor-class coastal minesweeper acquired by the U.S. Navy for the task of removing naval mines laid in the water to prevent ships from passing.

Liberator was laid down 5 May 1941 by Fulton Shipyard, Antioch, California; launched 6 September 1941; sponsored by Miss Pay Hill; and placed in service 22 February 1942.

Assigned to the 13th Naval District, Liberator operated out of Puget Sound until she sailed for Alaska in April 1944. She swept the Alaskan shipping lanes and returned to the 13th Naval District in September.

Reclassified IX-202 on 20 December 1944, Liberator was used as a general utility ship until she was placed out of service 3 May 1945.

She was turned over to War Shipping Administration (WSA) 2 July 1946 for disposal.
