= USS Durik =

Buckley-class destroyer escort

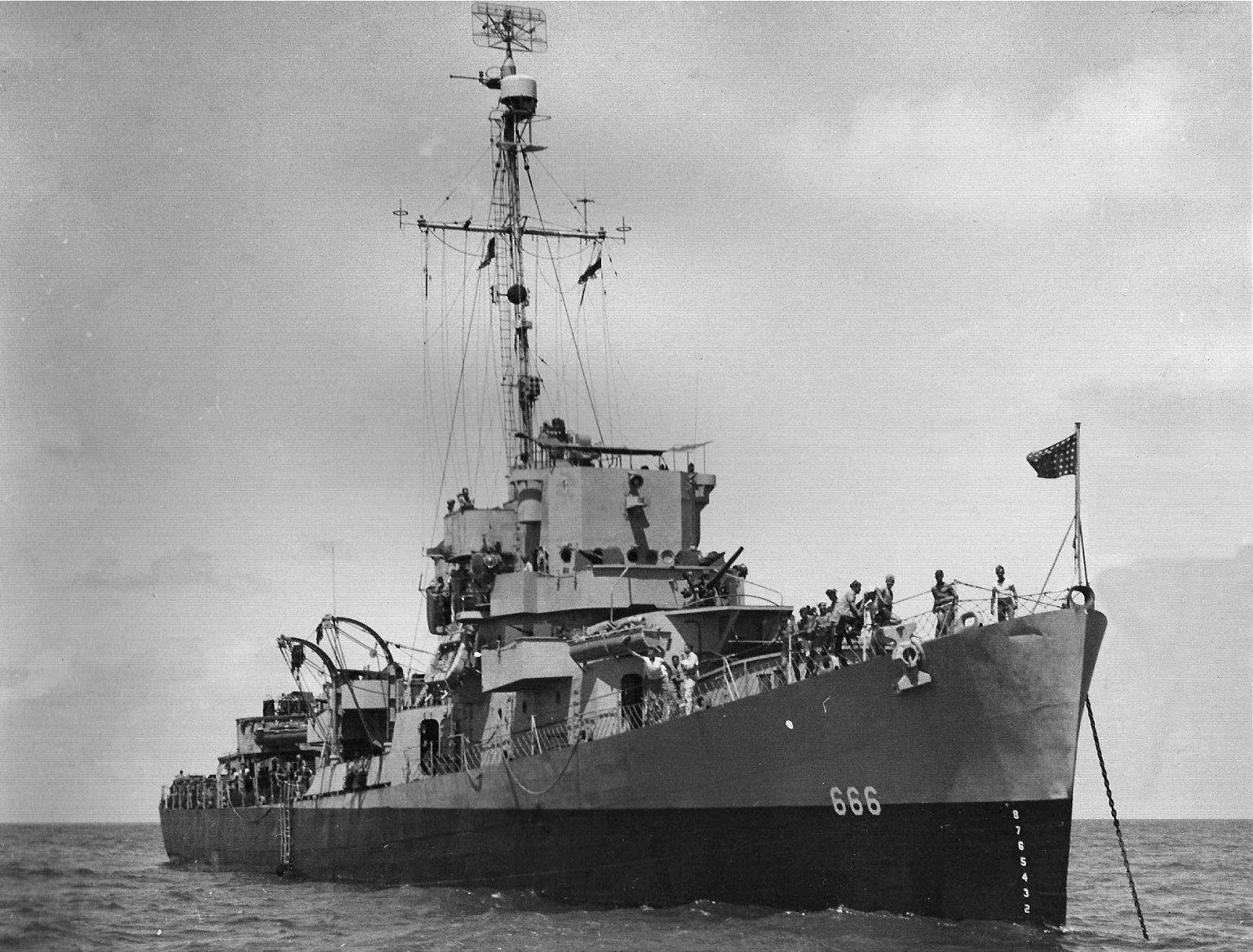
- Durik on 31 December 1944

History

United States
- Name: Durik
- Builder: Dravo Corp., Neville Island, Pennsylvania
- Laid down: 22 June 1943
- Launched: 9 October 1943
- Commissioned: 24 March 1944
- Decommissioned: 15 June 1946
- Stricken: 1 June 1965
- Fate: Sold for scrap, 30 January 1967

General characteristics
- Displacement: 1,740 tons full; 1,400 tons, standard
- Length: 306 ft 0 in (93.27 m)
- Beam: 36 ft 9 in (11.20 m)
- Draft: 13 ft 6 in (4.11 m)
- Propulsion: GE turbo-electric drive, 12,000 shp (8.9 MW); two propellers
- Speed: 24 knots (44 km/h)
- Range: 4,940 nautical miles (9,150 km) at 12 knots (22 km/h)
- Complement: 15 officers, 198 men
- Armament: 3 × 3 in (76 mm) DP guns, 3 × 21 in (53 cm) torpedo tubes, 1 × 1.1 in (28 mm) quad AA gun, 8 × 20 mm cannon, 1 × hedgehog projector, 2 × depth charge tracks, 8 × K-gun depth charge projectors

USS Durik (DE-666) was a Buckley-class destroyer escort of the United States Navy, in service from 1944 to 1946. After spending two decades in reserve, she was scrapped in 1967.

Joseph Edward Durik, the ship's namesake, was killed in an accidental firing of a torpedo aboard the destroyer USS Meredith.

== History ==
Durik was launched 9 October 1943 by Dravo Corp., Neville Island, Pennsylvania; sponsored by Mrs. M. Durik, mother of Seaman Apprentice Durik; and commissioned 24 March 1944.

=== Battle of the Atlantic ===
Between 20 May and 30 November 1944 Durik made two voyages from New York and Norfolk, Virginia escorting convoys to Casablanca, Bizerte, and Palermo. She served as schoolship for precommissioning crews of escort vessels, frigates, and high-speed transports at Norfolk from 9 December 1944 to 14 January 1945, then returned to convoy duty, making two voyages to Oran, Algeria, between 17 January 1945 and 19 May. John D. Cartano was the acting captain of Durik in 1944–1945.

Durik arrived at Miami, Florida, 8 June 1945 to serve as schoolship for the instruction of student officers. From 21 July to 5 September she was briefly overhauled at New York and trained at Guantanamo Bay, then returned to duty at Miami until 1 November when she arrived at Mayport, Fla., to serve as plane guard for USS Solomons (CVE-67) during the qualifications of pilots in carrier operations. On 28 March 1946 Durik entered Charleston Naval Shipyard, and on 27 April arrived at Green Cove Springs, Fla., where she was placed out of commission in reserve 15 June 1946.

=== Fate ===
Durik was struck from the Naval Vessel Register on 1 June 1965 and sold for scrap on 30 January 1967.
