= USS APc-25 =

Transport ship

Coordinates: 60°04′40.3″N 149°26′37.0″W

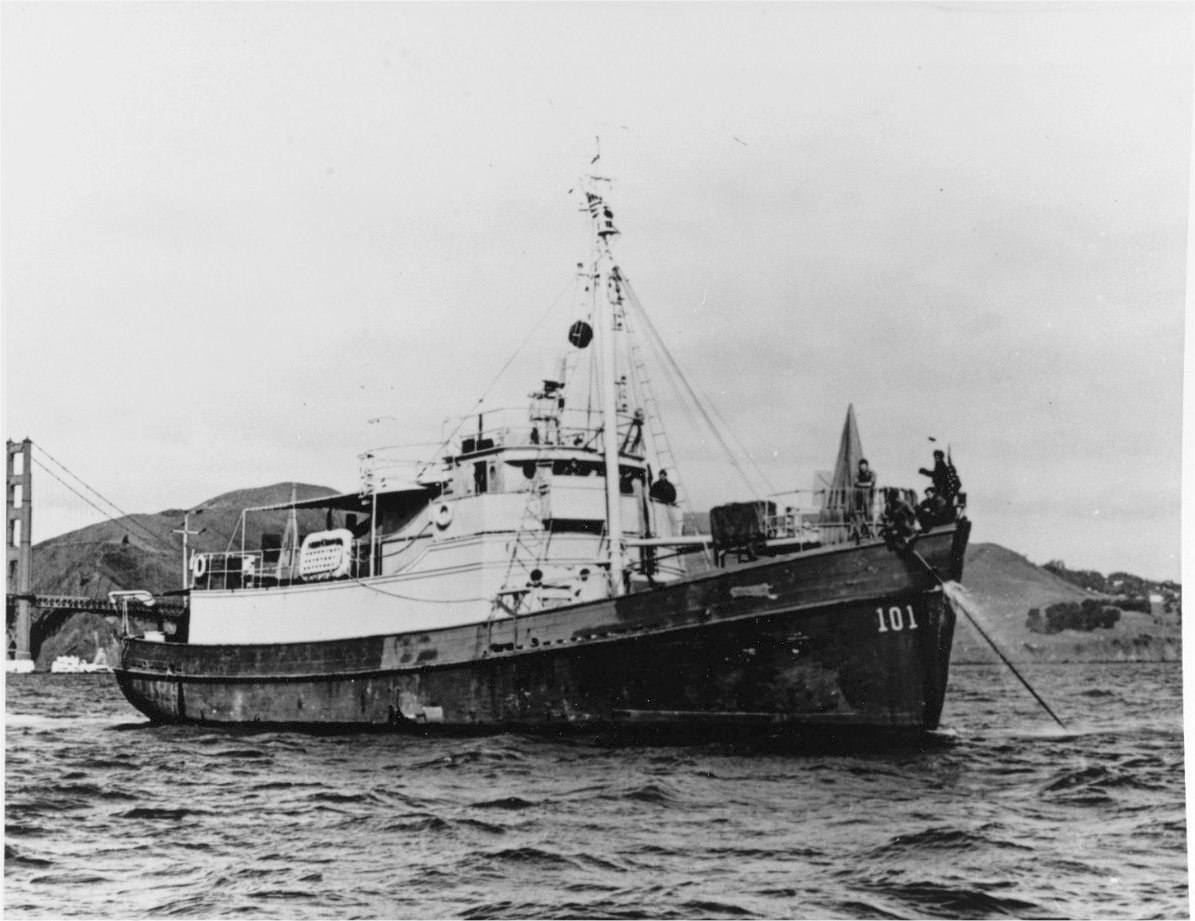
- Small Coastal Transport APc-1 class

History

United States
- Name: USS APc-25
- Ordered: 19 February 1942
- Builder: Fulton Shipyard, Antioch, California
- Laid down: 10 May 1942
- Launched: 8 July 1942
- Commissioned: 19 November 1942
- Decommissioned: 13 May 1946
- Stricken: 23 April 1947
- Fate: Sold 23 January 1947

History

United States
- Name: Coastal Trader II
- Owner: Bryce Little, Seattle (1947); Coastal Trading Co. Inc., Juneau (1948)

History

Canada
- Name: Cape Scott
- Owner: Canadian Fishing Co. Ltd., (1949–1972, 1975–1985); D & S Boat Co. Ltd. (1972–1975); Jim Pattison Industries Ltd. (1985–1991); Jim Pattison Enterprises Ltd. (1991–1993); 344130 BC Ltd. (1993–2008)
- Port of registry: Vancouver
- Identification: IMO number: 5061906

History

United States
- Name: Cape Cross
- Owner: Cape Cross Inc., Horseshoe Bend, Idaho (2008–2013)
- Fate: Grounded near Seward, Alaska, 26 July 2010

General characteristics (as APc-25)
- Class & type: APc-1-class small coastal transport
- Displacement: 100 tons
- Length: 103 ft 3 in (31.47 m)
- Beam: 21 ft 3 in (6.48 m)
- Draft: 9 ft 3 in (2.82 m)
- Propulsion: 400 hp diesel
- Speed: 10 kn (19 km/h; 12 mph)
- Complement: 21
- Armament: 2 x 20 mm cannon

USS APc-25 was a United States Navy APc-1-class small coastal transport ship. It was assigned to the Pacific in World War II where it transported supplies, personnel and munitions around the islands in the Southern Solomon Islands. It was under constant threat of air, sea and submarine attack. Built by Fulton Shipyard, Antioch, California.

== Class notes ==
On 19 January 1942, the Chief of Naval Operations directed the construction of 50 AMc coastal minesweepers, AMc 150–199. In February 1942, the Bureau of Ships issued specifications for modified design for the AMc 150–199. On 13 April 1942, the Chief of Naval Operations requested that the 50 vessels be constructed as "raider transports, AP," for use in the South Pacific.

On 20 April 1942, the District Craft Development Board recommended the following three uses for the redesigned APc transport vessels:

1. . Transportation of two officers and 74 men (possibly a raiding party) for maximum for each of 24 hours.
2. . Transportation of two officers, 15 men, and a cargo of 1,500 cu. ft. for 24 hours.
3. . Carrying a cargo of 4,000 cu. ft. (17 tons) and no passengers on a voyage of 2,500 miles.

AMc-161 was thus redesigned as APc-25.

== Assignment in World War II ==
APc-25 was assigned to the Pacific in World War II where it transported supplies, personnel and munitions around the islands in the Southern Solomon Islands.

The Navy Special Collections & Archives contains two declassified Ship Action Reports regarding APc-25 during August 1943. The first report, dated 15 August 1943 (11 pages in length), pertains to rescue work by APc-25 following the sinking of USS John Penn, on 13 August 1943. The second report, dated 18 August 1943 (11 pages in length), deals largely with enemy aircraft attacks sustained by APc-25. The Ship Action Reports were written by Commanding Officer Lieutenant John D. Cartano, and include sworn statements by other officers.

=== Rescue of the survivors of John Penn ===
According to the first Ship Action Report dated 15 August 1943, APc-25 was stationed half a mile off Lunga Point, Guadalcanal. It received orders to take medical supplies and mail to American forces stationed at Enogai on the western side of New Georgia Island, and to evacuate casualties and convoy LCT 325 and LCT 327 to the same place with supplies and equipment. On 13 August 1943, APc-25 received a condition red, and enemy action ensued. A Japanese torpedo bomber made a hit on John Penn and was hit in so doing. It crashed into the water a few hundred feet from John Penn. APc-25 immediately gave the ship emergency full speed ahead. APc-25 left its convoy, and was beside John Penn in approximately three minutes. APc-25 was the first ship of any kind to arrive. Fire had broken out at the stern of John Penn, and oil from that ship on the water had caught fire. APc-25 stopped just short of the burning oil near the stern of John Penn where a large number of her crew were swimming, floating or struggling in the water. Many were injured and were having difficulty staying afloat.

Without waiting for life rafts to be launched, at least four of the men from APc-25 dived over the side to rescue whomever they could. The first to go over the side was Lieutenant E. L. Burdick, third officer and engineering officer of APc-25. He was followed by William Lavern Hull, Thomas Francis Blake, Willard Daniel Persson, and possibly other men. Each was able to take in tow at least one of the injured men. All suitable gear was immediately put over the side of APc-25, including a rubber life raft, two ten-men life rafts, and a wherry. The crew of APc-25 manned the rafts and boat. They were quickly filled with men taken in tow. The crew of APc-25 was able to pick up numerous others by paddling around.

Cargo nets were put over the side of APc-25, which were used by survivors able to swing to the side of the ship and climb up. Stretchers were lowered to raise those were too severely injured to climb aboard and those who could not otherwise be raised. The Commanding Officer of USS APc-38 arrived on the scene at about the time that John Penn sank, although they picked up no casualties. Higgins boats (LCVP) and ducks were dispatched from shore and assisted materially in the rescue operations. The most severely injured survivors were put aboard the Higgins boats and sent ashore for immediate treatment after crew members of APc-25 administered what first aid it could. The crew members included a doctor and two extra pharmacists mates, J. D. Johnson and H. G. Hubbert. Those who were able to make the grade were sent ashore in the Higgins boats to receive hospitalization. Some were kept aboard in crew's bunks until receiving first aid treatment, and until Dr. Johnson was certain that they could safely be sent ashore. Parts of six Higgins boats were filled with these casualties. The number of survivors picked up and sent ashore was conservatively numbered at 35. There may have been more.

While first aid was being administered aboard, the life rafts and boats were searching for additional injured men. Some were picked up in a semi-conscious condition, talking incoherently, and badly injured and bleeding. Many were shock victims resulting from the explosion. Others had leg injuries, concussions, and deep gashes on the head and face. A few were severely burned. None died or drowned to the knowledge of the crew of APc-25. After the crew was satisfied that there were no more men who could be rescued and no more survivors in the water, and after APc-25 had sent ashore its last case, APc-25 returned to its convoy which had been ordered by APc-25 to stand by. APc-25 then proceeded to carry out its orders and mission, departing Laguna Point on 13 August 1943, at 10:49 p.m.

During the rescue operation, APc-25 had pressure in its fire mains. However, there was no possibility of saving John Penn. The fire spread quickly, and in approximately eight minutes, according to Commanding Officer Lieutenant John D. Cartano, John Penn began settling by the stern. In approximately a half an hour, at 9:55 p.m., the ship sank.

=== Other South Solomon Islands naval action ===
A second Special Action Report dated 18 August 1943 detailed enemy action and engagement on the trip from Lunga Point to New Georgia Island. APc-25 left Lunga Point, Guadalcanal Island, in a convoy with LCT 325 and LCT 327. These two ships were loaded with supplies and rations for American forces stationed at Enogai, New Georgia Island. The trip was approximately 235 miles. The ships proceeded via Russell Islands, Segi Point, Mongo Entrance, and Visu Visu Point. The convoy arrived at Enogai on 16 August 1943.

On 15 August 1943, aircraft were heard off the port bow of APc-25, approximately two miles beyond Lever Harbor. There was almost constant enemy air activity from that time until approximately early morning on 16 August 1943.

On 15 August 1943, a flare was dropped over Vila, Solomon Islands on Kolombangara. A second flare was dropped over Rice Anchorage. Two additional flares were dropped about two points off the starboard bow of APc-25, at about 1,500 yards distance. At approximately the time of the last two flares, a bomb, not over 500 pounds, was dropped off the port bow at a distance of approximately 300 yards. The concussion was felt. No shrapnel hit APc-25 or the crew. APc-25 had passed Visu Visu Point approximately half an hour previously, entered Kula Gulf, and was near Wilson Harbour, 1 1/2 miles offshore at the time of the engagement.

On 16 August 1943, three aircraft attacked APc-25 and its convoy at low altitude. The convoy had just arrived at Enogai Harbor, New Georgia Island, and was unloading mailbags at that time. Approximately 12 bombs were dropped in the area. Two strafing attacks were made by at least one of the aircraft. One of the crew members of LCT-325 was hit in the right knee and his left leg was broken near the thigh by a shell fragment. Another member of the same crew sustained a superficial shell wound.

A Japanese Zero floatplane strafed the PT boats that were screening the convoy on the same date, and then strafed the LCT-325 and LCT-327. When the aircraft came in at low altitude of approximately 500 yards, the LCTs opened fire. The aircraft dropped a bomb at that time and then proceeded in the direction of APc-25. The APc-25 opened fire with three 20 mm Oerlikon machine guns and two .50 caliber machine guns when the aircraft came within range at a distance of about 500 yards. The remaining guns were not in position to open fire. APc-25 fired about five magazines of 20 mm ammunition and about 150 rounds of .50-caliber ammunition. Some of the crew believed that the aircraft was hit after seeing a short burst of flame. Rev. Paul Redmond, chaplain of the 4th Marine Raiders Battalion found the remains of a Japanese aircraft the following morning, shot down on the shore in that area near Enogai. However, Commanding Officer John D. Cartano reported that he could not positively state whether APc-25 had shot down the aircraft.

APc-25 reported much aircraft activity over Rendova Island and Munda, Solomon Islands. At least one Japanese aircraft was clearly illustrated by searchlights. Anti-aircraft fire was also seen over those areas.

On 16 August 1943, the crew of APc-25 unloaded its passengers, cargo and mail and left the LCTs to unload the following day. The APc-25 departed from Enogai. They reported continuous enemy activity for several hours. Flares were dropped off Lever Harbor and aircraft were heard overhead at intervals until 5 a.m. At one point, a Japanese bomber flew overhead, at low altitude of approximately 1800 yards, but was not within range. APc-25 did not open fire in order to keep its location undisclosed. No bombs were dropped.

There were two PT boats that were most helpful to APc-25 and saved it from serious damage. When the Japanese aircraft came in for attack or dropped flares, these boats increased their speed and weight, and exploded smoke charges for the purpose of attracting attention and drawing the attack. This was in order to let the convoy get through safely. It was very effective in diverting the attack from APc-25. At least once, their smoke charges were heavily bombed by the Japanese aircraft. No additional damage was done to any of the ships. Robert Kelly, Commander Naval Motor Torpedo Base at Lever Harbor, New Georgia Island, reported 12 bombs dropped and three Japanese aircraft engaged in the attack.

APc-25 anchored at Lever Harbor on its return from Enogai. It returned the next night to pick up LCT-325 and LCT-327, escorted the two ships back to Renard Sound, Russell Islands, and left of the North entrance on 18 August 1943. APc-25 arrived at Tulagi on 18 August, and discharged 74 ambulatory cases and three stretcher cases. Its mission was then completed. APc-25 then returned to Carter City for water.

APc-25 was decommissioned on 13 May 1946 at Seattle, and struck from the Naval Register on 23 April 1947.

== Post-war career ==
In 1947 APc-25 was sold to Bryce Little of Seattle, and then in 1948 to Coastal Trading Co. Inc. of Juneau, while operating under the name Coastal Trader II. In 1949 she was transferred to Canada and renamed Cape Scott while under the ownership of the Canadian Fishing Co. Ltd. (CANFISCO) of Vancouver between 1949–1972 and 1975–1985, and was also owned by several other Vancouver-based companies up until 2008, when she returned to American ownership, and was renamed Cape Cross.

== Fate ==
On 26 July 2010 Cape Cross grounded on an uncharted pinnacle in Main Bay, Prince William Sound. A salvage crew removed fuel and oil from the vessel, and after being refloated she was towed to a point south of Seward, Alaska, where she was beached.
