= USS Constant (AM-427) =

Minesweeper of the United States Navy

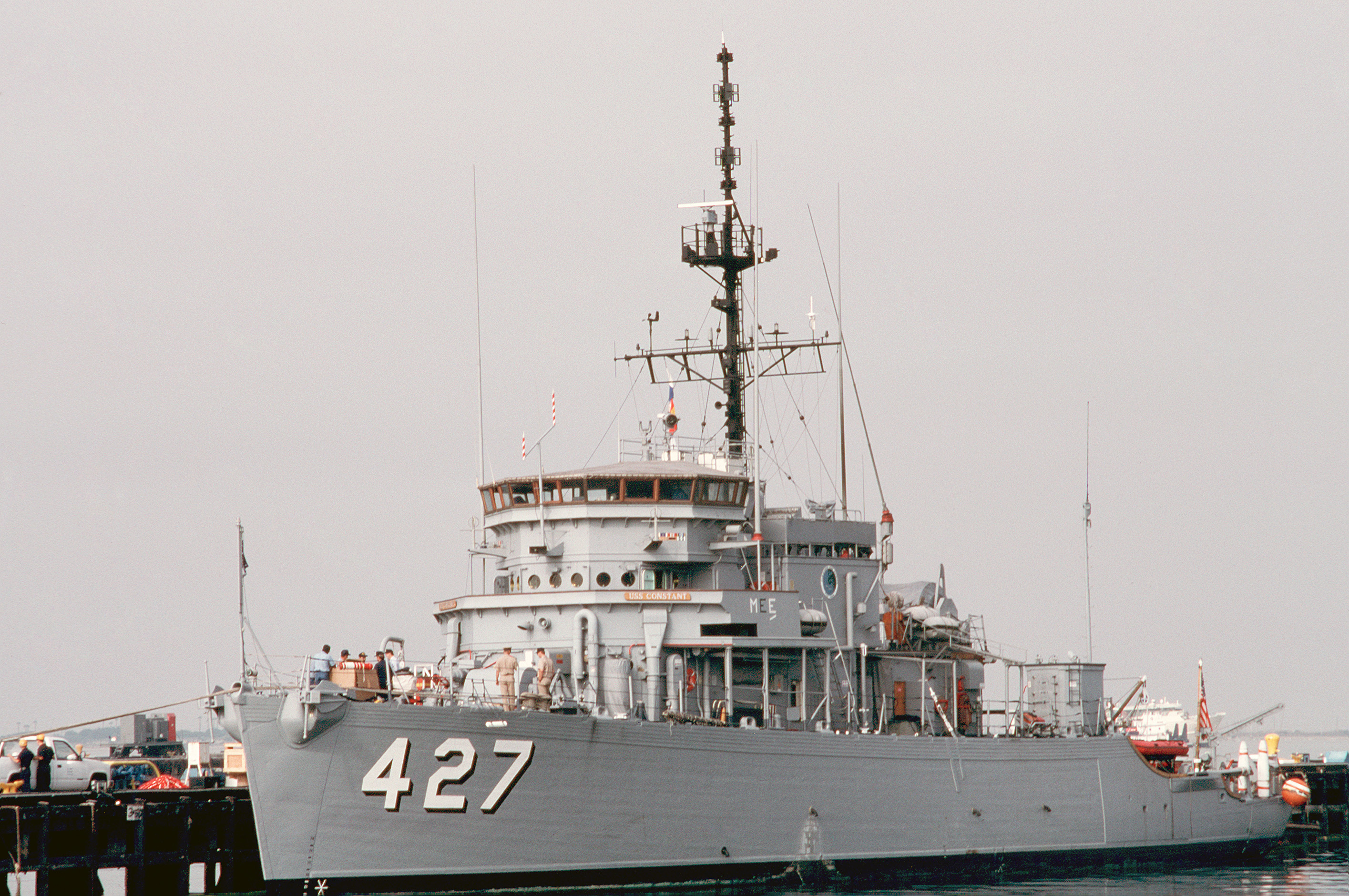

History

United States
- Builder: Fulton Shipyard, Antioch, California
- Laid down: 16 August 1951
- Launched: 14 February 1953
- Acquired: 7 September 1954
- Commissioned: 8 September 1954
- Decommissioned: 30 September 1992
- Reclassified: MSO-427, 7 February 1955
- Stricken: 9 March 1994
- Fate: Scrapped, 1 April 2001

General characteristics
- Class & type: Aggressive class minesweeper
- Displacement: 775 tons
- Length: 172 ft (52.43 m)
- Beam: 36 ft (10.97 m)
- Draught: 10 ft (3.05 m)
- Propulsion: Four Packard ID1700 diesel engines, two shafts, two controllable pitch propellers
- Speed: 14 knots
- Complement: 6 Officers, 74 Enlisted
- Armament: 1 40 mm., 2 .50 cal (12.7 mm) mg

USS Constant (AM-427/MSO-427) was an Agile class minesweeper vessel in the United States Navy.

Constant was laid down on 16 August 1951 at Fulton Shipyard, Antioch, California and launched on 14 February 1953. She was commissioned as Constant, AM-427) on 8 September 1954 and later reclassified as an Ocean Minesweeper MSO-427 on 7 February 1955.

== Pacific Ocean operations ==
Constant operated on the west coast until she cleared Long Beach, California, 4 January 1956 for Pearl Harbor and Yokosuka, Japan, arriving 4 February. She joined in amphibious exercises at Iwo Jima, made repairs to cables and conducted minesweeping and local operations from her base at Sasebo until 28 March. Between 2 April and 19 May, she sailed in training exercises with naval forces of the Republic of China based on Kaohsiung, Taiwan. She returned to Sasebo 20 April to resume operations in Japanese waters until 19 May, when she cleared Yokosuka, Japan, for Long Beach, California, arriving 15 June.

== Stateside overhaul ==
After overhaul and west coast operations, Constant sailed from Long Beach, California, 2 June 1958, for Sasebo and duty in minesweeping off Okinawa, as well as other local operations from 3 July to 30 August. She stood by at Taiwan from 2 September until 27 October during the Quemoy Crisis, then called at Hong Kong, before returning to Japan. She cleared Yokosuka, Japan, 12 December for Long Beach, California, arriving 6 January 1959. Through the remainder of 1959, and the first half of 1960, she operated locally from Long Beach. On 31 August Constant sailed for duty in the Far East, where she remained into 1961.

In the mid-1980s, she participated in one or more extended endurance Naval Reserve summer training cruises (with reservists embarked) from her homeport in San Diego to as far away as the Naval Air Station in Adak, Alaska. In June 1985, Constant called at Coast Guard Station Juneau and Coast Guard Air Station Kodiak, both in Alaska.

== Decommissioning ==
Constant was decommissioned, 30 September 1992; struck from the Naval Register, 9 March 1994; sold for scrapping to Crowley Marine, removal date 29 September 1999; scrapped, 1 April 2001.
