= USS Waxbill (AMc-15) =

Minesweeper of the United States Navy

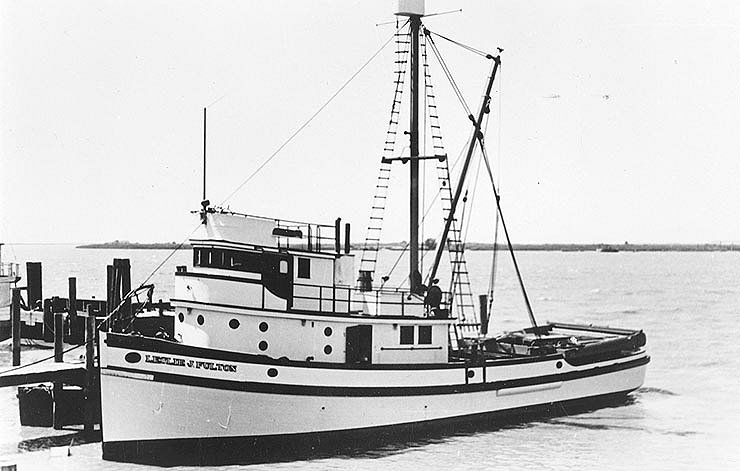
- No Photo Available

History

United States
- Name: USS Waxbill
- Builder: Fulton Shipyard, Antioch, California
- Launched: 1936, as Leslie J. Fulton
- Acquired: 19 November 1940
- Commissioned: 26 November 1940
- Decommissioned: 12 September 1944
- Stricken: 14 October 1944
- Fate: Transferred to the Maritime Commission for sale, 6 January 1945

General characteristics
- Type: Coastal minesweeper
- Displacement: 195 long tons (198 t)
- Length: 83 ft 2 in (25.35 m)
- Beam: 20 ft 11 in (6.38 m)
- Draft: 5 ft (1.5 m)
- Depth of hold: 10 ft (3.0 m)
- Propulsion: Diesel engine
- Speed: 10 knots (19 km/h; 12 mph)
- Complement: 11
- Armament: 1 × .30 cal (7.62 mm) machine gun

USS Waxbill (AMc-15) was a coastal minesweeper of the United States Navy. The ship was built as a commercial wooden-hulled purse seiner at Fulton Shipyard in Antioch, California in 1936.

== World War II Pacific Ocean operations ==
Purchased by the U.S. Navy on 19 November 1940 for eventual conversion to a coastal minesweeper, she was commissioned as USS AMc-15 on 26 November 1940, and was named Waxbill the following day. Not yet fully equipped or manned, Waxbill operated in the 12th Naval District's waters, training naval reservists through to the end of 1940.

Decommissioned on 20 January 1941, the ship was attached to the inshore patrol forces of the district as of 1 January 1941, and entered the General Engineering and Drydock Co. yard at Alameda, California, on 20 January, for conversion to a coastal minesweeper. While at Alameda, the ship was recommissioned and placed in service on 19 February 1941.

Waxbill operated locally in the 12th Naval District attached, successively, to Patrol Force, Local Defense Forces and the Mine Force for the district until she was assigned to the Western Sea Frontier Force in August 1942.

== Decommissioning ==
Reassigned to local defense forces of the district on 12 March 1943, she was eventually taken out of service on 12 September 1944 and was struck from the Navy List on 14 October 1944.

Transferred to the Maritime Commission's War Shipping Administration on 6 January 1945, the erstwhile minecraft was simultaneously sold back to her original owner, F. L. Pulton.

The ship was then turned into a fish tender, owned by James Fulton, and spent its dock time in the Fulton Shipyard where it was made. The time it spends working is off the coast of Alaska as a tender for Salmon and Herring runs.
