= USCGC Onondaga =

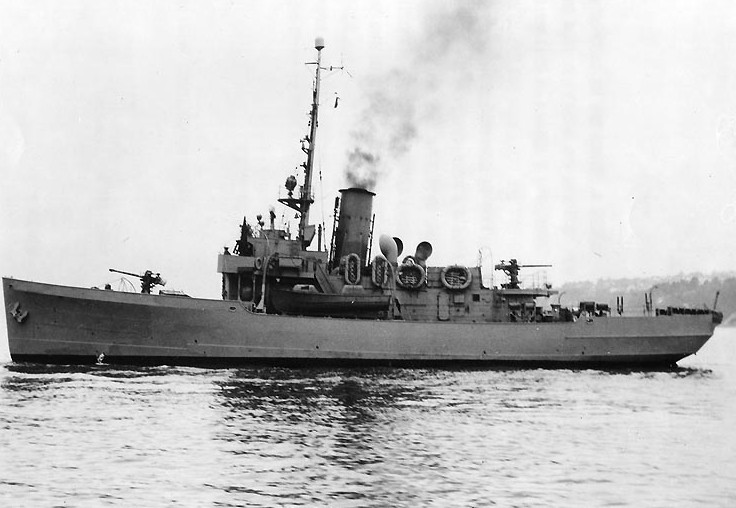
- USCGC Onondaga (WPG-79).

History

United States
- Namesake: Onondaga
- Launched: 2 August 1934
- Commissioned: 11 September 1934
- Decommissioned: 24 July 1947
- Fate: Sold 7 December 1954

General characteristics
- Displacement: 1,005 long tons (1,021 t)
- Length: 165 ft (50 m)
- Beam: 36 ft (11 m)
- Draft: 12 ft (3.7 m)
- Speed: 13 kn (24 km/h; 15 mph)
- Complement: 105
- Armament: 2 × 3-in. guns; 3 × 20mm AA guns

USCGC Onondaga (WPG-79), a United States Coast Guard cutter, was built by Defoe Boat Works in Bay City, Michigan, commissioned on 11 September 1934. From its commissioning until 1941, Onondaga was stationed at Astoria, Oregon, where she performed important law enforcement duties and rendered much assistance to ships in distress. Each year she patrolled the annual pelagic seal migration to the Pribilof Islands, and she attempted to prevent out of season halibut fishing.

Executive Order 8929 of 1 November 1941 transferred the Coast Guard to the Navy. Onondaga continued on general patrol duty, with her base of operations alternating between Seattle, Washington and Ketchikan, Alaska. When the American merchantman Mauna Ala went aground on 10 December 1941 on Clatsop Beach, Oregon, during a blackout test, Onondaga rushed to the scene and rescued thirty-six crewmen.

Then assigned to escort duty in the area of Womens Bay and Kodiak, Alaska, she was later ordered to escort duty between Cape Spencer and Dutch Harbor, Alaska, as well as anti-aircraft and escort patrol off Dutch Harbor.

When the Navy learned that the Japanese planned a thrust into Alaskan waters as part of their Midway operation, Admiral Nimitz allocated five cruisers, fourteen destroyers, six submarines, and suitable auxiliaries to counter the opposing forces in the North. Five years before the outbreak of war the area had been virtually undefended. But by September 1941, Sitka, Kodiak, and Dutch Harbor had been commissioned as Naval Air Stations, and both Kodiak and Sitka were able to service submarines. In mid-1940, the Army had established the Alaska Defense Command, with Brigadier General Simon Bolivar Buckner in command; and the Navy created an Alaskan Sector under the 13th Naval District, appointing Captain Ralph C. Parker to the command.

Parker's "Alaskan Navy" consisted of the gunboat, Charleston, as headquarters and flagship, along with the Onondaga and three former fishing boats (YP-72, YP-73, YP-74), converted to patrol craft. Commander Charles E. ("Squeaky") Anderson, USNR, a "local character of infinite resource, energy, and cunning," controlled the YP fleet with YP-72 as his unofficial flagship. Parker also had three Coast Guard lighthouse tenders (Alder, Hemlock and Cedar) and an old rescue and salvage ship (Rescuer) under his command.

By May 1942, Captain Parker expanded his fleet with two old destroyers (King, Talbot), four additional Coast Guard cutters (Haida, Atalanta, Aurora, Cyane), some more converted fishing boats (YP-86, YP-88, YP-93, YP-148, YP-152, YP-153, YP-155, YP-250, YP-251, YP-399, YP-400), three seaplane tenders (Williamson, Gillis, and Casco) with twenty PBY Catalinas, four PT Boats (PT-22, PT-24, PT-27, PT-28), and a heavily armed, converted lightship (Swiftsure) to serve as an examination vessel at the entrance to Icy Strait. Charleston alone possessed sonar, or guns larger than three inch. She, together with the destroyers and cutters, saw constant use as escorts for the freighters that brought workers and material to the new bases and airfields, none of which were complete at this time.

Toward the end of May, when the Japanese sent one task force towards Midway and another towards the Aleutians, tension quickened throughout the Pacific. Rear Admiral Robert A. Theobald, USN, Commander North Pacific Force, who had been headquartered at Kodiak through the early part of May, put to sea on 1 June in Nashville (CL-43) and rendezvoused with his augmented cruiser task force to thwart the Japanese Alaska venture. However, "Efforts to meet the enemy," writes Willoughby "were unavailing, and there was no fleet action in Alaskan waters."

Cutter Onondaga, with Lieutenant Commander S. P. Mehlman, USCG, in command, joined with the other patrol craft (Charleston, Haida, Cyane, Aurora, Bonham, and 14 YP patrol vessels) and a former minesweeper redesignated as an ocean tugboat (Oriole) formed the Surface Search Group of this Northern Pacific Force. They were to be assisted by the Air Search Group, composed of twenty PBYs and one B-17 Flying Fortress. Together these forces were to act as pickets to signal any Japanese approach.

In fact, the Japanese sought to capture nothing east of Adak, which is nearly five hundred miles from Dutch Harbor. No Japanese plan for invading the Alaskan mainland, Canada, or the United States existed. The Aleutian section of the Midway operation was essentially defensive, although also diversionary. Its object was to prevent a U.S. invasion of Japan.

American search flights commenced about 28 May, and the 5 cutters, 1 gunboat, and 14 converted fishing craft deployed as pickets on both the Pacific and Bering Sea approaches to Dutch Harbor. In view of his expectation of an attack on Dutch Harbor, Admiral Theobald's operating area south of Kodiak was well chosen. But because he guessed incorrectly, the main body of his cruiser task force was removed from the scene of action.

Japanese carrier planes launched two attacks against Dutch Harbor on 3 June, inflicting considerable damage and killing about twenty-five American soldiers and sailors. Cutter Onondaga and destroyers King and Talbot, seaplane tender Gillis, army transports President Fillmore and Morlen, and submarine S-27 went to general quarters and made haste to get underway and stand out to sea, but none cleared the harbor until the attack was over. One Japanese plane was shot down.

The next day, another Japanese carrier-based attack was launched against Dutch Harbor. About eighteen more Americans died in this attack, but at least five Japanese aircraft were shot down. The Aleutian part of the Midway operation ended in mid-June. The Japanese occupied Attu and Kiska, two islands of little except nuisance value. A phase began on 11 June which witnessed Japanese attempts to hold what they had, while the American forces prepared to blast them out.

Essentially, the Aleutian battle was a contest of air power, as was Midway. Weather consistently aided the offensive by shrouding ships in protective mist, while sweeping land targets clear. In May 1943, Attu was in American hands, and on 15 August U.S. Forces found that the Japanese had completely abandoned Kiska.

Cutter Onondaga and the other ships assigned to the Northern Pacific Force remained on patrol in northern waters through the end of the war. She returned to the United States Treasury Department on 1 January 1946, and resumed patrol duties out of Astoria.

The Onondaga also gained fame for having rescued the survivors of the liner SS Yukon wrecked near Seward, Alaska on February 4, 1946.

Onondaga was decommissioned on 24 July 1947, she was sold on 7 December 1954 to Foss Launch and Tug Company of Seattle, Washington.

== Update ==
April, 2011, Environmental Protection Agency divers surveyed the Onondaga's hull, which had been shorn of its superstructure, sunk at a pier in the Lake Washington Ship Canal near Seattle. They found no pollutants, but a recently passed state law calling for the removal of abandoned boats and barges in Washington State waters may herald her demise.

Two of Onondagas sisters ships became museum ships. The Comanche (WPG-76) served as a museum ship at Patriot's Point, South Carolina before being sunk as an artificial reef. The Mohawk (WPG-78) served as of museum ship in Key West, Florida before being sunk as an artificial reef in July 2012.

A letter appeared in the June 2, 2011 Nome Nugget noting the dearth of WW II museum and/or memorial ships preserved in Alaska even through both it and Hawaii were the front-lines of the conflict. Four ships have been set aside in Hawaii as memorial and/or museum ships. They are the USS Arizona, the USS Utah, the USS Missouri and the USS Bowfin. The letter called for the Onondaga to be retrieved for such a purpose, using the salvage and restoration of the WW I Turkish mine-layer Nusret as a precedent. The TGC Nusret N-16 was in a similar decrepit condition as the Onondaga at this writing.
