= USCGC Alder (WAGL-216) =

History

United States Lighthouse Service
- Name: Alder
- Launched: 1917
- Completed: 1917
- Acquired: acquired by the United States Lighthouse Service, March 1924
- Fate: transferred to the United States Coast Guard, 1 July 1939

United States Coast Guard
- Name: USCGC Alder (WAGL-216)
- Namesake: Previous name retained
- Acquired: 1 July 1939 (from U.S. Lighthouse Service)
- Commissioned: December 1940
- Reclassified: WAGL-216
- Homeport: Ketchikan, Territory of Alaska
- Fate: Sold, 14 June 1948

General characteristics
- Type: Lighthouse tender
- Tonnage: 80 GRT
- Length: 72 ft (22 m) o/a
- Beam: 16 ft (4.9 m)
- Draught: 7.5 ft (2.3 m)
- Installed power: 110 bhp (82 kW)
- Propulsion: 1 screw, diesel
- Speed: 8 knots (15 km/h; 9.2 mph)
- Range: 875 miles (1,408 km)
- Complement: 9

USCGC Alder (WAGL-216) was a wooden-hull lighthouse tender in commission in the fleet of the United States Lighthouse Service as USLHT Alder from 1924 to 1939, and in the fleet of the United States Coast Guard as USCGC Alder from 1939 until 1948. During World War II, she was given the additional designation (WAGL-216).

== History ==
She was launched in 1917 and acquired by the United States Lighthouse Service in March 1924 for work as a lighthouse tender in the waters surrounding the Territory of Alaska. In 1929, she exploded and sank but was soon after re-floated and rebuilt. On 1 July 1939, the U.S. Lighthouse Service was abolished and the United States Coast Guard took over its responsibilities and assets; and Alder became part of the Coast Guard fleet as USCGC Alder. She continued to operate out of Ketchikan, Territory of Alaska as her home-port. She was commissioned in December 1940 and attached to the newly created Alaska Sector of the 13th Naval District (headquartered at Puget Sound Naval Shipyard) where she was one of the few ships then in newly appointed Captain R.C. Parker's small "Alaskan Navy" which consisted of the gunboat and flagship USS Charleston, the cutter USCGC Onondaga, three converted patrol craft (YP-72, YP-73, YP-74), and her sister lighthouse tenders, USCGC Hemlock and USCG Cedar. She was decommissioned on 11 December 1947. On 14 June 1948, she was sold, renamed Acme, and operated as a merchant vessel. In 1960, she was sold and renamed Lummi. On 15 November 1960, she foundered and sank off the coast of Baja California.
