= USCGC Alder =

USCGC Alder can refer to the following ships of the United States Coast Guard:

- USCGC Alder (WAGL-216), a lighthouse tender launched in 1917 for the United States Lighthouse Service. The vessel was acquired in 1922 by the United States Coast Guard and remained in service until sunk by a German U-boat on 15 March 1942.
- USCGC Alder (WLB-216), a Juniper-class buoy tender launched in 2004.
