= USCGC Aurora =

United States Coast Guard patrol boat

History

United States Coast Guard
- Name: USCGC Aurora
- Namesake: Aurora
- Builder: Bath Iron Works
- Laid down: January 1931
- Launched: 28 November 1931
- Commissioned: December 1931
- Decommissioned: 17 January 1968
- Identification: WPC-103
- Honors and awards: Armed Forces Expeditionary Medal
- Fate: Sold, 16 December 1968

General characteristics
- Class & type: Thetis-class patrol boat
- Displacement: 337 long tons (342 t) (1933); 350 long tons (360 t) (1945)
- Length: 165 ft (50 m)
- Beam: 25 ft 3 in (7.70 m)
- Draft: 7 ft 8 in (2.34 m) (1933); 10 ft 0 in (3.05 m) (1945)
- Installed power: 1,340 bhp
- Propulsion: 2 × Winton Model 158 6-cylinder diesels 1,340 brake horsepower (1,000 kW)
- Speed: 11 kn (20 km/h; 13 mph) cruising; 16 kn (30 km/h; 18 mph) maximum
- Range: 1,750 statute miles (14 knots); 3,000 statute miles (11 knots); 6,417 statute miles (6 knots)
- Complement: 44 (1933); 75 (1945)
- Sensors & processing systems: None (1933; SF Radar (1945); QCO Sonar (1945)
- Armament: 1933; 1 × 3 inch gun; 1 × 1-pounder; 1941; 1 × 3 inch gun; 1 × Y-gun; 2 x depth charge tracks; 1945; 2 x single-mount 3"/50 caliber gun; 2 x single mount 20mm/80 cannon; 2 x depth charge tracks; 2 x Y-guns; 2 x Mousetraps

USCGC Aurora (WPC-103) was a 165-foot (50 m), steel-hulled, diesel-powered Thetis-class patrol boat of the United States Coast Guard.

== History ==
She was laid down in January 1931 at the Bath, Maine shipyard of Bath Iron Works and launched on 28 November 1931 one of 18 Thetis-class patrol boats. She was commissioned on 21 December 1931. She was one of the early ships in the mid-1941 established Alaskan Sector (colloquially known as the "Alaskan Navy") of the 13th Naval District under Captain Ralph C. Parker. During the Japanese attack on the Aleutian Islands in June 1942, she served as part of Task Force 8 under Rear Admiral Robert A. Theobald, Commander of the North Pacific Force, tasked with defending Alaska from Japanese attack. She was part of Task Group 8.2 (the Surface Search Group) consisting of the patrol craft of Parker's fleet: his flagship, the gunboat (Charleston); 5 cutters (Aurora, Onondaga, Haida, Cyane, and Bonham); 14 YP patrol vessels; and a former minesweeper redesignated as an ocean tugboat (Oriole). TG 8.2 was to establish a picket line to signal any Japanese approach. Their picket was augmented by planes from the Air Search Group consisting of twenty PBY Catalina flying boats (operated by seaplane tenders Williamson, Gillis, and Casco) and one land-based B-17 Flying Fortress bomber.

Some time after the war, she was based at San Juan, Puerto Rico. She was involved in operations during the Cuban Missile Crisis (1962) and the Dominican Civil War (1965) for which she was awarded the Armed Forces Expeditionary Medal. She was decommissioned on 17 January 1968 and sold on 16 December 1968. She finished her days as a merchant ship under the same name (registration SE1998).
