= USS Arivaca =

Cahto-class district harbor tug

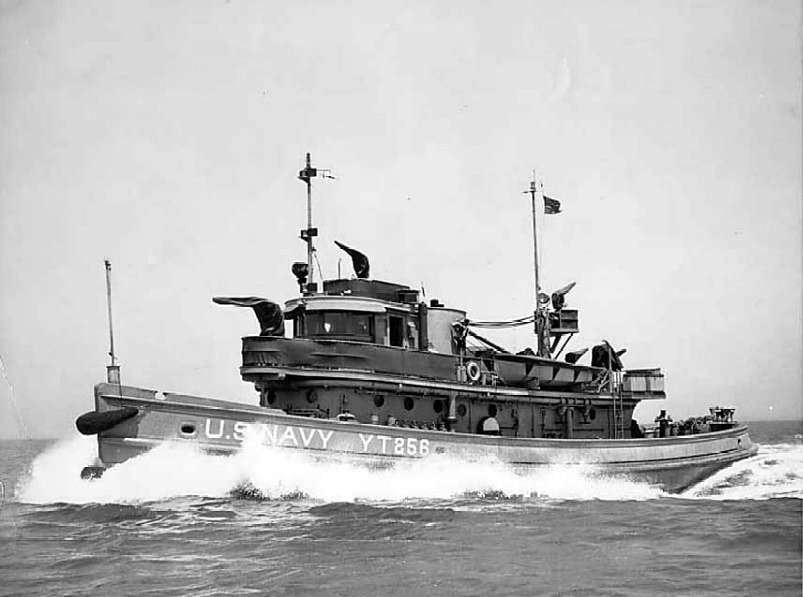
- USS Arivaca twin sister ship, the USS Menoquet

History

United States
- Name: USS Arivaca (YTB-259)
- Builder: Anderson & Cristofani, San Francisco, CA
- Laid down: 25 April 1944
- Launched: 28 October 1944
- In service: 24 January 1945
- Out of service: 1964
- Reclassified: Harbor District Tug, Medium YTM-259, February 1962
- Fate: unknown

General characteristics
- Class & type: Cahto-class district harbor tug
- Displacement: 410 long tons (417 t)
- Length: 110 ft 0 in (33.53 m)
- Beam: 27 ft 0 in (8.23 m)
- Draft: 11 ft 4 in (3.45 m)
- Speed: 12 knots (22 km/h; 14 mph)
- Complement: 12
- Armament: 2 × .50-caliber machine guns

USS Arivaca (YTB-259) was laid down on 25 April 1944 at San Francisco, California by Anderson & Cristofani; reclassified a large harbor tug and redesignated YTB-259 on 15 May 1944; launched on 28 October 1944; and placed in service on 24 January 1945.

== Service life ==
Arivaca was assigned duty in the 12th Naval District and remained so occupied until the middle of 1955. At the beginning of the summer of 1955, the tug was deactivated preparatory to being loaned to some organization whose identity is not now known. The transfer appears to have taken place in November 1955, and the loan lasted almost two years. In October 1957, the tug returned to active service in the 12th Naval District. In February 1962, Arivaca was reclassified a medium harbor tug and was redesignated YTM-259. Two years later, on 17 February 1964, Arivaca was sold by the Navy and renamed Sea Hawk, Official Number 294212.

== See also ==
- Arivaca, Arizona
