= USS Vega (AK-17) =

Cargo ship of the United States Navy

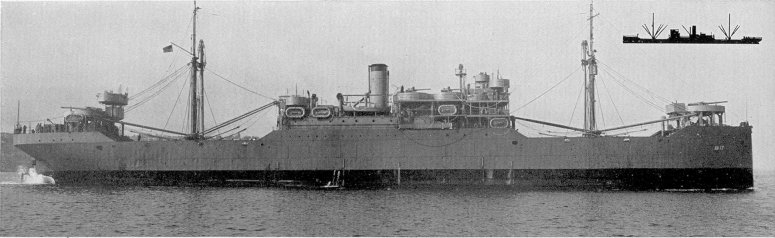
- USS Vega (AK-17)

History

United States
- Name: Lebanon; Vega
- Namesake: Vega
- Builder: American International Shipbuilding, Hog Island, Pennsylvania
- Laid down: 8 July 1918, as SS Lebanon
- Launched: 18 July 1919
- Acquired: 2 December 1921
- Commissioned: 21 December 1921
- Decommissioned: 15 January 1946
- Stricken: 12 March 1946
- Honors and awards: 4 battle stars (World War II)
- Fate: Sold by the Maritime Commission, 6 August 1946, for scrapping to National Metals and Steel Corp.

General characteristics
- Class & type: Sirius-class cargo ship
- Type: Design 1022 ship
- Displacement: 4,037 t (3,973 long tons) (standard); 11,360 t (11,180 long tons) (full load)
- Length: 401 ft (122 m)
- Beam: 54 ft 2 in (16.51 m)
- Draft: 24 ft 5 in (7.44 m)
- Installed power: 2,500 shp (1,900 kW)
- Propulsion: 1 × General Electric-Curtis steam turbines; 2 × Babcock & Wilcox boilers header-type boilers, 215psi Sat; 1 × shaft
- Speed: 11.1 kn (12.8 mph; 20.6 km/h)
- Capacity: 5,100 DWT
- Complement: 36 officers 413 enlisted
- Armament: 2 × 5 in (130 mm)/38 caliber dual purpose guns; 4 × 3 in (76 mm)/50 caliber dual purpose guns; 8 × 20 mm (0.79 in) Oerlikon cannons anti-aircraft gun mounts

USS Vega (AK-17), was a Sirius-class cargo ship of the United States Navy, originally the Lebanon — a single-screw, steel-hulled Type 1022 freighter, built under a United States Shipping Board contract at Hog Island, Pennsylvania, by the American International Shipbuilding Co. Laid down on 8 July 1918, the ship was launched on 18 July 1919. Acquired by the Navy on 2 December 1921, she was renamed Vega and given the classification of AK-17. She fitted out for Navy service, and was commissioned at the Boston Navy Yard on 21 December 1921.

== Service history ==
=== Naval Transportation Service, 1921–1924 ===
Assigned to the Naval Transportation Service, Vega served the Navy from Atlantic to Pacific on cargo runs which included calls at both east- and west-coast ports, as well as visits to the Far East and the Caribbean. During the first three years of her naval service, Vega completed six round-trip voyages from San Francisco to Asiatic waters before returning home in October 1924.

=== 1925–1940 ===
In successive summers from 1925 to 1928, the cargo vessel operated between Seattle, Washington, and Alaskan ports, carrying supplies and stores to naval radio stations at St. Paul and Dutch Harbor. In addition, Vega and sister ship Sirius (AK-15) carried general freight, heavy guns, and ordnance parts in support of Marine peacekeeping activities in Nicaragua. Among Vega's cruises were voyages in 1928 carrying supplies for the Bureau of Fisheries, Commerce Department, to seal rookeries on Pribilof and other Alaskan islands. She returned with seal skins garnered during supervised killings.

Vega operated in unglamorous, but vital logistical duties into the 1930s as the tide of war crept closer toward the United States.

=== Attack on Pearl Harbor, 1941 ===
On 6 December 1941, Vega arrived at Honolulu, Hawaii — her holds laden with ammunition for the Naval Ammunition Depot, Pearl Harbor, and an Army derrick barge in tow — moored to Pier 31 and commenced unloading her cargo at 0100 on 7 December. When Japanese aircraft swept over Oahu, Vega went to general quarters, opening fire with her anti-aircraft guns, as civilian stevedores continued the arduous job of unloading her dangerous cargo. Since the Japanese were after bigger game, the "Hog Islander" and her vital cargo emerged from the attack unscathed.

=== Hawaii, 1942 ===
Vega remained in the Hawaiian Islands until 3 January 1942, when she got underway with a cargo of civilian automobiles and pineapples. She arrived at San Francisco 10 days later and soon entered Mare Island Navy Yard for refit. She returned to Hawaiian waters on 10 March. After detaching her tow, Progress (AMc-98), and unloading construction gear, the cargo vessel loaded another cargo of pineapples and civilian dependents' gear and got underway for the west coast on 20 March.

=== Aleutian Islands, 1942–1944 ===
Transferred to the operational control of Commandant, 13th Naval District, Vega departed San Francisco for Tacoma, Washington, on 9 April. From then until 9 January 1944, the cargo vessel operated out of Tacoma and Seattle, carrying vital construction materials and supporting American operations against the Japanese invaders in the Aleutian Islands. On one run, Vega delivered a cargo of naval stores and ammunition, as well as some 20 mm anti-aircraft guns for the garrison at Dutch Harbor — only a few days before the devastating bombardment of that base by a Japanese light carrier strike force in early June 1942.

=== Supporting Pacific operations, 1944–1945 ===
The ship returned to San Francisco early in 1944 and was soon assigned to Service Squadron (ServRon) 8. During the next year, the cargo vessel supported three major amphibious operations — in the Marianas, the Western Carolines, and at Okinawa — carrying supplies and construction materials to assist the "Seabees" in establishing the advance bases necessary to the smooth operation of the Fleet. She picked up her first load of pontoon barges at Pearl Harbor and got underway for the Gilbert Islands on 31 January. However, her orders were changed en route, sending her to the Marshalls. She arrived at Kwajalein Atoll on 6 March, unloaded the barges, and returned to San Francisco for another load. Departing San Francisco on 18 May, she unloaded at Guam before steaming back to the Russells to pick up another load at Banika Island.

On 23 October 1944, Vega commenced loading empty brass powder cans at Ulithi in the Carolines, while her embarked "Seabee" battalion — the 1044th — assembled self-propelled barges brought out in SS Claremont. Subsequently, the cargo vessel sailed for Eniwetok where she took on board another load of brass casings, heading for Pearl Harbor on 30 December, en route to the west coast. She made port at San Francisco, a familiar terminus for the ship, on 18 January 1945. Vega departed the west coast with another load of barges on 9 March bound, via Eniwetok and Ulithi, for the Ryukyus. Dropping anchor off Okinawa on 13 June, Vega began assembling pontoon barges; and, three days later, during a Japanese air raid on her anchorage, the cargo vessel shot down a twin-engined bomber before its pilot could drop his bombs.

Departing Okinawa on 6 July, the cargo vessel sailed, via Pearl Harbor, for the west coast and arrived at San Pedro soon thereafter. Offloading empty brass picked up at Pearl Harbor, Vega transported a cargo of dry stores to San Francisco.

=== Decommissioning and sale ===
Proceeding on to Oakland, California, she was decommissioned on 15 January 1946. Struck from the Navy List on 12 March, she was turned over to the Maritime Commission on 1 July. The veteran cargo vessel was sold on 6 August to the National Metal and Steel Corp. for scrapping.

== Awards ==
Vega received four battle stars for her World War II service, and the Combat Action Ribbon for Pearl Harbor.
