= USS YP-73 =

- USS YP-73, 1940-1943

History

United States Navy
- Name: YP-73
- Builder: Bellingham Marine Ways, Bellingham, Washington
- Launched: April 1937
- Sponsored by: Pacific American Fisheries, Bellingham, Washington
- Completed: 1937
- Acquired: purchased by the U.S. Navy, November 1940
- Commissioned: December 1940
- Stricken: 23 February 1945
- Identification: ON 236328
- Honours and awards: American Defense Service Medal; American Campaign Medal; Asiatic-Pacific Campaign Medal; World War II Victory Medal
- Fate: Sunk after striking a reef, 15 January 1945
- Notes: Call sign: NUNM

General characteristics
- Tonnage: 115 gross register tons
- Length: 84.5 ft (25.8 m) o/a
- Beam: 22.0 ft (6.7 m)
- Draught: 9.1 ft (2.8 m)
- Installed power: 300 bhp
- Propulsion: diesel engine
- Complement: 16
- Armament: 1 x 3"/23 caliber gun

The USS YP-73 (ex-Corsair) was a converted fishing vessel which served as an auxiliary patrol boat in the U.S. Navy during World War II.

== History ==
She was built in Bellingham, Washington by Bellingham Marine Ways for the benefit of Pacific American Fisheries, of Bellingham. She was launched in April 1937, completed later in 1937, configured as a cannery tender, and christened Corsair.

In November 1940, she was purchased by the United States Navy for $47,500 and commissioned in December 1940. She was designated as a Yard patrol boat (YP). Her armament consisted of a single 3"/23 caliber gun. She was assigned along with two other converted fishing vessels (YP-72 and YP-74) to the newly created Alaska Sector of the 13th Naval District under Captain R. C. Parker who was tasked with building up the nearly absent Naval defenses of Alaska and the Aleutian Islands. In March 1941, Lieutenant William B. Dell USNR was named commanding officer.

Once in Alaska, she and her fellow YPs joined the former Coast Guard cutter Onondaga and the gunboat Charleston to form what was colloquially called the "Alaskan Navy." Commandeer Charles E. ("Squeaky") Anderson, USNR, a "local character of infinite resource, energy, and cunning", was responsible for the YP fleet taking YP-72 as his flagship. In September 1942, Lieutenant Gordon Robert Deits was named commanding officer. By June 30, 1943, she was one of 25 "Yippee" boats assigned to the Alaskan sector.

On 15 January 1945, she struck a reef and sunk 1,000 meters west of the Spruce Cape signal station at 57°49′N 152°20′W outside the entrance to Kodiak, Kodiak Island. Although six crew members were rescued by the Coast Guard cutter Bittersweet, ten died from exposure due to the extreme cold. She was struck from the Naval List on 23 February 1945.
