= USS Zumbrota =

Patrol vessel of the United States Navy

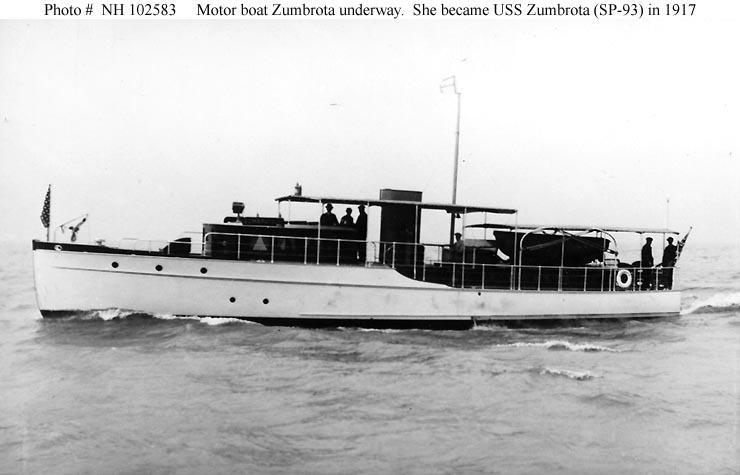
- Zumbrota sometime between 1914 and 1917, prior to her United States Navy service

History

United States
- Name: USS Zumbrota
- Builder: Matthews Boat Company, Port Clinton, Ohio
- Launched: 1914
- Acquired: 11 August 1917
- Commissioned: 11 August 1917
- Decommissioned: 5 November 1926
- Reclassified: YP-93, 1920
- Stricken: 8 November 1926
- Fate: Sold in Key West, 3 May 1927

General characteristics
- Type: Motor boat
- Tonnage: 34 long tons (35 t) (gross)
- Length: 70 ft (21 m)
- Beam: 14 ft 6 in (4.42 m)
- Draft: 2 ft 1 in (0.64 m)
- Speed: 12.5 knots (23.2 km/h; 14.4 mph)
- Complement: 7
- Armament: 1 × 3-pounder gun; 2 × machine guns

USS Zumbrota (SP-93/YP-93) was a motor boat in the United States Navy.

Zumbrota was built in 1914 at Port Clinton, Ohio, by the Matthews Boat Company and was acquired by the Navy on 11 August 1917 from circus entrepreneur, Charles Ringling, of Sarasota, Florida. It was acquired for service as a section patrol boat and was designated SP-93.

== East Coast operations ==
Commissioned on 11 August 1917, Zumbrota was assigned to the 7th Naval District and operated out of Key West, Florida. She conducted local patrols for the duration of the war. Redesignated YP-93 in 1920, she continued her operations in the Florida waters of the 7th Naval District until decommissioned on 5 November 1926. Struck from the Navy List on 8 November 1926, the boat was sold to the Thompson Fish Co., of Key West, on 3 May 1927.

She is not to be confused with similarly designated USS YP-93 (ex-Margaret F) built in 1931.

== Current Port ==
The Zumbrota currently resides in southern California as a charter yacht. It was listed on the National Register of Historic Places listings in Los Angeles County, California as of March 20, 2017.
