= USS Royal =

Minesweeper of the United States Navy

History

United States
- Operator: US Navy
- Builder: Anderson & Cristofani
- Laid down: 1 November 1941
- Launched: 19 March 1942
- In service: 13 April 1942
- Out of service: 30 November 1945
- Stricken: 3 January 1946
- Fate: Sold, 9 September 1947

General characteristics
- Displacement: 195 tons
- Length: 97 ft 1 in (29.59 m)
- Beam: 22 ft (6.7 m)
- Draught: 9 ft 1 in (2.77 m)
- Speed: 10 knots
- Complement: 17
- Armament: two .50 cal (12.7 mm) machine guns

USS Royal (AMc-102) was an Accentor-class coastal minesweeper acquired by the U.S. Navy for the dangerous task of removing mines from minefields laid in the water to prevent ships from passing.

Royal was laid down on 1 November 1941 by Anderson & Cristofani, San Francisco, California, launched 19 March 1942; sponsored by Miss Irma Bianchi; and placed in service on 13 April 1942.

== World War II service ==
Following training in the San Francisco area, Royal remained in the 12th Naval District, based at Treasure Island, California. Through the end of World War II, she operated in that district's patrol force. She was placed out of service on 30 November 1945, struck from the Navy list on 3 January 1946 and sold, via the War Shipping Administration, on 9 September 1947.
