= SS Yukon =

American cargo liner (1898–1946)

History
- Name: (1899-1906) Mexico; (1906-1923) Colon; (1923-1946) Yukon
- Owner: (1899-1906) Ward Line; (1906-1923) Panama Rail Road Co. Inc.; (1923-1946) Alaska Steamship Company
- Port of registry: (1899-1923) New York, United States; (1923-1946) Seattle, United States
- Builder: William Cramp & Sons
- Yard number: 295
- Launched: 1898
- Completed: 1899
- Acquired: 1899
- In service: 1899
- Out of service: 4 February 1946
- Identification: Official number: 92936
- Fate: Ran aground and broke up on 4 February 1946

General characteristics
- Type: Cargo liner
- Tonnage: 5,747 GRT
- Length: 109.73 metres (360 ft 0 in)
- Beam: 15.24 metres (50 ft 0 in)
- Depth: 9.81 metres (32 ft 2 in)
- Installed power: Two triple expansion steam engine
- Propulsion: Two screws
- Speed: 15 knots
- Capacity: 369 passengers
- Crew: 110
- Notes: Two masts and a single funnel

SS Yukon was an American Cargo liner that served for the Ward Line, the Panama Rail Road Co. Inc. and the Alaska Steamship Company until she ran aground and broke up on 4 February 1946.

== Construction ==
Yukon was built as Mexico at the William Cramp & Sons shipyard in Philadelphia, United States and launched in 1898 before being completed the following year. The ship was 109.73 metres (360 ft 0 in) long, had a beam of 15.24 metres (50 ft 0 in) and a depth of 9.81 metres (32 ft 2 in). She was assessed at 5,747 GRT and had two triple expansion steam engine driving two screw propellers. The ship could reach a speed of 15 knots and had two masts and a single funnel.

== Loss ==
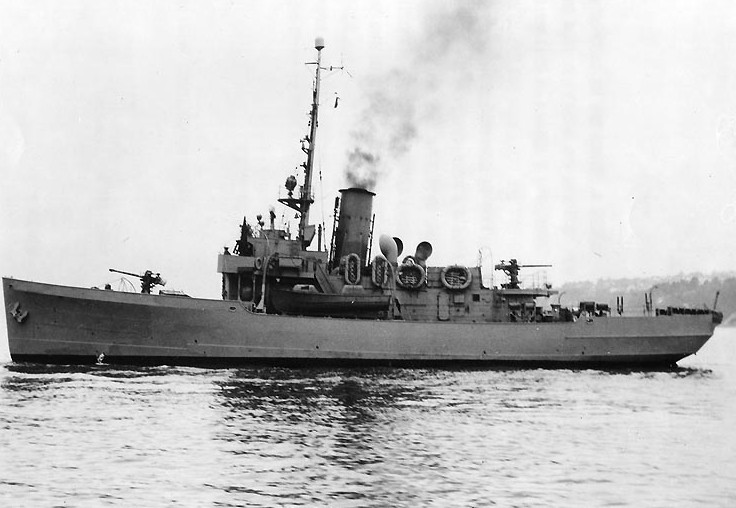
USCGC Onondaga which was the first rescue ship to reach the stricken Yukon.

Yukon departed Seward, Alaska for Seattle, Washington on 3 February 1946 under the command of Captain Christian E. Trondsen. The ship carried 371 passengers and 125 crew, including 184 officers and enlisted men from Fort Richardson, 132 service men and 55 civilians. The following day, Yukon encountered heavy winds and snowfall, which greatly reduced visibility and made it increasingly difficult to navigate through Resurrection Bay. In accordance to maritime law, Yukon sounded her whistle every few minutes to warn nearby ships of their presence to avoid any collisions. At around 4 am on 4 February, Yukon struck rocks off Cape Fairfield on the western side of Johnstone Bay, Prince William Sound, about 35 miles east of Seward. After the Captain was informed that the ship was taking on water, he ordered her beached so she wouldn't sink in the snowstorm which could result in a large loss of life of those on board. Following her beaching, Yukon send out a distress signal which was received in places such as Ketchikan, Kodiak and even as far away as Honolulu. The message was relayed across the Alaska territory but the position of Yukon could not be accurately determined due to the snowstorm obscuring the sky. Meanwhile, the blizzard produced waves in excess of 10 metres (32 ft 10 in) which repeatedly battered the ship and caused the ship's hull to show cracks amidships, indicating that the hull was failing and the ship could break apart. All passengers and crew were therefore urged to head forward and await rescue. Shortly thereafter, the USCGC Onondaga arrived on the scene as it had been patrolling nearby when the distress signal from Yukon was picked up. Onondaga neared within 700 yards of Yukon when Commander W. E. Streichert of Onondaga ordered some small motor whale boats to be lowered and approach the ship to take off as many women and children as possible. Despite the freezing storm conditions, 50 passengers from Yukon were able to be ferried to Onondaga before Yukon broke in half and her stern section sank out of sight. After this, a zip line was erected between the bow of Yukon and the narrow strip of rocky shoreline at the base of the coastside mountain. About 100 passengers were able to evacuate the ship this way and were also provided with some supplies to shelter them from the still ongoing blizzard. More ships began arriving to the scene and conducted further rescue efforts over the next three days to save those still stranded on the bow of the Yukon and the shoreline. Ultimately a power barge was brought onto the narrow beach and near the bow of the Yukon and the remaining survivors were hauled aboard before the barge backed up off the beach and to a shuttle boat which then transferred the survivors to the Onondaga to receive medical attention. All survivors were brought back to Seward by 8 February, but 11 persons (five civilians and six soldiers) lost their lives in the disaster. Some of the crew were later accused of being drunk and looting the passenger's effects during the rescue efforts, with an oiler from Yukon being arrested in Seward when he attempted to sell a pair of stolen earrings to a jeweler. The majority of crew and soldiers on Yukon were however praised for their conduct during the disaster and the assistance they rendered to the civilians aboard.
