= USS Prestige (AMc-97) =

Minesweeper of the United States Navy

History

United States
- Builder: Anderson & Cristofani
- Laid down: 27 May 1941
- Launched: 16 August 1941
- In service: 23 December 1941
- Out of service: 24 June 1946
- Stricken: 19 July 1946
- Fate: transferred to the Maritime Commission 7 November 1947

General characteristics
- Displacement: 228 tons (f.)
- Length: 97 ft (30 m)
- Beam: 21 ft (6.4 m)
- Draught: 9 ft 1 in (2.77 m)
- Speed: 10 knots
- Complement: 17
- Armament: two .50 cal (12.7 mm) machine guns

USS Prestige (AMc-97) was an Accentor-class coastal minesweeper acquired by the U.S. Navy for the dangerous task of removing mines from minefields laid in the water to prevent ships from passing.

Prestige was laid down 27 May 1941 by Anderson & Cristofani, San Francisco, California; launched 16 August 1941; sponsored by Miss Jill Anderson, and placed in service 23 December 1941.

== World War II service ==
Following shakedown, Prestige reported to Pearl Harbor, Hawaii, 11 March 1942, and conducted minesweeping operations in Hawaiian waters in 1942 and 1943. Upon commissioning 13 December 1944, she commenced her conversion from a coastal minesweeper to a locator of underwater ordnance.

After conversion, she departed Pearl Harbor 8 July 1945 and proceeded via Johnston Island, Majuro, Eniwetok, Saipan and Okinawa to Sasebo, Japan, where she arrived 13 September. From September through December, she conducted minesweeping operations at Wakanoura-Kii, Honshū area, and at Fukuoka, Kyūshū-Korea area.

Arriving San Diego, California, 2 June 1946, Prestige decommissioned there 24 June 1946. She was struck from the Naval Vessel Register 19 July 1946, and transferred to the Maritime Commission 7 November 1947. Prestige received one battle star for World War II service.
