= USS YP-72 =

U.S. World War II patrol boat

- USS YP-72, 1942-1943

History

United States Navy
- Name: YP-72
- Builder: J.M. Martinac, Tacoma, Washington
- Launched: 1940
- Sponsored by: W.D. Suryan, Juneau, Alaska
- Acquired: acquired by the U.S. Navy, 6 November 1940
- Commissioned: 28 November 1940
- Stricken: 30 March 1943
- Identification: ON 239470
- Honours and awards: American Defense Service Medal; American Campaign Medal; Asiatic-Pacific Campaign Medal; World War II Victory Medal
- Fate: Struck a reef, 17 February 1943; abandoned as total loss, 23 February 1943

General characteristics
- Tonnage: 152 gross register tons
- Length: 125.6 ft (38.3 m) o/a
- Beam: 23.75 ft (7.24 m)
- Draught: 10.33 ft (3.15 m)
- Installed power: 400 bhp
- Propulsion: one Atlas single shaft diesel engine,
- Armament: 1 x 3"/23 caliber gun; 2 x .50-caliber machine guns; 2 x .30 caliber Lewis machine guns; 2 x 20mm anti-aircraft guns; depth charge

The USS YP-72 (ex-Cavalcade) was a converted fishing vessel which served as an auxiliary patrol boat in the U.S. Navy during World War II.

== History ==
She was built in Tacoma, Washington, by J.M. Martinac for the benefit of W.D. Suryan of Juneau, Territory of Alaska. She was wood-hulled. In 1940, she was completed, configured as a purse seiner, and christened Cavalcade. On 6 November 1940, she was acquired by the United States Navy and commissioned at Puget Sound Navy Yard on 28 November 1940. She was designated as a Yard patrol boat (YP). Her initial armament consisted of a single 3"/23 caliber gun. She was assigned along with two other converted fishing vessels (YP-73 and YP-74) to the newly created Alaska Sector of the 13th Naval District under Captain R. C. Parker who was tasked with building up the nearly absent Naval defenses of Alaska and the Aleutian Islands. On 31 March 1941, she left Bremerton for her new station at Dutch Harbor where she and her fellow YPs joined the former Coast Guard cutter Onondaga and the gunboat Charleston to form what was colloquially called the "Alaskan Navy." She served as the flagship of the YP fleet under Commandeer Charles E. ("Squeaky") Anderson, USNR, a "local character of infinite resource, energy, and cunning." Her armaments were upgraded in December 1941, adding two .50 caliber machine guns and two .30 caliber Lewis machine guns; and again in late 1942 with two 20mm anti-aircraft guns and depth charge capability. On 17 February 1943, she was grounded on an uncharted reef in Kuluk Bay, Adak Island at 51°52′N 176°39′W (another report erroneously indicates that she was grounded at the Spruce Cape entrance to Kodiak, Kodiak Island although this is the fate of YP-73). She was deemed a total loss on 23 February 1943 and struck from the Naval List on 30 March 1943.
