= USS Reliable (AMc-100) =

Minesweeper of the United States Navy

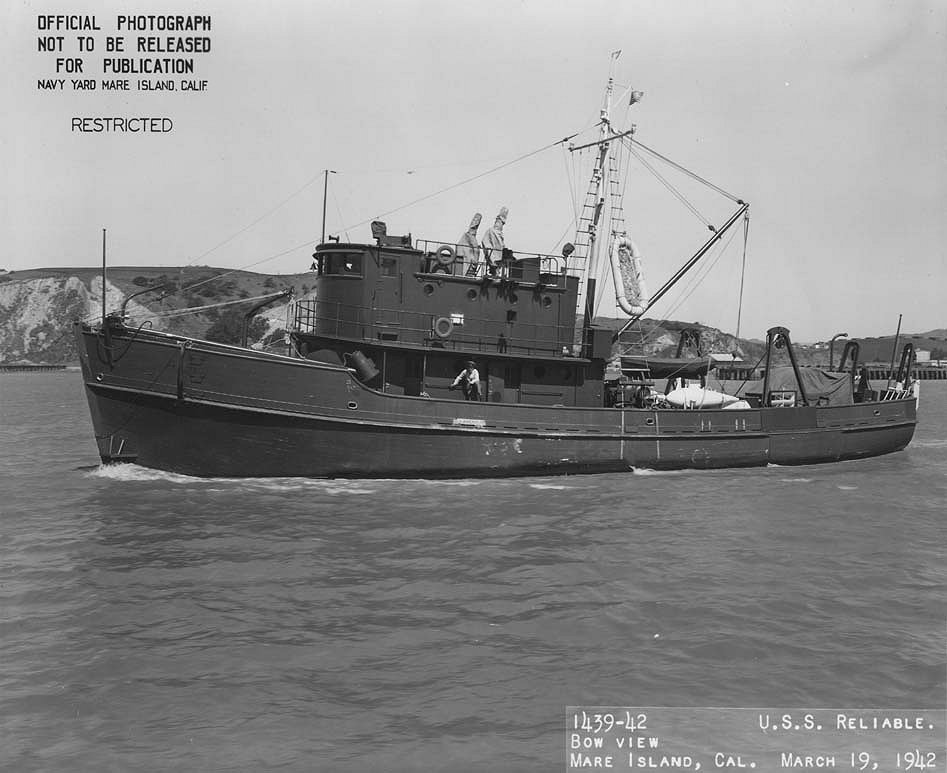

History

United States
- Name: Reliable
- Operator: United States Navy
- Builder: Anderson & Cristofani
- Laid down: 18 August 1941
- Launched: 14 February 1942
- In service: 9 March 1942
- Out of service: date unknown
- Stricken: 19 September 1945
- Fate: Transferred to the War Shipping Administration, 11 October 1946

General characteristics
- Displacement: 195 tons
- Length: 97 ft 1 in (29.59 m)
- Beam: 22 ft (6.7 m)
- Draught: 9 ft 1 in (2.77 m)
- Speed: 10 knots
- Complement: 17
- Armament: two machine guns

USS Reliable (AMc-100) was an Accentor-class coastal minesweeper acquired by the U.S. Navy for the dangerous task of removing mines from minefields laid in the water to prevent ships from passing.

Reliable, a coastal minesweeper, was laid down 18 August 1941 by Anderson & Cristofani, San Francisco, California; launched 14 February 1942; sponsored by Miss Ruth Schmidt; and placed in service at Mare Island Navy Yard 9 March 1942.

== World War II service ==
After training at Local Defense School, Treasure Island, California, Reliable departed San Francisco 24 March for her homeport, San Pedro, California. Assigned to the Western Sea Frontier, she operated as a unit of the San Pedro Section, Naval Local Defense Force, 11th Naval District. Throughout World War II she ensured the safe passage of shipping in and out of Los Angeles Harbor.

Reliable was struck from the Navy list 19 September 1945 and transferred to the War Shipping Administration 11 October 1946.
