= USS Rocket (AMc-101) =

Accentor-class minesweeper

History

United States
- Operator: US Navy
- Builder: Anderson & Cristofani
- Laid down: 6 September 1941
- Launched: 23 February 1942
- In service: 25 March 1942
- Out of service: 30 November 1945
- Stricken: 3 January 1946
- Fate: transferred to WSA for disposal 30 July 1946

General characteristics
- Displacement: 195 tons
- Length: 97 ft 1 in (29.59 m)
- Beam: 22 ft (6.7 m)
- Draught: 8 ft 6 in (2.59 m)
- Speed: 10 knots
- Complement: 17
- Armament: two .50 cal (12.7 mm) machine guns

USS Rocket (AMc-101) was an Accentor-class coastal minesweeper acquired by the U.S. Navy for the dangerous task of removing mines from minefields laid in the water to prevent ships from passing.

Rocket a coastal minesweeper, was laid down 6 September 1941 by Anderson & Cristofani, San Francisco, California, launched on 23 February 1942, sponsored by Mrs. N. Bruly of San Francisco; and placed in service 25 March 1942.

== World War II service ==
After shakedown along the California coast and training at the Local Defense School, Treasure Island, California, the new coastal minesweeper was assigned to the Western Sea Frontier Force. Transferred on 16 March 1943 to the Naval Local Defense Force 12th Naval District, she continued her sweeps and patrols to protect San Francisco Harbor, a major departure point for men and materiel to the Pacific Ocean fighting fronts.

The war officially ended on 2 September and she was placed out of service on 30 November 1945 and struck from the Navy list on 3 January 1946. She was transferred to War Shipping Administration (WSA) for disposal 30 July 1946.
