= Anderson & Cristofani =

Shipyard in San Francisco, California, United States

Coordinates: 37.73266°N 122.374928°W

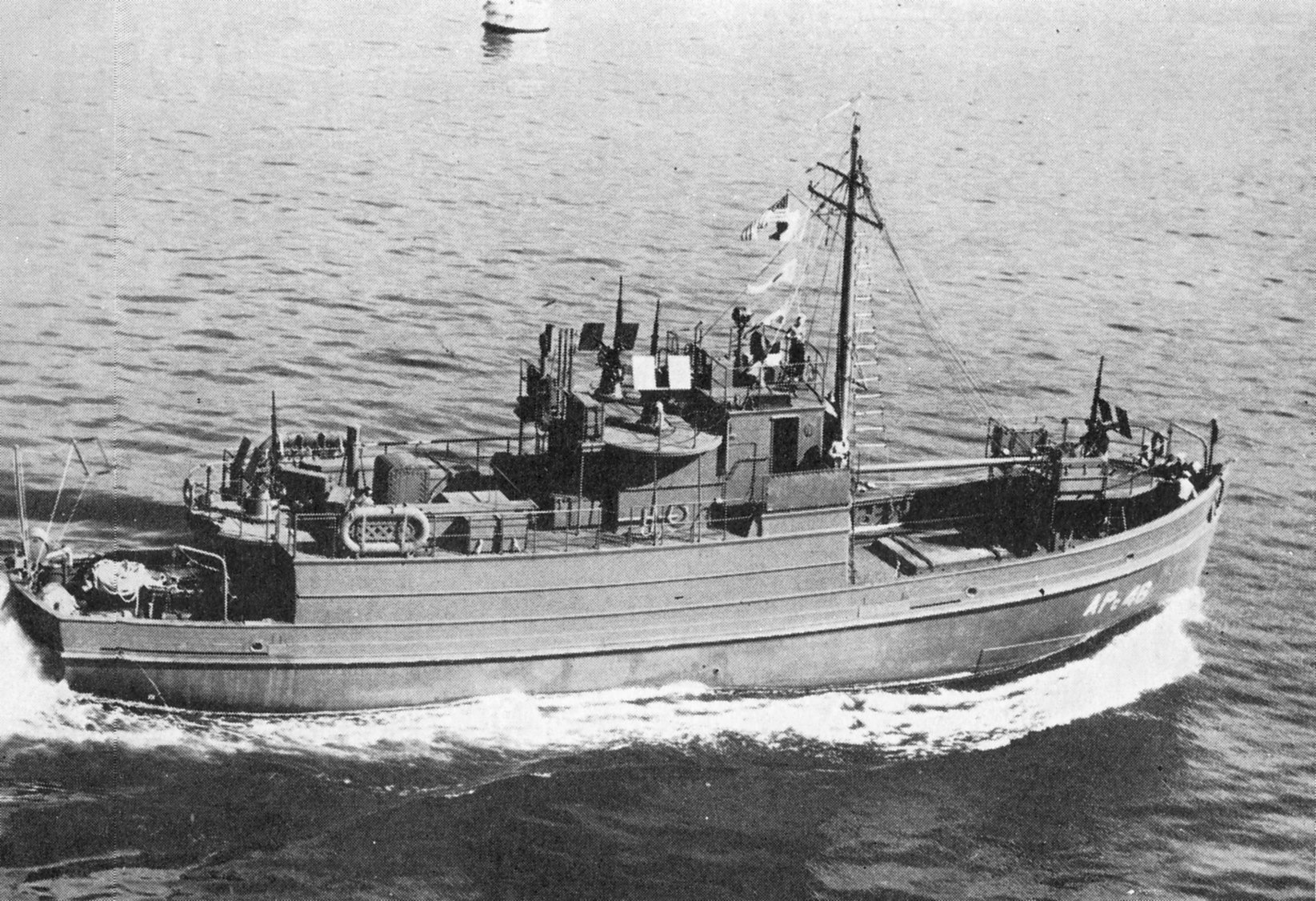
US Navy APc-1 Class Small Coastal Transport

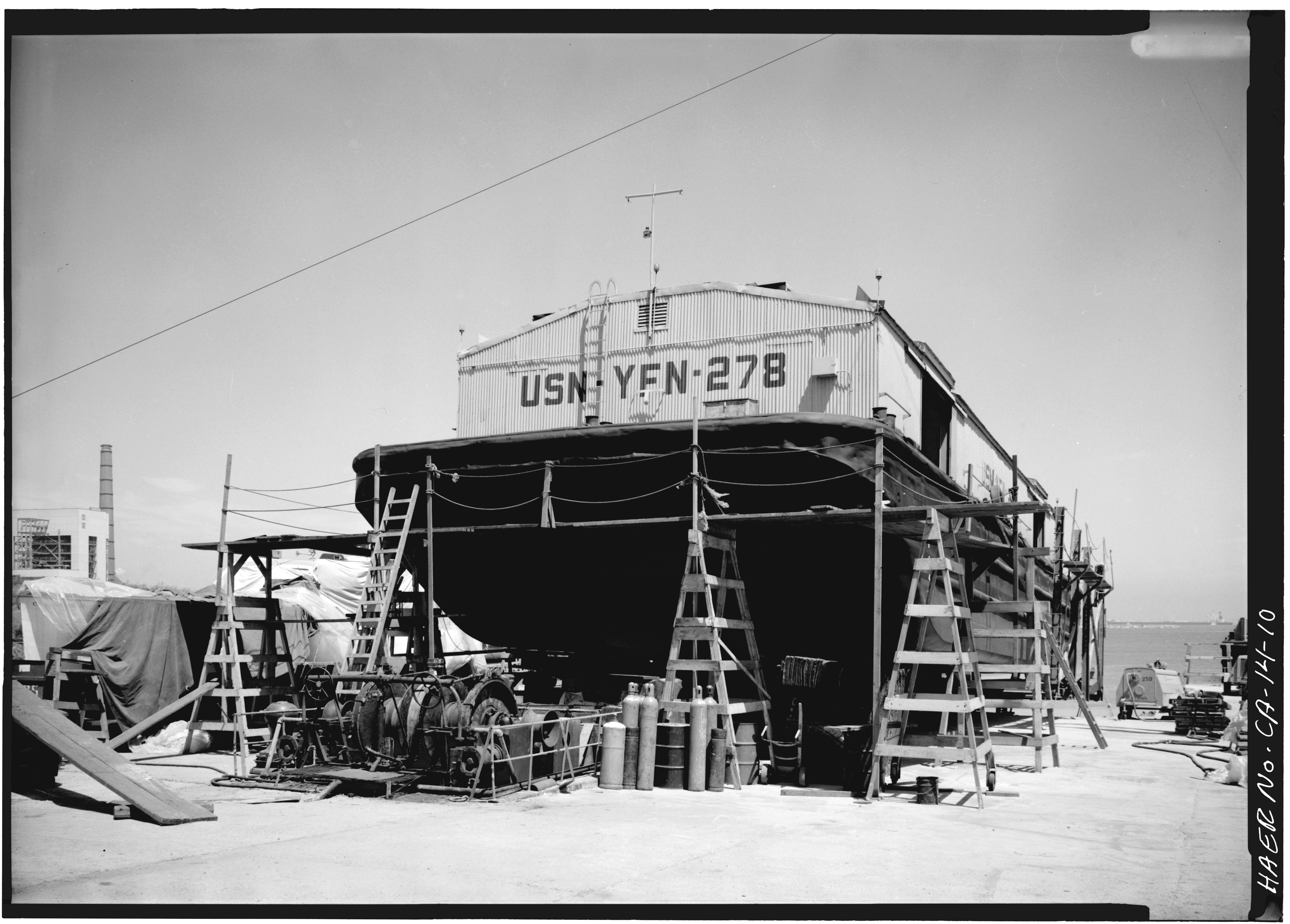
Navy Barge YFN-278 being repaired at Anderson & Cristofani shipyard in 1975

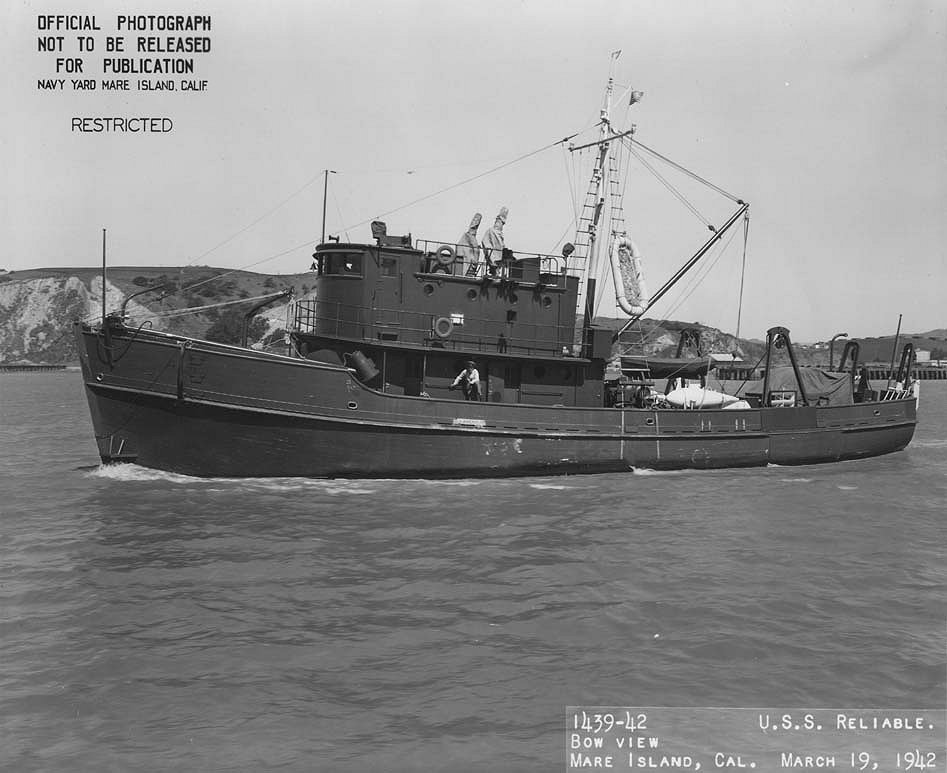
USS Reliable (AMc-100) built at Anderson & Cristofani

Anderson & Cristofani was a wooden shipbuilding company in San Francisco, California. To support the World War 2 demand for ships Anderson & Cristofani shipyard switched over to military construction and built: US Navy APC coastal transports, tugboats, Patrol Boats and Minesweepers.

== History ==
Founded by Walter Anderson and Alfred Christofani. Anderson & Cristofani was started the early 1870s building San Francisco Bay scow schooners, which they built till the mid-1930s. Anderson & Cristofani built pleasure craft and workboats. The boatyard was at 900 Innes Avenue, in the India Basin at Hunter's Point. Henry P. Anderson, a shipwright from Denmark first worked at John Dirks’ boatyard when he arrived in 1893. Anderson joined Alf Cristofani in 1926 to form the Anderson & Cristofani Boatyard. The Anderson & Cristofani boatyard closed in 1988 and was taken over by Allemand Brothers boat repair, run by Rene Flip Allemand and John Allemand, started in 1946. Allemand Brothers boatyard closed in 2002. The land sold to property developers, but no project was built. The city of San Francisco purchased the land in 1989 (renting to the Allemand Brothers). In 2014 the city started the planning for the India Basin Shoreline Park at the site. The boatyard was at 900 Innes Ave, San Francisco.

== Small coastal transport ==
Anderson & Cristofani built troopships of the APc-1-class small coastal transports design. The ship had a displacement of 100 tons light, 258 tons fully loaded with a length of 103 feet (31 m), a beam of 21 feet (6.4 m), a draft of 9 feet (2.7 m), and a top speed of 10 knots (19 km/h; 12 mph). The crew was composed of 3 officers and 22 enlisted men and could transport up to 66 troops. The vessels had a large boom with a capacity of 3 tons. They were armed with four single 20 mm AA guns. the APc-1 class had a fuel capacity of 145 barrels (6,100 US gal) of diesel fuel. They were powered by one Atlas engine 6HM2124 diesel engine with a single propeller creating 400 shp (300 kW). For electrical they had two diesel 30 kW 120V D.C. service generators. The ship moved troops in the Pacific War. A notable ship was USS APc-25.

== Accentor-class minesweeper ==
Anderson & Cristofani built Accentor-class minesweepers, which had a similar design as the APc-1-class small coastal transports, but were fitted for removing mines:

- USS Prestige (AMc-97)
- USS Progress (AMc-98)
- USS Reliable (AMc-100)
- USS Rocket (AMc-101)
- USS Royal (AMc-102)

== Large harbor tug ==
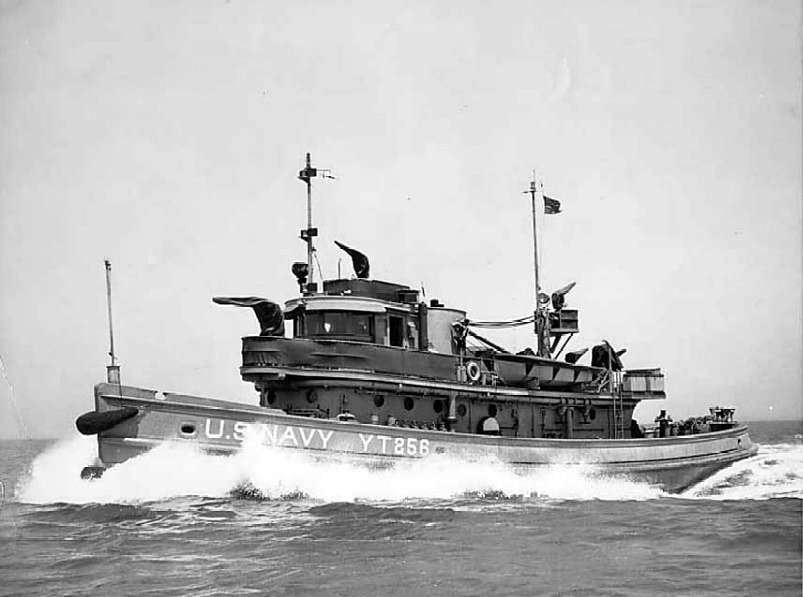
USS Menoquet (YTB-256) Tugboat in the South Pacific in 1944

Anderson & Cristofani built US Navy Large harbor tugboats, a Cahto-class district harbor tug these were 410 long tons and a length of 110 ft. Harbor tugs (YT) were named after American Indian tribes:

- USS Arivaca (YT 259)
- USS Menoquet (YTB-256)
- USS Minooka (YT 257)
- USS Moanahonga (YT 258)

== Patrol Vessels ==
- USS YP-153 built in 1936
- C-60162 US Navy Patrol Boat 41 tons and 65-feet built in 1944

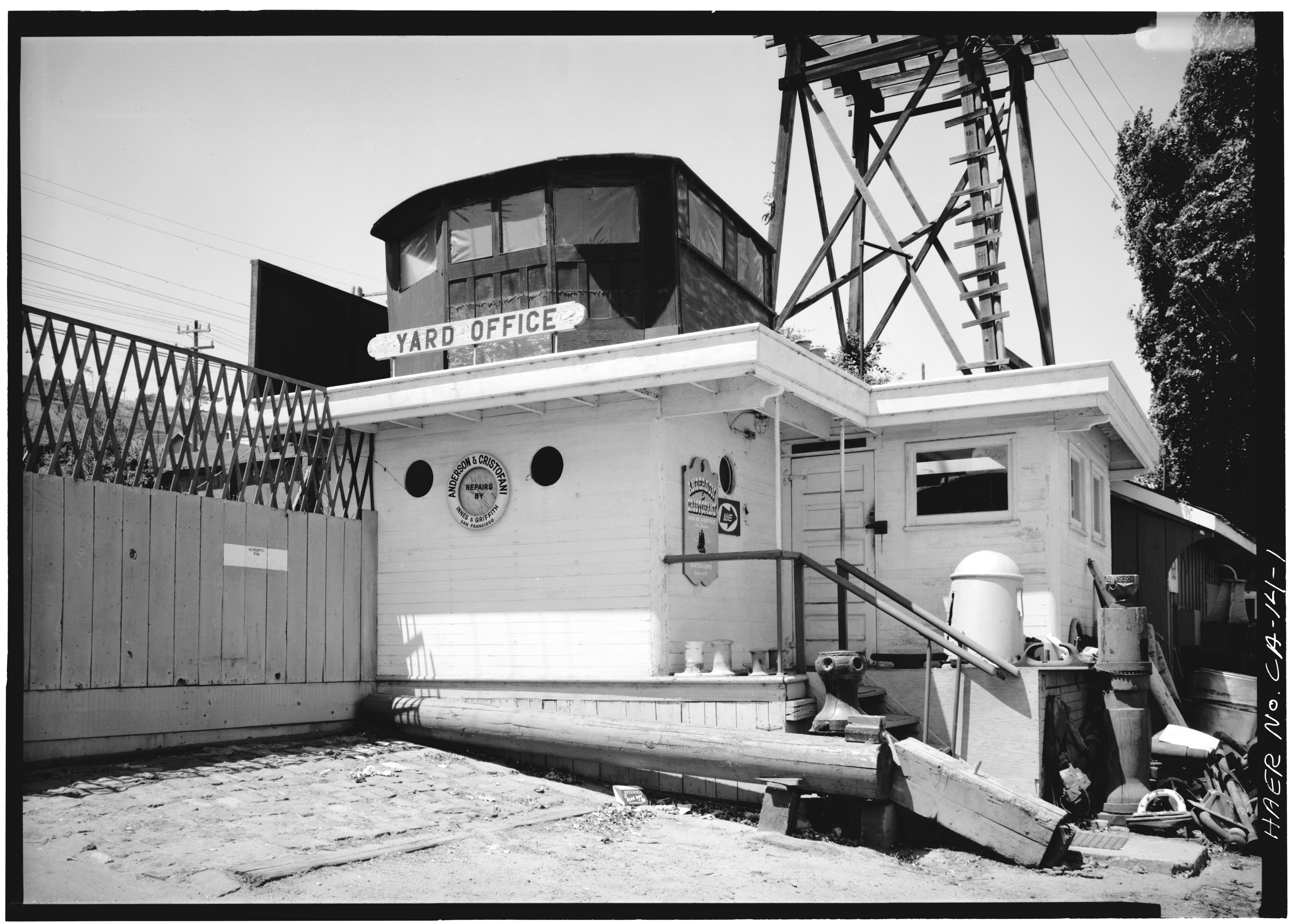
Anderson & Cristofani office

== See also ==
- California during World War II
- Maritime history of California
- Union Iron Works
- Richmond Shipyards
- Kneass Boat Works
- Pacific Bridge Company
