= USS YP-74 =

- USS YP-74, 1940-1943

History

United States Navy
- Name: YP-74
- Launched: April 1937
- Sponsored by: M.C. Wright, Seattle, Washington
- Completed: 1937
- Acquired: purchased by the U.S. Navy, November 1940
- Commissioned: December 1940
- Identification: ON 236639
- Honours and awards: American Defense Service Medal; American Campaign Medal; Asiatic-Pacific Campaign Medal; World War II Victory Medal
- Fate: Sunk after collision, 6 September 1942

General characteristics
- Tonnage: 101 GRT
- Length: 72.1 ft (22.0 m) o/a
- Beam: 20.3 ft (6.2 m)
- Draught: 9.7 ft (3.0 m)
- Installed power: 200 bhp (150 kW)
- Propulsion: diesel engine
- Complement: 23
- Armament: 1 x 3"/23 caliber gun

USS YP-74 (ex-Endeavor) was a converted fishing vessel which served as an auxiliary patrol boat in the U.S. Navy during World War II.

== History ==
She was built in Seattle, Washington for the benefit of M.C. Wright of Seattle. She was launched in April 1937, completed later in the year, configured as a purse seiner, and christened Endeavor. In November 1940, she was purchased by the United States Navy and commissioned in December 1940. She was designated as a Yard patrol boat (YP). Her armament consisted of a single 3"/23 caliber gun. She was assigned along with two other converted fishing vessels (YP-72 and YP-73) to the newly created Alaska Sector of the 13th Naval District under Captain R. C. Parker who was tasked with building up the nearly absent Naval defenses of Alaska and the Aleutian Islands. In December 1941, Lieutenant John Backland USNR was named commanding officer. Once in Alaska, she and her fellow YPs joined the former Coast Guard cutter Onondaga and the gunboat Charleston to form what was colloquially called the "Alaskan Navy." Commandeer Charles E. ("Squeaky") Anderson, USNR, a "local character of infinite resource, energy, and cunning", was responsible for the YP fleet taking YP-72 as his flagship. In March 1942, Lieutenant George White Snyder was named commanding officer. On 6 September 1942, while en route with a group of Seabees, she collided with Alaska Steam Ship Company freighter SS Derblay in the fog off Unimak Island and sank at 54°20′N 164°50′W. Although there were 21 survivors, 2 crew members and 2 passengers did not survive. She was struck from the Naval List.
