= USCGC Sedge =

United States Coast Guard vessel used during World War II

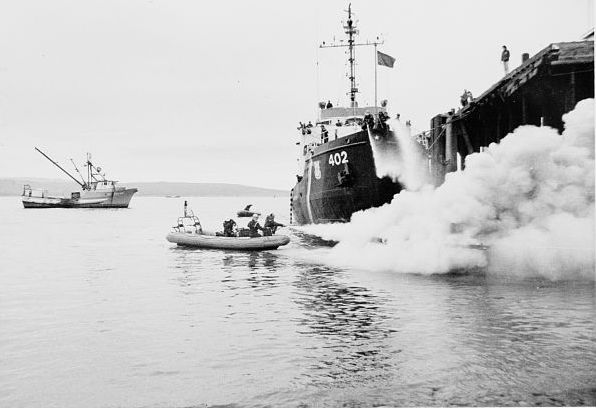
- USCGC Sedge in a fire-fighting drill

History

United States
- Name: USCGC Sedge
- Builder: Marine Iron and Shipbuilding Company, Duluth, Minnesota
- Cost: $865,411
- Laid down: 6 October 1943
- Launched: 27 November 1943
- Commissioned: 5 July 1944
- Decommissioned: 15 November 2002
- Identification: Signal letters NODU
- Fate: Transferred to Nigerian Navy

Nigeria
- Name: NNS Kyanwa
- Namesake: "Cat" (Kyanwa) in Hausa language
- Identification: MMSI 657708000; Callsign A501
- Motto: "Support and Vigilance"
- Status: Active
- Badge: A golden circular frame with a tan feline cat at center, two blue tinted scrolls on top and bottom

General characteristics as built in 1943
- Class & type: Iris-class buoy tender
- Displacement: 935 tons
- Length: 180 ft (55 m)
- Beam: 37 ft (11 m)
- Draft: 12 feet (3.7 m)
- Propulsion: 2 × Cooper-Bessemer GND-8 Diesel engines
- Speed: 14 knots (26 km/h; 16 mph) maximum
- Range: 8,000 nmi (15,000 km; 9,200 mi) at 13 kn (24 km/h; 15 mph)
- Complement: 6 officers, 74 enlisted men
- Armament: 2 x 20 mm guns; 3 in (76 mm)/50 gun

USCGC Sedge (WAGL-402/WLB-402) was an Iris-class 180-foot seagoing buoy tender operated by the United States Coast Guard. She served in the Pacific during World War II and in Alaska during the rest of her Coast Guard career. Sedge was decommissioned in 2002 and transferred to the Nigerian Navy where she is still active as NNS Kyanwa.

== Construction and characteristics ==
Sedge was built at the Marine Iron and Shipbuilding Company in Duluth, Minnesota for the United States Coast Guard. Her keel was laid down on 6 October 1943, she was launched on 27 November 1943, and commissioned on 5 July 1944. Her original cost was $865,411. She was the thirty-fifth of the 39 180-foot buoy tenders built during World War II.

Her hull was constructed of welded steel plates framed with steel I-beams. As originally built, Sedge was 180 feet (55 m) long, with a beam of 37 feet (11 m), and a draft of 12 feet (3.7 m). Her displacement was 935 tons. While her overall dimensions remained the same over her career, the addition of new equipment raised her displacement to 1,025 tons by the end of her Coast Guard service.

She was designed to perform light ice-breaking. Her hull was reinforced with an "ice belt" of thicker steel around her waterline to protect it from punctures. Similarly, her bow was reinforced and shaped to ride over ice in order to crush it with the weight of the ship.

Sedge had a single 5-blade propeller 8.5 feet (2.6 m) in diameter. It was driven by a diesel-electric propulsion system. Two Cooper-Bessemer GND-8 4-cycle 8-cylinder diesel engines produced 600 horsepower (450 kW) each. They provided power to two Westinghouse generators. The electricity from the generators ran an electric motor which turned the propeller.

She had a single cargo boom which had the ability to lift 20 tons onto her buoy deck.

The ship's fuel tanks had a capacity of approximately 28,875 US gallons (109,300 L). Sedge's unrefueled range was 8,000 nautical miles (15,000 km) at 13 knots (24 km/h; 15 mph), 12,000 nautical miles (22,000 km) at 12 knots (22 km/h; 14 mph), and 17,000 nautical miles (31,000 km) at 8.3 knots (15.4 km/h; 9.6 mph). Her potable water tanks had a capacity of 30,499 US gallons (115,450 L). Considering dry storage capacity and other factors, her at-sea endurance was 21 days.

Her wartime complement was 6 officers and 74 enlisted men. By 1964 this was reduced to 5 officers, 2 warrant officers, and 48 enlisted personnel.

Sedge was initially armed with a 3-inch (76 mm)/50 caliber gun mounted behind the pilot house. She also had two 20 mm (0.79 in) guns, one mounted on top of the wheelhouse and one on the aft deck. Two racks of depth charges were also mounted on the aft deck. All of her on-deck armament was removed in 1966, leaving only small arms for law enforcement actions.

At the time of construction, Sedge was designated WAGL, an auxiliary vessel, lighthouse tender. The designation system was changed in 1965, and she was re-designated WLB, an oceangoing buoy tender.

The ship's namesake was the sedge, a family of grass-like flowering plants.

== U.S. Coast Guard service ==
After commissioning, Sedge was assigned to Honolulu, Hawaii, but she served across the Pacific during World War II tending buoys and fleet moorings in Guam, Okinawa, Anguar, Midway, Pearl Harbor, and Shanghai.

The end of World War II in 1945 created intense pressure from conscripted members of the armed forces and their families for rapid demobilization. The Coast Guard lost so many sailors that it was forced to decommission several ships for lack of crews to sail them. Sedge was decommissioned on 26 February 1947, for lack of personnel. The ship was recommissioned at Seattle on 14 April 1950, and assigned to Kodiak, Alaska, replacing USCGC Cedar which was decommissioned. In addition to her duties maintaining aids to navigation, Sedge was active on rescue missions. She searched for marooned sailors, plane crashes, and disabled vessels in the area around Kodiak.

In the summer of 1956 Sedge was dispatched to Barrow, Alaska for icebreaking duties to allow cargo ships to reach the Arctic coast. At one point she was locked in the sea ice for three days. The cargo shipments Sedge enabled were related to the construction of the Distant Early Warning Line sites in Barrow and surrounding areas. Sedge earned the Arctic Service Medal for her deployment to Barrow.

On 15 July 1957 Sedge was transferred to Cordova, Alaska. Her work of maintaining aids to navigation, and search and rescue remained unchanged. In October 1962 she rescued the six-man crew of the capsized Alaska Roustabout in the Gulf of Alaska. They had been floating on a life raft for five days.

The 1964 Alaska earthquake was generated a series of tsunamis in Prince William Sound. At 8:20 pm on 27 March 1964 Sedge grounded in Orca Inlet near Cordova when the water dropped 27 feet (8.2 m) between waves. She refloated when the water came back in. In the aftermath of the earthquake, Sedge evacuated people who were stranded by the destruction.

In April 1973 Sedge sailed for the Coast Guard Yard in Curtis Bay, Maryland for a major renovation. She was replaced in Cordova by USCGC Sorrel. Sedge received the more extensive of the two mid-life renovations given to the 180-foot buoy tenders. Corroded hull plates were replaced with fresh steel. New electrical wiring and switchboards were installed. Fresh water and sewage pipes were replaced. The main electrical motor and its control systems were overhauled. A bow thruster was installed to improve maneuverability. Crew quarters were increased in size and modernized. When her yard visit was complete in June 1974, she sailed to her new homeport, Homer, Alaska, where she arrived on 8 November 1974.

During her time in Homer, Sedge continued to be responsible for maintenance of aids to navigation, and search and rescue missions, In addition, enforcing fisheries laws, particularly against foreign fleets grew in importance as did oil spill response. In February 1976, Sedge seized the Korean fishing vessel Dong Won 709 45 miles (72 km) north of Sitka for fishing inside U.S. waters.

On 2 July 1987, the tanker Glacier Bay struck a submerged object in Montague Strait and spilled 125,000 gallons of oil. The ship was en route to a refinery in Cook Inlet from Valdez, Alaska, when the incident occurred. Sedge was dispatched as the floating command center for the 21 vessels trying to recover the oil. On 24 March 1989, another tanker out of Valdez met a worse fate. Exxon Valdez ran aground on Bligh Reef in Prince William Sound spilling 10,800,000 US gallons (41,000 m^{3}) of crude oil. Sedge was the first Coast Guard cutter to respond to the scene. An Open Water Oil Containment and Recovery System was embarked and Sedge skimmed more than 8,900 barrels of oil from the sea. At various points during the spill response she also conducted shoreline surveys and air traffic control duties. In 1990 Sedge's crew constructed the lighted beacon that now marks Bligh Reef.

Other oil spill responses included fire fighting in Cook Inlet when the Steelhead platform owned by Marathon Oil had a blow-out in December 1988. In January 1989, a 280-foot (85 m) barge loaded with 2 million gallons of diesel fuel began sinking in high seas and stormy weather. Attempts to regain control of the barge proved unsuccessful in the bad weather. She leaked half her cargo while drifting for 17 days. At this point the Coast Guard decided that it was less risky to sink her far from shore than to chance another large oil spill on the coast while trying to save what was left of the barge. Sedge sank her with 1,500 rounds of 20 mm gunfire 12 miles (19 km) off the Semidi Islands.

Sedge underwent a major renovation in a Bellingham, Washington shipyard from October 1989 to April 1990. Two new EMD 8-645 main engines were installed. Her generators, refrigeration, and propeller shaft seals were replaced. Her crew quarters were modernized and asbestos was removed. This renovation cost approximately $2 million.

The Coast Guard planned for an orderly replacement of its World War II-vintage buoy tenders, retiring the older vessels as new ships were launched. Sedge was decommissioned as part of this process at a ceremony in Homer, Alaska on 15 November 2002. Sedge earned several awards during her Coast Guard service including the World War II Victory medal, Navy Occupation Service medal, three Coast Guard Unit Commendations, two Meritorious Unit Commendations, Special Operations Service ribbon, Arctic Service medal, and six E-ribbons.

== Nigerian service ==
Theft of crude oil in the Niger Delta region of Nigeria was significant in the early 2000s. ChevronTexaco reported that it lost $500 million to civil disturbances in Nigeria between 2002 and 2003. To combat the shipment of stolen oil, the U.S. Security Assistance Program arranged to transfer four 180-foot buoy-tenders to the Nigerian Navy. Sedge was the first of these. She was commissioned in the Nigerian Navy on 21 December 2002. The ship was renamed NNS Kyanwa and given a new pennant number, A501.

Kyanwa has been used to suppress shipments of stolen oil, and more recently to suppress pirate attacks on legitimate shipping. Kyanwa was part of Operation Tsare Teku, a Nigerian naval response to growing piracy, when it was launched in April 2016. She has been less effective than more modern ships because the small pirate vessels are considerably faster than the former buoy tender. She was dropped from later phases of Tsare Teku. The ship participated in the multinational "Exercise Grand Africa Nemo" in 2020.
