= USS YP-93 =

History
- Name: YP-93 (ex-Margaret F)
- Completed: 1937
- Acquired: 14 April 1941
- Honours and awards: American Defense Service Medal; American Campaign Medal; World War II Victory Medal
- Fate: Sold, 1946

General characteristics
- Type: Patrol boat
- Displacement: 130 gross register tons
- Length: 76 ft (23 m) o/a
- Beam: 20 ft (6.1 m)
- Draught: 9.75 ft (2.97 m)
- Installed power: 200 shp
- Propulsion: one Diesel engine; single screw

USS YP-93 was a converted fishing vessel which served as an auxiliary patrol boat in the U.S. Navy during World War II.

== History ==
She was laid down in Seattle, Washington. She was completed in 1937 and named Margaret F. On 14 April 1941, she was acquired by the U.S. Navy, designated as a Yard Patrol Craft (YP), and assigned to the 13th Naval District. She was one of the initial ships assigned to the Ralph C. Parker's Alaskan Sector of the 13th Naval District colloquially known as the "Alaskan Navy".

On 8 May 1946, she was struck from the Naval List, transferred to the United States Maritime Administration, and sold later in the year.

She is not to be confused with similarly designated USS YP-93 (ex-Zumbrota) built in 1914.
