= USS YP-86 =

History

United States
- Name: YP-86 (ex-Pacific Fisher)
- Builder: Martinolich Shipbuilding Company, Tacoma
- Completed: 1937
- Acquired: 7 April 1941
- Decommissioned: 27 June 1944
- Out of service: 1944
- Stricken: 18 July 1944
- Identification: code letters: NBSO
- Honours and awards: American Defense Service Medal; Asiatic–Pacific Campaign Medal; World War II Victory Medal
- Fate: Sold to private sector, 1945
- Notes: Acquired by the U.S. Navy from the private sector.

General characteristics
- Type: Seiner
- Displacement: 113 gross tons 77 net tons
- Length: 73.5 ft (22.4 m) o/a
- Beam: 9.75 ft (2.97 m)
- Propulsion: one Diesel engine, single propeller, 200 shp

YP-86 was a converted fishing vessel that served as an auxiliary patrol boat in the U.S. Navy during World War II.

== History ==
She was laid down as a seiner in the Tacoma shipyard of the Martinolich Shipbuilding Company. She was completed in 1937 and named Pacific Fisher (ON 236159). On 7 April 1941, she was acquired by the Navy and designated as a Yard Patrol (YP). She was one of the initial ships assembled by Captain Ralph C. Parker for the Alaskan Sector, Northwest Sea Frontier, 13th Naval District—colloquially known as the "Alaskan Navy". She spent her entire career serving in the Aleutian Islands during the Aleutian Islands Campaign.

YP-86 was decommissioned on 27 June 1944 and struck from the Naval Vessel Register on 18 July 1944. On 6 October 1944, she was transferred to the United States Maritime Administration. In 1945, she was sold to Coastwise Fisheries of Seattle, Washington. In 1961, she was sold to Merrill W. Henington of Seldovia, Alaska.
