= USS Progress =

Minesweeper of the United States Navy

History

United States
- Operator: US Navy
- Builder: Anderson & Cristofani
- Laid down: 28 May 1941
- Launched: 6 September 1941
- In service: 24 January 1942
- Out of service: 3 July 1946
- Stricken: 31 July 1946
- Fate: Turned over to the Maritime Commission 19 December 1946

General characteristics
- Displacement: 195 tons
- Length: 97 ft 1 in (29.59 m)
- Beam: 22 ft (6.7 m)
- Draught: 8 ft 6 in (2.59 m)
- Speed: 10 knots
- Complement: 17
- Armament: two .50 cal (12.7 mm) machine guns, four .30 cal (7.62 mm) guns

USS Progress (AMc-98) was an Accentor-class coastal minesweeper acquired by the U.S. Navy for the dangerous task of removing mines from minefields laid in the water to prevent ships from passing.

Progress was laid down 28 May 1941 by Anderson & Cristofani, San Francisco, California, hunched 6 September 1941; sponsored by Miss Marilyn Lewis, and placed in service at Mare Island Navy Yard 24 January 1942.

== World War II service ==
Progress was immediately assigned to the 14th Naval District and reported for duty 11 March 1942 at Pearl Harbor. She patrolled Hawaiian waters throughout World War II. Progress decommissioned at Pearl Harbor 3 July 1946 was struck from the Naval Vessel Register 31 July 1946; and was turned over to the Maritime Commission 19 December 1946.
