= USS YP-153 =

- pre-World War II photo of YP-153, as Waldero

History
- Name: USS YP-153
- Builder: Anderson & Cristofani, San Francisco
- Completed: 1936
- Acquired: 18 December 1941
- Stricken: 8 May 1946
- Honors and awards: American Campaign Medal; World War II Victory Medal
- Fate: Sold, 1946
- Notes: Call sign: NAPE

General characteristics
- Type: Patrol boat
- Length: 78.1 ft (23.8 m) o/a
- Beam: 23.33 ft (7.11 m)
- Installed power: 300 SHP
- Propulsion: Cooper-Bessemer Diesel engine; 1 × screw

USS YP-153 was a converted fishing vessel which served as an auxiliary patrol boat in the U.S. Navy during World War II.

== History ==
She was laid down as seiner at the San Francisco shipyard of Anderson & Cristofani. In 1936, she was completed and named Waldero. On 18 December 1941, she was acquired by the U.S. Navy, designated as a Yard Patrol Craft (YP), and assigned to the 13th Naval District. She was one of the initial ships assigned to Ralph C. Parker's Alaskan Sector of the 13th Naval District colloquially known as the "Alaskan Navy".

On 8 May 1946, she was struck from the Naval List and sold later in the year.
