= USS Menoquet =

Cahto-class district harbor tug

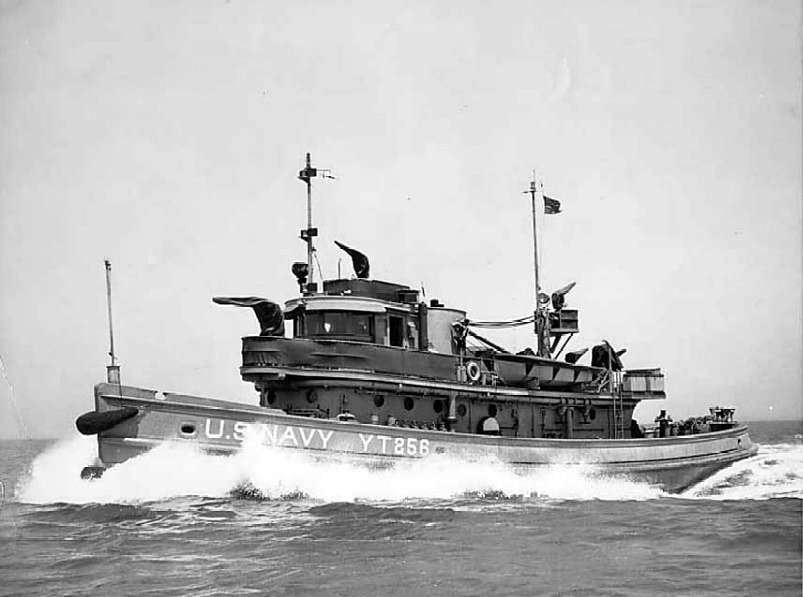
- Menoquet underway in the South Pacific, circa 1944.

History

United States
- Name: USS Menoquet (YTM-256)
- Builder: Anderson & Cristofani, San Francisco, CA
- Laid down: 11 September 1943
- Launched: 5 February 1944
- Sponsored by: Mrs. Alfred Cristofani
- In service: 7 June 1944
- Reclassified: District Harbor Tug, Large YTB-256 15 May 1944
- Stricken: 1 May 1959
- Identification: IMO number: 6513944
- Fate: unknown

General characteristics
- Class & type: Cahto-class district harbor tug
- Displacement: 410 long tons (417 t)
- Length: 110 ft 0 in (33.53 m)
- Beam: 27 ft 0 in (8.23 m)
- Draft: 11 ft 4 in (3.45 m)
- Speed: 12 knots (22 km/h; 14 mph)
- Complement: 12
- Armament: 2 × .50-caliber machine guns

USS Menoquet (YTM-256) was laid down as YT‑256 by Anderson and Cristofani, San Francisco, California 11 September 1943; named Menoquet 5 January 1944; launched 5 February 1944, sponsored by Mrs. Alfred Cristofani; reclassified YTB‑256 on 15 May 1944; and completed and placed in service at Mare Island, California., 7 June 1944. Harbor tugs (YT) were named after American Indian tribes.

== Service life ==
Joining the Service Squadron of the South Pacific Force, Menoquet had tug and harbor duty at the various bases from which America's victory over Japan was staged, supporting combatants and logistics ships. On 1 May 1945 she was transferred to the 7th Fleet, and during the closing months of fighting in the Pacific she continued to serve at advanced bases in the western Pacific.

Following the Japanese surrender, Menoquet returned to Pearl Harbor, and was ordered disposed of in March 1946. However, in August 1946 she was assigned to duty in the 14th Naval District. For more than a decade she provided services out of Pearl Harbor among the Hawaiian Islands. She continued her vital services to the fleet until her name was stricken from the Navy list 1 May 1959.
