= USLHT Cedar =

United States lighthouse tender

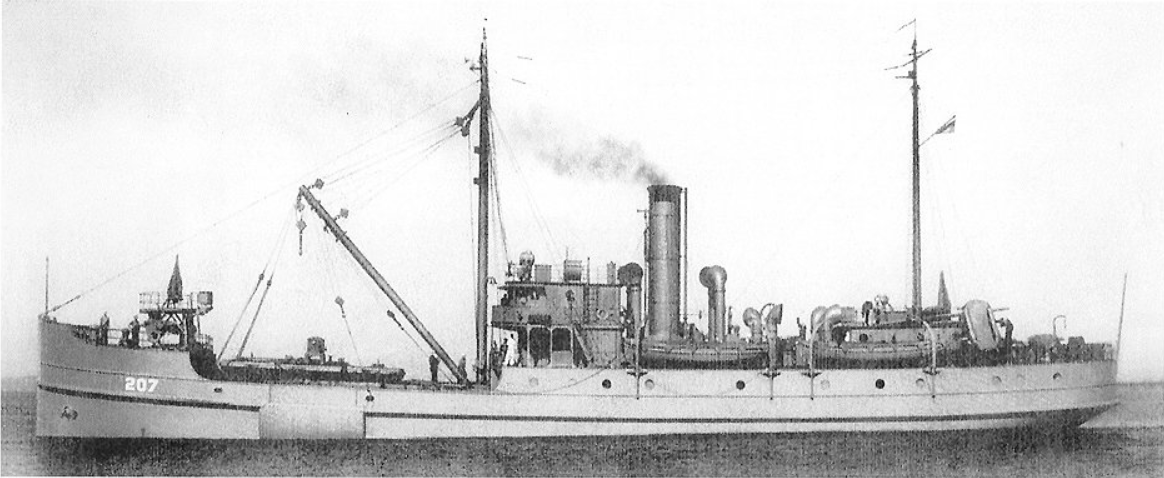
- USCGC Cedar (WAGL-207) at Seattle, Washington on 13 May 1944.

History

United States Lighthouse Service
- Name: USLHT Cedar
- Builder: Craig Shipbuilding Company
- Launched: 27 December 1916
- Identification: Call sign NLW, 1917; WWDO, 1920; Signal letters GVLM
- Fate: Transferred to U.S. Navy August 1917
- Acquired: 1 July 1919 from U.S. Navy
- Fate: Transferred to U.S. Coast Guard 1 July 1939

United States Navy
- Name: USS Cedar
- Acquired: August 1917 from U.S. Lighthouse Service
- Fate: Transferred to U.S. Lighthouse Service 1 July 1919

United States Coast Guard
- Name: USCGC Cedar (WAGL-207)
- Acquired: 1 July 1939 from U.S. Lighthouse Service
- Decommissioned: 6 July 1950
- Identification: Call Sign NRYC
- Fate: Sold to Zidell Explorations, 1955

General characteristics
- Type: Lighthouse tender
- Displacement: 1,890 long tons (1,920 t)
- Length: 200 ft 8 in (61.2 m) overall
- Beam: 36 ft 6 in (11.1 m)
- Draft: 13 ft 6 in (4.11 m)
- Propulsion: One triple-expansion steam engine of 1,455 hp
- Speed: 12 knots maximum; 8 knots economical
- Complement: 29, 1917; 80, 1945

USLHT Cedar was a lighthouse tender launched in 1916 for the United States Lighthouse Service, specifically for the challenging waters of Alaska. She was the largest tender ever built for the service. Her missions included building and maintaining aids to navigation, supplying remote light stations, and assisting vessels in distress. During her career she rescued hundreds of passengers and crew from shipwrecks.

She was in commissioned service in the United States Navy as USS Cedar during World War I, but as there was no fighting in Alaska, her service continued little changed. She also saw service in World War II under U.S. Navy control as part of the United States Coast Guard. During this conflict Cedar was actively engaged in supporting fleet operations, notably in the Aleutians.

Cedar was decommissioned by the Coast Guard in 1950 and sold to private interests in 1955. She remained idle until she was scrapped in 1960.

== Construction and characteristics ==
On 20 May 1912, USLHT Armeria was wrecked while delivering coal to Cape Hinchinbrook Light at the entrance to Prince William Sound. The loss of Armeria was a blow to the Lighthouse Service and hampered its operations in Alaska. Construction of lights at Cape Spencer and Cape St. Elias were delayed when materials carried by the ship were lost. The Lighthouse Service's first budget request to Congress for fiscal year 1914 was $250,000 to replace Armeria with a tender specifically designed to withstand the rigors of Alaskan waters. Congress appropriated the requested $250,000 on 25 January 1915.

The Lighthouse Service advertised for sealed bids to build Cedar in March 1915. Bids were opened on 27 April 1915. Nine bids were received, of which Craig Shipbuilding Company of Long Beach, California was the lowest. On 7 May 1915 Secretary of Commerce William C. Redfield awarded the contract to Craig Shipbuilding Company for $234,500. Subsequent to the contract award, on 1 January 1916, Craig Shipbuilding was sold to the California Shipbuilding Company, which ultimately completed and launched the ship.

Cedar's hull and deckhouses were built of steel plates riveted together. She was 200 feet 8 inches (61.16 m) long overall, and 188 feet (57 m) Long between perpendiculars. She had a beam of 36 feet 6 inches (11.13 m), and a depth of hold of 18 feet (5.5 m). The ship's fully-loaded draft was 13.5 feet (4.1 m). Her light displacement was 1,245 tons, and her mean displacement was 1,890 tons. Her hull was built with seven water-tight bulkheads and a double bottom, to protect her from the type of accident which wrecked Armeria. She was the largest tender ever built for the Lighthouse Service. She was designed under the supervision of Edward C. Gillette, Superintendent of naval construction for the Lighthouse Service.

Cedar was propelled by a single triple-expansion steam engine which weighed approximately 120 tons. The high, intermediate, and low-pressure cylinders of the engine had diameters of 20, 32.5, and 55 inches with a common stroke of 39 inches. The engine was built in the machine shop of the California Shipbuilding Company. It produced 1,455 indicated horsepower. The engine drove a single 4-bladed steel propeller 11.5 feet (3.5 m) in diameter. Steam for the engine was provided by two oil-fired Scotch boilers built by Willamette Iron and Steel Works. Her unrefueled range was about 3,800 miles. This propulsion system gave her a maximum speed of 12 knots, and an economic cruising speed of 8 knots.

As was the custom at the time, lighthouse tenders were named for trees and flowers. Cedar's namesake was the cedar tree, a common name that referred to a number of evergreen trees in multiple taxonomic families.

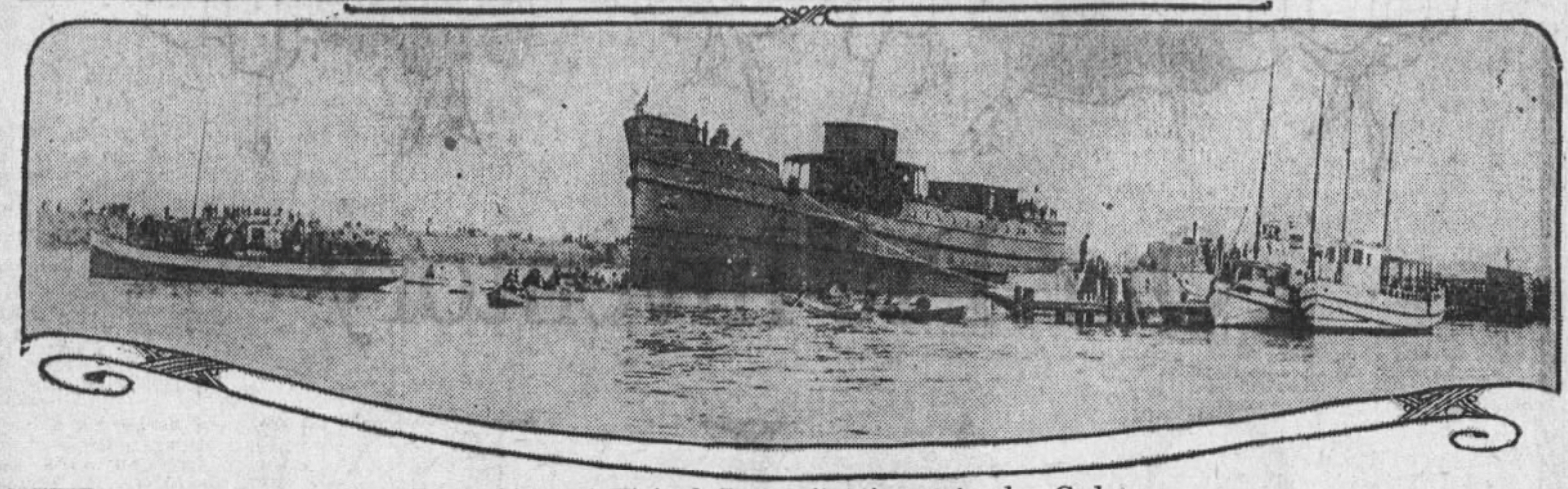
Cedar on her launch day in December 1916

Cedar was equipped with a steam-powered generator, electric lights, and radio telegraph equipment from the start. She was assigned the call sign NLW. On her foredeck she had a steel mast, with a reinforced wooden boom which was used as a derrick to load and unload the ship, and lift buoys for maintenance. Her derrick and anchor windlass were operated by steam-powered winches. There were four cargo holds in Cedar with a total capacity of 39,898 cubic feet. While she was not initially armed, Cedar was built with foundations for four six-pounder guns.

The ship's original cost was $248,180. Her original complement was 7 officers and 22 men.

Over her career, numerous changes were made to the ship. In 1924 radiotelephone equipment was installed to supplement her radiotelegraph gear. In 1933 a Sperry gyrocompass was installed because of the anomalies in magnetic compass performance at the high latitudes Cedar reached in Alaska.

Cedar was launched on 27 December 1916. She was christened by Mrs. Florence Bradford Cook, wife of George C. Cook, the superintendent of construction for the Lighthouse Service who oversaw Cedar's construction. The ship's sea trials were concluded successfully on 12 and 13 June 1917. She was accepted by the Lighthouse Service and placed in commission on 30 June 1917. She sailed from Long Beach to begin her career on 11 July 1917, and arrived at her homeport of Ketchikan on 18 August 1917.

== Service history ==
=== US Navy (1917–1919) ===
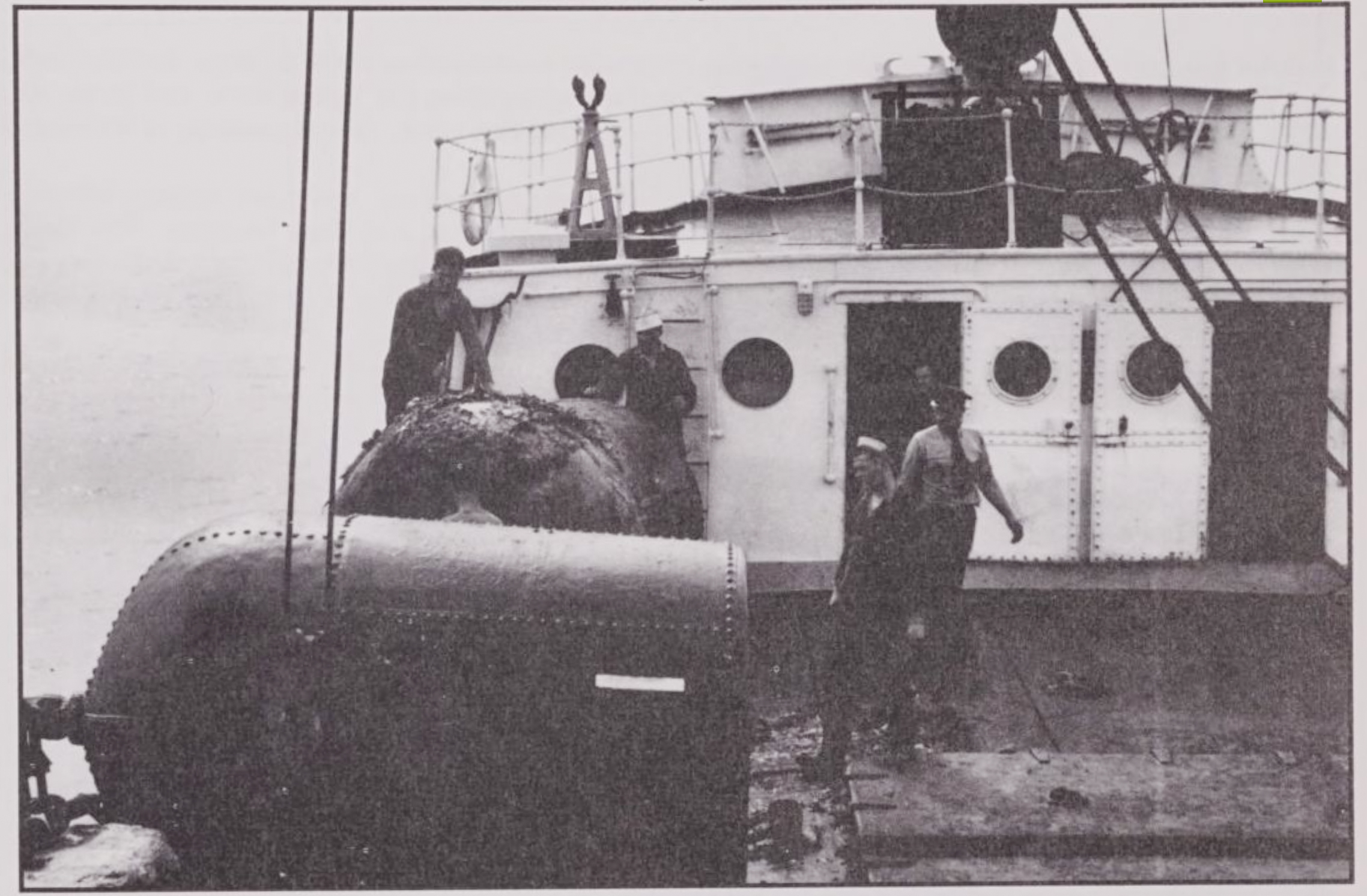
A can buoy on Cedar's foredeck

Shortly after Cedar's completion in August 1917, the Lighthouse Service transferred her to the United States Navy for World War I service. She was commissioned as USS Cedar, and operated as a patrol vessel in the Thirteenth Naval District. There was no fighting in Alaskan waters during the war, so the bulk of her activities were those of any lighthouse tender: placing and maintaining aids to navigation, supplying light stations, assisting vessels in distress, and other missions as assigned.

Cedar completed three special missions in 1918. In April and May 1918, Cedar carried Secretary of Commerce Redfield and the joint American-Canadian Fisheries Conference from San Francisco for hearings in multiple cities in British Columbia and Alaska. Cedar assisted the Bureau of Fisheries, a unit of the Commerce Department, to establish a new plant to process seal carcasses into fertilizer and oil on St. Paul Island in the Pribilofs. She embarked heavy machinery and sailed from Seattle on 12 June 1918 arriving at St. Paul on 11 August 1918. In December 1918, Cedar carried Dr. Emil Krulish, head of the Red Cross expedition for the relief of the influenza epidemic, to a number of cities in Southeast Alaska to investigate conditions and to dispatch other medical personnel.

Shortly after the conclusion of hostilities in World War I, on 1 July 1919, the elements of the Lighthouse Service which had been transferred to the Navy, including Cedar, were returned to Commerce Department control.

==== Princess Sophia loss (October 1918) ====
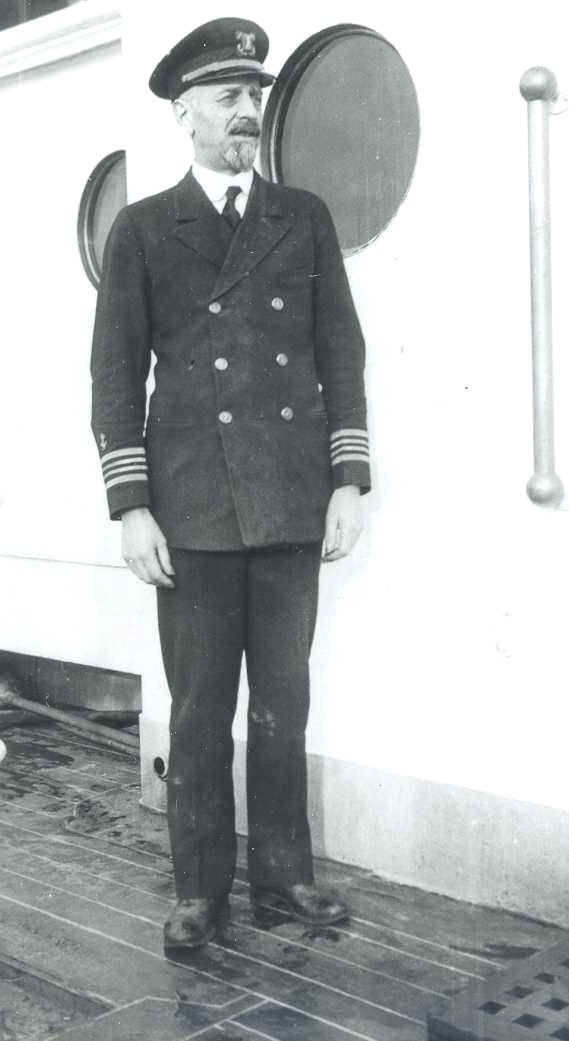
Captain John W. Leadbetter was Cedar's first commanding officer in 1917 and served aboard her until his retirement in 1940.

At 14:00 on 24 October 1918, Cedar received word that the Canadian passenger steamer SS Princess Sophia had run aground in a snowstorm eleven hours earlier on Vanderbilt Reef in Lynn Canal in Southeast Alaska during a voyage from Skagway to Juneau. The largest all-weather ship in the vicinity and the only one large enough to take off all of Princess Sophia′s passengers and crew, Cedar was 66 nautical miles (122 km; 76 mi) away. She established wireless contact with Princess Sophia and proceeded immediately to the scene, arriving there at 20:00 and found that the fishing schooner King & Winge, two other large vessels, and 15 smaller fishing vessels also were there. Cedar was the only vessel on the scene equipped with wireless, so her captain, John W. Leadbetter, began to organize a rescue attempt. Training Cedar′s searchlights on Princess Sophia, Ledbetter could see that waves were breaking against her hull, making it too dangerous for Princess Sophia to launch her lifeboats. Princess Sophia and the rescue ships agreed to await high tide at 05:00 on 25 October to attempt to launch the boats, then cancelled that plan out of concern for the safety of the boats. Cedar anchored in the lee of a nearby island for the night.

By 0900 on 25 October 1918, a gale was blowing and Leadbetter, who had brought Cedar back to the scene of Princess Sophia′s grounding, was having trouble keeping Cedar on station. He decided to try to anchor Cedar 500 yards (460 m) downwind of Vanderbilt Reef, fire a line to Princess Sophia, and then evacuate all on board by breeches buoy, but anchoring proved impossible. As conditions worsened, Cedar and King & Winge took shelter behind Sentinel Island, and Captain Miller of King & Winge came aboard Cedar to discuss further rescue options. They decided that if the weather moderated enough, they would attempt to anchor King & Winge near Vanderbilt Reef while Cedar anchored to windward of King and Winge to create a lee. Cedar would then launch her boats, which would ferry Princess Sophia′s passengers and crew to King and Winge. Leadbetter and Miller agreed that it would be best to wait until 26 October to attempt the rescue, as Princess Sophia appeared to be withstanding the pounding she was taking on the reef and it was possible the weather would improve enough to make a rescue less risky.

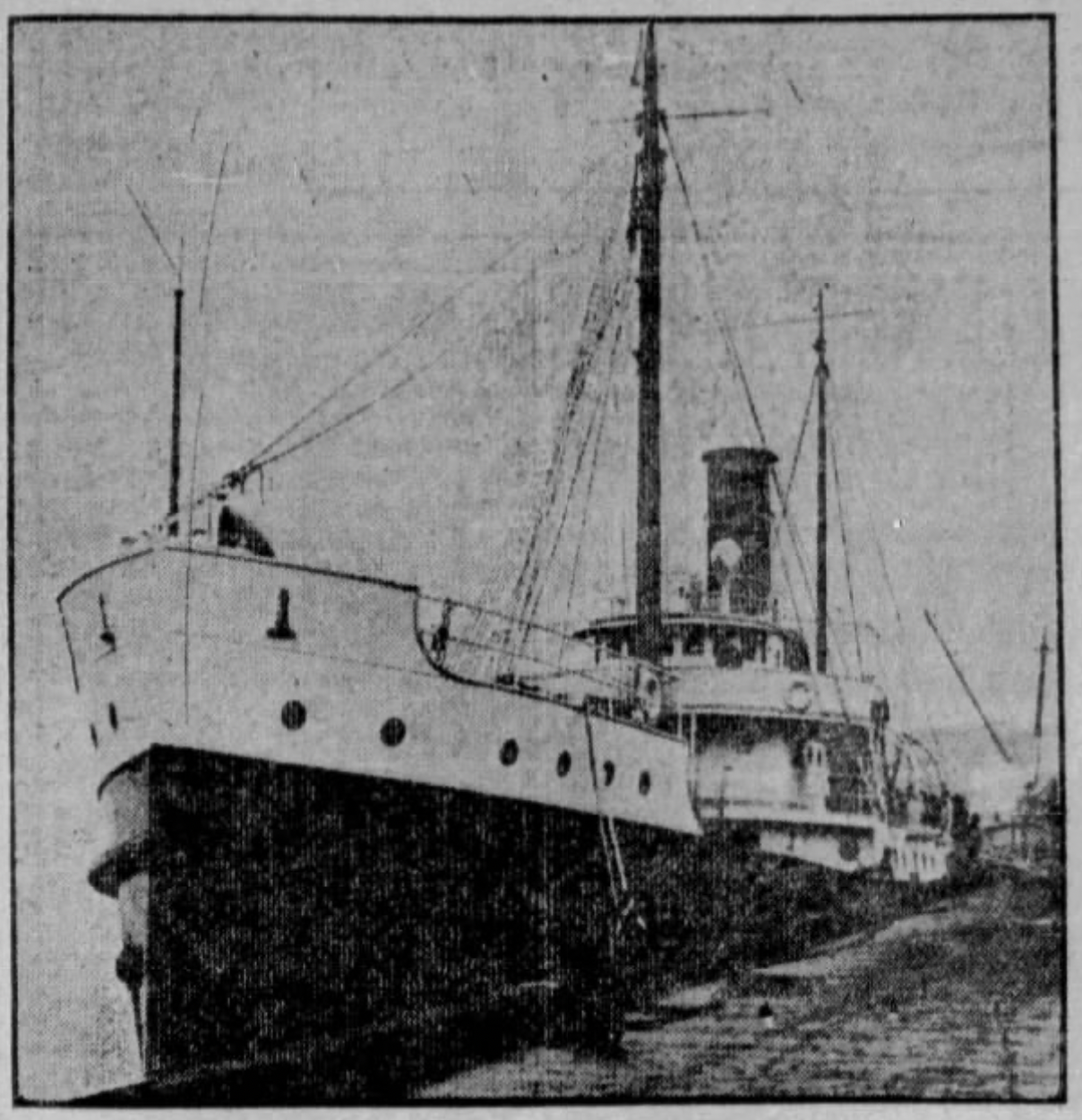
Cedar in January 1919

At 16:50 on 25 October, just as Miller was departing Cedar, Princess Sophia sent a distress signal saying that she was sinking. Cedar got underway from Sentinel Island in an attempt to reach her, but conditions were so extreme that she was herself in danger, and after 30 minutes she had to turn back. Sometime around 17:50, Princess Sophia slipped off the reef and sank with the loss of all 343 people aboard, the worst maritime disaster in the history of Alaska and British Columbia. On 26 October 1918, Cedar, King & Winge, and other vessels reached the scene of the sinking, and found only Princess Sophia's mast protruding above water. They recovered bodies, but found no survivors. Cedar and King & Winge proceeded to Juneau, where Leadbetter sent out a wire which reported "No sign of life. No hope of survivors."

Captain Leadbetter and Cedar's radio operator, who was in contact with Princess Sophia, both testified regarding their actions at hearings on the disaster in Victoria, B.C. in January 1919. Leadbetter testified again at hearings in Seattle in February 1921.

=== US Lighthouse Service (1919–1939) ===
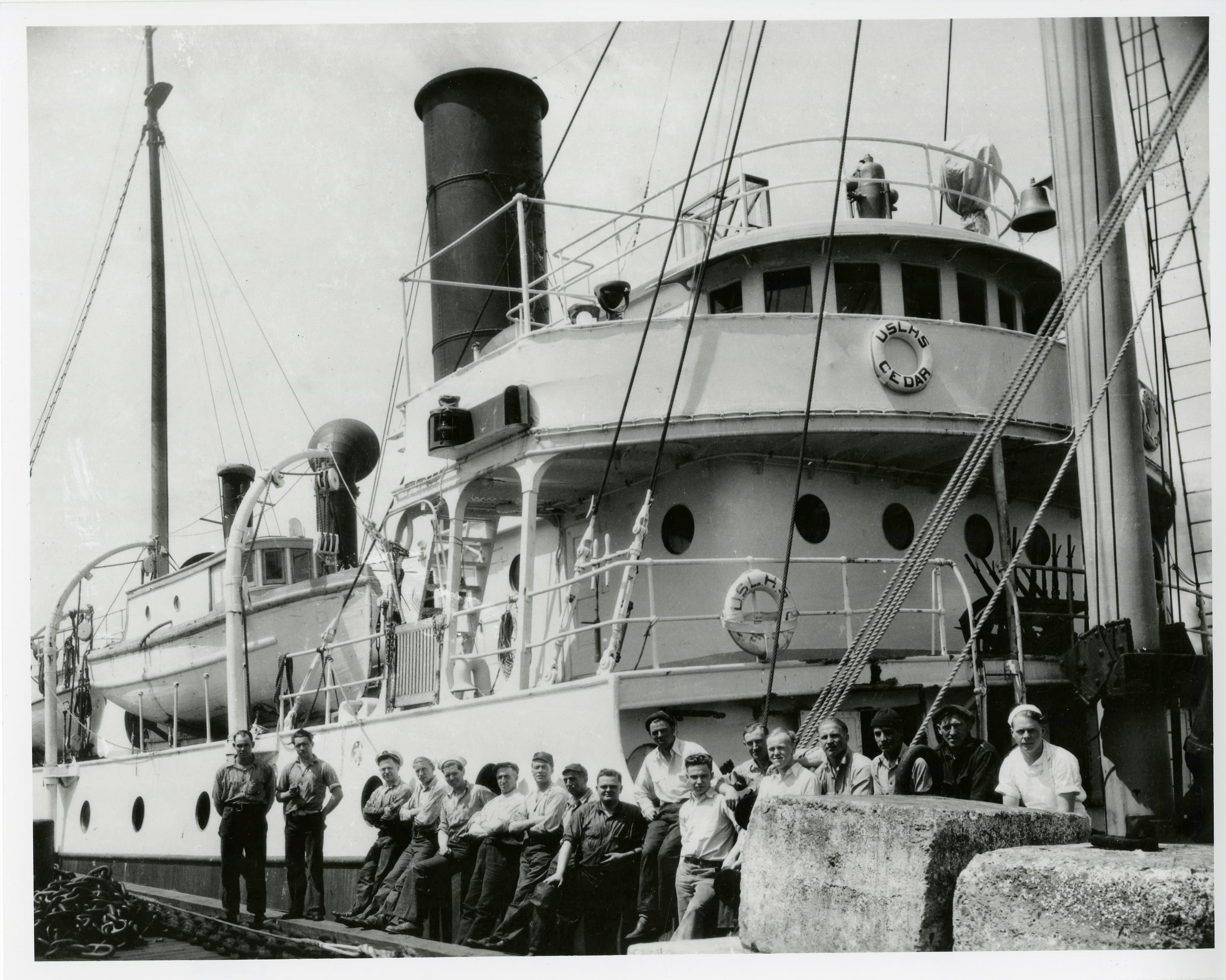
Cedar's Lighthouse Service crew

As Cedar's military duties had been small, the end of her Navy service in 1919 had little impact on her activities. From her homeport in Ketchikan she continued to place and maintain aids to navigation, supply remote light stations, and aid vessels in distress.

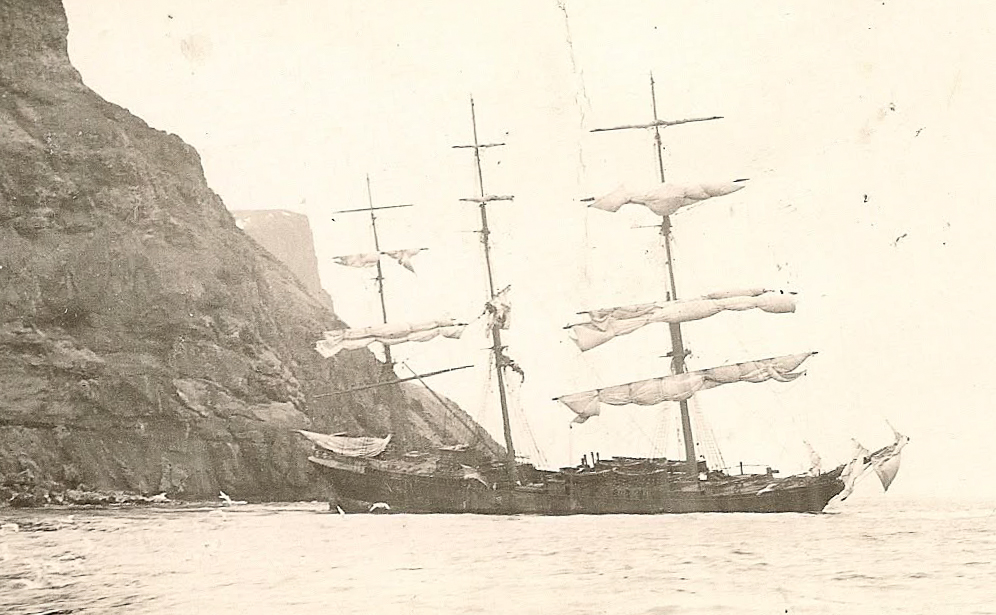
Cedar rescued 263 people aboard the wrecked Star of Falkland in May 1928

On 25 April 1928 the Alaska Packers Association sailing ship Star of Falklands sailed from San Francisco for the company's salmon cannery at Naknek on Bristol Bay. She had aboard 280 cannery workers, 40 ship's crew, and cannery supplies for the new season. She passed through Unimak Pass and went aground shortly after midnight on 23 May 1928. Cedar was only sixty miles away when she received a distress message from Star of Falkland, and went to assist. On the scene she launched her boats and launch and rescued 263 of the people aboard. USCGC Unalaga, USCGC Haida, and the cannery tender Arctic rescued the remainder of the passengers and crew. The survivors were carried on to Naknek on Arctic.

On 10 February 1938, Cedar hit a rock while servicing Sentinel Island Light and damaged her rudder and propeller. She was towed in to Tee Harbor by the U.S. Army tender Fornance, and then on to Ketchikan for repairs.

On 1 July 1939, the U.S. Lighthouse Service was abolished and the United States Coast Guard took over its responsibilities and assets, including Cedar. The tender became USCGC Cedar. While little changed in her aids to navigation assignment in Alaska, her crew underwent a transition from civilian to military service.

=== US Coast Guard (1939–1950) ===
==== World War II ====
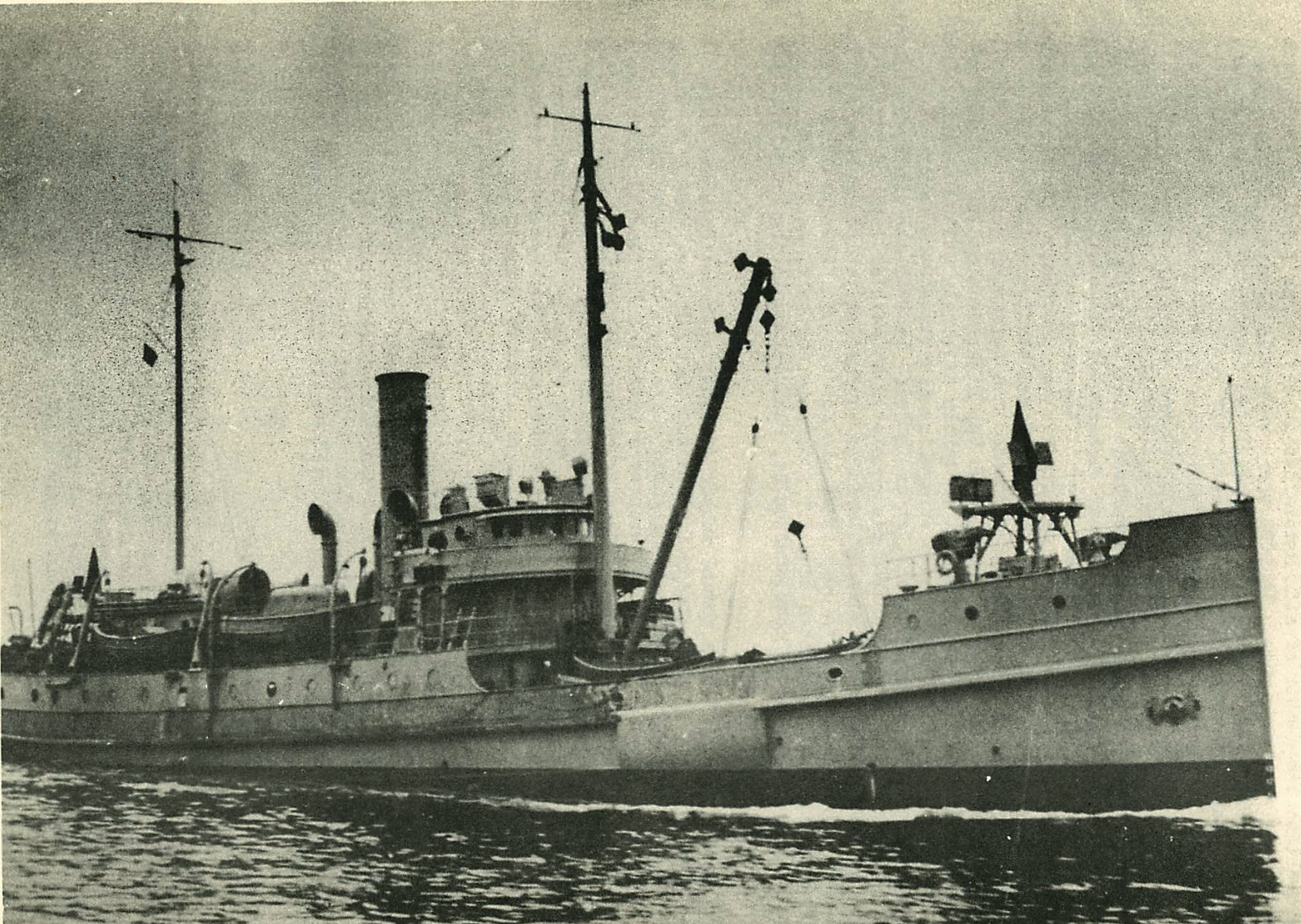
Cedar during World War II

On 1 November 1941 President Roosevelt signed Executive Order 8929 transferring the Coast Guard from Treasury Department control to Navy Department control.

Cedar was armed for her World War II service. By 1943 she had a single depth charge rack. By 1945 this had been upgraded to two depth charge racks and two 20mm/80 guns, one prominent on a platform on the forecastle. Her wartime complement was large, growing to 4 officers, 1 warrant officer, and 75 men by 1945.

Cedar spent World War II in Alaskan waters, much of it in the Kodiak and Unalaska sectors of the 17th Naval District. In addition to aids to navigation work, she was given a variety of missions. She placed moorings for battleships and other naval vessels. She escorted other vessels and patrolled threatened areas. In the fall of 1943 Cedar supported the construction of a chain of LORAN stations in the Aleutians, transporting materials and equipment from Dutch Harbor to the transmitter sites. She delivered personnel, equipment, and supplies throughout the Aleutians and Pribilofs.

In 1943, Cedar played a small part in the Battle of Attu. She departed Adak on 26 May 1943 in a convoy escorted by USS Perry and USS Elliot, bound for Attu, where she arrived on 28 May 1943. On 3 June 1943, the ship left Massacre Bay in a convoy escorted by USS Meade and USS Chandler, bound for Amchitka where she arrived the next day. Her task there was to replace the anti-submarine net at Constantine Harbor.

On 11 October 1944, Cedar assisted in refloating USSR Kolosnik which had gone aground near Akutan. In March 1945, Cedar was one of several vessels dispatched to render assistance to Navy repair ship YR-43 which had gone aground near Montague Island at the entrance to Prince William Sound.

In October 1945 Cedar was transferred from the Kodiak and Unalaska sector back to the District Coast Guard Officer at Ketchikan. In November 1945 the Navy decided to reduce her armament to peacetime levels. On 28 December 1945 President Truman issued Executive Order 9666 canceling Executive Order 8929 and returning the Coast Guard, including Cedar, to Treasury Department control.

==== Post war ====
After the war, Cedar returned to her working maintaining aids to navigation, now based at Kodiak.

During this period she was often engaged in assisting ships in distress. The Alaska Steamship Company passenger liner Yukon went aground near Seward on 4 February 1946 with 496 passengers and crew aboard. Cedar was one of the ships sent to the wreck, and succeeded in rescuing 116 survivors. The crew gave their spare clothing to the soaked passengers, with several of the women clad in the cutter's baseball team uniforms. A year later, another Alaska Steamship Company ship, Alaska, tore holes in her hull near Cordova. She reached port, but her flooding threatened the 199 people aboard. Cedar was one of the ships dispatched to assist her. On 13 January 1948, Cedar rescued 15 passengers and crew from the sinking steamer Aleutian Mail near Unimak Island.

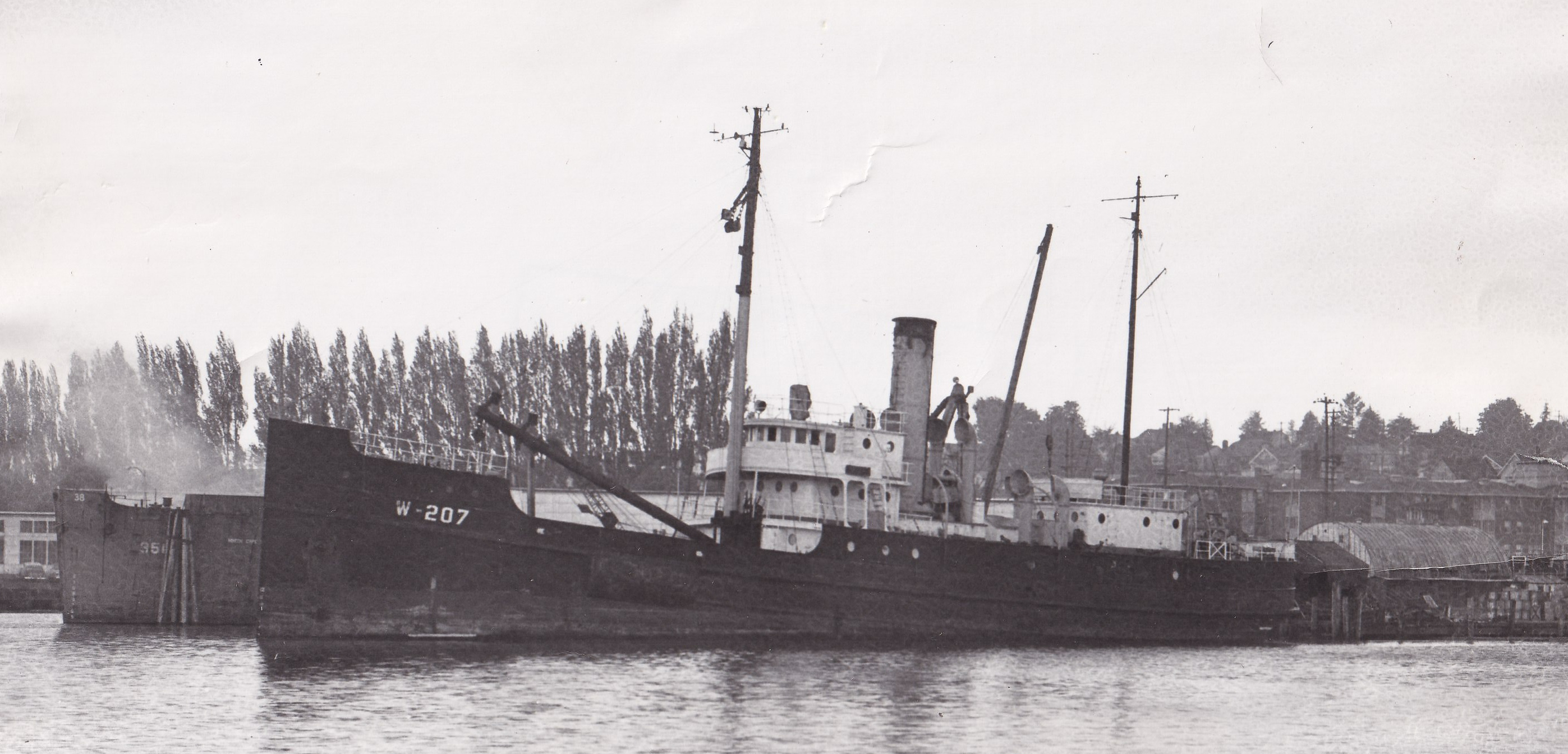
Cedar in 1955, shortly before her sale by the Coast Guard

==== Disposal ====
The Coast Guard decommissioned Cedar on 6 July 1950 at its base on the Lake Washington Ship Canal in Seattle. At the time she was still the largest tender in the service. Her crew was transferred to USCGC Sedge, which replaced Cedar at Kodiak. On 6 June 1955 the Coast Guard opened sealed bids to sell Cedar. The high bid came from Zidell Explorations, Inc. of Portland, Oregon, which purchased the ship.

== Commercial ownership (1955–1960) ==
Zidell moved Cedar from Seattle to its shipyard in Portland. In 1958 she was purchased by a group of Portland businessmen to be the first ship of the newly formed Oregon-Alaska Steamship Company. They planned to rename her Cheechako, and begin freight service between Portland and ports in Alaska. The ship was moved to the Willamette Tug and Barge Company dock to begin the conversion to a freighter and was hauled out at a Swan Island drydock for work on her hull. By the end of 1960, however, Oregon-Alaska Steamship Company had failed and Zidell took back the ship. Zidell scrapped the vessel shortly thereafter at its Portland facility.
