= USS Charleston (PG-51) =

Gunboat of the United States Navy

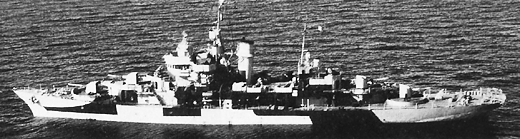
- USS Charleston

History

United States
- Name: USS Charleston
- Namesake: Charleston, South Carolina
- Builder: Charleston Naval Yard, Charleston, SC
- Laid down: 27 October 1934
- Launched: 25 February 1936
- Commissioned: 8 July 1936
- Decommissioned: 10 May 1946
- Identification: Hull symbol:PG-51
- Commissioned: 25 March 1948 Transferred to the Massachusetts Maritime Academy
- Decommissioned: 1957 Last cruise for the Maritime Academy
- Honors and awards: 1 Battle Stars; American Defense Service Medal; American Campaign Medal; Asiatic-Pacific Campaign Medal; World War II Victory Medal; Navy Occupation Medal with "ASIA" clasp; China Service Medal
- Fate: Sold to an Italian investor and planned to be converted into a floating night club/hotel

General characteristics
- Class & type: Erie-class gunboat
- Displacement: 2,000 long tons (2,000 t) (standard); 2,715 long tons (2,759 t) (full load)
- Length: 328 ft 6 in (100.13 m) o/a; 308 ft (94 m) p.p.
- Beam: 41 ft 3 in (12.57 m)
- Draft: 14 ft 10 in (4.52 m) (full load)
- Installed power: 6,200 shp (4,600 kW)
- Propulsion: 2 × geared steam turbines; 2 × shafts
- Speed: 19.6 kn (22.6 mph; 36.3 km/h)
- Range: 12,000 nmi (14,000 mi; 22,000 km) at 12 kn (14 mph; 22 km/h)
- Complement: 236
- Armament: 4 × 6-inch (152 mm)/47 caliber Mark 17 guns; 4 × 1.1 in (28 mm)/75 cal Quadruple anti-aircraft guns (4x4)
- Aircraft carried: 1 × floatplane "Kingfisher"

USS Charleston (PG-51), the fourth vessel to carry her name, was the second of two Erie-class patrol gunboats. Launched from the Charleston Navy Yard on 25 February 1936, and commissioned on 8 July 1936 and was part of the Atlantic Fleet.

== Inter-war period ==
Charleston sailed from Norfolk, Virginia on 24 February 1937 to join Squadron 40T, in which she visited Dubrovnik, Yugoslavia, Trieste, Naples, Italy, and Algiers before returning to the Charleston Navy Yard for updating on 24 April. On 9 July, she sailed to Balboa, Panama for extensive training and combat exercises in the Panama area before returning north back to Charleston on 1 March 1938.

From 21 April-3 October 1938, and from 4 January 1939 – 27 June 1940, she returned to the Caribbean to conduct off-shore patrols and good will visits, and on the second trip she served as flagship. In September 1940, she cleared Norfolk, Virginia and headed for Seattle, Washington. From there, she headed to Alaska to the 13th Naval District. From 6 November 1940 – 27 November 1941, she made five cruises from Seattle to the Aleutians.

== World War II ==
Upon the entry of the United States into World War II, Charleston intensified the schedule of patrol and convoy escort duties necessary to protect this far-northern region, and except for four voyages to west coast ports for maintenance, she operated from Dutch Harbor or Kodiak, Alaska throughout the war. Along with her escort and patrol duties, she carried out such missions as landing reconnaissance parties, aiding stricken ships, and taking part in the operations at Attu Island, which was assaulted on 11 May 1943. Two days later, Charleston arrived to bring her firepower to support Army troops ashore, bombarding Chichagof Harbor, Alaska, and screening the transports lying off the island. During the attack of Japanese bombers on 22 May, she evaded aerial torpedoes by radical maneuvering, while splashing one enemy plane and helping to drive off the others. She provided call fire until the island was secured, and supported its occupation through convoy escort runs between Attu and Adak Islands.

Charleston was anchored nearby a US Army barge at Tanaga Bay, Andreanof Islands, Aleutian Islands, US Territory of Alaska, when on the evening of 16 August 1944 her crew observed the crash of a US Army Air Force North American B-25D Mitchell bomber (serial number 41-29753) aircraft into the bay, about four miles west from the ship. A rescue party was immediately dispatched from the Charleston, a boat from the Army barge arriving first, but they were unable to find any of the B-25's crew members. All nine personnel aboard the aircraft were lost in the incident, and their remains have not been recovered.

At the close of the war, Charleston prepared for Far Eastern duty, and on 25 November 1945 arrived at Hong Kong. She also visited Shanghai before returning to San Francisco, California on 4 March 1946. Here she was decommissioned on 10 May and transferred to the Massachusetts Maritime Academy on 25 March 1948.

Charleston served as the training ship for the Massachusetts Maritime Academy from 1948 to 1959. In 1959, she was returned to the US Maritime Administration for final disposition.

== Awards ==
- American Defense Service Medal with "FLEET" clasp
- Asiatic-Pacific Campaign Medal with one battle star
- World War II Victory Medal
- Navy Occupation Medal with "ASIA" clasp
- China Service Medal
