= List of mine warfare vessels of the United States Navy =

Ships of the United States Navy

Ships in current service
- Current ships

Ships grouped alphabetically
- A–B; C; D–F; G–H; I–K; L; M; N–O; P; Q–R; S; T–V; W–Z

Ships grouped by type
- Aircraft carriers; Airships; Amphibious warfare ships; Auxiliaries; Battlecruisers; Battleships; Cruisers; Destroyers; Destroyer escorts; Destroyer leaders; Escort carriers; Frigates; Hospital ships; Littoral combat ships; Mine warfare vessels; Monitors; Oilers; Patrol vessels; Registered civilian vessels; Sailing frigates; Steam frigates; Steam gunboats; Ships of the line; Sloops of war; Submarines; Torpedo boats; Torpedo retrievers; Unclassified miscellaneous; Yard and district craft

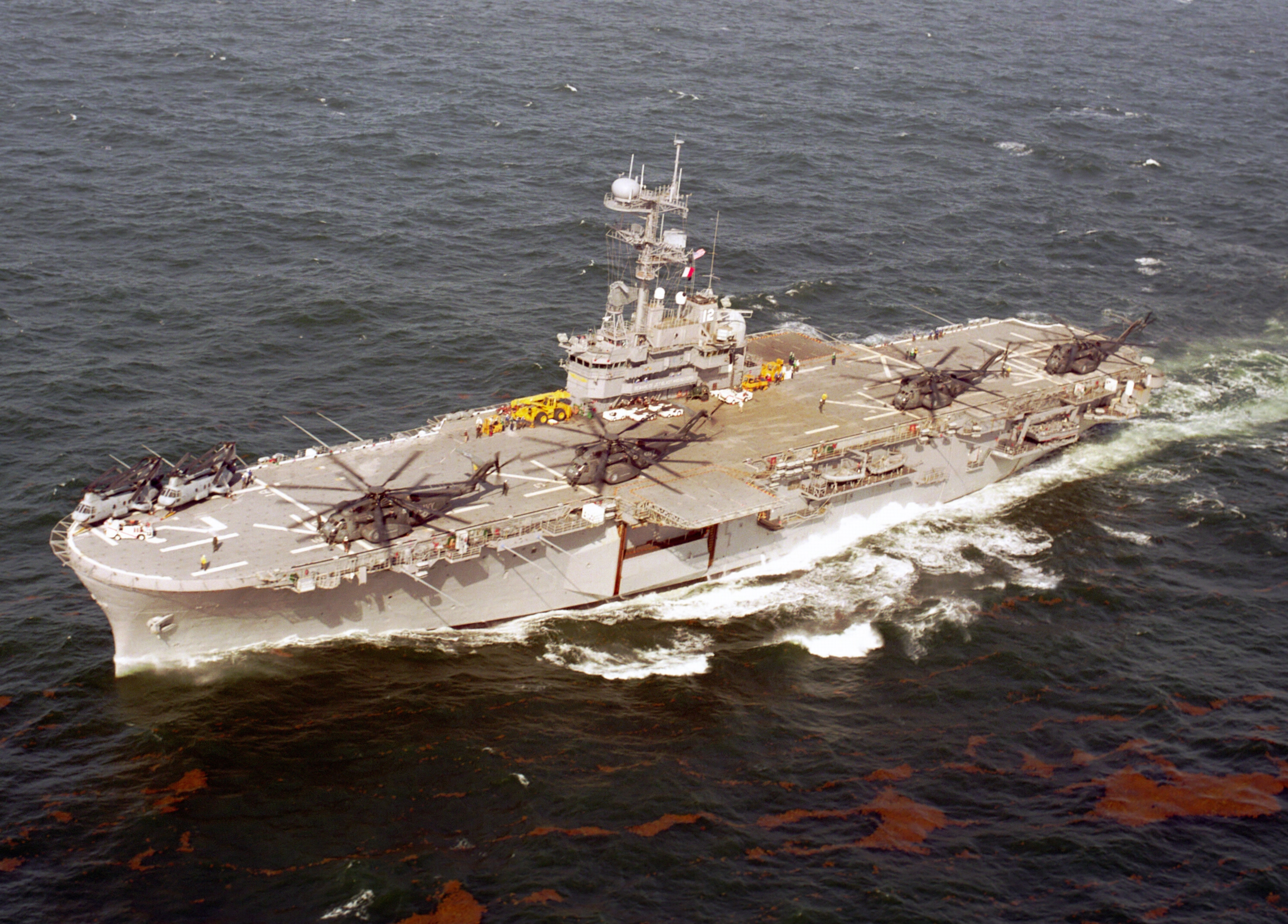
USS Inchon (MCS-12) with four MH-53E minesweeping helicopters on deck, 2001

This is a list of mine warfare vessels of the United States Navy.

Ship status is indicated as either currently active [A] (including ready reserve), inactive [I], or precommissioning [P]. Ships in the inactive category include only ships in the inactive reserve, ships which have been disposed from US service have no listed status. Ships in the precommissioning category include ships under construction or on order.

== Historical overview ==
Mine warfare consists of: minelaying, the deployment of explosive naval mines at sea to sink enemy ships or to prevent their access to particular areas; minesweeping, the removal or detonation of naval mines; and degaussing, the process of decreasing or eliminating a remnant magnetic field in a ship's hull to prevent its detection by magnetic mines. The US Navy has operated ships and craft for all three purposes. Mine planting is the laying and maintenance of controlled mines for harbor defense, which was traditionally a role of the US Army.

=== Classifications ===
Mine warfare ships were originally considered by the US Navy to be either auxiliaries or yard and district craft, and so were given hull classification symbols beginning with either 'A' or 'Y', depending on their capabilities. The exceptions were four converted cargo ships with ID numbers (prior to the modern hull system), certain large 'cruiser' minelayers which were given hull symbols beginning with 'CM', converted destroyers which were given hull symbols beginning with 'DM', and three unclassified civilian cargo ships after World War II.

On 7 February 1955 all of these ships and craft still in service or reserve were reclassed and received new hull symbols beginning with 'M', usually without change of hull number. The exception was the degaussing ships, which retained the 'A' hull symbol.

Modern Littoral Combat Ships use 'L' hull symbols even though they can be used for mine warfare.

== Auxiliary minelayers (ACM) ==
All ACMs except USS Buttress and USS Monadnock were originally US Army mine planters.

Chimo class

- USS Chimo (ACM-1)
- USS Planter (ACM-2)
- USS Barricade (ACM-3)
- USS Barbican (ACM-5)
- USS Bastion (ACM-6)
- USS Obstructor (ACM-7)
- USS Picket (ACM-8)
- USS Trapper (ACM-9), later ARC-5

PCE-842 class

- USS Buttress (ACM-4), ex-PCE-878

Camanche class

- USS Camanche (ACM-11)
- USS Canonicus (ACM-12)
- USS Miantonomah (ACM-13)
- USS Monadnock (ACM-14)
- USS Nausett (ACM-15)
- USS Puritan (ACM-16)

Other classes

- USS Monadnock (ACM-10)

== Degaussing ships (ADG) ==
- USS Lodestone (ADG-8), ex-YDG-8
- USS Magnet (ADG-9), ex-YDG-9
- USS Deperm (ADG-10), ex-YDG-10
- USS Ampere (ADG-11), ex-YDG-11
- USS Surfbird (ADG-383), ex-MSF-383

== Minesweepers (AM) ==
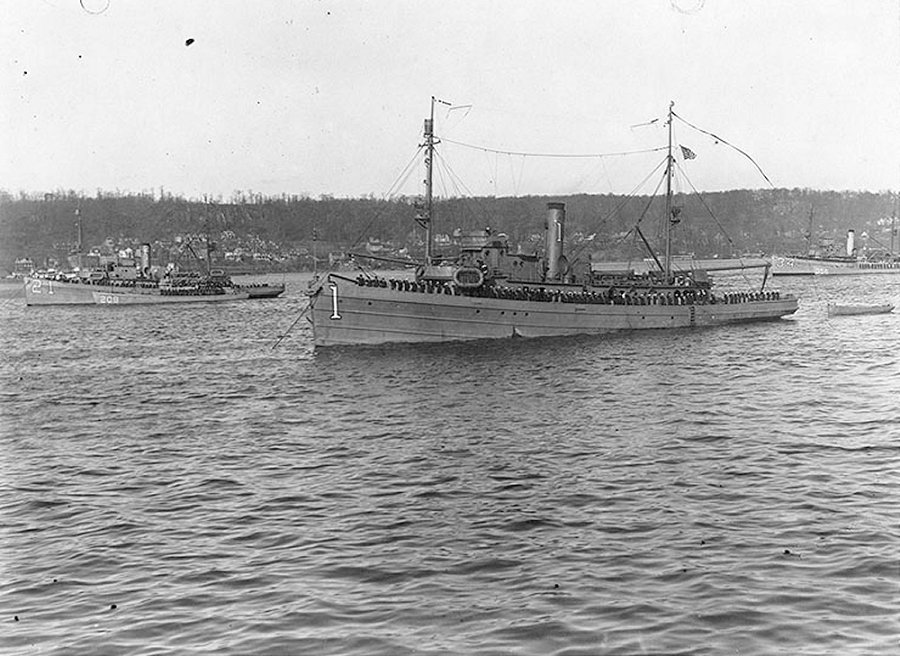
USS Lapwing (AM-1)

Lapwing class

- USS Lapwing (AM-1), later AVP-1
- USS Owl (AM-2), later AT-137, ATO-137
- USS Robin (AM-3), later AT-140, ATO-140
- USS Swallow (AM-4), wrecked Kanaga Island, Alaska 19 February 1938
- USS Tanager (AM-5), sunk by Japanese artillery on Bataan 4 May 1942
- USS Cardinal (AM-6), wrecked off Chirikof Island, Alaska 6 June 1923
- USS Oriole (AM-7), later AT-136, ATO-136
- USS Curlew (AM-8), wrecked Point Mosquito Panama 15 December 1925
- USS Finch (AM-9), sunk in air attack, Corregidor, PI, 10 April 1942
- USS Heron (AM-10), later AVP-2
- USS Condor (AM-11), canceled 4 December 1918
- USS Plover (AM-12), canceled 4 December 1918
- USS Turkey (AM-13), later AT-143, ATO-143
- USS Woodcock (AM-14), later AT-145, ATO-145
- USS Quail (AM-15), scuttled off Corregidor 5 May 1942
- USS Partridge (AM-16), later AT-138, ATO-138
- USS Eider (AM-17), later YNG-20
- USS Thrush (AM-18), later AVP-3
- USS Avocet (AM-19), later AVP-4
- USS Bobolink (AM-20), later AT-131, ATO-131
- USS Lark (AM-21), later AT-168, ATO-168
- USS Widgeon (AM-22), later ASR-1
- USS Teal (AM-23), later AVP-5
- USS Brant (AM-24), later ARS-32
- USS Kingfisher (AM-25), later AT-135, ATO-135
- USS Rail (AM-26), later AT-139, ATO-139
- USS Pelican (AM-27), later AVP-6
- USS Falcon (AM-28), later ASR-2
- USS Osprey (AM-29), later ARS-2
- USS Seagull (AM-30), later AT-141, ATO-141
- USS Tern (AM-31), later AT-142, ATO-142
- USS Flamingo (AM-32), later ARS-1
- USS Penguin (AM-33), scuttled Guam 8 December 1941
- USS Swan (AM-34), later AVP-7
- USS Whippoorwill (AM-35)
- USS Bittern (AM-36), scuttled in Manila Bay, PI following damage from air attack 10 December 1941
- USS Sanderling (AM-37), accidentally sank while under tow Hawaii 26 June 1937
- USS Auk (AM-38), later ARS-3
- USS Chewink (AM-39), later ASR-3
- USS Cormorant (AM-40), later AT-133, ATO-133
- USS Gannet (AM-41), later AVP-8
- USS Goshawk (AM-42), canceled 4 December 1918
- USS Grebe (AM-43), later AT-134
- USS Mallard (AM-44), later ASR-4
- USS Ortolan (AM-45), later ASR-5
- USS Peacock (AM-46), sunk in collision, 24 August 1940
- USS Pigeon (AM-47), later ASR-6
- USS Redwing (AM-48), later ARS-4
- USS Raven (AM-49), canceled 4 December 1918
- USS Shrike (AM-50), canceled 4 December 1918
- USS Sandpiper (AM-51), later AVP-9
- USS Vireo (AM-52), later AT-144
- USS Warbler (AM-53), later ARS-11
- USS Willet (AM-54), later ARS-12

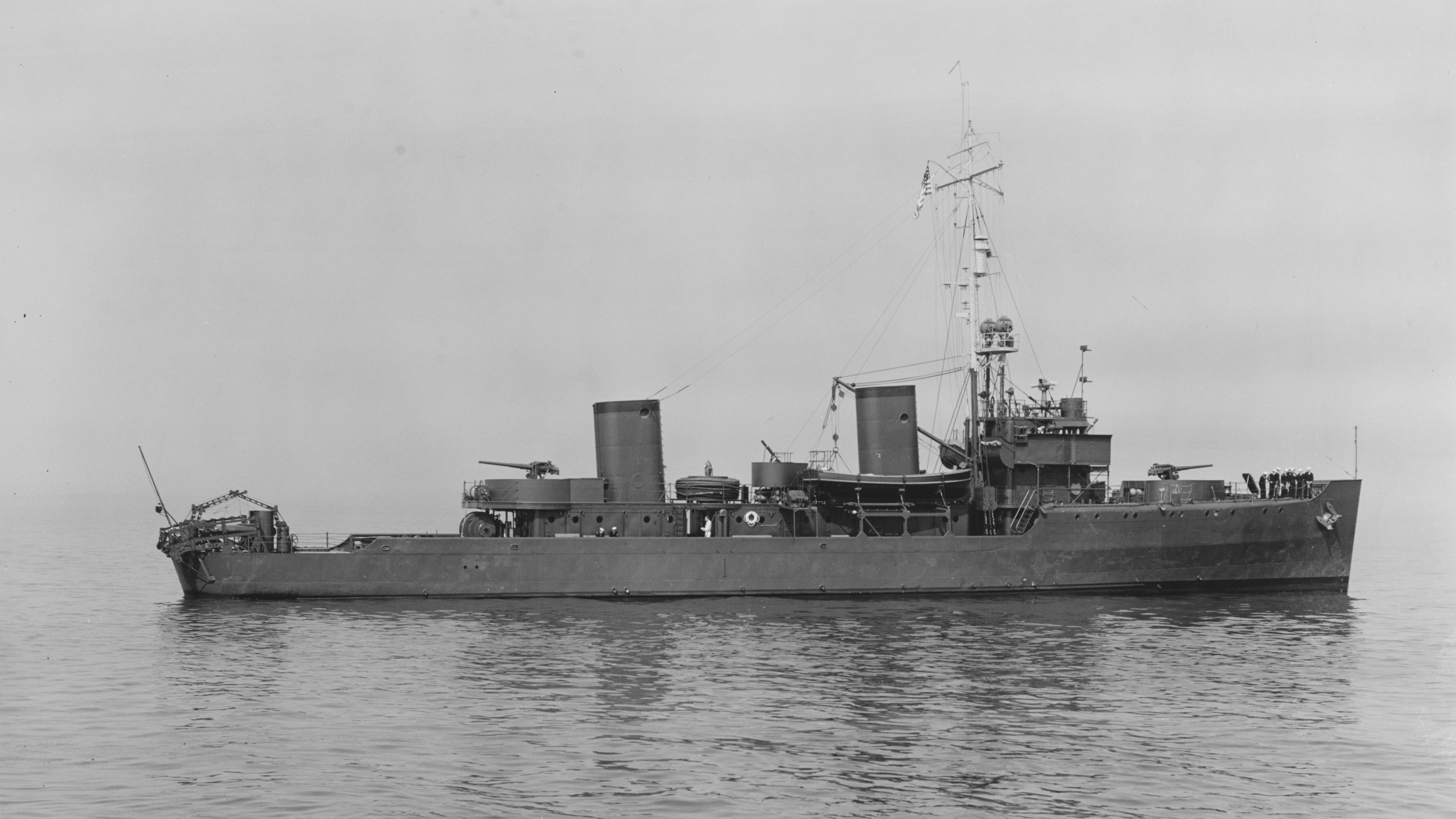
USS Osprey (AM-56)

Raven class

The Raven class became Minesweepers, steel hulled (MSF) on 7 February 1955.

- USS Raven (AM-55)
- USS Osprey (AM-56), sunk by mine, English Channel, 5 June 1944, 6 killed

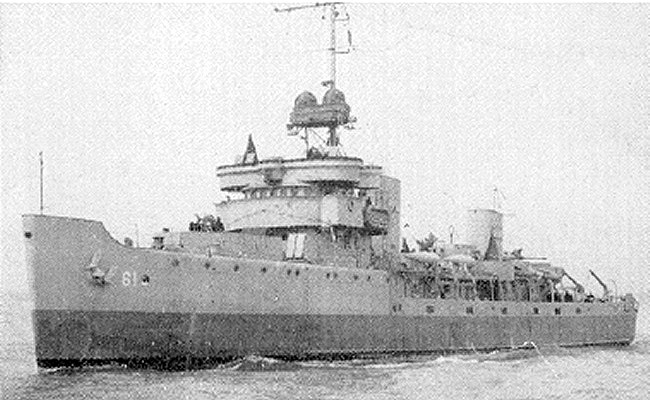
USS Pheasant (AM-61)

Auk class

The Auk class became Minesweepers, Steel Hulled (MSF) on 7 February 1955.

- USS Auk (AM-57)
- USS Broadbill (AM-58)
- USS Chickadee (AM-59)
- USS Nuthatch (AM-60)
- USS Pheasant (AM-61)
- USS Sheldrake (AM-62), later AGS-19
- USS Skylark (AM-63), sunk by mine Okinawa 28 March 1945, 5 killed
- USS Starling (AM-64)
- USS Swallow (AM-65), sunk by kamikaze Okinawa 22 April 1945
- USS Heed (AM-100)
- USS Herald (AM-101)
- USS Motive (AM-102)
- USS Oracle (AM-103)
- USS Pilot (AM-104)
- USS Pioneer (AM-105)
- USS Portent (AM-106)
- USS Prevail (AM-107), later AGS-20
- USS Pursuit (AM-108), later AGS-17
- USS Requisite (AM-109), later AGS-18
- USS Revenge (AM-110)
- USS Sage (AM-111)
- USS Seer (AM-112)
- USS Sentinel (AM-113), sunk in air attack 10 July 1943, several killed
- USS Staff (AM-114)
- USS Skill (AM-115), sunk by torpedo 25 September 1943, 72 killed
- USS Speed (AM-116)
- USS Strive (AM-117)
- USS Steady (AM-118)
- USS Sustain (AM-119)
- USS Sway (AM-120)
- USS Swerve (AM-121), sunk by mine Anzio 9 July 1944
- USS Swift (AM-122)
- USS Symbol (AM-123)
- USS Threat (AM-124)
- USS Tide (AM-125), sunk by mine Normandy 7 June 1944, at least 1 killed
- USS Token (AM-126)
- USS Tumult (AM-127)
- USS Velocity (AM-128)
- USS Vital (AM-129)
- USS Usage (AM-130)
- USS Zeal (AM-131)
- USS Champion (AM-314)
- USS Chief (AM-315)
- USS Competent (AM-316)
- USS Defense (AM-317)
- USS Devastator (AM-318)
- USS Gladiator (AM-319)
- USS Impeccable (AM-320)
- USS Spear (AM-322)
- USS Triumph (AM-323)
- USS Vigilance (AM-324)
- USS Ardent (AM-340)
- USS Dextrous (AM-341)
- USS Minivet (AM-371)
- USS Murrelet (AM-372)
- USS Peregrine (AM-373)
- USS Pigeon (AM-374)
- USS Pochard (AM-375)
- USS Ptarmigan (AM-376)
- USS Quail (AM-377)
- USS Redstart (AM-378)
- USS Roselle (AM-379)
- USS Ruddy (AM-380)
- USS Scoter (AM-381)
- USS Shoveler (AM-382)
- USS Surfbird (AM-383)
- USS Sprig (AM-384)
- USS Tanager (AM-385)
- USS Tercel (AM-386)
- USS Toucan (AM-387)
- USS Towhee (AM-388)
- USS Waxwing (AM-389)
- USS Wheatear (AM-390)

Bullfinch class

- USS Bullfinch (AM-66)
- USS Cardinal (AM-67)

Catbird class

- USS Catbird (AM-68), later IX-183
- USS Curlew (AM-69), later IX-170

Albatross class (1940)

- USS Albatross (AM-71), later IX-171
- USS Bluebird (AM-72), later IX-172

Kite class

- USS Kite (AM-75)
- USS Linnet (AM-76), later IX-166

Goshawk class

- USS Goshawk (AM-79), ex-AMc-4, later IX-195

Goldcrest class

- USS Goldcrest (AM-80)
- USS Chaffinch (AM-81)

Adroit class

All ships of this class were built on PC-461 class submarine chaser hulls, were deemed unsatisfactory as minesweepers, and so were converted back into submarine chasers.

- USS Adroit (AM-82), later PC-1586
- USS Advent (AM-83), later PC-1587
- USS Annoy (AM-84), later PC-1588
- USS Conflict (AM-85), later PC-1589
- USS Constant (AM-86), later PC-1590
- USS Daring (AM-87), later PC-1591
- USS Dash (AM-88), later PC-1592
- USS Despite (AM-89), later PC-1593
- USS Direct (AM-90), later PC-1594
- USS Dynamic (AM-91), later PC-1595
- USS Effective (AM-92), later PC-1596
- USS Engage (AM-93), later PC-1597
- USS Excel (AM-94), later PC-1598
- USS Exploit (AM-95), later PC-1599
- USS Fidelity (AM-96), later PC-1600
- USS Fierce (AM-97), later PC-1601
- USS Firm (AM-98), later PC-1602
- USS Force (AM-99), later PC-1603

Hawk class

- USS Hawk (AM-133)
- USS Ibis (AM-134)
- USS Merganser (AM-135)

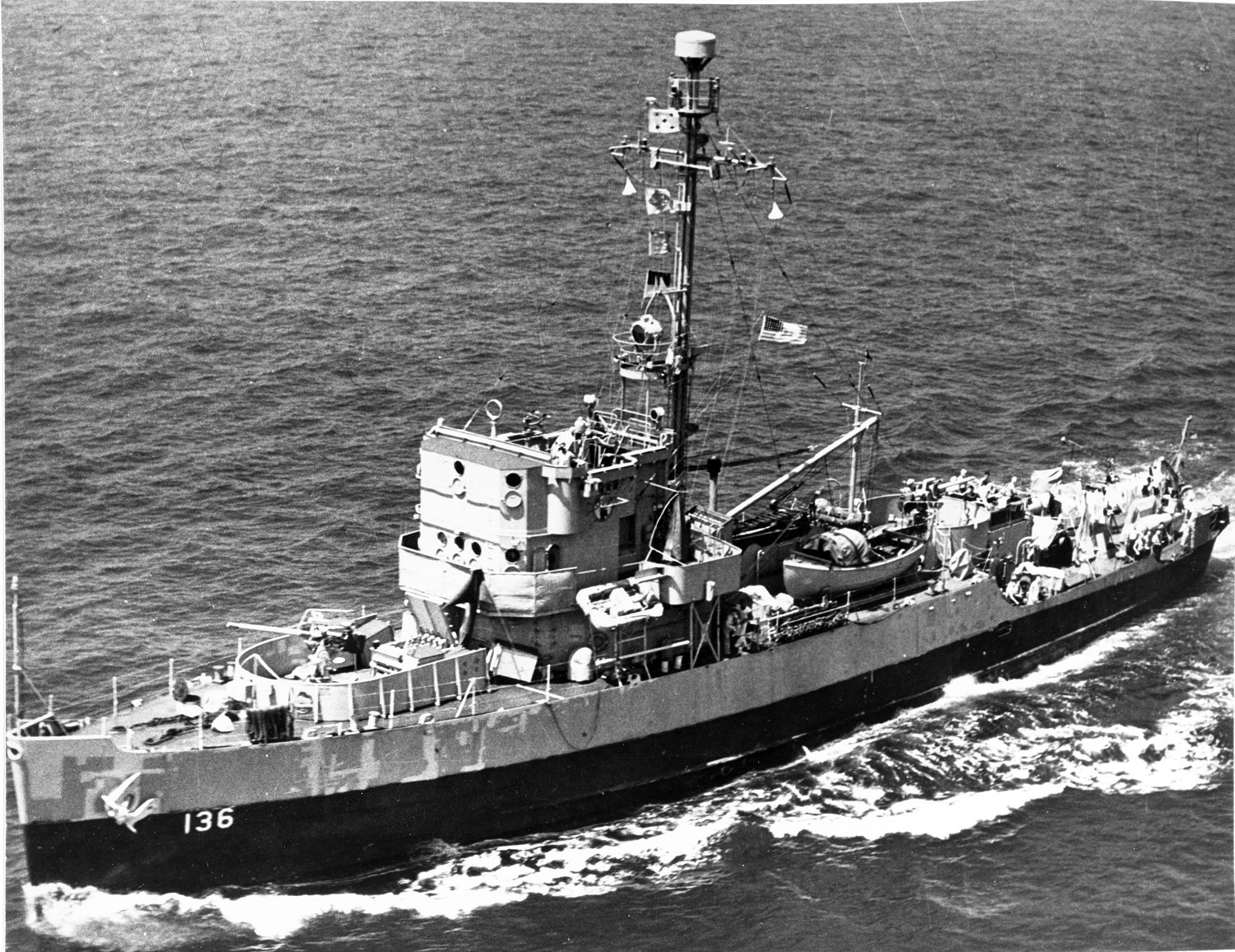
USS Admirable (AM-136)

Admirable class

All 1945 transfers to the Soviet Union (USSR) occurred under Project Hula.
The Admirable class became Minesweepers, steel hulled (MSF) on 7 February 1955.

- USS Admirable (AM-136), to USSR 19 July 1945
- USS Adopt (AM-137), to USSR 19 July 1945
- USS Advocate (AM-138)
- USS Agent (AM-139)
- USS Alarm (AM-140)
- USS Alchemy (AM-141)
- USS Apex (AM-142)
- USS Arcade (AM-143)
- USS Arch (AM-144)
- USS Armada (AM-145)
- USS Aspire (AM-146)
- USS Assail (AM-147)
- USS Astute (AM-148), to USSR 19 July 1945
- USS Augury (AM-149), to USSR 19 July 1945
- USS Barrier (AM-150), to USSR 19 July 1945
- USS Bombard (AM-151), to USSR 19 July 1945
- USS Bond (AM-152)
- USS Buoyant (AM-153)
- USS Candid (AM-154)
- USS Capable (AM-155)
- USS Captivate (AM-156)
- USS Caravan (AM-157)
- USS Caution (AM-158)
- USS Change (AM-159)
- USS Clamour (AM-160)
- USS Climax (AM-161)
- USS Compel (AM-162)
- USS Concise (AM-163)
- USS Control (AM-164)
- USS Counsel (AM-165)
- AM-166 through AM-208 – canceled 9 April 1942
- AM-209 through AM-213 – canceled 10 April 1942
- USS Crag (AM-214)
- USS Cruise (AM-215)
- USS Deft (AM-216)
- USS Delegate (AM-217)
- USS Density (AM-218)
- USS Design (AM-219)
- USS Device (AM-220)
- USS Diploma (AM-221)
- USS Disdain (AM-222), to USSR 22 May 1945
- USS Dour (AM-223)
- USS Eager (AM-224)
- USS Elusive (AM-225)
- USS Embattle (AM-226)
- USS Embroil (AM-227) – canceled June 6, 1944
- USS Enhance (AM-228) – canceled June 6, 1944
- USS Equity (AM-229) – canceled June 6, 1944
- USS Esteem (AM-230) – canceled June 6, 1944
- USS Event (AM-231) – canceled June 6, 1944
- USS Execute (AM-232)
- USS Facility (AM-233)
- USS Fancy (AM-234), to USSR 21 May 1945
- USS Fixity (AM-235)
- USS Flame (AM-236) – canceled June 6, 1944
- USS Fortify (AM-237) – canceled June 6, 1944
- USS Garland (AM-238)
- USS Gayety (AM-239)
- USS Hazard (AM-240), museum ship
- USS Hilarity (AM-241)
- USS Inaugural (AM-242)
- USS Illusive (AM-243) – canceled June 6, 1944
- USS Imbue (AM-244) – canceled June 6, 1944
- USS Impervious (AM-245) – canceled June 6, 1944
- USS Implicit (AM-246)
- USS Improve (AM-247)
- USS Incessant (AM-248)
- USS Incredible (AM-249)
- USS Indicative (AM-250), to USSR 22 May 1945
- USS Inflict (AM-251)
- USS Instill (AM-252)
- USS Intrigue (AM-253)
- USS Invade (AM-254)
- USS Jubilant (AM-255)
- USS Knave (AM-256)
- USS Lance (AM-257)
- USS Logic (AM-258)
- USS Lucid (AM-259)
- USS Magnet (AM-260)
- USS Mainstay (AM-261)
- USS Marvel (AM-262), to USSR 21 May 1945
- USS Measure (AM-263), to USSR 21 May 1945
- USS Method (AM-264), to USSR 21 May 1945
- USS Mirth (AM-265), to USSR 21 May 1945
- USS Nimble (AM-266)
- USS Notable (AM-267)
- USS Nucleus (AM-268), to USSR 21 May 1945
- USS Opponent (AM-269)
- USS Palisade (AM-270), to USSR 22 May 1945
- USS Penetrate (AM-271), to USSR 22 May 1945
- USS Peril (AM-272), to USSR 22 May 1945
- USS Phantom (AM-273)
- USS Pinnacle (AM-274)
- USS Pirate (AM-275), sunk by mine off Wonsan, Korea, 12 October 1950, 13 missing or killed
- USS Pivot (AM-276)
- USS Pledge (AM-277), sunk by mine off Wonsan, Korea, 10 October 1950
- USS Project (AM-278)
- USS Prime (AM-279)
- USS Prowess (AM-280)
- USS Quest (AM-281)
- USS Rampart (AM-282), to USSR 21 May 1945
- USS Ransom (AM-283)
- USS Rebel (AM-284)
- USS Recruit (AM-285)
- USS Reform (AM-286)
- USS Refresh (AM-287)
- USS Reign (AM-288)
- USS Report (AM-289)
- USS Reproof (AM-290) – canceled December 1, 1944
- USS Risk (AM-291) – canceled November 1, 1945
- USS Rival (AM-292) – canceled June 6, 1944
- USS Sagacity (AM-293) – canceled June 6, 1944
- USS Salute (AM-294), sunk by mine off Brunei 8 June 1945
- USS Saunter (AM-295)
- USS Scout (AM-296)
- USS Scrimmage (AM-297)
- USS Scuffle (AM-298)
- USS Sentry (AM-299)
- USS Serene (AM-300)
- USS Shelter (AM-301)
- USS Signet (AM-302)
- USS Skirmish (AM-303)
- USS Scurry (AM-304)
- USS Spectacle (AM-305)
- USS Specter (AM-306)
- USS Staunch (AM-307)
- USS Strategy (AM-308)
- USS Strength (AM-309)
- USS Success (AM-310)
- USS Superior (AM-311)
- USS Creddock (AM-356)
- USS Dipper (AM-357)
- USS Dotterel (AM-358) – canceled November 1, 1945
- USS Drake (AM-359)
- USS Driver (AM-360) – canceled November 1, 1945
- USS Dunlin (AM-361)
- USS Gadwall (AM-362)
- USS Gavia (AM-363)
- USS Graylag (AM-364)
- USS Harlequin (AM-365)
- USS Harrier (AM-366)
- USS Hummer (AM-367) – canceled June 6, 1944
- USS Jackdaw (AM-368) – canceled June 6, 1944
- USS Merdick (AM-369) – canceled June 6, 1944
- USS Minah (AM-370) – canceled June 6, 1944
- USS Albatross (AM-391) – canceled November 1, 1945
- USS Bullfinch (AM-392) – canceled November 1, 1945
- USS Cardinal (AM-393) – canceled November 1, 1945
- USS Firecrest (AM-394) – canceled November 1, 1945
- USS Goldfinch (AM-395) – canceled November 1, 1945
- USS Grackle (AM-396) – canceled August 11, 1945
- USS Grosbeak (AM-397) – canceled August 11, 1945
- USS Grouse (AM-398) – canceled August 11, 1945
- USS Gull (AM-399) – canceled August 11, 1945
- USS Hawk (AM-400) – canceled August 11, 1945
- USS Hummer (AM-401) – canceled August 11, 1945
- USS Jackdaw (AM-402) – canceled August 11, 1945
- USS Kite (AM-403) – canceled August 11, 1945
- USS Longspur (AM-404) – canceled August 11, 1945
- USS Merganser (AM-405) – canceled August 11, 1945
- USS Osprey (AM-406) – canceled August 11, 1945
- USS Partridge (AM-407) – canceled August 11, 1945
- USS Plover (AM-408) – canceled August 11, 1945
- USS Redhead (AM-409) – canceled August 11, 1945
- USS Sanderling (AM-410) – canceled August 11, 1945
- USS Scaup (AM-411) – canceled August 11, 1945
- USS Sentinel (AM-412) – canceled August 11, 1945
- USS Shearwater (AM-413) – canceled August 11, 1945
- USS Waxbill (AM-414) – canceled August 11, 1945
- USS Bluebird (AM-415) – canceled August 11, 1945
- USS Flicker (AM-416) – canceled August 11, 1945
- USS Linnet (AM-417) – canceled August 11, 1945
- USS Magpie (AM-418) – canceled August 11, 1945
- USS Parrakeet (AM-419) – canceled August 11, 1945
- USS Pipit (AM-420) – canceled August 11, 1945

Algerine class (built for the United Kingdom)

These minesweepers were built for the U.K. and redesignated from an AM hull number to a J hull number. Most were returned to the US at the end of Lend-Lease.

- HMS Antares (AM-325)
- HMS Arcturus (AM-326)
- HMS Aries (AM-327)
- HMS Clinton (AM-328)
- HMS Friendship (AM-329)
- USS Gozo (AM-330)
- USS Lightfoot (AM-331)
- HMS Melita (AM-332)
- HMS Octavia (AM-333)
- HMS Persian (AM-334)
- HMS Postillion (AM-335)
- HMS Skipjack (AM-336)
- HMS Trisbe (AM-337)
- HMS True Love (AM-338)
- HMS Welfare (AM-339)

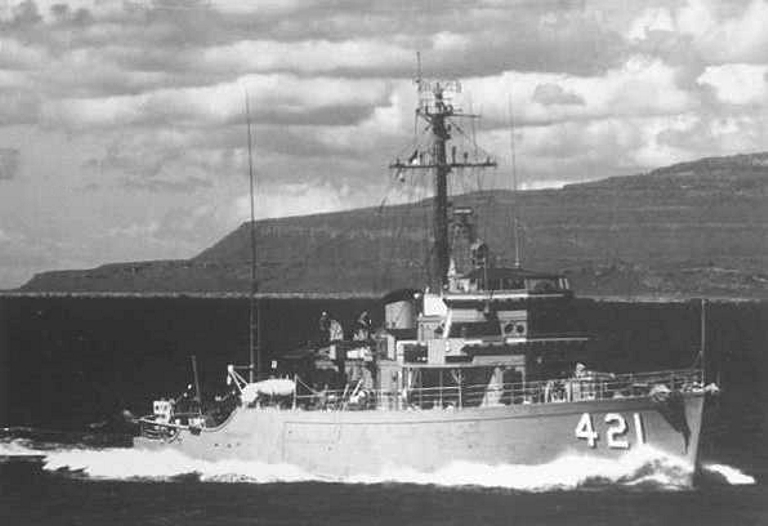
USS Agile (AM-421) as (MSO-421)

Agile class and Aggressive class

These classes have considerable overlap; some ships are considered both Agile and Agreessive class. A few more are occasionally considered Dash class. These classes became Minesweepers, ocean (MSO) on 7 February 1955.

- USS Agile (AM-421)
- USS Aggressive (AM-422)
- USS Avenge (AM-423)
- USS Bold (AM-424)
- USS Bulwark (AM-425)
- USS Conflict (AM-426)
- USS Constant (AM-427)
- USS Dash (AM-428)
- USS Detector (AM-429)
- USS Direct (AM-430)
- USS Dominant (AM-431)
- USS Dynamic (AM-432)
- USS Engage (AM-433)
- USS Embattle (AM-434)
- USS Endurance (AM-435)
- USS Energy (AM-436)
- USS Enhance (AM-437)
- USS Esteem (AM-438)
- USS Excel (AM-439)
- USS Exploit (AM-440)
- USS Exultant (AM-441)
- USS Fearless (AM-442)
- USS Fidelity (AM-443)
- USS Firm (AM-444)
- USS Force (AM-445)
- USS Fortify (AM-446)
- USS Guide (AM-447)
- USS Illusive (AM-448)
- USS Impervious (AM-449)
- AM-450 – to France as Berneval (M 613)
- AM-451 – to France as Bir Hakeim (M 614) then to Uruguay as Maldonado (MS 33)
- AM-452 – to France as Garigliano (M 617)
- AM-453 – to France as Alencon (M 612)
- AM-454 – to France as Dompaire (M 616)
- USS Implicit (AM-455)
- USS Inflict (AM-456)
- USS Loyalty (AM-457)
- USS Lucid (AM-458)
- USS Nimble (AM-459)
- USS Notable (AM-460)
- USS Observer (AM-461)
- USS Pinnacle (AM-462)
- USS Pivot (AM-463)
- USS Pluck (AM-464)
- USS Prestige (AM-465)
- USS Prime (AM-466)
- USS Reaper (AM-467)
- USS Rival (AM-468)
- USS Sagacity (AM-469)
- USS Salute (AM-470)
- USS Skill (AM-471)
- USS Valor (AM-472)
- USS Vigor (AM-473)
- USS Vital (AM-474)
- AM-475 – to France as Mytho (M 618)
- AM-476 – to France as Cantho M 615
- AM-477 – to France as Vinh Long M 619
- AM-478 – to Portugal as Sao Jorge (M 415)
- AM-479– to Portugal as Pico (M 416)
- AM-480 – to the Netherlands as Onversaagd (M 884)
- AM-481 – to the Netherlands as Onbevreesd (M 885)
- AM-482 – to the Netherlands as Onvervaard (M 888)
- AM-483 – to the Netherlands as Onverschrokken (M 886)
- AM-484 – to the Netherlands as Onvermoeid (M 887)
- AM-485 – to the Netherlands as Onverdroten (M 889)
- AM-486 – to Portugal as Graciosa (M 417)
- AM-487 – to Portugal as Corvo (M 418)
- USS Conquest (AM-488)
- USS Gallant (AM-489)
- USS Leader (AM-490)
- USS Persistent (AM-491)
- USS Pledge (AM-492)
- USS Stalwart (AM-493)
- USS Sturdy (AM-494)
- USS Swerve (AM-495)
- USS Venture (AM-496)
- AM-498 – to Norway as Lagen (M 950), then to Belgium as Dufour (M 903)
- AM-499 – to Norway as Namsen (M 951), then to Belgium as De Brouwer (M 904)
- AM-500 – to France as Berlaimont (M 620)
- AM-501 – to France as Origny (M 621)
- AM-502 – to France as Autun (M 622)
- AM-503 – to Belgium as Artevelde (M 907)
- AM-504 – to Belgium as Breydel (M 906)
- AM-505 – to France as Baccarat (M 623)
- AM-506 – to Italy as Storione (M 5431)
- AM-507 – to Italy as Salmone (M 5430)
- AM-512 – to France as Narvik (M 609)
- AM-513 – to France as Ouistreham (M 610)
- AM-514 – to France as Colmar (M 624)
- AM-515 – to Belgium as Georges Truffaut (M 908)
- AM-516 – to Belgium as F. Bovesse (M 909)
- AM-517 – to Italy as Sgombro (M 5432)
- AM-518 – to Italy as Squalo (M 5433)

Accentor or Acme class

The Acme class became Minesweepers, ocean (MSO) on 7 February 1955.

- USS Acme (AM-508)
- USS Adroit (AM-509)
- USS Advance (AM-510)
- USS Affray (AM-511)

Ability class

The Ability class became Minesweepers, Ocean (MSO) on 7 February 1955.

- USS Ability (AM-519)
- USS Alacrity (AM-520)
- USS Assurance (AM-521)

Other/unknown class

- USS Flicker (AM-70), later IX-165
- USS Grackle (AM-73)
- USS Gull (AM-74)
- USS Goldfinch (AM-77)
- USS Goldcrest (AM-78), later Agate (PYc-4)
- USS Eagle (AM-132), later Captor (PYc-40), a Q-ship (armed decoy)
- USS Overseer (AM-321) – built for U.K. December 22, 1943
- AM-342 through AM-350 – hull numbers not used
- USS Adjutant (AM-351) – canceled November 1, 1945
- USS Bittern (AM-352) – canceled November 1, 1945
- USS Breakhorn (AM-353) – canceled November 1, 1945
- USS Cariama (AM-354) – canceled November 1, 1945
- USS Chukor (AM-355) – canceled November 1, 1945

== Auxiliary base minesweepers (AMb) ==
- USS Raymonde (AMb-17), later YP-375, IX-199

== Coastal minesweepers (AMc) ==
Pipit class

- USS Pipit (AMc-1)
- USS Magpie (AMc-2)
- USS Plover (AMc-3)

Goshawk class

- USS Goshawk (AMc-4), later AM-79

Chatterer class

- USS Chatterer (AMc-16)

Grosbeak class

- USS Grosbeak (AMc-19)

Crow class

- USS Crow (AMc-20), sunk during torpedo training session, Puget Sound, 23 August 1943

Egret class

- USS Egret (AMc-24), later IX-181

Frigate Bird class

- USS Frigate Bird (AMc-27)

Reedbird class

- USS Reedbird (AMc-30)

Firecrest class

- USS Firecrest (AMc-33)

Accentor class

- USS Accentor (AMc-36)
- USS Bateleur (AMc-37)
- USS Barbet (AMc-38)
- USS Brambling (AMc-39)
- USS Caracara (AMc-40)
- USS Chachalaca (AMc-41)
- USS Chimango (AMc-42)
- USS Cotinga (AMc-43)
- USS Courlan (AMc-44)
- USS Develin (AMc-45)
- USS Fulmar (AMc-46)
- USS Jacamar (AMc-47)
- USS Limpkin (AMc-48)
- USS Lorikeet (AMc-49)
- USS Marabout (AMc-50)
- USS Ostrich (AMc-51)
- USS Roller (AMc-52)
- USS Skimmer (AMc-53)
- USS Tapacola (AMc-54), later IX-230
- USS Turaco (AMc-55)
- USS Acme (AMc-61)
- USS Adamant (AMc-62)
- USS Advance (AMc-63)
- USS Aggressor (AMc-64)
- USS Assertive (AMc-65)
- USS Avenge (AMc-66)
- USS Bold (AMc-67)
- USS Bulwark (AMc-68)
- USS Combat (AMc-69)
- USS Conqueror (AMc-70)
- USS Conquest (AMc-71)
- USS Courier (AMc-72)
- USS Defiance (AMc-73)
- USS Demand (AMc-74)
- USS Detector (AMc-75)
- USS Dominant (AMc-76)
- USS Endurance (AMc-77)
- USS Energy (AMc-78)
- USS Exultant (AMc-79), later YTD-4
- USS Fearless (AMc-80)
- USS Fortitude (AMc-81)
- USS Governor (AMc-82)
- USS Guide (AMc-83)
- USS Heroic (AMc-84)
- USS Ideal (AMc-85)
- USS Industry (AMc-86), wrecked by Typhoon Louise Okinawa October 1945
- USS Liberator (AMc-87), later IX-202
- USS Loyalty (AMc-88)
- USS Memorable (AMc-89)
- USS Merit (AMc-90)
- USS Observer (AMc-91)
- USS Paramount (AMc-92)
- USS Peerless (AMc-93)
- USS Pluck (AMc-94)
- USS Positive (AMc-95)
- USS Power (AMc-96)
- USS Prestige (AMc-97)
- USS Progress (AMc-98)
- USS Radiant (AMc-99)
- USS Reliable (AMc-100)
- USS Rocket (AMc-101)
- USS Royal (AMc-102)
- USS Security (AMc-103)
- USS Skipper (AMc-104)
- USS Stalwart (AMc-105), later IX-231
- USS Summit (AMc-106), later IX-232
- USS Trident (AMc-107)
- USS Valor (AMc-108), sunk in collision Buzzards Bay 29 June 1944, 7 killed
- USS Victor (AMc-109)
- USS Vigor (AMc-110)

Agile class

- USS Agile (AMc-111), later IX-203

Acme class

- USS Affray (AMc-112)

Admirable class

- USS Admirable (AMc-113)
- USS Adopt (AMc-114)
- USS Advocate (AMc-115)
- USS Agent (AMc-116)
- USS Alarm (AMc-117)
- USS Alchemy (AMc-118)
- USS Apex (AMc-119)
- USS Arcade (AMc-120)
- USS Arch (AMc-121)
- USS Armada (AMc-122)
- USS Aspire (AMc-123)
- USS Assail (AMc-124)
- USS Astute (AMc-125)
- USS Augury (AMc-126)
- USS Barrier (AMc-127)
- USS Bombard (AMc-128)
- USS Bond (AMc-129)
- USS Buoyant (AMc-130)
- USS Candid (AMc-131)
- USS Capable (AMc-132)
- USS Captivate (AMc-133)
- USS Caravan (AMc-134)
- USS Caution (AMc-135)
- USS Change (AMc-136)
- USS Clamour (AMc-137)
- USS Climax (AMc-138)
- USS Compel (AMc-139)
- USS Concise (AMc-140)
- USS Control (AMc-141)
- USS Counsel (AMc-142)

PCS-1376 class

The PCS-1376 class of coastal minesweepers were originally Patrol Craft Sweepers (PCS) which lacked minesweeping gear. They were built on 134-foot YMS-1-class minesweeper hulls and then converted into sonar school ships or back into minesweepers.

- USS Medrick (AMc-203), ex-PCS-1466
- USS Minah (AMc-204), ex-PCS-1465, later AMCU-14

Other/unknown classes

Many coastal minesweepers were civilian ships purchased by the US Navy and then converted for use as minesweeper ships. Among them are various designs and makes of yachts, fishing vessels, and other ships.

- USS Kestrel (AMc-5), later IX-175
- USS Heath Hen (AMc-6)
- USS Bunting (AMc-7), sunk in collision 3 June 1942
- USS Cockatoo (AMc-8)
- USS Crossbill (AMc-9)
- USS Longspur (AMc-10)
- USS Sanderling (AMc-11)
- USS Grouse (AMc-12)
- USS Hornbill (AMc-13), sunk in collision 30 June 1942
- USS Condor (AMc-14)
- USS Waxbill (AMc-15)
- USS Pintail (AMc-17)
- USS Nightingale (AMc-18)
- USS Killdeer (AMc-21), later IX-194
- USS Flamingo (AMc-22), later IX-180
- USS Blue Jay (AMc-23), later YDT-6
- USS Canary (AMc-25), later YDT-7
- USS Humming Bird (AMc-26)
- USS Mockingbird (AMc-28)
- USS Puffin (AMc-29)
- USS Sparrow (AMc-31), later YN-53
- USS Courser (AMc-32)
- USS Parrakeet (AMc-34)
- USS Road Runner (AMc-35)
- USS Kingbird (AMc-56), later IX-176
- USS Phoebe (AMc-57)
- USS Rhea (AMc-58)
- USS Ruff (AMc-59)
- USS Chanticleer (AMc-60)
- USS AMc-143
- USS AMc-144
- USS AMc-145
- USS AMc-146
- USS AMc-147
- USS AMc-148
- USS Nightingale (AMc-149), ex-YP-150, later IX-177
- USS AMc-150
- USS AMc-151
- USS AMc-152
- USS AMc-153
- USS AMc-154
- USS AMc-155
- USS AMc-156
- USS AMc-157
- USS AMc-158
- USS AMc-159
- USS AMc-160
- USS AMc-161
- USS AMc-162
- USS AMc-163
- USS AMc-164
- USS AMc-165
- USS AMc-166
- USS AMc-167
- USS AMc-168
- USS AMc-169
- USS AMc-170
- USS AMc-171
- USS AMc-172
- USS AMc-173
- USS AMc-174
- USS AMc-175
- USS AMc-176
- USS AMc-177
- USS AMc-178
- USS AMc-179
- USS AMc-180
- USS AMc-181
- USS AMc-182
- USS AMc-183
- USS AMc-184
- USS AMc-185
- USS AMc-186
- USS AMc-187
- USS AMc-188
- USS AMc-189
- USS AMc-190
- USS AMc-191
- USS AMc-192
- USS AMc-193
- USS AMc-194
- USS AMc-195
- USS AMc-196
- USS AMc-197
- USS AMc-198
- USS AMc-199
- USS AMc-200
- USS AMc-201
- AMc-202, later YP-389

== Coastal minesweepers (Underwater locator) (AMCU) ==
On 7 February 1955, all AMCU's were redesignated as Coastal minehunters (MHC). Hull numbers were not changed.

AMCU-7 class

All AMCU-7 class minesweepers were conversions of Landing Craft Infantry (LCI).

- USS AMCU-7, ex-LCI-589
- USS AMCU-8, ex-LCI-400
- USS AMCU-9, ex-LCI-409
- USS AMCU-10, ex-LCI-513
- USS Blackbird (AMCU-11), ex-LCI-514
- USS Accentor (AMCU-15), ex-LCI-652, conversion canceled
- USS Avocet (AMCU-16), ex-LCI-653
- USS Blue Jay (AMCU-17), ex-LCI-654, not commissioned
- USS Chaffinch (AMCU-18), ex-LCI-694, not commissioned
- USS Chewink (AMCU-19), ex-LCI-701, not commissioned
- USS Chimango (AMCU-20), ex-LCI-703, not commissioned
- USS Cockatoo (AMCU-21), ex-LCI-709
- USS Cotinga (AMCU-22), ex-LCI-776, not commissioned
- USS Dunlin (AMCU-23), ex-LCI-777, conversion canceled
- USS Goldcrest (AMCU-24), ex-LCI-869
- USS Jacamar (AMCU-25), ex-LCI-870
- USS Kestrel (AMCU-26), ex-LCI-874
- USS Killdeer (AMCU-27), ex-LCI-883, conversion canceled
- USS Longspur (AMCU-28), ex-LCI-884
- USS Magpie (AMCU-29), ex-LCI-944, not commissioned
- USS Mallard (AMCU-30), ex-LCI-963, not commissioned
- USS Medrick (AMCU-31), ex-LCI-966, conversion canceled
- USS Minivet (AMCU-32), ex-LCI-969, conversion canceled
- USS Oriole (AMCU-33), ex-LCI-973
- USS Ortolan (AMCU-34), ex-LCI-976
- USS Owl (AMCU-35), ex-LCI-982
- USS Partridge (AMCU-36), ex-LCI-1001, conversion canceled
- USS Rail (AMCU-37), ex-LCI-1022
- USS Sandpiper (AMCU-38), ex-LCI-1008
- USS Sentinel (AMCU-39), ex-LCI-1052, not commissioned
- USS Shearwater (AMCU-40), ex-LCI-882, conversion canceled
- USS Skimmer (AMCU-41), ex-LCI-1093
- USS Sparrow (AMCU-42), ex-LCI-1098

YMS-1 class

- USS Harkness (AMCU-12), ex-YMS-242, AGS-12, AGSC-12
- USS James M. Gilliss (AMCU-13), ex-YMS-262, AGS-13, AGSC-13
- USS Gull (AMCU-46), ex-YMS-324, AMS-16
- USS Merganser (AMCU-47), ex-YMS-417, AMS-26
- USS Redhead (AMCU-48), ex-YMS-443, AMS-34
- USS Sanderling (AMCU-49), ex-PCS-1393, YMS-446, AMS-35
- USS Waxbill (AMCU-50), ex-PCS-1456, YMS-479, AMS-39

PCS-1376 class

- USS Minah (AMCU-14), ex-PCS-1465, AMc-204

Other/unknown classes

- USS AMCU-1
- USS AMCU-2
- USS AMCU-3
- USS AMCU-4
- USS AMCU-5
- USS AMCU-6
- USS Bittern (AMCU-43)

== Ocean minesweepers (AMS) ==
YMS-1 class

- USS Albatross (AMS-1), ex-YMS-80, later EMSC(O)-1
- USS Bobolink (AMS-2), ex-YMS-164, later MHC-44
- USS Bunting (AMS-3), ex-YMS-170, later MHC-45
- USS Cardinal (AMS-4), ex-YMS-179, later MSC(O)-4
- USS Condor (AMS-5), ex-YMS-192, later MSC(O)-5
- USS Courser (AMS-6), ex-YMS-201, later MSC(O)-6
- USS Crow (AMS-7), ex-YMS-215
- USS Curlew (AMS-8), ex-YMS-218, later MSC(O)-8
- USS Flicker (AMS-9), ex-YMS-219, later MSC(O)-9
- USS Firecrest (AMS-10), ex-YMS-231, later MSC(O)-10
- USS Flamingo (AMS-11), ex-YMS-238, later MSC(O)-11
- USS Goldfinch (AMS-12), ex-YMS-306, later MSO(O)-12
- USS Grackle (AMS-13), ex-YMS-312, later MSC(O)-13
- USS Grosbeak (AMS-14), ex-YMS-317
- USS Grouse (AMS-15), ex-YMS-321, later MSC(O)-15
- USS Gull (AMS-16), ex-YMS-324, later AMCU-46
- USS Hawk (AMS-17), ex-YMS-362, later MSC(O)-17
- USS Heron (AMS-18), ex-YMS-369, later MSC(O)-18
- USS Hornbill (AMS-19), ex-YMS-371, later MSC(O)-19
- USS Hummer (AMS-20), ex-YMS-372, later MSC(O)-20
- USS Jackdaw (AMS-21), ex-YMS-373
- USS Kite (AMS-22), ex-YMS-374, later MSC(O)-22
- USS Lark (AMS-23), ex-YMS-376, later MSC(O)-23
- USS Linnet (AMS-24), ex-YMS-395, later MSC(O)-24
- USS Magpie (AMS-25), ex-YMS-400, sunk by mine off Chusan Po, Korea, 1 Oct 1950, 21 killed
- USS Merganser (AMS-26), ex-YMS-417, later AMCU-47
- USS Mockingbird (AMS-27), ex-YMS-419, later MSC(O)-27
- USS Osprey (AMS-28), ex-YMS-422, later MSC(O)-28
- USS Ostrich (AMS-29), ex-YMS-430, later MSC(O)-29
- USS Parakeet (AMS-30), ex-YMS–434, grounded 30 Mar 1949
- USS Partridge (AMS-31), ex-YMS-437, sunk by mine in Wonsan harbor, Korea, 2 Feb 1951, 8 killed
- USS Pelican (AMS-32), ex-YMS-441, later MSC(O)-32
- USS Plover (AMS-33), ex-YMS-442, later MSC(O)-33
- USS Redhead (AMS-34), ex-YMS-443, later AMCU-48
- USS Sanderling (AMS-35), ex-YMS-446, later AMCU-49
- USS Swallow (AMS-36), ex-YMS-461, later MSC(O)-36
- USS Swan (AMS-37), ex-YMS-470, later MSC(O)-37
- USS Verdin (AMS-38), ex-YMS-471, later MSC(O)-38
- USS Waxbill (AMS-39), ex-YMS-479, later AMCU-50
- USS Chatterer (AMS-40), ex-YMS-415, later MSC(O)-40
- USS Barbet (AMS-41), ex-YMS-45, later MSC(O)-41
- USS Brambling (AMS-42), ex-YMS-109, later MSC(O)-42
- USS Brant (AMS-43), ex-YMS-113, later MSC(O)-43
- USS Courlan (AMS-44), ex-YMS-114, later MSC(O)-44
- USS Crossbill (AMS-45), ex-YMS-120, later MSC(O)-45
- USS Egret (AMS-46), ex-YMS-136, later MSC(O)-46
- USS Fulmar (AMS-47), ex-YMS-193, later MSC(O)-47
- USS Lapwing (AMS-48), ex-YMS-268, later MSC(O)-48
- USS Lorikeet (AMS-49), ex-YMS-271, later MSC(O)-49
- USS Nightingale (AMS-50), ex-YMS-290, later MSC(O)-50
- USS Reedbird (AMS-51), ex-YMS-291, later MSC(O)-51
- USS Rhea (AMS-52), ex-YMS-299, later MSC(O)-52
- USS Robin (AMS-53), ex-YMS-311, later MSC(O)-53
- USS Ruff (AMS-54), ex-YMS-327, later MSC(O)-54
- USS Seagull (AMS-55), ex-YMS-402, later MCS(O)-55
- USS Turkey (AMS-56), ex-YMS-444, later MSC(O)-56
- USS Redpoll (AMS-57), ex-YMS-294, later MSC(O)-57
- USS Siskin (AMS-58), ex-YMS-425, later MSC(O)-58

Adjutant class or Bluebird class

The name of this class of ships internationally is Adjutant, named for the USS Adjutant (AMS-60), which was cancelled and transferred to Portugal as the Ponta Delgada (M 405). The first commissioned ship of this class in the US Navy was the USS Bluebird (AMS-121), hence its US Navy class name. This class became Minesweepers, coastal (MSC) on 7 February 1955.

- USS Adjutant (AMS-60) (transferred to Portugal)
- USS Bittern (AMS-69) (transferred to France)
- USS Chukor (AMS-70) (transferred to France)
- USS Dotterel (AMS-72) (transferred to Italy)
- USS Macaw (AMS-77) (transferred to Belgium)
- USS Bluebird (AMS-121)
- USS Cormorant (AMS-122)
- USS Falcon (AMS-190)
- USS Frigate Bird (AMS-191)
- USS Hummingbird (AMS-192)
- USS Jacana (AMS-193)
- USS Kingbird (AMS-194)
- USS Limpkin (AMS-195)
- USS Meadowlark (AMS-196)
- USS Parrot (AMS-197)
- USS Peacock (AMS-198)
- USS Phoebe (AMS-199)
- USS Redwing (AMS-200)
- USS Shrike (AMS-201)
- USS Spoonbill (AMS-202)
- USS Thrasher (AMS-203)
- USS Thrush (AMS-204)
- USS Vireo (AMS-205)
- USS Warbler (AMS-206)
- USS Whippoorwill (AMS-207)
- USS Widgeon (AMS-208)
- USS Woodpecker (AMS-209)

Albatross class

The Albatross class became Minesweepers, coastal (MSC) on 7 February 1955.

- USS Albatross (AMS-289)
- USS Gannet (AMS-290)

Other/unknown classes

- USS AMS-59
- USS AMS-61
- USS AMS-62
- USS AMS-63
- USS AMS-64
- USS AMS-65
- USS AMS-66
- USS AMS-67
- USS AMS-68
- USS AMS-71
- USS AMS-73
- USS AMS-74
- USS AMS-75
- USS AMS-76
- USS AMS-78
- USS AMS-79
- USS AMS-80
- USS AMS-81
- USS AMS-82
- USS AMS-83
- USS AMS-84
- USS AMS-85
- USS AMS-86
- USS AMS-87
- USS AMS-88
- USS AMS-89
- USS AMS-90
- USS AMS-91
- USS AMS-92
- USS AMS-93
- USS AMS-94
- USS AMS-95
- USS AMS-96
- USS AMS-97
- USS AMS-98
- USS AMS-99
- USS AMS-100
- USS AMS-101
- USS AMS-102
- USS AMS-103
- USS AMS-104
- USS AMS-105
- USS AMS-106
- USS AMS-107
- USS AMS-108
- USS AMS-109
- USS AMS-110
- USS AMS-111
- USS AMS-112
- USS AMS-113
- USS AMS-114
- USS AMS-115
- USS AMS-116
- USS AMS-117
- USS AMS-118
- USS AMS-119
- USS AMC-120
- USS AMS-123
- USS AMS-124
- USS AMS-125
- USS AMS-126
- USS AMS-127
- USS AMS-128
- USS AMS-129
- USS AMS-130
- USS AMS-131
- USS AMS-132
- USS AMS-133
- USS AMS-134
- USS AMS-135
- USS AMS-136
- USS AMS-137
- USS AMS-138
- USS AMS-139
- USS AMS-140
- USS AMS-141
- USS AMS-142
- USS AMS-143
- USS AMS-144
- USS AMS-145
- USS AMS-146
- USS AMS-147
- USS AMS-148
- USS AMS-149
- USS AMS-150
- USS AMS-151
- USS AMS-152
- USS AMS-153
- USS AMS-154
- USS AMS-155
- USS AMS-156
- USS AMS-157
- USS AMS-158
- USS AMS-159
- USS AMS-160
- USS AMS-161
- USS AMS-162
- USS AMS-163
- USS AMS-164
- USS AMS-165
- USS AMS-166
- USS AMS-167
- USS AMS-168
- USS AMS-169
- USS AMS-170
- USS AMS-171
- USS AMS-172
- USS AMS-173
- USS AMS-174
- USS AMS-175
- USS AMS-176
- USS AMS-177
- USS AMS-178
- USS AMS-179
- USS AMS-180
- USS AMS-181
- USS AMS-182
- USS AMS-183
- USS AMS-184
- USS AMS-185
- USS AMS-186
- USS AMS-187
- USS AMS-188
- USS AMS-189

== British minesweepers (BAM) ==
For more vessels of this class see Catherine class minesweeper

- USS Gazelle (BAM-17)
- USS Gorgon (BAM-18)
- USS Grecian (BAM-19)
- USS Jasper (BAM-29)

== Minelayers (CM) ==
- USS Baltimore (CM-1), ex-C-3
- USS San Francisco (CM-2), ex-C-5, later Tahoe, Yosemite

Aroostook class

- USS Aroostook (CM-3), ex-ID-1256, later AK-44
- USS Shawmut (CM-4), ex-ID-1255, later ARG-1

Catskill class

- USS Terror (CM-5), later MM-5, MMF-5
- USS Catskill (CM-6), later LSV-1, MCS-1
- USS Ozark (CM-7), later LSV-2, MCS-2

Other/unknown classes and unique ships

- USS Keokuk (CM-8), ex-AN-5, later AKN-4
- USS Monadnock (CM-9)
- USS Miantonomah (CM-10), ex-CMc-5, sunk by mine off Le Havre, France on 25 September 1944, 58 killed
- USS Salem (CM-11)
- USS Weehawken (CM-12), wrecked by Typhoon Louise Okinawa October 1945

== Coastal minelayers (CMc) ==
- USS Siren (CMc-1), later PY-13
- USS Niagara (CMc-2), later PG-52
- USS Wassuc (CMc-3)
- USS Monadnock (CMc-4)
- USS Miantonomah (CMc-5), later CM-10
- USS Keokuk (CMc-6), later AN-5, CM-8

== Light minelayers (DM) ==
Wickes class

These ships were originally designated as Wickes class destroyers and later reclassified to light minelayers around 1920.

- USS Stribling (DM-1), ex-DD-96
- USS Murray (DM-2), ex-DD-97
- USS Israel (DM-3), ex-DD-98
- USS Luce (DM-4), ex-DD-99
- USS Maury (DM-5), ex-DD-100
- USS Lansdale (DM-6), ex-DD-101
- USS Mahan (DM-7), ex-DD-102
- USS Hart (DM-8), ex-DD-110
- USS Ingraham (DM-9), ex-DD-111
- USS Ludlow (DM-10), ex-DD-112
- USS Burns (DM-11), ex-DD-171
- USS Anthony (DM-12), ex-DD-172
- USS Sproston (DM-13), ex-DD-173
- USS Rizal (DM-14), ex-DD-174
- USS Gamble (DM-15), ex-DD-123, bombed 18 February 1945, 6 killed or missing, later scuttled
- USS Ramsay (DM-16), ex-DD-124, later AG-98
- USS Montgomery (DM-17), ex-DD-121, mined 17 October 1944, 4 killed, scrapped
- USS Breese (DM-18), ex-DD-122

Clemson class

These ships were originally designated Clemson class destroyers and later reclassified as light minelayers in 1937.

- USS Tracy (DM-19), ex-DD-214
- USS Preble (DM-20), ex-DD-345, later AG-99
- USS Sicard (DM-21), ex-DD-346, later AG-100
- USS Pruitt (DM-22), ex-DD-347, later AG-101

Robert H. Smith class

These ships were originally designated Allen M. Sumner-class destroyers but were converted to Robert H. Smith class destroyer minelayers in 1944. In 1955 they would be reclassified as Fast minelayers (MMD).

- USS Robert H. Smith (DM-23)
- USS Thomas E. Fraser (DM-24)
- USS Shannon (DM-25)
- USS Harry F. Bauer (DM-26)
- USS Adams (DM-27)
- USS Tolman (DM-28)
- USS Henry A. Wiley (DM-29)
- USS Shea (DM-30), Operation Castle nuclear test participant
- USS J. William Ditter (DM-31)
- USS Lindsey (DM-32)
- USS Gwin (DM-33)
- USS Aaron Ward (DM-34)

== High speed/Destroyer minesweepers (DMS) ==
Wickes class

- USS Dorsey (DMS-1), ex-DD-117, wrecked by Typhoon Louise Okinawa October 1945
- USS Lamberton (DMS-2), ex-DD-119
- USS Boggs (DMS-3), ex-DD-138, ex-IX-36, later AG-19
- USS Elliot (DMS-4), ex-DD-146
- USS Palmer (DMS-5), ex-DD-161, sunk by Kamikaze Lingayen Gulf 7 January 1945, 28 killed and missing
- USS Hogan (DMS-6), ex-DD-178
- USS Howard (DMS-7), ex-DD-179
- USS Stansbury (DMS-8), ex-DD-180
- USS Hamilton (DMS-18), ex-DD-141

Clemson class

- USS Chandler (DMS-9), ex-DD-206, later AG-108
- USS Southard (DMS-10), ex-DD-207, wrecked by Typhoon Louise Okinawa October 1945
- USS Hovey (DMS-11), ex-DD-208, sunk by Kamikaze Lingayen Gulf 7 January 1945, 48 killed
- USS Long (DMS-12), ex-DD-209, sunk by Kamikaze Lingayen Gulf 6 January 1945
- USS Hopkins (DMS-13), ex-DD-249
- USS Zane (DMS-14), ex-DD-337, later AG-119
- USS Wasmuth (DMS-15), ex-DD-338, sunk in storm by own depth charges, 29 December 1942
- USS Trever (DMS-16), ex-DD-339, later AG-110
- USS Perry (DMS-17), ex-DD-226, sunk by mines 13 September 1944

Gleaves class

- USS Ellyson (DMS-19), ex-DD-454
- USS Hambleton (DMS-20), ex-DD-455
- USS Rodman (DMS-21), ex-DD-456
- USS Emmons (DMS-22), ex-DD-457, sunk after Kamikaze attack 6 April 1945, 60 killed
- USS Macomb (DMS-23), ex-DD-458
- USS Forrest (DMS-24), ex-DD-461
- USS Fitch (DMS-25), ex-DD-462
- USS Hobson (DMS-26), ex-DD-464, sunk in collision 26 April 1952, 176 killed
- USS Jeffers (DMS-27), ex-DD-621
- USS Harding (DMS-28), ex-DD-625
- USS Butler (DMS-29), ex-DD-636
- USS Gherardi (DMS-30), ex-DD-637
- USS Mervine (DMS-31), ex-DD-489
- USS Quick (DMS-32), ex-DD-490
- USS Carmick (DMS-33), ex-DD-493
- USS Doyle (DMS-34), ex-DD-494
- USS Endicott (DMS-35), ex-DD-495
- USS McCook (DMS-36), ex-DD-496
- USS Davison (DMS-37), ex-DD-618
- USS Thompson (DMS-38), ex-DD-627
- USS Cowie (DMS-39), ex-DD-632
- USS Knight (DMS-40), ex-DD-633
- USS Doran (DMS-41), ex-DD-634
- USS Earle (DMS-42), ex-DD-635

Fletcher class

- USS Hale (DMS-43), DD-642 – conversion canceled

== Converted steamships and freighters (ID) ==
Eight steamships and freighters laid the North Sea Mine Barrage during World War I.

- USS Aroostook (ID-1256), later CM-3, AK-44
- USS Shawmut (ID-1255), later CM-4, ARG-1
- USS Quinnebaug (ID-1687)
- USS Canandaigua (ID-1694)
- USS Roanoke (ID-1695)
- USS Canonicus (ID-1696)
- USS Housatonic (ID-1697)
- USS Saranac (ID-1702)

== Mine countermeasures ships (MCM) ==
Avenger class

- USS Avenger (MCM-1) [I]
- USS Defender (MCM-2) [I]
- USS Sentry (MCM-3) [I]
- USS Champion (MCM-4)
- USS Guardian (MCM-5), wrecked 17 January 2013 Tubbataha Reef Philippines
- USS Devastator (MCM-6) [I]
- USS Patriot (MCM-7) [A]
- USS Scout (MCM-8)
- USS Pioneer (MCM-9) [A]
- USS Warrior (MCM-10) [A]
- USS Gladiator (MCM-11) [I]
- USS Ardent (MCM-12)
- USS Dextrous (MCM-13) [I]
- USS Chief (MCM-14) [A]

== Mine countermeasures support ships (MCS) ==
Many Mine Countermeasures Support (MCS) ships were previous vehicle landing, tank landing, dock landing, or amphibious assault ships that were reclassified to the MCS type in later years.

Catskill class

- USS Catskill (MCS-1), ex-LSV-1
- USS Ozark (MCS-2), ex-LSV-2

Osage class

- USS Osage (MCS-3), ex-LSV-3, MCS conversion canceled
- USS Saugus (MCS-4), ex-LSV-4, MCS conversion canceled
- USS Monitor (MCS-5), ex-LSV-5, MCS conversion canceled

LST-542 class

- USS Orleans Parish (MCS-6), ex-LST-1069

Ashland class

- USS Epping Forest (MCS-7), ex-LSD-4

Iwo Jima class

- USS Inchon (MCS-12), ex-LPH-12

== Coastal minehunters (MHC) ==
On 7 February 1955, all Coastal minesweepers (Underwater locator) (AMCU)s were redesignated as MHCs. Hull numbers were not changed. Bobolink, Bunting, and the Osprey class never had AMCU designations.

LCI(L)-351 class aka AMCU-7 class

- USS Avocet (MHC-16)
- USS Goldcrest (MHC-24)
- USS Kestrel (MHC-26)
- USS Longspur (MHC-28)
- USS Magpie (MHC-29)
- USS Mallard (MHC-30)
- USS Minivet (MHC-32)
- USS Oriole (MHC-33)
- USS Ortolan (MHC-34)
- USS Owl (MHC-35)
- USS Partridge (MHC-36)
- USS Rail (MHC-37)
- USS Sandpiper (MHC-38)
- USS Sentinel (MHC-39)
- USS Skimmer (MHC-41)
- USS Sparrow (MHC-42)

YMS-1 class

- USS Harkness (MHC-12)
- USS James M. Gilliss (MHC-13)
- USS Bobolink (MHC-44)
- USS Bunting (MHC-45)
- USS Gull (MHC-46)
- USS Merganser (MHC-47)
- USS Redhead (MHC-48)
- USS Sanderling (MHC-49)
- USS Waxbill (MHC-50)

PCS-1376 class

- USS Minah (MHC-14)

Other/unknown classes

- USS Blackbird (MHC-11)
- USS Bittern (MHC-43)

Osprey class

- USS Osprey (MHC-51)
- USS Heron (MHC-52)
- USS Pelican (MHC-53)
- USS Robin (MHC-54)
- USS Oriole (MHC-55)
- USS Kingfisher (MHC-56)
- USS Cormorant (MHC-57)
- USS Black Hawk (MHC-58)
- USS Falcon (MHC-59)
- USS Cardinal (MHC-60)
- USS Raven (MHC-61)
- USS Shrike (MHC-62)

== Coastal minelayers (MMC) ==
Auk class

- USS Strive (MMC-1), ex-MSF-117
- USS Sustain (MMC-2), ex-MSF-119
- USS Triumph (MMC-3), ex-MSF-323
- USS MMC-4
- USS Seer (MMC-5), ex-MSF-112

LSM-1 class

At least 9 Landing Ship Medium (LSM)s were converted into coastal minelayers for transfer to NATO allies.

- USS MMC-6, ex-LSM-301
- USS MMC-7, ex-LSM-303
- USS MMC-8, ex-LSM-390
- USS MMC-9, ex-LSM-392
- USS MMC-10, ex-LSM-481
- USS MMC-11, ex-LSM-484
- USS MMC-12, ex-LSM-490
- USS MMC-13, ex-LSM-492
- USS MMC-14, ex-LSM-493

unknown class

- USS MMC-15
- USS MMC-16

== Fast minelayers (MMD) ==
Fast Minelayers (MMD) were originally classed as Light minelayers (DM), but were redesignated in 1955. Hull numbers were not changed.

Robert H. Smith class

- USS Robert H. Smith (MMD-23)
- USS Thomas E. Fraser (MMD-24)
- USS Shannon (MMD-25)
- USS Harry F. Bauer (MMD-26)
- USS Adams (MMD-27)
- USS Tolman (MMD-28)
- USS Henry A. Wiley (MMD-29)
- USS Shea (MMD-30)
- USS J. William Ditter (MMD-31)
- USS Lindsey (MMD-32)
- USS Gwin (MMD-33)

== Fleet minelayers (MMF) ==
Catskill class

- USS Terror (MMF-5), ex-CM-5, ex-MM-5

== Minesweepers, coastal (MSC) ==
All Albatross and Bluebird class MSC vessels were originally classed as Ocean minesweepers (AMS) prior to 7 February 1955. Hull numbers were not changed.

Bluebird class

- USS Bluebird (MSC-121)
- USS Cormorant (MSC-122)
- USS Falcon (MSC-190)
- USS Frigate Bird (MSC-191)
- USS Hummingbird (MSC-192)
- USS Jacana (MSC-193)
- USS Kingbird (MSC-194)
- USS Limpkin (MSC-195)
- USS Meadowlark (MSC-196)
- USS Parrot (MSC-197)
- USS Peacock (MSC-198)
- USS Phoebe (MSC-199)
- USS Redwing (MSC-200)
- USS Shrike (MSC-201)
- USS Spoonbill (MSC-202)
- USS Thrasher (MSC-203)
- USS Thrush (MSC-204)
- USS Vireo (MSC-205)
- USS Warbler (MSC-206)
- USS Whippoorwill (MSC-207)
- USS Widgeon (MSC-208)
- USS Woodpecker (MSC-209)

MSC-218 class

- USS MSC-218
- USS MSC-257

Albatross class (1960)

- USS Albatross (MSC-289)
- USS Gannet (MSC-290), Operation Dominic nuclear test participant

Unknown/other class

- USS MSC-60
- USS MSC-61
- USS MSC-62
- USS MSC-63
- USS MSC-64
- USS MSC-65
- USS MSC-66
- USS MSC-67
- USS MSC-68
- USS Bittern (MSC-69)
- USS Chukor (MSC-70)
- USS MSC-71
- USS Dotterel (MSC-72)
- USS MSC-73
- USS MSC-74
- USS MSC-75
- USS MSC-76
- USS MSC-77
- USS MSC-78
- USS MSC-79
- USS MSC-80
- USS MSC-81
- USS MSC-82
- USS MSC-83
- USS MSC-84
- USS MSC-85
- USS MSC-86
- USS MSC-87
- USS MSC-88
- USS MSC-89
- USS MSC-90
- USS MSC-91
- USS MSC-92
- USS MSC-93
- USS MSC-94
- USS MSC-95
- USS MSC-96
- USS MSC-97
- USS MSC-98
- USS MSC-99
- USS MSC-100
- USS MSC-101
- USS MSC-102
- USS MSC-103
- USS MSC-104
- USS MSC-105
- USS MSC-106
- USS MSC-107
- USS MSC-108
- USS MSC-109
- USS MSC-110
- USS MSC-111
- USS MSC-112
- USS MSC-113
- USS MSC-114
- USS MSC-115
- USS MSC-116
- USS MSC-117
- USS MSC-118
- USS MSC-119
- USS MSC-120
- USS MSC-123
- USS MSC-124
- USS MSC-125
- USS MSC-126
- USS MSC-127
- USS MSC-128
- USS MSC-129
- USS MSC-130
- USS MSC-131
- USS MSC-132
- USS MSC-133
- USS MSC-134
- USS MSC-135
- USS MSC-136
- USS MSC-137
- USS MSC-138
- USS MSC-139
- USS MSC-140
- USS MSC-141
- USS MSC-142
- USS MSC-143
- USS MSC-144
- USS MSC-145
- USS MSC-146
- USS MSC-147
- USS MSC-148
- USS MSC-149
- USS MSC-150
- USS MSC-151
- USS MSC-152
- USS MSC-153
- USS MSC-154
- USS MSC-155
- USS MSC-156
- USS MSC-157
- USS MSC-158
- USS MSC-159
- USS MSC-160
- USS MSC-161
- USS MSC-162
- USS MSC-163
- USS MSC-164
- USS MSC-165
- USS MSC-166
- USS MSC-167
- USS MSC-168
- USS MSC-169
- USS MSC-170
- USS MSC-171
- USS MSC-172
- USS MSC-173
- USS MSC-174
- USS MSC-175
- USS MSC-176
- USS MSC-177
- USS MSC-178
- USS MSC-179
- USS MSC-180
- USS MSC-181
- USS MSC-182
- USS MSC-183
- USS MSC-184
- USS MSC-185
- USS MSC-186
- USS MSC-187
- USS MSC-188
- USS MSC-189
- USS MSC-210
- USS MSC-211
- USS MSC-212
- USS MSC-213
- USS MSC-214
- USS MSC-215
- USS MSC-216
- USS MSC-217
- USS MSC-219
- USS MSC-220
- USS MSC-221
- USS MSC-222
- USS MSC-223
- USS MSC-224
- USS MSC-225
- USS MSC-226
- USS MSC-227
- USS MSC-228
- USS MSC-229
- USS MSC-230
- USS MSC-231
- USS MSC-232
- USS MSC-233
- USS MSC-234
- USS MSC-235
- USS MSC-236
- USS MSC-237
- USS MSC-238
- USS MSC-239
- USS MSC-240
- USS MSC-241
- USS MSC-242
- USS MSC-243
- USS MSC-244
- USS MSC-245
- USS MSC-246
- USS MSC-247
- USS MSC-248
- USS MSC-249
- USS MSC-250
- USS MSC-251
- USS MSC-252
- USS MSC-253
- USS MSC-254
- USS MSC-255
- USS MSC-256
- USS MSC-258
- USS MSC-259
- USS MSC-260
- USS MSC-261
- USS MSC-262
- USS MSC-263
- USS MSC-264
- USS MSC-265
- USS MSC-266
- USS MSC-267
- USS MSC-268
- USS MSC-269
- USS MSC-270
- USS MSC-271
- USS MSC-272
- USS MSC-273
- USS MSC-274
- USS MSC-275
- USS MSC-276
- USS MSC-277
- USS MSC-278
- USS MSC-279
- USS MSC-280
- USS MSC-281
- USS MSC-282
- USS MSC-283
- USS MSC-284
- USS MSC-285
- USS MSC-286
- USS MSC-287
- USS MSC-288
- USS MSC-291
- USS MSC-292
- USS MSC-293
- USS MSC-294
- USS MSC-295
- USS MSC-296
- USS MSC-297
- USS MSC-298
- USS MSC-299
- USS MSC-300
- USS MSC-301
- USS MSC-302
- USS MSC-303
- USS MSC-304
- USS MSC-305
- USS MSC-306
- USS MSC-307
- USS MSC-308
- USS MSC-309
- USS MSC-310
- USS MSC-311
- USS MSC-312
- USS MSC-313
- USS MSC-314
- USS MSC-315
- USS MSC-316
- USS MSC-317
- USS MSC-318
- USS MSC-319
- USS MSC-320
- USS MSC-321
- USS MSC-322
- USS MSC-323
- USS MSC-324
- USS MSC-325

== Minesweepers, coastal (Old) (MSC(O)) ==
All Ocean minesweepers (AMS) which were originally YMS-1 class minesweepers and still on hand on 7 February 1955 were redesignated as Minesweepers, coastal (Old) (MSC(O)). Hull numbers were not changed.

YMS-1 class

- USS Albatross (MSC(O)-1)
- USS Cardinal (MSC(O)-4)
- USS Condor (MSC(O)-5)
- USS Courser (MSC(O)-6)
- USS Crow (MSC(O)-7)
- USS Curlew (MSC(O)-8)
- USS Flicker (MSC(O)-9)
- USS Firecrest (MSC(O)-10)
- USS Flamingo (MSC(O)-11)
- USS Goldfinch (MSC(O)-12)
- USS Grackle (MSC(O)-13)
- USS Grosbeak (MSC(O)-14)
- USS Grouse (MSC(O)-15), grounded 12 September 1963, CTL
- USS Hawk (MSC(O)-17)
- USS Heron (MSC(O)-18)
- USS Hornbill (MSC(O)-19)
- USS Hummer (MSC(O)-20)
- USS Jackdaw (MSC(O)-21)
- USS Kite (MSC(O)-22)
- USS Lark (MSC(O)-23)
- USS Linnet (MSC(O)-24)
- USS Mockingbird (MSC(O)-27)
- USS Osprey (MSC(O)-28)
- USS Ostrich (MSC(O)-29)
- USS Pelican (MSC(O)-32)
- USS Plover (MSC(O)-33)
- USS Swallow (MSC(O)-36)
- USS Swan (MSC(O)-37)
- USS Verdin (MSC(O)-38)
- USS Chatterer (MSC(O)-40)
- USS Barbet (MSC(O)-41)
- USS Brambling (MSC(O)-42)
- USS Brant (MSC(O)-43)
- USS Courlan (MSC(O)-44)
- USS Crossbill (MSC(O)-45)
- USS Egret (MSC(O)-46)
- USS Lapwing (MSC(O)-48)
- USS Lorikeet (MSC(O)-49)
- USS Nightingale (MSC(O)-50)
- USS Reedbird (MSC(O)-51)
- USS Rhea (MSC(O)-52)
- USS Robin (MSC(O)-53)
- USS Ruff (MSC(O)-54)
- USS Seagull (MSC(O)-55)
- USS Turkey (MSC(O)-56)
- USS Redpoll (MSC(O)-57)
- USS Siskin (MSC(O)-58)

== Minesweepers, steel hulled (MSF) ==
All MSF vessels were originally classed as Minesweepers (AM) prior to 7 February 1955. Hull numbers were not changed.

Raven class

- USS Raven (MSF-55)

Auk class

- USS Auk (MSF-57)
- USS Broadbill (MSF-58)
- USS Chickadee (MSF-59)
- USS Nuthatch (MSF-60)
- USS Pheasant (MSF-61)
- USS Starling (MSF-64)
- USS Heed (MSF-100)
- USS Herald (MSF-101)
- USS Motive (MSF-102)
- USS Oracle (MSF-103)
- USS Pilot (MSF-104)
- USS Pioneer (MSF-105)
- USS Revenge (MSF-110)
- USS Sage (MSF-111)
- USS Seer (MSF-112), later MMC-5
- USS Staff (MSF-114)
- USS Speed (MSF-116)
- USS Strive (MSF-117), later MMC-1
- USS Steady (MSF-118)
- USS Sustain (MSF-119), later MMC-2
- USS Sway (MSF-120)
- USS Token (MSF-126)
- USS Tumult (MSF-127)
- USS Velocity (MSF-128)
- USS Zeal (MSF-131)
- USS Champion (MSF-314)
- USS Chief (MSF-315)
- USS Competent (MSF-316)
- USS Defense (MSF-317)
- USS Devastator (MSF-318)
- USS Gladiator (MSF-319)
- USS Impeccable (MSF-320)
- USS Overseer (MSF-321)
- USS Spear (MSF-322)
- USS Triumph (MSF-323), later MMC-3
- USS Vigilance (MSF-324)
- USS Ardent (MSF-340)
- USS Dextrous (MSF-341)
- USS Murrelet (MSF-372)
- USS Peregrine (MSF-373), later AG-176
- USS Pigeon (MSF-374)
- USS Pochard (MSF-375)
- USS Ptarmigan (MSF-376)
- USS Quail (MSF-377)
- USS Redstart (MSF-378)
- USS Roselle (MSF-379)
- USS Ruddy (MSF-380)
- USS Scoter (MSF-381)
- USS Shoveler (MSF-382)
- USS Surfbird (MSF-383)
- USS Sprig (MSF-384)
- USS Tanager (MSF-385)
- USS Tercel (MSF-386)
- USS Toucan (MSF-387)
- USS Towhee (MSF-388)
- USS Waxwing (MSF-389)
- USS Wheatear (MSF-390)

Admirable class

- USS Admirable (MSF-136)
- USS Adopt (MSF-137)
- USS Advocate (MSF-138)
- USS Agent (MSF-139)
- USS Alarm (MSF-140)
- USS Alchemy (MSF-141)
- USS Apex (MSF-142)
- USS Arcade (MSF-143)
- USS Arch (MSF-144)
- USS Armada (MSF-145)
- USS Aspire (MSF-146)
- USS Assail (MSF-147)
- USS Astute (MSF-148)
- USS Augury (MSF-149)
- USS Barrier (MSF-150)
- USS Bombard (MSF-151)
- USS Bond (MSF-152)
- USS Candid (MSF-154)
- USS Capable (MSF-155)
- USS Captivate (MSF-156)
- USS Caravan (MSF-157)
- USS Caution (MSF-158)
- USS Change (MSF-159)
- USS Clamour (MSF-160)
- USS Climax (MSF-161)
- USS Compel (MSF-162)
- USS Concise (MSF-163)
- USS Control (MSF-164)
- USS Counsel (MSF-165)
- USS Crag (MSF-214)
- USS Cruise (MSF-215)
- USS Deft (MSF-216)
- USS Density (MSF-218)
- USS Design (MSF-219)
- USS Device (MSF-220)
- USS Diploma (MSF-221)
- USS Disdain (MSF-222)
- USS Dour (MSF-223)
- USS Eager (MSF-224)
- USS Execute (MSF-232)
- USS Facility (MSF-233)
- USS Fancy (MSF-234)
- USS Garland (MSF-238)
- USS Gayety (MSF-239)
- USS Hazard (MSF-240)
- USS Hilarity (MSF-241)
- USS Inaugural (MSF-242)
- USS Incredible (MSF-249)
- USS Instill (MSF-252)
- USS Intrigue (MSF-253)
- USS Invade (MSF-254)
- USS Jubilant (MSF-255)
- USS Knave (MSF-256)
- USS Mainstay (MSF-261)
- USS Marvel (MSF-262)
- USS Method (MSF-264)
- USS Mirth (MSF-265)
- USS Nucleus (MSF-268)
- USS Opponent (MSF-269)
- USS Penetrate (MSF-271)
- USS Prowess (MSF-280), later IX-305
- USS Rampart (MSF-282)
- USS Ransom (MSF-283)
- USS Rebel (MSF-284)
- USS Recruit (MSF-285)
- USS Reign (MSF-288)
- USS Report (MSF-289), later to US Army intelligence as USAS Report (AGP-289)
- USS Salute (MSF-294)
- USS Scrimmage (MSF-297)
- USS Scuffle (MSF-298)
- USS Sentry (MSF-299)
- USS Serene (MSF-300)
- USS Shelter (MSF-301)
- USS Signet (MSF-302)
- USS Skirmish (MSF-303)
- USS Scurry (MSF-304)
- USS Specter (MSF-306)
- USS Staunch (MSF-307)
- USS Strategy (MSF-308)
- USS Strength (MSF-309)
- USS Success (MSF-310)
- USS Superior (MSF-311)
- USS Dipper (MSF-357)
- USS Dotterel (MSF-358)
- USS Driver (MSF-360)
- USS Gadwall (MSF-362)
- USS Graylag (MSF-364)
- USS Harlequin (MSF-365)

== Inshore minesweepers (MSI) ==
- USS Cove (MSI-1)
- USS Cape (MSI-2)
- USS MSI-3
- USS MSI-4
- USS MSI-5
- USS MSI-6
- USS MSI-7
- USS MSI-8
- USS MSI-9
- USS MSI-10
- USS MSI-11
- USS MSI-12
- USS MSI-13
- USS MSI-14
- USS MSI-15
- USS MSI-16
- USS MSI-17
- USS MSI-18
- USS MSI-19
- USS MSI-20
- USS MSI-21
- USS MSI-22
- USS MSI-23
- USS MSI-24
- USS MSI-25
- USS MSI-26
- USS MSI-27
- USS MSI-28
- USS MSI-29
- USS MSI-30
- USS MSI-31
- USS MSI-32
- USS MSI-33
- USS MSI-34
- USS MSI-35
- USS MSI-36
- USS MSI-37
- USS MSI-38
- USS MSI-39
- USS MSI-40
- USS MSI-41
- USS MSI-42
- USS MSI-43
- USS MSI-44
- USS MSI-45
- USS MSI-46
- USS MSI-47
- USS MSI-48
- USS MSI-49
- USS MSI-50
- USS MSI-51
- USS MSI-52
- USS MSI-53
- USS MSI-54
- USS MSI-55
- USS MSI-56
- USS MSI-57
- USS MSI-58
- USS MSI-59
- USS MSI-60
- USS MSI-61
- USS MSI-62
- USS MSI-63
- USS MSI-64
- USS MSI-65
- USS MSI-66
- USS MSI-67
- USS MSI-68
- USS MSI-69
- USS MSI-70
- USS MSI-71
- USS MSI-72
- USS MSI-73
- USS MSI-74
- USS MSI-75
- USS MSI-76
- USS MSI-77
- USS MSI-78
- USS MSI-79
- USS MSI-80
- USS MSI-81
- USS MSI-82
- USS MSI-83
- USS MSI-84
- USS MSI-85
- USS MSI-86
- USS MSI-87
- USS MSI-88
- USS MSI-89
- USS MSI-90
- USS MSI-91
- USS MSI-92
- USS MSI-93
- USS MSI-94
- USS MSI-95
- USS MSI-96
- USS MSI-97
- USS MSI-98
- USS MSI-99
- USS MSI-100
- USS MSI-101

== Minesweepers, ocean (MSO) ==
All MSO vessels were originally classed as Minesweepers (AM) prior to 7 February 1955. Hull numbers were not changed.

Agile or Aggressive class

Ships of this class are variously called Agile or Aggressive class depending on source. Some four ships are also sometimes named as a part of a distinct Dash subclass.

- USS Agile (MSO-421)
- USS Aggressive (MSO-422)
- USS Avenge (MSO-423)
- USS Bold (MSO-424)
- USS Bulwark (MSO-425)
- USS Conflict (MSO-426)
- USS Constant (MSO-427)
- USS Dash (MSO-428)
- USS Detector (MSO-429)
- USS Direct (MSO-430)
- USS Dominant (MSO-431)
- USS Dynamic (MSO-432)
- USS Engage (MSO-433), Operation Dominic nuclear test participant
- USS Embattle (MSO-434)
- USS Endurance (MSO-435)
- USS Energy (MSO-436)
- USS Enhance (MSO-437)
- USS Esteem (MSO-438)
- USS Excel (MSO-439)
- USS Exploit (MSO-440)
- USS Exultant (MSO-441)
- USS Fearless (MSO-442)
- USS Fidelity (MSO-443)
- USS Firm (MSO-444)
- USS Force (MSO-445), lost by fire off Guam, 24 April 1973, no deaths
- USS Fortify (MSO-446), Operation Dominic participant
- USS Guide (MSO-447)
- USS Illusive (MSO-448)
- USS Impervious (MSO-449), Operation Dominic participant
- MSO-450 (built for France as the Berneval (M 613))
- MSO-451 (built for France as the Bir Hakeim (M 614))
- MSO-452 (built for France as the Garigliano (M 617))
- MSO-453 (built for France as the Alençon (M 612))
- MSO-454 (built for France as the Dompaire (M 616))
- USS Implicit (MSO-455)
- USS Inflict (MSO-456), Operation Dominic participant
- USS Loyalty (MSO-457), Operation Dominic participant
- USS Lucid (MSO-458)
- USS Nimble (MSO-459)
- USS Notable (MSO-460)
- USS Observer (MSO-461)
- USS Pinnacle (MSO-462)
- USS Pivot (MSO-463)
- USS Pluck (MSO-464)
- USS Prestige (MSO-465)
- USS Prime (MSO-466)
- USS Reaper (MSO-467)
- USS Rival (MSO-468)
- USS Sagacity (MSO-469)
- USS Salute (MSO-470)
- USS Skill (MSO-471)
- USS Valor (MSO-472)
- USS Vigor (MSO-473)
- USS Vital (MSO-474)
- MSO-475 (built for France as the My Tho (M 618))
- MSO-476 (built for France as the Can Tho (M 615))
- MSO-477 (built for France as the Vinh Long (M 619))
- MSO-478 (built for Portugal as the São Jorge (M 415))
- MSO-479 (built for Portugal as the Pico (M 416))
- MSO-480 (built for the Netherlands as the Onversaagd (M 884))
- MSO-481 (built for the Netherlands as the Onbevreesd (M 885))
- MSO-482 (built for the Netherlands as the Onvervaard (M 888))
- MSO-483 (built for the Netherlands as the Onverschrokken (M 886))
- MSO-484 (built for the Netherlands as the Onvermoeid (M 887))
- MSO-485 (built for the Netherlands as the Onverdroten (M 889))
- MSO-486 (built for Portugal as the Graciosa (M 417))
- MSO-487 (built for Portugal as the Corvo (M 418))
- USS Conquest (MSO-488)
- USS Gallant (MSO-489)
- USS Leader (MSO-490)
- USS Persistent (MSO-491)
- USS Pledge (MSO-492)
- USS Stalwart (MSO-493), burned, capsized and sank 25 June 1966, San Juan PR, no deaths, CTL
- USS Sturdy (MSO-494)
- USS Swerve (MSO-495)
- USS Venture (MSO-496)
- MSO-497 (cancelled)
- MSO-498 (built for Norway as the Lågen (M 950))
- MSO-499 (built for Norway as the Namsen (M 951))
- MSO-500 (built for France as the Berlaimont (M 620))
- MSO-501 (built for France as the Origny (M 621))
- MSO-502 (built for France as the Autun (M 622))
- MSO-503 (built for Belgium as the Artevelde (M 907))
- MSO-504 (built for Belgium as the Artevelde (M 906))
- MSO-505 (built for France as the Baccarat (M 623))
- MSO-506 (built for Italy as the Storione (M 5431))
- MSO-507 (built for Italy as the Salmone (M 5430))
- MSO-512 (built for France as the Narvik (M 609))
- MSO-513 (built for France as the Ouistreham (M 610))
- MSO-514 (built for France as the Colmar (M 610))
- MSO-515 (built for Belgium as the Georges Truffaut (M 908))
- MSO-516 (built for Belgium as the F. Bovesse (M 909))
- MSO-517 (built for Italy as the Sgombro (M 5432))
- MSO-518 (built for Italy as the Squalo (M 5433))

Acme class

- USS Acme (MSO-508)
- USS Adroit (MSO-509)
- USS Advance (MSO-510)
- USS Affray (MSO-511)

Ability class

- USS Ability (MSO-519)
- USS Alacrity (MSO-520), later AG-520
- USS Assurance (MSO-521), later AG-521
- MSO-522 (built for Belgium as the Van Haverbeke (M 902))
- MSO-523 to MSO-538 were planned but never built.

== Minesweepers (Special device) (MSS) ==
Note that the official classification of these as devices rather than ships accounts for these ships absence of listings among the Navy's ships while designated MSS-1 and MSS-2.

- MSS-1, ex-Liberty ship Harry L. Glucksman
- Washtenaw County (MSS-2), ex-LST-1166

== Submarine minelayers (SM) ==
- USS Argonaut (SM-1), later APS-1, sunk by Japanese destroyers off Rabaul on 10 January 1943

== District auxiliary, miscellaneous (YAG) ==
Three Liberty ships were converted into experimental minesweepers.

- Floyd W. Spencer (YAG-36)
- John L. Sullivan (YAG-37)
- Edward Kavanagh (YAG-38)

Another Liberty ship, the SS R. Ney McNeely, was also converted into an experimental minesweeper, but was returned to the reserve fleet without having a YAG number assigned.

== Degaussing craft (YDG) ==
- YDG-1
- YDG-2
- YDG-3
- YDG-4, lost off New Caledonia, 1 October 1943
- YDG-5
- YDG-6, ex-YMS-344
- YDG-7, ex-YMS-480
- YDG-8, ex-PCE-876, later ADG-8
- YDG-9, ex-PCE-879, later ADG-9
- YDG-10, ex-PCE-883, later ADG-10
- YDG-11, ex-PCE-919, AM-359, later ADG-11

== Motor mineplanters (YMP) ==
Mineplanters were used to plant and maintain controlled mines for harbor defense; since the US Army had the primary responsibility for these minefields it is likely that the YMP hull designation was seldom used.

== Auxiliary motor mine sweepers (YMS) ==
YMS-1 class

All Auxiliary Motor Mine Sweeper (YMS) ships to date are YMS-1 class, which itself has multiple subclasses.

All 1945 transfers to the Soviet Union (USSR) occurred under Project Hula.

YMS-1 subclass

- USS YMS-1
- USS YMS-2
- USS YMS-3
- USS YMS-4
- USS YMS-5
- USS YMS-6
- USS YMS-7
- USS YMS-8
- USS YMS-9
- USS YMS-10
- USS YMS-11
- USS YMS-12
- USS YMS-13
- USS YMS-14, sunk in collision, Boston Harbor, 11 Jan 1945
- USS YMS-15
- USS YMS-16
- USS YMS-17
- USS YMS-18
- USS YMS-19, sunk by mine, Angaur, Palau Islands, 24 September 1944
- USS YMS-20
- USS YMS-21, sunk by mine, Toulon, France, 1 September 1944
- USS YMS-22
- USS YMS-23
- USS YMS-24, sunk by mine, St. Tropez, France, 16 August 1944
- USS YMS-25
- USS YMS-26
- USS YMS-27
- USS YMS-28
- USS YMS-29
- USS YMS-30, sunk by mine, Anzio, Italy, 25 January 1944
- USS YMS-31
- USS YMS-32
- USS YMS-33, to USSR 17 August 1945
- USS YMS-34
- USS YMS-35
- USS YMS-36
- USS YMS-37
- USS YMS-38, to USSR 19 July 1945
- USS YMS-39, sunk by mine, Balikpapan, Borneo, 26 June 1945
- USS YMS-40
- USS YMS-41
- USS YMS-42, to USSR 19 July 1945
- USS YMS-43
- USS YMS-44
- USS YMS-45, later AMS-41
- USS YMS-46
- USS YMS-47
- USS YMS-48, sunk by Japanese artillery on Corregidor 14 February 1945
- USS YMS-49
- USS YMS-50, sunk by mine, Balikpapan, Borneo, 18 June 1945
- USS YMS-51
- USS YMS-52
- USS YMS-53
- USS YMS-54
- USS YMS-55
- USS YMS-56
- USS YMS-57
- USS YMS-58
- USS YMS-59, to USSR 6 June 1945
- USS YMS-60
- USS YMS-61
- USS YMS-62
- USS YMS-63
- USS YMS-64
- USS YMS-65
- USS YMS-66
- USS YMS-67
- USS YMS-68
- USS YMS-69
- USS YMS-70, lost in storm off Leyte, Philippines, 17 October 1944
- USS YMS-71, sunk by a mine off Borneo, 3 April 1945
- USS YMS-72
- USS YMS-73
- USS YMS-74
- USS YMS-75, to USSR 19 July 1945
- USS YMS-76
- USS YMS-77
- USS YMS-78
- USS YMS-79
- USS YMS-80, later AMS-1
- USS YMS-81
- USS YMS-82
- USS YMS-83
- USS YMS-84, sunk by mine, Balikpapan, Borneo, 9 July 1945
- USS YMS-85, to USSR 17 August 1945
- USS YMS-86
- USS YMS-87
- USS YMS-88, to USSR 27 August 1945
- USS YMS-89
- USS YMS-90
- USS YMS-91
- USS YMS-91
- USS YMS-93
- USS YMS-94
- USS YMS-95
- USS YMS-96
- USS YMS-97
- USS YMS-98, lost in Typhoon Ida 16 September 1945
- USS YMS-99
- USS YMS-100, to USSR 17 August 1945
- USS YMS-101
- USS YMS-102
- USS YMS-103, damaged by mine Okinawa, 8 April 1945, CTL, 5 killed
- USS YMS-104
- USS YMS-105
- USS YMS-106
- USS YMS-107
- USS YMS-108
- USS YMS-109, later AMS-42
- USS YMS-110
- USS YMS-111
- USS YMS-112
- USS YMS-113, later AMS-43
- USS YMS-114, later AMS-44
- USS YMS-115
- USS YMS-116
- USS YMS-117
- USS YMS-118
- USS YMS-119
- USS YMS-120, later AMS-45
- USS YMS-121
- USS YMS-122
- USS YMS-123
- USS YMS-124
- USS YMS-125
- USS YMS-126
- USS YMS-127, grounded in a storm Tanaga Island Aleutians 10 January 1944, CTL
- USS YMS-128
- USS YMS-129
- USS YMS-130
- USS YMS-131
- USS YMS-132
- USS YMS-133, foundered 20 February 1943 off Coos Bay, OR
- USS YMS-134

YMS-135 subclass

- USS YMS-135, to USSR 27 August 1945
- USS YMS-136, later AMS-46
- USS YMS-137, to UK
- USS YMS-138
- USS YMS-139, to USSR 19 July 1945
- USS YMS-140
- USS YMS-141, to UK
- USS YMS-142, to UK
- USS YMS-143, to USSR 17 May 1945
- USS YMS-144, to USSR 17 May 1945
- USS YMS-145, to USSR 22 May 1945
- USS YMS-146, lost in Typhoon Louise, Okinawa, 9 October 1945
- USS YMS-147
- USS YMS-148, to UK
- USS YMS-149, to UK
- USS YMS-150, to UK
- USS YMS-151
- USS YMS-152, to UK
- USS YMS-153, to UK
- USS YMS-154, to UK
- USS YMS-155, to UK
- USS YMS-156, to UK
- USS YMS-157, to UK
- USS YMS-158
- USS YMS-159
- USS YMS-160
- USS YMS-161, to UK
- USS YMS-162, to UK
- USS YMS-163
- USS YMS-164, later AMS-2
- USS YMS-165
- USS YMS-166
- USS YMS-167, to UK
- USS YMS-168, to UK
- USS YMS-169
- USS YMS-170, later AMS-3
- USS YMS-171, to UK
- USS YMS-172, to UK
- USS YMS-173, to UK
- USS YMS-174, to UK
- USS YMS-175, to UK
- USS YMS-176
- USS YMS-177
- USS YMS-178, to USSR 19 July 1945
- USS YMS-179, later AMS-4
- USS YMS-180, to USSR 27 August 1945
- USS YMS-181, to UK
- USS YMS-182, to UK
- USS YMS-183
- USS YMS-184, to USSR 19 July 1945
- USS YMS-185, to UK
- USS YMS-186, to UK
- USS YMS-187, to UK
- USS YMS-188, to UK
- USS YMS-189, to UK
- USS YMS-190, to UK
- USS YMS-191, to UK
- USS YMS-192, later AMS-5
- USS YMS-193, later AMS-47
- USS YMS-194, to UK
- USS YMS-195
- USS YMS-196
- USS YMS-197
- USS YMS-198
- USS YMS-199
- USS YMS-200
- USS YMS-201, later AMS-6
- USS YMS-202, to UK
- USS YMS-203, to UK
- USS YMS-204, to UK
- USS YMS-205, to UK
- USS YMS-206, to UK
- USS YMS-207
- USS YMS-208
- USS YMS-209, to UK
- USS YMS-210, to UK
- USS YMS-211, to UK
- USS YMS-212, to UK
- USS YMS-213, to UK
- USS YMS-214, to UK
- USS YMS-215, later AMS-7
- USS YMS-216, to USSR 19 July 1945
- USS YMS-217, to UK
- USS YMS-218, later AMS-8
- USS YMS-219, later AMS-9
- USS YMS-220
- USS YMS-221, to UK
- USS YMS-222
- USS YMS-223, to UK
- USS YMS-224
- USS YMS-225, to UK
- USS YMS-226
- USS YMS-227
- USS YMS-228
- USS YMS-229, to UK
- USS YMS-230, to UK
- USS YMS-231, later AMS-10
- USS YMS-232, to UK
- USS YMS-233, to UK
- USS YMS-234, to UK
- USS YMS-235
- USS YMS-236, to UK
- USS YMS-237, to USSR 19 July 1945
- USS YMS-238, later AMS-11
- USS YMS-239
- USS YMS-240, to UK
- USS YMS-241, to USSR 19 July 1945
- USS YMS-242, later AGS-12, AGSC-12, AMCU-12
- USS YMS-243
- USS YMS-244, to UK
- USS YMS-245
- USS YMS-246, to UK
- USS YMS-247
- USS YMS-248
- USS YMS-249
- USS YMS-250
- USS YMS-251
- USS YMS-252, to UK
- USS YMS-253, to UK
- USS YMS-254, to UK
- USS YMS-255, to UK
- USS YMS-256, to UK
- USS YMS-257, to UK
- USS YMS-258, to UK
- USS YMS-259
- USS YMS-260, to USSR 2 August 1945
- USS YMS-261, to UK
- USS YMS-262, later AGS-13 as James M. Gilliss, Operation Crossroads nuclear test participant, AGSC-13, AMCU-13, MHC-13
- USS YMS-263, later AGS-14, AGSC-14
- USS YMS-264
- USS YMS-265
- USS YMS-266, to USSR 17 August 1945
- USS YMS-267
- USS YMS-268, later AMS-48
- USS YMS-269
- USS YMS-270
- USS YMS-271, later AMS-49
- USS YMS-272, to USSR 19 July 1945
- USS YMS-273, to USSR 19 July 1945
- USS YMS-274
- USS YMS-275, lost in Typhoon Louise, Okinawa, 9 October 1945
- USS YMS-276
- USS YMS-277, to UK
- USS YMS-278, to UK
- USS YMS-279, to UK
- USS YMS-280, to UK
- USS YMS-281
- USS YMS-282, to UK
- USS YMS-283
- USS YMS-284, to UK
- USS YMS-285, to USSR 27 August 1945
- USS YMS-286
- USS YMS-287, to USSR 3 September 1945
- USS YMS-288, to USSR 17 August 1945
- USS YMS-289
- USS YMS-290, later AMS-50
- USS YMS-291, later AMS-51
- USS YMS-292
- USS YMS-293
- USS YMS-294, later AMS-57
- USS YMS-295, to USSR 19 July 1945
- USS YMS-296
- USS YMS-297
- USS YMS-298
- USS YMS-299, later AMS-52
- USS YMS-300
- USS YMS-301, to USSR 17 August 1945
- USS YMS-302
- USS YMS-303
- USS YMS-304, sunk by mine Normandy, 30 July 1944, 8 killed
- USS YMS-305
- USS YMS-306, later AMS-12
- USS YMS-307
- USS YMS-308
- USS YMS-309
- USS YMS-310
- USS YMS-311, later AMS-53
- USS YMS-312, later AMS-13
- USS YMS-313
- USS YMS-314
- USS YMS-315
- USS YMS-316
- USS YMS-317, later AMS-14
- USS YMS-318
- USS YMS-319
- USS YMS-320
- USS YMS-321, later AMS-15
- USS YMS-322
- USS YMS-323
- USS YMS-324, later AMS-16, AMCU-46
- USS YMS-325
- USS YMS-326
- USS YMS-327, later AMS-54
- USS YMS-328, later private yacht
- USS YMS-329
- USS YMS-330
- USS YMS-331
- USS YMS-332, to USSR 27 August 1945
- USS YMS-333
- USS YMS-334
- USS YMS-335
- USS YMS-336
- USS YMS-337
- USS YMS-338
- USS YMS-339
- USS YMS-340
- USS YMS-341, lost in Typhoon Ida, 16 September 1945
- USS YMS-342
- USS YMS-343
- USS YMS-344, later YDG-6
- USS YMS-345
- USS YMS-346
- USS YMS-347
- USS YMS-348
- USS YMS-349
- USS YMS-350, sunk by mine, Normandy, 2 July 1944
- USS YMS-351
- USS YMS-352
- USS YMS-353
- USS YMS-354, Operation Crossroads nuclear test participant
- USS YMS-355
- USS YMS-356
- USS YMS-357
- USS YMS-358, Operation Crossroads participant
- USS YMS-359
- USS YMS-360
- USS YMS-361
- USS YMS-362, later AMS-17
- USS YMS-363
- USS YMS-364
- USS YMS-365, sunk by mine Balikpapan, Borneo, 26 June 1945, no deaths
- USS YMS-366
- USS YMS-367
- USS YMS-368
- USS YMS-369, later AMS-18
- USS YMS-370
- USS YMS-371, later AMS-19
- USS YMS-372, later AMS-20
- USS YMS-373, later AMS-21
- USS YMS-374, later AMS-22
- USS YMS-375
- USS YMS-376, later AMS-23
- USS YMS-377
- USS YMS-378, damaged by mine, Normandy, 30 July 1944, CTL
- USS YMS-379
- USS YMS-380
- USS YMS-381
- USS YMS-382
- USS YMS-383, lost in Typhoon Louise, Okinawa, 9 October 1945
- USS YMS-384
- USS YMS-385, sunk by mine, Ulithi, 1 October 1944
- USS YMS-386
- USS YMS-387
- USS YMS-388
- USS YMS-389
- USS YMS-390
- USS YMS-391
- USS YMS-392
- USS YMS-393
- USS YMS-394
- USS YMS-395, later AMS-24
- USS YMS-396
- USS YMS-397
- USS YMS-398
- USS YMS-399
- USS YMS-400, later AMS-25
- USS YMS-401
- USS YMS-402, later AMS-55
- USS YMS-403
- USS YMS-404
- USS YMS-405
- USS YMS-406
- USS YMS-407
- USS YMS-408
- USS YMS-409, lost 12 Sep 1944 in the 1944 Great Atlantic Hurricane, all 33 crew died
- USS YMS-410
- USS YMS-411
- USS YMS-412
- USS YMS-413, Operation Crossroads participant
- USS YMS-414
- USS YMS-415, later AMS-40
- USS YMS-416
- USS YMS-417, later AMS-26, AMCU-47
- USS YMS-418
- USS YMS-419, later AMS-27
- USS YMS-420
- USS YMS-421, lost in Typhoon Ida, 15 September 1945
- USS YMS-422, later AMS-28
- USS YMS-423
- USS YMS-424, grounded by Typhoon Louise, Okinawa, 9 October 1945, CTL
- USS YMS-425, later AMS-58
- USS YMS-426
- USS YMS-427
- USS YMS-428, to USSR 17 May 1945
- USS YMS-429
- USS YMS-430, later AMS-29
- USS YMS-431
- USS YMS-432
- USS YMS-433
- USS YMS-434, later AMS-30
- USS YMS-435, to USSR 17 May 1945
- USS YMS-436
- USS YMS-437, later AMS-31
- USS YMS-438
- USS YMS-439
- USS YMS-440
- USS YMS-441, later AMS-32
- USS YMS-442, later AMS-33
- USS YMS-443, later AMS-34, AMCU-48
- USS YMS-444, later AMS-56
- USS YMS-445
- USS YMS-480, later YDG-7
- USS YMS-481, sunk by shore batteries off Tarakan, Borneo, 2 May 1945

YMS-446 subclass

- USS YMS-446, ex-PCS-1393, later AMS-35, AMCU-49
- USS YMS-447, ex-PCS-1394
- USS YMS-448, ex-PCS-1395
- USS YMS-449, ex-PCS-1398
- USS YMS-450, ex-PCS-1399
- USS YMS-451, ex-PCS-1400
- USS YMS-452, ex-PCS-1401
- USS YMS-453, ex-PCS-1406
- USS YMS-454, ex-PCS-1407, grounded by Typhoon Louise, Okinawa, 9 October 1945, CTL
- USS YMS-455, ex-PCS-1408
- USS YMS-456, ex-PCS-1409
- USS YMS-457, ex-PCS-1410
- USS YMS-458, ex-PCS-1411
- USS YMS-459, ex-PCS-1412
- USS YMS-460, ex-PCS-1415
- USS YMS-461, ex-PCS-1416, later AMS-36
- USS YMS-462, ex-PC-1427, PCS-1427
- USS YMS-463, ex-PCS-1428, Operation Crossroads participant
- USS YMS-464, ex-PCS-1432
- USS YMS-465, ex-PCS-1433
- USS YMS-466, ex-PCS-1434
- USS YMS-467, ex-PCS-1435
- USS YMS-468, ex-PCS-1436
- USS YMS-469, ex-PCS-1437
- USS YMS-470, ex-PCS-1438, later AMS-37
- USS YMS-471, ex-PCS-1439, later AMS-38
- USS YMS-472, ex-PCS-1440, lost in Typhoon Ida, 16 September 1945
- USS YMS-473, ex-PCS-1443
- USS YMS-474, ex-PCS-1444
- USS YMS-475, ex-PCS-1447
- USS YMS-476, ex-PCS-1448
- USS YMS-477, ex-PCS-1453
- USS YMS-478, ex-PCS-1454, broached and capsized by Typhoon Ida, 16 September 1945 at Wakanoura Wan, Japan, CTL
- USS YMS-479, ex-PCS-1456, later AMS-39, AMCU-50

YMS-482 through YMS-500 were planned but cancelled.

== Littoral Combat Ships (LCS) ==
The Littoral Combat Ships can carry Mine Warfare Modules which operate unmanned vehicles of various types for mine clearance operations.

== Unclassified civilian minesweepers ==
After the end of World War II three war-damaged civilian ships with skeleton Navy crews and automated engineering spaces were used as minesweepers to trigger still-active US pressure mines in Japanese waters. There ships were not Navy ships and were to be disposed and therefore were not assigned Navy hull classifications. Reportedly no active mines were found.

- SS Pratt Victory
- SS Joseph Holt
- SS Marathon

== See also ==
- Commander Mine Squadron SEVEN
- Degaussing
- Minelaying
- Minesweeping
- Mine planting
- List of current ships of the United States Navy
- List of United States Navy ships
- List of United States Navy losses in World War II § Mine warfare ships - abbreviated list
- List of U.S. Navy ships sunk or damaged in action during World War II § Mine warfare vessels - detailed list
- List of ships of the United States Army § Mine Planters
- Project Hula
