= USS YMS-107 =

Minesweeper of the United States Navy

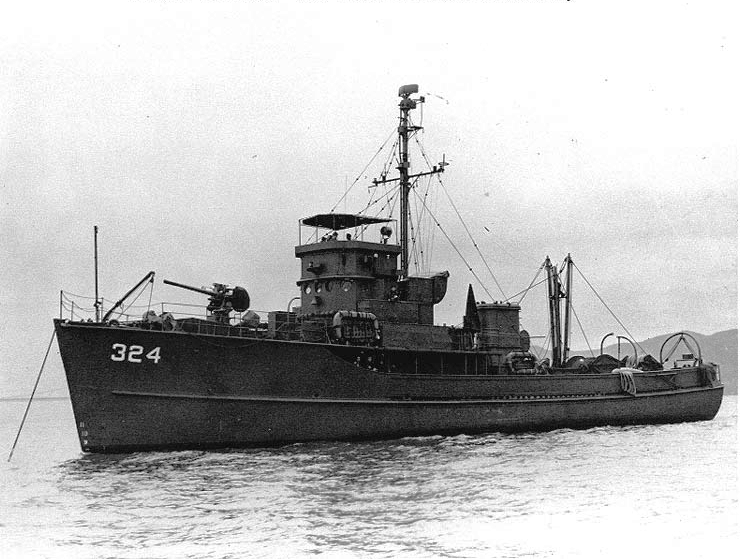
- A YMS-1-class minesweeper

History

United States
- Name: YMS-107
- Builder: Burger Boat Co. (Manitowoc, Wisconsin, U.S.A.)
- Laid down: 13 May 1941
- Launched: 28 March 1942
- Commissioned: 3 Aug 1942
- Decommissioned: 1945
- Stricken: 20 March 1946
- Fate: Transferred to the War Assets Administration in March 1948

General characteristics
- Class & type: YMS-1-class minesweeper
- Displacement: 320 tons
- Length: 136 ft (41 m)
- Beam: 24 ft 6 in (7.47 m)
- Draft: 6 ft 1 in (1.85 m)
- Propulsion: 2 × 880 bhp (660 kW) General Motors 8-268A diesel engines, Snow and Knobstedt single reduction gear, two shafts.
- Speed: 13 knots (24 km/h; 15 mph)
- Complement: 33 officers and men
- Armament: 1 × 3 in (76 mm) dual-purpose gun; 2 × 20 mm guns; 2 × depth charge tracks and two depth charge projectors
- Aircraft carried: none

YMS-107 was a wooden hulled yard minesweeper of the United States Navy built by the Burger Boat Co. in Manitowoc, Wisconsin. Her construction was completed on 3 August 1942, and she was commissioned the same day.

In September 1945, there was a collision between YMS-107 and the United States Army vessel FS-369. YMS-107 was removed from the Naval Register on 20 March 1946, and was transferred to the War Assets Administration in March 1948.
