= USS Flicker (AMS-9) =

Minesweeper of the United States Navy

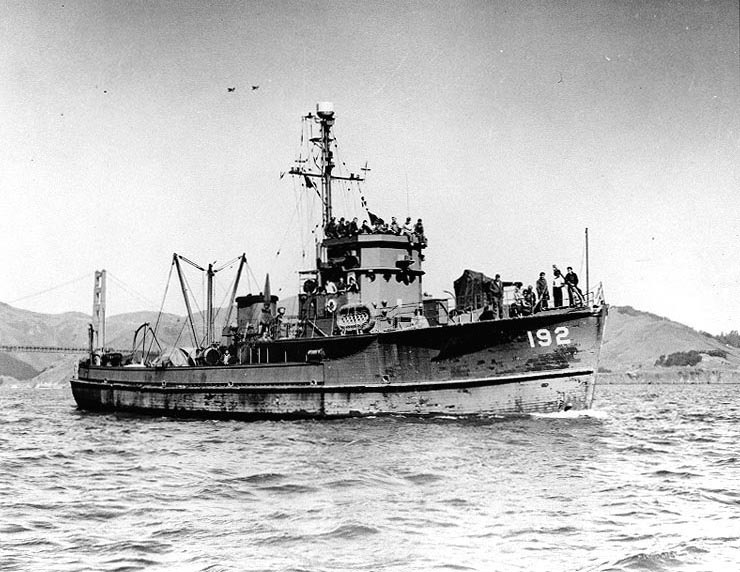
- A YMS-1-class minesweeper

History

United States
- Laid down: 23 October 1942
- Launched: 23 January 1943
- Commissioned: 17 February 1947
- Decommissioned: September/October 1953
- Stricken: 1 January 1960
- Fate: Fate unknown

General characteristics
- Displacement: 270 tons
- Length: 136 ft (41 m)
- Beam: 24 ft 6 in (7.47 m)
- Draught: 8 ft (2.4 m)
- Propulsion: two General Motors diesel engines, two shafts
- Speed: 15 kts
- Complement: 32
- Armament: one single 3 in (76 mm) gun mount, two 20 mm, two dcp

USS Flicker (AMS-9/YMS-219) was a YMS-1-class minesweeper of the YMS-135 subclass acquired by the U.S. Navy for clearing coastal minefields during World War II.

Flicker was laid down on 23 October 1942 by the J. N. Martinac Shipbuilding Co., Tacoma, Washington; and launched, on 23 January 1943; completed, 20 July 1943; commissioned as USS YMS-219; named Flicker and reclassified as a motor minesweeper, AMS-9, 17 February 1947; she was subsequently Reclassified as a coastal minesweeper (Old), MSC(O)-9, 7 February 1955.

Flicker was decommissioned in September/October 1953 at Naval Station, Astoria, Oregon. She was struck from the Naval Register, 1 January 1960. Her fate is unknown.
