= USS Plover (AMS-33) =

Minesweeper of the United States Navy

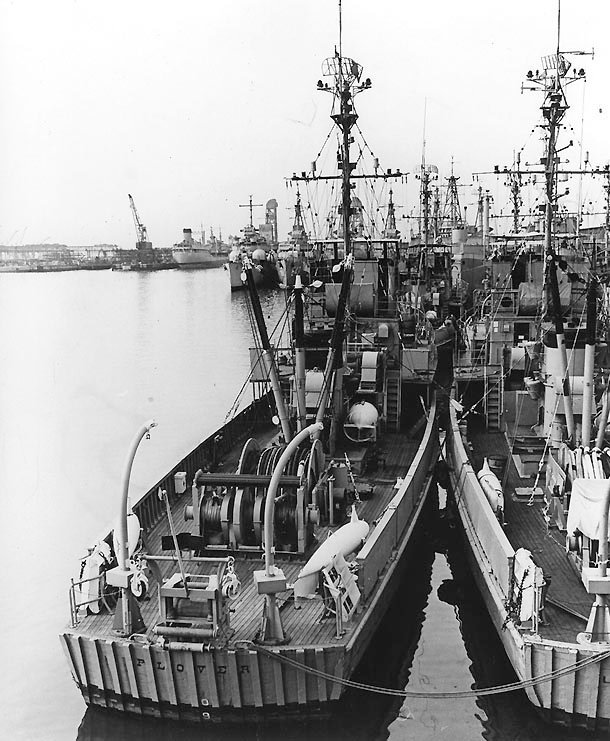

History

United States
- Name: USS YMS-442
- Builder: C. Hiltebrant Dry Dock Co.; Kingston, New York
- Laid down: 12 October 1943
- Launched: 20 April 1944
- Commissioned: 14 October 1944
- Decommissioned: November 1956
- Renamed: USS Plover (AMS-33), 18 February 1947
- Reclassified: MCS(O)-33, 18 February 1947
- Stricken: 1 October 1968
- Identification: identification=Call sign: NCLI
- Fate: Unknown

General characteristics
- Class & type: YMS-135 subclass of YMS-1-class minesweepers
- Displacement: 215 tons
- Length: 136 ft (41 m)
- Beam: 24 ft 6 in (7.47 m)
- Draft: 6 ft 1 in (1.85 m)
- Propulsion: 2 × 880 bhp General Motors 8-268A diesel engines; 2 shafts
- Speed: 12 knots (22 km/h)
- Complement: 50
- Armament: 1 × 3"/50 caliber gun mount; 2 × 20 mm guns; 2 × depth charge projectors

USS Plover (MSC(O)-33/AMS-33/YMS-442) was a YMS-1-class minesweeper of the YMS-135 subclass built for the U.S. Navy during World War II.

== History ==
YMS-442 was laid down 12 October 1943 by the C. Hiltebrant Dry Dock Co. of Kingston, New York, launched 20 April 1944, and completed 13 October 1944. She was commissioned on 14 October 1944.

YMS-442 departed Brooklyn, New York, and operated in the Okinawa area as an escort vessel during the autumn of 1945. Until spring 1946, she cleared shipping lanes off Japan, Korea, and China. Back from the Pacific, she provided occasional service to the Mine Warfare School, Yorktown, Virginia, during 1946 and into 1948.

YMS-442 became USS Plover (AMS–33) on 18 February 1947. In July 1948 she assisted in survey work off Labrador. From late 1948 to 1956 she assisted the Navy Mine Defense Laboratory, Panama City, Florida.

Reclassified a coastal minesweeper (old) MSC(O)-33 on 7 February 1955, she became a naval reserve training ship in November 1956. She served the 4th Naval District, Philadelphia, Pennsylvania, and in 1961 the 6th Naval District, Charleston, South Carolina.

Following these assignments, Plover was struck from the Naval Vessel Register 1 October 1968.
