= USS Sagacity =

Two ships of the United States Navy have been assigned the name USS Sagacity.

- USS Sagacity (AM-293) would have been an Admirable-class minesweeper. Construction, however, was canceled on 6 June 1944, prior to completion.
- USS Sagacity (MSO-469) was an Aggressive-class minesweeper, originally designated AM-469, then as AM-469. She was launched in 1954, reclassified as an ocean minesweeper, MSO-469, in 1955, and struck in 1970.
