= USS Chatterer (AMc-16) =

Minesweeper of the United States Navy

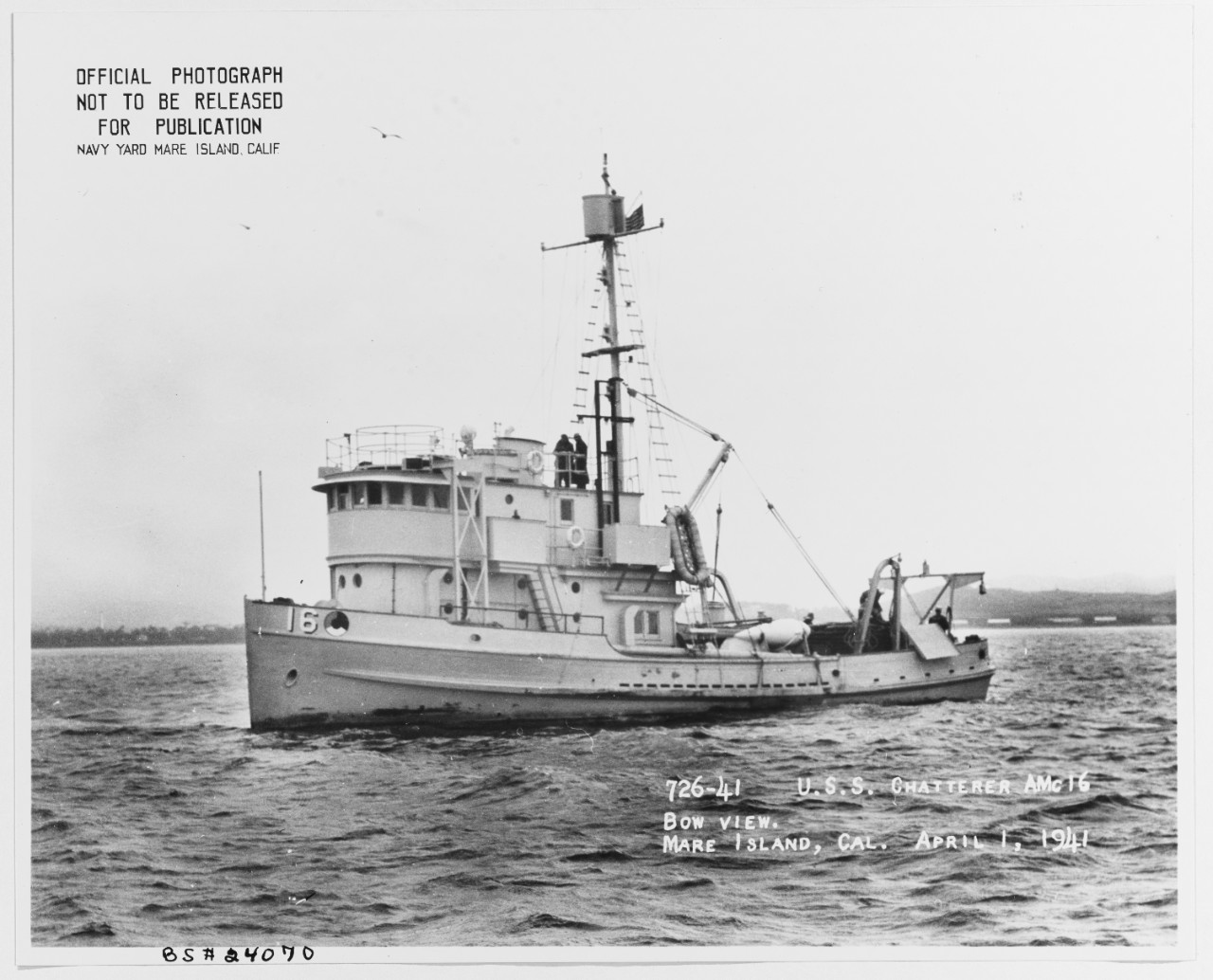
- USS Chatterer

History

United States
- Ordered: as Sea Breeze
- Laid down: date unknown
- Launched: date unknown
- Acquired: 20 November 1940
- In service: 20 November 1940
- Out of service: 12 September 1944
- Stricken: 14 October 1944
- Fate: fate unknown

General characteristics
- Displacement: not known
- Length: not known
- Beam: not known
- Draught: not known
- Speed: not known
- Complement: not known
- Armament: not known

USS Chatterer (AMc-16) was a Chatterer-class coastal minesweeper acquired by the U.S. Navy.

The first ship to be named Chatterer by the Navy, AMc-16, formerly Sea Breeze, was acquired by the Navy and placed in service on 20 November 1940.

== World War II service ==
Following conversion she was assigned to the Western Sea Frontier Force and later to the 12th Naval District.

== Post-war deactivation ==
Placed out of service on 12 September 1944, she was stricken from the Navy Register on 14 October of that year.
