= USS Egret (AMc-24) =

Minesweeper of the United States Navy

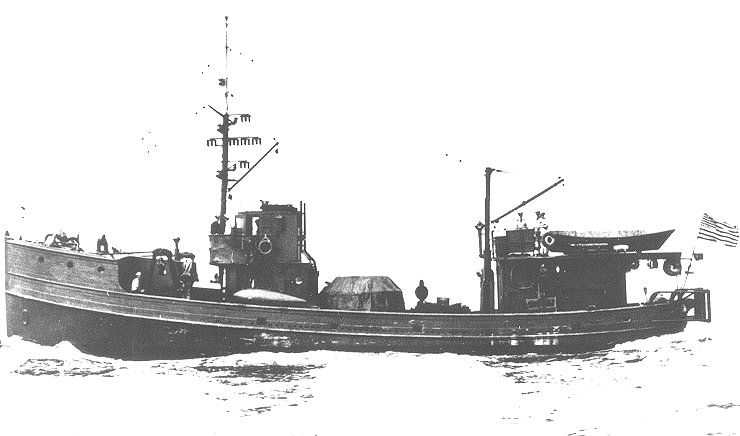

History

United States
- Laid down: date unknown
- Launched: date unknown
- In service: 10 June 1941
- Out of service: date unknown
- Stricken: c1946
- Fate: Transferred to the Maritime Commission for disposal 17 June 1946

General characteristics
- Displacement: 110 tons
- Length: 90 ft (27 m)
- Beam: 20 ft (6.1 m)
- Draft: 8.5 ft (2.6 m) (mean) (f.)
- Speed: 10.0 knots (19 km/h)
- Armament: two .50 cal (12.7 mm) machine guns

USS Egret (AMc-24) was an Egret-class coastal minesweeper acquired by the U.S. Navy for the dangerous task of removing mines from minefields laid in the water to prevent ships from passing.

== World War II service ==
The first ship to be named Egret by the Navy, AMc-24 was placed in service 10 June 1941 and during World War II served in the 4th Naval District and in the Potomac River Naval Command. She was reclassified IX-181, 17 July 1944.

Egret was transferred to the Maritime Commission for disposal 17 June 1946.
