= USS Flamingo (AMc-22) =

Minesweeper of the United States Navy

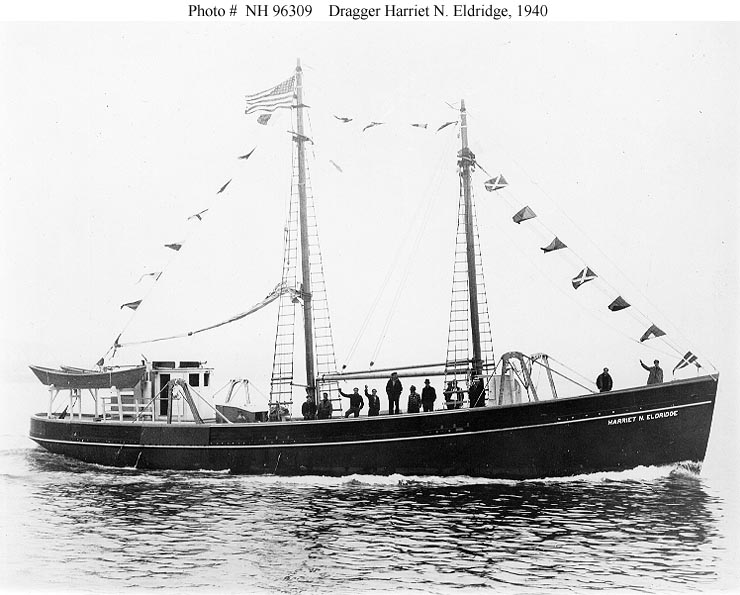

History

United States
- Name: USS Flamingo
- Launched: 1940, as Harriet N. Eldridge
- Acquired: 4 November 1940
- Commissioned: 6 June 1941
- Reclassified: IX-180 (Unclassified Miscellaneous Auxiliary), 17 July 1944
- Stricken: 8 January 1946
- Fate: Transferred to the Maritime Commission for sale, 6 January 1945

General characteristics
- Type: Coastal minesweeper
- Length: 90 ft (27 m)
- Beam: 20 ft (6.1 m)
- Draft: 10 ft (3.0 m)
- Armament: 2 × .30 caliber machine guns

USS Flamingo (AMc-22) was a coastal minesweeper of the United States Navy.

The ship was laid down in 1940 as the fishing dragger Harriet N. Eldridge, acquired by the U.S. Navy on 4 November 1940, and placed in service as Flamingo on 6 June 1941.

Flamingo was in service from 6 June 1941 to 10 December 1945, serving in the 4th Naval District and the Potomac River Naval Command.

She was redesignated and reclassified as the Unclassified Miscellaneous Auxiliary, IX-180 on 17 July 1944. Flamingo was struck from the Naval Vessel Register on 8 January 1946. Fate unknown.
