= USS Crow (AMS-7) =

Minesweeper of the United States Navy

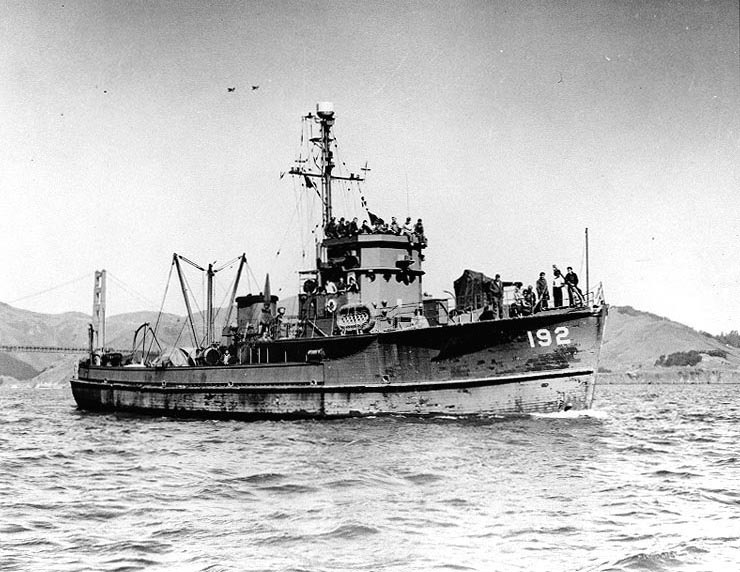
- A YMS-1-class minesweeper

History

United States
- Ordered: as YMS-215
- Laid down: 18 August 1942
- Launched: 22 February 1943
- Completed: 22 July 1943
- Commissioned: date unknown
- Decommissioned: date unknown
- Stricken: 1 November 1959
- Fate: fate unknown

General characteristics
- Displacement: 320 tons
- Length: 136 ft (41 m)
- Beam: 24 ft 6 in (7.47 m)
- Draught: 6 ft 1 in (1.85 m)
- Speed: 13 knots
- Complement: 33
- Armament: one 3 in (76 mm) gun mount, two 20 mm machine guns

USS Crow (AMS-7/YMS-215) was a YMS-1-class minesweeper of the YMS-135 subclass acquired by the U.S. Navy for the task of removing mines that had been placed in the water to prevent ships from passing.

Crow was constructed by Robert Jacob Inc., City Island, New York. She was laid down on 18 August 1942, launched on 22 February 1943, and was ready-for-sea on 22 July 1943.

YMS-215 was reclassified AMS-7 on 17 February 1947 and named Crow the following day.

Crow was struck from the Navy list on 1 November 1959.
