= USS YMS-477 =

Minesweeper of the United States Navy

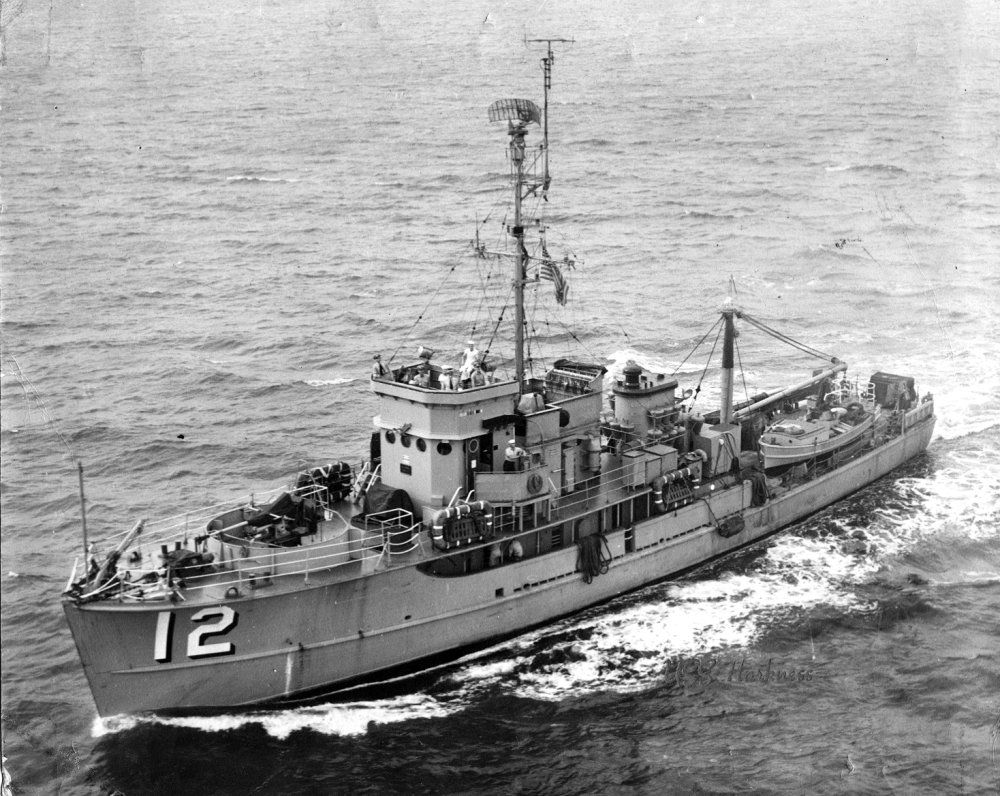
- A YMS-446 class minesweeper

History

United States
- Name: USS YMS-477
- Builder: Tacoma Boatbuilding Company, Tacoma, Washington
- Laid down: 12 July 1943 as PCS-1453
- Reclassified: YMS-477, 27 September 1943
- Launched: 6 November 1943
- Commissioned: 10 July 1944
- Stricken: 28 August 1946
- Fate: Sold in April 1947, fate unknown

General characteristics
- Displacement: 320 tons
- Length: 136 ft 0 in (41.45 m)
- Beam: 24 ft 6 in (7.47 m)
- Draft: 6 ft 1 in (1.85 m) (max.)
- Propulsion: 2 × 880 bhp General Motors 8-268A diesel engines; 2 shafts
- Speed: 12 knots (22 km/h)
- Complement: 33
- Armament: 1 × 3"/50 caliber gun mount; 2 × 20 mm guns; 2 × depth charge projectors

USS YMS-477 was a YMS-1-class minesweeper of the YMS-446 subclass built for the United States Navy during World War II. Originally ordered and laid down as USS PCS-1453 on 12 July 1943 by the Tacoma Boatbuilding Company of Tacoma, Washington, planned as a PCS-1376-class minesweeper, the vessel was re-designated YMS-477 of the YMS-1 class on 27 September 1943. The vessel was launched on 6 November and completed four days later. USS YMS-477 was commissioned soon after under the command of Lieutenant (junior grade) Russell V. Malo, USNR.

After wartime service, YMS-477 was decommissioned and then struck from the Naval Vessel Register on 28 August 1946. In April 1947, the former minesweeper was sold, but her ultimate fate is unknown.
