= USS Chaffinch (AM-81) =

Minesweeper of the United States Navy

History

United States
- Ordered: as Trimont
- Laid down: date unknown
- Launched: 1928
- Acquired: 29 November 1940
- Commissioned: 16 July 1941
- Decommissioned: 12 December 1945
- Stricken: date unknown
- Fate: Transferred to the Maritime Commission, 23 September 1946.

General characteristics
- Displacement: 401 tons
- Length: 122 ft 6 in (37.34 m)
- Beam: 23 ft 1 in (7.04 m)
- Draught: 10 ft 11 in (3.33 m)
- Speed: 10 knots
- Complement: 36
- Armament: one 3" gun mount

USS Chaffinch (AM-81) was a minesweeper acquired by the U.S. Navy during World War II for the dangerous task of removing mines from minefields laid in the water to prevent ships from passing.

== Career ==
Chaffinch was built in 1928 by the Bethlehem Shipbuilding Corp., Quincy, Massachusetts, as Trimont; purchased by the Navy 29 November 1940, and commissioned 16 July 1941.

Assigned to the 3d Naval District, Chaffinch arrived at New York City 10 August 1941. For the next year and a half, alert to the mounting German submarine menace, she swept for mines and patrolled waters off New York and New London, Connecticut. From 13 February 1943 until 8 January 1944, she performed similar duty off Newport, Rhode Island, under the 1st Naval District.

Continuing her essential support to the movement both of coastwise convoys, and those bound for distant ports, Chaffinch again served at New York Harbor until 1 August 1945, when she cleared for Charleston, South Carolina. There she was decommissioned 12 December 1945, and transferred to the Maritime Commission 23 September 1946.
