= USS Nightingale (AMS-50) =

Minesweeper of the United States Navy

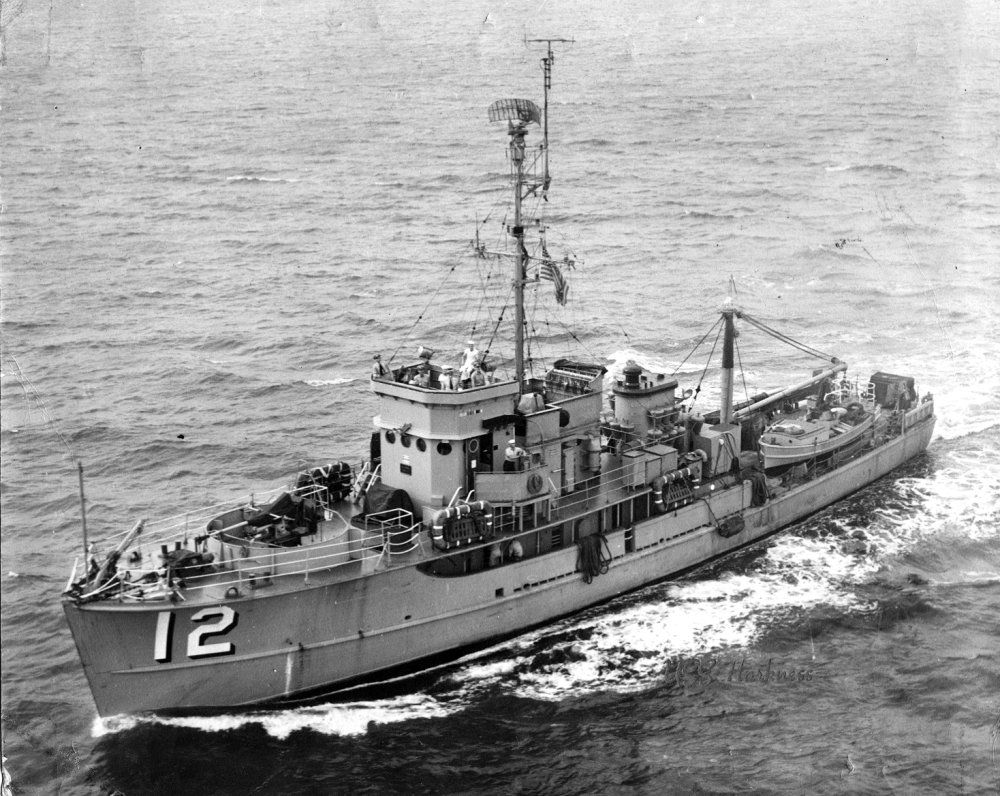
- A YMS-1-class minesweeper

History

United States
- Ordered: as YMS–290
- Laid down: date unknown
- Launched: 27 February 1943
- Commissioned: 17 July 1943
- Decommissioned: March 1950
- In service: February 1951
- Out of service: 1 November 1959
- Stricken: 1 November 1959
- Fate: Sold for scrap

General characteristics
- Displacement: 270 tons
- Length: 136 ft (41 m)
- Beam: 25 ft (7.6 m)
- Draft: 8 ft (2.4 m)
- Speed: 13.0 knots
- Complement: 26
- Armament: one 40 mm and four 20 mm machine guns

USS Nightingale (MSC(O)-50/AMS-50/YMS-290) was a YMS-1-class minesweeper of the YMS-135 subclass acquired by the U.S. Navy for the dangerous task of removing mines from minefields laid in the water to prevent ships from passing.

== Operational history ==
The fifth ship to be named Nightingale by the Navy, YMS-290 was built by the Associated Shipbuilding Co., Seattle, Washington, as YMS–290; launched 27 February 1943; sponsored by Miss Suzanne Marion, granddaughter of A. F. Marion, General Manager of Lake Union Drydock and Machine Works; and commissioned 17 July 1943.

After shakedown and training in Puget Sound, she departed for the western Pacific Ocean via Pearl Harbor. Throughout World War II she operated exclusively in the Pacific. She participated in the Gilbert Islands operations 13 November through 8 December, and continued minesweeping operations until the end of hostilities. YMS-290 was then assigned to minesweeping activities in the Kobe-Fukuoka area of Japan.

Returning from Japanese waters YMS-290 reached Boston, Massachusetts, and was assigned to the 1st Naval District as a Naval Reserve Training ship. On 1 September 1947 the ship was renamed Nightingale and reclassified to AMS–50. She continued as a Naval Reserve training ship until March 1950, when she put in at Green Cove Springs, Florida, and decommissioned.

Nightingale recommissioned February 1951 and served with the Mine Force, Atlantic Fleet. She operated out of Charleston, South Carolina, providing service along the U.S. East Coast from Yorktown, Virginia, to Panama City, Florida. Her home port was temporarily shifted to Panama City 1 January 1955 while she provided services for the Navy’s Mine Defense Laboratory. She was re-designated MSC(O)–50 on 7 February and then returned to Charleston.

She remained in an active status until 1 November 1959, when she decommissioned, was struck from the Navy List, and was sold for scrap.
