= USS Canary =

Minesweeper of the United States Navy

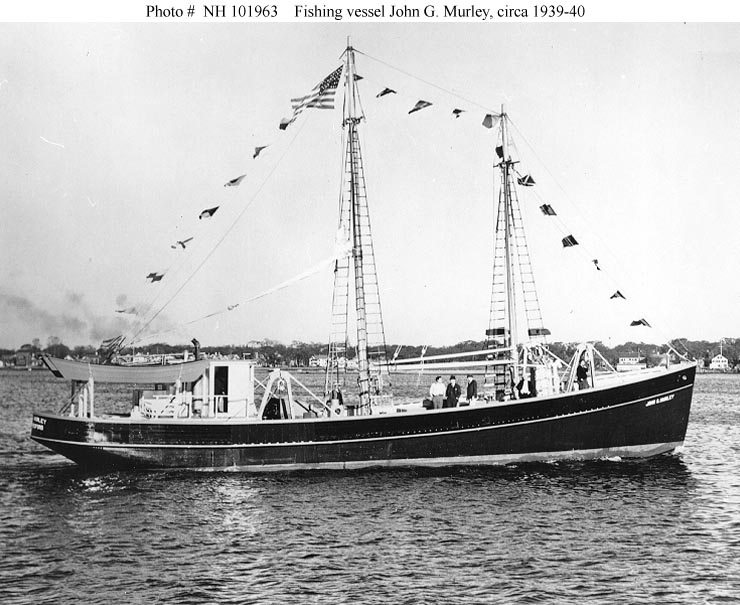
- John G. Murley (U.S. Fishing Vessel, 1939) Photographed c. 1939-40. She was acquired by the Navy in 1940 and became USS Canary (AMc-25).

History

United States
- Name: USS Canary
- Ordered: as John G. Murley
- Laid down: date unknown
- Launched: date unknown
- Acquired: 24 October 1940
- In service: 19 June 1941
- Out of service: date unknown
- Stricken: c. 1948
- Fate: Transferred to the Maritime Administration in June 1948

USS Canary (AMc-25) was a coastal minesweeper acquired by the U.S. Navy for the dangerous task of removing mines from minefields laid in the water to prevent ships from passing.

== World War II service ==
Canary, formerly John G. Murley, was acquired by the Navy on 24 October 1940, and following conversion, was placed in service on 19 June 1941 in the 4th Naval District.

== Reclassified YDT-7 tender ==
On 10 January 1944 she was re-classified YDT-7 and thereafter attached to the 5th Naval District for assignment in connection with diving, torpedo, mine and antisubmarine programs.

== Deactivation ==
Canary was transferred to the Maritime Administration in June 1948.
