= USS YMS-416 =

Minesweeper of the United States Navy

History

United States
- Name: USS YMS-416
- Laid down: 9 January 1944
- Launched: 28 May 1944
- Completed: 21 October 1944
- Stricken: 7 February 1947
- Fate: Burned and sunk in Lake Washington

General characteristics
- Class & type: YMS-135 subclass of YMS-1-class minesweepers
- Displacement: 270 tons
- Length: 136 ft (41 m)
- Beam: 24.6 ft (7.5 m)
- Draft: 8 ft (2.4 m)
- Propulsion: 2 × 880 bhp General Motors 8-268A diesel engines; 2 shafts
- Speed: 13 knots (24 km/h)
- Complement: 50
- Armament: 1 × 3"/50 caliber gun mount; 2 × 20 mm guns; 2 × depth charge projectors

The USS YMS-416 was a YMS-1 class minesweeper originally built for the United States Navy. After brief service during World War II, it was sold as a research ship and renamed Healys-1. Its fate was unknown for many years until it was discovered at the bottom of Lake Washington.

== History ==
YMS-416 was laid down by the Stadium Yacht Basin Inc., Cleveland, Ohio, 9 January 1944 and launched 28 May 1944. Completed 21 October 1944, records are unclear as to what role it played in World War II. Along with other surplus vessels, it was sold after the end of the war. It was used as a research vessel and renamed Healys-1. After this, it disappeared from public record; its fate was unknown until a burned hulk previously referred to as YMS-1 at the bottom of Lake Washington was positively identified as the former USS YMS-416.
