= USS Courser (AMS-6) =

Minesweeper of the United States Navy

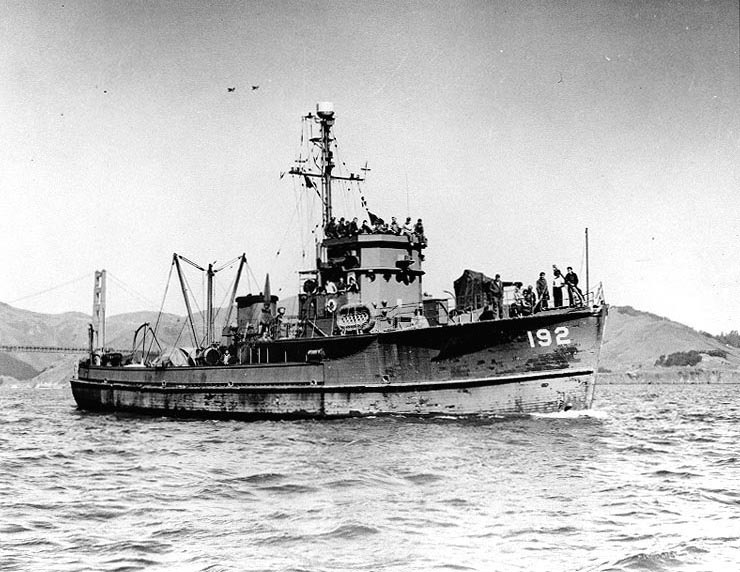
- A YMS-1-class minesweeper

History

United States
- Name: USS YMS-201
- Builder: Hiltebrant Dry Dock Co.; Kingston, New York
- Laid down: 28 August 1942
- Launched: 19 November 1942
- Completed: 24 July 1943
- Commissioned: Date unknown
- Reclassified: AMS-6, 17 February 1947
- Renamed: Courser, 18 February 1947
- Namesake: Probably the courser bird
- Reclassified: MSC(O)-6, 7 February 1955
- Decommissioned: Date unknown
- Stricken: 1 November 1959
- Fate: Unknown

General characteristics
- Class & type: YMS-135 subclass of YMS-1-class minesweepers
- Displacement: 270 t
- Length: 136 ft (41 m)
- Beam: 24 ft 6 in (7.47 m)
- Draft: 8 ft (2.4 m)
- Propulsion: 2 × 880 bhp General Motors 8-268A diesel engines; 2 shafts
- Speed: 15 knots (28 km/h)
- Complement: 32
- Armament: 1 × 3"/50 caliber dual purpose gun mount; 2 × 20 mm guns; 2 × depth charge projectors

USS Courser (MSC(O)-6/AMS-6/YMS-201) was a YMS-1-class minesweeper of the YMS-135 subclass built for the United States Navy during World War II. She was the second ship of the U.S. Navy to be named Courser.

== History ==
Courser was laid down as YMS-201 on 28 August 1942 by the Hiltebrant Dry Dock Co. of Kingston, New York; launched 19 November 1942; and completed 24 July 1943.

On 17 February 1947, YMS-201 was reclassified as AMS-6, and named Courser the following day.

Courser was reclassified MSC(O)-6 on 7 February 1955.

Courser was struck from the Naval Vessel Register on 1 November 1959. Her ultimate fate is unknown.
