= Astute =

Astute may refer to:

- HMS Astute (P447), launched 1945, Amphion-class submarine (United Kingdom), scrapped 1970
- HMS Astute (S119), launched 2007, nuclear-powered attack submarine (United Kingdom)
  - Astute-class submarine, a class of which HMS Astute (S119) is the lead ship
- USS Astute (AM-148), US Navy minesweeper
- Operation Astute, an Australian military operation in response to the 2006 East Timor crisis
