= USS Indicative =

Minesweeper of the United States Navy

History

United States
- Name: USS Indicative (AM-250)
- Builder: Savannah Machine and Foundry Company, Savannah, Georgia
- Laid down: 29 September 1943
- Launched: 12 December 1943
- Commissioned: 26 June 1944
- Decommissioned: 22 May 1945
- Fate: Transferred to Soviet Navy, 22 May 1945

History

Soviet Union
- Name: T-273
- Acquired: 22 May 1945
- Commissioned: 22 May 1945
- Renamed: Tsiklon, 1948
- Refit: Converted to naval trawler, 1948
- Fate: Scrapped 1960

General characteristics
- Class & type: Admirable-class minesweeper
- Displacement: 650 tons
- Length: 184 ft 6 in (56.24 m)
- Beam: 33 ft (10 m)
- Draft: 9 ft 9 in (2.97 m)
- Installed power: 1,710 shp (1.3 MW)
- Propulsion: 2 × ALCO 539 diesel engines; Farrel-Birmingham single reduction gear; 2 shafts
- Speed: 14.8 knots (27.4 km/h)
- Complement: 104
- Armament: 1 × 3"/50 caliber gun DP; 2 × twin Bofors 40 mm guns; 1 × Hedgehog anti-submarine mortar; 2 × depth charge tracks

USS Indicative (AM-250) was an Admirable-class minesweeper built for the United States Navy during World War II and in commission from 1944 to 1945. In 1945, she was transferred to the Soviet Union and served in the Soviet Navy as T-273. The Soviets converted her into a naval trawler in 1948 and renamed her Tsiklon.

== Construction and commissioning ==
Indicative was laid down on 29 September 1943 at Savannah, Georgia by the Savannah Machine and Foundry Company, launched on 12 September 1943, sponsored by Mrs. E. L. Smith;, and commissioned on 26 June 1944.

== Service history ==
=== U.S. Navy, World War II, 1944-1945 ===
Following shakedown and a training period at Little Creek, Virginia, Indicative departed on 19 August 1944 for antisubmarine exercises off Bermuda. She then took up regular duties as a convoy escort vessel between ports in the United States and Bermuda, protecting the convoys from German submarines operating in the western Atlantic Ocean.

Selected for transfer to the Soviet Navy in Project Hula – a secret program for the transfer of U.S. Navy ships to the Soviet Navy at Cold Bay, Territory of Alaska, in anticipation of the Soviet Union joining the war against Japan – Indicative departed New York City on 5 February 1945 and steamed by way of the Panama Canal Zone and United States West Coast ports to Cold Bay, where she arrived 4 April 1945 and began training her new Soviet crew.

=== Soviet Navy, 1945-1960 ===
Following the completion of training for her Soviet crew, Indicative was decommissioned on 22 May 1945 at Cold Bay and transferred to the Soviet Union under Lend-Lease immediately. Also commissioned into the Soviet Navy immediately, she was designated as a tralshik ("minesweeper") and renamed T-273 in Soviet service. She soon departed Cold Bay bound for Petropavlovsk-Kamchatsky in the Soviet Union, where she served in the Soviet Far East.

In February 1946, the United States began negotiations for the return of ships loaned to the Soviet Union for use during World War II, and on 8 May 1947, United States Secretary of the Navy James V. Forrestal informed the United States Department of State that the United States Department of the Navy wanted 480 of the 585 combatant ships it had transferred to the Soviet Union for World War II use returned. Deteriorating relations between the two countries as the Cold War broke out led to protracted negotiations over the ships, and by the mid-1950s the U.S. Navy found it too expensive to bring home ships that had become worthless to it anyway. Many ex-American ships were merely administratively "returned" to the United States and instead sold for scrap in the Soviet Union, while the U.S. Navy did not seriously pursue the return of others because it viewed them as no longer worth the cost of recovery. The Soviet Union never returned Capable to the United States, and in 1948 converted her into a naval trawler and renamed her Tsiklon. Meanwhile, the U.S. Navy reclassified her as a "fleet minesweeper," MSF-250 on 7 February 1955.

== Disposal ==
T-237 was scrapped in 1960. Unaware of her fate, the U.S. navy retained Indicative on its Naval Vessel Register until finally striking her name on 1 January 1983.
