= USS Method =

Minesweeper of the United States Navy

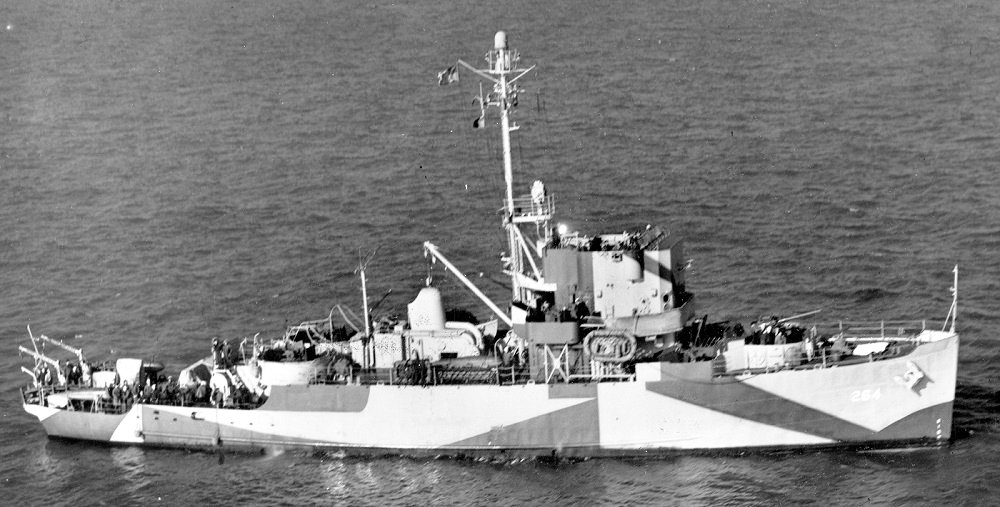
- Method seen in 1945

History

United States
- Name: USS Method (AM-264)
- Builder: American Shipbuilding Company, Lorain, Ohio
- Laid down: 7 June 1943
- Launched: 23 October 1943
- Sponsored by: Mrs. K. C. Thorton
- Commissioned: 10 July 1944
- Decommissioned: 21 May 1945
- Fate: Transferred to Soviet Navy, 21 May 1945
- Reclassified: MSF-264, 7 February 1955
- Stricken: 1 January 1983

History

Soviet Union
- Name: T-276
- Acquired: 21 May 1945
- Commissioned: 21 May 1945
- Refit: Converted to whalecatcher, 1948
- Renamed: Purga, 1948
- Fate: Scrapped 1960

General characteristics
- Class & type: Admirable-class minesweeper
- Displacement: 650 tons
- Length: 184 ft 6 in (56.24 m)
- Beam: 33 ft (10 m)
- Draft: 9 ft 9 in (2.97 m)
- Propulsion: 2 × ALCO 539 diesel engines, 1,710 shp (1.3 MW); Farrel-Birmingham single reduction gear; 2 shafts
- Speed: 14.8 knots (27.4 km/h)
- Complement: 104
- Armament: 1 × 3"/50 caliber gun DP; 2 × twin Bofors 40 mm guns; 1 × Hedgehog anti-submarine mortar; 2 × depth charge tracks

Service record
- Part of: United States Atlantic Fleet (1944-1945); United States Pacific Fleet (1945); Soviet Pacific Ocean Fleet (1945-1960)

USS Method (AM-264) was an Admirable-class minesweeper built for the United States Navy during World War II and in commission from 1944 to 1945. In 1945, she was transferred to the Soviet Union and served in the Soviet Navy after that as T-276. The Soviets converted her into a whalecatcher in 1948 and renamed her Purga.

== Construction and commissioning ==
Method was laid down on 7 June 1943 at Lorain, Ohio, by the American Shipbuilding Company, launched on 23 October 1943, sponsored by Mrs. K. C. Thorton, and commissioned on 10 July 1944.

== Service history ==
=== U.S. Navy, World War II, 1944-1945 ===
Method departed Lorain, Ohio, on 12 July 1944 and steamed via the St. Lawrence River to Little Creek, Virginia. Arriving there on 19 August 1944, she underwent shakedown training and on 27 September 1944 headed north to Casco Bay, Maine, for abbreviated antisubmarine warfare training. Thence, as a unit of Mine Division 37, she headed south and on 5 October 1944 arrived at Port Royal Bay, Bermuda, the western terminus of the southern transatlantic convoy route . She remained at Port Royal Bay until 8 November 1944, when she got underway for Norfolk, Virginia. There, for a month and a half, she conducted patrols and minesweeping operations and towed targets.

At the end of December 1944, Method reported for duty with Task Force 29, joining Mine Division 31. On 15 January 1945, she cleared Hampton Roads, Virginia, as escort to a gasoline (petrol) tanker bound for Navassa Island. Detached from that duty on 20 January 1945, she continued on to the Panama Canal Zone, transited the Panama Canal on 24 January 1945, and arrived at San Diego, California, on 2 February 1945 to report for duty with the Western Sea Frontier. In mid-February 1945 she steamed north to Washington, where she operated with the Strait of Juan de Fuca Defense Unit.

Selected for transfer to the Soviet Navy in Project Hula – a secret program for the transfer of U.S. Navy ships to the Soviet Navy at Cold Bay, Territory of Alaska, in anticipation of the Soviet Union joining the war against Japan – Method ceased her activities in the Strait of Juan de Fuca and departed on 26 March 1945 for Cold Bay, where she arrived on 4 April 1945 to begin familiarization training of her new Soviet crew.

=== Soviet Navy, 1945-1960 ===
Following the completion of training for her Soviet crew, Method was decommissioned on 21 May 1945 at Cold Bay and transferred to the Soviet Union under Lend-Lease immediately. Also commissioned into the Soviet Navy immediately, she was designated as a tralshik ("minesweeper") and renamed T-276 in Soviet service. Allocated to the Pacific Fleet (Тихо Oкеанский флот - TOF), she soon departed Cold Bay bound for Petropavlovsk-Kamchatsky in the Soviet Union, where she served in the Soviet Far East.

In February 1946, the United States began negotiations for the return of ships loaned to the Soviet Union for use during World War II, and on 8 May 1947, United States Secretary of the Navy James V. Forrestal informed the United States Department of State that the United States Department of the Navy wanted 480 of the 585 combatant ships it had transferred to the Soviet Union for World War II use returned. Deteriorating relations between the two countries as the Cold War broke out led to protracted negotiations over the ships, and by the mid-1950s the U.S. Navy found it too expensive to bring home ships that had become worthless to it anyway. Many ex-American ships were merely administratively "returned" to the United States and instead sold for scrap in the Soviet Union, while the U.S. Navy did not seriously pursue the return of others because it viewed them as no longer worth the cost of recovery. The Soviet Union never returned Method to the United States, instead transferring her to "Glavpromorrybprom" in 1948 for conversion to the whalecatcher Purga.

Meanwhile, the U.S. Navy reclassified Method as a "fleet minesweeper" (MSF) and redesignated her MSF-264 on 7 February 1955.

== Disposal ==
The ship was scrapped in 1960. Unaware of her fate, the U.S. Navy kept Method on its Naval Vessel Register until finally striking her on 1 January 1983.

== See also ==
- Purga as a whalecatcher
