= USS Caravan =

Minesweeper of the United States Navy

History

United States
- Name: USS Caravan (AMc-134)
- Builder: Willamette Iron and Steel Works, Portland, Oregon
- Reclassified: AM-157, 21 February 1942
- Laid down: 16 May 1942
- Launched: 27 October 1942
- Commissioned: 21 January 1944
- Decommissioned: 17 August 1945
- Fate: Transferred to Soviet Navy, 17 August 1945
- Reclassified: MSF-157, 7 February 1955
- Stricken: 1 January 1983

History

Soviet Union
- Name: T-337
- Acquired: 17 August 1945
- Fate: Scrapped 1960

General characteristics
- Class & type: Admirable-class minesweeper
- Displacement: 650 tons
- Length: 184 ft 6 in (56.24 m)
- Beam: 33 ft (10 m)
- Draft: 9 ft 9 in (2.97 m)
- Propulsion: 2 × ALCO 539 diesel engines, 1,710 shp (1.3 MW); Farrel-Birmingham single reduction gear; 2 shafts
- Speed: 14.8 knots (27.4 km/h)
- Complement: 104
- Armament: 1 × 3"/50 caliber gun DP; 2 × twin Bofors 40 mm guns; 1 × Hedgehog anti-submarine mortar; 2 × depth charge tracks

Service record
- Part of: U.S. Pacific Fleet (1944-1945); Soviet Pacific Ocean Fleet (1945-1960)

USS Caravan (AM-157) was an Admirable-class minesweeper built for the United States Navy during World War II and in commission from 1944 to 1945. In 1945, she was transferred to the Soviet Union and after that served in the Soviet Navy as T-337.

== Construction and commissioning ==
Originally classified as a "coastal minesweeper," AMc-134, Caravan was reclassified as a "minesweeper," AM-157, on 21 February 1942. She was launched on 27 October 1942 at Portland, Oregon, by Willamette Iron and Steel Works and commissioned on 21 January 1944.

== Service history ==
=== U.S. Navy, World War II, 1944-1945 ===
Caravan stood out of San Francisco, California, on 25 March 1944, bound for Pearl Harbor in the Territory of Hawaii and Majuro and Eniwetok in the Marshall Islands. She arrived at Eniwetok on 25 April 1944 and began operations as a patrol vessel, lifeguard for aviators downed during aircraft carrier strikes, and convoy escort. Her escort duties took her throughout the Mariana Islands, and in September 1944 she was rebased there at Guam. She moved to Ulithi in October 1944 – riding out a severe typhoon en route – to begin operations in the Palau Islands as well as the Marianas.

Selected for transfer to the Soviet Navy in Project Hula – a secret program for the transfer of U.S. Navy ships to the Soviet Navy at Cold Bay, Territory of Alaska, in anticipation of the Soviet Union joining the war against Japan – Caravan arrived at Portland, Oregon, in May 1945 for a pre-transfer overhaul. In July 1945 she arrived at Cold Bay to train her new Soviet crew.

=== Soviet Navy, 1945-1960 ===
Following the completion of training for her Soviet crew, Caravan was decommissioned on 17 August 1945 at Cold Bay and transferred to the Soviet Union under Lend-Lease immediately. Also commissioned into the Soviet Navy immediately, she was designated as a tralshik ("minesweeper") and renamed T-337 in Soviet service. She soon departed Cold Bay bound for Petropavlovsk-Kamchatsky in the Soviet Union, where she served in the Soviet Far East.

In February 1946, the United States began negotiations for the return of ships loaned to the Soviet Union for use during World War II, and on 8 May 1947, United States Secretary of the Navy James V. Forrestal informed the United States Department of State that the United States Department of the Navy wanted 480 of the 585 combatant ships it had transferred to the Soviet Union for World War II use returned. Deteriorating relations between the two countries as the Cold War broke out led to protracted negotiations over the ships, and by the mid-1950s the U.S. Navy found it too expensive to bring home ships that had become worthless to it anyway. Many ex-American ships were merely administratively "returned" to the United States and instead sold for scrap in the Soviet Union, while the U.S. Navy did not seriously pursue the return of others because it viewed them as no longer worth the cost of recovery. The Soviet Union never returned Caravan to the United States, although the U.S. Navy reclassified her as a "fleet minesweeper" (MSF) and redesignated her MSF-157 on 7 February 1955.

== Disposal ==
T-337 was scrapped in 1960. Unaware of her fate, the U.S. Navy kept Caravan on its Naval Vessel Register until finally striking her on 1 January 1983.
