= USS Mirth =

Minesweeper of the United States Navy

History

United States
- Name: USS Mirth (AM-265)
- Builder: American Shipbuilding Company, Lorain, Ohio
- Laid down: 31 July 1943
- Launched: 24 December 1943
- Sponsored by: Mrs. B. E. Gathercoal
- Commissioned: 12 August 1944
- Decommissioned: 21 May 1945
- Fate: Transferred to Soviet Union, 21 May 1945
- Reclassified: MSF-265, 7 February 1955
- Stricken: 1 January 1983

History

Soviet Union
- Name: T-277
- Acquired: 21 May 1945
- Commissioned: 21 May 1945
- Fate: Scrapped 1960

General characteristics
- Class & type: Admirable-class minesweeper
- Displacement: 650 tons
- Length: 184 ft 6 in (56.24 m)
- Beam: 33 ft (10 m)
- Draft: 9 ft 9 in (2.97 m)
- Propulsion: 2 × ALCO 539 diesel engines, 1,710 shp (1.3 MW); Farrel-Birmingham single reduction gear; 2 shafts
- Speed: 14.8 knots (27.4 km/h)
- Complement: 104
- Armament: 1 × 3"/50 caliber gun DP; 2 × twin Bofors 40 mm guns; 1 × Hedgehog anti-submarine mortar; 2 × Depth charge tracks

Service record
- Part of: United States Atlantic Fleet (1944-1945); Soviet Pacific Ocean Fleet (1945-1960)

USS Mirth (AM-265) was an Admirable-class minesweeper built for the United States Navy during World War II and in commission from 1944 to 1945. In 1945, she was transferred to the Soviet Union and served in the Soviet Navy after that as T-277. She was redesignated MSF-265 on 7 February 1955, and as of 1969 had not been returned or purchased by the Soviet Union.

== Construction and commissioning ==
Mirth was laid down on 31 July 1943 at Lorain, Ohio, by the American Shipbuilding Company, launched on 24 December 1943, sponsored by Mrs. B. E. Gathercoal, and commissioned on 12 August 1944.

== Service history ==
=== U.S. Navy, World War II, 1944-1945 ===
After shakedown in the Chesapeake Bay, Mirth, a unit of Mine Division 37, got underway on 29 November 1944 for brief duty with Naval Operating Base Bermuda. During December 1944 she operated from St. George's Bay, Bermuda, sweeping the channels and conducting antisubmarine patrols to ensure safe passage into the western terminus of the southern transatlantic convoy routes and escorting single vessels to mid-ocean join-ups with convoys en route.

Mirth arrived in Virginia at the end of December 1944 and then continued on to New York City on 3 January 1945. She remained in the New York City area throughout January 1945. She departed on 8 February 1945 for the Panama Canal and duty in the Pacific.

Selected for transfer to the Soviet Navy in Project Hula – a secret program for the transfer of U.S. Navy ships to the Soviet Navy at Cold Bay, Territory of Alaska, in anticipation of the Soviet Union joining the war against Japan – Mirth proceeded to Cold Bay, where she arrived on 3 April 1945 to begin familiarization training of her new Soviet crew.

=== Soviet Navy, 1945-1960 ===
Following the completion of training for her Soviet crew, Mirth was decommissioned on 21 May 1945 at Cold Bay and transferred to the Soviet Union under Lend-Lease immediately. Also commissioned into the Soviet Navy immediately, she was designated as a tralshik ("minesweeper") and renamed T-277 in Soviet service. She soon departed Cold Bay bound for Petropavlovsk-Kamchatsky in the Soviet Union, where she served in the Soviet Far East.

In February 1946, the United States began negotiations for the return of ships loaned to the Soviet Union for use during World War II, and on 8 May 1947, United States Secretary of the Navy James V. Forrestal informed the United States Department of State that the United States Department of the Navy wanted 480 of the 585 combatant ships it had transferred to the Soviet Union for World War II use returned. Deteriorating relations between the two countries as the Cold War broke out led to protracted negotiations over the ships, and by the mid-1950s the U.S. Navy found it too expensive to bring home ships that had become worthless to it anyway. Many ex-American ships were merely administratively "returned" to the United States and instead sold for scrap in the Soviet Union, while the U.S. Navy did not seriously pursue the return of others because it viewed them as no longer worth the cost of recovery. The Soviet Union never returned Mirth to the United States, instead converting her into a naval trawler in 1948 and renaming her Musson. Meanwhile, the U.S. Navy reclassified her as a "fleet minesweeper" (MSF) and redesignated her MSF-265 on 7 February 1955.

== Disposal ==
The ship was scrapped in 1960. Unaware of her fate, the U.S. Navy kept Mirth on its Naval Vessel Register until finally striking her on 1 January 1983.
