= USS Barrier =

Minesweeper of the United States Navy

History

United States
- Name: USS Barrier (AMc-127)
- Builder: Tampa Shipbuilding Company, Tampa, Florida
- Reclassified: AM-150, 21 February 1942
- Laid down: 7 December 1942
- Launched: 23 February 1943
- Sponsored by: Mrs. Eugenie Bradford
- Commissioned: 10 May 1944
- Decommissioned: 19 July 1945
- Fate: Transferred to Soviet Navy, 19 July 1945
- Reclassified: MSF-150, 7 February 1955
- Stricken: 1 January 1983

History

Soviet Union
- Name: T-335
- Acquired: 19 July 1945
- Commissioned: 19 July 1945
- Fate: Scrapped 1956

General characteristics
- Class & type: Admirable-class minesweeper
- Displacement: 650 tons
- Length: 184 ft 6 in (56.24 m)
- Beam: 33 ft (10 m)
- Draft: 9 ft 9 in (2.97 m)
- Propulsion: 2 × ALCO 539 diesel engines, 1,710 shp (1.3 MW); Farrel-Birmingham single reduction gear; 2 shafts
- Speed: 14.8 knots (27.4 km/h)
- Complement: 104
- Armament: 1 × 3"/50 caliber gun DP; 2 × twin Bofors 40 mm guns; 1 × Hedgehog anti-submarine mortar; 2 × depth charge tracks

Service record
- Part of: U.S. Pacific Fleet (1944-1945); Soviet Pacific Ocean Fleet (1945-1956)

USS Barrier (AM-150) was an Admirable-class minesweeper built for the United States Navy during World War II and in commission from 1944 to 1945. In 1945, she was transferred to the Soviet Union, serving in the Soviet Navy after that as T-335.

== Construction and commissioning ==
Originally classified as a "coastal minesweeper," AMc-127, Barrier was reclassified as a "minesweeper," AM-150, on 21 February 1942. She was laid down on 7 December 1942 at Tampa, Florida, by the Tampa Shipbuilding Company, Inc., launched on 23 February 1943, sponsored by Mrs. Eugenie Bradford, the wife of U.S. Navy Lieutenant L. M. Bradford, Assistant Technical Officer (Hull) at the builder's yard, and commissioned on 10 May 1944.

== Service history ==
=== U.S. Navy, World War II, 1944-1945 ===
Following fitting out and shakedown training, Barrier transited the Panama Canal late in July 1944 and made a stop at San Francisco, California, early in August 1944 before beginning duty in the waters of the Territory of Alaska on 14 August 1944. She performed convoy escort and minesweeping duties in the Aleutian Islands for the next 11 months.

Selected for transfer to the Soviet Navy in Project Hula – a secret program for the transfer of U.S. Navy ships to the Soviet Navy at Cold Bay, Alaska, in anticipation of the Soviet Union joining the war against Japan – Barrier proceeded to Cold Bay in the summer of 1945 to begin the training of her new Soviet crew.

=== Soviet Navy, 1945-1956 ===
Following the completion of training for her Soviet crew, Barrier was decommissioned on 19 July 1945 at Cold Bay and transferred to the Soviet Union under Lend-Lease immediately. Also commissioned into the Soviet Navy immediately, she was designated as a tralshik ("minesweeper") and renamed T-335 in Soviet service. She soon departed Cold Bay bound for Petropavlovsk-Kamchatsky in the Soviet Union, where she served in the Soviet Far East.

In February 1946, the United States began negotiations for the return of ships loaned to the Soviet Union for use during World War II, and on 8 May 1947, United States Secretary of the Navy James V. Forrestal informed the United States Department of State that the United States Department of the Navy wanted 480 of the 585 combatant ships it had transferred to the Soviet Union for World War II use returned. Deteriorating relations between the two countries as the Cold War broke out led to protracted negotiations over the ships, and by the mid-1950s the U.S. Navy found it too expensive to bring home ships that had become worthless to it anyway. Many ex-American ships were merely administratively "returned" to the United States and instead sold for scrap in the Soviet Union, while the U.S. Navy did not seriously pursue the return of others because it viewed them as no longer worth the cost of recovery. The Soviet Union never returned Barrier to the United States, although the U.S. Navy reclassified her as a "fleet minesweeper" (MSF) and redesignated her MSF-150 on 7 February 1955.

== Disposal ==
The Soviet Union scrapped T-335 in 1956. Unaware of the ship's fate, the U.S. Navy carried Barrier on its Naval Vessel Register until finally striking her name on 1 January 1983.
