= USS Bayonne =

Tacoma-class patrol frigate

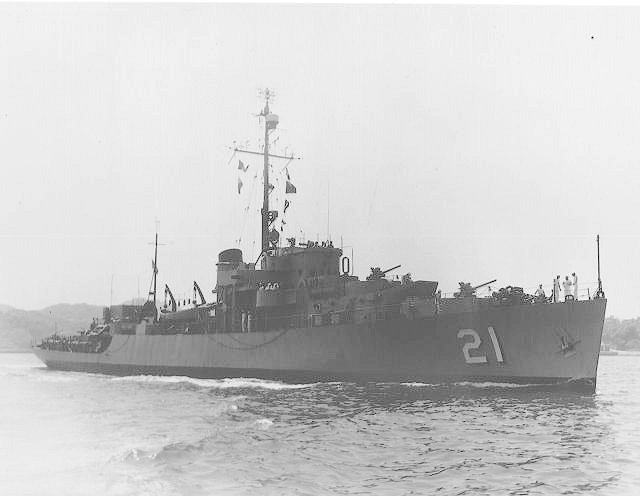
- USS Bayonne (PF-21), c. 1951.

History

United States
- Name: Bayonne
- Namesake: City of Bayonne, New Jersey
- Reclassified: PF-21, 15 April 1943
- Builder: American Ship Building Company, Cleveland, Ohio
- Yard number: 1013
- Laid down: 6 May 1943, as PG-129
- Launched: 11 September 1943
- Sponsored by: Mrs. Hannah Gallagher
- In service: 22 September 1944
- Out of service: 6 October 1944
- Commissioned: 14 February 1945
- Decommissioned: 2 September 1945
- Fate: Transferred to the Soviet Navy, 2 September 1945
- Acquired: Returned by Soviet Navy, 14 November 1949
- Recommissioned: 28 July 1950
- Decommissioned: 31 January 1953
- Honors and awards: 6 battle stars, Korean War
- Fate: Transferred to Japan Maritime Self-Defense Force, 31 January 1953
- Stricken: 1 December 1961
- Acquired: Returned by Japan Maritime Self-Defense Force, 27 June 1967
- Fate: Sunk as a target, 1 March 1968

Soviet Union
- Name: EK-25
- Acquired: 2 September 1945
- Commissioned: 2 September 1945
- Fate: Returned to United States, 14 November 1949

Japan
- Name: Buna
- Acquired: 31 January 1953
- Renamed: YAC-11, 1 February 1965
- Reclassified: Auxiliary stock craft (YAC), 1 February 1965
- Decommissioned: 31 March 1965
- Fate: Returned to United States, 27 June 1967

General characteristics
- Class & type: Tacoma-class frigate
- Displacement: 1,430 long tons (1,453 t) light; 2,415 long tons (2,454 t) full
- Length: 303 ft 11 in (92.63 m)
- Beam: 37 ft 11 in (11.56 m)
- Draft: 13 ft 8 in (4.17 m)
- Propulsion: 2 × 5,500 shp (4,101 kW) turbines; 3 boilers; 2 shafts
- Speed: 20 knots (37 km/h; 23 mph)
- Complement: 190
- Armament: 3 × 3"/50 dual purpose guns (3x1); 4 x 40 mm guns (2×2); 9 × 20 mm guns (9×1); 1 × Hedgehog anti-submarine mortar; 8 × Y-gun depth charge projectors; 2 × Depth charge tracks

USS Bayonne (PF-21), a Tacoma-class frigate in commission in 1945 and from 1950 to 1953, thus far has been the only ship of the United States Navy to be named for Bayonne, New Jersey. She later served in the Soviet Navy as EK-25 and in the Japan Maritime Self-Defense Force as JDS Buna (PF-14), JDS Buna (PF-294) and as YAC-11.

== Construction and commissioning ==
Bayonne was laid down under a Maritime Commission contract (MC hull 1487) on 6 May 1943, at Cleveland, Ohio, by the American Ship Building Company and launched on 11 September 1943, sponsored by Mrs. Hannah Gallagher. She was placed in non-commissioned service on 22 September 1944, for a voyage to Baltimore, Maryland, where she arrived on 2 October 1944, and was placed out of service on 6 October 1944. Upon the completion of her fitting-out, she was commissioned at Baltimore, on 14 February 1945.

== Service history ==
=== US Navy, World War II, 1945 ===
Bayonne moved south to Hampton Roads, Virginia, at the end of February 1945 and, on 3 March 1945, put to sea bound for Guantánamo Bay, Cuba, whence she conducted her shakedown training. On 3 April 1945, she departed the Guantánamo Bay operating area and, after stops at Kingston, Jamaica, and New York City, entered the Philadelphia Navy Yard at Philadelphia, Pennsylvania, for post-shakedown repairs. She completed repairs early in May 1945 and on 7 May 1945 headed for New York City. Arriving the following day, Bayonne remained there for almost two months.

Selected for transfer to the Soviet Navy in Project Hula, a secret program for the transfer of U.S. Navy ships to the Soviet Navy at Cold Bay in the Territory of Alaska in anticipation of the Soviet Union joining the war against Japan, Bayonne got underway on 3 July 1945 and steamed via the Panama Canal to Bremerton, Washington, where she entered the Puget Sound Navy Yard for a short period of repairs. During the last week of August 1945, she proceeded to Cold Bay and soon began the training of her new Soviet crew.

=== Soviet Navy, 1945–1949 ===
Following the completion of training for her Soviet crew, Bayonne was decommissioned on 2 September 1945 at Cold Bay and transferred to the Soviet Union under Lend-Lease immediately along with her sister ship USS Poughkeepsie (PF-26). Commissioned into the Soviet Navy immediately, Bayonne was designated as a storozhevoi korabl ("escort ship") and renamed EK-25 in Soviet service. She soon departed Cold Bay bound for Petropavlovsk-Kamchatsky in the Soviet Union. Too late for World War II service with the Soviet Navy, EK-25 served as a patrol vessel in the Soviet Far East.

In February 1946, the United States began negotiations for the return of ships loaned to the Soviet Union for use during World War II. On 8 May 1947, United States Secretary of the Navy James V. Forrestal informed the United States Department of State that the United States Department of the Navy wanted 480 of the 585 combatant ships it had transferred to the Soviet Union for World War II use returned, EK-25 among them. Negotiations for the return of the ships were protracted, but on 14 November 1949 the Soviet Union finally returned EK-25 to the U.S. Navy at Yokosuka, Japan.

=== US Navy, Korean War, 1950–1953 ===
Reverting to her old name, Bayonne was placed in the Pacific Reserve Fleet and remained inactive at Yokosuka until recommissioned there on 28 July 1950 for service in the Korean War.

On 11 September 1950, Bayonne left Kobe, Japan, in company with Task Group (TG) 90.7, bound for the west coast of Korea. On 15 September 1950, she screened the amphibious force when United Nations forces landed at Inchon. She continued service in Korean waters for the next 16 months, making voyages to Japan intermittently for repairs and liberty. Until the end of August 1951, Bayonne continued to serve with TG 90.7; after that she operated with TG 92.1 in the waters near Wonsan and Songjin on Korea's east coast.

Bayonne was decommissioned at Yokosuka on 31 January 1953.

=== Japan Maritime Self-Defense Force, 1953–1957 ===
In October 1953, the United States loaned Bayonne to Japan for service in the Japan Maritime Self-Defense Force, which named her JDS Buna (PF-14) (ぶな (PF-14); "fagus crenata"). The JMSDF reclassified her as PF-294 on 1 September 1957. The U.S. Navy struck her name from the Navy list on 1 December 1961 and transferred her to Japan outright in August 1962. Buna was reclassified as an "auxiliary stock craft" (YAC) and renamed YAC-11 on 1 February 1965. Decommissioned on 31 March 1965, she was returned to the United States on 27 June 1967 for disposal and sunk as a target on 1 March 1968.

== Awards ==
- Korean Service Medal with six battle stars

The U.S. Navy awarded Bayonne six battle stars for her service in the Korean War.
