= USS Penetrate =

Minesweeper of the United States Navy

History

United States
- Name: USS Penetrate (AM-271)
- Builder: Gulf Shipbuilding Corporation, Chickasaw, Alabama
- Laid down: 5 January 1943
- Launched: 11 September 1943
- Sponsored by: Miss Frances M. Moyer
- Commissioned: 31 March 1944
- Decommissioned: 22 May 1945
- Fate: Transferred to Soviet Union, 22 May 1945
- Reclassified: MSF-271, 7 February 1955
- Stricken: 1 January 1983

History

Soviet Union
- Name: T-280
- Acquired: 22 May 1945
- Commissioned: 22 May 1945
- Refit: Converted to naval trawler, 1948
- Renamed: Taifun, 1948
- Fate: Scrapped 1960

General characteristics
- Class & type: Admirable-class minesweeper
- Displacement: 650 tons
- Length: 184 ft 6 in (56.24 m)
- Beam: 33 ft (10 m)
- Draft: 9 ft 9 in (2.97 m)
- Propulsion: 2 × ALCO 539 diesel engines, 1,710 shp (1.3 MW); Farrel-Birmingham single reduction gear; 2 shafts
- Speed: 14.8 knots (27.4 km/h)
- Complement: 104
- Armament: 1 × 3"/50 caliber gun DP; 2 × twin Bofors 40 mm guns; 1 × Hedgehog anti-submarine mortar; 2 × depth charge tracks

Service record
- Part of: US Atlantic Fleet (1944–1945); Soviet Pacific Ocean Fleet (1945–1960)

USS Penetrate (AM-271) was an Admirable-class minesweeper built for the United States Navy during World War II and in commission from 1944 to 1945. In 1945, she was transferred to the Soviet Union and after that served in the Soviet Navy as T-280. The Soviets converted her into a naval trawler in 1948 and renamed her Taifun.

== Construction and commissioning ==
Penetrate was laid down at Chickasaw, Alabama, by the Gulf Shipbuilding Corporation on 5 January 1943. She was launched on 11 September 1943, sponsored by Miss Frances M. Moyer, and commissioned on 31 March 1944.

== Service history ==
=== U.S. Navy, World War II, 1944-1945 ===
On 14 April 1944, Penetrate stood downriver from Chickasaw to the Gulf of Mexico and from there proceeded to the United States East Coast and shakedown in the Chesapeake Bay. By late May 1944, she was undergoing training in Casco Bay, Maine, and, on 1 June 1944, she steamed north to Naval Station Argentia in the Dominion of Newfoundland, where she was converted to a weather ship. For the next six months she patrolled on weather reporting duties in the North Atlantic Ocean between Greenland and Canada to track and record changes in the polar maritime air masses affecting the European battlefronts and the transatlantic air routes.

In early January 1945, Penetrate's meteorological instruments were removed and minesweeping gear was reinstalled. On 31 January 1945 she headed south to Philadelphia, Pennsylvania, arriving there on 7 February 1945 for an abbreviated overhaul.

Selected for transfer to the Soviet Navy in Project Hula – a secret program for the transfer of U.S. Navy ships to the Soviet Navy at Cold Bay, Territory of Alaska, in anticipation of the Soviet Union joining the war against Japan – Penetrate departed Philadelphia on 27 February 1945, transited the Panama Canal, and proceeded to Cold Bay, where she arrived on 15 April 1945 and began familiarization training for her new Soviet crew.

=== Soviet Navy, 1945-1960 ===
Following the completion of training for her Soviet crew, Penetrate was decommissioned on 22 May 1945 at Cold Bay and transferred to the Soviet Union under Lend-Lease immediately. Also commissioned into the Soviet Navy immediately, she was designated as a tralshik ("minesweeper") and renamed T-280 in Soviet service. She soon departed Cold Bay bound for Petropavlovsk-Kamchatsky in the Soviet Union, where she entered service with the Soviet Pacific Ocean Fleet.

In February 1946, the United States began negotiations for the return of ships loaned to the Soviet Union for use during World War II, and on 8 May 1947, United States Secretary of the Navy James V. Forrestal informed the United States Department of State that the United States Department of the Navy wanted 480 of the 585 combatant ships it had transferred to the Soviet Union for World War II use returned. Deteriorating relations between the two countries as the Cold War broke out led to protracted negotiations over the ships, and by the mid-1950s the U.S. Navy found it too expensive to bring home ships that had become worthless to it anyway. Many ex-American ships were merely administratively "returned" to the United States and instead sold for scrap in the Soviet Union, while the U.S. Navy did not seriously pursue the return of others because it viewed them as no longer worth the cost of recovery. The Soviet Union never returned Penetrate to the United States, instead converting her into a naval trawler in 1948 and renaming her Taifun. Meanwhile, the U.S. Navy reclassified her as a "fleet minesweeper" (MSF) and redesignated her MSF-271 on 7 February 1955.

== Disposal ==
The ship was scrapped in 1960. Unaware of her fate, the U.S. Navy kept Penetrate on its Naval Vessel Register until finally striking her on 1 January 1983.
