= USS Candid =

Minesweeper of the United States Navy

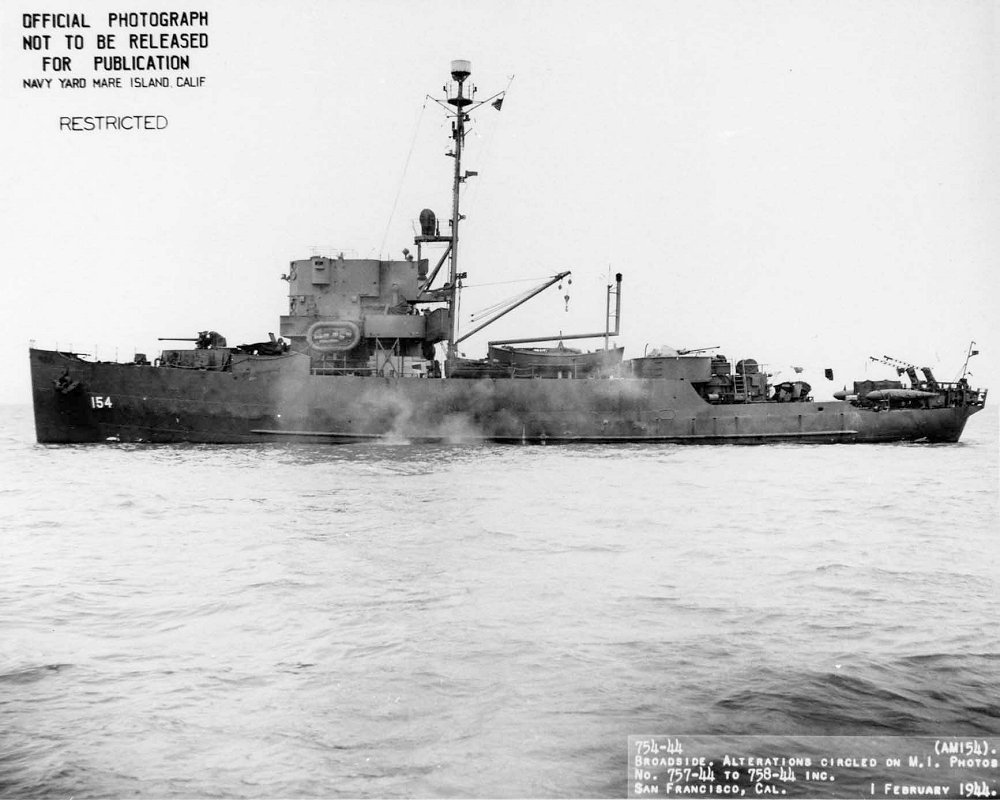
- USS Candid off San Francisco, 1 February 1944

History

United States
- Name: USS Candid (AMc-131)
- Builder: Willamette Iron and Steel Works
- Reclassified: AM-154, 21 February 1942
- Laid down: 27 April 1942
- Launched: 14 October 1942
- Commissioned: 31 October 1943
- Decommissioned: 17 August 1945
- Fate: Transferred to Soviet Navy 17 August 1945
- Reclassified: MSF-154, 7 February 1955
- Stricken: 1 January 1983

History

Soviet Union
- Name: T-283
- Acquired: 17 August 1945
- Commissioned: 17 August 1945
- Fate: Stricken 1958

General characteristics
- Class & type: Admirable-class minesweeper
- Displacement: 650 tons
- Length: 184 ft 6 in (56.24 m)
- Beam: 33 ft (10 m)
- Draft: 9 ft 9 in (2.97 m)
- Propulsion: 2 × ALCO 539 diesel engines, 1,710 shp (1.3 MW); Farrel-Birmingham single reduction gear; 2 shafts
- Speed: 14.8 knots (27.4 km/h)
- Complement: 104
- Armament: 1 × 3"/50 caliber gun DP; 2 × twin Bofors 40 mm guns; 1 × Hedgehog anti-submarine mortar; 2 × depth charge tracks

Service record
- Part of: U.S. Pacific Fleet (1943-1945); Soviet Pacific Ocean Fleet (1945-1958)

USS Candid (AM-154) was an Admirable-class minesweeper built for the United States Navy during World War II and in commission from 1943 to 1945. In 1945, she was transferred to the Soviet Union and served after that in the Soviet Navy as T-283.

== Construction and commissioning ==
Originally classified as a "coastal minesweeper," AMc-131, Candid was reclassified as a "minesweeper," AM-154, on 21 February 1942. She was launched on 14 October 1942 at Portland, Oregon, by Willamette Iron and Steel Works and commissioned on 31 October 1943.

== Service history ==
Candid departed San Francisco, California, on 28 February 1944 for duty in the waters of the Territory of Alaska. Called upon to escort convoys and conduct patrols as well as to sweep for mines, she sailed through stormy waters to fog-bound ports in the Aleutian Islands, supporting United States Army units on the isolated islands and backing up U.S. Navy attacks on the Kuril Islands of northern Japan. She returned to San Francisco on 18 August 1944, and two weeks later got underway for the Marshall Islands for operations there and in the Mariana Islands, providing local escort services in support of the consolidation of these islands and their development as bases for naval and air strikes against the Japanese.

On 16 April 1945, Candid got underway for Seattle, Washington and an overhaul. Selected for transfer to the Soviet Navy in Project Hula – a secret program for the transfer of U.S. Navy ships to the Soviet Navy at Cold Bay, Alaska, in anticipation of the Soviet Union joining the war against Japan – she departed Seattle in the summer of 1945 after the completion of her overhaul and proceeded to Cold Bay to begin familiarization training for her new Soviet crew.

=== Soviet Navy, 1945-1958 ===
Following the completion of training for her Soviet crew, Candid was decommissioned on 17 August 1945 at Cold Bay and transferred to the Soviet Union under Lend-Lease immediately. Also commissioned into the Soviet Navy immediately, she was designated as a tralshik ("minesweeper") and renamed T-283 in Soviet service. She soon departed Cold Bay bound for Petropavlovsk-Kamchatsky in the Soviet Union, where she served in the Soviet Far East.

In February 1946, the United States began negotiations for the return of ships loaned to the Soviet Union for use during World War II, and on 8 May 1947, United States Secretary of the Navy James V. Forrestal informed the United States Department of State that the United States Department of the Navy wanted 480 of the 585 combatant ships it had transferred to the Soviet Union for World War II use returned. Deteriorating relations between the two countries as the Cold War broke out led to protracted negotiations over the ships, and by the mid-1950s the U.S. Navy found it too expensive to bring home ships that had become worthless to it anyway. Many ex-American ships were merely administratively "returned" to the United States and instead sold for scrap in the Soviet Union, while the U.S. Navy did not seriously pursue the return of others because it viewed them as no longer worth the cost of recovery. The Soviet Union never returned Candid to the United States, although the U.S. Navy reclassified her as a "fleet minesweeper" (MSF) and redesignated her MSF-154 on 7 February 1955.

== Disposal ==
The Soviet Navy struck T-283 from its vessel register in 1958. Unaware of her fate, the U.S. Navy kept Candid on its Naval Vessel Register until finally striking her on 1 January 1983.
