= Project Hula =

US plan to give ships to the Soviet Union in WWII

- Part of the Pacific War of World War II
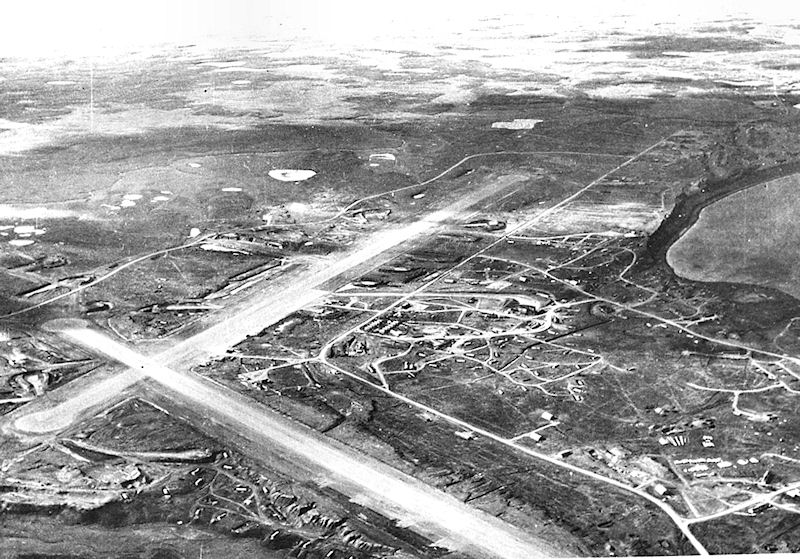
- Fort Randall at Cold Bay, Territory of Alaska, in 1942. Project Hula took place here in 1945. The head of the bay itself is at center right.
- Operational scope: Transfer of US Navy vessels to the Soviet Union in anticipation of the Invasion of Japan
- Location: Cold Bay, Territory of Alaska
- Date: 20 March 1945 – 30 September 1945
- Outcome: Japan surrendered before completion of the operation

Project Hula was a secret program during World War II in which the United States transferred naval vessels to the Soviet Union in anticipation of the Soviets eventually joining the war against Japan, specifically in preparation for planned Soviet invasions of southern Sakhalin and the Kuril Islands. Based at Cold Bay in the Territory of Alaska, the project was active during the spring and summer of 1945. It was the largest and most ambitious transfer program of World War II, it included 149 ships delivered (of 180 expected, returned until 1955) and 12,000 personnel trained between 16 April and 4 September 1945 and the US-handed then-Soviet ships took part in the last war operations of 5 September in Manchukuo, northern Korea, the Japanese south of Sakhalin Island, and the Kuril Islands.

== Origins of Project Hula ==
The Russian Empire and Japan had previously fought the Russo-Japanese War in 1904–1905, followed by Japan sending troops into Siberia during the Russian Civil War in the Siberian Intervention of 1918–1920. Animosities continued as the two countries remained rivals in Northeast Asia after the establishment of the Soviet Union. Japan's increasingly aggressive political and military behavior in East Asia during the 1930s led to border clashes between Soviet forces and Japanese forces in the Japanese puppet state of Manchukuo in Manchuria in 1937, at Kanchatzu Island in the Amur River, and in 1939 in the Khalkhin Gol/Nomonhan Incident. But after 1939, the two countries turned their attention elsewhere – Japan to focus on the Second Sino-Japanese War in China and the Soviet Union to the signing of the Molotov–Ribbentrop Pact. Eventually, the Soviet–Japanese Neutrality Pact was signed on 13 April 1941.

The Soviet Union entered World War II when Germany invaded in June 1941, and in December 1941 Japan entered the war by attacking Allied forces and territories in the Western Pacific and Southeast Asia. Although these events placed the countries on opposite sides in the war, neither had an interest in engaging in military operations against the other, both being fully occupied with the wars in which they already were involved. Thus, the countries maintained a scrupulous neutrality toward one another until almost the very end of World War II; other than inspecting cargos to ensure they did not include war materials and protesting the reflagging of American ships as Soviet ones, Japan did not deliberately interfere militarily with Lend-Lease convoys carrying war materiel from the United States to the Soviet Union in the North Pacific, and the Soviet Union turned down American requests to base American aircraft on Soviet territory for operations against Japan and ignored Allied requests for any other actions which might provoke Japan. The Soviet Union's leader, Josef Stalin, took the position that Soviet entry into the war against Japan would not be possible until after the defeat of Germany.

During a meeting with United States Ambassador to the Soviet Union Averell Harriman in October 1944, Stalin finally offered to enter the war against Japan, but not until three months after the surrender of Germany, whenever that might be. The Soviet Union had suffered massive military, civilian, and economic losses during the war, so he also made such an entry contingent upon the Allies providing substantial assistance to the Soviet Union in building up its armed forces and military supplies in East Asia and the Pacific in advance of any Soviet operations against Japan. After the Soviet Union provided a list of equipment it required, which the Americans codenamed MILEPOST, the United States began the work of meeting the Soviet requirements outside of and in addition to annual Lend-Lease allotments of aid to the Soviets.

As part of MILEPOST, the Chief of the Soviet Main Naval Staff, Admiral Vladimir Alafuzov, and the deputy commander of the U.S. Military Mission in Moscow, Rear Admiral Clarence E. Olsen, agreed on 20 December 1944 to a list of a dozen types of ships and aircraft the United States would transfer to the Soviets. Among the ships were various types of escort vessels, landing craft, and minesweepers. Olsen also recommended that a "program for training of personnel and for delivery of some of each type of ship should be set up at once" so that Soviet crews could receive instruction from American personnel in the operation of the ships and craft transferred to them.

== Choosing a location ==
Cold Bay
- Cold Bay lies on the Alaska Peninsula in Alaska.
- Coordinates: 55°12′33″N 162°42′51″W

In early January 1945, the commander-in-chief of the Soviet Navy, Admiral Nikolai Gerasimovich Kuznetsov, suggested that the United States establish the location for the transfer of ships and training of crews in the Territory of Alaska's Aleutian Islands, where the presence of only a very small civilian population would help to assure the security of the program, which was to be conducted in strict secrecy to avoid alerting the Japanese and perhaps provoking Japan into launching an attack against the Soviet Union. He suggested Dutch Harbor, on Unalaska Island, as a good choice; both the Soviet Navy and merchant marine frequently called there and at nearby Akutan, so Soviet personnel were most familiar with those waters.

On 18 January 1945, the U.S. Chief of Naval Operations and Commander-in-Chief of the U.S. Navy, Fleet Admiral Ernest J. King, contacted the Commander of the North Pacific Force, Admiral Frank Jack Fletcher, to alert him that the United States planned to transfer approximately 250 ships and craft to the Soviet Union between April and December 1945, and that about 2,500 personnel would be present at any given time at the transfer site with a two-week cycle of personnel turnover; he also inquired as to whether Dutch Harbor could accommodate such a program. Fletcher responded on 29 January 1945, rejecting Dutch Harbor because of the lack of housing and training space there and because its harbor was too small to accommodate the expected numbers of ships and too exposed to heavy seas for safe training. He recommended Cold Bay, on the Alaska Peninsula, as a much better choice because of its protected harbor, shore facilities, and the complete absence of a civilian population, making security of the program much easier than at Dutch Harbor. Kodiak, on Kodiak Island, which had adequate shore facilities but a harbor inadequately protected from rough seas, was Fletcher's second choice, and Dutch Harbor only his third. King duly informed the U.S. Military Mission in Moscow of the choice of Cold Bay.

During a meeting with King at the Yalta Conference on 8 February 1945, Kuznetsov stated that Dutch Harbor was the Soviet Union's first choice, and Kodiak its second. King informed him that the United States had chosen Cold Bay. Kuznetsov was not familiar with Cold Bay, but upon finding it on a map immediately agreed to it as the training site.

== Planning ==
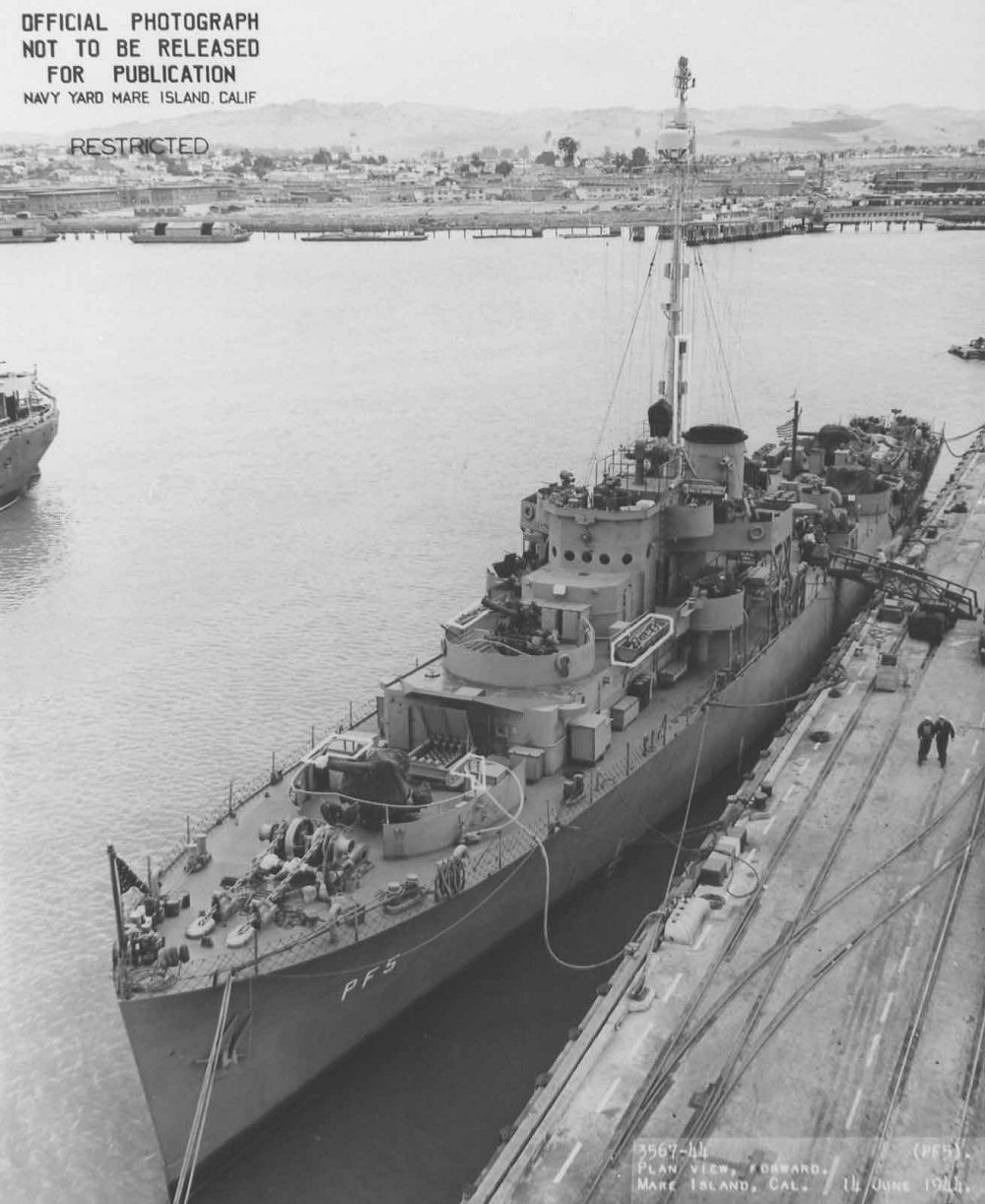
The Tacoma-class patrol frigate USS Hoquiam (PF-5) at Mare Island Navy Yard, Vallejo, California, on 14 June 1944. Transferred at Cold Bay, on 16 August 1945, she became EK-13 in the Soviet Navy, and was returned to the United States in 1949. The patrol frigates were the largest, most heavily armed, and most expensive ships transferred in Project Hula.

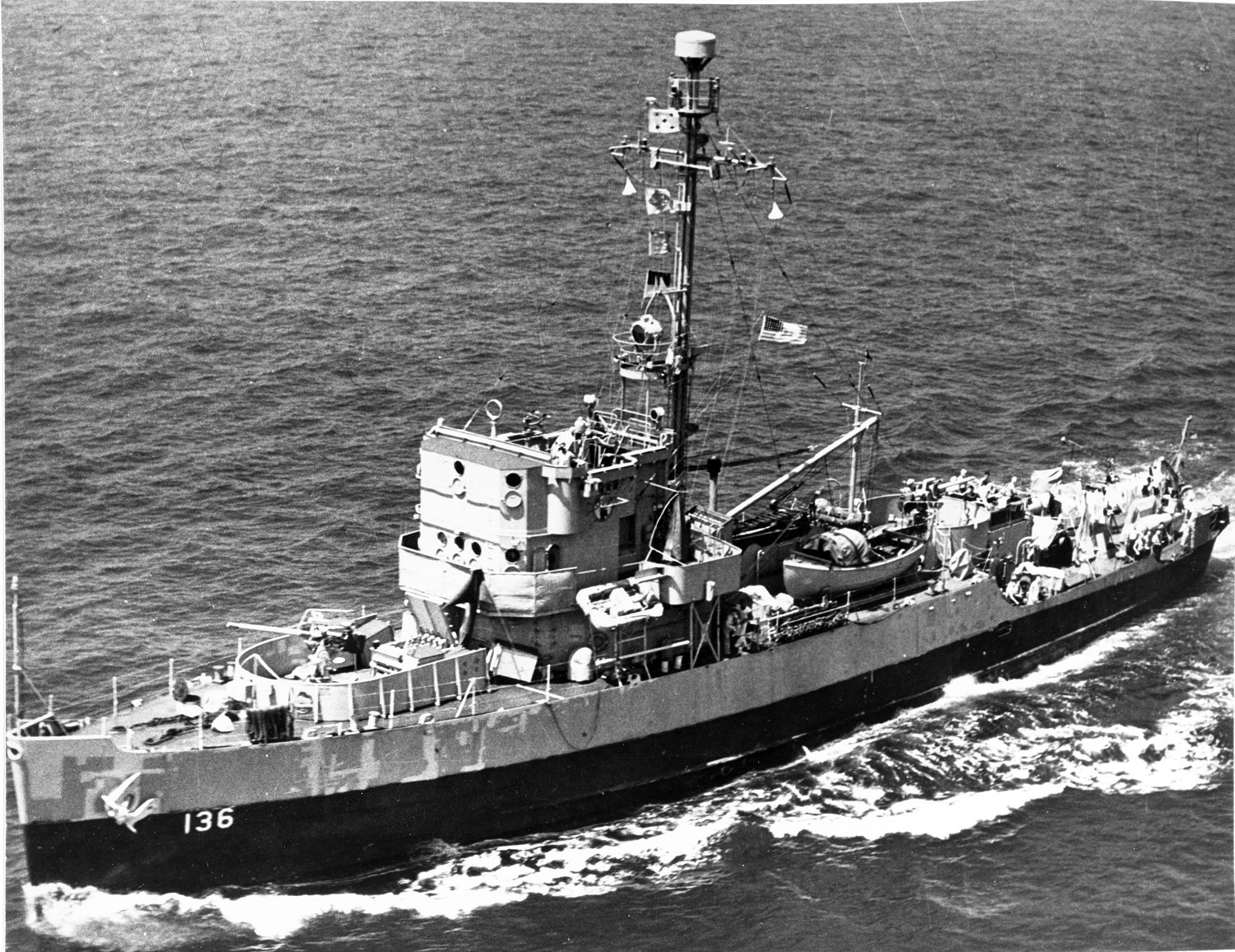
The minesweeper USS Admirable (AM-136) was transferred at Cold Bay, on 19 July 1945, becoming T-331 in the Soviet Navy.

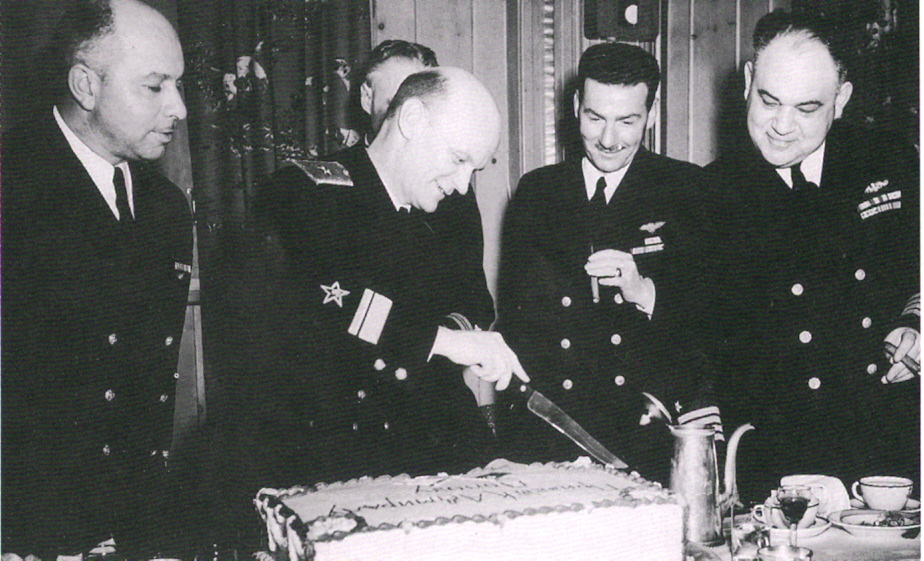
Rear Admiral Boris Dmitrievich Popov, commander of the 5th Independent Brigade of Soviet Navy Ships at Cold Bay, cuts a cake while his counterpart, Captain William S. Maxwell (right), commanding officer of U.S. Navy Detachment 3294, at Cold Bay, and overall commander of Project Hula, and members of their staffs look on during a party in Popov's honor on Memorial Day, 30 May 1945, probably at Dutch Harbor.

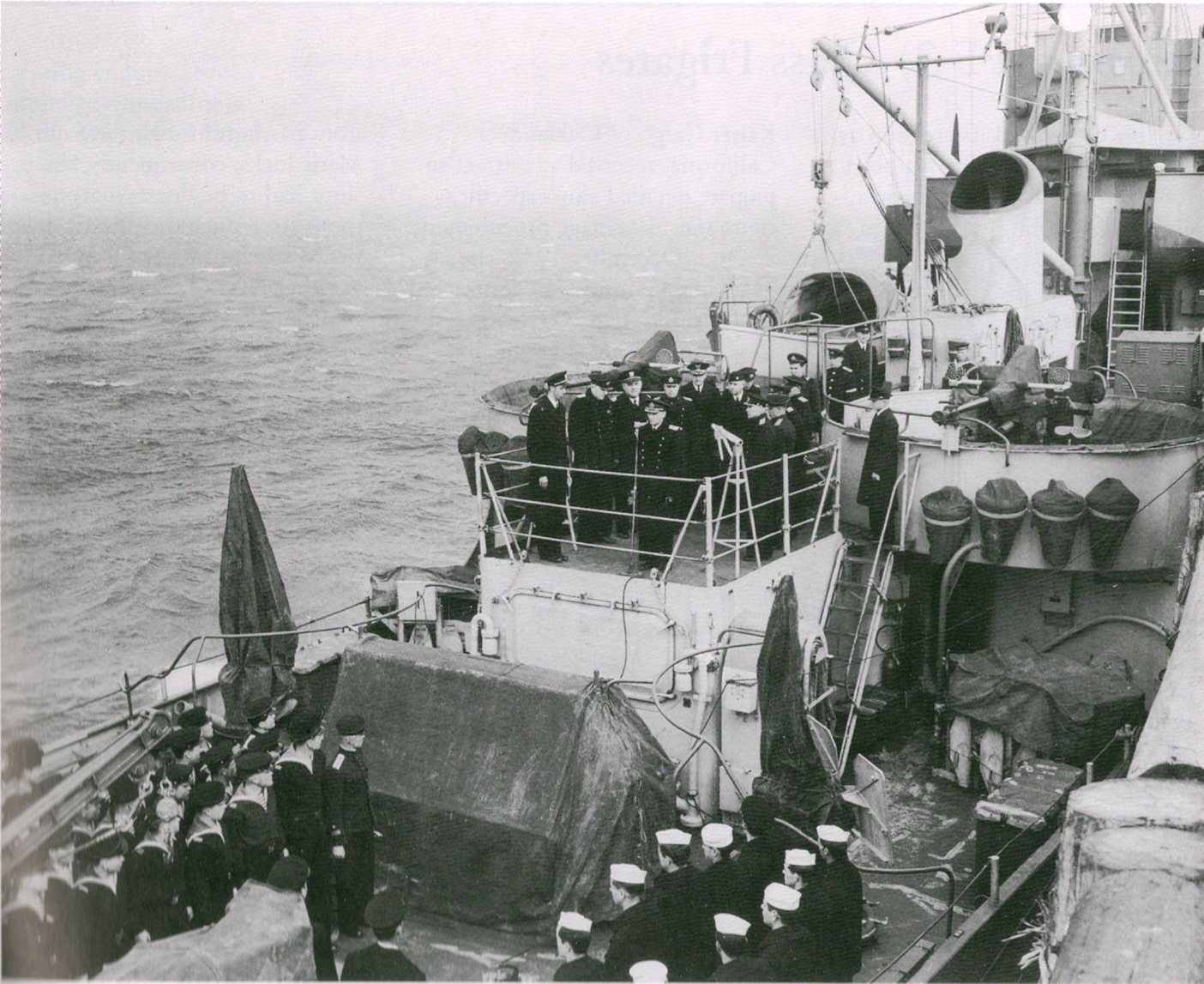
Rear Admiral Popov speaks aboard an Admirable-class minesweeper during the ship's transfer ceremony, probably on 21 or 22 May 1945.

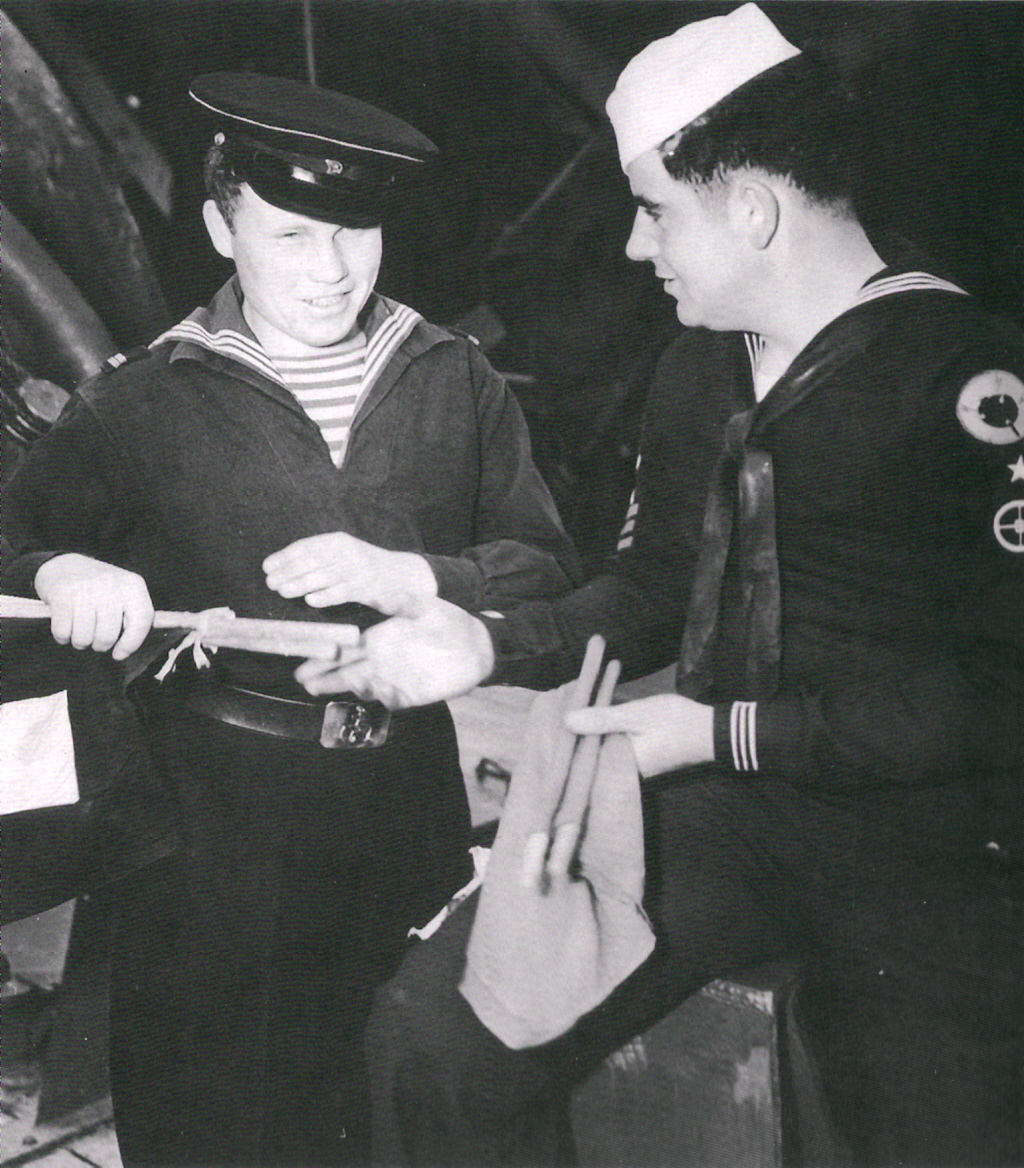
A Soviet Navy signalman (left) receives training from a U.S. Navy signalman at Cold Bay in 1945.

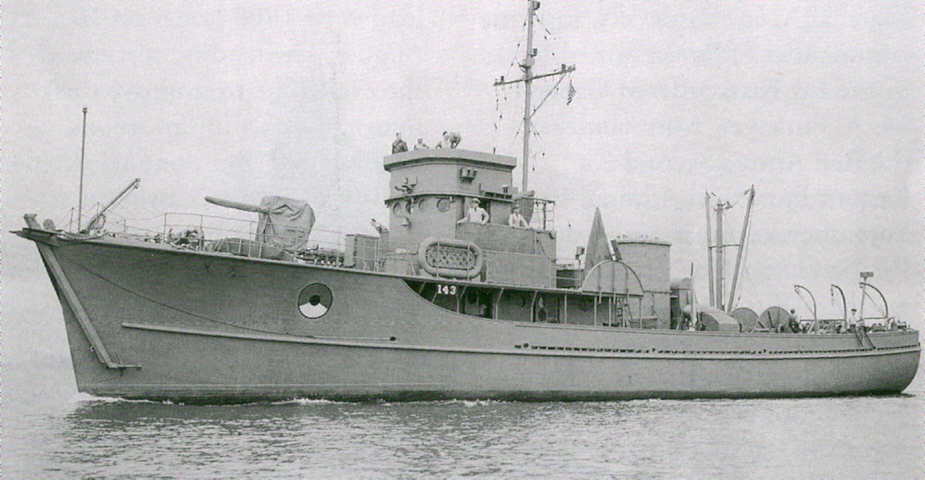
The U.S. Navy auxiliary motor minesweeper USS YMS-143 when new in February 1943. Transferred at Cold Bay, on 17 May 1945, she became T-522 and took part in the Soviet conquest of the Japanese province of Karafuto on southern Sakhalin Island between 11 and 25 August 1945. T-522 served in the Soviet Navy until stricken in July 1956, and dismantled for spare parts.

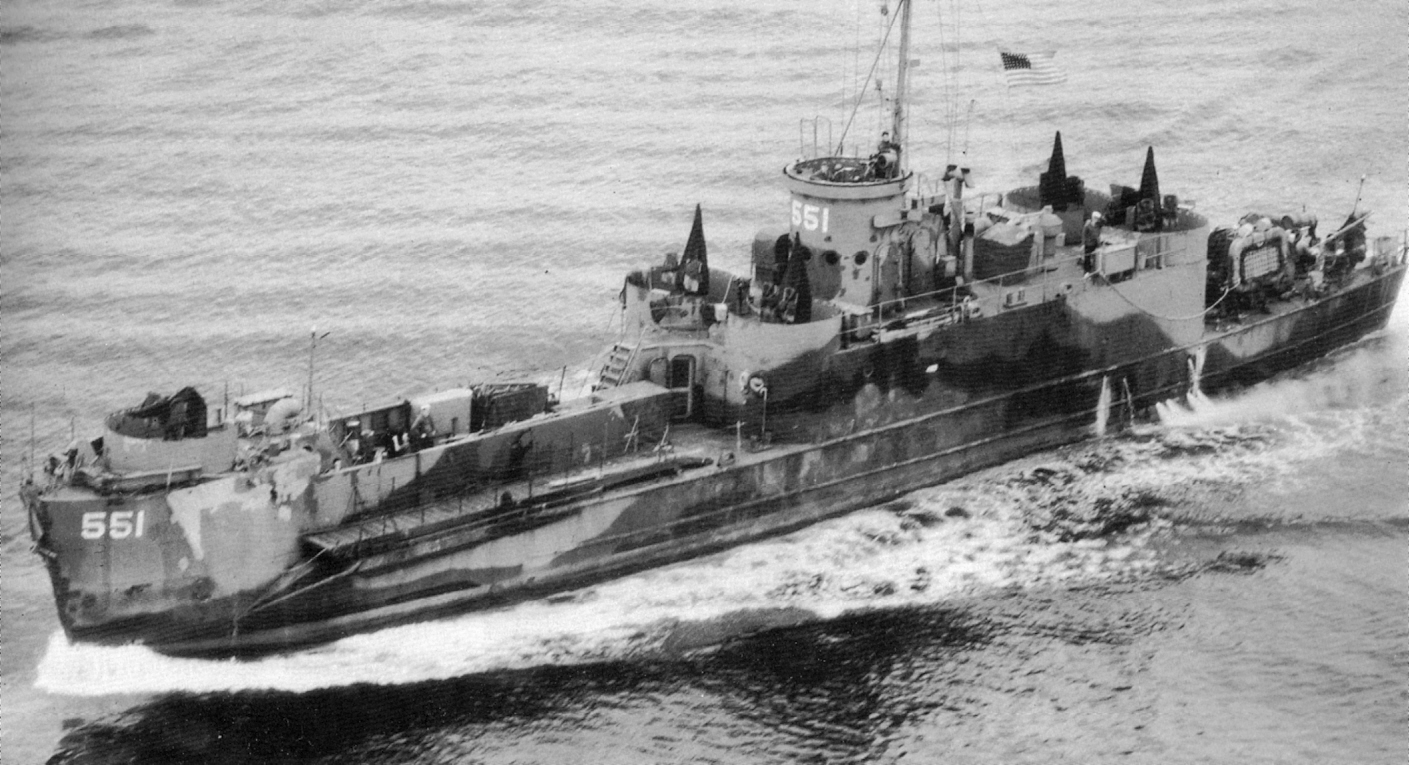
The large infantry landing craft USS LCI(L)-551 in May 1945, flying her colors at half-mast in honor of the recently deceased President Franklin D. Roosevelt. Transferred to the Soviet Navy at Cold Bay, on 29 July 1945, she became DS-48 and took part in the Soviet invasion of the Kuril Islands. The Soviet Union returned her to the United States in 1955.

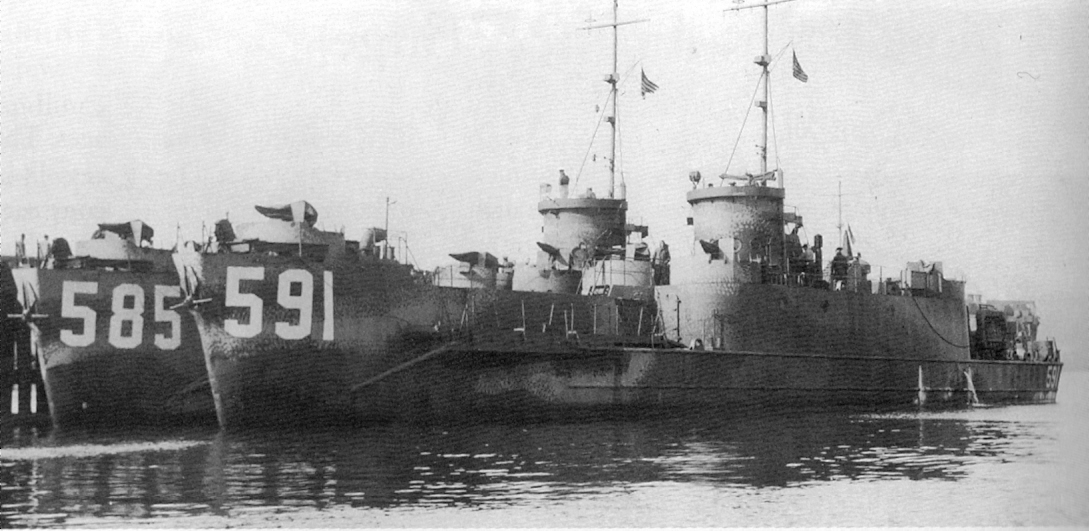
The large infantry landing craft USS LCI(L)-585 and USS LCI(L)-591 at Cold Bay, in the spring of 1945, awaiting transfer to the Soviet Navy, in which they became DS-45 and DS-35, respectively. The Soviets returned LCI(L)-585 to the United States, in 1955; DS-35 was sold for scrap in the Soviet Union.

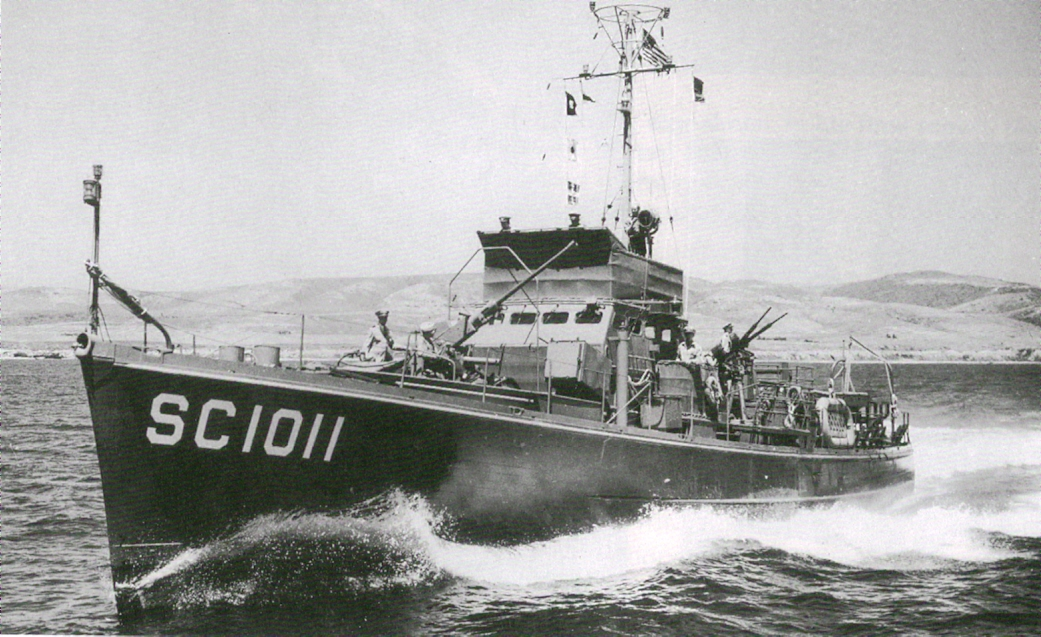
The submarine chaser USS SC-1011 off Terminal Island, California, in July 1943. Transferred at Cold Bay, on 17 August 1945, she served as BO-327 in the Soviet Navy until stricken in 1955.

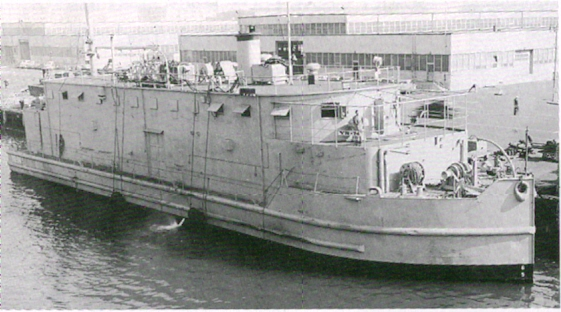
The floating workshop USS YR-74 was not among the Project Hula ships, but the United States transferred four YRs identical to her at Cold Bay in the summer of 1945.

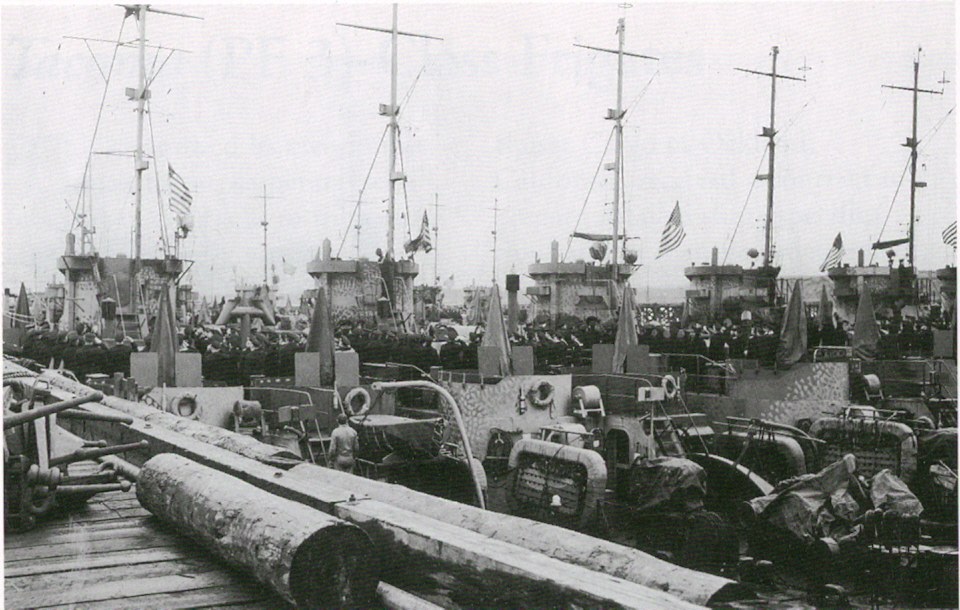
The U.S. flag is lowered aboard LCI(L)s as the U.S. Navy decommissions them for immediate transfer to the Soviet Union, at Cold Bay, on 9 June 1945.

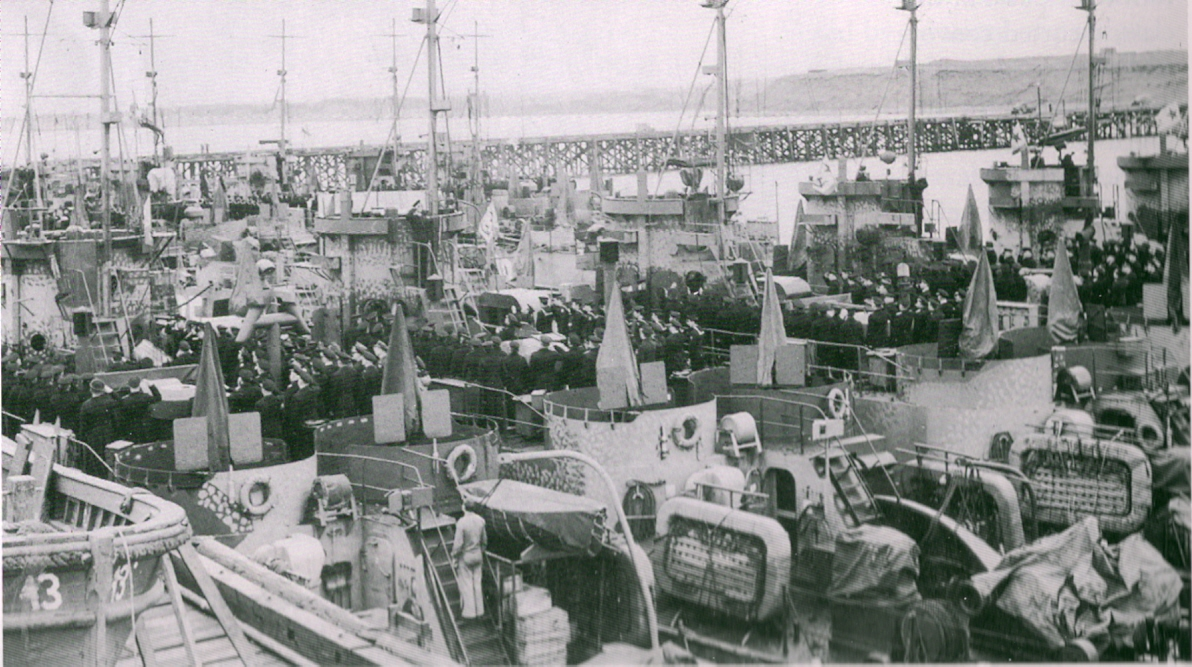
The Soviet naval ensign is raised aboard the LCI(L)s at Cold Bay, as they are commissioned into the Soviet Navy, immediately after their transfer on 9 June 1945. Redesignated desantiye suda (DS) or "landing ship," these craft saw action against Japanese forces during the Soviet campaign in northern Korea in August–September 1945.

King officially established the transfer-and-training program as Project Hula in mid-February 1945 and ordered Fletcher to commence the rehabilitation of the United States Army facilities at Cold Bay's Fort Randall, which had been closed in November 1944. He advised Fletcher that an officer appointed to take charge of the training and his staff would arrive at Cold Bay by 24 March 1945, and that the first 2,500 Soviet trainees would arrive by 1 April 1945, with 550 more to follow by 1 May and another 2,000 by 1 June.

An early issue to resolve was the matter of how to transport the Soviet Navy personnel to Cold Bay. At the Yalta Conference in February 1945, Kuznetsov initially proposed that Allied merchant ships returning to North America after delivering cargoes in Europe transport Soviet personnel to the United States East Coast, from which the Soviets could travel across the continental United States to the United States West Coast and then by ship to Cold Bay; however, a shortage of Allied shipping in the Pacific made this plan highly problematic. The day after the conference, the Deputy Chairman of the Soviet Government Purchasing Commission, Admiral A. A. Yakimov, proposed that the United States transfer three Liberty ships or similar vessels to Soviet registry, and that these ships carry Soviet personnel to Cold Bay, presumably from ports in the Soviet Far East, but the Allied shipping shortage blocked this idea as well. On 24 February 1945, the Deputy Commander-in-Chief of the U.S. Navy, Vice Admiral Richard S. Edwards, informed Yakimov that transferred motor torpedo boats and two disassembled self-propelled pontoon barges would be shipped aboard Soviet merchant ships from the U.S. West Coast directly to the Soviet Far East without calling at Cold Bay, reducing the demand on shipping by Soviet personnel requiring transportation to Cold Bay. The Soviets finally decided to transport their personnel to Cold Bay in their own merchant ships while the ships were making their regular voyages to carry Lend-Lease materials from the U.S. West Coast to the Soviet Far East, with each ship carrying about 600 men at a time.

As the plan was finalized, the United States was to transfer 180 ships – 30 Tacoma-class patrol frigates (U.S. Navy hull classification symbol PF), 24 Admirable-class minesweepers (AM), 36 auxiliary motor minesweepers (YMS), 30 large infantry landing craft (LCI(L)), 56 submarine chasers (SC), and four floating workshops (YR) – to the Soviet Union, by 1 November 1945, training about 15,000 Soviet Navy personnel to operate them. After their commissioning into the Soviet Navy, which would take place at Cold Bay simultaneously with their transfer, the ships would steam in a series of convoys from Cold Bay with a U.S. Navy escort, passing through Unimak Pass, regarded as the safest pass in the Aleutian Islands, and then moving westward along the northern side of the Aleutian Islands, with smaller vessels which could not make the voyage nonstop – the auxiliary motor minesweepers and submarine chasers – pausing at Adak, to refuel and reprovision. Northwest of Attu, the U.S. Navy escort would turn the convoy over to a Soviet Navy escort, and each convoy would then steam north of the Commander Islands to Petropavlovsk-Kamchatsky, from which the transferred ships would disperse to their designated home ports.

The Soviets planned for the first Soviet personnel to arrive at Cold Bay, aboard five merchant ships in late March or early April 1945, depending on ice conditions in the Soviet Far East. The first ship would carry a staff of 23 headed by a rear admiral, three substaffs (out of a planned five) of 11 to 17 personnel each, and 45 to 50 interpreters. Upon disembarking at Cold Bay, Soviet personnel were to come under the overall command of the American officer commanding the training-and-transfer program and were under orders to accede to American orders without question while at Cold Bay.

== Project Hula begins ==
The U.S. Navy created Naval Detachment No. 3294 specifically for Project Hula; it was to be responsible for all training and transfer activities at Cold Bay. On 7 March 1945, it assigned Commander William S. Maxwell, then in Washington, D.C., to command the detachment. Before leaving Washington, Maxwell recommended an increase in the number of Russian-language translators to be assigned to Cold Bay and urged that the U.S. Navy Bureau of Ships ensure that each ship to be transferred had all of its authorized equipment loaded and installed and no equipment not authorized for transfer aboard before arriving at Cold Bay. He then left for Cold Bay.

Arriving at Cold Bay on 19 March 1945, and newly promoted to captain, Maxwell took command of the naval base there the following day. Under his command were 694 U.S. Navy and United States Coast Guard personnel, 47 United States Marines, and a U.S. Army contingent of 605; his personnel strength soon stabilized at around 1,500 as Army personnel transferred out and naval personnel replaced them. He found that an advance party under his second-in-command, U.S. Coast Guard Lieutenant Commander John J. Hutson, had already established Detachment 3294's Antisubmarine Warfare Department. He also discovered that the naval facilities required more rehabilitation than he had been led to believe, so he moved his command into Fort Randall, which had been closed since November 1944, and set about readying its facilities to support Project Hula, including the establishment of housing, classrooms, movie theaters, a radio station, and a softball field; the selection of instructors for courses in radio and radar operation, engineering, gunnery, minesweeping, damage control, and landing craft operation; and the procurement of radios, radars, minesweeping gear, gyrocompasses, engines, movie projectors, and training films and other educational tools.

The first Soviets to arrive at Cold Bay were members of the Soviet Purchasing Commission, who disembarked at the base on 23 March 1945. Maxwell believed that a great deal of classroom training would be necessary before the Soviet personnel began to train at sea, but the Soviet officers disagreed, preferring a greater emphasis on training at sea. They worked for a week on a training program that both sides could agree on, and achieved a successful compromise before the first trainees arrived.

The first Soviet trainees reached Cold Bay aboard five Soviet merchant ships, each carrying nearly 500 Soviet trainees, that arrived one per day each day from 10 to 14 April 1945, by which time 2,358 Soviet personnel of what were to become the Soviet Navy's 16th Minesweeper Division and 2nd Submarine Chaser Division had disembarked, joining 1,350 American personnel. Rear Admiral Boris Dimitrievich Popov arrived on 11 April aboard the steamer Sevastopol and took command of Soviet personnel at Cold Bay, who the Soviet Navy designated the 5th Independent Detachment of Soviet Navy Ships.

== Training and transfers ==
The first 220 Soviet officers and 1,895 enlisted men began training at Cold Bay on 16 April 1945, divided by ship type and then further divided by individual ship assignment. Although the Soviet personnel took their training very seriously, an immediate challenge for the American instructors was the Soviets' complete lack of familiarity with radar, sonar, and the ships' propulsion plants, in addition to a lack of Russian-language training manuals. Personnel of the Soviet Purchasing Commission and 5th Independent Detachment remedied this by producing Russian-language manuals for use in Project Hula.

Material issues also arose in relation to the ships themselves. The Bureau of Ships had not heeded Maxwell's request to ensure that all ships to be transferred arrived properly equipped, and early in the program every ship arrived at Cold Bay without all authorized equipment or with unauthorized equipment still installed. A great deal of required equipment had to be flown into Fort Randall Army Airfield daily, and some ships had to undergo on-the-spot revisions to their authorized equipment lists. A further difficulty was damage to the wooden-hulled ships – the auxiliary motor minesweepers (YMS) and submarine chasers – in the rough seas in the training area. The closest repair facilities for these ships was nearly 200 nautical miles (370 km; 230 mi) away at Dutch Harbor, and an auxiliary motor minesweeper and nine submarine chasers had to visit Dutch Harbor for major repairs, delaying the submarine chaser program by eight days.

Despite these difficulties, the first convoy of transferred ships – three minesweepers and five auxiliary motor minesweepers – departed Cold Bay for the Soviet Union on 28 May 1945; the second – of three minesweepers and six submarine chasers – departed on 30 May, with one of its submarine chasers dropping out at Adak, for repairs, and the third, made up of three minesweepers and seven submarine chasers, left on 7 June 1945. However, poor repair work and supply problems in Seattle plagued the submarine chaser program, and Maxwell was forced to arrange for submarine chasers assigned to duty in the U.S. Navy's 13th Naval District to substitute for some of those originally scheduled for transfer in order to meet a deadline of having all ships transferred by 1 October 1945.

Training 100 Soviet officers and 800 enlisted men for the transfer of 30 large infantry landing craft (LCI(L)) in two training cycles began on 7 May 1945 and proved to be the most successful of the Project Hula training programs. The first cycle lasted 15 days, and experience gained in it allowed the second cycle to be cut to nine days. The fourth convoy to depart Cold Bay, consisting of four LCI(L)s, two minesweepers, and six submarine chasers, which left on 11 June 1945, was the first to include LCI(L)s, and all Soviet LCI(L) crews departed for the Soviet Union aboard their ships before the end of July 1945.

The 30 Tacoma-class patrol frigates were the largest, most heavily armed, and most expensive ships scheduled for transfer in Project Hula. The first 572 officers and men of the Soviet Navy's 10th Frigate Division arrived at Cold Bay on 12 June 1945 aboard the Soviet steamer Felix Dzerzhinski and began training to take over the patrol frigates on 14 June, the same day that the first nine patrol frigates – USS Charlottesville (PF-25), USS Long Beach (PF-34), USS Belfast (PF-35), USS Glendale (PF-36), USS San Pedro (PF-37), USS Coronado (PF-38), USS Allentown (PF-52), USS Machias (PF-53), and USS Sandusky (PF-54) – arrived at Cold Bay. Another 570 personnel of the 10th Frigate Division arrived on 15 June 1945 aboard the Soviet steamer Chaikovskii. The first nine patrol frigates to arrive, plus USS Ogden (PF-39), which arrived at Cold Bay on 27 June 1945, made up the first group of 10 frigates transferred to the Soviets on 12 July 1945; they departed Cold Bay in convoy on 15 July 1945.

The four floating workshops (YR) slated for transfer were all taken under tow by Soviet merchant ships calling at Cold Bay on their way from the U.S. West Coast to the Soviet Far East during the summer of 1945.

Relations between Soviet and American personnel at Cold Bay remained amicable and cooperative throughout the life of the project. The best-performing Soviet trainees were retained at Cold Bay to serve alongside the American instructors in training other Soviet personnel who arrived later. By 31 July 1945, Project Hula had transferred 100 of the planned 180 vessels to the Soviet Union.

== Soviet Union declares war ==
As Stalin had promised, the Soviet Union declared war against Japan on 8 August 1945, exactly three months after the capitulation of Germany, and began an offensive against Japanese forces in Northeast Asia the next day. Although an armistice halted combat between the other Allies and Japan on 15 August 1945 (14 August on the other side of the International Date Line in Cold Bay) and Japan formally surrendered to the Allies aboard the battleship USS Missouri (BB-63) in Tokyo Bay on 2 September 1945, Soviet offensive operations continued until 5 September 1945, by which time Soviet forces had overrun the Japanese puppet state of Manchukuo in Manchuria, the northern half of Korea, the Japanese province of Karafuto on the southern half of Sakhalin Island, and the Kuril Islands. Despite the Soviet Union's now-overt participation in the war, Project Hula remained secret and subject to strict censorship.

The Soviet entry into the war seemed if anything to make Soviet-American cooperation at Cold Bay even better than before, and Maxwell and Popov, worked to accelerate training and transfers to get ships into Soviet hands as quickly as possible in support of the Soviet offensive. Previously trained Soviet personnel returned to Cold Bay to serve as nucleus crews for newly transferred ships, and the training of their fellow crewmen was cut to the minimum necessary for the Soviet crews to take their vessels home. On 25 August 1945, Navy Detachment 3294 completed the final cycle of classroom training for Soviet personnel.

At Cold Bay on the day of Japan's surrender, 2 September 1945, the Soviet Navy took control of the patrol frigates USS Bayonne (PF-21) and USS Poughkeepsie (PF-26). On 4 September 1945, the last four ships to be transferred in Project Hula – the patrol frigates USS Gloucester (PF-22), USS Newport (PF-27), USS Bath (PF-55), and USS Evansville (PF-70) – were commissioned into the Soviet Navy at Cold Bay.

== Project Hula concludes ==
On 5 September 1945, a few hours after Soviet forces completed their occupation of the Kuril Islands, Maxwell received orders to cease transfers of ships other than those for which Soviet crews already were in training; this cancelled the transfer of two patrol frigates, five auxiliary motor minesweepers, and 24 submarine chasers. The stop-transfer order caught some of the ships scheduled for transfer, including the patrol frigates USS Annapolis (PF-15) and USS Bangor (PF-16), while they were at sea bound from the U.S. West Coast to Cold Bay. The other ships turned back, but Annapolis and Bangor pressed on to Cold Bay, took aboard American personnel requiring transportation to the continental United States, and steamed back to Seattle.

At Cold Bay, Soviet and American personnel set about the business of shutting down Project Hula. The last four patrol frigates transferred remained at Cold Bay for additional training and shakedown before departing for the Soviet Union in the final Project Hula convoy on 17 September 1945. The remaining personnel of the Soviet Navy's 5th Independent Detachment – Popov, his staff, and the partially trained crews of the 31 ships no longer scheduled for transfer – departed Cold Bay for the Soviet Union aboard the Soviet steamer Carl Schurz on 27 September 1945. Maxwell decommissioned the base at Cold Bay on 30 September 1945.

== Training and transfer results ==
Project Hula was "the largest and most ambitious transfer program of World War II." During the 142 days between the commencement of training activities at Cold Bay on 16 April 1945 and the transfer of the last four ships there on 4 September 1945, U.S. Navy Detachment 3294 trained some 12,000 Soviet Navy personnel – about 750 officers and 11,250 enlisted men – and transferred 149 ships and craft – 28 patrol frigates (PF), 24 minesweepers (AM), 30 large infantry landing craft (LCI(L)), 31 auxiliary motor minesweepers (YMS), 32 submarine chasers (SC), and four floating workshops (YR) – at Cold Bay.

In Soviet service, the patrol frigates were redesignated storozhevoi korabl ("escort vessel") and received the designation "EK"; minesweepers and auxiliary motor minesweepers were redesignated tralshik ("minesweeper") and received the designation "T"; large infantry landing craft were redesignated desantiye suda ("landing ship") and received the designation "DS"; and submarine chasers were redesignated bolshiye okhotniki za podvodnimi lodkami ("large submarine hunter"), and received the designation "BO". None of the ships received names in Soviet service.

Popov, reported to Maxwell at Cold Bay in late August 1945 that LCI(L)s transferred under Project Hula played an important role in the Soviet assault on the Kuril Islands just ten days after arriving at Petropavlovsk-Kamchatsky, and that other Project Hula ships had taken part in Soviet operations against the Japanese in northern Korea and on southern Sakhalin Island. He did not mention losses. Five ships transferred in Project Hula, all former LCI(L)s – DS-1 (ex-USS LCI(L)-672), DS-5 (ex-USS LCI(L)-525), DS-9 (ex-USS LCI(L)-554), DS-43 (ex-USS LCI(L)-943), and DS-47 (ex-USS LCI(L)-671) – were lost in combat during the operations, all of them sunk by Japanese coastal artillery on 18 August 1945 during the Soviet landings on Shumshu.

The transfer dates for ships under Project Hula follow. The U.S. Navy decommissioned each ship on the day of transfer and the Soviet Navy simultaneously commissioned it. Each ship is identified by its U.S. Navy name and designation, followed by its Soviet Navy designation. (Note: All information from Russell 1997, pp. 34, 35, 39–40. Russell's table on page 39 places the final transfer date of patrol frigates on 9 September 1945, but this contradicts the text on pages 34–35 placing it on 4 September 1945 and stating that transfers were ordered to halt as of 5 September 1945.) Not included are the four floating workshops (YRs), which were transferred to the Soviet Union in the summer of 1945.

17 May 1945

- Auxiliary motor minesweepers (YMS): USS YMS-143 (T-522), USS YMS-144 (T-523), USS YMS-428 (T-525), USS YMS-435 (T-526)

21 May 1945

- Minesweepers (AM): USS Fancy (AM-234) (T-272), USS Marvel (AM-262) (T-274), USS Measure (AM-263) (T-275), USS Method (AM-264) (T-276), USS Mirth (AM-265) (T-277), USS Nucleus (AM-268) (T-277), USS Rampart (AM-282) (T-278)

22 May 1945

- Minesweepers: USS Disdain (AM-222) (T-271), USS Indicative (AM-250) (T-273), USS Palisade (AM-270) (T-279), USS Penetrate (AM-271) (T-280), USS Peril (AM-272) (T-281)
- Auxiliary motor minesweeper (YMS): USS YMS-145 (T-524)

26 May 1945

- Submarine chasers (SC): USS SC-537 (BO-304), USS SC-646 (probably BO-310), USS SC-647 (BO-308), USS SC-661 (BO-303), USS SC-674 (BO-306), USS SC-687 (BO-301)

5 June 1945

- Submarine chasers (SC): USS SC-657 (BO-307), USS SC-660 (BO-311), USS SC-663 (BO-318), USS SC-673 (BO-316), USS SC-713 (BO-313), USS SC-986 (BO-305), USS SC-1021 (BO-312), USS SC-1060 (BO-317)

6 June 1945

- Auxiliary motor minesweeper (YMS): USS YMS-59 (T-521)

10 June 1945

- Large infantry landing craft (LCI(L)): USS LCI(L)-584 (DS-38), USS LCI(L)-585 (DS-45), USS LCI(L)-590 (DS-34), USS LCI(L)-591 (DS-35), USS LCI(L)-592 (DS-39), USS LCI(L)-593 (DS-31), USS LCI(L)-665 (DS-36), USS LCI(L)-667 (DS-40), USS LCI(L)-668 (DS-41), USS LCI(L)-675 (DS-42), USS LCI(L)-943 (DS-43), USS LCI(L)-949 (DS-44), USS LCI(L)-950 (DS-32)
- Submarine chasers (SC): USS SC-500 (BO-319), USS SC-634 (BO-309), USS SC-675 (BO-314), USS SC-1295 (BO-320), USS SC-1324 (BO-315)

14 June 1945

- Large infantry landing craft (LCI(L)): USS LCI(L)-586 (DS-37), USS LCI(L)-587 (DS-33)

12 July 1945

- Patrol frigates (PF): USS Charlottesville (PF-25) (EK-1), USS Long Beach (PF-34) (EK-2), USS Belfast (PF-35) (EK-3), USS Glendale (PF-36) (EK-6), USS San Pedro (PF-37) (EK-5), USS Coronado (PF-38) (EK-8), USS Ogden (PF-39) (EK-10), USS Allentown (PF-52) (EK-9), USS Machias (PF-53) (EK-4), USS Sandusky (PF-54) (EK-7)

19 July 1945

- Minesweepers (AM): USS Admirable (AM-136) (T-331), USS Adopt (AM-137) (T-332), USS Astute (AM-148) (T-333), USS Augury (AM-149) (T-334), USS Barrier (AM-150) (T-335), USS Bombard (AM-151) (T-336)
- Auxiliary motor minesweepers (YMS): USS YMS-38 (T-593), USS YMS-42 (T-592), USS YMS-75 (T-590), USS YMS-139 (T-594), USS YMS-178 (T-588), USS YMS-184 (T-595), USS YMS-216 (T-596), USS YMS-237 (T-589), USS YMS-241 (T-591), USS YMS-272 (T-597), USS YMS-273 (T-598), USS YMS-295 (T-599)
- Submarine chaser (SC): USS SC-685 (BO-302)

29 July 1945

- Large infantry landing craft (LCI(L)): USS LCI(L)-521 (DS-8), USS LCI(L)-522 (DS-2), USS LCI(L)-523 (DS-3), USS LCI(L)-524 (DS-4), USS LCI(L)-525 (DS-5), USS LCI(L)-526 (DS-46), USS LCI(L)-527 (probably DS-7), USS LCI(L)-551 (DS-48), USS LCI(L)-554 (DS-9), USS LCI(L)-557 (DS-10), USS LCI(L)-666 (DS-50), USS LCI(L)-671 (DS-47), USS LCI(L)-672 (DS-1), USS LCI(L)-945 (DS-6), USS LCI(L)-946 (DS-49)

2 August

- Auxiliary motor minesweeper (YMS): USS YMS-260 (T-527)

16 August 1945

- Patrol frigates (PF): USS Tacoma (PF-3) (EK-11), USS Sausalito (PF-4) (EK-16), USS Hoquiam (PF-5)(EK-13), USS Pasco (PF-6) (EK-12), USS Albuquerque (PF-7) (EK-14), USS Everett (PF-8) (EK-15)

17 August 1945

- Minesweepers: USS Bond (AM-152) (T-285), USS Candid (AM-154) (T-283), USS Capable (AM-155) (T-339), USS Captivate (AM-156) (T-338), USS Caravan (AM-157) (T-337), USS Caution (AM-158) (T-284)
- Auxiliary motor minesweepers (YMS): USS YMS-33 (T-603), USS YMS-85 (T-604), USS YMS-100 (T-602), USS YMS-266 (T-601), USS YMS-288 (T-600), USS YMS-301 (T-605)
- Submarine chasers (SC): USS SC-538 (BO-321), USS SC-643 (BO-322), USS SC-752 (BO-325), USS SC-754 (BO-324), USS SC-774 (BO-323), USS SC-997 (BO-326), USS SC-1007 (BO-332), USS SC-1011 (BO-327), USS SC-1031 (BO-328), USS SC-1364 (BO-331), USS SC-1365 (BO-329)

26 August 1945

- Patrol frigates (PF): USS Bisbee (PF-46) (EK-17), USS Gallup (PF-47) (EK-22), USS Rockford (PF-48) (EK-18), USS Muskogee (PF-49) (EK-19), USS Carson City (PF-50) (EK-20), USS Burlington (PF-51) (EK-21)

27 August 1945

- Auxiliary motor minesweepers (YMS): USS YMS-88 (T-608), USS YMS-180 (T-609), USS YMS-135 (T-606), USS YMS-332 (T-607), USS YMS-285 (T-610)

2 September 1945

- Patrol frigates (PF): USS Bayonne (PF-21) (EK-25), USS Poughkeepsie (PF-26) (EK-27)
- Submarine chaser (SC): USS SC-756 (BO-335)

3 September 1945

- Auxiliary motor minesweeper (YMS): USS YMS-287 (T-611)

4 September 1945

- Patrol frigates (PF): USS Gloucester (PF-22) (EK-26), USS Newport (PF-27) (EK-28), USS Bath (PF-55) (EK-29), USS Evansville (PF-70) (EK-30)

== Aftermath ==
Under U.S. law, all ships transferred to foreign countries under Lend-Lease had to be returned to U.S. custody after the conclusion of World War II, and in February 1946 the United States began negotiations with the Soviet Union for the return of transferred ships. However, relations between the Soviet Union and the Western Allies deteriorated rapidly after the end of World War II as the Cold War began, hindering the return of ships.

Subtracting the five former LCI(L)s lost in combat and an auxiliary motor minesweeper that sank in 1945, 143 Project Hula ships were subject to return to the United States. On 7 March 1947, United States Secretary of the Navy James V. Forrestal, presented the United States Department of State with a list of 480 warships that the United States Department of the Navy wanted the Soviet Union to return, including all 28 patrol frigates transferred under Project Hula. In 1948, the Soviet Union finally agreed to return the patrol frigates, and it handed over 27 of them in October and November 1949; the 28th, EK-3, ex-USS Belfast (PF-35), had been driven aground and nearly sunk in a storm off Petropavlovsk-Kamchatsky on 17 November 1948, was beyond economical repair, and was never returned, instead being scrapped in the Soviet Union in 1960. Negotiations over the Department of the Navy's other major focus, the 25 surviving former LCI(L)s, dragged on longer, but in the end the Soviets returned 15 of them to the United States in 1955. By 1957, the U.S. Office of Naval Intelligence reported that of the 149 Project Hula ships, only 18 of those still in Soviet custody – nine minesweepers (AM), five submarine chasers (SC), and the four floating workshops (YR) – remained serviceable.

Ironically, the U.S. Navy actually did not want to take delivery of many of the Lend-Lease ships because they were no longer useful and would be expensive to take custody of and dispose of. As a result some ships underwent a merely administrative transfer to U.S. custody to meet the letter of the law and then were sold for scrap in the Soviet Union or destroyed in Soviet waters under the direct observation of American naval authorities. The Soviet Union transferred two auxiliary motor minesweepers to the People's Republic of China, but all of the other 97 Project Hula ships remaining in Soviet hands after the return of the 15 LCI(L)s in 1955 either were sold for scrap in the Soviet Union (81 ships) or destroyed off its coast (16 ships), presumably off Nakhodka.
