= USS Measure =

Minesweeper of the United States Navy

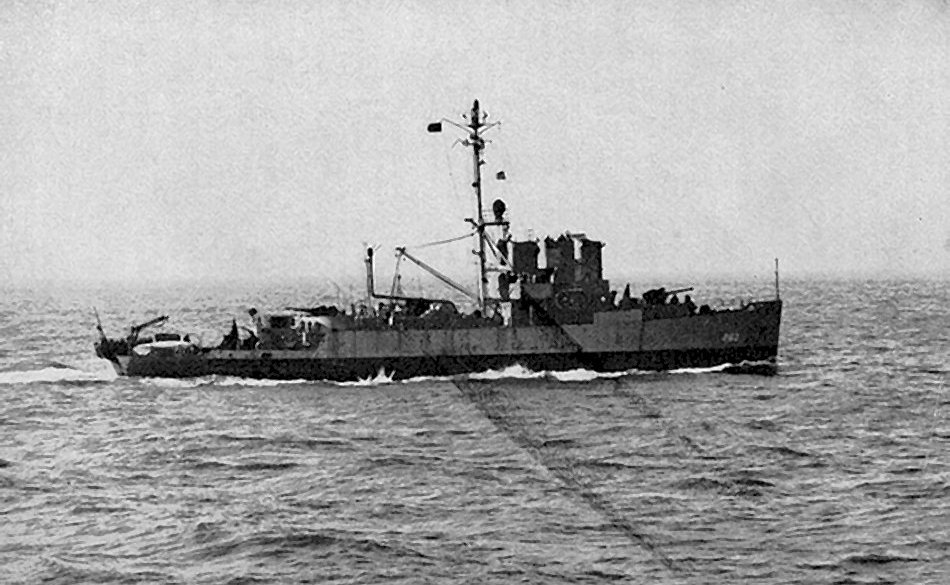
- USS Measure (AM-263) in 1944 or 1945.

History

United States
- Name: USS Measure (AM-263)
- Builder: American Ship Building Company, Lorain, Ohio
- Laid down: 5 June 1943
- Launched: 23 October 1943
- Sponsored by: Mrs. Richard W. Mills, Jr.
- Commissioned: 5 May 1944
- Decommissioned: 21 May 1945
- Fate: Transferred to Soviet Navy, 21 May 1945
- Reclassified: MSF-263, 7 February 1955
- Stricken: 1 January 1983

History

Soviet Union
- Name: T-275
- Acquired: 21 May 1945
- Commissioned: 21 May 1945
- Decommissioned: 23 October 1947
- Refit: Converted to civilian whaling ship
- Renamed: Buran ("Blizzard"), 1948
- Honors and awards: Order of the Red Banner, 14 September 1945
- Fate: Scrapped 1960

General characteristics
- Class & type: Admirable-class minesweeper
- Displacement: 650 tons
- Length: 184 ft 6 in (56.24 m)
- Beam: 33 ft (10 m)
- Draft: 9 ft 9 in (2.97 m)
- Propulsion: 2 × ALCO 539 diesel engines, 1,710 shp (1.3 MW); Farrel-Birmingham single reduction gear; 2 shafts
- Speed: 14.8 knots (27.4 km/h)
- Complement: 104
- Armament: 1 × 3"/50 caliber gun DP; 2 × twin Bofors 40 mm guns; 1 × Hedgehog anti-submarine mortar; 2 × depth charge tracks

Service record
- Part of: United States Atlantic Fleet (1944-1945); United States Pacific Fleet (1945); Soviet Pacific Ocean Fleet (1945-1947)

USS Measure (AM-263) was an Admirable-class minesweeper built for the United States Navy during World War II and in commission from 1944 to 1945. In 1945, she was transferred to the Soviet Union and served in the Soviet Navy from 1945 to 1947 as T-275. She later became the civilian whaling ship Buran ("Blizzard").

== Construction and commissioning ==
Measure was laid down at Lorain, Ohio, by the American Ship Building Company on 5 June 1943, launched on 23 October 1943, sponsored by Mrs. Richard W. Mills, Jr., and commissioned on 3 May 1944.

== Service history ==
=== U.S. Navy, World War II, 1944-1945 ===
After shakedown in the St. Lawrence River, Measure departed Cleveland, Ohio, on 21 May 1944 for a stop at Halifax, Nova Scotia, Canada, after which she proceeded to Boston, where she arrived on 2 June 1944. On 16 June 1944 she continued on to Little Creek, Virginia. arriving on 18 June 1944. Assigned to Mine Squadron 13, she spent most of the next month in minesweeping exercises in the Chesapeake Bay, then reported to Service Squadron 5 on 23 July 1944 for towing duty.

On 31 July 1944, Measure began operations as training and school ship out of Little Creek, continuing in this role into mid-December 1944. On 26 December 1944 she moved to Norfolk, Virginia, and on 3 January 1945 got underway for the United States West Coast via Miami, and the Panama Canal, arriving at San Diego, on 28 February 1945. Attached to the Western Sea Frontier, Measure steamed north on 1 March 1945, made a stopover at Seattle from 5 to 26 March 1945, and arrived at Kodiak, Territory of Alaska, on 31 March 1945 for minesweeping duty.

Selected for transfer to the Soviet Navy in Project Hula – a secret program for the transfer of U.S. Navy ships to the Soviet Navy at Cold Bay, Alaska, in anticipation of the Soviet Union joining the war against Japan – Measure arrived at Cold Bay in the spring of 1945 to begin familiarization training of her new Soviet crew.

=== Soviet Navy, 1945-1947 ===
Following the completion of training for her Soviet crew, Measure was decommissioned on 21 May 1945 at Cold Bay and transferred to the Soviet Union under Lend-Lease immediately. Also commissioned into the Soviet Navy immediately, she was designated as a tralshik ("minesweeper") and renamed T-275 in Soviet service. She soon departed Cold Bay bound for Petropavlovsk-Kamchatsky in the Soviet Union, where she served in the Soviet Far East.

During the Soviet offensive against Japan in August–September 1945, T-275 saw action against Japanese forces in the Soviet landings at Seishin, Korea, on 15 August 1945.

In February 1946, the United States began negotiations for the return of ships loaned to the Soviet Union for use during World War II, and on 8 May 1947, United States Secretary of the Navy James V. Forrestal informed the United States Department of State that the United States Department of the Navy wanted 480 of the 585 combatant ships it had transferred to the Soviet Union for World War II use returned. Deteriorating relations between the two countries as the Cold War broke out led to protracted negotiations over the ships, and by the mid-1950s the U.S. Navy found it too expensive to bring home ships that had become worthless to it anyway. Many ex-American ships were merely administratively "returned" to the United States and instead sold for scrap in the Soviet Union, while the U.S. Navy did not seriously pursue the return of others because it viewed them as no longer worth the cost of recovery. The Soviet Union never returned T-275 to the United States, instead decommissioning her on 23 October 1947, after which she was converted into a civilian whaling ship and renamed Buran ("Blizzard"). Unaware of her conversion or status, the U.S. Navy reclassified her as a "fleet minesweeper" (MSF) and redesignated her MSF-263 on 7 February 1955.

== Disposal ==
Buran was scrapped in 1960. Unaware of her fate, the U.S. Navy kept Measure on its Naval Vessel Register until finally striking her on 1 January 1983.

== Awards ==
The Soviet Union awarded T-275 the Order of the Red Banner on 14 September 1945 for her World War II service against Japanese forces in August–September 1945.
