= USS Palisade =

Minesweeper of the United States Navy

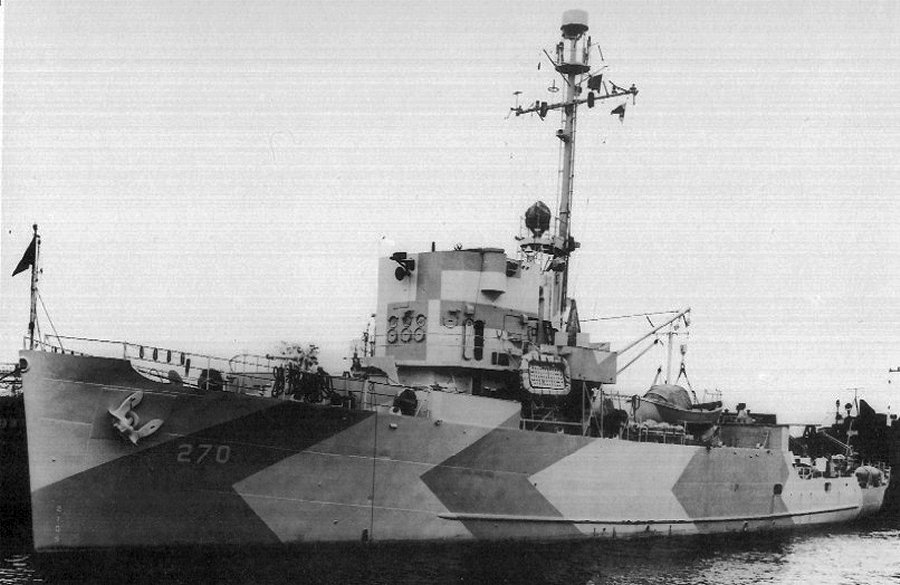
- USS Palisade (AM-270) at Norfolk Navy Yard in Portsmouth, Virginia, on 25 April 1944.

History

United States
- Name: USS Palisade
- Builder: Gulf Shipbuilding Corporation, Chickasaw, Alabama
- Laid down: 21 September 1942
- Launched: 26 June 1943
- Commissioned: 9 March 1944
- Decommissioned: 22 May 1945
- Fate: Transferred to Soviet Navy, 22 May 1945

History

Soviet Union
- Name: T-279
- Acquired: 22 May 1945
- Commissioned: 22 May 1945
- Stricken: 1957
- Fate: See note

General characteristics
- Class & type: Admirable-class minesweeper
- Displacement: 650 tons
- Length: 184 ft 6 in (56.24 m)
- Beam: 33 ft (10 m)
- Draft: 9 ft 9 in (2.97 m)
- Installed power: 1,710 shp (1.3 MW)
- Propulsion: 2 × ALCO 539 diesel engines; Farrel-Birmingham single reduction gear; 2 shafts
- Speed: 14.8 knots (27.4 km/h)
- Complement: 104
- Armament: 1 × 3"/50 caliber gun DP; 2 × twin Bofors 40 mm guns; 1 × Hedgehog anti-submarine mortar; 2 × Depth charge tracks

USS Palisade (AM-270) was an Admirable-class minesweeper built for the United States Navy during World War II and in commission from 1944 to 1945. In 1945 she was transferred to the Soviet Union and served in the Soviet Navy after that as T-279.

== Construction and commissioning ==
Palisade was laid down at Chickasaw, Alabama by the Gulf Shipbuilding Corporation on 21 September 1942. She was launched on 26 June 1943, sponsored by Mrs. W. C. Ellis, and commissioned on 9 March 1944.

== Service history ==
=== U.S. Navy, World War II, 1944-1945 ===
Following shakedown, Palisade conducted minesweeping operations at Naval Station Argentia in the Dominion of Newfoundland as part of Mine Squadron 33, then was fitted out as a temporary weather ship. She patrolled in the North Atlantic on weather reporting duties for the remainder of 1944 with occasional calls at United States East Coast ports. In January 1945 she was refitted with minesweeping equipment and, after overhaul in Philadelphia, Pennsylvania, deployed to the Panama Canal Zone on 27 February 1945.

Selected for transfer to the Soviet Navy in Project Hula – a secret program for the transfer of U.S. Navy ships to the Soviet Navy at Cold Bay, Territory of Alaska, in anticipation of the Soviet Union joining the war against Japan – Palisade transiting the Panama Canal on 8 March 1945 and proceeded to Seattle, Washington, where she prepared for transfer. With preparations complete, she departed Seattle on 7 April 1945 bound for Kodiak, Alaska, then proceeded from Kodiak to Cold Bay, where she begin familiarization training of her new Soviet crew.

=== Soviet Navy, 1945-1960 ===
Following the completion of training for her Soviet crew, Palisade was decommissioned on 22 May 1945 at Cold Bay and transferred to the Soviet Union under Lend-Lease immediately. Also commissioned into the Soviet Navy immediately, she was designated as a tralshik ("minesweeper") and renamed T-279 in Soviet service. She soon departed Cold Bay bound for Petropavlovsk-Kamchatsky in the Soviet Union, where she soon entered service with the Soviet Pacific Ocean Fleet.

In February 1946, the United States began negotiations for the return of ships loaned to the Soviet Union for use during World War II, and on 8 May 1947, United States Secretary of the Navy James V. Forrestal informed the United States Department of State that the United States Department of the Navy wanted 480 of the 585 combatant ships it had transferred to the Soviet Union for World War II use returned. Deteriorating relations between the two countries as the Cold War broke out led to protracted negotiations over the ships, and by the mid-1950s the U.S. Navy found it too expensive to bring home ships that had become worthless to it anyway. Many ex-American ships were merely administratively "returned" to the United States and instead sold for scrap in the Soviet Union, while the U.S. Navy did not seriously pursue the return of others – such as T-279 (ex-Palisade) – because it viewed them as no longer worth the cost of recovery.

== Disposal ==
The Soviet Union reported that T-279 has been sunk off Kham Island, Korea, on 14 or 15 August 1945, by a naval mine previously laid by American aircraft to target Japanese ships. However, post-Cold War research has found that the ship survived the war and was stricken by the Soviet Navy in 1957.
