= USS Capable (AM-155) =

Minesweeper of the United States Navy

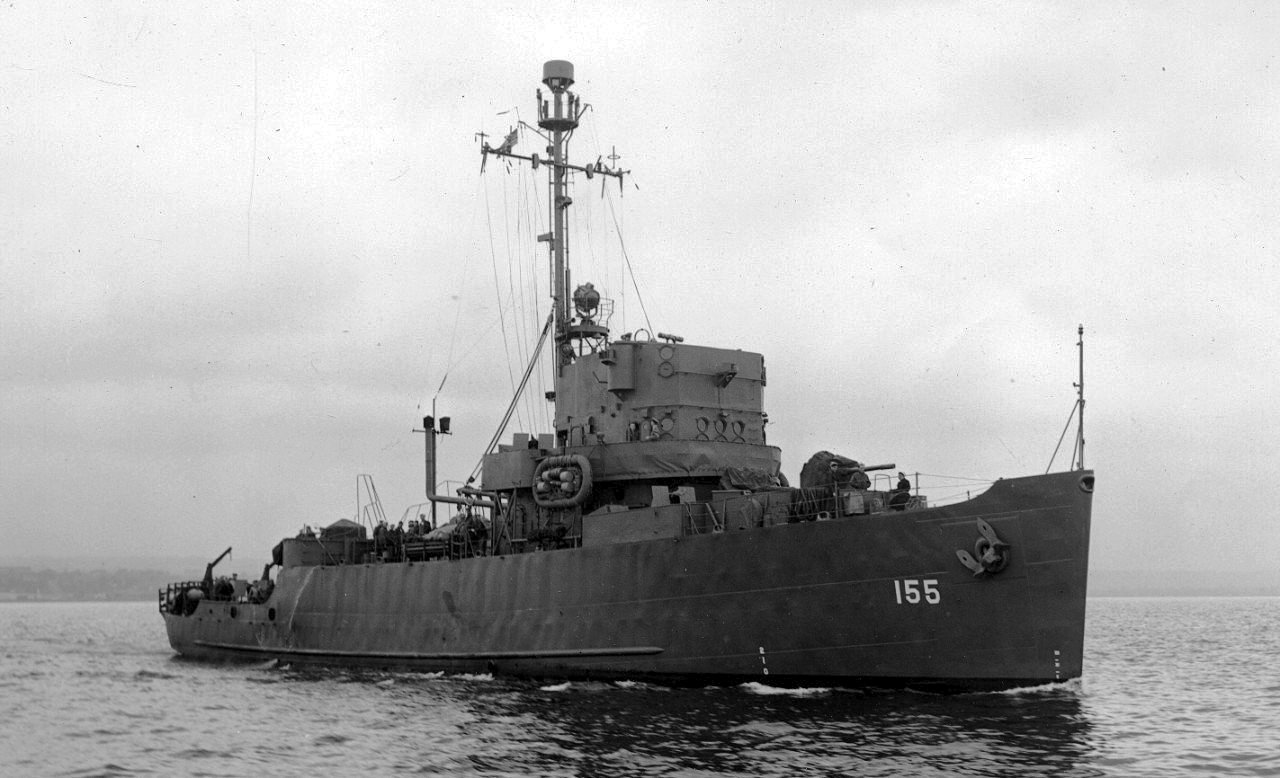
- Capable off Seattle, Washington as she heads for Cold Bay, Alaska in July 1945

History

United States
- Name: USS Capable (AMc-132)
- Builder: Willamette Iron and Steel Works, Portland, Oregon
- Reclassified: AM-155, 21 February 1942
- Laid down: 12 May 1942
- Launched: 16 October 1942
- Commissioned: 5 December 1943
- Decommissioned: 17 August 1945
- Fate: Transferred to Soviet Navy, 17 August 1945
- Reclassified: MSF-155, 7 February 1955
- Stricken: 1 January 1983

History

Soviet Union
- Name: T-339
- Acquired: 17 August 1945
- Commissioned: 17 August 1945
- Fate: Scrapped 1960

General characteristics
- Class & type: Admirable-class minesweeper
- Displacement: 650 tons
- Length: 184 ft 6 in (56.24 m)
- Beam: 33 ft (10 m)
- Draft: 9 ft 9 in (2.97 m)
- Propulsion: 2 × ALCO 539 diesel engines, 1,710 shp (1.3 MW); Farrel-Birmingham single reduction gear; 2 shafts
- Speed: 14.8 knots (27.4 km/h)
- Complement: 104
- Armament: 1 × 3"/50 caliber gun DP; 2 × twin Bofors 40 mm guns; 1 × Hedgehog anti-submarine mortar; 2 × depth charge tracks

Service record
- Part of: U.S. Pacific Fleet (1943–1945); Soviet Pacific Ocean Fleet (1945–1960)

USS Capable (AM-155) was an Admirable-class minesweeper built for the United States Navy during World War II. In 1945, she was transferred to the Soviet Union and then served in the Soviet Navy as T-339.

== Construction and commissioning ==
Originally classified as a "coastal minesweeper," AMc-132, Capable was reclassified as a "minesweeper," AM-155, on 21 February 1942. She was launched on 16 November 1942 at Portland, Oregon, by Willamette Iron and Steel Works and commissioned on 5 December 1943.

== Service history ==
=== U.S. Navy, World War II, 1943-1945 ===
After reporting to the Pacific Fleet for assignment, Capable cleared San Francisco, California, on 8 February 1944 bound for Pearl Harbor, Territory of Hawaii, and Majuro in the Marshall Islands. Arriving at Majuro on 9 March 1944, she was based there until October 1944, serving as a convoy escort, voyaging to Pearl Harbor, Kwajalein, Tarawa, Eniwetok, Manus, and Makin as the United States built up its fleet bases in the Pacific to support offensive operations against the Japanese. Moving on to the more advanced base at Eniwetok, she served on local patrol and escort in the Mariana Islands, and in February 1945 escorted a convoy to Ulithi as part of the preparations for the invasion of Iwo Jima.

Selected for transfer to the Soviet Navy in Project Hula – a secret program for the transfer of U.S. Navy ships to the Soviet Navy at Cold Bay, Territory of Alaska, in anticipation of the Soviet Union joining the war against Japan – Capable arrived at Seattle, Washington on 6 April 1945 for pre-transfer overhaul. With her overhaul complete, she arrived at Cold Bay on 11 July 1945 to begin familiarization training of her new Soviet crew.

=== Soviet Navy, 1945-1960 ===
Following the completion of training for her Soviet crew, Capable was decommissioned on 17 August 1945 at Cold Bay and transferred to the Soviet Union under Lend-Lease immediately. Also commissioned into the Soviet Navy immediately, she was designated as a tralshik ("minesweeper") and renamed T-339 in Soviet service. She soon departed Cold Bay bound for Petropavlovsk-Kamchatsky in the Soviet Union, where she served in the Soviet Far East.

In February 1946, the United States began negotiations for the return of ships loaned to the Soviet Union for use during World War II, and on 8 May 1947, United States Secretary of the Navy James V. Forrestal informed the United States Department of State that the United States Department of the Navy wanted 480 of the 585 combatant ships it had transferred to the Soviet Union for World War II use returned. Deteriorating relations between the two countries as the Cold War broke out led to protracted negotiations over the ships, and by the mid-1950s the U.S. Navy found it too expensive to bring home ships that had become worthless to it anyway. Many ex-American ships were merely administratively "returned" to the United States and instead sold for scrap in the Soviet Union, while the U.S. Navy did not seriously pursue the return of others because it viewed them as no longer worth the cost of recovery. The Soviet Union never returned Capable to the United States, although the U.S. Navy reclassified her as a "fleet minesweeper" (MSF) and redesignated her MSF-155 on 7 February 1955.

== Disposal ==
T-339 was scrapped in 1960. Unaware of her fate, the U.S. Navy kept Capable on its Naval Vessel Register until finally striking her on 1 January 1983.
