= USS Adopt =

Minesweeper of the United States Navy

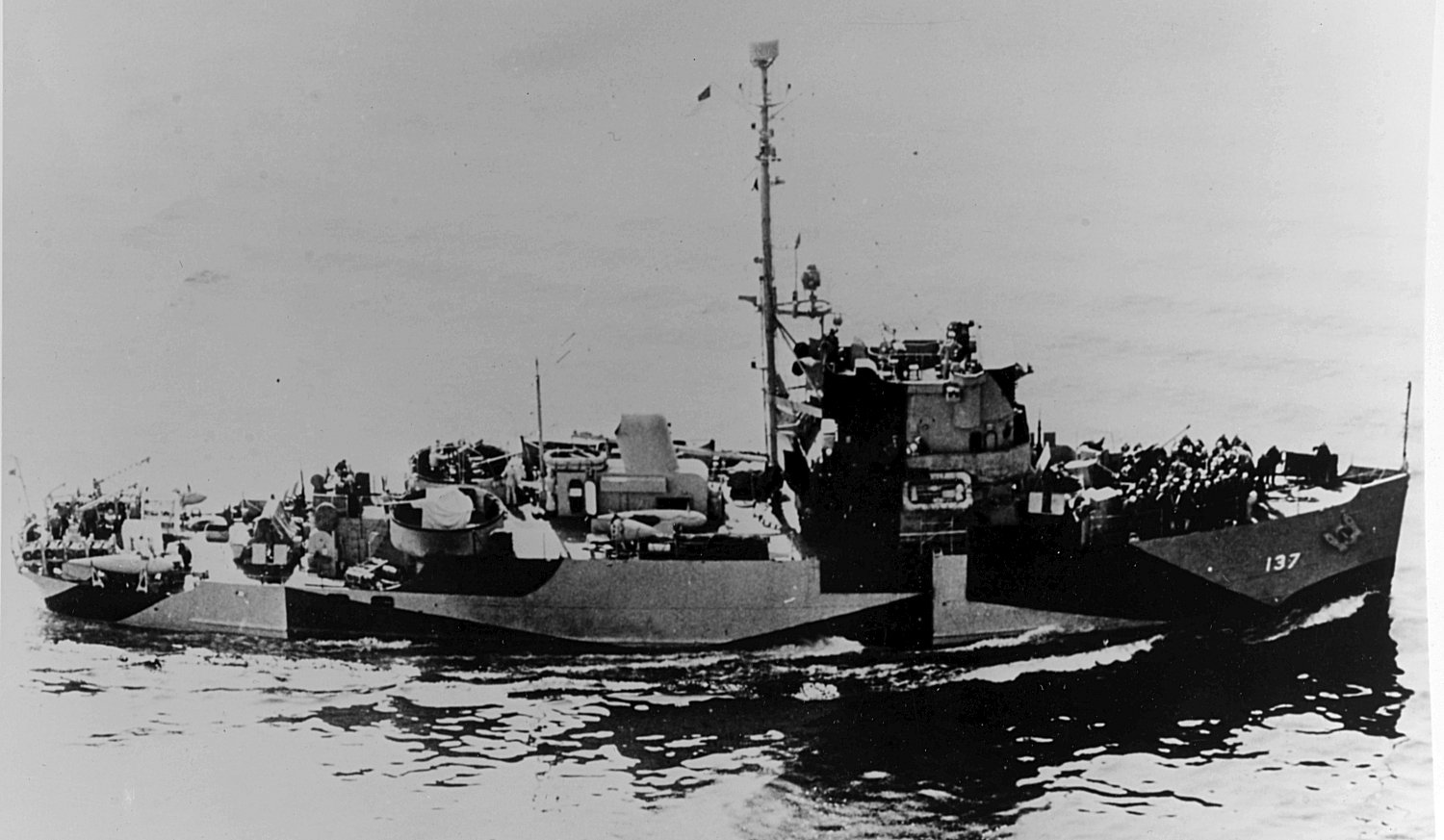
- Adopt underway in 1944

History

United States
- Name: USS Adopt (AMc-114)
- Builder: Tampa Shipbuilding Company, Tampa, Florida
- Reclassified: AM-137, 21 February 1942
- Laid down: 8 April 1942
- Launched: 18 October 1942
- Sponsored by: Mrs. Elizabeth H. Hastings
- Commissioned: 31 May 1943
- Decommissioned: 19 July 1945
- Fate: Transferred to Soviet Navy, 19 July 1945
- Reclassified: MSF-137, 7 February 1955
- Stricken: 1 January 1958 (possibly a misidentification of T-552 for T-332)

History

Soviet Union
- Name: T-332
- Acquired: 19 July 1945
- Commissioned: 19 July 1945
- Stricken: 1960

General characteristics
- Class & type: Admirable-class minesweeper
- Displacement: 650 tons
- Length: 184 ft 6 in (56.24 m)
- Beam: 33 ft (10 m)
- Draft: 9 ft 9 in (2.97 m)
- Propulsion: 2 × ALCO diesel engines, 1,710 shp (1.3 MW); 2 shafts
- Speed: 15 knots (27.8 km/h)
- Complement: 104
- Armament: 1 × 3-inch/50-caliber gun; 6 × Oerlikon 20 mm cannon; 4 × Bofors 40 mm L/60 gun; 1 × Hedgehog; 4 × depth charge projectors; 2 × depth charge racks; 2 × Minesweeping paravanes

Service record
- Part of: U.S. Pacific Fleet (1943–1945); Soviet Pacific Ocean Fleet (1945-1960)

USS Adopt (AMc-114/AM-137/MSF-137) was an Admirable-class minesweeper built for the United States Navy during World War II and in commission from 1943 to 1945. In 1945, she was transferred to the Soviet Navy under Lend-Lease as T-332.

== Construction and commissioning ==
Adopt was laid down on 8 April 1942 at Tampa, Florida, by the Tampa Shipbuilding Company, Inc. She was launched on 18 October 1942, sponsored by Mrs. Elizabeth H. Hastings, and commissioned on 31 May 1943.

== Service history ==
=== U.S. Navy, World War II, 1943-1945 ===
After conducting shakedown training off Key West, Florida, Adopt proceeded to Norfolk Navy Yard in Portsmouth, Virginia, for post-shakedown repairs and alterations and then began a series of minesweeping tests and exercises at Little Creek, Virginia, and Solomons Island, Maryland. These operations occupied her into early September 1943, when she departed for the United States West Coast. Adopt made a brief stop at Guantánamo Bay, Cuba, before transiting the Panama Canal and joining the United States Pacific Fleet. She reached San Diego, California, on 25 September 1943.

Adopt operated at San Diego as an escort ship through 26 May 1944. That same month, she reported for duty to the Commander, Western Sea Frontier. She left the U.S. West Coast on 6 June 1944 and shaped a course for Pearl Harbor, Territory of Hawaii, and took part in a 10-day period of antisubmarine warfare exercises in the waters of the Hawaiian Islands under the auspices of Commander, Task Force 1. On 23 June 1944, she departed Hawaii in a convoy bound for the Territory of Alaska.

Adopt reached Adak in the Aleutian Islands on 29 June 1944. She was subsequently based there at Naval Operating Base Kuluk Bay. During her service in Alaskan waters, Adopt carried out tactical and gunnery drills, held minesweeping exercises, and provided convoy escort services.

Selected for transfer to the Soviet Navy in Project Hula – a secret program for the transfer of U.S. Navy ships to the Soviet Navy at Cold Bay, Alaska, in anticipation of the Soviet Union joining the war against Japan – Adopt steamed into the anchorage at Cold Harbor in June 1945 and began training her new Soviet crew.

=== Soviet Navy, 1945-1954 ===
Following the completion of training for her Soviet crew, Adopt was decommissioned on 19 July 1945 at Cold Bay and transferred to the Soviet Union under Lend-Lease immediately. Also commissioned into the Soviet Navy immediately, she was designated as a tralshik ("minesweeper") and renamed T-332 in Soviet service. She soon departed Cold Bay bound for Petropavlovsk-Kamchatsky in the Soviet Union, where she served in the Soviet Far East.

== Disposal ==
In February 1946, the United States began negotiations for the return of ships loaned to the Soviet Union for use during World War II, and on 8 May 1947, United States Secretary of the Navy James V. Forrestal informed the United States Department of State that the United States Department of the Navy wanted 480 of the 585 combatant ships it had transferred to the Soviet Union for World War II use returned. Deteriorating relations between the two countries as the Cold War broke out led to protracted negotiations over the ships, and by the mid-1950s the U.S. Navy found it too expensive to bring home ships that had become worthless to it anyway. Many ex-American ships were merely administratively "returned" to the United States and instead sold for scrap in the Soviet Union, while others by mutual agreement between the two countries were destroyed off the Soviet coast under the observation of American naval authorities.

Although she was never returned to the United States, the U.S. Navy reclassified the ship as a "fleet minesweeper" (MSF) and redesignated her MSF-137 on 7 February 1955. T-332 was stricken by the Soviet Navy in 1960 and presumably sold for scrap.
