= USS Caution =

Minesweeper of the United States Navy

History

United States
- Name: USS Caution (AMc-135)
- Builder: Willamette Iron and Steel Works, Portland, Oregon
- Reclassified: AM-158, 21 February 1942
- Laid down: 23 May 1942
- Launched: 7 December 1942
- Commissioned: 10 February 1944
- Decommissioned: 17 August 1945
- Fate: Transferred to the Soviet Union, 17 August 1945
- Reclassified: MSF-158, 7 February 1955
- Stricken: 1 January 1983

History

Soviet Union
- Name: T-284
- Acquired: 17 August 1945
- Commissioned: 17 August 1945
- Fate: Scrapped 1960

General characteristics
- Class & type: Admirable-class minesweeper
- Displacement: 650 tons
- Length: 184 ft 6 in (56.24 m)
- Beam: 33 ft (10 m)
- Draft: 9 ft 9 in (2.97 m)
- Propulsion: 2 × ALCO 539 diesel engines, 1,710 shp (1.3 MW); Farrel-Birmingham single reduction gear; 2 shafts
- Speed: 14.8 knots (27.4 km/h)
- Complement: 104
- Armament: 1 × 3"/50 caliber gun DP; 2 × twin Bofors 40 mm guns; 1 × Hedgehog anti-submarine mortar; 2 × depth charge tracks

Service record
- Part of: U.S. Pacific Fleet (1944-1945); Soviet Pacific Ocean Fleet (1945-1960)

USS Caution (AM-158) was an Admirable-class minesweeper built for the United States Navy during World War II and was commissioned from 1944 to 1945. In 1945, she was transferred to the Soviet Union and served in the Soviet Navy as T-284.

== Construction and commissioning ==
Originally classified as a "coastal minesweeper," AMc-135, Caution was reclassified as a "minesweeper," AM-158, on 21 February 1942. She was launched at Portland, Oregon, on 7 December 1942 by Willamette Iron and Steel Works and commissioned on 10 February 1944.

== Service history ==
=== U.S. Navy, World War II, 1944-1945 ===
Reporting to the United States Pacific Fleet for assignment, Caution departed San Francisco, California, on 21 April 1944 and arrived at Pearl Harbor, Territory of Hawaii, on 1 May 1944. She escorted convoys from Pearl Harbor to Majuro and Eniwetok in the Marshall Islands until 1 August 1944, when she left for Saipan in the Mariana Islands. Arriving there on 25 August 1944, she was assigned to the Saipan-Tinian Patrol and Escort Group, and also escorted convoys to Eniwetok and back to the Marianas.

Selected for transfer to the Soviet Navy in Project Hula – a secret program for the transfer of U.S. Navy ships to the Soviet Navy at Cold Bay, Territory of Alaska, in anticipation of the Soviet Union joining the war against Japan – Caution departed Eniwetok on 5 April 1945, bound for Portland, Oregon, where she underwent a pre-transfer overhaul. With her overhaul complete, she arrived at Cold Bay on 11 July 1945 to begin familiarization training of her new Soviet crew.

=== Soviet Navy, 1945-1960 ===
Following the completion of training for her Soviet crew, Caution was decommissioned on 17 August 1945 at Cold Bay and transferred to the Soviet Union under Lend-Lease immediately. Also commissioned into the Soviet Navy immediately, she was designated as a tralshik ("minesweeper") and renamed T-284 in Soviet service. She soon departed Cold Bay bound for Petropavlovsk-Kamchatsky in the Soviet Union, where she served in the Soviet Far East.

In February 1946, the United States began negotiations for the return of ships loaned to the Soviet Union for use during World War II, and on 8 May 1947, United States Secretary of the Navy James V. Forrestal informed the United States Department of State that the United States Department of the Navy wanted 480 of the 585 combatant ships it had transferred to the Soviet Union for World War II use returned. Deteriorating relations between the two countries, as the Cold War broke out, led to protracted negotiations over the ships. By the mid-1950s, the U.S. Navy found it too expensive to bring home ships that had become worthless to it anyway. Many ex-American ships were merely administratively "returned" to the United States and instead sold for scrap in the Soviet Union. In contrast, the U.S. Navy did not seriously pursue the return of others because it viewed them as no longer worth the recovery cost. The Soviet Union never returned Caution to the United States, although the U.S. Navy reclassified her as a "fleet minesweeper" (MSF) and redesignated her MSF-158 on 7 February 1955.

== Disposal ==
T-284 was scrapped in 1960. Unaware of her fate, the U.S. Navy kept Caution on its Naval Vessel Register until finally striking her on 1 January 1983.
