= USS Astute =

Minesweeper warship

History

United States
- Name: USS Astute (AMc-125)
- Builder: Tampa Shipbuilding Company
- Reclassified: AM-148, 21 February 1942
- Laid down: 7 December 1942
- Launched: 23 February 1943
- Sponsored by: Mrs. M. L. Haney
- Commissioned: 17 January 1944
- Decommissioned: 19 July 1945
- Fate: Transferred to Soviet Navy, 19 July 1945
- Reclassified: MSF-148, 7 February 1955
- Stricken: 1 January 1983

History

Soviet Union
- Name: T-333
- Acquired: 19 July 1945
- Commissioned: 19 July 1945
- Fate: Scrapped 1960

General characteristics
- Class & type: Admirable-class minesweeper
- Displacement: 650 tons
- Length: 184 ft 6 in (56.24 m)
- Beam: 33 ft (10 m)
- Draft: 9 ft 9 in (2.97 m)
- Propulsion: 2 × ALCO 539 diesel engines, 1,710 shp (1.3 MW); Farrel-Birmingham single reduction gear; 2 shafts
- Speed: 14.8 knots (27.4 km/h)
- Complement: 104
- Armament: 1 × 3"/50 caliber gun DP; 2 × twin Bofors 40 mm guns; 1 × Hedgehog anti-submarine mortar; 2 × depth charge tracks

Service record
- Part of: U.S. Pacific Fleet (1944–1945); Soviet Pacific Ocean Fleet (1945–1960)

USS Astute (AM-148) was an Admirable-class minesweeper built for the United States Navy during World War II and in commission from 1944 to 1945. In 1945, she was transferred to the Soviet Navy, in which she served as T-333.

== Construction and commissioning ==
Originally classified as a "coastal minesweeper," AMc-125, Astute reclassified as a minesweeper, AM-148, on 21 February 1942. She was laid down on 7 December 1942 at Tampa, Florida, by the Tampa Shipbuilding Company, launched on 23 February 1943, sponsored by Mrs. M. L. Haney, and commissioned on 17 January 1944.

== Service history ==
=== U.S. Navy, World War II, 1944 ===
Following shakedown training, Astute transited the Panama Canal and joined the United States Pacific Fleet. She proceeded up the Pacific coast of North America and ultimately arrived in the Territory of Alaska, where she served during the latter part of 1944 and the first half of 1945 conducting patrol and escort duty.

Selected for transfer to the Soviet Navy in Project Hula – a secret program for the transfer of U.S. Navy ships to the Soviet Navy at Cold Bay, Alaska, in anticipation of the Soviet Union joining the war against Japan – Astute proceeded Cold Bay in the summer of 1945 and began training her new Soviet crew.

=== Soviet Navy, 1945–1960 ===
Following the completion of training for her Soviet crew, Astute was decommissioned on 19 July 1945 at Cold Bay and transferred to the Soviet Union under Lend-Lease immediately. Also commissioned into the Soviet Navy immediately, she was designated as a tralshik ("minesweeper") and renamed T-333 in Soviet service. She soon departed Cold Bay bound for Petropavlovsk-Kamchatsky in the Soviet Union, where she served in the Soviet Far East.

In February 1946, the United States began negotiations for the return of ships loaned to the Soviet Union for use during World War II, and on 8 May 1947, United States Secretary of the Navy James V. Forrestal informed the United States Department of State that the United States Department of the Navy wanted 480 of the 585 combatant ships it had transferred to the Soviet Union for World War II use returned. Deteriorating relations between the two countries as the Cold War broke out led to protracted negotiations over the ships, and by the mid-1950s the U.S. Navy found it too expensive to bring home ships that had become worthless to it anyway. Many ex-American ships were merely administratively "returned" to the United States and instead sold for scrap in the Soviet Union, while the U.S. Navy did not seriously pursue the return of others because it viewed them as no longer worth the cost of recovery. The Soviet Union never returned Astute to the United States, although the U.S. Navy reclassified her as a "fleet minesweeper" (MSF) and redesignated her MSF-148 on 7 February 1955.

== Disposal ==
T-333 was scrapped in the Soviet Union in 1960. Unaware of this, the U.S. Navy retained Astute on its Naval Vessel Register until finally striking her name on 1 January 1983.
