= Detector (disambiguation) =

A detector is a device capable of registering a specific substance or physical phenomenon.

Detector may also refer to:

- Detector (radio), a device that recovers information from a modulated wave
- Detector (film), a 2000 Norwegian film
- USS Detector, two United States Navy ships
  - USS Detector (AMc-75), was a coastal minesweeper launched 29 May 1941
  - USS Detector (AM-429), was a minesweeper launched 5 December 1952
