= USC&GS Explorer (OSS 28) =

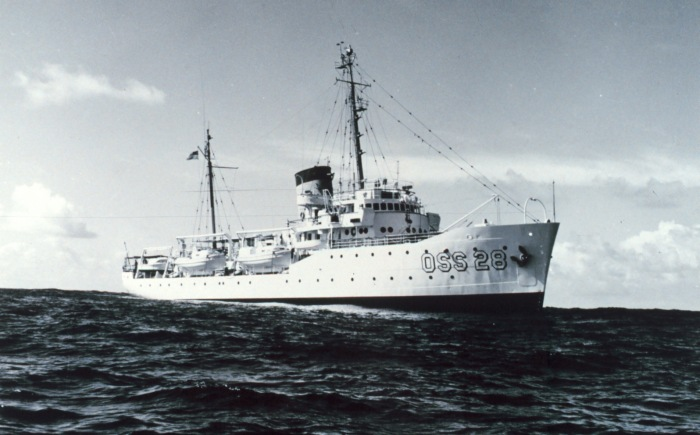
- USC&GS Explorer (OSS 28) underway in the Atlantic Ocean ca. 1965.

History

United States
- Name: USC&GS Explorer (OSS 28)
- Namesake: Explorer, one who seeks out new information by means of travel
- Builder: Lake Washington Shipyard, Houghton, Washington
- Launched: 14 October 1939
- Acquired: delivered 9 March 1940
- Commissioned: Spring 1940
- Decommissioned: 1968

General characteristics
- Type: Ocean survey ship (OSS)
- Displacement: 1,500 tons (light); 1,800 tons (loaded)
- Length: 220 ft 8 in (67.26 m)
- Beam: 38 ft (12 m)
- Draft: 15 ft 2 in (4.62 m) (loaded)
- Depth: 23 ft 2 in (7.06 m)
- Installed power: 2x 50 kW, 115 V Westinghouse direct current turbogenerators; 1x 25 kW Westinghouse AC/DC converter for shore power conversion; 5 kW generator for sounding equipment and 10 kW emergency diesel-driven generator.
- Propulsion: 2 Babcock & Wilcox (B&W) superheated boilers fired by B&W burners driving a double reduction geared DeLaval turbine developing 2,000 horsepower(1,491 kW)
- Speed: 12 knots
- Range: 7,000 miles
- Boats & landing craft carried: 4 x 30 ft (9.1 m) survey launches; 2 x other launches; 2 x 24 ft (7.3 m) whaleboats; 2 x non-magnetic whaleboats; 6 x 16-and-20 ft (4.9-and-6.1 m) skiffs and dories.
- Complement: up to 90 (including crew, technical and survey personnel)
- Sensors & processing systems: Fathometer, a Dorsey sonic depth finder, a Hughes automatic depth recorder system, a special taut-wire measuring gear with 120 nautical miles (138 statute miles; 222 km) of fine wire and several tons of iron balls, and hydrophones.

The second USC&GS Explorer (OSS 28) was a survey ship that served in the United States Coast and Geodetic Survey from 1940 to 1968. She operated in the Pacific Ocean from 1940 to 1960, seeing service there during World War II, and in the Atlantic Ocean from 1960 to 1968.

== Construction and commissioning ==
The Seattle, Washington, firm of W. C. Nickum Sons developed a detailed design and unusual construction procedures for Explorer from United States Government designs. The largest ship constructed in the Pacific Northwest since 1924, she was built by Lake Washington Shipyard at Houghton, Washington, as a Coast and Geodetic Survey "ocean survey ship" (OSS). Launched on 14 October 1939, she was delivered to the Coast and Geodetic Survey on 9 March 1940. She was commissioned in the spring of 1940 as USC&GS Explorer (OSS 28). United States Coast and Geodetic Survey Corps officer Commander A. M. Soberalski supervised her construction and became her first commanding officer.

== Technical characteristics ==
Explorer was designed to be virtually fireproof and collision-proof. Of the materials used to construct her, 99.5 percent were fireproof, and Johns-Manville asbestos Flexboard paneling covered all of her interior spaces. She was built of heavy steel, and her hull plating and internal subdivision was almost twice that required for a ship of her class, greatly reducing her vulnerability to flooding in the event of a collision. Eight transverse bulkheads extending up to the main deck divided her into nine watertight compartments, and she was designed to withstand the flooding of two of the compartments without sinking; only three of the bulkheads were pierced by openings, and these could be sealed by closing electrically driven watertight doors operated from the bridge. To protect her hull from penetration by ice or rocks, Explorer had a double bottom and a 0.5-inch (12.7-mm) steel belt plate along her sides that extended six feet (1.8 meters) above and below the waterline. She was designed for six-month independent deployments, with the capability to service smaller vessels and shore stations. Explorer was equipped with a hospital, machine shop, electrical shop, carpenter shop, laundry, and marine garage. The accommodation for her crew and other embarked personnel were considered especially comfortable for the era. She could carry 99 tons of boiler water, 75 tons of drinking and cooking water, and 325 tons of fuel, giving her a cruising range of 7,000 nautical miles (8,056 statute miles; 12,964 km) at a speed of 12 knots (14 mph; 22 km/h).

To avoid electrical interference with her sensitive hydrographic surveying equipment, Explorer′s deck machinery and major auxiliary equipment all was driven by high-pressure steam. When commissioned, Explorer was considered to have the finest and most extensive hydrographic surveying equipment in the history of the Coast and Geodetic Survey's fleet, all entirely electrically powered. The equipment included a fathometer, a Dorsey sonic depth finder, a Hughes automatic depth recorder system, a special taut-wire measuring gear with 120 nautical miles (138 statute miles; 222 km) of fine wire and several tons of iron balls, and hydrophones. Electrolysis eliminators mounted to her hull ensured that she would be grounded so as to avoid interference with her electrical surveying equipment.

Explorer had two 1,500-U.S.-gallon (1,249- Imperial-gallon; 5,678-liter) tanks for gasoline and diesel oil for the fleet of 16 boats she operated, consisting of four 30-foot (9.1-meter) heavy launches powered by 30-hp (22.4-kW) diesel engines and outfitted for hydrographic surveying, two additional launches carried on heavy davits, two 24-foot (7.3-meter) whaleboats powered by gasoline engines, two non-magnetic whaleboats, and six 16- and 20-foot (4.9- and 6.1-meter) skiffs and dories. She also had a 5-ton magazine for the storage of explosives used in radio acoustic ranging operations.

When commissioned, Explorer was painted a brilliant white, with a brown deckhouse and red funnel and masts. Her paint scheme, raked masts and funnel, yacht-like stem, and cruiser stern gave her the appearance of a yacht or cruiser when her large fleet of boats were not stowed on deck.

== Service history ==
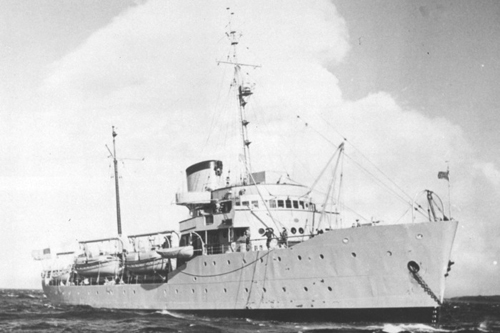
USC&GS Explorer (OSS 28) at anchor.

Upon her commissioning, Explorer toured ports in California in April 1940. She entered service in time to take part in the 1940 field season, during which she was assigned to conduct hydrographic surveys in the Aleutian Islands westward from Umnak Island with the smaller vessel E. Lester Jones (ASV-79) assisting. After an assignment in the Strait of Juan de Fuca-San Juan Islands area of Washington during the winter of 1940-1941, she returned to the Aleutians for the 1941 field season to survey the waters westward from Yunaska Island. After the conclusion of the 1941 season in the Aleutians, she began survey work around Midway Atoll, but was recalled from Midway after the Japanese attack on Pearl Harbor of 7 December 1941 brought the United States into World War II. Steaming from Midway to Honolulu, Territory of Hawaii, she rescued the crew of an aircraft which had ditched in the Pacific Ocean due to fuel exhaustion. She then returned to the Aleutians for the 1942 field season, extending triangulation work as far as the eastern end of Atka Island and hydrographic surveys as far as Seguam Island. During the season, in June 1942, the Aleutians became a front-line combat area after Imperial Japanese Navy aircraft attacked Dutch Harbor and Imperial Japanese Army and Navy forces occupied Attu and Kiska, beginning the Aleutian Islands campaign.

After the conclusion of Aleutians work in 1942, Explorer returned to survey operations around the San Juan Islands in Washington and performed wire-drag survey work around the Hein Bank with USC&GS Patton, but during the 1943 season she resumed operations in combat areas in the Aleutians as U.S. and Canadian forces drove the Japanese out of the islands. On one occasion during the fighting in the Aleutians in 1942-1943 she fought off an attacking Imperial Japanese Navy aircraft. In 1944 and 1945 she continued to operate in support of U.S. Navy World War II hydrographic needs in the Aleutians until Japan surrendered in August 1945, bringing the war to a close. Postwar, she spent the 1946 field season in the Aleutians cooperating with the Coast and Geodetic Survey ships USC&GS Surveyor and USC&GS Derickson in extending an arc of triangulation from Kiska to Attu, completing an arc extending across the continental United States, Territory of Alaska, and Aleutians, and conducted triangulation, topographic, and hydrographic surveys in the coastal waters north and south of Attu and in other parts of the Near Islands.

In 1960, Explorer transferred to the United States East Coast, where she spent the remainder of her career, focusing mainly on oceanographic research. In 1963, she participated in the EQUALANT I and EQUALANT II subprojects of the International Cooperative Investigations of the Tropical Atlantic (ICITA) project, the first international cooperative oceanographic/meteorological project in which a United States Government scientific agency took part.

The Coast and Geodetic Survey retired Explorer in 1968.
