= Astoria Marine Construction Company =

Shipyard in Astoria, Oregon, and National Register of Historic Places

- Astoria Marine Construction Company Historic District
- U.S. National Register of Historic Places
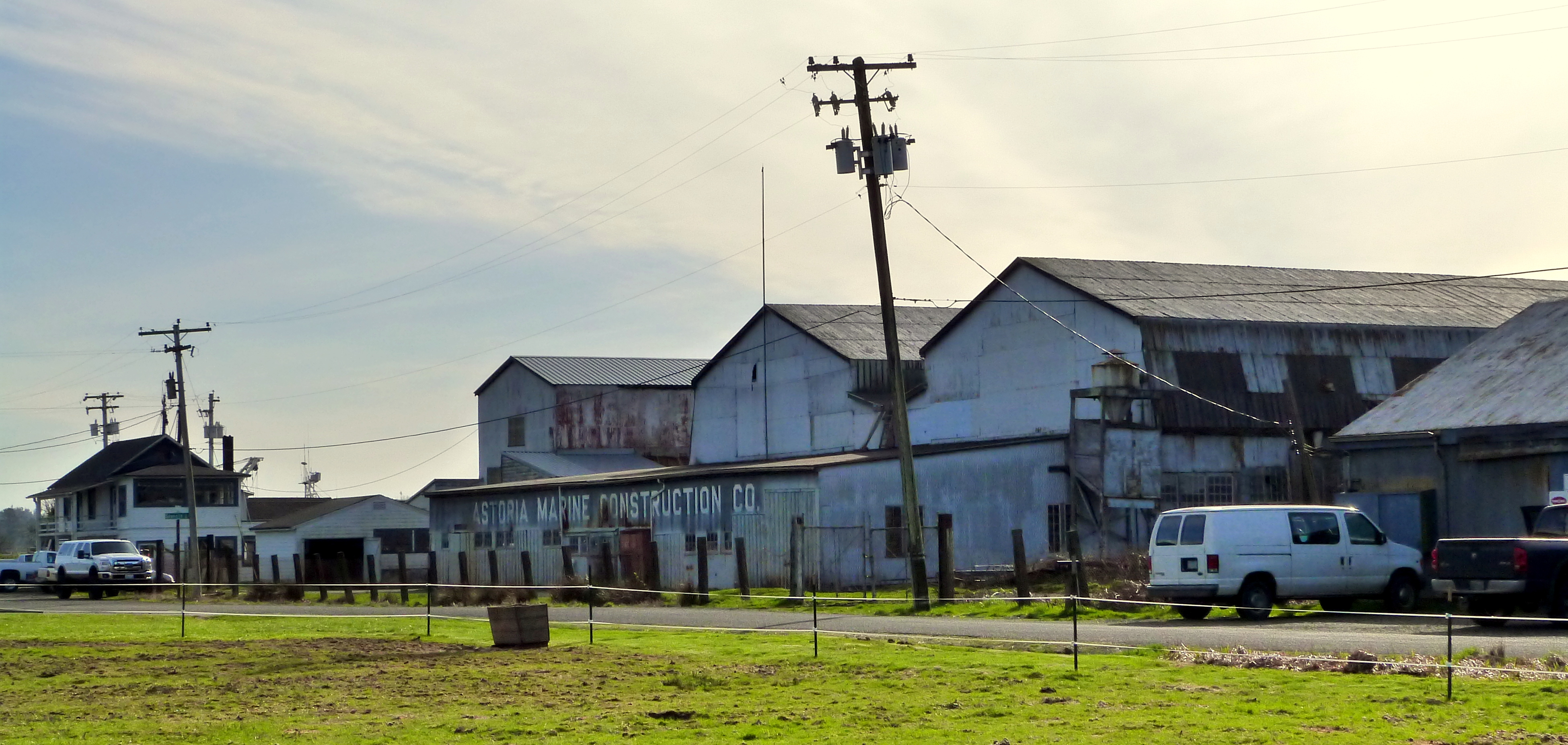
- Astoria Marine Construction Company; Astoria Oregon in 2014

- Location within Oregon Location within the United States
- Location: Clatsop County, Oregon, US
- Nearest city: Astoria, Oregon
- Coordinates: 46.144722°N 123.862500°W
- Area: 7.2 acres (2.9 ha)
- Built: 1929
- NRHP reference No.: 13001058
- Added to NRHP: January 8, 2014

Astoria Marine Construction Company Historic District

Astoria Marine Construction (AMCCO) was founded as Astoria Shipbuilding by Joe Dyer is 1929 in Jeffers Gardens of Astoria, Oregon. Joe Dyer's father was a pioneer of early Astoria and operated a family sawmill. Joe Dyer started by building wooden fishing boats at his shipyard. Then added wooden pleasure craft to his product line. Joe Dyer designed and built Columbia River One Design (CROD) boats and boats for the United States Navy. The shipyard was on the east bank of the Lewis and Clark River and the Jeffers Slough. Due to its historical importance the site is on the National Register of Historic Places in Clatsop County, Oregon. Astoria Marine Construction shipyard closed in 2013.

== History ==
Before starting his shipyard, Joe Dyer (1898–1974) was given a contract to build 12 Bristol Bay sailing gill-netters in 1924. Joe Dyer partnered with Acme (Ac) Mansker, and Clair Mansker to build 12 boats, calling the firm Astoria Shipbuilding in 1929. Together they built a new 7.2 acre shipyard. The yard grew, Astoria Shipbuilding built the Arrow No. 2 Astoria's river pilot boat. In 1926 Ac Mansker and his family departed the firm and moved to Puget Sound. Ac Mansker later worked as a superintendent at Bellingham Shipyards and later Todd Shipyards in Seattle. In addition to building wooden boats, Dyer added metal sheet, called ice sheathing to the bows of wooden cargo ships, to protect the hull in iced ports.

=== Tourist III ===
In 1931 Dyer received his first large project, the design and construction of a 120-foot car ferry, called the Tourist III run by Captain Fritz Elving. The Tourist III operated for the Astoria-North Beach Ferry Company, on the Astoria – North shore route. Dyer leased a shipway at the Port of Astoria to build the large Tourist III and hired a crew. Tourist III was built in 90 days, so good a ship it put its rival Columbia Transportation out of action in two years. Tourist III was 109 ft (33.22 m) long, 233 tons, with a capacity of: 28 automobiles, 280 passengers. Tourist III ferry service started on July 4, 1931. The Tourist III Astoria run ended in 1966 as the Astoria – Megler Bridge was built. The Tourist III was taken to Kodiak, Alaska and was used as a floating crab-processing plant.

== Great Depression ==
=== Columbia River One Design ===
The Great Depression was difficult on Astoria Shipbuilding Company, but the firm survived. Columbia River Yachting Association contacted the shipyard to design and build a one-class racing and cruising sloop in 1934. The Columbia River One Design (CROD) became the standard for the Astoria regatta races for the next thirty years. The shipyard built five Columbia River One Design (CROD) and due to the depression sold four CRODs as kits between 1934 and 1940. The second CROD built, CROD No. 2, named Jean II was sold to Dean Webster of Portland, Oregon, he won first in class in the Pacific International Yachting Association race. After World War II Dyer built three more CRODs, including one for himself Joe's own boat, called Tom Tom after his son, that was passed down to his son. Astoria Shipbuilding built 12 Columbia River One Design (CROD), the 28-foot sloops became a classic. Columbia River One Design hulls 1 and 2 were donated to the Columbia River Maritime Museum.

- Columbia river one design:
  - Length 27.83 feet
  - Beam 8.83 feet
  - Draft 2.33 feet, Maximum draft 5 feet
  - Sail area at max 344 sq. feet
  - Monohull keel with centerboard wood
  - Waterline length 24 ft
  - Displacement 7,000 lbs
  - Ballast 950 lbs
  - Hull speed 6.56 knots (had back up Westerbeke Universal gasoline engine with 20-gallon tank)

=== Great depression boats ===
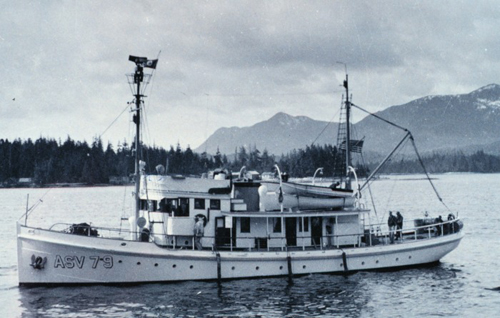
E Lester Jones built by Astoria Marine in 1938

In 1935, naval architect John Omundse joined the firm. In 1935 Dyer built a 36-foot express cruiser, Joanne, for A. N. Prouty, a local mill owner, also a luxurious 50-footer, Phantom with twin V-8 for Dr. Wallace Haworth of Portland. In 1938 Dyer built a 47-foot boat the Evening Star for Portland businessman Milt Henderson. In 1938, Dyer built a 52-foot gaff-rigged schooner, Pagan, for Edward Hefty. In 1938 Astoria Marine won a contract with United States Coast and Geodetic Survey to build an 88-foot survey ship, the E Lester Jones out of pressure-treated wood. The wood was pressure-treated at a plant in Wauna, Oregon. Heine Dole a new engineer with Astoria Marine was key in overseeing the project.

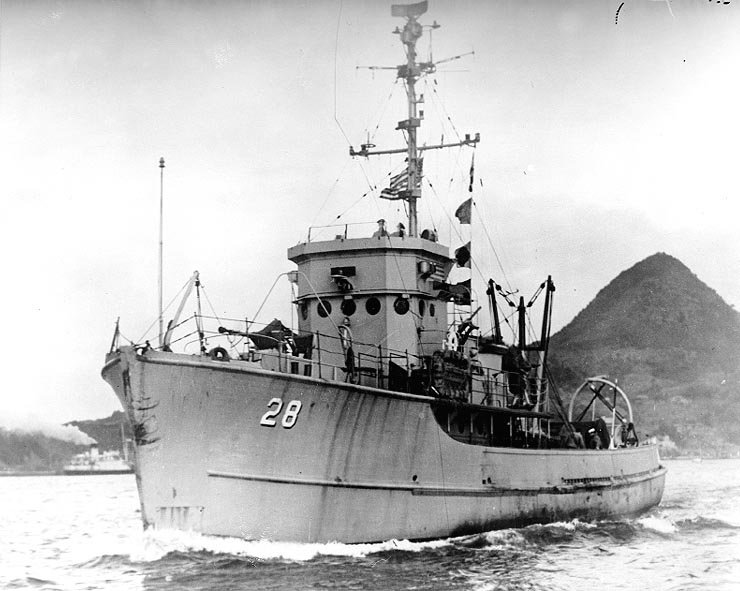
USS Osprey (AMS-28) built by Astoria Marine in 1944

== World War II ==
To support the World War II effort, Astoria Marine Construction built boats for the United States Navy and United States Army. At its peak in 1943, Astoria Marine Construction had over 1,500 workers. Dyer improved an East Coast Navy designed Minesweepers. Astoria Shipbuilding Company won on April 1, 1941, a $1,312,000 contract to build four minesweepers. Astoria Marine Construction built a new shipyard for the minesweeper assembly line at a Port of Astoria facility. Other orders were given to Astoria Shipbuilding. Astoria Marine operated three-yard during the war: Lewis and Clark River, Astoria Port Docks, and Tongue Point yard. Astoria Marine also converted 50 escort carriers and 56 ammunition ships for the war efforts.

For the US Navy Astoria Marine Construction built:

- YMS-1 type 137-foot Minesweepers
- YMS-135 subclass Minesweepers, like USS Osprey (AMS-28) and USS Minah (AMc-204)
- YP 623 type 128-foot Patrol Craft, like PCS 1465

For the US Army Astoria Marine Construction built:

- MTL Tugboats a Type V ship Motor Launch
- World War II boats:

Boat	Owner	Type	Tons	Feet long	Delivery date	Fate
YMS 100	US Navy	Minesweeper	278d	137	20-Jun-42	To the USSR 1945 as T 602
YMS 101	US Navy	Minesweeper	278d	137	17-Jul-42	Struck 1946
YMS 102	US Navy	Minesweeper	278d	137	22-Aug-42	Struck 1947
YMS 103	US Navy	Minesweeper	278d	137	19-Sep-42	Mined off Okinawa and lost 1945
YMS 135	US Navy	Minesweeper	278d	137	20-Feb-43	To the USSR 1945 as T 606
YMS 136	US Navy	Minesweeper	278d	137	19-Mar-43	Renamed AMS 46, to Brazil 1960 as Jutai M14, struck 1969
YMS 137	US Navy	Minesweeper	278d	137	17-Apr-43	Britain as BYMS 2137 in 1943, to Italy 1947 as Orchida, then Calisto
YMS 138	US Navy	Minesweeper	278d	137	7-Jun-43	To Thailand 1947 as Ladea,
YMS 139	US Navy	Minesweeper	278d	137	24-Jun-43	To the USSR 1945 as T 594
YMS 140	US Navy	Minesweeper	278d	137	12-Aug-43	Sold private 1946 as Salvor, later Salvage Queen and Clearwater
YMS 141	US Navy	Minesweeper	278d	137	28-Aug-43	Britain BYMS 2141 in 1943, to Italy 1947 as Dalia, struck 1966
YMS 142	US Navy	Minesweeper	278d	137	30-Sep-43	To Britain 1943 as BYMS 2142, to Italy 1947 as Azalea, struck 1966
MTL 1057	US Army	Tug		47	Oct-43	Ship design 324-A, 12 ft beam, Diesel 260 shp
MTL 1058	US Army	Tug		47	Oct-43	
MTL 1059	US Army	Tug		47	Oct-43	
MTL 1060	US Army	Tug		47	Oct-43	
MTL 1061	US Army	Tug		46	Nov-43	Ship design 410
MTL 1062	US Army	Tug		46	Nov-43	
MTL 1063	US Army	Tug		46	Nov-43	
MTL 1064	US Army	Tug		46	Nov-43	
MTL 1065	US Army	Tug		46	Nov-43	
MTL 1066	US Army	Tug		46	Dec-43	
MTL 1067	US Army	Tug		46	Dec-43	
MTL 1068	US Army	Tug		46	Dec-43	
MTL 1069	US Army	Tug		46	Dec-43	
MTL 1070	US Army	Tug		46	Dec-43	
MTL 1071	US Army	Tug		46	Dec-43	
YT 312	US Navy	Tug		70	1943–44	Destroyed 1948
YT 313	US Navy	Tug		70	1943–44	Sold 1946
YT 314	US Navy	Tug		70	1943–44	Sold 1947
YT 315	US Navy	Tug		70	1943–44	Sold
PCS 1464	US Navy	Minesweeper	338d	136	8-Jan-44	became Medrick (AMc 203), to MARAD in 1948
PCS 1465	US Navy	Minesweeper	338d	136	15-Feb-44	became USS Minah (AMc-204), then AMCU 14, MHC 14, sold 1960
YMS 422	US Navy	Minesweeper	278d		27-Sep-44	renamed Osprey (AMS 28), to Japan 1955 as Yakushima (YTE 10)
YMS 423	US Navy	Minesweeper	278d		25-Oct-44	To South Korea 1948 as Kaya San, sunk 1949
YMS 424	US Navy	Minesweeper	278d		24-Nov-44	Lost 1945
YMS-425	US Navy	Minesweeper	278d		21-Dec-44	renamed USS Siskin, scrapped 1968
YMS 426	US Navy	Minesweeper	278d		21-Dec-44	renamed in 1947 to Siskin (AMS 58), scrapped 1968
YP 623	US Navy	Patrol Craft		128	1944	To MARAD in 1947
YP 624	US Navy	Patrol Craft		128	1944	To MARAD in 1947

== Post War II ==
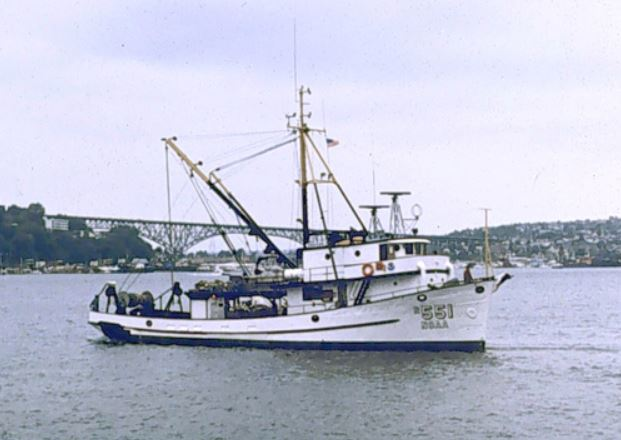
NOAAS Oregon built by Astoria Marine in 1946

Astoria Marine Construction built 79-foot trawlers including the Trask and the Shirley Lee. Astoria Marine Construction built a 58-foot seiner without an order and took two years to sell. Dyer built a CROD, the Tom Tom for himself in 1945. Astoria Marine Construction worked the reserve fleet at Tongue Point. For the Navy, and National Defense Reserve Fleet, Astoria Marine Construction worked on "mothballing" ships and boats. Astoria Marine was able to rent two Auxiliary Repair Docks (ARD) Auxiliary floating drydock to repair large ships and boats. NOAAS Oregon was built in 1946 under a US contract with Reconstruction Finance Corporation, to help with the shortage of fishing boats after the war. Many good fishing boats had been used for patrol boats. In 1949 she was acquired by the United States Department of the Interior for fish and wildlife work. In 1970 Oregon was acquired by the National Oceanic and Atmospheric Administration (NOAA) and used the Oregon for 10 years.

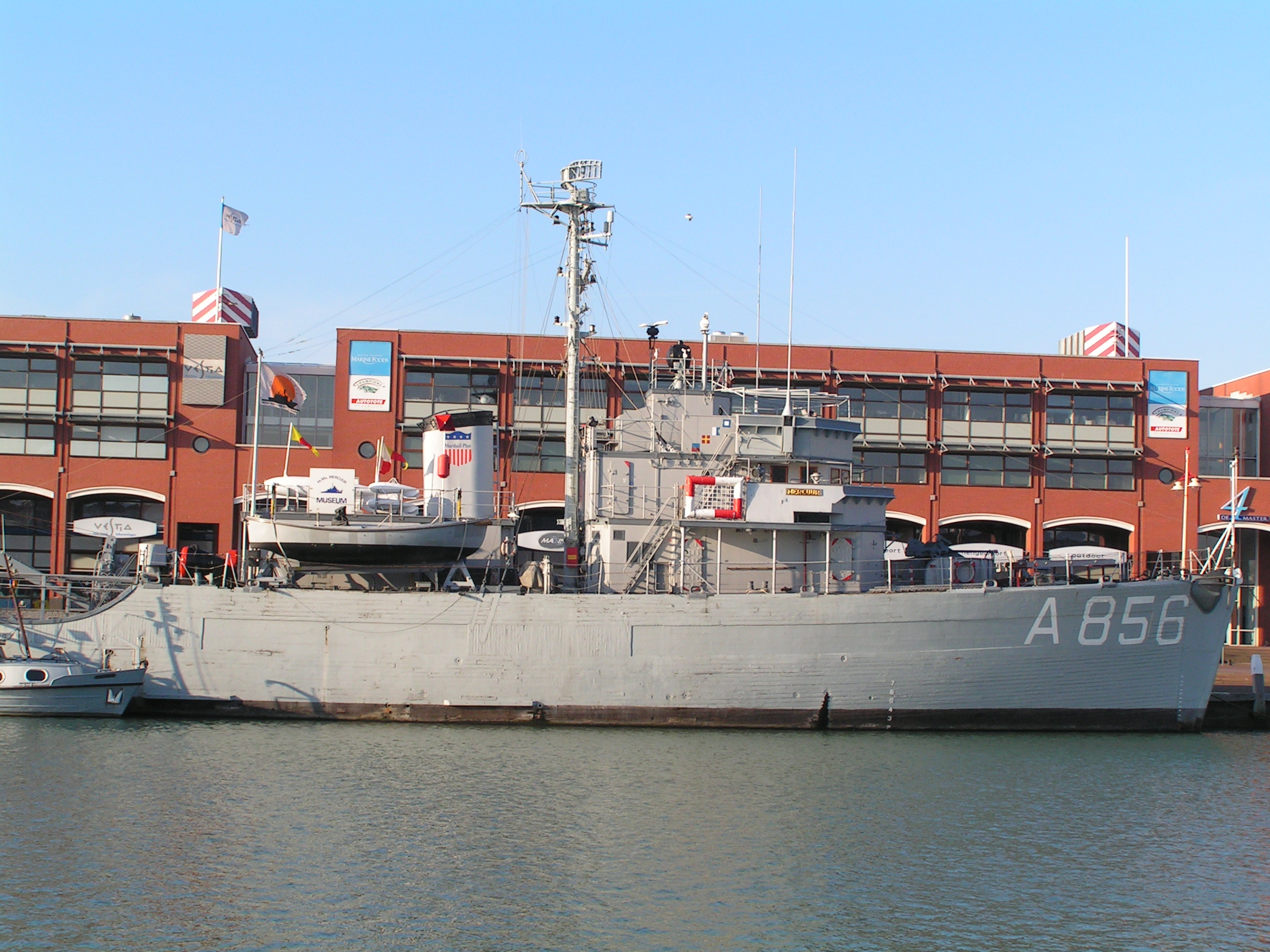
Onversaagd-class minesweeper, Astoria Marine built three of this class in 1952

== Korean War ==
Astoria Marine Construction won the contract to build new Agile-class minesweeper minesweepers with less iron (non-magnetic), less likely to set off new naval mines used in the Korean War. The first contract was for two ships, AM 480, the USS Dash, and AM 481, the USS Detector with aluminum engines. Next Astoria Marine Construction received an order for three more Onversaagd-class minesweepers for the Royal Netherlands Navy. Astoria Marine de-mothballed ships and boats in the reserve fleet, so they could be used for the war. After the war the yard built fishing vessels and tug boats and repaired boats. In 1957 Astoria Marine Construction built the grand 39-foot Cutter Yacht Patronilla, for Bill Forrest. In 1966 the last grand Yacht built was the 39 -foot, Jeanne Elizabeth, for Leah Pierce.

- Korean War ships:

ID	Name	owner	Type	Tons	Feet long	Delivery date	Fate
MSO 428	USS Dash	U.S. Navy	Minesweeper	780d	172	14-Aug-53	Scrapped 1983
MSO 429	USS Detector	U.S. Navy	Minesweeper	780d	172	26-Jan-54	Scrapped 1983
MSO 480	Onversaagd	U.S. Navy	Minesweeper	780d	172	19-May-54	To the Netherlands as M 884, scrapped 1979
MSO 481	Onvevreesde	U.S. Navy	Minesweeper	780d	172	21-Sep-54	To the Netherlands as M 885, scrapped 1989
MSO 482	Onverschrokken	U.S. Navy	Minesweeper	780d	172	18-Jan-55	To the Netherlands as M 886, torpedo trials ship 1972

== Joseph M. Dyer ==
Joseph M. Dyer was born in 1898, in South Bend, Washington. His father ran a small family sawmill. The family moved to Astoria, Oregon on Columbia River when Joe was young. His father became the manager of Clatsop Mill on Scow Bay at 13th and Exchange Street. His father died when Joe was fourteen in 1912. As a young boy, Joe would hang around Tim Driscoll's boat shop a lower Columbia River boat builder, and fell in love with boat building. Tim L. Driscoll (1870–1967) taught Joe skills he would use later, Driscoll's father-in-law was a Clatsop Indian canoe builder, his father was an English seaman. Driscoll was known for his bowpicker boats, which Dyer would later build also. At 18 Joe joined the United States Navy Reserve and was sent to war. For World War I he serviced on the USS Goldsborough a torpedo boat. He was trained on the Goldsborough and then became a trainer of other new sailors as the Goldsborough patrol the Pacific Northwest coast. In 1918, after the war, Joe took Mechanical Engineering classes at Oregon Agricultural College, now called Oregon State University, and worked repairing fish boats in the summer. He designed buildings that replaced ones lost in the 1922 Astoria, Oregon fire. In 1924, Joe Dyer partnered with the Mansker brothers and started the shipyard. Dyer married Genevieve (Geno) Thompson in 1929, they built a house across the road from the shipyard. Dyer retired in 1964, at age 66, he turned the operations of the shipyard over to the employees. In 1968, he sold the shipyard to its employees, who that wanted to buy it. At the request of a friend, he helped build one last boat, the Mary Carol, a motor yacht for Ed Ross, an advertising executive. Don Fastabend, who started work at the yard in 1950, was the last of the employees who owned part of the shipyard and ran the yard as a boat repair shop. Fastabend, the last owner of the yard, died in October 2013, the yard closed in 2013. The shipyard records were donated to the Columbia River Maritime Museum.

In addition to being a boat builder, Joe Dyer held office in the Oregon legislature. He was a chairman in the local United Way. For his civic work, he was awarded the Astoria's First Citizen Award. Joe Dyer also served as the first chairman of the Oregon State Marine Board. The Board worked with state regulations on pleasure boat activity and safety. Joe Dyer helped start the Columbia River Maritime Museum. Joe died in 1974 at age 76, his wife Geno died in 1983. Dyer's had a son Thomas R. Dyer, who worked in Seattle at a marine consultancy firm and sailed his dad's boat CROD No. 10, Tom Tom. Thomas was Sea Scout, for his group he restored 26-foot whaleboat, later Tom and the yard built a 14-foot Blue Jay for the group. Tom and the yard built a six 8-foot El Toro that used local yacht club members, some used in El Toro championship races in Youngs Bay.

The site of the shipyard is on the List of Oregon's Most Endangered Places.

== See also ==
- List of auxiliaries of the United States Navy
- Wooden boats of World War 2
