= List of ships named Mercuur =

HNLMS Mercuur (Dutch: Hr.Ms. or Zr.Ms. Mercuur) may refer to the following ships of the Royal Netherlands Navy that have been named after Mercuur:

- Mercuur (1782)
- Mercuur (1804)
- Mercuur (1809)
- Mercuur (1818)
- Mercuur (1822)
- HNLMS Mercuur (1883)
- HNLMS Groote Merkuur
- HNLMS Mercuur (1888)
- HNLMS Mercuur (1936), a submarine tender and torpedo maintenance and repair ship that served during World War II and was captured by the Kriegsmarine where it served under the name Merkur (HI 1).
- HNLMS Mercuur (1973), an Onverslaagd-class minesweeper that was renamed to HNLMS Mercuur in 1973 upon which she was recommissioned as a submarine tender.
- HNLMS Mercuur, a submarine support ship and torpedo maintenance and repair ship in service from 1987.
