= USS Detector =

USS Detector is a name used more than once by the U.S. Navy:

- USS Detector (AMc-75), was a coastal minesweeper launched 29 May 1941.
- USS Detector (AM-429), was a minesweeper launched 5 December 1952.
