= USS Dash (AM-428) =

Minesweeper of the United States Navy

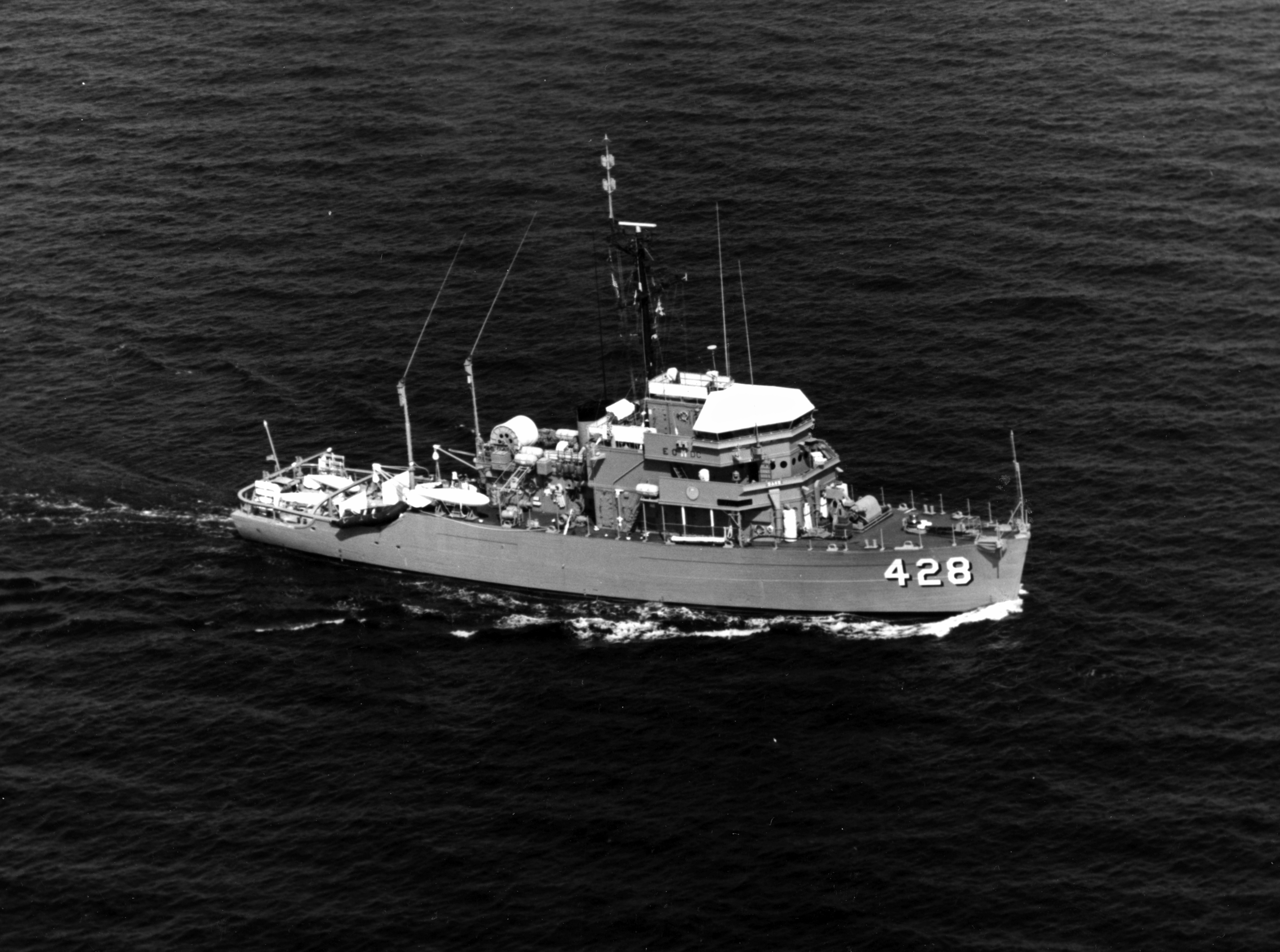

History

United States
- Name: USS Dash
- Builder: Astoria Marine Construction, Astoria, Oregon
- Laid down: 2 July 1951
- Launched: 20 September 1952
- Commissioned: 14 August 1953
- Decommissioned: 2 October 1982
- Reclassified: MSO-428, 7 February 1955
- Home port: Little Creek, VA
- Motto: Follow Me
- Fate: Sold for scrap, 26 January 1984

General characteristics
- Class & type: Agile-class minesweeper
- Displacement: 620 long tons (630 t)
- Length: 172 ft (52 m)
- Beam: 36 ft (11 m)
- Draft: 10 ft (3.0 m)
- Propulsion: 2 × General Motors8278A diesel engines; 2 × shafts; 2 × controllable pitch propellers
- Speed: 12 knots (22 km/h; 14 mph)
- Complement: 74
- Armament: 1 × 40 mm gun

USS Dash (AM-428) was an Agile-class minesweeper of the United States Navy. Laid down on 2 July 1951 by the Astoria Marine Construction Co., Astoria, Oregon and launched on 20 September 1952 by Astoria Marine Construction Company, the ship was commissioned on 14 August 1953, and reclassified as an Ocean Minesweeper, MSO-428, 7 February 1955.

== North Atlantic operations ==
Sailing from San Diego, California on 12 June 1954 Dash arrived at Charleston, South Carolina on 6 July. She sailed out of Charleston on local duty and for refresher training at Key West, Florida, until 4 January 1956 when she got underway with her division for a tour of duty in the Mediterranean with the U.S. 6th Fleet. She returned to Charleston on 11 June.

Dash served in the Mediterranean again between 1 May and 2 October 1957, and between 27 April and 27 August 1959. Through 1962, she operated along the east coast and in the Caribbean in amphibious and mine warfare exercises.

== Decommissioning ==
Dash was decommissioned on 2 October 1982, and sold for scrap on 26 January 1984 to Wayne Hobbs of Huntington, California, for $22,229.
