= USC&GS E. Lester Jones =

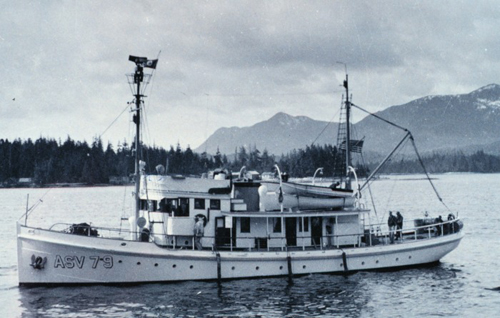
- USC&GS E. Lester Jones (ASV-79)

History

United States
- Name: E. Lester Jones
- Namesake: Ernest Lester Jones (1876–1929), Superintendent (1915–1919) and Director (1919–1929) of the United States Coast and Geodetic Survey
- Owner: United States Coast and Geodetic Survey (1940-1967)
- Operator: United States Coast and Geodetic Survey (1940-1967)
- Builder: Astoria Marine Construction Company, Astoria, Oregon
- Completed: 1940
- Commissioned: 1940
- Decommissioned: 1967
- Renamed: MV Summer Wind
- Home port: Seattle, Washington
- Identification: MMSI number: 303671000; Callsign: WDD2258
- Fate: Sold 1971

General characteristics
- Type: Survey ship
- Tonnage: 128
- Length: 88 ft (27 m)
- Beam: 21 ft (6.4 m)
- Draft: 8 ft (2.4 m)
- Propulsion: Twin Cooper Bessemer EN-6 medium speed diesel engines
- Complement: 3 officers, 12 men

USC&GS E. Lester Jones (ASV-79) was a survey ship that served in the United States Coast and Geodetic Survey Pacific service, mainly in Alaskan surveys, from 1940 to 1967. The vessel was built by Astoria Marine Construction Company at Astoria, Oregon, completed and entered Coast and Geodetic Survey service in 1940. E. Lester Jones was of wooden construction, 88 ft (26.8 m) in length, 21 ft (6.4 m) beam with 8 ft (2.4 m) draft and displacement of 150 tons. The 1941 assigned call letters were WETH.

Astoria Marine Construction Company won the bid submitted on August 18, 1938 for construction to a design by H. C. Hanson of Seattle, who later designed sister ship Patton. Astoria Marine planned to build the vessel with treated timber obtained from the Creosote Western Company whose owner put money toward a construction bond. The actual cost of construction was $22,540.58 above the contract price which led to a legal dispute over tax losses. Astoria Marine, with construction of this vessel, became the first company to use all pressure treated wood in construction of a wooden vessel as well as proving it could fulfill government contracts leading to wartime construction of wooden vessels. The site was listed 8 January 2014 on the National Register of Historic Places due to its World War II and Korean War construction and repair work.

The new vessel was a replacement for the survey vessel Helianthus to act as a tender to the larger survey vessels operating in Alaskan surveys. The contract called for a vessel capable of accommodating three officers and twelve men. The contract included $4,800 for Wolmanizing all fir lumber. To avoid removal of treated wood surfaces in construction the individual pieces were first shaped and then treated 30 miles from the building site. The hull was divided into five watertight compartments by four steel bulkheads. Construction began in February 1939 with a planned launch date of January 29, 1940. The yard's practice was to complete the vessel ashore, including installing main engines before hull planking was complete so that the survey vessel would be effectively deliverable on launch.

During E. Lester Jones′s first field season in 1940, she operated in the Aleutian Islands westward from Umnak Island, conducting surveys with the new large survey ship USC&GS Explorer (OSS 28).

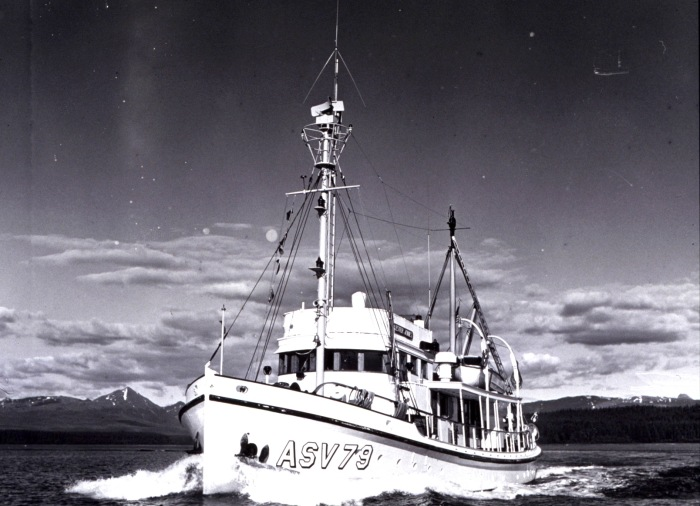
E. Lester Jones underway.

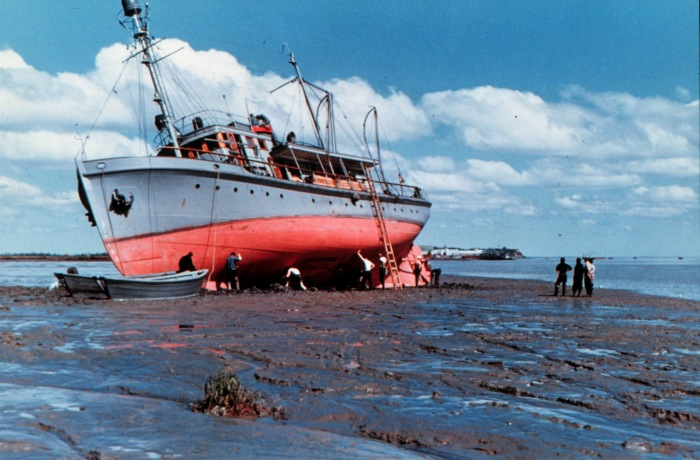
E. Lester Jones aground on the mudflats of the Nushagak River in Alaska, ca. 1950.

E. Lester Jones was retired in 1967 and sold at auction in 1971, After a brief cruising period the vessel was sold to Dave Updike of Seattle, who owned the ship until his death twenty years later, when it was acquired by the current owners. Under the name Summer Wind, the vessel is operated as a liveaboard and cruising yacht. She is currently based in Seattle and is called the Summer Wind. The original Cooper-Bessemer direct reversing main propulsion engines are still operating and in excellent shape.
