= NOAAS Oregon II =

American fisheries research vessel

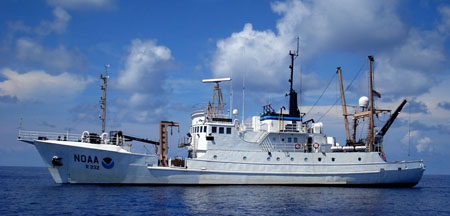
- NOAAS Oregon II (R 332) in 2007.

History

Bureau of Commercial Fisheries
- Name: US FWS Oregon II
- Namesake: US FWS Oregon (FWS 1600), Fish and Wildlife Service research vessel
- Builder: Ingalls Shipyard, Pascagoula, Mississippi
- Launched: February 1967
- Acquired: August 1967 (delivery)
- Commissioned: Never
- Identification: Call sign WTDO
- Fate: Transferred to National Oceanic and Atmospheric Administration 3 October 1970

National Oceanic and Atmospheric Administration
- Name: NOAAS Oregon II (R 332)
- Namesake: Previous name retained
- Acquired: Transferred from Bureau of Commercial Fisheries 3 October 1970
- Commissioned: 17 March 1977
- Home port: Pascagoula, Mississippi
- Identification: IMO number: 6728068; MMSI number: 303967000; Call sign: WTDO
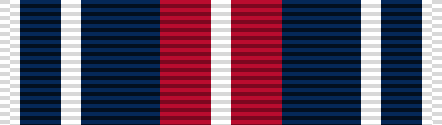
- Honors and awards: Department of Commerce Gold Medal (1999, 2024)
- Status: Active

General characteristics
- Type: Fisheries research ship
- Tonnage: 703 gross tons; 228 net tons
- Displacement: 729 tons
- Length: 170 ft (52 m)
- Beam: 34 ft (10 m)
- Draft: 15 ft (4.6 m)
- Depth: 24.1 ft (7.3 m)
- Propulsion: Originally: Two Fairbanks Morse 800-hp (597-kW) diesel engines, one four-bladed controllable-pitch propeller; Later: Two Caterpillar 900-hp (671-kW) diesel engines, one four-bladed controllable-pitch propeller, one Hundested 250-hp (186-kW) bow thruster
- Speed: 12 knots (22 km/h) (maximum); 11 knots (20 km/h) (maximum sustained); 10 knots (19 km/h) (cruising)
- Range: 7,810 nautical miles (14,460 km)
- Endurance: 33 days
- Boats & landing craft carried: 1 x 18.2-foot (5.5 m) rescue boat
- Complement: 19 (5 NOAA Corps officers and no licensed mates, 3 licensed engineers, and 11 other crew members), plus up to 12 scientists.

NOAAS Oregon II (R 332) is an American fisheries research vessel in commission in the National Oceanic and Atmospheric Administration (NOAA) fleet since 1977. Prior to her NOAA career, she was delivered to the United States Fish and Wildlife Service's Bureau of Commercial Fisheries in 1967 as US FWS Oregon II, but not commissioned. She was transferred to NOAA in 1970, but was not placed in commission until 1977.

== Construction and commissioning ==
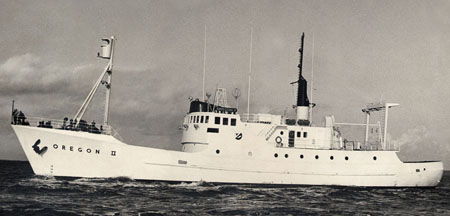
US FWS Oregon II as she appeared when delivered to the United States Fish and Wildlife Service Bureau of Commercial Fisheries in 1967.

Oregon II was built for the U.S. Fish and Wildlife Service at Ingalls Shipyard in Pascagoula, Mississippi. She was launched in February 1967 and delivered to the Fish and Wildlife Service's Bureau of Commercial Fisheries in August 1967 as US FWS Oregon II, but was not commissioned. When NOAA was established on 3 October 1970, she became part of NOAA's fleet, and finally was commissioned on 17 March 1977, as NOAAS Oregon II (R 332).

== Characteristics and capabilities ==
Oregon II is outfitted as a double-rigged shrimp trawler, longliner, gillnetter, fish trap hauler, and dredger. She has a hydraulic seine-trawl winch with a maximum pull of 30,000 pounds (13,610 kg) and drum capacity of 1,200 feet (370 meters) of 9/16-inch (14.3-mm) wire rope, and she has two outriggers for trawling. She also has two hydrographic winches with 0.322-inch (8.2-mm) EM cable, a hydraulic one with a maximum pull of 3,000 pounds (1,400 kg) and a drum capacity of 12,139 feet (3,700 meters), and an electric one with a drum capacity of 13,123 feet (4,000 meters). She also has a self-contained hydraulic MOCNESS winch for the collection of zooplankton and nekton with a maximum pull weight of 3,000 pounds (1,400 kg) and a drum capacity of 7,972 feet (2,430 meters) of 0.68-inch (17.3-mm) wire rope. She is equipped with a rotating telescoping boom crane with a lift capacity of 3,000 pounds (1,400 kg), a rotating crane with a lift capacity of 6,000 pounds (2,700 kg), and a J-frame with a maximum safe working load of 3,500 pounds (1,600 kg).

Oregon II has various laboratory capabilities. A 275-square-foot (25.5-square-meter) wet laboratory is situated aft on her main deck. She also has a 100-square-foot (9.3-square-meter) biology laboratory, a 75-square-foot (7-square-meter) computer laboratory, and a 210-square-foot (19.5-square-meter) hydrographic laboratory. She has a scientific freezer forward.

Oregon II carries an 18.2-foot (5.5-meter) rescue boat with a 90-horsepower (67-kW) motor and capable of carrying six people. Her crew includes a four-member dive team.

Oregon II has undergone an upgrade in which she received new electronic fish detection equipment, environmental sensors, and deck-handling and electronics equipment. Her laboratory and living spaces were refurbished, her original Fairbanks Morse main engines were replaced by new, more powerful Caterpillar engines, and a bow thruster was added to improve both her station-keeping and shiphandling capability.

== Service history ==
Operated by NOAA's Office of Marine and Aviation Operations, Oregon II conducts fishery and living marine resource studies in support of the research of the National Marine Fisheries Service (NMFS) Pascagoula Laboratory in Pascagoula. The ship collects fish and crustacean specimens using trawls and benthic longlines and fish larvae, fish eggs, and plankton using plankton nets and surface and midwater larval nets. She normally operates in the Gulf of Mexico, the Atlantic Ocean off the southeastern United States, and the Caribbean Sea. Her home port is Pascagoula.

Oregon II's projects include summer and autumn groundfish surveys, summer shark longline surveys, and surveys of ichthyoplankton, marine mammals, and reef fish. She annually supports a striped bass survey and tagging effort by NMFS's Beaufort Laboratory in Beaufort, North Carolina.

On 16 March 1989, an engine fire broke out aboard Oregon II while she was moored at Mobile, Alabama. Her chief engineer, Mr. James V. Brosh, entered the smoke-filled engine room to make sure it was clear of personnel before discharging carbon dioxide into the area to fight the fire. He later personally directed Mobile Fire Department firefighters in extinguishing the blaze. His actions were credited with limiting the damage and saving the ship, and for his courage and heroism in ensuring the safety of personnel and in fighting the fire, he received the Department of Commerce Silver Medal later in 1989.

In August 1998, Oregon II became the first United States Government ship to call at Havana, Cuba, since Fidel Castro took control of the country in 1959. She visited Cuba to take part with NOAA's Cuban counterparts in a survey of sharks in Cuban waters to help determine shark migration patterns in the waters of the United States, Cuba, and Mexico. Her work in Cuba supplemented similar work done in Mexican waters.

On 28 February 1999, Oregon II was 25 nautical miles (46 kilometres) off Cape Canaveral, Florida, bound for Pascagoula when she sighted two men and a woman clinging to a capsized 25-foot (7.6-meter) fishing boat in growing darkness and 6-to-8-foot (1.8-to-2.4-meter) seas. The three people had been unable to send any distress signal, had been in the water for about five hours, were beginning to suffer hypothermia, and were in real danger of perishing during the upcoming night when Oregon II rescued them. Oregon II transferred them to a United States Coast Guard cutter, which returned them to shore. For vigilant watchstanding and promptly rescuing the three people, Oregon II received the Department of Commerce Gold Medal in 1999.

When NOAA retired the fisheries research ship NOAAS John N. Cobb (R 552) in August 2008, Oregon II became the oldest ship in the NOAA fleet. She achieved a milestone on 27 July 2012, when she departed Pascagoula on her 300th research cruise, an annual assessment of red snapper and shark populations in the Gulf of Mexico and western Atlantic Ocean. By that time, she had logged 10,000 days at sea and more than 1,000,000 nautical miles (1,900,000 kilometres), and her projects had taken her as far south as the Amazon River delta in Brazil and as far north as Cape Cod, Massachusetts.

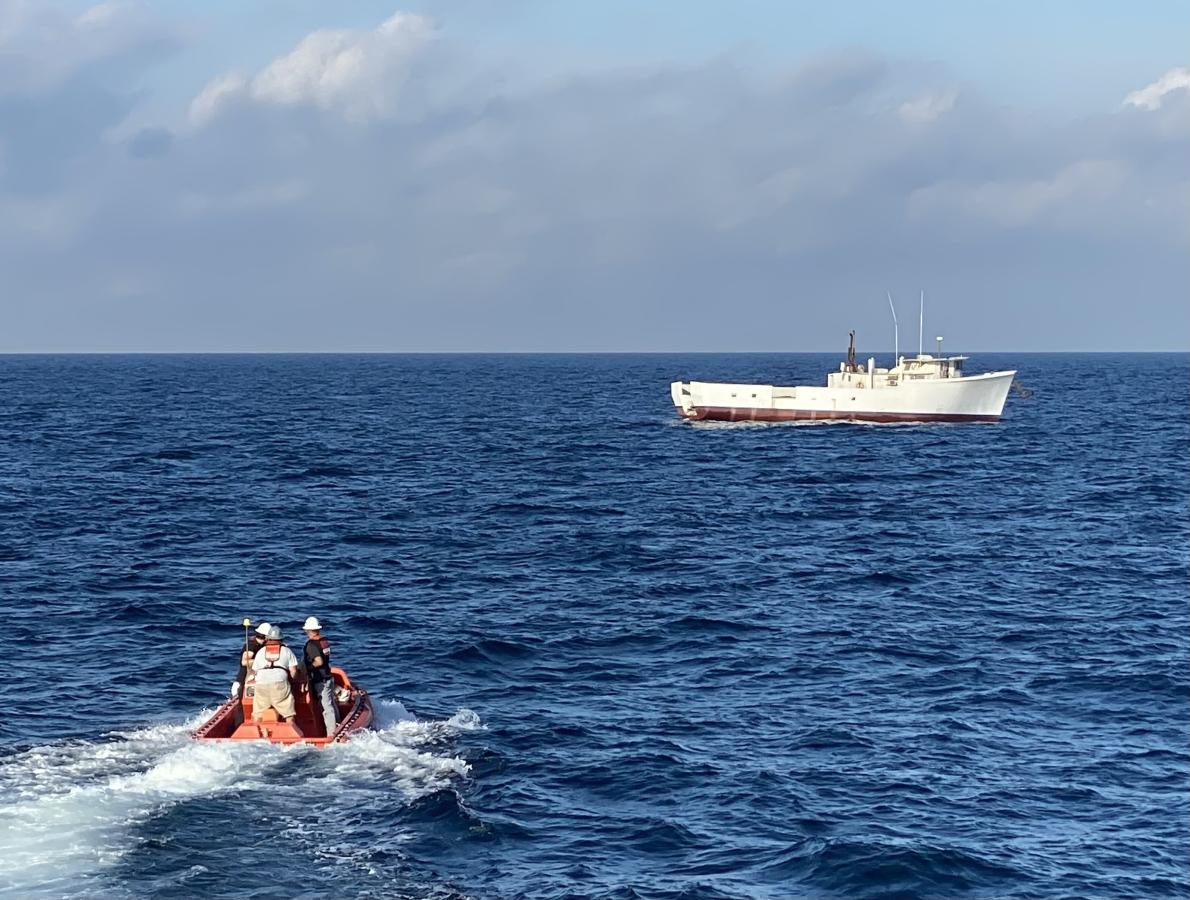
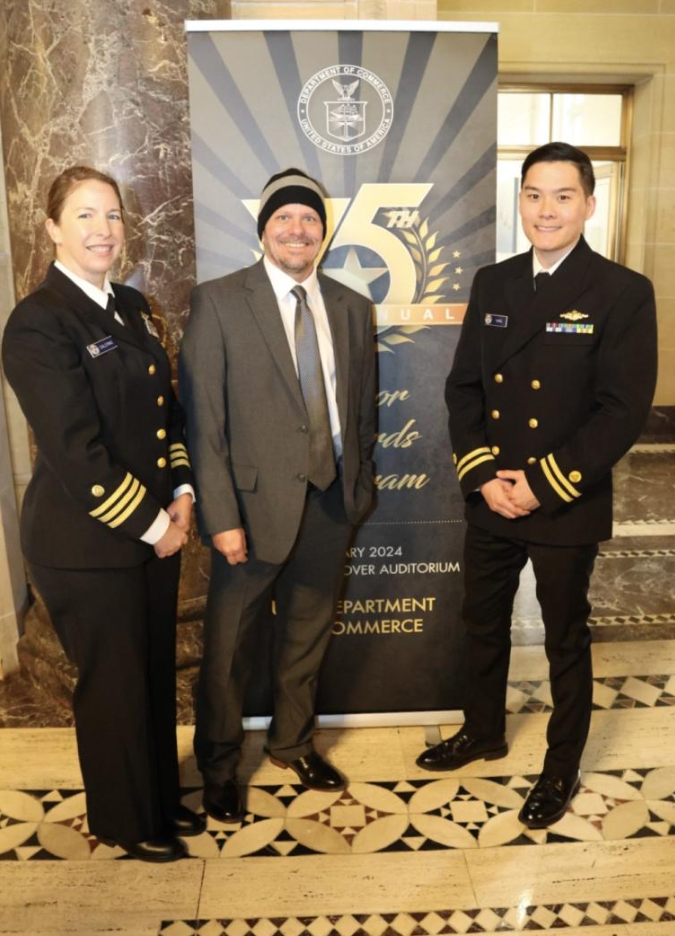
LEFT: A team from Oregon II in a small boat heads toward a vessel in distress to provide assistance in the Gulf of Mexico off Pascagoula, Mississippi, on 16 October 2022. RIGHT: Crew members of NOAAS Ronald H. Brown (R 104), Oregon II, and NOAAS Thomas Jefferson (S 222) at a ceremony on 6 February 2024 at United States Department of Commerce headquarters in Washington, D.C., to accept the Department of Commerce Gold Medal on behalf of their ships for lifesaving achievements.

On 16 October 2022 Oregon II was preparing for arrival at Pascagoula when she heard a radio distress call from a nearby vessel and changed course to assist. The vessel was taking on water and without power, as a result of which her pumps did not work. Oregon II launched her fast rescue boat, which took a team to the vessel that managed to stop the flooding, restore the vessel’s power, and help pump out the vessel, saving her from sinking. For their role in assisting the disabled vessel, Oregon II and her crew received the Department of Commerce Gold Medal in a ceremony at United States Department of Commerce headquarters in Washington, D.C., on 6 February 2024.

== Honors and awards ==
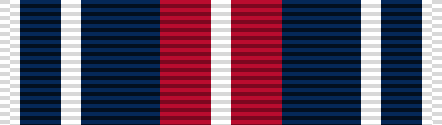
Department of Commerce Gold Medal (1999 and 2024)

In a ceremony in 1999 in Washington, D.C., Oregon II was awarded the Department of Commerce Gold Medal for "public service or heroism" for her lifesaving efforts off Florida on 28 February 1999. The program for the ceremony cited her achievement as follows:

The NOAA Ship OREGON II is recognized for the rescue of two men and one woman whose 25-foot boat capsized in heavy weather off the Florida coast. By the time the OREGON II found them, the hapless mariners had been in the water for about five hours and had begun to suffer the debilitating effects of hypothermia. With darkness falling and the vessel drifting helplessly in the Gulf Stream and authorities unaware of their situation or their position, the three would almost surely have perished were it not for the vigilant watchstanding and prompt rescue efforts of the OREGON II.

== See also ==
- NOAA ships and aircraft
