= USS Osprey (AMS-28) =

Minesweeper of the United States Navy

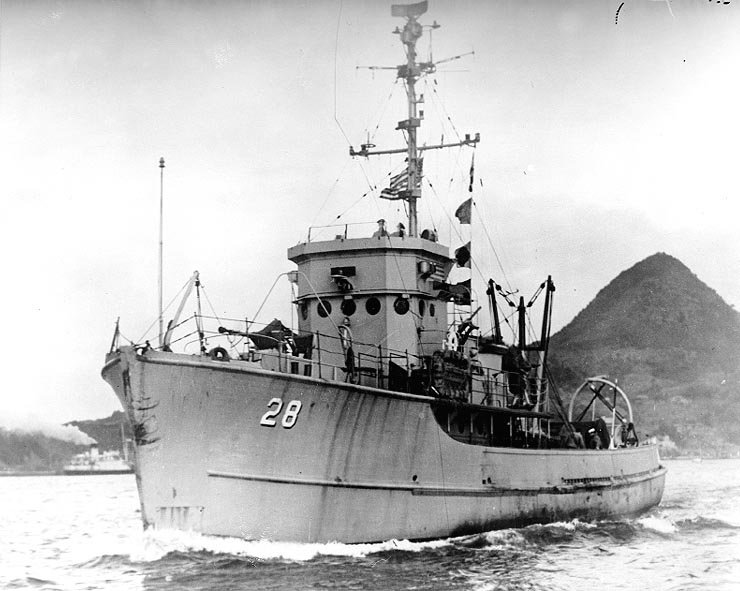

History

United States
- Operator: US Navy
- Ordered: as USS YMS-422
- Builder: Astoria Marine Construction
- Laid down: 9 October 1943
- Launched: 1 June 1944
- Commissioned: 27 September 1944
- Decommissioned: post-Korean War
- Stricken: 15 June 1969
- Fate: Loaned to Japan, 22 March 1955; Sold for scrap, 1969

Japan
- Name: JDS Yakushima (MSC-658)
- Acquired: 22 March 1955

General characteristics
- Displacement: 270 tons
- Length: 136 ft (41 m)
- Beam: 24 ft 6 in (7.47 m)
- Draught: 10 ft (3.0 m)
- Speed: 13 knots
- Complement: 34
- Armament: one 3 in (76 mm) gun mount, two 20 mm machine guns, two depth charge tracks

USS Osprey (AMS-28/YMS-422) was a YMS-1-class minesweeper of the YMS-135 subclass built for the United States Navy during World War II. She was the third U.S. Navy ship to be named for the osprey.

== History ==
YMS-422 was laid down 9 October 1943 at the Astoria Marine Construction, Astoria, Oregon; launched 1 June 1944; sponsored by Mrs. Charles S. Harper, Jr.; and commissioned 27 September 1944.

=== World War II service ===
YMS-422 patrolled off the California coast until reporting for duty with the Hawaiian Sea Frontier early in January 1945. Patrol activities interspersed with minesweeping training absorbed her time until mid-summer when she sailed to the western Pacific Ocean. The approaching end of the war would not and did not end the need for vessels of this type. The removal of minefields around the Japanese home island of Honshū provided the first extensive test of YMS-422's skill at this hazardous work. Operations commenced at Nagoya 18 October, continued at Kobe in December, and this craft was still partially engaged with this task at the outbreak of the Korean War in 1950.

=== Korean War service ===
Previously named and designated Osprey (AMS-28), 17 February 1947, this wooden-hulled ship now sailed to help confront this latest communist advance. Osprey made a pre-assault sweep at Pohang 14 July 1950 to clear the way for the 1st Cavalry Division. On 15 September, her sweeps prepared a firing base anchorage for the main 16" guns of the battleship USS Missouri (BB-63) at the highly-successful Inchon landings.

The following month, while engaged in clearing Wonsan Bay, North Korea, two sister ships struck mines and sank. One year later, again at Wonsan, and again operating under enemy fire, she suffered 3 shell hits, 29 October which necessitated a brief retirement to Japan. Upon returning, she continued to seek out and fire on enemy targets ashore. Her record-breaking performance in mine destruction earned medals and promotions for members of the ship's company. Her high performance continued until negotiations produced a truce 27 July 1953.

Osprey, redesignated MSC(O), 7 February 1955, was destined to conclude her career in the Far East. Loaned to the Japanese Maritime Self Defense Force, 22 March 1955, she served as Yakushima (YTE-10) until 1969. Declared surplus to the needs of both the Japanese and United States' navies, she was struck from the Navy Directory 15 June 1969.

== Awards and honors ==
YMS-422, received 2 battle stars for post-World War II operations and, as AMS-28, 10 battle stars for Korean War service.
