= USS Minah (AMc-204) =

Minesweeper of the United States Navy

History

United States
- Name: USS PCS-1465
- Ordered: as PC-1465
- Reclassified: PCS-1465, 8 April 1943
- Builder: Astoria Marine Construction Co.; Astoria, Oregon
- Laid down: 17 June 1943
- Launched: December 1943
- Commissioned: 15 February 1944
- Renamed: Minah (AMc-204), 10 January 1945
- Namesake: the myna bird (variant spelling)
- Reclassified: AMCU-14, 7 March 1952
- Refit: April 1952, New York Naval Shipyard
- Reclassified: MHC-14, 7 February 1955
- Decommissioned: September 1959
- Stricken: 1 November 1959
- Honors and awards: 1 battle star, World War II
- Fate: Sold, 8 September 1960

General characteristics
- Class & type: PCS-1376-class minesweeper
- Displacement: 280 tons
- Length: 136 ft (41 m)
- Beam: 23 ft 4 in (7.11 m)
- Draft: 8 ft 7 in (2.62 m)
- Propulsion: Two 1,000bhp General Motors 8-268A diesel engines, two shafts.
- Speed: 14.1 knots (26.1 km/h)
- Complement: 54
- Armament: 1 × 3"/50 caliber gun mount; 1 × 40 mm guns; 4 × 20 mm guns; 2 × depth charge tracks; 2 × depth charge projectors; 2 × rockets

USS PCS-1465 was a PCS-1376-class minesweeper built for the United States Navy during World War II. Late in the war she was renamed and reclassified Minah (AMc-204), and in the 1950s reclassified first as AMCU-14 and later as MHC-14. Named for the myna under a variant spelling, she was the only U.S. Navy ship of that name.

== History ==
PCS‑1465 was laid down 17 June 1943 by Astoria Marine Construction Co. of Astoria, Oregon; launched 27 December 1943; commissioned 15 February 1944.

Assigned to commander western sea frontier, PCS 1465 patrolled and trained off the west coast until late in December 1944. Sailing to Pearl Harbor she underwent conversion to an underwater location vessel and consequently 10 January 1945 was armed and redesignated Minah (AMc 204).

Following an appropriate training period she departed on 7 July in company with other coastal minesweepers for Okinawa. While steaming beyond Saipan on the last leg of her voyage hostilities ceased. Peace focused attention on the need to clear harbor areas for the restoration of commerce and in Japan to gain access for the occupation forces. Operating until 8 September around the Okinawa area, Minah then sailed to Japan and assisted in clearing mines from Sasebo Harbor. Later steaming into Pusan, Korea, on 5 October, she supervised Japanese minesweeping operations. While on this duty AMc-204 rescued the crew of a Japanese destroyer which struck a mine and sank and also employed her divers in checking previously sunken ships. Additional underwater location assignments were performed at Kure Harbor before departing Korean waters on 15 January 1946.

En route to the United States Minah sailed via Bikini Atoll where from 8 to 25 March she helped prepare the area for the atomic testing of Operation Crossroads.

Arriving San Pedro, California, 15 May she was soon assigned to the Commander Mine Force, Atlantic Fleet, and transferred her base of operations to Charleston, South Carolina, by 21 July. Demobilization policies curtailed the ship's movements until April 1947 when she undertook a series of BuShips projects in the Norfolk and Yorktown areas. The following 4 years were spent assisting the Naval Mine Countermeasure Station at Panama City, Florida.

Redesignated AMCU-14 on 7 March 1952 Minah proceeded to New York Navy Yard in April, one of 31 minesweepers to be converted. Local operations out of Little Creek, Virginia, and Key West, Florida, preceded a final redesignation of MHC-14 on 7 February 1955. She engaged in projects of the Operational Development Force and saw service within the 6th Naval District before she decommissioned in Florida, September 1959. Briefly berthed with Atlantic Reserve Fleet, her name was stricken from the Navy list on 1 November 1959. She was sold to William J. Kleb and removed from Naval custody on 8 September 1960.

== Awards and honors ==
USS Minah (AMc-204) received one battle star for her World War II service.
