= Onversaagd-class minesweeper =

Ship class of minehunters

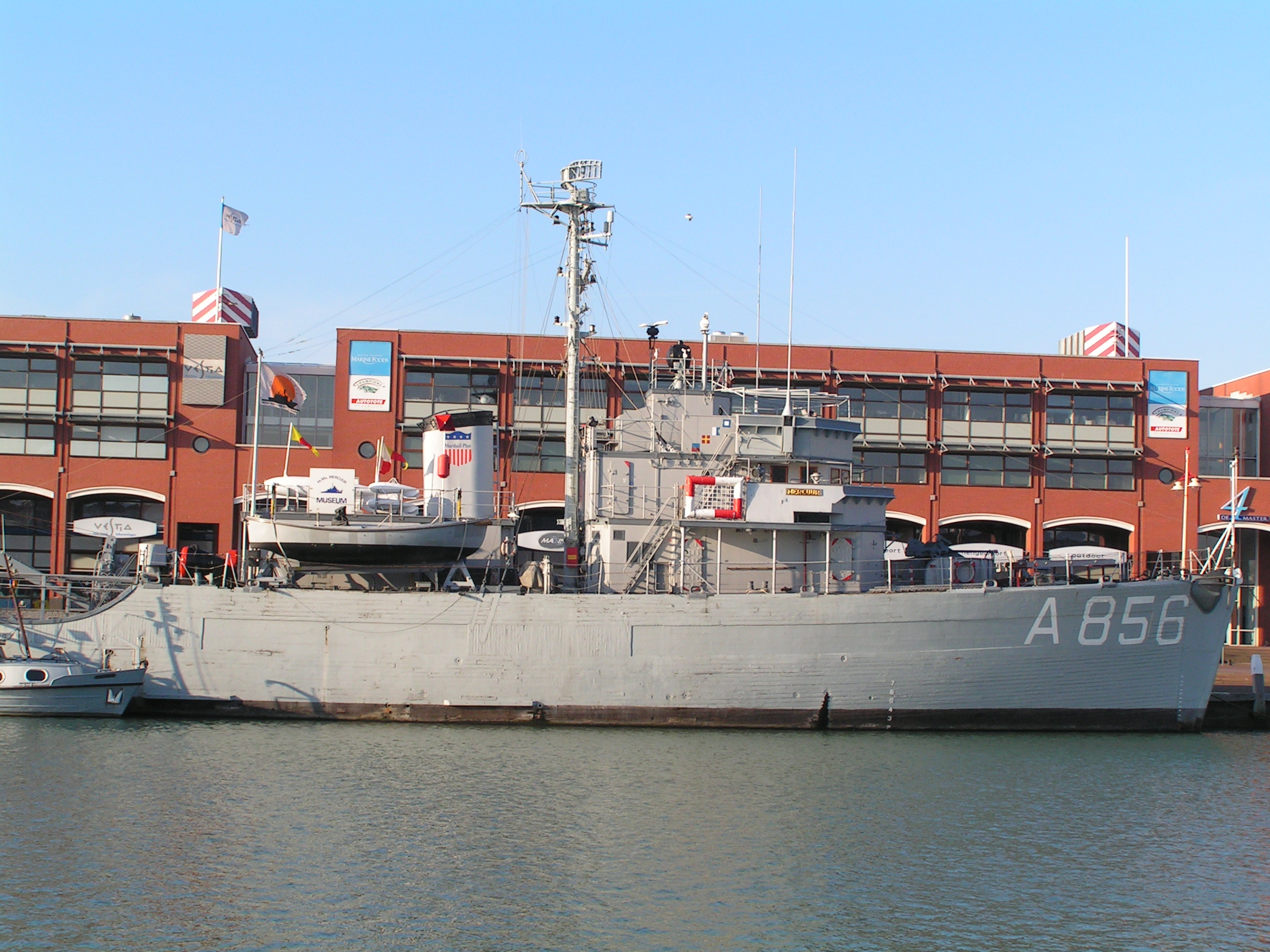
- Onverschrokken

Class overview
- Name: Onversaagd class
- Builders: Astoria Marine Construction, Astoria, Oregon; Boston Naval Shipyard, Boston, Massachusetts; Peterson Builders, Sturgeon Bay, Wisconsin
- Operators: Royal Netherlands Navy
- Built: 1952–1955
- In commission: 1954–1987
- Planned: 6
- Completed: 6
- Scrapped: 5
- Preserved: 1

General characteristics
- Type: Minesweeper
- Displacement: 750 t (740 long tons)
- Length: 50.29 m (165 ft 0 in)
- Beam: 10.67 m (35 ft 0 in)
- Draft: 2.80 m (9 ft 2 in)
- Propulsion: 2 propellers; 1,600 hp (1,200 kW); 2 x General Motors diesel engines
- Speed: 15.5 knots (28.7 km/h; 17.8 mph)
- Crew: 72
- Armament: 1 x 40 mm gun

The Onversaagd class was a ship class of six minesweepers that were built in the United States for the Royal Netherlands Navy (RNN). They were paid for by the United States under the Mutual Defense Assistance Program (MDAP). The minesweepers were based on the design of the Aggressive class and taken into service of the RNN between 1954 and 1955.

== Design ==
To sweep naval mines the minesweepers of the Onversaagd class were equipped with the Wire Mk1, M Mk 6 A, A Mk 6B and the A Mk 4v. Furthermore, the ships had a single 40 mm gun. In addition, the minesweepers were equipped with a prototype of the UQS-1, but this mine avoidance sonar did not meet expectations.

While the Onversaagd-class minesweepers had a range of 2,200 nautical miles (4,100 km; 2,500 mi), it was deemed insufficient, as it meant that the ships could only stay at sea for a maximum of eight to nine days without having to replenish its oil.

== Ships in class ==
Onversaagd-class construction data
Hull number	Name	Builder	Laid down	Launched	Commissioned	Decommissioned	Fate	Notes
M884 / A854	Onversaagd ¹	Astoria Marine Construction	24 September 1952	4 November 1953	27 May 1954	23 July 1976	Sold for scrap to Liguria Maritime Ltd. in 1979	
M885 / A855	Onbevreesd ²	Astoria Marine Construction	8 December 1952	7 November 1953	21 September 1954	28 May 1982		
M886 / A856	Onverschrokken ³	Peterson Builders	19 February 1952	17 January 1953	22 Juli 1954	12 February 1987	Museum ship in Vlissingen	
M887 / A857	Onvermoeid ²	Boston Naval Shipyard	27 February 1953	2 May 1953	23 September 1954	1 October 1971	Sold for scrap to Ross & Sons in 1975	
M888 / A858	Onvervaard ²	Astoria Marine Construction	11 April 1952	6 March 1954	31 January 1955	26 April 1968	Sold for scrap to Deans Marine Ltd. in 1983	
M889 / A859	Onverdroten ²	Peterson Builders	17 February 1952	22 August 1953	22 November 1954	26 February 1965	Sold for scrap to the firm Mantel in 1984	

- ¹ = later rebuild as hydrographic survey vessel
- ² = later rebuild as mine clearance support vessel
- ³ = later rebuild as Submarine support vessel
