= NOAAS Oregon =

American fisheries research vessel

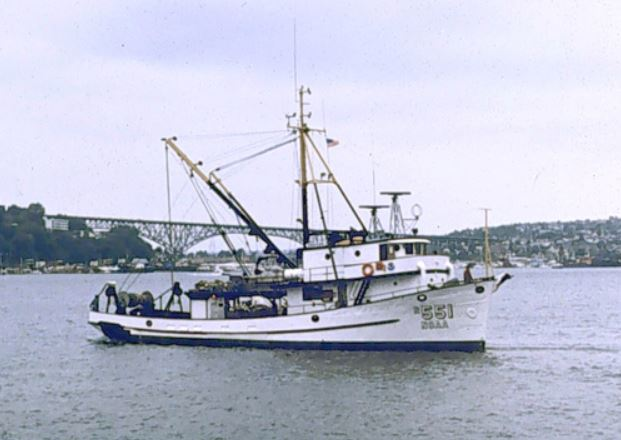
- NOAAS Oregon (R 551)

History

U.S. Fish and Wildlife Service
- Name: US FWS Oregon (FSW 1600)
- Namesake: Oregon
- Builder: Gunderson Brothers, Portland, Oregon; Astoria Marine Construction Company, Astoria, Oregon
- Launched: 1946
- Acquired: 1949
- Home port: Seattle, Washington (1949); Pascagoula, Mississippi (1950–1967); St. Simons Island, Georgia (1967–1969); Juneau, Alaska (1969–1970); Kodiak, Alaska (1970)
- Fate: Transferred to National Oceanic and Atmospheric Administration 3 October 1970

National Oceanic and Atmospheric Administration
- Name: NOAAS Oregon (FRV 51)
- Namesake: Previous name retained
- Acquired: Transferred from U.S. Fish and Wildlife Service 3 October 1970
- Decommissioned: 1980
- Reclassified: From "fisheries research vessel" (FRV 51) to "research ship" (R 551)
- Home port: Kodiak, Alaska
- Identification: IMO number: 7738448; MMSI number: 368699000; Callsign: WBD9261
- Fate: Sold 20 October 1980; extant 2014
- Notes: Formally incorporated into NOAA fleet in 1973

General characteristics
- Type: Fisheries research ship
- Tonnage: 219 GT
- Length: 100 ft (30 m)
- Beam: 26 ft (7.9 m)
- Draft: 14 ft (4.3 m)
- Propulsion: Enterprise engine, 600 hp (450 kW)
- Speed: 9 knots (17 km/h) (average)
- Range: 4,800 nmi (8,900 km)

NOAAS Oregon (R 551), previously NOAAS Oregon (FRV 51), was an American fisheries research vessel in commission in the National Oceanic and Atmospheric Administration (NOAA) fleet from 1970 to 1980. Prior to her NOAA career, she operated under the United States Fish and Wildlife Service from 1949 to 1970 as US FWS Oregon (FWS 1600).

== Construction ==
Hoping to find a way of overcoming meat protein shortages in the United States during World War II, the U.S. War Food Administration suggested in 1945 that the United States Government fund the construction of exploratory fishing vessels for use in expanding knowledge of the crab and fish resources off the Territory of Alaska that boats chartered by the Fish and Wildlife Service had identified in 1940 and 1941 while exploring the region for economically exploitable king crab populations. In response, the Reconstruction Finance Corporation (RFC) committed US$4,750,000 to fund the construction of four such vessels – named Alaska, California, Oregon, and Washington – as well as the conversion of a fifth, larger ship – Pacific Explorer – to serve as their mother ship and provide services as a factory ship and cargo ship. With the Pacific Exploration Company (PEC) managing the construction work, Gunderson Brothers built Oregon's and Washington's hulls at Portland, Oregon, in 1946, after which the incomplete boats moved to Astoria, Oregon, where the Astoria Marine Construction Company completed their fitting out.

== Characteristics and capabilities ==
Naval architect H. C. Hanson designed the four fishing boats, which were 100 feet (30 m) long. Each had a single mast, a raised deck, and a fully molded round-bottom steel hull with a bilge keel. Oregon and Washington were outfitted as West Coast seiner-draggers. Each of the boats cost approximately US$250,000 to build.

== Service history ==
=== Early career ===
After Astoria Marine Construction completed the boats, the PEC leased them from the RFC for US$50,000 per year and 55% percent of whatever profit they made, and took operational control of them. As part of the agreement for PEC to operate the vessels, the boats went to sea with Fish and Wildlife Service (FWS) agents aboard; the agents observed fishing operations and conducted fisheries science research. Outfitted for bait-fishing, Oregon made her first major deployment in 1948, exploring the North, Central, and South Pacific Ocean for new sources of albacore, accompanied by her sister ship Alaska, which was outfitted as a purse-seiner. Oregon operated in the Hawaiian Islands from August to October 1948, then moved on to the Line Islands and later the Marshall Islands and other island groups in the Trust Territory of the Pacific Islands. During the deployment, Oregon tested new types of fishing gear, and she reported outstanding results during her voyage.

=== Fish and Wildlife Service ===
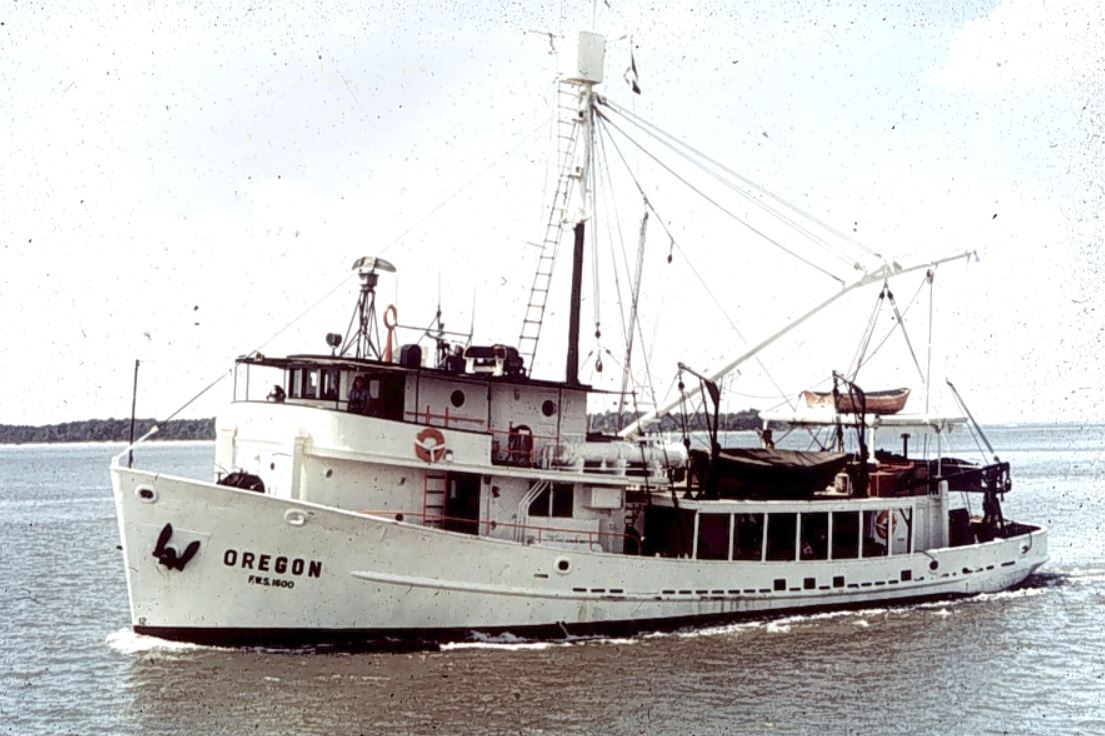
US FWS Oregon (FWS 1600) in service with the Fish and Wildlife Service

In 1949, the Fish and Wildlife Service – an element of the United States Department of the Interior – purchased Oregon from the RFC for a reported US$300,000 and took over operational control of her, placing her in service as US FWS Oregon (FWS 1600). She began her first FWS deployment on 8 August 1949, departing Seattle, Washington, to explore Pacific Ocean waters off Washington, Oregon, and British Columbia for sources of albacore. During her voyage, she engaged in experimental trawling to study the range and distribution of tuna and identify commercially viable tuna fisheries. She notified the local commercial fishing fleet by radio whenever she discovered a large school of tuna and directed the commercial fisherman to the school. She made extensive use of the new LORAN navigation aid during her cruise, becoming the first FWS vessel to use LORAN while assessing fishing conditions. Later in 1949, she moved to the waters off Southeast Alaska, again locating schools of tuna and reporting their positions to commercial fishermen operating in the area.

On 8 December 1949, Oregon departed Seattle for a 27-day voyage to her new home port at the FWS's new Exploratory Fishing and Gear Research (EF&GR) base at Pascagoula, Mississippi, where she arrived on 5 January 1950. She then began a 16-year stint in which she supported EF&GR by exploring the Gulf of Mexico, the Caribbean Sea, and the western Atlantic Ocean as far south as the coast of French Guiana for commercially useful populations of marine life, including bottomfish. Her first cruise from Pascagoula began in April 1950, when she set out in search of commercially exploitable populations of shrimp, red snapper, tuna, menhaden, and shark, based on a recommendation by the Gulf States Marine Fisheries Commission.

In 1956, the Fish and Wildlife Service was renamed the United States Fish and Wildlife Service (USFWS) and reorganized, and under the new organization Oregon became part of the fleet of USFWS's Bureau of Commercial Fisheries. She continued to operate from Pascagoula. In 1964, she took part in the International Cooperative Investigations of the Tropical Atlantic (ICITA) program by collecting hydrographic and biological data and studying surface-schooling fish off South America. From the autumn of 1964 to 1966, she participated in the United Nations Special Fund Caribbean project, making four important exploratory fishing trips in the Caribbean Sea off the Lesser Antilles with United Nations observers and trainees on board. Using longlining, trolling, trawling, and dredging techniques, she caught tuna, swordfish, several species of shark, dwarf herring, silverside, shrimp, scarlet prawns, and lobsterettes, providing the United Nations personnel on board with knowledge of the fishery resources off the Lesser Antilles and experience in the use of fishing gear and techniques that would help in the future exploitation of fisheries in the Caribbean. When Oregon's newly built replacement, Oregon II, joined the FWS fleet in August 1967 with her home port at Pascagoula, Oregon′s home port shifted to St. Simons Island, Georgia, from which she operated for another two years.

In 1969, Oregon returned to Seattle, where she underwent an extensive renovation. With it complete, she moved to her new base at the EF&GR laboratory at Juneau, Alaska, replacing the BCF vessel US FWS John R. Manning. From Juneau, she conducted cruises to test new fishing gear designs and explore the eastern Bering Sea and lower Bristol Bay for commercially useful bottomfish, shrimp, and crab populations. In 1970, she and the laboratory both moved to Kodiak, Alaska.

=== NOAA ===
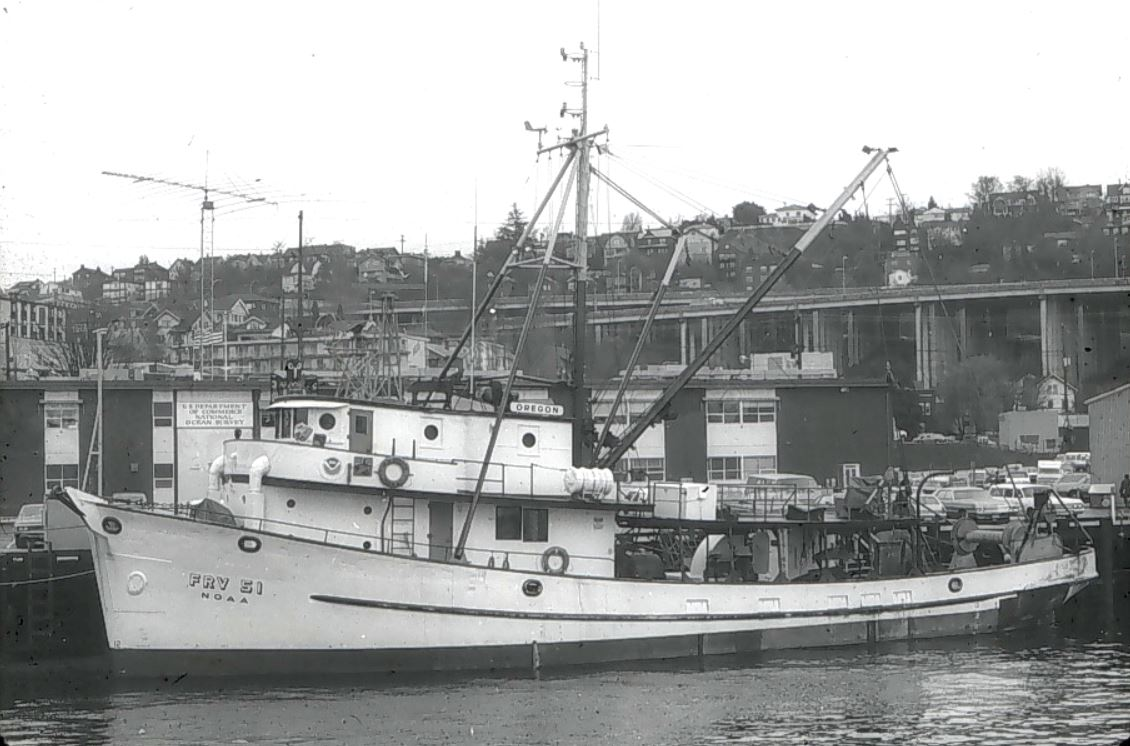
NOAAS Oregon (FRV 51) at Seattle, Washington

On 3 October 1970, a major reorganization occurred which formed the National Oceanic and Atmospheric Administration (NOAA) under the United States Department of Commerce. As part of the reorganization, the Bureau of Commercial Fisheries was removed from the U.S. Fish and Wildlife Service and placed under NOAA, and ships of the Bureau of Commercial Fisheries fleet joined those of the United States Coast and Geodetic Survey in forming the new NOAA fleet. At first, the major ships that were to constitute the new fleet reported to separate entities, with former Coast and Geodetic Survey ships subordinate to the National Ocean Survey (the Coast and Geodetic Survey's successor organization within NOAA), while former Bureau of Commercial Fisheries ships like Oregon reported to the Bureau's successor within NOAA, the National Marine Fisheries Service. During 1972 and 1973, however, the ships of the National Ocean Survey and National Marine Fisheries Service, as well as those of the Environmental Research Laboratories, integrated to form a consolidated and unified NOAA fleet, operated by the National Ocean Survey's Office of Fleet Operations. Oregon herself officially became part of the NOAA fleet in 1973, originally designated NOAAS Oregon (FRV 51) and later redesignated NOAAS Oregon (R 551).

From her transfer to Kodiak in 1970 until 1975, Oregon conducted annual offshore surveys of the Alaskan continental shelf for the Groundfish Assessment Program. In 1976, she began operating in the Bering Sea and Gulf of Alaska in support of the NMFS Resource Assessment Program. NOAA decommissioned Oregon in 1980.

=== Later career ===
On 20 October 1980, NOAA transferred Oregon to the State of South Carolina′s Department of Wildlife and Marine Resources. In the late 1980s, that department sold her into private ownership for $6,000. In April 1991, Jon Franklin purchased her in South Carolina and completely overhauled her there, restoring her to her original configuration. In February 1992, he departed South Carolina aboard Oregon and arrived in the Pacific Northwest after a six-week voyage. Franklin still owned and operated Oregon as of early 2014, and his company, Oregon Seafoods of Lopez Island, Washington, has used her for tuna fishing in the South Pacific off Fiji over the winter of 1997–1998, albacore fishing in the North Pacific off Washington in the autumn of 2001, and bait-fishing and trolling for herring and salmon off Alaska.
