= HNLMS Mercuur (1936) =

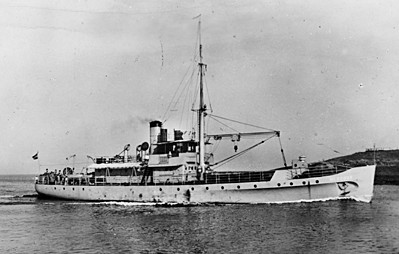
- HNLMS Mercuur

History

Netherlands
- Name: Mercuur
- Namesake: Mercuur
- Builder: Rijkswerf Willemsoord, Den Helder
- Laid down: 1936
- Commissioned: 4 July 1936
- Recommissioned: 1 April 1948, after World War II
- Decommissioned: 15 May 1940, Captured by German forces
- Out of service: 14 April 1972
- Renamed: Merkur (While in German service)
- Fate: Captured by German Forces on 15 May 1940. Recommissioned into Royal Netherlands Navy in 1948.

General characteristics
- Type: submarine tender
- Displacement: 282 t (278 long tons) standard
- Length: 41.9 m (137 ft 6 in)
- Beam: 7.02 m (23 ft 0 in)
- Draught: 2.52 m (8 ft 3 in)
- Installed power: 330 hp (250 kW)
- Propulsion: 1 Werkspoor Triple expansion engine powering a single screw
- Speed: 12 knots (22 km/h; 14 mph)
- Complement: 31
- Armament: 2 × single 12.7 mm (0.50 in)

HNLMS Mercuur was a Royal Netherlands Navy submarine tender. She served as torpedo maintenance and repair ship for Dutch submarines and was based from the Rijkswerf Willemsoord in Den Helder where she was constructed. She was the ninth ship to be named after Merkuur and the third ship of this name to be a submarine/torpedo support ship, continuing a long tradition for the Netherlands Navy.

During the fall of the Netherlands she was captured by German forces and renamed to Merkur (HI 1) where she would continue in the same role serving the Kriegsmarine.

After the Second World War she was found at Rotterdam and was repaired, being recommissioned into the Royal Netherlands Navy in 1948. She continued to serve with the submarine department until 1972 after which she was sold to a private buyer.
