= USS Siskin =

Minesweeper of the United States Navy

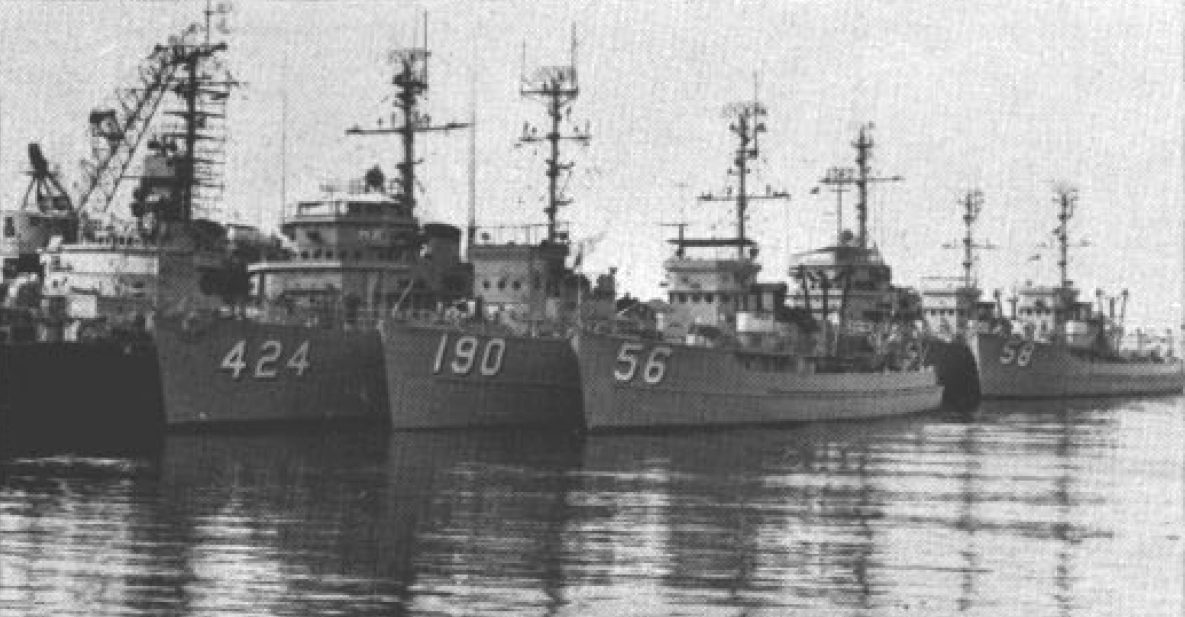
- Siskin with U.S. Mine Division 22, circa 1965

History

United States
- Ordered: as YMS-425
- Laid down: 6 June 1944
- Launched: 9 September 1944
- Commissioned: 21 December 1944
- Decommissioned: 19 July 1946
- In service: March 1950
- Out of service: 24 October 1957
- Stricken: 1 October 1968
- Fate: Sold for scrapping

General characteristics
- Displacement: 320 tons
- Length: 136 ft (41 m)
- Beam: 24 ft 6 in (7.47 m)
- Draught: 6 ft 1 in (1.85 m)
- Speed: 13 knots
- Complement: 33
- Armament: one 3 in (76 mm) gun mount, two 20 mm machine guns

USS Siskin (AMS-58/YMS-425) was a YMS-1-class minesweeper of the YMS-135 subclass built for the United States Navy during World War II. She is the only U.S. Navy ship to be named for the siskin.

== History ==
YMS-425, a motor minesweeper, was laid down on 6 June 1944 by the Astoria Marine Construction Co. at Astoria, Oregon; launched on 9 September 1944; and placed in service on 21 December 1944.

The motor minesweeper conducted training exercises and shakedown along the U.S. West Coast during the spring and early summer of 1945. On 10 August, she departed San Francisco, California, and headed for Pearl Harbor, Hawaii.

She spent 10 days in the Hawaiian Islands before getting underway for Okinawa on the 31st. She stopped at Eniwetok from 12 to 14 September, at Saipan from 19 to 22 September, and made Okinawa on the 28th. From Okinawa, she headed to Japan; and, for the next six months, she operated in Japanese coastal waters, sweeping mines for the occupation forces. YMS-425 completed her part in the minesweeping operation and, on 11 March 1946, shaped a course for the United States.

After stops at Saipan, Eniwetok, Johnston Island, and Pearl Harbor, she entered San Francisco Bay on 7 May. From San Francisco, California, she moved via the Panama Canal to Boston, Massachusetts, arriving there on 7 July 1946. YMS-425 decommissioned on 19 July 1946 and remained at Boston. On 1 September 1947, YMS-425 was renamed Siskin (AMS-58) and was assigned to the 1st Naval District at Boston for duty as a U.S. Naval Reserve training ship.

Siskin recommissioned at Boston in March 1950 under the command of Lt. F. W. Cole. She operated along the southeastern and gulf coasts of the United States, from Norfolk, Virginia, to Panama City, Florida, assigned to Mine Division 42 (MinDiv 42) until January 1954. From January 1954 until January 1955, she was assigned to MinDiv 43 and served with the Naval Mine Countermeasures Station at Panama City, Florida. In November 1954, her homeport was changed to Charleston, South Carolina; and, from January to April 1955, she was overhauled at Norfolk, Virginia. On 7 February 1955, her designation was changed from AMS-58 to MSCO-58. After overhaul, she conducted refresher training, then returned to normal operations along the U.S. East Coast.

Siskin arrived in Buffalo, New York, via the St. Lawrence Seaway, on 17 October 1957. She decommissioned there on 24 October and resumed duty as a Naval Reserve training ship. Later, she was transferred back to the 1st Naval District at Boston, Massachusetts, until 1 October 1968, when her name was struck from the Navy list. She was subsequently sold for scrapping.

== Awards and honors ==
YMS-425 received one battle star.
