= HNLMS Onverschrokken =

Submarine support ship

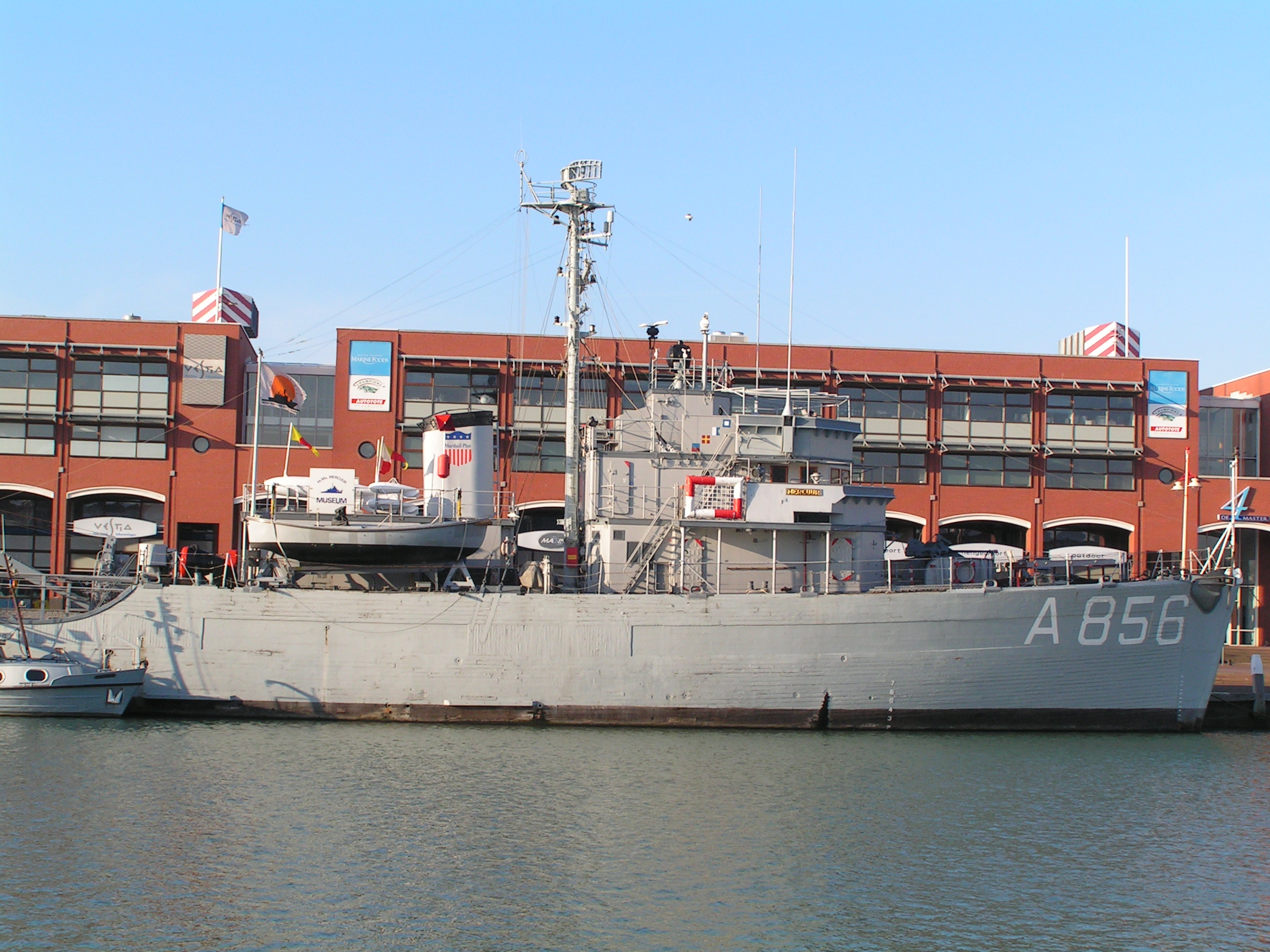
- HNLMS Onverschokken as Mercuur in Scheveningen.

History

Netherlands
- Name: Onverschrokken (1954–1972); Mercuur (1972–1987)
- Builder: Peterson Builders, Inc., Sturgeon Bay, Wisconsin, United States
- Yard number: MSO 483
- Laid down: 16 February 1952
- Launched: 17 February 1953
- Acquired: 22 July 1953
- Commissioned: 22 June 1954; 11 May 1973
- Decommissioned: 1 March 1973; 12 February 1987
- Identification: M886 (1954–1965); A856 (1965–1987)
- Status: Museum ship

General characteristics
- Type: Minesweeper (1954–1965); Submarine support ship (1972–1987)
- Displacement: 750 t (740 long tons)
- Length: 50.29 m (165 ft 0 in)
- Beam: 10.7 m (35 ft 1 in)
- Draught: 2.80 m (9 ft 2 in)
- Propulsion: 2 propellers; 1,600 hp (1,200 kW); 2 x General Motors diesel engines
- Speed: 15.5 knots (28.7 km/h; 17.8 mph)
- Complement: 72
- Armament: 1 x 40 mm gun (removed after conversion to submarine support ship)

HNLMS Onverschrokken (A856), also known as HNLMS Mercuur (A856), was an Onversaagd-class minesweeper of the Royal Netherlands Navy (RNN). Soon after being taken into service of the RNN, the ship was put into reserve alongside the rest of the minesweepers of the Onversaagd class. Later, in 1973 she was renamed as HNLMS Mercuur (A856) and used as submarine support ship till her decommissioning in 1987. Nowadays, she is a museum ship that can be visited in Vlissingen.

== History ==
The former submarine support ship ex HNLMS Mercuur was originally built as HNLMS Onverschrokken, as part of the Aggressive-class wooden ocean minesweepers with the hull number MSO 483. These minesweepers were built in the early 1950s in the United States and were equipped with an AN/SQQ-14 minehunting sonar to locate moored or bottom naval mines. To do this it had electromagnetic cables to set off mines and other cables to cut through their mooring lines, while they were also equipped with devices which could produce magnetic and acoustical charge to let mines explode. The Aggressive class was a large ship class with more than 80 ships. The reason for this many minesweepers was that the United States was in need of minesweepers for clearing mines that were laid during the Korean War by various countries. Most of the minesweepers served for many years in United States Navy and other allied navies. One of these allied navies that employed Aggressive class in their navy was the Royal Netherlands Navy (RNN). The Netherlands was loaned six Aggressive-class minesweepers as part the United States' financial and material aid under the Mutual Defense Assistance Program, among these minesweepers was HNLMS Onverschrokken. The ship arrived in the Netherlands on 22 July 1954 and was given the pendant M886. The ships of the Onverschokken class, including Onverschokken itself, visited many harbors in Netherlands to search and clear sea mines that were left over after the Second World War. Besides these important tasks she could also be seen frequently as part of the Dutch navy delegation that took part in multinational (NATO and bi- or tri-national) exercises off the European coast during the Cold War. In 1965 her role changed from minesweeper to escort ship and at the same time her registration changed from M886 to A856.

Mercuur, which was in service for decades, was barely able to perform her tasks at the beginning of the 1970s due her age and therefore the RNN came to the decision to turn the Onverschrokken into a torpedo support ship. In this role she would support submarines by performing torpedo tests and act as target ship. After her re-design Onverschrokken was renamed Mercuur like her predecessor.

=== Museum ship ===
Mercuur was decommissioned in 1987 after her successor, which was also named Mercuur, was completed. After her decommissioning the ship was loaned in 1988 to the Nautisch Kwartier Amsterdam Foundation. However, this was for a short duration since the foundation could not build a use-case for and she was therefore returned. In 1992 the Foundation for the Conservation of Maritime Monuments (SBMM) agreed to loan the Mercuur docked the ship for decades in the harbor of Scheveningen, where she was turned into a museumship and frequently visited by people all around. a new loan and a mooring place was found in Scheveningen.

In February 2015, the Dutch Ministry of Defense commissioned all museum ships to be investigated for the presence of asbestos. When traces were found on board of Mercuur, the Dutch Ministry of Defense ordered the ship to be closed in anticipation of further decision-making. The Ministry of Defense also decided that it no longer wanted to be the owner and decided that the ship would either be donated to the SBMM, demolished or remediation would take place. Upon acquisition in ownership, a new phase would start for the exploitation of the Mercuur. A number of volunteers decided, partly in view of their age, to stop their efforts and not to start a new phase again. This deprived the SBMM of the possibility of continuing the exploitation with the prospect of success. Based on this, in consultation between the SBMM and the Ministry of Defense, Mercuur was brought to Den Helder in December 2015 with the intention to start the tender for remediation and demolition. In early 2016, contacts were made between the SBMM and the Maritime Heritage Vlissingen Foundation (SMEV) to see whether the ship could serve as a museum ship in Vlissingen after the asbestos removal.

In 2016 the Stichting Maritiem Erfgoed Vlissingen prevented the destruction of the Mercuur when it made a deal with the RNN to get time to develop a business-plan for her as museum ship. After the plan was accepted she was towed to Vlissingen, the RNN helped there with removing the asbestos from the ship and converting her into a museum ship. This conversion was completed in 2017 after which she was towed once again to a different location, this time the dry dock named Dok van Perry where she would spend all her future time from now. The Defense Materiel Organization (DMO) officially transferred HNLMS Mercuur on 1 September 2017 to the Stichting Maritiem Erfgoed Vlissingen (SMEV) which will take care of her as museum ship.
