= USC&GS Patton =

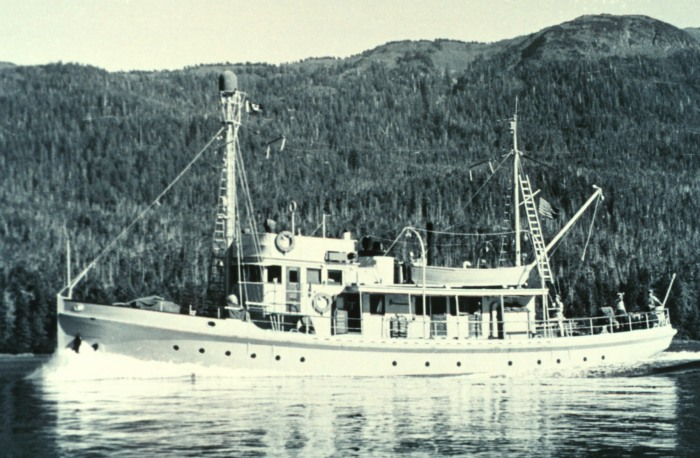
- USC&GS Patton (ASV-80) in southeast Alaska.

History

United States
- Name: Patton
- Namesake: Rear Admiral Raymond Stanton Patton (1882-1937), 12th Director of the U.S. Coast and Geodetic Survey (1929-1937)
- Launched: 1941
- Completed: 1941
- In service: 1941
- Out of service: 1967
- Fate: Sold; became private yacht Gyrfalcon

General characteristics
- Type: Survey ship
- Length: 88 ft (27 m)
- Beam: 21 ft (6.4 m)
- Draft: 8 ft (2.4 m)
- Propulsion: Twin diesel engines

USC&GS Patton (ASV-80) was a survey ship that served in the United States Coast and Geodetic Survey from 1941 to 1967.

Patton was designed for the Coast and Geodetic Survey by H. C. Hanson of Seattle who had also designed sister ship E. Lester Jones. The design became a standard for other agency vessels of the size and type. The ship was built by Silvert Sagstad in 1941 at Sagstad Shipyards, Seattle at a cost of $150,000. The vessel was wooden construction, 88 ft (26.8 m) in length, a 21 ft (6.4 m) beam and 8 ft (2.4 m) draft. Hull construction was of heavy and divided by four watertight bulkheads. Patton was powered by twin six cylinder, 150 horsepower, Cooper-Bessemer diesel engines driving twin 48 in (1.22 m) propellers. Electrical power was by means of two 14 horsepower generating sets. A boiler provided heat for radiators. Survey equipment included a Fathometer with special generator wiring and switchboard.

The vessel was equipped for long range cruising with a range of about 4,500 nmi (5,200 mi; 8,300 km). Crew quarters were forward with wardroom aft. Galley, mess room, washrooms and other accommodations were in the deck house.

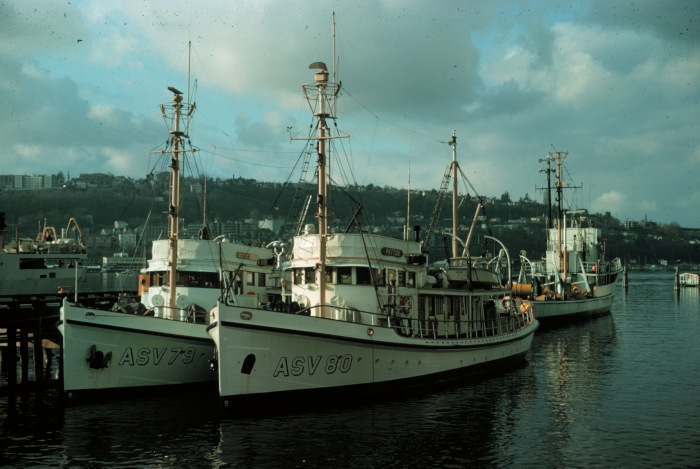
Coast and Geodetic auxiliary survey vessels USC&GS Lester Jones (ASV 79) and Patton, and (at rear) coastal survey vessel USC&GS Hodgson (CSS 26), sometime between 1946 and 1967.

She served in the Pacific during her Survey career, including in Alaskan waters. Patton was retired in 1967 and sold. The ship became the private yacht St Croix then sold as Triton and later renamed Gyrfalcon. She is based in the Seattle, Washington, area.
