= USS Egret (AMS-46) =

Minesweeper of the United States Navy

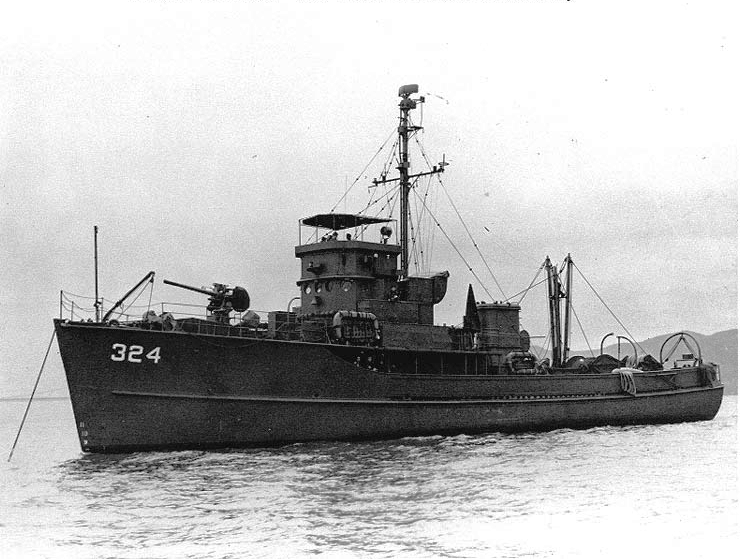
- A YMS-1-class minesweeper

History

United States
- Ordered: as YMS-136
- Laid down: 16 July 1942
- Launched: 8 February 1943
- In service: 19 March 1943
- Out of service: date unknown
- Stricken: 1 November 1959
- Fate: Transferred to Brazil

Brazil
- Name: Jutaí (M12)
- Acquired: 15 August 1960

General characteristics
- Displacement: 320 tons
- Length: 136 ft (41 m)
- Beam: 24 ft 6 in (7.47 m)
- Draught: 6 ft 1 in (1.85 m)
- Speed: 13 knots
- Complement: 33
- Armament: one 3 in (76 mm) gun mount, two 20 mm machine guns

USS Egret (AMS-46/YMS-136) was a YMS-1-class minesweeper of the YMS-135 subclass acquired by the U.S. Navy for the task of removing mines that had been placed in the water to prevent ships from passing.

YMS-136 was built at the Astoria Marine Construction Company, Astoria, Oregon; she was laid down on 16 July 1942, launched 8 February 1943, and commissioned on 19 March 1943.

YMS-136 was reclassified as coastal minesweeper USS Egret (AMS-46) on 19 August 1947.

On 7 February 1955 she was designated MSCO-46.

Egret was struck from the Navy list on 1 November 1959 and transferred to the Brazilian Navy as Jutai on 15 August 1960. Awards:

- American Campaign Medal
- World War II Victory Medal
- Navy Occupation with Asia clasp
- Asiatic–Pacific Campaign Medal with 3 stars

American Area Codes (A) / Asiatic-Pacific Area Codes (P) / European African Middle Eastern Area Codes (E)

List of engagement stars for World War II:

21 Jul 44 – 15 Aug 44 P29 Capture and occupation of Guam

6 Sep 44 - 14 Oct 44 P30-2 Capture and occupation of southern Palau Islands

22 Sep 45 - 30 Oct 45 P207-7 Bungo-Suido (Honshu Area)***

4 Dec 45 - 12 Feb 46 P207-9 Kobe (Honshu Area) ***

Minesweeping Operations Pacific P-207 - P-207-28

(Only 1 star for participation in 1 or more of the following:)***

(information obtained from Navy and Marine Corps Award Manual 1953)
