= USC&GS Derickson =

History

United States
- Name: USC&GS Derickson
- Namesake: Commander Richard B. Derickson, USC&GS
- Builder: Ballard Marine Railway Company
- Laid down: 25 April 1943
- Launched: 6 November 1943
- Commissioned: 17 May 1944
- Out of service: 1948
- Stricken: 28 November 1948
- Fate: Sold, 1954, for $23,896.99 USD
- Notes: Ship International Radio Callsign:NCHW

General characteristics
- Class & type: PCS-1376-class patrol craft sweeper/survey ship
- Displacement: 245 tons(light) 338 tons(full)
- Length: 136 ft (41 m)
- Beam: 24 ft 6 in (7.47 m)
- Draft: 8 ft 7 in (2.62 m)
- Propulsion: 2 x 1,000 bhp (750 kW) General Motors 8-268A diesel engines
- Speed: 14.1 knots (26.1 km/h; 16.2 mph)
- Complement: 57 men
- Armament: 20 mm AA gun

USC&GS Derickson was a PCS-1376-class patrol craft sweeper/survey ship in service with the United States Coast and Geodetic Survey. Entering service in 1944, she was out of service by 1948, and sold by 1954.

She was laid down on 25 April 1943, as PCS-1458 by Ballard Marine Railway for the United States Navy, but never actually saw any military service. She was launched on 6 November 1943, and was loaned to the U.S. Coast and Geodetic Survey on 17 May 1944 and commissioned as USC&GS Derickson. Ten days later, she was reclassified as a survey ship by the U.S. Navy. She would serve in this capacity until 1948. Derickson was struck from the Naval Register on 23 November 1948, when she was permanently transferred to the Department of Commerce. In 1954, she was sold for US$23,896.99. Her current fate is unknown.

== Ship namesake ==
Commander Richard B. Derickson (1873-1942), USC&GS, rendered service in field assignments along the Atlantic and Pacific coasts of the United States and in the South Pacific Ocean, and had notable achievements as Assistant Chief of the Coast and Geodetic Survey's Hydrographic Division and Director of Coast Surveys in the Philippine Islands.
