= USS Detector (AMc-75) =

Minesweeper of the United States Navy

History

United States
- Name: Detector
- Laid down: 29 March 1941
- Launched: 29 May 1941
- In service: 18 September 1941
- Out of service: 13 February 1946
- Fate: Transferred to the Maritime Commission 8 April 1947 for disposal

General characteristics
- Class & type: Accentor-class minesweeper
- Displacement: 195 tons
- Length: 97 ft 1 in (29.59 m)
- Beam: 22 ft 0 in (6.71 m)
- Draft: 8.5 ft (2.6 m) (mean) (f.)
- Speed: 10.0 knots (19 km/h)
- Complement: 17
- Armament: 2 × .50 cal (12.7 mm) machine guns

USS Detector (AMc-75) was an Accentor-class minesweeper acquired by the U.S. Navy for the task of removing naval mines laid in the water to prevent ships from passing.

Detector was launched 29 May 1941 by the Gibbs Gas Engine Co., Jacksonville, Florida.

== World War II service ==
Detector was placed in service 18 September 1941; and served in the 1st Naval District and in the 5th Naval District during World War II. She was sunk in collision with the tanker Oswego 300 yards (270 m) east northeast of Finn's Ledge Buoy, Boston, Massachusetts, on 17 February 1942. Later raised, repaired, and returned to service.

== Post-war inactivation ==
She was placed out of service 13 February 1946 and transferred to the Maritime Commission 8 April 1947 for disposal.
