= USS Detector (AM-429) =

Minesweeper of the United States Navy

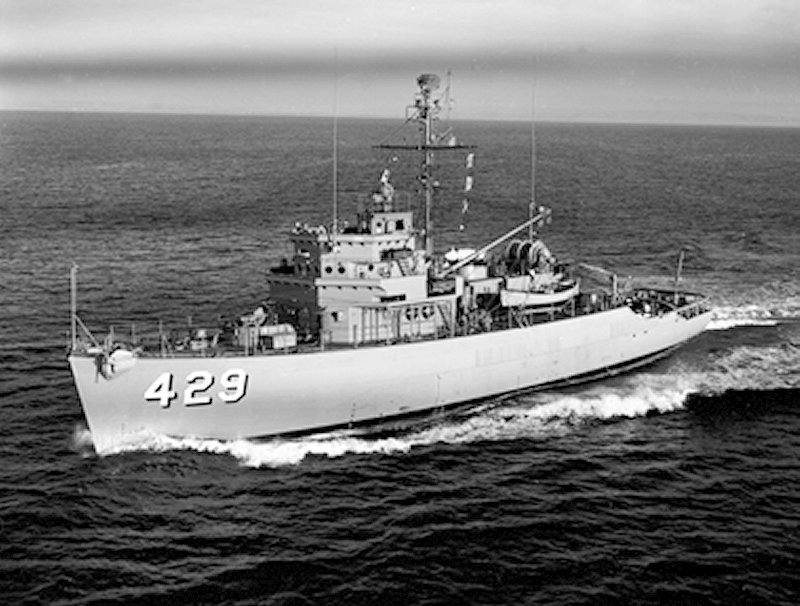

History

United States
- Builder: Astoria Marine Construction Company
- Laid down: 1 October 1951
- Launched: 5 December 1952
- Commissioned: 26 January 1954
- Decommissioned: 2 October 1982
- Stricken: 1 December 1983
- Home port: Charleston, South Carolina
- Fate: Scrapped, 1984

General characteristics
- Displacement: 620 tons
- Length: 172 ft (52 m)
- Beam: 36 ft (11 m)
- Draught: 10 ft (3.0 m)
- Speed: 16 knots
- Complement: 74
- Armament: one 40 mm mount

USS Detector (AM-429/MSO-429) was an Agile-class minesweeper built for the United States Navy.

The second ship to be named Detector by the Navy, AM-429 was launched 5 December 1952 by Astoria Marine Construction Company, Astoria, Oregon; sponsored by Mrs. W. Norblad; and commissioned 26 January 1954. She was reclassified MSO-429, 7 February 1955.

== East Coast operations ==
Detector sailed from San Diego, California, 18 October 1954 to join Mine Force, Atlantic Fleet, and arrived at Charleston, South Carolina, 8 November. Along with her operations in the local area and off Florida on mine exercises, she served tours of duty with the U.S. 6th Fleet in the Mediterranean in 1956, 1957, and 1959. She cruised to northern Europe between 12 May and 30 September 1958 and through 1962 took part in training and amphibious exercises.

== Final status ==
Detector was decommissioned on 1 October 1982 and struck from the Naval Vessel Register on 1 December 1983. She was scrapped in 1984.
