= List of United States Navy Landing Craft Infantry =

This is a list of Landing Craft Infantry (LCIs) built by the United States Navy. Twenty-eight LCIs would be transferred in 1945 to the Soviet Union (USSR) under Project Hula.

- USS LCI(L)-1
- USS LCI(L)-2
- USS LCI(L)-3
- USS LCI(L)-4
- USS LCI(L)-5
- USS LCI(L)-8
- USS LCI(L)-9
- USS LCI(L)-10
- USS LCI(L)-11
- USS LCI(L)-12
- USS LCI(L)-13
- USS LCI(L)-14
- USS LCI(L)-15
- USS LCI(L)-16
- USS LCI(L)-17
- USS LCI(L)-18
- USS LCI(L)-19
- USS LCI(L)-20
- USS LCI(L)-21
- USS LCI(L)-22
- USS LCI(L)-23
- USS LCI(L)-24
- USS LCI(L)-25
- USS LCI(L)-26
- USS LCI(L)-27
- USS LCI(L)-28
- USS LCI(L)-29
- USS LCI(L)-30
- USS LCI(L)-31
- USS LCI(L)-32
- USS LCI(L)-33
- USS LCI(L)-34
- USS LCI(L)-35
- USS LCI(L)-36
- USS LCI(L)-37
- USS LCI(L)-38
- USS LCI(L)-39
- USS LCI(L)-40
- USS LCI(L)-41
- USS LCI(L)-42
- USS LCI(L)-43
- USS LCI(L)-44
- USS LCI(L)-45
- USS LCI(L)-46
- USS LCI(L)-47
- USS LCI(L)-48
- LCI(L)-49 to LCI(L)-60 - cancelled 6 November 1942
- USS LCI(L)-61
- USS LCI(L)-62
- USS LCI(L)-63
- USS LCI(L)-64
- USS LCI(L)-65
- USS LCI(L)-66
- USS LCI(L)-67
- USS LCI(L)-68
- USS LCI(L)-69
- USS LCI(L)-70
- USS LCI(L)-71
- USS LCI(L)-72
- USS LCI(L)-73
- USS LCI(L)-74
- USS LCI(L)-75
- USS LCI(L)-76
- USS LCI(L)-77
- USS LCI(L)-78
- USS LCI(L)-79
- USS LCI(L)-80
- USS LCI(L)-81
- USS LCI(L)-82
- USS LCI(L)-83
- USS LCI(L)-84
- USS LCI(L)-85
- USS LCI(L)-86
- USS LCI(L)-87
- USS LCI(L)-88
- USS LCI(L)-89
- USS LCI(L)-90
- USS LCI(L)-91
- USS LCI(L)-92
- USS LCI(L)-93
- USS LCI(L)-94
- USS LCI(L)-95
- USS LCI(L)-96
- LCI(L)-137 to LCI(L)-160 cancelled 31 October 1942
- USS LCI(L)-188
- USS LCI(L)-189
- USS LCI(L)-190
- USS LCI(L)-191
- USS LCI(L)-192
- USS LCI(L)-193
- USS LCI(L)-194
- USS LCI(L)-195
- USS LCI(L)-196
- LCI(L)-197 to LCI(L)-208 cancelled 5 November 1942
- USS LCI(L)-209
- USS LCI(L)-210
- USS LCI(L)-211
- USS LCI(L)-212
- USS LCI(L)-213
- USS LCI(L)-214
- USS LCI(L)-215
- USS LCI(L)-216
- USS LCI(L)-217
- USS LCI(L)-218
- USS LCI(L)-219
- USS LCI(L)-220
- USS LCI(L)-221
- USS LCI(L)-222
- USS LCI(L)-223
- USS LCI(L)-224
- USS LCI(L)-225
- USS LCI(L)-226
- USS LCI(L)-227
- USS LCI(L)-228
- USS LCI(L)-229
- USS LCI(L)-230
- USS LCI(L)-231
- USS LCI(L)-232
- USS LCI(L)-233
- USS LCI(L)-234
- USS LCI(L)-235
- USS LCI(L)-236
- USS LCI(L)-237
- USS LCI(L)-238
- USS LCI(L)-243
- USS LCI(L)-269
- USS LCI(L)-274
- USS LCI(L)-275
- USS LCI(L)-317
- USS LCI(L)-319
- USS LCI(L)-320
- USS LCI(L)-321
- USS LCI(L)-322
- USS LCI(L)-323
- USS LCI(L)-324
- USS LCI(L)-325
- USS LCI(L)-326
- USS LCI(L)-327
- USS LCI(L)-328
- USS LCI(L)-329
- USS LCI(L)-330
- USS LCI(L)-331
- USS LCI(L)-332
- USS LCI(L)-333
- USS LCI(L)-334
- USS LCI(L)-335
- USS LCI(L)-336
- USS LCI(L)-337
- USS LCI(L)-338
- USS LCI(L)-339
- USS LCI(L)-340
- USS LCI(L)-341
- USS LCI(L)-342
- USS LCI(L)-343
- USS LCI(L)-344
- USS LCI(L)-345
- USS LCI(L)-346
- USS LCI(L)-347
- USS LCI(L)-348
- USS LCI(L)-349
- USS LCI(L)-350
- USS LCI(L)-351
- USS LCI(L)-352
- USS LCI(L)-353
- USS LCI(L)-354
- USS LCI(L)-355
- USS LCI(L)-356
- USS LCI(L)-357
- USS LCI(L)-358
- USS LCI(L)-359
- USS LCI(L)-360
- USS LCI(L)-361
- USS LCI(L)-362
- USS LCI(L)-363
- USS LCI(L)-364
- USS LCI(L)-365
- USS LCI(L)-366
- USS LCI(L)-367
- USS LCI(L)-368
- USS LCI(L)-369
- USS LCI(L)-370
- USS LCI(L)-371
- USS LCI(L)-372
- USS LCI(L)-373
- USS LCI(L)-392
- USS LCI(L)-393
- USS LCI(L)-394
- USS LCI(L)-395
- USS LCI(L)-396
- USS LCI(L)-397
- USS LCI(L)-398
- USS LCI(L)-399
- USS LCI(L)-400
- USS LCI(L)-401
- USS LCI(L)-402
- USS LCI(L)-403
- USS LCI(L)-404
- USS LCI(L)-405
- USS LCI(L)-406
- USS LCI(L)-407
- USS LCI(L)-408
- USS LCI(L)-409
- USS LCI(L)-410
- USS LCI(L)-411
- USS LCI(L)-412
- USS LCI(L)-413
- USS LCI(L)-414
- USS LCI(L)-415
- USS LCI(L)-416
- USS LCI(L)-417
- USS LCI(L)-418
- USS LCI(L)-419
- USS LCI(L)-420
- USS LCI(L)-421
- USS LCI(L)-422
- USS LCI(L)-423
- USS LCI(L)-424
- USS LCI(L)-425
- USS LCI(L)-426
- USS LCI(L)-427
- USS LCI(L)-428
- USS LCI(L)-429
- USS LCI(L)-430
- USS LCI(L)-431
- USS LCI(L)-432
- USS LCI(L)-433
- USS LCI(L)-434
- USS LCI(L)-435
- USS LCI(L)-436
- USS LCI(L)-437
- USS LCI(L)-438
- USS LCI(L)-439
- USS LCI(L)-440
- USS LCI(L)-441
- USS LCI(L)-442
- USS LCI(L)-443
- USS LCI(L)-444
- USS LCI(L)-445
- USS LCI(L)-446
- USS LCI(L)-447
- USS LCI(L)-448
- USS LCI(L)-449
- USS LCI(L)-450
- USS LCI(L)-451
- USS LCI(L)-452
- USS LCI(L)-453
- USS LCI(L)-454
- USS LCI(L)-455
- USS LCI(L)-456
- USS LCI(L)-457
- USS LCI(L)-458
- USS LCI(L)-459
- USS LCI(L)-460
- USS LCI(L)-461
- USS LCI(L)-462
- USS LCI(L)-463
- USS LCI(L)-464
- USS LCI(L)-465
- USS LCI(L)-466
- USS LCI(L)-467
- USS LCI(L)-468
- USS LCI(L)-469
- USS LCI(L)-470
- USS LCI(L)-471
- USS LCI(L)-472
- USS LCI(L)-473
- USS LCI(L)-474
- USS LCI(L)-475
- USS LCI(L)-476
- USS LCI(L)-477
- USS LCI(L)-478
- USS LCI(L)-479
- USS LCI(L)-480
- USS LCI(L)-481
- USS LCI(L)-482
- USS LCI(L)-483
- USS LCI(L)-484
- USS LCI(L)-485
- USS LCI(L)-486
- USS LCI(L)-487
- USS LCI(L)-488
- USS LCI(L)-489
- USS LCI(L)-490
- USS LCI(L)-491
- USS LCI(L)-492
- USS LCI(L)-493
- USS LCI(L)-494
- USS LCI(L)-495
- USS LCI(L)-496
- USS LCI(L)-497
- USS LCI(L)-498
- USS LCI(L)-499
- USS LCI(L)-500
- USS LCI(L)-501
- USS LCI(L)-502
- USS LCI(L)-503
- USS LCI(L)-504
- USS LCI(L)-505
- USS LCI(L)-506
- USS LCI(L)-507
- USS LCI(L)-508
- USS LCI(L)-509
- USS LCI(L)-510
- USS LCI(L)-511
- USS LCI(L)-512
- USS LCI(L)-513
- USS LCI(L)-514
- USS LCI(L)-515
- USS LCI(L)-516
- USS LCI(L)-517
- USS LCI(L)-518
- USS LCI(L)-519
- USS LCI(L)-520
- USS LCI(L)-521, to USSR 29 July 1945
- USS LCI(L)-522, to USSR 29 July 1945
- USS LCI(L)-523, to USSR 29 July 1945
- USS LCI(L)-524, to USSR 29 July 1945
- USS LCI(L)-525, to USSR 29 July 1945
- USS LCI(L)-526, to USSR 29 July 1945
- USS LCI(L)-527, to USSR 29 July 1945
- USS LCI(L)-528
- USS LCI(L)-529
- USS LCI(L)-530
- USS LCI(L)-531
- USS LCI(L)-532
- USS LCI(L)-533
- USS LCI(L)-534
- USS LCI(L)-535
- USS LCI(L)-536
- USS LCI(L)-537
- USS LCI(L)-538
- USS LCI(L)-539
- USS LCI(L)-540
- USS LCI(L)-541
- USS LCI(L)-542
- USS LCI(L)-543
- USS LCI(L)-544
- USS LCI(L)-545
- USS LCI(L)-546
- USS LCI(L)-547
- USS LCI(L)-548
- USS LCI(L)-549, Operation Crossroads nuclear test participant
- USS LCI(L)-550
- USS LCI(L)-551, to USSR 29 July 1945
- USS LCI(L)-552
- USS LCI(L)-553
- USS LCI(L)-554, to USSR 29 July 1945
- USS LCI(L)-555
- USS LCI(L)-556
- USS LCI(L)-557, to USSR 29 July 1945
- USS LCI(L)-558
- USS LCI(L)-559
- USS LCI(L)-560
- USS LCI(L)-561
- USS LCI(L)-562
- USS LCI(L)-563
- USS LCI(L)-564
- USS LCI(L)-565
- USS LCI(L)-566
- USS LCI(L)-567
- USS LCI(L)-568
- USS LCI(L)-569
- USS LCI(L)-570
- USS LCI(L)-571
- USS LCI(L)-572
- USS LCI(L)-573
- USS LCI(L)-574
- USS LCI(L)-575
- USS LCI(L)-576
- USS LCI(L)-577
- USS LCI(L)-578
- USS LCI(L)-579
- USS LCI(L)-580
- USS LCI(L)-581
- USS LCI(L)-582
- USS LCI(L)-583
- USS LCI(L)-584, to USSR 10 June 1945
- USS LCI(L)-585, to USSR 10 June 1945
- USS LCI(L)-586, to USSR 14 June 1945
- USS LCI(L)-587, to USSR 14 June 1945
- USS LCI(L)-588
- USS LCI(L)-589
- USS LCI(L)-590, to USSR 10 June 1945
- USS LCI(L)-591, to USSR 10 June 1945
- USS LCI(L)-592, to USSR 10 June 1945
- USS LCI(L)-593
- USS LCI(L)-594
- USS LCI(L)-595
- USS LCI(L)-596
- USS LCI(L)-597
- USS LCI(L)-598
- USS LCI(L)-599
- USS LCI(L)-600
- USS LCI(L)-601
- USS LCI(L)-602
- USS LCI(L)-603
- USS LCI(L)-604
- USS LCI(L)-605
- USS LCI(L)-606
- USS LCI(L)-607
- USS LCI(L)-608
- USS LCI(L)-609
- USS LCI(L)-610
- USS LCI(L)-611
- USS LCI(L)-612
- USS LCI(L)-613
- USS LCI(L)-614
- USS LCI(L)-615
- USS LCI(L)-616
- USS LCI(L)-617
- USS LCI(L)-618
- USS LCI(L)-619
- USS LCI(L)-620
- USS LCI(L)-621
- USS LCI(L)-622
- USS LCI(L)-623
- USS LCI(L)-624
- USS LCI(L)-625
- USS LCI(L)-626
- USS LCI(L)-627
- USS LCI(L)-628
- USS LCI(L)-629
- USS LCI(L)-630
- USS LCI(L)-631
- USS LCI(L)-632
- USS LCI(L)-633
- USS LCI(L)-634
- USS LCI(L)-635
- USS LCI(L)-636
- USS LCI(L)-637
- USS LCI(L)-638
- USS LCI(L)-639
- USS LCI(L)-640
- USS LCI(L)-641
- USS LCI(L)-642
- USS LCI(L)-643
- USS LCI(L)-644
- USS LCI(L)-645
- USS LCI(L)-646
- USS LCI(L)-647
- USS LCI(L)-648
- USS LCI(L)-649
- USS LCI(L)-650
- USS LCI(L)-651
- USS LCI(L)-652
- USS LCI(L)-653
- USS LCI(L)-654
- USS LCI(L)-655
- USS LCI(L)-656
- USS LCI(L)-657
- USS LCI(L)-658
- USS LCI(L)-659
- USS LCI(L)-660
- USS LCI(L)-661
- USS LCI(L)-662
- USS LCI(L)-663
- USS LCI(L)-664
- USS LCI(L)-665, to USSR 10 June 1945
- USS LCI(L)-666, to USSR 29 July 1945
- USS LCI(L)-667, to USSR 10 June 1945
- USS LCI(L)-668, to USSR 10 June 1945
- USS LCI(L)-669
- USS LCI(L)-670
- USS LCI(L)-671, to USSR 29 July 1945
- USS LCI(L)-672, to USSR 29 July 1945
- USS LCI(L)-673
- USS LCI(L)-674
- USS LCI(L)-675, to USSR 10 June 1945
- USS LCI(L)-676
- USS LCI(L)-677
- USS LCI(L)-678
- USS LCI(L)-679
- USS LCI(L)-680
- USS LCI(L)-681
- USS LCI(L)-682
- USS LCI(L)-683
- USS LCI(L)-684
- USS LCI(L)-685
- USS LCI(L)-686
- USS LCI(L)-687
- USS LCI(L)-688
- USS LCI(L)-689
- USS LCI(L)-690
- USS LCI(L)-691
- USS LCI(L)-692
- USS LCI(L)-693
- USS LCI(L)-694
- USS LCI(L)-695
- USS LCI(L)-696
- USS LCI(L)-697
- USS LCI(L)-698
- USS LCI(L)-699
- USS LCI(L)-700
- USS LCI(L)-701
- USS LCI(L)-702
- USS LCI(L)-703
- USS LCI(L)-704
- USS LCI(L)-705
- USS LCI(L)-706
- USS LCI(L)-707
- USS LCI(L)-708
- USS LCI(L)-709
- USS LCI(L)-710
- USS LCI(L)-711
- USS LCI(L)-712
- USS LCI(L)-713
- USS LCI(L)-714
- USS LCI(L)-715
- USS LCI(L)-716
- LCI(L)-717 to LCI(L)-724 cancelled 19 August 1944
- USS LCI(L)-725
- USS LCI(L)-726
- USS LCI(L)-727
- USS LCI(L)-728
- USS LCI(L)-729
- USS LCI(L)-730
- USS LCI(L)-731
- USS LCI(L)-732
- USS LCI(L)-733
- USS LCI(L)-734
- USS LCI(L)-735
- USS LCI(L)-736
- USS LCI(L)-737
- USS LCI(L)-738
- USS LCI(L)-739
- USS LCI(L)-740
- USS LCI(L)-741
- USS LCI(L)-742
- USS LCI(L)-743
- USS LCI(L)-744
- USS LCI(L)-745
- USS LCI(L)-746
- USS LCI(L)-747
- USS LCI(L)-748
- USS LCI(L)-749
- USS LCI(L)-750
- USS LCI(L)-751
- USS LCI(L)-752
- USS LCI(L)-753
- USS LCI(L)-754
- USS LCI(L)-755
- USS LCI(L)-756
- USS LCI(L)-757
- USS LCI(L)-758
- USS LCI(L)-759
- USS LCI(L)-760
- USS LCI(L)-761
- USS LCI(L)-762
- USS LCI(L)-763
- USS LCI(L)-764
- USS LCI(L)-765
- USS LCI(L)-766
- USS LCI(L)-767
- USS LCI(L)-768
- USS LCI(L)-769
- USS LCI(L)-770
- USS LCI(L)-771
- USS LCI(L)-772
- USS LCI(L)-773
- USS LCI(L)-774
- USS LCI(L)-775
- USS LCI(L)-776
- USS LCI(L)-777
- USS LCI(L)-778
- USS LCI(L)-779
- USS LCI(L)-780
- LCI(L)-781 cancelled 23 June 1944
- USS LCI(L)-782
- USS LCI(L)-783
- USS LCI(L)-784
- USS LCI(L)-785
- USS LCI(L)-786
- USS LCI(L)-787
- USS LCI(L)-788
- USS LCI(L)-789
- USS LCI(L)-790
- USS LCI(L)-791
- USS LCI(L)-792
- USS LCI(L)-793
- USS LCI(L)-794
- USS LCI(L)-795
- USS LCI(L)-796
- USS LCI(L)-797
- USS LCI(L)-798
- USS LCI(L)-799
- USS LCI(L)-800
- USS LCI(L)-801
- USS LCI(L)-802
- USS LCI(L)-803
- USS LCI(L)-804
- USS LCI(L)-805
- USS LCI(L)-806
- USS LCI(L)-807
- USS LCI(L)-808
- USS LCI(L)-809
- USS LCI(L)-810
- USS LCI(L)-811
- USS LCI(L)-812
- USS LCI(L)-813
- USS LCI(L)-814
- USS LCI(L)-815
- USS LCI(L)-816
- USS LCI(L)-817
- USS LCI(L)-818
- USS LCI(L)-819
- USS LCI(L)-820
- USS LCI(L)-821
- LCI(L)-822 to LCI(L)-837 cancelled 19 August 1944
- LCI(L)-838 to LCI(L)-844 cancelled 5 June 1944
- LCI(L)-845 to LCI(L)-859 cancelled 23 June 1944
- LCI(L)-860 to LCI(L)-865 cancelled 5 June 1944
- USS LCI(L)-866
- USS LCI(L)-867
- USS LCI(L)-868
- USS LCI(L)-869
- USS LCI(L)-870
- USS LCI(L)-871
- USS LCI(L)-872
- USS LCI(L)-873
- USS LCI(L)-874
- USS LCI(L)-875
- USS LCI(L)-876
- USS LCI(L)-877
- USS LCI(L)-878
- USS LCI(L)-879
- USS LCI(L)-880
- USS LCI(L)-881
- USS LCI(L)-882
- USS LCI(L)-883
- USS LCI(L)-884
- LCI(L)-885 to LCI(L)-901 cancelled 19 August 1944
- LCI(L)-902 to LCI(L)-928 cancelled 5 June 1944
- LCI(L)-929 to LCI(L)-942 cancelled 23 June 1944
- USS LCI(L)-943, to USSR 10 June 1945
- USS LCI(L)-944
- USS LCI(L)-945, to USSR 29 July 1945
- USS LCI(L)-946, to USSR 29 July 1945
- USS LCI(L)-947
- USS LCI(L)-948
- USS LCI(L)-949, to USSR 10 June 1945
- USS LCI(L)-950, to USSR 10 June 1945
- USS LCI(L)-951
- USS LCI(L)-952
- USS LCI(L)-953
- USS LCI(L)-954
- USS LCI(L)-955
- USS LCI(L)-956
- USS LCI(L)-957
- USS LCI(L)-958
- USS LCI(L)-959
- USS LCI(L)-960
- USS LCI(L)-961
- USS LCI(L)-962
- USS LCI(L)-963
- USS LCI(L)-964
- USS LCI(L)-965
- USS LCI(L)-966
- USS LCI(L)-967
- USS LCI(L)-968
- USS LCI(L)-969
- USS LCI(L)-970
- USS LCI(L)-971
- USS LCI(L)-972
- USS LCI(L)-973
- USS LCI(L)-974
- USS LCI(L)-975
- USS LCI(L)-976
- USS LCI(L)-977, Operation Crossroads participant
- USS LCI(L)-978
- USS LCI(L)-979
- USS LCI(L)-980
- USS LCI(L)-981
- USS LCI(L)-982
- USS LCI(L)-983
- USS LCI(L)-984
- USS LCI(L)-985
- USS LCI(L)-986
- USS LCI(L)-987
- USS LCI(L)-988
- USS LCI(L)-989
- USS LCI(L)-990
- USS LCI(L)-991
- USS LCI(L)-992
- USS LCI(L)-993
- USS LCI(L)-994
- USS LCI(L)-995
- USS LCI(L)-996
- USS LCI(L)-997
- USS LCI(L)-998
- USS LCI(L)-999
- USS LCI(L)-1000
- USS LCI(L)-1001
- USS LCI(L)-1002
- USS LCI(L)-1003
- USS LCI(L)-1004
- USS LCI(L)-1005
- USS LCI(L)-1006
- USS LCI(L)-1007
- USS LCI(L)-1008
- USS LCI(L)-1009
- USS LCI(L)-1010
- USS LCI(L)-1011
- USS LCI(L)-1012
- USS LCI(L)-1013
- USS LCI(L)-1014
- USS LCI(L)-1015
- USS LCI(L)-1016
- USS LCI(L)-1017
- USS LCI(L)-1018
- USS LCI(L)-1019
- USS LCI(L)-1020
- USS LCI(L)-1021
- USS LCI(L)-1022
- USS LCI(L)-1023
- USS LCI(L)-1024
- USS LCI(L)-1025
- USS LCI(L)-1026
- USS LCI(L)-1027
- USS LCI(L)-1028
- USS LCI(L)-1029
- USS LCI(L)-1030
- USS LCI(L)-1031
- USS LCI(L)-1032
- USS LCI(L)-1033
- LCI(L)-1034 to LCI(L)-1051 cancelled 19 June 1944
- USS LCI(L)-1052
- USS LCI(L)-1053
- USS LCI(L)-1054
- USS LCI(L)-1055
- USS LCI(L)-1056
- USS LCI(L)-1057
- USS LCI(L)-1058
- USS LCI(L)-1059
- USS LCI(L)-1060
- USS LCI(L)-1061
- USS LCI(L)-1062, Operation Crossroads participant
- USS LCI(L)-1063
- USS LCI(L)-1064
- USS LCI(L)-1065
- USS LCI(L)-1066
- USS LCI(L)-1067
- USS LCI(L)-1068
- USS LCI(L)-1069
- USS LCI(L)-1070
- USS LCI(L)-1071
- USS LCI(L)-1072
- USS LCI(L)-1073
- USS LCI(L)-1074
- USS LCI(L)-1075
- USS LCI(L)-1076
- USS LCI(L)-1077
- USS LCI(L)-1078
- USS LCI(L)-1079
- USS LCI(L)-1080
- USS LCI(L)-1081
- USS LCI(L)-1082
- USS LCI(L)-1083
- USS LCI(L)-1084
- USS LCI(L)-1085
- USS LCI(L)-1086
- USS LCI(L)-1087
- USS LCI(L)-1088
- USS LCI(L)-1089
- USS LCI(L)-1090
- USS LCI(L)-1091
- USS LCI(L)-1092
- USS LCI(L)-1093
- USS LCI(L)-1094
- USS LCI(L)-1095
- USS LCI(L)-1096
- USS LCI(L)-1097
- USS LCI(L)-1098
- LCI(L)-1099 to LCI-(L)-1139 cancelled 19 August 1944
