= USS Accentor =

Two ships of the United States Navy have been named Accentor, after the accentor, a bird most notably the hedge sparrow.

- USS Accentor (AMc-36), was a coastal minesweeper and the lead ship of the Accentor class.
- USS Accentor (LCIL-652), was a large infantry landing craft that was converted into an underwater mine locator.
