= William Trump =

United States Lifesaving Service Station-keeper

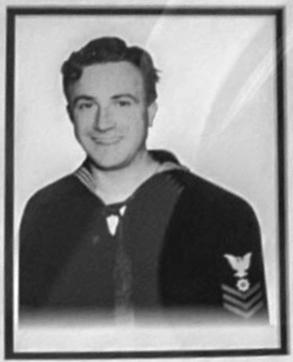
- Born: November 7, 1923; Bloomsburg, Pennsylvania
- Died: July 24, 2009 (aged 85); St. Petersburg, Florida
- Military career
- Branch: United States Coast Guard
- Service years: 1941–1965
- Rank: Chief Petty Officer
- Unit: USS LCI-90
- Battles: Normandy Landings
- Awards: Silver star

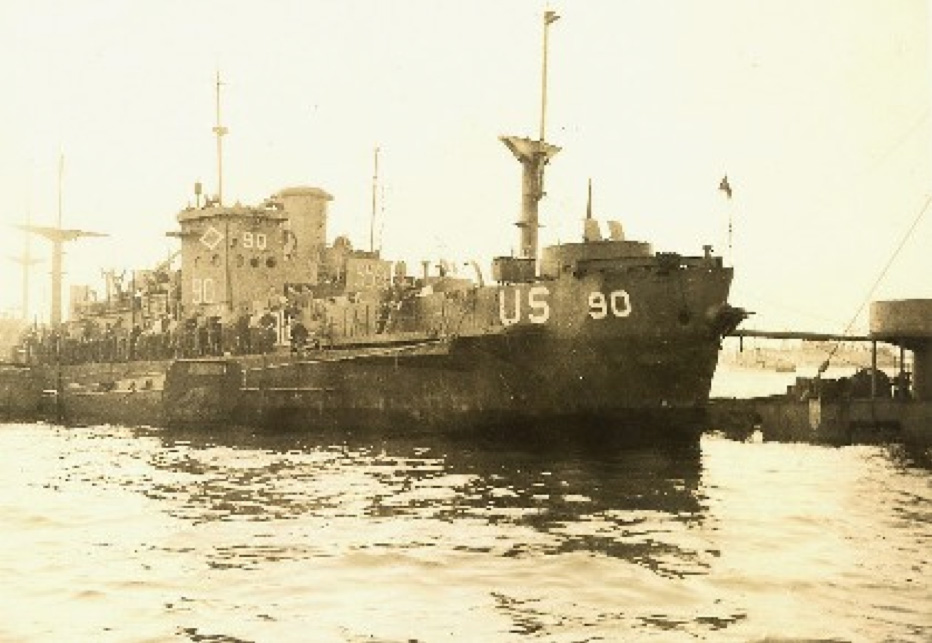
Trump was awarded a Silver Star when LCI 90 landed on Omaha Beach.

William Francis Trump (November 7, 1923 – July 24, 2009) served aboard a Landing Craft Infantry vessel during four amphibious assaults, during World War II. His vessel, the USS LCI-90, participated in the invasion of French North Africa, Sicily and Anzio in 1943, and in the Invasion of Normandy in 1944. It was during the Invasion of Normandy that Trump earned a Silver Star. He volunteered to venture onto the Omaha Beach and anchor a safety line for the 200 soldiers his vessel carried to follow ashore. Trump had to make his way past heavily mined beach fortifications, while under heavy enemy fire. His helmet was creased by a German bullet.

Trump lied about his age, and enlisted in the Coast Guard in 1941 at 17 years old. He retired as a chief petty officer, in 1965.

After retirement Trump joined the Merchant Marine, serving for fifteen years aboard vessels of Belcher Oil Company.

Only eleven other members of the Coast Guard have been awarded the Silver Star.

== USCGC William Trump ==
In 2010 when the Coast Guard decided that all the new Sentinel-class cutters would be named after Coast Guard enlisted personnel who had been recognized for their heroism; Trump was one of those to be honored. The eleventh cutter in the class was named the USCGC William Trump. She is homeported in Key West, Florida. Trump's eight children attended a dedication ceremony at the Bollinger Shipyards in Louisiana in March 2012. Trump's eldest grandson, Jeremy Trump, became a Navy SEAL, saying that it was only after he enlisted that he and his grandfather discussed his record.

=== Silver Star citation ===
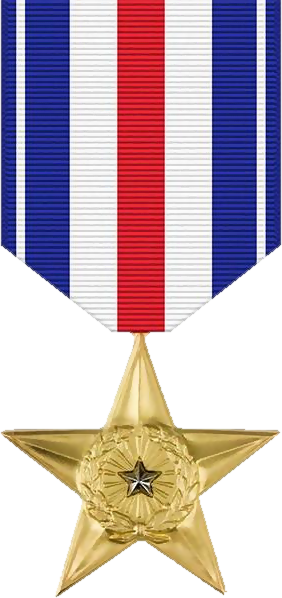

General Orders: Commander 12th Fleet: Serial 10336 (October 26, 1944)

The President of the United States of America takes pleasure in presenting the Silver Star to Motor Machinist's Mate First Class William F. Trump, United States Coast Guard (Reserve), for gallantry and intrepidity in action in the assault phase of an LCI (L) which landed troops in the face of severe enemy fire and despite a profusion of beach obstacles on the coast of France on 6 June 1944. Having volunteered for the assignment Motor Machinist's Mate First Class Trump waded between the heavily mined beach obstacles and dragged an anchor and anchor-line to shallow water, thereby providing a safety line for troops to follow. His determination to carry out his duty in disregard to the many dangers close at hand was in keeping with the highest traditions of the United States Coast Guard service.
