= USS LCI-90 =

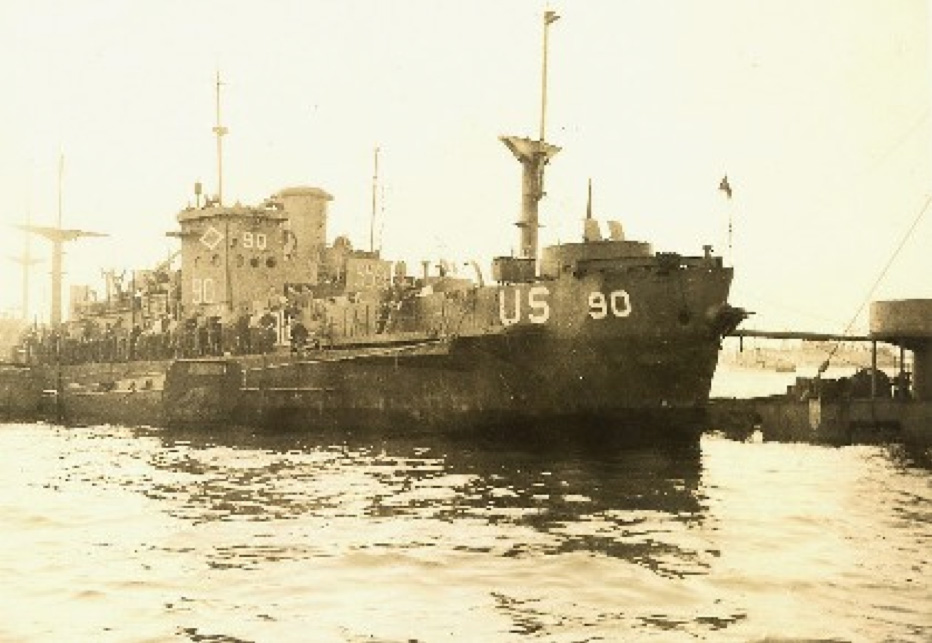
- USS LCI(L)-90

History

United States
- Name: USS LCI(L)-90; USS LCI(G)-90
- Builder: Consolidated Steel Shipyard, Orange, Texas
- Laid down: October 1942
- Launched: December 1942
- Commissioned: 6 February 1943
- Decommissioned: 8 April 1946
- Stricken: Unknown
- Fate: Sold for scrap, 13 November 1947

General characteristics
- Class & type: Landing Craft Infantry
- Displacement: 216 t.(light), 234 t.(landing), 389 t.(loaded)
- Length: 158 ft 5.5 in (48.298 m)
- Beam: 23 ft 3 in (7.09 m)
- Draft: Light, 3 ft 1.5 in (0.953 m) mean; Landing, 2 ft 8 in (0.81 m) fwd, 4 ft 10 in (1.47 m) aft; Loaded, 5 ft 4 in (1.63 m) fwd, 5 ft 11 in (1.80 m) aft
- Propulsion: 2 sets of 4 General Motors diesels, 4 per shaft, BHP 1,600, twin variable pitch propellers
- Speed: 16 knots (30 km/h) (max.); 14 knots (26 km/h) maximum continuous
- Endurance: 4,000 miles at 12 knots, loaded, 500 miles at 15 knots; and 110 tons of fuel
- Capacity: 75 tons cargo
- Troops: 6 Officers, 182 Enlisted
- Complement: 3 officers, 21 enlisted
- Armament: 4 × 20 mm AA guns; 2 × .50" machine guns
- Armor: 2" plastic splinter protection on gun turrets, conning tower, and pilot house

USS LCI(L)-90 was an amphibious assault ship manned by a United States Coast Guard crew. She was commissioned in 1943 and was used to land troops in the landings on French North Africa, Sicily and Anzio in 1943, and at Omaha Beach during the Invasion of Normandy in 1944. She participated in the invasion of Okinawa, where she was attacked by a Japanese kamikaze fighter. Her two commanding officers were both Lieutenant junior grade, of the Coast Guard. William Trump a seaman who volunteered to go ashore before the troops, at Omaha Beach, and lay out a cable through a safe path to shore, was awarded a Silver Star. According to a soldier who landed from LCI-90 during the Invasion of Normandy, the vessel's doors were damaged by enemy fire. During the Invasion of Okinawa LCI-90 was damaged by a kamikaze, after she had landed her soldiers, and one seaman was killed.

== See also ==
- Landing Craft Infantry
- List of United States Navy Landing Craft Infantry (LCI)
- List of United States Navy amphibious warfare ships
