= USCGC Charles Sexton =

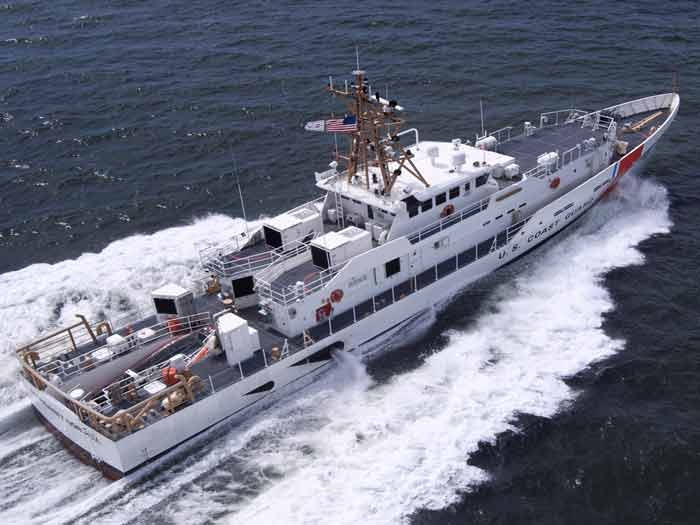
- Charles Sexton, underway.

History

United States
- Name: Charles Sexton
- Namesake: Charles W. Sexton
- Operator: United States Coast Guard
- Builder: Bollinger Shipyards, Lockport, Louisiana
- Launched: December 10, 2013
- Acquired: December 10, 2013
- Commissioned: March 8, 2014
- Home port: Key West, Florida
- Identification: MMSI number: 338926408; Callsign: NDRA; Hull number: WPC-1108
- Motto: Sacrifice through service
- Status: in active service
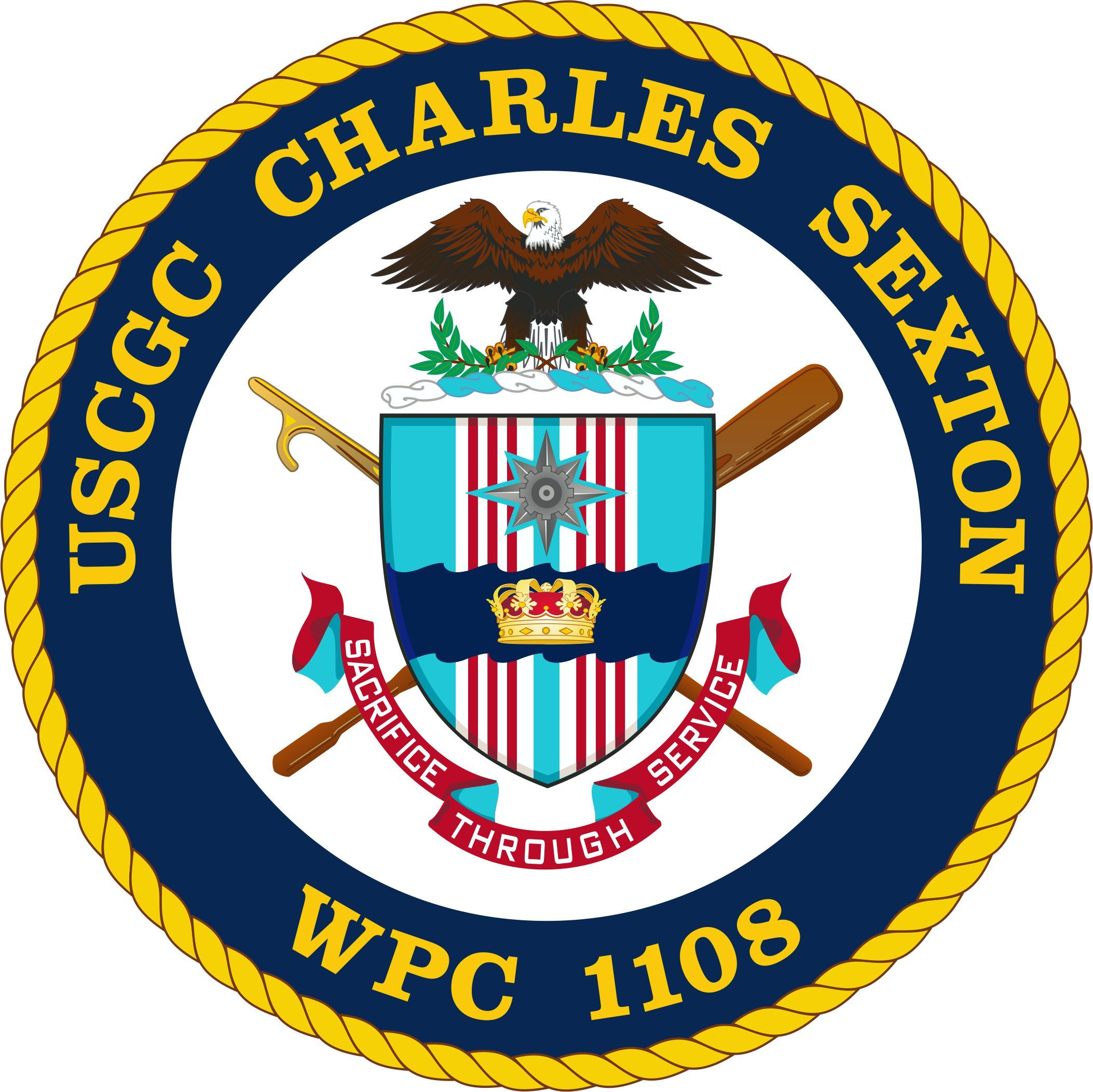
- Badge

General characteristics
- Class & type: Sentinel-class cutter
- Displacement: 353 long tons (359 t)
- Length: 46.8 m (154 ft)
- Beam: 8.11 m (26.6 ft)
- Depth: 2.9 m (9.5 ft)
- Propulsion: 2 × 4,300 kW (5,800 shp); 1 × 75 kW (101 shp) bow thruster
- Speed: 28 knots (52 km/h; 32 mph)
- Range: 2,500 nautical miles (4,600 km; 2,900 mi)
- Endurance: 5 days
- Boats & landing craft carried: 1 × Short Range Prosecutor RHIB
- Complement: 2 officers, 20 crew
- Sensors & processing systems: L-3 C4ISR suite
- Armament: 1 × Mk 38 Mod 2 25 mm automatic gun; 4 × crew-served Browning M2 machine guns

USCGC Charles Sexton (WPC-1108) is the eighth Sentinel-class cutter, and the second to be based in Key West, Florida. She was delivered to the United States Coast Guard for a final evaluation and shakedown on December 10, 2013, and the vessel was commissioned on March 8, 2014.

== Design ==
The Sentinel-class cutters were designed to replace the shorter 110-foot (34 m) Island-class patrol boats. Charles Sexton is armed with a remote-control 25 mm (0.98 in) Bushmaster autocannon and four crew-served M2HB .50-caliber machine guns. She has a bow thruster for maneuvering in crowded anchorages and channels. She also has small underwater fins for coping with the rolling and pitching caused by large waves. She is equipped with a stern launching ramp, like the Marine Protector-class and the eight failed expanded Island-class cutters. She has a complement of twenty-two crew members. Like the Marine Protector class, and the cancelled extended Island-class cutters, the Sentinel-class cutters deploy the Short Range Prosecutor rigid-hulled inflatable (SRP or RHIB) in rescues and interceptions. According to Marine Log, modifications to the Coast Guard vessels from the Stan 4708 design include an increase in speed from 23 to 28 knots (43 to 52 km/h; 26 to 32 mph), fixed-pitch rather than variable-pitch propellers, stern launch capability, and watertight bulkheads.

Charles Sexton has an overall length of 153 feet 6 inches (46.79 m), a beam of 25 feet (7.6 m), and a displacement of 325 long tons (330 t; 364 short tons). Her draft is 9 feet 6 inches (2.90 m) and she has a maximum speed of over 28 knots (52 km/h; 32 mph). The Sentinel-class cutters have endurances of five days and a range of 2,950 nautical miles (3,390 mi; 5,460 km).

== Operational career ==
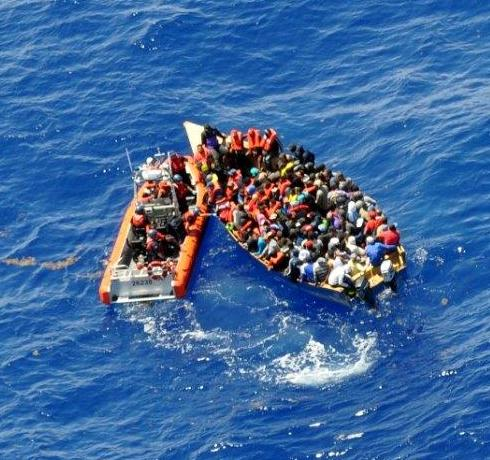
Crew of the USCGC Charles Sexton intercepts undocumented migrants.

On May 21, 2015, the Charles Sexton intercepted 117 undocumented migrants from the Dominican Republic from a dangerously overloaded boat. 93 men and 24 women were repatriated home.

Charles Sexton joined in the search for the freighter El Faro, which disappeared during an October 2015 Hurricane Joaquin.

The cutter intercepted 39 Cuban refugees, for return to Cuba, in November 2015. Three separate refugee craft were intercepted.

In November, 2018, the Charles Sexton, and her sister ship, the William Trump, interdicted 36 Cuban migrants, and repatriated 35 of them to Cabañas, Cuba. One migrant seemed to suffer from respiratory arrest. The onboard EMT treated the victim, who was then sent to a US port for further medical treatment.

== Namesake ==
The vessel is named after Charles W. Sexton, who served as a Machinery Technician in the United States Coast Guard. Sexton lost his life while rescuing fishermen off the mouth of the Columbia River.
