= Charles W. Sexton =

US Coast Guard petty officer (1953–1991)

Charles Sexton
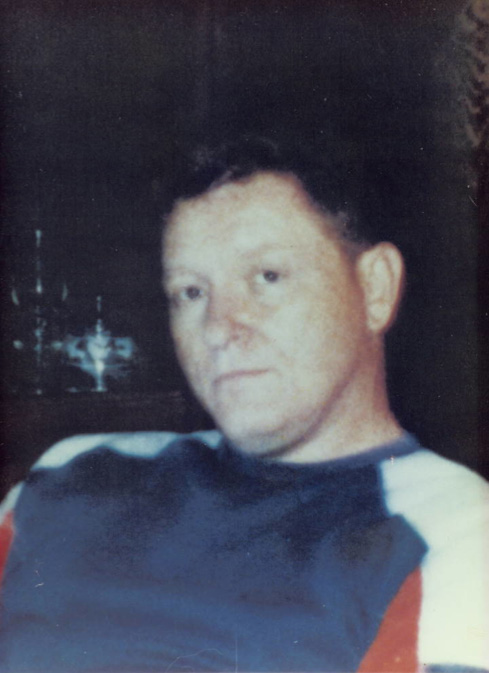
- Petty Officer Charles Sexton lost his life helping to save fishermen off the Oregon coast.
- Born: Charles William Sexton; March 7, 1953; Fort Bragg, North Carolina, U.S.
- Died: January 11, 1991 (aged 37)
- Military career
- Branch: United States Coast Guard
- Service years: 1971-1991
- Rank: Petty Officer First Class
- Awards: Coast Guard Medal

Charles W. Sexton (March 7, 1953 – January 11, 1991) was a petty officer first class in the United States Coast Guard, who was awarded posthumously awarded the Coast Guard Medal for "extraordinary heroism."

== Action cited ==
Sexton died during the rescue of fishermen stranded off the treacherous Columbia River bar.

A Coast Guard Motor Lifeboat Crew had proceeded to the fishing trawler Sea King in motor lifeboat 44381, because the trawler had lost power off the Columbia bar, and was taking on water. As the unit's Emergency Medical Technician, Sexton was tending to a wounded fisherman's injuries after bringing over dewatering pumps when the trawler unexpectedly turned over. Two of the trawler's crew and a Coast Guardsman were thrown into the Ocean and were eventually rescued, but Sexton and two other crew members became trapped in the vessel's pilot house and drowned.

== Coast Guard Medal citation ==
His award citation stated:

Petty Officer SEXTON is cited for extraordinary heroism on 11 January 1991 while serving as emergency medical technician aboard Coast Guard Motor Lifeboat CG-44381. The boat crew was responding to a distress call from F/V SEA KING, a 75-foot stern trawler with four persons on board, which was taking on water and in danger of sinking, four nautical miles northwest of the Columbia River Bar, with her decks awash and after compartment and engine room steadily filling up with water. From the relative safety the motor lifeboat, Petty Officer SEXTON unselfishly volunteered to go aboard the foundering fishing vessel to treat the injuries of a SEA KING crew member who had fallen to the deck boat during a failed helicopter hoist. He skillfully diagnosed the victim’s injuries, informed the flight surgeon of the extent of the injuries and provided first aid treatment. Once the victim was stabilized, Petty Officer SEXTON turned his attention to assisting with the dewatering of the vessel. The SEA KING required several dewatering pumps to remove the initial quantity of sea water from the engine room. Then, hourly dewatering of the vessel was necessary to maintain proper trim aboard the vessel. After more than 6 hours of this exhausting routine, with the worst of the treacherous bar crossing behind them, the SEA KING suddenly, without warning, rolled over, throwing victims into the churning seas and trapping Petty Officer SEXTON in the enclosed pilot house. He went down with vessel, sacrificing his life while attempting to save the lives of the SEA KING’s crew members. Petty Officer SEXTON demonstrated remarkable initiative, exceptional fortitude, and daring in spite of imminent danger in this rescue. His courage and devotion to duty are most heartily commended and are in keeping with the highest traditions of the United States Coast Guard.

== Sexton Hall ==
The first barracks new Coast Guard recruits inhabit upon their arrival at the Coast Guard Training Center in Cape May, New Jersey, is named "Sexton Hall", in his honor.

Recruits stay there during their orientation, prior to their assignment to a training unit.

Upon arriving to recruit basic training in Cape May, New Jersey, recruits spend their first three nights in Sexton Hall for forming, and before being put into a company. Named after Charles W. Sexton, there are tributes to him within the barracks. Sexton Hall is also the residence of recruits discharged before completion of recruit training awaiting orders home (whether for medical or disciplinary reasons).

== Cape Disappointment ==
The Coast Guard's National Motor Lifeboat School where Sexton was stationed at the time of his death, named the maintenance building in his honor. A bronze relief plaque is displayed at the building entrance to remind staff and students of his ultimate sacrifice.

== USCGC Charles Sexton ==
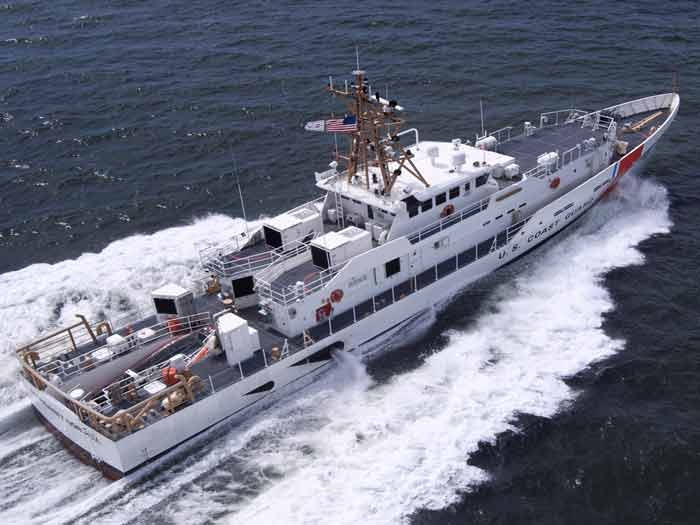
USCGC Charles Sexton

In 2010, when the Coast Guard decided that all the new Sentinel class cutters would be named after Coast Guard personnel who had been recognized for their heroism, Sexton was one of those to be honored. The 8th cutter in the class was named the USCGC Charles Sexton and is based in Key West, Florida.

A 154' USCG Sentinel-Class Fast Response Cutter that bears his name was commissioned in Key West, FL on March 8, 2014.

== See also ==
- USCGC Charles Sexton (WPC-1108)

== Sources ==
- Who are some of the heroes of the Coast Guard?", USCG
