= USS LCI(L)-1092 =

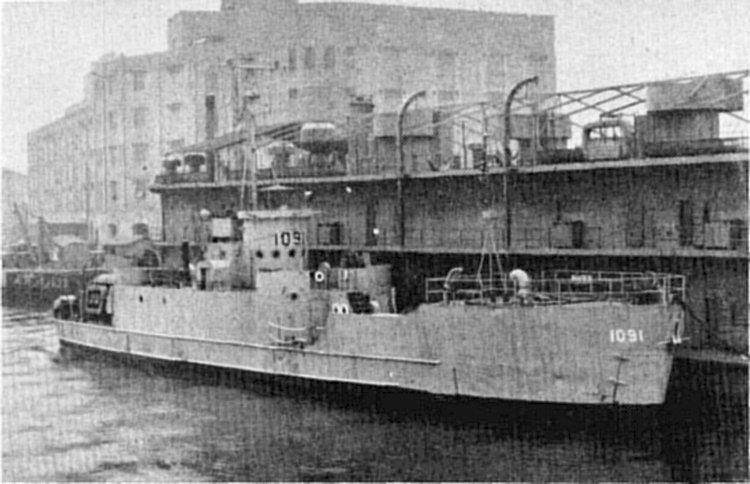

History

United States
- Name: LCI(L)-1092
- Builder: Defoe Shipbuilding Company, Bay City, Michigan
- Launched: 19 September 1944
- Commissioned: 21 September 1944
- Reclassified: LSI(L)-1091, 28 February 1949
- Decommissioned: 1955
- Honors and awards: as LCI(L)-1092: 2 battle stars, World War II
- Fate: Unknown

General characteristics
- Class & type: LCI(L)-351-class large landing craft
- Displacement: 236 t.(light), 264 t.(landing), 419 t.(loaded)
- Length: 158 ft 5.5 in (48.298 m)
- Beam: 23 ft 3 in (7.09 m)
- Draft: Light, 3 ft 1.5 in (0.953 m) mean; Landing, 2 ft 8 in (0.81 m) fwd, 4 ft 10 in (1.47 m) aft; Loaded, 5 ft 4 in (1.63 m) fwd, 5 ft 11 in (1.80 m) aft
- Propulsion: 2 sets of 4 General Motors diesels, 4 per shaft, BHP 1,600, twin variable pitch propellers
- Speed: 16 knots (30 km/h) (max.); 14 knots (26 km/h) maximum continuous
- Endurance: 4,000 miles at 12 knots, loaded, 500 miles at 15 knots; and 110 tons of fuel
- Capacity: 75 tons cargo
- Troops: 6 Officers, 182 Enlisted
- Complement: 4 officers, 24 enlisted
- Armament: 5 × 20 mm AA guns; 2 × .50" machine guns
- Armor: 2" plastic splinter protection on gun turrets, conning tower, and pilot house

USS LCI(L)-1092 was an LCI(L)-351-class large landing craft built for the United States Navy in World War II. Like most ships of her class, she was not named and known only by her designation.

== Operational history ==
LCI(L)-1092 was laid down at Defoe Shipbuilding Co. in Bay City, Michigan and commissioned 23 September 1944, two days after the commissioning of the 1091.

She was assigned to the Pacific Theatre and participated in the assault and occupation of Okinawa Gunto from 28 April to 30 June 1945. After a short hiatus, it was on occupation duty from 2 September to 16 December 1945. The LCI(L)-1092 received two battle stars for World War II action.

== Bibliography ==
- Silverstone, Paul H. (2008). The Navy of World War II, 1922-1947. The U.S. Navy Warship Series. New York: Routledge. ISBN 978-0-415-97898-9.
