= USS LCI(L)-189 =

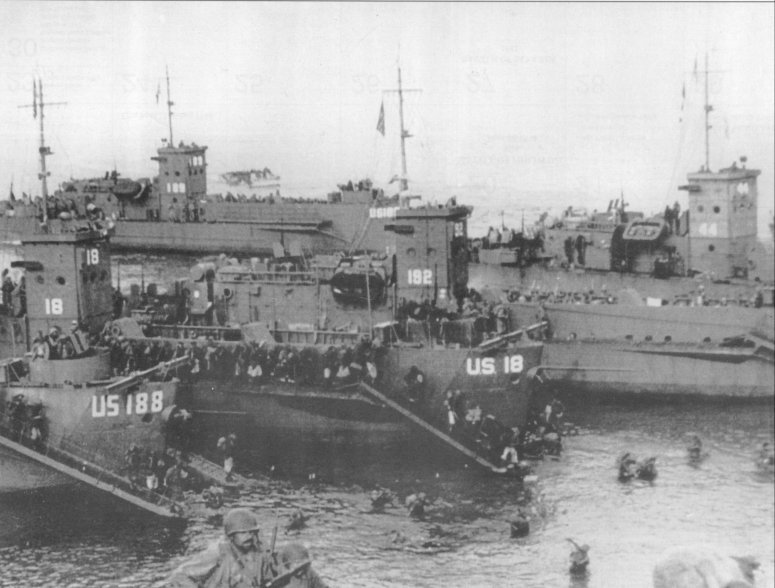
- USS LCI(L)-189 (top) landing at Elba 17 June 1944

History

United States
- Name: USS LCI(L)-189
- Builder: Federal Shipbuilding and Drydock Company; Kearny, New Jersey
- Laid down: 1942
- Launched: January 1943
- Commissioned: 28 January 1943
- Stricken: 1946

General characteristics
- Class & type: Landing Craft Infantry
- Displacement: 216 t.(light), 234 t.(landing), 389 t.(loaded)
- Length: 158 ft 5.5 in (48.298 m)
- Beam: 23 ft 3 in (7.09 m)
- Draft: Light, 3 ft 1.5 in (0.953 m) mean; Landing, 2 ft 8 in (0.81 m) fwd, 4 ft 10 in (1.47 m) aft; Loaded, 5 ft 4 in (1.63 m) fwd, 5 ft 11 in (1.80 m) aft
- Propulsion: 2 sets of 4 General Motors diesels, 4 per shaft, BHP 1,600, twin variable pitch propellers
- Speed: 16 knots (30 km/h) (max.); 14 knots (26 km/h) maximum continuous
- Endurance: 4,000 miles at 12 knots, loaded, 500 miles at 15 knots; and 110 tons of fuel
- Capacity: 75 tons cargo
- Troops: 6 Officers, 182 Enlisted
- Complement: 3 officers, 21 enlisted
- Armament: 4 × 20 mm AA guns; 2 × .50" machine guns
- Armor: 2" plastic splinter protection on gun turrets, conning tower, and pilot house

USS LCI(L)-189 was an amphibious assault ship commissioned in 1943 by the United States Navy and assigned to the Mediterranean theater during World War II. As part of Operation Husky, LCI(L)-189 participated in the allied landings in Sicily from 9–15 July 1943. From 9–21 September 1943 LCI(L)-189 took part in the Salerno landings during Operation Avalanche.

LCI(L)-189 saw action during Operation Shingle as part of the Anzio and Nettuno advanced landings on 22 January 1944 and other west coast of Italy operations during February – March, 1944. She took part in the Elba and Pianosa landings on 17 June 1944 before being assigned to Operation Dragoon, the invasion of southern France, from 15 August – 16 September 1944.

LCI(L)-189 was transferred to the Maritime Commission for disposal on 24 November 1947.

See Also:

- Landing Craft Infantry
- List of United States Navy Landing Craft Infantry (LCI)
- List of United States Navy amphibious warfare ships

== Awards, Citations and Campaign Ribbons ==
Four Battle Stars, World War II
American Campaign Medal
European–African–Middle Eastern Campaign Medal
World War II Victory Medal
