= USCGC William Trump =

US Coast Guard Sentinel-class cutter

USCGC William Trump (WPC-1111)
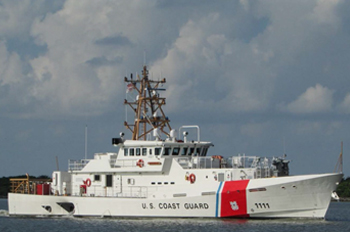
- William Trump, at its home port of Key West, Florida

History

United States
- Namesake: William Trump
- Builder: Bollinger Shipyards, Lockport, Louisiana
- Launched: November 25, 2014
- Acquired: November 25, 2014
- Commissioned: January 24, 2015
- Home port: Key West, Florida
- Identification: MMSI number: 338926411; Callsign: NECW; Hull number: WPC-1111
- Motto: Anchored in service
- Status: in active service
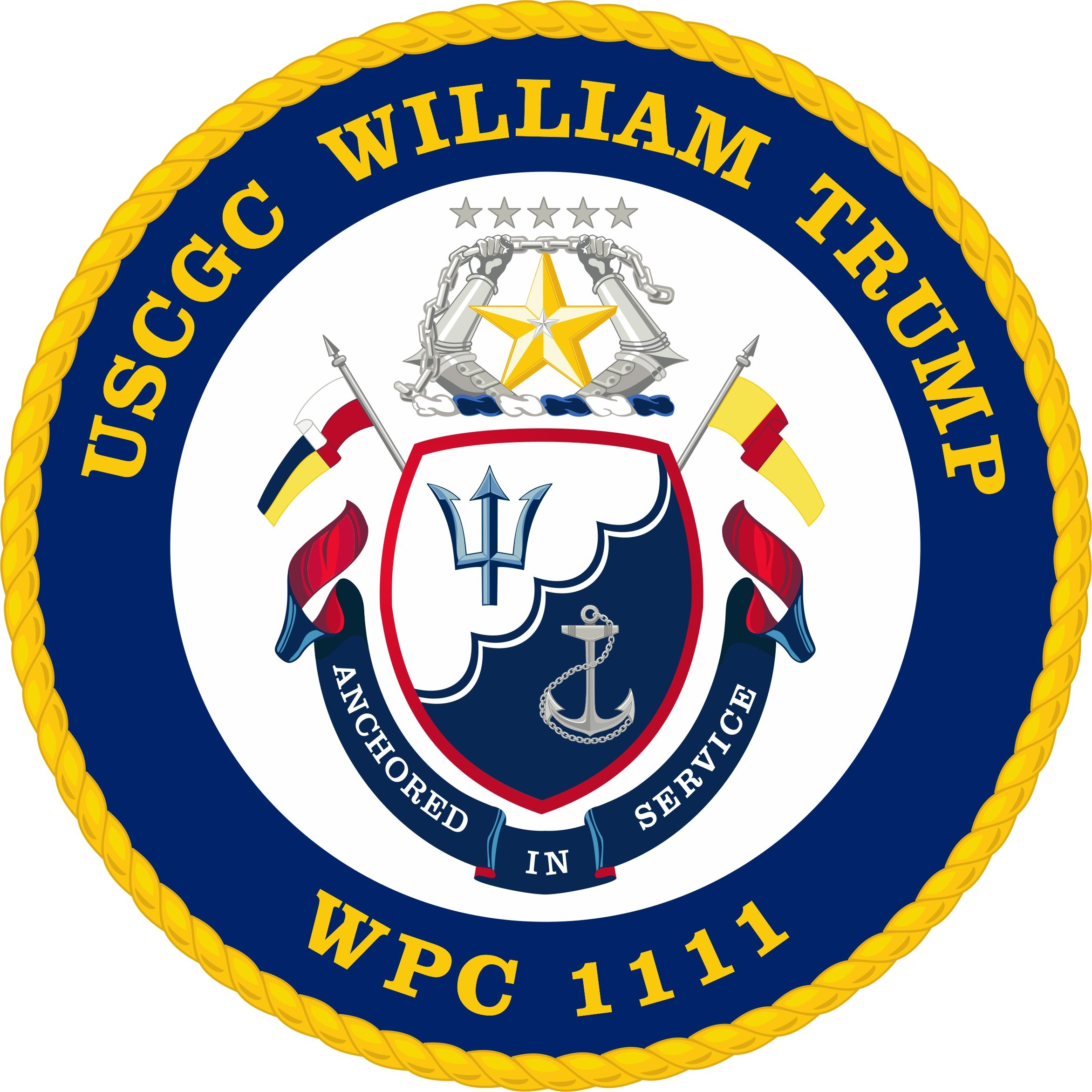
- Badge

General characteristics
- Class & type: Sentinel-class cutter
- Displacement: 353 long tons (359 t)
- Length: 46.8 m (154 ft)
- Beam: 8.11 m (26.6 ft)
- Depth: 2.9 m (9.5 ft)
- Propulsion: 2 × 4,300 kW (5,800 shp); 1 × 75 kW (101 shp) bow thruster
- Speed: 28 knots (52 km/h; 32 mph)
- Endurance: 5 days, 2,500 nmi (4,600 km; 2,900 mi); Designed to be on patrol 2,500 hours per year
- Boats & landing craft carried: 1 × Short Range Prosecutor RHIB
- Complement: 4 officers, 20 crew
- Sensors & processing systems: L-3 C4ISR suite
- Armament: 1 × Mk 38 Mod 2 25 mm automatic gun; 4 × Browning M2 .50 cal machine guns; Various small arms

USCGC William Trump (WPC-1111) is a Sentinel-class cutter of the United States Coast Guard. When she was delivered to the Coast Guard, on November 25, 2014, she was the eleventh vessel of her class, and the fifth vessel based in the Coast Guard's station in Key West, Florida.

Like her sister ships she has the endurance to take her crew on five day missions of up to 2,500 nautical miles (4,600 km). She has modern electronics, integrating her with the rest of the Coast Guard and is designed for search and rescue, apprehending smuggling vessels, intercepting international refugees, and other constabulary duties. She carries a high-speed jet-boat, that is deployed and retrieved via her stern launching ramp. She is armed by a remotely controlled 25 mm autocannon, and four crew served Browning fifty caliber machine guns. Her two diesel engines can propel her at 28 knots (52 km/h; 32 mph).

== Operational history ==
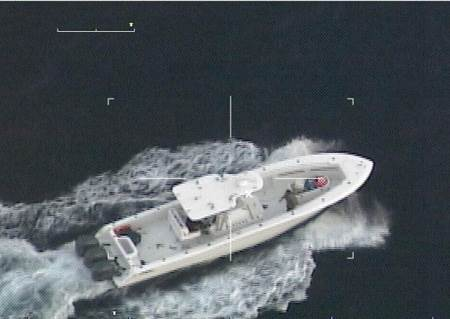
The USCG pursued this 35-foot (11 m) vessel, stolen from Fort Myers Florida, in December 2015, for over 300 nautical miles (560 km)

On December 24, 2015, William Trump, with other Coast Guard elements, pursued an expensive pleasure-craft stolen from Fort Myers, Florida. William Trump's chase of the vessel spanned 20 hours, and over 300 nautical miles (560 km), before the three-man crew gave up and surrendered. The stolen craft was a 36-foot (11 m) "go-fast", worth approximately $350,000, was powered by three 300 brake horsepower (220 kW) outboard motors, and was capable of traveling at 75 miles per hour (121 km/h). The three suspects, David Llanes Vasquez, Farfan Ramirez-Vidal and Sauri Raul De La Vega, were turned over to the Lee County Sheriff Department, after the stolen vessel had been towed home.

Initially the Sheriff's department had tried to apprehend the gö-fast, which responded by ramming the law enforcement vessel. The Sheriff's department handed the chase over to the Coast Guard when the vessel left their jurisdiction.

On May 5, 2016, the William Trump was mobilized when a report was received that a fishing vessel was firing upon a pleasure-craft 20 miles from one of the Florida Keys. Both vessel were boarded and brought back to port, for an investigation.

In November, 2018, the William Trump, and her sister ship, the Charles Sexton, interdicted 36 Cuban migrants from illegally entering the US, and repatriated 35 of them to Cabañas, Cuba. One migrant seemed to suffer a heart attack and was sent to a US port for medical treatment.

== Namesake ==
Like all the vessels in her class William Trump is named after an individual from the Coast Guard's past who has been recognized as a hero. Her namesake, William Trump, distinguished himself for his heroism helping soldiers land on Omaha Beach, during the Invasion of Normandy, actions that won him a Silver Star.
