= USS Mallard (AMCU-30) =

Minesweeper of the United States Navy

History

United States
- Name: USS Mallard
- Builder: Consolidated Steel Corporation, Orange, Texas
- Laid down: 25 February 1944
- Launched: 20 March 1944
- Commissioned: 16 May 1944, as USS LCI(L)-963
- Decommissioned: 1946
- Recommissioned: June 1952, as USS Mallard (AMCU-30)
- Decommissioned: July 1954
- Reclassified: LSIL-962, 28 February 1949; AMCU-30, 7 March 1952; MHC-30, 1 February 1955
- Stricken: 1 January 1960
- Identification: IMO number: 5000653
- Honors and awards: 4 battle stars (World War II)
- Fate: Sold, 30 June 1960

General characteristics
- Class & type: LCI(L)-351-class large landing craft
- Displacement: 246 long tons (250 t) light; 264 long tons (268 t) landing; 419 long tons (426 t) loaded
- Length: 158 ft 6 in (48.31 m)
- Beam: 23 ft 3 in (7.09 m)
- Draft: 5 ft 8 in (1.73 m)
- Propulsion: 8 × GM diesel engines (4 per shaft), 1,600 bhp (1,193 kW); 2 × variable pitch propellers
- Speed: 16 knots (30 km/h; 18 mph) maximum; 14 knots (26 km/h; 16 mph) maximum continuous
- Troops: 6 officers, 182 enlisted
- Complement: 4 officers, 24 enlisted
- Armament: 5 × single 20 mm AA guns (2 forward, 1 amidships, 2 aft)

USS Mallard (AMCU-30) was a LCI(L)-351-class large landing craft of the United States Navy, later converted to a AMCU-7-class coastal minesweeper.

The ship was laid down on 25 February 1944 by the Consolidated Steel Corporation, Orange, Texas, launched on 20 March 1944, and commissioned on 16 May 1944 as USS LCI(L)-963.

== World War II Pacific Theatre operations ==
After shakedown in the Gulf of Mexico, the new large infantry landing craft headed for the Pacific via the Panama Canal. Following amphibious training, LCI(L)-963 reached the war zone in time to help return General Douglas MacArthur to the Philippines with the landings on Leyte on 20 October 1944. She next participated in the Ormoc Bay landings on 7 December, and the invasion of Mindoro a week later. On the last day of January 1945, she lifted units of the 11th Airborne Division to the Batangas Province, Luzon. There the objective was Nasugbu, terminus of a road network radiating from Manila. In February, she assisted in the liberation of Palawan, whence she proceeded back across the Sulu Sea to fight in the Visayans.

LCI(L)-963 remained in the South Pacific until Japan capitulated. She then returned home, decommissioning and entering the Atlantic Reserve Fleet at Green Cove Springs, Florida, in 1946. While berthed in Florida, late in 1948, or early 1949, she was redesignated and named USS Mallard (AMCU-30).

== Post-war reactivation ==
Reactivated at Charleston, South Carolina, during the Korean War in June 1952, Mallard operated on the United States East Coast as an underwater mine detector until after the s:Korean Armistice Agreement was signed in July 1953.

== Final decommissioning ==
Decommissioning again in July 1954, she again entered the Reserve Fleet, where, as before, she was reclassified, now to MHC-30. Struck from the Navy List on 1 January 1960, Mallard was sold to Randolph Mattson on 30 June 1960.

LCI(L)-963 received four battle stars for her World War II service.
