= USS Owl (AMCU-35) =

Minesweeper of the United States Navy

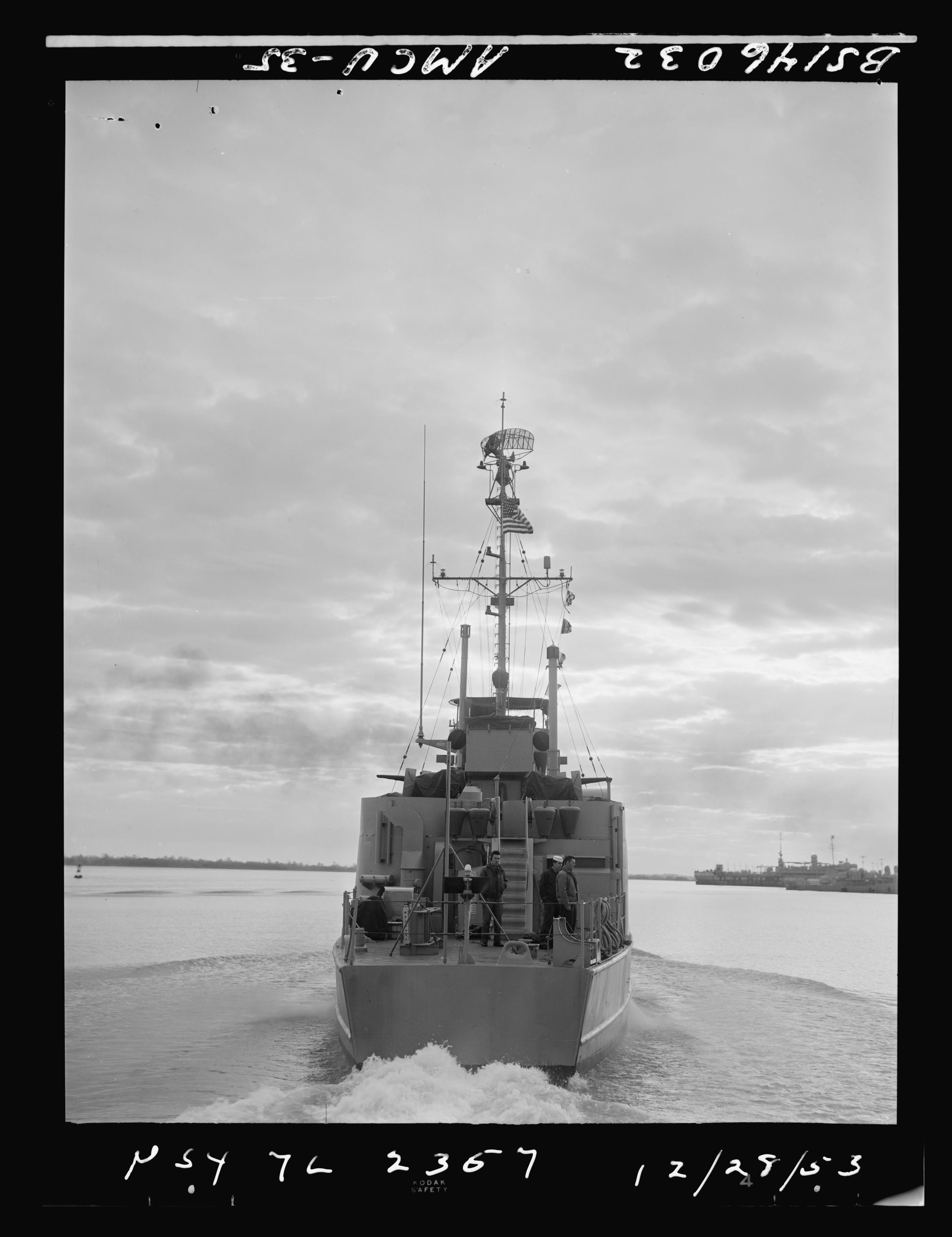

History

United States
- Name: USS Owl
- Builder: Consolidated Steel Corporation, Orange, Texas
- Laid down: 23 March 1944
- Launched: 18 April 1944
- Commissioned: 16 May 1944, as USS LCI(L)-982
- Decommissioned: 24 June 1946
- Recommissioned: 19 December 1953, as USS Owl (AMCU-35)
- Decommissioned: 1 November 1957
- Reclassified: LSIL-982, 1949; AMCU-35, 1953; MHC-35, 7 February 1955
- Stricken: 17 October 1957
- Honors and awards: 2 battle stars (World War II)
- Fate: Sold for scrap, 8 July 1960

General characteristics
- Class & type: LCI(L)-351-class large landing craft
- Displacement: 209 long tons (212 t)
- Length: 159 ft (48 m)
- Beam: 23 ft 8 in (7.21 m)
- Draft: 5 ft 8 in (1.73 m)
- Propulsion: 8 × GM diesel engines (4 per shaft), 1,600 bhp (1,193 kW); 2 × variable pitch propellers
- Speed: 14.4 knots (26.7 km/h; 16.6 mph)
- Complement: 40
- Armament: 5 × single 20 mm AA guns

USS Owl (AMCU-35) was a LCI(L)-351-class large landing craft of the United States Navy, later converted to an AMCU-7-class coastal minesweeper.

The ship was laid down on 23 March 1944 by Consolidated Steel Corporation, Orange, Texas, launched on 18 April 1944, and was commissioned as USS LCI(L)–982 on 16 May 1944.

== World War II Pacific operations ==
After conducting landing exercises and other aspects of her shakedown, LCI(L)–982 departed Galveston, Texas, on 10 June 1944, en route to the southwest Pacific war zone. Transiting the Panama Canal on 19 June she sailed the southern route to the Admiralty Islands arriving at Manus early in August. For six weeks she supported operations at Humboldt Bay and Maffin Bay, New Guinea prior to steaming on 16 October for the Leyte, Philippines invasion scene.

== Philippine invasion support ==
From this base she embarked elements of the 503rd Parachute Infantry Regiment, 24th Infantry Division who first stepped ashore at Mindoro on 15 December. Early in January 1945 her LCI(L) Group 45 loaded Rangers of the 6th Battalion who landed on 10 January via U.S. Army DUKWs on Blue Beach, Lingayen Gulf, Luzon, where high surf proved more of an obstacle than the Japanese. Employed on inter-Philippine island logistic missions until the end of the war, LCI(L) Group 45 then came under control of Commander, Yangtze Patrol. Sailing via Okinawa, she arrived Shanghai early in October but on the 10th was redirected to Ningpoo. Here troops of the 70th Chinese Army boarded and two days later debarked to complete the occupation of Formosa.

== Return to the US ==
Not involved in further troop movements, she departed the China coast on 1 December. Again transiting the Panama Canal LCI(L)-982 reported at Green Cove Springs, Florida, on 20 May 1946 and decommissioned on 24 June joining the 16th Reserve Fleet.

== Reclassified as AMCU ==
Reclassified first in 1949 as LSIL-982, the Korean War brought conversion at Charleston, South Carolina, to an AMCU and recommissioning as USS Owl (AMCU–35) on 19 December 1953. Owl departed in January 1954 for the 15th Naval District arriving at Balboa, Panama Canal Zone on 5 February. Beside serving as a mine-hunting harbor defense ship she conducted a two-week Reserve Training cruise to Cartagena, Colombia in December 1954. Reclassified MHC-35 on 7 February 1955, her basic duties remained the same until 2 August 1957 when she departed the Naval Station Rodman, Canal Zone, for Boston and retirement.

== Decommissioning ==
USS Owl (MHC–35) decommissioned for the last time on 1 November 1957 and was struck from the Navy List on 17 October 1957.

== Awards ==
As LCI(L)-982 she received 2 battle stars for World War II service.
