= USS LCI(L)-760 =

History

United States
- Name: USS LCI(L)-760
- Commissioned: 26 May 1944
- Decommissioned: 1946
- Reclassified: LCI(G)-760, 31 December 1944; LCI(M)-760, 30 April 1945
- Fate: Sold, 20 January 1947

General characteristics
- Class & type: LCI-351-class Landing Craft Infantry (Large)
- Displacement: 246 long tons (250 t) light; 264 long tons (268 t) landing; 419 long tons (426 t) loaded
- Length: 158 ft 5.5 in (48.298 m)
- Beam: 23 ft 3 in (7.09 m)
- Draft: Light : 3 ft 1.5 in (0.953 m) mean; Landing : 2 ft 8 in (0.81 m) forward; 4 ft 10 in (1.47 m) aft; Loaded : 5 ft 4 in (1.63 m) forward; 5 ft 11 in (1.80 m) aft
- Propulsion: 8 × General Motors diesel engines, 4 per shaft, 1,600 bhp (1,193 kW); 2 variable-pitch propellers; 130 tons fuel, 200 gallons lube oil
- Speed: 14 knots (26 km/h; 16 mph) maximum continuous; 16 knots (30 km/h; 18 mph) maximum
- Range: 4,000 nmi (7,400 km) at 12 kn (22 km/h; 14 mph); 500 nmi (930 km) at 15 kn (28 km/h; 17 mph)
- Capacity: LCI(L) : 75 tons cargo
- Troops: LCI(L) : 6 Officers, 182 Enlisted
- Complement: LCI(L) : 4 Officers, 24 Enlisted; LCI(G) : 5 Officers, 65 Enlisted; LCI(M) : 4 Officers, 49 Enlisted
- Armament: LCI(L) : 5 × single 20 mm guns; LCI(G) : 2 × 40 mm guns; 4 × 20 mm guns; 6 × .50 cal (12.7 mm) machine guns; 10 × Mk.7 rocket launchers; LCI(M) : 1 × 40 mm gun; 4 × 20 mm guns; 3 × M2 4.2 in (110 mm) chemical mortars
- Armor: 2-inch (51 mm) plastic splinter protection on gun turrets, conning tower and pilot house

USS LCI(L)-760 was an LCI-351-class Landing Craft Infantry (Large), laid down and launched on dates unknown. Commissioned on 26 May 1944 as USS LCI(L)-760, reclassified LCI(G)-760 (Gunboat) on 31 December 1944, and again reclassified as LCI(M)-760 (Mortar) on 30 April 1945.

LCI(M)-760 was assigned to the Pacific and took part in two combat actions, the Iwo Jima landings (as LCI(G)-760) from 19 to 26 February 1945 and the Okinawa landings from 26 March 1945 to 14 June 1945. According to renowned Naval historian, Samuel Eliot Morison, she was lightly damaged by a near miss from a coastal battery, while configured as LCI(M), at Iwo Jima, wounding two, on 25 February 1945.

After Victory over Japan Day, LCI(M)-760 performed occupation duty in Japan from 18 September 1945 to 2 April 1946. LCI(M)-760 was based out of the port of Nagasaki, Japan for some if not all of this time. Duties included transportation of U.S. Marines to outlying islands to take surrender of Japanese garrisons, and other fleet duties.

LCI(M)-760 was decommissioned, date unknown and was struck from the Naval Vessel Register. Sold on 20 January 1947, LCI(M)-760's fate is not known.

LCI(G)-760 received one battle star for World War II service. LCI(M)-760 received one battle star for World War II service.
