= USS Jacamar (AMCU-25) =

Minesweeper of the United States Navy

History

United States
- Name: USS Jacamar
- Builder: New Jersey Shipbuilding Corporation, Barber, New Jersey
- Laid down: 1 September 1944, as LCI(L)-870
- Launched: 2 October 1944
- Commissioned: 9 October 1944
- Reclassified: LSIL, 28 February 1949; USS Jacamar (AMCU-25), 7 March 1952
- Fate: Sold 21 July 1960

General characteristics
- Class & type: LCI(L)-351-class large landing craft
- Displacement: 386 long tons (392 t) full
- Length: 163 ft 4 in (49.78 m)
- Beam: 23 ft 3 in (7.09 m)
- Draft: 5 ft 8 in (1.73 m)
- Propulsion: 8 × GM diesel engines (4 per shaft), 1,600 bhp (1,193 kW); 2 × variable pitch propellers
- Speed: 14.4 knots (26.7 km/h; 16.6 mph)
- Range: 8,000 nmi (15,000 km) at 12 kn (22 km/h; 14 mph)
- Capacity: 75 long tons (76 t)
- Troops: 9 officers, 200 enlisted
- Complement: 4 officers, 25 enlisted
- Armament: 5 × 20 mm AA guns

USS Jacamar (AMCU-25), was a LCI(L)-351-class large landing craft of the United States Navy.

== History ==
Laid down on 1 September 1944, by the New Jersey Shipbuilding Corporation of Barber, New Jersey, the ship was launched on 2 October 1944, commissioned as USS LCI(L)-870 on 9 October 1944, and decommissioned in 1954. She was commissioned in 1944 and decommissioned after 1954.

=== Conversion to minesweeper ===
Laid up in the Reserve Fleet, her designation changed to Landing Ship Infantry (Large) LSIL, on 28 February 1949, and the ship was authorized for conversion to Coastal Minesweeper (Underwater Locator), in FY 1952 at Puget Sound Naval Shipyard, Bremerton, Washington. Renamed USS Jacamar (AMCU-25) on 7 March 1952, conversion began on 3 August 1953, was completed on 1 February 1954, and the ship was recommissioned as USS Jacamar (AMCU-25) on 1 December 1954.

=== Fate ===
Jacamar was sold on 21 July 1960.

== Additional characteristics ==
- Armor, 10-lb. STS plating to splinter shields, pilothouse, and conning station.
- Fuel Capacity, 110 tons, lube oil 240 gallons.
