= USS Kestrel (AMCU-26) =

Minesweeper of the United States Navy

History

United States
- Name: USS Kestrel
- Builder: New Jersey Shipbuilding Company, Barber, New Jersey
- Laid down: 7 September 1944
- Launched: 6 October 1944
- Commissioned: 13 October 1944, as USS LCI(L)-874
- Decommissioned: 10 July 1946
- Recommissioned: 8 February 1954, as USS Kestrel (AMCU-26)
- Decommissioned: 2 December 1957
- Reclassified: AMCU-26, 7 March 1952; MHC-26, February 1955
- Fate: Sold, 28 June 1960

General characteristics
- Class & type: LCI(L)-351-class large landing craft
- Displacement: 216 long tons (219 t) light; 234 long tons (238 t) landing
- Length: 159 ft (48 m)
- Beam: 24 ft (7.3 m)
- Draft: 6 ft (1.8 m)
- Propulsion: 8 × GM diesel engines (4 per shaft), 1,600 bhp (1,193 kW); 2 × variable pitch propellers
- Speed: 14 knots (26 km/h; 16 mph)
- Complement: 2 officers, 21 enlisted
- Armament: 5 × 20 mm AA guns

USS Kestrel (AMCU-26) was an LCI(L)-351-class large landing craft of the United States Navy, later converted to an AMCU-7-class Coastal Minesweeper (Underwater Locator).

The ship was laid down on 7 September 1944 by the New Jersey Shipbuilding Company, of Barber, New Jersey, launched on 6 October 1944, and commissioned as USS LSI(L)-874 on 13 October 1944.

== Service history ==
=== 1944–1946 ===
Following shakedown and training off the Atlantic coast, LCI(L)-874 departed Key West, Florida on 25 November for the Pacific. She engaged in additional training after arriving in San Diego, California on 13 December. Departing on 29 January 1945, she touched Pearl Harbor, Eniwetok, and Guam before arriving at Peleliu on 12 April. She performed picket and patrol duty in the Palau Islands during the remaining months of World War II.

From September 1945 to February 1946, LCI(L)-874 operated between the Palau and Mariana Islands, providing mail and shuttle service among the Islands. Departing Eniwetok on 4 February she arrived in San Pedro, California, a month later. Sailing to Oregon in May LCI(L)-874 was decommissioned there on 10 July 1946 and joined the Pacific Reserve Fleet.

=== 1952–1957 ===
She was reclassified as a Coastal Minesweeper (Underwater Locator), and renamed USS Kestrel (AMCU-26) on 7 March 1952. Conversion to AMCU-26 began 24 August 1953 at the Puget Sound Naval Shipyard, Bremerton, Washington, and was completed on 1 March 1954.

Kestrel was recommissioned on 8 February 1954. After shakedown and training, she arrived in San Diego, California, on 27 March for operations in the 11th Naval District. From 1954 to 1957, Kestrel operated out of San Diego on underwater mine location exercises. She was reclassified as a Coastal Minehunter, MHC-26, in February 1955.

Kestrel was decommissioned in San Diego on 2 December 1957. She was sold to Murphy Marine Service on 28 June 1960.
