= USS Partridge (AMCU-36) =

Minesweeper of the United States Navy

History

United States
- Name: USS Partridge
- Builder: Consolidated Steel Corporation, Orange, Texas
- Laid down: 18 April 1944
- Launched: 13 May 1944
- Commissioned: 10 June 1944, as USS LCI(L)-1001
- Decommissioned: March 1947
- Recommissioned: 1950
- Decommissioned: Early 1956
- Reclassified: AMCU-36, 7 March 1952; LSIL-1001, July 1954
- Stricken: 7 August 1956
- Honors and awards: 2 battle stars (World War II)
- Fate: Sold for scrap, 8 July 1960

General characteristics
- Class & type: LCI(L)-351-class large landing craft
- Displacement: 260 long tons (264 t)
- Length: 159 ft (48 m)
- Beam: 23 ft 8 in (7.21 m)
- Draft: 5 ft 8 in (1.73 m)
- Propulsion: 8 × GM diesel engines (4 per shaft), 1,600 bhp (1,193 kW); 2 × variable pitch propellers
- Speed: 14.4 knots (26.7 km/h; 16.6 mph)
- Complement: 41
- Armament: 2 × single 20 mm AA guns

USS Partridge (LCIL-1001/LSIL-1001/AMCU-36) was a LCI(L)-351-class large landing craft of the United States Navy.

The ship was laid down by the Consolidated Steel Corporation, Orange, Texas, on 18 April 1944, launched on 13 May, and commissioned on 10 June 1944 as USS LCIL-1001.

== Service history ==
After shakedown in the Gulf of Mexico, she operated in that area and along the east coast until she decommissioned at Green Cove Springs, Florida, in March 1947.

== Established as a Training Ship ==
Reclassified as LSIL-1001 in 1949, she recommissioned in 1950. Based at Norfolk, Virginia, she served as a training ship for auxiliary minesweeper crews. Scheduled for conversion to an AMCU minehunter, she was named Partridge and reclassified AMCU-36 on 7 March 1952. However, her conversion was cancelled and she was reclassified and renamed LSIL-1001 in July 1954.

== Decommissioning ==
Decommissioned in early 1956, she was struck from the Navy List on 7 August 1956 and scrapped.
