= USS LCI(L)-367 =

The LCI 367 was commissioned August 23, 1943 and decommissioned October 2, 1946. It was a landing craft flotilla ship commanded by Lieutenant Saul Charles Smiley USNR. The LCI was part of Group eleven, Flotilla four, and most notably was part of the capture and occupation of Okinawa during World War II.

== History ==
The ship was laid down on 26 July 1943 by George Lawley & Son shipyard in Neponset, Massachusetts.

== Campaigns ==
- Assault, capture and occupation of Okinawa Japan. May 14 to June 30, 1945.

== Crew ==
Known crewmen to have served on the LCI 367 include:

- Edward Harrison Able
- Warren Webster Dark
- Francis Xavier Fenton
- Edward Harrison Fenton
- Vasillios Emmanuel Georgiades
- William Bruce Glass
- Ray Morgan
- Andrew Joseph Milanese
- Umberto Bonosoro
- Ralph Chester Brown
- Lilton Lewis Butler
- Gertha Geroy Gannon
- Anthony Joseph Columbus
- Andrew Joseph Milanese
- Richard Joseph Gasar
- George Roy Gullion
- Robert Ellsworth Haupt
- James Hobbs
- Frederick Curtis Jewel
- Leonard Granville Marshal
- Pete Paulus
- Edward Joseph Porambo
- Harold Eugene McCauslin
- Doland James Preston
- Harry Ferguson Taylor
- Virgil Gale Whitmyer
- Charles Edward Younger
- Lt. Harris Brown
