= USS Skimmer (AMCU-41) =

Minesweeper of the United States Navy

History

United States
- Name: USS LCI(L)-1093
- Builder: Defoe Shipbuilding Company; Bay City, Michigan
- Laid down: 11 September 1944
- Launched: 23 September 1944
- Commissioned: 28 September 1944
- Decommissioned: July 1946
- In service: 20 April 1947 as Naval Reserve training ship
- Out of service: January 1950
- Renamed: USS Avocet (AMCU-41), 7 March 1952
- Namesake: avocet
- Refit: 15 August 1953 – 15 February 1954; Charleston Naval Shipyard
- Recommissioned: 23 January 1954
- Reclassified: MHC-41, 7 February 1955
- Decommissioned: 1 July 1955
- Stricken: 1 January 1960
- Fate: fate unknown

General characteristics
- Displacement: 387 (full)
- Length: 159 ft 0 in (48.46 m)
- Beam: 23 ft 8 in (7.21 m)
- Draft: 5 ft 8 in (1.73 m)
- Propulsion: two sets of 4 GM diesels, 4 per shaft, BHP 1,600, twin variable pitch propellers
- Speed: 14.4 knots (tl.)
- Endurance: 4,000 nautical miles (7,400 km) at 12 knots (22 km/h); 500 nautical miles (930 km) at 15 knots (28 km/h) loaded, 110 tons of fuel
- Capacity: 75 tons
- Troops: 6 Officers, 182 Enlisted
- Complement: 4 officers, 24 enlisted
- Armament: 5 × 20 mm guns

USS Skimmer (AMCU-41/LCIL-1093) was an LCI(L)-351-class landing craft infantry built for the U.S. Navy for the task of landing troops in combat areas.

The second ship to be named Skimmer by the Navy was laid down as LCI(L)-1093, a large, infantry landing craft, on 11 September 1944 by the Defoe Shipbuilding Company in Bay City, Michigan; launched on 23 September 1944; and commissioned on 28 September 1944.

== World War II service ==
LCI(L)-1093 made her way through Lake Michigan and the Chicago Drainage Canal, down the Illinois River and the Mississippi River, and arrived at New Orleans, Louisiana, on 11 October 1944. She drydocked at New Orleans, then commenced her shakedown cruise to Galveston, Texas. After completing shakedown and amphibious training, she departed Galveston on 25 November 1944.

=== Transfer to the Pacific Theatre ===
She transited the Panama Canal on 1 December, and arrived in San Diego, California, on the 18th. In mid-February 1945, following further exercises and training at San Diego, LCI(L)-1093 got underway for Pearl Harbor, Hawaii, en route to Guam in the Marianas. She entered Pearl Harbor on 11 March and departed soon thereafter, visiting Eniwetok Atoll along the way to the Marianas. She arrived at Guam on 8 April and stayed there until 24 April.

=== Saipan and Okinawa operations ===
From there she sailed to Saipan and, after about a month of miscellaneous duties there, headed for Okinawa. She spent the next month, 30 May to 30 June, providing smoke screens, carrying troops and supplies, and helping other landing craft retract from the beaches.

=== End-of-war operations ===
The conquest of Okinawa was fairly well complete by the end of June, but the LCI(L) continued to operate in that vicinity until 12 September. At that time, she was sent to Japan where she performed a number of duties, including ferrying allied prisoners-of-war to Guam and supporting the occupation forces in the Tokyo area. LCI (L)-1093 departed Japan on 14 April 1946. Sailing via Guam and Pearl Harbor, she arrived at San Diego on 10 June. By mid-July, she had retransmitted the Panama Canal and had arrived in Boston, Massachusetts. She then decommissioned at Boston and was towed to the berthing area at Hingham, Massachusetts.

== Reactivation in 1947 ==
She returned to Boston, Massachusetts, on 20 April 1947, and for almost three years, served the 1st Naval District as a U.S. Naval Reserve training ship. In January 1950, she was taken to Charleston, South Carolina, to be inactivated. This time, she was berthed at Green Cove Springs, Florida.

== Reactivation in 1953 as AMCU-41 ==
In August 1953, she returned to Charleston to be converted to a coastal minesweeper AMCU-41. On 23 January 1954, the ship was commissioned as Skimmer (AMCU-41), Lieutenant W. M. Gattis commanding. She was assigned to the 1st Naval District in late February 1954 and, on 6 March, departed Charleston for Boston.

She headed via the Chesapeake Bay, Chesapeake and Delaware Canal, the East River, Long Island Sound, and the Cape Cod Canal and arrived in Boston on 14 March. She operated in the 1st Naval District for the next year participating in LANTSUBMINEX-54 and LANTFLTEX-55 and representing the 1st Naval District at the Rhode Island State American Legion Convention from 18 to 20 June 1954.

== Final deactivation and decommissioning ==
On 1 March 1955, she commenced Phase Able inactivation at Boston and was redesignated MHC-41. By 20 April, she was back at Charleston, South Carolina, beginning Phase Baker inactivation. Finally, on 1 July 1955, Skimmer decommissioned at Charleston and was berthed there as a unit of the Atlantic Reserve Fleet. In 1958, she was moved to the berthing area at Green Cove Springs, Florida; and, on 1 January 1960, her name was struck from the Navy list.

== Military awards and honors ==
Skimmer (LCI(L)-1093) received one battle star for World War II service.
