= USS LCI(L)-222 =

History

United States
- Name: USS LCI(L)-222
- Builder: George Lawley & Sons; Neponset, Massachusetts
- Laid down: 17 October 1942
- Launched: 29 November 1942
- Commissioned: 3 December 1942
- Stricken: 1946
- Fate: Sold on 7 November 1946

General characteristics
- Class & type: Landing Craft Infantry
- Displacement: 216 t.(light), 234 t.(landing), 389 t.(loaded)
- Length: 158 ft 5.5 in (48.298 m)
- Beam: 23 ft 3 in (7.09 m)
- Draft: Light, 3 ft 1.5 in (0.953 m) mean; Landing, 2 ft 8 in (0.81 m) fwd, 4 ft 10 in (1.47 m) aft; Loaded, 5 ft 4 in (1.63 m) fwd, 5 ft 11 in (1.80 m) aft
- Propulsion: 2 sets of 4 General Motors diesels, 4 per shaft, BHP 1,600, twin variable pitch propellers
- Speed: 16 kn (30 km/h) (max.); 14 knots (26 km/h) maximum continuous
- Endurance: 4,000 nmi (7,400 km) at 12 kn (22 km/h), loaded, 500 nautical miles (930 km) at 15 kn (28 km/h); and 110 tons of fuel
- Capacity: 75 tons cargo
- Troops: 6 Officers, 182 Enlisted
- Complement: 3 officers, 21 enlisted
- Armament: 4 × 20 mm AA guns; 2 × .50" machine guns
- Armor: 2" plastic splinter protection on gun turrets, conning tower, and pilot house

USS LCI(L)222 was a United States Navy ship classified as a Landing Craft Infantry Large. She was assigned to the Asiatic-Pacific Theater during World War II.

LCI-222 was laid down on 17 October 1942, at George Lawley & Sons Corp., Neponset, Massachusetts and launched on 29 November 1942. She received her commission on 3 December 1942.

During World War II USS LCI(L)-222 was assigned to the Asiatic-Pacific Theater and participated in the New Georgia Group operations, the New Georgia-Rendova-Vangunu occupation from 1 to 4 July 1943, the Vella Level occupation on 15 August 1943, the Treasury Island-Bougainville operation and the Treasury Island landing, on 27 October 1943, and the occupation and defense of Cape Torokina, on 3 and 4 December 1943. USS LCI(L)-222 was at Eniwetok Atoll, Marshall Islands on 8 December 1945 en route from Tiapan to Pearl Harbor.
