= USS LCI(L)-652 =

History

United States
- Name: USS Accentor
- Laid down: 10 June 1944
- Launched: 13 July 1944
- Commissioned: 19 July 1944
- Decommissioned: 19 July 1946
- Stricken: 18 September 1956
- Fate: Sunk as target, 13 August 1958

General characteristics
- Class & type: Landing Craft Infantry
- Displacement: 387 long tons (393 t)
- Length: 159 ft (48 m)
- Beam: 23 ft 8 in (7.21 m)
- Draft: 5 ft 8 in (1.73 m)
- Speed: 14.4 knots (26.7 km/h; 16.6 mph)
- Complement: 40
- Armament: 5 × 20 mm guns

USS Accentor (LCI(L)-652/LSIL-652/AMCU-15) was an LCI(L)-351-class landing craft infantry in the service of the United States Navy, named after the accentor bird.

She was laid down as the unnamed LCI(L)-652 on 10 June 1944 at Barber, New Jersey by New Jersey Shipbuilding, launched on 13 July 1944, and commissioned on 19 July 1944.

After shakedown training during the summer of 1944, the large infantry landing craft joined the Pacific Fleet. She operated in various rear areas of the Pacific Ocean through the end of World War II and, after Japan capitulated in mid-August 1945, continued similar activity into the summer of 1946. On 19 July of that year, LCI(L)-652 was placed out of commission and was berthed with the Columbia River Group of the Pacific Reserve Fleet. While inactive during the remainder of her Navy career, she was redesignated LSIL-652 on 28 February 1949. Late in October 1950, the ship was nominated for conversion to an underwater mine locator ship. Accordingly, she was named Accentor and redesignated AMCU-15 on 7 March 1952. In May 1952, she was reassigned from the Columbia River Group to the Bremerton Group in preparation for her reconditioning.

However, Accentor never returned to active service. Her conversion was cancelled on 22 January 1954, and she remained inactive at Bremerton, Washington. On 1 July 1954, her name and new classification were also cancelled, and she reverted to LSIL-652. She was struck from the Navy list on 18 September 1956 and was sunk as a target on 13 August 1958 about 70 miles (110 km) off the Strait of Juan de Fuca.
