= USS LCI(L)-1091 =

Coordinates: 40.81888°N 124.18073°W

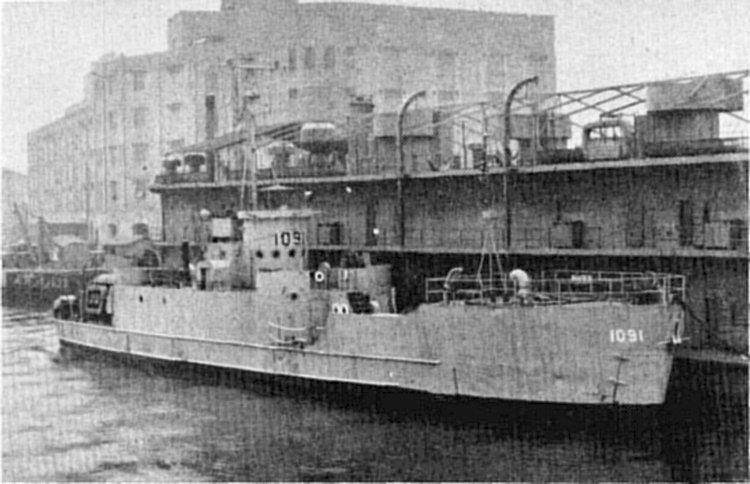

History

United States
- Name: LCI(L)-1091 (1944-1949); LSIL-1091 (1949-1955)
- Builder: Defoe Shipbuilding Company; Bay City, Michigan
- Yard number: 344
- Laid down: 31 August 1944
- Launched: 14 September 1944
- Commissioned: 21 September 1944
- Decommissioned: 1955
- Honors and awards: as LCI(L)-1091: 2 battle stars, World War II; as LSIL-1091: 4 battle stars, Korean War

History

United States
- Name: Bering Sea (1961-1988); Ten-Ninety-One (1988-present)
- Owner: unknown (1961-1985); Dr. Ralph Davis (1985-2005); Humboldt Bay Naval Sea/Air Museum (2005-present)
- Identification: IMO number: 7051644; US Official Number 285125
- Status: Currently preserved ashore at Eureka, CA. since December 2016.

General characteristics
- Class & type: LCI(L)-351-class large landing craft
- Displacement: 236 t.(light), 264 t.(landing), 419 t.(loaded)
- Length: 158 ft 5.5 in (48.298 m)
- Beam: 23 ft 3 in (7.09 m)
- Draft: Light, 3 ft 1.5 in (0.953 m) mean; Landing, 2 ft 8 in (0.81 m) fwd, 4 ft 10 in (1.47 m) aft; Loaded, 5 ft 4 in (1.63 m) fwd, 5 ft 11 in (1.80 m) aft
- Propulsion: 2 sets of 4 General Motors diesels, 4 per shaft, BHP 1,600, twin variable pitch propellers
- Speed: 16 knots (30 km/h) (max.); 14 knots (26 km/h) maximum continuous
- Endurance: 4,000 miles at 12 knots, loaded, 500 miles at 15 knots; and 110 tons of fuel
- Capacity: 75 tons cargo
- Troops: 6 Officers, 182 Enlisted
- Complement: 4 officers, 24 enlisted
- Armament: 5 × 20 mm AA guns; 2 × .50" machine guns
- Armor: 2" plastic splinter protection on gun turrets, conning tower, and pilot house

USS LCI(L)-1091 is an LCI(L)-351-class large landing craft built for the United States Navy in World War II. Like most ships of her class, she was not named and known only by her designation.

== Operational history ==
LCI(L)-1091 was laid down at Defoe Shipbuilding Company in Bay City, Michigan, and commissioned on 21 September 1944.

LCI-1091 arrived in the Pacific at the end of the battle for Iwo Jima, fought at Okinawa in 1945 and was used as a minesweeper to clean up around Japan after the war. She was assigned to the Pacific Theatre and participated in the assault and occupation of Okinawa Gunto from 28 April to 30 June 1945. She received two battle stars for her WW II duty.

The landing craft performed minesweeping duties in the Kōchi-Shikoku area from 8 September to 16 September, and in the Nagoya area from 28 September to 25 October.

LCI(L)-1091 was on occupation duty from 2 September to 16 December 1945. In 1946 she participated in the Operation Crossroads atomic bomb tests at Bikini Atoll as a testing support ship.

On 28 February 1949, she was, like all other LCIs remaining, reclassified as LSIL-1091.

The ship remained active during the Korean War. In 1951 she was converted to a Laboratory Ship. During her time in Korea, LSIL-1091 was assigned as an Epidemiological Control Ship for Fleet Epidemic Disease Control Unit No. 1, a part of the U.S. effort to combat malaria in Korea. From October to September 1951, LSIL-1091 was at Koje-do performing malaria testing among residents and refugees. In this role, the ship became tied to unproven allegations of biological warfare in the Korean War by the United States and allies.

She was used in a covert missions behind enemy lines investigating disease outbreak of alleged bubonic plague in North Korea. Brigadier General Crawford Sams' "medical intelligence" mission to Wonsan, North Korea in March 1951 had been first launched from the LSIL-1091.

After Korea the LSIL-1091 became one of the navy's smallest aircraft carriers when she was used to launch anti-aircraft target drones.

In 1955 she was decommissioned at Astoria, Oregon.

LCI(L)-1091 received two battle stars for World War II action and received four battle stars for Korean War as LSIL-1091.

== Post-service and museum ==
LSIL-1091 was sold for commercial use, renamed Bering Sea and operated as a cannery ship for salmon on the Yukon River in Alaska from 1961 until 1985. In 1988 she was purchased by LCI veteran Dr. Ralph Davis of McKinleyville, California and renamed Ten-Ninety-One. He moved her to Eureka, California, where she fished for albacore from 1995 until 2003.

LCI(L)-1091 had been in continuous use for most of her 65-year life and remains in near original condition. In 2005, she was donated by Davis to be a museum ship for the Humboldt Bay Naval Sea/Air Museum at Eureka, and opened to the public during restoration. The Humboldt Amateur Radio Club often ran a Special Event Amateur Radio station out of the original radio room. Subsequently, little restoration work was undertaken and the ship was moved to different berths.

By 2016 Ten-Ninety-One was in poor condition and would have become a serious liability if allowed to sink in Humboldt Bay; consequently it was decided to put her ashore where the risks would be lower, and where restoration could be progressed more easily. It currently resides on the beach near the town of Samoa, California.

== See also ==
Priolo, Garry P. "USS LSIL-1091". NavSource.
