= Tanager (disambiguation) =

Tanager is a family of birds. It may also refer to:

Birds

- Bay-headed tanager
- Hepatic tanager
- Passerini's tanager
- Summer tanager
- Scarlet tanager
- Spotted tanager
- Western tanager
- etc. - about 900 articles - see Category:Tanagers

Aircraft

- Curtiss Tanager

Expeditions

- Tanager Expedition (1923–1924)

Military operations

- Operation Tanager – Australia's contribution to the United Nations Mission of Support to East Timor (UNMISET)

Places

- Tanager (river)

Ships

- USS Tanager
- USS Tanager (AM-5)
- USS Tanager (AM-385)
