= USS Sprig =

Minesweeper of the United States Navy

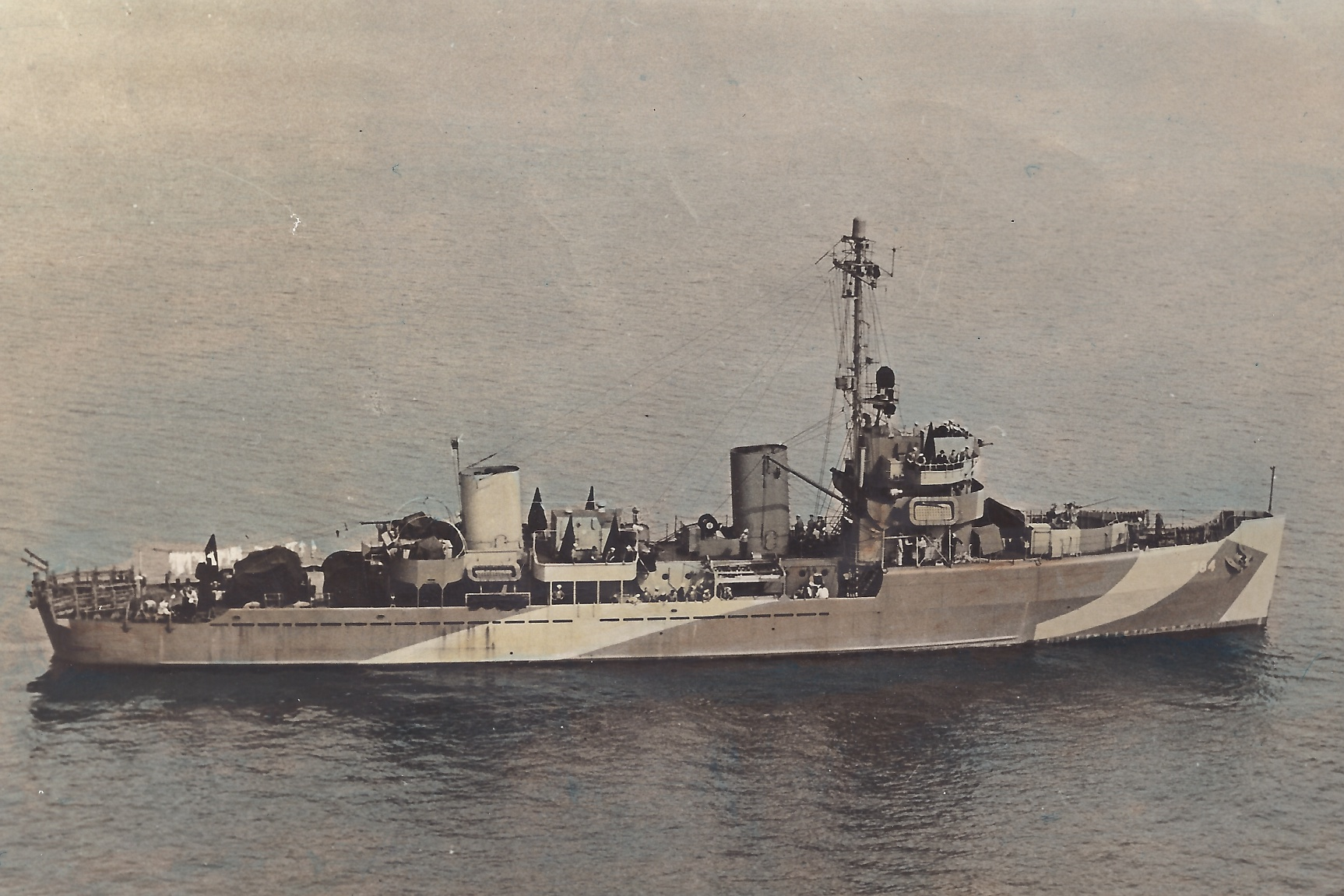
- USS Sprig AM-384 Auk-Class Minesweeper

History

United States
- Name: USS Sprig
- Builder: American Ship Building Co., Lorain, Ohio
- Laid down: 15 February 1944
- Launched: 15 September 1944
- Commissioned: 4 April 1945
- Decommissioned: June 1954
- Reclassified: MSF-384, 7 February 1955
- Stricken: 1 July 1972
- Honours and awards: 1 battle stars (World War II)
- Fate: Sold for scrap, 20 December 1973

General characteristics
- Class & type: Auk-class minesweeper
- Displacement: 890 long tons (904 t)
- Length: 221 ft 3 in (67.44 m)
- Beam: 32 ft (9.8 m)
- Draft: 10 ft 9 in (3.28 m)
- Speed: 18 knots (33 km/h; 21 mph)
- Complement: 100 officers and enlisted
- Armament: 1 × 3"/50 caliber gun; 2 × 40 mm guns; 2 × 20 mm guns; 2 × Depth charge tracks

USS Sprig (AM-384) was an Auk-class minesweeper acquired by the United States Navy for the dangerous task of removing mines from minefields laid in the water to prevent ships from passing.

Sprig was named after the "sprig", an inland duck, common to the entire Northern Hemisphere; also known as sprigtail or pintail. It is a very distinct species and derives its name from the great prolongation and narrowness of the middle pair of tail-feathers, which is particularly noticeable in the male.

Sprig was laid down on 15 February 1944 by the American Ship Building Company at Lorain, Ohio; launched on 15 September 1944; sponsored by Mrs. John Sherwin; and commissioned on 4 April 1945.

== East Coast operations ==
On 15 April, the minesweeper started down the Saint Lawrence Seaway from Cleveland, Ohio. After stops at Montreal, Quebec, and Halifax, she arrived at Boston on 5 May. There she executed her first minesweeping trials and had her sound gear and depth charge equipment removed. She put to sea on 16 July and reached Hampton Roads, Virginia, the next day. Sprig conducted shakedown training at Little Creek, Virginia, until 6 September when she got underway for the Pacific. She was in the Panama Canal Zone from 12 to 14 September; then headed via Acapulco, Mexico, to San Pedro, California, arriving there on the 24th.

== Pacific Ocean operations ==
After almost two weeks on the U.S. West Coast, Sprig continued west on 6 October and made Pearl Harbor on the 20th. On the 31st, she sailed from Pearl Harbor bound for the western Pacific. She stopped briefly at Eniwetok and Saipan and made Wakayama, Japan, on 28 November. For the next five months, Sprig participated in the major minesweeping operation conducted in the immediate postwar period. In December 1945, she swept mines in the Tsushima Strait. She conducted minesweeping practice and sweeping operations at Tachibana Wan, Kyūshū, in January 1946. Sprig moved to Shanghai, China, in February and returned to Sasebo, Japan, on 2 March. Later that month, the minesweeper began duty as courier ship, carrying mail and supplies to United States ships on station in the waters between Japan and Korea. In April, she herself took up one such station, relieving Champion (AM-314), then Murrelet (AM-372) later in the month. Her commanding officer served as Commander, CTU 96.6.3, until 26 April, supervising minesweeping operations at Saishu To, off the southern coast of Korea.

== Reassignment to East Coast operations ==
On the 26th, she headed back to Sasebo and, on 1 May, got underway to return to the United States. She stopped at Pearl Harbor from 17 to 25 May and made San Pedro, California, on the 31st. On 7 June, she sailed south toward the Panama Canal as OTC of a unit composed of PCE-843, YMS-430, and YMS-112.

She transited the canal and departed Coco Solo, Panama Canal Zone, on 20 June. On the 27th, she entered Charleston, South Carolina, and reported for duty to the Commander, Mine Force, Atlantic Fleet (COMINLANT). For the next eight years, Sprig served COMINLANT, sailing the length of the Atlantic seaboard and into the Caribbean at times. During this period, she was home ported at Charleston.

== Decommissioning ==
In June 1954, Sprig was decommissioned and placed in reserve at Orange, Texas. On 7 February 1955, Sprig was reclassified a fleet minesweeper, MSF-384. After 18 years with the Atlantic Reserve Fleet, Sprig's name was struck from the Navy list on 1 July 1972. Her hulk was sold on 20 December 1973 to Southern Scrap Material Co., Ltd., of New Orleans, Louisiana, for scrapping.

== Awards ==
Sprig received one battle star for World War II service.

== Abbreviations used ==
- MSF - MineSweeper, Fleet
- CTU - Commander, Task Unit
- OTC - Officer in Tactical Command
- COMINLANT - Commander, Mine Forces, Atlantic
