= USS Pigeon (AM-374) =

Minesweeper of the United States Navy

History

United States
- Name: USS Pigeon
- Builder: Savannah Machine and Foundry Co., Savannah, Georgia
- Laid down: 10 November 1944
- Launched: 28 March 1945
- Commissioned: 30 October 1945
- Decommissioned: 10 July 1946
- Recommissioned: 30 November 1950
- Decommissioned: 14 January 1955
- Reclassified: MSF-374, 7 February 1955
- Stricken: 1 December 1966
- Fate: Sold for scrap

General characteristics
- Class & type: Auk-class minesweeper
- Displacement: 890 long tons (904 t)
- Length: 221 ft 3 in (67.44 m)
- Beam: 32 ft (9.8 m)
- Draft: 10 ft 9 in (3.28 m)
- Speed: 18 knots (33 km/h; 21 mph)
- Complement: 100 officers and enlisted
- Armament: 1 × 3"/50 caliber gun; 2 × 40 mm guns; 2 × 20 mm guns; 2 × Depth charge tracks

USS Pigeon (AM-374) was an Auk-class minesweeper acquired by the United States Navy for the dangerous task of removing mines from minefields laid in the water to prevent ships from passing.

Pigeon was laid down 10 November 1944 by the Savannah Machine and Foundry Co., Savannah, Georgia; launched 28 March 1945; sponsored by Miss Jean Ross; and commissioned at Savannah on 30 October 1945.

== Decommissioned and reactivated ==
After fitting out at the Charleston Navy Yard and operations out of the Naval Mine Warfare School, Yorktown, Virginia, Pigeon was decommissioned on 10 July 1946. Following Communist aggression in Korea, she was recommissioned at Orange, Texas, on 30 November 1950.

== North Atlantic operations ==
Pigeon departed Orange, Texas, on 2 January 1951 to join Mine Squadron 8 at Charleston, South Carolina. Tactics and Atlantic Fleet exercises took her to Norfolk, Virginia, and to Cuba, Puerto Rico, and the Virgin Islands. On 25 August 1952 she departed Charleston, with Mine Division 82 for the North Atlantic Treaty Organization combined fleet exercise Operation Mainbrace. She arrived at Rosyth, Scotland on 11 September 1952 and put to sea the 19th to participate in "Mainbrace" minesweeping operations off Denmark.

Pigeon returned to Falmouth, England on 27 September 1952 and sailed the 29th with the same amphibious attack force for NATO "Operation Longstep" in the Mediterranean. These and other operations with the powerful U.S. 6th Fleet took her from ports of Morocco to ports in Italy, Turkey, Greece, France, and Spain. The minesweeper returned to Charleston, South Carolina, on 7 February 1953.

Overhauled in the Charleston Naval Shipyard, Pigeon resumed readiness and training operations along the eastern seaboard as far north as Quebec, Canada. She departed Charleston on 6 January 1954 and joined the 6th Fleet at Lisbon, Portugal, on 19 January 1954. After serving in fleet and NATO combined operations throughout the Mediterranean, she returned to Charleston on 29 May 1954.

== Decommissioning ==
Pigeon departed Charleston on 15 November to prepare for inactivation at Green Cove Springs, Florida. She decommissioned there 14 January 1955 and was placed in reserve. On 7 February 1955, she was reclassified a fleet minesweeper and redesignated MSF-374. She remained in reserve until her name was struck from the Navy List on 1 December 1966. She was sold for scrapping.
