= Frolick =

Frolick is a surname. Notable people with the surname include:

- Billy Frolick (born 1959), American writer and director
- Cedric Frolick (born 1967), South African politician

== See also ==
- Frolic (disambiguation)
- Frolík
