= N48 =

N48 may refer to:

== Vessels ==
- HNoMS Gor (N48), a minesweeper of the Royal Norwegian Navy
- HMS Medway Queen (N 48), a minesweeper of the Royal Navy
- HMS Traveller (N48), a T-class submarine of the Royal Navy sunk in 1942
- HMS Undine (N48), a U-class submarine of the Royal Navy scuttled in 1940

== Other uses ==
- N48 (Long Island bus)
- N48 motorway (Netherlands)
- Nagdlunguaq-48, a football and handball club in Greenland
