= Strenuous =

Strenuous may refer to:

- The Strenuous Life, a speech by Theodore Roosevelt
- HMS Strenuous (J338), a World War II era ship
- The strenuous grade of climbing
