= USS Sheldrake =

Minesweeper of the United States Navy

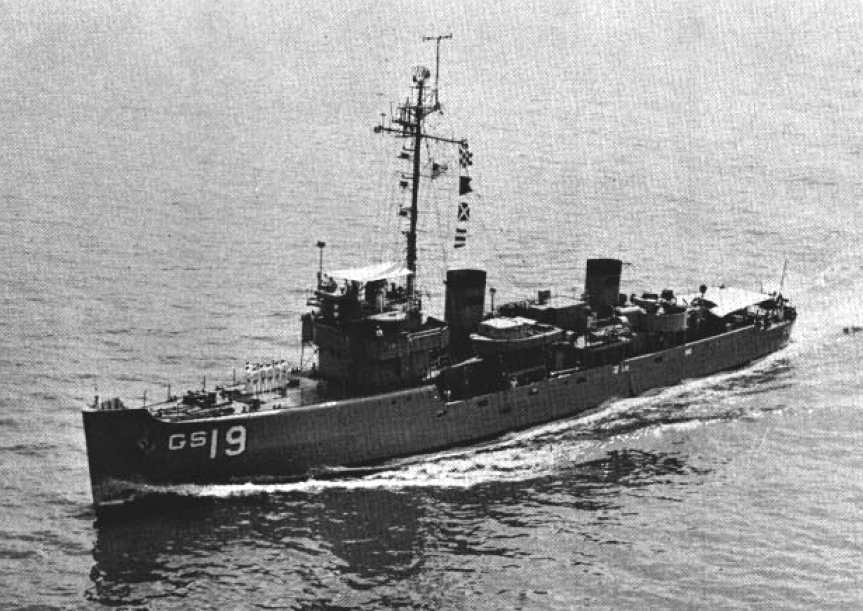
- USS Sheldrake (AGS-19) underway c1962

History

United States
- Name: USS Sheldrake (AM-62)
- Namesake: sheldrake duck
- Builder: General Engineering & Dry Dock Company, Alameda, California
- Laid down: 24 June 1941
- Launched: 12 February 1942
- Commissioned: 14 October 1942
- Decommissioned: 31 May 1946
- Reclassified: AGS-19
- Recommissioned: 14 April 1952
- Decommissioned: 1 August 1968
- Stricken: 30 June 1968
- Honours and awards: 4 battle stars (World War II)
- Fate: Sold for scrap, 2 November 1971

General characteristics
- Class & type: Auk-class minesweeper
- Displacement: 890 long tons (904 t)
- Length: 221 ft 3 in (67.44 m)
- Beam: 32 ft (9.8 m)
- Draft: 10 ft 9 in (3.28 m)
- Speed: 18 knots (33 km/h; 21 mph)
- Complement: 100 officers and enlisted
- Armament: 1 × 3"/50 caliber gun; 2 × 40 mm guns; 8 × 20 mm guns; 2 × Depth charge tracks

USS Sheldrake (AM-62/AGS-19) was an Auk-class minesweeper built for the United States Navy during World War II. The ship was named after the sheldrake duck. The ship earned four battle stars during World War II. She was converted to a survey ship and re-designated AGS-19 in 1952 and remained in commission until 1968. She was sold for scrap in 1971.

== Career ==
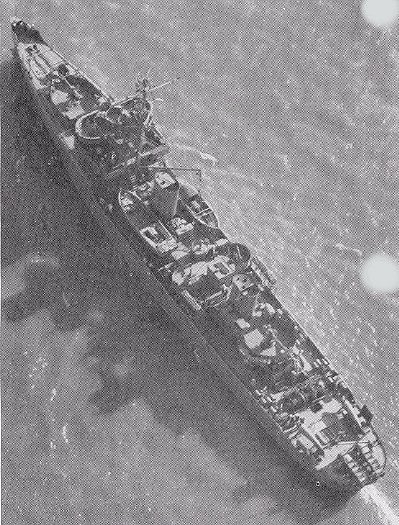
USS Sheldrake (AM-62) in 1942.

Sheldrake (AM-62) was laid down on 24 June 1941 by the General Engineering & Dry Dock Company of Alameda, California; launched on 12 February 1942; sponsored by Mrs. Helen Nicolini; and commissioned on 14 October 1942. After fitting out at Alameda, California, and making a short shakedown cruise in the San Francisco Bay area, Sheldrake departed to join a convoy bound for Pearl Harbor, Hawaii.

She arrived there on the first anniversary of the Japanese sneak attack and remained for three weeks. On 28 December, she got underway for Suva Island, Fiji, where she stopped from 7 to 12 January 1943, before heading on to the Allied base at Nouméa, New Caledonia. After a trip to Efate in the New Hebrides and back, from 17 to 27 January 1943, she departed Nouméa to join the escort of the first of many convoys, this one bound for Espiritu Santo. For the next 15 months, the auxiliary minesweeper criss-crossed the South Pacific shepherding convoys between bases in the New Hebrides, Solomon Islands. New Caledonia; also making-occasional runs to New Zealand, Samoa, and Fiji. Sheldrake also participated intermittently in patrols off Guadalcanal. From 2 Aug 1943 to 5 Nov 1943 Lt. Robert G. Nichols, USN, commanded the Sheldrake throughout the Pacific Area of Operation.

On 4 May 1944, she departed Espiritu Santo bound for Florida Island in the Solomons. She arrived off' Koli Point, Guadalcanal, two days later, then moved on to Purvis Bay, Florida Island. Her operations were centered in the Solomon Islands for the next month, after which, on 4 June, she departed the vicinity of Tassafaronga bound for Kwajalein and staging for the Marianas invasion.

Sheldrake arrived at Kwajalein on 8 June and departed four days later for the Saipan area. She cruised around in the waters near Saipan until 2 July, ready to reinforce the assault force if necessary. On that date, she departed the area for Eniwetok Atoll, where she remained from 13 to 17 July. The auxiliary minesweeper went from Eniwetok to Guam with Task Group 53.2. For the next two months, she stayed in the vicinity of Guam screening and engaging in hunter-killer antisubmarine operations, and putting in at Apra Harbor periodically for logistics. On 19 September. Sheldrake cleared the Marianas again on the first leg of a voyage to San Francisco, California. After stops at Eniwetok, 24 to 25 September, and at Pearl Harbor, 5 to 7 October, she entered San Francisco, California on 14 October. She shifted to the yards of the General Engineering and Dry Dock Co. on the next day and commenced a 14-week overhaul.

On 22 January 1945, Sheldrake departed San Francisco, California. After stops at San Pedro, California and San Diego, she got underway for Pearl Harbor on 1 February. She laid over at Pearl Harbor from 9 to 19 February and entered Eniwetok lagoon on the 27th. She stood but of the lagoon on the 28th to rejoin the fleet. However, a damaged port shaft in her engine caused her to proceed independently to Ulithi Atoll for repairs. She entered Ulithi Atoll on 6 March and went into drydock on the 14th. Sheldrake undocked two days later, but returned to drydock on the 21st. On 23 March, she undocked again and, on the 24th, got underway to escort survey ship, Bowditch to Okinawa.

Upon arrival at Okinawa, five days later, she and Bowditch separated and Sheldrake joined Sweep Unit 7. The sweep unit headed for Nago Wan, Okinawa, and arrived the next day. Sheldrake was detached soon thereafter to become a unit of Sweep Unit 6. From 1 to 25 April, she did screening duty with Sweep Unit 6. On the 16th, an enemy Val attempted to crash Sheldrake, but her gunners cut his suicide dive short 20 yards astern of Sheldrake. On 25 April, she escorted a convoy of LST's to Saipan, arriving on 1 May. From Saipan, she moved to Guam. She arrived on 5 May and, for the next two weeks, remained in that area, conducting sweep exercises, screening operations, and docking for six days, from 11 to 17 May.

On 23 June, she exited Apra Harbor and arrived at Nakagasuku Wan (Buckner Bay), Okinawa, late on 1 July. For the next two months, she swept mines in the vicinity of Okinawa, putting in periodically at Buckner Bay. She exited Buckner Bay on 5 September to join minesweeping operations off the Chinese coast in the area of the Yangtze River. She arrived there on the 7th and cleared mines until 23 September, when she moored at Shanghai. In October, she swept mines from Chefoo Harbor and in the area of Jinsen, Korea.

She returned to Shanghai on 16 October, swept mines there until 6 November, then headed for Takao, Formosa. Sheldrake's commanding officer directed minesweeping operations out of Takao until 21 December, and she reentered Shanghai on the 22d. On 3 January 1946, Sheldrake weighed anchor to return to the United States. On her way back, she stopped at Wakayama, Japan; Saipan; Eniwetok; and Pearl Harbor, before entering San Diego, California, on 1 March.

Decommissioned on 31 May 1946, Sheldrake joined the Pacific Reserve Fleet, berthed at San Diego, California. Sheldrake earned four battle stars for World War II.

== Survey ship ==
Sheldrake recommissioned at San Diego, California, on 14 April 1952 and sailed to New York City for conversion to an oceanographic survey ship with hull symbol AGS-19. Over the next 16 years, she plied the waters of the western Atlantic and the Caribbean, from Newfoundland to Cuba, conducting over 25 separate surveys. On three occasions, Sheldrake left her normal area of operations to conduct surveys. Two of these cruises were to the Mediterranean, February to April 1958 and November 1965 to March 1966. The third departure from normal Atlantic Ocean operations came in July 1966 when she changed homeports, from New York City to Pearl Harbor, Hawaii.

Departing Bayonne, New Jersey, on 7 July, she laid over at Norfolk, Virginia, until 12 July; then got underway with Towhee for the Panama Canal. They transited the canal on the 19th, visited Mazatlán, Mexico, on the 29th, and arrived at Pearl Harbor on 12 August. After almost three months in Hawaii, Sheldrake deployed to the western Pacific on 9 November. For almost a year and one-half, she, Tanner and Towhee surveyed in the western Pacific, in the Philippines, and along the Southeast Asian coast. On 9 April, she returned to Pearl Harbor.

She remained in Hawaii until struck from the Navy List on 30 June 1968 and decommissioned on 1 August. She was turned over to the Inactive Ship Maintenance Facility at Pearl Harbor until sold to Flynn-Learner of Honolulu on 2 November 1971 for scrapping.
