= USS Staff =

Minesweeper of the United States Navy

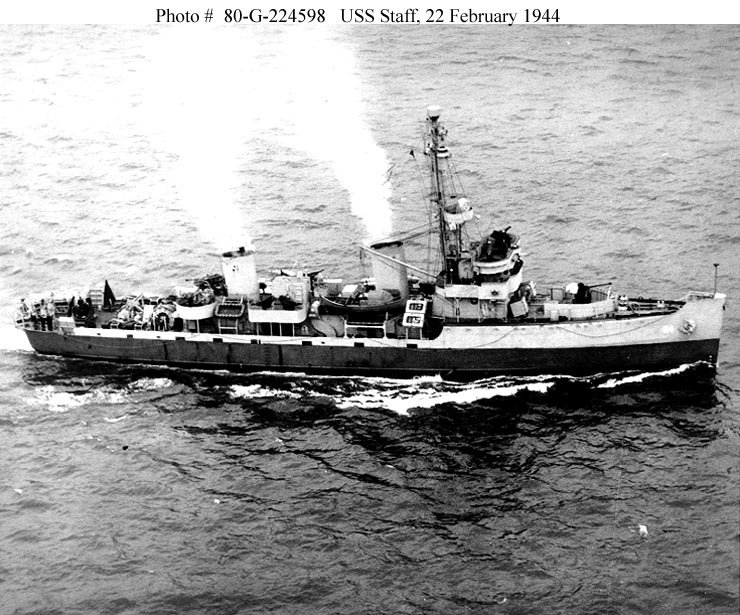

History

United States
- Name: USS Staff
- Builder: American Ship Building Company, Cleveland, Ohio
- Laid down: 28 November 1941
- Launched: 17 June 1942
- Commissioned: 11 November 1942
- Decommissioned: 15 January 1947
- Recommissioned: 14 January 1952
- Decommissioned: 15 August 1955
- Reclassified: MSF-114, 7 February 1955
- Stricken: 1 March 1967
- Honours and awards: 6 battle stars (World War II)
- Fate: Sold for scrap, 17 November 1967

General characteristics
- Class & type: Auk-class minesweeper
- Displacement: 890 long tons (904 t)
- Length: 221 ft 3 in (67.44 m)
- Beam: 32 ft (9.8 m)
- Draft: 10 ft 9 in (3.28 m)
- Speed: 18 knots (33 km/h; 21 mph)
- Complement: 105 officers and enlisted
- Armament: 1 × 3"/50 caliber gun; 2 × 40 mm guns

USS Staff (AM-114) was an Auk-class minesweeper acquired by the United States Navy for the dangerous task of removing mines from minefields laid in the water to prevent ships from passing.

Staff was laid down on 28 November 1941 by the American Ship Building Company at Cleveland, Ohio; launched on 17 June 1942; and commissioned on Veterans Day (11 November) 1942.

== North African operations ==
She completed fitting out at the Boston Navy Yard on 9 January 1943 and reported for shakedown a few days later. In late March, she sailed in the screen of convoy UGS-6 bound for North Africa. The convoy arrived at Mers El Kébir on 13 April, and Staff remained there until the 20th. She joined other minesweepers in conducting antisubmarine patrols off the Gulf of Arzeu until the end of May. During the first three weeks in June, Staff swept mines off the Gulf of Oran, returning to the Mers El Kébir anchorage each night.

== Vessel strikes a mine ==
Between 24 June and 1 July, she divided her time between patrols, exercises, and mine sweeps; then joined Task Force 85 at anchor in Mers El Kébir. On the 5th, the task force sortied and headed for Sicily. Staff sailed in the screen and arrived off the Sicilian coast on 9 July. During the invasion, the minesweeper was assigned patrol duties off Scoglitti. She patrolled, sank mines, and duelled with shore batteries between 9 and 16 July. On the 16th, during an engagement with shore batteries, Staff struck a mine and sustained extensive damage in the forward engine room and suffered a number of casualties. She entered Licata on the 17th and remained there until 8 August when Hopi got underway with the minesweeper in tow. The two ships reached Bizerte, Tunisia, on the 10th and Oran, Algeria, on the 16th.

== Stateside repairs ==
Staff was docked at Oran on 31 August and was refloated on 23 September. On 18 October, SS Moose Peak towed her out of Oran, and they joined GUS-18 for the voyage to the United States. She made Norfolk, Virginia, on 6 November and was soon docked again for battle repairs.

== Invasion of France ==
On 25 March 1944 she sailed from New York to Plymouth, England, for temporary duty with the U.S. 12th Fleet, supporting the invasion of Normandy. That assignment lasted from 15 April to 1 August. The Staff was the leading minesweeper of the minesweeping group that led the invasion.

On 8 June 1944 off Utah Beach, Staff came to the assistance of the destroyer Glennon (DD-620)**, which had struck a mine, and grounded. Unable to tow the Glennon, it took on board most of its crew, many of whom were injured some seriously. For this operation its captain, Lieutenant J.H.NAPIER was awarded Bronze Star Metal*. During efforts to refloat the stricken ship, the destroyer escort Rich (DE-695) also struck a mine which blew off a 50-foot section of her stern, followed by mine explosion under her forecastle. Rich sank within 15 minutes, and Glennon was eventually abandoned.

- "For meritorious performance of duty as Commanding Officer of the U.S.S. STAFF during the assault of France, 8 June 1944. Lieutenant Napier took his ship alongside the mined U.S.S. GLENNON, tried to tow her to a safe position, but finding this impossible, took off the stricken vessel all the personnel he could safely carry. The prompt and decisive action of Lieutenant Napier contributed in large measure to keeping the loss of life to a minimum. His actions were in keeping with the best traditions of the United States naval service." Signed by Harold R. Stark, Admiral, U.S.Navy, Commander U.S.Naval Forces in Europe.

From the record of the USS Glennon (DD-620), after Staff left with as much of the crew it could carry, Gleenon was hit by shore batteries and 25 of its crew were killed.

== Renewed Mediterranean operations ==
Prom there, she moved to the Mediterranean for another temporary duty assignment, this time with the U.S. 6th Fleet. She was at Oran from 6 to 10 August and, by 15 August, was off the Mediterranean coast of France for the invasion there. She supported the invasion until mid-November, then returned to Oran. From there, she headed back to the United States on 24 November. She reached Norfolk, Virginia, on 11 December and did not leave until 15 February 1945, when she sailed south to Panama. Staff transited the canal 10 days later and arrived in Pearl Harbor on 19 March. She remained at Pearl Harbor until 9 May, first in overhaul, then conducting exercises with submarines off Oahu.

== Pacific Ocean Theatre operations ==
On 9 May, she got underway in the screen of a westward-bound convoy. The ships reached Eniwetok on 18 May; and, two days later, Staff sailed for the Marianas with Tumult and SC-727. They entered Apra Harbor, Guam, on the 22nd. Almost a week later, on the 28th, she got underway for Okinawa. The minesweeper escorted a convoy of LST's to Nakagusuku Wan (Buckner Bay), Okinawa, then put into Kerama Retto on 6 June. For the remainder of the month, Staff operated out of the anchorage at Kerama Retto, patrolling and screening around Okinawa. She cleared the area on 30 June and returned to Guam the following day. She remained in the Marianas, visiting both Guam and Saipan, until 2 August. She arrived off Okinawa again on 7 August and took part in Operation Skagway, a minesweeping operation in the East China Sea, from 13 to 25 August.

On the 25th, Staff returned to Buckner Bay and, on 1 September, sailed in company with six other mine-craft and four smaller vessels to conduct the initial sweep of the Kyūshū approaches. On the 9th, she departed Japan for Okinawa and reentered Buckner Bay on the 11th. Staff stood out again on 21 September and headed for Bungo Suido to conduct further sweeps in the Japanese home islands, this time in the waters between Kyūshū and Shikoku. She continued minesweeping operations through the fall and into winter.

== Post-World War II operations ==
In late December, she visited Shanghai; then headed for the United States. She stopped at Pearl Harbor early in February 1946 and reached San Pedro, Los Angeles, on the 14th. There, she reported to the 19th Fleet and began inactivation overhaul at Terminal Island, California.

== First Decommissioning ==
Staff was retained in commission, in reserve, until 15 January 1947, when she was decommissioned and berthed at San Diego.

== Reactivation ==
On 14 January 1952, Staff was recommissioned at San Diego, California and sailed – via Acapulco, Mexico, the Panama Canal, and Guantanamo Bay – to Charleston, South Carolina, and Norfolk, Virginia. She was assigned to Mine Squadron 6 and operated along the U.S. East Coast until 26 August when she sailed for Scotland. Staff visited Holyhead and the Firth of Forth in September and returned to Charleston, South Carolina, on 12 October. She resumed operations along the eastern seaboard during the winter of 1952 and 1953; then, on 21 April 1953, put to sea to join the U.S. 6th Fleet in the Mediterranean. Staff cruised with the U.S. 6th Fleet until October, visiting most of the major ports on the Mediterranean. She reentered Charleston on 26 October, and she was moored until the new year.

On 4 January 1954, she embarked on a cruise to the Gulf of Mexico, the Caribbean Sea, and the British West Indies. She returned to Charleston on 2 April and operated from there until September. Staff rejoined the 6th Fleet in mid-September and cruised the "middle sea" until January 1955. The minesweeper returned to Charleston on 29 January.

== Decommissioning ==
On 7 February, she was redesignated MSF-114; and, on 28 March, she reported to the Atlantic Reserve Fleet for inactivation. She was placed out of commission, in reserve, at Green Cove Springs, Florida, on 15 August 1955. Her name was struck from the Navy List on 1 March 1967 and her hulk sold to Southern Scrap Metals Co. of New Orleans, Louisiana, on 17 November 1967.

== Awards ==
Staff was awarded six battle stars during World War II.
