= Frolic =

Frolic may refer to:

== Maritime ==
- HMS Frolic, one of several ships of the British Royal Navy
- USS Frolic, one of several ships of the United States Navy
- Frolic (brig), a historic shipwreck off the coast of California
- Frolic, a trimaran designed by Arthur Piver

== Music ==
- Frolic (album), by Anneli Drecker, 2005
- "Frolic", the opening theme of the HBO show Curb Your Enthusiasm

== Other uses ==
- Frolic (law), a concept in tort law
- George Alexis Weymouth (1936–2016), or Frolic Weymouth, American artist and conservationist
- A type of festive occasion in 19th century Norfolk, UK, as depicted in Thorpe Water Frolic, Afternoon by Joseph Stannard
