= USS Peregrine =

Minesweeper of the United States Navy

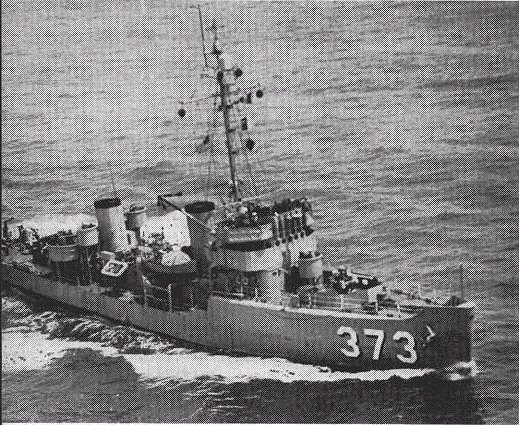

History

United States
- Name: USS Peregrine
- Builder: Savannah Machine and Foundry Co., Savannah, Georgia
- Laid down: 24 October 1944
- Launched: 17 February 1945
- Commissioned: 27 September 1945
- Decommissioned: 31 January 1969
- Reclassified: MSF-373, 7 February 1955; EMSF-373, date unknown; AG-176, 25 February 1964
- Stricken: 1 February 1969

General characteristics
- Class & type: Auk-class minesweeper
- Displacement: 890 long tons (904 t)
- Length: 221 ft 3 in (67.44 m)
- Beam: 32 ft (9.8 m)
- Draft: 10 ft 9 in (3.28 m)
- Speed: 18 knots (33 km/h; 21 mph)
- Complement: 100 officers and enlisted
- Armament: 1 × 3"/50 caliber gun; 2 × 40 mm guns; 2 × 20 mm guns; 2 × Depth charge tracks

USS Peregrine (AM-373) was an Auk-class minesweeper built for the United States Navy for the dangerous task of removing mines from minefields laid in the water to prevent ships from passing. She was named after the peregrine, a swift and powerful falcon.

Peregrine was laid down by the Savannah Machine & Foundry Co., Savannah, Georgia, 24 October 1944; launched 17 February 1945; sponsored by Mrs. Ethel K. Adams; and commissioned 27 September 1945.

== East Coast operations ==
After fitting out at the Charleston Navy Yard, Charleston, South Carolina, and shakedown in Chesapeake Bay, Peregrine became a school ship at the Naval Mine Warfare School, Yorktown, Virginia.

From 1945 to 1951 she conducted daily minesweeping operations in Yorktown, Virginia; Charleston, South Carolina; and Norfolk, Virginia, and also conducted tests on anti-roll gear, and other tests of an experimental nature.

Peregrine spent most of the years from 1951 to 1955 operating out of Norfolk with cruises as far south as Balboa, Panama Canal Zone and as far north as Naval Station Argentia, Newfoundland. On 7 February 1955 she became MSF-373. On 9 September 1955 she departed Key West, Florida, for Port Lyautey, North Africa. She operated off Casablanca and called at Gibraltar before sailing for Bermuda and Key West, Florida, arriving at that homeport 8 December.

From 1955 to 1960 Peregrine operated out of Key West, Florida, as far south as Guantanamo Bay, Cuba, and Ciudad Trujillo, Dominican Republic, and as far north as New York City. On 24 June Peregrine departed for special operations near Saint John's harbor, New Brunswick, Canada.

Peregrine departed the Key West, Florida, area again 31 July 1961 en route to Argentia returning 5 October. During November 1962, while serving under ComServLant, Peregrine escorted the technical research ship Oxford (AG-159) on patrol off Havana, Cuba, during the Cuban Missile Crisis.

During 1963 Peregrine was involved in a mapping project from Bermuda to Argentia and Halifax, Nova Scotia, during which time she did not see her homeport for five months.

== Reclassification to Type AG ==
On 25 February 1964 the ship's designation was changed from Experimental Fleet Mine Sweeper (EMSF-373) to general auxiliary (AG-176). Her new designator reflected her operational task of full-time testing and evaluating of experimental equipment prior to incorporation of the equipment into other ships of the fleet.

== Arctic operations ==
In February 1965 Peregrine departed Key West, Florida, for a South Atlantic Ocean cruise to conduct independent project operations. After a return to Key West, Peregrine entered Rosyth, Scotland, 20 May. On 27 May Peregrine gained her "Blue Nose" as she crossed the Arctic Circle. For most of the rest of the year Peregrine participated in classified oceanographic operations in the Norwegian Sea. She visited Bremerhaven, Germany, 21–25 October, returning to Key West, Florida, 10 November.

In early 1966 Peregrine participated in the testing of an experimental oceanographic survey method in Bermuda operating areas. In late 1966 Peregrine was deployed to the North Atlantic Ocean on special operations, operating out of Naval Station Argentia, Newfoundland.

On 1 March 1967 Peregrine got underway from Key West, Florida, for the Panama Canal which she transited 5–6 March, reaching her new homeport of San Francisco, California, 16 March. She departed San Francisco 25 March, reaching Pearl Harbor 1 April. She departed 4 April for Yokosuka, Japan, where she conducted project operations. September and October were spent conducting operations out of Midway. After further operations out of Hawaii, the ship returned to San Francisco, California 28 November.

== Decommissioning ==
Peregrine was decommissioned 31 January 1969. She was struck from the Navy List on 1 February 1969.
