= USS Steady =

Minesweeper of the United States Navy

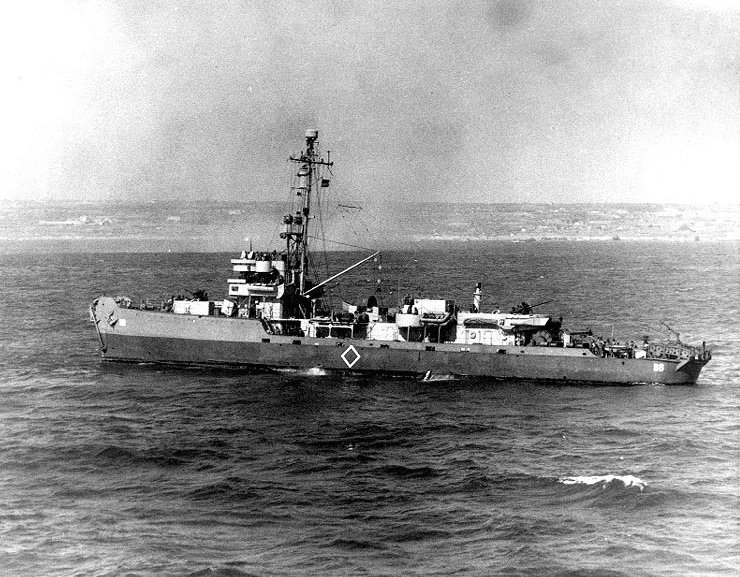

History

United States
- Name: USS Steady (AM-118)
- Builder: American Ship Building Company, Cleveland, Ohio
- Laid down: 17 November 1941
- Launched: 6 June 1942
- Commissioned: 16 November 1942
- Decommissioned: 18 June 1946
- Reclassified: MSF-118, 7 February 1955
- Honors and awards: 8 battle stars (World War II)
- Fate: Sold to the Republic of China, 15 August 1967
- Stricken: 1 February 1968

History

Taiwan
- Name: ROCS Ping Jing (PCE-70) (平靖)
- Acquired: 15 August 1967
- Stricken: 16 January 1998

General characteristics
- Class & type: Auk-class minesweeper
- Displacement: 890 long tons (904 t)
- Length: 221 ft 3 in (67.44 m)
- Beam: 32 ft (9.8 m)
- Draft: 10 ft 9 in (3.28 m)
- Speed: 18 knots (33 km/h; 21 mph)
- Complement: 105 officers and enlisted
- Armament: 1 × 3"/50 caliber gun; 2 × 40 mm guns

USS Steady (AM-118) was an Auk-class minesweeper acquired by the United States Navy for the dangerous task of removing mines from minefields laid in the water to prevent ships from passing.

Steady was laid down on 17 November 1941 by the American Ship Building Company, Cleveland, Ohio launched on 6 June 1942; sponsored by Mrs. R. P. Schlabach Jr.; and commissioned on 16 November 1942.

Steady sailed down the Saint Lawrence River, and stopped at Boston before proceeding to Norfolk, her home port. After completion of fitting-out and a shakedown cruise, she got under way for North Africa and arrived at Mers El Kébir, Algeria, on 13 April 1943. She operated in Algerian waters until 1 July when she joined a convoy heading, via Bizerte, Tunisia, for Sicily.

== World War II North African operations ==
Steady arrived off Gela on 9 July and began sweeping operations ahead of the invasion fleet which landed troops there on the next day. She swept mines and patrolled off Gela, Licata, and Palermo until sailing for Bizerte on 1 August. She picked up a resupply convoy there and, with other ships of Mine Squadron 6, escorted it to Palermo where she swept and patrolled until 23 August when she returned to Algeria.

Steady sailed on 5 September with a convoy for the Gulf of Salerno. She began minesweeping and patrolling operations, on the 8th, to clear the area for the landing of the Allied 5th Army on 9 September. The American ships were under heavy air attack on the 11th, but Steady suffered no damage and continued operating there until departing for Bizerte on the 20th. Until 9 November, she escorted convoys from North African ports to Italy. From 10 December 1943 to 2 January 1944, the ship was overhauled at Bizerte.

== Italian Area operations ==
Steady escorted a convoy to Italy in early January and arrived at Naples on the 7th. She stood out of that port on the 21st with a convoy assigned to Operation Shingle, the landing of American and British forces behind German lines in the Anzio-Nettuno area of Italy. Steady arrived in the assault area on the morning of the 22d (D-Day) to begin minesweeping and patrolling to protect Allied ships from German submarines and "E" boats. She continued this duty until the 30th when she sailed for Naples as a convoy escort. From 31 January to 13 August, the minesweeper shuttled between North Africa, Malta, Italy, and Corsica with convoys. She also operated off Anzio again in April and June and off Salerno in July and August.

Steady sailed from Corsica, on 14 August, with a convoy of LCI's destined to participate in the invasion of southern France. She screened the transports and cargo ships on their way to St. Raphael. After the initial assault, Steady then swept mines and patrolled off southern France until 27 September when she sailed for Corsica. She escorted convoys from Corsica and North Africa to France until 24 November when she sailed for the United States.

== Stateside overhaul ==
Steady arrived at Hampton Roads, Virginia, on 11 December 1944 and entered the Norfolk Navy Yard for an overhaul. On 15 February 1945, the minesweeper got underway with MinRon 6 and headed for the Pacific She transited the Panama Canal on 25 February; remained at Pearl Harbor from 18 March to 25 April; and, after port calls at Eniwetok, Guam, and Saipan, arrived at Kerama Retto on 30 May.

== World War II Pacific operations ==
The ship operated in the Okinawa area until September. Steady performed antisubmarine duty as well as sweeping mines. On 21 June, she rescued 38 survivors from LSM-59, hit by a kamikaze.

In August, after the hostilities had ceased, she swept mines in the East China Sea. She steamed to Kyūshū, Japan, in early September and swept mines in Bungo Suido, Kagoshima, and Van Diemen Strait. In November, she helped clear waters of the East China Sea off Formosa. Steady called at Shanghai on 22 December and then began her long voyage home for inactivation.

== Decommissioning ==
After returning via Eniwetok and Pearl Harbor, she arrived at San Pedro, California, on 14 February 1946 and then moved down the coast to San Diego for pre-inactivation overhaul. The minesweeper was placed out of commission, in reserve, on 18 June 1946 and attached to the Pacific Reserve Fleet. On 7 February 1955, her classification was changed from AM-118 to MSF-118. Steady was sold to Taiwan on 15 August 1967, and served that government as Ping Jing (PCE-70). She was struck from the Navy List on 1 February 1968.

== Awards ==
Steady received eight battle stars for World War II service.
