= USS Minivet (AM-371) =

Minesweeper of the United States Navy

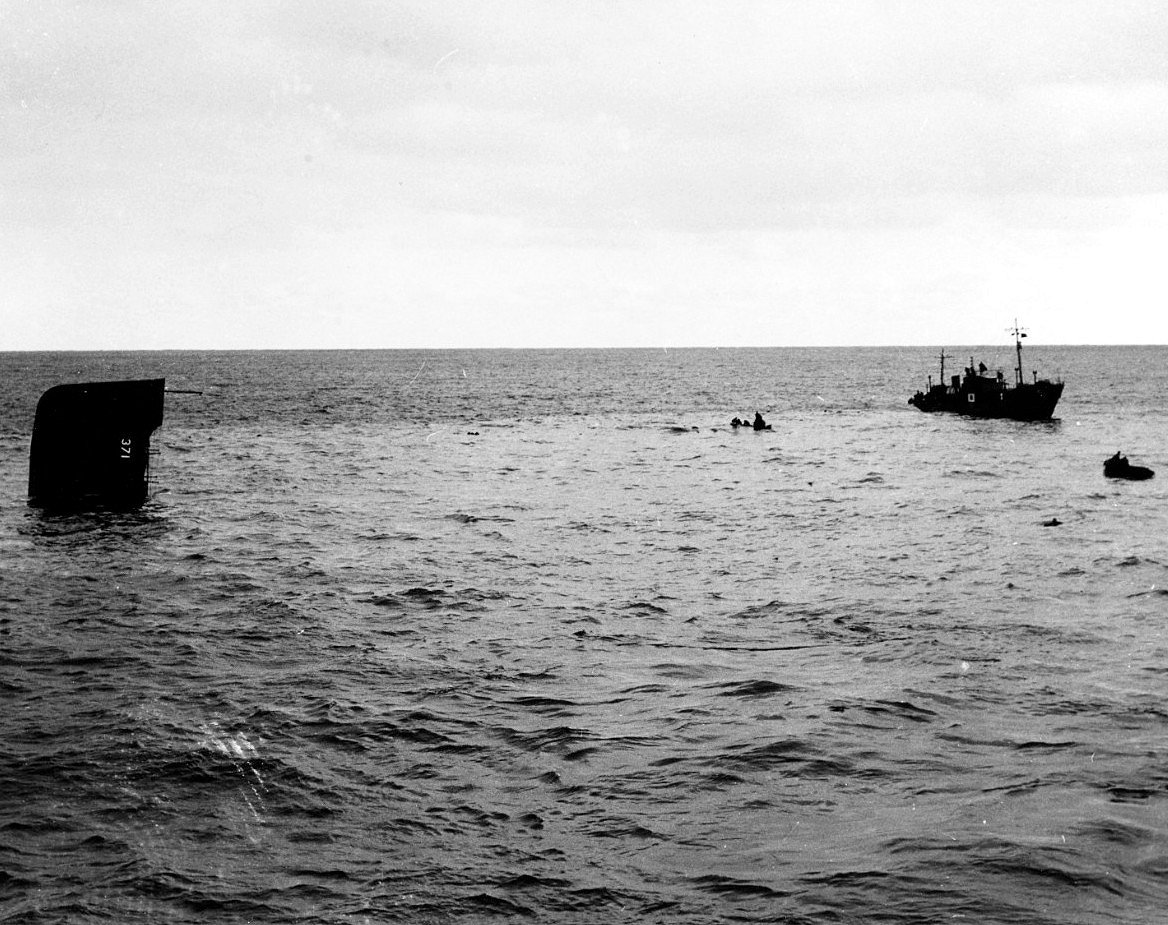
- Minivet sinking on 29 December 1945

History

United States
- Name: USS Minivet
- Builder: Savannah Machine & Foundry Co., Savannah, Georgia
- Laid down: 19 July 1944
- Launched: 8 November 1944
- Commissioned: 29 May 1945
- Stricken: 21 January 1946
- Honours and awards: 1 battle star (World War II)
- Fate: Sunk by mine, 29 December 1945

General characteristics
- Class & type: Auk-class minesweeper
- Displacement: 890 long tons (904 t)
- Length: 221 ft 3 in (67.44 m)
- Beam: 32 ft (9.8 m)
- Draft: 10 ft 9 in (3.28 m)
- Speed: 18 knots (33 km/h; 21 mph)
- Complement: 100 officers and enlisted
- Armament: 1 × 3"/50 caliber gun; 2 × 40 mm guns; 2 × 20 mm guns; 2 × Depth charge tracks

USS Minivet (AM-371) was an Auk-class minesweeper acquired by the United States Navy for the dangerous task of removing mines from minefields laid in the water to prevent ships from passing.

Minivet was named after the minivet, a type of cuckoo shrike of Asiatic origin.

Minivet was laid down 19 July 1944 by Savannah Machine & Foundry Co., Savannah, Georgia: launched 8 November 1944; sponsored by Miss Henrietta G. Jerrell; commissioned 29 May 1945.

== Assignment to Pacific operations ==
Minivet concluded shakedown training at Little Creek, Virginia, and on 22 August 1945 steamed out of Norfolk, Virginia, en route to assignment in the Far East. She arrived Sasebo, Japan 30 October with Mine Division 23 to play her part in opening the sealanes to peacetime commerce.

== Sinking in the Tsushima Straits ==
During her first month in the area, escort trips to Pusan, Korea, and from Okinawa left little time to stream her minesweeping gear. After a brief availability period AM-371 departed Sasebo on 23 December 1945 in company with eight Japanese vessels to complete the sweeping of the Tsushima Straits. Following in the wake of the second pass of the day on 29 December she struck a mine and in a matter of minutes rolled over and sank. Despite the discipline and courageous action of her crew and the bravery of American and Japanese rescuers, Minivet suffered 31 men killed or missing. She became the first American minesweeper lost during these hazardous operations that had destroyed 20,000 mines since the end of the war.

== Removal from Navy List ==
Her name was stricken from the Navy list on 21 January 1946 after her logbook and the last survivors had returned to the United States.

== Awards ==
Minivet (AM-371) received one battle star for her service in the aftermath of World War II.
