= Frolík =

Frolík (feminine: Frolíková) is a Czech surname. Notable people with the surname include:

- Josef Frolík (1928–1989), Czechoslovak spy
- Michael Frolík (born 1988), Czech ice hockey player
- Zbyněk Frolík (born 1953), Czech entrepreneur
- Zdeněk Frolík (1933–1989), Czech mathematician

== See also ==
- Frolick
