= HMS Tourmaline (J339) =

Minesweeper of the Royal Navy

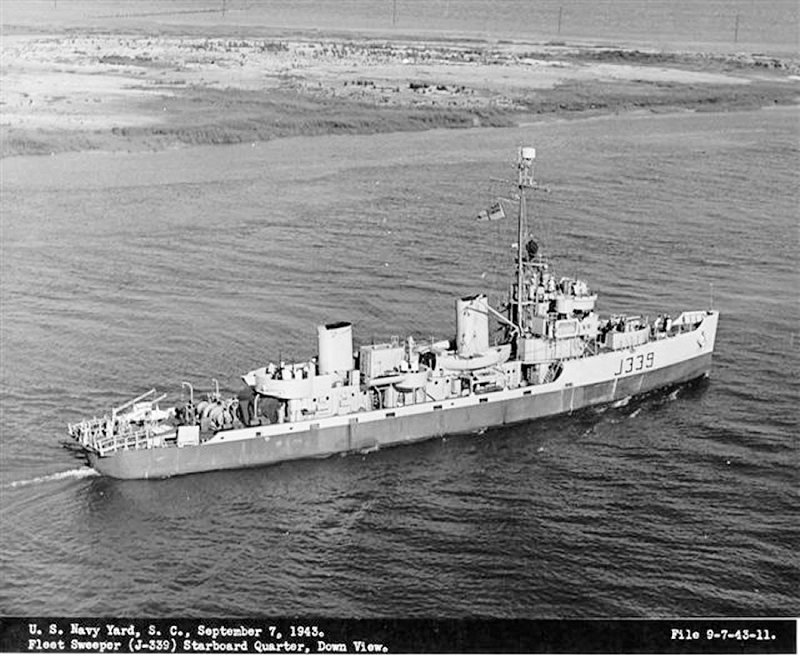

History

United Kingdom
- Name: HMS Tourmaline (J339)
- Builder: Gulf Shipbuilding Corporation, Chickasaw, Alabama
- Laid down: 1 January 1942, as Usage (AM-130)
- Launched: 4 October 1942
- Completed: 7 June 1943, and transferred to the UK under Lend-Lease
- Fate: Returned to the US, January 1947; Transferred to the Foreign Liquidation Commission and sold to Turkey

History

Turkey
- Name: TCG Çardak (M507)
- Decommissioned: 1974
- Fate: Unknown

General characteristics
- Class & type: Catherine-class minesweeper
- Displacement: 890 long tons (904 t)
- Length: 221 ft 3 in (67.44 m)
- Beam: 32 ft (9.8 m)
- Draught: 10 ft 9 in (3.28 m)
- Speed: 18 knots (33 km/h; 21 mph)
- Complement: 100
- Armament: 1 × 3"/50 caliber gun; 2 × 40 mm guns; 2 × 20 mm guns; 2 × Depth charge tracks

HMS Tourmaline (J339) was a Catherine-class minesweeper of the Royal Navy during the Second World War. Originally planned as USS Usage (AM-130), of the United States Navy's Auk class, she was transferred to the United Kingdom under Lend-Lease.

== Career ==
Usage was laid down on 1 January 1942 at Chickasaw, Alabama, by the Gulf Shipbuilding Corp.; launched on 4 October 1942; and transferred to the United Kingdom under lend-lease on 7 June 1943.

Usage served with the Royal Navy as HMS Tourmaline (J339) in the Atlantic Ocean in World War II. She was returned to United States custody in January 1947, struck from the Navy list, and transferred to the Foreign Liquidation Commission for disposition. Sold to Turkey, she served with the Turkish Navy under the name Çardak until 1974.
