= USS Wheatear =

Minesweeper of the United States Navy

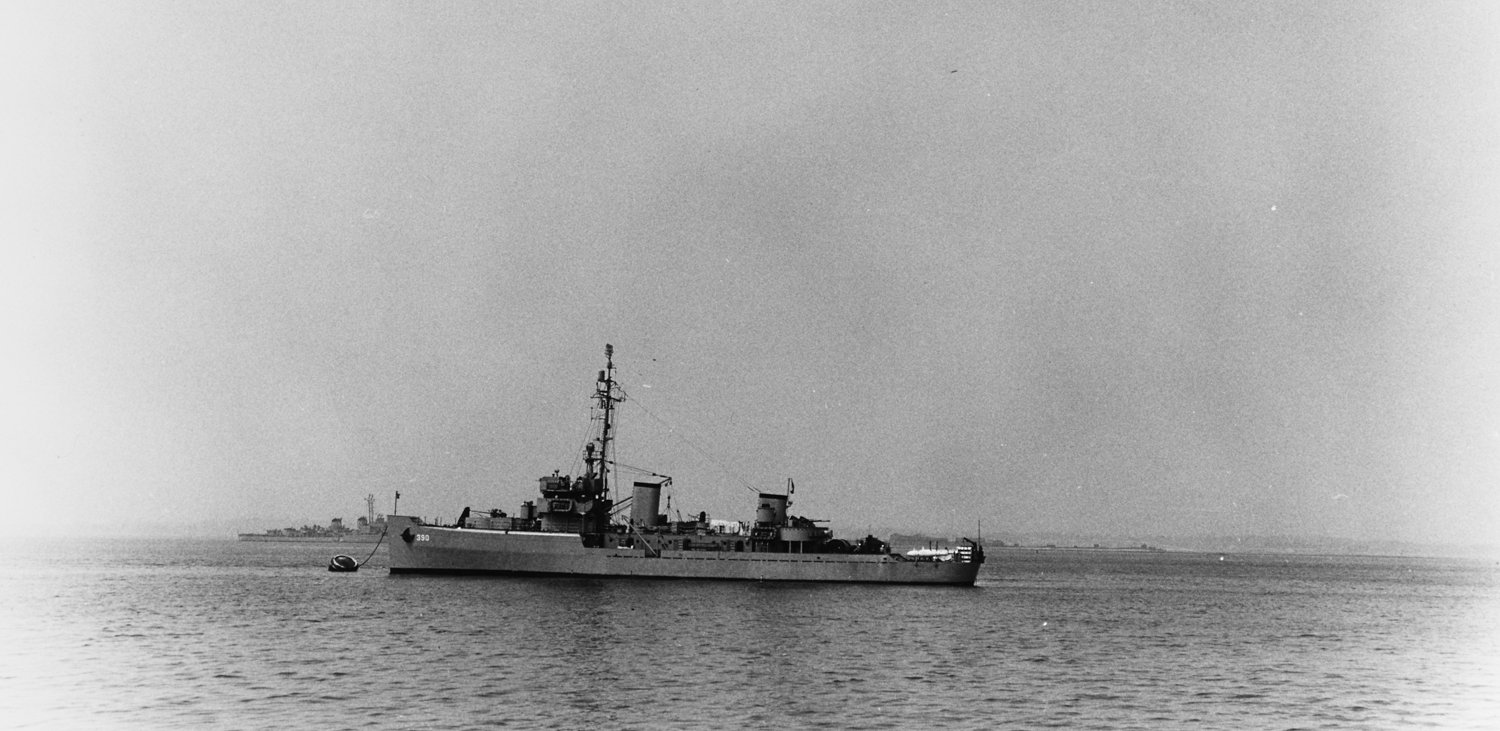
- Wheatear off Newport Rhode Island in August 1947

History

United States
- Name: USS Wheatear
- Laid down: 29 May 1944
- Launched: 21 April 1945
- Commissioned: 3 October 1945
- Decommissioned: 17 November 1954
- Reclassified: MSF-390, 7 February 1955
- Stricken: 1 July 1972
- Fate: Sold for scrapping, 20 December 1973

General characteristics
- Class & type: Auk-class minesweeper
- Displacement: 890 long tons (904 t)
- Length: 221 ft 3 in (67.44 m)
- Beam: 32 ft (9.8 m)
- Draft: 10 ft 9 in (3.28 m)
- Speed: 18 knots (33 km/h; 21 mph)
- Complement: 100 officers and enlisted
- Armament: 1 × 3"/50 caliber gun; 2 × 40 mm guns; 2 × 20 mm guns; 2 × Depth charge tracks

USS Wheatear (AM-390) was an Auk-class minesweeper acquired by the United States Navy for the dangerous task of removing mines from minefields laid in the water to prevent ships from passing.

Wheatear was named after the wheatears, a small northern bird related to the stonechats and whinchat.

Wheatear was laid down on 29 May 1944 at Cleveland, Ohio, by the American Ship Building Company; launched on 21 April 1945; sponsored by Mrs. H. P. Isham; and commissioned on 3 October 1945.

== East Coast operations ==
Wheatear departed Cleveland, Ohio on 8 October and arrived in Boston on the 20th. There, she completed the fitting-out process and its attendant exercises. On 23 November, she got underway and headed south, arriving at Little Creek, Virginia, on the 27th. She began shakedown training which lasted until 14 January 1946 when she became an active unit of Mine Division (MinDiv) 10. Following post-shakedown availability, Wheatear began training operations in the Chesapeake Bay from her base in Norfolk, Virginia. That employment continued until 24 June when she received orders to proceed to Charleston, South Carolina, where she went into an inactive status due to a severe shortage of crew members. She continued in that status until 31 October.

== Return to East Coast operations ==
On 1 November, she returned to sea for a training cruise to the Panama Canal, during which voyage she also visited Orange, Texas, and Miami, Florida. For almost two years, the minesweeper operated out of Charleston as a unit of the Atlantic Fleet Mine Force.

In August 1948, she was reassigned to the Operational Development Force, based at Panama City, Florida. For almost five years, she supported the force's developmental work. Based at Panama City, she cruised the waters of the Gulf of Mexico and in the West Indies, operating frequently in the Guantanamo Bay operating area and infrequently making cruises along the Atlantic seaboard as far north as Naval Station Argentia, Newfoundland.

On 15 April 1953, Wheatear rejoined the active Mine Force at Charleston as a unit of MinDiv 81; however, less than a month later on 1 May, she transferred to MinDiv 85. For the remainder of her brief career, the warship operated along the Atlantic coast and in the West Indies carrying out training missions with the Atlantic Fleet. The only exception to that routine came on 19 September 1953 when she departed Charleston on her only deployment.

== Mediterranean operations ==
She served with the U.S. 6th Fleet in the Mediterranean until January 1954 when she headed home. The minesweeper arrived at Charleston on 5 February 1954 and resumed her duties with the Mine Force.

== Decommissioning ==
In June, she began preparations for inactivation. On 17 November 1954, Wheatear was decommissioned at Orange, Texas, and berthed with the Orange Group, Atlantic Reserve Fleet. On 7 February 1955, she was redesignated MSF-390. The warship remained in reserve at Orange until 1 July 1972 at which time her name was struck from the Navy list. On 20 December 1973, she was sold to the Southern Scrap Material Co., Ltd., of New Orleans, Louisiana, for scrapping.
