= USS Nuthatch =

Minesweeper of the United States Navy

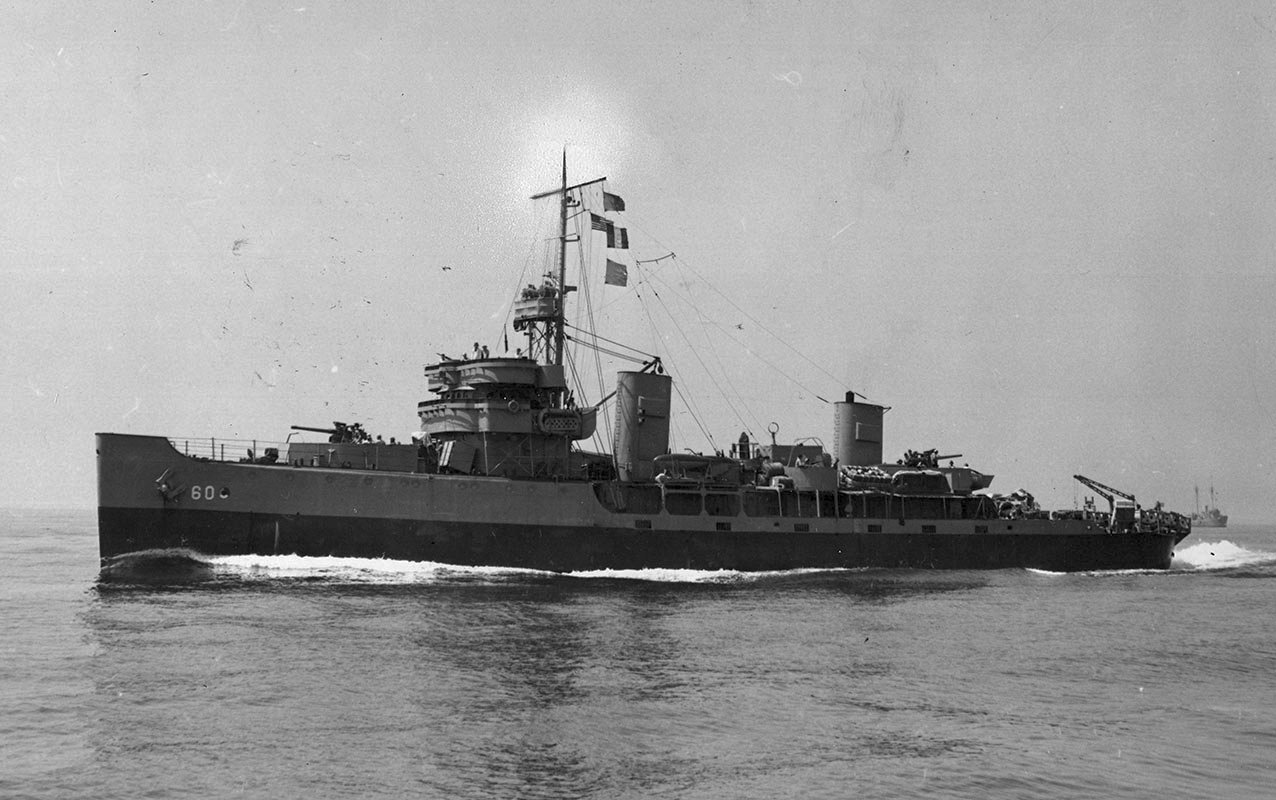
- Nuthatch on 10 November 1943 as she provided escort to SS Santa Marta to Norfolk, Virginia

History

United States
- Name: USS Nuthatch
- Builder: Defoe Shipbuilding Company, Bay City, Michigan
- Laid down: 22 May 1942
- Launched: 16 September 1942
- Commissioned: 19 November 1943
- Decommissioned: 3 June 1946
- Reclassified: MSF-60, 7 February 1965
- Stricken: 1 December 1966
- Honours and awards: 2 battle stars (World War II)
- Fate: Sunk as target ship

General characteristics
- Class & type: Auk-class minesweeper
- Displacement: 890 long tons (904 t)
- Length: 221 ft 3 in (67.44 m)
- Beam: 32 ft (9.8 m)
- Draft: 10 ft 9 in (3.28 m)
- Speed: 18 knots (33 km/h; 21 mph)
- Complement: 100 officers and enlisted
- Armament: 1 × 3-inch/50-caliber gun; 2 × 40 mm guns; 2 × 20 mm guns; 2 × Depth charge tracks

USS Nuthatch (AM-60) was an Auk-class minesweeper in the United States Navy.

Nuthatch was laid down at the Defoe Shipbuilding Company in Bay City, Michigan on 22 May 1942. She was launched on 16 September 1942, sponsored by Mrs. Charles D. Swain, and commissioned on 19 November 1942.

== Service history ==
=== Atlantic Fleet, 1942–1944 ===
Nuthatch crossed the Great Lakes and steamed down the St. Lawrence River into the Atlantic, and proceeded along the east coast for shakedown. Between January 1943 and April 1944, Nuthatch served in the Atlantic Fleet Convoy Escort Group, operating on the "Sugar" runs. Homeported at Norfolk, Virginia, she operated to and from Santiago, Cuba; Curaçao, Netherlands West Indies; Bermuda; St. Thomas, Virgin Islands; San Juan, Puerto Rico; Galveston, Texas; and Port Arthur, Texas; and other small ports in the Caribbean and Gulf area. Convoy organization on these runs consisted of one to three Naval or Merchant Marine cargo vessels and tankers escorted by two or three minesweepers.

=== Europe, 1944–1945 ===
Nuthatch departed the United States with her division MinDiv 21, on 7 April 1944 and headed east to Falmouth, in Cornwall. There she staged for the much awaited invasion of France, scheduled for early June.

The division sailed from Torquay on 5 June 1944, and before it began sweeping operations lost one of its units, Osprey (AM-56). Early on 6 June, the division started sweeping the coast of France in assault and check sweeps to assure safe passage channels for the landing craft. Sweeping continued after D-Day, and on 15 June, in the Baie de la Seine, a mine exploded close aboard Nuthatch on the port side forward. While no personnel injuries were incurred, the force of the explosion damaged the hull, stopped the engines, and made all electric gear inoperative. However, within two hours, she was underway again, and soon pulled out of range of German shore batteries.

Repairs completed in England, Nuthatch was soon back on the French side of the Channel. On 25 June as a unit of TF 129, she participated in sweeping operations for the bombardment of Cherbourg. Sweep operations in the area continued until 1 August when, with her entire squadron, COMINRON SEVEN, she headed for Gibraltar and duty with the 8th Fleet. Until 31 May 1945, Nuthatch, with MinDiv 21, swept mines and escorted ships in the western Mediterranean; Marseille, Oran, Naples, Bizerte, Valletta, Palermo, and La Maddalena being only a few of her stops. On 31 May, Nuthatch hoisted her homeward bound pennant and got underway for the United States.

=== Pacific, 1945–1946 ===
Arriving at Hampton Roads on 15 June, Nuthatch underwent repairs, and on 18 September, sailed for Panama and duty with the Pacific Fleet. She arrived at Pearl Harbor on 4 November only to receive orders to return to the United States for inactivation. Arriving at San Diego, on 31 December, she decommissioned on 3 June 1946, and entered the Pacific Reserve Fleet. Nuthatch was redesignated MSF-60 on 7 February 1955 and remained in the Reserve Fleet at San Diego until struck from the Navy List on 1 December 1966. She was sunk as a target for the Pacific Fleet.

Nuthatch earned two battle stars during World War II.
