= USS Strive =

Minesweeper of the United States Navy

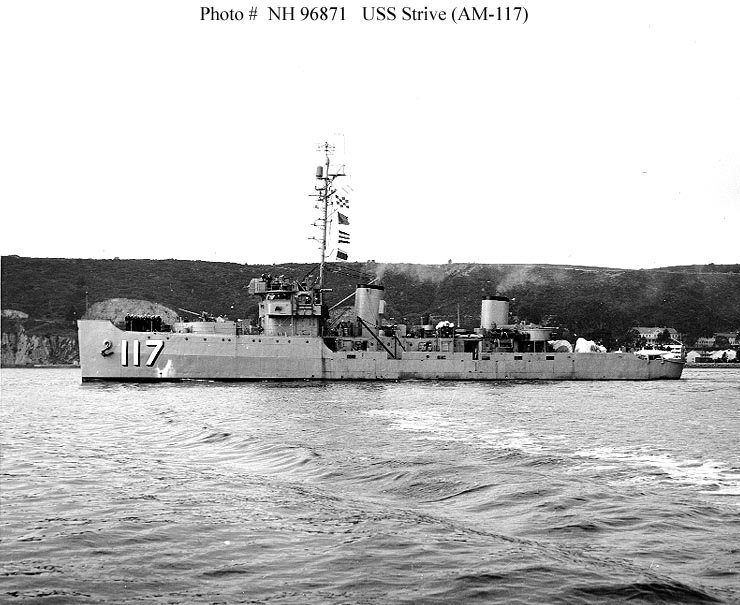

History

United States
- Name: USS Strive (AM-117)
- Builder: American Ship Building Company, Cleveland, Ohio
- Laid down: 17 November 1941
- Launched: 16 May 1942
- Commissioned: 27 October 1942
- Decommissioned: February 1946
- Recommissioned: 1 January 1952
- Decommissioned: 8 January 1955
- Reclassified: MSF-117, 7 February 1955
- Reclassified: MMC-1, 31 October 1958
- Stricken: 1 October 1959
- Honors and awards: 7 battle stars (World War II)
- Fate: Sold to Norway, 1 October 1959

History

Norway
- Name: HNoMS Gor (N48)
- Acquired: 1 October 1959
- Decommissioned: 1976
- Fate: unknown

General characteristics
- Class & type: Auk-class minesweeper
- Displacement: 890 long tons (904 t)
- Length: 221 ft 3 in (67.44 m)
- Beam: 32 ft (9.8 m)
- Draft: 10 ft 9 in (3.28 m)
- Speed: 18 knots (33 km/h; 21 mph)
- Complement: 100 officers and enlisted
- Armament: 1 × 3"/50 caliber gun; 2 × 40 mm guns

USS Strive (AM-117) was an Auk-class minesweeper acquired by the United States Navy for the dangerous task of removing mines from minefields laid in the water to prevent ships from passing.

Strive was laid down on 17 November 1941 by the American Ship Building Company, Cleveland, Ohio; launched on 16 May 1942; sponsored by Mrs. G. Lottrall; and commissioned on 27 October 1942.

== Atlantic coast ==
Strive departed Cleveland on 20 November and proceeded, via the St. Lawrence River, to the Atlantic. She arrived at Boston on 10 December 1942 and held her shakedown cruise between there and Casco Bay, Maine. Following operations along the U.S. East Coast, she sailed from New York Harbor on 19 March with a task group bound, via Bermuda, for North Africa. She arrived at Ténès, Algeria, on 13 April and operated between Algerian and Tunisian ports for the next few months.

== Invasion of Sicily operations ==
Strive joined the invasion force en route to Palermo, Sicily, and arrived off the landing beaches on 9 July. She swept mines and patrolled off the beachhead until the 15th, and returned to Palermo on 1 August. The minesweeper then escorted a convoy to Bizerte to join Task Force (TF) 81, the Salerno invasion force. She sailed early in September for Italy. The minesweeper preceded the fleet toward the beaches, clearing paths for the transports and landing craft. As the Allied 5th Army landed on 9 September, Strive guided landing craft through swept channels to the beaches and led cruisers to positions to support the landing forces. The ships were under enemy air attack from the 9th to the 11th, but Strive was not damaged. When her mission had been accomplished, she escorted convoys between North African ports and Naples until late December 1943. She was attached to Mine Squadron 6 in early December and remained in that squadron while operating in the European theater.

Strive operated in the Gulf of Naples until 13 January 1944 when she was attached to landing force TF 81 which was to land American and British troops in the Anzio-Nettuno area, 60 miles behind German lines. The ships sortied on 21 January, and Strive arrived at the assault area in the early hours of 22 January (D-Day). She swept mines and acted as a patrol ship until 2 February when she escorted a convoy to Naples and then proceeded to Bizerte. The ship shuttled between North African and Italian ports until 21 April when she departed Naples for Anzio to sweep and patrol from 22 to 29 April. Strive was at Anzio from 28 May to 9 June and again from 2 to 7 August.

== Invasion of Southern France operations ==
Strive was at Salerno on 11 August; and, three days later, she was assigned to "Operation Dragoon", the invasion of southern France. She arrived at the assault area off St. Raphael on the morning of 15 August. The minesweepers cleared a transport area and swept lanes to the beaches. Strive then swept and patrolled the Golfe de Frejus area until the 28th when she began sweeping off Toulon. Strive returned to Naples on 9 October and to Oran on 15 November.

== Stateside overhaul ==
Strive joined a landing craft convoy as an escort and sailed on 24 November for the United States. She arrived at Hampton Roads, Virginia, on 11 December 1944 and entered the Norfolk Navy Yard for an overhaul.

== Pacific Ocean operations ==
Strive got underway on 15 February with a task unit bound for Hawaii, transited the Panama Canal, and arrived at Pearl Harbor on 18 March. On 27 April, the minesweeper headed for the Marshall Islands and arrived at Eniwetok on 6 May. The next day, she sailed for the Marianas as a convoy escort. Strive called at Guam on the 11th, sailed the next day for Okinawa, and arrived at Kerama Retto on the 20th. Strive swept off Iheya Retto from 3 June until the 11th when she turned to patrol duty out of Kerama Retto.

On 13 August, two days before hostilities ended, she was ordered to sweep the "Skagway" area of the East China Sea. She swept Kagoshima Bay from 1 to 9 September, and Bungo Suido from 22 September until early October, when she returned to Okinawa. In November, she swept the "Sherlys" area off Formosa. On 20 December, she departed Kiirin, Formosa, for China and arrived at Shanghai on 22 December 1945.

== Post-World War II operations ==
In early January 1946, the minesweeper began the long voyage back to the United States. She called at Eniwetok late in January, stopped at Pearl Harbor from 2 to 7 February, and arrived at San Pedro, California, on 14 February. She moved down to San Diego and was given a pre-inactivation overhaul prior to being decommissioned. Strive was placed in reserve, out of commission, and attached to the 19th Fleet at San Diego, California.

== Recommissioning ==
Strive was recommissioned on 1 January 1952. After refresher training in the San Diego Bay area, she sailed for South Carolina, via Acapulco, Mexico, Panama, and Guantanamo Bay, arriving at Charleston, South Carolina, on 19 April. She operated between Charleston and Norfolk until 25 August when she commenced operations with the Atlantic Fleet.

Strive visited Falmouth, England, in September and moved on into the Mediterranean in October. She spent most of the next 14 months there, making port calls at Naples, Piraeus, La Spezia, Golfe Juan, Lisbon, Toulon, and other exotic ports.

== Final decommissioning ==
The ship was reclassified fleet minesweeper (MSF-117) (Steel-hulled) on 7 February 1955. Strive was again placed in reserve, out of commission, on 8 January 1955, attached to the Atlantic Reserve Fleet, and berthed at Green Cove Springs, Florida. Her designation was changed again on 31 October 1958 to MMC-1. Strive was struck from the Navy list on 1 October 1959 and transferred to Norway the same day.

== Awards ==
Strive received seven battle stars for service in World War II.
