= HMS Tattoo =

Minesweeper of the Royal Navy

History

United Kingdom
- Name: HMS Tattoo
- Builder: Gulf Shipbuilding Corporation, Chickasaw, Alabama
- Laid down: 8 June 1942 as (BAM-32)
- Launched: 27 January 1943
- Completed: 26 October 1943, and transferred to the UK under Lend-Lease
- Fate: Returned to the US, January 1947; Transferred to the Foreign Liquidation Commission and sold to Turkey

History

Turkey
- Name: TCG Çarşamba (AGS-1, A-594)
- Namesake: Çarşamba
- Acquired: March 1947
- Reclassified: survey ship
- Stricken: 1985

General characteristics
- Class & type: Catherine-class minesweeper
- Displacement: 890 long tons (904 t)
- Length: 221 ft 3 in (67.44 m)
- Beam: 32 ft (9.8 m)
- Draught: 10 ft 9 in (3.28 m)
- Speed: 18 knots (33 km/h; 21 mph)
- Complement: 100
- Armament: 1 × 3"/50 caliber gun; 2 × 40 mm guns; 2 × 20 mm guns; 2 × Depth charge tracks

HMS Tattoo was an Auk-class minesweeper of the Royal Navy during the Second World War. She was laid down by Gulf Shipbuilding Corporation (Chickasaw, Alabama) on 8 June 1942 as BAM-32 and launched on 27 January 1943. She was transferred to the Royal Navy and commissioned as HMS Tattoo on 26 October 1943.

Tattoo served for part of World War II patrolling off Iceland. At one point, she returned to Britain for repairs to a fouled propeller.

She returned to the United States in 1947, sold to the Turkish Navy in March 1947 as a survey ship and renamed TCG Çarşamba (AGS-1, later A-594).

She was stricken from the Naval Register in 1985.
