= HMS Frolic =

Five vessels of the British Royal Navy have been named HMS Frolic.

- The first HMS Frolic (1806) was an 18-gun 384 ton brig-sloop in service from 1806 to 1813. See also Capture of HMS Frolic.
- The second HMS Frolic (1820) was a 10-gun 236 ton brig-sloop launched in 1820 and sold 1838.
- The third HMS Frolic (1842) was a 16-gun 511 ton sloop launched in 1842 and sold 1864.
- The fourth HMS Frolic (1872) was a composite screw gunboat launched in 1872. Converted to a drillship in 1888. Renamed WV.30 on conversion to a Coastguard watchvessel in 1893 and renamed WV.41 in 1897. Sold in April 1908.
- The fifth HMS Frolic (1943) was a Lend-Lease Auk-class minesweeper launched in 1943, returned to the United States Navy in 1947, and in turn sold to the Turkish Navy as a survey ship, serving as TCG Çandarlı (AGS-2, later A-593) until 1986.
