= USS Tanager =

The United States Navy lists two vessels with the name USS Tanager:

- USS Tanager (AM-5) laid down on 28 September 1917 at New York City.
- USS Tanager (AM-385) laid down at Lorain, Ohio, on 29 March 1944.
