= USS Pochard =

Minesweeper of the United States Navy

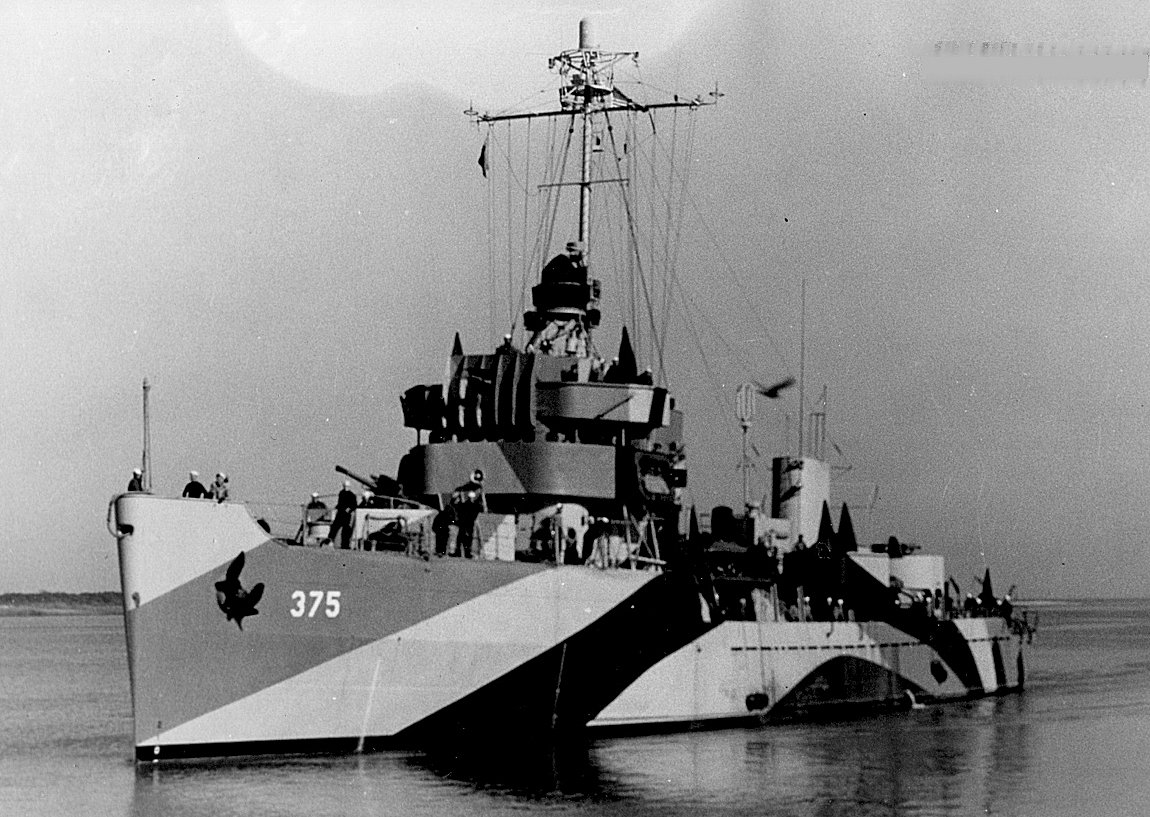
- Pochard at Little Creek, Virginia on 13 February 1945

History

United States
- Name: USS Pochard
- Builder: Savannah Machine and Foundry Co., Savannah, Georgia
- Laid down: 10 February 1944
- Launched: 11 June 1944
- Commissioned: 27 November 1944
- Decommissioned: 15 January 1947
- Recommissioned: 27 February 1952
- Decommissioned: 3 August 1955
- Reclassified: MSF-375, 7 February 1955
- Stricken: 1 December 1966
- Honours and awards: 3 battle stars (World War II)
- Fate: Sold for scrap

General characteristics
- Class & type: Auk-class minesweeper
- Displacement: 890 long tons (904 t)
- Length: 221 ft 3 in (67.44 m)
- Beam: 32 ft (9.8 m)
- Draft: 10 ft 9 in (3.28 m)
- Speed: 18 knots (33 km/h; 21 mph)
- Complement: 100 officers and enlisted
- Armament: 1 × 3"/50 caliber gun; 2 × 40 mm guns; 2 × 20 mm guns; 2 × Depth charge tracks

USS Pochard (AM-375) was an Auk-class minesweeper acquired by the United States Navy for the dangerous task of removing mines from minefields laid in the water to prevent ships from passing.

Pochard was named after the pochard, a heavy-bodied diving duck.

Pochard was laid down by Savannah Machine and Foundry Co., Savannah, Georgia, 10 February 1944; launched 11 June 1944; sponsored by Mrs. Mary E. Kennard; and commissioned 27 November 1944.

== World War II Pacific operations ==
After fitting out and shakedown, she departed Norfolk, Virginia, for the Panama Canal Zone on 19 February 1945 escorting Shellbark (AN-67). She then proceeded to San Francisco, California, and San Diego, California, and sailed for Pearl Harbor; Eniwetok, Marshall Islands; and Guam; arriving Okinawa on 28 June. During July and August she conducted minesweeping operations around Kerama Retto.

On 22 August Pochard was assigned to Commander 3rd Fleet, and proceeded to Tokyo Bay, arriving on the 29th. She remained in Tokyo Bay only a short period before sailing for Okinoyama Shoals, Sagami Wan, to conduct mine sweeping operations.

Pochard remained in the Far East conducting minesweeping operations until 26 March 1946. She then returned to the United States for inactivation, decommissioning 15 January 1947.

== Second commissioning ==
Pochard was berthed at San Diego, California, as a unit of the Pacific Reserve Fleet until recommissioned 27 February 1952. On 19 May she reported for duty with the Atlantic Fleet, at Charleston, South Carolina, whence she operated alternating U.S. East Coast and Caribbean cruises with Mediterranean deployments until 1955.

== Final decommissioning ==
Reclassified MSF-375, 7 February 1955, she was placed in reserve in June and decommissioned on 3 August. Assigned to the Florida Group, Atlantic Reserve Fleet, she was berthed at Green Cove Springs, Florida until struck from the Navy List 1 December 1966 and sold for scrap.

== Awards ==
Pochard received three battle stars for World War II service.
