= USS Swerve (AM-121) =

Minesweeper of the United States Navy

Coordinates: 41°31′N 12°28′E

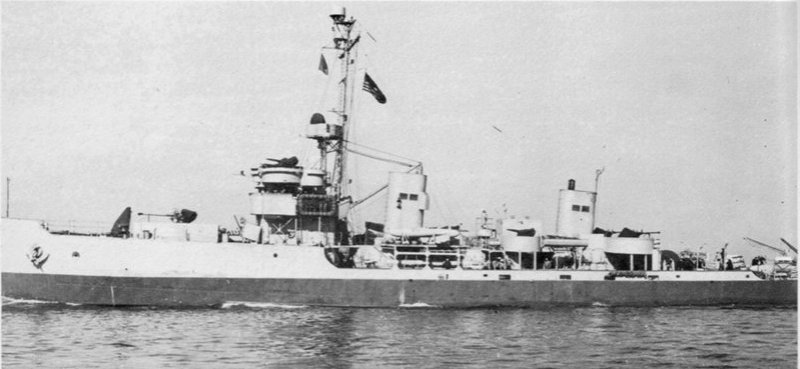
- USS Swerve

History

United States
- Name: USS Swerve
- Builder: John H. Mathis & Company, Camden, New Jersey
- Laid down: 27 May 1942
- Launched: 25 February 1943
- Sponsored by: Ms. E. C. Draemel
- Commissioned: 23 January 1944
- Stricken: 22 August 1944
- Motto: We Should Have Swerved
- Honors and awards: 1 Battle Star (World War II)
- Fate: Sunk by striking a mine, 9 July 1944

General characteristics
- Class & type: Auk-class minesweeper
- Displacement: 890 long tons (904 t)
- Length: 221 ft 3 in (67.44 m)
- Beam: 32 ft (9.8 m)
- Draft: 10 ft 9 in (3.28 m)
- Speed: 18 kn (21 mph; 33 km/h)
- Complement: 105 officers and enlisted
- Armament: 1 × 3 in (76 mm)/50 cal dual-purpose gun, 2 × 40 mm anti-aircraft guns

USS Swerve (AM-121) was an Auk-class minesweeper acquired by the United States Navy during World War II. She was launched in 1943 and commissioned early the next year. Swerve saw service in the Mediterranean, and was sunk by a mine in the Tyrrhenian Sea in July 1944.

== Construction and commissioning ==
Swerve was the first U.S. Navy vessel so named. She was laid down on 27 May 1942 by John H. Mathis & Company, Camden, New Jersey; launched on 25 February 1943; sponsored by Ms. E. C. Draemel; and commissioned on 23 January 1944.

Swerve held sea trials from 1–14 February and sailed for Little Creek, Virginia, on the 15th to begin her shakedown cruise. Most of March was spent in a post-shakedown availability and in training.

== Deployment ==
On 29 March, as a member of Mine Division 18 (MinDiv 18), she sailed to Charleston, South Carolina. Swerve stood out of Charleston on 7 April as an escort for convoy CK-2 en route to Bermuda. The convoy arrived there on the 18th, and on 8 May sailed to the Azores. Swerve called at Gibraltar and proceeded to Naples, Italy.

== Italian coast minesweeping ==
The minesweeper sailed for Palermo, Sicily on 20 May and arrived there the next day. She made a voyage to Bizerte and returned to Naples. The ship sailed for Anzio on 4 June, and arrived off the beach the next day.

Swerve remained off Anzio from 5–18 June. The ship was under enemy air attacks on the 5th and 9th but was not damaged. On the 19th, she sailed to Malta – via Naples – for degaussing. Training exercises were held off Salerno from 22 June — 4 July. The next day, the minesweeper sailed for Anzio again.

== Sinking by sea mine ==
Swerve was sweeping mines off Anzio on 9 July when, at 13:00, she struck a mine. There was an underwater explosion under her port quarter, and three minutes later, she had a 10° list to port. The order was given to abandon ship at 13:07, and — one minute later — the port rail was under water. The ship continued turning slowly and sinking by the stern. Fifteen minutes after hitting the mine, Swerve's bow was up with the stern resting on the bottom. An hour later, the ship sank from sight. Three men died as a result.

Swerve was struck from the Naval Vessel Register on 22 August 1944.

== Awards ==
Swerve received one battle star for her World War II service.
