= Auk-class minesweeper =

1942 class of minesweepers of the United States Navy

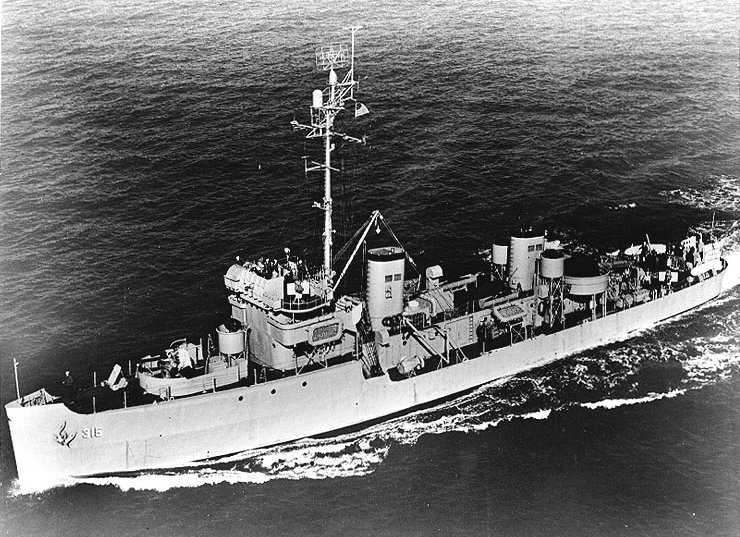
- USS Chief (AM-315) underway in 1952

Class overview
- Name: Auk class
- Builders: (10 builders in 9 states)
- Operators: United States Navy; Royal Navy (under Lend-Lease); Post WWII; Hellenic Navy; Philippine Navy; Republic of Korea Navy; Turkish Naval Forces; Mexican Navy; Republic of China Navy
- Preceded by: Raven class
- Succeeded by: USS Eagle

General characteristics
- Type: Minesweeper
- Displacement: 890 long tons (900 t); 1,100 long tons (1,100 t) (full load)
- Length: 221 ft 2 in (67.41 m)
- Beam: 32 ft 0 in (9.75 m)
- Draft: 11 ft 0 in (3.35 m)
- Installed power: 3,500 shp (2,600 kW)
- Propulsion: 2 × Diesel–electric drives; 2 × screws
- Speed: 9–12 kn (17–22 km/h; 10–14 mph) (cruising); 18 kn (33 km/h; 21 mph) (maximum)
- Complement: 105
- Armament: Varied; 2 × 3 in (76 mm)/50 caliber gun (aft gun removed in AM-314 and up); 2 × 40 mm (1.57 in) Bofors guns (added in place of aft gun in AM-314 and up); 8 × 20 mm (0.79 in) Oerlikon cannons (varied from 4 in early ships to 8 in later ships); 2 × depth charge tracks; 5 × k-guns; AM-371 and up; 4 × k-guns; 1 × Hedegehog

The Auk class were a class of 93 minesweepers serving with the United States Navy and the Royal Navy during World War II.

== Design and development ==
Prior to the United States entering World War II, they had produced two ships of the Raven-class minesweeper for testing. From these two examples it was decided that the use of diesel-electric engines to power the ship and the minesweeping equipment, rather than separate geared diesel engines to propel the ship and diesel generators to operate the minesweeping equipment, would work better. The Royal Navy placed an order for 32 of these minesweepers from the United States, BAM-1 – BAM-32. Because of the additional equipment, the displacement was raised from 810 long tons (820 t) on the Ravens, to 890 long tons (900 t) on what would come to be known as the Auk class in the USN, and the Catherine class in the RN.

The Auk class displaced 890 long tons, with a length of 221 ft 1 in (67.39 m), a beam of 32 ft 2 in (9.80 m), and a draft of 10 ft 9 in (3.28 m). They had a maximum speed of 18.1 kn (33.5 km/h; 20.8 mph). The Auks armament varied. All were equipped with a 3-inch (76 mm) gun on the bow, but many had their aft 3-inch gun removed or replaced by two 40 mm (1.57 in) Bofors guns. Originally designed with four 20 mm (0.79 in) Oerlikon cannon, some ships mounted as many as eight.

Five manufacturers provided the diesel-electric engines used in the class. These included the Cleveland Diesel Engine Division of General Motors, Cooper Bessemer, Baldwin Locomotive Works, the American Locomotive Company (ALCO) and Busch-Sulzer. Twenty of the original 32 ships ordered by the Royal Navy were delivered, with an additional two coming from the USN program. They were given "J" pennant number prefixes. Of these twenty-two, three were sunk in action and 19 were returned to the US after the war. Eleven minesweepers of the Auk class were lost in the war, six to direct enemy action including USS Skill, torpedoed by U-593.

At least two vessels were in service in February 2026, in the Mexican Navy, Mariano Matomoros (ex-USS Sage) and Valentine Gómez Farias (ex-USS Starling).

== Construction ==
The ships were constructed in 11 shipyards, by 10 companies, in 9 states.

- American Ship Building Company, Lorain, Ohio
- American Ship Building Company, Cleveland, Ohio
- Associated Shipbuilders, Puget Sound, Washington
- Defoe Shipbuilding Company, Bay City, Michigan
- General Engineering & Dry Dock Company, Alameda, California
- Gulf Shipbuilding, Madisonville, Louisiana
- John H. Mathis & Company, Camden, New Jersey
- Norfolk Navy Yard, Norfolk, Virginia
- Pennsylvania Shipyards, Inc., Beaumont, Texas
- Savannah Machine & Foundry, Savannah, Georgia
- Winslow Marine Railway and Shipbuilding Company, Puget Sound, Washington

== List of ships ==
=== Royal Navy Catherine-class minesweepers ===
Ship name	Pennant number	Transfer date	Builder	Ship power	Notes
HMS Catherine (J12) ex-BAM-9	J12	7 September 1943	Associated Shipbuilders, Puget Sound, Washington	2 × 1,710 shp (1,280 kW) Cooper Bessemer GSB-8, National Supply Company single reduction gear	Returned to US, in 1946, sold to Turkey, in January 1947, and renamed Erdemli, stricken 1963
Cato ex-BAM-10	J16	7 September 1943	Associated Shipbuilders, Puget Sound, Washington	2 × 1,710 shp (1,280 kW) Cooper Bessemer GSB-8, National Supply Company single reduction gear	Sunk, 6 July 1944, by German Neger human torpedo
Chamois ex-BAM-12	J28	22 October 1943	Associated Shipbuilders, Puget Sound, Washington	2 × 1,710 shp (1,280 kW) Cooper Bessemer GSB-8, National Supply Company single reduction gear	Damaged by mine, 21 July 1944, returned to US custody 10 December 1946, sold in 1948, and renamed Morning Star, scrapped 1960
Chance ex-BAM-13	J340	13 November 1943	Associated Shipbuilders, Puget Sound, Washington	2 × 1,710 shp (1,280 kW) Cooper Bessemer GSB-8, National Supply Company single reduction gear	Returned to US, 1946, sold to Turkey, 1947, renamed Edremit, stricken 1973
Combatant ex-BAM-14	J341	22 November 1943	Associated Shipbuilders, Puget Sound, Washington	2 × 1,710 shp (1,280 kW) Cooper Bessemer GSB-8, National Supply Company single reduction gear	Returned to US, 15 December 1946, sold to Greece 1947, sold to P. Kondyliotis of Piraeus, in July 1953, and renamed Panagyros, later renamed Diamanto, in August 1964, and Sophia Saranti in October 1969, sold to Ferlosa Maritime under Panamanian registry
Cynthia ex-BAM-15	J345	7 December 1943	Associated Shipbuilders, Puget Sound, Washington	2 × 1,710 shp (1,280 kW) Cooper Bessemer GSB-8, National Supply Company single reduction gear	Returned to US, 20 January 1947, scrapped 1947
Elfreda ex-BAM-16 ex-USS Overseer (AM-321)	J402	22 December 1943	Associated Shipbuilders, Puget Sound, Washington	2 × 1,988 shp (1,482 kW) Baldwin VO8, Westinghouse single reduction gear	Returned to US, 30 June 1947, sold to Turkey, 3 November 1947, renamed Çesme, stricken 1974
Fairy ex-BAM-25	J403	24 March 1944	Associated Shipbuilders, Puget Sound, Washington	2 × 1,710 shp (1,280 kW) Cooper Bessemer GSB-8, National Supply Company single reduction gear	Returned to US, 13 December 1946, scrapped 1947
Florizel ex-BAM-26	J404	14 April 1944	Associated Shipbuilders, Puget Sound, Washington	2 × 1,710 shp (1,280 kW) Cooper Bessemer GSB-8, National Supply Company single reduction gear	Returned to US, December 1946, sold to Greece 1947, and renamed Aida, converted to a cargo ship in 1952, sold in 1959, and renamed Lasithi, scrapped in 1967, at Messina
Foam ex-BAM-27	J405	28 April 1944	Associated Shipbuilders, Puget Sound, Washington	2 × 1,710 shp (1,280 kW) Cooper Bessemer GSB-8, National Supply Company single reduction gear	Returned to US, 13 November 1946, scrapped 1947
Frolic ex-BAM-28	J406	18 May 1944	Associated Shipbuilders, Puget Sound, Washington	2 × 1,710 shp (1,280 kW) Cooper Bessemer GSB-8, National Supply Company single reduction gear	Returned to US, January 1947, sold to Turkey, 1947, renamed Çandarli, became survey ship in 1960s, stricken 1986
Gazelle ex-BAM-17	J342	28 July 1943	Savannah Machine & Foundry, Savannah, Georgia	2 × 1,710 shp (1,280 kW) Cooper Bessemer GSB-8, National Supply Company single reduction gear	Returned to US, December 1946
Gorgon ex-BAM-18	J346	28 August 1943	Savannah Machine & Foundry, Savannah, Georgia	2 × 1,710 shp (1,280 kW) Cooper Bessemer GSB-8, National Supply Company single reduction gear	Returned to US, December 1946, sold to Greece, registered as merchant ship by S. Sofianos of Piraeus, in 1953, renamed Gorgona, scrapped September 1953, at Perama
Grecian ex-BAM-19	J352	22 September 1943	Savannah Machine & Foundry, Savannah, Georgia	2 × 1,710 shp (1,280 kW) Cooper Bessemer GSB-8, National Supply Company single reduction gear	Returned to US custody at England, in 1946, sold to Turkey, 1947, renamed Edincik, stricken 1974
Jasper ex-BAM-29 ex-Garnet	J407	12 August 1944	Associated Shipbuilders, Puget Sound, Washington	2 × 1,710 shp (1,280 kW) Cooper Bessemer GSB-8, National Supply Company single reduction gear	Returned to US custody at England, 24 December 1946, sold to Foustinos Brothers. 1947, rebuilt as inter-island ferry and renamed Pantelis, Laid up 1968, capsized and sank at moorings at Ambelakia, Salamis Island, 6 December 1971, later broken up in situ
Magic ex-BAM-20	J400	25 October 1943	Savannah Machine & Foundry, Savannah, Georgia	2 × 1,710 shp (1,280 kW) Cooper Bessemer GSB-8, National Supply Company single reduction gear	Sunk, 6 July 1944, by German Neger human torpedo
Pique ex-BAM-11 ex-Celerity	J23	30 August 1943	Associated Shipbuilders, Puget Sound, Washington	2 × 1,710 shp (1,280 kW) Cooper Bessemer GSB-8, National Supply Company single reduction gear	Returned to US, 1946, sold to Turkey, 1947, renamed Ereğli
Pylades ex-BAM-21	J401	24 November 1943	Savannah Machine & Foundry, Savannah, Georgia	2 × 1,710 shp (1,280 kW) Cooper Bessemer GSB-8, National Supply Company single reduction gear	Sunk, 8 July 1944, by German Biber midget submarine
Steadfast ex-BAM-31	J375	29 September 1943	Gulf Shipbuilding, Madisonville, Louisiana	2 × 1,710 shp (1,280 kW) Cooper Bessemer GSB-8, National Supply Company single reduction gear	Returned to US, 24 December 1946, sold to Turkey, 1947, renamed Eregli, stricken 1973
Strenuous ex-USS Vital (AM-129)	J335	18 May 1943	Gulf Shipbuilding, Madisonville, Louisiana	2 × 1,766 shp (1,317 kW) Electro-Motive Division 12-278, Farrel Birmingham single reduction gear	Returned to US, 10 December 1946, sold, 23 April 1947, renamed Evening Star, renamed Pride of the West, broken up in Germany, July 1956
Tattoo ex-BAM-32	J374	26 October 1943	Gulf Shipbuilding, Chickasaw, Alabama	2 × 1,710 shp (1,280 kW) Cooper Bessemer GSB-8, National Supply Company single reduction gear	Returned to US, January 1947, sold to Turkey, 1947, renamed Çarsamba, stricken 1985
Tourmaline ex-USS Usage (AM-130)	J339	7 June 1943	Gulf Shipbuilding, Chickasaw, Alabama	2 × 1,766 shp (1,317 kW) Electro-Motive Division 12-278, Farrel Birmingham single reduction gear	Returned to US, January 1947, sold to Turkey, 1947, renamed Çardak, stricken 1974

=== US Navy Auk-class minesweepers ===
Ship name	Hull number	Builder	Ship power	Notes
Ardent ex-HMS Buffalo BAM-8	AM-340	General Engineering & Dry Dock Company, Alameda, California	2 × 1,988 shp (1,482 kW) Baldwin VO8, Westinghouse single reduction gear	Decommissioned, December 1946, stricken, 1 July 1972, sold to the Mexican Navy on 19 September 1972, renamed Juan N. Álvarez
Auk	AM-57	Norfolk Navy Yard, Norfolk, Virginia	2 × 1,559 shp (1,163 kW) ALCO 539, Westinghouse single reduction gear	Decommissioned, 15 July 1946, stricken, 1 August 1956
Broadbill	AM-58	Defoe Shipbuilding Company, Bay City, Michigan	2 × 1,559 shp (1,163 kW) ALCO 539, Westinghouse single reduction gear	Decommissioned, 25 January 1954, stricken, 1 July 1972, sold, 1 December 1973, renamed Anaconda
Champion ex-HMS Akbar BAM-1	AM-314	General Engineering & Dry Dock Company, Alameda, California	2 × 1,988 shp (1,482 kW) Baldwin VO8, Westinghouse single reduction gear	Decommissioned, 30 January 1947, stricken 1 July 1972, transferred to the Mexican Navy, 19 September 1972, renamed Mariano Escobar, still in active service
Chickadee	AM-59	Defoe Shipbuilding Company, Bay City, Michigan	2 × 1,559 shp (1,163 kW) ALCO 539, Westinghouse single reduction gear	Decommissioned, 15 May 1946, transferred to the National Navy of Uruguay, 18 August 1966, renamed Comandante Pedro Campbell, converted for Antarctic expeditions, stricken 12 December 2003, used as training hulk
Chief ex-HMS Alice BAM-2	AM-315	General Engineering & Dry Dock Company, Alameda, California	2 × 1,988 shp (1,482 kW) Baldwin VO8, Westinghouse single reduction gear	Grounded, 1 February 1944, decommissioned, 1 November 1954, stricken, 1 July 1972, sold to the Mexican Navy, 16 February 1973, renamed Jesus Gonzalez Ortega
Competent ex-HMS Amelia BAM-3	AM-316	General Engineering & Dry Dock Company, Alameda, California	2 × 1,988 shp (1,482 kW) Baldwin VO8, Westinghouse single reduction gear	Decommissioned, 15 April 1955, sold to the Mexican Navy, 20 September 1972, renamed Ponciano Arriaga
Defense ex-HMS Amity BAM-4	AM-317	General Engineering & Dry Dock Company, Alameda, California	2 × 1,988 shp (1,482 kW) Baldwin VO8, Westinghouse single reduction gear	Decommissioned, 15 April 1955, stricken, 1 July 1972, sold to the Mexican Navy, 3 January 1973, renamed Manuel Doblado
Devastator ex-HMS Augusta BAM-5	AM-318	General Engineering & Dry Dock Company, Alameda, California	2 × 1,988 shp (1,482 kW) Baldwin VO8, Westinghouse single reduction gear	Decommissioned, 15 April 1955, sold to the Mexican Navy, 1973, renamed Sabastian Lerdo de Tejada
Dextrous ex-HMS Sepoy BAM-30	AM-341	Gulf Shipbuilding, Madisonville, Louisiana	2 × 1,766 shp (1,317 kW) Electro-Motive Division 12-278, Farrel Birmingham single reduction gear	Decommissioned, 31 October 1956, transferred to the South Korean Navy, December 1967, renamed Koje
Gladiator ex-HMS Blaze BAM-6	AM-319	General Engineering & Dry Dock Company, Alameda, California	2 × 1,988 shp (1,482 kW) Baldwin VO8, Westinghouse single reduction gear	Decommissioned, 15 March 1959, stricken, 1 July 1972, sold to the Mexican Navy, 19 September 1972, renamed Santos Degollado, Sunk as a dive wreck, 3 March 2022
Heed	AM-100	General Engineering & Dry Dock Company, Alameda, California	2 × 1,559 shp (1,163 kW) Busch-Sulzer 539, Westinghouse single reduction gear	Decommissioned, 27 January 1954, stricken, 1 March 1967
Herald	AM-101	General Engineering & Dry Dock Company, Alameda, California	2 × 1,559 shp (1,163 kW) Busch-Sulzer 539, Westinghouse single reduction gear	Decommissioned, 15 April 1955, stricken, 1 July 1972, sold to the Mexican Navy, 1 February 1973, renamed Mariano Matamoros
Impeccable ex-HMS Brutus BAM-7	AM-320	General Engineering & Dry Dock Company, Alameda, California	2 × 1,988 shp (1,482 kW) Baldwin VO8, Westinghouse single reduction gear	Decommissioned, 14 October 1955, stricken, 1 July 1972, sold for scrap, 1 April 1974
Minivet	AM-371	Savannah Machine & Foundry, Savannah, Georgia	2 × 1,766 shp (1,317 kW) Electro-Motive Division 12-278, Westinghouse single reduction gear	Sunk by mine, in the Tsushima Strait, 29 December 1945, stricken, 21 January 1946
Motive	AM-102	General Engineering & Dry Dock Company, Alameda, California	2 × 1,559 shp (1,163 kW) Busch-Sulzer 539, Westinghouse single reduction gear	Decommissioned, 15 June 1946, stricken, 1 December 1966, sunk as a target, April 1968
Murrelet	AM-372	Savannah Machine & Foundry, Savannah, Georgia	2 × 1,766 shp (1,317 kW) Electro-Motive Division 12-278, Westinghouse single reduction gear	Decommissioned, 14 March 1957, stricken, 1 December 1964, transferred to the Philippine Navy, 18 June 1965, renamed Rizal, decommissioned in 2020, and waiting conversion to a museum ship.
Nuthatch	AM-60	Defoe Shipbuilding Company, Bay City, Michigan	2 × 1,559 shp (1,163 kW) ALCO 539, Westinghouse single reduction gear	Decommissioned, 3 June 1946, stricken, 1 December 1966, sunk as a target
Oracle	AM-103	General Engineering & Dry Dock Company, Alameda, California	2 × 1,559 shp (1,163 kW) Busch-Sulzer 539, Westinghouse single reduction gear	Decommissioned, 29 May 1946, stricken, 1 December 1966, sunk as a target 1967
Peregrine	AM-373	Savannah Machine & Foundry, Savannah, Georgia	2 × 1,766 shp (1,317 kW) Electro-Motive Division 12-278, Westinghouse single reduction gear	Decommissioned, 31 January 1969, stricken, 1 February 1969
Pheasant	AM-61	Defoe Shipbuilding Company, Bay City, Michigan	2 × 1,559 shp (1,163 kW) ALCO 539, Westinghouse single reduction gear	Decommissioned, December 1945, stricken, 1 December 1966, sunk as a target
Pigeon	AM-374	Savannah Machine & Foundry, Savannah, Georgia	2 × 1,766 shp (1,317 kW) Electro-Motive Division 12-278, Westinghouse single reduction gear	Decommissioned, 14 January 1955, stricken, 1 December 1966, sold for scrap, 6 October 1967
Pilot	AM-104	Pennsylvania Shipyards, Inc., Beaumont, Texas	2 × 1,559 shp (1,163 kW) Busch-Sulzer 539, Westinghouse single reduction gear	Decommissioned, October 1954, stricken, 1 July 1972, sold to the Mexican Navy, 19 July 1972, renamed Juan Aldama
Pioneer	AM-105	Pennsylvania Shipyards, Inc., Beaumont, Texas	2 × 1,559 shp (1,163 kW) Busch-Sulzer 539, Westinghouse single reduction gear	Decommissioned, 8 July 1946, stricken, 1 July 1972, sold to the Mexican Navy, 19 September 1972, renamed Leandro Valle
Pochard	AM-375	Savannah Machine & Foundry, Savannah, Georgia	2 × 1,766 shp (1,317 kW) Electro-Motive Division 12-278, Westinghouse single reduction gear	Decommissioned, 3 August 1955, stricken, 1 December 1966, sold for scrap, 17 November 1967
Portent	AM-106	Pennsylvania Shipyards, Inc., Beaumont, Texas	2 × 1,559 shp (1,163 kW) Busch-Sulzer 539, Westinghouse single reduction gear	Sunk by mine, off Anzio, Italy, on 22 January 1944, stricken, 6 March 1944
Prevail	AM-107	Pennsylvania Shipyards, Inc., Beaumont, Texas	2 × 1,559 shp (1,163 kW) Busch-Sulzer 539, Westinghouse single reduction gear	Decommissioned, 1963, stricken, 10 January 1964, sold for scrap, 13 October 1964
Ptarmigan	AM-376	Savannah Machine & Foundry, Savannah, Georgia	2 × 1,766 shp (1,317 kW) Electro-Motive Division 12-278, Westinghouse single reduction gear	Decommissioned, 17 May 1957, stricken, 1 July 1963, transferred to South Korea, 25 July 1963, renamed Shin Song, stricken, 1984
Pursuit	AM-108	Winslow Marine Railway and Shipbuilding Company, Puget Sound, Washington	2 × 1,559 shp (1,163 kW) Busch-Sulzer 539, Westinghouse single reduction gear	Decommissioned, 30 June 1960, stricken, 1 July 1960
Quail	AM-377	Savannah Machine & Foundry, Savannah, Georgia	2 × 1,766 shp (1,317 kW) Electro-Motive Division 12-278, Westinghouse single reduction gear	Decommissioned, April 1946, stricken, 1 December 1966
Redstart	AM-378	Savannah Machine & Foundry, Savannah, Georgia	2 × 1,766 shp (1,317 kW) Electro-Motive Division 12-278, Westinghouse single reduction gear	Decommissioned, 15 March 1957, stricken 1 April 1965, transferred to the Taiwan Navy, 25 July 1963, renamed Wu Sheng, stricken, 26 February 1998
Requisite	AM-109	Winslow Marine Railway and Shipbuilding Company, Puget Sound, Washington	2 × 1,559 shp (1,163 kW) Busch-Sulzer 539, Westinghouse single reduction gear	Decommissioned and stricken, 1 April 1964
Revenge ex-Right	AM-110	Winslow Marine Railway and Shipbuilding Company, Puget Sound, Washington	2 × 1,559 shp (1,163 kW) Busch-Sulzer 539, Westinghouse single reduction gear	Decommissioned, 9 March 1955, stricken, 1 April 1964, Sold for scrap in May 1967
Roselle	AM-379	Gulf Shipbuilding, Madisonville, Louisiana	2 × 1,766 shp (1,317 kW) Electro-Motive Division 12-278, Westinghouse single reduction gear	Decommissioned, 20 June 1946, stricken, 1 July 1972, transferred to the Mexican Navy, 1 February 1973, renamed Melchior Ocampo, reclassified and renamed, Guitierrez Zamora
Ruddy	AM-380	Gulf Shipbuilding, Madisonville, Louisiana	2 × 1,766 shp (1,317 kW) Electro-Motive Division 12-278, Westinghouse single reduction gear	Decommissioned, 31 August 1956, stricken, 17 May 1974, transferred to the Peruvian Navy, 1 November 1960, renamed Galvez, retired 1981
Sage	AM-111	Winslow Marine Railway and Shipbuilding Company, Puget Sound, Washington	2 × 1,559 shp (1,163 kW) Busch-Sulzer 539, Westinghouse single reduction gear	Decommissioned, 19 April 1955, stricken, 1 July 1972, sold to the Mexican Navy, 4 November 1973, renamed Hermenegildo Galeana, renamed, Mariano Matomoros, 1993
Scoter	AM-381	Gulf Shipbuilding, Madisonville, Louisiana	2 × 1,766 shp (1,317 kW) Electro-Motive Division 12-278, Westinghouse single reduction gear	Decommissioned, 16 April 1947, stricken, 1 December 1966, sold to the Mexican Navy, 19 September 1962, renamed Xicotencatl
Seer	AM-112	American Ship Building Company, Lorain, Ohio	2 × 1,766 shp (1,317 kW) Electro-Motive Division 12-278, Farrel Birmingham single reduction gear	Decommissioned, 11 March 1955, stricken, 1 March 1963, sold to the Royal Norwegian Navy, 15 December 1962, renamed Uller
Sentinel	AM-113	American Ship Building Company, Lorain, Ohio	2 × 1,766 shp (1,317 kW) Electro-Motive Division 12-278, Farrel Birmingham single reduction gear	Sunk in action, off Licata, Italy on 10 July 1943, stricken, 19 August 1943
Sheldrake	AM-62	General Engineering & Dry Dock Company, Alameda, California	2 × 1,559 shp (1,163 kW) ALCO 539, Westinghouse single reduction gear	Decommissioned, 1 August 1968, stricken 30 June 1968, sold for scrap, 2 November 1971
Shoveler	AM-382	Gulf Shipbuilding, Madisonville, Louisiana	2 × 1,766 shp (1,317 kW) Electro-Motive Division 12-278, Westinghouse single reduction gear	Decommissioned, 28 September 1956, stricken, 17 May 1974, loaned to the Peruvian Navy, 1 November 1960, transferred to the Peruvian Navy, 1 May 1974
Skill	AM-115	American Ship Building Company, Lorain, Ohio	2 × 1,766 shp (1,317 kW) Electro-Motive Division 12-278, Farrel Birmingham single reduction gear	Sunk in action, off Salerno, Italy, 25 September 1943, stricken, 11 November 1943
Skylark	AM-63	General Engineering & Dry Dock Company, Alameda, California	2 × 1,559 shp (1,163 kW) ALCO 539, Westinghouse single reduction gear	Sunk in action, off Hagushi beaches, near Yomitan, Okinawa, 28 April 1945, stricken, 28 April 1945
Spear ex-HMS Errant BAM-22	AM-322	Associated Shipbuilders, Puget Sound, Washington	2 × 1,766 shp (1,317 kW) Electro-Motive Division 12-278, Farrel Birmingham single reduction gear	Decommissioned, August 1946, stricken, 1 July 1972, sold to the Mexican Navy, 19 September 1972, renamed Ignacio De La Llave
Speed	AM-116	American Ship Building Company, Cleveland, Ohio	2 × 1,766 shp (1,317 kW) Electro-Motive Division 12-278, Farrel Birmingham single reduction gear	Decommissioned, 7 June 1946, stricken, transferred to South Korea, 17 November 1965, renamed Sunchon
Sprig	AM-384	American Ship Building Company, Lorain, Ohio	2 × 1,766 shp (1,317 kW) Electro-Motive Division 12-278, Westinghouse single reduction gear	Decommissioned, June 1954, stricken, 1 July 1972, sold for scrap, 20 December 1973
Staff	AM-114	American Ship Building Company, Cleveland, Ohio	2 × 1,766 shp (1,317 kW) Electro-Motive Division 12-278, Farrel Birmingham single reduction gear	Decommissioned, 15 August 1955, stricken, 1 March 1967, sold for scrap, 17 November 1967
Starling	AM-64	General Engineering & Dry Dock Company, Alameda, California	2 × 1,559 shp (1,163 kW) ALCO 539, Westinghouse single reduction gear	Decommissioned, 15 May 1946, stricken, 1 July 1972, sold to the Mexican Navy, 16 February 1973, renamed Valentin Gómez Farias
Steady	AM-118	American Ship Building Company, Cleveland, Ohio	2 × 1,766 shp (1,317 kW) Electro-Motive Division 12-278, Farrel Birmingham single reduction gear	Decommissioned, 18 June 1946, stricken 18 February 1968, transferred to the Taiwan Navy, 30 May 1968, renamed Mo Ling, sunk, 1970
Strive	AM-117	American Ship Building Company, Cleveland, Ohio	2 × 1,766 shp (1,317 kW) Electro-Motive Division 12-278, Farrel Birmingham single reduction gear	Decommissioned, 8 January 1955, stricken, 1 October 1959, sold to the Royal Norwegian Navy, renamed Gor
Surfbird	AM-383	American Ship Building Company, Lorain, Ohio	2 × 1,766 shp (1,317 kW) Electro-Motive Division 12-278, Westinghouse single reduction gear	Decommissioned, 18 December 1970, stricken, 21 February 1975, sold to a private company, 5 December 1975, renamed Helenka B
Sustain	AM-119	American Ship Building Company, Cleveland, Ohio	2 × 1,766 shp (1,317 kW) Electro-Motive Division 12-278, Farrel Birmingham single reduction gear	Decommissioned, 9 October 1954, stricken, 1 October 1959, sold to the Royal Norwegian Navy, renamed Tyr
Swallow	AM-65	General Engineering & Dry Dock Company, Alameda, California	2 × 1,559 shp (1,163 kW) ALCO 539, Westinghouse single reduction gear	Sunk in action, off Kerama Retto, in the Ryukyu Islands, on 22 April 1945, stricken, 2 June 1945
Sway	AM-120	John H. Mathis & Company, Camden, New Jersey	2 × 1,766 shp (1,317 kW) Electro-Motive Division 12-278, Farrel Birmingham single reduction gear	Decommissioned, 15 January 1947, stricken, 1 July 1972, sold to the Mexican Navy, renamed Ignacio Manuel Altamirano
Swerve	AM-121	John H. Mathis & Company, Camden, New Jersey	2 × 1,766 shp (1,317 kW) Electro-Motive Division 12-278, Farrel Birmingham single reduction gear	Sunk by mine, in action off Anzio, Italy, 9 June 1944, stricken, 22 August 1944
Swift	AM-122	John H. Mathis & Company, Camden, New Jersey	2 × 1,766 shp (1,317 kW) Electro-Motive Division 12-278, Farrel Birmingham single reduction gear	Decommissioned, 13 December 1955, stricken, 1 July 1972, scrapped
Symbol	AM-123	Savannah Machine & Foundry, Savannah, Georgia	2 × 1,766 shp (1,317 kW) Electro-Motive Division 12-278, Farrel Birmingham single reduction gear	Decommissioned, 27 July 1956, stricken, 1 July 1972, sold to the Mexican Navy, renamed Guillermo Prieto
Tanager	AM-385	American Ship Building Company, Lorain, Ohio	2 × 1,766 shp (1,317 kW) Electro-Motive Division 12-278, Westinghouse single reduction gear	Decommissioned, 10 December 1954, transferred to the US Coast Guard, 4 October 1963, commissioned USCGC Tanager (WTR-885), 16 July 1964, decommissioned, 1 February 1972, sold, 15 November 1972
Tercel	AM-386	American Ship Building Company, Lorain, Ohio	2 × 1,766 shp (1,317 kW) Electro-Motive Division 12-278, Westinghouse single reduction gear	Decommissioned, 10 November 1954, stricken, 1 July 1972, scrapped
Threat	AM-124	Savannah Machine & Foundry, Savannah, Georgia	2 × 1,766 shp (1,317 kW) Electro-Motive Division 12-278, Farrel Birmingham single reduction gear	Decommissioned, 31 May 1946, stricken, 1 July 1972, sold to the Mexican Navy, 1 February 1973, renamed Francisco Zarco
Tide	AM-125	Savannah Machine & Foundry, Savannah, Georgia	2 × 1,766 shp (1,317 kW) Electro-Motive Division 12-278, Farrel Birmingham single reduction gear	Sunk by mine, in action off the coast of Normandy, 7 June 1944, stricken, 29 July 1944
Token	AM-126	Gulf Shipbuilding, Madisonville, Louisiana	2 × 1,766 shp (1,317 kW) Electro-Motive Division 12-278, Farrel Birmingham single reduction gear	Decommissioned, 16 April 1954, stricken, 1 December 1966
Toucan	AM-387	American Ship Building Company, Cleveland, Ohio	2 × 1,766 shp (1,317 kW) Electro-Motive Division 12-278, Westinghouse single reduction gear	Decommissioned, 1 May 1957, stricken 1 July 1964, transferred to the Taiwan Navy, 2 December 1964, renamed Chien Men, sunk in action, 6 August 1965
Towhee	AM-388	American Ship Building Company, Cleveland, Ohio	2 × 1,766 shp (1,317 kW) Electro-Motive Division 12-278, Westinghouse single reduction gear	Decommissioned, 30 April 1969, stricken, 1 May 1969, sold for scrap, 6 March 1970
Triumph ex-HMS Espoir BAM-23	AM-323	Associated Shipbuilders, Puget Sound, Washington	2 × 1,766 shp (1,317 kW) Electro-Motive Division 12-278, Farrel Birmingham single reduction gear	Decommissioned, 29 August 1955, stricken, 1 March 1961, transferred to the Royal Norwegian Navy, 27 January 1961, renamed Brage, scrapped, 1978
Tumult	AM-127	Gulf Shipbuilding, Madisonville, Louisiana	2 × 1,766 shp (1,317 kW) Electro-Motive Division 12-278, Farrel Birmingham single reduction gear	Decommissioned, 21 September 1954, stricken, 1 May 1967, sold for scrap
Velocity	AM-128	Gulf Shipbuilding, Madisonville, Louisiana	2 × 1,766 shp (1,317 kW) Electro-Motive Division 12-278, Farrel Birmingham single reduction gear	Decommissioned, 7 October 1946, stricken, 1 July 1972, sold to the Mexican Navy, renamed Ignacio L. Vallarta
Vigilance ex-HMS Exploit BAM-24	AM-324	Associated Shipbuilders, Puget Sound, Washington	2 × 1,766 shp (1,317 kW) Electro-Motive Division 12-278, Farrel Birmingham single reduction gear	Decommissioned, 30 January 1947, stricken, 1 December 1966, transferred to the Philippine Navy, 19 August 1967, renamed Quezon
Waxwing	AM-389	American Ship Building Company, Lorain, Ohio	2 × 1,766 shp (1,317 kW) Electro-Motive Division 12-278, Westinghouse single reduction gear	Decommissioned, 1 May 1957, transferred to the Taiwan Navy, 14 October 1965, renamed Chu Yang, decommissioned 16 February 1998
Wheatear	AM-390	American Ship Building Company, Cleveland, Ohio	2 × 1,766 shp (1,317 kW) Electro-Motive Division 12-278, Westinghouse single reduction gear	Decommissioned, 17 November 1954, stricken, 1 July 1972, sold for scrap, 20 December 1973
Zeal	AM-131	Gulf Shipbuilding, Madisonville, Louisiana	2 × 1,766 shp (1,317 kW) Electro-Motive Division 12-278, Farrel Birmingham single reduction gear	Decommissioned, 6 July 1956, stricken, 1 December 1966, sunk as target, 9 January 1967

== See also ==
- Admirable-class minesweeper
- Agile-class minesweeper
- Classes of U.S. Navy minesweepers

== Bibliography ==
- Lenton, H.T. (1974). American Gunboats and Minesweepers. Macdonald and Jane's. ISBN 0356080641.
- Chesneau, Roger (2001). Conway's All The World's Fighting Ships 1922-1946. Conway Maritime Press. ISBN 0851771467.
- "Ocean Minesweepers (AM) Built or Acquired through WWII". 18 April 2015.
- "NavSource photo archive: index of mineSweepers". NavSource.
