= HMS Strenuous (J338) =

Minesweeper of the Royal Navy

History

United Kingdom
- Name: HMS Strenuous (J 338)
- Builder: Gulf Shipbuilding Corporation, Chickasaw, Alabama
- Laid down: 1 January 1942, as Vital (AM-129)
- Launched: 7 September 1942
- Completed: 18 May 1943, and transferred to the UK under Lend-Lease
- Fate: Returned to the US, 10 December 1946

United States
- Name: USS Strenuous (AM-129)
- Acquired: 10 December 1946
- Out of service: Declared surplus, 23 April 1947
- Fate: Sold, 1948. Scrapped, 1956

General characteristics
- Class & type: Auk-class minesweeper
- Displacement: 890 long tons (904 t)
- Length: 221 ft 3 in (67.44 m)
- Beam: 32 ft (9.8 m)
- Draft: 10 ft 9 in (3.28 m)
- Speed: 18 knots (33 km/h; 21 mph)
- Complement: 100
- Armament: 1 × 3"/50 caliber gun; 2 × 40 mm guns; 2 × 20 mm guns; 2 × Depth charge tracks

HMS Strenuous (J338) was a Catherine-class minesweeper of the Royal Navy during the Second World War. Originally planned as USS Vital (AM-129), of the United States Navy's Auk class, she was transferred to the United Kingdom under Lend-Lease.

== Career ==
Vital was laid down on 1 January 1942 at Chickasaw, Alabama, by the Gulf Shipbuilding Corp.; launched on 7 September 1942; sponsored by Miss E. Herrmann; and completed on 18 May 1943. Turned over to the Royal Navy under provisions of the lend-lease agreement, Vital was renamed HMS Strenuous (J.338), and subsequently served in the Royal Navy for the duration of World War II.

Returned to the United States Government after the war, on 10 December 1946, the ship resumed her former classification, AM-129, but not her former name. She was carried on the Naval Vessel Register as USS Strenuous (AM-129), and in the 1 January 1947 edition of the Naval Vessel Register merely as AM-129. She was declared surplus on 23 April 1947 and sold by the State Department's Foreign Liquidation Commission to a foreign purchaser. She served in the merchant service until she was broken up for scrap in Germany in July 1956.
