= USS Towhee =

Minesweeper of the United States Navy

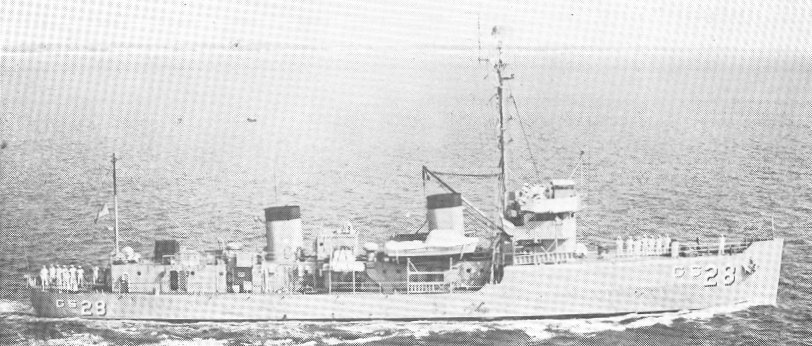

History

United States
- Name: USS Towhee
- Laid down: 21 March 1944
- Launched: 6 January 1945
- Commissioned: 18 May 1945
- Decommissioned: March 1954
- Recommissioned: 1 April 1964
- Decommissioned: 30 April 1969
- Reclassified: MSF-388, 7 February 1955; AGS-28, 1 April 1964
- Stricken: 1 May 1969
- Fate: Sold for scrapping, 6 March 1969

General characteristics
- Class & type: Auk-class minesweeper
- Displacement: 890 long tons (904 t)
- Length: 221 ft 3 in (67.44 m)
- Beam: 32 ft (9.8 m)
- Draft: 10 ft 9 in (3.28 m)
- Speed: 18 knots (33 km/h; 21 mph)
- Complement: 100 officers and enlisted
- Armament: 1 × 3"/50 caliber gun; 2 × 40 mm guns; 2 × 20 mm guns; 2 × Depth charge tracks

USS Towhee (AM-388) was an Auk-class minesweeper acquired by the United States Navy for the dangerous task of removing mines from minefields laid in the water to prevent ships from passing.

Towhee was named after the Towhee, a North American bird of the sparrow family.

Towhee was laid down on 21 March 1944 at Cleveland, Ohio, by the American Ship Building Company; launched on 6 January 1945; sponsored by Mrs. C. E. Connors; and commissioned on 18 May 1945.

== Shakedown voyage ==
Towhee departed Cleveland, Ohio, on 26 May, bound for the Massachusetts coast, via the Canadian ports of Montreal and Halifax, Nova Scotia, and arrived at Boston, Massachusetts, on 10 June. The minesweeper remained at this port through 23 July, undergoing a major overhaul, before proceeding to Little Creek, Virginia, for a continuation of overhaul and shakedown.

== Pacific Ocean operations ==
Leaving the Norfolk area on 21 September, Towhee headed south for Panama, transited the Panama Canal, and joined the Pacific Fleet on 30 September. A short availability at Craig Shipyard, San Pedro, California, in October prepared the ship for her departure from the west coast; and she got underway for Pearl Harbor on 3 November and arrived eight days later. On the 21st, the minesweeper departed the Hawaiian Islands, but an engineering casualty on the following day forced her return to Pearl Harbor.

After spending a month under repair, Towhee again sailed for Japan on 28 December and proceeded via Eniwetok, Saipan, Guam, and Samar in the Philippines. Escorting YMS's, the minesweeper reached Sasebo on 1 February 1946 and commenced a short availability alongside Nereus (AS-17) for voyage repairs. Departing Sasebo for Saishu To, she spent one week in those waters and then shifted her operations to Tsushima before returning to Sasebo. Assigned as flagship, Task Unit 96.6.2, she participated in part of the gigantic minesweeping operations designed to clear the waters around the Japanese home islands of mines sown during the war and commenced her sweeps in Tsushima Strait on 17 March.

== East Coast operations ==
After a month of operations, Towhee departed Sasebo on 22 April, bound for the west coast, via Eniwetok and Pearl Harbor.

Towhee stood into San Diego, California, on 20 May before proceeding on to transit the Panama Canal on 9 June and rejoin the Atlantic Fleet. After a two-day layover at Coco Solo, Panama Canal Zone, the minesweeper got underway north and arrived at Charleston, South Carolina, on 17 June.

Towhee remained on active duty with the Atlantic Fleet through 1953.

== Decommissioning ==
Towhee was decommissioned and laid up at Orange, Texas, in March 1954. On 7 February 1955, a fleet-wide redesignation of minecraft resulted in Towhee being redesignated as MSF-388. The minesweeper remained inactive through November 1963.

== Reactivation as Oceanographic Survey Ship ==
In December of that year, the ship proceeded to the Philadelphia Naval Shipyard, Pennsylvania, for activation and conversion to an oceanographic survey ship to replace Requisite (AGS-18) that was decommissioned and eventually scrapped. She was recommissioned on 1 April 1964 and redesignated as survey ship USS Towhee (AGS-28).

== East Coast survey operations ==
Assigned to Service Force, Atlantic Fleet, and homeported in Norfolk, Virginia, the ship completed underway training by July at Guantanamo Bay, Cuba.

Towhee then commenced a series of five oceanographic survey operations through the summer of 1965 before assisting in builder's trials for a nuclear submarine in the late summer. Navigational difficulties caused a premature return from the ship's sixth survey operation in late October, necessitating a tender availability alongside Cadmus (AR-14) before the survey ship departed Norfolk on 6 December and deployed once more for survey operations in the western Atlantic Ocean. The ship remained with the Atlantic Fleet through May 1966, when she underwent a tender availability alongside Amphion (AR-13) to prepare for shifting her operations back to the Pacific Upon completion of the tender availability, Towhee entered the Norfolk Naval Shipyard for installation of new communications equipment and air conditioning.

== Pacific Ocean survey operations ==
She departed the shipyard on 1 July and the Norfolk, Virginia area six days later, bound for Pearl Harbor. After stopovers at the Panama Canal Zone and at Mazatlán, Mexico, Towhee made port at Pearl Harbor on 12 August.Assigned to ServRon 5, the oceanographic survey vessel underwent voyage repairs soon after arriving in Hawaiian waters and continued availability through September. From 18 October to 5 November, the ship conducted underway training operations and refresher training. On 9 November, the ship got underway for her first Far Eastern deployment.

After layovers at Guam in the Marianas and at Subic Bay in the Philippines, Towhee dropped anchor in Touraine Bay, off Da Nang, South Vietnam, on 9 December. Survey operations conducted between the time of her arrival and her departure on 12 January 1967 were frequently hampered by gale winds and high seas. The ship subsequently returned, via Subic Bay and Guam, to Hawaiian waters and reached Pearl Harbor on 6 February. Following a survey in the vicinity of Midway Island, the ship entered the naval shipyard at Pearl Harbor for 10 days of upkeep. Towhee then conducted underway training prior to entering ARD-SO for routine pre-deployment underwater hull inspection.

== Second WestPac deployment ==
On 18 September, Towhee departed Pearl Harbor, bound for the ship's second WestPac deployment, and stopped briefly at Guam en route to the Gulf of Thailand. Arriving off the western coast of Vietnam for survey operations during the latter part of October, Towhee's operations continued into December, when she made a visit to Bangkok, Thailand, over Christmas 1967.

Towhee headed for Hawaii in April and conducted local operations in the Hawaiian area until 25 November 1968, when the survey ship headed for the west coast.

Towhee underwent a material inspection on 19 and 20 March 1969 at the conclusion of her west coast deployment, and the surveying board found the ship unfit for further service.

== Decommissioning ==
Towhee was decommissioned on 30 April 1969, and custody was transferred to the Inactive Ship Facility at Vallejo, California On 1 May Towhee was struck from the Navy List and sold to the Learner Co. of Oakland, California, on 6 March for scrapping.
