= USS Frolic =

USS Frolic is a name used more than once by the United States Navy, and may refer to:

- USS Frolic (1813), a sloop of war in active service during 1814 until captured by the British during the War of 1812
- USS Frolic, a side wheel steamer in commission as USS Advance from 1864 to 1865 and as USS Frolic from 1865 to 1869, from 1869 to 1870, from 1872 to 1874, and from 1875 to 1877
- USS Frolic (1892), a patrol yacht in commission in 1898, from 1900 to 1906, and from 1906 to 1907
- USS Frolic (SP-1336), a schooner in non-commissioned service from 1917 to 1918
