= USS Champion (AM-314) =

Minesweeper of the United States Navy

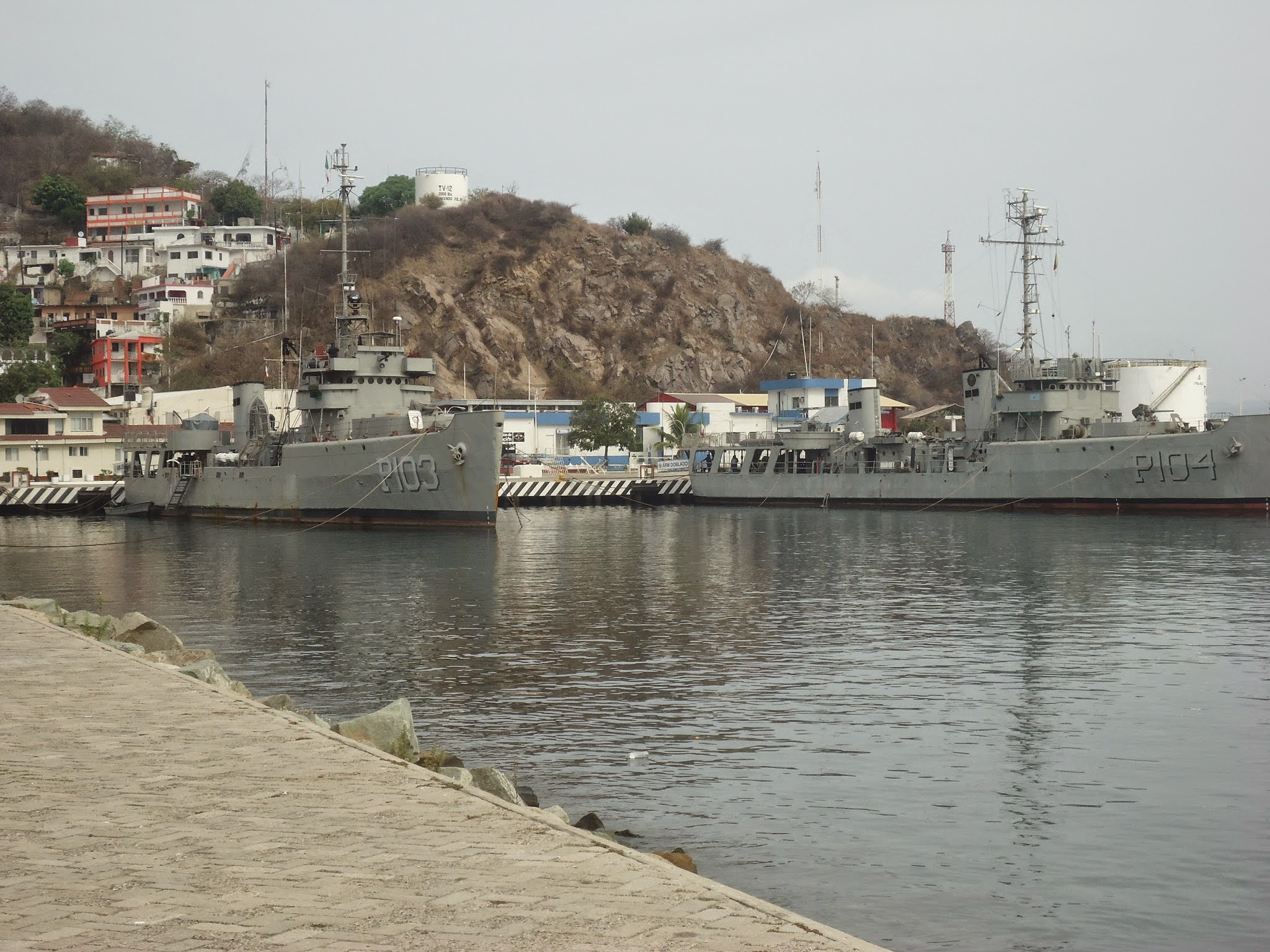
- ARM Mariano Escobedo (left) in Manzanillo

History

United States
- Name: HMS Akbar (BAM-1)
- Builder: General Engineering & Dry Dock Company, Alameda, California
- Laid down: 6 July 1942
- Launched: 12 December 1942
- Commissioned: 8 September 1943
- Decommissioned: 30 January 1947
- Renamed: USS Champion (AM-314), 23 January 1943
- Reclassified: MSF-314, 7 February 1955
- Honours and awards: 3 battle stars (World War II)
- Fate: Sold to Mexico, 19 September 1972

Mexico
- Name: ARM Mariano Escobedo (C72)
- Namesake: Mariano Escobedo
- Acquired: 19 September 1972
- Reclassified: G03; P103, 1993
- Status: in active service, as of 2007

General characteristics
- Class & type: Auk-class minesweeper
- Displacement: 890 long tons (904 t)
- Length: 221 ft 3 in (67.44 m)
- Beam: 32 ft (9.8 m)
- Draft: 10 ft 9 in (3.28 m)
- Speed: 18 knots (33 km/h; 21 mph)
- Complement: 100 officers and enlisted
- Armament: 1 × 3"/50 caliber gun; 2 × 40 mm guns; 2 × 20 mm guns; 2 × Depth charge tracks

The third USS Champion (BAM-1/AM-314/MSF-314) was an Auk-class minesweeper of the United States Navy.

The ship was the first of 32 vessels of the Auk class ordered for transfer to Great Britain under Lend-Lease, and designated British Minesweeper HMS Akbar (BAM-1). Twelve of these ships were retained for service in the U.S. Navy.

Launched on 12 December 1942 by General Engineering & Dry Dock Company, Alameda, California; redesignated USS Champion (AM-314) on 23 January 1943, and commissioned on 8 September 1943.

== World War II Pacific operations ==
Clearing San Diego, California, 7 December 1943, Champion arrived at Pearl Harbor 13 December. Between 8 January and 4 March 1944, she was assigned the task of guarding vital shipping between Pearl Harbor and San Francisco, California. More direct support to frontline operations came from 18 March to 10 April, when she escorted two resupply convoys to Tarawa, after which she screened a convoy to Kwajalein from 19 April to 7 May in support of the Marshalls operation. After a short overhaul, she sailed to Saipan for minesweeping operations and local escort duty in late June, then returned to Pearl Harbor for more extensive overhaul. From 13 September to 17 November, she guarded convoys from Pearl Harbor to Eniwetok and Saipan, before training for the Iwo Jima operation.

== Iwo Jima operations ==
Champion arrived off Iwo Jima on 16 February 1945, as the preliminary three-day bombardment of the island began. Except for the period 21 February to 4 March, when she sailed escorting unloaded assault shipping to Saipan, from which she returned with resupply echelons, Champion remained off Iwo Jima until 7 March. After provisioning and fueling at Ulithi, she sailed for Kerama Retto and Okinawa. In these dangerous waters she conducted minesweeping operations, and served in screens, from 24 March to 19 June, aside from a convoy escort voyage to Saipan from 25 April to 19 May.

== Damaged by a kamikaze ==
On 16 April, a kamikaze suicide plane crashed close aboard Champion, spraying debris which slightly damaged her, and wounded four of her men. She returned to Seattle, Washington, 20 July for an overhaul which lasted through the end of the war.

== Final Far East operations ==
In support of Far Eastern occupation activities, Champion sailed from San Pedro, California on 4 December 1945, called at Pearl Harbor and Eniwetok, and arrived at Sasebo, Japan on 1 February 1946. From this port she swept mines and patrolled in Tsushima Straits until 6 December, when she cleared for the U.S. West Coast.

== Decommissioning ==
Champion was decommissioned and placed in reserve at San Diego, California on 30 January 1947. She was reclassified MSF-314 on 7 February 1955. She was transferred to Mexico on 19 September 1972 as Mariano Escobedo (C72), reclassified G03, and P103 in 1993. As of 2007, Mariano Escobedo was active in the Mexican Navy.

== Awards ==
Champion received three battle stars for service in World War II.
