= Savannah Machine & Foundry =

Shipbuilding company

The Savannah Machine & Foundry Company was an American shipbuilder in Savannah, Georgia, founded in 1912. Walter Lee Mingledorf was the founder of the company. It was sold in 1968 to Aegis Corporation.

It built a series of Auk-class and Admirable-class minesweepers for the U.S. Navy and salvage ships.
