= USS Tanager (AM-385) =

Minesweeper of the United States Navy

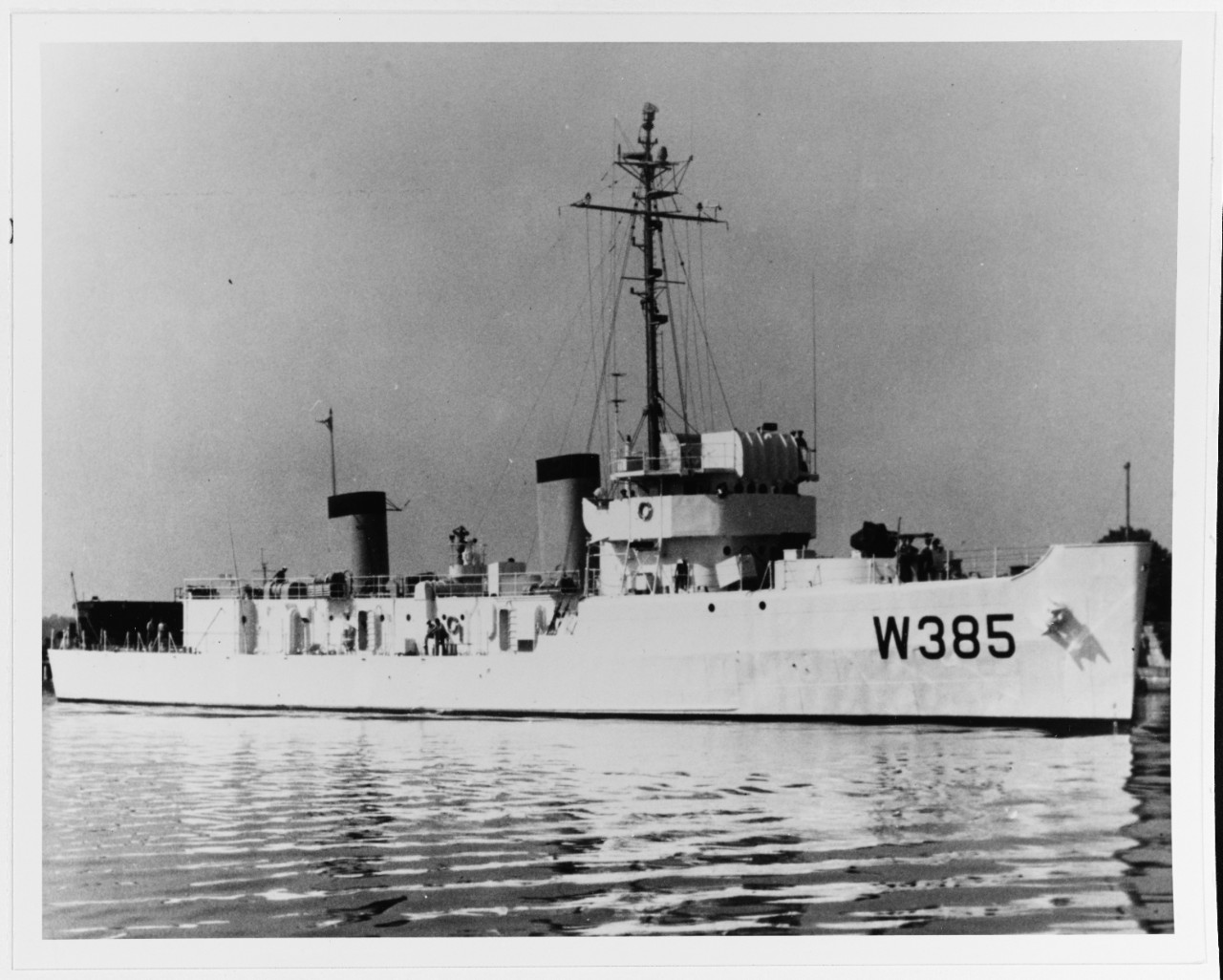
- USCGC Tanager photographed in 1964

History

United States
- Name: USS Tanager
- Builder: American Ship Building Company, Lorain, Ohio
- Laid down: 29 March 1944
- Launched: 9 December 1944
- Commissioned: 28 July 1945
- Decommissioned: 10 December 1954
- Reclassified: MSF-385, 7 February 1955
- Stricken: 1 November 1963
- Fate: Transferred to the U.S. Coast Guard, 16 July 1964
- Name: USCGS Tanager (WTR-885)
- Acquired: 16 July 1964
- Decommissioned: 1 February 1972
- Fate: Sold for scrap, 15 November 1972

General characteristics
- Class & type: Auk-class minesweeper
- Displacement: 890 long tons (904 t)
- Length: 221 ft 3 in (67.44 m)
- Beam: 32 ft (9.8 m)
- Draft: 10 ft 9 in (3.28 m)
- Speed: 18 knots (33 km/h; 21 mph)
- Complement: 100 officers and enlisted
- Armament: 1 × 3"/50 caliber gun; 2 × 40 mm guns; 2 × 20 mm guns; 2 × Depth charge tracks

USS Tanager (AM-385) was an Auk-class minesweeper acquired by the United States Navy for the dangerous task of removing mines from minefields laid in the water to prevent ships from passing.

Tanager was named after the tanager, any of the numerous American, passerine birds. The brightly colored males are unmusical and inhabit woodlands.

Tanager, a minesweeper and the second United States Navy warship with that name, was laid down at Lorain, Ohio, on 29 March 1944 by the American Ship Building Company; launched on 9 December 1944; sponsored by Mrs. Thomas Slingluff; and commissioned on 28 July 1945.

== Operations with the 2nd Fleet ==
Tanager steamed via the St. Lawrence River to Boston, Massachusetts, in late July and early August. In October, she moved south to the Naval Amphibious Base at Little Creek, Virginia, for shakedown training and mine-sweeping exercises in the Chesapeake Bay area. For almost six years, Tanager operated with the U.S. 2nd Fleet along the eastern seaboard and in the Caribbean area. She conducted minesweeping exercises and supported the training efforts of the Mine Warfare School at Yorktown, Virginia. On three occasions — once each in 1948, 1950, and 1951 — she did tours of duty with the Naval Mine Countermeasures Station, located at Panama City, Florida.

== Operations with the 6th Fleet ==
On 2 September 1951, she departed Charleston, South Carolina, for the Mediterranean Sea. While she was deployed with the U.S. 6th Fleet, she conducted more minesweeping exercises and visited many of the famous ports in the area. Among those were Mers-el-Kebir, Gibraltar, Naples, Monaco, Cannes, Venice, Malta, and Genoa.

== Second Mediterranean tour of duty ==
In February 1952, Tanager returned to Charleston and resumed operations with the 2nd Fleet. After repairs at Charleston and a voyage to Norfolk, Virginia, and back, the minesweeper began her second Mediterranean deployment in April 1953. During that cruise, she added some new ports-of-call to her itinerary, notably Tangier, Palermo, Marseille, Livorno, Thessaloniki and Seville. She also participated in a number of minesweeping exercises with other units of the 6th Fleet. Tanager re-entered Charleston on 26 October 1953.

== First decommissioning ==
Following minesweeping exercises along the southeastern coast of the United States and in the Caribbean, she entered the yard at Savannah Machine & Foundry Co. on 29 June 1954 for repairs. On 23 September, the minesweeper departed Savannah, Georgia, and headed for Beaumont, Texas. She arrived on the 28th and entered the drydock the same day. She was refloated on 8 October and towed to the naval station at Orange, Texas. Two months later, on 10 December 1954, Tanager was decommissioned and berthed there with the Atlantic Reserve Fleet. On 7 February 1955, the minesweeper was redesignated MSF-385.

== Transfer to the U.S. Coast Guard ==
On 4 October 1963, Tanager was transferred to the U.S. Coast Guard for use as a training cutter. Her name was struck from the Navy list on 1 November 1963, and she was commissioned in the Coast Guard as Tanager (WTR-885) on 16 July 1964.

== Decommissioning, sale and demise ==
She was decommissioned once more on 1 February 1972; and, on 15 November, she was sold to Mr. William A. Hardesty of Seattle, Washington. She served several decades more as the yacht Eagle. An effort to convert it into a latter day Calypso-style research ship failed and she ended her days, like the recently scrapped S S Catalina, in Ensenada, Mexico.

== Film productions ==
The Tanager was used in the filming of the motion pictures The Usual Suspects and Hitman's Run in 2001, as well as the television show Buffy the Vampire Slayer
