= MinRon =

United States Navy terminology

MinRon is a standard U.S. Navy abbreviation for "Minesweeper Squadron."

The Commander of a Minesweeper Squadron is known, in official Navy communications, as COMMINRON (followed by a number), such as COMMINRON FOUR.

== Mine Groups ==
A MinGru or MINGRU is a standard U.S. Navy abbreviation or acronym for "minesweeper group."

The Commander of a Minesweeper Group is known, in official Navy communications, as COMMINGRU (followed by a number), such as COMMINGRU TWO.
