= Blockade of Wonsan =

1951-53 siege during Korean War

- Part of the Korean War
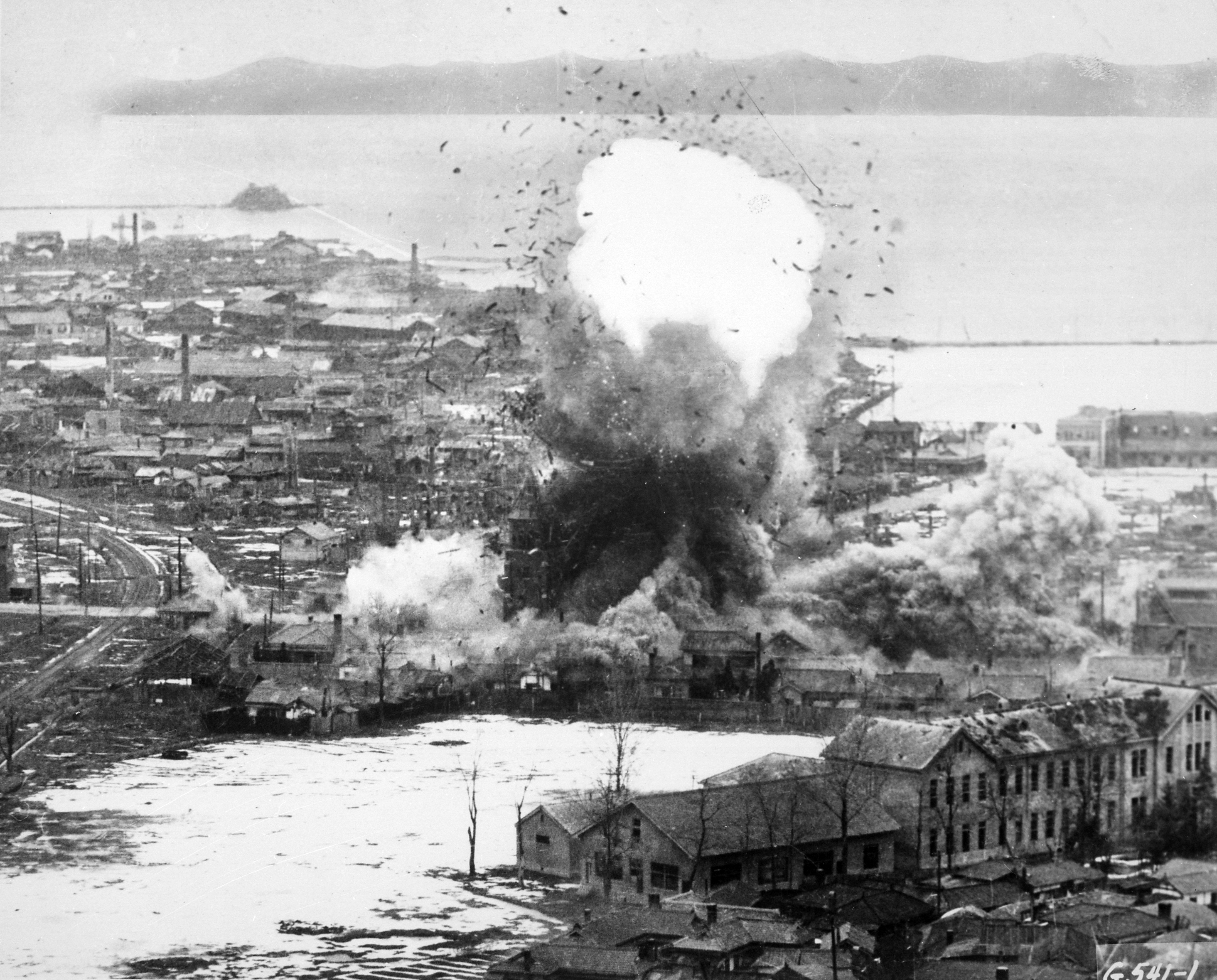
- An explosion destroys North Korean supplies during the blockade of Wonsan.
| Date | February 16, 1951 – July 27, 1953 (2 years, 5 months and 11 days) |
| Location | Wonsan, North Korea, Sea of Japan 39°09′N 127°26′E |
| Result | United Nations victory; successful blockade of Wonsan |

Belligerents
| United Nations: United States; South Korea; United Kingdom | North Korea; China |

Commanders and leaders
| James Henry Doyle | |

Casualties and losses
| 41 killed 158 wounded 1 patrol boat sunk 2 minesweepers sunk 1 battleship damaged 2 cruisers damaged 16 destroyers damaged 3 frigates damaged 5 minesweepers damaged 1 LSD damaged 3 LSMRs damaged | Unknown |
- Many of the damaged American warships were struck more than once on different occasions.

The blockade of Wonsan, or the siege of Wonsan, from February 16, 1951, to July 27, 1953, during the Korean War, was the longest naval blockade in modern history, lasting 861 days. United Nations naval forces, primarily from the United States, kept the strategically important city of Wonsan from being used by the North Korean Navy.

The blockade diverted communist troops from the front line. North Korean artillery fired at the American fleet was mostly ineffective, and the city was heavily damaged by UN naval aircraft and warships.

== Background ==
=== Operation Wonsan ===
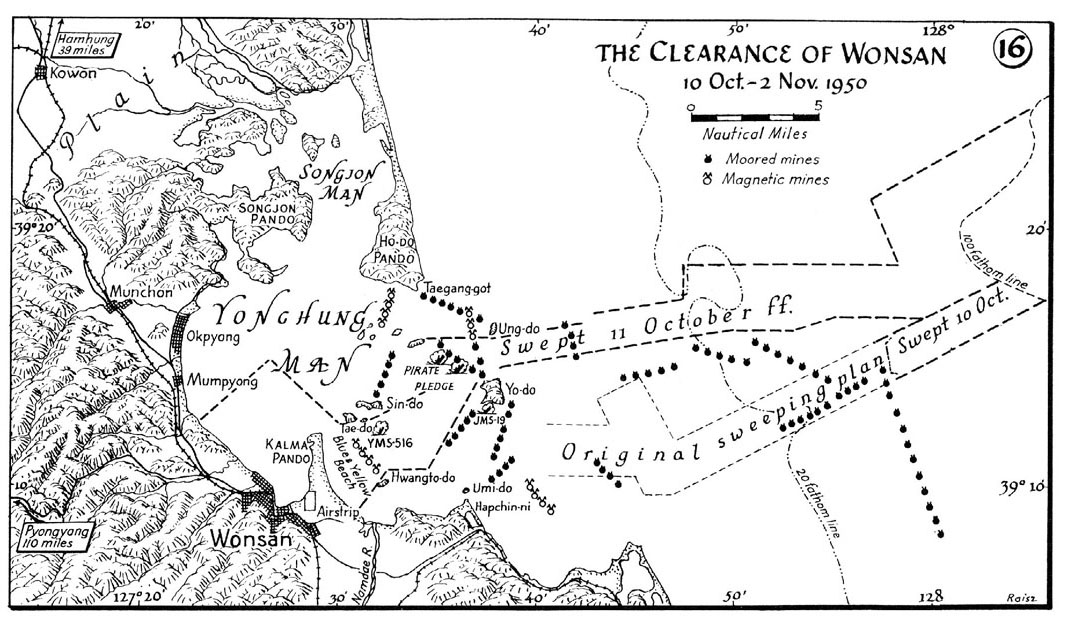
A battle map of Operation Wonsan

Wonsan was a strategic point during the war, located on North Korea's southeastern coast with a large harbor, an airfield, a petroleum refinery, 75,000 people, and as many as 80,000 troops, including several artillery batteries. After the Battle of Inchon, in which General Douglas MacArthur landed on the northwestern shores of the Korean Peninsula, he ordered X Corps to make a landing at Wonsan where they would proceed west, link up with the Eighth Army and then advance towards Pyongyang, the capital of North Korea.

North Korean naval forces had been well supplied by the Soviet Union and China with all sorts of sea mines, which were used as much as possible to defend Wonsan. Soviet military advisors were also employed to create more effective mine fields. One of the first objectives of the operation was to begin plotting the locations of mines and then destroy them. That made the use of minesweepers necessary, and dozens would eventually serve in the blockade. Operation Wonsan, or the Clearance of Wonsan, began on October 10 of 1950, ten days before the landing was scheduled to take place. Rear Admiral James H. Doyle commanded Task Force 90, a fleet of dozens of American warships which were used in the clearance.

Two days later on October 12, mines sank the sweepers USS Pledge and USS Pirate, killing twelve men and wounding dozens of others, all while under accurate fire from North Korean shore batteries. The United States Navy Pacific Fleet responded by starting the production of new minesweepers in the largest shipbuilding program since World War II. Other vessels were damaged by mines and battery fire as well but the loss of the Pirate and Pledge proved to be the major engagement during the operation.

=== Operation Tailboard ===
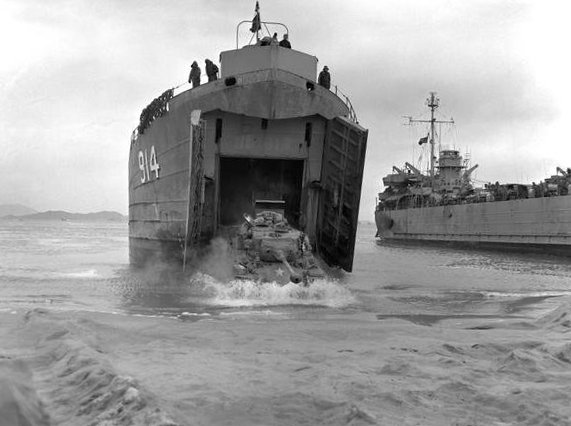
A US M46 Patton tank disembarks from a Landing Ship Tank, Wonsan (2 November 1950)

Operation Tailboard was the codename for the United States Army landing at Wonsan, and it was found to have been unnecessary. Preparations began over 800 miles away at Inchon where on October 15, thousands of marines and soldiers, 30,184 in total, embarked transports to participate in the landing. When they arrived off Wonsan on October 20, the clearance of the mine fields was still taking place so for five days X Corps and the 1st Marine Division were forced to remain on ship to wait for a clear path to the beaches.

When it came time to land on October 25, the North Koreans had already withdrawn and the British and South Koreans were securing the area. Ultimately the landing was not needed and MacArthur was criticized for not using the X Corps in the pursuit of the retreating North Korean Army on the Inchon front. On October 19, the South Korean Army captured Pyongyang so instead of heading there the American army went north along the coast to occupy Hungnam and the Chosin Reservoir areas while the 3rd Infantry Division landed at Wonsan in November as reinforcements.

=== Evacuation of Wonsan ===
UN forces would not hold Wonsan for long: after the massive Chinese intervention in the war, Allied forces were ordered to evacuate Wonsan on December 9, 1950, taking 7,009 refugees, 3,384 military personnel, 1,146 vehicles and 10,013 tons of cargo in the process. General MacArthur's plan was to regroup in Japan before launching another offensive, while holding the Pusan Perimeter. When the North Koreans and Chinese recaptured the city, defenses were rebuilt in a more formidable way, additional sea mines were deployed and new artillery batteries were erected.

== Blockade ==
=== Opening engagements ===
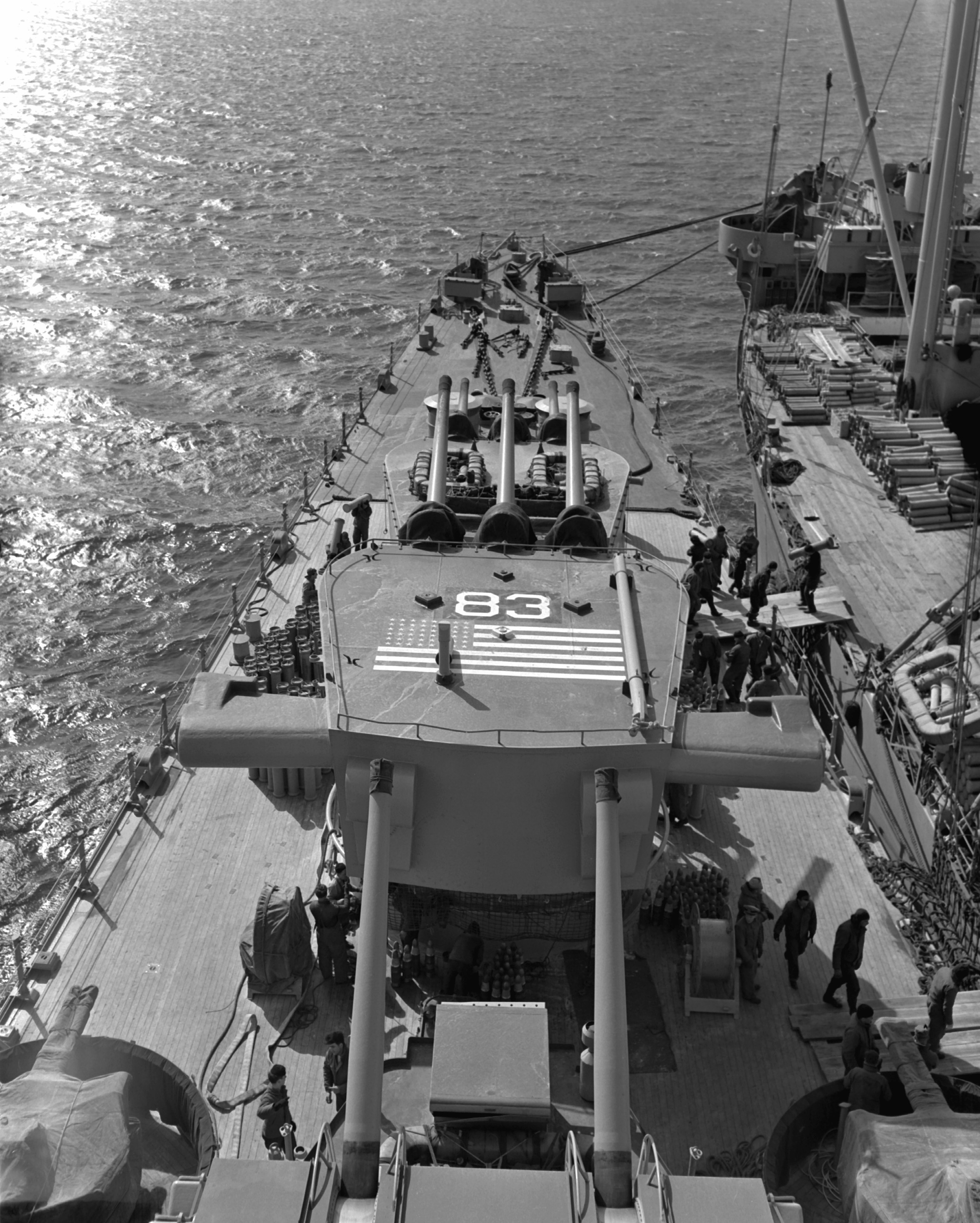
USS Manchester alongside USS Mount Katmai in Wonsan Harbor.

The blockade began on February 16, 1951, and would last 861 days until the signing of the armistice in July 1953. Throughout the blockade, United States Navy ships and aircraft engaged shore batteries repeatedly. Several American vessels were damaged by land based artillery fire though none were destroyed. UN Task Group 95.2 was assigned to the blockade and they first bombarded Wonsan on February 17, 1951, targeting everything used by the communists and causing heavy damage.

On February 19, the destroyer USS Ozbourn, under Commander Charles O. Akers, was fired on by shore batteries in the Wonsan area. She received two direct hits and several near misses and successfully rescued a downed pilot from USS Valley Forge with a motor boat, while he was adrift in a mine field. The boat officer of the boat received a Bronze Star for the rescue. Ozbourn eventually returned to San Diego in April 1951 for repairs and later sailed back to North Korea.

On February 24, the undefended island of Sindo-ri, in Wonsan Harbor, was captured by South Korean marines supported by two American destroyers and two frigates. Wonsan shore batteries also dueled with UN warships on March 3, but there were no recorded hits. The battleship USS New Jersey participated in her first shore bombardment mission of the war on May 20, 1951. While patrolling off Wonsan, North Korean batteries opened fire and she was struck by one shell. Slightly damaged, she sustained one man killed and two wounded, her only casualties during the war. Another shot was a near miss and passed over New Jersey from aft to port. She then responded by bombarding the enemy position until they were silenced. The type of warfare experienced at Wonsan would last throughout the war.

=== Operation Fireball ===
Operation Fireball was the code name for a bombardment of the Wonsan area from May through September. It involved the joint deployment of naval and aerial assets from the 5th Air Force which caused heavy damage to the North Koreans. On the night of May 21 and May 22, during the height of the fighting, two American LSMRs, supported by light cruisers and destroyers, fired 4,903 rockets in thirty-five minutes, further damaging the defenses of the city. UN carrier aircraft were used to fire flares while the warships focused on gunnery.

It was the first time LSMRs would be deployed in the siege of Wonsan and over time would cause heavy casualties to the North Korean garrison. Between June and September the LSMRs would discharge a total of 12,924 5-inch rockets. During the operation, the destroyer USS Brinkley Bass was slightly damaged while engaging a battery, she sustained eight casualties in the action.

=== Action off Rei-To ===
On May 24, the UN station ship at Wonsan detected several small craft southeast of Rei-To Island. In a one sided night engagement, the light cruiser USS Manchester and the destroyer USS Brinkley Bass used radar to direct their fire and broke the enemy formation. Four sampans were recovered the following day along with the bodies of eleven enemies, one other wounded North Korean was taken prisoner and the sampans were found to have been converted to minelayers, with four M-26 mines each.

=== USS Walke incident ===
USS Walke was a destroyer, under Captain Marshall Thompson, of Task Force 77 (TF-77) which was by now assigned to naval operations in the Wonsan area. On June 12, 1951, Walke was about 60 miles off the coast of North Korea, at position 38°52′N 129°25′E, when she was struck either by a torpedo or a floating sea mine which had separated from a field. The resulting explosion severely damaged Walke's hull on her port side and 26 men were killed and 40 others wounded. Many of the casualties were blown over the side and into the water when the explosion occurred and it took a long time before all of them could be recovered. The event was the deadliest suffered by the US Navy during the Korean War.

Shortly thereafter, sailors on the nearby destroyers USS Harry E. Hubbard and USS Bradford spotted an oil slick off of Walke's starboard side so they began dropping depth charges on what they reported as being two submarines. The chase was eventually discontinued and the damage to Walke was temporarily repaired and she made for Japan. A later investigation of the incident recovered a small metal disk from the damaged ship and when analyzed it was concluded to have been part of a torpedo detonator. Walke was later repaired and returned to Korean waters the following year.

=== Battle of the Buzz Saw ===
The Battle of the Buzz Saw, as United States Navy personnel called it, was North Korea's response to the UN's attacks on Wonsan. After causing heavy damage to North Korean forces within the previous months, the situation escalated as the communists started utilizing new weapons to lift the blockade. On July 6, 1951, the United States launched another naval bombardment of the area, causing high casualties and tempting the North Koreans to retaliate with an especially heavy bombardment on July 17, 1951.

For four and a half hours the destroyers USS O'Brien, USS Blue and USS Alfred A. Cunningham engaged the batteries at Wonsan, firing 2,336 rounds of 5-inch shells. The North Koreans offered heavy resistance, and over 500 splashes were counted, but there was no serious damage to the American vessels. The next day USS Frank E. Evans engaged the batteries and received four near misses, wounding four men aboard the ship.

=== Operation Kickoff ===
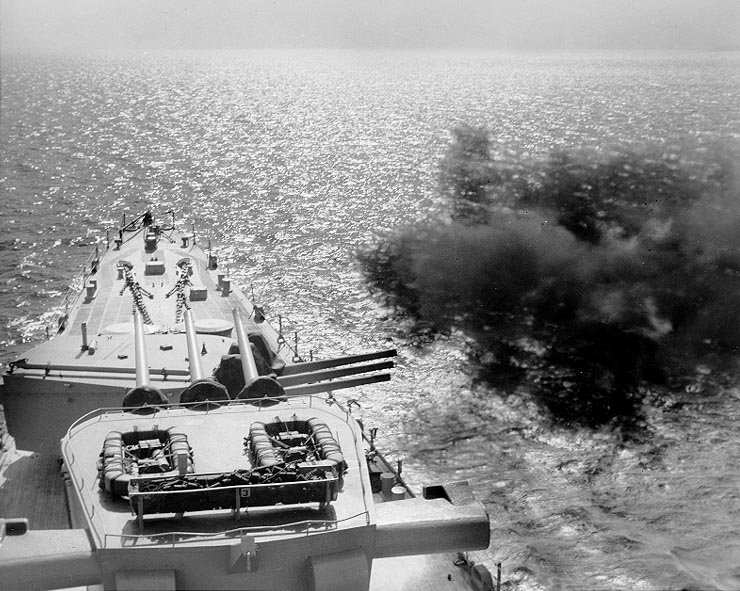
USS Manchester firing her 6-inch guns at the Korean coast.

Between late June through August 1951, North Korean attacks on American ships seemed to increase so the United States began concentrating on destroying enemy batteries. On June 28, the destroyer USS Henry W. Tucker received counter-battery fire while conducting a bombardment of Wonsan Harbor. She was struck by one round, causing light superficial damage and one man was injured.

A few days later on July 3, the frigate USS Everett was attacked by the batteries and took hits, killing one man and wounding seven others. The Americans responded with an attack by the Fast Carrier Task Force. In one day 247 bombing sorties were carried out against Wonsan and 600 South Korean marines raided the mainland from the island of Cho-do.

On July 6, the destroyer USS Frank E. Evans landed men on the island of Hwangto-do and then with two other destroyers, bombarded buildings and a torpedo station. USS Blue captured Kukto Island the following day and established an observation point to keep watch on North Korean positions. On July 11, in the vicinity of Yo-do island, USS Blue and Frank E. Evans were attacked, approximately fifty splashes were counted near the ships but none of them were hit. Due to the attacks, particularly the Battle of the Buzz Saw, American naval commanders decided on launching Operation Kickoff which referred to maneuvers within Wonsan Harbor, aimed at reducing the batteries.

Every day from July 17, 1951, elements of the allied fleet, assigned to bombardment groups, would sail at 5 knots (9.3 km/h) to bombard known enemy positions and continue doing so from 3:00 pm until dark. On the first day of the maneuvers, the LSMRs USS Clarion River and USS LSMR-525 received heavy, accurate fire from enemy batteries on the islands of Kalmagak, Umi-do and Ho-do Pan-do. Both of the vessels were struck by shells and damaged, but not seriously. Over 500 shells splashed in the water around USS O'Brien and she sustained at least a couple of hits. One man was injured although the damage was light. USS New Jersey and heavy cruiser USS Helena also participated in the bombardment.

On August 4, British Royal Marines installed mortars on Hwangto-do to counter the North Korean shore batteries and on August 11, USS Hopewell, using shore fire control parties, fired direct and indirect fire missions against enemy troop concentrations and transportation targets in the Wonsan area. The minesweepers USS Dextrous, USS Heron and USS Redstart came under fire by shore batteries that same day while conducting check sweep operations in the vicinity of Hodo-pando. Dextrous suffered two direct hits; killing one man, three wounded and moderate damage.

With the exception of an attack on USS Uhlmann on August 20, Operation Kickoff proved to be a success as the number of attacks on blockading ships decreased for a while until new batteries were constructed. Seven enemy guns opened fire on Uhlmann that day and after a long engagement, five of the guns were destroyed and 117 splashes were counted by the sailors, but there were no hits. Uhlmann had to break off the attack without silencing the remaining two artillery pieces because allied patrols entered the area.

=== Renewed minesweeping operations ===
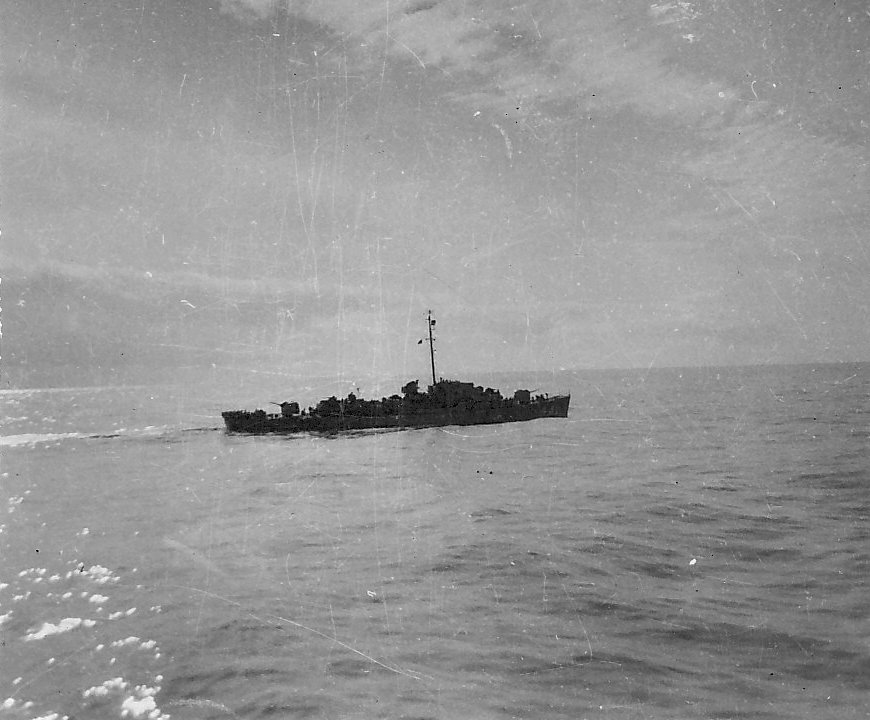
USS William Seiverling off Korea in 1951

Because the communists were still mining the approaches of Wonsan and Hungnam, on September 5 the commander of CTF-95 ordered the minesweeping group CTG-95.6 to sweep the coastline so as to allow UN ships to remain within gunfire range of the shore at all times while blockading. Upon completion, allied warships no longer had to withdraw out of range each night. While supporting the minesweepers involved in the mission, the destroyer escort USS William Seiverling was hit three times on September 8 by ground-based artillery. Her fire room flooded but there were no casualties.

On September 10, the minesweepers Redstart and Heron were again damaged by shell fire from Wonsan, this time while rechecking pre-swept waters. On September 20, USS Orleck bombarded enemy troops and mortar positions, scoring five hits which destroyed an ammunition dump. Orleck also attacked a large sampan, suspected of minelaying, and struck her four times with gunfire. On September 24, ROKN PF-62 was also damaged by shore battery fire. After three hits, the frigate was moderately damaged and caught on fire. Three South Korean sailors were wounded but they were able to save their ship from complete destruction.

Minesweeping operations would continue for months, the UN ships constantly swept various areas to ensure that no new mine fields were laid. Incidents of shore batteries scoring hits on allied warships also became less common and for weeks no vessels were damaged until October 29 when USS Osprey was engaged. Osprey's engine room flooded after being hit three times and communications went out, one man was seriously wounded though the ship was saved from sinking. By November 9, the minesweeping mission was eighty percent complete, accurate shore battery fire delayed the UN ships from completing the operation for a few more weeks.

=== Escalation of the naval war ===
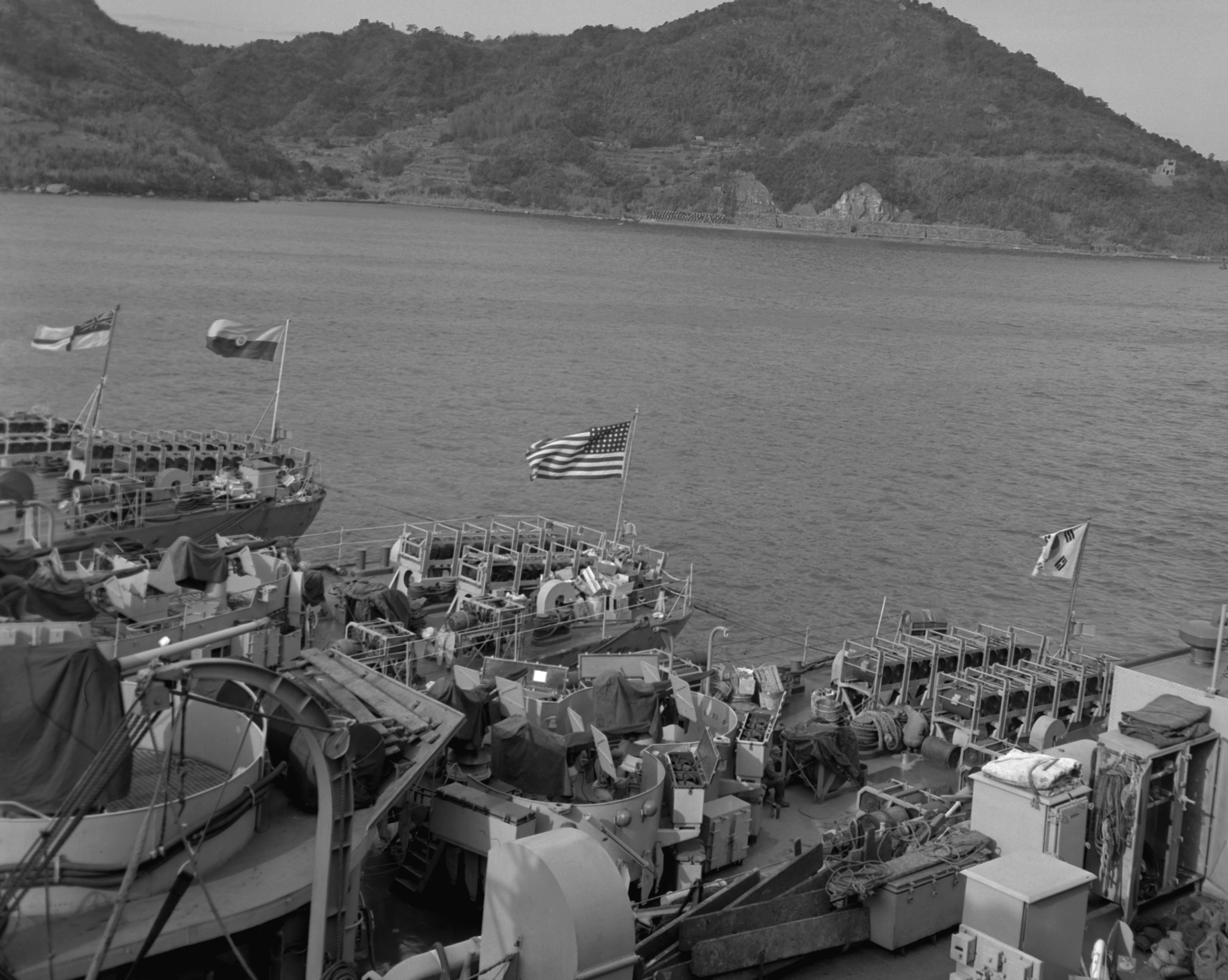
HMAS Murchison, ARC Almirante Padilla, USS Gloucester, and ROKS Taedong on the Han River in 1952

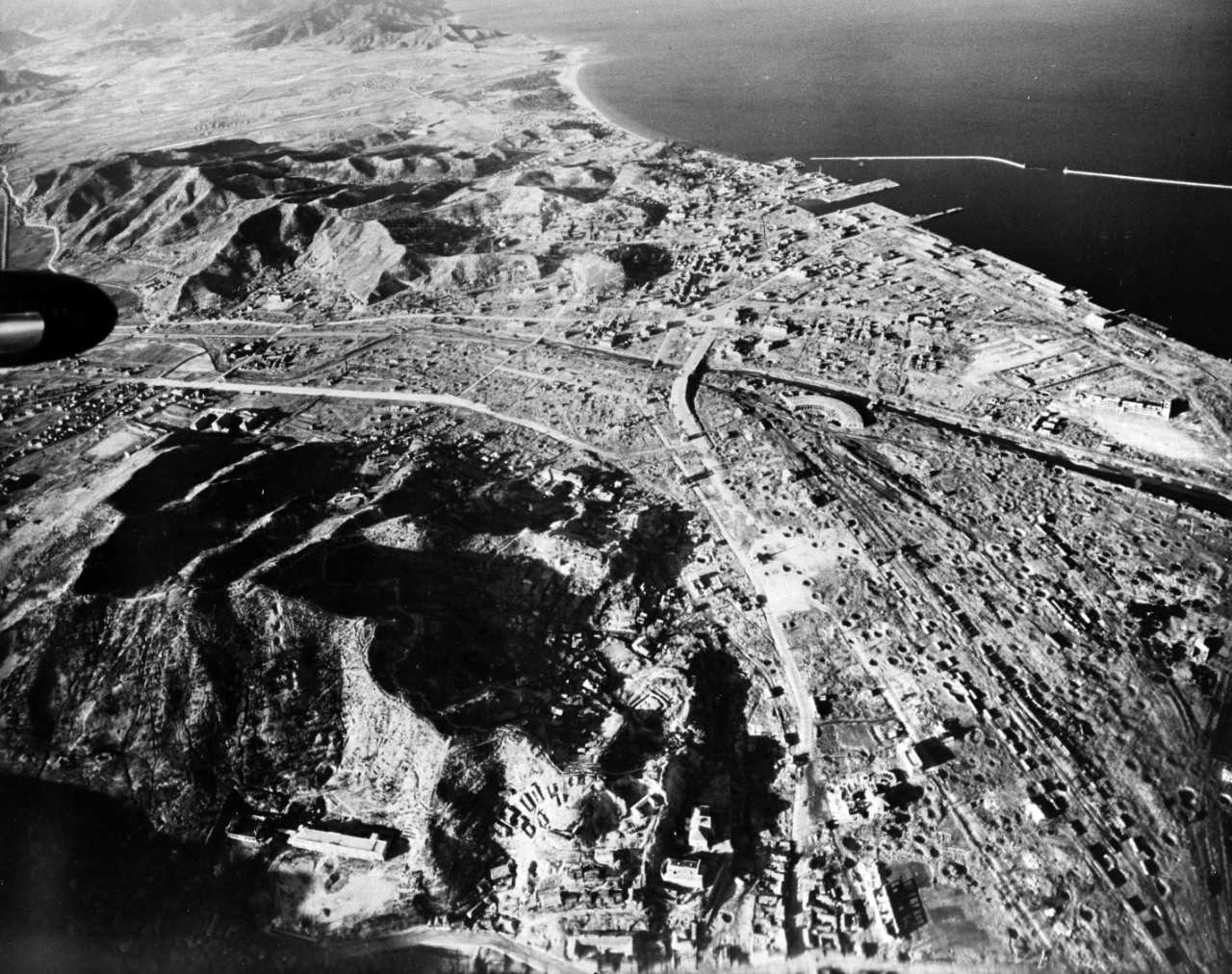
Wonsan after a year of UN bombardment, February 1952

In late 1951 and 1952 intelligence from captured or surrendered North Koreans became more frequent and reliable. The information told the United States that the enemy was building sampans for minelaying and preparing offensives against the islands around Wonsan. MiG aircraft were also being reported operating in larger numbers and would begin to threaten UN aircraft and the blockading force. North Korean Army troops, well supplied by the Soviets and the Chinese, were also conducting large artillery bombardments that demonstrated their supply of ammunition.

Shore batteries increased their effectiveness as well: with fire control being equipped and air burst rounds also starting to be used. With the minesweeping operation mostly completed, American bombardment groups began shelling the city again. USS New Jersey carried out a series of attacks at Wonsan and other nearby coastal targets from November 1 to November 6, 1951, during which she targeted the petroleum refinery at Wonsan, trains, bridges, tunnels, railroads, troop concentrations and shore batteries.

From November 22 to 24, LSR Division 31, including the LSMRs, 401, 403 and 404, conducted fire missions and on November 24 and 25, naval gunfire supported a guerrilla raid on the island of Ka-do where several North Korean prisoners were taken. On November 28 and 29, the North Koreans launched a small offensive operation. Using armed sampans, they attacked the island settlement on Hwangto-do, killing one civilian and taking five civilians prisoner. Most of the homes on the island were destroyed in the attack and the North Koreans suffered no casualties.

Another large-scale bombardment of Wonsan took place on December 20, with the battleship USS Wisconsin participating. Six days later ROKN PC-740 was lost, presumably due to striking a mine off of To-do in Wonsan Harbor.

On January 11, 1952, the next significant gunnery duel began when Redstart and Dextrous received accurate battery fire from Ho-do Pan-do while they were sailing without an escort. The fire was concentrated on Dextrous and she sustained considerable superficial damage and a loss of one man killed and two wounded. Later on, USS Gregory and USS George K. MacKenzie engaged in a one-hour duel with four 76-millimeter batteries. MacKenzie was closely straddled with thirty-six rounds but there was no damage or casualties. She also made three direct hits on the North Korean command post.

George K. MacKenzie was engaged again on January 24 from Han-do Pan-do, along with USS Marshall. Neither ship was damaged and there were no casualties. TF-77 rescued survivors from a helicopter crash on February 8, twenty-five miles outside of Wonsan. Reports from RESCAP indicated that personnel involved were captured by the enemy. By the one-year anniversary of the blockade, Wonsan was bombed on a daily basis though occasionally the UN fleet would combine their firepower for larger engagements.

On February 16, exactly one year after the blockade began, USS Gregory, USS Twining and USS Rowan attacked in the usual bombardments that would last until the end of the war. Enemy shore batteries were active on March 13, at Kalmagak, Wonsan against UN forces. Counter battery engagements by USS Manchester, USS James E. Kyes, USS McGinty and USS Douglas H. Fox, plus the help of Fast Carrier Task Force planes silenced the enemy guns. The accurate shore battery fire indicated the possible use of fire control equipment.

USS Wiltsie and Brinkley Bass engaged shore batteries at Wonsan on March 20, using shore-based spotting. Brinkley Bass scored seven direct hits on one of the batteries located near the city of Wonsan. Neither ship was struck, but Brinkley Bass received some shrapnel. March 20 marked the beginning of a four-day attack on the blockade by North Korean artillery. On May 21 USS Osprey was taken under fire by enemy shore batteries while searching for mines.

Using shore-based spotters, Osprey silenced three batteries and suffered no damage. Brinkley Bass and USS Stickell silenced a battery at Kalmagak on March 22. USS Wiltsie received fire from the batteries east of Kalmagak on March 23 and, together with Brinkley Bass, responded with counter-battery fire to silence the enemy guns. During the following day Brinkley Bass was struck again with one round from Ho-do Pan-do, wounding five men, one seriously, and causing damage to the ship's radio and electronics. On March 28 USS Burlington was fired on from Ho-do Pan-do, shots straddled the ship but evasive maneuvers prevented probable hits. Burlington responded with 123 rounds of her own and caused a small forest fire.

==== April 1952 ====
USS Leonard F. Mason experienced an explosion in her depth charge starboard detonator locker on April 1, while bombarding Ho-do Pan-do, but suffered no casualties. Wiltsie, USS McGinty, and USS Condor were also in action. USS Symbol, USS Murrelet and USS Edmonds received enemy fire near Wonsan on April 2 and again suffered no damage or casualties. The same day USS Wiltsie received ten near misses from shore batteries east of Kalmagak while providing fire support for Condor. Wiltsie was attacked a few more times within the next several days but they were all inconclusive contacts.

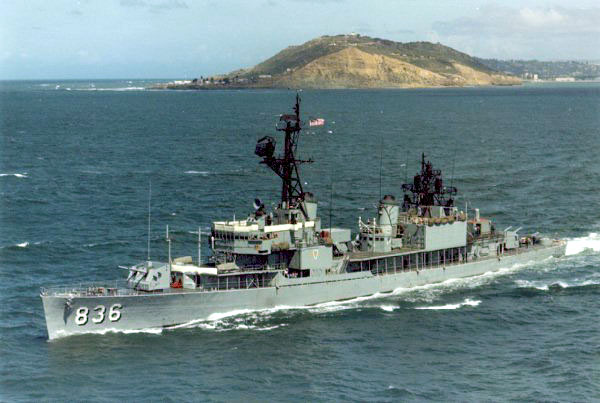
USS George K. MacKenzie

In the Wonsan area on April 10, TF-77 carried out a coordinated strike using the guns of USS Saint Paul and USS Hanson. USS Silverstein, to the north of Ho-do Pan-do, received 30 rounds of enemy fire at a range of 12,400 yards (11,300 m) with fall of shot 50 to 300 yards (46 to 274 m) from the ship but without damaging her. The incident was taken as evidence that the North Koreans were beginning to use fire control more regularly. On April 11, Wiltsie and McGinty were taken under fire by Wonsan shore batteries. Both ships conducted maneuvers in separate areas and delivered counter battery fire.

Silverstein, USS Cabildo and USS Apache fired suppression fire against the batteries on Ho-do Pan-do. McGinty was straddled by enemy shore batteries as she moved near Wonsan on April 17. McGinty and USS Maddox replied with counter fire and the enemy guns were destroyed. USS Cabildo was attacked again from shore batteries on April 29 from Ho-do Pan-do. Three near misses straddled the ship and one direct hit caused minor damage to structure and electrical wiring, wounding two.

On the same day, USS Silverstein and USS Maddox were covering the withdrawal of two friendly sampans from Umi-do, when suddenly enemy batteries opened fire. The sampans received the first salvos, around 30 total so Silverstein and Maddox returned the fire and suppressed the batteries. Aircraft from USS Valley Forge were also called in to provide close air support. Silverstein received 110 rounds of estimated 105 millimeter batteries though she was not damaged, Maddox received two rounds. There were no allied casualties in the action.

USS Waxbill attacked a shore battery the following day and on April 28 Silverstein and USS Conserver received fire from Ho-do Pan-do. With South Korean small craft, the allied ships bombarded the opposing battery and laid a smoke screen while other nearby ships withdrew. Conserver received ten rounds of estimated 122-millimeter fire. On May 7, USS Waxbill was fired on by twelve rounds but apparently did not return fire and on May 10, while sweeping Wonsan Harbor, USS Merganser and USS Redhead received ten rounds of enemy fire from Kalmagak.

Also that day, Maddox and USS Laffey attacked North Korean railroad targets, scoring many hits. Two railroad cars were damaged along with two buildings. Batteries on Kalmagak fired ten rounds of 76-millimeter fire at the sweepers, the nearest one landing 100 yards from the ship. Counter fire by Maddox scored two more hits. On the next day, Maddox, Laffey, USS Herbert J. Thomas and USS Evansville, received 206 rounds of 75- and 155-millimeter fire and an hour-long engagement.

North Koreans were using hidden guns which were difficult to locate but were believed to have been fired from Han-do Pan-do, Hapchin-ni and Kalamagak. Return fire destroyed three enemy gun positions and Herbert J. Thomas was hit once, causing little damage and no casualties. On May 17, TG-95.2 reported that an interrogation of seven prisoners, captured off Ho-do Pan-do the day before, revealed that the enemy were planning an attack on Yodo in the near future. Troops were being concentrated in two locations on He-do Pan-do and were going to use about eighty fishing sampans for transport. Ten days later on May 27, shore batteries at Wonsan fought against USS Cabildo and Ozbourn. In a typical duel the American ships bombarded the coast and were not damaged. The day after USS Ozbourn accepted the surrender of two North Koreans soldiers.

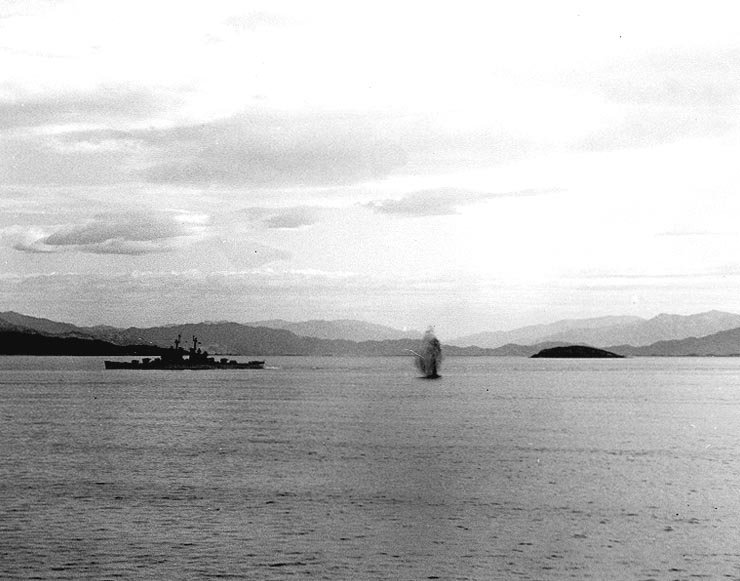
USS Manchester under fire off Wonsan.

USS O'Bannon suppressed enemy batteries on May 29 after the North Koreans opened fire on friendly islands. USS Ozbourn, USS Radford, and USS Heron also engaged on May 29 and May 30. Ozbourn received six rounds of 155-millimeter fire and, Radford, ten rounds of estimated 75-millimeter gunfire with the nearest one landing fifty yards from the ship. Heron was hit by machine gun fire that hit aft section of the vessel. There were no friendly casualties in any of the actions and in all cases the ships returned fire with naval guns.

On June 5, O'Bannon, Radford and USS Lofberg attacked and silenced a battery of 75-millimeter guns south of Ho-do Pan-do. The artillery opened fire on some American minesweepers but were quickly quieted by the escorts. North Koreans artillery in Wonsan bombarded Hwangto-do on June 7. No casualties were reported but twenty-one shot holes were found to have passed through the flag over the island. USS Albuquerque was straddled by enemy fire on June 12, wounding one man and on June 19 the North Koreans staged another artillery bombardment against friendly held Hwangto-do. USS Parks caught 300 enemy troops repairing a railroad, south of Wonsan on the same day, and fired twenty-eight rounds. She reported inflicting seventy-four casualties and scoring hits on a railroad bridge and tracks. When it became dark, Parks also fired star shells at the location for bombing runs by allied aircraft.

The next exchange in the siege of Wonsan occurred a month later on August 10, 1952. Enemy gun positions on He-do Pan-do, fired upon USS Barton and USS Jarvis with approximately 250 75-millimeter to 155-millimeter guns. Barton suffered superficial damage, one man killed, and one wounded. Jarvis was not damaged and counter battery fire destroyed two gun emplacements.

Two days after, USS Grapple was the target for about thirty rounds of 105-millimeter artillery. The ship was hit once below the waterline causing slight damage. USS Barton fired eighty-nine shots in response and scored three hits on two North Korean batteries. ROKN FS-905 was also attacked on May 12. While anchored off Yo-do Island, with a cargo of gasoline and ammunition for motor torpedo boats, ROKN FS-905 was taken under fire by enemy shore guns and received one hit in the starboard machine gun battery. The damage was light and there were no casualties. Hwangto-do was bombarded again on August 16 by the North Koreans with four 155-millimeter artillery pieces and large mortars from Kalmagak. The guns could not be located so none of the allied warships could respond.

==== Typhoon Karen ====
Typhoon Karen swept through Korean waters over the next few days so also blockading activities were suspended. Several UN warships were damaged during the height of the storm. The communists used the chance to attack Hwangto-do again. After the typhoon passed USS Lewis fired seven rounds of 5-inch shells at an enemy battery on Kalmagak, which was firing on friendly islands in the Wonsan area. The enemy artillery was silenced although they killed one person and wounded two others.

On September 11, 1952, batteries on Umi-do fired eighteen 105-millimeter rounds at USS Lewis, no damage or casualties. On September 13, aircraft from USS Bon Homme Richard attacked a 130-foot naval like vessel near Wonsan and sank it with rockets and 20-millimeter strafing. The enemy ship was one of the few sunk by UN forces during the war. Two days later, Barton hit a suspected floating mine while sailing 100 miles due east of Wonsan Harbor. Five enlisted men were counted missing and later presumed dead, six other men were wounded. The fire room flooded and there was other less severe damage. Flooding was brought under control and she set a course for Sasebo under her own power.

USS Alfred A. Cunningham received five hits on September 19. Guns from Wonsan, estimated to be 105 to 155 millimeters, at a distance of 3,500 yards away, hit the ship with their first shot. Four more followed along with seven nearby air bursts. Eight Americans were wounded but none of them were fatal. The ship was moderately damaged but she was capable of unleashing 159 rounds of return fire.

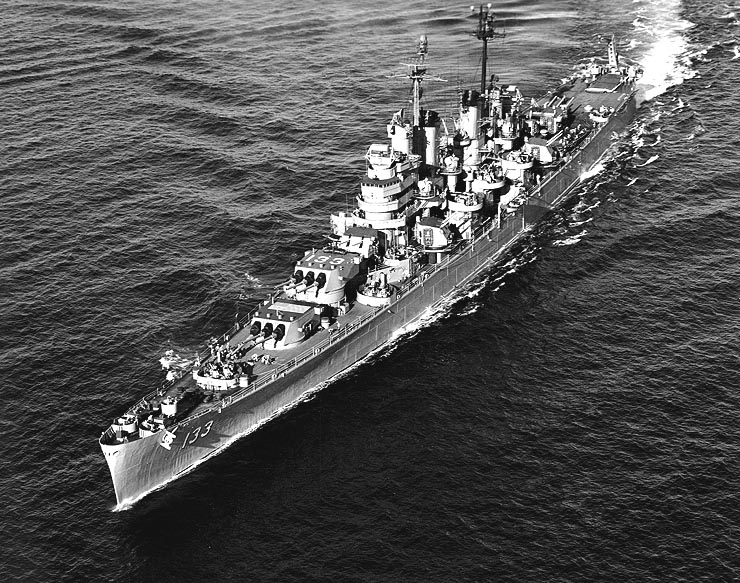
USS Toledo in September 1951

USS Jenkins and USS Taylor came under fire from shore batteries in the vicinity of Hwangto-do The two vessels received an estimated twenty-one rounds of 90-millimeter and three rounds of 105-millimeter, but there was no damage. North Korean forces also bombarded Hwangto-do though their batteries were silenced by thirty-nine rounds from Jenkins. The North Koreans attacked Yo-do Island with artillery a few days later and on September 23 USS Iowa was attacked but her 16-inch guns quickly silenced the perpetrators. USS Taylor also silenced a battery on September 25 and Heron received 105-millimeter fire but was not damaged. Three splashes were counted near the ship.

==== North Korean air attack ====
The first and only naval air battle at Wonsan and Hungnam occurred on October 7. MiG-15s attacked TF-77 aircraft three times, one MIG made a firing pass on two American AD planes so they returned fire. There were no damage or casualties on either side and the MiGs retired to the west. Later on four MiG-15s attacked a flight of F4Us while two others attacked eight ADs near Hungnam. In these engagements there were no casualties, but in a final attack later on that day, a single MIG-15 destroyed one of four F4Us in another action near Hungnam.

On October 16, USS Toledo was shot at with four rounds from estimated 75-millimeter and 122-millimeter guns. No damage was reported as all of the shells landed splashed in the water around 1,000 yards short of the ship, USS Mansfield was also attacked with about forty 75-millimeter rounds. For over a month no artillery was exchanged until November 20 when USS Kite and USS Thompson received fire from 120-millimeter guns. The Thompson was hit by one round of the many which straddled her, wounding one and causing minor material damage. USS Kite fought another duel on the following day. She received fifty-five 75-millimeter rounds but again sustained no casualties.

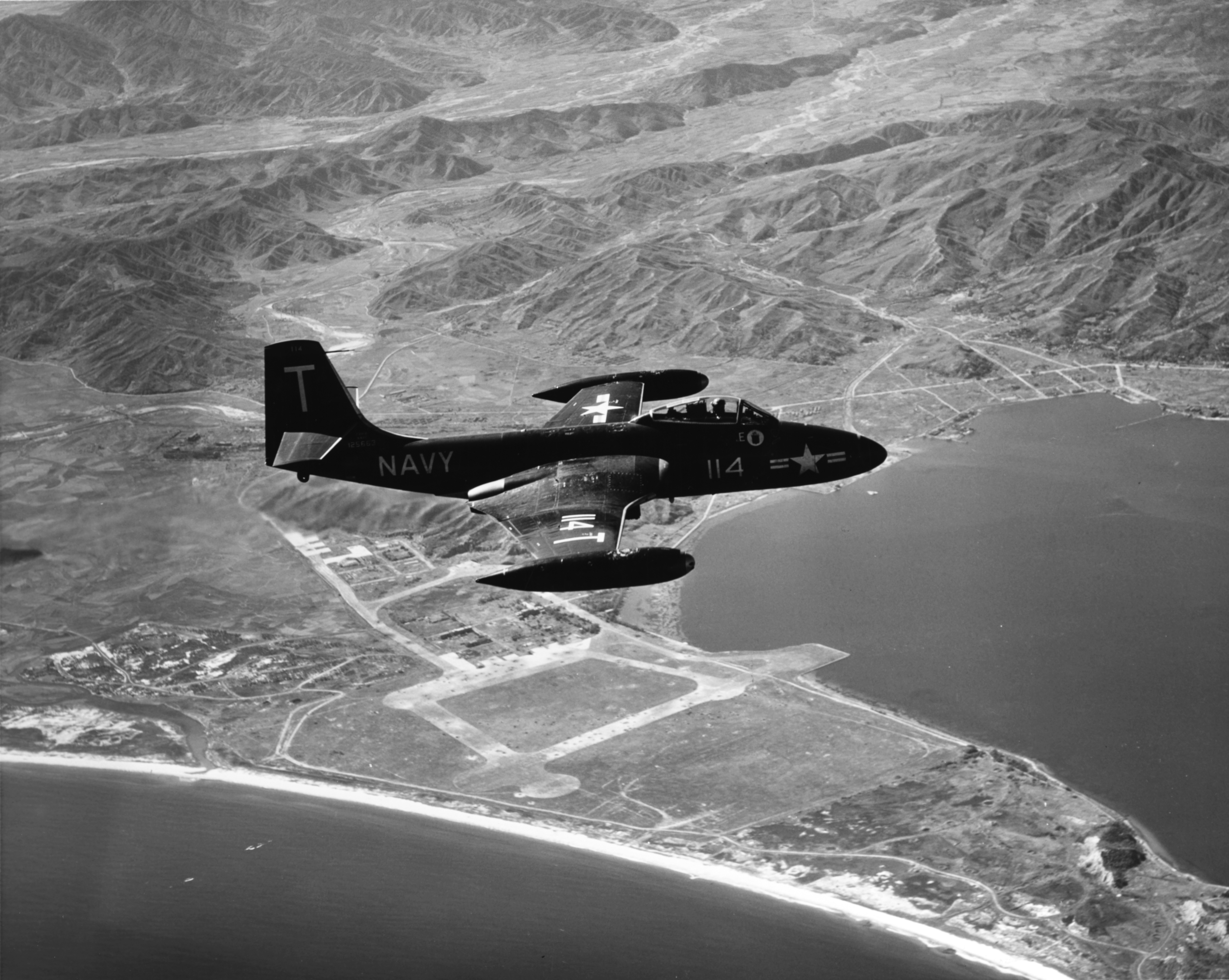
A U.S. Navy aircraft flies over Wonsan on 20 October 1952.

On October 21 Lewis was furnishing gunfire support for two Republic of Korea minesweepers operating in Wonsan Harbor when they came under fire by enemy guns. Lewis moved in to assist, returning gunfire and deploying smoke to obscure the minesweepers. She was hit by two 75 mm shells. One landed topside and caused minor damage and slightly injured one man. The other pierced the hull plating of fireroom number one. The round did not detonate, but it caused a steam explosion which instantly killed six men and mortally injured a seventh. Lewis continued without assistance to return gunfire and to deploy smoke. She then disengaged and made emergency repairs in Japan. Memorial services for the men who were killed in action were held on board on October 27.

On November 25, Thompson found herself in action, this time against enemy aircraft. Jets dropped six to eight explosives over the American ship, the closest landing 300 yards (270 m) away. The aircraft were heard by the Thompson's lookout but her radar showed nothing. When USS Merganser was fired upon by guns at the mouth of the Namchongang River on December 6, William Seiverling replied with 101 rounds. Seiverling was herself taken under fire by guns on Kalmagak.

On the following day, Merganser received thirty more rounds of 75-millimeter fire from Kalmagak but she was not damaged. USS Shields, USS William Seiverling and UN minesweepers were fired upon by approximately seventy-five rounds on December 11. The small minesweepers were forced to slip their gear and use smoke pots to help cover themselves. That same day, USS Waxbill and USS Marshall collided west of Yo-do, Waxbill sustained topside damage to hull fittings but was still operational and otherwise unharmed.

On December 12 Marshall was attacked again, twenty rounds were fired her way but they all missed. USS Grasp and William Seiverling were also attacked and they too escaped harm. About forty rounds of North Korean artillery targeted Waxbill and Marshall on December 13, while they were patrolling near the Namchongang's mouth. Though the fire was accurate, no hits were made. The closest shot splashed in the water 10 feet (3 m) from Waxbill which caused shrapnel damage. Twelve shots were fired in return.

Waxbill came under fire again on December 19. Three rounds were fired her way but none struck the ship. A few days later, USS Toledo received the same treatment while bombarding the city but was not damaged either. On December 23, while providing gunfire support for the minesweepers in Wonsan Harbor, USS Marshall, USS McGowan received approximately thirty rounds of estimated 75-millimeter shells. During the firing, four to nine airbursts fell near McGowan, sixty to seventy near Marshall, and several rounds between the minesweepers. Throughout the engagements the North Koreans failed to cause any damage. McGowan engaged in another shore battery action two days later.

=== Height of the fighting ===
January 2, 1953 marked the first day in a large-scale North Korean bombardment of the UN held islands in Wonsan Harbor. Over the course of the next few months, enemy shore batteries in and around Wonsan fired hundreds of rounds primarily against Hwangto-do and Yo-do. The operation lasted until May and less sporadically thereafter. It was also a failure as UN intelligence estimated that ninety percent of the North Korean shore batteries were active against UN islands rather than the blockading fleet, though throughout the bombardments, which occurred almost on a daily basis, only four UN personnel were killed and fifteen wounded. During the operation, UN ships constantly responded with counter battery fire.

On February 9 and February 10, a maximum strike effort by American naval aircraft was conducted against supply concentrations and transport targets from Wonsan through Songjin to Chongjin and Hoeryong. USS Philippine Sea, USS Oriskany and USS Kearsarge participated in the operations which caused extensive damage to the communists logistics system. As part of the communist bombardment in the Wonsan area, enemy shells killed two men on February 14, including an American marine, and wounded nine others in the most successful North Korean artillery attack against UN land forces. A command post on Yo-do was also damaged, one DUKW was destroyed and two other sustained damaged to their hulls. An aid station, two tents and communication wires were also damaged. Two bunkers caved in on Hwangto-do.

On March 5, during a heavy UN bombardment in Wonsan Harbor, USS Missouri was challenged by five rounds of 105-millimeter shore battery fire. Missouri was not hit and she hastily silenced the battery. Five days later Missouri received fifteen more rounds of 75-millimeter to 155-millimeter cannon fire while bombarding the city. The American ship escaped damage again, the nearest shot landing 500 yards (460 m) off her location. USS Merganser was also engaged with the nearest shot splashing harmlessly 200 yards (180 m) from her.

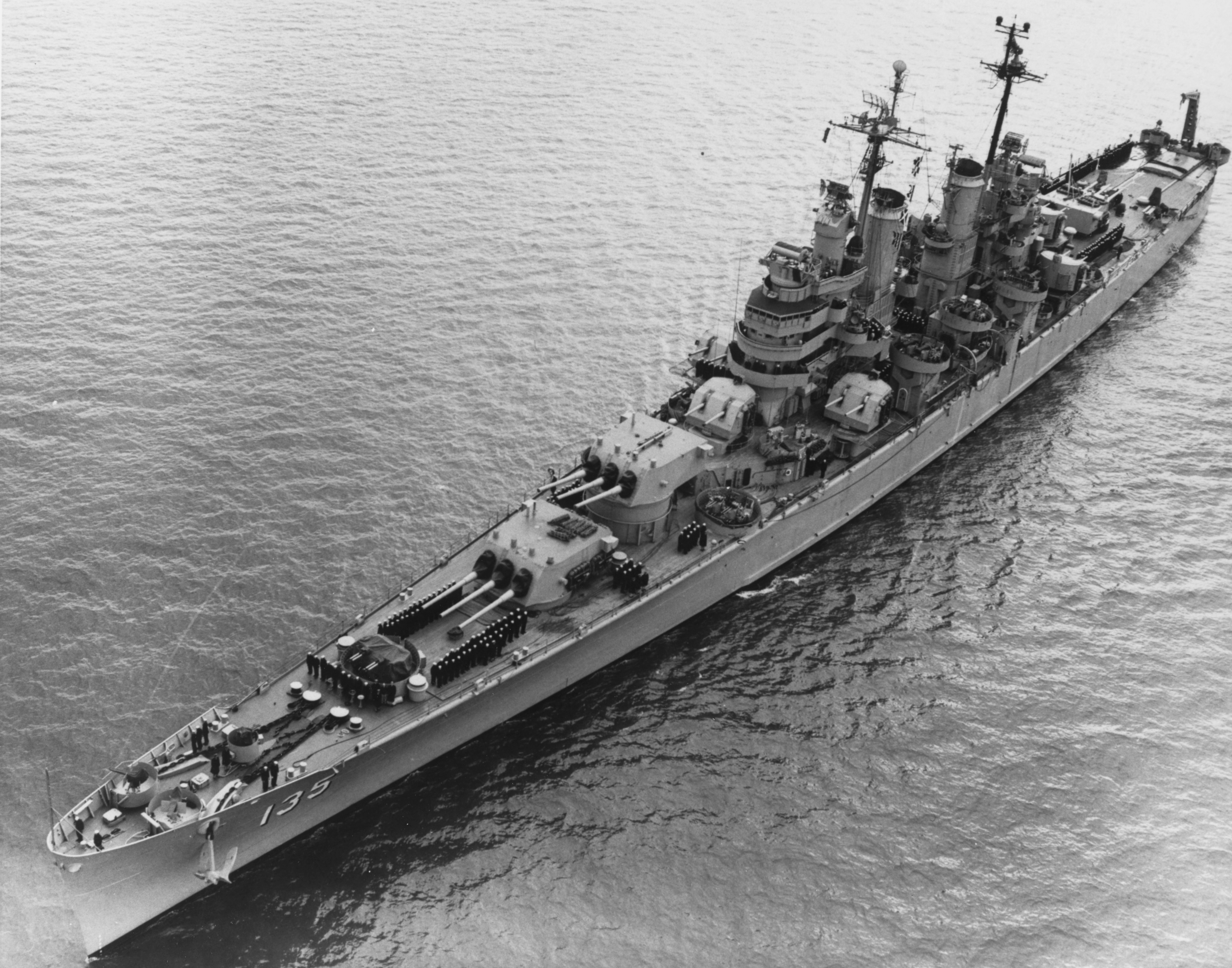
The cruiser USS Los Angeles during the war

On March 18, 1953, USS Los Angeles was carrying out bombardment duties at Wonsan when two air bursts and one surface round landed near the ship. On March 22, during another heavy bombardment, two 90-millimeter air bursts and two 105-millimeter rounds landed near Missouri but she was undamaged. USS Prichett and Waxbill also received fire but no damage resulted in any of the attacks. Prichett was attacked again on March 25 but no damage was sustained, USS Shelton, USS Eversole, ROKN AMS-502 and ROKN AMS-515 engaged in a similar action the following day.

USS Los Angeles was hit by one enemy round on March 27 but the damage was light and no one was injured. A day later two air bursts landed 200 yards from Prichett and on March 30 and March 31, Prichett evaded thirty-five more enemy shots without damage. Eight days of combined naval and air operations then started against the defenses of Wonsan. TF-77 aircraft pounded the city but the results were negligible. On April 2, USS Los Angeles received another hit by Wonsan shore batteries. This time there was only minor structural damage to the mainmast though thirteen men were injured. Fourteen others, who were wearing body armor, were also hit but not wounded.

The North Korean batteries targeted naval vessels on April 5, USS Maddox received six rounds of 75-millimeter while ROKN AMS-515 avoided fifty shots of 105-millimeter fire. Neither of the ships were struck. Two days later on April 7, the communists again targeted the blockading ships but without results. USS Los Angeles and USS McCord evaded two rounds, the enemy also continued their bombardment of friendly islands off Wonsan. On April 8, at least sixty-four shots were fired at the fleet and a couple days after, USS Eversole and Los Angeles engaged in a duel with shore batteries.

On April 16, Maddox was hit with one shot out of 156 fired at her during a forty-minute action against a ten-gun battery. The shot, a 76-millimeter, hit port side on the main deck, tearing a sixteen-inch hole and wounding three men. Maddox responded with counter fire but failed to silence the hostile guns. USS Shelton was fired at three times on April 17. April 19 was a lively day during the Blockade of Wonsan. Twenty-five rounds from 105-millimeter guns were fired at Eversole but as was typical, the North Koreans did not strike the ship. USS Curlew also received three shots and another forty-one at New Jersey and USS Renshaw. The only ship damaged in action that day was USS James E. Kyes. One 155-millimeter round, out of sixty, tore a three-foot hole through James E. Kyes, wounding four men in the process, one seriously.

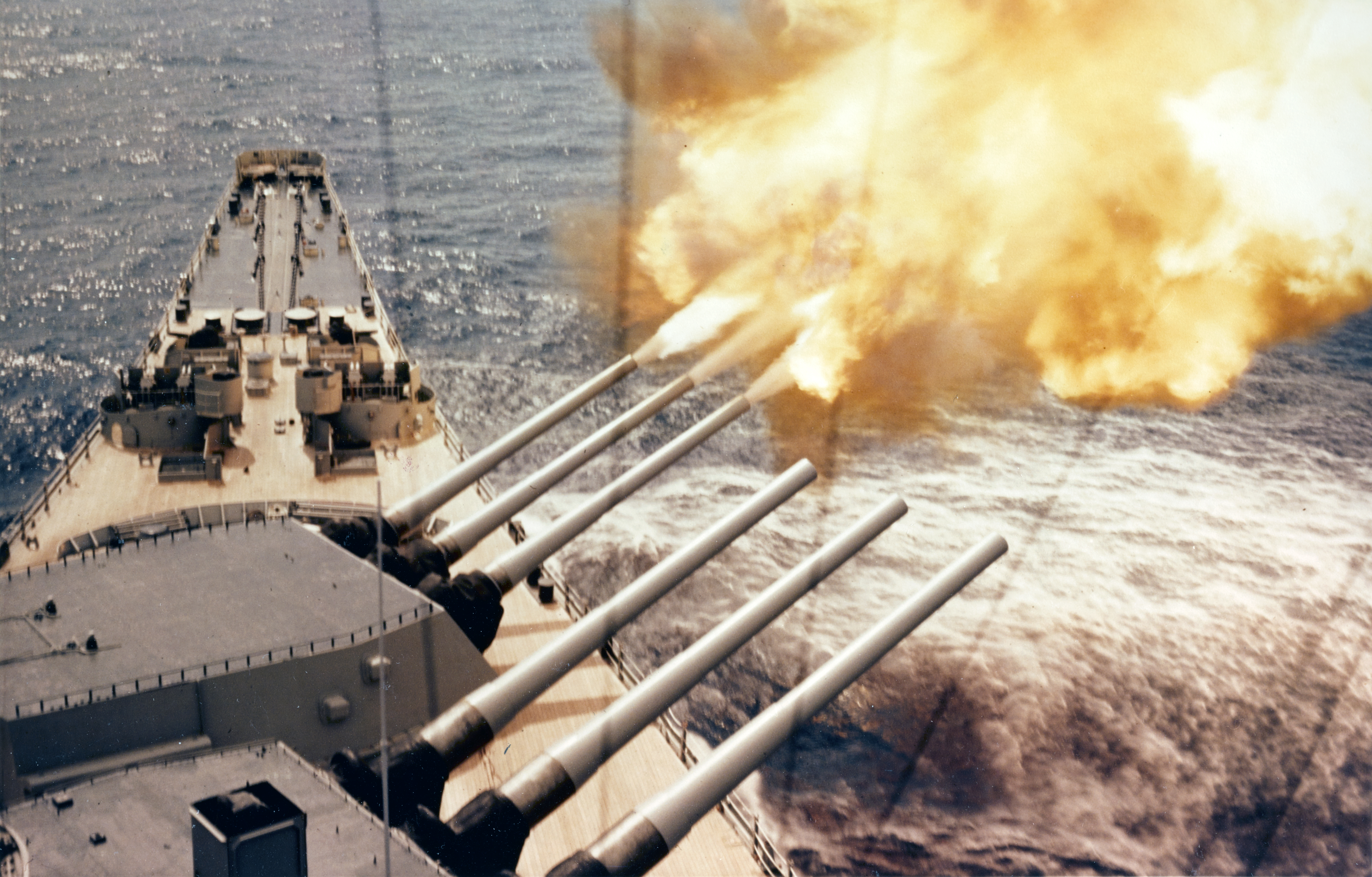
USS Wisconsin firing on the Korean coast.

==== North Korean bombardment of UN held islands ====
On April 22, the North Korean bombardment of UN held islands continued, with dozens of rounds being fired each day, some of which hit but only slightly damaged USS Manchester. Between 2:30 and 4:00 pm on April 23, the island of Tee-do came under intense enemy fire from gun positions on Kalma Pan-do. Five marines were wounded, including one American. USS Henderson provided counter fire while USS Owen took aboard the casualties. During the mission, Henderson and Owen were fired on so they withdrew and TF-77 aircraft took over by bombing the area.

On the next day, Wonsan guns fired around 100 rounds of 76-millimeter to 105-millimeter rounds at the USS James C. Owens and USS Henderson. No damage or casualties were reported. James C. Owens was attacked on April 25 though again there was no damage sustained. On April 29, as the bombardment of UN held islands continued, an HU-1 helicopter received fourteen rounds of VT fuzed enemy shells while on a mine reconnaissance flight over Wonsan Harbor. The aircraft was not damaged but the encounter told the Americans that another new type of weapon was being used by North Korean forces. USS Gurke also avoided six enemy shells that day.

April 1953 was reported by the United States Navy as being the height of the three-year battle with enemy forces. The North Koreans fired over 2,000 artillery rounds in defiance of the blockade alone, and over 1,000 more at the friendly guerrilla-held islands. Usually the average was about 500 rounds a month. North Koreans troops also constructed hidden batteries on Ho-do Pan-do, which the Americans bombarded with 5-inch guns but to no effect. Because of this, UN naval forces were ordered to stay out of the area in daylight until the weapons could be destroyed by cruisers and battleships or naval aircraft.

Mine warfare also increased during the month of April. After months of finding nothing, thirty-two new mines were found in Wonsan Harbor. On May 2 the hidden guns made two hits and two near misses each on USS Maddox and USS Owen. Both ships received slight damage but suffered no casualties. Over two hundred shells were fired by the enemy. Gurke came under fire on the following day, along with the friendly islands of Wonsan Harbor. USS Bremerton engaged in a heavy gun strike against enemy batteries eighteen rounds of 76-millimeter to 105-millimeter shells flew by. One near miss gave two men minor wounds and the ship received superficial damage topside. USS Samuel N. Moore was hit by a 90-millimeter shell on May 8 but it did no significant damage. The round hit starboard side just above the waterline. The same battery fired at USS Brush, sixty-four total.

==== Allied air strike against Yo-do island ====
On May 15, TF-77 aircraft attacked an airfield on Yo-do island while American ships silenced the batteries on the islands. USS Brush was hit in the mount that day, making it inoperable, and nine men were wounded, four seriously. The battleship New Jersey was fired at on May 27 but her 16-inch guns quickly put an end to it. Meanwhile, the islands were still receiving their daily barrage which continued in June. Heavy gun strikes also continued and the communists resisted every UN attack but very few hits were made. On June 3, Wonsan shore batteries fifteen 105-millimeter shells at USS John A. Bole and USS Lofberg but no damage occurred. The guns were silenced by return fire.

USS LSMR-409 was hit on June 4, causing moderate damage to the messing compartment and the radio room, and resulting in five men wounded. The enemy fired thirty rounds of 76-millimeter fire before being silenced by over 200 rockets from the LSMR. USS PC-706 destroyed five North Korean fishing boats on the beach at the northern end of Ho-do Pan-do. The weather was very foggy due to Typhoon Judy, which hampered TF-77's operations for three days. Lofberg and John A. Bole were attacked on June 8 by batteries, but it was another inconclusive contact. John A. Bole spent the next day bombarding enemy guns. On June 11, USS Wiltsie received an estimated forty-five rounds of 105-millimeter fire. The vessel was hit once on the starboard side of her main deck but was still completely operational. Shrapnel caused a lot of damage and a four-inch hole in the deck. No casualties were inflicted on American forces.

Three days after this incident USS Bremerton, USS Lofberg and USS John A. Bole exchanged fire with the batteries, several guns were destroyed and there were no friendly casualties. Lofberg, John A. Bole and USS Current received 110 rounds of fire on the next day without effect. Shore batteries on Ho-do Pan-do were increasingly menacing the allied blockade. Concentrated fire was directed against destroyers in Wonsan Harbor on June 17. USS Irwin and USS Rowan re-escaped to seventy-five founds and Henderson avoided another seventy-five, the nearest landing ten yards from Henderson.

Irwin and Rowan would fight another battle the following day. In it the North Koreans scored their highest number of hits in one engagement. USS Irwin was hit by one round from Kalmagak and it tore a 3-foot (0.9 m) hole in the main deck. Five American sailors were wounded. Rowan suffered five hits and ten wounded and she received forty-five rounds of different caliber altogether. The destroyer was moderately damaged. Thirty-six shells were fired at Saint Paul but she was not hit.

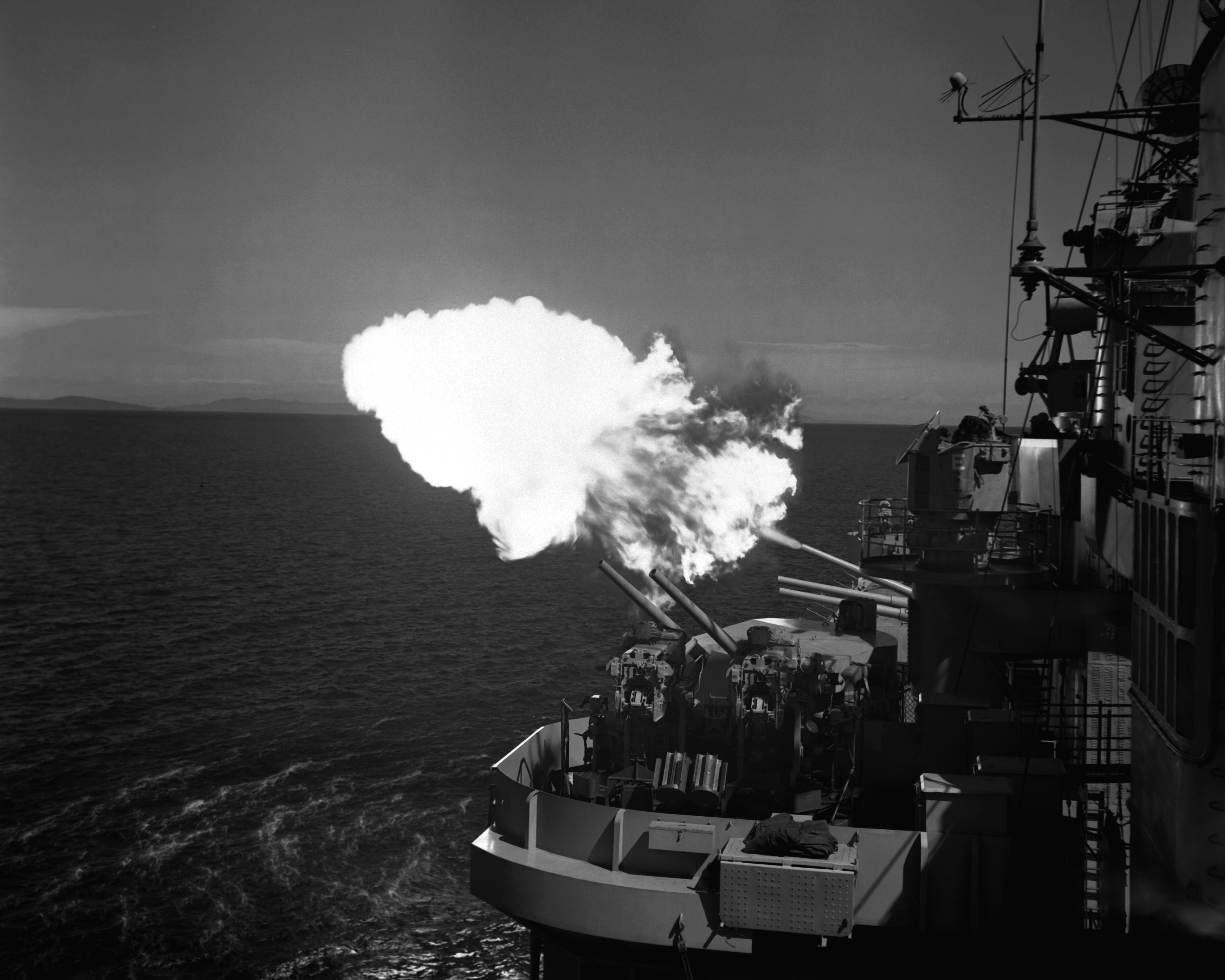
USS Saint Paul firing the last shots of the blockade on July 27, 1953

A small surface engagement occurred the same day. An armed South Korean Army intelligence boat encountered a North Korean thirty foot patrol boat and for ten minutes the vessels fought until the North Koreans withdrew under cover of a battery. The patrol boat had a speed of twenty knots, carried a radio and was armed with rocket launchers, machine guns and the crew carried various small arms. On June 19 Rowan and Bremerton were fired on but no hits resulted.

USS Manchester was conducting a heavy bombardment of Wonsan on or about July 3 when fragments from a near miss put a two-inch hole in the after stack and through the door of a powder room. On July 7, North Korean gunners on Ho-do Pan-do fired on the blockade. Over 300 rounds of 76-millimeter to 122-millimeter fire landed near USS Lofberg, USS Thomason and USS Hamner. Thomason suffered holes and dents topside due to air burst straddles, but there were no casualties. The Americans returned 880 rounds of counter battery fire before the action ended.

A few days after, North Korean artillery fired forty-eight rounds of 76-millimeter to 105-millimeter shells at USS Saint Paul and scored a hit on a gun mount. Two guns were damaged but nobody was wounded. For the next several days, the North Koreans focused on attacking UN islands until July 23, when Saint Paul drew twelve rounds of 155-millimeter fire, all of which splashed in the water ten to fifty yards from the ship. On July 27 Saint Paul fired the last American shots of the battle against shore batteries. With the signing of an armistice, the fighting came to an end after 861 days of action.

== Aftermath ==
United Nations ships at Wonsan achieved a significant goal by maintaining a blockade against hostile territory for so long. UN naval forces inflicted heavy casualties on the North Korean forces while sustaining comparatively few casualties of their own. The North Korean artillerymen who defended Wonsan were mostly ineffective, thousands of dollars' worth of artillery shells were wasted. Wonsan was destroyed and remained so for years after the war, but due to its location, it was eventually rebuilt and is still an important strategic point.

== See also ==
- List of U.S. Navy ships sunk or damaged in action during the Korean War
