= List of U.S. Navy ships sunk or damaged in action during the Korean War =

This is a list of U.S. Navy ships sunk or damaged in action during the Korean War:

== Sunk in action ==
1. USS Magpie (AMS-25) blew up after striking a mine, 21 killed/missing in action and 12 survivors, 29 September 1950.
2. USS Pirate (AM-275) sunk after striking a mine at Wonsan, North Korea, 13 killed/missing, 12 October 1950.
3. USS Pledge (AM-277) sunk after striking a mine at Wonsan, North Korea, 12 October 1950.
4. USS Partridge (AMS-31) sunk after striking a mine, 8 killed, 6 seriously wounded, 2 February 1951.
5. USS Sarsi (ATF-111) sunk after striking a mine at Hungnam, North Korea, 4 killed 4 wounded, 27 August 1952.

== Damaged in action ==
1. USS Collett (DD-730) damaged by North Korean coastal artillery during the landing at Inchon; 7 hits with 5 wounded, 13 September 1950
2. USS Gurke (DD-783) minor damage from coastal artillery during the landing at Inchon; 3 hits, no casualties, 13 September 1950
3. USS Lyman K. Swenson (DD-729) 2 near misses by coastal artillery during the landing at Inchon; 1 killed and 1 wounded, 13 September 1950.
4. USS Brush (DD-745) damaged after striking a mine at off the coast of Tanchon, North Korea; 9 killed and 10 wounded, 26 September 1950.
5. USS Mansfield (DD-728) damaged after striking a mine; 5 missing and 48 wounded, 30 September 1950.
6. USS Charles S. Sperry (DD-697) damaged by 3 hits from a shore battery at Songjin, North Korea, 23 December 1950.
7. USS Ozbourn (DD-846) damaged after being hit by a shore battery at Wonsan, North Korea, 2 casualties, 23 December 1950.
8. USS Walke (DD-723) extensively damaged after striking a mine off the east coast of North Korea, 26 killed. 12 June 1951.
9. USS Thompson (DMS-38) extensively damaged after being hit by a shore battery at Songjin, North Korea, 3 killed and 4 wounded, 14 June 1951. On 20 August 1052 Chinese battery hit the flying bridge killing 4 and wounding 9.
10. USS Hoquiam (PF-5) slightly damaged after being hit by a shore battery at Songjin, North Korea, 1 casualty, 7 May 1951.
11. USS New Jersey (BB-62) slightly damaged after being hit by a shore battery at Wonsan, North Korea, 4 casualties, 20 May 1951.
12. USS Brinkley Bass (DD-887) minor damage after being hit by a shore battery at Wonsan, North Korea, 8 casualties, 22 May 1951.
13. USS Frank E. Evans (DD-754) slightly damaged after being hit by a shore battery at Wonsan, North Korea, 4 casualties, 18 June 1951.
14. USS Henry W. Tucker (DDR-875) superficial damage after being hit by a shore battery at Wonsan, North Korea, 28 June 1951.
15. USS Everett (PF-8) minor damage after being hit by a shore battery at Wonsan, North Korea, 8 casualties, 3 July 1951.
16. USS Helena (CA-75) minor damage after being hit by a shore battery at Wonsan, North Korea, 2 casualties, 31 July 1951.
17. USS Dextrous (AM-341) superficial damage after being hit by a shore battery at Wonsan, North Korea, 1 killed and 3 wounded, 11 August 1951.
18. USS William Seiverling (DE-441) fireroom flooded after being hit by a shore battery at Wonsan, North Korea, no casualties, 8 September 1951.
19. USS Heron (AMS-18) superficial damage after being hit by a shore battery at Wonsan, North Korea, no casualties, 10 September 1951.
20. USS Redstart (AM-378) minor damage after being hit by a shore battery at Wonsan, North Korea, no casualties, 10 September 1951.
21. USS Firecrest (AMS-10) slight damage after being hit by a shore battery at Hungnam, North Korea, no casualties, 5 October 1951.
22. USS Ernest G. Small (DDR-838) extensive damage after striking a mine off the East coast of North Korea, 27 casualties, 7 October 1951.
23. USS Renshaw (DDE-499) slight damage after being hit by a shore battery at Songjin, North Korea, 1 casualty, 11 October 1951.
24. USS Ulvert M. Moore (DE-442) moderate damage after being hit by a shore battery at Hungnam, North Korea, 3 casualties, 17 October 1951.
25. USS Helena (CA-75) - slight damage after being hit by a shore battery at Hungnam, North Korea, 4 casualties, 23 October 1951.
26. USS Osprey (AMS-28) considerable damage after being hit by a shore battery at Wonsan, North Korea, 1 casualty, 29 October 1951.
27. USS Gloucester (PF-22) light damage after being hit by a shore battery at Hongwon, North Korea, 12 casualties, 11 November 1951.
28. USS Hyman (DD-732) minor damage after being hit by a shore battery at Wonsan, North Korea, no casualties, 23 November 1951.
29. USS Crook County (LST-611) superficial damage after being hit by a shore battery, no casualties, 22 December 1951.
30. USS Dextrous (AM-341) minor damage after being hit by a shore battery at Wonsan, North Korea, 3 casualties, 11 January 1952.
31. USS Porterfield (DD-682) minor damage after being hit by a shore battery at Sokto, North Korea, no casualties, 3 February 1952.
32. USS Endicott (DMS-35) minor damage after 2 hits from a shore battery at Songjin, North Korea, no casualties, 4 February 1952.
33. USS Rowan (DD-782) minor damage after 1 hit from a shore battery at Hungnam, North Korea, no casualties, 22 February 1952.
34. USS Shelton (DD-790) moderate damage after 3 hits from a shore battery at Songjin, North Korea, 15 casualties, 22 February 1952.
35. USS Henderson (DD-785) minor damage after being hit by a shore battery at Hungnam, North Korea, no casualties, 23 February 1952.
36. USS Wisconsin (BB-64) insignificant damage after 1 hit from a shore battery at Songjin, North Korea, 3 casualties, 16 March 1952.
37. USS Brinkley Bass (DD-887) moderate damage after 1 hit from a shore battery at Wonsan, North Korea, 5 casualties, 24 March 1952.
38. USS Endicott (DMS-35) insignificant damage after being hit by a shore battery at Chongjin, North Korea, no casualties, 7 April 1952.
39. USS Endicott (DMS-35) minor damage after 1 hit from a shore battery at Songjin, North Korea, no casualties, 19 April 1952.
40. USS Osprey (AMS-28) minor damage after 1 hit from a shore battery at Songjin, North Korea, no casualties, 24 April 1952.
41. USS Cabildo (LSD-16) minor damage after 1 hit from a shore battery at Wonsan, North Korea, 2 casualties, 26 April 1952.
42. USS Laffey (DD-724) superficial damage after being hit by a shore battery at Wonsan, North Korea, no casualties, 30 April 1952.
43. USS Maddox (DD-731) superficial damage after being hit by a shore battery at Wonsan, North Korea, no casualties, 30 April 1952.
44. USS Leonard F. Mason (DD-852) superficial damage after being hit by a shore battery at Wonsan, North Korea, no casualties, 2 May 1952.
45. USS James C. Owens (DD-776) considerable damage after 6 hits from a shore battery at Songjin, North Korea, 10 casualties, 7 May 1952.
46. USS Herbert J. Thomas (DDR-833) superficial damage after 1 hit from a shore battery at Wonsan, North Korea, no casualties, 12 May 1952.
47. USS Douglas H. Fox (DD-779) minor damage after 1 hit from a shore battery at Hungnam, North Korea, 2 casualties, 14 May 1952.
48. USS Cabildo (LSD-16) superficial damage after being hit by a shore battery at Wonsan, North Korea, 2 casualties, 25 May 1952.
49. USS Swallow (AMS-26) slight damage after 3 hits from a shore battery at Songjin, North Korea, no casualties, 25 May 1952.
50. USS Murrelet (AM-372) slight damage after being hit by a shore battery at Songjin, North Korea, no casualties, 26 May 1952.
51. USS Firecrest (AMS-10) minor damage after hits from machine gun mounts. No casualties, 30 May 1952.
52. USS Buck (DD-761) motor launch damaged after being hit by a shore battery at Kojo, North Korea, 2 casualties, 13 June 1952.
53. USS Orleck (DD-886) minor damage 1 hit after receiving 50 rounds of 75 mm from North Korean shore batteries; 4 casualties, 13 June 1952.
54. USS Southerland (DDR-743) minor damage after 4 hits from North Korean shore batteries; 8 casualties, 14 July 1952
55. USS John R. Pierce (DD-753) moderate damage after 7 hits from a North Korean shore battery at Tanchon, North Korea, 10 casualties, 6 August 1952.
56. USS Barton (DD-722) minor damage after 1 hit from a shore battery at Wonsan, North Korea, 2 casualties, 10 August 1952.
57. USS Grapple (ARS-7) minor damage after 1 hit below the waterline from a shore battery at Wonsan, North Korea, no casualties, 12 August 1952.
58. USS Thompson (DMS-38) minor damage in the vicinity of the bridge after an air burst and near misses from a shore battery at Songjin, North Korea, 13 casualties, 20 August 1952.
59. USS Competent (AM-316) superficial damage and lost sweep gear after a shrapnel near miss from a shore battery at Pkg. 4-5, no casualties, 27 August 1952.
60. USS McDermut (DD-677) superficial damage after receiving 60 rounds at 3,700 yards while at Pkg 4-5, no casualties, 27 August 1952.
61. USS Agerholm (DD-826) superficial damage after being hit by a shore battery at the Kangsong, North Korea area bombline, 1 casualty, 1 September 1952.
62. USS Frank E. Evans (DD-754) slight damage from near misses, after receiving 69 rounds, from a shore battery at Tanchon, North Korea, no casualties, 8 September 1952.
63. USS Barton (DD-722) major damage after striking a mine 90 miles east of Wonsan, North Korea, 11 casualties, 16 September 1952.
64. USS Alfred A. Cunningham (DD-752) moderate damage from 5 hits and 7 air bursts from North Korean shore batteries. Received 150 rounds of 105 mm from 3 guns. First round was a direct hit at an initial range of 3,500 yards. 8 casualties, 19 September 1952.
65. USS Perkins (DDR-877) superficial damage after being straddled by 5 rounds, from a shore battery at range of 5,000 yards, at Kojo, North Korea. The ship was sprayed with shrapnel from 2 near misses, 18 casualties, 13 October 1952.
66. USS Osprey (AMS-28) minor damage after being hit by a shore battery at Kojo, North Korea, 4 casualties, 14 October 1952.
67. USS Lewis (DE-535) moderate damage from 2 hits after receiving 50 rounds from 4-6 guns at Wonsan, North Korea, 8 casualties, 21 October 1952.
68. USS Mansfield (DD-728) minor shrapnel damage after receiving 40 rounds from 4 shore battery guns. The suspected radar controlled guns straddled the ship at a range of 4,300-8,000 yards. No casualties, 28 October 1952.
69. USS Uhlmann (DD-687) minor damage from 3 hits after receiving 160 rounds from a shore battery, 13 casualties, 3 November 1952.
70. USS Kite (AMS-22) 1 small boat destroyed by a shore battery at Wonsan, North Korea, 5 casualties, 19 November 1952.
71. USS Thompson (DMS-38) minor damage from 1 hit after receiving 89 rounds from a shore battery at Wonsan, North Korea, 1 casualty, 20 November 1952.
72. USS Hanna (DE-449) moderate damage from 1 hit after receiving 60 rounds from a shore battery at Songjin, North Korea, 1 casualty, 24 November 1952.
73. USS Halsey Powell (DD-686) whaleboat damaged after being hit by a shore battery at Hwa-do, North Korea, 2 casualties, 6 February 1953.
74. USS Gull (AMS-16) minor damage from 1 hit after receiving 60 rounds at a range of 5,400-10,000 yards from a North Korean shore battery while at Pkg 2, 2 casualties, 16 March 1953.
75. USS Taussig (DD-746) slight damage from 1 hit after receiving 45 rounds from a shore battery at a range of 6,400-10,000 yards, 1 casualty, 17 March 1953.
76. USS Los Angeles (CA-135) slight damage from 1 hit after receiving 40 rounds of 105 mm from a shore battery at Wonsan, North Korea, no casualties, 27 March 1953.
77. USS Los Angeles (CA-135) minor damage after 1 hit from a shore battery at Wonsan, North Korea, 13 casualties, 2 April 1953.
78. USS Maddox (DD-731) slight damage from 1–76 mm hit after receiving 209 rounds of heavy fire from a shore battery at Wonsan, North Korea, 3 casualties, 16 April 1953.
79. USS James E. Kyes (DD-787) slight damage from 1 hit after receiving 60 rounds of 155 mm at a range of 8,000-12,000 yards from a shore battery near Wonsan, North Korea, 9 casualties, 19 April 1953.
80. USS Maddox (DD-731) moderate damage from 1 hit from a shore battery at Hodo Pando, North Korea. The ship received 186 rounds of 105 mm and several near misses from 4 guns. No casualties, 2 May 1953.
81. USS Owen (DD-536) minor damage from 1 hit from a shore battery at Hodo Pando, North Korea. The ship received 100 rounds of 105 mm with 1 near miss and several straddles from 4 guns. No casualties, 2 May 1953.
82. USS Bremerton (CA-130) superficial damage after 1 near miss from a shore battery at Wonsan, North Korea. The ship received 18 rounds of 76 mm - 135 mm, 2 casualties, 5 May 1953.
83. USS Samuel N. Moore (DD-747) superficial damage from 1 hit from a shore battery at Wonsan, North Korea. The ship received 60 rounds of 90 mm, no casualties, 8 May 1953.
84. USS Brush (DD-745) minor damage after 1 hit from a shore battery at Wonsan, North Korea. The ship received 20 rounds of 76 mm, 9 casualties, 15 May 1953.
85. USS Swift (AM-122) superficial damage from 1 hit from a shore battery at Yang-do, North Korea. The ship received 30 rounds of 76 mm, 1 casualty, 29 May 1953.
86. USS Clarion River (LSM(R)-409) minor damage after 2 hits from a shore battery at Walsa-ri, North Korea. The ship received 30 rounds of 76 mm, 5 casualties, 4 June 1953.
87. USS Wiltsie (DD-716) superficial damage after 1 hit from a shore battery at Wonsan, North Korea. The ship received 35 rounds of 76 mm with several air bursts, no casualties, 11 June 1953.
88. USS Henderson (DD-785) superficial damage after being hit by a shore battery at Wonsan, North Korea, 17 June 1953.
89. USS Irwin (DD-794) minor damage from 1 hit after receiving 90 rounds near Wonsan, North Korea, 5 casualties, 18 June 1953.
90. USS Rowan (DD-782) moderate damage from 5 hits after receiving 45 rounds of 76–155 mm, at 7,500 yards, near Wonsan, North Korea, 9 casualties, 18 June 1953.
91. USS Gurke (DD-783) slight damage from 2 hits and shrapnel from 5 near misses after receiving 150 rounds of 76–90 mm, at 6,000 to 11,000 yards from a North Korean shore battery, near Songjin, North Korea, 3 casualties, 25 June 1953.
92. USS Manchester (CL-83) superficial damage after near misses during a 30-minute gun duel with a shore battery at Wonsan, North Korea, no casualties, 30 June 1953.
93. USS John W. Thomason (DD-760) minor shrapnel damage after near misses from 150 rounds of 107 mm from a shore battery at Hodo Pando, North Korea, 7 July 1953.
94. USS Irwin (DD-794) minor damage after 80 rounds of 76 mm air bursts close aboard from a shore battery at Pkg 2, 5 casualties, 8 July 1953.
95. USS Saint Paul (CA-73) Damaged on 17 November 1950, 6 wounded on Chongjin, on 21 April 1952 an accident during attacks against the ports of Wonsan and Chongjin left 30 killed. Underwater damage after one 76mm to 90 mm hit from a shore battery at Wonsan, North Korea, no casualties, 11 July 1953.

== Sources ==
This page is based on the public domain list at the US Department of the Navy web site .
