= Ryŏdo =

Island of North Korea

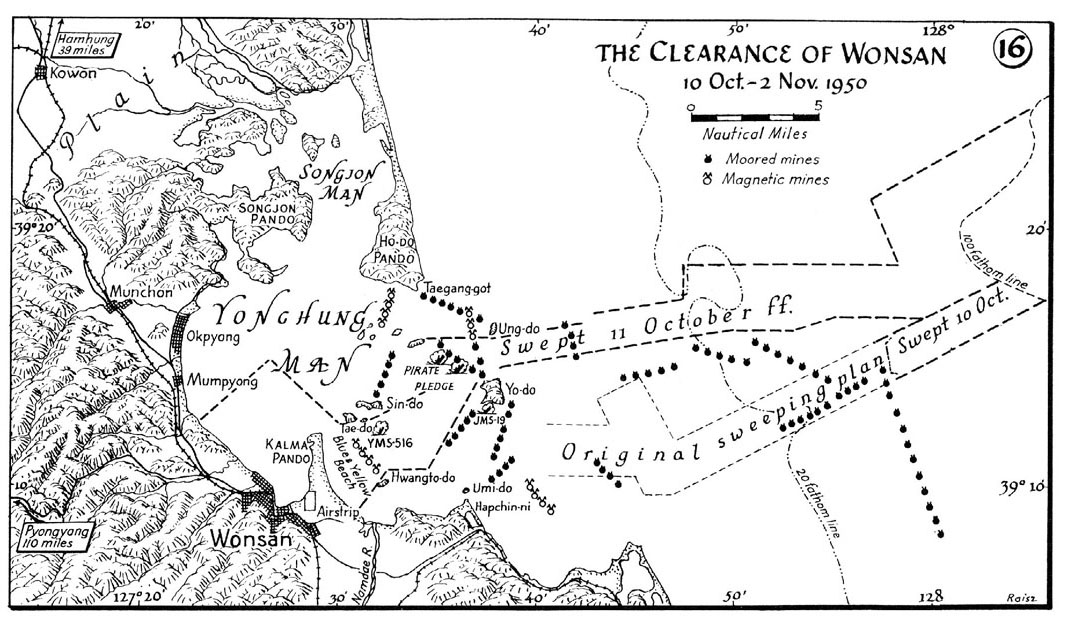
- Wonsan Harbor during the Korea War, "Yo-do" is in the centre

Korean name
- Hangul: 려도
- Hanja: 麗島
- RR: Ryeodo
- MR: Ryŏdo

Ryŏdo (Korean: 려도), sometimes called Ryodo Island, Ryo-do, Yo-do or Yodo-ri, is an island in Wonsan harbor in South Hamgyong Province, North Korea.

== History ==
=== Korean War ===
Following the evacuation of Wonsan by United Nations Command (UN) forces in December 1950 in the face of the Chinese Second Phase Offensive, UN forces instituted the Blockade of Wonsan. On 14 February 1951, following a preliminary reconnaissance the previous day, a joint United States Marine Corps (USMC) and Republic of Korea Marine Corps (ROKMC) force landed on Ryodo and proceeded to occupy the island which was populated by approximately 100 North Korean civilians. The USMC and ROKMC forces then proceeded to occupy most other islands in Wonsan Bay, including Sindo, Sodo, Daedo, Modo, Sado, Wungdo and Hwangtodo by 4 March 1951. Due to its strategic location at the entrance to Wonsan Harbor the United States Navy established observation posts on Ryodo and other islands which were used to track movements within the harbor and identify targets. On 31 March 1951 Republic of Korea Army Headquarters of Intelligence Department (HID) established an outpost of Ryodo and used it for intelligence gathering, particularly the infiltration of spies into North Korea.

Many members of the civilian population on Ryodo were voluntarily evacuated to South Korea. During the UN occupation Korean People's Army (KPA) prisoners captured during operations against North Korea were brought to the island for interrogation and those wishing to defect were allowed to remain on the island; in addition North Korean civilian defectors sought refuge on the island. North Korean intelligence attempted to infiltrate the UN operations on Ryodo and those suspected of being North Korean spies were moved to prisoner camps in South Korea.

Ryodo was the headquarters of the UN's East Coast Island Defense Command (redesignated the East Coast Defense Task Unit on 1 January 1953) and had the largest garrison, numbering approximately 300 troops.

US Navy rescue helicopters operating from USS Greer County would often take station on Ryodo for rescue missions in Wonsan Harbor.

On 9 June 1952 78 men of the US Navy's Amphibious Construction Battalion One arrived on Ryodo and by 25 June they had completed construction of a 2,400-foot (730 m) airfield named Briscoe Field after Admiral Robert P. Briscoe (39.233°N 127.624°E).

Ryodo was periodically bombarded by KPA artillery batteries around Wonsan throughout its occupation by the UN and so facilities were constructed to maximize the protection offered by the island's terrain.

Following the signing of the Korean Armistice Agreement on 27 July 1953, UN forces completed the evacuation of Ryodo on the evening of 1 August 1953.

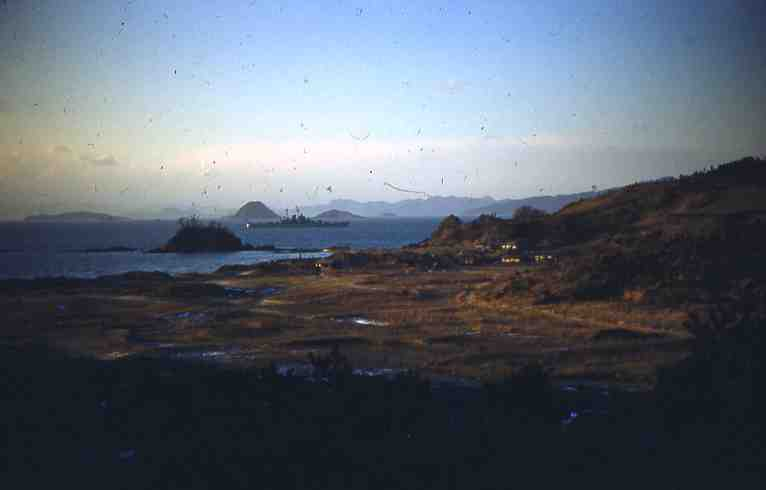
USS Wisconsin seen from Ryodo, January 1952

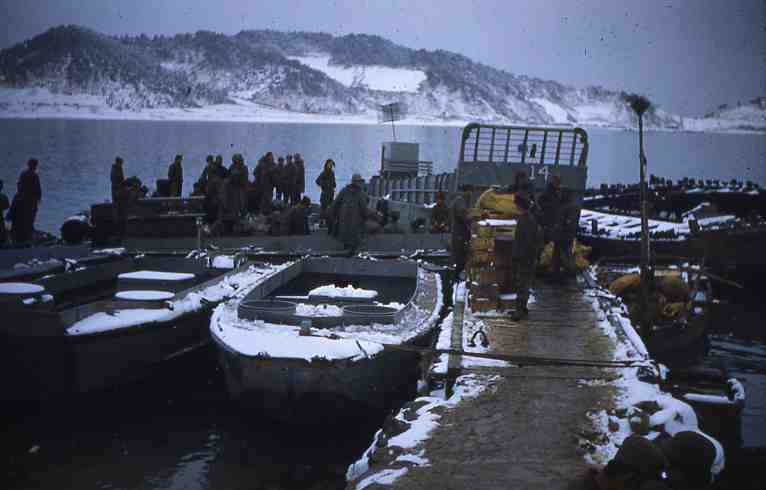
Ryodo dock, February 1952

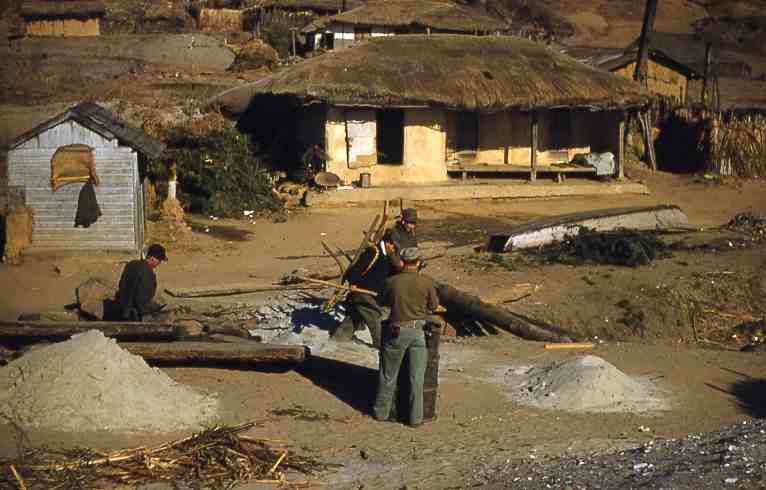
Village houses, Ryodo, January 1952

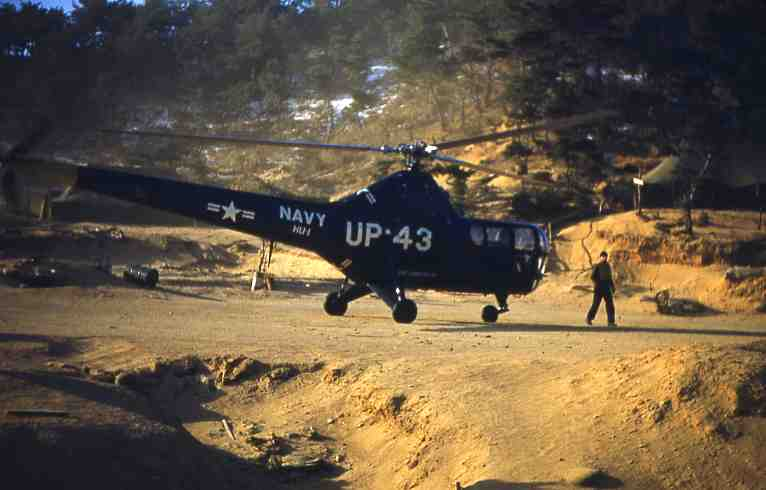
US Navy HU-1 S-51 rescue helicopter, Ryodo, January 1952

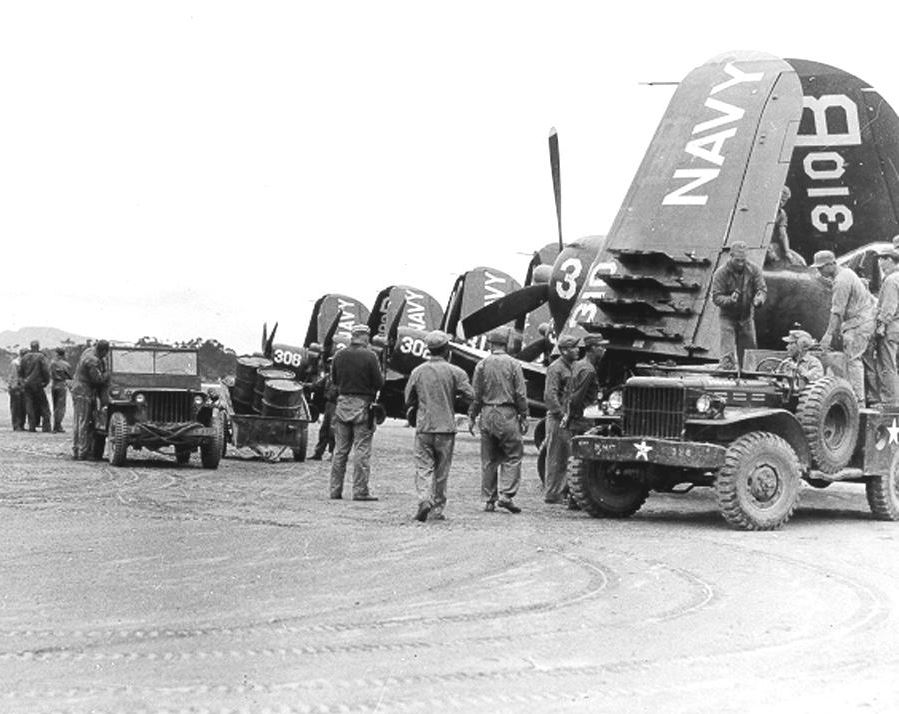
Refuelling F4U Corsairs, 15 July 1952

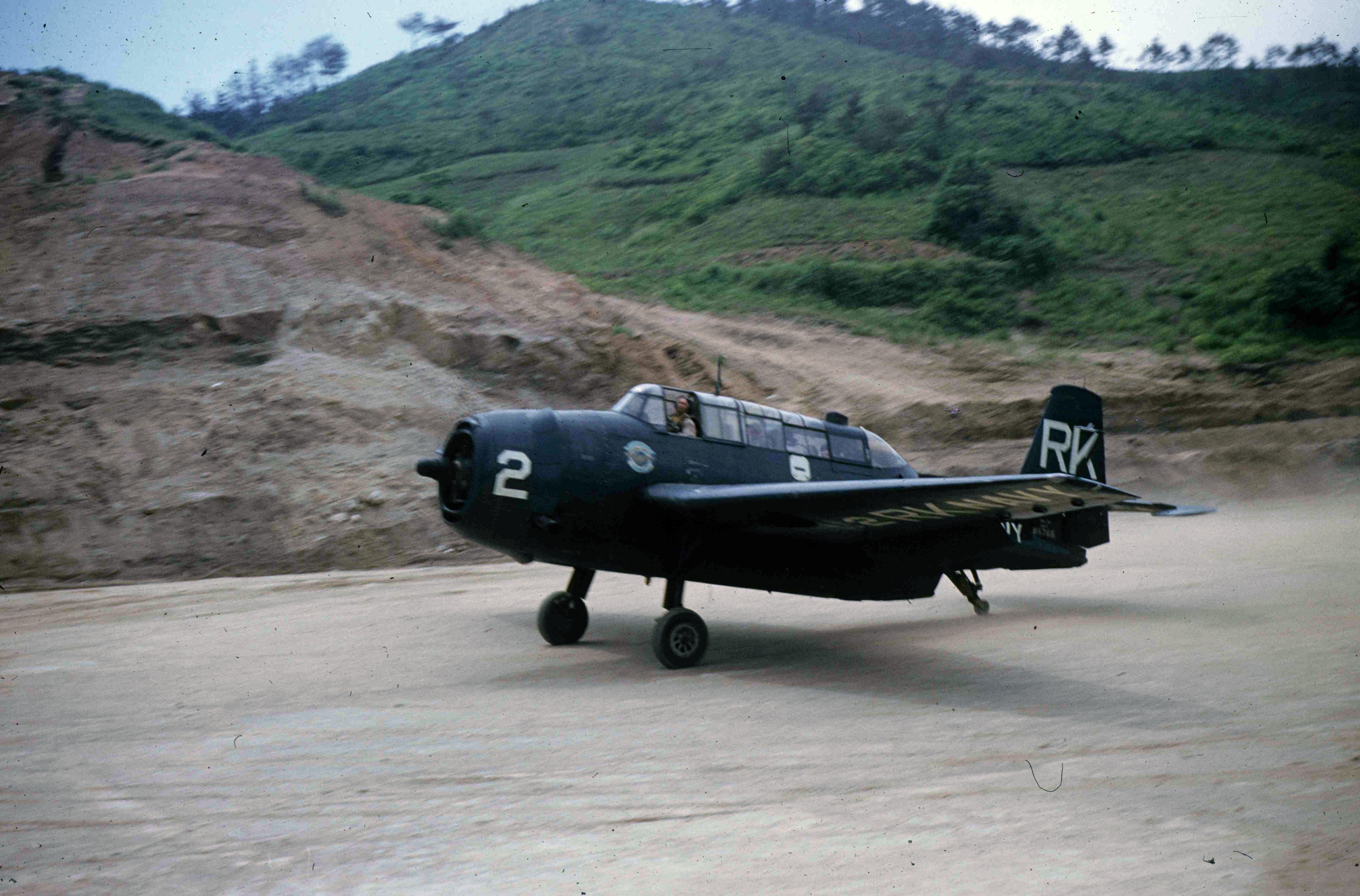
VR-23 TBM-3R on Briscoe Field, June 1953

=== Modern ===
Ryŏdo is now one of 45 tong (neighbourhoods) of Wonsan.

In June 2014 it was reported that North Korean leader Kim Jong-un had recently visited Ryodo to inspect the KPA Ryo Islet Defense Detachment, part of the Large Combined Unit 287.
