= USS George K. MacKenzie =

Gearing-class destroyer

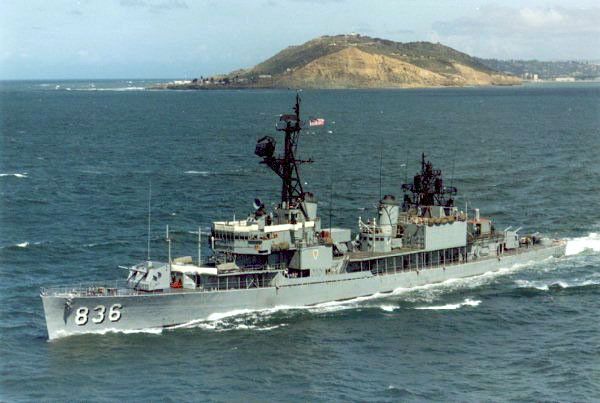
- George K. MacKenzie after FRAM I conversion

History
- Name: USS George K. MacKenzie
- Namesake: George K. MacKenzie
- Builder: Bath Iron Works, Bath, Maine
- Laid down: 21 December 1944
- Launched: 13 May 1945
- Commissioned: 13 July 1945
- Decommissioned: 30 September 1976
- Stricken: 1 October 1976
- Identification: Callsign: NBBI; Hull number: DD-836
- Honors and awards: 6 battle stars (Korea)
- Fate: Sunk as a target, 15 October 1976

General characteristics
- Class & type: Gearing-class destroyer
- Displacement: 2,425 long tons (2,464 t) full
- Length: 390 ft 6 in (119.02 m)
- Beam: 40 ft 10 in (12.45 m)
- Draft: 14 ft 4 in (4.37 m)
- Propulsion: Geared turbines, 2 shafts, 60,000 shp (45 MW)
- Speed: 35 knots (65 km/h; 40 mph)
- Range: 4,500 nmi (8,300 km) at 20 kn (37 km/h; 23 mph)
- Complement: 336
- Armament: Prior to FRAM upgrade : 6 × 5"/38 caliber guns; 12 × 40 mm AA guns; 11 × 20 mm AA guns; 10 × 21 inch (533 mm) torpedo tubes; 6 × depth charge projectors; 2 × depth charge tracks

USS George K. MacKenzie (DD-836) was a Gearing-class destroyer of the United States Navy, named for Lieutenant Commander George K. MacKenzie (1910–1943).

== Namesake ==
George K. MacKenzie was born on 30 May 1910 in Brooklyn, N.Y. He graduated from the United States Naval Academy in 1931. MacKenzie attended the Basic Enlisted Submarine School and Deep Sea Diving School and the advanced course in the Submarine Officers' School in addition to serving on USS Raleigh, USS Bonita and USS Plunger and commanding USS Falcon and USS Triton. Lieutenant Commander MacKenzie was killed in action 15 March 1943 when three Imperial Japanese Navy destroyers sank Triton in waters just north of the Admiralty Islands. He was posthumously awarded the Navy Cross.

== Construction and commissioning ==
George K. MacKenzie was launched on 13 May 1945 by the Bath Iron Works, Bath, Maine; sponsored by Miss Donna MacKenzie, daughter; and commissioned on 13 July 1945.

== Service history ==
=== 1945–1950 ===
After shakedown off Cuba, MacKenzie returned to Boston, Massachusetts on 15 September 1945 and subsequently participated in the Navy Day celebrations on 27 October at Savannah, Georgia She served with the Operational Development Force at Norfolk, Virginia, her home port, and conducted training exercises and escort duties along the Atlantic seaboard until sailing on 5 January 1948 on a goodwill tour to Buenos Aires, Argentina.

MacKenzie returned to Norfolk on 9 February after these duties as a "steel grey diplomat" and continued peacetime operations, highlighted by a Midshipman cruise June to July 1948 to Portugal, Italy, North Africa, and Cuba. In October 1948 the destroyer sailed for the Near East, where she supported the United Nations Palestine Patrol and the allied occupation of Trieste, returning to Newport, Rhode Island for Christmas.

After overhaul at Boston until April 1949, George K. MacKenzie continued peacetime training on the eastern seaboard, and made a "Med" cruise from January to May 1950. When the uneasy truce in the Far East was shattered by the North Korean aggression, MacKenzie was transferred to the Pacific. She arrived Pearl Harbor on 1 July 1950 to prepare for wartime service.

=== Korean War, 1950–1953 ===
During her first tour in Korea, from 26 July 1950 to 30 January 1951, she screened attack carriers during strikes on North Korean targets and provided close support for advancing Allied armies. After a repair period at San Diego, California from 15 February to 17 July 1951, she returned to perform the same vital screening and support duties until April 1952.

George K. MacKenzie provided antisubmarine screening and fired several important bombardment missions at Wonsan Harbor, 16 to 17 January and again 23 February to 21 March 1953 in support of United Nations forces. She lent effective fire support to troops in the vicinity of Suwon Dan from 15 to 19 April 1953 in company with USS Los Angeles and demolished sections of the enemy's railroad along the eastern coast of Korea in May.

=== 1953–1959 ===
Homeported in San Diego and Long Beach, California, she completed a total of nine tours of duty in the Far East, including training exercises and duty with the Taiwan patrol between 1953 and 1959.

=== 1960–1967 ===
George K. MacKenzie's homeport was changed to Yokosuka, Japan, 15 February 1960 as she continued her peacetime training duties, visiting Hong Kong, the Philippines and other Far Eastern ports, including those in Japan. In 1961 MacKenzie sailed from Subic Bay, P.I., on 23 March to rendezvous with carriers Midway (CV-41) and Lexington (CV-16) in the South China Sea to act during the Laos crisis as a powerful on-the-spot force, if needed. Fortunately, the crisis passed; and after further operations George K. MacKenzie put in at her new home port of New York on 11 December 1962. She entered Brooklyn Navy Yard for modernization, returning to sea in October 1963. MacKenzie then made preparations to return to her new homeport of Long Beach, California, where she arrived on 28 January 1964 to prepare for extended duty in the Far East. She left the West Coast on 26 May and reached Yokosuka, Japan, on 13 June to begin over two years of continuous service in Oriental waters operating alternately in Japanese waters and off Vietnam fighting to repel Communist aggression. She specialized in screening aircraft carriers and shelling Communist positions ashore. The battle-tested destroyer returned to Long Beach on 3 August 1966 for a major overhaul to prepare for future action. In mid-1967 she was again in the Far East aiding in the struggle to save Southeast Asia. On 29 July she was screening Forrestal (CVA-59) when fire broke out on the carrier's flight deck. After helping to put out the flames, she escorted the stricken flattop to Subic Bay for repairs.

=== 1968–1970 ===
George K. MacKenzie again changed homeport from Long Beach to Yokosuka, Japan, in July 1968 with Destroyer Squadron Three. The next two years were mostly spent in the waters off Vietnam serving on Yankee Station and providing naval gun fire support to forces in South Vietnam with some time in the Sea of Japan off North Korea. Port visits included Subic Bay, Kaohsiung and Keelung, Taiwan, Hong Kong and Bangkok. CAPT Sherwin J. Sleeper was relieved as Commanding Officer by CDR James A. Allen in May 1969. In July 1970 the entire squadron returned together to San Diego with homeward-bound pennants flying, to be greeted at the pier by Governor Reagan, Senator Murphy, the COMCRUDESPAC Band and several hundred family members and well-wishers. The ship received a Navy Unit Commendation for this period. After a short break the ship moved to the Long Beach Naval Shipyard for a five-month overhaul.

=== 1971–1976 ===
George K. MacKenzie was deployed to Vietnam in 1971 again with the mission of fleet defense and shore bombardment with other vessels, including the cruiser Oklahoma City (CLG-5) USS Newport News} In the Spring of 1972 she participated in Operation Freedom Train conducting shore bombardment of targets in North Vietnam and in operation Linebacker 1 and Linebacker 2 it may be noted here that during this arduous tour of duty she fired 16,549 rounds of 5"/38 ammunition. She returned home to San Diego in August 1972, three months later than planned. She received a second Navy Unit Commendation for this deployment. After a brief stand-down period, she was again selected to conduct a midshipman training cruise with 20 third- and first-class midshipmen embarked. During this training period, the MacKenzie was ordered to perform plane guard duty for the Ranger (CV-61), due to soon rotate back to Vietnam. George K. MacKenzie put to sea to await a rendezvous with the carrier, which was still in port. However, Ranger never sailed because of damage to the #3 main engine reduction gear due to sabotage. To provide at-sea time for the midshipmen, and a time for R&R for the crew, MacKenzie was given permission to sail to Coos Bay, Oregon for the annual Salmon Festival, she then deployed again back to Vietnam to provide NGFS to South Vietnamese forces and saw the war end later the year.

== Decommissioning and disposal ==
George K. MacKenzie was decommissioned on 30 September 1976, and struck from the Naval Vessel Register on 1 October 1976. She was sunk as a target off California on 15 October 1976.

== Awards ==
George K. MacKenzie was awarded six battle stars for Korean service.
