= USS Redstart =

Minesweeper of the United States Navy

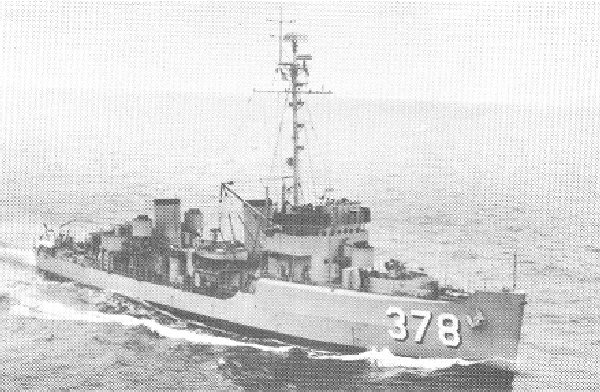

History

United States
- Name: USS Redstart (AM-378)
- Namesake: redstart
- Builder: Savannah Machine and Foundry Co., Savannah, Georgia
- Laid down: 14 June 1944
- Launched: 18 October 1944
- Commissioned: 4 April 1945
- Decommissioned: 26 November 1946
- Recommissioned: 1 December 1950
- Reclassified: MSF-378, 1 March 1955
- Decommissioned: 15 March 1957
- Honours and awards: 1 battle star (World War II); 5 battle stars (Korea)
- Fate: Transferred to Taiwan, 25 July 1963
- Stricken: 1 April 1965

History

Taiwan
- Name: ROCS Wu Sheng (PCE-66) 武勝
- Acquired: 25 July 1963
- Decommissioned: 16 February 1998
- Stricken: 26 February 1998

General characteristics
- Class & type: Auk-class minesweeper
- Displacement: 890 long tons (904 t)
- Length: 221 ft 3 in (67.44 m)
- Beam: 32 ft (9.8 m)
- Draft: 10 ft 9 in (3.28 m)
- Speed: 18 knots (33 km/h; 21 mph)
- Complement: 100 officers and enlisted
- Armament: 1 × 3"/50 caliber gun; 2 × 40 mm guns; 2 × 20 mm guns; 2 × Depth charge tracks

USS Redstart (AM-378/MSF-378) was an Auk-class minesweeper commissioned by the United States Navy for service in World War II. Her task, as a fleet minesweeper, was to clear mines as the fleet proceeded into battle areas.

Redstart was built in Savannah, Georgia by the Savannah Machine and Foundry Co., and was laid down on 14 June 1944, launched on 18 October 1944, and finally commissioned on 4 April 1945.

== Service history ==
=== Post-World War II operations ===
Following a shakedown cruise off the Virginia and Maryland coasts, the ship proceeded through the Panama Canal and berthed at Pipeline Pier in Long Beach, California. For use in her minesweeping operations, the ship carried, on her fantail, towable finned devices called "pigs" because of their size and shape, plus cables with cutters, plus other devices used for removing and destroying mines, such as acoustical hammer and hedgehog weapons. After the towed equipment cut a mine cable, the mine floated to the surface, where the mine would be exploded by fire from an on-board 20 mm or 40 mm gun.

Redstart steamed to Japan by way of Pearl Harbor for post-war minesweeping operations. The war had ended suddenly for the Japanese, causing a shutdown of military activities, and a large number of defensive mines were still in place in various harbors and bays. On one of her mine-clearing operations in Japanese waters at Nagoya Bay, the ship struck an underwater object and damaged her shaft, requiring her to be repaired in a drydock in Kyūshū the port of Sasebo, Japan. During the remainder of her operations in the Japanese area, where she earned one battle star, she berthed in Sasebo, Japan, or Buckner Bay, Okinawa, between assignments. In April 1946, she completed her operations in the Japanese theatre, and returned to Long Beach, California, and was then towed and placed in the reserve fleet in San Diego, California.

=== Korean War ===
Redstart was recommissioned on 1 December 1950. The Korean War was in progress, and she proceeded to the Wonsan operating area where she swept mines and traded artillery fire with shoreside enemy batteries. Beside her minesweeping functions, she served a variety of other purposes, including patrol work, courier duty, escort duty, and establishing a presence offshore at the 38th parallel. On 11 August 1951, in company with Dextrous (AM-341), and on 10 September 1951 in company with Heron (AMS-18), Redstart received enemy fire off the Korean coast and sustained minor damage. In February 1952, after having won five additional battle stars, she sailed from Japan and returned, via Pearl Harbor, to her berth at Pipeline Pier in Long Beach.

Redstart was assigned to local operations off the California coast, including participating in Operation Philbex 1, an amphibious operation off the coast at Oceanside, California. On 1 December 1952, she departed again for the Japanese and Korean theatre and continued her minesweeping activities off the Korean coast, accumulating a total of 81 minesweeping operations, which was a record in the Korean theatre of operations In June 1953, she departed Japan and returned to Long Beach on 3 July 1953.

=== Post-Korea operations ===
On 16 January 1954, with the war now over, Redstart was assigned to another Far East tour. Based out of Sasebo she practiced minesweeping operations off the Korean coast, south of the 38th parallel. She showed her colors in various Far East ports before returning to Long Beach 19 August 1954. During the remainder of 1954, Redstart operated off the California coast. On 4 January 1955, she departed Long Beach for cold weather operations off the coast of Alaska, returning to Long Beach on approximately thirty days later.

Redstart was redesignated MSF-378 on 1 March 1955.

Redstart commenced another tour of the Far East on 7 October 1955, stopping at Pearl Harbor and the Midway Islands for food and fuel before arriving at her temporary home port of Sasebo, Japan, on 4 November 1955. While in the Far East, the ship continued minesweeping practice at Koje Do and Tojang Po on the Korean coast, and participated in mock atomic warfare off the coast of Okinawa. During this tour-of-duty she made ports-of-call at Yokosuka, Japan and Hong Kong, China. From 21 January to 23 January 1956, she participated at Kaoshiung, Formosa, in operations with the Formosan navy with some of her personnel stationed as observers aboard the Formosan warships. On 19 March 1956, the ship set sail from Sasebo, for Long Beach, California, after stopping at Midway Island and at Pearl Harbor for fuel and supplies. She docked again at Pipeline Pier in Long Beach, California Harbor, in California, on 13 April 1956.

== Decommissioning and sale ==
Redstart reported for her deactivation at Astoria, Oregon, on 16 November 1956 and she was deactivated on 15 March 1957. Transferred to the Taiwan Navy on 25 July 1963, where she served as the Wu Sheng (PCE-66), later redesignated PCE-866, she was struck from the Navy List on 1 April 1965.

Wu Sheng was decommissioned by the Republic of China Navy on 16 February 1998, and struck from their naval registry on 26 February 1998.

== Awards ==
Redstart earned one battle star for World War II service and five battle stars for Korean War service.

== See also ==
- Commander Mine Squadron SEVEN
