= USS Brush =

Allen M. Sumner-class destroyer

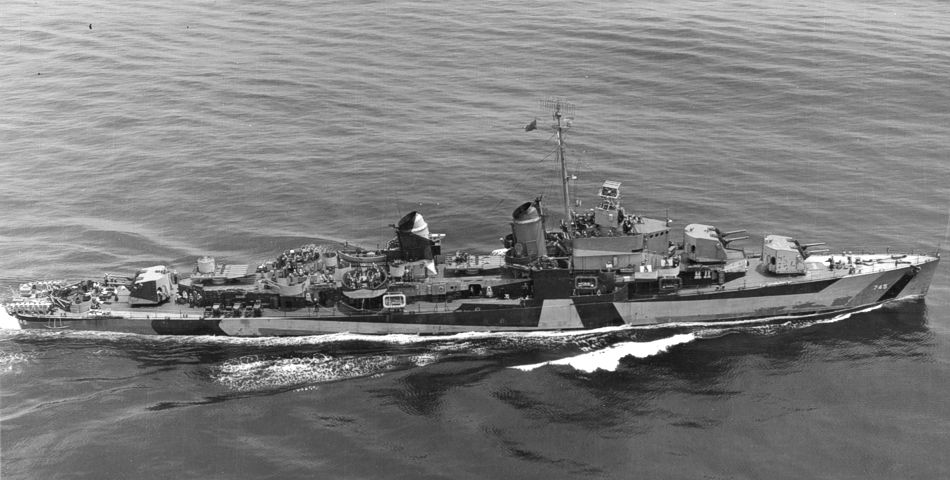
- USS Brush underway on 22 May 1944

History

United States
- Name: Brush
- Namesake: Charles F. Brush
- Builder: Bethlehem Mariners Harbor
- Laid down: 30 July 1943
- Launched: 28 December 1943
- Sponsored by: Mrs. Virginia Perkins
- Commissioned: 17 April 1944
- Decommissioned: 27 October 1969
- Stricken: 27 October 1969
- Identification: Callsign: NKMX; Hull number: DD-745
- Honours and awards: See Awards
- Fate: Sold to Taiwan, 9 December 1969
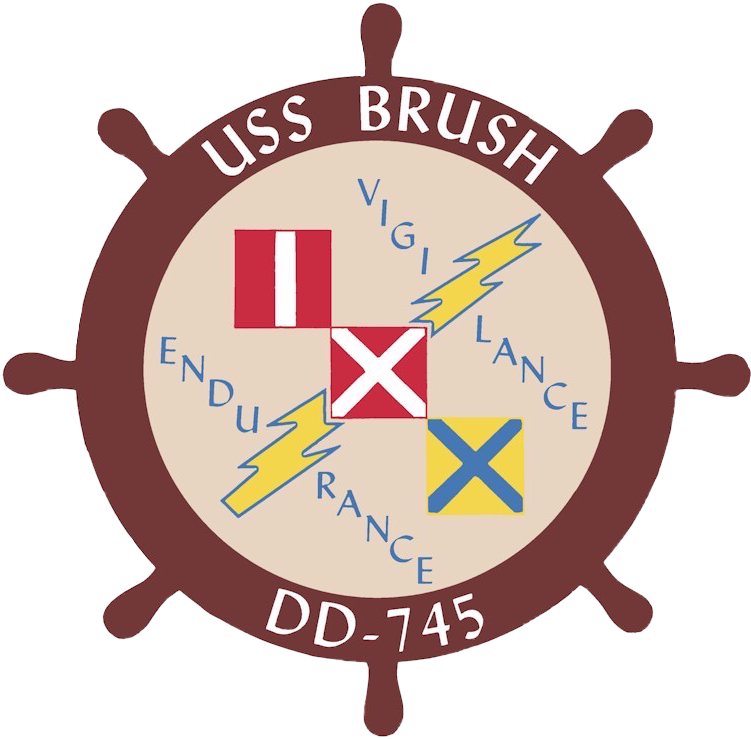
- Badge

Taiwan
- Name: Hsiang Yang; (襄陽)
- Namesake: Hsiang Yang
- Acquired: 9 December 1969
- Commissioned: 25 April 1970
- Identification: Hull number: DD-1
- Reclassified: DD-986, 1980; DD-901; DDG-901
- Decommissioned: 1 September 1984
- Stricken: 1984
- Fate: Scrapped

General characteristics
- Class & type: Allen M. Sumner-class destroyer
- Displacement: 2,200 tons
- Length: 376 ft 6 in (114.76 m)
- Beam: 40 ft (12 m)
- Draft: 15 ft 8 in (4.78 m)
- Installed power: 60,000 shp (45,000 kW)
- Propulsion: 2 propellers; 2 steam turbines
- Speed: 34 knots (63 km/h; 39 mph)
- Range: 6,500 nmi (12,000 km; 7,500 mi) at 15 kn (28 km/h; 17 mph)
- Complement: 336
- Armament: 6 × 5 in (127 mm)/38 cal. guns; 12 × 40 mm guns; 8 × 20 mm cannons; 10 × 21 inch (533 mm) torpedo tubes; 2 × depth charge tracks; 4 × depth charge projectors

USS Brush (DD-745), an Allen M. Sumner-class destroyer, is the only ship of the United States Navy to be named for Charles Brush, an American inventor and philanthropist.

== Construction and career ==
Brush (DD-745) was launched on 28 December 1943 by Bethlehem Steel Co., Staten Island, New York; sponsored by Miss Virginia Perkins, great-granddaughter of Charles Brush; and commissioned on 17 April 1944.

=== Service in the United States Navy ===
==== World War II ====
On 30 August 1944 Brush arrived at Pearl Harbor and after training got underway for Eniwetok, Marshall Islands on 28 September. From Eniwetok she escorted convoys to Ulithi and the Palau Islands.

Serving with the 5th and 3rd Fleets she took part in the Leyte operation (5 November – 16 December 1944); Luzon-Formosa-China coast-Nansei Shoto strikes (3–22 January 1945); invasion of Iwo Jima and the supporting 5th Fleet raids (15 February – 5 March), and Okinawa operation (17 March – 27 April), including 21 April bombardment of Minami Daito Shima. She retired to Ulithi, Caroline Islands, where she lay 30 April – 10 May before joining the 5th Fleet for the projected invasion of Kyushu, Japan. Brush lay at anchor in Leyte Gulf from 13 June to 1 July 1945 and then departed for a raid on the Japanese island of Hokkaidō. On 22 July Brush and other destroyers of her squadron conducted an anti-shipping sweep near the entrance of Tokyo Bay. She remained in this area on air-sea rescue duty until 14 September when she steamed into Tokyo Bay. On 24 September 1945 she left the Far East for the United States.

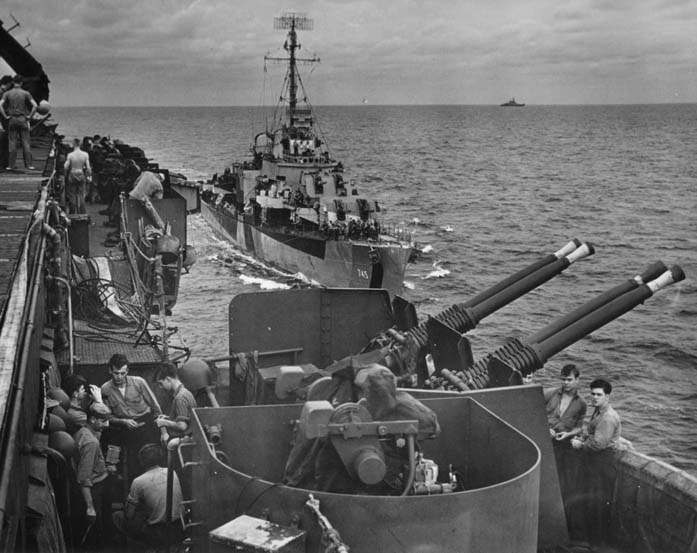
Lexington and Brush heading Ulithi on 25 January 1945

She arrived at Seattle, Washington, 15 October 1945 and operated along the west coast until early 1946 when she departed for Guam. She remained at Guam until 9 March and then steamed to Qingdao, China, arriving on the 19th. With the exception of two voyages to the Philippine Islands, she operated in the East China Sea between Qingdao and Shanghai until January 1947. Brush returned to Guam 18 January 1947 for repairs. Repairs completed 16 February 1947, she sailed to San Diego, via Saipan, Kwajalein, and Pearl Harbor, arriving 24 March. Until May 1950 Brush remained on the west coast participating in local operations, plane guard duties, and type training.

==== Korea ====
In May 1950 she was ordered to the Far East and entered Formosan waters as a unit of TF 77 on 29 June 1950. She screened the carrier units during the United Nations air strikes against North Korea and participated in shore bombardment. On 26 September 1950 while shelling the shore off Tanch'ŏn, Brush struck a mine, ripping her midships section and breaking her keel. Thirteen men were killed and 31 injured. Brush received temporary repairs at Japan and returned under her own power to Puget Sound Naval Shipyard, arriving on 22 December 1950.

Almost a year later Brush departed on her second Korean cruise. She stopped at Pearl Harbor for one month and then joined TF 77 for anti-submarine and anti-aircraft duties off Korea until 25 February 1952. In March Brush was assigned to the Formosan patrol and then participated in hunter-killer exercises off Okinawa. She returned to Japan 12 April and joined the blockade of Korea's west coast with TF's 95 and 77. She returned to San Diego 26 June 1952.

Brush operated off the California coast until February 1953 when she commenced her third Korean cruise. She returned to the United States 30 August.

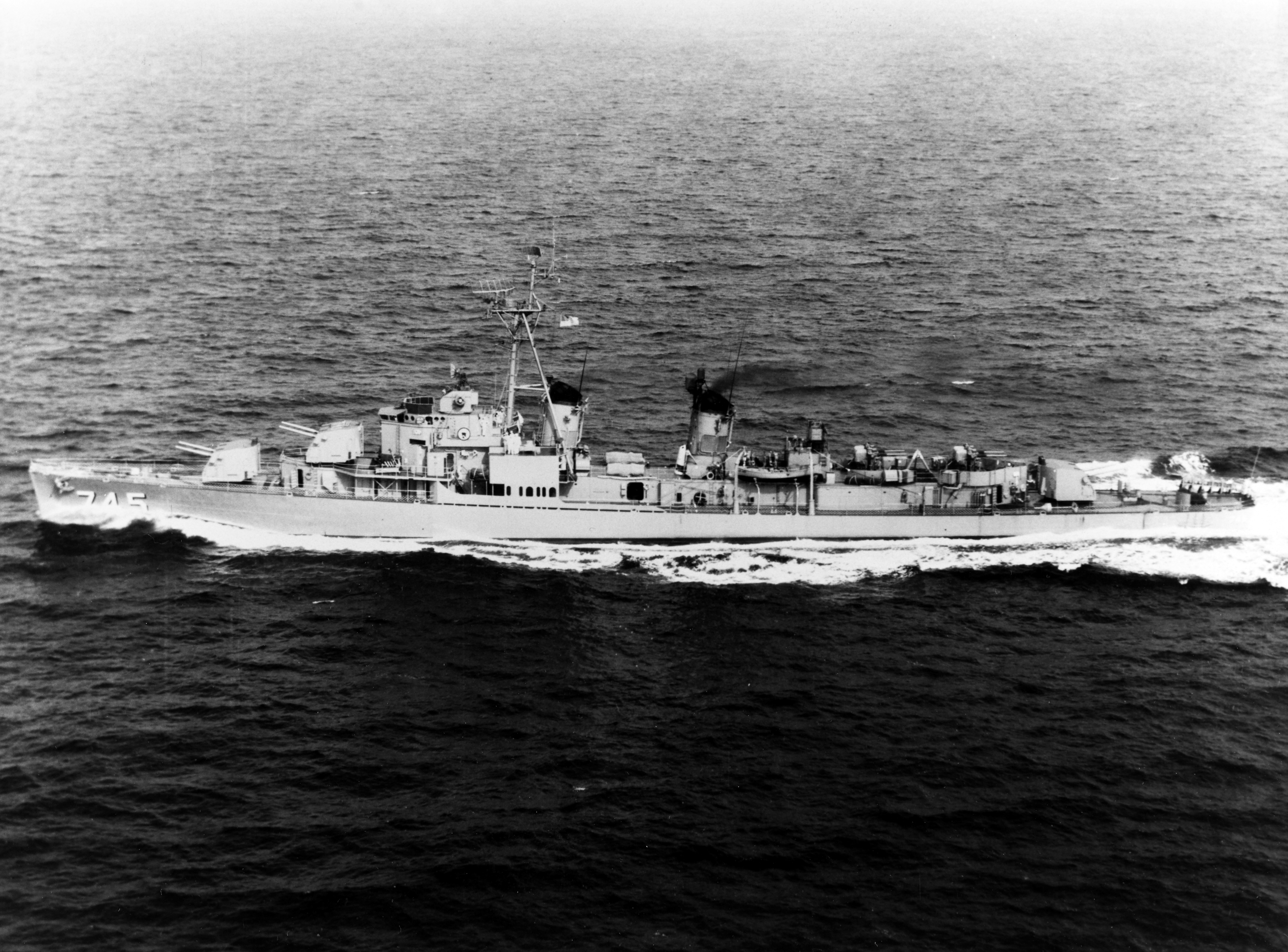
Brush underway at sea in the 1960s

Brush conducted seven more Western Pacific deployments over the next decade (4 May – 5 December 1954; 30 June 1955 – 15 February 1956; 31 August 1957 – 1 March 1958; 25 October 1958 – 22 April 1959; 1 January – 28 July 1960; 29 July 1961 – 9 March 1962; 13 March – 1 October 1964), each involving carrier escort, ASW exercises and the occasional Formosa patrol. During the last 1964 deployment, Brush cruised in the Gulf of Tonkin as American intervention in Vietnam escalated.

Over the next five years, Brush conducted three Vietnam deployments (20 November 1965 – 13 May 1966; 8 April – 6 October 1967; 20 August 1968 – 4 March 1969), each marked by intensive patrol and gunnery operations in the South China Sea.

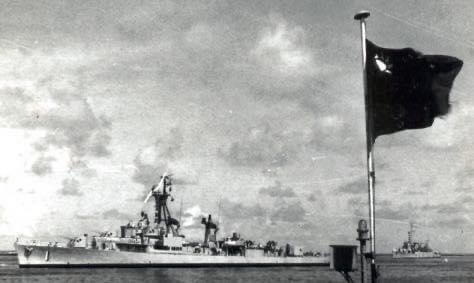
Hsiang Yang, date unknown

Brush was decommissioned and stricken from the register on 27 October 1969. She was subsequently sold to Taiwan on 9 December 1969.

=== Service in the Republic of China Navy ===
The ship was renamed ROCS Hsiang Yang (DD-1) and commissioned on 25 April 1970

The ship's weapon system was gradually modified on the ship. In 1980, the serial number was changed to DD-986. But was later changed to DD-901.

Decommissioned on 1 September 1984 and was later stricken the same year and transferred to Naval Weapons School.

She was finally broken up for scrap.

== Awards ==
Brush received five battle stars for World War II service and four battle stars for her Korean operations.
