= USS Heron (AMS-18) =

Minesweeper of the United States Navy

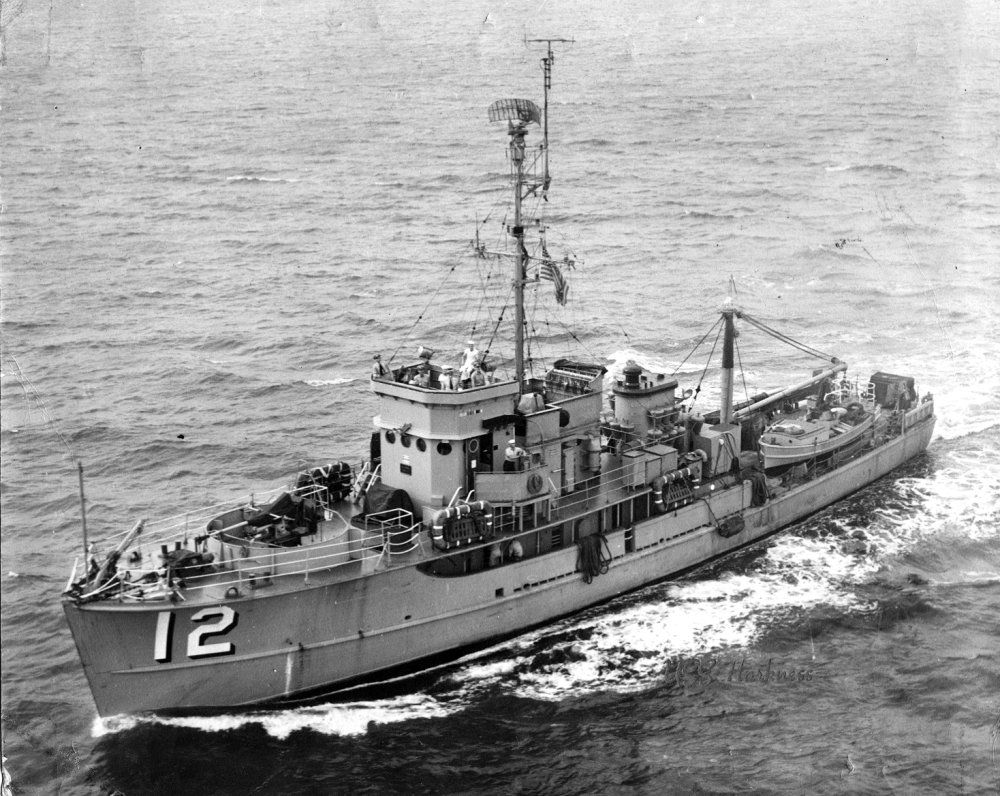
- A YMS-1-class minesweeper

History

United States
- Name: USS YMS-369
- Builder: Wheeler Shipbuilding Corp.; Whitestone, New York
- Laid down: 13 January 1943
- Launched: 24 July 1943
- Sponsored by: Miss Frances J. McCarthy
- Commissioned: 11 October 1943
- Decommissioned: 2 March 1946
- Renamed: USS Heron (AMS-18), 7 February 1947
- Namesake: the heron bird
- Recommissioned: 15 July 1949
- Reclassified: MSC(O)-18, 17 February 1955
- Decommissioned: 21 March 1955
- Honors and awards: 1 battle stars, World War II; 8 battle stars, Korean War
- Fate: transferred to Japan, 21 March 1955
- Acquired: returned from Japan, 31 March 1967
- Stricken: 31 March 1967
- Fate: Used as a fire target

History

Japan
- Name: JDS Nuwajima (MSC-657)
- Acquired: 21 March 1955
- Fate: Returned to U.S. custody, 31 March 1967

General characteristics
- Class & type: YMS-135 subclass of YMS-1-class minesweepers
- Displacement: 215 tons
- Length: 136 ft (41 m)
- Beam: 24 ft 6 in (7.47 m)
- Draft: 6 ft (1.8 m)
- Propulsion: 2 × 880 bhp General Motors 8-268A diesel engines; 2 shafts
- Speed: 13 knots (24 km/h)
- Complement: 50
- Armament: 1 × 3"/50 caliber gun mount; 2 × 20 mm guns; 2 × depth charge projectors

USS Heron (MSC(O)-18/AMS-18/YMS-369) was a YMS-1-class minesweeper of the YMS-135 subclass built for the United States Navy during World War II.

Heron was laid down as YMS-369 on 13 January 1943 by Wheeler Shipbuilding Corp., Whitestone, New York, and launched 24 July 1943. The sponsor was Miss Frances J. McCarthy, an employee of the firm. The YMS was commissioned 11 October 1943.

The minesweeper's World War II service in the American Theatre of operations consisted of minesweeping and escort duty in the Gulf of Mexico and Caribbean while based in Key West; in the Gulf of Maine while based in Portland; and sweeping the approaches to New York City while based in Tompkinsville. Pacific operations included sweeping around the home islands after the Japanese surrender. On 2 March 1946, she sailed for home after 4 months in Japanese waters and was decommissioned. She was named USS Heron and reclassified AMS-18 7 February 1947.

After recommissioning 15 July 1949, Heron engaged in training exercises on the U.S. West Coast until 4 October 1950, when she sailed for Korean War duty. She patrolled off the Korean Peninsula and was of invaluable assistance for her clearing of channels for blockading ships in the siege of Wonsan Harbor in March 1951.

Heron received superficial damage after being hit by a shore battery at Wonsan, North Korea, no casualties, 10 September 1951.

She maintained surveillance of North Korean sea traffic after the Armistice until January 1954, when she retired to Sasebo, Japan, for training duties.

Reclassified MSC(O)-18 on 17 February 1955, Heron decommissioned again 21 March, and was turned over to the Japanese Maritime Self Defense Force the same day to serve as Nuwajima (MSC-657).

Heron was returned to U.S. Navy custody 31 March 1967, struck from the Naval Vessel Register the same day, and used as a fire target by the Japanese Maritime Staff Office.

== Awards and honors ==
Heron earned one battle star for World War II service, and eight battle stars for her participation in the Korean War.
