= USS Dextrous (AM-341) =

Minesweeper of the United States Navy

History

United States
- Name: HMS Sepoy (BAM-30)
- Builder: Gulf Shipbuilding Corp., Chickasaw, Alabama
- Renamed: USS Dextrous (AM-341)
- Launched: 17 June 1943
- Commissioned: 8 September 1943
- Decommissioned: 5 June 1946
- Recommissioned: 1 December 1950
- Reclassified: MSF-341, 7 February 1955
- Decommissioned: 31 October 1956
- Honours and awards: 5 battle stars (World War II); 5 battle stars (South Korea)
- Fate: Transferred to South Korea in December 1967

History

South Korea
- Name: ROKS Koje (PCE-1003)
- Acquired: December 1967
- Fate: Unknown

General characteristics
- Class & type: Auk-class minesweeper
- Displacement: 890 long tons (904 t)
- Length: 221 ft 3 in (67.44 m)
- Beam: 32 ft (9.8 m)
- Draft: 10 ft 9 in (3.28 m)
- Speed: 18 knots (33 km/h; 21 mph)
- Complement: 100 officers and enlisted
- Armament: 1 × 3"/50 caliber gun; 2 × 40 mm guns; 2 × 20 mm guns; 2 × Depth charge tracks

USS Dextrous (AM-341) was an Auk-class minesweeper built for the United States Navy which served in World War II, the Korean War, and beyond. She was later transferred to the Republic of Korea Navy where she served as ROKS Koje (PCE-1003).

The ship was laid down by the Gulf Shipbuilding Corp., Chickasaw, Alabama as HMS Sepoy (BAM-30), renamed and reclassified USS Dextrous (AM-341), and launched on 17 June 1943; sponsored by Miss S. S. Kenney; and commissioned 8 September 1943.

== Service history ==
=== World War II ===
Dextrous sailed from Norfolk, Virginia, 14 November 1943 as a convoy escort, arriving at Bizerte, Tunisia, 3 January 1944. Ten days later she sailed for Naples, Italy, to sweep in the Gulf of Salerno. On 21 January she left Naples for the Anzio-Nettuno beachhead where she swept mines prior to the assault the next day, and patrolled and provided anti-aircraft fire during the bitter fighting ashore. Except for two voyages to Bizerte to replenish, Dextrous served off Anzio until 12 August 1944 when she sailed from Naples for pre-invasion minesweeping off the southern coast of France. She swept and patrolled there until 1 October when she put into Bizerte. Escorting a convoy of LSTs, she returned to Norfolk, Virginia, 11 December for overhaul.

Dextrous sailed from Norfolk, Virginia, 15 February 1945 for the Pacific Ocean, arriving at Pearl Harbor 18 March. She aided in the training of submarines in the Hawaiian Islands until 23 May, when she sailed west. After calling at Guam to remove some experimental gear, she reached Okinawa on 14 July to join the minesweeping operations coordinated with the U.S. 3rd Fleet's final raids on Japan.

After the war Dextrous remained in the Far East, clearing minefields in Japanese waters until 15 January 1946 when she sailed from Sasebo, Japan, for the U.S. West Coast. She arrived at San Pedro, California, 22 February and was placed out of commission in reserve 5 June 1946.

=== Korean War ===
Recommissioned 1 December 1950 for service in the Korean War, Dextrous made her first Far Eastern cruise from 3 March 1951 to 28 February 1952. She patrolled and swept on both coasts of Korea. Often under fire from shore batteries which hit her three times, Dextrous captured two sampans and five prisoners-of-war. She returned to Korean waters for similar duty from 1 December 1952 to 3 July 1953.

=== Post-war operations ===
Following the cease fire in Korea Dextrous made cruises to the western Pacific in 1954 and 1955-56 during which she patrolled off Korea, and participated in various exercises with the Fleet. Alternating with this duty were local exercises out of her home port at Long Beach, California, and a cruise along the west coast to San Francisco, California and Seattle, Washington, in the summer of 1955.

Dextrous was again placed out of commission in reserve on 31 October 1956. She was reclassified MSF-341, 7 February 1955. In December 1967, the ship was transferred to South Korea where she served as ROKS Koje (PCE-1003).

== Awards ==
Dextrous received five battle stars for World War II service and five for Korean War service.
