= Bombardment of Cherbourg =

1944 naval operation off Normandy

- Part of World War II, Operation Neptune–Operation Overlord
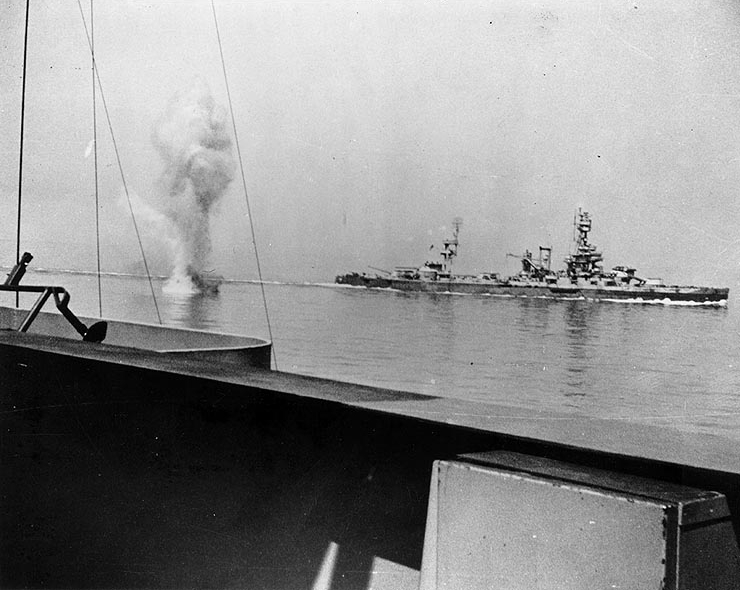
- A heavy German coast artillery shell falls between USS Texas (background) and USS Arkansas while they duel with Battery Hamburg
Date	June 25, 1944
Location	Cherbourg, France 49.65°N 01.63°W
Result	Allied victory

Belligerents
United States; United Kingdom	Germany

Commanders and leaders
(United States) Morton Deyo	(Nazi Germany) Karl-Wilhelm von Schlieben

Strength
3 battleships 2 heavy cruisers 2 light cruisers 11 destroyers 3 minesweeper squadrons	20 casemated batteries Battery Hamburg; German "fortress" status elements of 4 divisions
- Cherbourg-Octeville, a commune on the Cotentin Peninsula in the Manche department of Lower Normandy, in north-western France.

The bombardment of Cherbourg took place on June 25, 1944, during World War II, when ships from the United States Navy and the British Royal Navy attacked German fortifications in and near the city, firing in support of U.S. Army units that were engaged in the Battle of Cherbourg. In doing so, the Allied naval forces engaged in a series of duels with coastal batteries and provided close support to infantry as they fought to gain control of the city. The bombardment was initially scheduled to last just two hours but it was later extended by an hour to support army units attempting to break into Cherbourg's city streets. After the bombardment, German resistance lasted until June 29, when the port was captured by the Allies. Afterwards, the task of clearing the port for use lasted several weeks.

When the Allies secured a bridgehead in the Normandy landings, the Germans adopted a strategy to bottle up the Allied forces in Normandy and deny them the nearest major port at Cherbourg to starve them of supplies. By mid-June U.S. infantry had sealed off the Cotentin Peninsula, but their advance had stalled and the Germans began to demolish the port's facilities. In response, the Allies renewed their efforts to capture the city, and by June 20 three infantry divisions under General "Lightning Joe" Collins had advanced within a mile of German lines defending Cherbourg. Two days later, the general assault began and on June 25, a large naval task force began a concentrated bombardment of the town to help neutralize the threat of German coastal artillery and to provide support to the assaulting infantry.

The task force was divided into two groups, each consisting of a variety of warships including battleships, cruisers, destroyers and minesweepers. Each ship was assigned a series of land-based targets. German shells were accurate out to 15,000 yd (14,000 m), and in some cases they were able to bracket the radically maneuvering ships. Several Allied ships were holed, but faulty ammunition hampered German efforts. In several encounters, after being hit the heavy ships were able to withdraw after Allied destroyers obscured them with smoke.

After the action, Allied reports agreed that the most effective aspect of the bombardment was the fire that was provided by the small ships. Under the direction of army spotters, these ships were able to engage point targets up to 2,000 yd (1,800 m) inland, which proved invaluable in providing close support to the assaulting Allied infantry. In contrast, while the force's heavy guns disabled 22 of 24 assigned navy targets, they were unable to destroy any of them and, consequently, infantry assaults were required to ensure that the guns could not be reactivated.

== Background ==
Once German commanders assessed the Allied assault at Normandy as the primary invasion, they sought to limit the lodgment while they prepared a counter-offensive. To preserve naval assets, the Cherbourg-based German E-boats were transferred to Saint-Malo. Four destroyers from Brest made for Cherbourg to follow the E-boats, but they were sunk or disabled. By June 14, the Germans were attempting to deny the Allies use of Cherbourg's major port facility by blocking, mining and demolishing its harbor. The violent English Channel storm that thrashed apart the artificial port Mulberry A raged until June 22. Logistic movement ashore was temporarily crippled, and the Allies desperately needed Cherbourg's port in their possession.

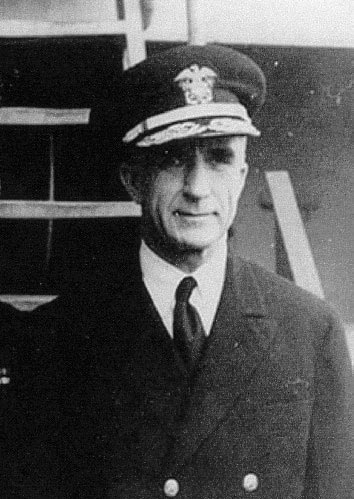
Adm. Morton Deyo
Bombardment Force

Gen. "Pete" Quesada
Ninth Air Force

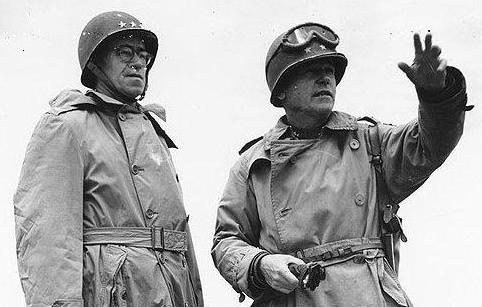
Gen. Omar Bradley, First Army (left)
Gen. "Lightning Joe" Collins, VII Corps

From June 18 the Cotentin Peninsula was sealed off by Allied infantry, but the German line was stabilized and the American advance stalled. Cherbourg held a garrison of 40,000 with a new commander (as of June 23), Generalleutnant Karl-Wilhelm von Schlieben. Hitler believed that the Allied invasion would fail without Cherbourg, and ordered it be made impregnable, awarding it "fortress" status. The American ground forces would lose over 2,800 dead and 13,500 wounded conquering it.

The Germans had emplaced coastal guns in and around Cherbourg in twenty casemated batteries—fifteen were 150 mm (6 in) or greater, and three were 280 mm (11 in). There were many 75 and 88 mm (3.0 and 3.5 in) guns, some of which could be trained inland towards advancing infantry. To support the ground assault, Rear Admiral Morton Deyo began putting together a naval bombardment plan on June 15. While planning went forward, a late June storm raged in the English Channel, scattering Deyo's task force out to open sea and into British ports; they reassembled in Portland Harbour, Dorset. On the Cotentin Peninsula, the U.S. Army VII Corps advance, after some progress, was stalled by entrenched German resistance. The proposed naval bombardment was complicated, because the advance of the 9th, 79th and 4th divisions had brought them to within a mile of the city. An army liaison officer aboard USS Tuscaloosa representing General "Lightning Joe" Collins (VII Corps) expedited communications between different services and commands. The navy-only operation with a three-hour bombardment was shortened to ninety minutes. The targets were limited to those chosen by the army.

== Combined Task Force ==
To support the Allied advance over the Cotentin Peninsula and their planned assault on the German fortifications, on June 25, 1944, a bombarding force (CTF 129, Twelfth Fleet) was organized under the command of Rear Admiral Morton Deyo, USN. It was to suppress coastal batteries that the Germans might turn on advancing infantry, and support infantry calls for fire. The navy was additionally tasked to coordinate with the army air force bombers to interdict ammunition resupply and, as infantry closed, follow direction from spotter planes. (Note: Combined Task Force, CTF 122 was dissolved and command of U.S.N. OVERLORD Forces reverted to Commander, 12th Fleet as of 0001, 10 July 1944.)

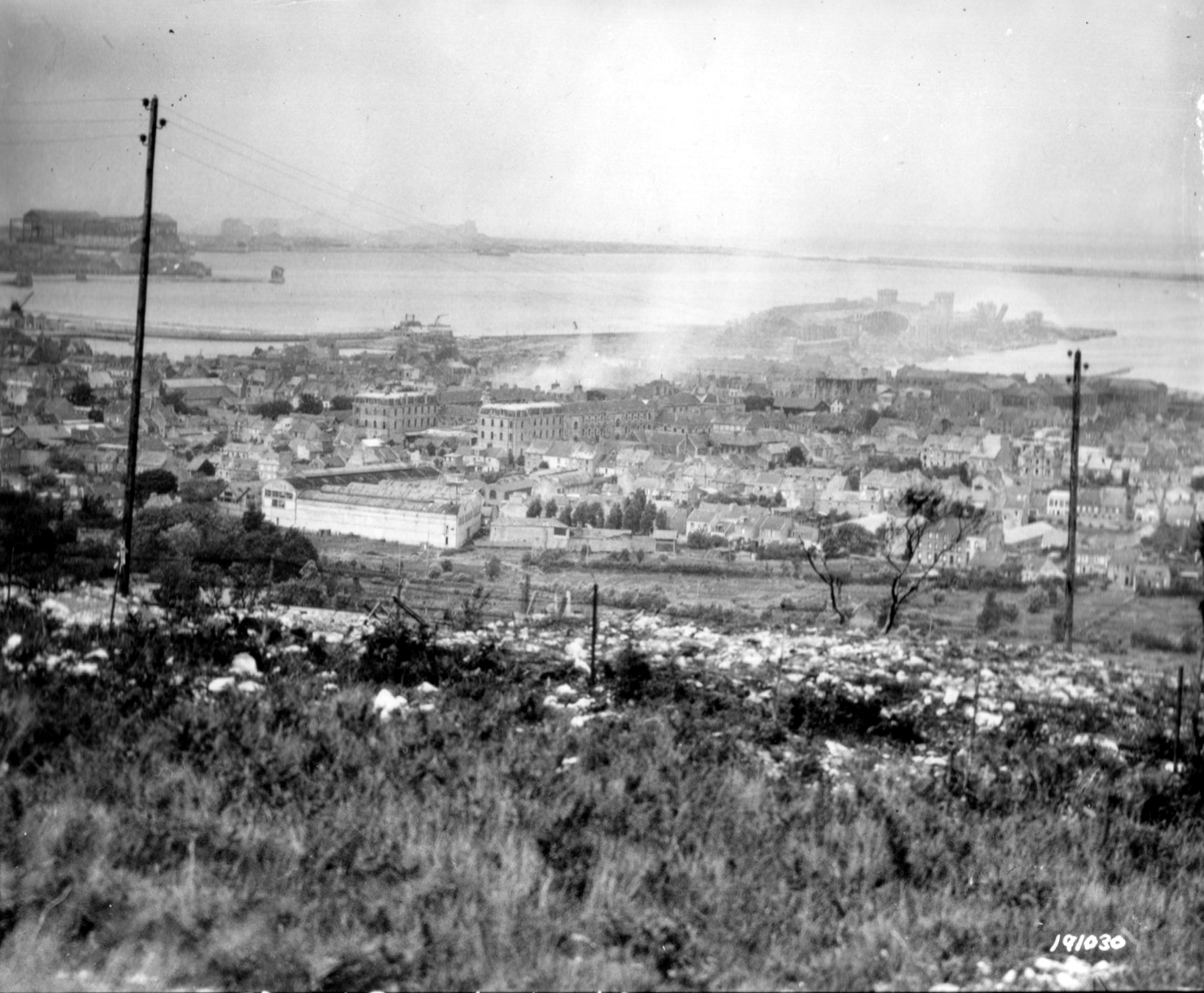
Cherbourg port from land

Map of Cherbourg, port and forts

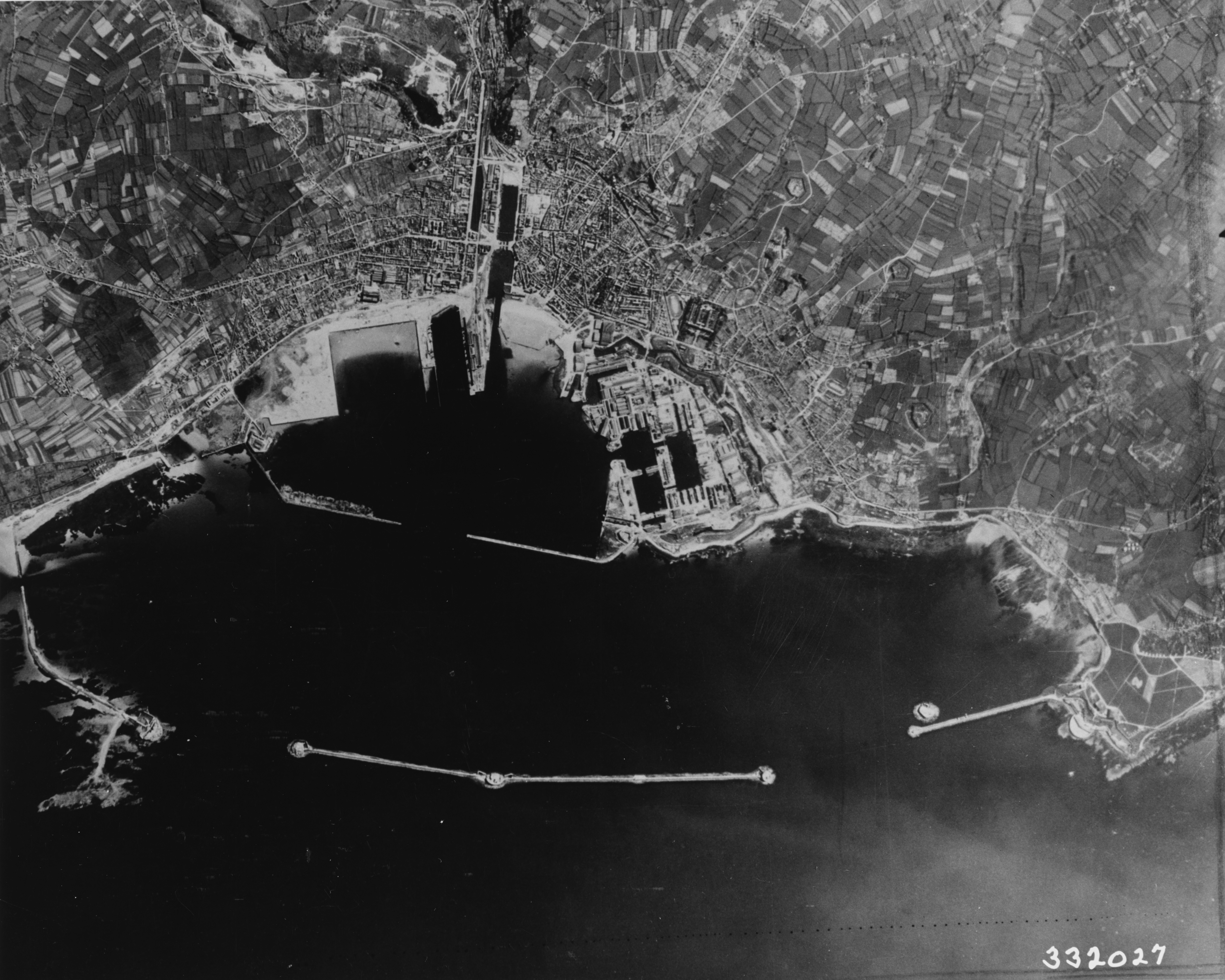
Aerial view of Cherbourg port

=== Battle groups 1 and 2 ===
The task force was divided into two divisions: Battle Group 1 and Battle Group 2. Battle Group 1, under Deyo's command, was assigned to bombard Cherbourg, the inner harbor forts, and the area west towards the Atlantic. Group 1 consisted of the battleship USS Nevada, the cruisers USS Tuscaloosa, USS Quincy, HMS Glasgow, and HMS Enterprise, and six destroyers: USS Ellyson (flag), USS Hambleton, USS Rodman, USS Emmons, USS Murphy, and USS Gherardi. Rear Admiral Carleton Fanton Bryant's smaller Battle Group 2 was assigned "Target 2", the Battery Hamburg, which was located near Fermanville, inland from Cape Levi, 6 mi (9.7 km) east of Cherbourg. Nevada in Group 1 was to use its main battery to silence what was described as "the most powerful German strongpoint on the Cotentin Peninsula". (Note: The German Battery Hamburg, located six miles inland, had four 279 mm (11 in) guns, well separated, protected by steel shields similar to naval gun turrets, and reinforced concrete casemates. It was manned by naval gunners. Supporting them nearby were six 88 mm (3 in), six heavy and six light antiaircraft guns. The battery was distinguished by long range, 40,000 yd (37,000 m), and the arc of train. The guns were sited to cover the westerly sea approaches to Cherbourg. They had an easterly limit of fire.)) Battle Group 2 would then complete the destruction, and pass westward to join Deyo's group. Bryant's Group 2 consisted of the battleships USS Texas, USS Arkansas, and five destroyers. These were USS Barton (flag), USS O'Brien, USS Laffey, USS Hobson (pennant), and USS Plunkett.

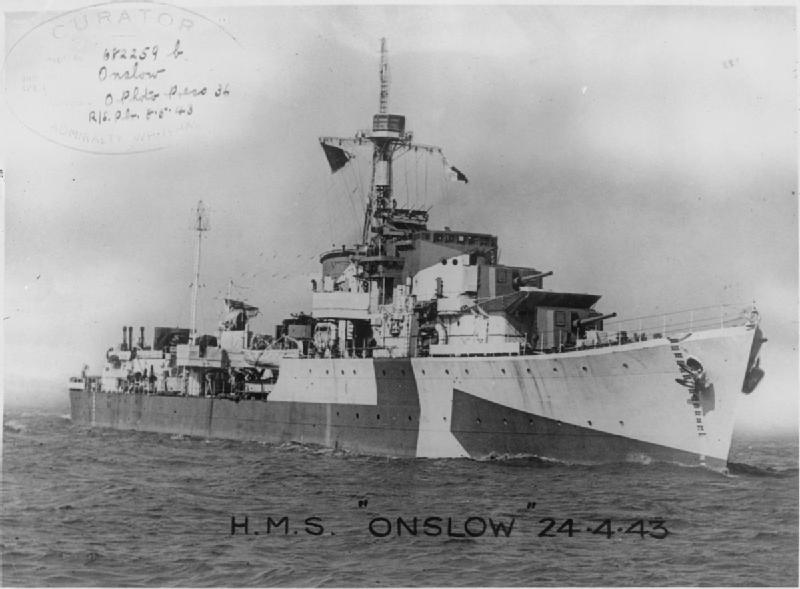
HMS Onslow, destroyers on anti-sub screen had air cover from Ninth Air Force

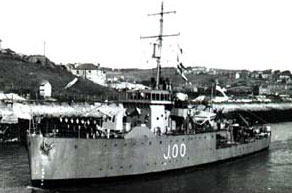
HMS Bangor, minesweepers leading Group 1 took first German coastal fires, "straddling" them

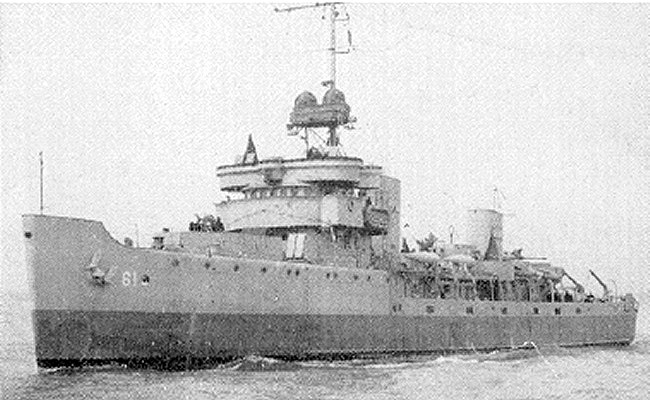
USS Pheasant, minesweepers cleared lanes for battleship Texas, dispersed by casemated guns

=== Air and naval support ===
To clear the path to the shore for the task force, US Minesweeping Squadron 7 and the British 9th Minesweeping Flotilla were tasked with sweeping lanes ahead of them for mines. Channel "L" was extended beyond the extent used for D-Day landings along east and north coasts of Cherbourg to protect Task Force 129 closing in for bombardment. The minesweepers repeatedly came under fire from shore batteries during their operations. During the bombardment, as the batteries were silenced, minesweepers cleared channels towards the harbor seaward from the 10 fathom line. (Note: Subsequently minesweepers of the two U.S. YMS squadrons, the 167th BYMS, and 206th MMS Flotillas assisted in clearing the anchorages and berths. Cherbourg port was free of mines and was receiving ships by 19 July.) Overhead, General "Pete" Quesada's Ninth Air Force was tasked with providing fighter cover. Additional aircraft provided antisubmarine and combat air patrols. Grumman TBF Avengers of the British Royal Navy's Fleet Air Arm, supplemented an additional British six-destroyer anti-submarine screen and the British 159th Minesweeping Flotilla.

=== Fire control measures ===
As a result of pre-bombardment concerns by ground commanders, all planned long-range shots on seaward batteries were cancelled and it was decided that only call fires would be delivered. Inter-service negotiations made three batteries dedicated navy targets and added any batteries firing on the ships. The ships were to have spotter planes over Cherbourg targets. During ship approaches from 09:40 until 12:00 they were to fire only if fired on. Infantry fire-coordination was provided in the air and on the ground. P-38 Lightnings of the Ninth Air Force flew from southern England for naval combat air patrol, fighter-bomber strikes and on-call close support of the infantry. Collins, commanding VII Corps, arranged for shore fire control parties to join infantry units as they approached German fortified objectives.

During the Normandy landings the standard operating procedure for "shore fire control parties" (SFCP) called for nine per infantry division. A naval gunfire liaison officer was attached to each regimental fire control center. A naval gunfire officer was attached to each divisional headquarters in charge of all shore parties in his division. (Note: Each shore party had a table of organization of one army officer, one naval officer and twelve enlisted. Each SFCP had a table of equipment calling for a jeep, an M.14 half-track, and both FM and AM radio transmitter-receiver.)

Every firing ship was provided with an army artillery officer to maintain current information about the position of Allied troops, and to determine whether to fire at any given target at the time. The army liaison officer decided the safety of firing at each target, while the "ship itself controlled the fire". The SFCP observed the fall of shot and corrected fire with a clock code. "In all cases, it was the responsibility of the ship to determine whether any given shoot would endanger allied personnel or positions." This was possible because each bombarding ship was provided with an army officer who tracked positions of Allied forces ashore.

Air spotters operated in pairs, one as a spotter, one as an escort, each capable of both missions. Each pair could communicate with one another and with the same ships. Every bombarding ship was provided radio capability to communicate with all varieties of aircraft radios. The third method of fire control involved a combination of air to ground to sea communication. "Army air observation" planes spotted for a control party on the ground. They relayed the information to the ships taking fire missions. (Note: Delays in spotter coverage was eliminated by maintaining a few aircraft loitering over the combat area. Reliefs were briefed in the air on the way to assigned sectors, allowing for battlefield developments during transit. Aircraft shortages required one plane to spot for two or more ships. "Army air observation" posts were light aircraft such as Piper Cubs or Austers.)

== Bombardment ==
=== Initial stages ===
At 09:40, Group 1 made landfall, about 15 mi (24 km) north of Cherbourg. Leading minesweepers cleared approach channels for both battle groups with Group 2's column steaming parallel several miles to the east. They arrived into the seaward fire support areas without being fired on or receiving any calls for fire. As noon passed at eight bells, the task force plodded towards the in-shore fire support areas at the minesweepers' five-knot (9 km/h; 6 mph) speed. German salvos from a village three miles (4.8 km) west of Cherbourg at Querqueville began falling among the deployed minesweeper flotillas. Four British Fairmile C motor gun boats began making a smoke screen for the approaching minesweepers. HMS Glasgow and HMS Enterprise with Spitfire spotters began returning fire on the German batteries firing on the minesweepers. In just thirty minutes, every minesweeper had been straddled with battery fire, though none were hit. Deyo recalled them, and they would lay-to out of range for the rest of the action.

At 09:55, Bryant's Group 2 entered Fire Support Area 2. Spotter planes for Texas and Arkansas were on target, ready to open fire, and operation plans called for Nevada to begin firing on Target 2, Battery Hamburg. Deyo's flash message surprised Bryant cancelling Nevada's long-range bombardment, postponing his open-firing until noon at shore request or in self-defense, and Group 2 was to join Group 1 by noon. (Note: At 10:34 Group 2 headed west-south-west toward Fire Support Area 3 north of Cherbourg, with Minesweeper Squadron 7 leading screened by three destroyers while two destroyers stayed back with the battleships.)

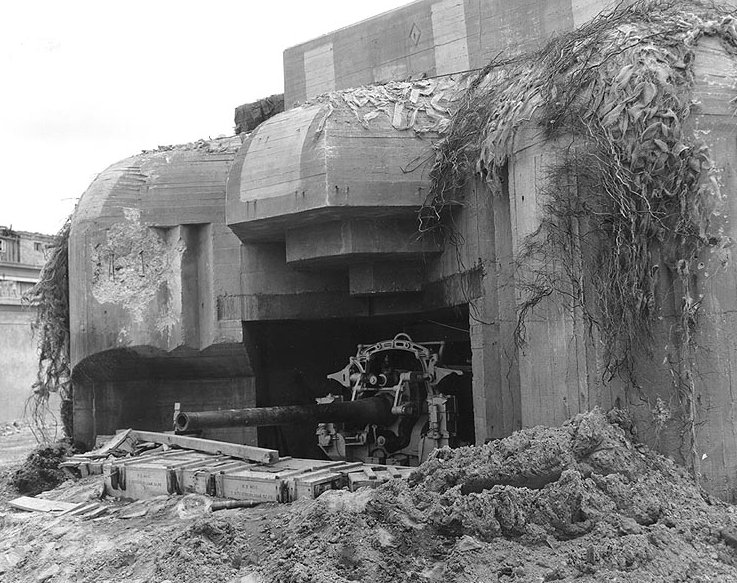
Naval guns dueled casemated artillery while supporting infantry of VII Corps

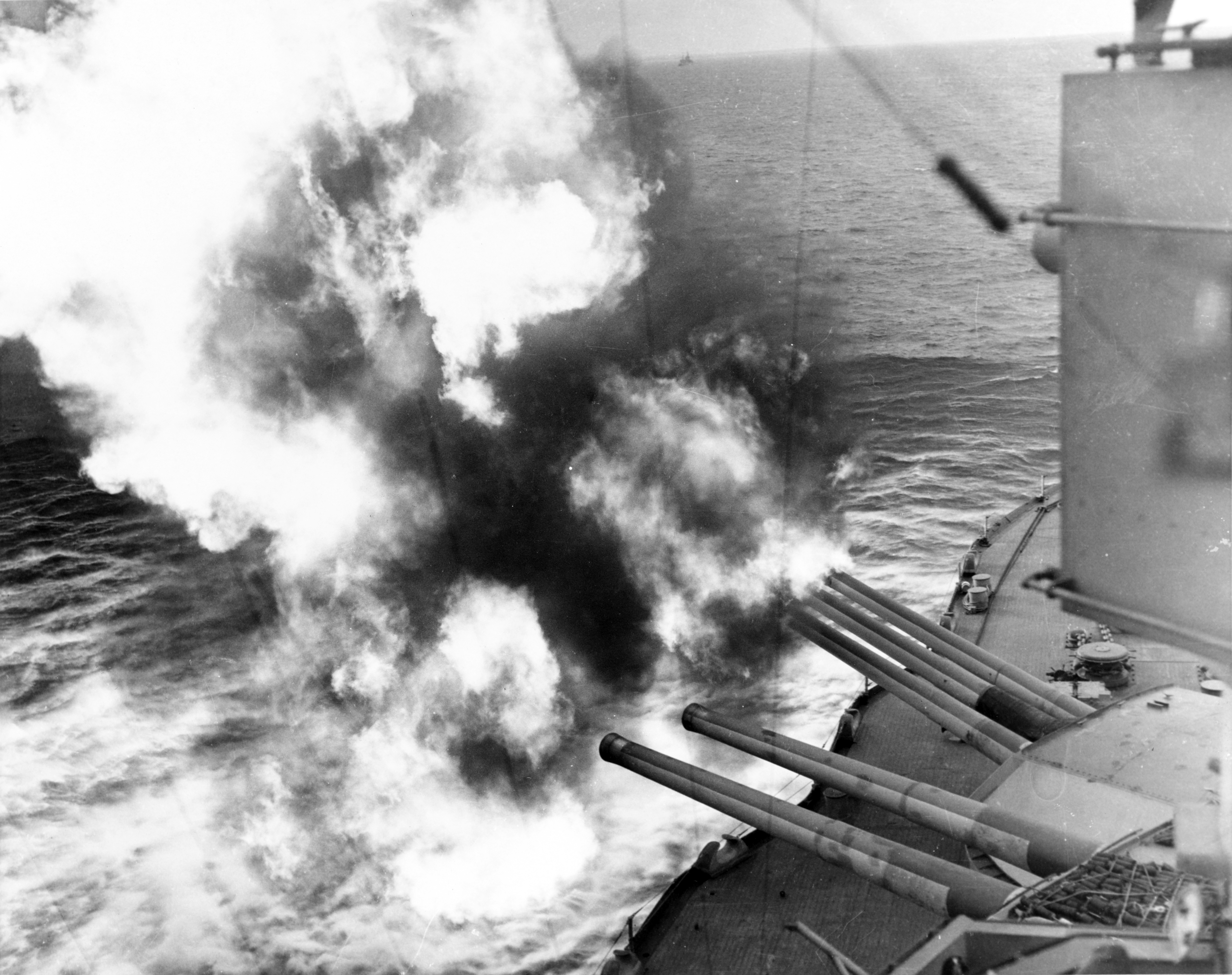
Army air controlled gunnery blew "tanks into scrap" and "pillboxes were powdered"

American troops had overrun two smaller targets, and spotters described them as "surrounded by dead Germans". The strong currents off Normandy slowed the battleships behind minesweepers drifting off course in the current. Arkansas established radio contact with its shore fire control party, closed range to 18,000 yd (16,000 m) and opened fire on Battery Hamburg with her antiquated fire control system. (Note: Arkansas was equipped with second-hand pieces and parts for fire control from USS Tennessee. The gyro-compasses handed down from Tuscaloosa, were always troublesome, and with rapid maneuvering they were disabled. To fire underway, the ship kept to a steady course and fired slowly.) Texas could not connect with her shore party and so stayed in line with the minesweepers. Arkansas's salvos did no damage, so as Group 2 steamed into the battery's arc of fire, the German guns were able to fire. The minesweepers were all bracketed. The destroyer Barton was holed with a ricochet dud from another battery that landed in her aft diesel room. She returned fire on the disclosed battery without air or shore spotting. All minesweepers were splashed with near misses. The destroyer Laffey took a dud in her port bow by the anchor. The damage control party pried it loose and tossed it overboard.

Group 2 now began firing generally at Battery Hamburg, which was obscured by smoke. Texas was straddled by three rounds at her bow, swung starboard with full right rudder, and missed three shells over her stern. Maneuvering, she was straddled at intervals of twenty to thirty seconds by a newly uncovered battery just northeast of Battery Hamburg. The large battery itself was focusing on minesweepers and destroyers. The destroyer O'Brien was hit at her bridge, knocking out her radar, and so sailed out to sea through a smoke screen blind. Minesweepers and the three damaged destroyers were recalled, the destroyers firing their five-inch (127 mm) guns as harassing fire until out of range.

At 12:20, Group 1 destroyers laid smoke to protect the heavy ships in Fire Support Area 3, then closed nearer to the shore to gain more effective fire on the Querqueville Battery. German fire concentrated on HMS Glasgow and Enterprise, hitting Glasgow twice, but she was able to rejoin. After two hours of dueling, all four German guns were temporarily neutralized. Air spot followed the operations at the landing beaches. Pairs of Spitfires, including pilots off the heavy ships, were to loiter 45 minutes over their target. Only half were able to reach the area, the others were driven off by flak, turned away with engine trouble, or could not navigate to the target assignment. Soon after, Texas was struck by a German 280 mm (11 in) shell which hit the top of the ship's armored conning tower. The shell did not penetrate the armor but did explode, ripping up the deck of the bridge. The helmsman of the ship, a 21-year-old quartermaster, 3rd Class Christen Norman Christensen, was centered directly below the blast and was killed, the first and last combat fatality to occur on board. The captain, Charles Adams Baker, was outside the bridge when the ship was hit and escaped the blast unharmed. Soon after the order was given to abandon bridge and the surviving members made it down to the armored conning tower to continue the battle.

At 12:12, the first call for fire came in from VII Corps shore fire control parties. Following their corrections, Nevada and Quincy took out the fortified target in 25 minutes. They continued with targets of opportunity for about three hours. Tuscaloosa was distributing its fire among targeted strong points directed by shore fire control, when flak hit its two Spitfires and they were forced to retire. In the first hour, Ellyson identified coastal battery fire nearby the town of Gruchy. Glasgow and her air spot silenced it with 54 rounds. The destroyer Emmons answered the fire on Fort De l'Est on one of the harbor breakwaters, but by the time the target was silenced, a well camouflaged battery began walking fire closer to the ship operating from a range of 15,000 yd (14,000 m). Rodman dropped smoke, and Emmons withdrew.

=== Extension of the bombardment ===
At 13:20, ten minutes before the agreed-to ending of the bombardment, Deyo, seeing that the mission was not accomplished, signaled VII Corps, "Do you wish more gunfire? Several enemy batteries still active." The Querqueville Battery had come to life again and taken Murphy under fire, straddling the destroyer four times in twenty minutes. Tuscaloosa came to her aid, scoring a direct hit bringing flames. With her deck covered with splinters and splashes from near misses, Murphy dodged behind a smoke screen. Ellyson and Gherardi joined in. Quincy fired for half an hour, then Nevada silenced the battery again. Later, as the task force withdrew, the battery opened fire again. More than its endurance, the task force upper decks noted its long day of near-misses. The battery near Gruchy came to life again. HMS Glasgow and Rodman returned fire. The batteries in and around Cherbourg seemed able to fire accurately at any ship within 15,000 yd (14,000 m) Rodman pulled out of range.

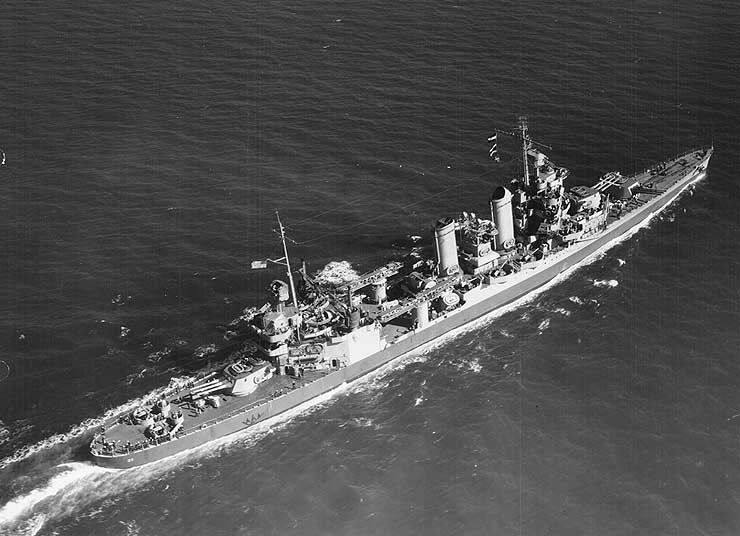
Heavy cruiser Tuscaloosa gave accurate on-call fires at 15 miles

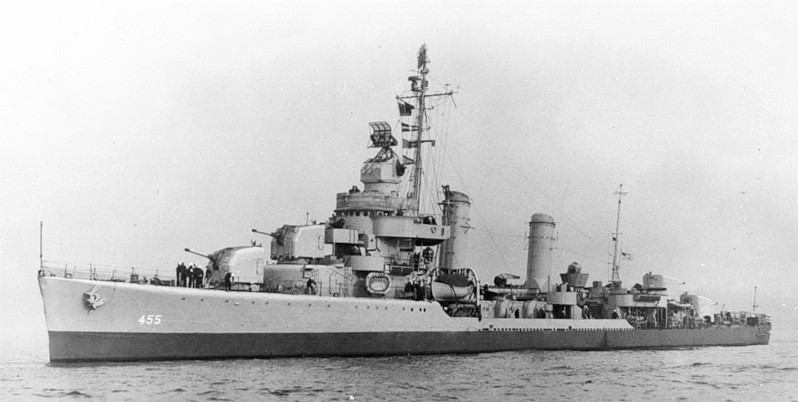
Destroyer Hambleton – small ships gave "most effective" infantry support

Navy men had been assigned to army units as shore party spotters to direct all fire more than 2,000 yd (1,800 m) inland. The infantry support fires could then safely reach along roads far inland, blowing German tanks into "scrap". Pillboxes were "powdered" and gun emplacements "tossed skyhigh". German shore batteries were in turn laying well placed fire, churning the seas with near misses bracketing Deyo's ships.

In Group 2, making westward to join Group 1, Texas was radically steering to dodge near-misses and straddles when one of the German 280 mm shells struck the hull and lodged alongside a sailor's bunk, but it, too, was a dud. At 13:35, one of the large caliber guns in Battery Hamburg was knocked out by Texas, and she and Arkansas continued through the afternoon firing at Battery Hamburg and another nearby battery. When they strayed back into the arc of fire, Battery Hamburg's three remaining guns made Texas a target, and a nearby 105 mm battery acquired Arkansas. Both ships maneuvered, the two remaining destroyers made smoke, and all escaped with no damage.

At 14:02 VII Corps replied to Deyo, "Thanks very much—we should be grateful if you would continue until 15:00." VII Corps was on the verge of breaking into Cherbourg's city streets. Fort des Flamand at the eastern end of the inner breakwater, had eight dual-purpose 88-mm guns holding up a regiment of the 4th Division. Shore fire control called for naval support, and Hambleton began firing, but large-caliber rounds from Battery Hamburg began to drop around her at 14,250 yd (13,030 m). She retired, then Quincy was able to silence the target fort. Nevada turned from Battery Hamburg and joined in the attack on targets on the west side of Cherbourg that might have turned landward on advancing infantry. For over twenty minutes she was repeatedly straddled, including two that holed her superstructure and another that missed as close as 25 ft (7.6 m).

An hour later, following Collins' new deadline of 15:00, Deyo ordered cease fire and began withdrawing from the bombardment area. Group 2 headed back to Portland, England, at 15:01. Flagship Tuscaloosa took another call for fire. The targets were 75 mm field guns in casemates, on the dock at the entrance to Cherbourg's naval arsenal. Tuscaloosa continued firing as she maneuvered out to sea, at 25,000 yd (23,000 m) and again out a further mile and a half with accuracy (25,414 m).

== Outcomes ==
On June 29, as the final German resistance in Cherbourg was overcome, Collins wrote to Deyo, stating that during the "naval bombardment of the coastal batteries and the covering strong points around Cherbourg ... results were excellent, and did much to engage the enemy's fire while our troops stormed into Cherbourg from the rear." After an inspection of the port defenses, an army liaison officer reported that the guns that had been targeted could not be reactivated, and those that could have been turned landward were still pointed out to sea when the city had fallen.

While reports taken from German prisoners speak of the terror they experienced from the bombardment, there is no evidence that naval gun fire caused great destruction to the German guns. As a result of the non-destruction of the guns, infantry had to be used to capture them. Nevertheless, the naval gunfire was effective in neutralizing the German batteries, disabling 22 of their 24 assigned targets, and during the bombardment there were long periods during which German gun positions fell silent. This was later attributed to the demoralizing effect that they had on the German gunners, rather than a destructive effect on the guns. The fire support provided by the task force's small ships proved to be more effective, and according to Allied reports after the bombardment this was the most effective aspect of the bombardment.

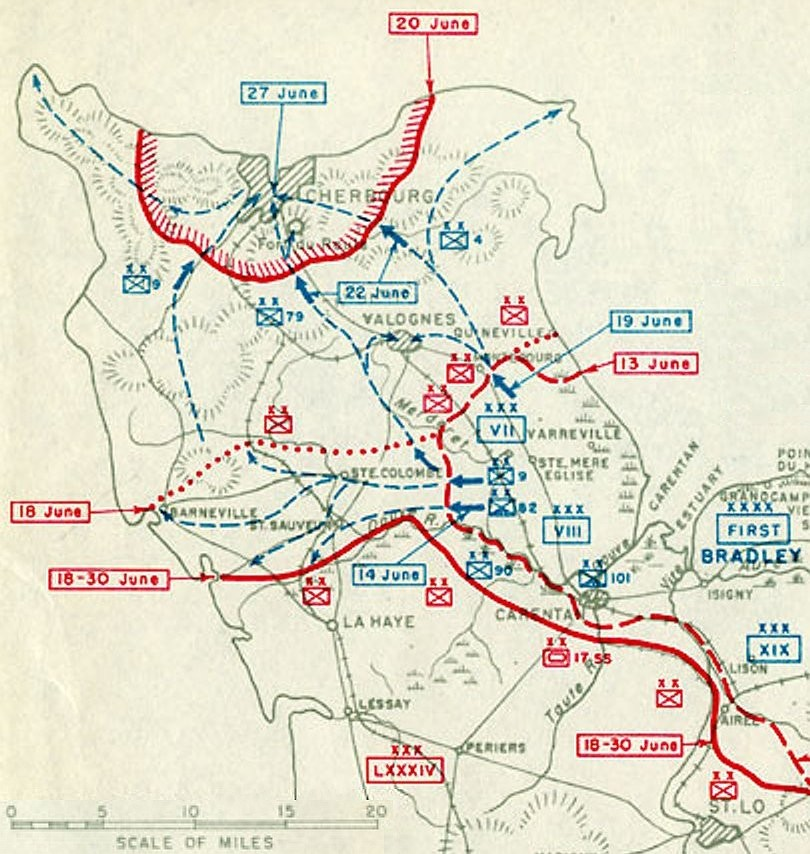
Closing VII Corps required air and ground control of naval fire support

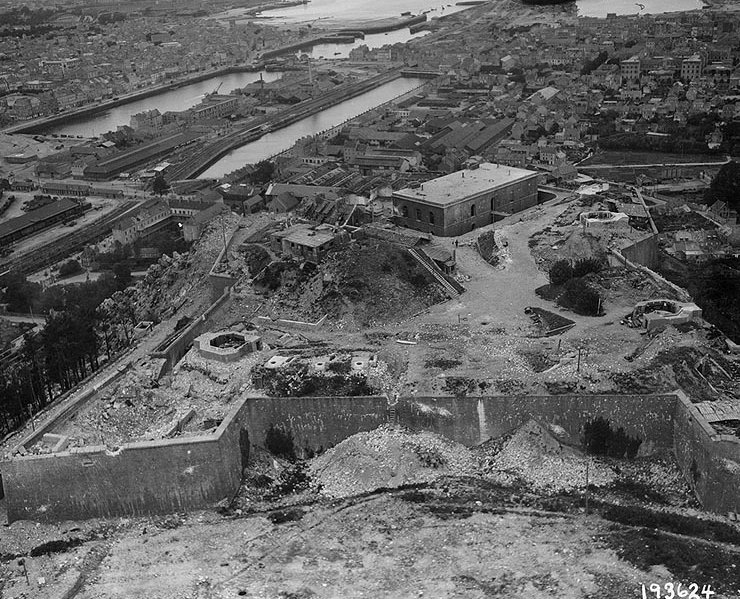
German fortifications were temporarily neutralized by heavy guns of battleships and cruisers

The volume of fire was notable and of consequence. The Allied Supreme Commander, General Dwight D. Eisenhower later wrote, "the final assault was materially assisted by heavy and accurate naval gunfire." Von Schlieben reported to Generalfeldmarschall Erwin Rommel that further resistance had been useless due in part to "heavy fire from the sea", while Admiral Theodor Krancke recorded for his war diary, that one of the contributing causes to Cherbourg's fall was a "naval bombardment of a hitherto unequalled fierceness." German reports of the effect of naval bombardment were broadcast over the German telegraph service in the German Military Journal. According to these reports, the Allied naval fire curtain was one of their trump cards and in a crisis, it was more accurate and it could be sustained on target, fulfilling the role of a floating artillery arm. The reports also discuss the role of the smaller Allied vessels, remarking that they had firepower that should not be underestimated: "a torpedo boat ... had the firepower of a howitzer battery, a destroyer that of a battery of artillery." The reports go on to compare a cruiser to a regiment of artillery and state that battleships with 38 to 40 cm guns had no equal in land warfare, and could only be matched "by an unusual concentration of very heavy batteries".

The German report said that Allied troops had a "particular advantage" from ship formations that provided the mobility to concentrate artillery on any point on the battlefield, and then change their placement to whatever the fighting required. The Anglo-American naval forces made "...the best possible use of this opportunity". A single coastal battery could come repeatedly under "...quite extraordinary superior fire-power". A multiple type formation of warships would concentrate fire at batteries when they were the focal point of combat, creating an "umbrella of fire (Feuerglocke)". Generalfeldmarschall Gerd von Rundstedt assessed Allied naval gun fire support as "flexible and well directed ...[in] ...support of the land troops ... ranging from battleship to gun boat ... as quickly mobile, constantly available artillery, at points ... as defense against our [German] attacks or as support for [Allied] attacks." He added that they were skillfully directed by air and ground spotters, and that the Allied naval gunnery had a high rapid-fire capacity at range.

German batteries were unsuccessful engaging ships of the task force, in that ships holed and bracketed with near misses were not sunk; the maneuvering ships were able to maintain positions in mineswept lanes for the most part, and countermeasures included use of smoke, jamming German radar and effective counter battery fires. Nevertheless, U.S. naval doctrine was modified after the operation. More attention was paid to the achievement of effective long range fire. According to Admiral Bertram Ramsay, Naval Commander in Chief of the Allied Naval Expeditionary Force, if the German gunners had not been hampered by faulty ammunition, "they might well have inflicted heavy damage to ...[the Allied] ...ships at the relatively close range ..." Prior to June 1944, the United States Navy's main experiences in the war had been in the Mediterranean and the Pacific. According to naval historian Samuel Morison, these experiences had resulted in an assumption that the modern fire control systems on U.S. ships allowed them to close with and defeat coastal batteries at will. But in the Mediterranean the shore batteries had not been "well and resolutely" served, and Japanese coastal defense gunners had been inadequately trained. As a result of the Cherbourg operation, Morison concluded that, even with modern directors for naval gunnery, a casemated gun is "exceedingly difficult for a rapidly maneuvering warship to destroy with a direct hit, although a shower of salvos around the coast defense position will silence the guns temporarily." Deyo's after-action report recommended that long-range bombardment with plane spotting would be required to silence casemated batteries, stating that either good air spot or shore parties are required for effective naval bombardment, especially when strong currents add to the navigational problems of a task force under accurate shore battery fire.

== Ships assigned ==
- Task Force 129, Group One (incomplete)
  - USS Tuscaloosa, New Orleans-class cruiser, Adm. Deyo flag, commanding, USS Quincy, Baltimore-class cruiser, USS Nevada, Nevada-class battleship
    HMS Glasgow, Southampton-class light cruiser, HMS Enterprise, Emerald-class light cruiser
  - USS Ellyson (desron flag), Gleaves-class destroyer, USS Rodman, USS Gherardi, USS Hambleton, USS Emmons
    HMS Sidmouth Group 1 lead minesweeper, HMS Bangor Bangor-class minesweeper
- Task Force 129, Group Two (incomplete)
  - USS Texas, New York-class battleship, Adm. Bryant flag, USS Arkansas, Wyoming-class battleship
  - USS Barton (desron flag), USS O'Brien, USS Laffey, Allen M. Sumner-class destroyer, USS Hobson (desdiv pennant), USS Plunkett
  - USS Swift, Auk-class minesweeper, USS Auk, USS Broadbill, USS Nuthatch, USS Pheasant
- Anti-submarine screen
  - HMS Onslow, O-class destroyer, HMS Offa, HMS Onslaught, HMS Oribi, Melbreak, Hunt-class destroyer, Type III, HMS Brissenden, Hunt-class destroyer Type IV

== See also ==
- Battle for Caen
- Battle of Cherbourg
- Normandy landings
- Operation Cobra
- Operation Overlord

== Bibliography ==
- Commander, U.S. Naval Forces in Europe (COMNAVEU) (2006) [1949]. The Invasion of Normandy: Operation NEPTUNE. Administrative History of U.S. Naval Forces in Europe, 1940–1946. Vol. V. Norfolk Va: Armed Forces Staff College. OCLC 31912945. Archived from the original on July 9, 2011.
- Morison, Samuel Eliot (2002) [1957]. "Cherbourg June–September 1944". The Invasion of France and Germany. History of United States Naval Operations in World War II. Vol. XI. Champaign, Illinois: University of Illinois Press. ISBN 0252070623.
- Rankin, Nicholas (2011). Ian Fleming's Commandos: The Story of 30 Assault Unit in WWII. London: Faber and Faber. ISBN 978-0-57125-062-2.
- Rosco, Theodore (1953). United States Destroyer Operations in World War II. Annapolis: Naval Institute Press. ISBN 0-87021-726-7.
- Roskill, Stephen W. (1961). The War at Sea 1939–1945: The Offensive. Part II 1st June 1944 – 14th August 1945. History of the Second World War. Vol. III. London: HMSO. OCLC 236145.
- Schofield, B.B. (2008). Operation Neptune: The Inside Story of Naval Operations for the Normandy Landings 1944. Barnsley: Pen & Sword Military. ISBN 978-1-84415-662-7.
