= USS Tide (AM-125) =

Minesweeper of the United States Navy

Coordinates: 49°36′59″N 1°4′59″W

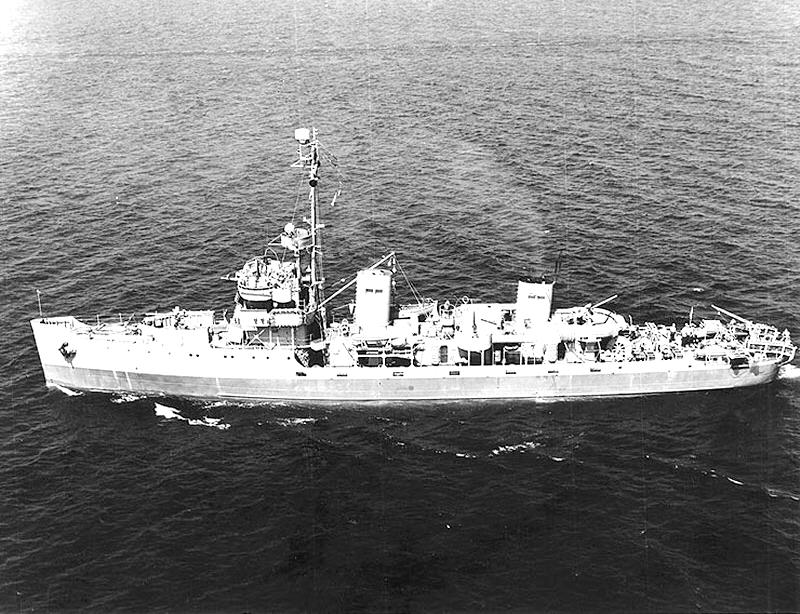
- Tide (AM-125) at sea, 15 June 1943

History

United States
- Name: USS Tide
- Builder: Savannah Machinery and Foundry Company, Savannah, Georgia
- Laid down: 16 March 1942
- Launched: 7 September 1942
- Commissioned: 9 May 1943
- Stricken: 29 July 1944
- Honors and awards: 1 battle star (World War II)
- Fate: Sunk in action, 7 June 1944

General characteristics
- Class & type: Auk-class minesweeper
- Displacement: 890 long tons (904 t)
- Length: 221 ft 3 in (67.44 m)
- Beam: 32 ft (9.8 m)
- Draft: 10 ft 9 in (3.28 m)
- Speed: 18 kn (33 km/h; 21 mph)
- Complement: 105 officers and enlisted
- Armament: 2 × 3 in (76 mm)/50 cal guns, 4 × 20 mm cannons, 2 × depth charge tracks, 4 × depth charge projectors, 1 × Hedgehog anti-submarine mortar

USS Tide (AM-125) was an oceangoing Auk class minesweeper built for the United States Navy during World War II. Named for the marine tide, she was the only U.S. Naval vessel to bear the name.

Tide was laid down on 16 March 1942 at Savannah, Georgia, by the Savannah Machinery and Foundry Company; launched on 7 September 1942; sponsored by Mrs. Ruth Hangs; and commissioned on 9 May 1943.

Tide served in the European Theatre of Operations and was assigned to minesweeping the beaches offshore the Normandy landing in June of 1944. On the day following D-Day, June 7, 1944, she struck a German mine and sank. She received one battle star for her wartime service.

== North African operations ==
Following shakedown training out of Key West and Norfolk, Tide got underway from Hampton Roads for her first transatlantic voyage. On 17 July 1943, as she steamed in convoy for North Africa, the minesweeper collided with an infantry landing craft — LCI-267 — which she had just provisioned. Damage to the sweeper included sprung plates and two minor hull punctures which were repaired at sea. Tide arrived at Casablanca on 18 July and was soon on her way again escorting a convoy bound for American ports. During the homeward voyage on 29 July, a sonar contact prompted Tide to drop depth charges on what she thought was an enemy submarine. Although a later search revealed an oil slick, no submarine sinking was confirmed.

== Stateside operations ==
Following her arrival at New York on 9 August 1943, Tide operated on the Eastern Sea Frontier until 30 September. In October–November, she made another Atlantic crossing, returning to New York on 25 November. In December, Tide participated in exercises off the coast of Maine and conducted mine warfare training off Yorktown, Virginia. Convoy duties in the waters of the Eastern Sea Frontier and the Caribbean occupied her in January 1944. On the 25th, Tide got underway again for what was to be her longest convoy escort assignment. Departing Charleston, she steamed — via Bermuda and the Azores — for the United Kingdom.

== European operations ==
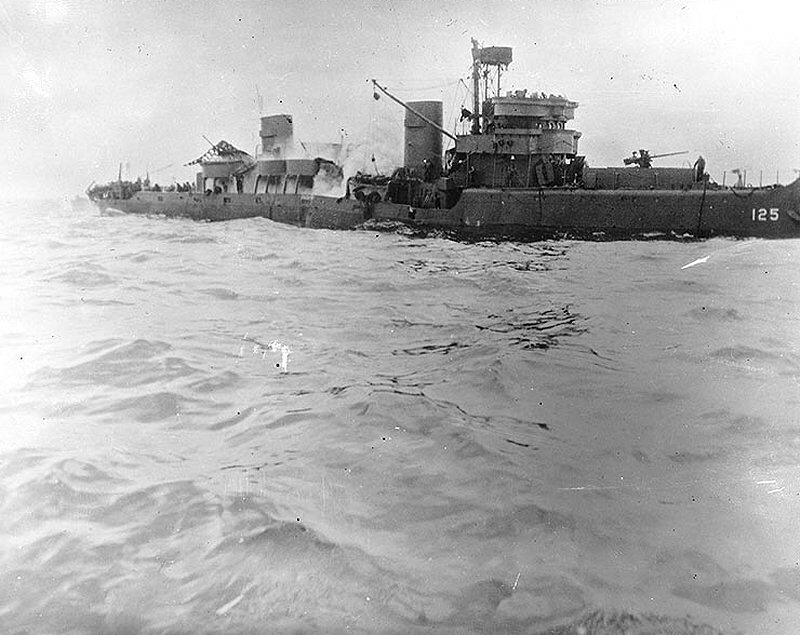
Minesweeper USS Tide (AM-125) after striking a mine off Utah Beach, 7 June 1944. Note her broken back, with smoke pouring from amidships.

Tide completed this voyage at Milford Haven, Wales on 10 March 1944 and spent the remainder of the month operating out of Falmouth. In April–May, she escorted convoys in British coastal waters and engaged in exercises with minesweepers of the Royal Navy in preparation for the invasion of Europe. In the last week of May, Tide made sweeps out of Babbacombe Bay. On 5 June, Tide got underway from Tor Bay with Minesweeper Squadron "A", a unit assigned to the Utah Beach area. Later that day, German mines began to take their toll as Osprey, a squadron member, went down. As the day wore on, Tide swept channels off the Normandy beaches for fire-support ships and continued sweeps the next day, "D-Day". During the night of 6–7 June, she joined other vessels in guarding the Carentan Estuary to prevent the sally of enemy E-boats.

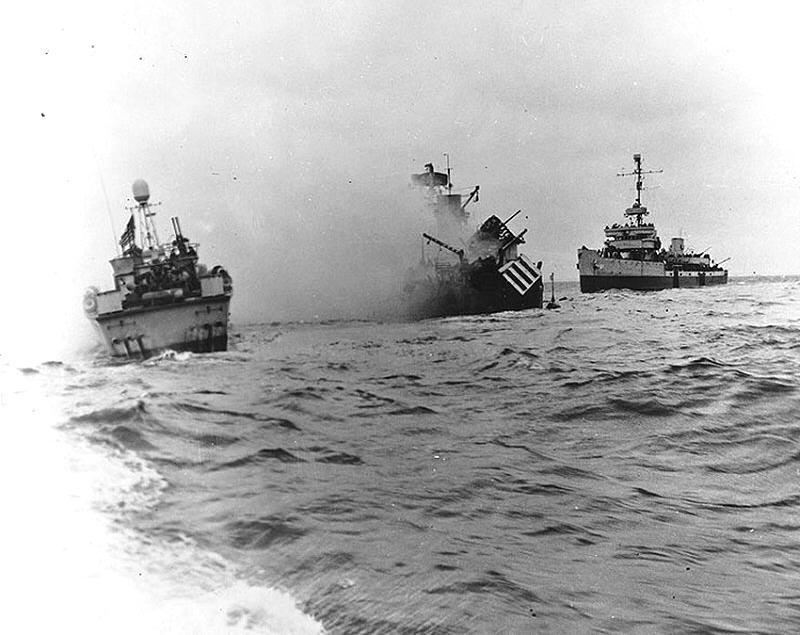
USS Tide sinking off "Utah" Beach after striking a mine during the Normandy invasion, 7 June 1944. PT-509 and Pheasant are standing by. Photographed from Threat.

On the morning of 7 June, Tide swept the area inshore and between Îles Saint-Marcouf and Barfleur to clear lanes for fire-support ships. At 09:40, while recovering her gear, Tide drifted over the Cardonet Banks and struck a mine which exploded with such force that she was lifted out of the water. The explosion broke her back, blasted a tremendous hole in her bottom, and tore away all bulkheads below the waterline causing immediate and irreversible flooding. Tide's commanding officer — Lt. Cdr. Allard B. Heyward — died soon after the initial explosion, and Lt. Cdr. George Crane — the ship's executive officer — directed efforts to assist the stricken vessel and to rescue survivors. Threat and Pheasant tried to aid Tide, but the ship was beyond saving. When Swift attempted to tow the damaged ship to the beach, the strain broke Tide in two. She sank only minutes after the last survivors had been taken off. Her name was struck from the Naval Vessel Register on 29 July.

== Awards ==
Tide received one battle star for World War II service.

== See also ==
- List of United States Navy losses in World War II
