= USS Swift (AM-122) =

Minesweeper of the United States Navy

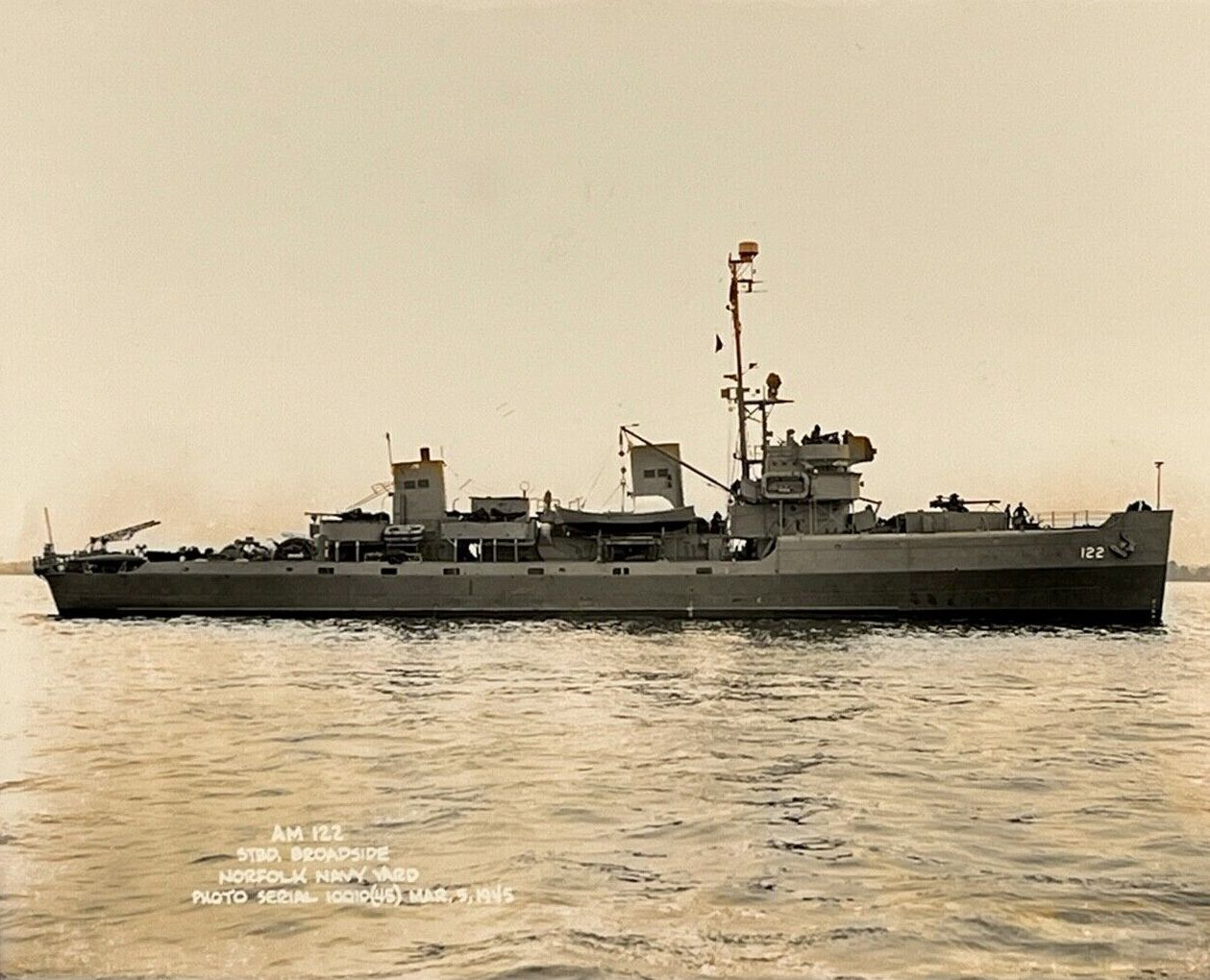
- Swift underway off Norfolk Navy Yard, 5 March 1945

History

United States
- Name: USS Swift
- Builder: John H. Mathis & Company, Camden, New Jersey
- Laid down: 27 June 1942
- Launched: 5 December 1942
- Commissioned: 29 December 1943
- Decommissioned: 4 June 1946
- Recommissioned: 19 December 1951
- Decommissioned: 13 December 1955
- Reclassified: MSF-122, 7 February 1955
- Stricken: 1 July 1972
- Honours and awards: 6 battle stars (World War II); 2 battle stars (Korea)
- Fate: Scrapped

General characteristics
- Class & type: Auk-class minesweeper
- Displacement: 890 long tons (904 t)
- Length: 221 ft 3 in (67.44 m)
- Beam: 32 ft (9.8 m)
- Draft: 10 ft 9 in (3.28 m)
- Speed: 18 knots (33 km/h; 21 mph)
- Complement: 100 officers and enlisted
- Armament: 1 × 3"/50 caliber gun; 2 × 40 mm guns; 2 × 20 mm guns; 2 × Depth charge tracks

USS Swift (AM-122) was an Auk-class minesweeper acquired by the United States Navy for the dangerous task of removing mines from minefields laid in the water to prevent ships from passing.

The second U.S. Naval vessel to be so named, Swift was laid down on 27 June 1942 by John H. Mathis & Company, Camden, New Jersey. The ship launched on 5 December 1942, sponsored by Mrs. J. E. Sheedy, and commissioned on 29 December 1943. Swift held her shakedown cruise at Little Creek, Virginia, and on 11 February 1944 entered the Norfolk, Virginia Navy Yard for alterations.

== Atlantic Ocean operations ==
Upon completion, Swift sailed to New York City to await the formation of a convoy. The convoy was formed and sailed, with Swift as escort, on 25 March for England. It arrived at Falmouth, England on 19 April, and Swift proceeded to Plymouth, England, where she reported to Naval Forces, Europe, for duty. She operated out of Plymouth and Torquay, England, until the end of May.

As a unit of Mine Division (MinDiv) 18, Swift sailed from Torquay, on 5 June for Normandy, France, where she began sweeping mines off the Utah Beachhead. She swept mines from dawn to dusk and acted as "E-boat" patrol at night. On D + l (7 June) Tide (AM-125) was mined and sunk while being towed by Swift. Swift remained there until 17 June when she returned to Plymouth, England. Seven days later, she returned to France to aid in sweeping a lane for battleships so they could bombard Cherbourg and returned to England.

Swift was next routed to Algeria and sailed from Plymouth on 1 August. She arrived at Oran on 6 August and was assigned to the invasion fleet for the assault on southern France, "Operation Dragoon". Swift sortied with the fleet on 10 August and was off the landing beaches in the early morning of D-Day, 15 August. She helped clear the transport area and swept lanes for landing craft. After the troops were ashore, the minesweeper remained on station, sweeping by day and performing antisubmarine and "E-boat" patrol by night. Swift escorted a convoy to Naples, Italy, on 16 October and returned to Golfe de Juan, France. She made daily sweeps up the French Riviera, past the German frontier, to the vicinity of San Remo. The minesweeper returned to Oran on 21 December and joined a convoy bound for the United States which sailed on 28 December 1944.

Swift arrived at Norfolk, Virginia, in mid-January 1945 and entered the navy yard there for an overhaul in preparation for duty in the Pacific. The work was completed on 5 March and, after refresher training, she departed for Miami, Florida, with Sway (AM-120) and Symbol (AM-123). The minesweepers arrived there on 30 March and air-search radar was installed on Swift.

== Pacific Ocean operations ==
The ships departed on 26 April 1945 for the Panama Canal Zone and the U.S. West Coast, arriving at San Diego, California, on 15 May. Swift sailed two days later with Symbol and Threat (AM-124) for Hawaii. She arrived at Pearl Harbor on the 26th and sailed to Guam six days later. Upon her arrival at Apra Harbor, she was routed onward to Ulithi. Swift stood out of Ulithi on 30 June as an escort for convoy UOK-32 en route to Okinawa and arrived at Kerama Retto on 6 July. She swept mines in the East China Sea from 10 to 15 July and from 13 to 25 August.

Swift sailed from Okinawa on 31 August for Tsugaru Strait, between Honshū and Hokkaidō, Japan, and swept mines there from 7 to 17 September. After an upkeep period at Ominato Bay, Honshū, from the 18th to the 22nd, she swept westward of the strait from 23 September to 13 October. The ship operated out of Ominato until she began clearing the "Klondike" area of the East China Sea from 26 October to 8 November. Swift was overhauled at Sasebo and then, on 26 November, sailed to Kiirin, Formosa, to sweep mines off the northwest coast. On 11 December, she moved to the Pescadore Islands and swept Formosa Strait for 10 days. The minesweeper sailed for Shanghai, China, on 21 December 1945 and arrived there the next day. Swift remained there until early January 1946 when she departed for the west coast of the United States, via Pearl Harbor. She arrived at San Diego, California, in February and was assigned to the Pacific Reserve Fleet, in commission, in reserve. Swift was placed out of commission, in reserve, on 4 June 1946.

== Second commissioning ==
On 17 April 1951, it was decided to activate Swift; and she was placed in commission again on 19 December 1951. After overhaul and refresher training, the minesweeper was assigned to Mine Squadron 5 for duty and operated along the California coast until October 1952.

Swift made a voyage to Hawaii from 28 October to 1 December 1952. On 3 February 1953 she stood out of Long Beach, California, en route to the Far East and the Korean war zone. She called at Pearl Harbor in mid-February and arrived at Sasebo, Japan, on 9 March. The ship sailed for Korea and operated in the East Coast Operating Zone and at Hungnam until 28 April. She was in Korea again from 24 May until 25 August, operating between Wonsan, Pusan, and Cheju Do. Swift sailed from Sasebo on 4 September en route to California, via Pearl Harbor.

Swift arrived at Long Beach, California, on 27 September 1953 and conducted local operations along the California coast until October 1954. She deployed to the Far East again from 21 October 1954 to the spring of 1955 when she returned to local operations at San Diego, California. Swift was reclassified from AM-122 to MSF-122, Minesweeper, Fleet (steel hulled) on 7 February 1955.

== Decommissioning ==
She was decommissioned again on 13 December 1955 and assigned to the Pacific Reserve Fleet. Swift was struck from the Navy list on 1 July 1972 and scrapped.

== Awards ==
Swift received six battle stars for service in World War II and two for service in Korea.
