= USS Sway =

Minesweeper of the United States Navy

History

United States
- Name: USS Sway(AM-120)
- Builder: John H. Mathis & Company, Camden, New Jersey
- Laid down: 18 November 1941
- Launched: 29 September 1942
- Commissioned: 20 July 1943
- Decommissioned: 15 January 1947
- Reclassified: MSF-120, 7 February 1955
- Stricken: 1 July 1972
- Honours and awards: 5 battle stars (World War II)
- Fate: Sold to Mexico, 16 February 1973

History

Mexico
- Name: ARM Ignacio Altamirano (C80)
- Namesake: Ignacio Altamirano
- Acquired: 16 February 1973
- Reclassified: G12
- Reclassified: P111, 1993
- Decommissioned: retired from service by 2004
- Fate: unknown

General characteristics
- Class & type: Auk-class minesweeper
- Displacement: 689 long tons (700 t)
- Length: 221 ft 6 in (67.51 m)
- Beam: 32 ft (9.8 m)
- Draft: 9 ft 4 in (2.84 m)
- Speed: 18 knots (33 km/h; 21 mph)
- Complement: 105 officers and enlisted (95 men, 10 officers)
- Armament: 1 × 3"/50 caliber gun; 2 × 40 mm guns
- Notes: cost: 6.5 million

USS Sway (AM-120) was an Auk-class minesweeper acquired by the United States Navy for the dangerous task of removing mines from minefields laid in the water to prevent ships from passing.

Sway was laid down on 18 November 1941 by John H. Mathis & Company, Camden, New Jersey; launched on 29 September 1942; sponsored by Mrs. W. W. Robinson; and commissioned on 20 July 1943.

== World War II North Africa operations ==
Sway conducted her shakedown and training along the New England coast. She then operated from Norfolk to New York until mid-October. The minesweeper stood out of Norfolk on 15 October as an escort for convoy UGS-21 en route to Algeria. Sway arrived at Oran on 1 November. Two weeks later, she and Sustain (AM-119) escorted a convoy to Naples, Italy. The remainder of November and all of December was spent escorting convoys between Naples, Bizerte, and Palermo. In Naples, in mid-January 1944, Sway and Mine Squadron (MinRon) 6 were attached to an assault force that was to participate in "Operation Shingle" – the landing of combined American and British forces 60 miles behind the German lines in the Anzio-Nettuno area.

== Italian Campaign Support operations ==
The ships sortied on 21 January, and Sway arrived in the assault area the next morning. She streamed her sweep gear and began clearing the beaches for the landing. On one notable occasion the ship opened fire on PT-201 which was carrying General Clark in inspect the landings. The ship remained there on E-boat and anti-submarine patrol until the 31st when she escorted a convoy to Naples. She escorted another convoy back to Anzio and remained there from 3 to 18 February when she returned to Naples. From that date to 1 August, she shuttled between Anzio, other Italian ports, and North Africa.

== Operation Dragoon participation ==
Sway stood out of Naples on 12 August with a convoy to participate in "Operation Dragoon", the invasion of southern France. She arrived in the assault area of the Gulf of Tropez in the early morning of 15 August and began sweeping the area. She operated there until 2 September when she moved to the Marseille-Toulon area. Sway departed the operating area on 6 October en route to Bizerte, via Corsica. For the next two months the minesweeper shuttled between French, Italian, and North African ports. On 28 December 1944, Sway steamed out of Oran with a convoy bound for the United States.

== Stateside overhaul ==
Sway arrived at Norfolk, Virginia on 19 January 1945 and remained there until late March being overhauled for duty in the Pacific. She and Swift (AM-122) sailed for Miami, Florida, on 27 March. Upon arrival there on the 30th, air search radar was installed. She rendezvoused with the other ships of Mine Division 18 at Key West, Florida on the 24th, and they sailed for the west coast three days later.

== Pacific operations ==
The ships arrived at San Diego, on 15 May. Sway sailed independently for Hawaii on 22 May and arrived at Pearl Harbor eight days later. She departed from Guam, M.I., on 11 June and, upon arrival, made last minute preparations for combat. On the last day of the month she joined a convoy as escort and sailed for Okinawa, arriving at Buckner Bay on 12 July. From 22 to 30 July, Sway swept the "Juneau" area of the East China Sea. In August, she swept the "Skagway" area from the 13th to the 24th. On 31 August, she departed Okinawa for Tsugaru Strait, between Honshū and Hokkaidō, and swept there from 7 to 31 September. She then swept the Ominato Ko area until 19 October when she got underway for Sasebo, Japan. She arrived there on 24 October and two days later began a sweep of the "Klondike" area of the East China Sea which lasted until 7 November. Sway operated in the Pescadores Islands and the Formosa area from 28 November to 15 December. "Sway" arrived at Amoy, China on 18 December and departed 19 December. It arrived at Kiiron, Formoasa on 20 December. On the 21st, she got underway from Kiiron, Formoasa, for China, and arrived at Shanghai on 23 December 1945.

Sway remained in China until 3 January 1946. She headed for Sasebo, Japan and arrived 5 January. She departed 15 January and got underway for the United States, via Eniwetok(arrived 23 January, departed 24 January) and Hawaii(arrived 31 January, departed 2 February). She called at Pearl Harbor and departed there on 2 February for San Diego(arrived 9 February).

== Deactivation ==
When Sway arrived at San Diego, it was decided to inactivate her. On 22 February, she was placed in reserve, in commission. On 15 January 1947, she was placed in reserve, out of commission, with the Pacific Reserve Fleet. Sway was reclassified from AM-120 to MSF-120, Minesweeper, Fleet (steel-hulled), on 7 February 1955.

Sway was struck from the Navy list on 1 July 1972. The ship was sold to Mexico on 16 February 1973.

== Awards ==
Sway received five battle stars for World War II.

== Mexican Navy service ==
The former Sway was purchased by the Mexican Navy on 16 February 1973 and renamed ARM Ignacio Altamirano (C80). Her pennant number was later changed to G12, and, in 1993, to P111. Ignacio Altamirano had been retired from service by 2004. The vessel reportedly seen in Guaymas in January 2009 afloat, but not in service and not maintained.
