= USS Glennon (DD-620) =

Gleaves-class destroyer

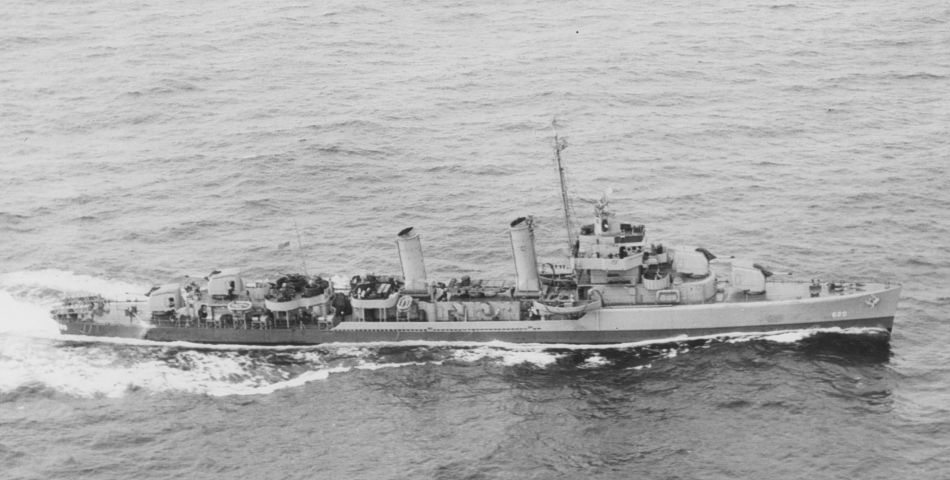
- USS Glennon (DD-620) underway circa in 1943.

History

United States
- Name: Glennon
- Namesake: James H. Glennon
- Builder: Federal Shipbuilding and Drydock Company
- Laid down: 25 March 1942
- Launched: 26 August 1942
- Commissioned: 8 October 1942
- Fate: 8 June 1944, struck mine off Normandy; 10 June 1944, sunk by shore batteries

General characteristics
- Class & type: Gleaves-class destroyer
- Displacement: 1,630 tons
- Length: 348 ft 3 in (106.15 m)
- Beam: 36 ft 1 in (11.00 m)
- Draft: 11 ft 10 in (3.61 m)
- Propulsion: 50,000 shp (37,000 kW); 4 boilers; 2 propellers
- Speed: 37.4 knots (69 km/h)
- Range: 6,500 nmi (12,000 km; 7,500 mi) at 12 kn (22 km/h; 14 mph)
- Complement: 16 officers, 260 enlisted
- Armament: 4 × 5 in (127 mm) DP guns, 6 × 0.50 in (12.7 mm) guns, 6 × 20 mm (0.79 in) AA guns, 10 × 21 in (533 mm) torpedo tubes, 2 × depth charge tracks

USS Glennon (DD-620) was a Gleaves-class destroyer, the first ship of the United States Navy to be named for Rear Admiral James H. Glennon, who was a recipient of the Navy Cross.

== Service history ==
Glennon was launched on 26 August 1942 by the Federal Shipbuilding & Dry Dock Company, of Kearny, New Jersey, sponsored by Miss Jeanne Lejeune Glennon (whose later surname was Hull), granddaughter of Admiral Glennon, and commissioned on 8 October 1942.

=== Convoy duty and operations in the Mediterranean ===
After shakedown training along the New England coast, Glennon guarded troops and supply convoys for the Allied invasion of Sicily, Italy. She was in action during the Amphibious Battle of Gela, fought from 9 to 15 July 1943.

Glennon continued to operate in the Mediterranean Sea and returned to New York on 3 December 1943. The destroyer then made two round-trip convoy escort voyages to the British Isles and one to Gibraltar. She arrived in New York from Gibraltar on 22 April 1944, and stood out of that port on 5 May with a task group which arrived at Belfast, Northern Ireland, on the 14th.

=== Invasion of Normandy and sinking ===
Assigned to Assault Force "U" of the Western Naval Task Force, she arrived in the Baie de la Seine, France, on 6 June. After patrolling around the bombardment group for submarines and fast German torpedo boats, she joined in gunfire support of troops ashore.

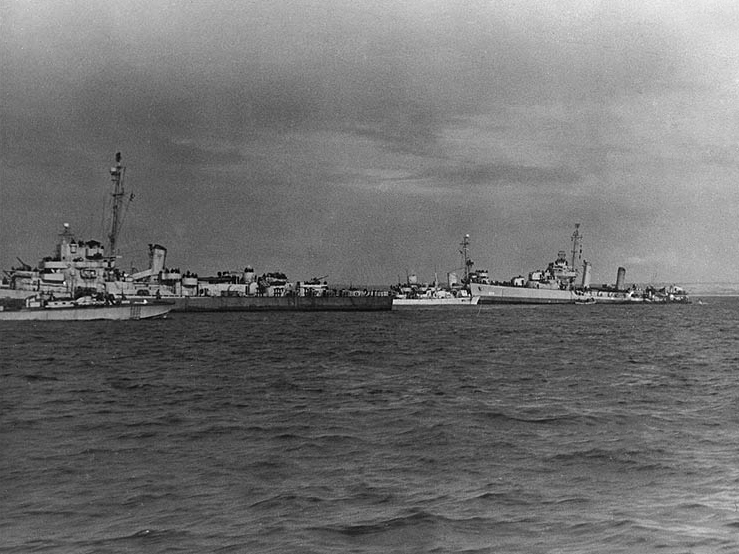
Glennon after hitting a mine on 8 June 1944.

On 7 June, she fired 430 5-inch (127 mm) shells ashore in support of troops advancing north toward Quinéville. She was again approaching her gunfire support station at 08:30 on 8 June, when her stern struck a mine. A whaleboat picked up survivors while minesweepers Staff and Threat arrived on the scene, one passing a towline while the other swept ahead of the damaged destroyer. The destroyer escort Rich closed in the wake of the minesweepers to assist, then felt a heavy explosion as she slowly rounded Glennon's stern to clear the area. Minutes later a second explosion blew off a 50-foot (15 m) section of Rich's stern, followed by a third mine explosion under her forecastle. Rich sank within 15 minutes of the first explosion.

The minesweeper Staff found she could not budge Glennon, whose stern seemed to be firmly anchored to the bottom by her starboard propeller. Most of her crew boarded Staff, and those remaining on Glennon lightened her stern by pumping fuel forward and jettisoning depth charges and topside gear. On 9 June, salvage equipment was assembled, and some 60 officers and men of Glennon came back on board. The following morning a German shore battery near Quinéville found the ships range. A second salvo hit Glennon amidships and cut off all power. After a third hit, the crew was ordered to abandon ship and the men were taken off in a landing craft. Glennon floated until 21:45, 10 June 1944, then rolled over and sank (location: 49°31′15″N 001°09′16″W). She suffered 25 lost and 38 wounded.

Glennon was awarded two battle stars for services in World War II.
