= James H. Glennon =

United States Navy admiral

James Henry Glennon
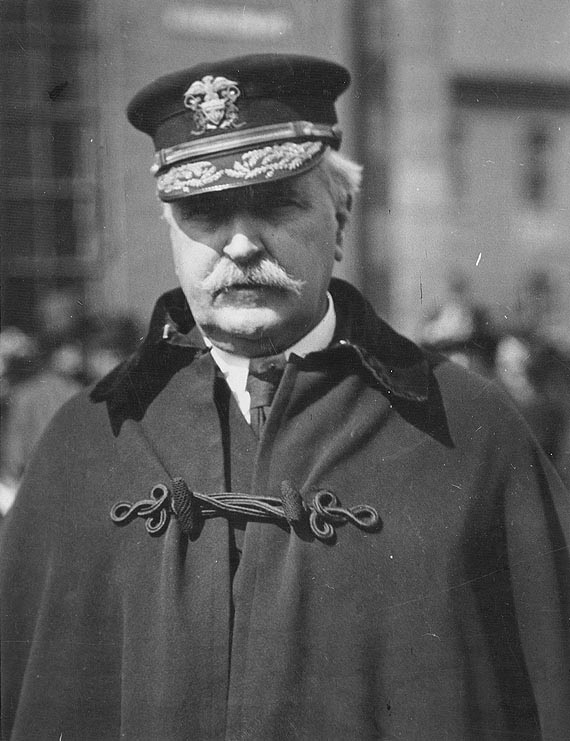
- Rear Admiral James H. Glennon, c. 1919
- Born: February 11, 1857; French Gulch, California, US
- Died: May 29, 1940 (aged 83); Washington, D.C., US
- Burial place: Arlington National Cemetery
- Military career
- Allegiance: United States
- Branch: United States Navy
- Service years: 1874–1921
- Rank: Rear Admiral
- Conflicts: Spanish–American War; Philippine–American War; World War I
- Awards: Navy Cross

James Henry Glennon (11 February 1857 – 29 May 1940) was a United States Navy officer. He saw action in the Spanish–American War, the Philippine–American War, and World War I.

== Early life and career, to World War I ==
Born in French Gulch, California, he was appointed a cadet midshipman on 24 September 1874. He served as a midshipman in Lackawanna, Alaska and Pensacola, and later as an officer in Ranger (1881–85) and Constellation (1885–88).

He commanded a forward gun turret in the battleship Massachusetts when she and Texas sank the Reina Mercedes on 4 July 1898.

While executive officer and navigator in the gunboat Vicksburg, he participated in the actions against the Philippine insurgents.

During 1912 to 1913 he was President of the Board of Naval Ordnance and of the Joint Army-Navy Board on smokeless powder.

== World War I and postwar period ==
He served as Commandant of the Washington Navy Yard and Superintendent of the Naval Gun Factory from 1915 to early 1917 when he was appointed the Navy Department representative in a special mission under Elihu Root being sent to Russia. At the risk of his life, Glennon persuaded mutinous Russian sailors who had taken over Russian ships-of-war in the waters of Sevastopol, to restore command to their officers. After completing the mission to Russia, he took command of Battleship Division 5 with his flag in the battleship Connecticut.

He was awarded the Navy Cross for meritorious service in this command, including the instruction of midshipmen and thousands of recruits for duty as armed guard crews of merchant ships. Detached from this duty on 17 September 1918, he became Commandant of the 13th Naval District until 3 January 1919, then was Commandant of the 3rd Naval District at New York. Having reached the statutory age for retirement, he was transferred to the Retired List on 1 February 1921.

Rear Admiral James Henry Glennon died at Washington, D.C., 29 May 1940, and was buried at Arlington National Cemetery.

== Namesakes ==
USS Glennon (DD-620), a Gleaves-class destroyer, and USS Glennon (DD-840), a Gearing-class destroyer, were named after Admiral Glennon.
