= USS Glennon (DD-840) =

Gearing-class destroyer, sunk as a target

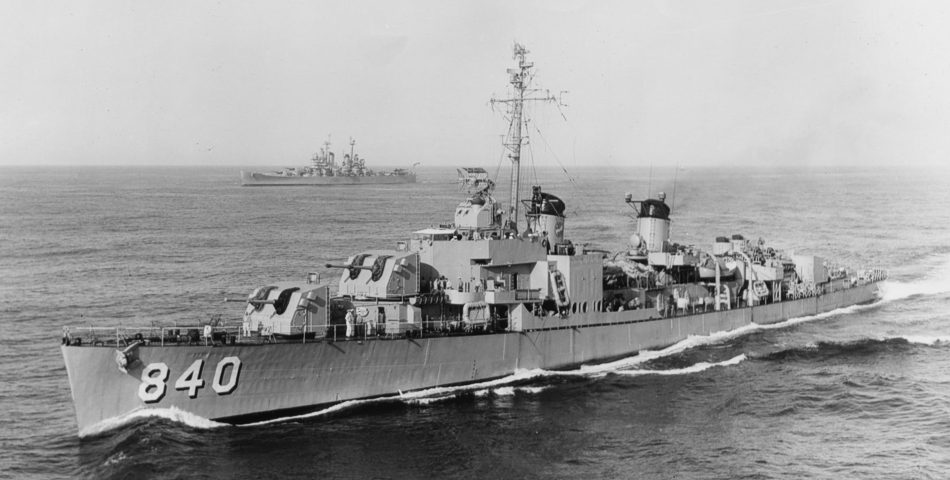
- USS Glennon underway in 1948

History
- Name: USS Glennon
- Namesake: James H. Glennon
- Builder: Bath Iron Works, Bath, Maine
- Laid down: 12 March 1945
- Launched: 14 July 1945
- Commissioned: 4 October 1945
- Decommissioned: 1 October 1976
- Stricken: 1 October 1976
- Identification: Callsign: NGLN; Hull number: DD-840
- Fate: Sunk as a target, 26 February 1981

General characteristics
- Class & type: Gearing-class destroyer
- Displacement: 3,460 long tons (3,516 t) full
- Length: 390 ft 6 in (119.02 m)
- Beam: 40 ft 10 in (12.45 m)
- Draft: 14 ft 4 in (4.37 m)
- Propulsion: Geared turbines, 2 shafts, 60,000 shp (45 MW)
- Speed: 35 knots (65 km/h; 40 mph)
- Range: 4,500 nmi (8,300 km) at 20 kn (37 km/h; 23 mph)
- Complement: 336
- Armament: 6 × 5"/38 caliber guns; 12 × 40 mm AA guns; 11 × 20 mm AA guns; 10 × 21 inch (533 mm) torpedo tubes; 6 × depth charge projectors; 2 × depth charge tracks

USS Glennon (DD-840) was a Gearing-class destroyer of the United States Navy, the second Navy ship named for Rear Admiral James H. Glennon (1857–1940).

Glennon was launched on 14 July 1945 by the Bath Iron Works, Bath, Maine; sponsored by Miss Frances Reading Glennon, granddaughter; and commissioned on 4 October 1945.

== Service history ==
=== 1945–1951 ===
After shakedown off Cuba, Glennon sailed from Boston, Massachusetts on 12 February 1946 for Europe and visited many of the nations washed by the North Sea before returning to New York in August of the same year. Undergoing upkeep at Boston and overhaul at Newport, Rhode Island, Glennon conducted refresher training out of Guantanamo Bay during April and May 1947. For the next 12 months she engaged in a rigorous schedule of tactics along the New England coast and down the eastern seaboard to ports of Florida. In February and March 1948 she took part in combat fleet exercises and maneuvers in waters ranging from Cuba to Trinidad and the Panama Canal.

Sailing from Norfolk, Virginia in June 1948, Glennon served with the Midshipman Practice Squadron and made calls at Portugal, Italy, and French Morocco. She joined the 6th Fleet in August 1948 for Mediterranean duty, returning stateside in January 1949 for overhaul at Boston. In the winter of 1949–50 she was part of "Operation Frostbite", a cold weather exercise near the Davis Strait, subsequently to sail from Newport on 4 January 1950 for another "Med" cruise.

Upon return to the United States, she made a series of reserve training cruises along the eastern, seaboard and engaged in type training along the New England coast and into the Caribbean Sea. Underway from Newport on 8 January 1951, she embarked on another "Med" cruise, returning to Boston in May for overhaul followed by refresher training out of Cuba.

=== 1952–1967 ===
Glennon spent January and February 1952 with a carrier task force conducting cold weather training in waters ranging northward to the Davis Straits. From April to October she was flagship of Destroyer Squadron 8 (DesRon 8), and stood out in June for the Mediterranean, returning to Annapolis, Maryland in September 1952. In July and August 1952 'Glennon' was part of a Task Group with the flagship New Jersey which conducted Midshipman training on a six-week cruise. The Task Group shipped out of Newport News, VA with ports of call at Cherbourg, Lisbon, and Guantanamo. For more than a decade the destroyer continued her already established peacetime operation pattern. Highlights of this exacting duty included participation as a recovery station ship in the 1961 and 1962 Project Mercury flights, and in the search for the lost nuclear powered submarine Thresher (SSN-593). In August 1961 Glennon was called away suddenly to join the task force for the Project Mercury space shot carrying Major Gus Grissom. In early 1962 she was again chosen to man an Atlantic recovery station for the historic three-orbit flight of Major John Glenn.

An extensive overhaul at Boston terminated on 24 July 1963, and through the remainder of that year Glennon trained in the Caribbean, acted as school ship for the Anti-submarine Warfare School at Key West, Florida, and put in at Boston in November for refitting. The years 1964 and 1965 found Glennon continuing her ASW work. In September 1964 she was chosen to carry guests to the America's Cup Races. Later in May 1965 she conducted exercises called "Mule 65" in which United States Army cadets from West Point were given shipboard indoctrination. Through 1967 Glennon continued to operate with the United States Atlantic Fleet.

=== 1967–1976 ===
Glennon was called to serve with TF77 as a Naval Gunfire Support Unit off Viet Nam in 1972. She made a 72-hour notice emergency deployment from Charleston South Carolina through the Panama Canal. She supported many operations and answered many calls for fire in South Viet Nam and around the DMZ. She also supported operations off North Viet Nam, and was involved in several fire fights with shore batteries. Her Officers and crew wear the Combat Action Ribbon, multiple awards. Glennon was decommissioned and struck from the Naval Vessel Register on 1 October 1976. She was sunk as a target off Puerto Rico on 26 February 1981.
