= HMS Bangor (J00) =

Minesweeper of the Royal Navy

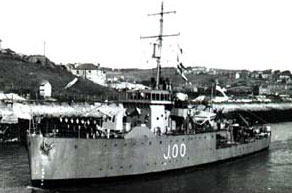
- HMS Bangor underway

History

United Kingdom
- Name: HMS Bangor
- Ordered: 12 July 1939
- Builder: Harland & Wolff, Govan, Scotland
- Yard number: 1039
- Laid down: 19 September 1939
- Launched: 23 May 1940
- Completed: 4 November 1940
- Commissioned: 7 November 1940
- Out of service: 11 November 1945

Norway
- Name: HNoMS Glomma
- Acquired: 11 November 1945
- Stricken: December 1961
- Identification: M309
- Fate: Stricken in December 1961

General characteristics
- Class & type: Bangor-class minesweeper
- Displacement: 605 tons
- Length: 162 ft (49.4 m)
- Beam: 28 ft (8.5 m)
- Draught: 8.25 ft (2.51 m)
- Propulsion: 2 shafts, 9-cylinder diesel, 2,000 bhp (1,500 kW)
- Speed: 16 knots (30 km/h)
- Complement: 60
- Armament: 1 × QF 12-pounder 3 in (76.2 mm) gun; 1 × quadruple 0.5 in (12.7 mm) Vickers machine gun Mark III

HMS Bangor was a Bangor-class minesweeper of the Royal Navy that served during the Second World War. She was built at the Harland & Wolff shipyard in Govan, Scotland. Bangor was the lead vessel of her class and one of the diesel-engined versions. She was ordered on 12 July 1939, laid down on 19 September 1939, launched on 23 May 1940, and commissioned on 7 November 1940. She is named after the Northern Ireland seaside town of the same name.

== Wartime service ==
On 18 November 1940 Bangor was assigned to the 9th Minesweeping Flotilla (MSF) based at Scapa Flow. On 12 February she was bombed whilst in the Moray Firth. No damage was done but her W/T was out of action and she retired to Aberdeen for repairs.

In March 1941, the 9th MSF transferred to the Portsmouth Command. On the morning of 19 May, Bangor and a group of minesweeping trawlers were attacked by nine Messerschmitt Bf 109s. Three bombs were dropped, aimed at Bangor, Darthema and Computator from a 200 ft (61 m) low attack. Darthema and Computator both suffered minor damage from near misses with no casualties. Bangor and Darthema claimed to have damaged two of the aircraft, which both retired southwards, making smoke and losing height. In December 1941 the flotilla moved its centre of operation to Harwich.

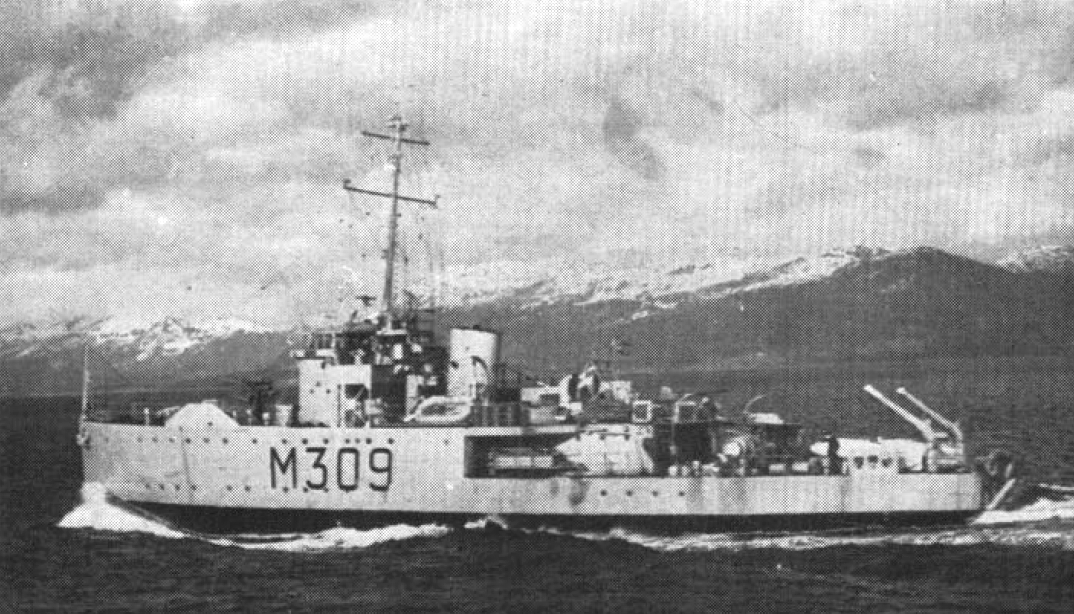
Bangor as HNoMS Glomma (M309)

In August 1942 Bangor was involved in Operation Jubilee – the raid on Dieppe. As a large area off Dieppe was believed to have been mined by the enemy, the minesweepers opened proceedings for the raid. During the afternoon of 18 August, the 9th and 13th MSFs sailed separately from Portsmouth for the vicinity of Beachy Head, so as to give the impression that one was carrying out a clearance sweep in the area, the other proceeding on passage up the channel. The 9th Flotilla commenced sweeping at 00:03 and at 01:05 turned to port and got in sweeps; the 13th Flotilla began 8 minutes earlier and finished at 00:51. Everything went without a hitch; the channel was about four cables wide, clearly marked on both sides and at the ends; only one mine was seen. The Flotillas then manoeuvred to keep clear of the approaching expedition and soon after 05:00 turned for home, setting flag Dan buoys to mark the channels in daylight on the way back. They returned in company to Portsmouth, having carried out their work with efficiency and precision.

In June 1944, Bangor was involved in Operation Neptune – the naval component of the D-Day landings in Normandy. The 9th Flotilla was part of Force J, sweeping channels. In the post assault phase the Flotilla was part of Task Force 129, which sailed from Portland on the night 24/25 June with the intention of bombarding Cherbourg. At 11:55 the minesweepers of Unit 1 (the 9th MSF) made their turn to sweep Fire Support Area 3, closely followed by the bombarding ships of group 1. As they entered the area they came under heavy fire; the German batteries had evidently been waiting until they were well within range. The destroyers, screening on the flanks, made smoke, but the enemy fire increased and after sweeping just three miles (half the intended distance) the minesweepers was forced to withdraw northwards.

In May 1945 Bangor was involved in minesweeping operations to Norway.

== Norwegian service ==
In June 1945 she was one of five Bangor-class minesweepers offered to the Royal Norwegian Navy on loan and was transferred on 11 November 1945. In October 1946 the Norwegian government decided to retain Bangor by purchase and was renamed Glomma. She was stricken in December 1961 and broken up.
