= USS Threat =

Minesweeper in the United States Navy

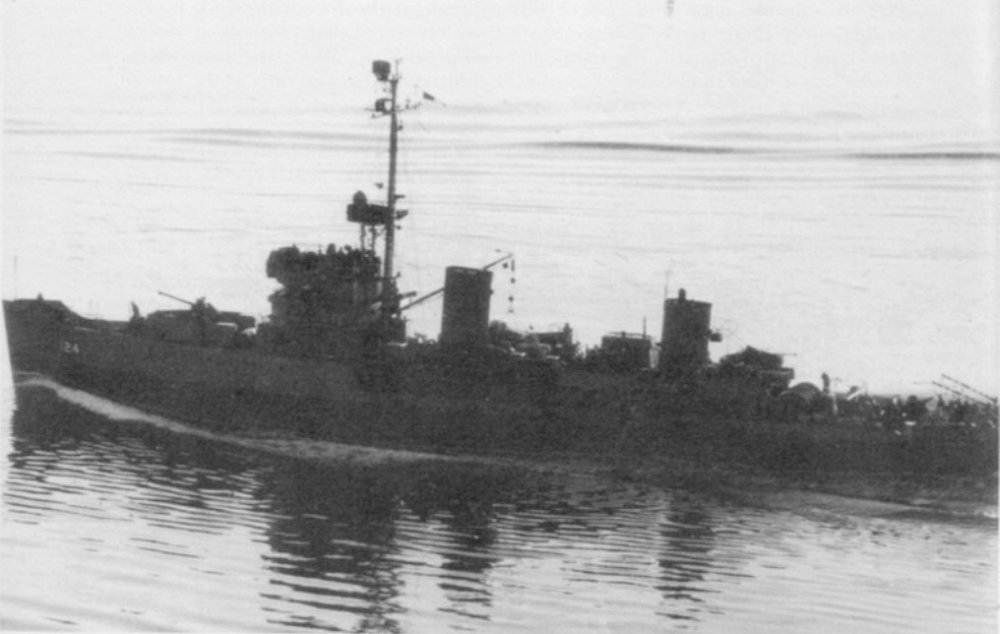

History

United States
- Name: USS Threat (AM-124)
- Builder: Savannah Machine and Foundry Co., Savannah, Georgia
- Laid down: 15 December 1941
- Launched: 15 August 1942
- Commissioned: 14 March 1943
- Decommissioned: 31 May 1946
- Reclassified: MSF-124, 7 February 1955
- Stricken: 1 July 1972
- Honours and awards: 3 battle stars (World War II)
- Fate: Sold to Mexico, 1973

Mexico
- Name: ARM Francisco Zarco (C81)
- Namesake: Francisco Zarco
- Acquired: 1973
- Reclassified: G13; P112, 1993
- Stricken: shakedown cruisein active service, as of 2007

General characteristics
- Class & type: Auk-class minesweeper
- Displacement: 890 long tons (904 t)
- Length: 221 ft 3 in (67.44 m)
- Beam: 32 ft (9.8 m)
- Draft: 10 ft 9 in (3.28 m)
- Speed: 18 knots (33 km/h; 21 mph)
- Complement: 105 officers and enlisted
- Armament: 2 × 3"/50 caliber gun; 4 × Oerlikon 20 mm guns; 2 × .30 cal (7.62 mm) machine guns; 4 × depth charge projectors; 2 × depth charge tracks

USS Threat (AM-124) was an Auk-class minesweeper acquired by the United States Navy for the dangerous task of removing mines from minefields laid in the water to prevent ships from passing.

Threat was laid down on 15 December 1941 at Savannah, Georgia, by the Savannah Machine and Foundry Co.; launched on 15 August 1942; sponsored by Mrs. Allan M. Robinson; and commissioned on 14 March 1943.

== Convoy operations to North Africa ==
In March and April 1943 Threat completed shakedown and exercises off the U.S. East Coast as she prepared for duty as a convoy escort on the Eastern Sea Frontier. During April, the minesweeper escorted convoys along the Atlantic coast; and, on 11 May, she got underway for her first transatlantic voyage. The convoy arrived at Casablanca on 1 June 1943, and, on 9 June, Threat departed North Africa with a convoy bound for New York. Throughout 1943, she continued escort duties in the Atlantic, completing three voyages to North Africa and numerous convoy shuttles along the Eastern Sea Frontier and into the Caribbean.

== European operations ==
Early in 1944, Threat helped to protect a convoy as it steamed via the Azores to the British Isles. After this mission, Threat remained in the Falmouth area for repairs. In April and May, she operated out of Batten Bay and conducted exercises with ships of the British Royal Navy in preparation for Operation Overlord, the invasion of Normandy.

== Operation Overlord ==
On 2 June 1944, the ship was sealed and briefing commenced. On 5 June 1944, Threat departed Tor Bay with a minesweeping unit to take part in Operation Neptune, the assault phase of Operation Overlord. Threat helped clear the channels to be used by fire support ships in the Baie de la Seine. In the days that followed, Threat witnessed the sinking by mines of Glennon (DD-620), Tide (AM-125), and Rich (DE-695). On 8 June, while aiding the disabled USS Rich, Threat narrowly missed becoming the victim of a mine that sank the destroyer escort off Cardonet Bank.

A shore battery fired on Threat as she was running acoustic and magnetic sweeps off Cherbourg on 9 June. The doughty minesweeper returned the fire with her 3-inch gun, silencing two shore gun employments and exploding a small ammunition dump. Commander, Mine Squadron 7, later commended Threat for her performance that day and gave special praise to the smart ship-handling operations that those operations had entailed.

Throughout June 1944, Threat continued to sweep waters off the French coast, occasionally drawing fire from German guns but escaping unscathed. While she swept channels for fire support ships in preparation for the bombardment of Cherbourg, she came under heavy fire from enemy emplacements. In July, Threat conducted daily sweeps of the Baie de la Seine, necessitated by the delayed action and time-release settings of mines left by the German forces.

== Supporting the invasion of southern France ==
After replenishment at Plymouth, England, late in July, Threat returned to the Mediterranean. In August, she escorted convoys between Gibraltar and North Africa before proceeding to Corsica where she cleared shipping channels despite the activity of enemy planes. On 19 August, she got underway for assault areas on the southern coast of France. Operating out of St. Tropez and the Golfe de Fos, Threat conducted support activities for Operation Dragoon.

In September, Threat continued sweeps, patrols, and mine-watching missions off the coast of southern France. Following a quick run to Naples for provisions and fuel, she returned to the French coast to supply YMS's and continue minesweeping. Early in October, Threat escorted a convoy to Bizerte before engaging in visual sweeps for mines off the German-held Italian coast. While pursuing these duties, Threat exchanged gunfire with enemy shore batteries on more than one occasion before returning to French waters late in October.

Throughout November, Threat operated off France's southern coast. She cleared fire support channels and patrolled for floating mines in the area between Cannes and Sanremo, before departing Cannes on 27 November 1944 for provisioning and ammunition replenishment at Bizerte.

The sweeper continued operations in the western Mediterranean in December. Early in the month, she swept mines off Cagliari, Sardinia; and, on 28 December, she departed Oran, escorting TG 81.14 bound for American ports. On 17 January 1945, she reached Norfolk after nearly a year of action in European waters.

== Stateside overhaul ==
Threat remained on the east coast for major overhaul and the installation of SA-2 radar until 26 April when she departed Miami, Florida and steamed, via the Panama Canal Zone and San Diego, California, for Hawaii. She reached Pearl Harbor on 26 May 1945 and commenced gunnery and minesweeping exercises in preparation for her new assignment in the Pacific Ocean. On 11 June, she got underway for Ulithi where she rendezvoused with an Okinawa-bound convoy.

== Pacific Ocean operations ==
After her arrival at Buckner Bay on 6 July, Threat soon joined sweeping operations in the East China Sea. She continued these duties after V-J Day in August and, in September, took part in the clearing of heavily mined Tsugaru Strait in preparation for the occupation of Ominato. Through October and November, Threat continued sweeps in the East China Sea operating out of Honshū and Sasebo. In December, she plied the waters off Shanghai before setting course for San Diego and inactivation.

== Decommissioning ==
Threat was decommissioned on 31 May 1946. Although she was reclassified as a steel-hulled fleet minesweeper (MSF-124) on 7 February 1955, Threat never resumed active service in the U.S. Navy, and was ultimately struck from the Naval Vessel Register on 1 July 1972. Transferred to the government of Mexico along with several sister-ships during 1973, she was renamed ARM Francisco Zarco (C81). Her pennant number was later changed to G13, and changed a final time to P112 in 1993. As of 2007, Francisco Zarco was in active service with the Mexican Navy.

== Awards ==
Threat received three battle stars for World War II service.
