= USS Pheasant =

Minesweeper of the United States Navy

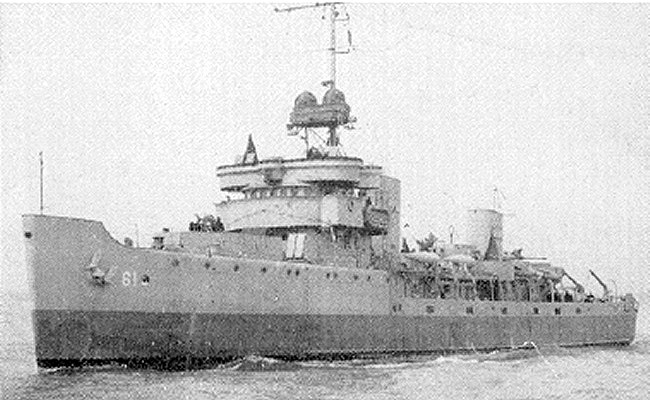

History

United States
- Name: USS Pheasant
- Builder: Defoe Shipbuilding Company, Bay City, Michigan
- Laid down: 22 July 1942
- Launched: 24 October 1942
- Commissioned: 12 December 1943
- Decommissioned: December 1945
- Reclassified: MSF-61, 7 February 1965
- Stricken: 1 December 1966
- Honours and awards: 2 battle stars (World War II)
- Fate: Sunk as target

General characteristics
- Class & type: Auk-class minesweeper
- Displacement: 890 long tons (904 t)
- Length: 221 ft 3 in (67.44 m)
- Beam: 32 ft (9.8 m)
- Draft: 10 ft 9 in (3.28 m)
- Speed: 18 knots (33 km/h; 21 mph)
- Complement: 100 officers and enlisted
- Armament: 1 × 3"/50 caliber gun; 2 × 40 mm guns; 8 × 20 mm guns; 2 × Depth charge tracks

USS Pheasant (AM-61/MSF-61) was an Auk-class minesweeper named after the Pheasant, a large game bird found in the United States and other countries. Pheasant was laid down on 22 July 1942 at the Defoe Shipbuilding Company in Bay City, Michigan; launched on 24 October 1942, sponsored by Mrs. Harry J. Defoe, wife of the shipyard owner; and commissioned on 12 December 1942.

Following fitting out at Boston, Massachusetts, Pheasant helped to protect convoys along the eastern and gulf coasts of the United States beginning in early 1943. Immediately preceding the Normandy invasion of 6 June 1944, she swept dangerous mines from fire support areas used by the battleships Texas and Arkansas. From 29 June until her departure for Oran, Algeria, on 15 July 1944, she cleared areas to be used for the invasion of Cherbourg, France. Later, in the Mediterranean, she made exploratory sweeps prior to the invasion of southern France. She swept successfully in the Mediterranean until May 1945 when she received orders to return to the United States.

Pheasant entered the Reserve Fleet at San Diego, California, in December 1945. She was reclassified MSF-61 on 7 February 1955, struck from the Naval Vessel Register on 1 December 1966, and later sunk as a target.

Pheasant received two battle stars for World War II service.

== See also ==
- Commander Mine Squadron SEVEN
