= Mine Squadron 7 =

United States Navy minelaying unit

Mine Squadron 7, (full: Commander, Mine Squadron 7, or alternately Mine Squadron SEVEN) is the designation for a United States Navy minelaying and retrieval command and unit. COMINRON SEVEN was assigned to the United States Pacific Fleet from some time before 1943 (exact date is unknown) until the unit's decommissioning in 1968. The word Commander in the unit's nomenclature refers both the entire unit, the headquarters section, and to the actual commanding officer.

== Mission and responsibilities ==
=== Mission of Commander Mine Squadron Seven ===
The mission and responsibilities of COMINRON SEVEN's command were:

Exercise operational control; coordinate shakedown and refresher training; coordinate activation and inactivation of ships assigned to Mine Squadron 7; conduct type training and support inter-type training for ships of Mine Squadron 7; provide ships and services to other commands; conduct trials and tests of Mine Squadron 7 ships, mines, and equipment; lay, actuate and recover mines; conduct training of personnel assigned; carry out special assignments as directed; emphasize maintenance and repair of Mine Squadron 7 ships and equipment in order to insure a high state of combat readiness; conduct training in defense against atomic (including radiological), bacteriological and chemical warfare and provide forces for search and rescue as required.

=== Mission of other ships attached to Mine Squadron 7 ===
USS Cove (MSI-1) and Cape (MSI-2) were inshore minesweepers. Their mission was to sweep sea mines. They were capable of sweeping magnetic, acoustic, combination magnetic-acoustic and contact sea mines in water as shallow as five fathoms. They operate within the Mine Force as "in service" craft. They also acted as danning ships.

==== USS Greer County ====
The mission of Greer County (LST-799) was to provide mobile logistic support for minecraft. The ship carried machinery, repair parts, electrical repair parts and tubes, minesweeping spares, GSK material provisions, the ship's store stock, clothing and small stores. The ship also functioned as the flagship for Commander Mine Squadron 7.

==== USS Mulberry ====
The mission of Mulberry (AN-27) was to transport, lay and recover mines and buoys. Mulberry was capable of laying, maintaining and recovering anti-submarine nets and associated harbor defense equipment, and operated as net gate ship.

== WWII history ==
Mine Squadron 7 was established at an unknown date. Records available at this command (located at Long Beach Naval Station) begin January 1943.

In January 1943 Commander Mine Squadron 7, homeported in Norfolk, Virginia, and commanded by Captain A. G. Cook, Jr., was composed of approximately thirteen ships of the AM (Minesweeper) and DMS (Destroyer Minesweeper) class. COMINRON SEVEN at this time was undergoing intensive training of fire spotting practice, maneuvers and escort work. The feasibility of these ships for anti-submarine work was being tested and the anti-aircraft armament was being increased.

In June 1944 COMINRON SEVEN was deployed off the shores of France, engaged in minesweeping operations and participated in the invasion of France in June 1944. The squadron lost several ships sunk by mines and torpedoes.

In July 1944 ships of COMINRON SEVEN swept enemy mines along the south coast of England, operating under Commander Task Force 125 and Commander Task Force 129 and further participated in the Bombardment of Cherbourg.

In September 1944 Commander Mine Squadron 7 as Commander Task Unit 80.10.3 composed of Mine Divisions 16 and 21, ten YMSs (Auxiliary Motor Minesweepers), three SCs (Submarine chasers), and twelve LCVPs, operated in the Marseille, France, area carrying out the tasks of harbor clearance and clearance of Port St. Louis, and canal, and other channels and areas.

In October 1944, having completed all clearance commitments at Marseille during September, COMINRON SEVEN continued daily maintenance sweeps of approach channels and anchorage areas.

In November 1944 Commander Mine Squadron 7 operated under Commander 8th Fleet with Mine Division 21 remaining at Bizerte, Tunisia, for maintenance and training while the squadron commander (temporarily aboard Chickadee (AM-59)) supervised sweeping operations in the Cannes, Golfe-Juan area, and another group assisted ships of Mine Division 32 in sweeping the Tunisian war channel. At this time COMINRON SEVEN was assigned the additional duty of Commander Escort Sweeper Group, Eighth Amphibious Force.

During December 1944 Mine Squadron 7 was operating on several commitments under commander 8th Fleet. One group of ships of Mine Division 21 were undergoing repairs and maintenance, while the others were sweeping in areas off southern France and Magdalena. Ships of Mine Division 18, composing the other divisions of MinRon 7, were operating at Bizerte undergoing repairs for return to the United States, departing the latter part of the month. While at Bizerte during the period 24 November to 24 December 1944, COMINRON SEVEN served in the additional capacity of Commander Escort Sweeper Group, 8th Fleet, and had charge of all U.S. naval sweeping units of the Mediterranean theatre.

During January 1945 COMINRON SEVEN was engaged in supervising and coordinating sweeping operations and furnishing supplies to all minesweeping units operating under Amphibious Force, 8th Fleet. These units were composed of ships of Mine Divisions 21 and 32, and YMSs.

During February 1945 COMINRON SEVEN was engaged in supervising and coordinating all sweeping operations and distribution of supplies, mail and personnel to all minesweeping units operating under Commander Amphibious Force, 8th Fleet.

== Post-war structure ==
Mine Squadron 7 was disestablished in 1946 and reestablished at unknown date, the earliest records available after disestablishment being in late 1954.

From 1954 to 1956, Mine Squadron 7 was composed of:

Commander Mine Squadron 7
Greer County (LST-799) (Flagship); Mulberry (AN-27); Shea (DM-30)
Mine Division 71	Mine Division 72
Dextrous (MSF-341); Redstart (MSF-378); Surfbird (MSF-383); Waxwing (MSF-389); Ptarmigan (MSF-376); Toucan (MSF-387)	Shoveler (MSF-382); Ruddy (MSF-380); Zeal (MSF-131); Symbol (MSF-123); Murrelet (MSF-372); Swift (MSF-122); Cormorant (MSC-122); Peacock (MSC-198); Phoebe (MSC-199); Vireo (MSC-205); Warbler (MSC-206); Whippoorwill (MSC-207); Widgeon (MSC-208); Woodpecker (MSC-209)

== Post-war history and organization ==
In 1956, several MSFs were decommissioned or redeployed. The entire Squadron was reorganized. MSCs from Mine Division 92 became the new Mine Division 71, while MSCs from Mine Division 94 became Mine Division 72, and MSCs from Mine Division 96 became Mine Division 73. Shea, assigned to COMINRON SEVEN was decommissioned in early 1958. Greer County and Mulberry remain part of COMINRON SEVEN. Since becoming Mine Squadron 7's Flagship in late 1956, Greer County participated in various local and interservice operations, including PACMINEX of 1957, 1958, and 1959, PACPHIBLEX of 1958 and 1959, and operated with COMINDIV 73 in exercise PACSWEEPEX 3. Mulberry, being the only minelayer in EASTPAC, has participated in many exercises and operations in the capacity of mine/buoy layer and recoverer. Those operations included fleet service mine tests, all PACMINEXs and PACPHIBLEXs.

=== Mine Division 71 ===
COMINRON SEVEN received two new prototype inshore minesweepers for evaluation; Cove (MSI-1) in November 1958, and Cape (MSI-2) in February 1959. Cape had an allowance of eighteen enlisted personnel and three officers and can remain at sea for a period of 5–7 days. Cove participated in PACMINEX 2–59. Both vessels underwent mine countermeasures refresher training. In 1952, Mine Division 71 became Mine Division 92. From July 1954 until July 1955, this division was employed in type training in the Long Beach, California area under operational control of Commander Task Group 59.2. During this period, much time was spent in the Naval Shipyard to correct design faults of these new type ships.

In July 1955, Mine Division 92 deployed to the Western Pacific and reported to Commander Mine Flotilla 1 for operational control. Type training was conducted off the coast of Korea. In February 1956, the division returned to Long Beach. From then until January 1958, the division operated in the Long Beach area conducting type training. In April 1957, all ships visited Acapulco, Mexico. Also in April 1957 and in conjunction with a reorganization of the Mine Force, Pacific Fleet, Mine Division 92 became Mine Division 71. In January 1958, the division again deployed to the Western Pacific for operations under operational control of Commander Mine Flotilla 1. The division returned to Long Beach in July 1958. In September, all ships participated in the minesweeping phase of an amphibious exercise at Oceanside, California. The remainder of 1958 was spent in holiday leave and upkeep.

=== Mine Division 72 ===
Mine Division 72 was reinforced with five non-magnetic wooden-hulled Aggressive-class minesweepers. They were Embattle (MSO-434), Firm (MSO-444), Force (MSO-445), Prime (MSO-466), and Reaper (MSO-467). These ships were constructed on the West Coast of the United States and were commissioned in late 1954 and early 1955. The ships were originally assigned to Mine Division 94, however in 1957 that unit was merged into Mine Division 72. Originally the ships were commissioned as "AM" with their particular hull numbers assigned. On 1 January 1955 the ships in Mine Division 72, as with other ships of their type, were redesignated MSO (Minesweeper Ocean).

=== Mine Division 73 ===
Mine Division 73 was composed of Esteem (MSO-438), Acme (MSO-508), Conquest (MSO-488), Gallant (MSO-489) and Pledge (MSO-492). They were commissioned in the summer of 1955, spring and summer of 1956. Mine Division 73 came into being in January 1957. In February 1957, Mine Division 73 was making preparation for deployment to the Western Pacific, departing Long Beach on 4 March 1957. Routine minesweeping operations and several joint minesweeping exercises with the Chinese and Korean navies were conducted while deployed. The division left the shipyard in February 1958 and underwent refresher and mine countermeasures training.

=== Decommissioning ===
Commander Mine Squadron 7 was located in Building 145, Long Beach Naval Station, when it was disestablished on 1 June 1968.
