= USS Acme (MSO-508) =

Minesweeper of the United States Navy

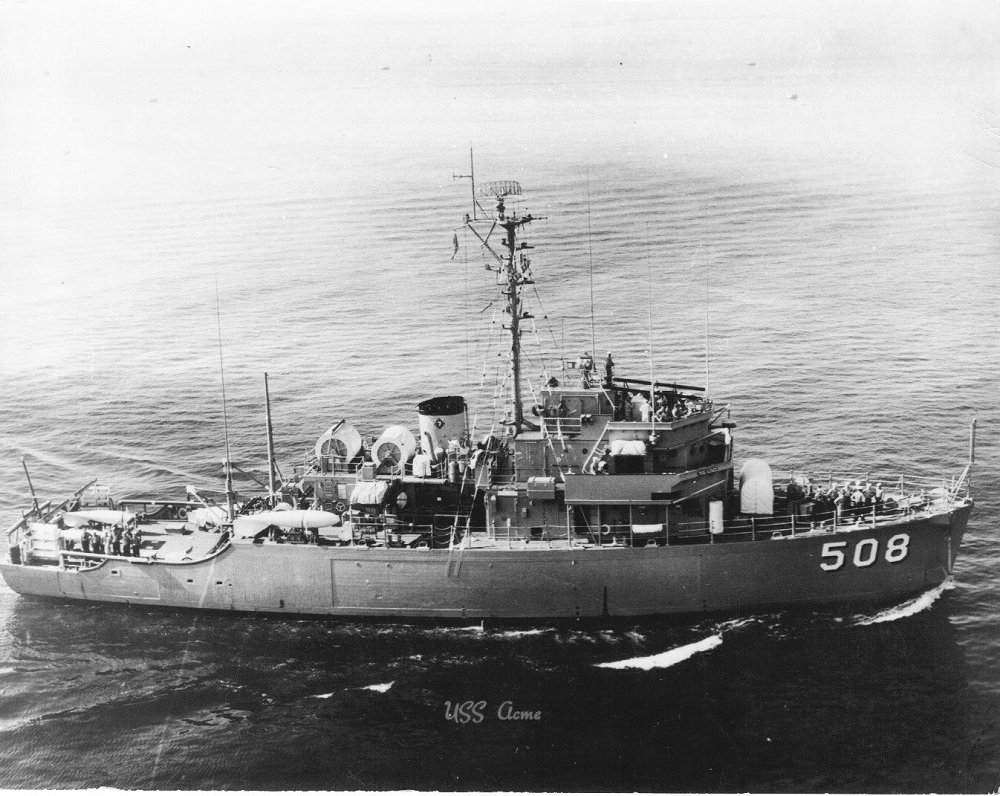

History

United States
- Name: USS Acme
- Builder: Frank L. Sample Shipyard, Boothbay Harbor, Maine
- Laid down: 16 November 1954
- Launched: 23 June 1955
- Commissioned: 27 September 1956
- Decommissioned: 6 November 1970
- Stricken: 15 May 1976
- Honors and awards: 2 battle stars (Vietnam)
- Fate: Sold for scrap, 6 January 1977

General characteristics
- Class & type: Acme-class minesweeper
- Displacement: 633 long tons (643 t)
- Length: 172 ft (52 m)
- Beam: 35 ft (11 m)
- Draft: 10 ft (3.0 m)
- Speed: 15 knots (28 km/h; 17 mph)
- Complement: 80
- Armament: 1 × 40 mm gun

USS Acme (MSO-508) was an Acme-class minesweeper acquired by the United States Navy for the task of removing mines that had been placed in the water to prevent the safe passage of ships.

Acme was laid down on 16 November 1954 by the Frank L. Sample Shipyard, Boothbay Harbor, Maine; launched on 23 June 1955; sponsored by Mrs. Cornelius M. Sullivan, the wife of Capt. Sullivan who was then serving as chief of staff of the 3rd Naval District; and commissioned on 27 September 1956.

== First Far East deployment ==
Following shakedown along the U.S. East Coast, the ocean minesweeper proceeded, via the Panama Canal, to the west coast. She arrived at Long Beach, California, on 8 December and was assigned to Mine Division 73, Mine Squadron 7. After a short upkeep period, Acme got underway on 4 March 1956 for a deployment to the Far East, During this cruise, she visited Pearl Harbor, Hong Kong, and various ports in Korea, Taiwan, and Japan before returning home on 20 August.

== West Coast activities ==
On 7 October, the vessel entered the Long Beach Naval Shipyard for extensive sound reduction repair work which was completed on 6 March 1958. She next participated in a training program as a unit of Mine Force, Pacific Fleet. In October 1958, she took part in a joint operation with the Royal Canadian Navy off the coast of British Columbia.

The ship began the year 1959 operating in the Long Beach, California area. In April, she began a three-week period of refresher training at San Diego. Next, Acme undertook a mine countermeasures refresher training program at Port Hueneme, California.

== Second Far East deployment ==
On 17 August, she deployed to the Far East with Mine Division 73. Following stops at Pearl Harbor and Midway Island, the minesweeper arrived at Yokosuka, Japan, on 14 September. A fortnight later, she moved to Sasebo and continued to operate in Japanese and Korean waters through mid-December. She visited Fukuoka and Kure, Japan, and Pusan and Chinhae, Korea. She also participated in joint minesweeping operations with the Republic of Korea Navy at Chinhae and with the Japanese Maritime Self-Defense Force at Kure. On 17 December, Acme got underway and proceeded independently to Hong Kong, where she arrived on 22 December and rejoined other sweepers of Mine Division 73. On 30 December, the ship arrived at Subic Bay, Philippines.

After beginning 1960 in an upkeep status at Subic Bay, Acme arrived in Bangkok, Thailand, on 13 January. Following five days of liberty in Bangkok, she got underway with units of the Royal Thai Navy and conducted tactical exercises en route to Sattahip. The exercises were completed on 22 January, and Acme returned to Subic Bay on 29 January. Following a week of voyage repairs, she sailed on 8 February for her home port, Long Beach, and made brief stops at Guam, Midway Island, and Pearl Harbor before reaching California on 13 March.

== West Coast activities ==
The ship participated in a joint United States-Canadian mine-sweeping exercise in the Long Beach area from 18 to 23 April; then began four months of availability. On 15 August, she got underway for Esquimalt, British Columbia, to rendezvous with Canadian naval forces for joint exercises which continued into September. On the 10th, Acme returned to Long Beach and, from 26 October through 6 November, took part in exercises with Canadian units off Camp Pendleton, California. Acme returned to Long Beach on 15 November and remained there through the end of the year, 1960.

The minesweeper began another overhaul on 13 January 1961. Previously, she had been chosen to test special mine countermeasures equipment; and, during this yard period, it was installed. The ship got underway on 29 May, conducted refresher training at San Diego, and returned to Long Beach early in July. For the next two months, technical and operational checks were made on Acme's experimental equipment. From 28 August to 10 September, Acme held type training. On 13 September, the ship got underway to take part in Operation Gray Fox, a mine warfare exercise held along the California coast. She finished this task on 30 September and returned to Long Beach. From 2 to 27 October, Acme was in restricted availability for installation of more equipment and put to sea on 7 November for shakedown. She returned to her home port on 22 November and spent the remainder of the year in an upkeep and leave period.

== Experimental equipment operations ==
Acme spent the year 1962 conducting tests and operational evaluations of her new mine countermeasures equipment which took her to various points along the California coast. This routine was broken by periods of upkeep and drydocking before the vessel ended the year anchored in Long Beach.

The first two months of 1963 saw her continuing experimental work. From 2 to 23 March, she participated in "Operation Steelgate", with Canadian forces off the California coast near Camp Pendleton. After a week of liberty in San Francisco, Acme returned to Long Beach for an overhaul which was followed by three weeks of refresher training out of San Diego. Upon her return to Long Beach on 2 August, Acme took part in an operational evaluation of Seanettle, an underwater electronic system. From mid-September through 10 November, she held type training and returned to Long Beach on the 21st.

Acme got underway for type training on 6 January 1964 and spent most of February assisting in the evaluation of the Seanettle system. From 24 February to 10 March, she conducted mine countermeasures operations off Santa Rosa Island, California and then devoted the next seven weeks to a tender availability. On 27 April, she commenced training operations in the area off Huntington Beach, California, and Santa Catalina Island. Following completion of shakedown, she began alternating mine recovery operations off the California coast with periods of upkeep at Long Beach. The sweeper completed her operations on 7 December and entered a holiday leave and upkeep status.

Acme entered the Long Beach Naval Shipyard on 11 January 1965 for the installation of a new sonar system. She was underway on 8 March and sailed to the naval electronics laboratory at San Diego for tests and evaluations of her newly installed equipment. The ship returned to Long Beach on 27 May and began preparations for major yard work. On 7 June, she arrived at the Harbor Boat Building Company in Long Beach for repairs which lasted until 19 August. Then came two months of exercises. On 22 November, Acme began further evaluation of experimental equipment. In mid-December, she spent one week in mine hunting operations before returning to Long Beach on 20 December.

From mid-January until May 1966, Acme evaluated her mine hunting and surveillance system before sailing north and participating in the Portland Rose Festival in Portland, Oregon, from 8 until 13 June. The minesweeper participated as a unit of Mine Squadron 7 in a mine exercise at Santa Rosa Island from 18 to 28 July. Following a month of restricted availability at Long Beach, she took part in Exercises "Eager Angler" and "Baseline II." During November, the ship conducted type training and closed the year at Long Beach in a leave and upkeep status.

== Escorting the SS Queen Mary ==
During the first four months of 1967, Acme was involved in various minesweeping exercises. On 1 May, she entered the Long Beach Naval Shipyard for a restricted availability during which all of her experimental equipment was removed, thus ending her research and development efforts. The availability concluded on 4 August; but the ship began a regular overhaul on 1 September at San Pedro, California. During this time, a twin 20-millimeter gun was mounted on the vessel's forecastle. She got underway on 9 December and sailed with five other minesweepers to rendezvous with the RMS Queen Mary. They escorted her on her last voyage into the port of Long Beach.

== Third Far East tour of duty ==
Acme held refresher training from 3 to 19 January 1968. On 28 January, she and 13 other minesweepers were alerted to prepare for an emergency deployment in view of the capture of USS Pueblo (AGER-2) by the North Koreans. By the first week of February, it became apparent that a deployment would not be necessary; and Acme began preparations for mine countermeasures refresher training and an ensuing upkeep period. On 1 April, she sailed for the western Pacific Ocean. Ten days later, she arrived at Pearl Harbor and, after two days of replenishment, got underway with units of Mine Division 94 and Force (MSO-445) to participate in Operation "Barstur." On 14 April, Acme resumed her voyage west and arrived at Yokosuka, Japan, on 4 May. The vessel departed that port on 17 May, bound for Chinhae, Korea, and a joint American-Korean exercise. She returned to Sasebo on 28 May and began preparations for a deployment off the coast of Vietnam. On 6 June, Acme relieved Firm (MSO-444) as a barrier patrol ship. She was in turn relieved on 9 July and sailed to Singapore for an availability period. On 30 July, she sailed to Bangkok, Thailand, for a joint exercise with British and Thai naval forces. Upon arrival at Sattahip, Acme developed engineering problems. The vessel was detached from the exercise and sailed to Subic Bay for repairs. She got underway again on 2 September bound for Danang. Upon her arrival there, the engineering problems recurred, and Acme was rerouted to the Philippines. She finished the passage to Subic Bay under tow by Lowry (DD-770) and finally reached the American naval base on 15 September.

Acme set sail for the United States on 27 October. En route, she made port calls at Guam, Kwajalein, the Johnston Island, and Pearl Harbor; arrived at Long Beach on 3 December; and spent the rest of the year in leave and upkeep.

== Stateside repairs and trials ==
On 13 January 1969, Acme entered drydock at Terminal Island, California, for correction of difficulties with her controllable pitch propellers. The availability was completed on 20 March, and the minesweeper began sea trials. However, repeated casualties to the propeller system required further repair work before the ship was finally ready to return to duty on 21 April. Various training exercises occupied the ship from late April through July, and mine warfare Exercise "StrikeEx 3–69" kept her busy from 15 to 27 August.

== Fourth tour of duty in the Far East ==
Then, after two months of preparations for a deployment to the Far East, she departed for the western Pacific. She stopped briefly at Pearl Harbor, Johnston Island, and Kwajalein for minor repairs, stores, and fuel, and remained at Guam in upkeep from 2 until 8 December, before proceeding to Subic Bay. The minesweeper steamed on to the Vietnamese coast where, on 19 December 1969, she relieved Excel (MSO-439) and assumed "Operation Market Time" patrol duties which lasted through 11 January 1970, the day the ship put into port at Subic Bay.

After a month of leave and upkeep, Acme began her last Market Time patrol on 12 February. She remained off the coast for almost two months before returning to Subic Bay on 6 April. Acme sailed to Keelung, Taiwan, on 25 April and pushed on to Sasebo, Japan, on 4 May. From this port, Acme began her journey back to Long Beach. Pausing briefly at Pearl Harbor, Acme reached her home port on 9 June. Her next action came on 14 August, when Acme took part in Operation "High Desert" off the southern California coast. The minesweeper was back in Long Beach on 21 August.

== Decommissioning ==
On 1 September, Acme reported to the Naval Inactive Ship Facility, Long Beach, for deactivation. She was decommissioned on 6 November 1970, and her name was struck from the Navy list on 15 May 1976. She was sold on 6 January 1977 to Oskco Edwards, of Capistrano Beach, California.

== Awards ==
Acme received two battle stars for her Vietnam service.
