= Division (naval) =

Smallest naval formation

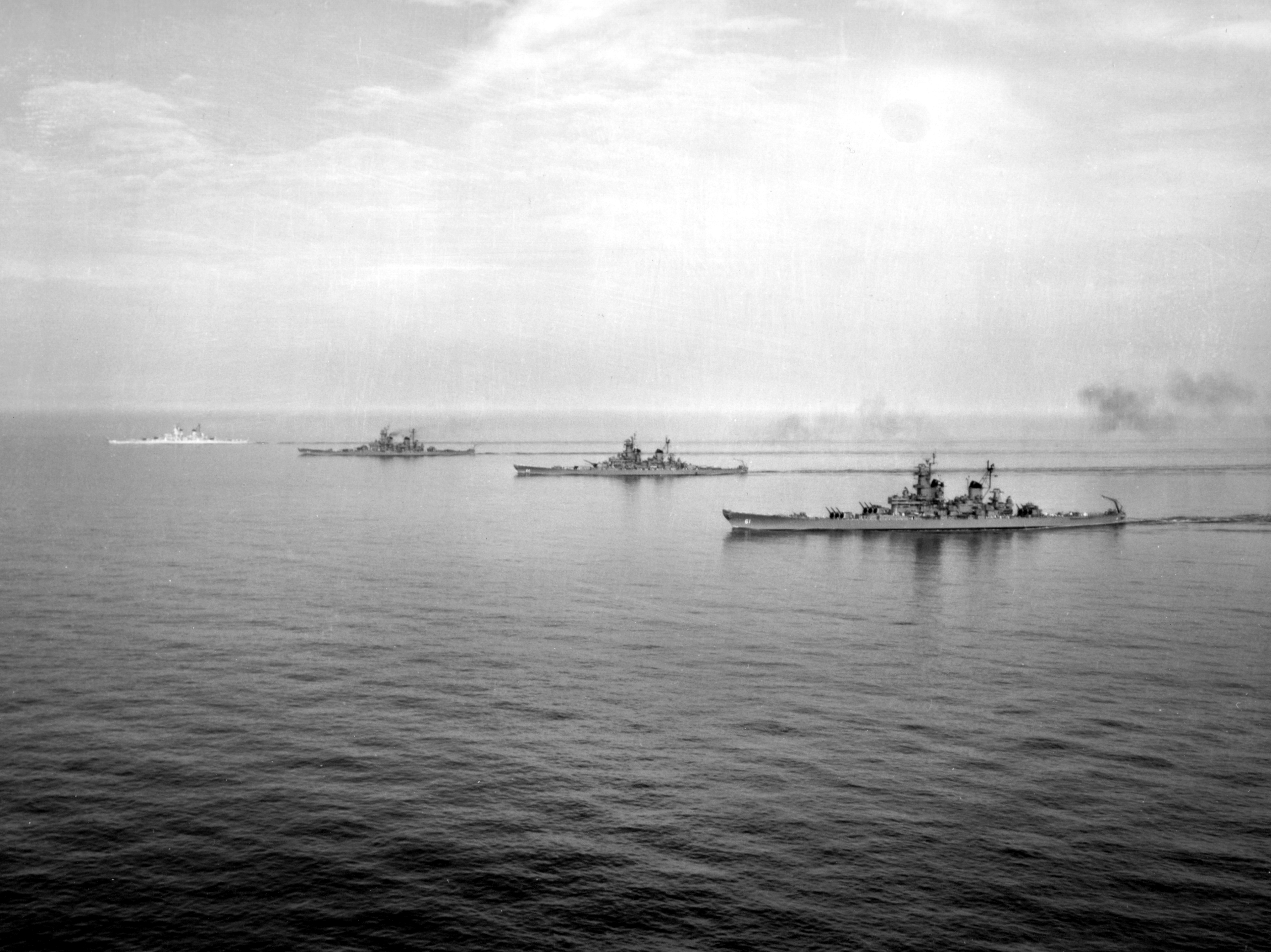
The four Iowa-class battleships operating as Battleship Division 2 off the Virginia Capes in 1954; from front to back are USS Iowa (BB-61), USS Wisconsin (BB-64), USS Missouri (BB-63), and USS New Jersey (BB-62).

A naval division is a sub-division of a squadron or flotilla of a navy. It can also be a sub-division of a fleet. A division is the smallest naval formation, most commonly numbering between two and four ships.

== Command element ==
A division is usually commanded by senior flag officer, most commonly a vice admiral or rear admiral, irrespective of the division's size. For example, in the Imperial Japanese Navy, the First Carrier Division was commanded by a rear or vice admiral, same as the 18th Cruiser Division.

== Division types ==
Divisions are most commonly grouped by ship class and type, dependent on how the respective nation's navy is organised. Examples of division types include:

Submarine Division	24th Submarine Division (Soviet Navy and Russian Navy)	six submarines
Minesweeper Division	Mine Division 71 (United States Navy)	two minesweepers
Sloop Division	2nd Escort Group (Royal Navy)	six sloops
Destroyer Division	Destroyer Division 22 (United States Navy)	four destroyers
Cruiser Division	18th Cruiser Division (Imperial Japanese Navy)	two light cruisers
Battleship Division	Battleship Division 2 (United States Navy)	four battleships
Carrier Division	Second Carrier Division (Imperial Japanese Navy)	two aircraft carriers

== See also ==
- BatDiv
- Destroyer squadron
