= H101 =

H101 may refer to:

- H101 virus, the first oncolytic virus to be approved by a regulatory agency
- Glasflügel H-101
- BAE Orion (H-101), a ship of the Ecuadorian Navy
