= USS Ptarmigan =

United States Navy minesweeper

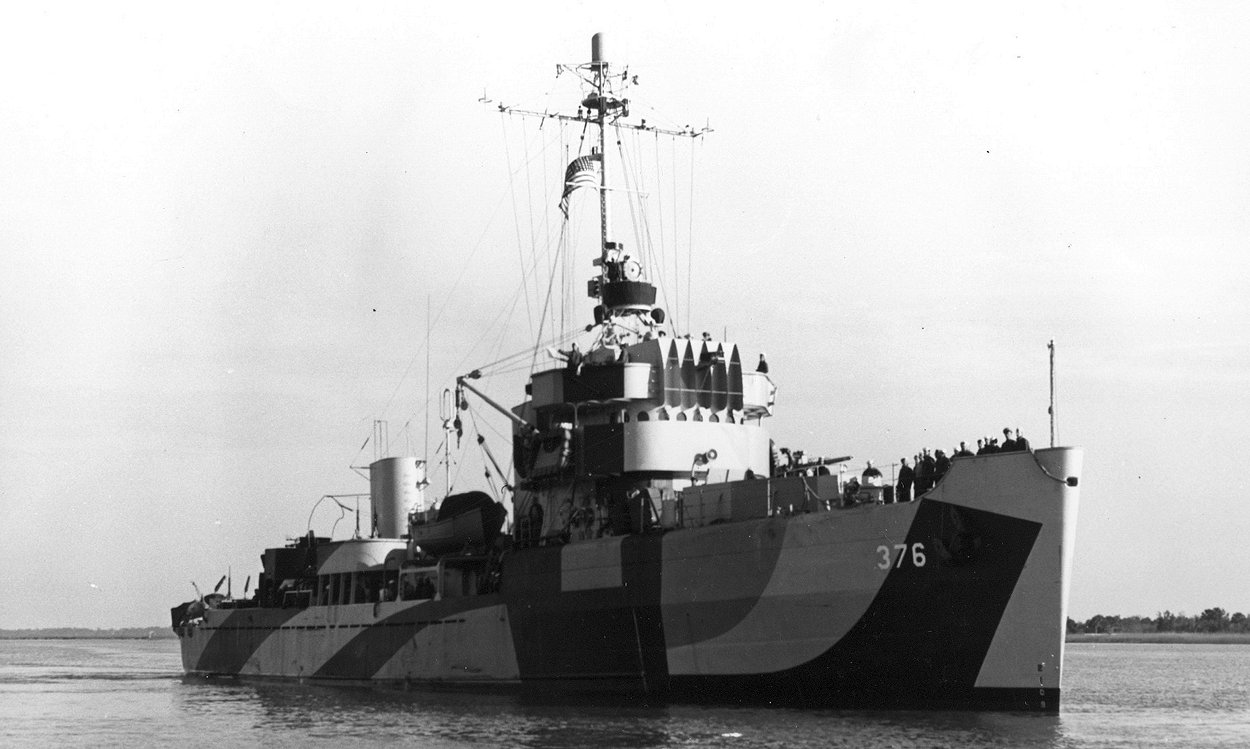
- Ptarmigan at Little Creek, Virginia on 13 March 1945

History

United States
- Name: USS Ptarmigan
- Builder: Savannah Machine and Foundry Co., Savannah, Georgia
- Laid down: 9 March 1944
- Launched: 15 July 1944
- Commissioned: 15 January 1945
- Decommissioned: 3 June 1946
- Recommissioned: 28 October 1950
- Reclassified: MSF-376, 7 February 1955
- Decommissioned: 17 May 1957
- Stricken: 1 July 1963
- Honours and awards: 1 battle star (World War II); 4 battle stars (South Korea)
- Fate: Transferred to South Korea, 25 July 1963

History

South Korea
- Name: ROKS Sinseong (PCE-1001)
- Namesake: Sinseong
- Acquired: 25 July 1963
- Stricken: 1984
- Fate: Unknown

General characteristics
- Class & type: Auk-class minesweeper
- Displacement: 890 long tons (904 t)
- Length: 221 ft 3 in (67.44 m)
- Beam: 32 ft (9.8 m)
- Draft: 10 ft 9 in (3.28 m)
- Speed: 18 knots (33 km/h; 21 mph)
- Complement: 100 officers and enlisted
- Armament: 1 × 3"/50 caliber gun; 2 × 40 mm guns; 2 × 20 mm guns; 2 × Depth charge tracks

USS Ptarmigan (AM-376) was an Auk-class minesweeper acquired by the United States Navy for the dangerous task of removing mines from minefields laid in the water to prevent ships from passing. She was the only U.S. Navy ship named for the ptarmigan, a grouse with feathered feet, found in northern regions.

Ptarmigan was laid down 9 March 1944 by Savannah Machine and Foundry Co., Savannah, Georgia; launched 15 July 1944, sponsored by Miss Jeanne Summerlin; and commissioned 15 January 1945.

== Service history ==
=== World War II ===
Ptarmigan departed for the Pacific Ocean 1 May 1945. Following duty off Hawaii and Saipan, she operated out of Sasebo, Japan, clearing mines off Honshū from late September to late October. Departing Sasebo in February 1946, she arrived San Pedro, California, in March. Decommissioned 3 June 1946, she entered the Pacific Reserve Fleet.

=== Korean war ===
Ptarmigan recommissioned 28 October 1950. She arrived in Japan in June 1951. During the Korean War, she destroyed mines in Hungnam Bay, and near Chonjin and Chaho. With Redstart (AM-378) she patrolled the Korean coast along Hŭngnam, Chaho, Songjin, and Wonsan to prevent enemy sampans from laying mines. Leaving Sasebo in May 1952 and arriving Long Beach, California, in June, she received new guns and radar. Departing Long Beach May 1953 and returning to Sasebo in June, she operated off Hungnam, Inchon, Pusan, and Choto Island, before returning to Long Beach in December.

=== Post-war operations ===
Sailing from Long Beach in July 1954 to join the 7th Fleet, she patrolled the Korean coast, and in February 1955 assisted in the evacuation of the Tachen Islands during the First Taiwan Strait Crisis. Reclassified MSF-376 on 7 February, she returned to Long Beach in March for duty off California and Mexico. In latter 1956, as part of the 7th Fleet, she participated in training maneuvers out of Keelung, Taiwan.

Decommissioned 17 May 1957 at Astoria, Oregon she entered the Pacific Reserve Fleet. Struck from the Naval Vessel Register on 1 July 1963, she was transferred under the Military Assistance Program to the Republic of Korea on 25 July, to serve as Shin Song (PCE-1001).

== Awards ==
Ptarmigan received one battle star for World War II service, and four stars for Korean service.

== See also ==
- Commander Mine Squadron SEVEN
