= USS Ampere =

Admirable-class minesweeper

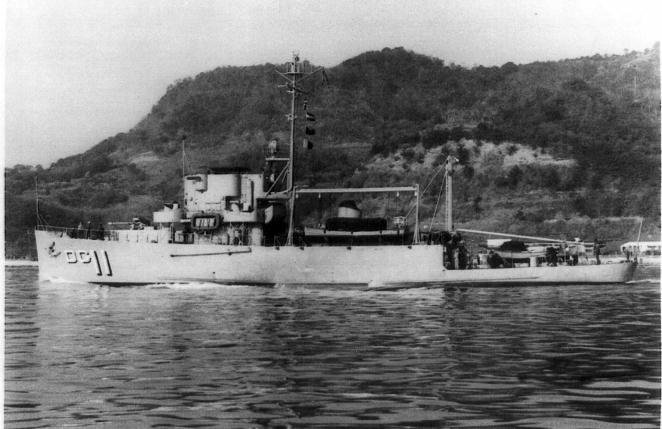
- USS Ampere (ADG-11), heads out to sea c. 1955/1956.

History

United States
- Name: PCE-919; Drake (1943–1945); YDG-11 (1945–1955)
- Namesake: A male Duck
- Builder: Willamette Iron and Steel Works, Portland, Oregon
- Laid down: 24 November 1943
- Launched: 12 August 1944
- In service: 15 August 1945
- Out of service: 1 November 1947
- Renamed: Drake, 24 November 1943; YDG-11, 20 April 1945; ADG-11, 1 November 1947
- Reclassified: Minesweeper, 24 November 1943; District Degaussing Vessel, 20 April 1945; Degaussing Ship, 1 November 1947
- Identification: Hull symbol: PCE-919; Hull symbol: AM-359; Hull symbol: YDG-11; Hull symbol: ADG-11; Code letters: NHYV (Drake); Code letters: NJZK
- Fate: laid up in the Pacific Reserve Fleet, San Diego Group, November 1947

United States
- Name: ADG-11
- In service: July 1951
- Out of service: February 1957
- Renamed: Ampere, 1 February 1955
- Stricken: 1 July 1961
- Home port: Yokosuka, Japan (1951–1954); Sasebo, Japan (1954–1957)
- Identification: Hull symbol: ADG-11
- Fate: Sold, 21 June 1962

Philippines
- Owner: Philippine President Lines, Manila
- Acquired: 21 June 1962
- Status: unknown

General characteristics
- Class & type: Admirable-class minesweeper
- Displacement: 625 long tons (635 t)
- Length: 184 ft 6 in (56.24 m)
- Beam: 33 ft (10 m)
- Draft: 9 ft 9 in (2.97 m)
- Installed power: 2 × Busch-Sulzer 539 diesel engines; 1,710 shp (1,280 kW)
- Propulsion: Farrel-Birmingham single reduction gear; 2 × propellers
- Speed: 14 kn (26 km/h; 16 mph)
- Complement: 68
- Armament: 1 × 3 in (76 mm)/50 caliber dual-purpose (DP) gun

Service record
- Part of: Pacific Reserve Fleet (1946-51, 1957-61); US Pacific Fleet (1951-57)

USS Ampere (PCE-919/AM-359/YDG-11/ADG-11) was originally planned as a PCE-905-class patrol craft for the United States Navy, PCE-919, and laid down as an Admirable-class minesweeper, named Drake, for the male duck. Before she was commissioned, her name was cancelled and she was reclassified as a District Degaussing Vessel. She was later renamed Ampere, after the ampere, a unit of electric current, which takes its name from the French physicist André-Marie Ampère.

== Design ==
Ampere was 184 ft 6 in (56.24 m) long, 33 ft (10 m) wide, had a draft of 9 ft 9 in (2.97 m), and displaced 625 long tons (635 t). She had an average speed of 14 kn (26 km/h; 16 mph). She had a complement of 68 men, and was armed only with a 3 in (76 mm)/50 caliber dual-purpose (DP) gun. She was propelled by two Busch-Sulzer 539 diesel engines, which produced a total 1,710 shp (1,280 kW), and had a Farrel-Birmingham single reduction gear alongside two propellers.

== Construction ==
Drake was laid down on 24 November 1943, at Portland, Oregon by the Willamette Iron and Steel Works, and launched on 12 August 1944. On 20 April 1945, her name was canceled, and she was re-designated as a degaussing vessel, YDG-11. The ship was placed in service on 15 August 1945, the day after the Japanese surrender.

== Service history ==
Due to the cessation of hostilities, YDG-11 saw little or no active service before being berthed with the Pacific Reserve Fleet at San Diego, California. She was retained on an inactive, in service, status until the winter of 1946 and 1947, when she was placed out of service, in reserve. On 1 November 1947 she was re-designated ADG-11. The ship remained inactive until July 1951, when she was again placed in service. Assigned to the Far East, ADG-11 was based at Yokosuka, Japan until sometime in 1954. After that, her home port was Sasebo, Japan. On 1 February 1955, she was renamed Ampere. The ship was placed out of service in February 1957. Her equipment was transferred to USS Surfbird, a minesweeping vessel which was redesignated a degaussing ship on 15 June 1957. She remained in reserve in the Far East until the summer of 1961, when the decision was made to dispose of her. Her name was struck from the Naval Register on 1 July 1961, and she was sold on 21 June 1962, to the Philippine President Lines of Manila. Her final disposition is unknown.

== Bibliography ==
- "Ampere". Dictionary of American Naval Fighting Ships. Naval History and Heritage Command. 16 June 2015.
- Radigan, Joseph M. "Ampere (ADG 11) ex-YDG-11". NavSource.
