= USS Surfbird =

Auk-class minesweeper built during World War II for the United States Navy.

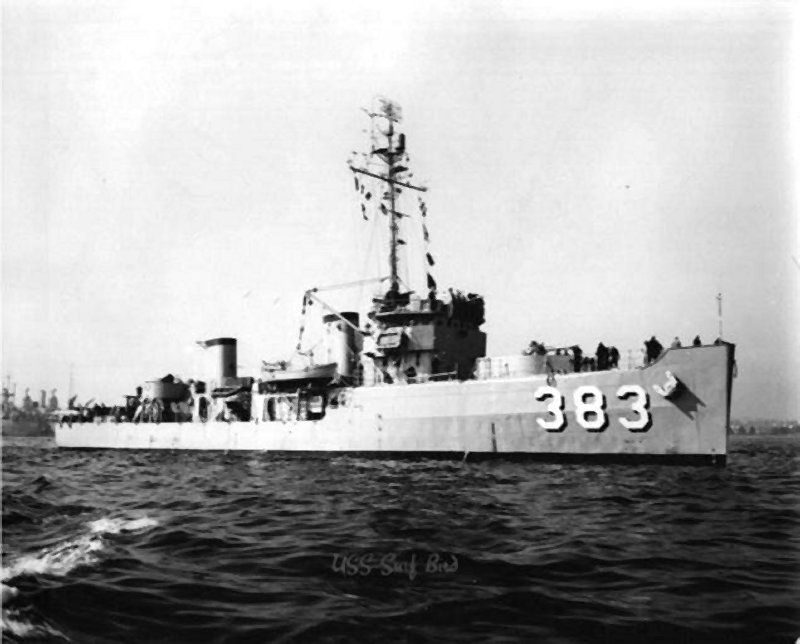
- USS Surfbird

History

United States
- Name: USS Surfbird
- Builder: American Ship Building Company
- Laid down: 15 February 1944
- Launched: 31 August 1944
- Commissioned: 25 November 1944
- Decommissioned: 18 December 1970
- Reclassified: MSF-383, February 1955; ADG-383, 15 June 1957
- Stricken: 21 February 1975
- Fate: Sold into commercial service, 5 December 1975

General characteristics
- Class & type: Auk-class minesweeper
- Displacement: 890 long tons (904 t)
- Length: 221 ft 1 in (67.39 m)
- Beam: 32 ft 2 in (9.80 m)
- Draft: 10 ft 9 in (3.28 m)
- Propulsion: 2 × General Motors 12-278A diesel electric drive engines, 3,532 shp (2,634 kW); Westinghouse single reduction gear; 2 shafts
- Speed: 18.1 knots (33.5 km/h; 20.8 mph)
- Complement: 117
- Armament: 1 × 3"/50 caliber gun; 2 × single 40 mm gun mounts; 6 × single 20 mm gun mounts; 1 × Hedgehog depth charge thrower; 4 × Depth charge projectiles (K-guns); 2 × Depth charge tracks

Service record
- Operations: World War II, Korean War, Vietnam War
- Awards: 3 battle stars (World War II); 2 battle stars (Korea); 8 battle stars (Vietnam)

USS Surfbird (AM-383) was an Auk-class minesweeper built during World War II for the United States Navy. She was the only U.S. Navy ship named for the surfbird.

Surfbird was laid down on 15 February 1944 by the American Ship Building Company, Lorain, Ohio; launched on 31 August 1944, sponsored by Mrs. F. W. Chambers; and commissioned on 25 November 1944.

== Service history ==
=== World War II, 1944–1946 ===
Surfbird departed Lorain on 26 November en route to Boston, Massachusetts via Montreal, Quebec and Halifax. She arrived at Boston on 15 December 1944 and held minesweeping trials. On 13 February 1945 the ship arrived at Little Creek, Virginia to begin her shakedown training. After a brief period in the Charleston Naval Shipyard for alterations, she sailed for the west coast. The Panama Canal was transited on 27 April, and Surfbird arrived at San Diego, California on 6 May. Two days later, she and Toucan (AM-387) sailed for Hawaii.

Surfbird arrived at Pearl Harbor and on 26 May departed there for Okinawa Retto, via Eniwetok, Guam and Ulithi. She arrived at Kerama Retto on 25 June and began daily sweeps of the "Skagway" area of the East China Sea. The minesweeper departed Okinawa on 5 September for North Saddle Island, at the entrance of the Yangtze River. She swept Bonham Strait and its approaches until 4 October and then swept the entrance to Yantai harbor, Shandong. Next was a two-day sweep of the approaches to Jinsen, Korea after which she got underway for Shanghai. The Yangtze River was entered on 16 October and, by the end of the month, she had swept 32 mines.

Surfbird sailed from Shanghai on 17 November for Sasebo Japan to be repaired. From 14–31 December 1945 she swept mines in Tachibana Wan, Kyūshū. She moved to Kure from Sasebo and remained there from 20–26 February 1946 when she sailed for the United States, via the Marianas, Marshall Islands, Johnston Island, and Pearl Harbor. The minesweeper arrived at San Diego on 14 April, and was decommissioned on 5 June 1946.

=== Korean War, 1952–1953 ===
Surfbird was recommissioned at San Diego on 12 March 1952 and operated from there until December. On 1 December she stood out to sea en route to the Far East. The minesweeper touched at Yokosuka, Japan on 28 December 1952 and departed on 1 January 1953 with units of Mine Division (MinDiv) 76 to begin sweep and blockade operations between Wonsan and Hungnam, Korea. These patrols were only broken by brief intervals of replenishment and upkeep at Sasebo. On 25 May Surfbird arrived at Inchon to make magnetic-acoustic sweeps of Yong Do and Cho Do. She returned to Sasebo on 6 June and sailed for the United States three days later.

=== 7th Fleet, 1953–1956 ===
Surfbird arrived at Long Beach, California on 3 July. Following an overhaul at Mare Island from 17 August to 28 October, she resumed local operations out of Long Beach. The ship departed the Far East again on 28 April 1954 and returned on 24 November 1954. In February 1955, her designation was changed from AM-383 to MSF-383. She trained along the California coast for the next year and on 1 March 1956 sailed for another tour with the 7th Fleet. When Surfbird was due for rotation on 9 August, she and Waxwing began a 13,000-mile cruise home through the South Pacific. They called at Manila in the Philippine Islands; Bali, Republic of Indonesia; Darwin, Australia; Port Moresby, New Guinea; and Pago Pago, Samoa. They then called at Pearl Harbor before returning to Long Beach on 9 October 1956.

=== Degaussing ship, 1957–1965 ===
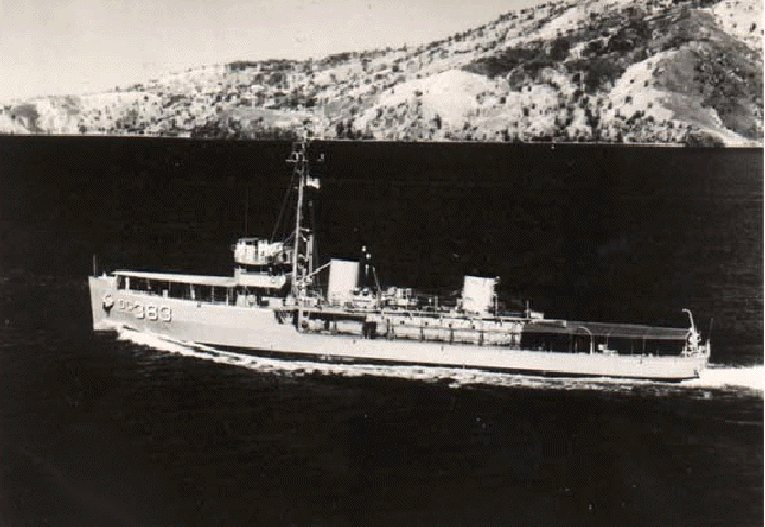
USS Surfbird reconfigured as a degaussing ship and redesignated as ADG-383.

On 22 January 1957 Surfbird sailed for Yokosuka (her new home port) to begin a new career. She arrived in Japan on 12 February and began receiving degaussing equipment from the USS Ampere (ADG-11). On 15 June she was redesignated from MSF-383 to a degaussing ship, ADG-383. Until April 1965, Surfbird operated from Sasebo, but her operations covered much of the western Pacific as she also degaussed ships of the allied sea services of Japan, Korea, the Republic of China, the Philippines, and South Vietnam.

=== Vietnam War, 1965–1970 ===
Surfbird stood out of Subic Bay on 11 April 1965 en route to Vietnam. Upon her arrival there, she was assigned patrol duty on "Operation Market Time" until returning to Sasebo on 7 May. Surfbird again performed "Market Time" patrols and special ranging service off the coast of South Vietnam from 2 to 22 August 1966, and from 17 September to 7 October 1966. She returned to Vietnam for operations during the following periods: 8 to 15 September and 10 to 14 November 1967; 17 June to 20 July 1968; 8 to 28 March; 16 August to 10 September; 2 to 26 October 1969; 4 January to 7 February; and 21 July to 3 August 1970.

Surfbird received three Battle Stars for service in World War II, two for Korean War service, and eight for service during the Vietnam War.

=== Decommissioning and subsequent career ===
On 5 August 1970 Surfbird was notified that she was to be inactivated. She departed Japan on 7 September and, after making port calls at Guam and Hawaii, arrived at the Inactivation Facility, Bremerton, Washington on 3 October. Surfbird was decommissioned on 18 December 1970 and attached to the Pacific Reserve Fleet, where she remained into February, 1975.

Surfbird was struck from the Naval Vessel Register on 21 February 1975; sold 5 December 1975 to the Pacific Northwest Salvage Company, Inc. of Seattle, Washington; sold again in December, 1975 to Brice Industries of Fairbanks, Alaska and renamed Helenka B. Helenka B was subsequently transferred to the Maritime Administration in 1976 for disposal and sold to Wel-Aska of Valdez, Alaska. She is still operating under that name, and was involved in the March, 1989 Exxon Valdez oil spill clean up.

The Surfbird is still floating, Her name is Helenka B and she is owned by Capt. Bruce Flanigan and is operated out of Homer, AK by Capt. Shea Robinson as a cargo supply ship. She has been shortened in length and bow doors added, 2 new main engines (Cats). She operates under the company name Alaskan Coastal Freight, LLC. The Surfbird was the 75th vessel, as well as the longest and heaviest, at 410 tons, pulled by the City of Kodiak's Travelift in June 2011.

== In popular culture ==
Surfbird appeared briefly in the 1954 film The Caine Mutiny as the fictitious minesweeper USS Jones.
