= USS Sarsi =

Tugboat of the United States Navy

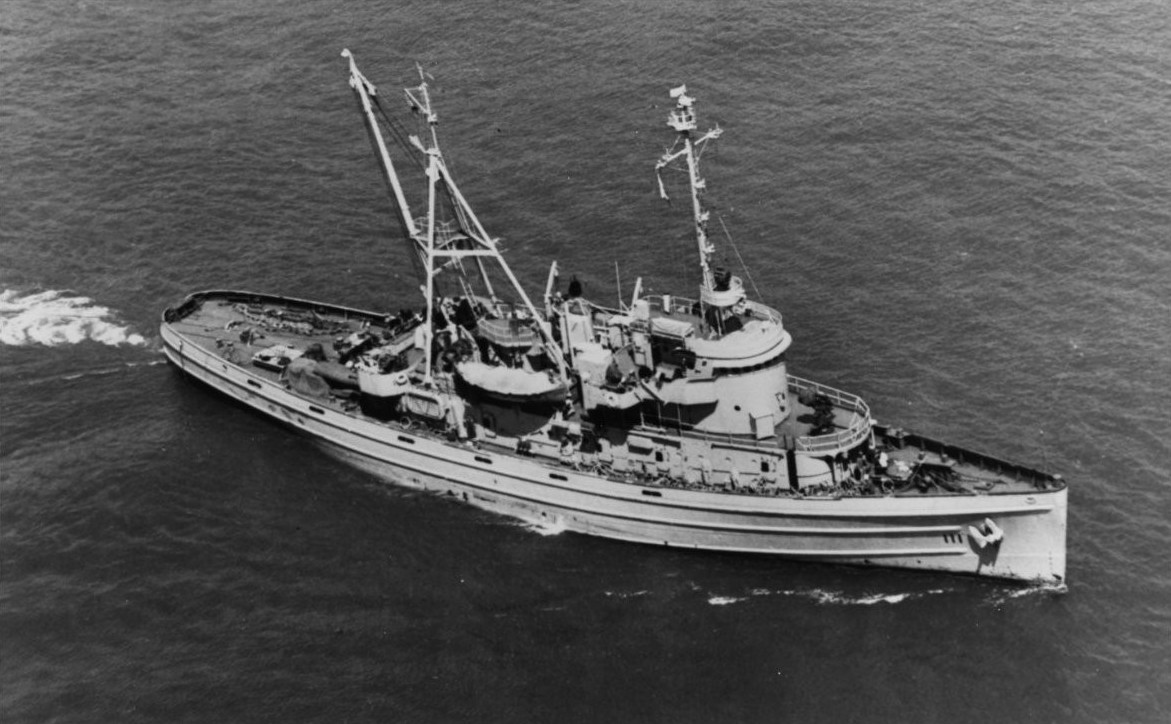
- Sarsi underway circa 1946

History

United States
- Name: USS Sarsi
- Namesake: A small Canadian plains tribe of the Athapascan family which hunted on the upper Saskatchewan River
- Builder: United Engineering and Dry Dock Company, Alameda, California
- Laid down: 25 January 1943
- Launched: 12 June 1943
- Sponsored by: Mrs. Robert E. Christy
- Commissioned: 24 June 1944 as Sarsi (AT-111)
- Decommissioned: 27 August 1952 (sank after striking a mine)
- Reclassified: ATF-111 on 15 May 1944
- Stricken: c. 1952
- Home port: Sasebo, Japan
- Honours and awards: two campaign stars for her service during the Korean War
- Fate: Sank after striking a drifting naval mine in a typhoon between Wonsan and Hungnam, 27 August 1952

General characteristics
- Type: Abnaki-class fleet ocean tug
- Tonnage: 1,240 tons
- Displacement: 1,589 tons
- Length: 205 ft (62 m)
- Beam: 38 ft 6 in (11.73 m)
- Draft: 15 ft 4 in (4.67 m)
- Propulsion: diesel-electric, four Alco diesel main engines driving four General Electric generators and three General Motors 3-268A auxiliary services engines, single screw
- Speed: 16.5 knots
- Complement: 85 officers and enlisted
- Armament: one single 3 in (76 mm) gun mount, two twin 40 mm gun mounts, two single 20 mm guns

USS Sarsi (AT-111/ATF-111) was an Abnaki-class fleet ocean tug commissioned in California in 1943. She served during World War II in North Pacific waters, and during the Korean War, she performed her towing services until she was sunk during Typhoon Karen in 1952 by a drifting naval mine off the coast of Korea.

== Constructed in California ==
Sarsi (AT-111) was laid down on 25 January 1943 by the United Engineering and Dry Dock Co., Alameda, California; launched on 12 June 1943; sponsored by Mrs. Robert E. Christy; redesignated ATF-111 on 15 May 1944; and commissioned on 24 June 1944.

== World War II service ==
Following shakedown training off southern California, Sarsi headed north to assume fleet tug duties in the 17th Naval District, headquartered at Kodiak (temporarily Adak) Alaska.

She arrived in the Aleutians on 19 August and, by the end of World War II, had completed 45 jobs in the Aleutians and, on four occasions, had supported units of the North Pacific Task Forces engaged in raids against the Kuriles and enemy shipping north of Hokkaido. During the latter, no casualties were inflicted on the ships of the attack forces.

In carrying out her varied missions-salvage, towing, personnel and cargo lifts-in the Aleutian chain, the tug operated from Unalaska, Kodiak, Umnak, Seguam, Adak, Tanaga, Amatignak, Amchitka, Shemya, and Attu.

== Post-war service ==
After the war, she remained on active duty and continued to provide tug and transportation services to ships and bases in the Aleutians. In the spring of 1947, she returned to southern California and commenced operations out of San Diego, California, which took her south along the west coast to Panama; west to the Hawaiian, Marshall, and Mariana Islands; and, five years later, north, back to the Aleutians. By that time, however, war had returned to the Pacific; and the United States was involved in the United Nations effort in Korea.

== Korean War service ==
On 24 March 1952, Sarsi, commanded by Lt. W. M. Howard, departed San Diego, California, and sailed west. On 18 April, she arrived at Sasebo, Japan. On the 20th, she took on ammunition; and, a week later, she continued on toward the embattled Korean peninsula. At the end of the month, she moored on the east side of Yodp, in the approaches to Wonsan harbor; and, as a unit of Task Group 92.2, the east coast Blockade and Escort Force, she performed towing, salvage, patrol, escort, buoy tender, and transportation duties.

On 19 May, she returned to Sasebo, whence she completed one rescue mission and several towing assignments to southeastern Korean and Japanese ports. In late June, she operated off the west coast of Korea. In July, she again operated between southeastern Korea and Kyūshū; and, on 19 August, she returned to the Wonsan area and resumed her varied duties there.

== Sunk in Typhoon Karen ==
On the 20th, typhoon “Karen” hit the coast. For the next week, Sarsi towed various vessels; carried light cargo and personnel; relocated buoys and conducted nighttime, close-inshore anti-mining and anti-junk patrols.

On the afternoon of the 27th, she refueled from Cimarron; and, at 1847, moved north to patrol along the edge of the mineswept waters between Wonsan and Hungnam. At 2200, all unnecessary lights were extinguished. She reached Hungnam without incident; but, as she turned to return to Wonsan, a drifting mine, probably cut loose by the typhoon, exploded against her hull. Damage control efforts proved futile, and Sarsi sank in twenty minutes.

Four men were killed. The remainder, including four wounded, spent the night in, or clinging to, life rafts, life preservers, and the ship's whale boat. The whale boat, kept pointed out to sea with lines to the rafts, prevented drifting onto the enemy held shore. Rescue ships – destroyer Boyd, and minesweepers Zeal and Competent—arrived in the morning; and carried the survivors to friendly territory for medical treatment and reassignment.

== Honors and awards ==
Sarsi earned two campaign stars for her service during the Korean War.
