= USS Ruddy =

Minesweeper of the United States Navy

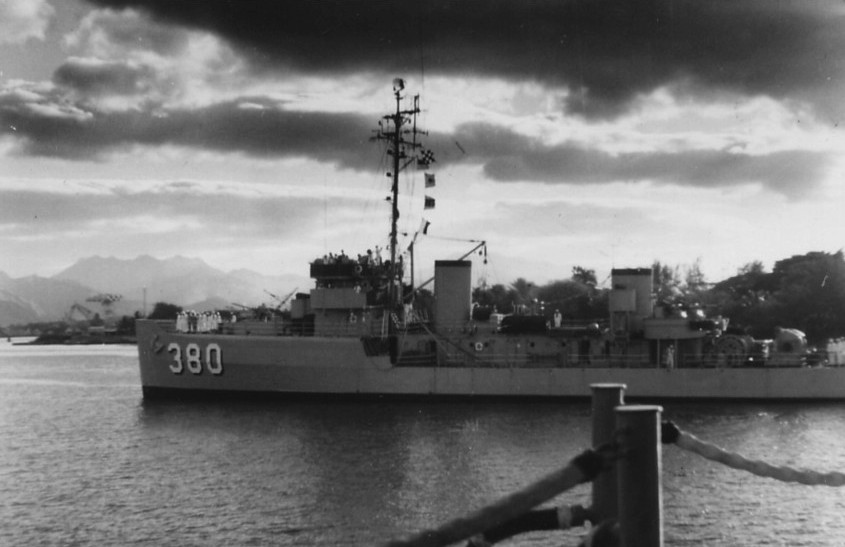
- USS Ruddy entering Pearl Harbor, 1955 in company with the USS Zeal

History

United States
- Name: USS Ruddy (AM-380)
- Laid down: 24 February 1944
- Launched: 29 October 1944
- Commissioned: 28 April 1945
- Reclassified: MSF-380, 7 February 1955
- Decommissioned: 31 August 1956
- Stricken: c. 1960
- Home port: Long Beach, California
- Fate: Transferred to Peru, 1 November 1960

History

Peru
- Name: BAP Gálvez
- Acquired: 1 November 1960
- Fate: Stricken 1981

General characteristics
- Class & type: Auk-class minesweeper
- Displacement: 890 tons
- Length: 221 ft 2 in (67.41 m)
- Beam: 32 ft 2 in (9.80 m)
- Draft: 11 ft (3.4 m)
- Propulsion: two 3,532shp General Motors 12-278A diesel electric drive engines, Westinghouse single reduction gear, two shafts.
- Speed: 18 knots
- Complement: 105
- Armament: one 3 in (76 mm) dual purpose gun mount, two single 40 mm gun mounts, six single 20 mm gun mounts, one depth charge thrower (Hedgehogs), four depth charge projectiles (k-guns), two depth charge tracks

USS Ruddy (AM-380) was an Auk-class minesweeper acquired by the U.S. Navy for the dangerous task of removing mines from minefields laid in the water to prevent ships from passing. She was the only U.S. Navy ship named for the North American ruddy duck.

== Launched in Chickasaw, Alabama in 1945 ==
Ruddy was laid down on 24 February 1944 by the Gulf Shipbuilding Corp., Chickasaw, Alabama; launched 29 October 1944; sponsored by Mrs. John Zerolis; and commissioned 28 April 1945.

== World War II-related operations ==
After commissioning, Ruddy completed her shakedown cruise in Chesapeake Bay and on 27 July 1945 departed Little Creek, Virginia, for Okinawa. Arriving at Buckner Bay on 27 September, she escorted the Miiilicoma (AO-73) to Sasebo, Japan, destroying two Japanese mines with rifle fire en route. During October, she returned to the Ryukyus; but, on the 26th, was back off Sasebo to commence sweeping operations in the "Klondike" area off that port. Detached on 8 November, she provided courier service; supervised YMS operations; and carried freight between Okinawa and Sasebo until the new year. In January 1946, she again conducted minesweeping operations.

On 17 February, Ruddy sailed for the Marshall Islands. At Bikini Atoll from 7 to 24 March, she supervised buoy-laying activities in preparation for Operation Crossroads, the July 1946 atomic tests; then continued on to the United States.

Reaching San Pedro, California, on 23 April, the minesweeper was decommissioned at San Diego, California, on 15 January 1947 and berthed with the Pacific Reserve Fleet.

== Korean War operations ==
Recommissioned on 12 March 1952,Ruddy joined Mine Division 72 and, after 11 months of mine warfare exercises and fleet amphibious operations, sailed from Long Beach, California, in February 1953 for the Korean combat zone. She arrived off Wonsan, North Korea, on 15 March and began operations as a unit of the U.N. Blockade and Escort Force. On the 16th, she transported prisoners of war to Yo Do, then returned to Wonsan, whence, for 6 weeks, she conducted inshore patrols.

Ruddy in Pacific Ocean swells, February 1955

Three weeks of voyage repairs at Yokosuka, Japan, followed. She then steamed for Inchon and patrol duty along the peninsula's western coast. In mid-July, Ruddy returned to Japan.

Fourteen days later, the truce went into effect; and, at the end of the month, the minesweeper was at Niigata, Japan, to participate in the Perry Expedition Centennial celebration. In mid-August, she returned to Korea for patrol duty off Cheju Do; and, on 4 September, she departed Sasebo for California, arriving at Long Beach, California, on the 27th.

For the next 16 months, the Ruddy engaged in type training and tactics along the California coast.

== Post-Korean War Far East tour ==
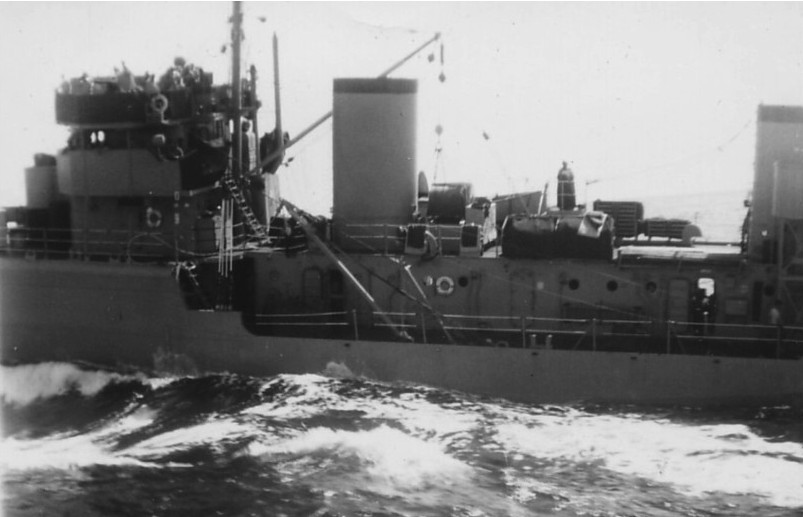
Ruddy in rough Pacific seas, February 1955

On 20 January 1955, accompanied by USS Zeal, MSF-131, Ruddy departed Pipeline Pier in Long Beach Harbor, and headed west for another tour in the Far East, stopping at Pearl Harbor in the Territory of Hawaii, and at Midway Islands for fuel and supplies.

Eighteen days later, while still in transit, she was redesignated MSF-380.

Ruddy and Zeal arrived at Sasebo, Japan, on 16 February and, until 10 August, Ruddy ranged from Japan to the Philippines in operations with the U.S. 7th Fleet. Accompanied by Zeal she returned to Pipeline Pier at Long Beach, California, on 5 September and resumed local operations.

== Decommissioning ==
With the new year, 1956, she began inactivation. Decommissioned at San Diego, California, on 31 August 1956, Ruddy was berthed with the Pacific Reserve Fleet.

== Peruvian service ==
On 1 November 1960 she was transferred, under the terms of the Military Assistance Program, to the government of Peru. The minesweeper served as the Gálvez in the Peruvian Navy until 1975 when she was transferred to the Peruvian Coast Guard. The minesweeper was retired in 1981.

== Awards and honors ==
Ruddy earned one battle star for post-World War II minesweeping operations and two for her service during the Korean War.

== See also ==
- Commander Mine Squadron SEVEN
