= USS Zeal =

Minesweeper of the United States Navy

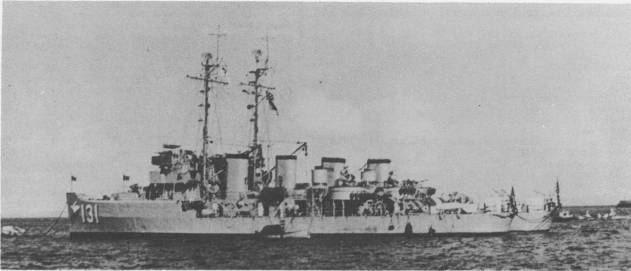
- The USS Zeal

History

United States
- Builder: Gulf Shipbuilding Company
- Laid down: 12 January 1942 at Chickasaw, Alabama
- Launched: 15 September 1942
- Sponsored by: sponsored by Mrs. John M. Hughes
- Commissioned: 9 July 1943
- Recommissioned: 19 December 1951
- Decommissioned: 6 July 1956
- Maiden voyage: Chickasaw, Alabama to New Orleans, Louisiana
- Reclassified: MSF-131 on 5 February 1955
- Stricken: 1 December 1966
- Homeport: Pipeline Pier, Long Beach, California
- Honors and awards: four battle stars during World War II and an additional four for her postwar minesweeping service. During the Korean War, she earned one battle star
- Fate: Sunk as a target on 9 January 1967
- Notes: Call sign: NBSX

General characteristics
- Class & type: Auk class minesweeper
- Displacement: 890 tons
- Length: 221 ft 2 in (67.41 m)
- Beam: 32 ft (9.8 m)
- Draught: 10 ft 9 in (3.28 m)
- Propulsion: 3,532shp General Motors 12-278 diesel electric engines, Farrel-Birmingham reduction gear, two shafts
- Speed: 18.1 knots
- Complement: 105
- Armament: one single 3 in (76 mm) dual purpose gun mount, two twin 40 mm gun mounts, two single 20 mm gun mounts, two depth charge tracks, five depth charge projectile
- Notes: crew members were awarded the "U.S.-R.O.C. Mutual Defense Commemorative Badge 1955-1979" and the "Honor Medal for 823 Bombardment" by the Republic of China.

USS Zeal (AM-131) was an Auk-class minesweeper that served in both World War II and during the Korean War. As a steel-hulled fleet minesweeper, she was assigned to support the fleet by removing enemy mines whose purpose was to impede the path of the U.S. Pacific Fleet.

== Laid down in Chickasaw, Alabama ==
Zeal was the first ship to be so named by the U.S. Navy and was laid down on 12 January 1942 by the Gulf Shipbuilding Company at Chickasaw, Alabama; launched on 15 September 1942, sponsored by Mrs. John M. Hughes; and commissioned on 9 July 1943.

== Sea trials ==
After a visit to New Orleans, Louisiana, for deperming, Zeal got underway late in July for shakedown training en route to Norfolk, Virginia. During that cruise, she conducted type training out of Key West, Florida. Between 9 and 30 August, post-shakedown availability at the Norfolk Navy Yard occupied her time.

== World War II support ==
=== Assigned to the Pacific Fleet ===
On 3 September, she received orders to proceed via Guantanamo Bay to the Panama Canal. Zeal arrived in Guantanamo Bay, Cuba on 8 September, and after loading supplies, got underway the following day for the Panama Canal Zone. She reached Coco Solo on 12 September and operated from there for the next month. On 12 October, she departed the Pacific terminus of the canal, bound for the southwestern Pacific. En route, the minesweeper made stops at the Galápagos Islands, Bora Bora, and Tutuila.

=== Escort duties ===
At Suva in the Fiji Islands, she received orders detaching her from her unit to serve as escort for the tanker SS Pacific Sun on a voyage from Suva to the New Hebrides Islands. She arrived at Espiritu Santo on 2 November and, three days later, departed on another convoy escort mission.

That mission set the pattern for her first 11 months in the western Pacific. Zeal escorted convoys between the islands of the southwestern Pacific which by that time were becoming increasingly more of a rear area. She also conducted antisubmarine patrols. For the most part, the Solomon Islands, the New Hebrides Islands, Fiji Islands, and the Marshall Islands constituted her zone of operations.

=== Amphibious support operations ===
In August 1944, however, Zeal began training for her first amphibious operation. Operating from Tulagi and Florida Island, she practiced minesweeping maneuvers, drilled at gunnery, and participated in rehearsal landings. On 8 September, she got underway with the other units of Mine Division 14 for the Palau Islands.

She arrived off Angaur in the Palaus on the morning of 15 September, and spent the next two days sweeping the approaches to the invasion beaches. The sweeps of Angaur, however, netted her no mines. On 17 September, she moved north to Kossol Roads and began screening the fleet anchorage located there against submarine attack.

Soon thereafter, Zeal received orders to proceed to Ulithi Atoll. She arrived there on 21 September and began running sweeps of the lagoon. Here, Zeal finally succeeded in fulfilling the mission for which she had originally been built, sweeping eight mines during the anchorage clearing operation.

She remained at Ulithi until 25 September at which time she departed the atoll in company with a convoy of LST's bound for Hollandia, New Guinea, where she made a brief stop on 29 September. From there, the ship continued on to Finschhafen and thence to Seeadler Harbor on Manus Island, where she arrived on 2 October.

=== Supporting Leyte Gulf operations ===
Zeal remained at Manus for eight days. On 10 October, she got underway with a convoy of minecraft, bound for Leyte Gulf. During the first few days of the transit, weather caused no problems; but, during the latter part, it steadily worsened. By the time Zeal arrived in Leyte Gulf, a storm approaching typhoon proportions had worked itself up. On 17 October, the minesweeper began the preinvasion sweep of the Leyte assault beaches on schedule. The storm, however, reached the typhoon stage at that point and forced her to retire from the area.

=== Under attack by enemy planes ===
The typhoon abated that evening; and, on the morning of 18 October, Zeal returned to resume her sweep. That day brought the warship her first contact with the Japanese. After she had cut a few moored mines, a "Val" dive-bomber flew over and dropped two bombs which missed nearby Velocity by about 200 yards. The Japanese plane made its attack and retired before any gun crews could man their battle stations.

Over the next few days, Zeal sighted several enemy planes; but the attack on the 18th remained her only close contact with the enemy until after she completed her minesweeping chores on 23 October and moved farther into the gulf near Dulag to join the fire support group there.

During her stay in the gulf, Zeal missed the Battle for Leyte Gulf but participated in some engagements with enemy land-based aircraft. One particularly intense air attack came on 25 October when Japanese planes were attacking the ships from almost every angle. A twin engine "Betty" bomber flew up the starboard side of the Zeal and drew the combined fire of her 3-inch and [[Oerlikon 20 mm cannon|20 mm]] batteries. A few seconds later, that intruder burst into flames and splashed into the sea. Zeal escaped the air raids with little or no damage, and her crew suffered only one casualty. On 28 October, she stood out of Leyte Gulf on her way back to Manus. The minesweeper entered Seeadler Harbor on 5 November.

=== Overhauled in the States ===
Nine days later, Zeal began the first leg of a voyage back to the United States. Steaming via Pearl Harbor, she arrived in Portland, Oregon, on 4 December. She was overhauled there at the Albina Shipards during December and the first two months of 1945. She completed repairs and departed Portland on 4 March, bound for refresher and minesweeping training along the coast of California. That employment occupied her for about a month.

=== Supporting Okinawa operations ===
On 2 April 1945, she departed the U.S. West Coast to return to the war in the western Pacific. After stops at Pearl Harbor and at Eniwetok Atoll, the minesweeper arrived at Kerama Retto in the Ryūkyūs on 21 May to join in the last campaign of World War II—the seven-week-old assault on Okinawa. During her tour of duty at Okinawa, Zeal served on the radar picket stations situated around the island and at some distance from which to provide early warning of air attack from enemy bases on Kyūshū and Formosa (now called Taiwan).

Though she witnessed a number of kamikaze and conventional air attacks on other ships, she suffered only one such scrape herself. On the night of 27 May, a Japanese float plane started a run on her, but her antiaircraft batteries quickly discouraged him.

=== End-of-war operations ===
Zeal remained at Okinawa until the beginning of July at which time she embarked upon some large-scale minesweeping operations. The first, designated Operation Juneau, was conducted in a 60-mile rectangle in the East China Sea. She returned to Okinawa late in July to conduct an availability in preparation for a similar operation, code-named "Skagway." On 15 August, while she was still undergoing repairs, Japan capitulated.

A week later, she departed Okinawa on her way to the "Skagway" area, but the mission was postponed because of the more pressing need of sweeping Japanese home waters for the occupation forces. By late August, she was on her way to northern Honshū, and on 6 September, reported for duty at Ominato Naval Base. She swept mines at that location until 19 October, at which time she received orders to head for Sasebo. She arrived in Sasebo on 24 October but departed two days later to participate in Operation Klondike – another major minesweep conducted in the East China Sea. "Klondike" lasted until 8 November, on which date she returned to Sasebo to begin repairs.

Zeal completed repairs on 25 November and departed Sasebo for another series of sweeps at various locations. These she conducted in the vicinity of Formosa and the Pescadores Islands, operating out of Kiirun, Formosa. At the conclusion of that assignment, she spent the holidays at Shanghai, China. She departed Shanghai on 3 January 1946 and arrived in Sasebo on 5 January. Ten days later, she began the first leg of her homeward voyage.

After stops at Eniwetok and Pearl Harbor, she entered San Diego, California on 9 February. Assigned to the San Diego Group, Pacific Reserve Fleet, Zeal was placed out of commission on 4 June 1946. She remained inactive until 19 December 1951 when she was recommissioned at San Diego.

== Korean War operations ==
=== Based out of Sasebo, Japan ===
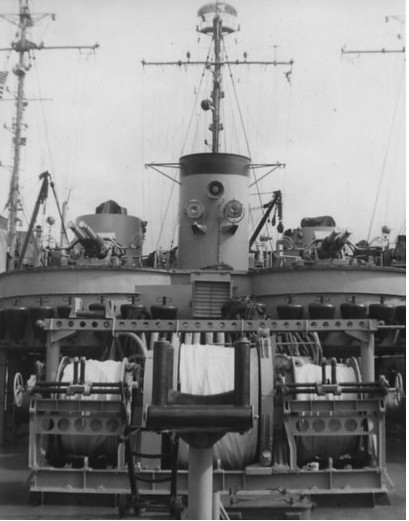
Rear view of ship, showing minesweep gear (1955).

The minesweeper remained on the west coast until 19 May 1952 when she got underway for the western Pacific. After a stop at Pearl Harbor late in May, Zeal continued her voyage west and arrived in Sasebo on 18 June. On the 27th, she departed Sasebo for Korean waters and minesweeping operations near Wonsan, Hungnam, and Chongjin.

During those operations, she came under fire of enemy shore batteries several times but sustained no damage. In August, she participated in the rescue of 26 of crewmen of the Sarsi after that tug had hit a mine and sunk. She served in the Korean combat zone until the fall of 1952. She departed Sasebo on 19 October and, after stops at Midway and Oahu, arrived in Long Beach, California, on 15 November.

For more than two years, Zeal conducted operations – almost exclusively training evolutions – out of Long Beach, San Diego, and other west coast ports.

== Post-Korean War service ==
On 21 January 1955, Zeal departed Long Beach, California, and embarked upon another deployment with the U.S. 7th Fleet. En route she was redesignated MSF-131. She reached Sasebo, Japan, on 15 February and, for the next six months, conducted operations off the western coast of Korea as well as in the Sea of Japan.

While in the Far East, the Zeal made port calls at Nagasaki, Moji, and Kobe, Japan, as well as at Hong Kong, China, and at Kaoshiung, Formosa. While in Kaoshiung from 29 July to 3 August 1955, she participated in exercises with the Formosan Navy, with some of her crew members serving aboard the Formosan vessels as observers.

Zeal departed Yokosuka, Japan on 10 August, and after stops at Midway Island and at Pearl Harbor, Territory of Hawaii, arrived in Long Beach, California, on 5 September.

== Decommissioning ==
Zeal conducted U.S. West Coast operations until she was decommissioned the following summer on 6 July 1956. She remained with the Pacific Reserve Fleet for just over a decade. Her name was struck from the Navy List on 1 December 1966, and her stripped hull was sunk as a target on 9 January 1967.

== Awards and honors ==
Zeal earned four battle stars during World War II, and an additional four battle stars for her postwar minesweeping service. During the Korean War, she earned one battle star.

For her service with the Formosan Navy in August 1955 crew members were awarded the "U.S.-R.O.K. Mutual Defense Commemorative Badge 1955-1979" and the "Honor Medal for 823 Bombardment."

== See also ==
- USS Ruddy (AM-380)
- Commander Mine Squadron SEVEN
