= USS Force (AM-445) =

Lost American mine-sweeping warship

Coordinates: 13.564°N 144.726°E

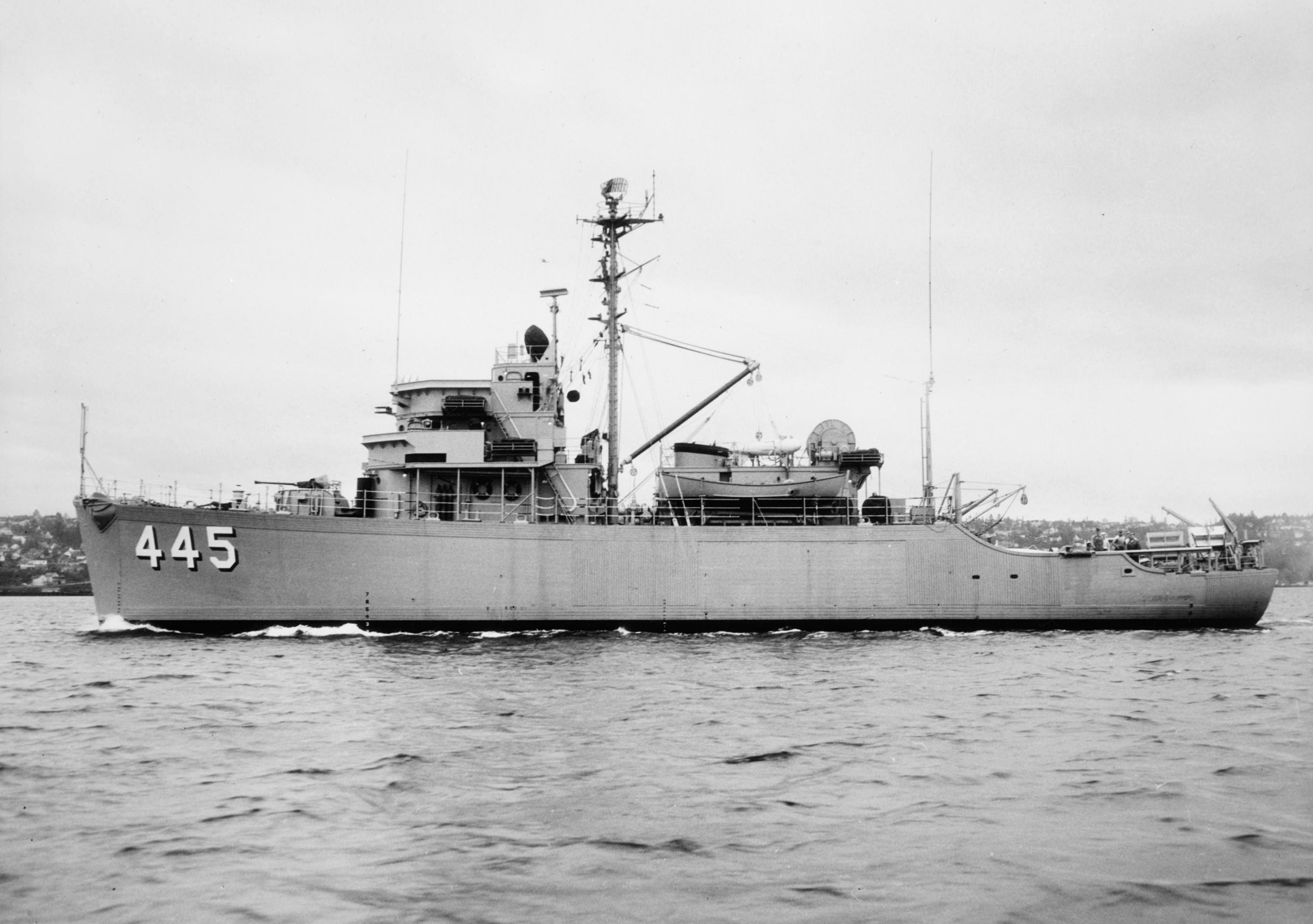
- USS Force (AM-445) on 14 December 1954

History

United States
- Name: USS Force
- Builder: J. M. Martinac Shipbuilding Corp., Tacoma, Washington
- Laid down: 26 August 1952
- Launched: 26 June 1953
- Commissioned: 4 January 1955, as AM-445
- Reclassified: MSO-445 (Ocean Minesweeper), 7 February 1955
- Fate: Lost by fire off Guam, 24 April 1973

General characteristics
- Class & type: Aggressive-class minesweeper
- Displacement: 620 long tons (630 t) full load
- Length: 172 ft (52 m)
- Beam: 35 ft (11 m)
- Draft: 10 ft (3 m)
- Propulsion: 4 × Packard ID1700 diesel engines (later replaced by 4 × aluminum block Waukesha diesel engines); 2 × shafts; 2 × controllable pitch propellers
- Speed: 16 knots (30 km/h; 18 mph)
- Complement: 74
- Armament: 1 × single 40 mm gun mount (later replaced by 1 × twin 20 mm gun mount); 2 × .50 cal (12.7 mm) twin Browning M2 machine guns

USS Force (AM-445) was an Agile-class minesweeper. She was laid down 26 August 1952 at J. M. Martinac Shipbuilding Corp., Tacoma, Washington, sponsored by Mrs. T. D. Wilson. She was launched 26 June 1953, commissioned 4 January 1955. She was redesignated an Ocean Minesweeper (MSO-445) on 7 February 1955.

Force was armed with one single 40 mm gun mount, two .50 cal. machine guns. Later, her bow gun was replaced with one twin 20 mm.

== Service history ==
Force reported to Mine Force, Pacific Fleet, at Long Beach, California, 20 January 1955, and sailed along the California coast in training exercises until 1 May 1956. She departed then for her first tour of duty in the Far East, during which she made a good will cruise of ports in the northern islands of Japan, as well as training with ships of the Chinese Nationalist Navy. Damaged by typhoons in August, she was repaired at Sasebo and Yokosuka, Japan, and returned to Long Beach 15 November.

Special operations took Force to the Panama Canal Zone between 30 August and 6 December 1957. She returned to Long Beach for exercises and preparations for her next deployment to the U.S. 7th Fleet, completed between 3 November 1958 and 1 June 1959. During this time, she again trained with the Chinese, Korean, and Thai navies.

On 2 November, she sailed with her division and Greer County (LST-799) for combined amphibious and minesweeping exercises out of Kodiak, Alaska; in these operations, her group was joined by ships of the Royal Canadian Navy. During these maneuvers, Force collected hydrographic data and served as home base for an explosive ordnance demolition team. She returned by way of Vancouver, British Columbia, and San Francisco, California, to Long Beach 16 December 1959. In February, 1960 Force was on station for missile nose cone recovery duty and during the balance of the year participated in exercise "Steeple Jack," a "Phiblex 60" exercise, and local operations.

"Force" served in the Vietnam War on coastal patrol during the 1960s (Operation "Market Time".)

On 24 April 1973 Force was lost off Guam, when a fuel leak was ignited by the No.1 Engine turbocharger and spread rapidly throughout the ship, despite the efforts of the crew. The ship was abandoned, and sank. There were no casualties, but one injury was reported.
