= USS Waxwing =

Minesweeper of the United States Navy

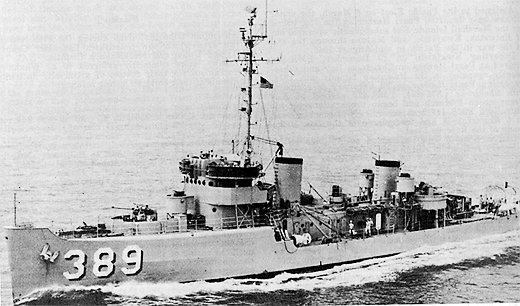

History

United States
- Name: USS Waxwing (AM-389)
- Namesake: waxwing
- Builder: American Ship Building Company, Lorain, Ohio
- Laid down: 24 May 1944
- Launched: 10 March 1945
- Commissioned: 6 August 1945
- Decommissioned: 12 May 1947
- Recommissioned: 19 March 1952
- Reclassified: MSF-389, 1955
- Decommissioned: 15 January 1957
- Fate: Transferred to Republic of China, 14 October 1965

History

Taiwan
- Name: ROCS Chu Yung (PCE-67) 居庸
- Acquired: 14 October 1965
- Decommissioned: 16 February 1998
- Fate: Sunk as fish reef (24-30.543N,121-51.516E)

General characteristics
- Class & type: Auk-class minesweeper
- Displacement: 890 long tons (904 t)
- Length: 221 ft 3 in (67.44 m)
- Beam: 32 ft (9.8 m)
- Draft: 10 ft 9 in (3.28 m)
- Speed: 18 knots (33 km/h; 21 mph)
- Complement: 100 officers and enlisted
- Armament: 1 × 3"/50 caliber gun; 2 × 40 mm guns; 2 × 20 mm guns; 2 × Depth charge tracks

USS Waxwing (AM-389) was an Auk-class minesweeper acquired by the United States Navy for the dangerous task of removing mines from minefields laid in the water to prevent ships from passing. She was the only U.S. Navy ship named for the waxwing, any of several American and Asiatic songbirds which are for the most part brown and are characterized by predominant crests and velvety plumage.

Waxwing was laid down on 24 May 1944 by the American Ship Building Company, Lorain, Ohio; launched on 10 March 1945; and commissioned on 6 August 1945 in Cleveland, OH.

== Service history ==
=== Post-World War II ===
Commissioned a little over a week before Japan capitulated, Waxwing was too late to participate in World War II. She was valuable to the Navy during the postwar period, particularly in clearing the minefields which had been planted in Far Eastern waters during the war. The ship set out on Lake Erie, transited the Welland Canal into Lake Ontario, and sailed down the Saint Lawrence River; stopped at Quebec; and then continued on to the Atlantic Ocean. The minesweeper was fitted out at Boston, Massachusetts, and then conducted shakedown in nearby waters. On 28 September, she arrived at the Norfolk, Virginia, operating area to prepare for service in the Pacific Fleet.

Waxwing transited the Panama Canal; and, on 2 January 1946, the minesweeper arrived in Pearl Harbor where she spent a month before heading on for Japan. She arrived at Sasebo, Japan, on 24 February and conducted operations through most of the year. During the period from May through July, Waxwing observed and supported Japanese sweeping operations codenamed "Guinea Pig." Waxwing sailed for home on 6 December and reached San Francisco, California, on Christmas Day 1946. She spent the next several months preparing for inactivation, was decommissioned on 12 May 1947, and placed in the Pacific Reserve Fleet.

=== Korean War ===
Following the outbreak of Korean War hostilities, the vessel was reactivated and recommissioned on 19 March 1952 at San Diego, California. From May to November, the ship conducted type training between Long Beach, California, and San Diego, California. On 1 December 1952, Waxwing sailed for the Far East. Her minesweeping duties took her to both coasts of Korea and were broken by periods of rest and upkeep in Sasebo and Yokosuka, Japan. These operations continued until 9 June 1953 when the ship sailed for home. She reached Long Beach, California, on 8 July 1953.

=== Pacific Fleet ===
From 20 August to 28 October 1953, Waxwing underwent an overhaul at the Mare Island Naval Shipyard followed by refresher training, type training, and independent ship exercises until 10 February 1954. The ship celebrated Washington's Birthday at San Francisco, California, then spent the remainder of February and half of March engaged in "Pactraex 54R", a full-scale invasion exercise conducted in the Santa Cruz Channel and the coastal area from Santa Cruz to Long Beach, California, which utilized nearly all types of ships and aircraft.

The ship then prepared for Far East deployment. On 18 April 1954, Waxwing departed Long Beach, bound for Sasebo, Japan. After reaching the Orient, she patrolled the Korean coasts. During August, Waxwing enjoyed a rest and recreation visit to Hong Kong. She then engaged in an air-sea rescue mission taking her 200 miles south of Japan where she aided in salvaging a downed United States Air Force plane and returned with six of its survivors on board. Waxwing completed her tour of duty in the Far East on 3 November 1954; departed Sasebo bound for home; and arrived at Long Beach on 24 November.

Shortly after returning, the minesweeper served as a salvage ship for divers examining the wreckage of an experimental jet plane that had crashed off Laguna Beach, California. Her work at Laguna won the ship a letter of commendation. In the latter half of March 1955, Waxwing took part in "Pactraex 55P", a full dress, combined Navy-Marine "invasion" at San Simeon, California. The ship then proceeded to San Diego and underwent three weeks of intensive training under simulated battle conditions followed by a visit to Astoria, Oregon, from 18 to 29 August for participation in the sesquicentennial celebration of the arrival of the Lewis and Clark Expedition at the mouth of the Columbia River. For the remainder of the year and through February 1956, Waxwing conducted local operations along the California coast. In 1955, Waxwing was re-designated as a fleet minesweeper, MSF-389.

On 1 March 1956, Waxwing set course for the western Pacific Ocean as part of the U.S. 7th Fleet force in Sasebo, Japan. After four months of operations and training in Japan, Korea, and Taiwan, the minesweeper began an extended cruise that touched many ports in the East Indies, Australia, and the South Pacific Ocean. She returned to Long Beach, California, on 9 October 1956 and prepared to become part of the "mothball" fleet at Astoria, Oregon.

== Decommissioning and transfer ==
On 15 January 1957, Waxwing arrived at Astoria and was placed in commission in reserve with inactivation scheduled to be completed by May 1957.

While laid up in reserve, Waxwing was modified to become an anti-submarine escort ship; and she was transferred to the Republic of China on 14 October 1965 and served the Republic of China Navy as Chu Yung (PCE-67) and decommissioned on 16 February 1998.

== See also ==
- Commander Mine Squadron SEVEN
