= USS Greer County =

1944 LST-542-class tank landing ship

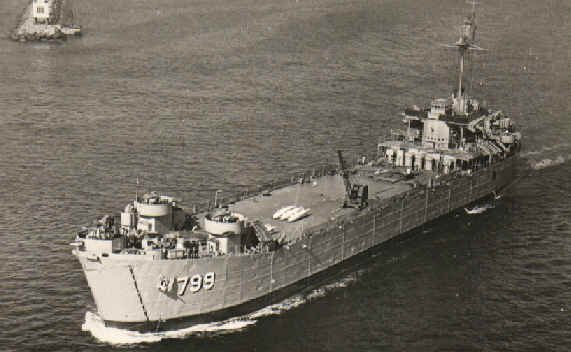
- USS Greer County (LST-799) at the outer breakwater, Long Beach, California c. 1955.

History

United States
- Name: USS LST-799
- Builder: Jeffersonville Boat & Machine Company, Jeffersonville, Indiana
- Laid down: 25 August 1944
- Launched: 3 October 1944
- Commissioned: 21 October 1944
- Decommissioned: 22 April 1946
- Recommissioned: 26 August 1950
- Decommissioned: 18 January 1960
- Renamed: USS Greer County (LST-799), 1 July 1955
- Stricken: 1 November 1960
- Honours and awards: 1 battle star (World War II); 9 battle stars, Navy Unit Commendation & Korean Presidential Unit Citation (Korea)
- Fate: Transferred to West Germany

West Germany
- Name: Bamberg (A-1403)
- Namesake: Bamberg
- Reclassified: N-122
- Fate: Sold to the Netherlands in 1970, fate unknown

General characteristics
- Class & type: LST-542-class tank landing ship
- Displacement: 1,780 long tons (1,809 t) light; 3,640 long tons (3,698 t) full
- Length: 328 ft (100 m)
- Beam: 50 ft (15 m)
- Draft: Unloaded : 2 ft 4 in (0.71 m) forward; 7 ft 6 in (2.29 m) aft; Loaded : 8 ft 2 in (2.49 m) forward; 14 ft 1 in (4.29 m) aft
- Propulsion: 2 × General Motors 12-567 diesel engines, two shafts, twin rudders
- Speed: 12 knots (22 km/h; 14 mph)
- Boats & landing craft carried: 2 or 6 LCVPs
- Troops: 140 officers and enlisted men
- Complement: 8-10 officers and 100-115 enlisted men
- Armament: 8 × 40 mm guns; 12 × 20 mm guns

USS Greer County (LST-799) was a LST-542-class tank landing ship (LST) built for the United States Navy during World War II. She was named for Greer County, Oklahoma on 1 July 1955, and the only U.S. Naval vessel to bear the name.

Originally laid down as LST-799 by the Jeffersonville Boat & Machine Company of Jeffersonville, Indiana on 25 August 1944; launched on 3 October, sponsored by Miss Mary R. Whalen; and commissioned at New Orleans, Louisiana on 21 October 1944.

== World War II ==
Following shakedown off Florida, LST-799 loaded construction equipment at Gulfport, Mississippi, and steamed on 29 November for the West Coast. Loading ammunition cargo at San Francisco, California, she departed on 13 February 1945, and arrived at Saipan on 24 March. Two days later she was en route to Okinawa, where the largest amphibious operation of the Pacific war was about to begin. Under the threat of enemy air raids, LST-799 approached the beaches of Okinawa on 2 April, one day after the initial landings. On 3 April LST-599 was hit by a kamikaze and a fire-rescue party from LST-799 assisted in extinguishing the blaze caused by the impact. The landing ship was on General Quarters consistently during the next month as the enemy made a futile effort to stop the accelerating American drive across the Pacific toward Japan. Departing Okinawa on 8 May, LST-799 sailed to Ulithi and for the rest of the war shuttled cargo among the American-held bases.

Following the end of World War II, she supported occupation forces in Japan and the Philippines until 22 April 1946 when she decommissioned at Japan.

== Korean War ==
Following the outbreak of war in Korea in the summer of 1950, LST-799 recommissioned at Yokosuka, Japan on 26 August 1950. On 5 September she departed with a cargo of ammunition and provisions, arriving at Pusan, Korea two days later. There she loaded a tank unit of the U.S. 5th Marines and sailed for the landings at Inchon, which turned the tide of the conflict. General MacArthur summed up the success of the 15 September assault: "The Navy and Marines have never shone more brightly than this morning." After the Inchon landings, LST-799 sailed for Wonsan, arriving there on 25 October.

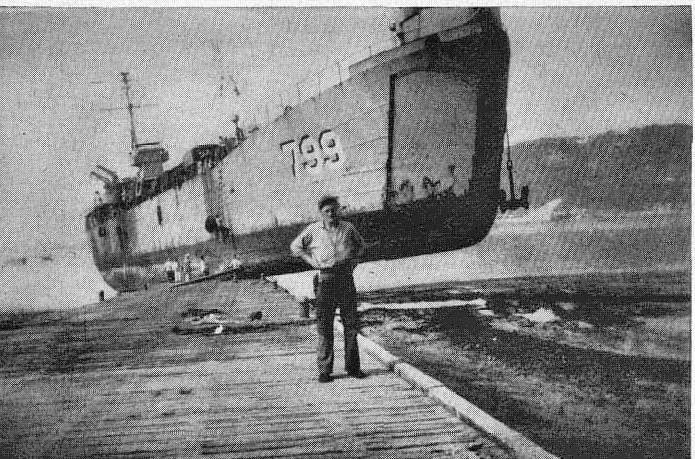
USS Greer County (LST-799) on the pier at Inchon, South Korea in 1950, the result of miscalculating the extreme ebb and flow of the tides in that port.

During December an overhaul was interrupted to participate in the evacuation of American and South Korean troops at Hungnam. On 24 December she embarked final covering elements of the U.S. 3rd Division, and sailed for Pusan arriving the 27th. In early 1951, she completed overhaul and was equipped with helicopter landing facilities. Assigned as a mine squadron flagship, she performed logistic support for minesweepers off the Korean east coast. She remained off Korea until September 1952; and, in addition to logistics, performed helicopter rescue operations, engaged in the coastal blockade, and participated in the Wonsan Harbor Control System. Following extended overhaul at Long Beach, California, LST-799 returned to the Western Pacific on 9 April 1953. She resumed duties out of Wonsan as a Mine Squadron flagship. After the armistice, she continued evacuation and training in the Far East, until sailing for the United States late in November 1953. From 1954 to 1956, LST-799 made two cruises to the Western Pacific. On 1 July 1955, she was named USS Greer County (LST-799). Upon return from her 1956 cruise, she became flagship of Mine Squadron 7 operating along the West Coast.

== Post-War ==
Greer County was decommissioned on 18 January 1960, struck from the Naval Vessel Register on 1 November 1960, and subsequently sold to the Federal Republic of Germany and renamed FGS Bamberg (A-1403).

At some point Bamberg was redesignated N-122 and work began to convert her into a minelayer, however work on this was only 60% complete when the ship was sold to the Netherlands in 1970. Her final fate is unknown.

LST-799 earned one battle star for World War II service and the Navy Unit Commendation, the Korean Presidential Unit Citation, and nine battle stars for the Korean War.
