= USS Firm (AM-444) =

Minesweeper of the United States Navy

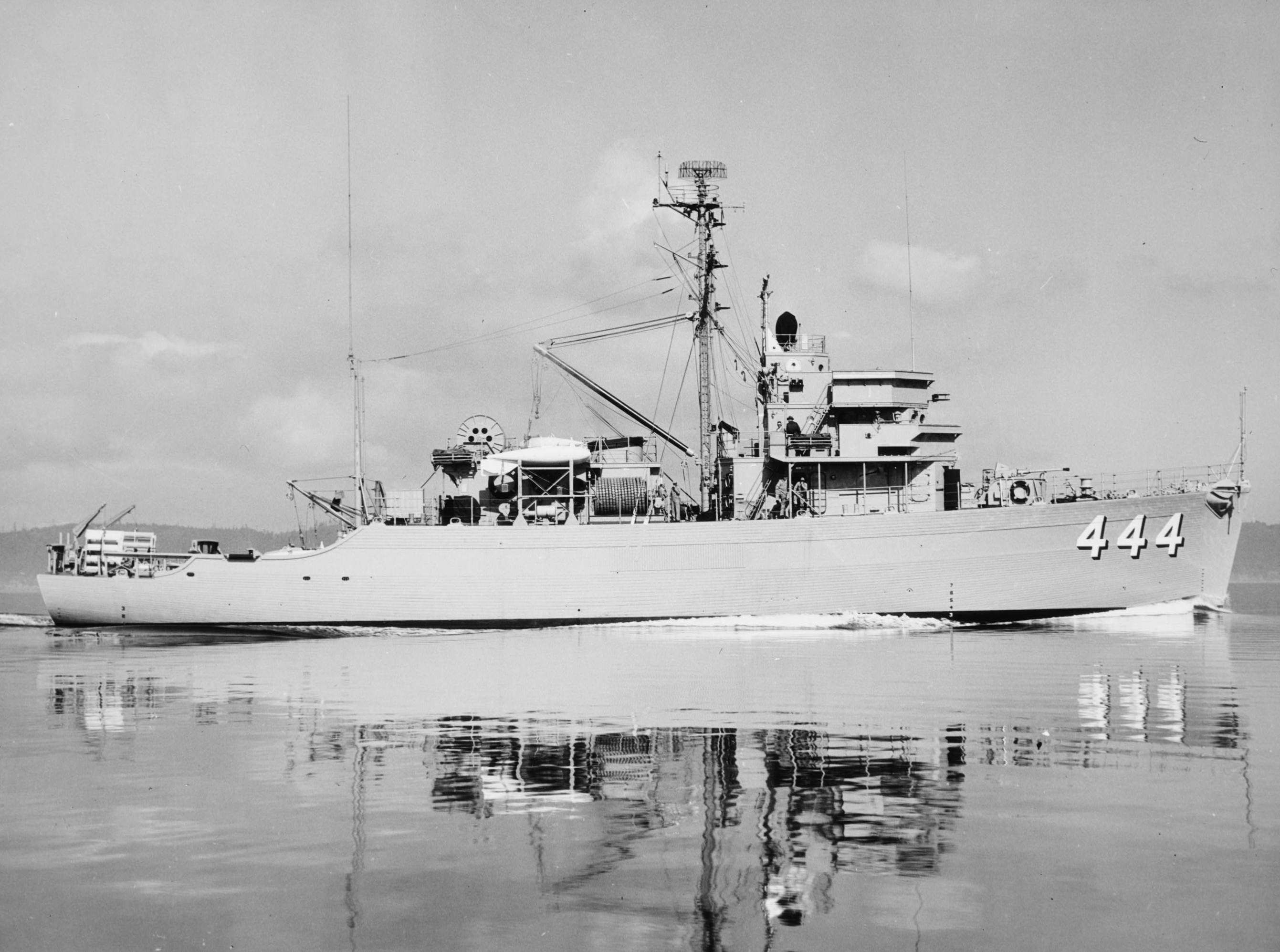
- USS Firm (AM-444) underway in August 1954

History

United States
- Name: USS Firm
- Builder: J. M. Martinac Shipbuilding Corp., Tacoma, Washington
- Laid down: 16 April 1952
- Launched: 15 April 1953
- Commissioned: 12 October 1954
- Decommissioned: 5 July 1972
- Reclassified: MSO-444, 7 February 1955
- Fate: Transferred to the Philippines, 17 July 1972
- Acquired: returned from Philippines, 1 July 1977
- Stricken: 1 July 1977
- Fate: Sold for scrapping, 8 July 1977

History

Philippines
- Name: BRP Davao del Sur (PM-92)
- Acquired: 17 July 1972
- Fate: Returned to U.S., 1 July 1977

General characteristics
- Class & type: Agile-class minesweeper
- Displacement: 620 long tons (630 t)
- Length: 172 ft (52 m)
- Beam: 36 ft (11 m)
- Draft: 10 ft (3.0 m)
- Speed: 10 knots (19 km/h; 12 mph)
- Complement: 74
- Armament: 1 × 40 mm gun 2 x .50 gun

USS Firm (AM-444/MSO-444) was an Agile-class minesweeper in the United States Navy.

Firm was launched 15 April 1953 by J. M. Martinac Shipbuilding Corp., Tacoma, Washington; sponsored by Mrs. Joseph S. Martinac; and commissioned 12 October 1954. She was reclassified MSO-444 on 7 February 1955.

== Service history ==
From her home post at Long Beach, California, headquarters for Mine Force, Pacific Fleet, Firm sailed for training and exercises along the west coast, interrupted during 1955 for her conversion to flagship for Mine Division 94. Between 1 March 1956 and 2 November 1956, and again between 3 November 1958 and 31 May 1959, she served in the Far East with the 7th Fleet, exercising with ships of the Korean, Chinese Nationalist, and Thai navies, as well as visiting a wide number of Oriental ports and taking part in fleet training schedules. Through 1962, Firm continued her west coast operations out of Long Beach.

Beginning in April 1965, USS Firm was assigned to Operation Market Time, a program instituted to curb the Communist infiltration of arms and other contraband into South Vietnam during the Vietnam War. As a member of Mine Division 72, MD-91 and MD-33, usually serving as flagship, Firm made five deployments to Vietnam over a seven-year period (until 1971), performing its duties with distinction and earning the Vietnam Service Medal, the Vietnam Campaign Medal, two Navy Meritorious Unit Commendations, and the Vietnam Cross of Gallantry.

Firm was decommissioned 5 July 1972. She was transferred to the Philippines as BRP Davao del Sur (PM-92) on 17 July 1972. Returned to United States custody on 1 July 1977, the ship was struck from the Naval Vessel Register the same day, and on 8 July sold for scrapping to Ming Hing and Co., Kowloon, Hong Kong.
