= USS Mulberry =

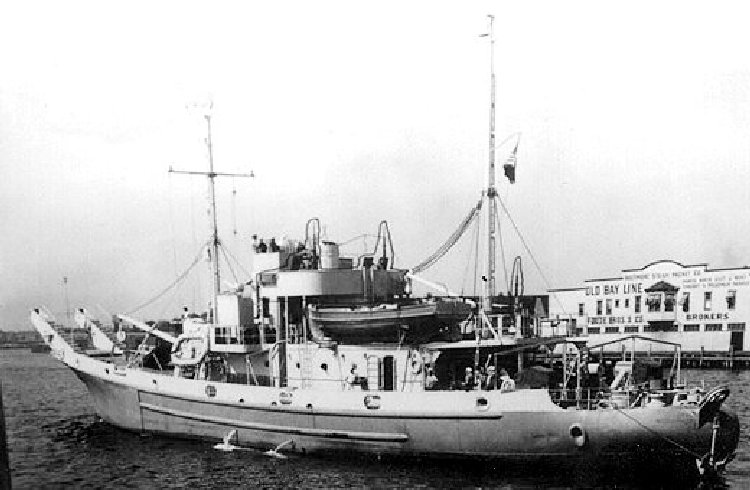

History

United States
- Name: USS Mulberry (YN-22)
- Namesake: mulberry
- Builder: American Shipbuilding Company, Cleveland, Ohio
- Laid down: 18 October 1940
- Launched: 26 March 1941
- Sponsored by: Mrs. W. H. Gerhauser
- In service: 1 November 1941 as Mulberry (YN-22) at Guantanamo Bay, Cuba
- Commissioned: 19 December 1942
- Reclassified: AN-27, 20 January 1944
- Decommissioned: 11 April 1960
- Home port: Guantanamo Bay, Cuba; Pearl Harbor, Hawaii; Sasebo, Japan; Long Beach, California
- Honours and awards: one battle star for Korean War Service
- Fate: transferred to Ecuadorian Navy, November 1965

History

Ecuador
- Name: BAE Orion (H-101)
- Acquired: November 1965
- Fate: Scrapped, 1980

General characteristics
- Class & type: Aloe-class-class net laying ship
- Displacement: 850 long tons (860 t)
- Length: 163 ft 2 in (49.73 m)
- Beam: 30 ft 6 in (9.30 m)
- Draft: 11 ft 8 in (3.56 m)
- Propulsion: Diesel- Electric, Two diesel engines with attached generators to drive twin electric motors for the single propeller
- Speed: 12.5 knots (23.2 km/h)
- Complement: 4 officers, 44 enlisted
- Armament: one single 3 in (76 mm) gun mount, three 20 mm guns, one y-gun

USS Mulberry (AN-27/YN-22) was an Aloe-class net laying ship built for the United States Navy during World War II. She saw service in that conflict and the Korean War, earning one battle star for service in the latter conflict. She was decommissioned in April 1960 and placed in reserve. In November 1965, she was transferred to the Ecuadorian Navy as BAE Orion (HI-91). She was scrapped in 1980.

== Career ==
Mulberry (AN 27) originally designated YN 22, was laid down 18 October 1940 by the American Shipbuilding Company, Cleveland, Ohio; launched 26 March 1941; sponsored by Mrs. W. H. Gerhauser; placed in service at Guantanamo Bay, Cuba, in the 10th Naval District; commissioned 19 December 1942 and was reclassified AN 27, effective 20 January 1944.

Following re-designation, Mulberry departed Guantanamo Bay and sailed to Adak, Alaska. Operating from Adak and Kodiak, Alaska, she engaged in net tending, carried cargo, and transported military personnel in Alaskan an Aleutian waters for the next 3 years.

She arrived San Francisco, California, 12 March 1947 for an overhaul, after which she proceeded to Tiburon, California, for training exercises. Assigned to Hawaii net laying ship duty, she engaged in harbor operations at Pearl Harbor from 7 June to January 1948. She resumed operations off the U.S. West Coast for the next 2 years, departing Bremerton, Washington, 8 July 1950 for duty in Japan.

For the next 5 years she engaged in net tending at Sasebo and Yokosuka Harbors. Between 29 May and 1 August 1953, she operated in the Korean ports of Pusan, Cheju Do, Ulsan, Wonsan, and Chinhae, aiding United Nations forces meeting the challenge of Communist aggression,

Mulberry arrived Long Beach, California, 23 December 1955, and continued operations from that port for the next 5 years. She decommissioned 11 April 1960, and was placed in the Pacific Reserve Fleet, berthed at San Diego, California. The Mulberry was transferred on loan to Ecuador in November 1965 under the Military Assistance Program where she served as Orion (HI-91); she was scrapped in 1980.

== Honors and awards ==
Mulberry received one battle star for her U.S. Korean War service.
