= USS Dominant (AM-431) =

Minesweeper of the United States Navy

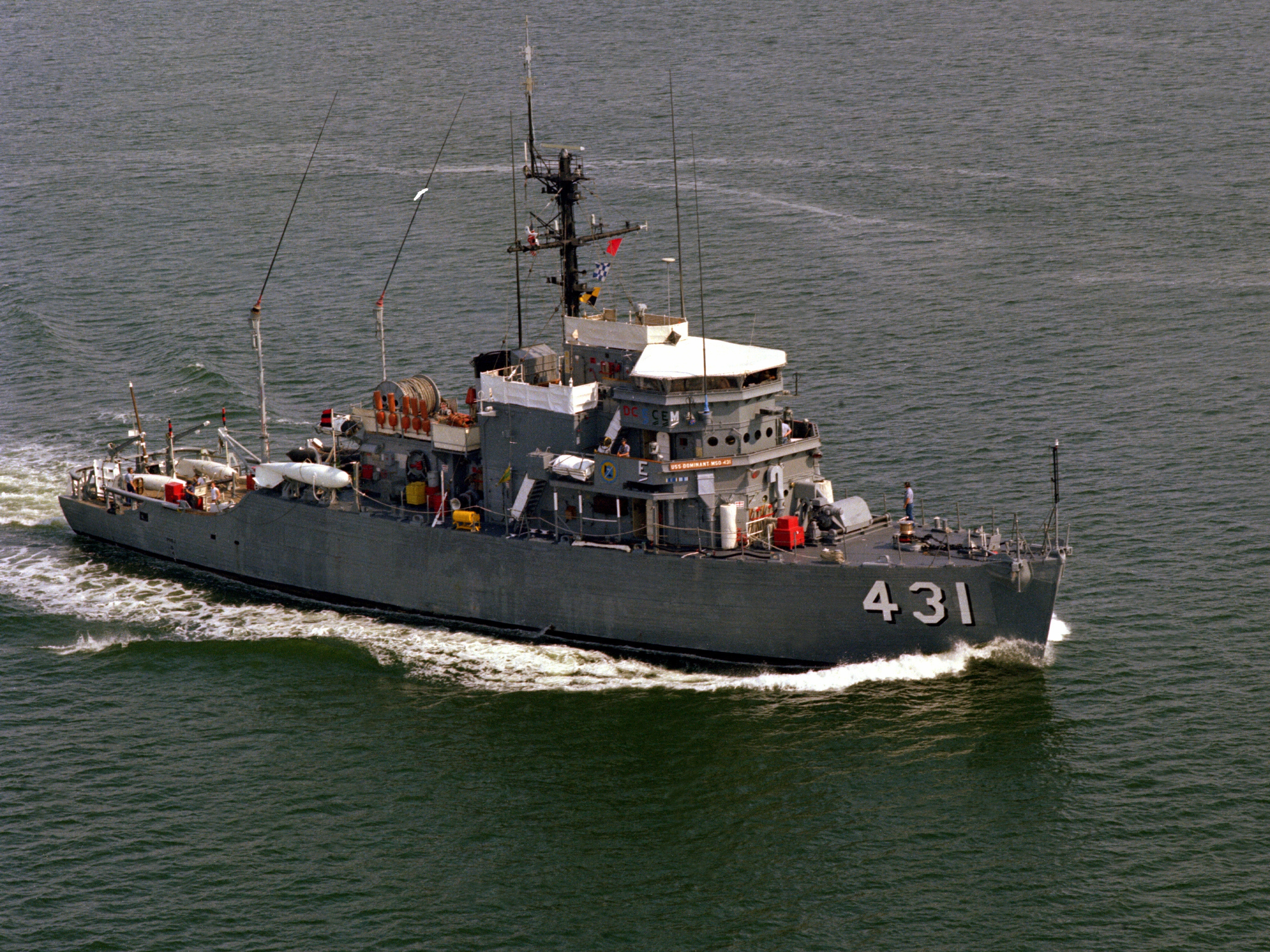
- USS Dominant in 1981

History

United States
- Name: USS Dominant
- Laid down: 23 April 1952
- Launched: 5 November 1953
- Commissioned: 8 November 1954
- Decommissioned: 1 October 1982
- Stricken: 1 October 1982
- Fate: Sold for scrap, 7 December 1983

General characteristics
- Displacement: 620 tons
- Length: 172 ft (52 m)
- Beam: 36 ft (11 m)
- Draught: 10 ft (3.0 m)
- Speed: 15 knots
- Complement: 74
- Armament: one 40 mm mount

USS Dominant (MSO-431) was an Agile-class minesweeper built for the United States Navy.

The second ship to be named Dominant by the U.S. Navy was launched as AM-431 on 5 November 1953 by C. Hiltebrant Dry Dock Co., Kingston, New York; sponsored by Mrs. Belle S. Hiltebrant; and commissioned on 8 November 1954. On 7 February 1955, the ship's hull classification was changed from "AM" for "minesweeper" to "MSO" for "minesweeper, ocean" during a mid-1950s hull reclassification of all U.S. Navy mine warfare vessels.

== European deployments ==
After shakedown training out of Naval Station Key West at Key West, Florida, during which time the ship's designation was changed to MSO-431, Dominant reported to her home port, Naval Base Charleston, South Carolina, on 10 November 1955 for duty with Mine Force, Atlantic. Assigned to Mine Division 43 (MINDIV 43), Dominant spent the next four years conducting deployments to Europe for operations and exercises with North Atlantic Treaty Organization (NATO) navies, providing services for Navy Mine Defense Laboratory Panama City, Florida, and supporting amphibious and other fleet exercises off the east coast and in the West Indies.

Dominant first deployed to Europe soon after arriving at NAVBASE Charleston (4 January – 11 June 1956) and followed that a Mediterranean deployment the next year (1 May – 2 October 1957), a northern European deployment that included a cruise to Danish and German ports in the Baltic Sea (12 May – 30 September 1958), and another Mediterranean deployment (27 April - 27 August 1959) before returning to her new home port at Naval Amphibious Base Little Creek, Virginia.

== Providing services for BUSHIPS ==
After her shift to the Norfolk, Virginia area, Dominant reported to Commander, Operational Test and Evaluation Force (COMOPTEVFOR), to provide towing, recovery and other services for Bureau of Ships (BUSHIPS) projects. These duties were again interspersed with deployments, including the West Indies (23 January – 4 May 1961, 30 October 1961 – 17 January 1962, 17 June – 25 September 1964 and 4 October – 16 December 1965), and the Mediterranean.

Dominant participated in the Cuban Missile Crisis of 22–26 October 1962. While attached to MINDIV 43, Dominant, along with minesweepers Dash, Direct, and Detector were assigned to the Caribbean to patrol the Windward Passage in search of and the potential boarding of Russian ships (12 February 1963; 7 February – July 16, 1965), as well as amphibious and other fleet operations off the coasts of South Carolina, Georgia, and Florida. Dominant also provided contingency services for the National Aeronautics and Space Administration (NASA) off Bermuda in April 1963.

Dominant continued the same pattern of activities through the end of the decade, with one more Mediterranean deployment (3 November 1966 – 14 May 1967), an exercise with Colombian and Venezuelan naval forces (9 May- 10 June 1968), an additional NATO exercise off Halifax, Nova Scotia (Exercise Silver Tower, 9–27 September 1968), and an extensive modernization period at the Old Dominion Shipyard in Norfolk, Virginia starting in early 1969.

Following her refit, Dominant was homeported again at NAVBASE Charleston along with her entire squadron (the other "D" named ships of Agile class minesweepers). From Charleston, they departed for another European cruise. Port hopping via Halifax, Nova Scotia and St. John's, Newfoundland for topping off with fuel, fresh water and other stores, she and her squadron sailed unescorted to Campbelltown, Scotland. Dominant and her sister ships carried insufficient fuel in their tanks for the crossing, so a 2,500 gallon fuel bladder was installed on each ship's fantail. The squadron arrived in Scotland with fuel to spare, which was reported to have made U.S. Naval history; an MSO crossing the Atlantic unescorted. The cruise continued to Denmark where the squadron was engaged in Operation Love Song, a NATO exercise and then on to Germany, Holland, Belgium, France, Spain and into the Mediterranean. The squadron continued into the Mediterranean for several months with a maintenance stop in Naples, Italy. The squadron recrossed the Atlantic, sailing from the Straits of Gibraltar to NAVBASE Charleston in company with a destroyer tender which had completed her assignment in Naples. Dominant and the other "D" squadron minesweepers arrived at NAVBASE Charleston in early spring of 1971 and it was rumored that Dominant and her sister ships were to be taken out of service.

== Assigned as Naval Reserve training ship and home port shift to St. Petersburg, Florida ==
After the minesweeper shifted to the newly reorganized Mine Division 23 (MINDIV 23) in April 1971, Dominant changed status to become a U.S. Naval Reserve Training (NRT) ship on 1 July 1971, joining Mine Division 12 (MINDIV 12) with three other minesweepers that same day. Her designation was later changed to a Naval Reserve Force (NRF) ship.

As an NRF ship, Dominant also changed home port to St. Petersburg, Florida on 20 August 1971, utilizing waterfront pierside facilities at Naval Reserve Center St. Petersburg. Re-manned with a composite crew of 2/3 active duty Regular Navy and Training and Administration of the Reserve (TAR) personnel and 1/3 part time Selected Reserve (SELRES) personnel, Dominant began training her complement of Naval Reserve crews underway one weekend a month and for two or more weeks of annual training underway each year. Although Naval Reserve training duties generally kept Dominant in Florida waters, she occasionally sailed to NAVSTA Key West or Naval Station Mayport in Florida, NAVBASE Charleston in South Carolina or Naval Station Norfolk, Virginia for overhaul or minesweeping exercises. Dominant also periodically conducted search and rescue sweeps for crashed military and civilian fixed-wing aircraft and helicopters, primarily in the Gulf of Mexico.

== Home port shifts to Perth Amboy, New Jersey and Virginia Beach, Virginia ==
On 1 July 1977, Dominant shifted home port again to Perth Amboy, New Jersey, where her crew conducted a cross-deck transfer with the minesweeper USS Exultant (MSO-441). Dominant operated out of pier facilities at Naval Reserve Center Perth Amboy for the next four years. In 1981, Dominant shifted home ports again, returning to one of her earlier home ports, NAVPHIBASE Little Creek, Virginia, again training local Naval Reserve crews and periodically conducting exercises along the Atlantic coast ranging from Rhode Island to South Carolina. During one cruise in June 1979, Dominant assisted the stricken civilian yacht, That Boat, south of Shinnecock Inlet, Long Island, providing aid to the sinking vessel until U.S. Coast Guard assets arrived on the scene.

== Encounter with a Cuban gunboat ==
Her next significant deployment took place in early June 1980, when Dominant sailed to the Straits of Florida, whose waters were flooded with Cuban refugees during the mass migration known as the Mariel boatlift. During her week-long operations in the Straits of Florida (5 – 11 June 1980), Dominant rescued refugees from several over-crowded and sinking small craft. At one point the minesweeper was challenged by a Cuban Revolutionary Navy gunboat, which demanded the return of a specific refugee, but Dominant refused the demand.

== Decommissioning ==
Dominant made one more West Indies deployment (2 June – 20 July 1982) before commencing deactivation procedures. Dominant decommissioned at NAVBASE Charleston on 1 October 1982 and was struck from the Navy List the same day. She was then sold for scrap to Wayne Hobbs of Huntington Beach, California, on 7 December 1983.
