= Agile-class minesweeper =

US type of minesweeper

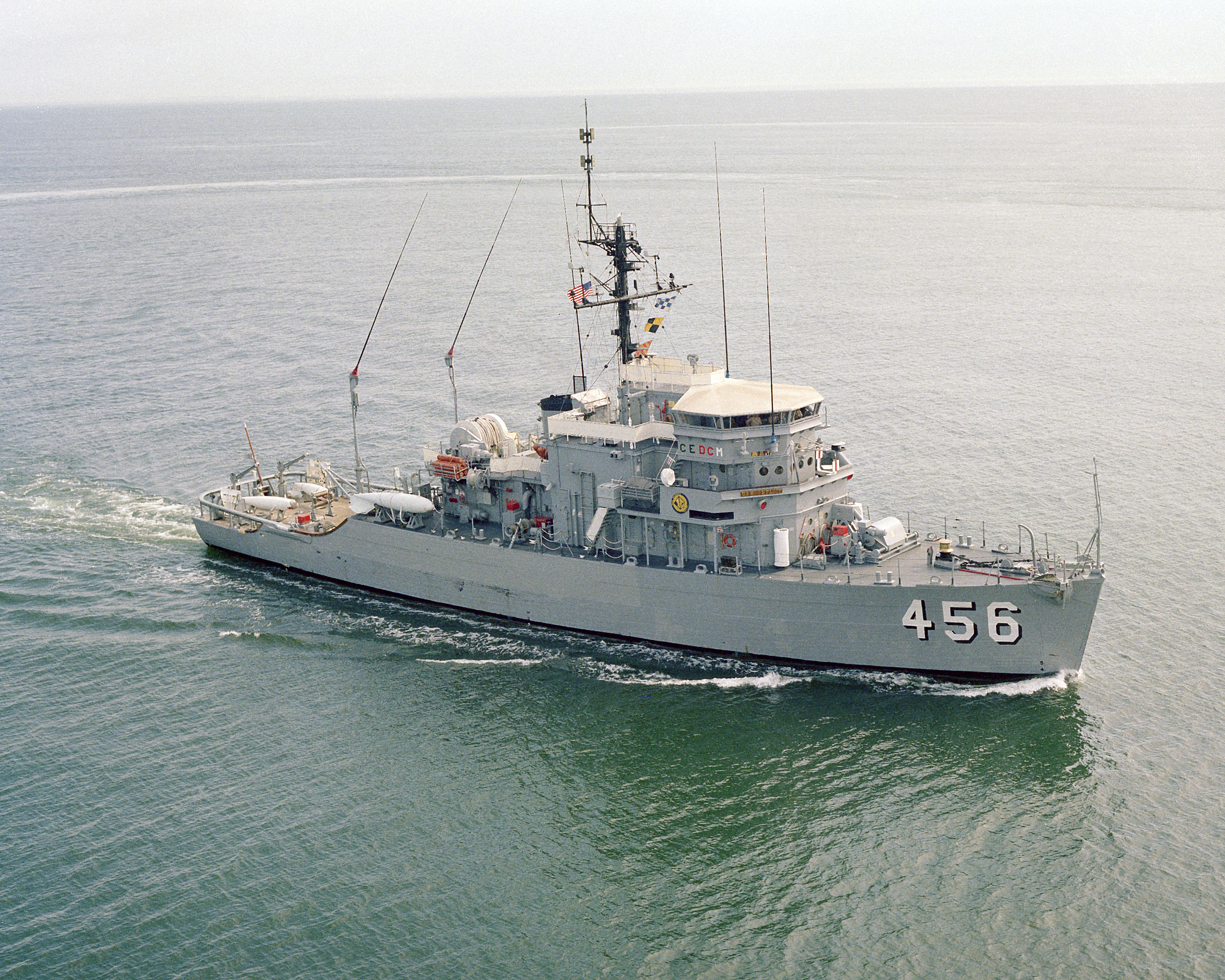
- USS Inflict (MSO-456)

Class overview
- Operators: United States Navy; French Navy; Italian Navy; Belgian Navy; Royal Norwegian Navy; Philippine Navy; Portuguese Navy; Republic of China Navy; Spanish Navy; Royal Netherlands Navy
- Preceded by: Acme class; Hawk class
- Subclasses: ships built for FMS
- Cost: US$9 million (1955) (equivalent to US$82.01 million in 2024) per unit
- Built: 1951–1957
- In service: 1953–2025
- Completed: 93
- Canceled: 1
- Preserved: 2

General characteristics
- Type: Minesweeper
- Displacement: 853 tons (full load)
- Length: 172 ft (52 m)
- Beam: 35 ft (11 m)
- Draft: 10 ft (3.0 m)
- Propulsion: 4 × Packard ID1700 diesel engines, 2,280 bhp (1,700 kW); 2 × shafts; 2 × controllable pitch propellers
- Speed: 14 knots (26 km/h)
- Complement: 7 officers, 70 enlisted
- Sensors & processing systems: AN/UQS-1 mine hunting sonar
- Armament: 1 Bofors 40 mm gun; 2 × .50 cal (12.7 mm) twin machine guns

The Agile-class minesweepers are a class of US-built ocean-going minesweepers. 58 ships were built for the United States Navy, 35 ships were built for the allied NATO navies of Belgium, France, Italy, the Netherlands, Norway and Portugal. Thirteen ships were later transferred to Belgium, Spain, Taiwan, the Philippines and Uruguay.

There is some confusion on how to name this class. The class is often described as the Aggressive class, as USS Aggressive (MSO-422) was the first ship to be commissioned. Sometimes four ships are a Dash-class subclass, although all ships are of the same design.

== Design ==
As a result of experiences during the Korean War, the United States Navy undertook a large scale construction of a new series of minesweepers. In contrast to the steel-hulled minesweepers built before, the Agile-class minesweepers were built mostly of wood with bronze and stainless steel fittings and engines to minimize their magnetic signature. The ships were equipped with the UQS-1 mine-locating sonar and were capable of sweeping moored, bottom contact, magnetic and acoustic mines.

== Modernization ==
Although it was planned to modernize all U.S. Navy ship of this class, only 19 ships were modernized starting with Fiscal Year 1968. The modernization cost between 700,000 and $1,500,000 per ship and should enable them to operate for another ten years. The ships received new aluminum block Waukesha diesel engines, and the superstructure was enlarged aft. The UQS-1 sonar was replaced with SQQ-14. Two PAP-104 cable-guided undersea tools were added. Also, two 40 hp zodiacs were carried for the purpose of mooring the new sonar reflectors. Also, a team of mine clearance divers was added. Additional space on the forecastle was needed for installation of the SQQ-14 cabling so the 40 mm Bofors bow gun was replaced with a mount for a twin 20 mm Mk 68 gun.

On July 1, 2025, the last Agile-class minesweeper, ROCS Yung Yang retired from Taiwan Navy service.

== Construction and disposition ==
Ship Name	Hull No.	Builder	Commission– Decommission	Fate	Link
Agile	421	Luders Marine Construction Co. of Stamford, Connecticut	1956–1972	Sold for scrap 1980	
Aggressive	422	Luders Marine Construction Co. of Stamford, Connecticut	1953–1971	Sold for scrap 1980	
Avenge	423	Luders Marine Construction Co. of Stamford, Connecticut	1954-1970	Destroyed by fire, sold for scrapping 1969	
Bold	424	Norfolk Naval Shipyard	1953-1971	Sold for scrap 1981	
Bulwark	425	Norfolk Naval Shipyard	1953-1971	Sold for scrap 1980	
Conflict	426	Fulton Shipyard, Antioch, California	1954-1973	Sold for scrap 1973	
Constant	427	Fulton Shipyard, Antioch, California	1954-1992	Sold for scrap 2001	
Dash	428	Astoria Marine Construction, Astoria, Oregon	1953-1982	Sold for scrap 1984	
Detector	429	Astoria Marine Construction, Astoria, Oregon	1953-1982	Sold for scrap 1984	
Direct	430	Hiltebrant Dry Dock Co., Kingston, New York	1954-1982	Sold for scrap 1984	
Dominant	431	Hiltebrant Dry Dock Co., Kingston, New York	1954-1982	Sold for scrap 1984	
Dynamic	432	Colberg Boat Works, Stockton, California	1953-1971; 1971-1998	1971 to Spain as Guadalete (M41) 1971, decommissioned 1998	
Engage	433	Colberg Boat Works, Stockton, California	1953-1991	Scrapped 2002	
Embattle	434	Colberg Boat Works, Stockton, California	1954-1972	Sold to be scrapped 1976, privately held until scrapped by the USACE in 1993.	
Endurance	435	J. M. Martinac Shipbuilding Corp., Tacoma, Washington	1954-1972	Sold for scrap 1973	
Energy	436	J. M. Martinac Shipbuilding Corp., Tacoma, Washington	1954-1972; 1972-1977	1972 to the Philippines as BRP Davao del Norte (PM-91); Sold for scrap 1977	
Enhance	437	Martinolich Shipbuilding Co., San Diego, California	1955-1991	Sold for scrap 2000	
Esteem	438	Martinolich Shipbuilding Co., San Diego, California	1955-1991	Sold for scrap 2000	
Excel	439	Higgins Corp., New Orleans, Louisiana	1955-1992	Sold for scrap 2000	
Exploit	440	Higgins Corp., New Orleans, Louisiana	1954-1993	Sold for scrap 2002	
Exultant	441	Higgins Corp., New Orleans, Louisiana	1954-1993	Sold for scrap 2002	
Fearless	442	Higgins Corp., New Orleans, Louisiana	1954-1990	Sold for scrap 1992	
Fidelity	443	Higgins Corp., New Orleans, Louisiana	1955-1989	Sold for scrap 1990	
Firm	444	J. M. Martinac Shipbuilding Corp., Tacoma, Washington	1954-1972; 1972-1977	1972 to the Philippines as BRP Davao del Sur (PM-92), scrapped 1977	
Force	445	J. M. Martinac Shipbuilding Corp., Tacoma, Washington	1955-1973	Sunk after a fire	
Fortify	446	Seattle Shipbuilding and Drydocking Co., Seattle, Washington	1954-1992	Scrapped 2002	
Guide	447	Seattle Shipbuilding and Drydocking Co., Seattle, Washington	1955-1972	Sold for scrap 1973	
Illusive	448	Martinolich Shipbuilding Co., San Diego, California	1953-1990	Sold for scrap 1993	
Impervious	449	Martinolich Shipbuilding Co., San Diego, California	1954-1991	Scrapped 2002	
Berneval	450	Bellingham Shipyards Co., Bellingham, Washington	1954-1987	Built for France, scrapped	
Bir Hacheim	451	Bellingham Shipyards Co., Bellingham, Washington	1954-1970; 1970-1979	Built for France, transferred to Uruguay in 1970 and renamed Maldanado (MS 33), scrapped 1979	
Garigliano	452	Bellingham Shipyards Co., Bellingham, Washington	1954-1988	Built for France, struck 1988	
Alençon	453	Bellingham Shipyards Co., Bellingham, Washington	1954-1983	Built for France, struck 1983	
Dompaire	454	Bellingham Shipyards Co., Bellingham, Washington	1954-1983	Built for France, struck 1983	
Implicit	455	Wilmington Boat Works Inc., Wilmington, California	1954-1994	1994 to Taiwan as Yung Yang (MSO-1306)	
Inflict	456	Wilmington Boat Works Inc., Wilmington, California	1954-1990	Sold for scrap 1992	
Loyalty	457	Wilmington Boat Works Inc., Wilmington, California	1954-1972	Sold for scrap 1973	
Lucid	458	Higgins Corp., New Orleans, Louisiana	1955-1970	Sold for civilian use 1976; Currently being restored by the Stockton Maritime Museum as a museum ship	
Nimble	459	Higgins Corp., New Orleans, Louisiana	1955-1970	Sold for scrap 1981	
Notable	460	Higgins Corp., New Orleans, Louisiana	1955-1970	Sold for scrap 1971	
Observer	461	Higgins Corp., New Orleans, Louisiana	1955-1972	Sold for scrap 1979	
Pinnacle	462	Higgins Corp., New Orleans, Louisiana	1955-1970	Sold for scrap 1978	
Pivot	463	Wilmington Boat Works Inc., Wilmington, California	1954-1971; 1974-1999	1974 to Spain as Guadalmedina (M42), scrapped 1999	
Pluck	464	Wilmington Boat Works Inc., Wilmington, California	1954-1990	Sold for scrap 1992	
Prestige	465	Wilmington Boat Works Inc., Wilmington, California	1954-1958	Grounded and sunk, 1958 in the Naruto Strait	
Prime	466	Wilmington Boat Works Inc., Wilmington, California	1954-1970	Sold for scrap 1976	
Reaper	467	Wilmington Boat Works Inc., Wilmington, California	1954-1972	Sold for scrap 1976	
Rival	468	Luders Marine Construction Co. of Stamford, Connecticut	1954-1970	Sold for scrap 1971	
Sagacity	469	Luders Marine Construction Co. of Stamford, Connecticut	1955-1970	Grounded at Charleston, sold for scrap 1970.	
Salute	470	Luders Marine Construction Co. of Stamford, Connecticut	1955-1970	Sold for scrap 1971	
Skill	471	Luders Marine Construction Co. of Stamford, Connecticut	1950-1970	Sold for scrap 1979	
Valor	472	Burger Boat Company, Manitowoc, Wisconsin	1954-1970	Sold for scrap 1971	
Vigor	473	Burger Boat Company, Manitowoc, Wisconsin	1954-1972; 1972-1999	1972 to Spain as Guadiana (M44), scrapped 1999.	
Vital	474	Burger Boat Company, Manitowoc, Wisconsin	1955-1972	Sold for scrap 1979	
Mytho	475	Bellingham Shipyards Co., Bellingham, Washington	1955-1988	Built for France, scrapped 1989	
Cantho	476	Bellingham Shipyards Co., Bellingham, Washington	1955-1987	Built for France, struck 1987	
Vinh Long	477	Bellingham Shipyards Co., Bellingham, Washington	1955-1988	Built for France, scrapped 1992	
São Jorge	478	Bellingham Shipyards Co., Bellingham, Washington	1955-1973	Built for Portugal, scrapped 1973	
Pico	479	Bellingham Shipyards Co., Bellingham, Washington	1955-1974	Built for Portugal; transferred to Belgium for spare parts, burned out in 1997, scrapped in 2011	
Onversaagd	480	Astoria Marine Construction, Astoria, Oregon	1955-1979	Built for the Netherlands, reclassified A854 in 1965, scrapped 1979	
Onbevreesd	481	Astoria Marine Construction, Astoria, Oregon	1955-1988	Built for the Netherlands, reclassified A855 in 1965, scrapped 1989	
Onvervaard	482	Astoria Marine Construction, Astoria, Oregon	1955-1984	Built for the Netherlands, reclassified A858 in 1965, scrapped 1984	
Onverschrokken	483	Peterson Builders, Sturgeon Bay, Wisconsin	1955-1987	Built for the Netherlands, converted to torpedo retriever Mercuur (A856) in 1973, decommissioned 1987 and preserved as museum ship in Vlissingen	
Onvermoeid	484	Peterson Builders, Sturgeon Bay, Wisconsin	1955-1974	Built for the Netherlands, reclassified A857 in 1965, scrapped 1975	
Onverdroten	485	Peterson Builders, Sturgeon Bay, Wisconsin	1955-1984	Built for the Netherlands, reclassified A859 in 1965, scrapped 1985	
Graciosa	486	Burger Boat Company, Manitowoc, Wisconsin	1955-1973	Built for Portugal, scrapped 1973	
Corvo	487	Burger Boat Company, Manitowoc, Wisconsin	1955-1973	Built for Portugal, scrapped 1973	
Conquest	488	J. M. Martinac Shipbuilding Corp., Tacoma, Washington	1955-1994; 1994-2020	1994 to Taiwan as Yung Tzu (MSO-1307)	
Gallant	489	J. M. Martinac Shipbuilding Corp., Tacoma, Washington	1955-1994; 1994-2013	1994 to Taiwan as Yung Ku (MSO-1308)	
Leader	490	J. M. Martinac Shipbuilding Corp., Tacoma, Washington	1955-1991	Sold for scrap 1994	
Persistent	491	J. M. Martinac Shipbuilding Corp., Tacoma, Washington	1956-1971; 1971-2000	1971 to Spain as Guadalquivir (M43), scrapped	
Pledge	492	J. M. Martinac Shipbuilding Corp., Tacoma, Washington	1956-1994; 1994-	1994 to Taiwan Yung Teh (MSO-1309)	
Stalwart	493	Broward Marine Inc, Fort Lauderdale, Florida	1956-1966	Caught fire pier side at San Juan, Puerto Rico, sunk 1966. Later raised and sunk as an artificial reef.	
Sturdy	494	Broward Marine Inc, Fort Lauderdale, Florida	1957-1971	Sold for scrap 1978	
Swerve	495	Broward Marine Inc, Fort Lauderdale, Florida	1957-1971	Sold for scrap 1978	
Venture	496	Broward Marine Inc, Fort Lauderdale, Florida	1958-1971	Sold for scrap 1978	
MSO-497	497	Cancelled			
Lågen	498	Bellingham Shipyards Co., Bellingham, Washington	1955-1966; 1966-1996	Built for Norway; transferred to Belgium in 1966 as Dufour (M 903), scrapped 2007	
Namsen	499	Bellingham Shipyards Co., Bellingham, Washington	1955-1966; 1966-1993	Built for Norway; transferred to Belgium in 1966 as De Brouwer (M 904), scrapped 2007	
Berlaimont	500	Bellingham Shipyards Co., Bellingham, Washington	1956-1986	Built for France, scrapped 1986	
Origny	501	Bellingham Shipyards Co., Bellingham, Washington	1956-1983	Built for France, converted to oceanographic research ship in 1962, reclassified A640 in 1974, struck 1985	
Autun	502	Bellingham Shipyards Co., Bellingham, Washington	1956-1985	Built for France, scrapped 1985	
Artevelde	503	Tacoma Boatbuilding Company, Tacoma, Washington	1956-1985	Built for Belgium, scrapped 1985	
Breydel	504	Tacoma Boatbuilding Company, Tacoma, Washington	1956-1993	Built for Belgium, scrapped 2006	
Baccarat	505	Tacoma Boatbuilding Company, Tacoma, Washington	1956-1993	Built for France, struck 1993	
Storione	506	Martinolich Shipbuilding Co., San Diego, California	1956-1997	Built for Italy, struck 1997	
Salmone	506	Martinolich Shipbuilding Co., San Diego, California	1956-1996	Built for Italy, struck 1996	
Narvik	512	Peterson Builders, Sturgeon Bay, Wisconsin	1956-1988	Built for France, reclassified A769 in 1976, struck 1989	
Ouistreham	513	Peterson Builders, Sturgeon Bay, Wisconsin	1956-1994	Built for France, struck 1994	
Colmar	514	Peterson Builders, Sturgeon Bay, Wisconsin	1956-1976	Built for France, scrapped 1985	
Georges Truffaut	515	Tampa Marine Co., Tampa, Florida	1956-2000	Built for Belgium, scrapped 2007	
F. Bovesse	516	Tampa Marine Co., Tampa, Florida	1956-1993	Built for Belgium, scrapped 2004	
Sgombro	517	Tampa Marine Co., Tampa, Florida	1957-2000	Built for Italy, reclassified P5432 in 1990, decommissioned 2000	
Squalo	518	Tampa Marine Co., Tampa, Florida	1957-2000	Built for Italy, reclassified P5433 in 1990, decommissioned 2000	

== See also ==
Equivalent minesweepers of the same era

- Dokkum class
- Vanya class
- Democrația class
- Ton class
- Kasado class
