= USS Swerve (MSO-495) =

U.S. Navy minesweeping ship

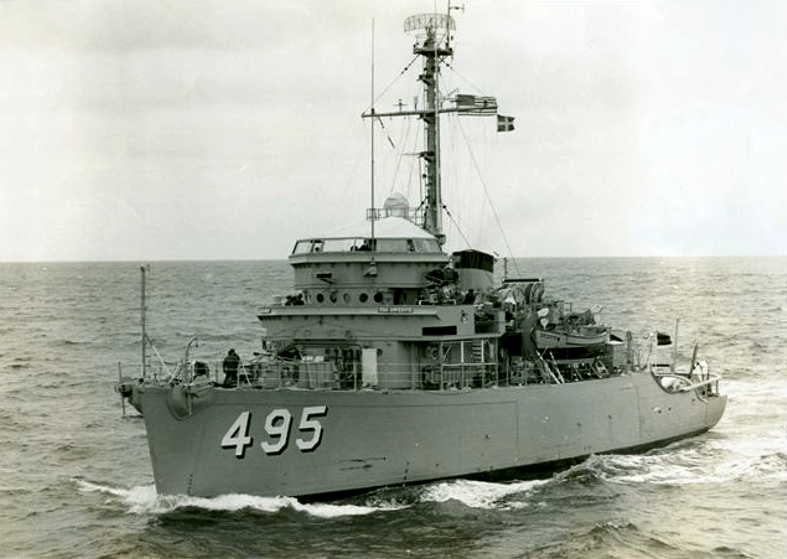

History

United States
- Name: USS Swerve
- Builder: Broward Marine Inc., Fort Lauderdale, Florida
- Laid down: 20 December 1954, as AM-495
- Launched: 1 November 1955
- Commissioned: 27 July 1957
- Decommissioned: 1 July 1971
- Reclassified: MSO-495 (Ocean Minesweeper), 7 February 1955
- Fate: Sold for scrapping, 1 February 1978

General characteristics
- Class & type: Aggressive-class minesweeper
- Displacement: 630 long tons (640 t) light; 755 long tons (767 t) full load
- Length: 172 ft (52 m)
- Beam: 36 ft (11 m)
- Draft: 10 ft (3 m)
- Propulsion: 4 × Packard ID1700 diesel engines; 2 × shafts; 2 × controllable pitch propellers
- Speed: 15 knots (28 km/h; 17 mph)
- Complement: 6 officers, 74 enlisted
- Armament: 1 × single 40 mm gun mount (later replaced by 1 × twin 20 mm gun mount); 2 × .50 cal (12.7 mm) twin Browning M2 machine guns

USS Swerve (MSO-495) was an Agile-class minesweeper acquired by the U.S. Navy for the task of removing mines that had been placed in the water to prevent the safe passage of ships.

Swerve was the second ship to be so named by the U.S. Navy. It was laid down on 20 December 1954 by Broward Marine Inc., Fort Lauderdale, Florida as AM-495; redesignated as MSO-495 on 7 February 1955; launched on 1 November 1955; sponsored by Mrs. F. A. Denison; and commissioned on 27 July 1957.

== East Coast operations ==
Swerve was assigned a home port at Charleston, South Carolina, and, after her shakedown, participated in local exercises and operations until January 1959 when she deployed to the Mediterranean for duty with the U.S. 6th Fleet. Her first cruise in the Mediterranean ended in June. She then participated in two minesweeping exercises which took her to Savannah, Georgia, and Nassau, Bahamas. From January to June 1960, she participated in various exercises and then, for a three-month period, operated an underwater camera for the Service Force from New York to Boston, Massachusetts and St. John's, Newfoundland.

== Another Mediterranean cruise ==
Swerve began an overhaul in October 1960 that lasted until February 1961. After refresher training, she participated in minesweeping operations with units of the Royal Canadian Navy before making a midshipman cruise to the Caribbean. She returned to Charleston and began making preparations for another tour with the U.S. 6th Fleet in the fall. The minesweeper stood out of Charleston, on 11 September 1961, and entered the Mediterranean two weeks later for a tour that ended on 24 March 1962. In May, Swerve participated in Project Mercury as a recovery unit for America's second orbital space shot. The remainder of the year was spent in local operations and in overhaul.

== Central American good will tour ==
Swerve sailed to Panama City, Florida, on 29 January 1963 and assisted the Mine Defense Laboratory during February and March. She and her division then deployed to the Caribbean from 2 June to 18 October. On 4 November, Swerve and USS Sturdy (MSO-494) got underway on a good-will tour to Central America. The two ships called at ports in Panama, Costa Rica, Nicaragua, and Guatemala before returning to Charleston on 8 December 1963.

Swerve conducted operations along the coast with Mine Division 44 until 24 August 1964 when it sailed for Naval Station Argentia, Newfoundland on a five-week cruise. The minesweeper spent the remainder of the year at Charleston for an overhaul and leave. In March 1965, she served as a recovery unit for Project Gemini 3 off Florida's Cape Kennedy.

Swerve was deployed to the 6th Fleet from 15 June to 8 November 1965. On 29 March, she deployed to the Caribbean. On 1 July, Swerve was assigned the task of finding and recovering a practice weapon that was lost off Vieques, Puerto Rico. After 51 days of searching, with the aid of the minisubmarine Asherah, the device was found and recovered. The ship returned to Charleston and resumed operations along the Atlantic seaboard from Halifax to the Dominican Republic for the next five years.

== Decommissioning ==
In September 1970 it was decided that Swerve would be decommissioned. Pre-inactivation was begun at Mayport, Florida, on 1 October; and, on 20 January 1971, she was placed in a caretaker status. Swerve was decommissioned on 1 July 1971 and assigned to the Atlantic Reserve Fleet. She was sold for scrap on 1 February 1978 by the Defense Reutilization and Marketing Service.
