= USS Vigor (AM-473) =

Minesweeper of the United States Navy

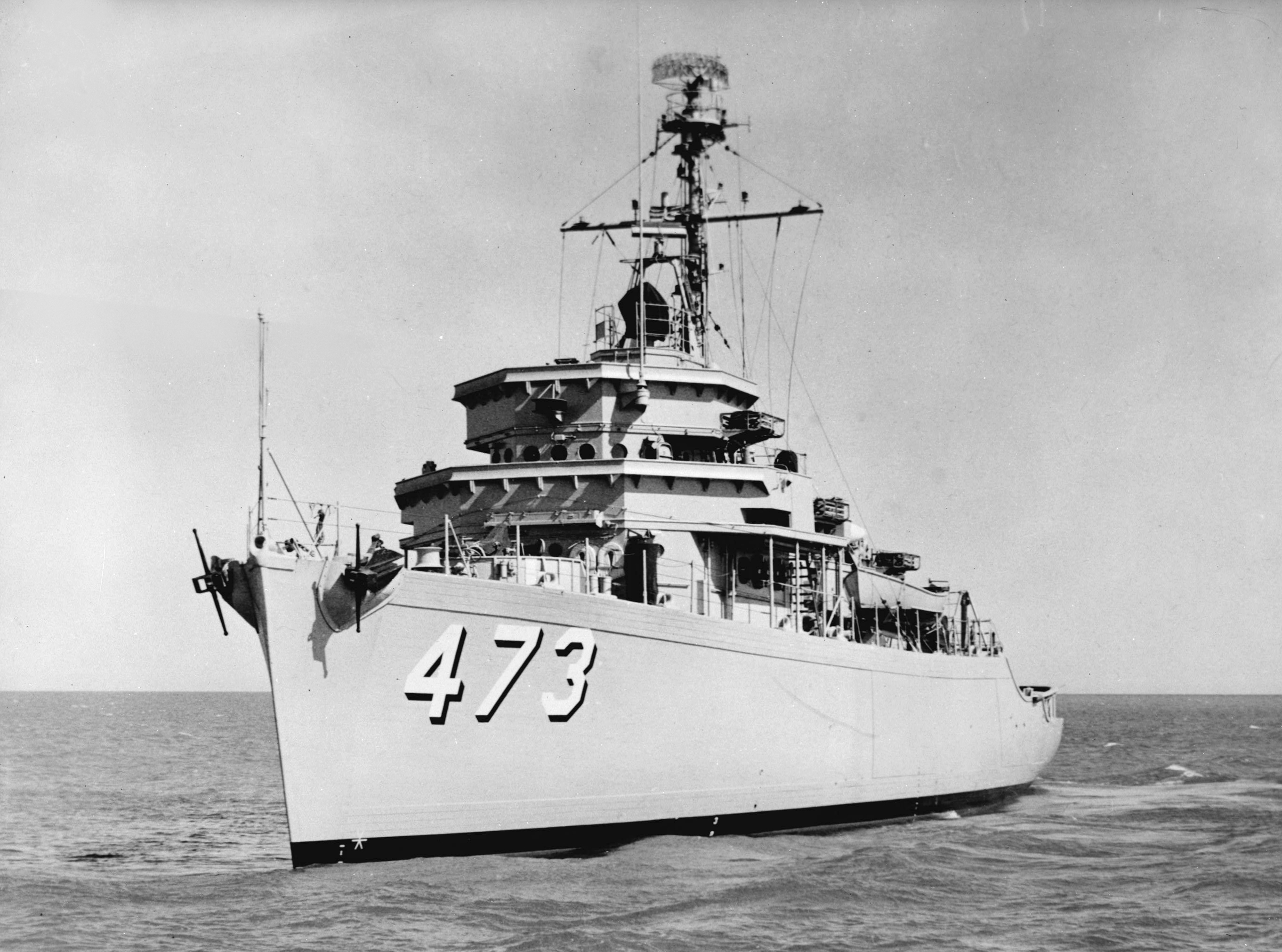
- USS Vigor (AM-473) on 20 September 1954

History

United States
- Name: USS Vigor (AM-473)
- Laid down: 16 June 1952
- Launched: 23 June 1953
- Commissioned: 8 November 1954
- Reclassified: MSO-473, 7 February 1955
- Decommissioned: 4 April 1972
- Stricken: 4 April 1972
- Fate: Sold to Spain, 4 April 1972

History

Spain
- Name: Guadiana (M44)
- Acquired: 4 April 1972
- Decommissioned: 1 November 1999
- Stricken: 1 November 1999
- Fate: Scrapped

General characteristics
- Class & type: Agile-class minesweeper
- Displacement: 775 tons
- Length: 172 ft (52 m)
- Beam: 35 ft (11 m)
- Draft: 10 ft (3.0 m)
- Speed: 14 knots
- Complement: 70
- Armament: one 40 mm., two .50 cal (12.7 mm) machine guns

USS Vigor (AM-473/MSO-473) was an Agile-class minesweeper acquired by the U.S. Navy for the dangerous task of removing mines from minefields laid in the water to prevent ships from passing.

Vigor was laid down on 16 June 1952 at Manitowoc, Wisconsin, by the Burger Boat Co.; launched on 23 June 1953, sponsored by Mrs. Charles C. Kerwin; and commissioned at the Boston Naval Shipyard on 8 November 1954.

== East Coast service ==
After brief duty at Boston, Massachusetts, the minesweeper moved to Key West, Florida, for shakedown training early in 1955. During the cruise, she was redesignated MSO-473 on 7 February. Minesweeper refresher training at Charleston, South Carolina, followed, and Vigor then began a tour of duty with the Naval Ordnance Laboratory at Port Everglades, Florida.

Later that year, Vigor became a training ship, first for the Underwater Object Locator School at Key West and then for the Naval Mine Warfare School at Yorktown, Virginia. Early in 1956, she again headed south to participate in the annual Caribbean exercise, Operation Springboard. During her cruise to the West Indies, Vigor made port calls at San Juan, Puerto Rico; and Fredricksted, St. Croix, in the Virgin Islands.

== 1956 Med cruise ==
Following her return to Charleston and operations out of that port, she got underway on 1 May for her first deployment to the Mediterranean Sea. During that cruise, she visited Harwich, England; Ostend, Belgium; and Lisbon, Portugal, as well as touching at the usual U.S. 6th Fleet ports of call along the Mediterranean coast. She concluded that cruise at Charleston on 6 October and resumed operations from that base.

== Testing and evaluation ==
Vigor continued that duty until the latter part of 1957, when she was reassigned to the Naval Mine Defense Laboratory at Panama City, Florida. From that new home port, the minesweeper operated with Mine Division 85 participating in various experimental projects conducted by the laboratory. For the next 14 years, she remained based at Panama City conducting operations for both the Mine Warfare Laboratory and with the Operational Test and Evaluation Force. During her assignment there, she also deployed to the Mediterranean five more times, patrolled the windward passage between Cuba and Haiti during the Cuban Missile Crisis, operating with the 6th Fleet for six months at a time. Each time she returned to Panama City she resumed normal duty which was broken periodically by overhauls at various locations.

== Decommissioning ==
On New Year's Day 1971, the ship's base was changed back to Charleston. She left Panama City on the 18th and arrived in Charleston on the 27th. After 15 months of duty with the Mine Force, Vigor was decommissioned at Charleston on 4 April 1972. Simultaneously, her name was struck from the Navy list, and she was transferred to the government of Spain. As of the beginning of 1980, she remained an active unit of the Spanish Navy, serving under the name Guadiana (M44).
