= USS Sagacity (MSO-469) =

Minesweeper of the United States Navy

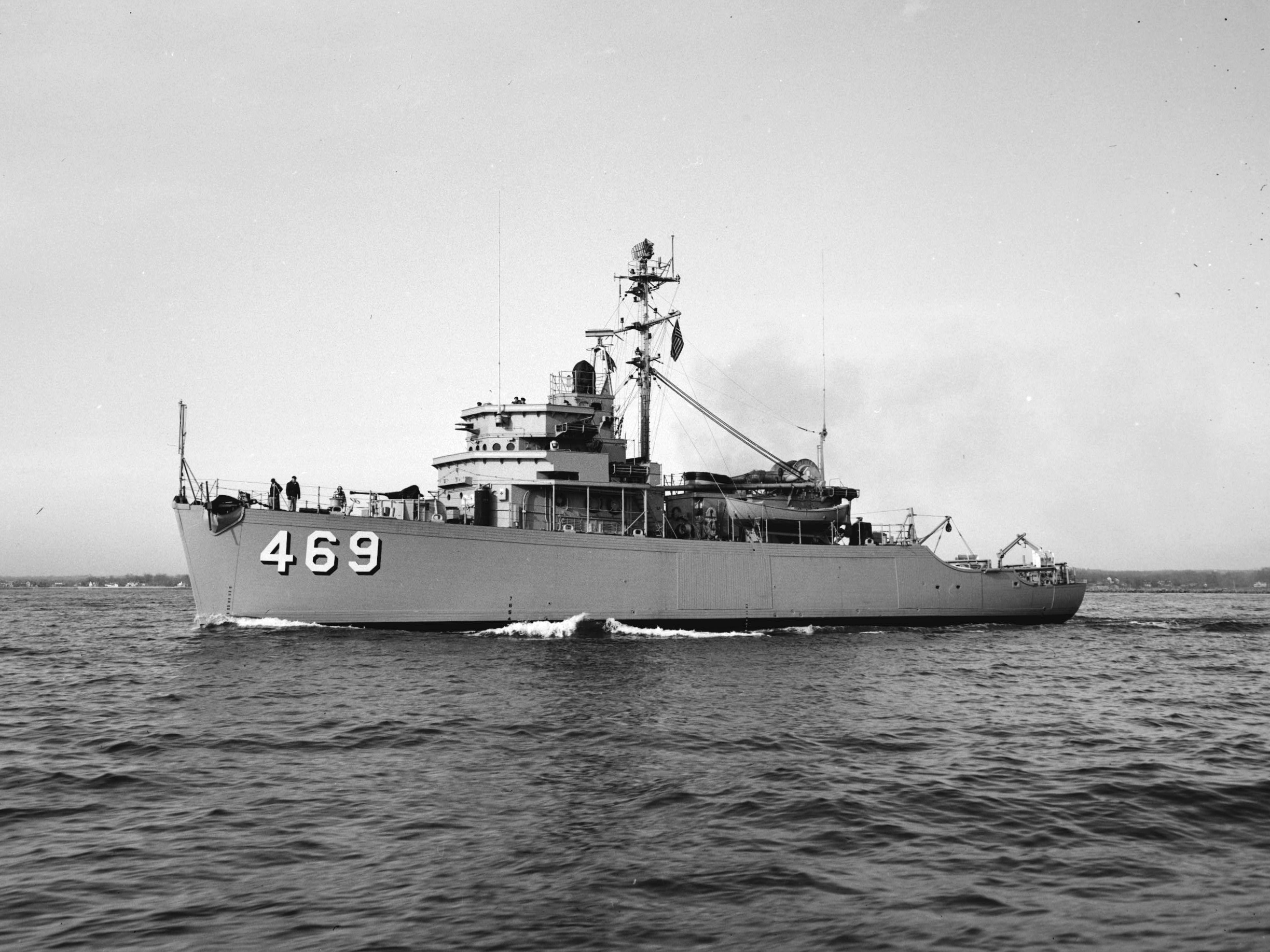
- USS Sagacity (MSO-469) underway in 1955

History

United States
- Name: USS Sagacity (MSO-469)
- Laid down: 6 October 1952
- Launched: 20 February 1954
- Commissioned: 20 January 1955
- Decommissioned: 1 October 1970
- Stricken: 1 October 1970
- Home port: Charleston, South Carolina
- Fate: Sold for scrapping, 1971

General characteristics
- Displacement: 775 tons (full load)
- Length: 172 ft (52 m)
- Beam: 36 ft (11 m)
- Draught: 10 ft (3.0 m)
- Speed: 15 knots
- Complement: 74
- Armament: one 40 mm mount

USS Sagacity (AM-469/MSO-469) was an Agile-class minesweeper acquired by the U.S. Navy for the task of removing mines that had been placed in the water to prevent the safe passage of ships.

Sagacity (AM-469) was laid down on 6 October 1952 by the Luders Marine Construction Co., Stamford, Connecticut; launched on 20 February 1954; sponsored by Mrs. Loretta B. McCue; and commissioned on 20 January 1955.

== Sagacity’s first Med cruise ==
Redesignated MSO-469 on 7 February, Sagacity completed shakedown training in May, then took up local operations out of her home port, Charleston, South Carolina. Assigned to Mine Division (MinDiv) 84, she conducted her first eastern Atlantic-Mediterranean deployment in the fall of 1956. The four-month deployment was followed by a return to minesweeping exercises in the Caribbean and off the Carolina and Florida coasts.

== Assigned various duties ==
Biennially deployed to the Mediterranean for duty with the U.S. 6th Fleet from that time until 1967, she was employed on projects for the Naval Mine Warfare School at Charleston, the Mine Defense Laboratory at Panama City, Florida, and the Naval Ordnance Test Facility at Fort Lauderdale, Florida, during her U.S. 2d Fleet duty. Occasionally assigned to planeguard duty for helicopters from amphibious assault ships, target towing, and to patrol duties, she was also a unit of the Project Mercury recovery force in January 1962 and participated in the recovery effort of the 1966 Palomares B-52 crash.

== Her last 6th Fleet tour of duty ==
In January 1968, Sagacity steamed east for her last tour with the U.S. 6th Fleet, spending most of her time in the western Mediterranean. She returned to Charleston in June; and, until March 1970, operated off the U.S. East Coast.

== Grounding in Charleston harbor ==
In March 1970, she grounded at the entrance to Charleston harbor, causing extensive damage to her rudders, shafts, screws, keel, and hull.

== Inactivation and decommissioning ==
Five months later, as the Navy continued its force level reduction, Sagacity was ordered inactivated. She was decommissioned and struck from the Navy list on 1 October 1970. In 1971, she was sold for scrapping.
