= USS Implicit (AM-455) =

Minesweeper of the United States Navy

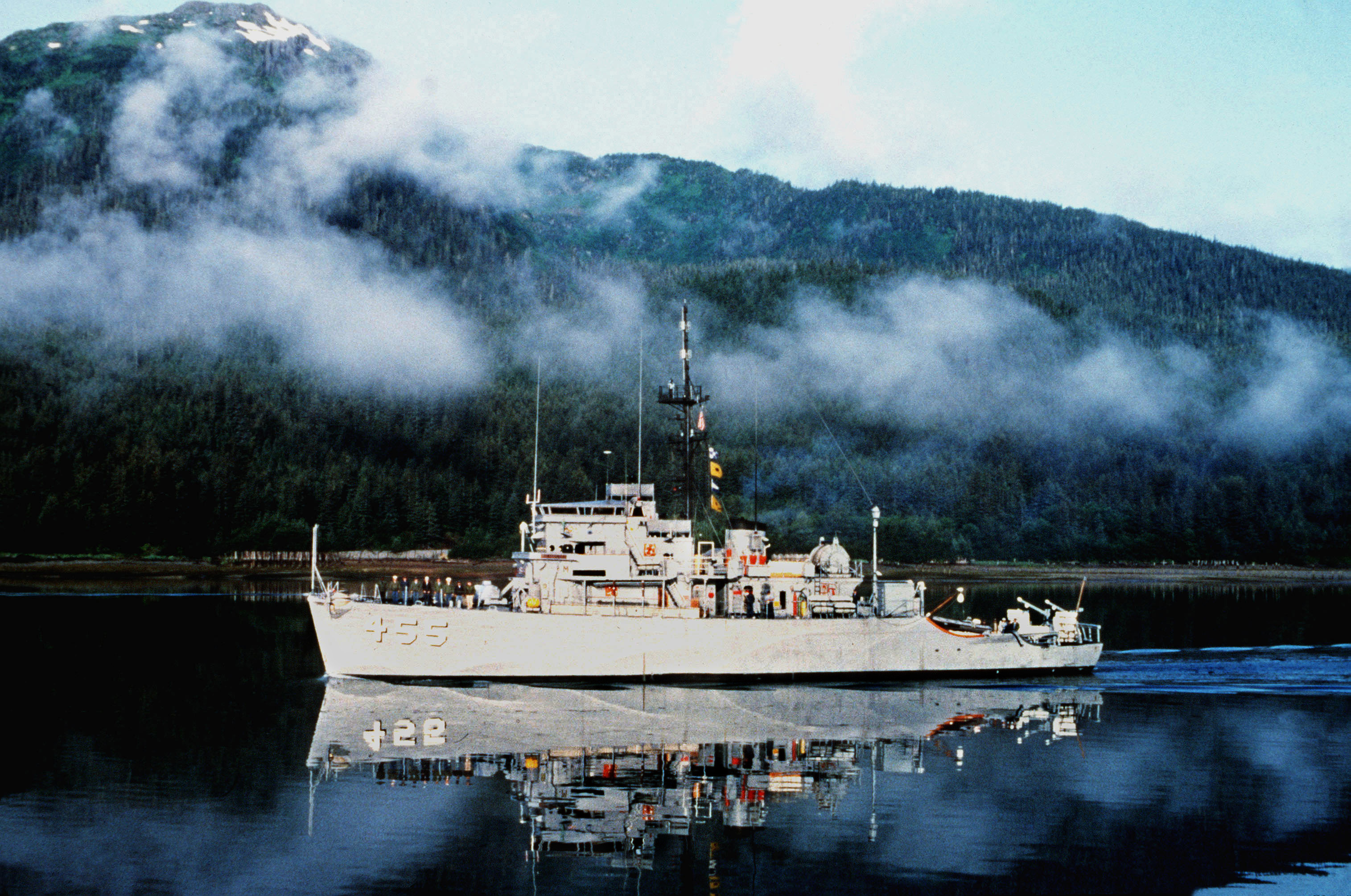

History

United States
- Name: USS Implicit (MSO-455)
- Builder: Wilmington Boat Works, Wilmington, California
- Laid down: 29 October 1952
- Launched: 1 August 1953
- Commissioned: 10 March 1954
- Decommissioned: 30 September 1994
- Reclassified: MSO-455, 7 February 1955
- Stricken: 20 November 1994
- Home port: Long Beach, California
- Fate: transferred to the Republic of China, 30 September 1994

Republic of China
- Name: ROCS Yung Yang (MSO-1306)
- Acquired: 30 September 1994
- Decommissioned: 1 July 2025
- Fate: Scrapped, July 2026

General characteristics
- Class & type: Agile class minesweeper
- Displacement: 620 tons
- Length: 172 ft (52.43 m)
- Beam: 36 ft (10.97 m)
- Draught: 10 ft (3.05 m)
- Propulsion: Four Packard ID1700 diesel engines, two shafts, two controllable pitch propellers
- Speed: 16 knots
- Complement: 72
- Armament: one 40 mm mount

USS Implicit (AM-455/MSO-455) was an Agile-class minesweeper acquired by the U.S. Navy for the task of removing mines that had been placed in the water to prevent the safe passage of ships.

Implicit was launched by Wilmington Boat Works, Wilmington, California 1 August 1953; sponsored by Mrs. Landon Horton, and commissioned 10 March 1954.

== West Coast deployment ==
One of a class of new minesweepers constructed entirely of nonmagnetic materials, Implicit conducted shakedown training in California waters during mid-1954. She then began an operational pattern which was to continue for three years: minesweeping exercises, fleet maneuvers, and training cruises in the California-Mexico area. The ship then got underway from her home port, Long Beach, California, 7 August 1957 to join the U.S. 7th Fleet in the strategic Far East. During this deployment, Implicit operated with Japanese ships, Nationalist Chinese minesweepers, and with regular units of the U.S. 7th Fleet on their daily mission of maintaining peace and security in the area. She returned to Long Beach 1 March 1958.

== Second Far East cruise ==
Training and readiness exercises out of Long Beach occupied the minesweeper until her second cruise to the Far East. She steamed out of Long Beach 8 January 1960 and during six months in the western Pacific Ocean took part in mine warfare exercises with 7th Fleet ships in the Philippines and off Okinawa. Implicit arrived Long Beach after this cruise 17 July 1960.

== Participating in joint U.S.-Canadian exercises ==
Training operations and mine countermeasures drill were carried out until August 1961, when the veteran minecraft took part in joint American-Canadian mine-sweeping exercises off British Columbia.

== Supporting Vietnam operations ==
Returning to Long Beach, the ship prepared for another Far Eastern deployment, this time in support of the American advisory effort in South Vietnam. Sailing 2 January 1962 for this embattled country, Implicit first participated in SEATO maneuvers and then moved to various ports in South Vietnam to assist in training officers and men. She returned to Long Beach from South Vietnam 17 August 1962.

== Joint exercises with the Republic of China Navy ==
Implicit resumed a schedule of underway training and fleet exercises out of Long Beach until her next deployment, sailing with her division 3 January 1964. Stopping at Guam and Midway Island en route, she arrived off Taiwan for mine-warfare exercises in March. In May she returned to the Formosa Strait for a second operation, in which the ship acted under a Chinese Nationalist division commander in a demonstration of cooperation and smooth combined operations. Following her second SEATO exercise in the Pacific, Implicit resumed to Long Beach 28 July 1964 for a yard overhaul and readiness tactics and training along the coast of California.

== Supporting Operation Market Time ==
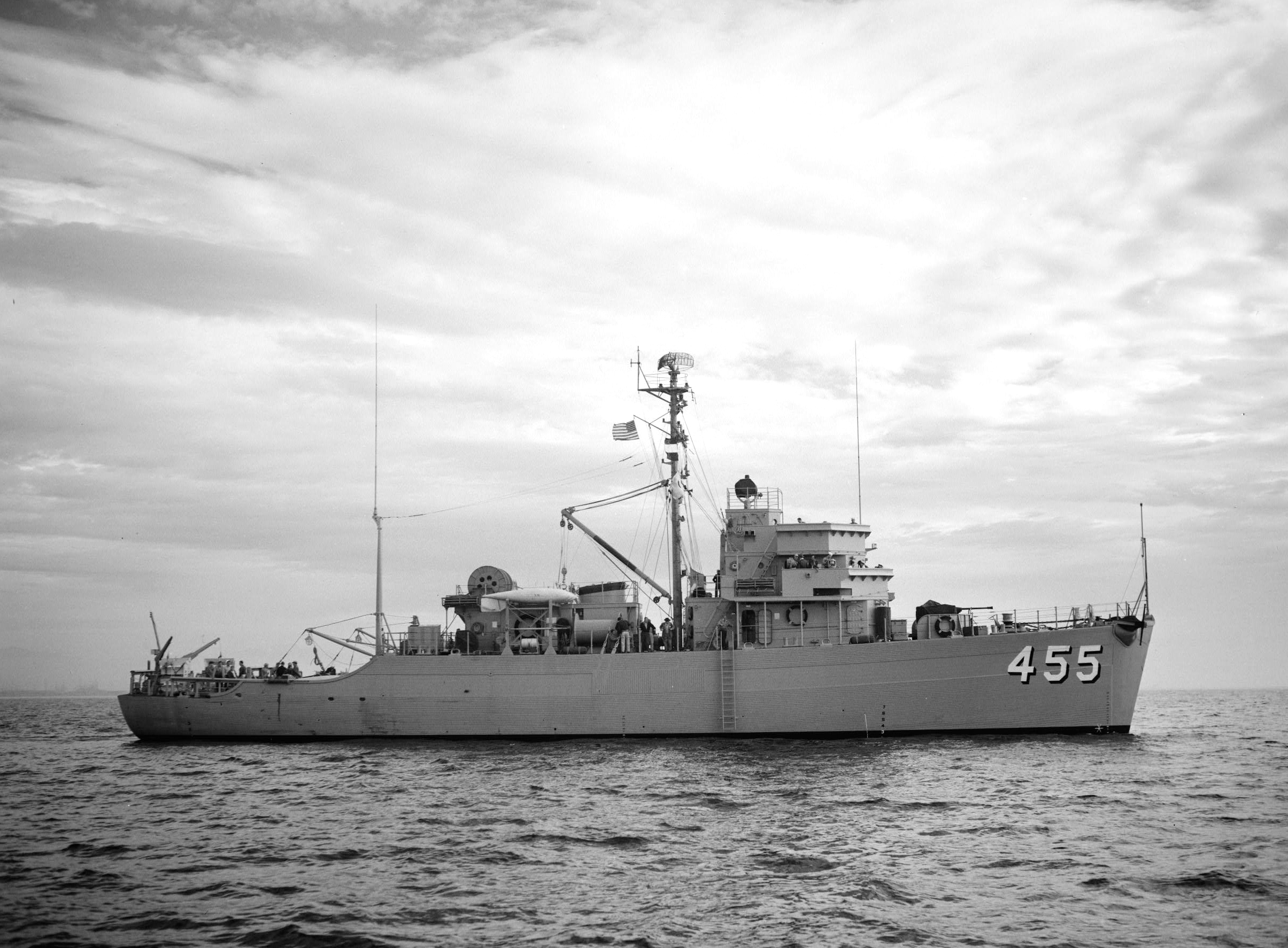
Implicit in 1954.

Implicit departed Long Beach 21 September 1965 for the Far East. A unit of Mine Division 91, she joined the "Market Time Patrol" along Vietnam's 1,000-mile coastline to intercept Vietcong men and supplies trying to infiltrate into South Vietnam. Once she was fired on by Vietcong while cruising close to shore and retaliated with her 40mm. and other machineguns.

After a 2-week stopover, Implicit departed Kaohsiung, Taiwan, 14 January to continue her "Market Time" patrols into late 1966. By 15 March she had boarded more than 1,000 junks and sampans for inspection. On 22 and 23 March, the minesweeper fired nearly 700 rounds of 40mm. ammunition supporting small South Vietnamese naval craft under fire from enemy shore batteries. On 28 June Implicit got underway with a mine division for Long Beach, California, via Guam, Kwajalein, and Pearl Harbor arriving Long Beach, 2 August From 13 to 20 September she participated in minesweeping Operation Eager Angler off Santa; Rosa Island. Implicit joined a carrier task unit for Operation COMPTUEX through December and then continued training operations off Long Beach into 1967.

== Decommissioning ==
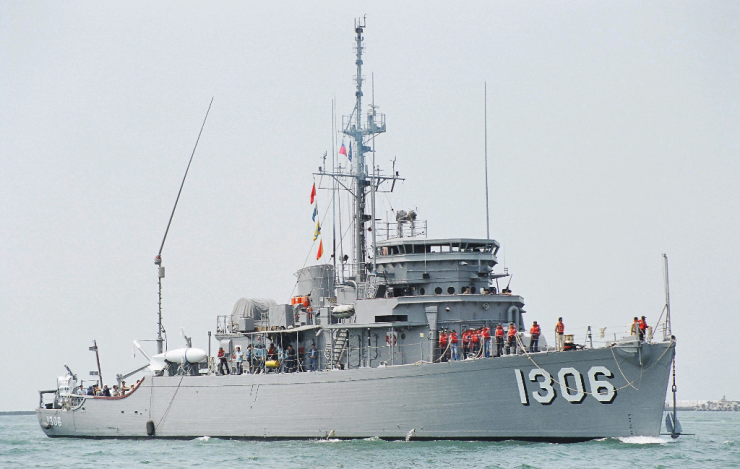
Yung Yang(MSO-1306)

Implicit was decommissioned 30 September 1994 and handed over to Republic of China Navy among 3 other mine sweepers. She served in the ROC Navy until July 1st, 2025, when she was decommissioned. She was scrapped in July 2026 in Kaohsiung with parts being saved to be used in her sistership USS Lucid (MSO-458) currently serving as a museum in Stockton, California.

She was the last wooden ship in the Navy that carried a full inspection cycle.
