= USS Rival (MSO-468) =

Minesweeper of the United States Navy

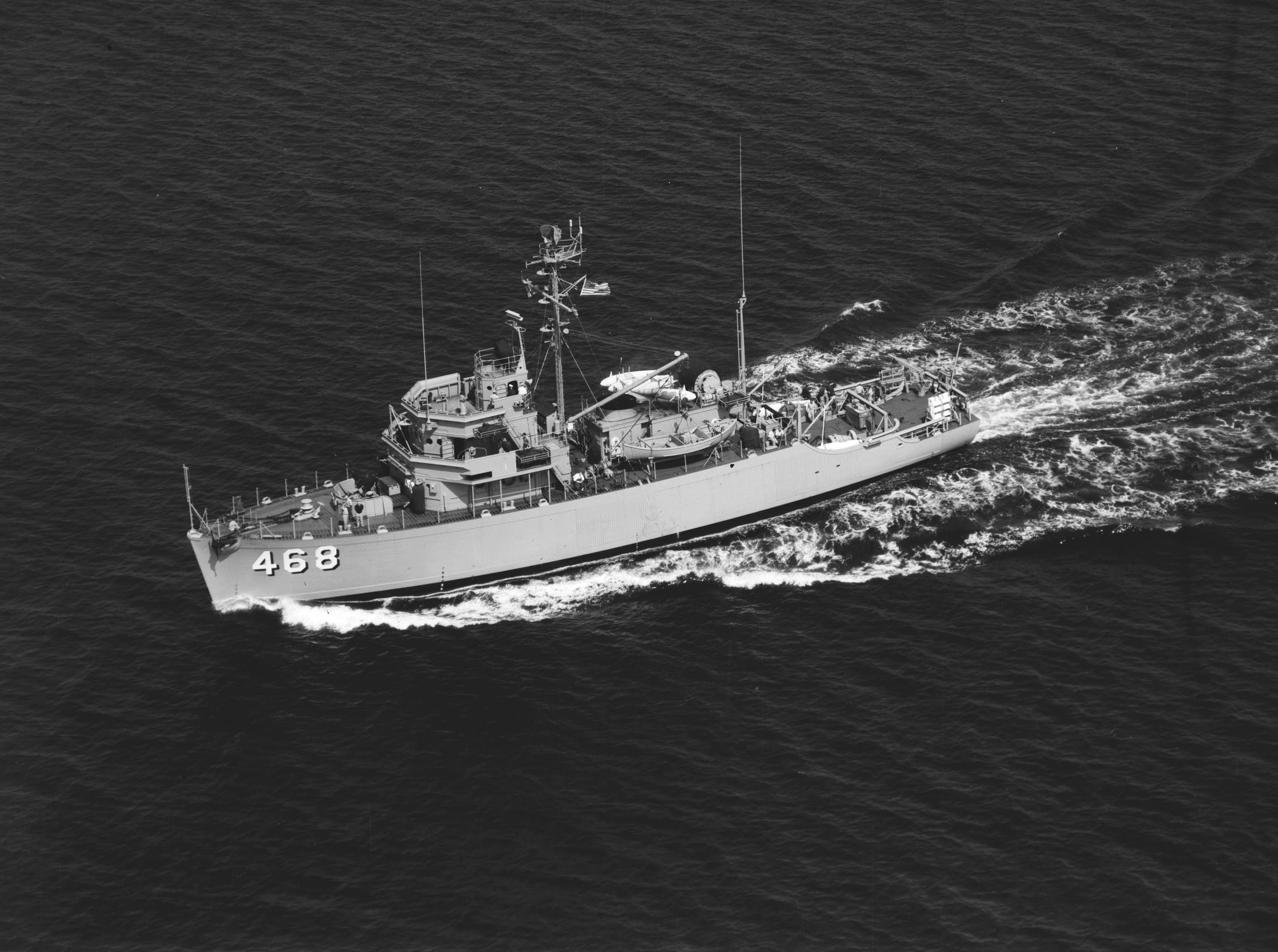

History

United States
- Name: Rival
- Laid down: 1 February 1952
- Launched: 15 August 1953
- Commissioned: 3 September 1954
- Decommissioned: 15 May 1970
- Stricken: 1 February 1971
- Home port: Charleston, South Carolina
- Fate: Sold, August 1971

General characteristics
- Displacement: 775 tons (full load)
- Length: 172 ft (52 m)
- Beam: 36 ft (11 m)
- Draught: 10 ft (3.0 m)
- Speed: 15 knots
- Complement: 74
- Armament: one 40 mm mount

USS Rival (AM-468/MSO-468) was an Agile-class minesweeper acquired by the U.S. Navy for the task of removing mines that had been placed in the water to prevent the safe passage of ships.

Rival was laid down 1 February 1952 by the Luders Marine Construction Co., Stamford, Connecticut; designated AM-468; launched 15 August 1953; sponsored by Mrs. F. X. Forest; and commissioned 3 September 1954.

== East Coast operations ==
Redesignated MSO-468 in February 1955, Rival was assigned as flagship, Mine Division 85 during shakedown. In March 1955 she began operations out of her homeport of Charleston, South Carolina. Based there since that time, she has operated primarily along the U.S. East Coast, rotating biennially, except for 1962, to the U.S. 6th Fleet in the Mediterranean.

She participated in Fleet and NATO exercises and, in 1966, in the successful search (20 February to 8 April) for a nuclear bomb lost off Palomares, Spain in the Palomares hydrogen bombs incident. During her operations with the U.S. 2d Fleet, she has conducted exercises in the Charleston area and off Puerto Rico and has provided services at Yorktown, Virginia, and at Mayport, Florida, and Panama City, Florida. In 1961, she added Caribbean deployments to her schedule and continued them through the decade.

== Last Mediterranean cruise of the 1960s ==
In December 1968, Rival returned from her last Mediterranean cruise of the 1960s. Through 1969 she remained in the western Atlantic Ocean and in the Caribbean. In 1970, she prepared for modernization. She arrived at the Todd Shipyard, Brooklyn, New York, on 10 June to begin the work, however the contract was terminated 16 October 1970 for the convenience of the government. Rival, along with three other ships of her class, was towed to Philadelphia Naval Shipyard for storage pending final disposition.

== Decommissioning ==
Rival was decommissioned 15 May 1970 and struck from the Navy list on 1 February 1971. In August 1971, Rival, and her three sisters, were sold to Mr. Charles Gural of Rahway, New Jersey, with the Navy receiving $2,700 for Rival.
