= USS Pinnacle (MSO-462) =

Minesweeper of the United States Navy

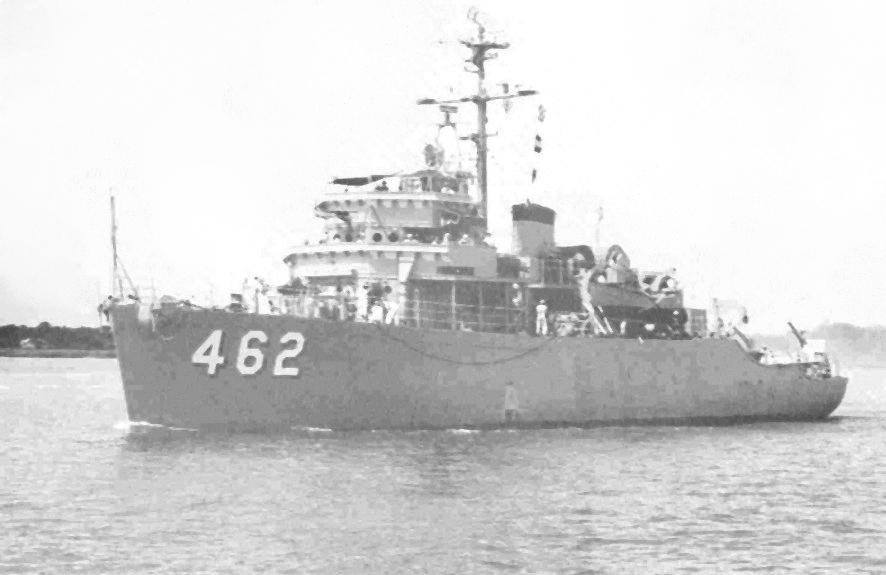
- USS Pinnacle (MSO-462) circa 1965

History

United States
- Name: USS Pinnacle
- Builder: Higgins Industries Inc., New Orleans, Louisiana
- Laid down: 24 August 1953
- Launched: 3 January 1955, as AM-462
- Commissioned: 21 October 1955
- Reclassified: MSO-462 (Ocean Minesweeper), 7 February 1955
- Stricken: 1 November 1977
- Fate: Sold for scrapping, 1 May 1978

General characteristics
- Class & type: Aggressive-class minesweeper
- Displacement: 630 long tons (640 t) light; 755 long tons (767 t) full load
- Length: 172 ft (52 m)
- Beam: 35 ft (11 m)
- Draft: 10 ft (3 m)
- Propulsion: 4 × Packard ID1700 diesel engines; 2 × shafts; 2 × controllable pitch propellers
- Speed: 14 knots (26 km/h; 16 mph)
- Complement: 6 officers and 74 enlisted men
- Armament: 1 × single 40 mm gun mount (later replaced by 1 × twin 20 mm gun mount); 2 × .50 cal (12.7 mm) twin Browning M2 machine guns

USS Pinnacle (AM-462/MSO-462) was an Aggressive-class minesweeper acquired by the U.S. Navy for the task of removing mines that had been placed in the water to prevent the safe passage of ships.

Pinnacle was laid down 24 August 1953 as AM-462 by Higgins Industries Inc., New Orleans, Louisiana and launched 3 January 1955. She was redesignated as an Ocean Minesweeper, MSO-462, 7 February 1955 and commissioned on 21 October 1955.

== North Atlantic operations ==
Pinnacle was assigned to MinDiv 84 and completed shakedown in Chesapeake Bay and post shakedown overhaul at Charleston, South Carolina, and in June 1956 began preparations for her first deployment to the Mediterranean. Sailing east on 4 September, she visited the United Kingdom and the Netherlands, took part in NATO maneuvers in the North Sea then operated with the U.S. 6th Fleet in the Mediterranean from 20 October to 21 January 1957.

On 6 February she returned to Charleston, South Carolina, then, through September, furnished services for the Office of Naval Research. Overhaul and local operations followed and in May, 1958, Pinnacle again sailed for the Mediterranean.

== Middle East Crisis operations ==
As tension in the Middle East rose to a new height, Pinnacle steamed directly to the eastern Mediterranean and for most of that deployment cruised off the Levantine states. Between 1 August and 2 October she spent six weeks off Beirut as the 6th Fleet answered Lebanese President Camille Chamoun's request for aid. En route home a series of engineering casualties resulted in the loss of the use of her main engines. Taken in tow by USS Nimble (MSO-459), she arrived at Charleston, South Carolina, 3 November.

== Stateside Overhaul ==
Overhaul, local operations and Caribbean amphibious exercises took up 1959 and in January 1960, Pinnacle deployed to the Mediterranean for another tour with the U.S. 6th Fleet. Returning in June, she resumed a series of local operations Mine Warfare school ship duties and amphibious exercise in the Caribbean. In late January 1962 she steamed to Cape Canaveral, Florida, to act as a back-up ship during the Mercury 6 space shot. In April she reported for duty with the Mine Defense Laboratory, Panama City, Florida, and after upkeep at the end of the summer sailed north to participate in joint U.S.-Canada exercises in the North Atlantic Ocean.

== Continued U.S. 6th Fleet operations ==
In May 1963, Pinnacle again deployed to the Mediterranean and into 1970 regularly rotated between duty with the 6th Fleet, local operations and training exercises off the east coast, and extended deployment with amphibious forces in the Caribbean. Pinnacle participated in the recovery effort of the Palomares Incident in early 1966. Pinnacle was the first ship to locate the missing hydrogen bomb after making sonar contact.

== Deactivation ==
Pinnacle was struck from the Naval Vessel Register on 1 November 1977; sold for scrapping on 1 May 1978 by the Defense Reutilization and Marketing Service to C. B. Herter of Hopewell, Virginia, for $26,491.
