= USS Vital (MSO-474) =

Minesweeper of the United States Navy

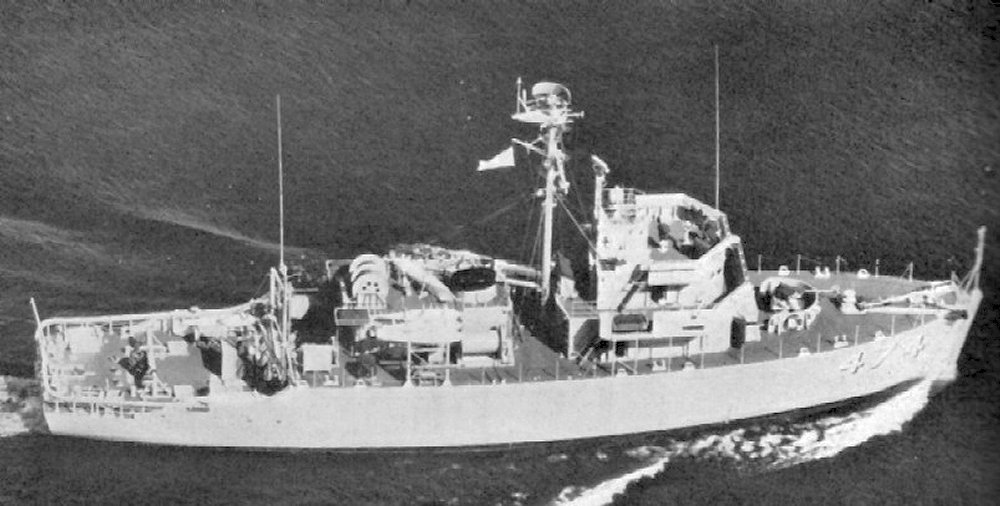
- USS Vital underway c. 1955

History

United States
- Name: USS Vital
- Builder: Burger Boat Company, Manitowoc, Wisconsin
- Laid down: 31 October 1952
- Launched: 12 August 1953, as AM-474
- Commissioned: 9 June 1955
- Decommissioned: 22 September 1972
- Reclassified: MSO-474 (Ocean Minesweeper), 7 February 1955
- Stricken: September 1977
- Fate: Sold for scrapping, 21 July 1979

General characteristics
- Class & type: Aggressive-class minesweeper
- Displacement: 630 long tons (640 t) light; 755 long tons (767 t) full load
- Length: 172 ft (52 m)
- Beam: 35 ft (11 m)
- Draft: 10 ft (3 m)
- Propulsion: 4 × Packard ID1700 diesel engines; 2 × shafts; 2 × controllable pitch propellers
- Speed: 14 knots (26 km/h; 16 mph)
- Complement: 70
- Armament: 1 × single 40 mm gun mount (later replaced by 1 × twin 20 mm gun mount); 2 × .50 cal (12.7 mm) twin Browning M2 machine guns

USS Vital (AM-474/MSO-474) was an Agile-class minesweeper in service with the United States Navy from 1955 to 1972. She was sold for scrap in 1979.

== History ==
Vital was laid down as AM-474 on 31 October 1952 at Manitowoc, Wisconsin, by the Burger Boat Company; launched on 12 August 1953; sponsored by Mrs. Edwina Smith; redesignated MSO-474 on 7 February 1955; and commissioned on 9 June 1955 at the Boston Naval Shipyard.

=== Mediterranean and North Sea operations ===
Following shakedown and an availability at Charleston, South Carolina, Vital was deployed to the Mediterranean late in the spring of 1956. In addition to normal 6th Fleet operations and Mediterranean port visits, she participated in a special NATO minesweeping exercise conducted in the North Sea during September and October. The minesweeper returned to Charleston later that fall and began operations along the southern Atlantic seaboard of the United States. In March 1957, she moved to the Gulf of Mexico for a three-month training period at the conclusion of which she returned to Charleston and resumed normal duty.

=== Panama City homeport operations ===
In July 1958, Vital's home port was changed from Charleston to Panama City, Florida. From the latter port, she participated in experimental work with the Operational Test and Evaluation Force under the auspices of the Naval Mine Defense Laboratory. She remained based at that port for the next 12½ years, departing periodically for deployments in foreign waters. The first break in her experimental work schedule came in August 1960 when she embarked upon a three-month cruise in the Caribbean.

=== Second Mediterranean tour of duty ===
After returning to Panama City in November and resuming duty with the Naval Mine Defense Laboratory, she remained so occupied until February 1962, at which time the minesweeper headed across the Atlantic Ocean with the other units of Mine Division (MinDiv) 81 for a six-month tour of duty with the U.S. 6th Fleet in the Mediterranean.

=== Miscellaneous deployments ===
She arrived back in Panama City in August and resumed services to the Naval Mine Defense Laboratory. Following 14 months of normal operations in the Gulf of Mexico, Vital headed south for a four-month assignment in the West Indies which she concluded at Panama City, Florida on 9 February 1964.

Upon the conclusion of that Caribbean deployment, Vital settled down to a routine of operations out of Panama City broken only by three Mediterranean deployments and an ascent of the Mississippi River in May 1967 to participate in the Cotton Carnival at Memphis, Tennessee. On 1 January 1971, Vital received word that her home port had changed back to Charleston. She arrived there on the 27th and, for the next 20 months, operated from that base as a unit of the Atlantic Fleet Mine Force.

=== Decommissioning ===
On 22 September 1972, Vital was decommissioned at Charleston. She was towed to Hampton Roads, Virginia, late in November and, on the 30th, placed in the Norfolk Group of the Atlantic Reserve Fleet. She remained there until struck from the Navy List in September 1977. The ship was sold for scrap on 21 July 1979 by the Defense Reutilization and Marketing Service to Union Minerals and Alloys Corporation of New York City for $25,250.
