= USS Observer (MSO-461) =

Minesweeper of the United States Navy

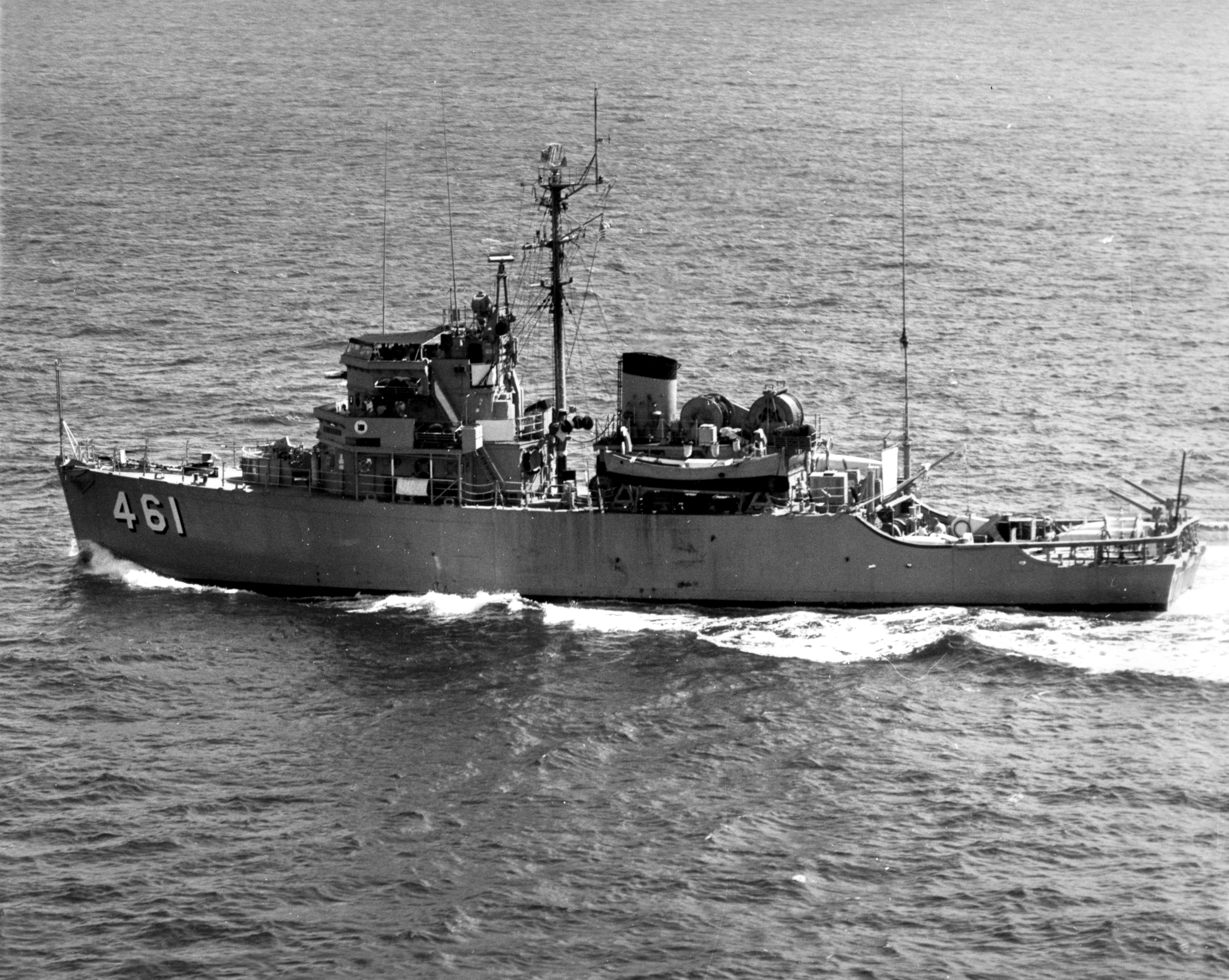
- Observer underway on 7 May 1963

History

United States
- Laid down: 20 July 1953
- Launched: 19 October 1954
- Commissioned: 31 August 1955
- Decommissioned: July 1, 1972
- Refit: 1970
- Stricken: 1 November 1977
- Home port: Charleston, SC
- Fate: Sold for scrapping 1 April 1979

General characteristics
- Displacement: 775 tons
- Length: 172 ft (52 m)
- Beam: 36 ft (11 m)
- Draught: 10 ft (3.0 m)
- Speed: 15 knots
- Complement: 65
- Armament: one 40 mm mount

USS Observer (AM-461/MSO-461) was an Agile-class minesweeper acquired by the U.S. Navy for the task of removing mines that had been placed in the water to prevent the safe passage of ships.

The second ship to be named Observer by the Navy was laid down 20 July 1953 as AM-461 by Higgins, Inc., New Orleans, Louisiana; launched 19 October 1954 sponsored by Mrs. E. V. Richards, reclassified MSO-461 on 2 February 1955, commissioned 31 August 1955.

== European operations ==
After fitting out, Observer joined the Atlantic Fleet Mine Force and participated in minesweeping exercises prior to deploying to the Mediterranean. Observer sailed for the Mediterranean 1 May 1956 as part of Mine Division 85. After ports of call in the Mediterranean, she participated in NATO exercises in the area of Harwich, England. Following these exercises, Observer made goodwill visits to several Scandinavian countries, France, Portugal, Italy, and Gibraltar. She departed Gibraltar 28 September and began the long trip home, arriving 13 October.

== North Atlantic operations ==
Observer participated in operations along the Atlantic seaboard, in the Caribbean and off Panama during the first half of 1957. In June 1957, she visited Hampton Roads, Virginia, for the Naval Review. Then Observer put into Norfolk Navy Yard for an extended overhaul. Then came refresher training, and exercises prior to deploying to the Mediterranean in January 1958. Observer continued this trend of operations, deploying with the U.S. 6th Fleet and participating in exercises along the Atlantic coast and in the Caribbean, the observer participated in the Cuban blockade in the windward passage from January 1963 and returning to Charleston in may. Observer's last exercise was Operation Snowy Beach off the coast of Maine, January 1972.

== Decommissioning ==
Observer was decommissioned on 1 July 1972, struck from the Navy list 1 November 1977, and was sold for scrapping 1 April 1979.
