= USS Valor (AM-472) =

Minesweeper of the United States Navy

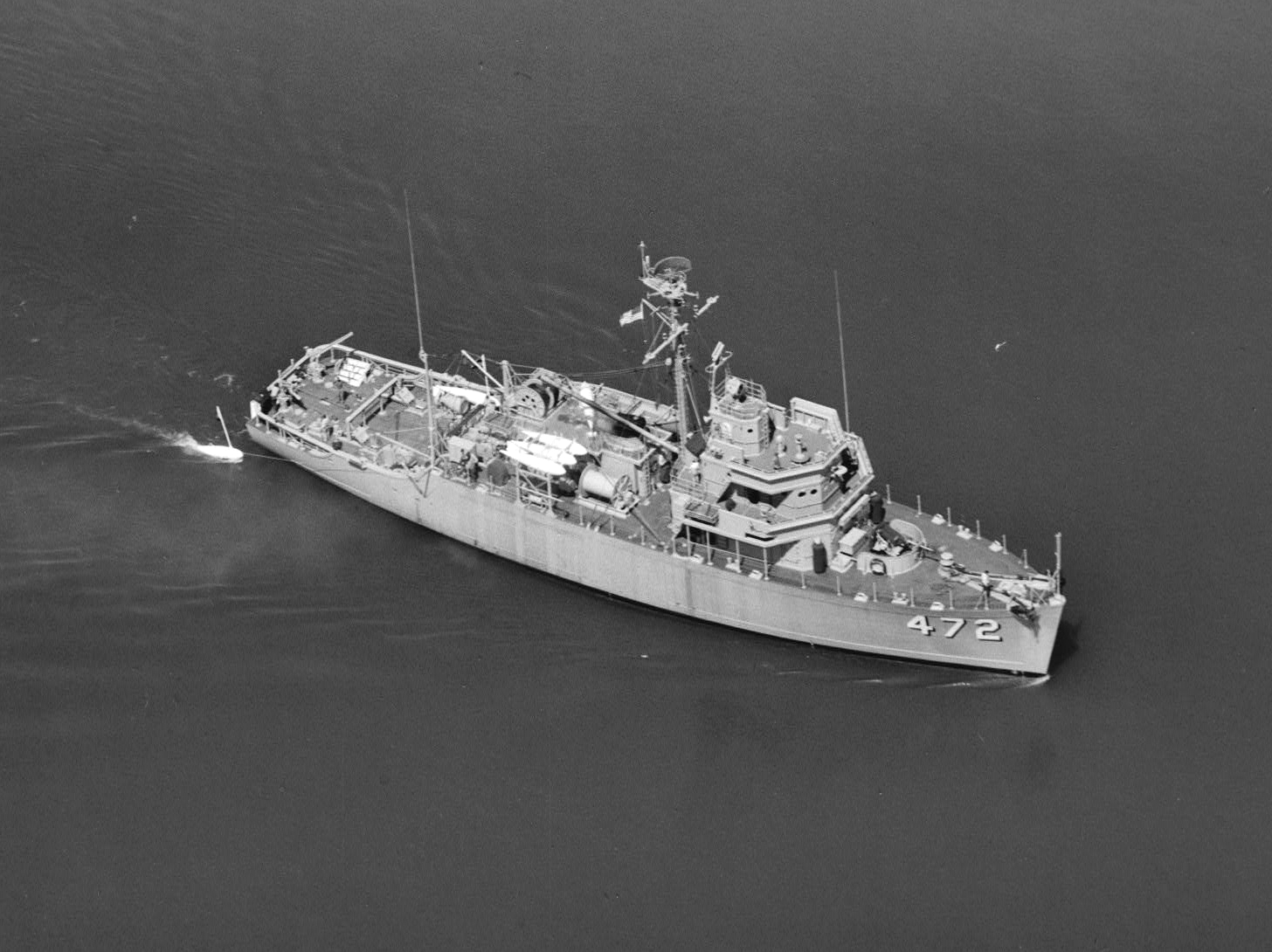
- USS Valor underway in June 1954

History

United States
- Name: USS Valor
- Builder: Burger Boat Company, Manitowoc, Wisconsin
- Laid down: 28 April 1952
- Launched: 13 May 1953
- Commissioned: 29 July 1954, as AM-472
- Decommissioned: July 1970
- Reclassified: MSO-472 (Ocean Minesweeper), 7 February 1955
- Stricken: 1 February 1971
- Fate: Sold for scrapping, 30 August 1971

General characteristics
- Class & type: Agile-class minesweeper
- Displacement: 775 long tons (787 t) full load
- Length: 172 ft (52 m)
- Beam: 35 ft (11 m)
- Draft: 12 ft (3.7 m)
- Propulsion: 4 × Packard ID1700 diesel engines (later replaced by 4 × Waukesha diesels); 2 × shafts; 2 × controllable pitch propellers
- Speed: 14 knots (26 km/h; 16 mph)
- Complement: 8 officers and 70 enlisted men
- Armament: 1 × single 40 mm gun mount (later replaced by 1 × twin 20 mm gun mount); 2 × .50 cal (12.7 mm) twin Browning M2 machine guns

USS Valor (AM-472/MSO-472) was an Agile-class minesweeper in service with the United States Navy from 1954 to 1970. She was sold for scrap in 1971.

== History ==
Valor was laid down on 28 April 1952 at Manitowoc, Wisconsin by the Burger Boat Company; launched on 13 May 1953; sponsored by Mrs. Walter J. Kohler Jr.; towed through the Great Lakes and down the St. Lawrence River to Boston, Massachusetts; and commissioned at Boston on 29 July 1954.

Following preliminary trials, Valor joined Mine Division (MinDiv) 82, Mine Squadron (MinRon) 8, Mine Force, Atlantic Fleet, on 14 September. Immediately thereafter, she steamed to Key West, Florida where she conducted shakedown training through the end of the year. In February 1955 she entered the Charleston Naval Shipyard for an extensive overhaul. On the 7th of that month, she was redesignated ocean minesweeper USS Valor (MSO-472).

=== Atlantic Fleet Mine Force ===
Valor completed repairs and modifications in October and rejoined the Mine Force, though on a detached assignment at the Engineering Experimental Station at Annapolis, Maryland as an engineering prototype. That phase of testing ended on 23 November, and Valor returned to Charleston, but continued experimental duty until December. After that, the minesweeper began normal duty with the Atlantic Fleet Mine Force based at Charleston. That service, broken only by a voyage to Halifax, Nova Scotia in April and May 1956, and by a six-month deployment to the Mediterranean from 29 August 1957 to 12 February 1958, lasted until March 1958.

On 1 March 1958 she began a 10-year association with the Navy Mine Defense Laboratory located at Panama City, Florida. On 16 March she departed Charleston and, on the 29th, arrived in her new home port. In July 1959, after 15 months of duty at Panama City (punctuated by an overhaul at Charleston during the winter of 1958 and 1959) Valor took her first break from mine countermeasures development work when she was deployed to northern European waters.

=== Attached to the Belgian Navy ===
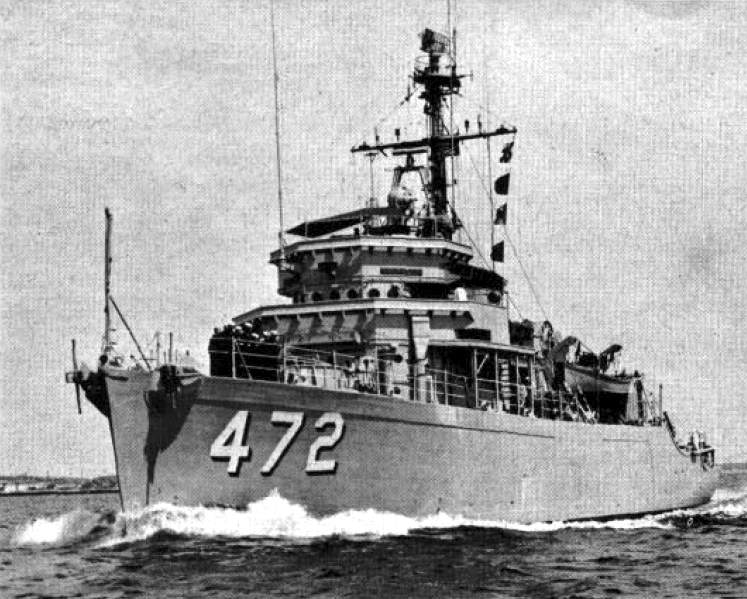
Valor passing through the Strait of Gibraltar while on duty with the Belgian Navy, 1959.

Departing Charleston on 24 July, the minesweeper arrived in Ostend, Belgium on 11 August. There, she changed operational control from the United States Navy to the Belgian Force Navale and joined the Belgian Minesweeper Division 191. On 17 August she and the other elements of the division departed Ostend for a voyage to the waters surrounding the Belgian Congo. The warships arrived in Congolese waters on 9 September and commenced a series of multinational minesweeping exercises involving American, Belgian, and Portuguese units. The exercises ended on 21 September, and Valor and her division mates headed back to Ostend where they arrived on 17 October. Valor continued to operate locally out of Ostend, with the Belgian minesweeper division, until 15 January 1960 when she returned to United States Navy control and headed, via Rota, Spain, back to the United States.

=== Return to the United States ===
The minesweeper arrived back in Panama City on 14 February 1960. Over the next eight years, Valor continued to operate out of Panama City in support of the mine countermeasures development program of the Navy Mine Defense Laboratory. However, that routine was broken frequently, on three occasions by six-month deployments to the 6th Fleet in the Mediterranean, but more often by overhauls, refresher training, and exercises in the West Indies. Her association with the Mine Defense Laboratory ended on 1 March 1968 when she received orders transferring her to MinDiv 44 and reassigning her to Charleston as her home base. The ship operated from that port for the remaining two years of her Navy career. During that period, Valor made one more deployment to the Mediterranean between April and August 1968.

=== Decommissioning and sale ===
Early in October 1969 the minesweeper began a pre-rehabilitation overhaul at Charleston in preparation for extensive modifications to update her equipment. She never finished those modifications, for early in 1970 a board of inspection and survey found her to be "beyond economical repair" and recommended that she be disposed of. She was decommissioned sometime in July 1970 and her name was struck from the Naval Vessel Register on 1 February 1971. On 30 August 1971, she was sold to Mr. Charles Gural of Rahway, New Jersey for $1,700.00 for scrapping.
