= USS Aggressive =

Minesweeper of the United States Navy

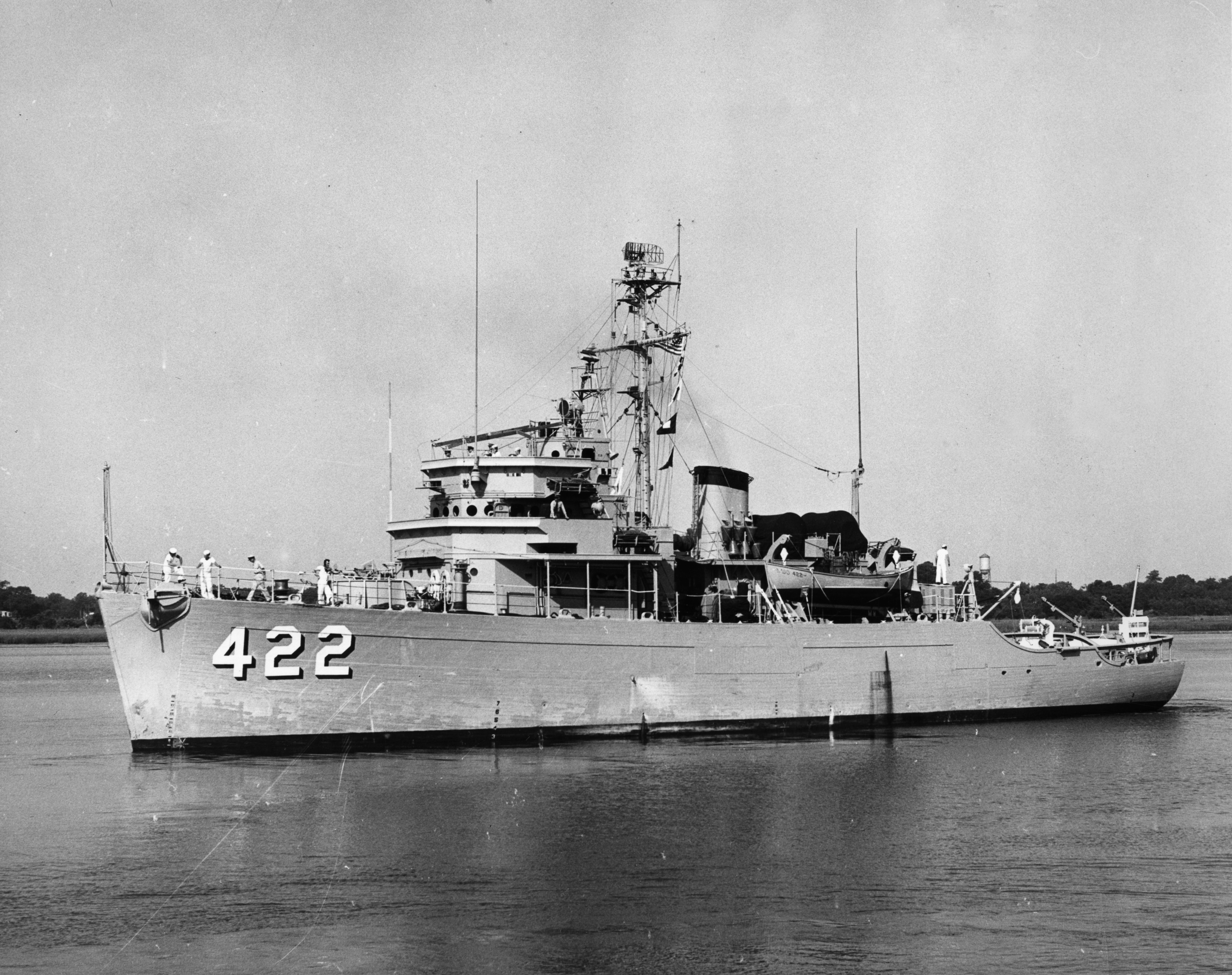
- USS Aggressive (MSO-422)

History

United States
- Name: USS Aggressive
- Builder: Luders Marine Construction Co., Stamford, Connecticut
- Laid down: 25 May 1951
- Launched: 4 October 1952
- Commissioned: 25 November 1953, as AM-422
- Decommissioned: 2 July 1971
- Reclassified: MSO-422 (Ocean Minesweeper), 7 February 1955
- Stricken: 28 February 1975
- Home port: Charleston, South Carolina
- Fate: Sold for scrapping, May 1980

General characteristics
- Class & type: Aggressive-class minesweeper
- Displacement: 853 long tons (867 t) full load
- Length: 172 ft (52 m)
- Beam: 35 ft (11 m)
- Draft: 10 ft (3.0 m)
- Propulsion: 4 × aluminum block, model 1D1700, Packard diesels, 2,400 shp (1,790 kW); 2 × shafts; 2 × controllable pitch propellers
- Speed: 14 knots (26 km/h; 16 mph)
- Complement: Active: 7 officers, 70 enlisted; Naval Reserve Force: 5 officers, 52 enlisted plus 25 reserve
- Sensors & processing systems: AN/SQQ-14 mine countermeasures sonar
- Armament: 1 × twin 20 mm gun mount; 2 × .50 cal (12.7 mm) twin machine guns

USS Aggressive (MSO-422) (originally designated AM-422) was an Agile-class minesweeper. She is the only ship of the United States Navy to be named Aggressive. This was later regarded as a mistake by President John F. Kennedy who stated that the ships should only be employed for "Peace keeping".

She was built by Luders Marine Construction Co. of Stamford, Connecticut, sponsored by Mrs. Stephen M. Archer, and commissioned at Brooklyn, New York, in the New York Naval Shipyard.

== Service history ==
For most of 1954, Aggressive remained in the shipyard for alteration. In February 1955, her designation was changed to MSO-422. Her first deployment, immediately afterwards, had her take part in a mine warfare exercise off the south-east coast of the United States. She took part in the landing of American forces during the Lebanon crisis of 1958.

The ship was home ported at Charleston for her whole naval career. She also provided services to the Naval Mine Warfare School, Charleston; Naval Mine Defense Laboratory, Panama City, Florida; Mine Evaluation Detachment, Key West, Florida; and the Naval Ordnance Laboratory Test Facility, Fort Lauderdale, Florida. Aggressive also took part in several fleet exercises and operations along the Atlantic coast and in the Caribbean.

On 1 October 1970, preparations to deactivate the ship were begun, and she was decommissioned on 2 July 1971. Her name was struck from the Navy list on 28 February 1975, and she was sold to R. E. Williams in May 1980.
