= USS Skill (MSO-471) =

Agile-class minesweeper

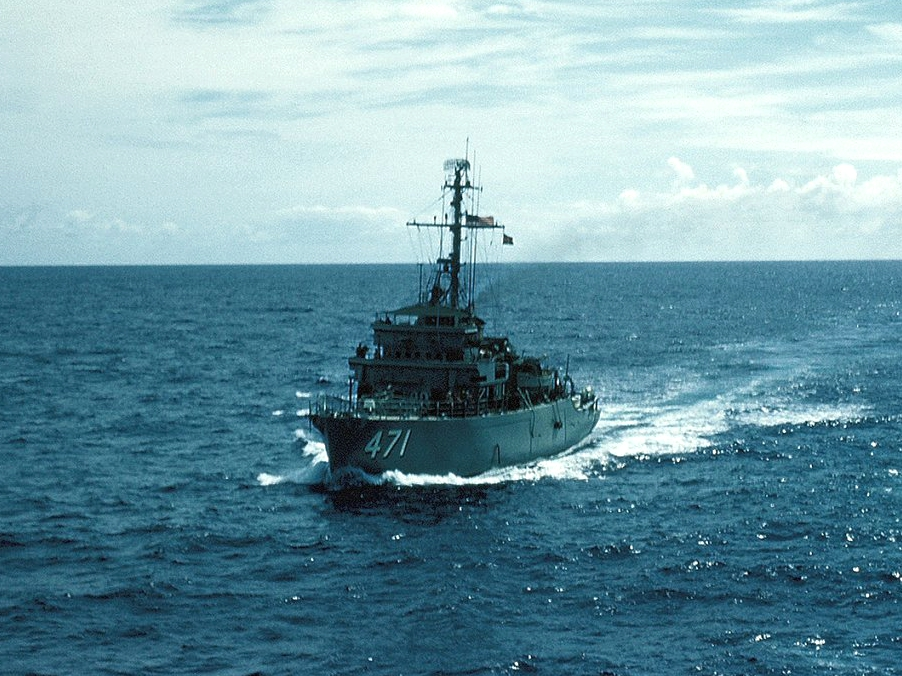
- USS Skill (MSO-471) c. 1960

History

United States
- Name: USS Skill
- Builder: Luders Marine Construction Co., Stamford, Connecticut
- Laid down: 17 August 1953, as AM-471
- Launched: 3 April 1955
- Commissioned: 7 November 1955
- Decommissioned: October 1970
- Reclassified: MSO-471 (Ocean Minesweeper), 7 February 1955
- Fate: Sold for scrapping, 1 April 1979.

General characteristics
- Class & type: Agile-class minesweeper
- Displacement: 630 long tons (640 t) light; 755 long tons (767 t) full load
- Length: 172 ft (52 m)
- Beam: 36 ft (11 m)
- Draft: 10 ft (3 m)
- Propulsion: 4 × Packard ID1700 diesel engines; 2 × shafts; 2 × controllable pitch propellers
- Speed: 15 knots (28 km/h; 17 mph)
- Complement: 6 officers, 74 enlisted
- Armament: 1 × single 40 mm gun mount (later replaced by 1 × twin 20 mm gun mount); 2 × .50 cal (12.7 mm) twin Browning M2 machine guns

USS Skill (MSO-471) was an Agile-class minesweeper acquired by the U.S. Navy for the task of removing mines that had been placed in the water to prevent the safe passage of ships.

Skill was the second U.S. Navy vessel of that name. It was an ocean minesweeper, laid down by Luders Marine Construction Co., Stamford, Connecticut, on 17 August 1953 under the designation AM-471; redesignated MSO-471 on 7 February 1955; launched on 3 April 1955; sponsored by Mrs. John C. Niedermair; and commissioned on 7 November 1955.

== Atlantic Ocean operations ==
Skill conducted shakedown training off the Atlantic coast before reporting for duty with the Mine Force, Atlantic Fleet, at Charleston, South Carolina, on 19 December 1955.

During her 15 years of active service with the Navy, the minesweeper served with the Atlantic and 6th Fleets. She operated out of Charleston throughout her career, when not deployed to the Mediterranean. Skill operated with the 6th Fleet in the "middle sea" in 1956, 1957, 1958, 1960, 1962, 1964, 1966, and 1968. Skill participated in the recovery effort of the 1966 Palomares B-52 crash in early 1966. In late May 1968, during the return voyage from her last Mediterranean deployment, Skill participated in the unsuccessful search for the nuclear submarine, USS Scorpion (SSN-589).

== Decommissioning ==
Skill spent all of 1969 around Charleston, South Carolina, and most of it at the Detyens Shipyard being repaired. Skill was finally decommissioned and placed in reserve in October 1970. She was berthed at Beaumont, Texas, as a unit of the Atlantic Reserve Fleet until sold for scrap by the Defense Reutilization and Marketing Service on 1 April 1979.
