= USS Guide (AM-447) =

Minesweeper of the United States Navy

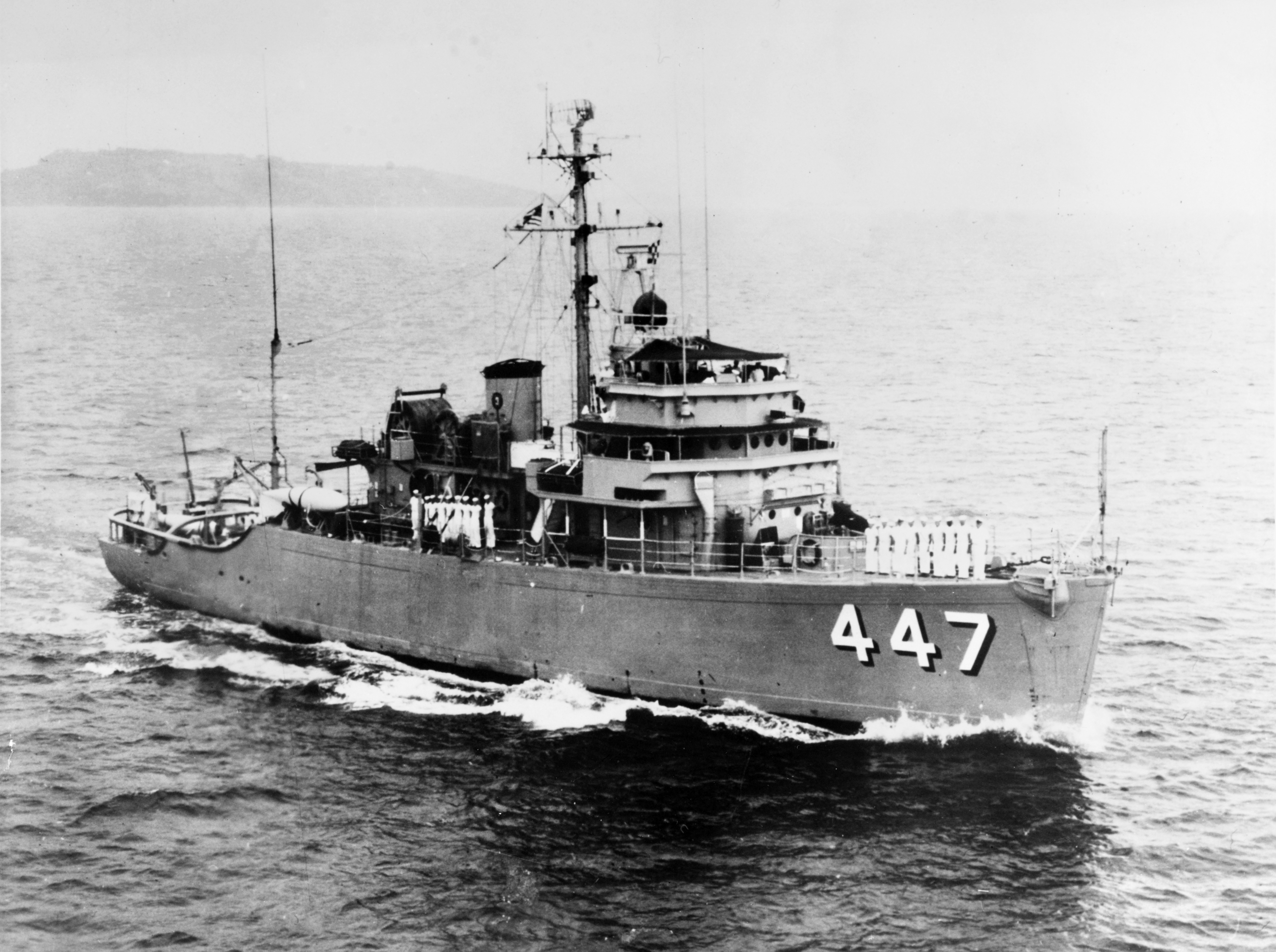
- USS Guide (MSO-447) underway, c. the 1960s

History

United States
- Builder: Seattle Shipbuilding & Drydocking Corp.
- Laid down: 20 February 1953
- Launched: 17 April 1954
- Commissioned: 15 March 1955
- Decommissioned: 9 July 1972
- Stricken: 9 July 1972
- Home port: Long Beach, California
- Fate: fate unknown

General characteristics
- Displacement: 620 tons
- Length: 172 ft (52 m)
- Beam: 36 ft (11 m)
- Draught: 10 ft (3.0 m)
- Speed: 16 knots
- Complement: 74
- Armament: twin 20 mm cannons, one .50 cal (12.7 mm) machine gun, twin .30 cal (7.62 mm) machine guns

USS Guide (AM-447/MSO-447) was an Agile-class minesweeper acquired by the U.S. Navy for the task of removing mines that had been placed in the water to prevent the safe passage of ships.

The second ship to be named Guide by the Navy, AM-447 was launched 17 April 1954 by the Seattle Shipbuilding & Drydocking Corp., Seattle, Washington; sponsored by Miss Ann L. Larson; and commissioned 15 March 1955. Her hull classification changed from AM-447 to MSO-447 on 7 February 1955.

== West Coast operations ==
Guide spent the first year of her career in coastwise operations off California. This duty included surveys for the Navy Hydrographic Office in the San Diego-Long Beach area and in San Francisco Bay approaches. She departed Long Beach, California, 1 October 1956 and arrived in Yokosuka 31 October for minesweeping exercises that took her off the coast of Korea, the Marianas Islands, and along the coast of Japan. She returned to Long Beach 15 April for 2 years of training along the western seaboard. On 2 April 1959 she again deployed for the Far East, expanding duties to include joint mine exercises with the naval forces of Japan, Korea and Nationalist China.

Guide returned to Long Beach from her second Asian tour 15 October 1959 and resumed operations along the California seaboard for the next 2 years. On 1 May 1961 she sailed on her third tour of duty with the U.S. 7th Fleet, arriving in Yokosuka, Japan, 29 May 1961. Following amphibious and other mine warfare exercises to the coasts of Korea and the Philippines, she returned to Long Beach 14 November. The next 16 months were filled with mine countermeasure and minesweeping training that took her as far north as Seattle and Esquimalt, British Columbia.

== Continued Far East operations ==
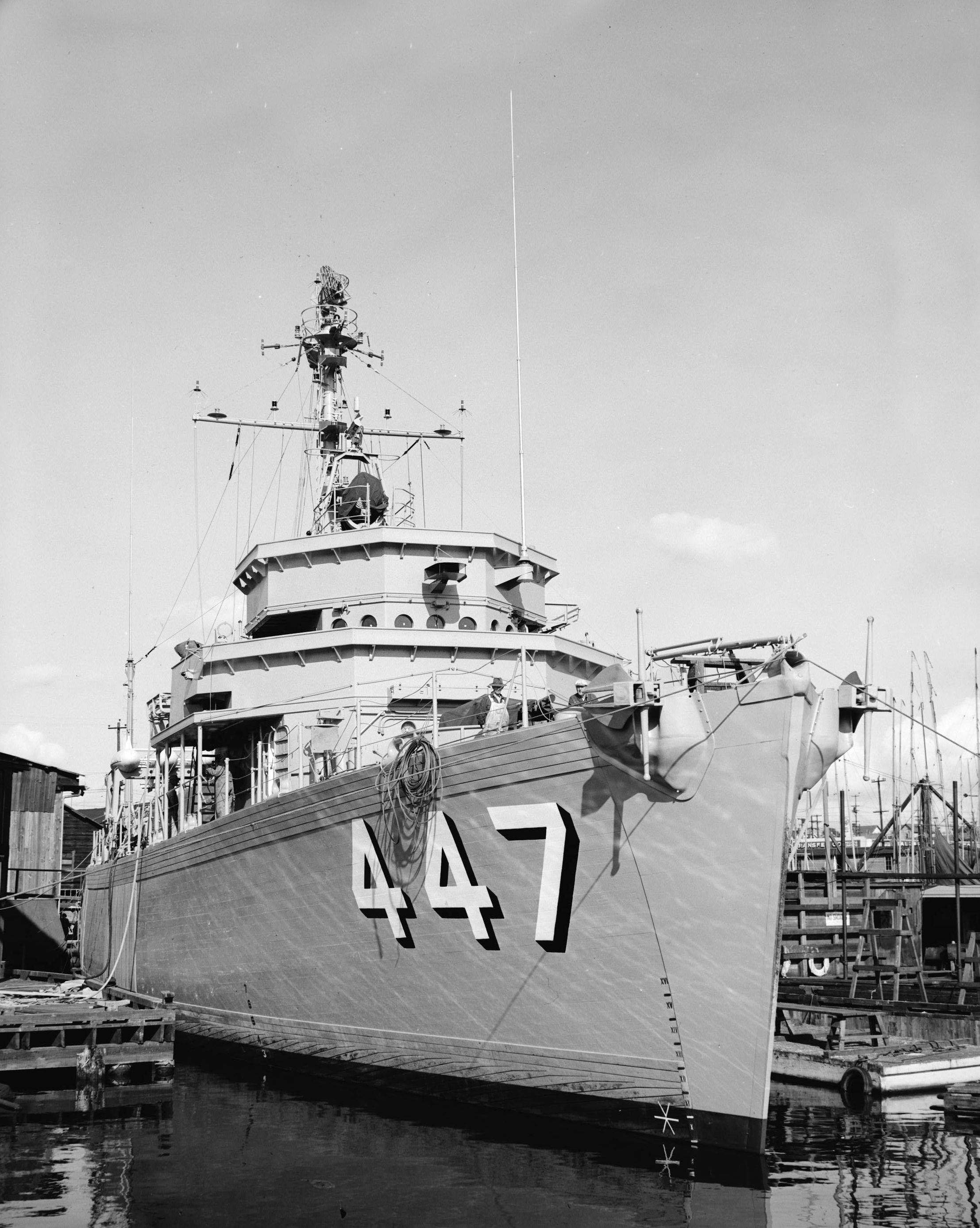
Guide in 1954.

Guide was again underway for the Far East 5 April 1963, touching Midway Island and the Marianas on her way to Japan. She again swept to the shores of Taiwan, Korea, and the Philippines before returning to Long Beach 5 November 1963. Coastwise training occupied her until 5 April 1965 when she sailed for Guam, Marianas Islands, arriving 3 May 1965.

== Supporting Vietnam crisis operations ==
Guide underwent a 3-week upkeep period at Guam. She arrived off the coast of Vietnam 1 June to begin the first of three periods of "Operation Market Time" anti-infiltration patrols to deny movement of war supplies to the Viet Cong. Her first patrol terminated 30 June. Subsequent patrols were carried out 25 July-12 August 1965 and 18 September-5 October 1965. Following a liberty call at Hong Kong, she paid a 2-day visit to Iloilo City, Panay, Republic of the Philippines. She opened for general visiting 25–28 October and contributed books and food to assist in America's people-to-people program of international friendship.

The Guide returned to the waters off Viet Nam for additional patrols in late 1969 and early 1970. While on patrol the ship and crew engaged the enemy in a ship-to-shore fire-fight that resulted in the crewmembers being awarded the Combat Action Medal.

== Joint naval exercises in the Philippines ==
Guide joined in combined mine warfare exercises with units of the Philippine Navy before setting course for the Marshalls, Hawaii, and back to Long Beach, arriving 14 December 1965. The minesweeper operated along the U.S. West Coast throughout 1966 and sailed for the Far East early in 1967. On 1 March she was off the coast of Vietnam laboring to keep clear the shipping lanes which supply Allied fighters in that war-torn land. She continued to perform this vital duty past mid-year, reaffirming her right to the proud name Guide.

== Final status ==
Guide was struck from the Navy list on 9 July 1972. Her fate is uncertain: she was either sold to Spain 1 January 1973 or sold for scrapping on 27 January 1974 in California.
