= USS Agile (MSO-421) =

Minesweeper of the United States Navy

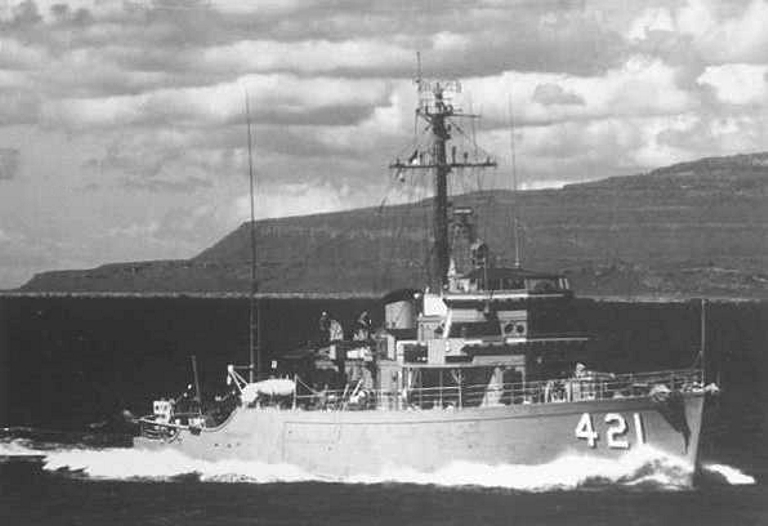

History

United States
- Name: Agile
- Laid down: 22 February 1954
- Launched: 19 November 1955
- Commissioned: 21 June 1956
- Decommissioned: 28 July 1972
- Stricken: September 1977
- Fate: Sold in 1980 for scrapping

General characteristics
- Displacement: 755 tons
- Length: 172 ft (52 m)
- Beam: 35 ft (11 m)
- Draught: 10 ft (3.0 m)
- Speed: 14 knots
- Complement: 78
- Armament: one 40 mm gun mount., two .50 cal (12.7 mm) machine guns

USS Agile (MSO-421) was an Agile-class minesweeper acquired by the U.S. Navy for the dangerous task of removing mines from minefields laid in the water to prevent ships from passing.

Agile was laid down on 22 February 1954 at Stamford, Connecticut, by the Luders Marine Construction Co. as AM-421; redesignated MSO-421 on 7 February 1955; launched on 19 November 1955; sponsored by Mrs. Alice Donohue; and commissioned at the New York Naval Shipyard on 21 June 1956.

== Initial training period ==
The non-magnetic ocean minesweeper completed fitting out at New York and then sailed on 13 July for her home port, Charleston, South Carolina. She remained there for about two weeks before getting underway on 31 July for her shakedown training. Agile operated out of Guantanamo Bay, Cuba, between 8 August and 6 September and returned to Charleston on the 10th of the latter month. Type training and post-shakedown availability at the Charleston Naval Shipyard followed. The beginning of 1957 found her still at Charleston, but preparing to embark upon her first deployment to the Mediterranean Sea.

== First Atlantic crossing ==
Agile began her first Atlantic Ocean crossing on 12 February 1957, transited the Strait of Gibraltar on the 26th and cruised with the U.S. 6th Fleet for three months. During that time, the ship participated in two amphibious exercises and visited several Mediterranean ports. Among her ports of call were Patras and Athens on the Greek mainland; the Greek islands of Samos, Rhodes, and Crete and Cannes, France. The crisis in Jordan in April kept her in the eastern portion of the Mediterranean for most of her first deployment. After turnover at Rhodes, Agile began the long voyage home on 25 May; and she re-entered Charleston with her division mates on 16 June.

Post-deployment leave and upkeep occupied the ensuing five weeks. On 26 July, the minesweeper got underway for Little Creek, Virginia, to participate in harbor defense and minesweeping exercises. However, damage to her propeller forced her into repairs at the Newport News Shipbuilding & Dry Dock Co. and precluded her participation in the exercises. The repairs ended on 25 September, and the warship departed Newport News, Virginia, that same day. Returning to Charleston five days later, she spent the bulk of October conducting acoustic trials out of her home port.

== Engaged in testing ==
On 26 October the minesweeper stood out of Charleston on her way to Panama City, Florida, where she reported on the 31st for duty with the Mine Defense Laboratory. She assisted the laboratory in the conduct of special mine defense tests for five weeks completed that service on 5 December 1957, and headed back to Charleston. December brought the usual year's-end holiday leave period. The New Year, 1958, began with a two-week availability alongside a tender February saw Agile pass her final acceptance trials and an operational readiness inspection. On 17 February the minesweeper entered the Charleston Naval Shipyard for regular overhaul. She completed repairs by June and began duty with the shipyard testing propeller blades. During July and August, the warship conducted refresher and type training. September brought preparations for overseas movement.

== Second Med cruise ==
Agile put to sea on 29 September 1958, bound for her second tour of duty with the U.S. 6th Fleet. Port calls and exercises - notably an amphibious landing exercise carried out on the southern coast of Sardinia highlighted that deployment in the Mediterranean. She passed through the Strait of Gibraltar on 26 January 1959 and began the return voyage to the United States. En route home, the warship made a brief stop at Bermuda before re-entering Charleston on 11 February. Between the time of her return and the beginning of summer, the warship carried out tests and conducted minesweeping operations out of Charleston. By the beginning of the second week in August, she was working with the Mine Warfare School as a training platform. That service lasted until she began her holiday leave period in December 1959

== 1960 NATO exercises ==
The minesweeper entered the Charleston Naval Shipyard on 29 January 1960 and began a regular overhaul. She completed overhaul on 5 April and, the following month, conducted postoverhaul refresher training and minesweeping exercises. On 28 June, Agile joined her division mates in deploying to the West Indies. After a round of port visits and exercises, she returned to Charleston on 13 September. Later that month, the minesweeper moved north to Nova Scotia where she participated in Operation Sweepclear V, a NATO minesweeping exercise. Atlantic coast operations continued into 1961 when she began preparations for her third deployment to the Mediterranean.

Agile departed Charleston on 10 April 1961 in company with the other ships of her division. They arrived at Rota, Spain, on 25 April and took on fuel before entering the Mediterranean. For the next five months' Agile plied the waters of the "middle sea" showing the flag and honing her combat skills. She participated in two 6th Fleet amphibious exercises as well as the NATO Exercise "Checkmate". She and her division mates were relieved at Pollença Bay, Mallorca, on 28 September and began the long voyage home. The return passage ended at Charleston on 14 October.

== 1962 Caribbean operations ==
Following post-deployment stand down, the minesweeper entered the Charleston Naval Shipyard in mid-November for regular overhaul. She left the shipyard in January 1962 and after refresher training, resumed operations out of Charleston with the Atlantic Fleet Mine Force. Until the beginning of May Agile conducted independent ship's exercises, type training, and training missions for the Mine Warfare School. On 2 May, she departed Charleston, bound for Panama City, Florida. For a little more than a month, the warship performed service in support of experiments and tests conducted by the Naval mine Defense Laboratory. She returned to Charleston on 8 June, began preparations for a deployment to the West Indies, and embarked upon that assignment on 20 July. The minesweeper made port visits participated in an amphibious exercise at Vieques Island, and joined other American ships off Haiti for a show of force during another of that country's frequent periods of internal disorder.

== 1963 NATO exercises ==
Agile returned to Charleston on 9 November, underwent two weeks of repairs alongside a tender, and then finished out the year with post-deployment stand down followed by holiday leave and upkeep. On 8 January 1963, she put to sea for a fleet service mine test which ended on the 25th. At that point, the ship resumed normal operations out of Charleston, providing services to the Mine Warfare School as well as conducting the usual independent ship's exercises and type training. Between 4 and 25 May, she participated in the NATO Exercise "Sweepclear VIII", in the vicinity of Mayport, Florida. Six weeks of local operations out of Charleston followed. On 5 July, the minesweeper departed her home port once again, bound for Little Creek, Virginia, where she provided services to the Operational Test and Evaluation Force. She returned to Charleston on 25 July and, after a two-week tender availability, resumed local operations. On 29 October, the vessel entered the yard at the Charleston Drydock & Shipbuilding Co. for a two-month overhaul.

== 1964 Med cruise ==
The warship completed the repair period on 3 January 1964 Local operations and refresher training filled her time until the last week in March. Beginning on 22 March she spent three weeks as a school ship for the Mine Warfare School. Following that duty, the ship once more began preparations to deploy to the Mediterranean. She departed Charleston on 15 May and reported in at Málaga, Spain, on 3 June. In addition to the usual exercises and port visits, Agile participated in a cruise to northern Europe. She left the Mediterranean on 17 July and visited ports in England, Germany, Denmark, Belgium, and France. the minesweeper retransited the Strait of Gibraltar on 17 September and resumed duty with the 6th Fleet. Relieved of duty at Huelva, Spain, she headed back to the United States on 29 October. Agile arrived back in Charleston on 17 November and began a post-deployment tender availability that lasted a month. The remainder of the year brought holiday leave and upkeep

== Final services to the fleet ==
The 1964 Mediterranean cruise proved to be the last of her career. During the remainder of her active service, some seven years and six months, Agile served in waters near North America. She deployed to the West Indies and to the Gulf of Mexico several times but, otherwise, conducted local operations out of Charleston. At various times, the minesweeper served as a school ship for the Mine Warfare School and as a test platform for both the Mine Defense Laboratory at Panama City, Florida, and the Naval Ordnance Facility at Fort Lauderdale, Florida. In between those special assignments, the warship engaged in independent ship's exercises and type training.

== Decommissioning ==
Those activities came to an end, however, on 28 July 1972 when Agile was placed out of commission at Charleston. Later that year she was moved to a permanent berthing area with the Norfolk Group, Atlantic Reserve Fleet. There she remained for more than seven years. Her name was struck from the Naval Vessel Register in September 1977, and she was sold to the Union Minerals & Alloys Corp. in February 1980 for scrapping.
