= USS Exultant (AM-441) =

Minesweeper of the United States Navy

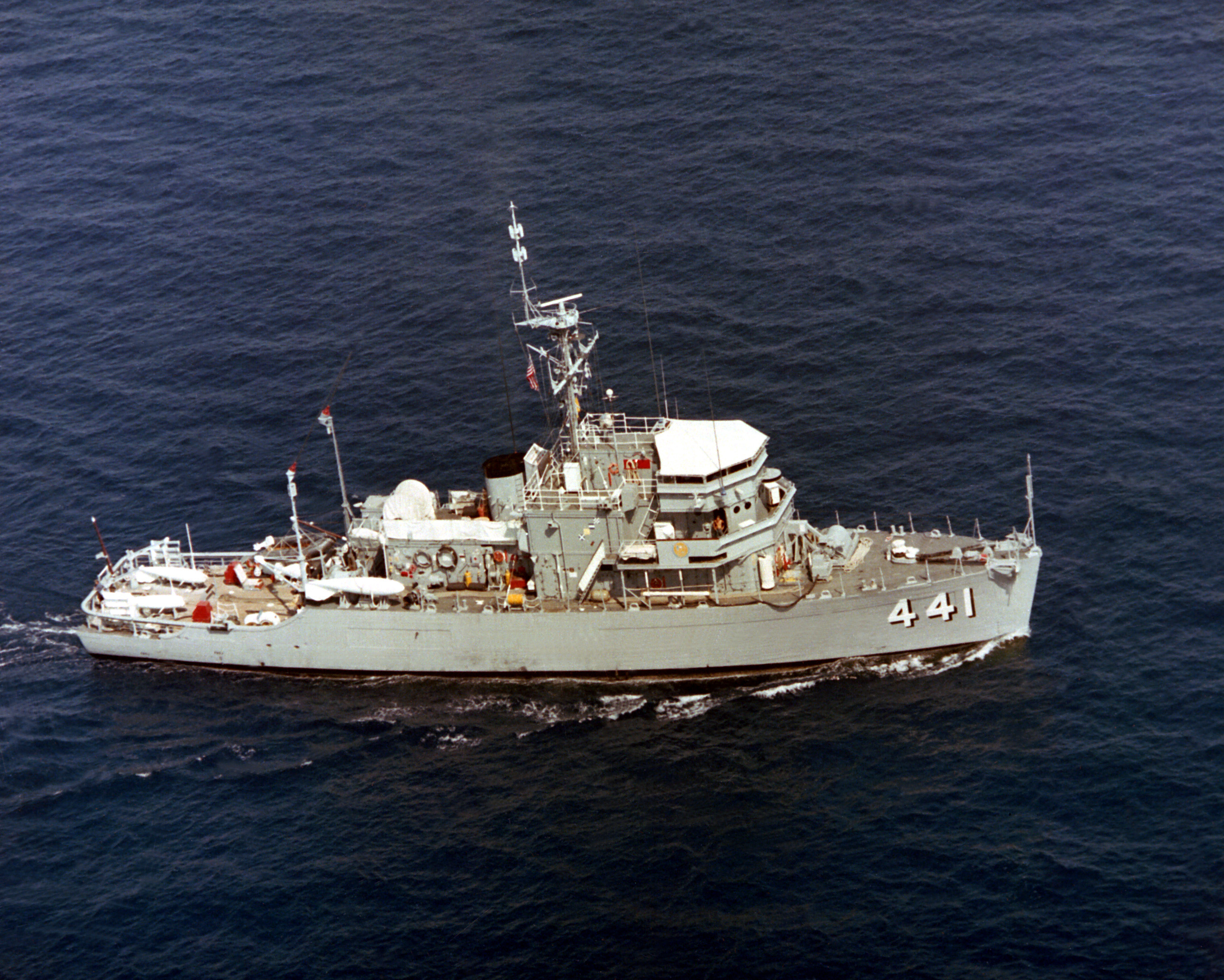
- Exultant underway c. 1983

History

United States
- Builder: Higgins, Inc., New Orleans, Louisiana
- Laid down: 22 May 1952
- Launched: 6 June 1953
- Commissioned: 22 June 1954
- Decommissioned: 30 June 1993
- Reclassified: MSO-441 on 7 February 1955
- Stricken: 9 March 1994
- Home port: Charleston, South Carolina
- Fate: Scrapped, 2000

General characteristics
- Class & type: Aggressive-class minesweeper
- Displacement: 620 tons
- Length: 172 ft (52.43 m)
- Beam: 36 ft (10.97 m)
- Draught: 10 ft (3.05 m)
- Propulsion: Four Packard ID1700 diesel engines, two shafts, two controllable pitch propellers
- Speed: 16 knots
- Complement: 74
- Armament: one 40 mm mount

USS Exultant (AM-441/MSO-441) was an Aggressive-class minesweeper acquired by the U.S. Navy for the task of removing mines that had been placed in the water to prevent the safe passage of ships.

The second ship to be named Exultant by the Navy, AM-441 was launched 6 June 1953 by Higgins, Inc., New Orleans, Louisiana; sponsored by Miss A. Brooks, and commissioned 22 June 1954. She was reclassified MSO-441 on 7 February 1955.

== East Coast operations ==
Exultant first tied up at Charleston, South Carolina, her home port and headquarters for the Mine Force, Atlantic Fleet, 23 July 1954. Along with the coastwise training operations vital to maintaining her readiness, she cruised to the Mediterranean to serve with the U.S. 6th Fleet in 1955, 1957–1958, and 1959-1960 & 1963. During all of these tours of duty, she exercised with ships of other NATO navies, joined in fleet operations, and visited a large variety of Mediterranean ports.

In both 1956 and 1957, Exultant spent a month in northern waters, in 1956 exercising with minesweepers of the Royal Canadian Navy out of Halifax, Nova Scotia, and in 1957, participating in cold weather sweeping operations out of Argentia, Newfoundland. Her other activities through July 1960 included fleet operations in the Caribbean, as well as individual training there, amphibious exercises on the beaches of North Carolina, and participation in experimental operations in the development of mine warfare.

== Exultant catches on fire with loss of life ==
On 12 August 1960, while underway off the U.S. East Coast, Exultant suffered extensive interior damage from a flash fire in her engineering spaces. Valiant performance of duty by the minesweeper's damage control parties, and gallant help from USS Nimble (MSO-459) extinguished the flames and enabled Exultant to return safely to port. Five of Exultant's crew lost their lives in the blaze.

== Final status ==
Exultant decommissioned 30 June 1993 and was stricken from the Navy list on 9 March 1994. Exultant was sold for scrapping in 2000.
