= USS Sturdy (MSO-494) =

Minesweeper of the United States Navy

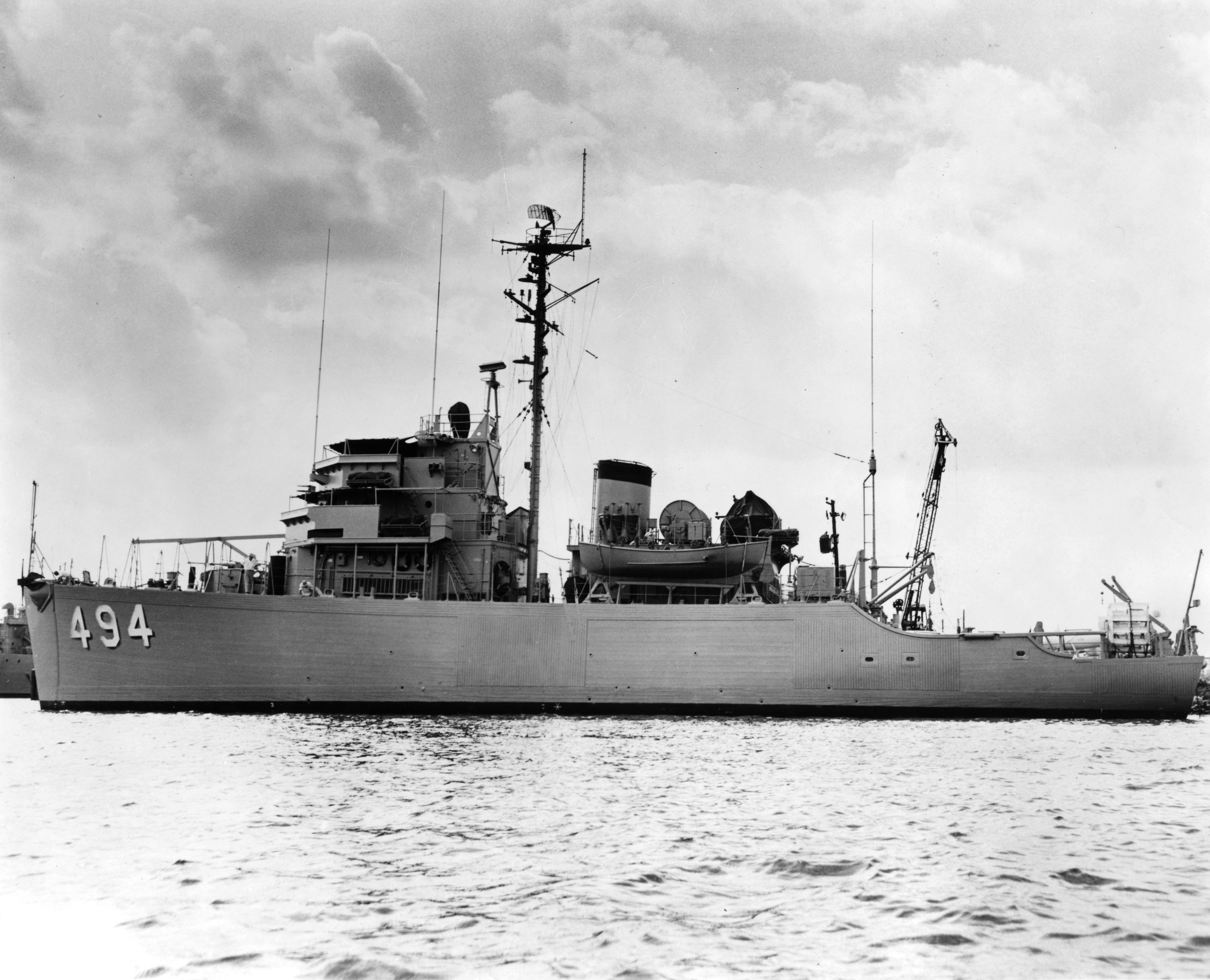
- USS Sturdy (MSO-494) in 1957

History

United States
- Laid down: 15 October 1954
- Launched: 28 January 1956
- Commissioned: 23 October 1957
- Decommissioned: 1 July 1972
- Stricken: 1 September 1977
- Home port: Charleston, South Carolina
- Fate: Scrapped, 1987

General characteristics
- Displacement: 775 tons (full load)
- Length: 172 ft (52 m)
- Beam: 36 ft (11 m)
- Draught: 10 ft (3.0 m)
- Speed: 15 knots
- Complement: 74
- Armament: one 40 mm mount

USS Sturdy (MSO-494) was an Agile-class minesweeper acquired by the United States Navy for the task of removing mines that had been placed in the water to prevent the safe passage of ships.

The third ship to be named Sturdy by the Navy, MSO-494 was laid down on 15 October 1954 by Broward Marine Inc., Fort Lauderdale, Florida; launched on 28 January 1956; sponsored by Mrs. Francis P. Whitehair; and commissioned on 23 October 1957.

== East Coast operations ==
Sturdy joined the Mine Force, Atlantic Fleet, at Charleston, South Carolina, on 13 November 1957 and completed fitting out and sea trials. She held her shakedown cruise in January and February 1958 off Guantánamo Bay, Cuba. Upon returning to Charleston, she operated from there until January 1959 when she was deployed to the Mediterranean as a unit of the U.S. 6th Fleet. She participated in various exercises with fleet units of the North Atlantic Treaty Organization countries and visited ports in Spain, France, Italy, Corsica, Malta, and Gibraltar, before returning to her homeport on 30 May 1959.

== Second tour with the U.S. Sixth Fleet ==
Sturdy conducted training exercises and test operations along the coast until early September when she deployed to the Caribbean. She returned to Charleston on 7 December 1960 and operated from there to the Caribbean for the next 10 months. The minesweeper stood out of Charleston on 11 September 1961 for her second tour with the U.S. 6th Fleet which ended on 24 March 1962.

== Supporting the U.S. space program ==
In May 1962 she participated in an exercise off North Carolina and then moved south off Cape Canaveral, Florida, to join the recovery forces for Lt. Comdr. Scott Carpenter's space shot on 24 June 1962. Sturdy proceeded to Panama City, Fla where she was outfitted with the US Navy's first towed Side Scan Sonar. From there she proceeded up the East Coast to Boston, testing the equipment over all types of bottom conditions to test and evaluate the new sonar. After returning to Charleston for an INSURV Inspection, she proceeded to Savannah Machine & Foundry Co., for a repair-yard period from 20 August to 23 October 1962. Sturdy returned to the Side-scan testing operation and to providing services to the Mine-Warfare School in Charleston, SC until 19 March 1963, when she was deployed with her side-scan sonar to the waters South West of Bermuda where fishermen had snagged 22 German World War II submarine laid mines. After a week of no-luck, Sturdy's XO visited the fisherman and discovered his compass faulty. After calibrating the compass for them, Sturdy returned to the new site and located the mines within 2 days, destroying all of them.

Sturdy was deployed to the Caribbean with her mine division 44 from 29 May through 18 October 1963. This cruise was essentially the Navy's clean-up effort after the Cuban Missile Crisis. The 4 ships alternated providing surveillance in the Windward Passage between Haiti and Cuba. Sturdy was credited with identifying one Russian Komar Class Torpedo ship proceeding at high speed from Haiti to Cuba. Upon return to Charleston and a much needed Tender Availability, Sturdy joined USS Swerve on a surveillance cruise to justify President Kennedy's Military Assistance Program for Central America. During this cruise we experienced being at DEFCONONE FOR 24 hours when President Kennedy was assassinated, the cruise ended on 8 December 1963. Sturdy was awarded the Battle Efficiency "E" for the fiscal year 1963. Sturdy conducted tests, operations, and exercises along the eastern seaboard of the United States and in the Caribbean for the next seven years.

On 21 March 1965, the "Sturdy" left Charleston, SC for Cape Kennedy to participate in the Gemini III manned space launch. The "Sturdy" was just off the coast that day, 25 March 1965, near the launch pad in case there was an abort within the first few seconds. She had a team of navy divers (frogmen) on board along with their equipment. It was an incredible experience to see how quickly the rocket lifted off and was out of sight within only a few seconds. At that time, the "Sturdy" set its course back to Charleston. The "Sturdy" was awarded the Battle Efficiency "E" after an extremely high score on the mine field off the Charleston coast. The mine field contained various types of mines, bottom, suspended, acoustic, pressure, etc. The ship maneuvered back and forth across the field detecting as many mines as possible by its high resolution sonar system. Many passes resulted in detecting the same mines multiple times at multiple locations on the field. This led to the high score. The sonarmen and radarmen plotted across the field each detection.

== Decommissioning ==
On 28 September 1970, the crew of Sturdy was notified that she was to be decommissioned. The inactivation process was begun on 1 October 1970 and on 1 July 1972 the ship was decommissioned at Charleston. Sturdy was towed to Norfolk, Virginia, by USS Salinan (ATF-161) and placed in the Inactive Ship Facility there.

Sturdy was decommissioned on 1 July 1972 and struck from the Navy Directory on 1 September 1977. She was sold for scrapping for the sum of $27,000 in 1987.
