= USS Nimble (AM-459) =

Minesweeper of the United States Navy

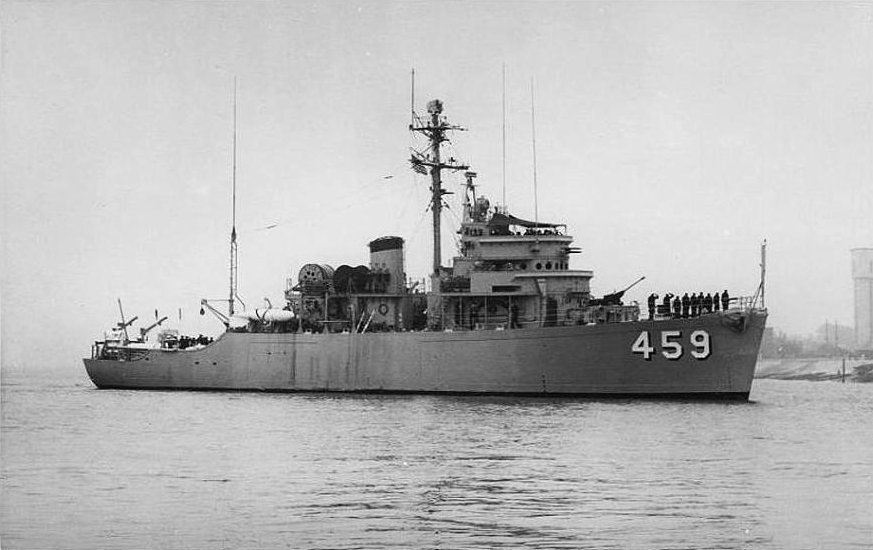

History

United States
- Laid down: 27 April 1953
- Launched: 6 August 1954
- Commissioned: 11 May 1955
- Decommissioned: 24 November 1970
- Stricken: 1 November 1976
- Home port: Charleston, South Carolina
- Fate: Sold for scrapping 1 June 1981

General characteristics
- Displacement: 775 tons
- Length: 172 ft (52 m)
- Beam: 36 ft (11 m)
- Draft: 10 ft (3.0 m)
- Speed: 15 knots
- Complement: 65
- Armament: one 40 mm mount

USS Nimble (AM-459/MSO-459) was an Agile-class minesweeper in service with the United States Navy from 1955 to 1970. She was sold for scrap in 1981.

== History ==
The second warship to be named Nimble by the Navy, MSO-459 was laid down as AM-459, 27 April 1953 by Higgins, Inc., New Orleans, Louisiana; launched 6 August 1954 sponsored by Miss Helen M. Wakeman; reclassified MSO-459 on 7 February 1955; and commissioned 11 May 1955.

=== East Coast operations ===
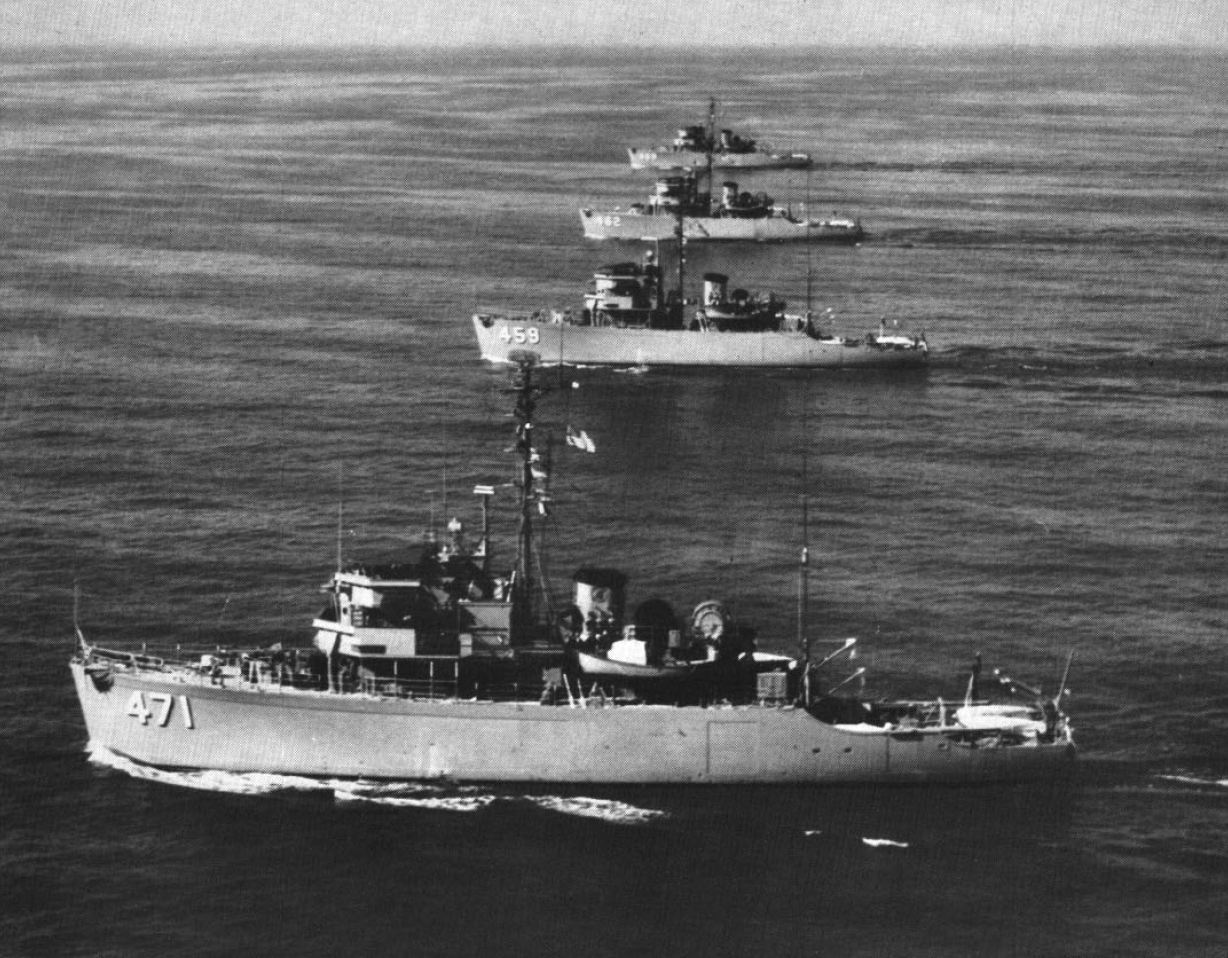
Nimble (second closest) executing coordinated movements in training

Nimble, a non-magnetic minesweeper of laminated wood construction, reported for duty with Mine Force, Atlantic Fleet, at New Orleans, 2 June 1955 and departed for her homeport, Charleston, South Carolina. From Charleston, she continued on to Narragansett Bay for shakedown, thence to Key West, Florida, and Little Creek, Virginia, for various training exercises to enable her to sweep magnetic, contact, acoustic and pressure sea mines.

=== First European deployment ===
Until September 1956 Nimble was employed in operations in the 6th Naval District. On the 4th of that month, she departed the South Carolina coast for her first European deployment. Steaming to the North Sea, she participated in NATO exercises, then sailed to the Mediterranean to serve in the U.S. 6th Fleet until 22 February 1957. Beginning with that deployment, Nimble steamed to the Mediterranean for six months duty with the 6th Fleet on a bi-yearly basis until 1964. Breaking that pattern in that year, she resumed it in 1965, and has continued to follow it into 1970. Nimble participated in the recovery effort of the 1966 Palomares B-52 crash.

=== Supporting NATO exercises and other operations ===
On her 6th Fleet deployments she has participated in NATO and fleet exercises; while her U.S. 2nd Fleet duties have brought regular Caribbean operations as well as U.S. East Coast exercises including NATO maneuvers. While on the east coast she has also provided services for the Mine Warfare School, the Fleet Sonar School and the Mine Defense Laboratory.

=== Decommissioning ===
Nimble was decommissioned on 24 November 1970, stricken 1 November 1976 and sold for scrapping 1 June 1981.
