= MinDiv =

MinDiv was a standard U.S. Navy abbreviation or acronym for "Minesweeper Division."

The Commander of a minesweeper division is known, in official Navy communications, as COMMINDIV (followed by a number), such as COMMINDIV EIGHT.

== See also ==
- Minesweeper (ship)
