= Aggressive-class minesweeper =

US built ocean minesweepers

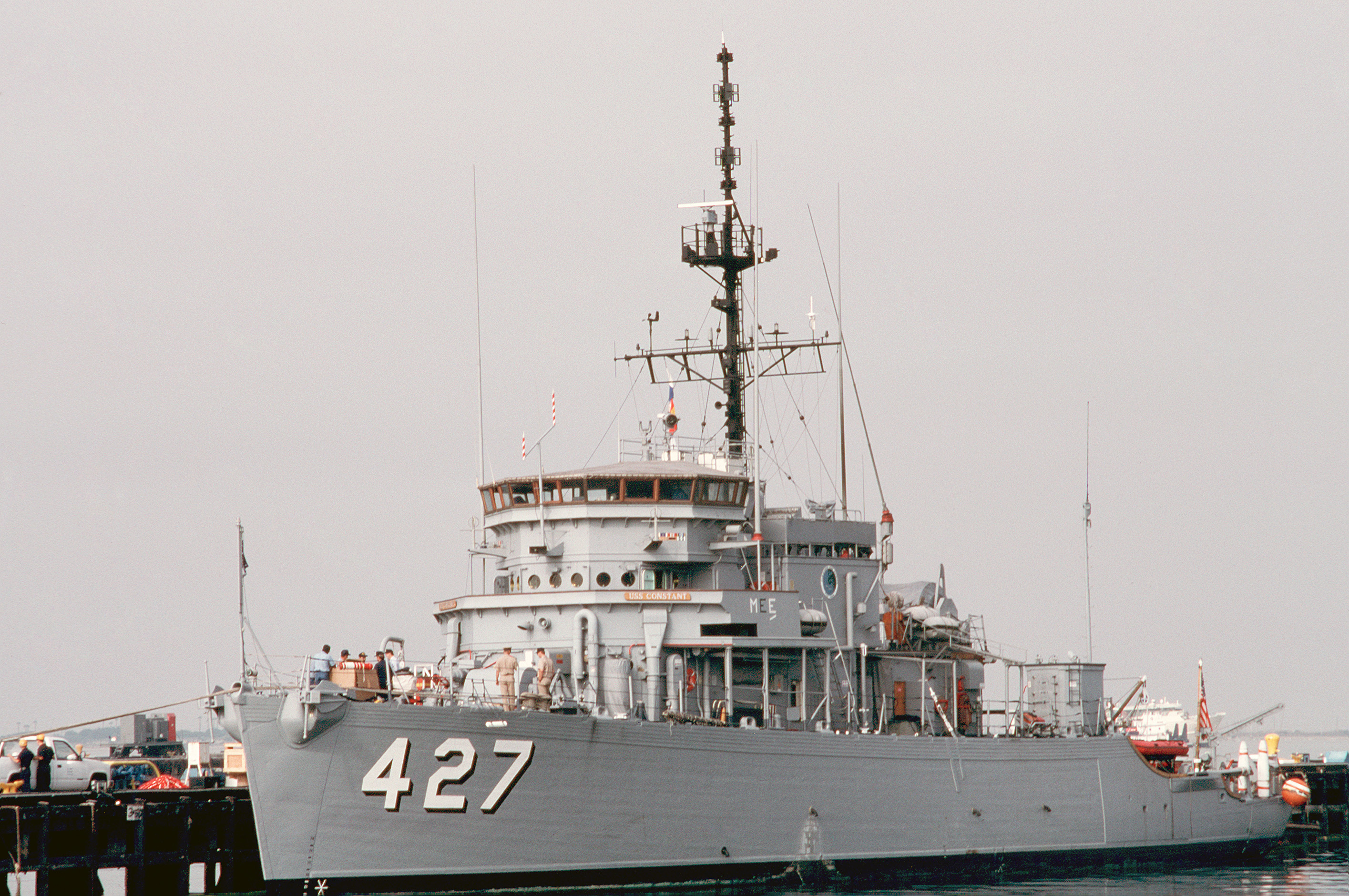
- USS Constant (MSO-427) in 1988

Class overview
- Name: Aggressive class
- Operators: United States Navy; Republic of China Navy; Belgian Navy; Royal Norwegian Navy; Royal Netherlands Navy; Philippine Navy
- Subclasses: Onversaagd class
- In commission: 1953–2025
- Completed: 53
- Retired: 53
- Preserved: 1, USS Lucid

General characteristics
- Type: Minesweeper
- Displacement: 853 tons (full load)
- Length: 172 ft (52 m)
- Beam: 35 ft (11 m)
- Draft: 10 ft (3 m)
- Propulsion: 4 × aluminum block Waukesha diesels, 2,400 bhp (1,800 kW); 2 × shafts; 2 × controllable pitch propellers
- Speed: 14 knots (26 km/h; 16 mph)
- Complement: 7 officers, 70 enlisted
- Sensors & processing systems: AN/SQQ-14 mine hunting sonar
- Armament: 1 × twin 20 mm gun; 2 × .50 cal (12.7 mm) twin machine guns

The Aggressive-class minesweepers are a class of US-built minesweepers. They are designated as MSO (Mine Sweeper Ocean), distinguishing them from the smaller coastal MSCs and inshore MSIs. Besides the US Navy, this class of vessels has also been used by the Belgian Navy and the Norwegian Navy, among others.

== Background ==
Minesweeping, or the disposal of naval mines, by these vessels is performed in different ways:

- Sweeping proper, with an underwater cable cutting the mooring cables of moored mines. The mines then come to the surface and are destroyed by gunfire.
- Acoustic sweeping, with a towed device producing noise to trigger acoustic mines.
- Magnetic sweeping, with a towed device producing a magnetic field to trigger magnetic mines. To protect the minesweeper itself against magnetic mines, the hull and superstructure of the ship are made of wood. Other components are made of non-magnetic materials, and any magnetic materials are strictly controlled.

== Construction and disposition ==
Of the 53 constructed for the United States Navy, 10 were built at Higgins Corp., New Orleans, Louisiana, 9 at J.M. Martinac Shipbuilding Corp., Tacoma, Washington, 8 at Wilmington Boat Works Inc., Wilmington, California, 6 at Luders Marine Construction Co. of Stamford, Connecticut, 4 at Broward Marine Inc, Fort Lauderdale, Florida, 4 at Martinolich Shipbuilding Co., San Diego, California, 3 at Burger Boat Company, Manitowoc, Wisconsin, 3 at Colberg Boat Works, Stockton, California, 2 at Fulton Shipyard, Antioch, California, 2 at Norfolk Naval Shipyard and 2 at Seattle Shipbuilding and Drydocking Co., Seattle, Washington.

33 of the class were decommissioned before the mid-1970s. Four ex-USN ships were sold to the Republic of China Navy 1994 and re-classed as Yung Yang-class minesweepers. USS Implicit was decommissioned 30 September 1994 in Tacoma, Washington and was the last Aggressive-class minesweeper in US Navy active service. On July 1st, 2025, the last Agile-class minesweeper, ROCS Yung Yang, the same minesweeper that was the last to retire from the US Navy, was officially decommissioned from Taiwan Navy service.

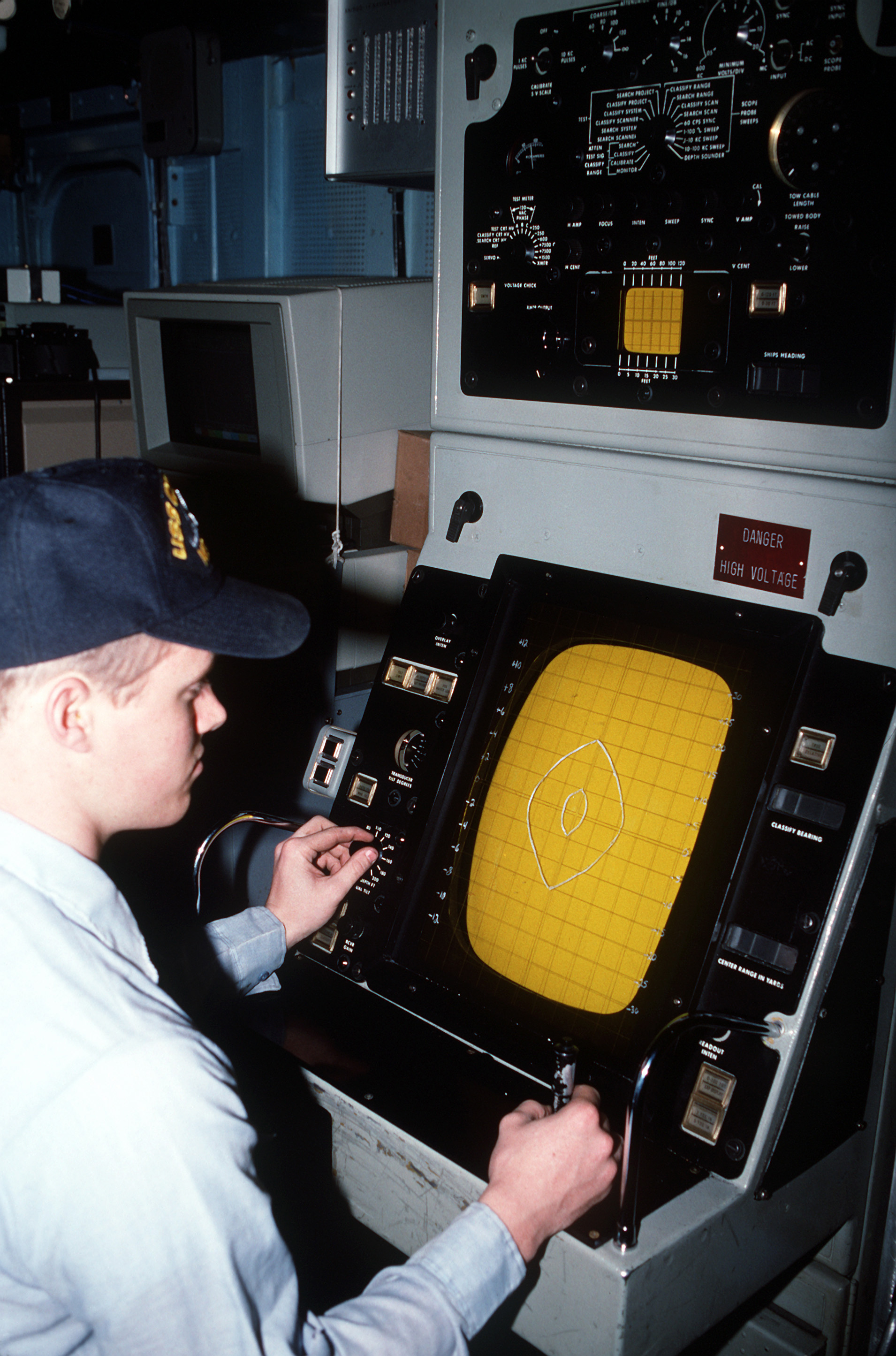
A crewman monitors a mine detection and classification sonar console aboard the ocean minesweeper USS Conquest

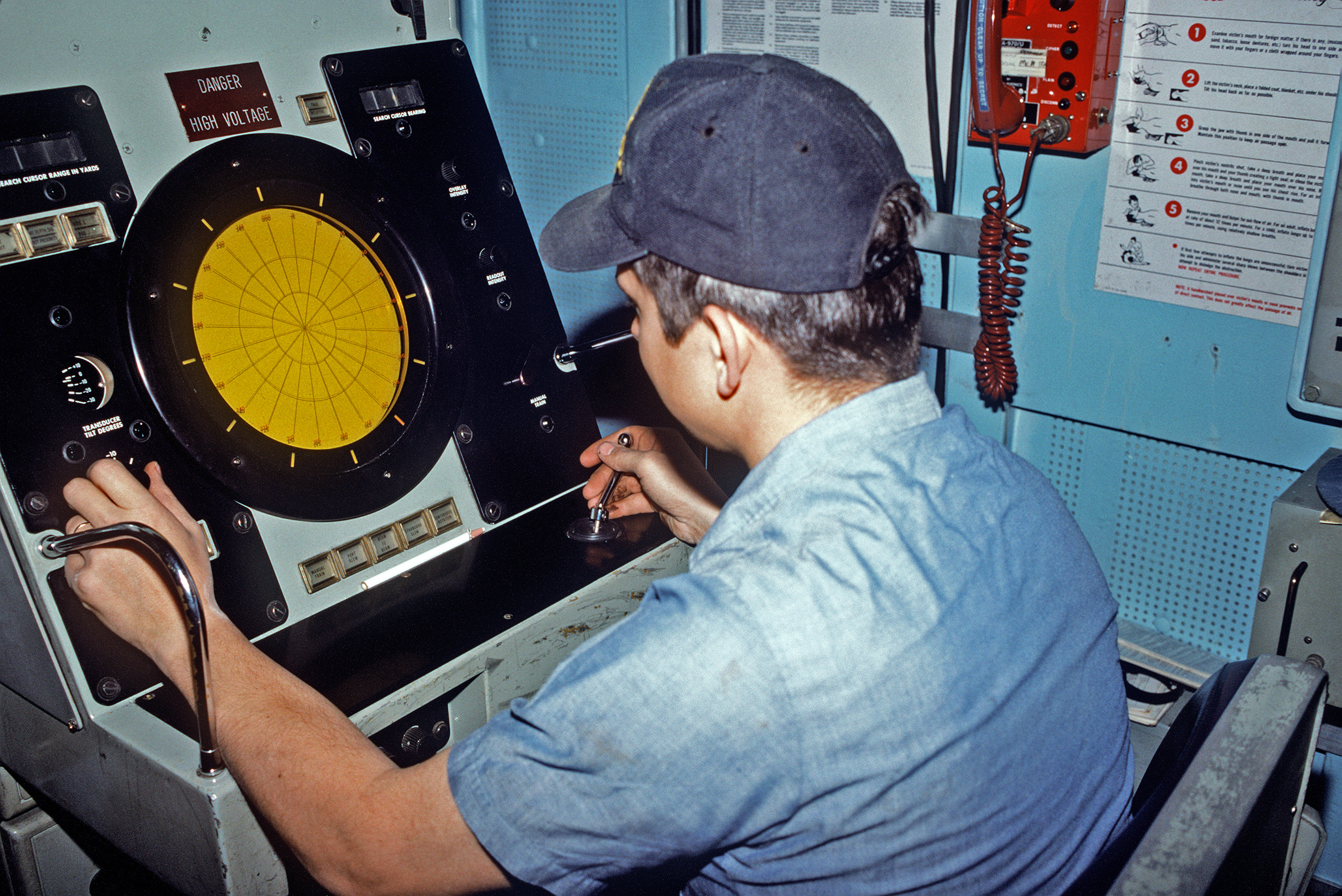
A crewman monitors a mine detection and classification console aboard the ocean minesweeper USS Conquest

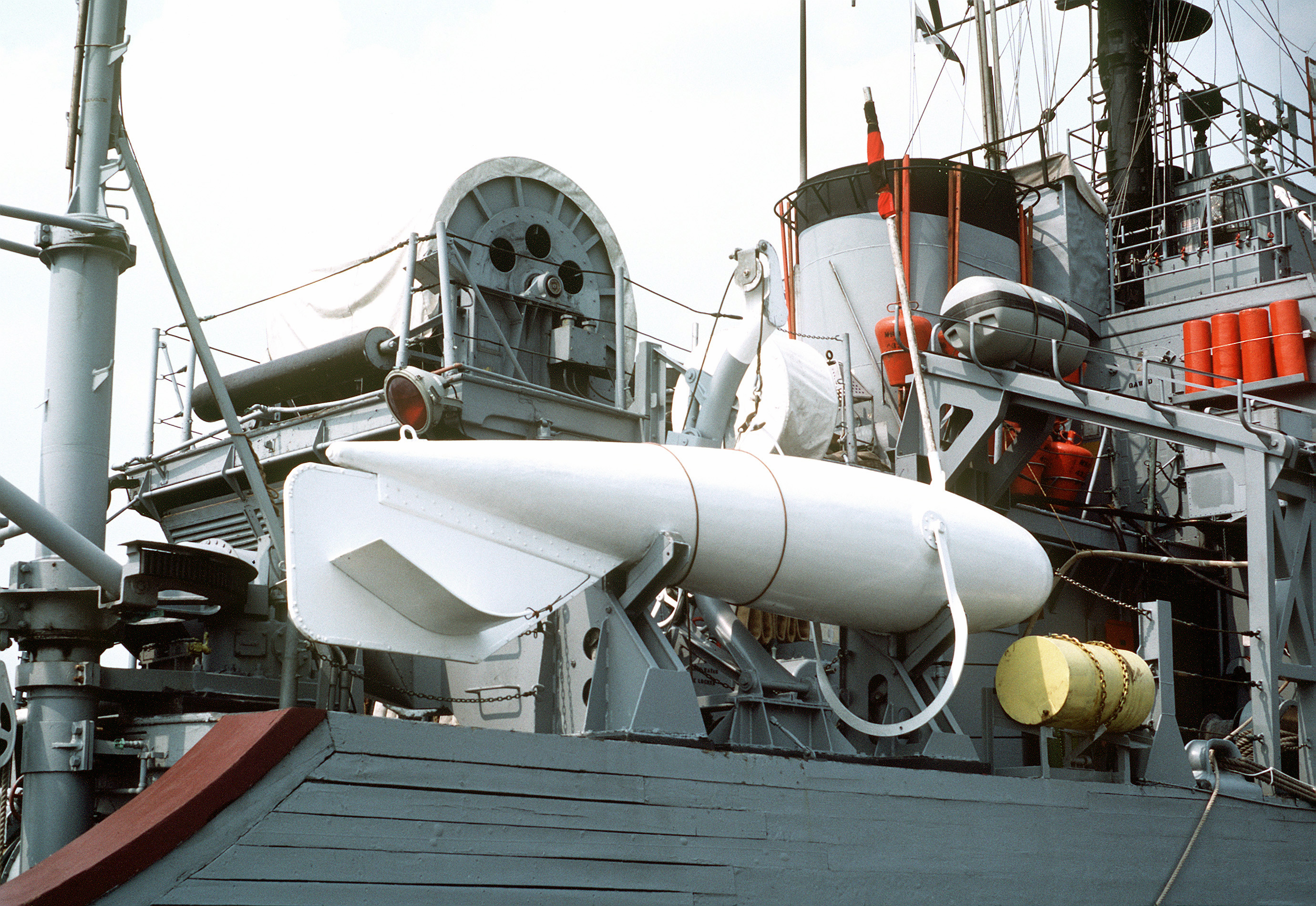
A paravane used for mine sweeping aboard USS Conquest

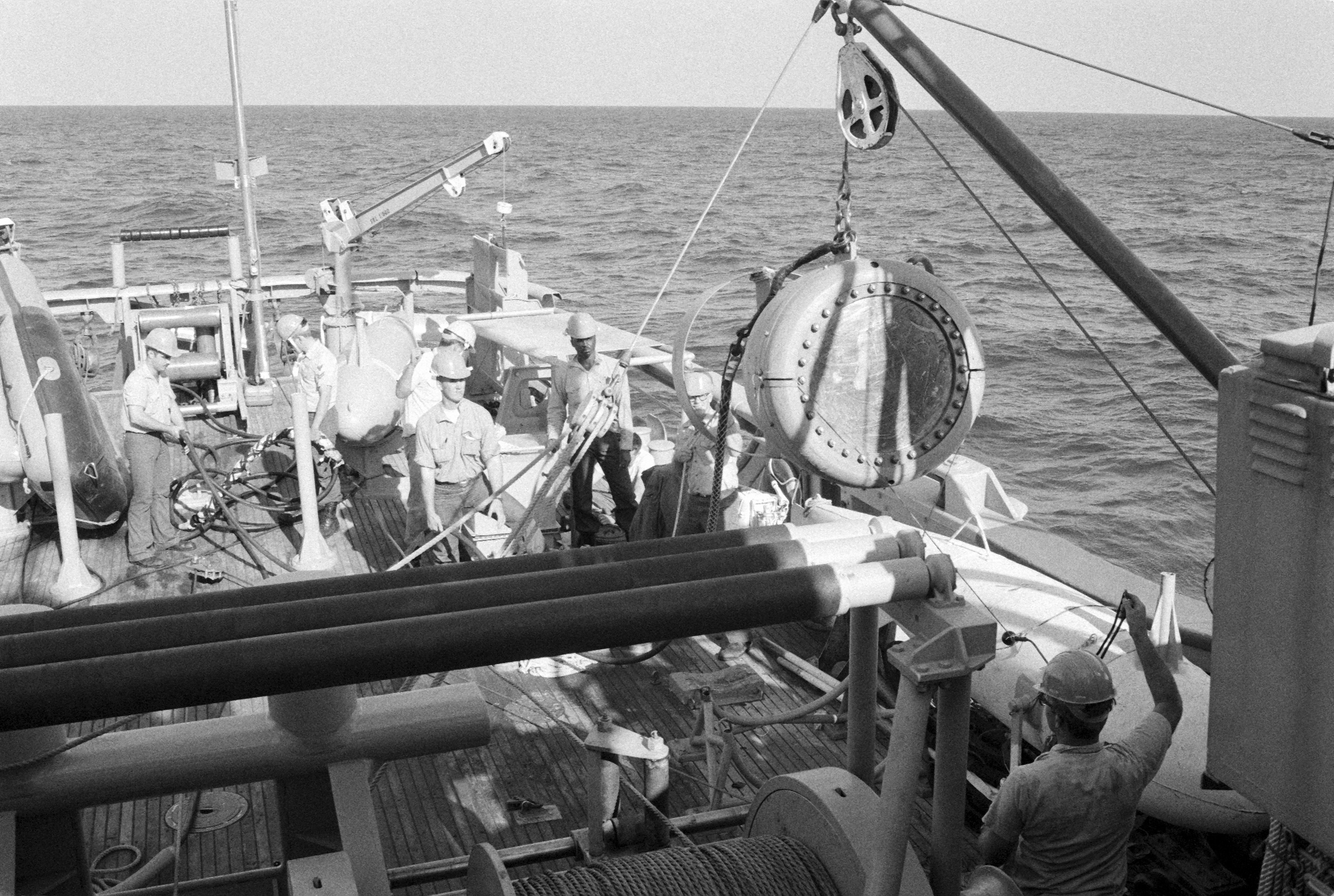
USS Illusive lowers an acoustical device during an exercise.

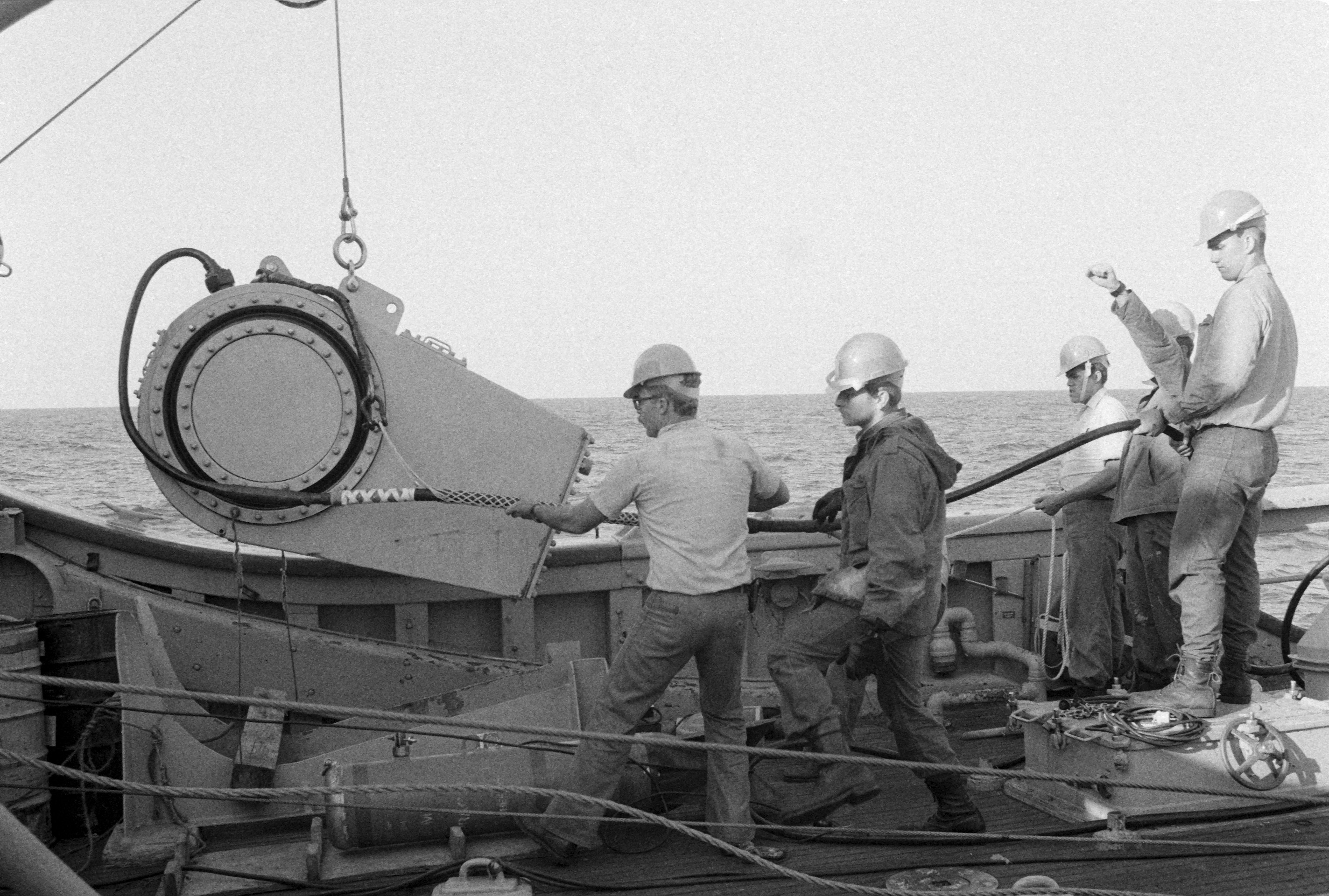
USS Illusive lowers a different acoustical device for training.

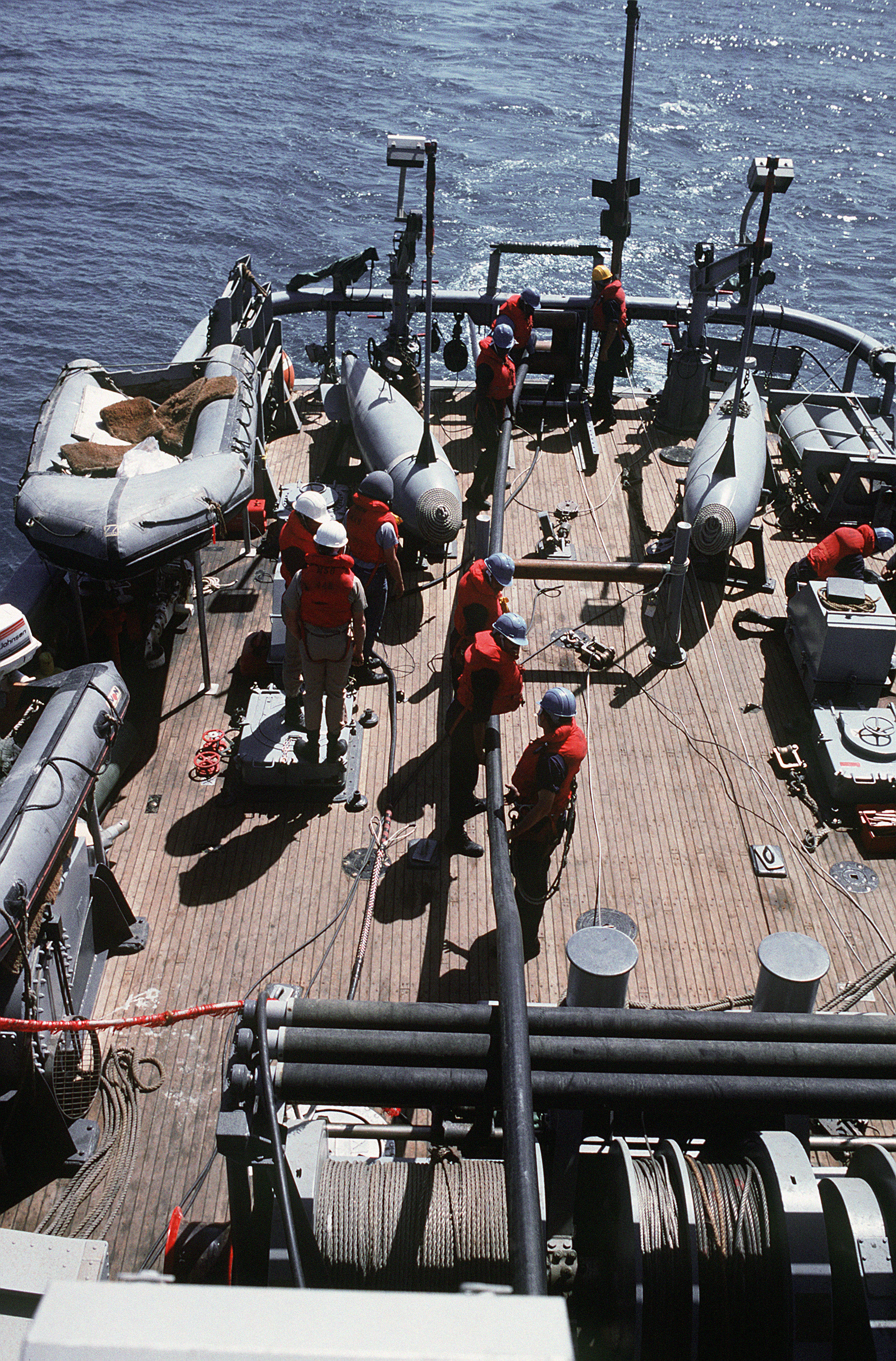
USS Illusive deploys a mineweeping cable.

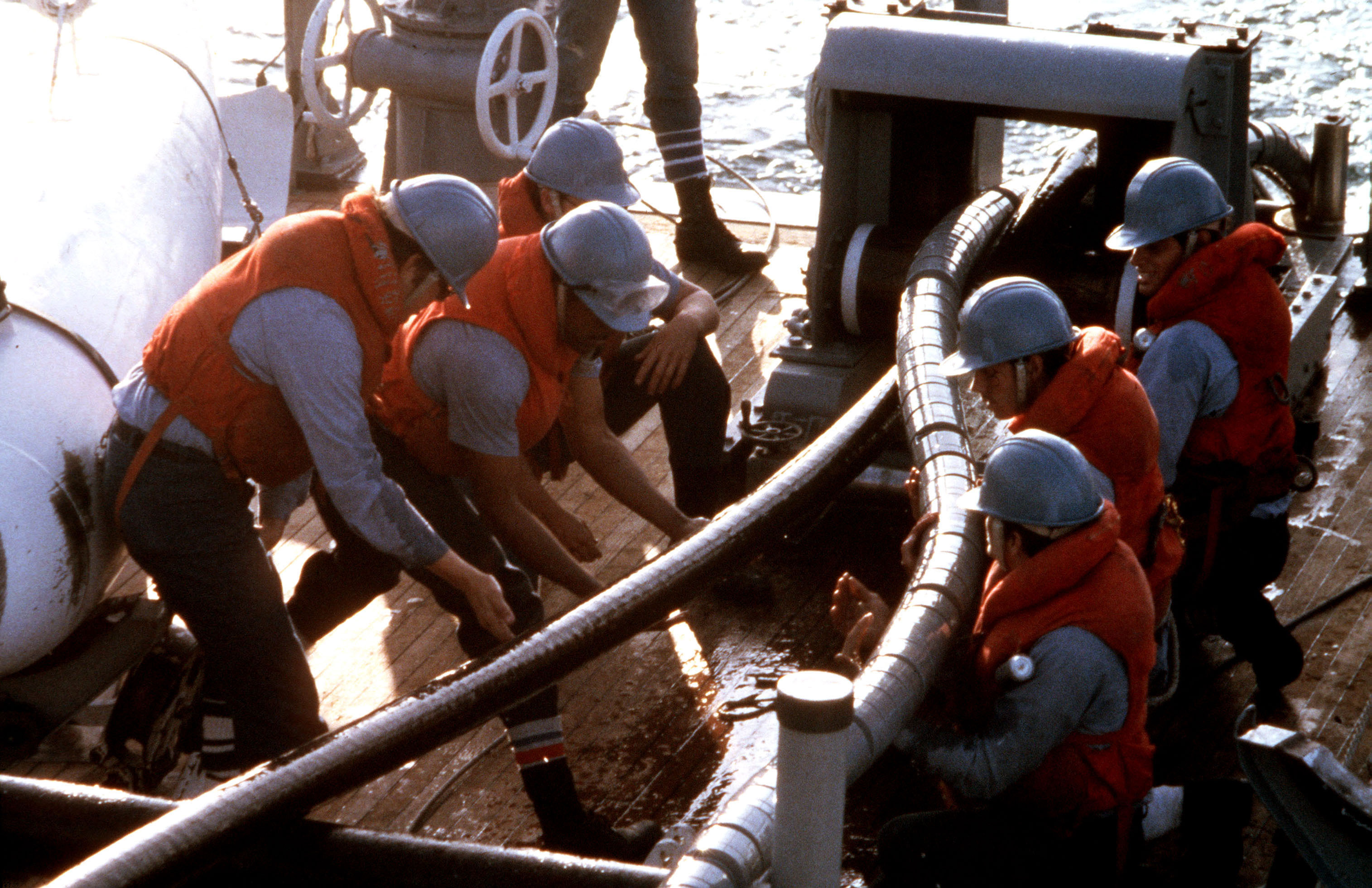
USS Constant deploying the "mag-tail", used to simulate the magnetic field of a vessel, are towed behind the ship to trigger magnetic mines.

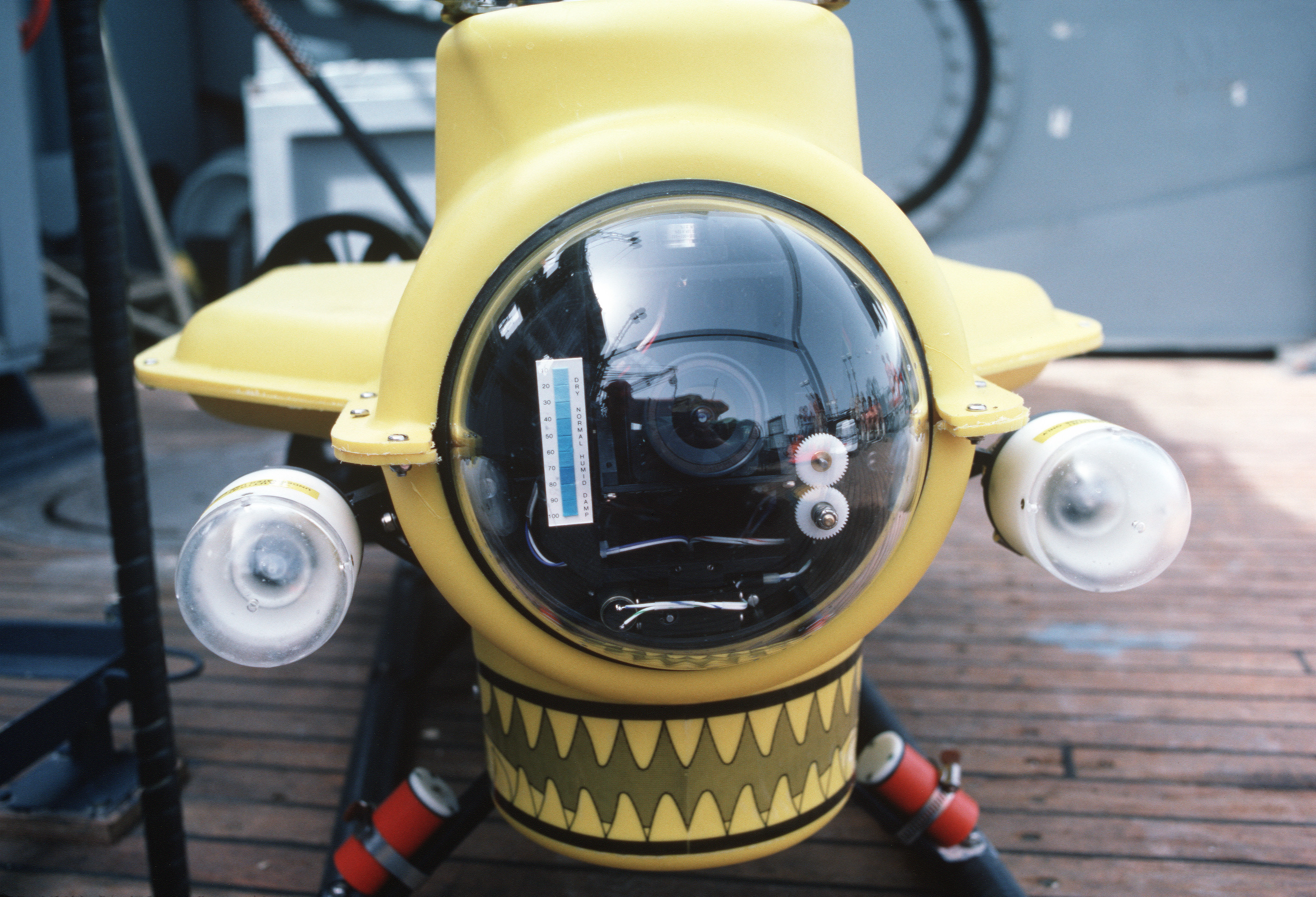
A remote control mine-seeking system, Super Sea Rover, aboard USS Conquest

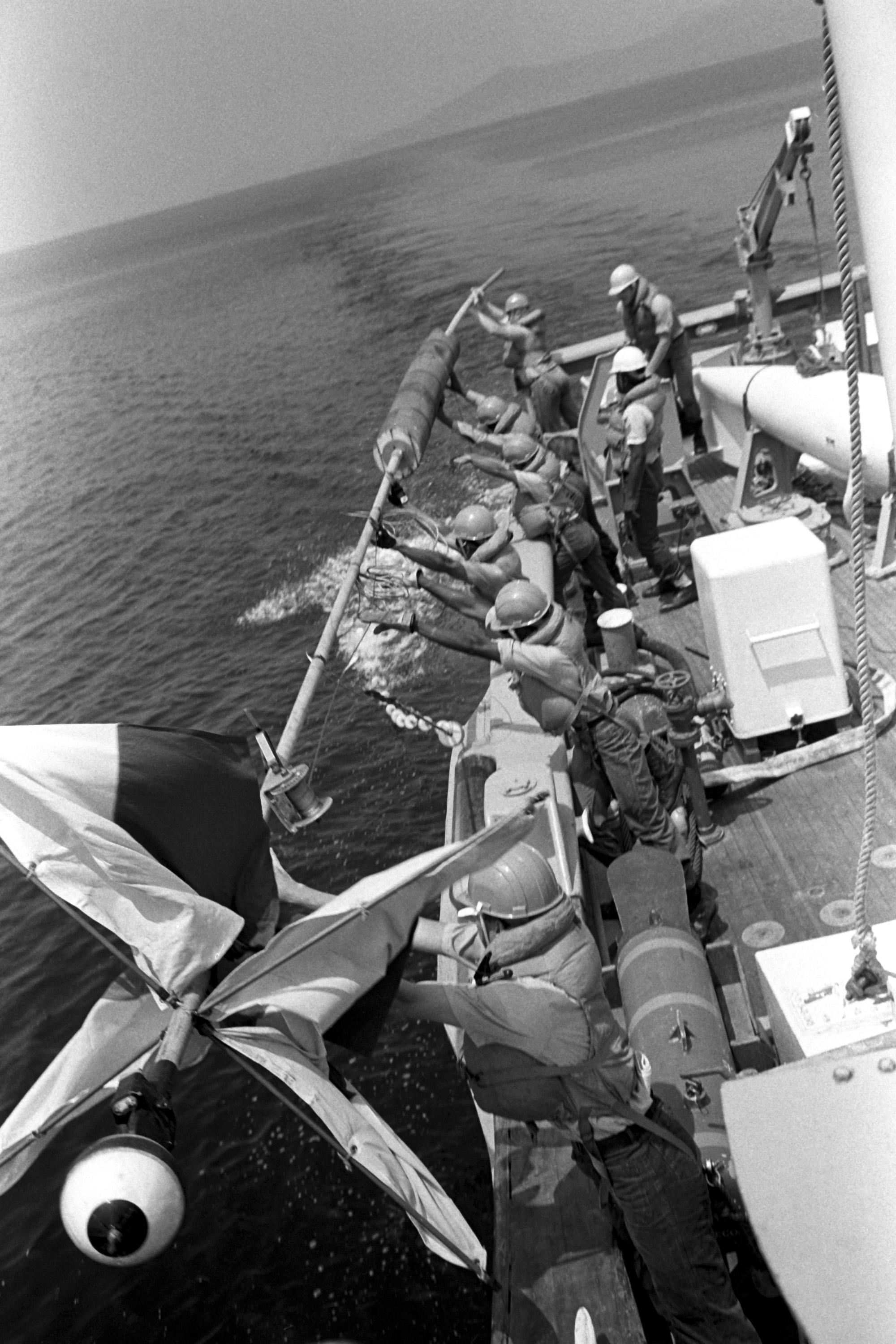
USS Esteem deploys a marker, for marking mines or mine fields.

== Units ==
Ship Name	Hull no.	Builder	Commission– Decommission	Fate	Link
Aggressive	422	Luders Marine Construction Co. of Stamford, Connecticut	1953–1971	Sold for scrap 1980	
Avenge	423	Luders Marine Construction Co. of Stamford, Connecticut	1954-1970	Destroyed by fire, sold for scrapping 1969	
Bold	424	Norfolk Naval Shipyard	1953-1971	Sold for scrap 1981	
Bulwark	425	Norfolk Naval Shipyard	1953-1971	Sold for scrap 1980	
Conflict	426	Fulton Shipyard, Antioch, California	1954-1973	Sold for scrap 1973	
Constant	427	Fulton Shipyard., Antioch, California	1954-1992	Sold for scrap 2001	Naval Vessel Register
428 - 431 were US Dash-class minesweepers
Dynamic	432	Colberg Boat Works., Stockton, California	1953-1971	Sold or loaned to Spain as Guadalete M41, 1971.	Naval Vessel Register
Engage	433	Colberg Boat Works., Stockton, California	1953-1991	Scrapped 2002	Naval Vessel Register
Embattle	434	Colberg Boat Works., Stockton, California	1954-1972	Sold to be scrapped 1976, privately held until scrapped by USACE in 1993.	Naval Vessel Register
Endurance	435	J. M. Martinac Shipbuilding Corp., Tacoma, Washington	1954-1972	Sold for scrap 1973	Naval Vessel Register
Energy	436	J. M. Martinac Shipbuilding Corp., Tacoma, Washington	1954-1972	Loaned to Philippines 1972; Sold for scrap 1977	Naval Vessel Register
Enhance	437	Martinolich Shipbuilding Co., San Diego, California	1955-1970; 1971-1991	Sold for scrap 2000	Naval Vessel Register
Esteem	438	Martinolich Shipbuilding Co., San Diego, California	1955-1970; 1971-1991	Sold for scrap 2000	Naval Vessel Register
Excel	439	Higgins Corp., New Orleans, Louisiana	1955-1992	Sold for scrap 2000	Naval Vessel Register
Exploit	440	Higgins Corp., New Orleans, Louisiana	1954-1993	Sold for scrap 2002	Naval Vessel Register
Exultant	441	Higgins Corp., New Orleans, Louisiana	1954-1993	Sold for scrap 2002	Naval Vessel Register
Fearless	442	Higgins Corp., New Orleans, Louisiana	1954-1990	Sold for scrap 1992	Naval Vessel Register
Fidelity	443	Higgins Corp., New Orleans, Louisiana	1955-1989	Sold for scrap 1990	Naval Vessel Register
Firm	444	J. M. Martinac Shipbuilding Corp., Tacoma, Washington	1954-1972	Loaned to Philippines 1972; Scrapped 1977	Naval Vessel Register
Force	445	J. M. Martinac Shipbuilding Corp., Tacoma, Washington	1955-1973	Sunk after a fire	Naval Vessel Register
Fortify	446	Seattle Shipbuilding and Drydocking Co., Seattle, Washington	1954-1992	Scrapped 2002	Naval Vessel Register
Guide	447	Seattle Shipbuilding and Drydocking Co., Seattle, Washington	1955-1972	Sold for scrap 1973	Naval Vessel Register
Illusive	448	Martinolich Shipbuilding Co., San Diego, California	1953-1990	Sold for scrap 1993	Naval Vessel Register
Impervious	449	Martinolich Shipbuilding Co., San Diego, California	1954-1991	Scrapped 2002	Naval Vessel Register
450 - 454 built at Bellingham Shipyards Co., Bellingham, Washington for France, not necessarily Aggressive-class ships.
Implicit	455	Wilmington Boat Works Inc., Wilmington, California	1954-1994	Sold to Taiwan 1994 and decommissioned in 2025. Scrapped in Kaohsiung, 2026.	Naval Vessel Register
Inflict	456	Wilmington Boat Works Inc., Wilmington, California	1954-1990	Sold for scrap 1992	Naval Vessel Register
Loyalty	457	Wilmington Boat Works Inc., Wilmington, California	1954-1972	Sold for scrap 1973	Naval Vessel Register
Lucid	458	Higgins Corp., New Orleans, Louisiana	1955-1970	Sold for civilian use 1976; Currently being restored by the Stockton Maritime Museum as a museum ship	Naval Vessel Register
Nimble	459	Higgins Corp., New Orleans, Louisiana	1955-1970	Sold for scrap 1981	Naval Vessel Register
Notable	460	Higgins Corp., New Orleans, Louisiana	1955-1970	Sold for scrap 1971	Naval Vessel Register
Observer	461	Higgins Corp., New Orleans, Louisiana	1955-1972	Sold for scrap 1979	Naval Vessel Register
Pinnacle	462	Higgins Corp., New Orleans, Louisiana	1955-1970	Sold for scrap 1978	Naval Vessel Register
Pivot	463	Wilmington Boat Works Inc., Wilmington, California	1954-1971	Initially loaned then sold to Spain as Guadalmedina M42, 1974. Decommissioned by Spain 2001.	Naval Vessel Register
Pluck	464	Wilmington Boat Works Inc., Wilmington, California	1954-1990	Sold for scrap 1992	Naval Vessel Register
Prestige	465	Wilmington Boat Works Inc., Wilmington, California	1954-1958	Grounded and sunk, 1958 in the Naruto Strait	
Prime	466	Wilmington Boat Works Inc., Wilmington, California	1954-1970	Sold for scrap 1976	Naval Vessel Register
Reaper	467	Wilmington Boat Works Inc., Wilmington, California	1954-1972	Sold for scrap 1976	Naval Vessel Register
Rival	468	Luders Marine Construction Co. of Stamford, Connecticut	1954-1970	Sold for scrap 1971	Naval Vessel Register
Sagacity	469	Luders Marine Construction Co. of Stamford, Connecticut	1955-1970	Grounded at Charleston Harbor then sold for scrap 1970.	
Salute	470	Luders Marine Construction Co. of Stamford, Connecticut	1955-1970	Sold for scrap 1971	Naval Vessel Register
Skill	471	Luders Marine Construction Co. of Stamford, Connecticut	1950-1970	Sold for scrap 1979, scrapped 1983.	Naval Vessel Register
Valor	472	Burger Boat Company, Manitowoc, Wisconsin	1954-1970	Sold for scrap 1971	Naval Vessel Register
Vigor	473	Burger Boat Company, Manitowoc, Wisconsin	1954-1972	Sold to Spain as Guadiana M44, 1972. Scrapped by Spain after 1999.	Naval Vessel Register
Vital	474	Burger Boat Company, Manitowoc, Wisconsin	1955-1972	Sold for scrap 1979	Naval Vessel Register
475 - 487 built for France, Portugal, Spain, Belgium and the Netherlands, not necessarily Aggressive-class ships.
Conquest	488	J. M. Martinac Shipbuilding Corp., Tacoma, Washington	1955-1970; 1971-1994	Sold to Taiwan 1994 and decommissioned in 2020.	Naval Vessel Register
Gallant	489	J. M. Martinac Shipbuilding Corp., Tacoma, Washington	1955-1994	Sold to Taiwan 1994 and decommissioned in 2013.	Naval Vessel Register
Leader	490	J. M. Martinac Shipbuilding Corp., Tacoma, Washington	1955-1970; 1971-1991/92	Sold for scrap 1994	Naval Vessel Register
Persistent	491	J. M. Martinac Shipbuilding Corp., Tacoma, Washington	1956-1971	Initially loaned in 1971 then sold to Spain as Guadalquivir M43	Naval Vessel Register
Pledge	492	J. M. Martinac Shipbuilding Corp., Tacoma, Washington	1956-1994	Sold to Taiwan 1994 and decommissioned 2021.	Naval Vessel Register
Stalwart	493	Broward Marine Inc, Fort Lauderdale, Florida	1956-1966	Caught fire pier side at San Juan, Puerto Rico, sunk 1966. Later raised and sunk as an artificial reef.	
Sturdy	494	Broward Marine Inc, Fort Lauderdale, Florida	1957-1971	Sold for scrap 1978	Naval Vessel Register
Swerve	495	Broward Marine Inc, Fort Lauderdale, Florida	1957-1971	Sold for scrap 1978	Naval Vessel Register
Venture	496	Broward Marine Inc, Fort Lauderdale, Florida	1958-1971	Sold for scrap 1978	
MSO-497	497	Cancelled, never built			

== See also ==
- HNLMS Onverschrokken (M886) - Dutch Aggressive-class minesweeper
