= USS Fidelity (AM-443) =

Minesweeper of the United States Navy

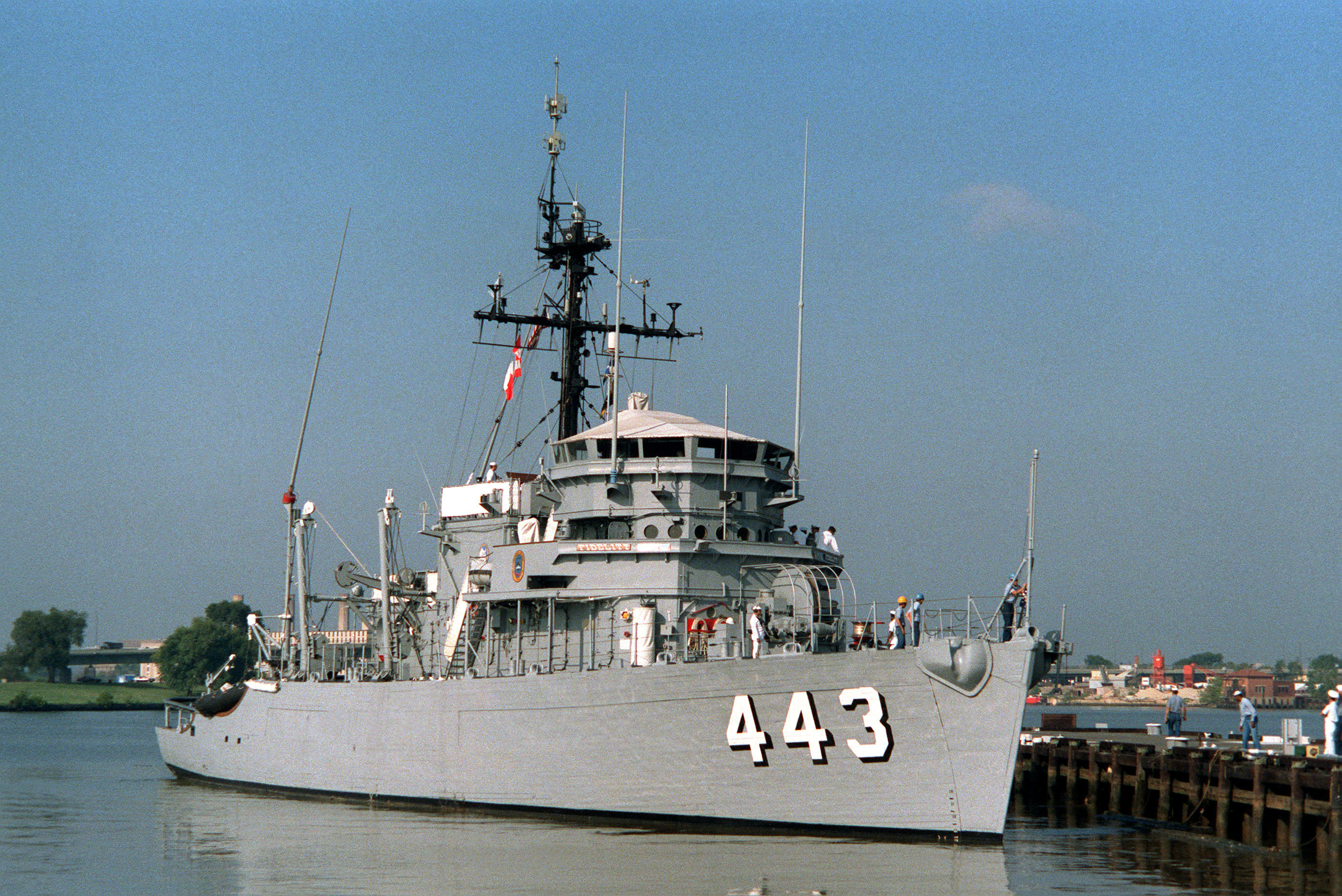
- USS Fidelity (MSO-443)

History

United States
- Name: USS Fidelity
- Builder: Higgins Inc., New Orleans, Louisiana
- Laid down: 15 December 1952
- Launched: 21 August 1953
- Commissioned: 19 January 1955, as AM-443
- Decommissioned: 19 May 1989
- Reclassified: MSO-443, 7 February 1955
- Stricken: 16 June 1989
- Fate: Sold for scrapping, 10 September 1990

General characteristics
- Class & type: Aggressive-class minesweeper
- Displacement: 775 tons
- Length: 172 ft (52.43 m)
- Beam: 36 ft (10.97 m)
- Draft: 10 ft (3.05 m)
- Propulsion: 4 × Packard ID1700 diesel engines (replaced by 4 Waukasha Motors Co. diesels); 2 × shafts; 2 × controllable pitch propellers
- Speed: 14 knots (26 km/h; 16 mph)
- Complement: 8 officers, 70 enlisted
- Armament: 1 × single 40 mm gun mount (later replaced by 1 × twin 20 mm gun mount); 2 × .50 cal (12.7 mm) twin machine guns

USS Fidelity (AM-443/MSO-443) was an Agile-class minesweeper. Laid down on 15 December 1952 at Higgins Inc., New Orleans, Louisiana; launched on 21 August 1953; commissioned on 19 January 1955; redesignated as an Ocean Minesweeper, MSO-443, 7 February 1955.

== Service history ==
=== North Atlantic operations ===
Fidelity first arrived at her home port, Charleston, South Carolina, 1 May 1955, and through the next year ranged widely in the western Atlantic, serving with the Mine Countermeasures Station at Panama City, Florida, participating in fleet exercises, and calling at Halifax, Nova Scotia. Between 29 August 1957 and 13 February 1958, she served her first tour of duty in the Mediterranean with the U.S. 6th Fleet, joining in sweeping exercises as well as a large scale NATO training operation.

=== Supporting Middle East Crisis ===
The minesweeper sailed directly to Beirut, Lebanon, on her 1958 deployment to the Mediterranean, arriving 15 August to support the U.S. Marines landed a month earlier to stabilize the critical Middle Eastern situation. After an eight-day visit, she took up a regular Mediterranean tour schedule, which included visits to ports in Greece, Crete, and the Balearic Isles before her return to Charleston, South Carolina, 3 November.

Between 24 July 1959 and 11 February 1960, Fidelity completed a third tour of duty in the Mediterranean, returning to coastwise operations through 1962.

== Decommissioning ==
Fidelity was decommissioned, 19 May 1989; struck from the Naval Register, 16 June 1989; sold for scrapping, 10 September 1990 to Wyns Hoggs for $13,775.
