= USS Gallant (MSO-489) =

Minesweeper of the United States Navy

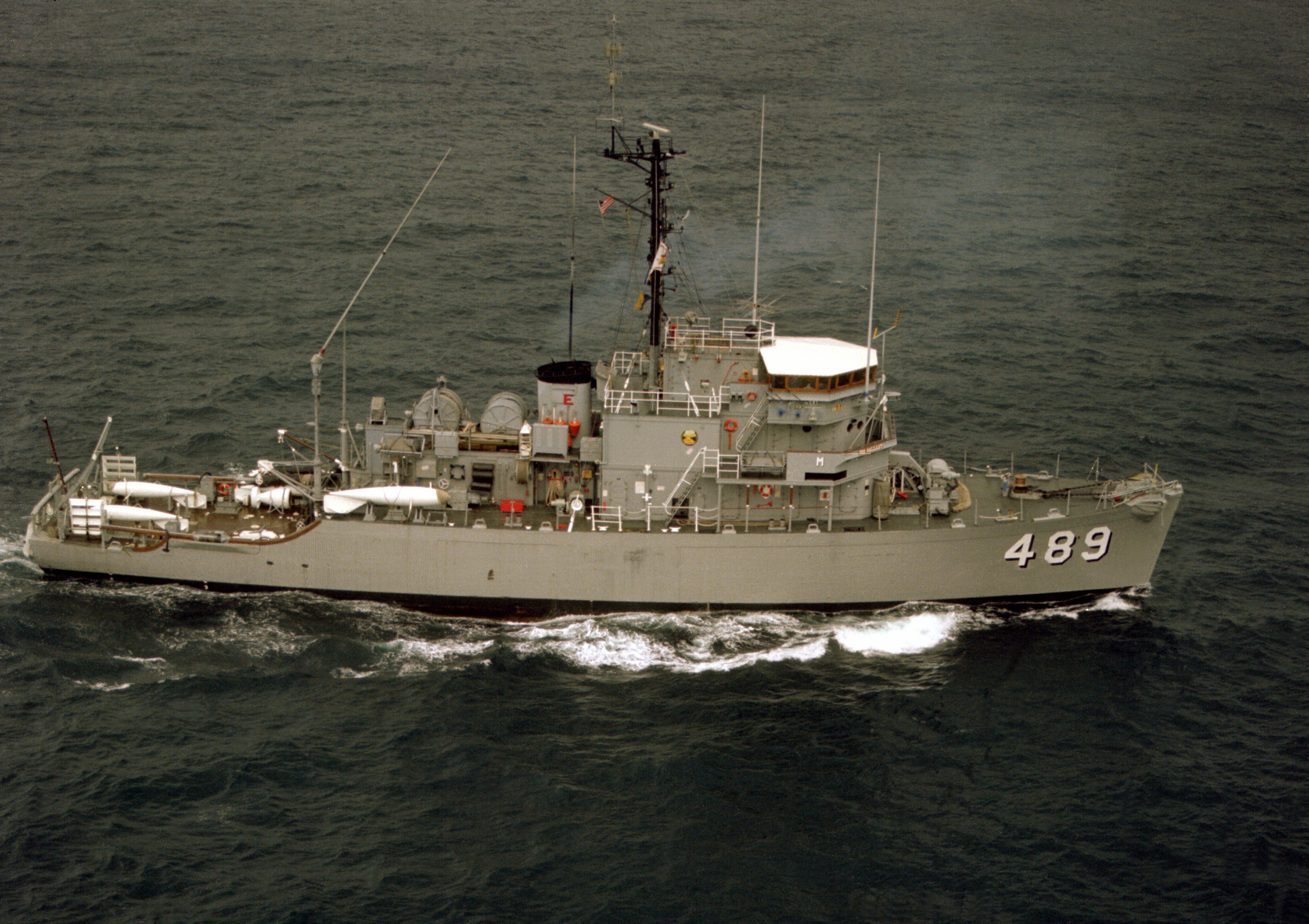
- USS Gallant

History

United States
- Name: USS Gallant (AM-489)
- Builder: J. M. Martinac Shipbuilding Corp., Tacoma, Washington
- Laid down: 21 May 1953
- Launched: 4 June 1954
- Completed: 2 September 1955
- Commissioned: 14 September 1955
- Decommissioned: 29 April 1994
- Reclassified: MSO-489, 7 February 1955
- Stricken: 8 September 1994
- Fate: Sold to the Republic of China, 8 September 1994

Taiwan
- Name: ROCS Yung Ku (MSO-1308)
- Acquired: 8 September 1994
- Decommissioned: 28 June 2013

General characteristics
- Class & type: Aggressive-class minesweeper
- Displacement: 775 long tons (787 t)
- Length: 172 ft (52.43 m)
- Beam: 36 ft (10.97 m)
- Draft: 10 ft (3.05 m)
- Propulsion: 4 × Packard ID1700 diesel engines; replaced by 4 × Waukesha diesels; two shafts; two controllable pitch propellers
- Speed: 14 knots (26 km/h; 16 mph)
- Complement: 70
- Armament: Initial configuration : 1 × 40 mm gun; 2 × .50 cal (12.7 mm) machine guns; Final configuration : 1 × twin 20 mm gun; 2 × .50 cal. machine guns

USS Gallant (MSO-489), an Aggressive-class minesweeper, was the second ship of the United States Navy to be named Gallant. The ship served in the US Navy from 1954 until 1994, when it was sold to Taiwan under the Security Assistance Program and renamed to Yung Ku (M 1308).

The second Gallant (AM-489) was laid down on 21 May 1953 by J. M. Martinac Shipbuilding Corp., Tacoma, Washington; launched on 4 June 1954; sponsored by Mrs. Walter Meserole; reclassified (MSO-489) on 7 February 1955; and commissioned as Gallant (MSO-489) at Tacoma on 14 September 1955.

== Service history ==
=== 1955–1960 ===
After shakedown, Gallant based from Long Beach, California, as a unit of Mine Division 96, Mine Force, U.S. Pacific Fleet. Her readiness exercises ranged as far south as Acapulco, Mexico. She rescued two crew members of a Navy plane downed off Santa Catalina Island and joined Mine Division 73 in January 1957 for concentrated training preparatory to a six-month tour with the 7th Fleet; (March–August 1957). This duty found her in Korean waters for combined operations with the Republic of Korea Navy, followed by similar service off Formosa with units of the Chinese Nationalist Navy. Other training took her to ports of Japan and Hong Kong before her return to Long Beach on 20 August 1957.

After a yard overhaul at San Diego, she took part in amphibious landing exercises along the California coast followed by combined mine sweeping operations; with Canadian Mine Squadron 2 off the coast of Vancouver, British Columbia, in October 1958. Another overhaul period was completed by April 1959 when she began refresher training and mine countermeasures exercises that won her the Battle Efficiency Competition Award "E" and the Minesweeping "M" as the outstanding minesweeper of the Pacific Mine Force during Fiscal 1959.

=== 1960–1966 ===
Gallant's second tour with the 7th Fleet (August 1959-March 1960) again included training with the Republic of Korea Navy. While operating out of the Philippines, she participated in joint readiness operations with the navies of SEATO nations. She returned to Long Beach in March 1960 and spent the next 12 months in a training schedule with the Mine force of the 1st Fleet that carried her as far north as Ketchikan, Alaska.

Service during her third deployment in the Far East (August 1961-April 1962) once again included fleet readiness defense exercises with the navies of Southeast Asia. In addition, she patrolled the coast of South Vietnam and provided valuable service during training operations of the South Vietnam Navy. Returning to the West Coast on 20 April 1962, she resumed duty out of Long Beach; and during the next 15 months participated in fleet maneuvers and mine squadron exercises off southern California.

Departing Long Beach on 12 August 1963, Gallant steamed on her fourth deployment to the troubled Far East, where she arrived Sasebo, Japan, on 23 September. There, she resumed peace-keeping operations with the 7th Fleet; and, during readiness patrols in Far Eastern waters, she cruised from the coast of South Korea through the East China and South China Seas to the coast of Southeast Asia. She departed WestPac in the spring of 1964, and after additional training in hunting mines, sailed for blockade and coastal patrol duty off Vietnam. Arriving off the southern coast of South Vietnam on 1 October 1965, she joined "Operation Market Time", designed to control coastal infiltration of men and supplies by the Viet Cong. Throughout the remainder of the year, Gallant boarded and searched suspicious Vietnamese boats. She supported "Market Time" operations until 9 March 1966 when she departed for the United States. Steaming via the Philippines, Guam, and Pearl Harbor, she arrived Long Beach on 28 April. During the remainder of the year, she operated along the West Coast from Long Beach to Portland, Oregon, to maintain her fighting capabilities and operational readiness. Gallant returned to Vietnam waters in 1969 to continue its support of Operation Market Time, patrolling off the Cue Viet, making port at Da Nang and Cam Rhan Bay, and running a typhoon evasion in the South China Sea. Captain at the time was Lt. Cdr. Robert Freehill.

During September 1966, the vessel was used in the filming of the Elvis Presley film, Easy Come, Easy Go.

=== Decommissioning and sale ===
Decommissioned on 29 April 1994 Gallant was sold to Taiwan on 8 September 1994, under the Security Assistance Program, and renamed Yung Ku (M 1308).
