= USS Lucid (MSO-458) =

Aggressive-class minesweeper

Coordinates: 37.953869°N 121.342577°W

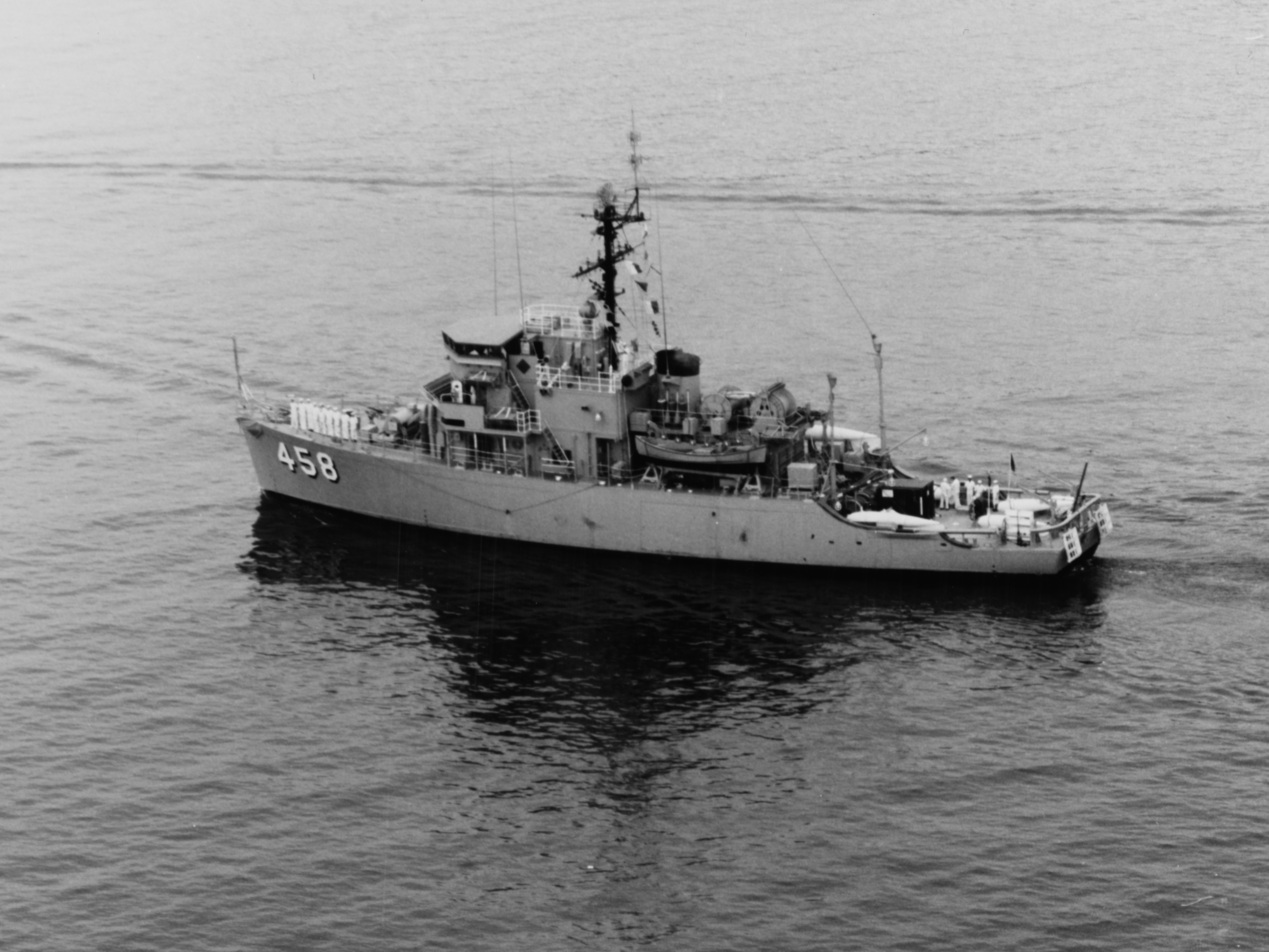
- Lucid underway in the Pacific Ocean in February 1970

History

United States
- Name: Lucid
- Namesake: bright, shining
- Builder: Higgins Inc. Shipyard, New Orleans, Louisiana
- Cost: $9 million
- Laid down: 16 March 1953
- Launched: 14 November 1953
- Commissioned: 4 May 1955
- Decommissioned: 23 December 1970
- Stricken: 15 May 1976
- Home port: Long Beach, California
- Fate: Currently undergoing restoration as a museum ship in Stockton, California
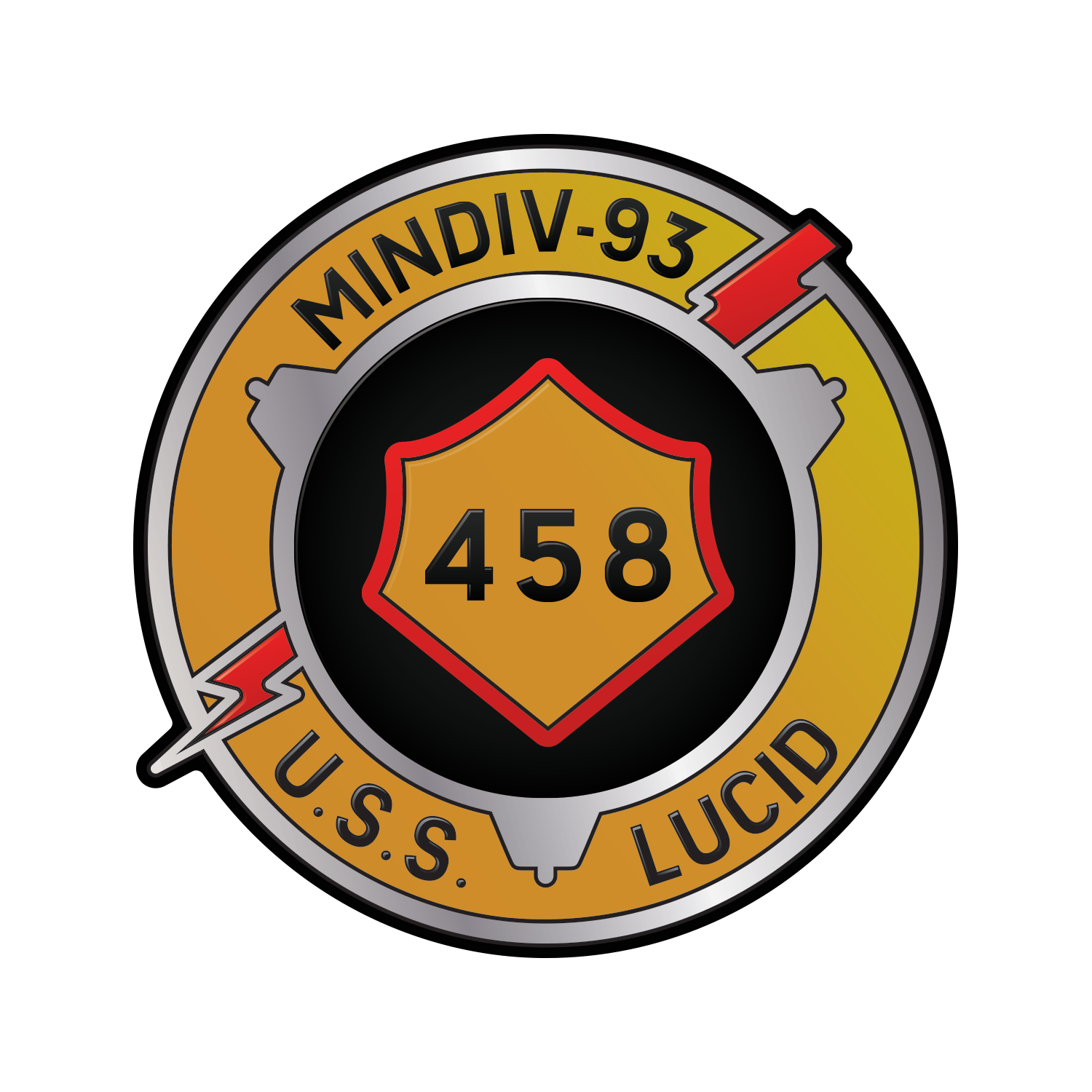
- Badge: Insignia of the U.S. Navy minesweeper USS Lucid ca. late 1960s

General characteristics
- Class & type: Aggressive-class minesweeper
- Displacement: 775 tons
- Length: 172 ft (52 m)
- Beam: 35 ft (11 m)
- Draft: 10 ft (3.0 m)
- Propulsion: 4 × Packard ID1700 diesel engines; 2 × shafts, 2 × controllable pitch propellers
- Speed: 14 knots (26 km/h; 16 mph)
- Complement: 6 officers 65 enlisted
- Sensors & processing systems: AN/SQQ-14 mine hunting sonar
- Armament: 1 × 40 mm gun (removed); 2 × .50 cal (12.7 mm) machine gun

USS Lucid (AM-458/MSO-458) is an Aggressive-class minesweeper acquired by the U.S. Navy for the task of removing naval mines that had been placed in the water to prevent the safe passage of ships. She was launched soon after the Korean War, sailed on five Western Pacific (Westpac) cruises and served four tours in Vietnam during the Vietnam War. Lucid was decommissioned at the end of 1970 and placed in mothballs after only 15 years of service, as the Vietnam War was winding down and there was no longer a need for a large fleet of minesweepers. She was purchased by civilians and served as a houseboat for ten years, before being sold again in 1986 and used as a warehouse by a scrap metal dealer on Bradford Island, in the Sacramento–San Joaquin River Delta. The scrap metal dealer was murdered in 2004 over a property dispute, and in 2005, Lucid was acquired by a foundation seeking to save a ship of its class. In 2011, the ship was moved to the Stockton Maritime Museum to be restored for use as a museum ship. Lucid is the last Aggressive-class minesweeper afloat in the United States.

== Military service ==
=== WestPac tours of duty ===
The second warship to be named Lucid by the United States Navy, the keel of AM-458 was laid down by Higgins Inc. Shipyard in New Orleans, Louisiana on 16 March 1953. The vessel was launched on 14 November 1953, sponsored by Mrs. Mary J. Barrow and was reclassified MSO-458 on 7 February 1955. Lucid was commissioned on 4 May 1955, Lieutenant J. H. Graham, USN in command.

After shakedown in the Caribbean, Lucid sailed for the Pacific Ocean, arriving at Long Beach, California on 22 August. For the next thirteen months, she performed mine warfare exercises on the U.S. West Coast, then sailed on her first western Pacific tour on 1 October 1956, under the command of Lt. Hollis T. Rodgers. During the period from 1956 to 5 November 1963, Lucid sailed on four WestPac cruises and while there performed operations with the U.S. 7th Fleet. In addition to exercises with the 7th Fleet, the minesweeper participated in goodwill programs in the countries she visited. The time between WestPac cruises was spent in mine countermeasure exercises off the southern California coast.

=== Supporting Market Time operations ===
Throughout 1964 Lucid continued training exercises off the U.S. West Coast, then departed Long Beach on 5 April 1965 on her fifth WestPac cruise. Arriving at Subic Bay in the Philippine Islands on 24 May, she prepared for Operation Market Time off the coast of Vietnam. From June to October the minesweeper continued patrol and surveillance of Vietnamese junk traffic. She boarded a total of 186 junks and steel-hulled ships, and contributed to a reduction of enemy infiltration of men and supplies by sea. Lucid returned to Long Beach on 14 December and operated off the southern California coast until May 1966 when she commenced overhaul at Harbor Boat Building Co. in San Pedro, Los Angeles.

=== WestPac deployment after 1966 overhaul ===
In October 1966, having completed her overhaul, Lucid prepared for another WestPac deployment. She departed Long Beach on 6 January 1967. Lucid served once again with the Market Time forces, performing surveillance and search duties, as well as hunting mines in the harbors of South Vietnam. On 16 October 1967, she departed Subic Bay, homeward bound after a long deployment. Lucid arrived at Long Beach on 18 November. Following a brief overhaul period, and refresher training, she sailed for WestPac on 1 April 1968. Along with patrol duty off the Vietnamese coast and upkeep periods at Subic Bay and Singapore, Lucid conducted minesweeping exercises with allied navies. Returning to Long Beach in mid-October, the minesweeper began a yard period where she (remained) into 1969. In August 1969, Lucid completed an extensive shipyard overhaul which included major modifications and additions to operations and communications capabilities. Lucid made her fourth and final deployment to Vietnam between 12 April and 17 July 1970, returning to Long Beach in September.

=== Decommissioning ===
Lucid was decommissioned at U.S. Naval Shipyard Long Beach, California on 23 December 1970 and the ship was transferred to the U.S. Naval Ship Repair Facility, Long Beach.

Lucid was struck from the Navy Vessel Register on 15 May 1976 and "disposed of by Navy Sale" on 1 November 1976. The scrap yard removed valuable metals and equipment. The Defense Reutilization and Marketing Service sold her to W. Dean Kirkpatrick of San Francisco, California on 30 December 1976 for $40,250.

== Civilian service ==
Lucid was next converted to a houseboat. W. Dean Kirkpatrick and his wife Vicki, and later Dan Keller and his wife Anneli, lived aboard for several years. They were moored in various locations including Pier 4 at the western end of the Bay Bridge in San Francisco, the Oakland estuary below Alameda's Park Street Bridge, and a Richmond shipyard. This ended in late 1986 when Dean gave up the ship to William Gardner, who towed it up to Bradford Island in the Sacramento Delta where it sat for years. Gardner removed and sold everything of value from the ship and used it as a storage building, cutting a hole in the hull on the port side near the waterline to use as a door. On 7 September 2004, Gardner was fatally shot by his neighbor.

In 2005, Gardner's widow donated the ship to United States Navy veteran Mike Warren, who served on Lucid as an engineman in the 1960s. Since late 1999, Warren and his "Save an MSO Foundation" had unsuccessfully tried to save an Aggressive-class minesweeper as a museum ship as they were being decommissioned and replaced by the new Avenger class. The government refused to give one of the last six MSOs to the public, claiming that it was governmental policy not to donate wooden ships due to the cost and magnitude of the maintenance required for upkeep. Eventually, all six ships were dismantled at a cost to the government in excess of $3.5 million. Warren and a group of volunteers began the monumental task of restoring Lucid by first removing the tons of junk that had accumulated over the years and then repairing the hole in her side.

=== Museum ship ===
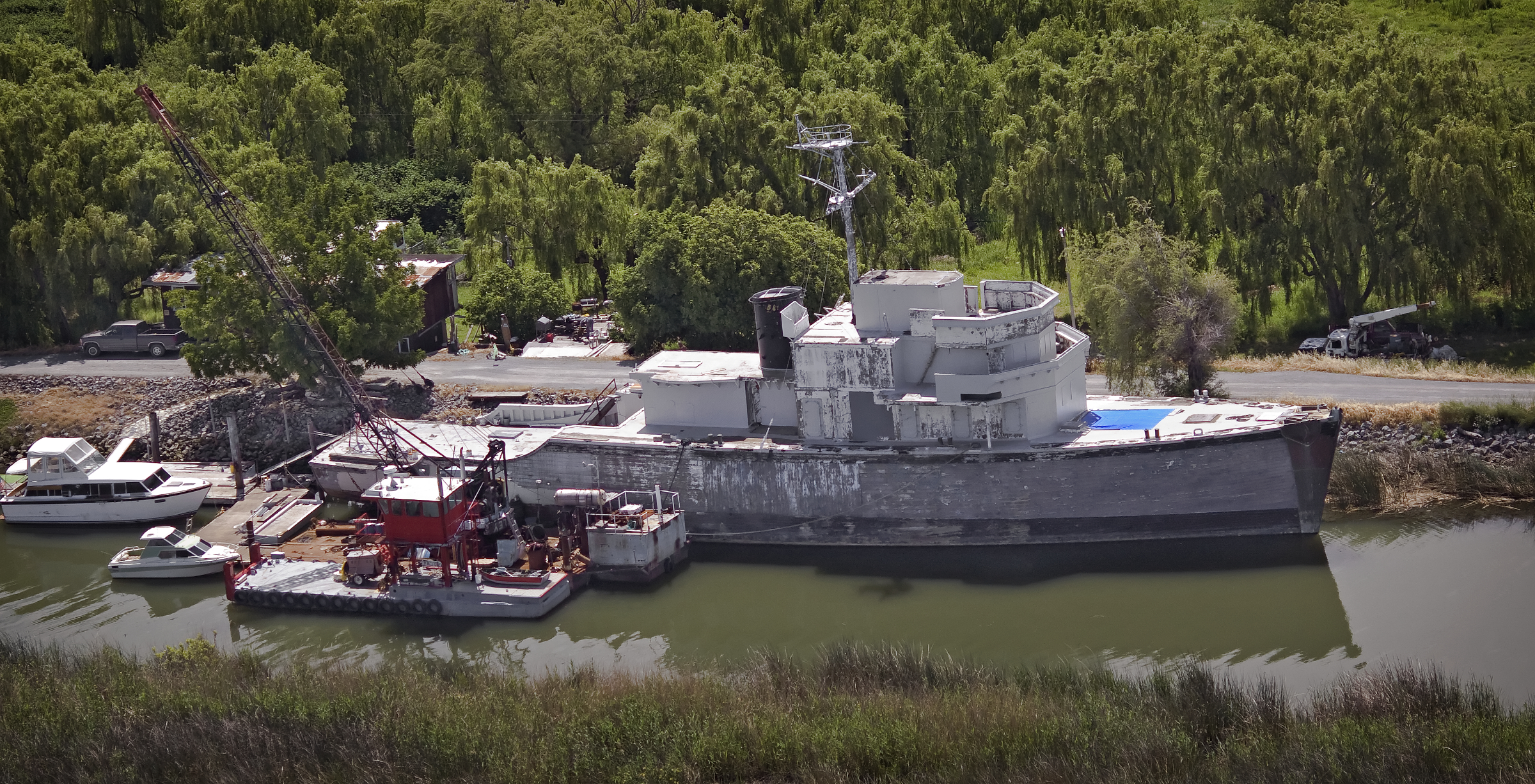
USS Lucid, Bradford Island, 2009, scrap and trashed removed, preservation begins.

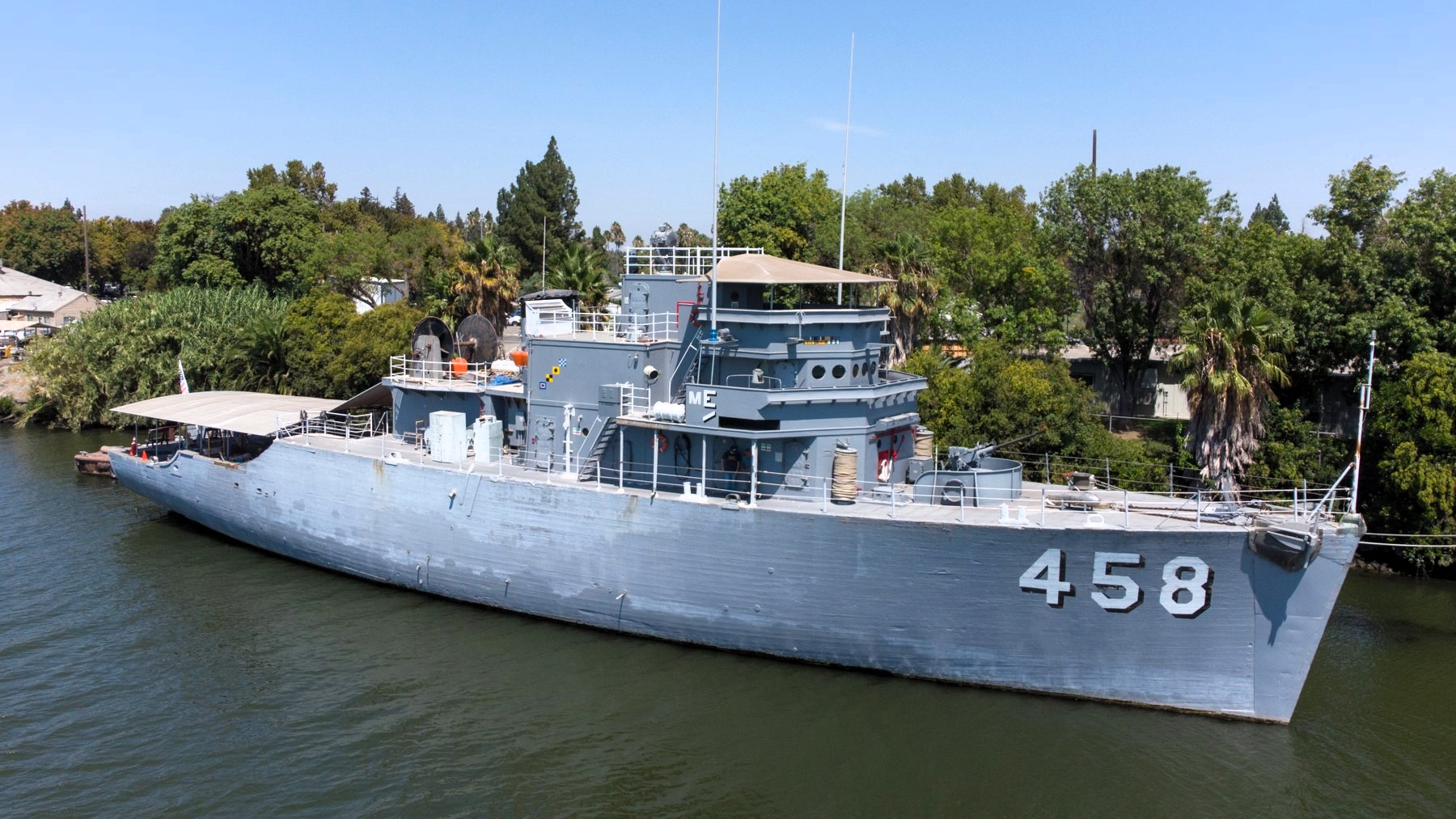
USS Lucid, Stockton, CA, 2025, about 85% of exterior restoration completed, awaiting deck gear, mast and bridge equipment.

Lucid was finally acquired by the Stockton Maritime Museum and in November 2011, she was moved from Bradford Island to her new berth in Stockton, California at a pier of the former Naval Reserve Center on Monte Diablo Avenue.

On 15 March 2012, USS Lucid was dedicated at a ribbon cutting ceremony presented by the Stockton Maritime Museum and the San Joaquin Building Futures Academy where she is now located. Academy students and volunteers are currently restoring the ship. Upon return to her original appearance, Lucid will be moved to the historic shipbuilding area near Weber Point in downtown Stockton where over a thousand boats and ships were built, beginning in the 1850s and ending in the 1980s. She will serve to honor Stockton’s maritime and shipbuilding history, the men and women who labored there, former and active duty Navy and those who served aboard the small vessels that were such a big part of the United States Navy.

As of 2026, property has been obtained on the historic downtown Stockton waterfront. Development permits have been submitted to construct a replica shipyard structure/museum building and facilities. Meanwhile, restoration continues on the ship.

== Awards and decorations ==
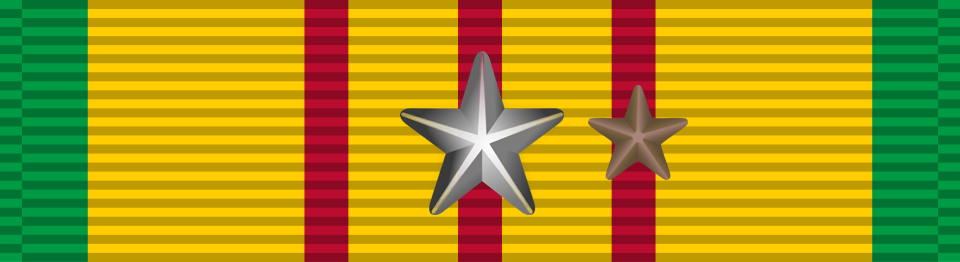

National Defense Service Medal, Vietnam Service Medal, Republic of Vietnam Meritorious Unit Citation (Gallantry Cross), and the Republic of Vietnam Campaign Medal.

Six Vietnam War Campaigns. Twice winner of the Battle Efficiency Award (1957-1961) presented to the most outstanding ship in each class. In 1963, she was nominated by Commander Mine Force Pacific for the Ney Memorial Award, which is awarded to the ship with the most outstanding food services facilities. In 1968, Lucid earned the White "M" for minesweeping efficiency.
