= USS Loyalty (AM-457) =

Minesweeper of the United States Navy

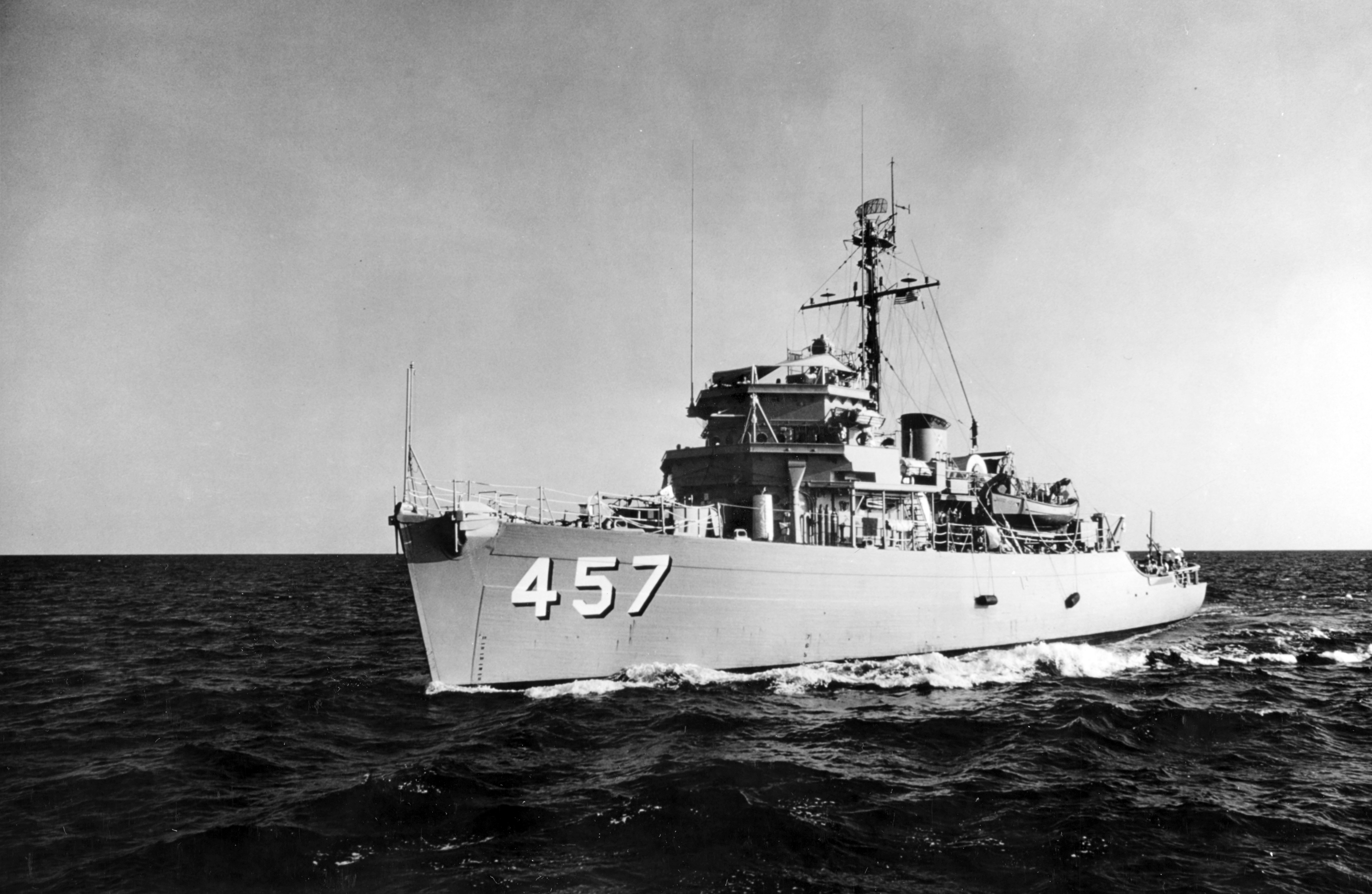
- USS Loyalty during Operation Market Time patrol, April 1966

History

United States
- Laid down: 9 November 1951
- Launched: 22 November 1953
- Commissioned: 11 June 1954
- Decommissioned: date unknown
- Stricken: 1 July 1972
- Home port: Long Beach, California
- Fate: disposed of December 1973

General characteristics
- Displacement: 620 tons
- Length: 172 ft (52 m)
- Beam: 36 ft (11 m)
- Draft: 10 ft (3.0 m)
- Speed: 16 knots
- Complement: 72
- Armament: one 40 mm mount

USS Loyalty (AM-457/MSO-457) was an Aggressive-class minesweeper acquired by the U.S. Navy for the task of removing mines that had been placed in the water to prevent the safe passage of ships.

The second warship to be named Loyalty by the Navy, AM-457 was laid down by Wilmington Boat Works Inc., Wilmington, California, 9 November 1951; launched 22 November 1953; sponsored by Mrs. William L. Horton; and commissioned 11 June 1954.

== First WestPac cruise ==
After shakedown Loyalty operated out of her home port, Long Beach, California, for the remaining months of 1954. Reclassified MSO-457 on 7 February 1955, the new minesweeper sailed on her first WestPac cruise 1 July. Operating with the U.S. 7th Fleet, Loyalty engaged in minesweeping exercises off Japan, Taiwan, and Korea before returning to Long Beach in February 1956.

== Three more Far East tours of duty ==
From 1956 until late 1964 Loyalty sailed on three WestPac cruises; performed special operations in 1962 during the nuclear tests in the Pacific Ocean; and exercised off the California coast perfecting the techniques of modern mine warfare. She also performed sonar searches for downed aircraft. Her service with the powerful U.S. 7th Fleet was climaxed during her 1964 cruise. Following the Gulf of Tonkin incident when North Vietnamese torpedo boats attacked U.S. destroyers in international waters, Loyalty was dispatched to steam off the coast of Vietnam ready for further provocation.

In 1962 - 1963, the Loyalty was one of five in a division of minesweepers that were deployed off the coast of Vietnam in the Tonkin Gulf to perform electronic countermeasures activities and to vector South Vietnamese gunboats to interdict large junks coming down the coast from North Vietnam that were suspected of providing arms and ammunition to cadres of Viet Cong operating in South Vietnam.

== Vietnam operations ==
Returning Long Beach 7 December, the minesweeper performed mine countermeasure exercises off the west coast for the next 14 months. Sailing 7 February 1966 Loyalty steamed to the Far East to join U.S. forces assisting South Vietnam to repel Communist aggression. Following a brief stay in the Philippines, she joined operation "Market Time" patrol off the coast of Vietnam early in April.

During Loyalty's first patrol, her crew boarded 348 junks, detained two and arrested 14 enemy smugglers. While the minesweeper was signalling a Junk to heave to on 6 April, she received fire from enemy positions ashore. Loyalty immediately answered this fire and silenced the hostile guns. Two days later, the versatile minesweeper knocked out a Vietcong emplacement which had been firing on a U.S. Army L-19 spotter plane. Rescuing a wounded American adviser from a junk some 2 miles off the coast on 17 April, she ended her patrol 8 days later when she arrived in Hong Kong. She was back on station off South Vietnam 12 May and resumed the task of preventing supplies getting into South Vietnam from the north. Loyalty continued as a unit of task force TF 115 through late 1968, stopping only briefly for respites in Subic Bay or Hong Kong and overhauls in her home port, Long Beach, California. Into 1969, Loyalty remained at Long Beach.

Loyalty was stricken 1 July 1972 and sold for scrapping in December 1973.
