= USS Pledge (MSO-492) =

Minesweeper of the United States Navy

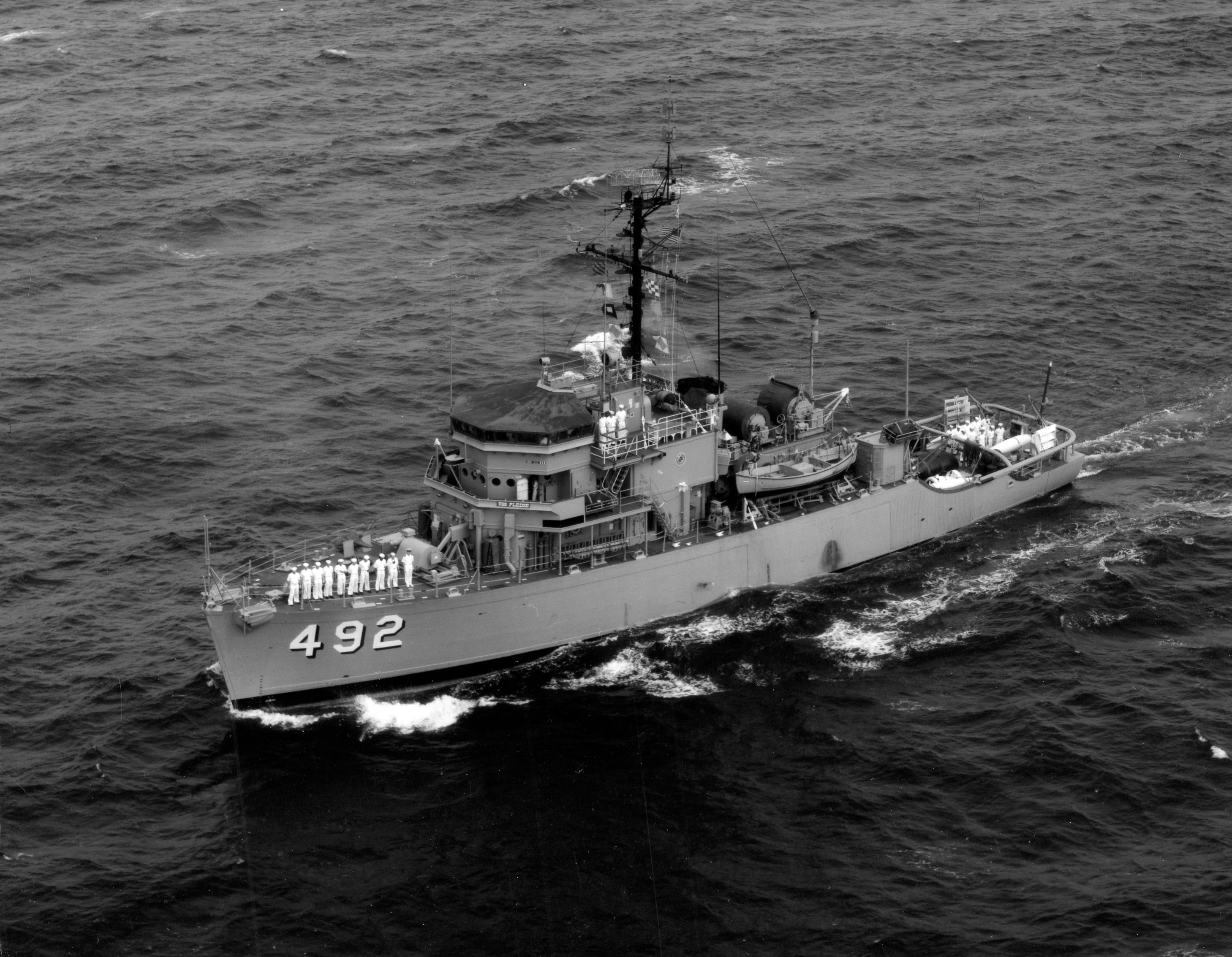

History

United States
- Name: USS Pledge (MSO-492)
- Laid down: 24 June 1954
- Launched: 20 July 1955
- Commissioned: 20 April 1956
- Decommissioned: 31 January 1994
- Stricken: 31 January 1994
- Home port: Long Beach, California
- Fate: Sold to the Republic of China, 9 September 1994

Republic of China
- Name: ROCS Yung Teh (MSO-1309)
- Acquired: 9 September 1994
- Commissioned: 1 March 1995
- Decommissioned: 16 March 2021

General characteristics
- Displacement: 775 tons (full load)
- Length: 172 ft (52 m)
- Beam: 36 ft (11 m)
- Draught: 10 ft (3.0 m)
- Speed: 15 knots (28 km/h)
- Complement: 74
- Armament: one 40 mm mount

USS Pledge (MSO-492) was an Aggressive-class minesweeper acquired by the U.S. Navy.

The second ship to be named Pledge by the Navy, MSO-492, a minesweeper, was laid down on 24 June 1954 by the J. M. Martinac Shipbuilding Corp., Tacoma, Washington, launched 20 July 1955, sponsored by Mrs. T. F. Uitsch, and commissioned 20 April 1956.

== West Coast operations ==
After sea trials, Pledge joined her sister ships at Long Beach, California, 25 May 1956. Following training from July 1956 to February 1957 she operated in WESTPAC March to September 1957. She underwent modification from October 1957 to March 1958. In May-June of 1958 the Pledge participated in training exercises with Canadian minesweepers off the coast of Vancouver Island near Cook Inlet. September of 1959 the Pledge and the other four ships in her division (the Esteem, Gallant and two others) again deployed to Sasebo Japan. Enroute, carrying the division doctor, the Pledge was detached to rendezvous with a submarine where a high line transfer of the doctor was completed (and returned after diagnosing a submariner with appendicitis).

== Vietnam operations ==
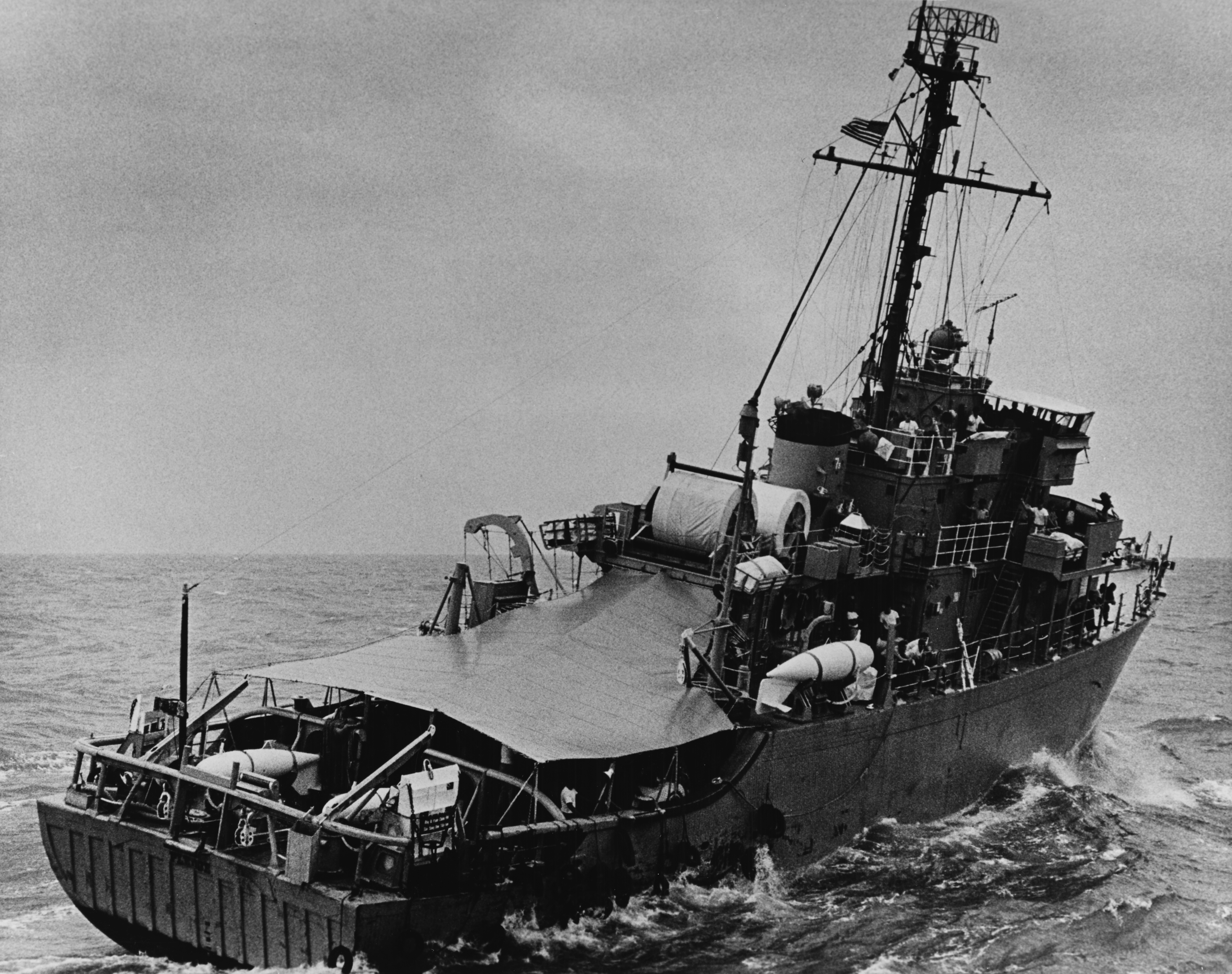
USS Pledge (MSO-492) underway off Vietnam in October 1967

Deployed to WESTPAC 24 August 1961, she visited Bangkok, Thailand, in November, and Saigon, Vietnam, in December. In early 1962 she participated in special training operations at Da Nang, Vietnam until her departure 17 February. Her deployment to WESTPAC, 12 August 1963 included exercises with South Korean ships in October and Nationalist Chinese ships in November. On her next assignment to WESTPAC, 13 August 1965, She performed coastal surveillance duties off the Republic of Vietnam from 18 October to 16 November 1965 and from 18 December into early 1966.

Into 1970 Pledge remained active with the U.S. Pacific Fleet.

== Decommissioning ==
Decommissioned and stricken 31 January 1994, Pledge was sold to Republic of China on 8 March of that year.The Republic of China Navy decommissioned Yung Teh in 16 March 2021.
