= USS Venture (MSO-496) =

Minesweeper of the United States Navy

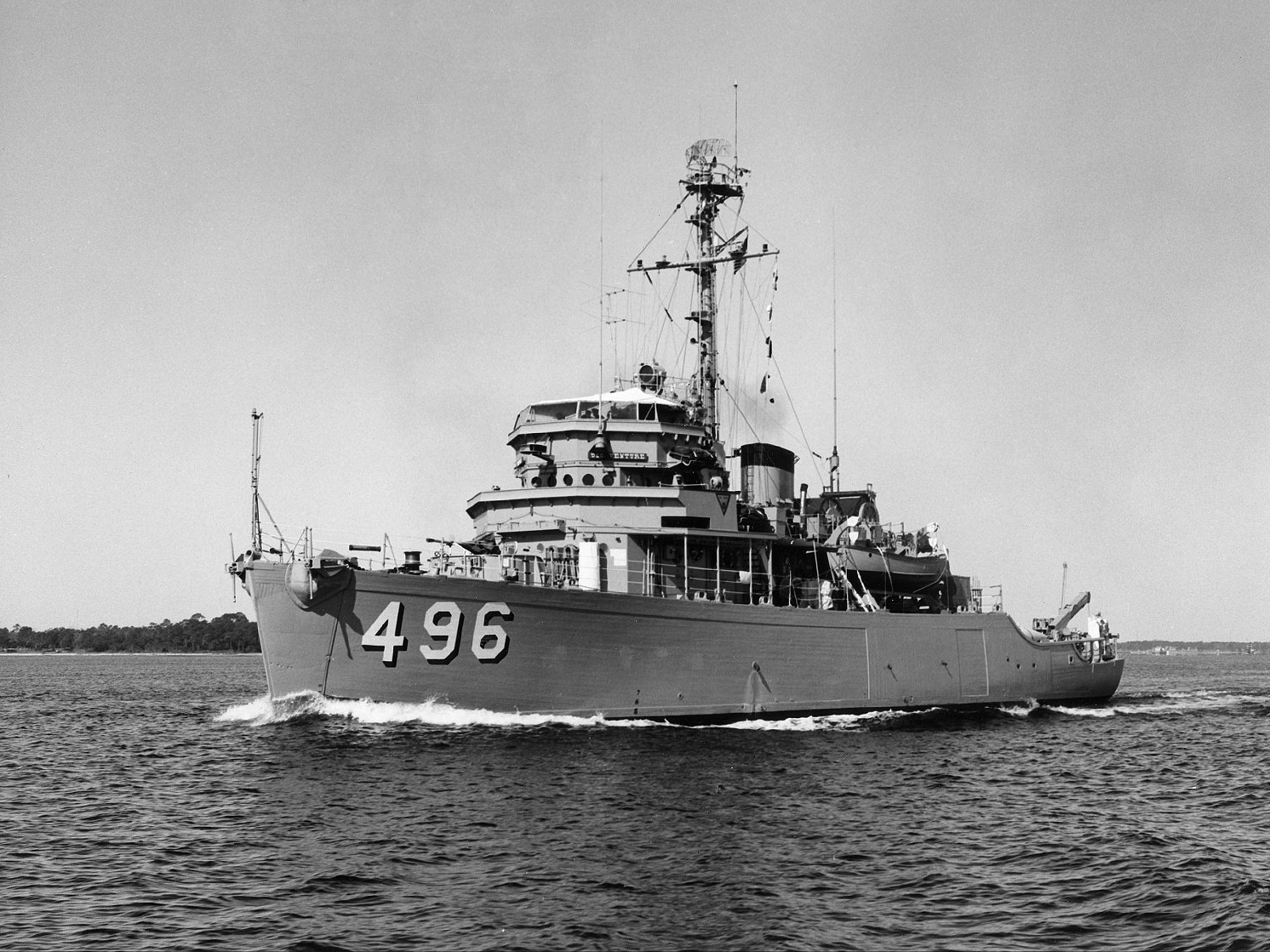
- USS Venture (MSO-496) underway on 7 March 1966

History

United States
- Laid down: 11 January 1955
- Launched: 27 November 1956
- Commissioned: 3 February 1958
- Decommissioned: 2 August 1971
- Stricken: September 1977
- Home port: Charleston, South Carolina; Panama City, Florida
- Fate: Scrapped, 1978

General characteristics
- Displacement: 775 tons (full load)
- Length: 172 ft (52 m)
- Beam: 36 ft (11 m)
- Draught: 10 ft (3.0 m)
- Speed: 15 knots
- Complement: 74
- Armament: one 40 mm mount

USS Venture (AM-496/MSO-496) was an Aggressive-class minesweeper acquired by the U.S. Navy for the task of removing mines that had been placed in the water to prevent the safe passage of ships.

The third ship to be named Venture by the Navy, MSO-496 was laid down on 11 January 1955 at Ft. Lauderdale, Florida, by Broward Marine Inc. as AM-496; redesignated MSO-496 on 7 February 1955; launched on 27 November 1956; sponsored by Mrs. Leroy Williams, wife of the Governor of Florida; and commissioned on 3 February 1958.

== East Coast service ==
Following shakedown training at Guantanamo Bay, Cuba, during March and April, Venture conducted local minesweeping operations out of Charleston, South Carolina, until late June at which time she entered the Charleston Naval Shipyard for post-shakedown availability. That repair period lasted until 1 December when she began preparations to deploy to the Mediterranean Sea. Although her home port was changed from Charleston, South Carolina, to Panama City, Florida, on New Year's Day 1959, the minesweeper embarked upon her first Mediterranean cruise from the former port on 9 January as the flagship of Mine Division (MinDiv) 81. After a routine tour of duty with the U.S. 6th Fleet, Venture returned to Charleston on 30 May for a tender availability at the naval shipyard and normal operations out of Charleston until late summer.

== Venture changes homeports to Panama City, Florida ==
On 3 August 1959, the minesweeper departed Charleston, bound finally for Panama City, Florida, her new home port. For the next dozen years, she served the Navy's Mine Defense Laboratory located there. For the remainder of her career, the minesweeper and her division mates helped that institution to develop mine warfare countermeasures. When not operating under the auspices of the laboratory, she performed mine warfare training exercises under the direction of the Commander, Mine Squadron 8. In addition, she periodically provided services in support of the research and developmental work carried on by the Operational Test and Evaluation Force—frequently in conjunction with the Naval Mine Defense Laboratory mentioned above—and by the Naval Ships Research and Development Center (popularly dubbed the David Taylor Model Basin) located at Carderock, Maryland.

== Second deployment with the Sixth Fleet ==
During that time period, Venture departed the immediate area of the eastern Gulf of Mexico infrequently. On occasion, she made visits to Norfolk, Virginia, Charleston, and Mobile, Alabama, but those calls either were very brief or were made strictly for the purpose of repairs and availabilities. Early in 1969, however, she did clear the Panama City area for a tour of duty overseas. Between 10 January and 16 June 1969, she made her second and last deployment to the 6th Fleet—almost a decade to the day after she had begun her first Mediterranean mission.

== Mine countermeasures duties ==
Back in Panama City by mid-June, the minesweeper resumed duty assisting in the development of mine countermeasures. That task carried the warship through the last two years of her naval career. Just before she began inactivation preparations, she became flagship of MinDiv 21 when the Atlantic Fleet Mine Force was reorganized; and MinDiv 81 was transformed into MinDiv 21. Venture began preparations for her inactivation on 3 May 1971 at Charleston. She was decommissioned there on 2 August 1971 and, on 10 November, was berthed with the Norfolk Group, Atlantic Reserve Fleet.

== Decommissioning ==
In September 1977, Venture's name was struck from the Navy list. She was sold for scrapping for $27,019 in 1978.
