= USS Fearless (MSO-442) =

Minesweeper of the United States Navy

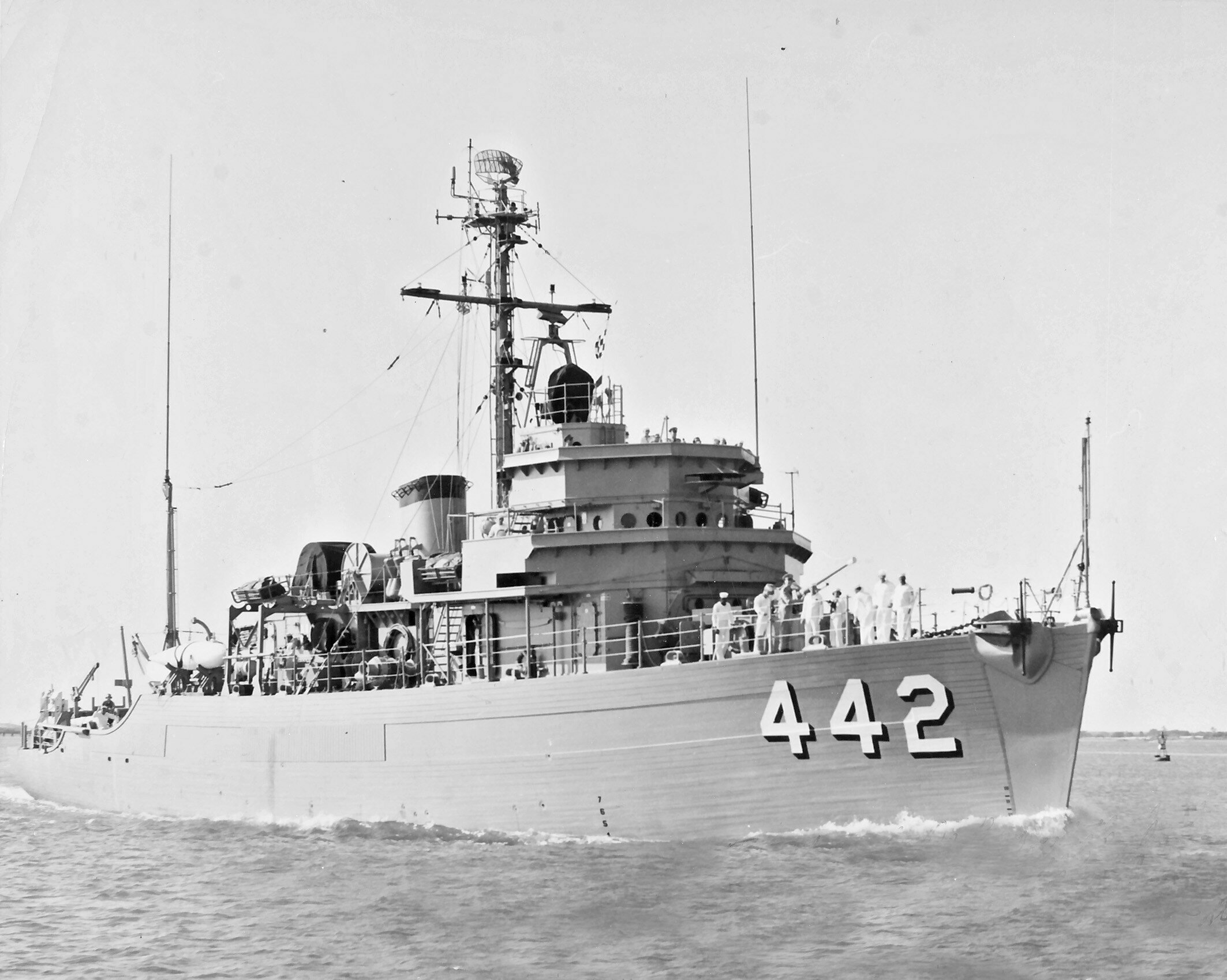
- Fearless in 1956

History

United States
- Name: USS Fearless
- Builder: Higgins Industries, New Orleans, Louisiana
- Laid down: 23 July 1952
- Launched: 17 July 1953
- Commissioned: 22 September 1954, as AM-442
- Decommissioned: 23 October 1990
- Reclassified: MSO-442 (Ocean Minesweeper), 7 February 1955
- Stricken: 28 October 1990
- Fate: Sold for scrap, 1 December 1992

General characteristics
- Class & type: Aggressive-class minesweeper
- Displacement: 853 long tons (867 t) full load
- Length: 172 ft (52 m)
- Beam: 35 ft (11 m)
- Draft: 10 ft (3 m)
- Propulsion: 4 × aluminum block Waukesha diesel engines, 2,400 bhp (1,790 kW); 2 × shafts; 2 × controllable pitch propellers
- Speed: 14 knots (26 km/h; 16 mph)
- Complement: Active: 7 officers, 70 enlisted; Naval Reserve Force: 5 officers, 52 enlisted plus 25 reserve
- Sensors & processing systems: AN/SQQ-14 mine countermeasures sonar
- Armament: 1 × twin 20 mm gun mount; 2 × .50 cal (12.7 mm) twin machine guns

USS Fearless (AM/MSO-442) was an Aggressive-class minesweeper. She was the third United States Navy ship to carry the name.

Fearless was launched on 17 July 1953 by Higgins, Inc., New Orleans, Louisiana; sponsored by Mrs. A. J. Higgins, Jr.; and commissioned on 22 September 1954. Authorized as AM-442; she was reclassified as an Ocean Minesweeper, MSO-442, 7 February 1955.

== Service history ==
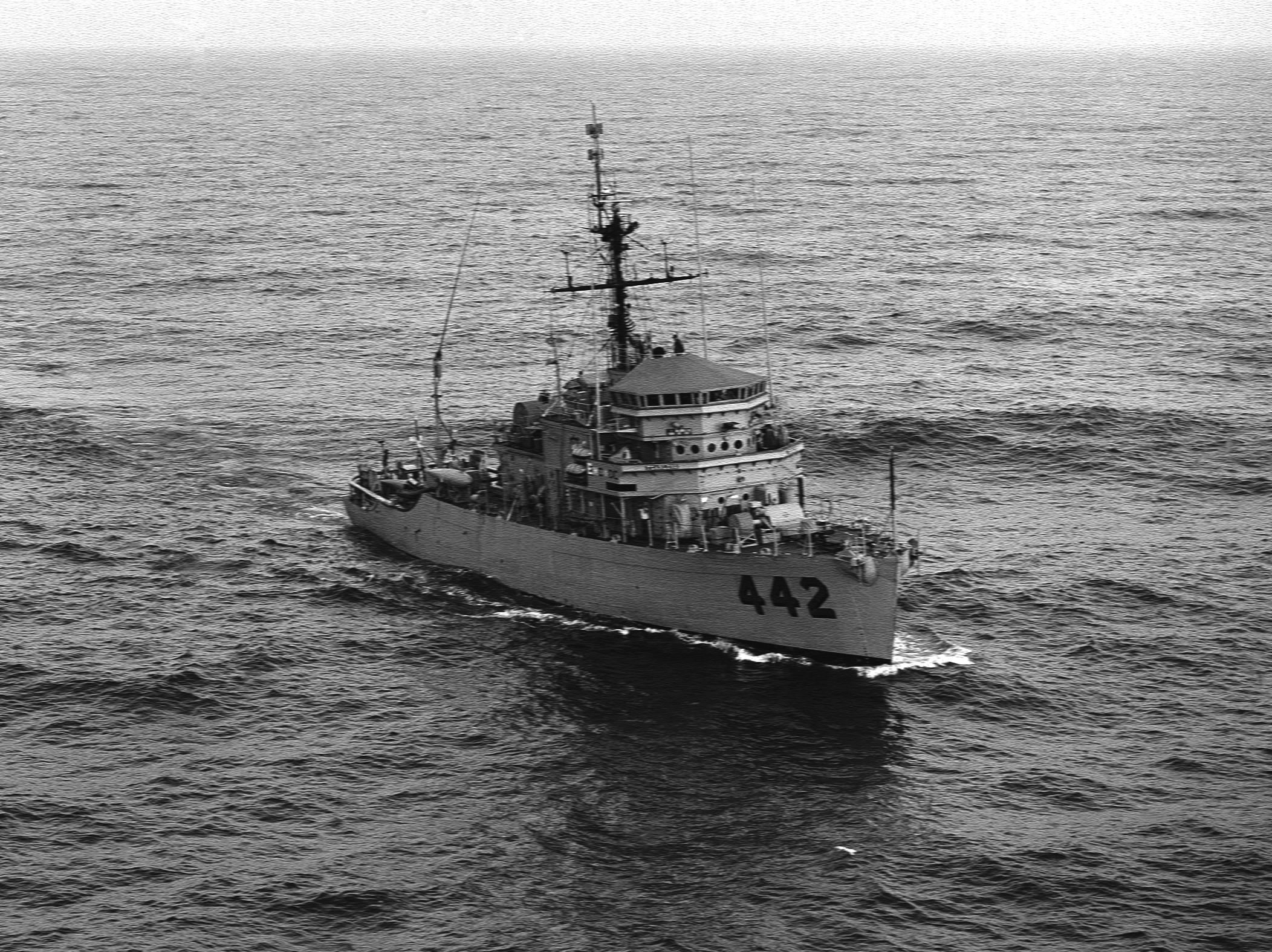
USS Fearless (MSO-442) c. 1988

With Charleston, South Carolina as her home port, Fearless operated through 1960 on training operations, experiments and tests, and in exercises along the coast and in the Caribbean. Every other year from 1955 she sailed to the Mediterranean for duty with the 6th Fleet, joining in North Atlantic Treaty Organisation exercises and visiting European ports. In the spring of 1956, she conducted joint exercises with ships of the Royal Canadian Navy, and through that summer experimented with controllable pitch propellers and mine-countermeasures equipment at Charleston and Port Everglades, Florida.

In August 1987 Fearless was towed by Grapple (ARS-53) to the Persian Gulf in support of Operation Earnest Will, arriving in mid-September. Full scale mine countermeasures operations began in November of that year. Fearless remained in theatre at least into 1988, clearing mines in the Persian Gulf. Her eligible crew earned the Armed Forces Expeditionary Medal for her service.

Fearless operated out of Charleston, South Carolina during her entire career. She decommissioned on 23 October 1990, and was struck five days later. She was sold by the Defense Reutilization and Marketing Service for scrapping, 1 December 1992 to Seawitch Salvage, Baltimore, Maryland for $6,000.

Fearless received four Navy "E" Ribbons, one Meritorious Unit Commendation, one Navy Unit Commendation and two Secretary of the Navy Letter of Commendations during her career.
