= USS Exploit (AM-440) =

Minesweeper of the United States Navy

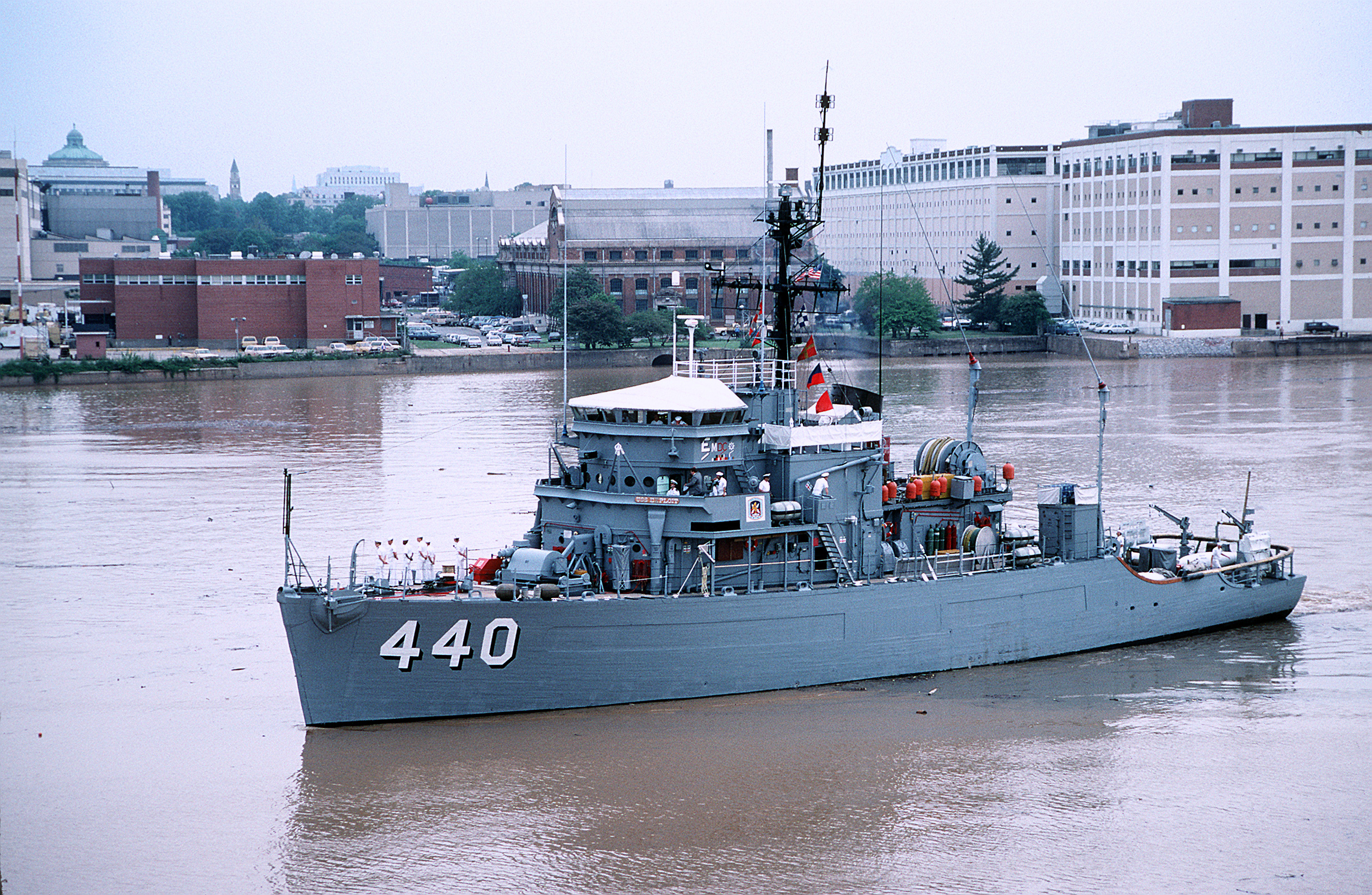

History

United States
- Name: Exploit
- Builder: Higgins Inc., New Orleans, Louisiana
- Laid down: 28 December 1951
- Launched: 10 April 1953
- Commissioned: 31 March 1954
- Decommissioned: 16 December 1993
- Reclassified: MSO-440 7 February 1955
- Stricken: 28 March 1994
- Identification: AM-440
- Fate: Sold, 4 December 2000

General characteristics
- Class & type: Aggressive-class minesweeper
- Displacement: 775 tons
- Length: 172 ft (52.43 m)
- Beam: 36 ft (10.97 m)
- Draft: 10 ft (3.05 m)
- Propulsion: 4 × Packard ID1700 diesel engines, replaced by 4 Waukasha Motors Co. diesels, two shafts, two controllable pitch propellers.
- Speed: 14 knots (26 km/h; 16 mph)
- Complement: 70
- Armament: 1 × 40 mm gun; 2 × .50 cal (12.7 mm) mg

USS Exploit (MSO-440) was an Aggressive-class minesweeper. The ship was laid down on 28 December 1951 at Higgins Inc., New Orleans, Louisiana and launched on 10 April 1953. The vessel was commissioned USS Exploit (AM-440) on 31 March 1954 and redesignated as an ocean minesweeper MSO-440 on 7 February 1955.

As built the vessel was armed one single 40 mm gun mount on the bow and two .50 caliber machine guns. The ship's final weapons configuration replaced the bow gun with one twin 20 mm gun mount while maintaining the two .50 caliber machine guns.

== Service history ==
USS Exploit arrived at Charleston, South Carolina, her home port on 13 March 1955, and began her participation in major fleet exercises, and local and Caribbean Sea training. In 1954, 1957, and 1958, she served with the U.S. 6th Fleet in the Mediterranean Sea, participating in exercises and visiting a variety of ports. Her stateside schedule through June 1960 included work in experimental development of mine warfare and defense in Florida waters. On 28 October 1960 USS Exploit again sailed for duty with the U.S. 6th Fleet and remained there through the end of the year.

Exploit was decommissioned on 16 December 1993 and laid up in the Atlantic Reserve Fleet, Naval Inactive Ship Maintenance Facility at Portsmouth, Virginia. The ship was struck from the Naval Register on 28 March 1994 and sold on 4 December 2000 to Baltimore Marine Industries, Baltimore, Maryland, for scrapping.
