= USS Energy (AM-436) =

Minesweeper of the United States Navy

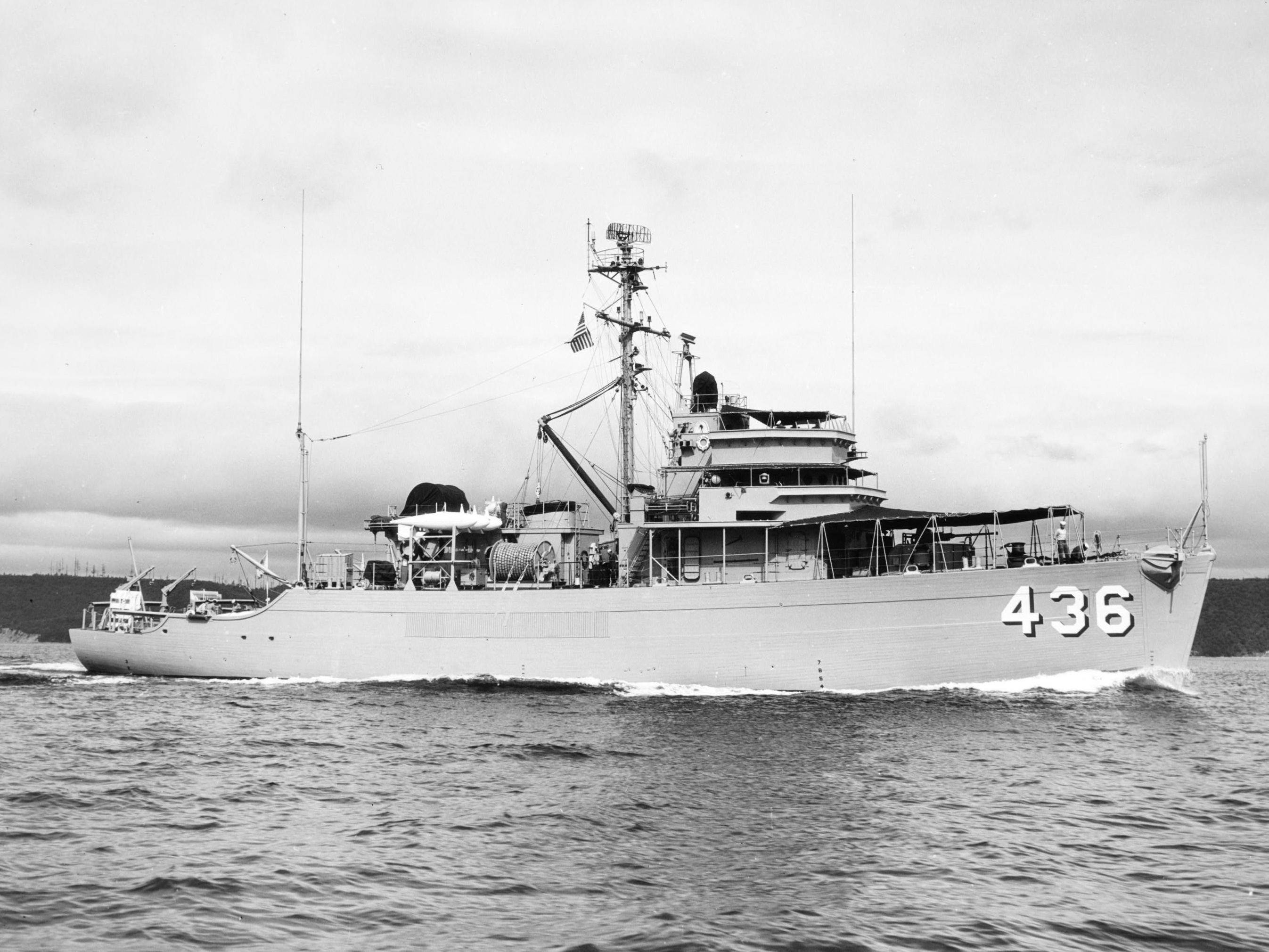
- USS Energy (MSO-436) underway in July 1954.

History

United States
- Name: USS Energy (AM-436)
- Laid down: 3 March 1952
- Launched: 13 February 1953
- Commissioned: 16 July 1954
- Reclassified: MSO-436, 7 February 1955
- Decommissioned: 5 July 1977
- Home port: Long Beach, California
- Fate: loaned to Philippines, 5 July 1972
- Acquired: returned from Philippines, 1 July 1977
- Stricken: 1 July 1977
- Fate: Sold for scrapping, 8 July 1977

History

Philippines
- Name: BRP Davao del Norte (PM-91)
- Acquired: 5 July 1972
- Fate: returned to U.S., 1 July 1977

General characteristics
- Class & type: Aggressive-class minesweeper
- Displacement: 620 tons
- Length: 172 ft (52 m)
- Beam: 36 ft (11 m)
- Draught: 10 ft (3.0 m)
- Speed: 16 knots
- Complement: 74
- Armament: one 40 mm mount

USS Energy (AM-436/MSO-436) was an Agile-class minesweeper acquired by the U.S. Navy for the task of removing mines that had been placed in the water to prevent the safe passage of ships.

The second ship to be named Energy by the Navy, AM-436 was launched 13 February 1953 by J. M. Martinac Shipbuilding Co., Tacoma, Washington; sponsored by Mrs. A M. Baughman; and commissioned 16 July 1954. She was reclassified MSO-436, 7 February 1955.

== West Coast operations ==
Energy arrived at Long Beach, California, her home port, 3 August 1954, and began training along the U.S. West Coast with the ships of her division. On 4 January 1956, she sailed for her first tour of duty in the western Pacific Ocean, taking part in a large-scale exercise off Iwo Jima, and training with ships of the Republic of Korea and the Republic of China. Returning to her home port 15 June, she cruised along the west coast during the next year, conducting sonar tests and serving as a schoolship for officers of the Thailand Navy.

== Matsu and Quemoy crisis ==
During her second deployment to the Far East, from 2 June 1958 to 6 January 1959, Energy stood by at Taiwan during the crisis brought on by renewed Communist shelling of Quemoy and Matsu, and again exercised with Chinese minesweepers.

Specialized mine warfare exercises and general training with the fleet along with visits to various west ports, were conducted through the summer of 1960. For the remainder of the year Energy served with the U.S. 7th Fleet in Far East waters.

USS Energy MSO 436 was used along with other MSO class of ships during the Vietnam war to patrol the Vietnam coast and intercept and search Vietnamese small vessels during operation Market Time. Operation Market Time was essential to stop small Vietnamese vessels such as fishing boats from moving weapons. Energy used Qui Nhon as a meeting place for other MSOs and for R&R. The MSO was a class of ship made of wood.

== Final status ==
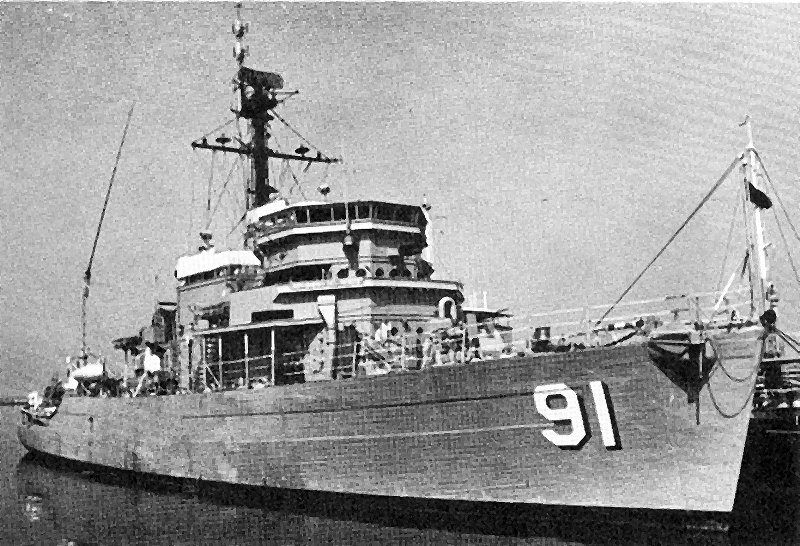
Energy after transfer to the Philippines in the 1970s as Davao del Norte (PM 91).

Energy was loaned to the Philippine Navy as Davao de Norte 5 July 1972. Energy was later returned and stricken 1 July 1977, she was subsequently sold for scrapping on 8 July 1977.
