= USS Persistent (MSO-491) =

Minesweeper of the United States Navy

History

United States
- Name: Persistent
- Builder: J.M. Martinac Shipbuilding Corp.
- Laid down: 17 June 1954
- Launched: 23 April 1955
- Commissioned: 3 February 1956
- Decommissioned: 1 July 1971
- Stricken: 1 August 1974
- Identification: Hull number: AM-491/MSO-491
- Fate: Sold to Spain, 1 August 1974

Spain
- Name: Guadalquivir
- Acquired: 1 August 1974
- Identification: Pennant number: M43
- Fate: unknown

General characteristics
- Class & type: Aggressive-class minesweeper
- Displacement: 775 tons (full load)
- Length: 172 ft (52 m)
- Beam: 36 ft (11 m)
- Draft: 10 ft (3.0 m)
- Speed: 15 knots (28 km/h; 17 mph)
- Complement: 74
- Armament: 1 × twin 20 mm gun; 2 × .50 cal (12.7 mm) twin machine guns

USS Persistent (AM-491/MSO-491) was an Aggressive-class minesweeper acquired by the U.S. Navy for the task of removing naval mines that had been placed in the water to prevent the safe passage of ships.

The second ship to be named Persistent by the Navy, the vessel was laid down 17 June 1954 as AM-491 by J.M. Martinac Shipbuilding Corp., Tacoma, Washington; reclassified MSO–491 on 7 February 1955; launched 23 April 1955; sponsored by Mrs. M.S. Erdahl; and commissioned 3 February 1956.

== West Coast operations ==
Following Pacific coast shakedown, Persistent reported for duty to Commander, Pacific Fleet, 2 March 1956 and was designated flagship for Mine Division 91 the same day. In September 1956, she was modified for advanced sound reduction to protect against acoustic mines.

In August 1957, she deployed to WestPac as part of Mine Countermeasures Group, U.S. 7th Fleet. After return to Long Beach, California, for regular overhaul in February 1958 and completion of type training that year, she engaged in research at the Navy Acoustic Range, Puget Sound, September 1959. Later that year she measured ocean currents under assignment to Scripps Institute of Oceanography.

After another deployment to WestPac in 1960, she returned to California in July. After type training in 1961, she deployed to WestPac in January 1962, assisting in the training of South Vietnamese sailors from January to August. After domestic operations in 1963, she deployed annually to WestPac from 1964 to 1970. She returned from her last WestPac early in 1971. Until 1971 she remained active with the U.S. Pacific Fleet.

== Decommissioning ==
Persistent was decommissioned on 1 July 1971 and struck from the Navy list on 1 August 1974. In 1974, she was sold to Spain, which named her Guadalquivir (M43).
