= USS Fortify (AM-446) =

Minesweeper of the United States Navy

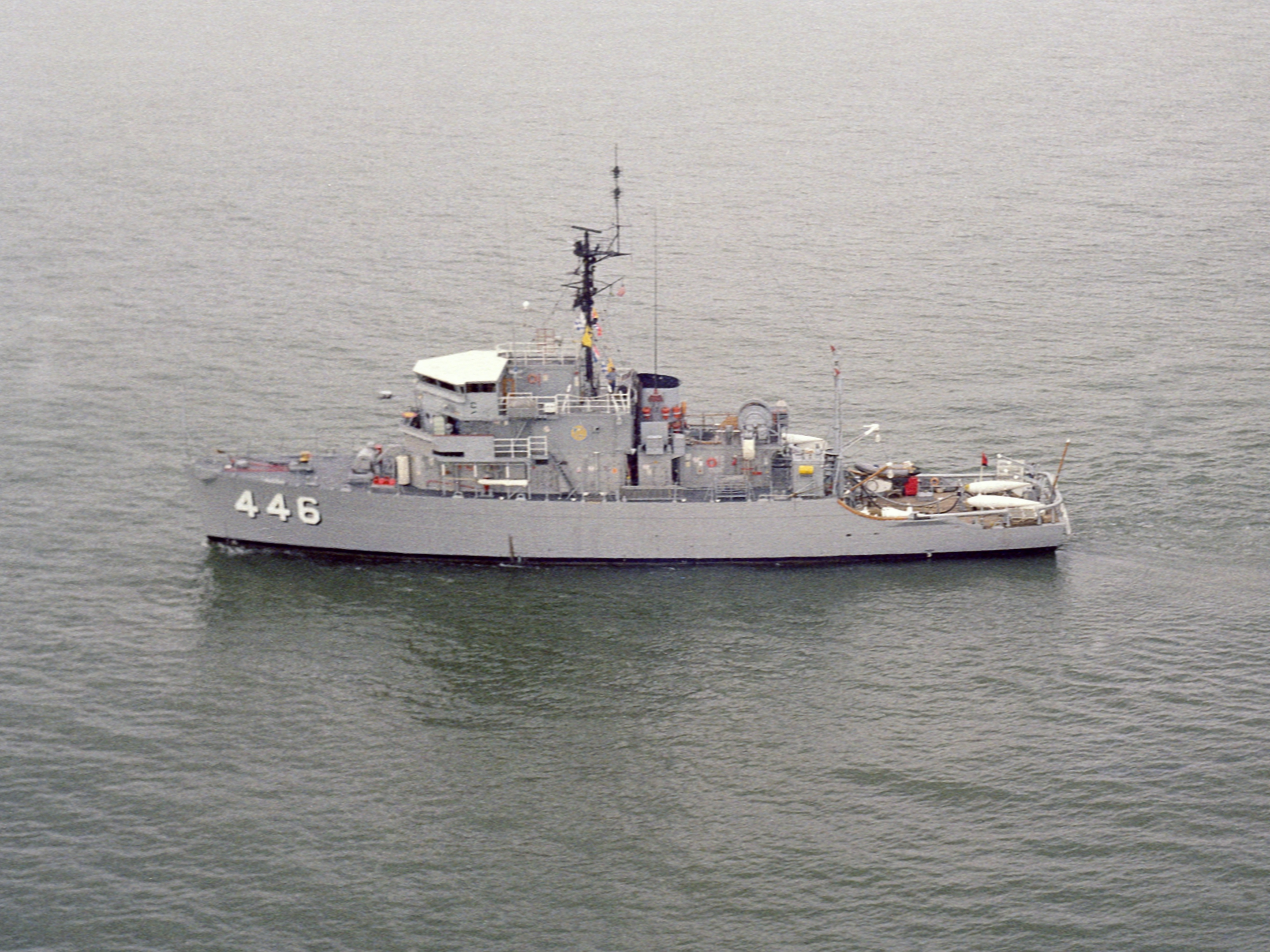
- USS Fortify underway in the Atlantic Ocean on 6 July 1981

History

United States
- Name: Fortify
- Builder: Seattle Shipbuilding and Drydocking Company, Seattle, Washington
- Laid down: 30 November 1951
- Launched: 14 February 1953
- Commissioned: 16 July 1954
- Decommissioned: 31 August 1992
- Reclassified: MSO-446 on 7 February 1955
- Stricken: 9 March 1994
- Home port: Long Beach, California and later Little Creek, Virginia
- Fate: Sold for scrapping in 2000

General characteristics
- Class & type: Agile-class minesweeper
- Displacement: 620 tons
- Length: 172 ft (52.43 m)
- Beam: 36 ft (10.97 m)
- Draught: 10 ft (3.05 m)
- Propulsion: Originally fitted with Packards. Replaced by four Waukesha Model L1616DSIN diesel engines (Each were 600 Horsepower, 12 cylinder, 1616 cubic inches, Turbocharged, Intercooled, Non-magnetic (aluminum block)), two shafts, two controllable pitch propellers, 2,400 Shaft Horsepower(total)
- Speed: 16 knots
- Complement: 74
- Sensors & processing systems: 1 AN/SQQ-14 Variable depth sonar
- Armament: one 40 mm mount, later replaced by two 50 cal mounts on the pilot house level, one on each wing
- Notes: Acoustic devices included one 6-Baker and one 4-Victor. EMS-4 Degaussing System. While homeported at Little Creek, VA, was part of Mine Squadron 12 (COMINERON 12 was located in Charleston, SC).

USS Fortify (AM-446/MSO-446) was an Agile-class minesweeper acquired by the U.S. Navy for the task of removing Contact, Magnetic, and Acoustic mines that had been placed in the water to prevent the safe passage of ships.

Fortify was launched 14 February 1953 by Seattle Shipbuilding and Drydocking Company, Seattle, Washington; sponsored by Mrs. Donald Scobie; and commissioned 16 July 1954.

== West Coast operations ==
Fortify first arrived at Long Beach, California, her home port, 3 August 1954, and in December became flagship of Mine Division 92. Fortify was reclassified MSO-446 on 7 February 1955.

During her first tour of duty in the Far East, from 1 July 1955 to 17 February 1956, Fortify took part in exercises with Japanese, Korean, and Chinese minesweepers, as well as fleet operations in Japanese waters. Her training activities and participation in exercises along the west coast prepared her for additional tours of duty in the Far East where she participated in Exercise "Bulwark" in the Philippines in March 1958 and Thailand in 1960.

USS Fortify was deployed off the coast of South Vietnam in 1962–1963 in the Tonkin Gulf. Its minesweeping gear was removed and an electronic countermeasures "box" was installed on the fantail. The ship was involved in monitoring and intercepting Viet Cong radio transmissions and it vectored South Vietnamese gunboats to interdict large junks coming down the coast from the north that were suspected of furnishing arms and ammunition to cadres of Viet Cong in the south. During its monitoring activities, the ship was frequently the subject of sorties by North Vietnamese torpedo boats who would bear down on the ship in the late night - early morning hours. However, the torpedo boats never actually attacked but veered away after the ship went to general quarters. These are the same torpedo boats that purportedly "attacked" USS Maddox in the first Tonkin Gulf Incident.

USS Fortify participated in Operation Market Time Patrol (coastal surveillance force) from 1968 through the end of the war. During patrol Fortify was responsible for boarding and searching South Vietnamese fishing junks for smuggled weapons and other contraband intended to aid the Viet Cong. In July 1971 Fortify embarked on a WestPac deployment for coastal patrol in the coastal waters of South Vietnam and returned to her new home port at the Naval Base Guam upon completion of her tour. After the mining of Haiphong Harbor in North Vietnam by the United States, Fortify was placed on alert and was sent underway from Guam to operate in the coastal waters of South Vietnam off of the coast of Da Nang as a precautionary countermeasure.

The minesweeper was assigned to participate in Operation End sweep after the war (removing mines laid by United States in Haiphong Harbor in North Vietnam and other water ways). Operation End sweep was one of the final military operations to end the war in Vietnam. The crew of USS Fortify crew earned the Meritorious Unit Commendation for their service.

Fortify was decommissioned on 31 August 1992 and struck from the Navy list on 9 March 1994. She was sold for scrapping in 2000.
