= Operation End Sweep =

Part of the Vietnam War (1973)

- Part of the Vietnam War
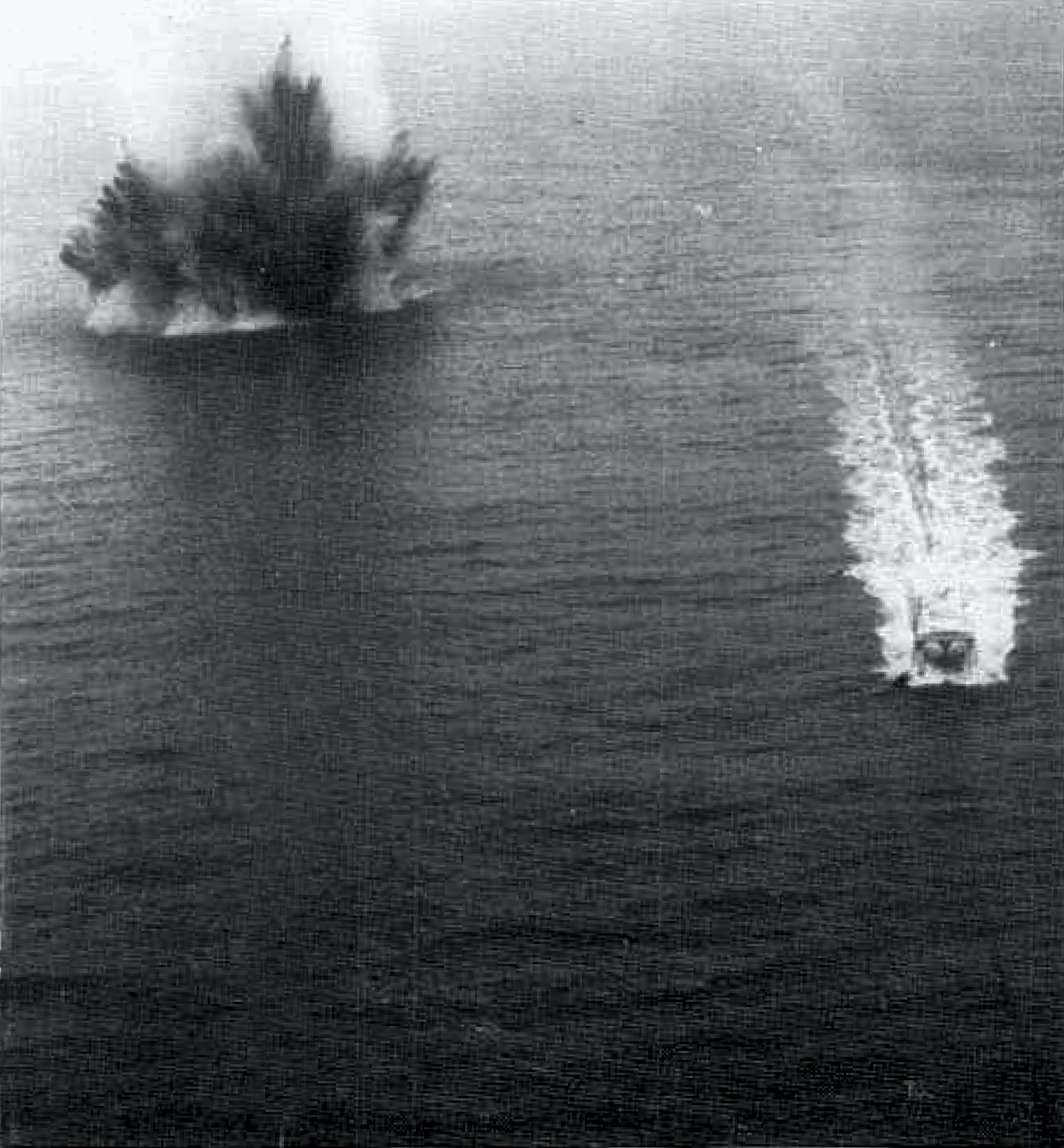
- A naval mine explodes in Haiphong Harbor on 9 March 1973 during Operation End Sweep, photographed by the automatic mine locator camera aboard an American CH-53A Sea Stallion helicopter. It is believed to be the only explosion of a mine during End Sweep. The Mark 105 hydrofoil minesweeping sled the helicopter is towing is at right
- Operational scope: Minesweeping
- Planned by: U.S. Navy Mine Warfare Force
- Objective: Clear mines from North Vietnamese waters
- Date: 6 February – 27 July 1973
- Executed by: U.S. Navy; U.S. Marine Corps
- Outcome: Operational success

Operation End Sweep was a United States Navy and United States Marine Corps operation to remove naval mines from Haiphong harbor and other coastal and inland waterways in North Vietnam between February and July 1973. The operation fulfilled an American obligation under the Paris Peace Accord of January 1973, which ended direct American participation in the Vietnam War. It also was the first operational deployment of a U.S. Navy air mine countermeasures capability.

== Background ==
The United States had largely disengaged from the Vietnam War when North Vietnam launched its Easter Offensive into South Vietnam in March 1972. In response, the United States Air Force and U.S. Navy launched Operation Linebacker, a major bombing offensive against North Vietnam. In addition, President of the United States Richard Nixon ordered the Commander-in-Chief, United States Pacific Fleet, Admiral Bernard A. Clarey, and the Commander-in-Chief, United States Seventh Fleet, Vice Admiral James L. Holloway, to begin the Operation Pocket Money mining campaign against Haiphong and other North Vietnamese ports. The mining campaign, by U.S. Navy and United States Marine Corps attack aircraft from American aircraft carriers, began on 8 May 1972, and over the next several months laid thousands of mines in North Vietnamese waters.

Eventually, North Vietnam and the United States negotiated an end to the war and signed the Paris Peace Accords on 27 January 1973. A protocol to the agreement called for the United States to neutralize American mines in North Vietnam's coastal and inland waterways.

== Preparations ==
Under the Hague Convention of 1907, the United States was required to eliminate the mine threat it had created after the end of hostilities. Accordingly, the U.S. Navy's Mine Warfare Force (MINEWARFOR) began planning for removal of the mines as soon as Nixon ordered the mining campaign to begin. In order to ease post-war minesweeping, only mines that could be cleared by magnetic sweeps were used, and the vast majority of mines laid were programmed either to self-destruct or render themselves inert after a specified period of time. Of course, the U.S. Navy also knew generally where the mines had been laid, although the inherent inaccuracy of aerial minelaying meant that the precise location of each mine was not known.

Rear Admiral Brian McCauley became Commander, Mine Warfare Force, and Commander, Task Force 78, in September 1972. Task Force 78 was designated as Mine Countermeasures Force, U.S. Seventh Fleet, and was created for the upcoming minesweeping operation that would become known as End Sweep.

Minesweeping equipment and U.S. Navy personnel trained in minesweeping both were in short supply, so, in order to minimize the danger of mine explosions to American personnel and equipment, Task Force 78 planners devised an operational scheme in which minesweeping was limited to areas in which the mines already had rendered themselves inert. If all mines known to be in an area also were known to have passed their self-sterilization dates, Task Force 78 planned to conduct a check sweep of a few passes; if it was not clear that all mines in a given area had become inert, a more thorough clearance sweep was to be used.

In the United States, the Chief of Naval Materiel, Admiral Isaac C. Kidd, Jr., organized a Mine Warfare Program Office charged with controlling scientific and technical support to End Sweep. The program office ensured that resources were allocated to the operation that allowed the rapid development of shallow-water minesweeper gear and precision navigation and locating systems, the latter providing minesweeping forces with an improved capability to determine the configuration of a minefield and to adjust their daily operations accordingly.

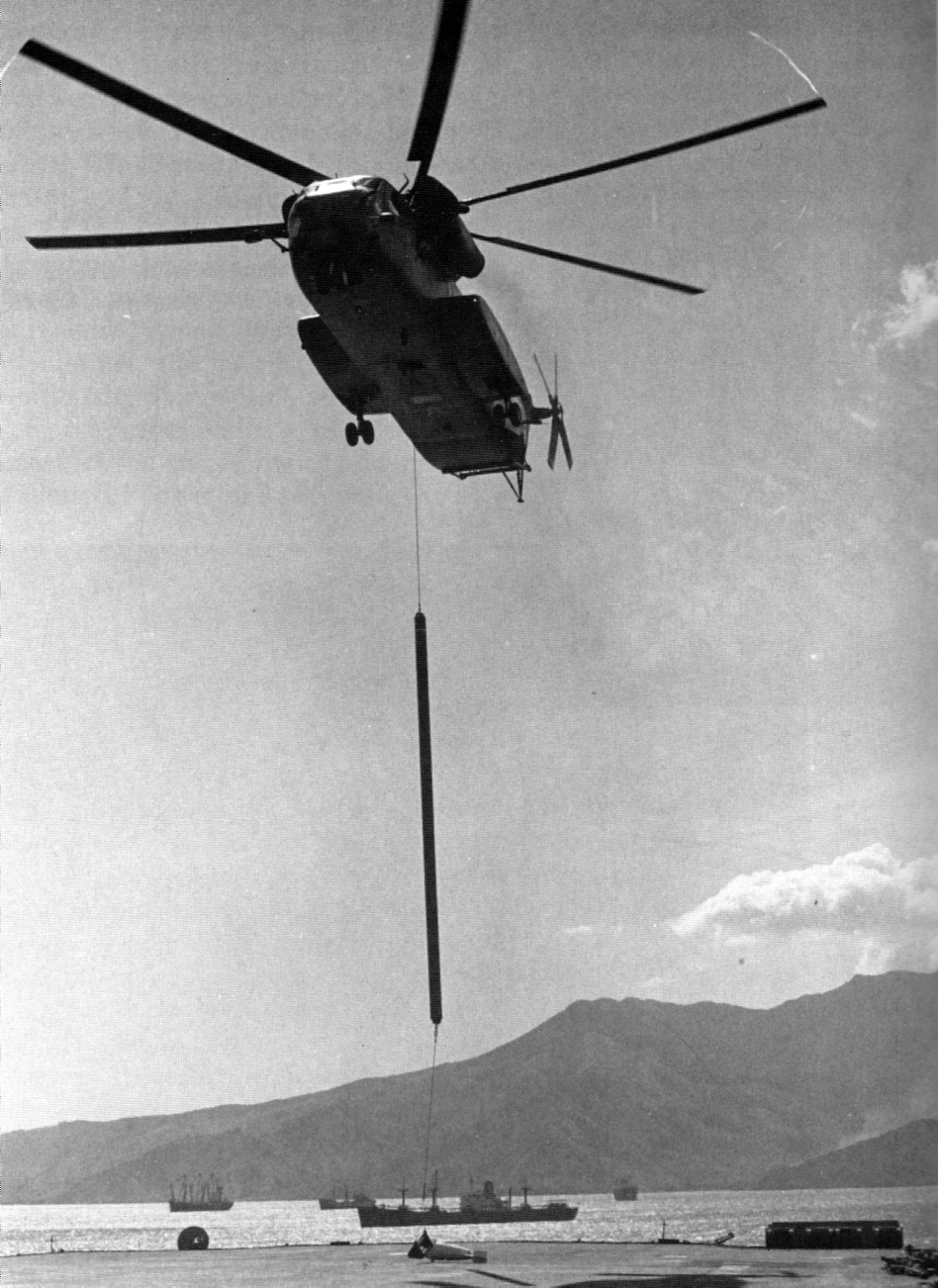
A Task Force 78 CH-53D Sea Stallion from the amphibious assault ship USS Inchon (LPH-12) lifts a Magnetic Orange Pipe (MOP) mine countermeasure device during training at Subic Bay in the Philippines.

Ten ocean minesweepers (MSOs) were assigned to Task Force 78 to sweep deep-water approaches to North Vietnamese ports and inland waterways and to serve as helicopter control vessels. In addition, the tank landing ship USS Washtenaw County (LST-1166) was modified in Japan between November 1972 and February 1973 to serve in End Sweep as a "special device minesweeper," redesignated MSS-2. As such, she was intended to be used for check sweeps through waters which presumably were clear of active mines to ensure that passage indeed was safe. She was pumped full of polyurethane foam so that she would not sink if she struck a mine, was equipped with padding to protect her all-volunteer skeleton crew, and was modified so that her entire crew of six could remain topside during her minesweeping runs, ensuring that they would be blown overboard if she struck a mine rather than injured or killed by slamming into the overhead anywhere below decks.

The Navy's newly created air mine countermeasures capability resided entirely in the CH-53 Sea Stallion helicopters of Helicopter Mine Countermeasures Squadron 12 (HM-12), all of which were assigned to the operation. In addition, one detachment each from the Marine Corps's Marine Heavy Helicopter Squadron 463 (HMH-463) and Marine Medium Helicopter Squadron 164 (HMM-164) provided a total of 24 more CH-53s. The helicopters practiced for the operation off Charleston, South Carolina, where it was discovered that the Marine Corps pilots' inexperience in towing the heavy Mark 105 hydrofoil minesweeping sleds posed a risk to the personnel and equipment involved, a particularly unacceptable risk because of the scarcity and expense of the sleds. As a result, a scientist devised a buoyant, magnetized pipe filled with styrofoam which any helicopter pilot could tow easily. Painted orange, the new device became known as the Magnetic Orange Pipe (MOP).

== Operations ==
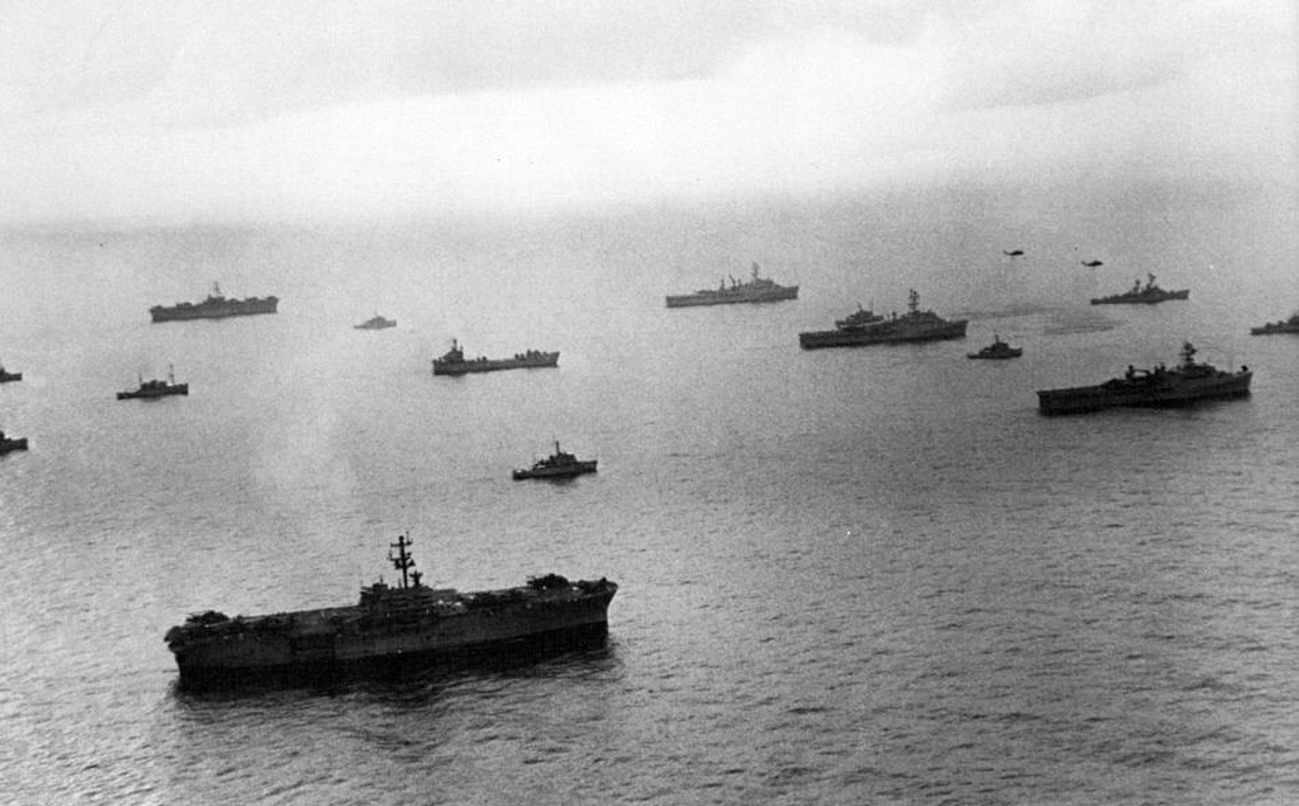
Ships of Task Force 78 in the Gulf of Tonkin, heading for North Vietnam to conduct Operation End Sweep.

Task Force 78 was activated as a unit of the Seventh Fleet on 24 November 1972, while peace talks still were underway in Paris, and the ships and helicopter units making it up secretly gathered in the Philippines. The talks broke down in December 1972, however, so the task force awaited further developments into January 1973 while its helicopter crews practiced towing their minesweeping equipment in Subic Bay.

On 28 January 1973 – the day after the peace accords were signed – Task Force 78 departed the Philippines for Haiphong. McCauley met in Haiphong with his North Vietnamese opposite, Colonel Hoang Huu Thai, on 5 February 1973 to coordinate North Vietnamese actions with those of Task Force 78.

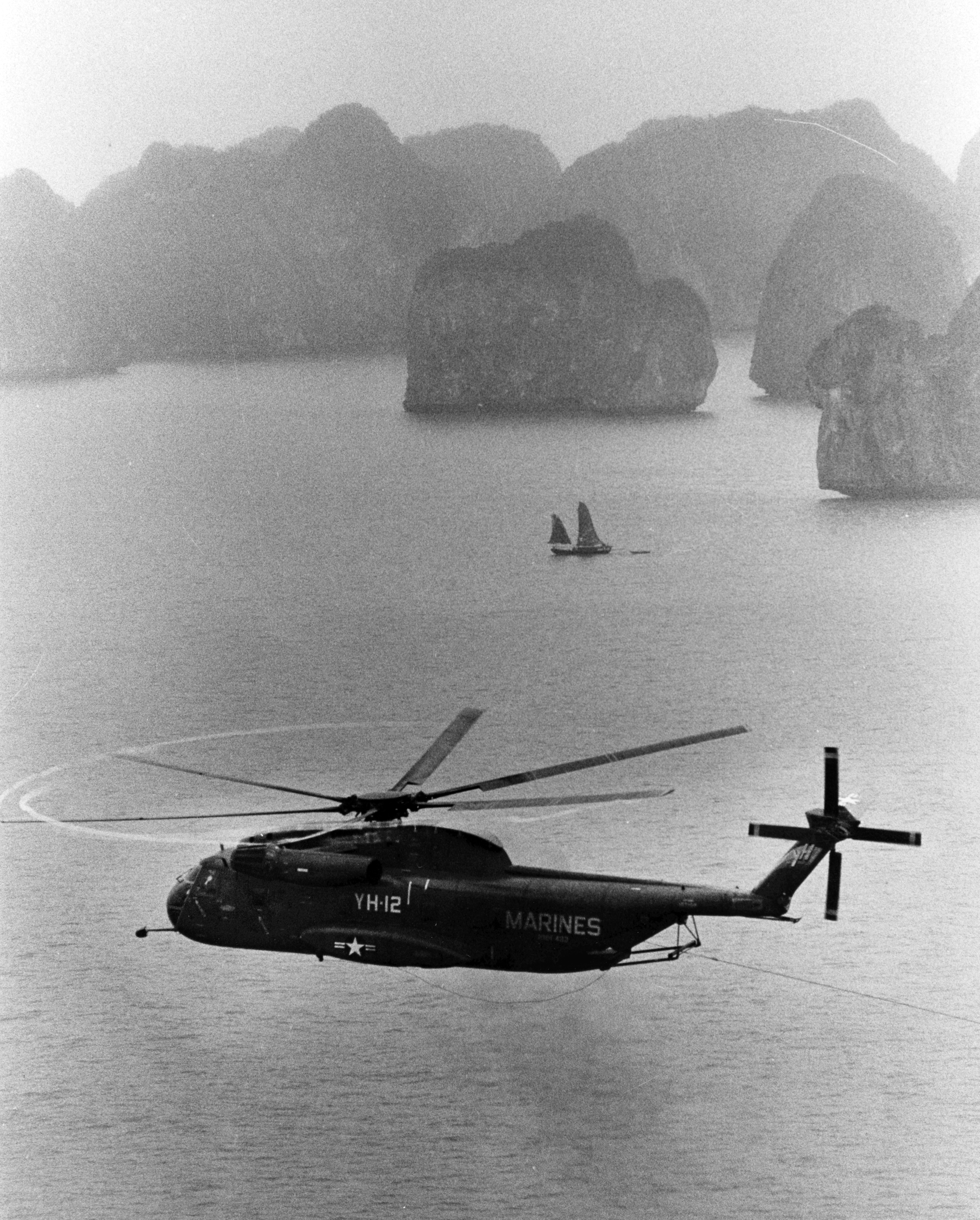
A United States Marine Corps CH-53A Sea Stallion helicopter off North Vietnam on a minesweeping flight in 1973.

Minesweeping began on 6 February 1973, when the ocean minesweepers USS Engage (MSO-433), USS Force (MSO-445), USS Fortify (MSO-446), and USS Impervious (MSO-449) swept coastal waters near Haiphong, protected by the guided-missile frigate USS Worden (DLG-18) and destroyer USS Epperson (DD-719). On 27 February 1973, the amphibious assault ships USS Tripoli (LPH-10), USS New Orleans (LPH-11), and USS Inchon (LPH-12) and the amphibious transport docks USS Dubuque (LPD-8), USS Vancouver (LPD-2), USS Ogden (LPD-5), and USS Cleveland (LPD-7) joined the task force, carrying the 31 CH-53 Sea Stallion helicopters of HM-12, HMM-165, and HMH-463. The helicopters swept the main shipping channel to Haiphong the same day. The next day, however, President Nixon ordered a suspension of End Sweep in response to North Vietnamese delays in releasing prisoners-of-war.

End Sweep resumed on 6 March. On 9 March, a mine exploded – the only one to explode during End Sweep – as a minesweeping helicopter passed it and the explosion was captured on film by the helicopter's Swept Mine Locator. On 17 March, Task Force 78 helicopters swept the ports of Hon Gai and Cam Pha. Elsewhere in North Vietnam, U.S. Navy technical personnel prepared 50 North Vietnamese sailors to conduct their own minesweeping operations and American C-130 Hercules transport aircraft and helicopters from HMM-165 delivered minesweeping gear to the North Vietnamese at Cat Bi Airfield outside Haiphong.

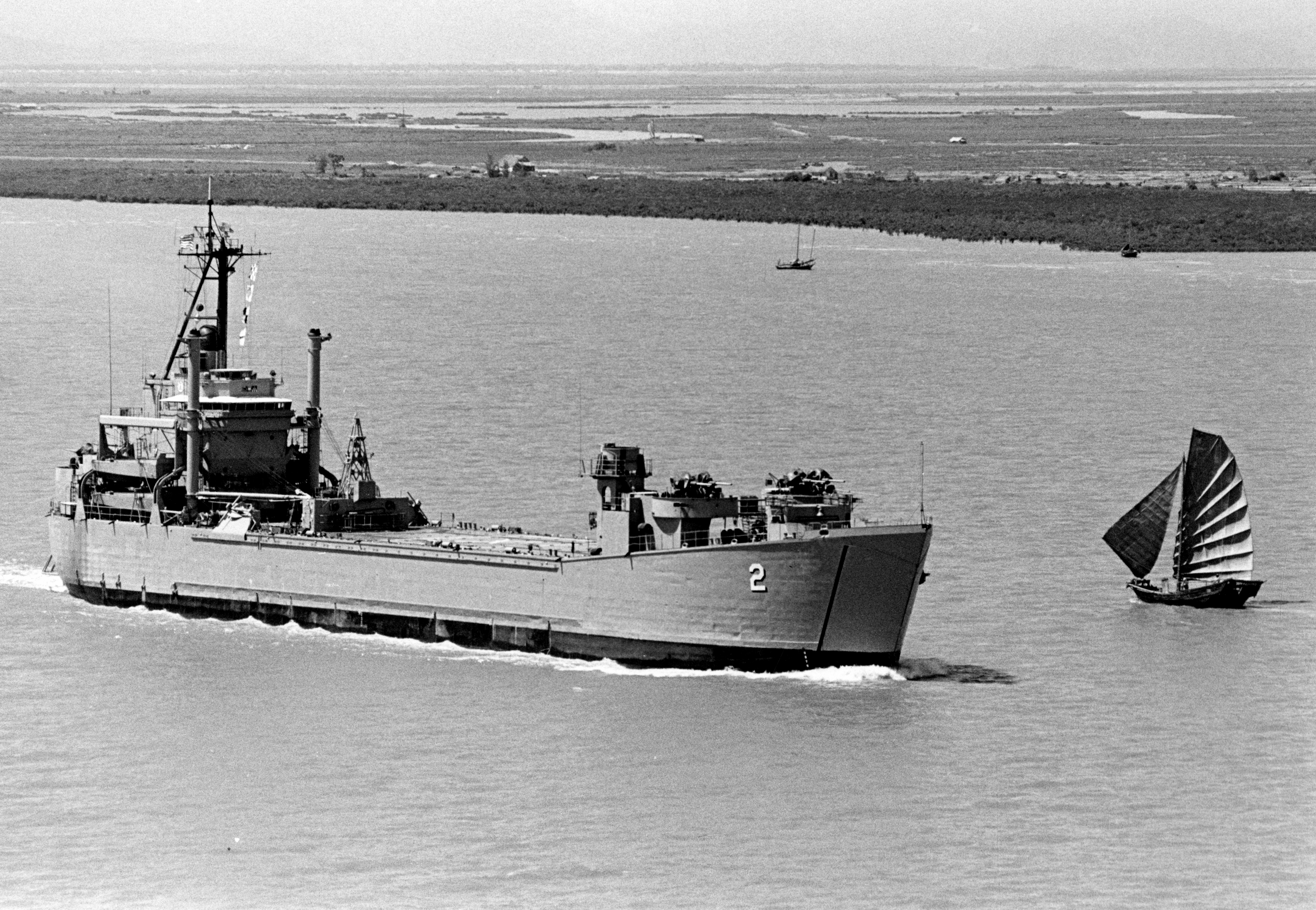
The special device minesweeper USS Washtenaw County (MSS-2) making her final check sweep in Haiphong Harbor on 20 June 1973. A single-masted junk under sail is at right.

Washtenaw County arrived at Haiphong from the Philippines on 6 April, and made her first six check runs there on 14 April, the first American ship to enter Haiphong harbor in over a decade. She had made only two out of a planned six runs the following day when further runs were suspended because the United States believed that the North Vietnamese government was not fulfilling its obligations under the Paris Peace Accords. Washington ordered a suspension of all minesweeping operations and, on 17 April, Task Force 78 returned to Subic Bay for upkeep.

On 13 June, the United States and North Vietnam signed a joint communiqué in Paris which, among other things, required that the United States resume minesweeping no later than 20 June and complete all minesweeping no later than 13 July. With all mines by now past their latest possible sterilization date, End Sweep resumed on 18 June. On 20 June, Task Force 78 completed its check sweeps of Haiphong, and soon had also cleared Hon Gai and Cam Pha. Next, the task force concentrated on the coastal areas off Vinh. The final minesweeping operations took place on 5 July, and the next day Rear Admiral McCauley informed the North Vietnamese that the United States had concluded its mine countermeasures operations in North Vietnamese waters.

Operation End Sweep ended officially on 27 July 1973, and Task Force 78 withdrew from North Vietnamese waters the following day.

== Results ==
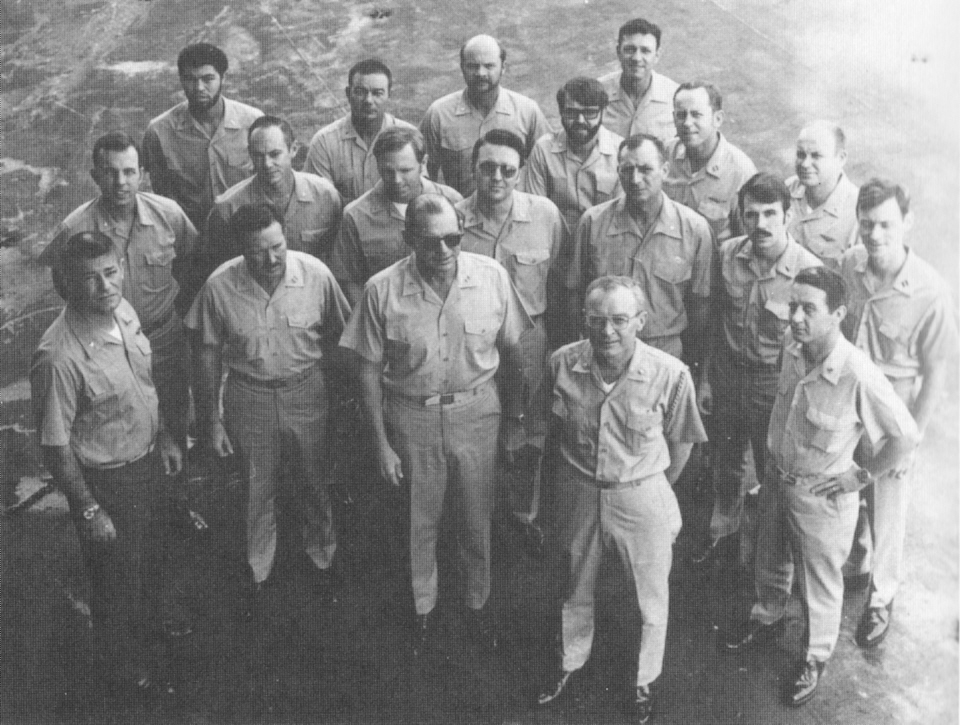
The Commander of Task Force 78 (Mine Countermeasures Force), U.S. Seventh Fleet, Rear Admiral Brian McCauley (front row, center), with his staff and other members of the task force.

In addition to Engage, Force, Fortify, and Impervious, the ocean minesweepers USS Enhance (MSO-437), USS Illusive (MSO-448), USS Inflict (MSO-456), USS Leader (MSO-490), USS Conquest (MSO-488), and USS Esteem (MSO-438) took part in some part of End Sweep; six of the ten ocean minesweepers conducted actual sweeping operations, as did Washtenaw County in her special role. Nine amphibious warfare ships, six fleet tugs, three salvage ships, and 19 destroyer-type ships also operated in Task Force 78 during at least a portion of the six months of End Sweep.

Two helicopters were lost, and Enhance suffered fire damage during the operation. The overall cost of the operation, including repairs to Enhance, was $20,394,000 more than the cost expected for normal operations of the units involved. The six ocean minesweepers that had conducted actual minesweeping operations spent 439 hours involved in them.

== Assessment ==
Although End Sweep was a great success in the eyes of the American leadership and general public, U.S. Navy mine warfare analysts were less sanguine about what the operation had demonstrated. It was unusual in the U.S. Navy for a minesweeping operation to enjoy the political visibility and priority that End Sweep did, allowing the operation to make use of an amount and quality of U.S. Navy and Marine Corps staff, operational, and scientific resources not generally available to minesweeping, and analysts cautioned that such circumstances could not be counted on in future mine clearance campaigns. Moreover, the operation had been made relatively easy by the U.S. Navy's knowledge of the types and locations of the mines that had been laid, the selection of only magnetic mines during the minelaying campaign, and the planned self-sterilization of so many mines before sweeping began.

The American public and many U.S. Navy personnel came away from End Sweep with the impression that helicopters had replaced surface ships in the minesweeping role due to their effectiveness and far greater mobility. Here, too, Navy mine warfare analysts differed with the popular impression. While helicopters swept three to six times faster than surface minesweepers, they also proved to be very demanding in terms of logistical support and manpower, and often were down for repair due to the high stress of minesweeping on the helicopters. Navy mine warfare analysts concluded that a balanced force of surface minesweepers and helicopters supported by a significant number of support ships would be required in future mine clearance operations.
