= Steem =

Steem may refer to:

- Steem (peanut butter)
- Steem, the cryptocurrency of Steemit

== See also ==
- Esteem
