= Self esteem (disambiguation) =

Self esteem is a human emotional need.

It may also refer to:

- "Self Esteem" (song), by The Offspring
- Self Esteem (musician), born Rebecca Lucy Taylor

== See also ==
- Esteem (disambiguation)
