= Esteem =

Esteem may refer to:

- Esteem (album), by Machinations, 1983
- ESTEEM Program, at University of Notre Dame
- ESteem, modeling company which partnered with SM Entertainment to form ESteem Entertainment
- ESteem Entertainment, SM Entertainment partnered with modeling company ESteem
- Optare Esteem, a British bus
- Suzuki Esteem, a compact car
- USS Esteem (AM-438), a minesweeper
- Respect, also called esteem

== See also ==
- Self-esteem
- Esteem needs
