= USS Enhance (AM-437) =

Minesweeper of the United States Navy

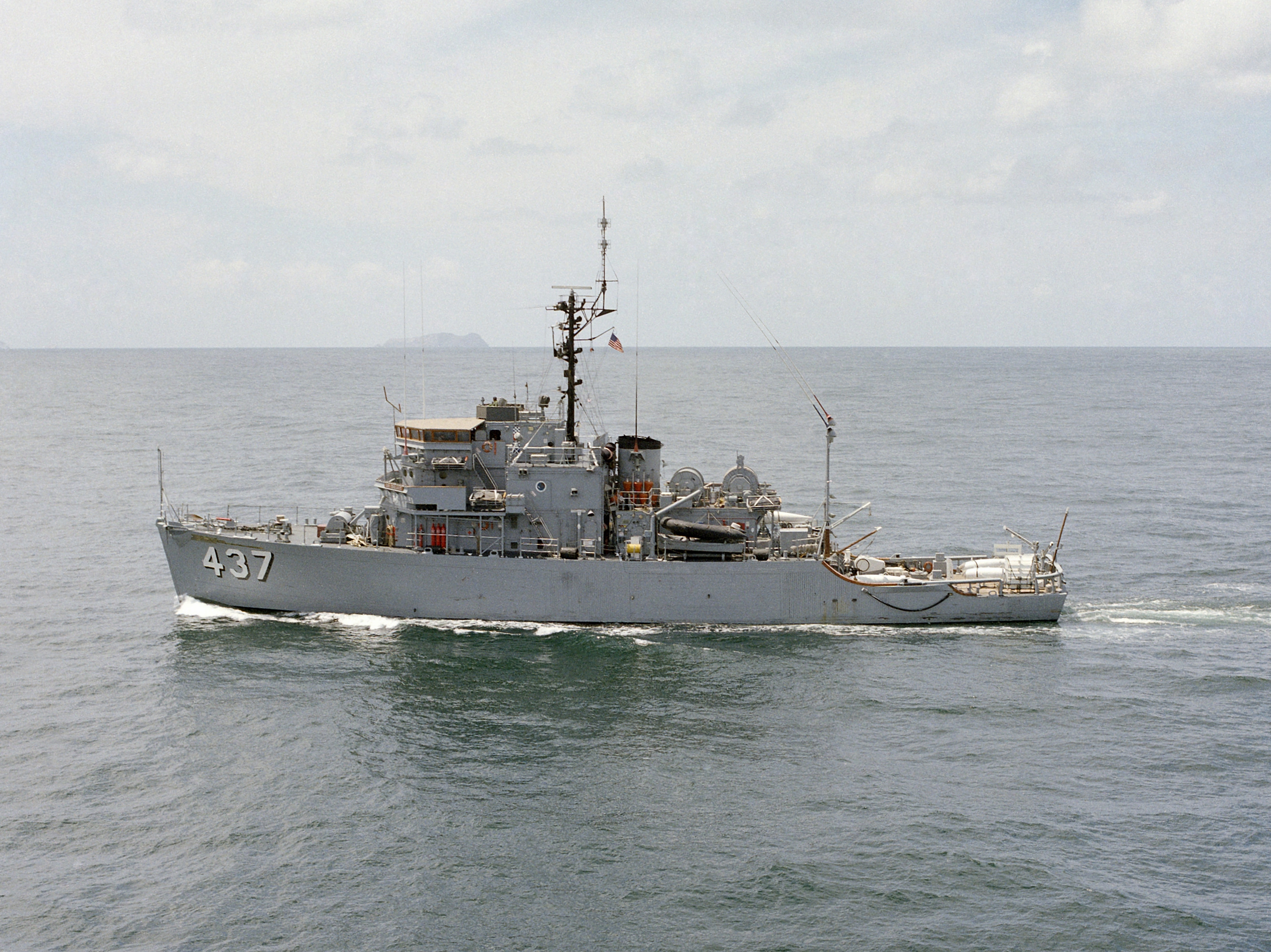
- USS Enhance, 6 May 1977

History

United States
- Builder: Martinolich Shipbuilding Co., San Diego, California
- Laid down: 12 July 1952
- Launched: 11 October 1952
- Commissioned: 16 April 1955
- Decommissioned: 31 December 1991
- Reclassified: MSO-437, 7 February 1955
- Stricken: 21 February 1992
- Home port: Long Beach, California
- Fate: Sold for scrapping, 6 March 2000

General characteristics
- Class & type: Aggressive-class minesweeper
- Displacement: 620 tons
- Length: 172 ft (52 m)
- Beam: 36 ft (11 m)
- Draught: 10 ft (3.0 m)
- Propulsion: Four Packard ID1700 diesel engines, two shafts, two controllable pitch propellers
- Speed: 16 knots
- Complement: 74
- Armament: one 40 mm mount

USS Enhance (AM-437/MSO-437) was an Aggressive-class minesweeper acquired by the U.S. Navy for the task of removing mines that had been placed in the water to prevent the safe passage of ships.

Enhance was launched 11 October 1952 by Martinolich Shipbuilding Co., San Diego, California; sponsored by Mrs. A. C. Martinolich; reclassified MSO-437, 7 February 1955; and commissioned 16 April 1955.

== West Coast operations ==
From her home port, Long Beach, California, Enhance operated along the U.S. West Coast on training and exercises in mine warfare. She sailed from Long Beach 1 October 1956 for her first tour of duty with the U.S. 7th Fleet in the Far East. During that fall's crisis over the Suez Canal, Enhance patrolled in the Sea of Japan, recording the movement of shipping, as part of the intensified alertness required of the Navy during periods of international tension anywhere in the world. She returned to Long Beach 12 April 1957 and resumed her west coast operations.

During her second Far Eastern deployment, from 2 April 1959 to 16 October, Enhance joined in exercises with minecraft of the navies of the Republic of China and the Republic of Korea. Returning to west coast operations, on 8 January 1960 she rescued four men from an overturned sailboat off Long Beach. In June 1960 she visited Portland, Oregon. Enhance spent the remainder of the year conducting type training and undergoing overhaul at San Diego.

Left Long Beach, California in 1971 after an overhaul for operations in Vietnam in December 1972. Swept mine fields of Vietnam to clear Harbors.

On 17 March 1973, during Operation End Sweep, Enhance had an engine room fire which seriously damaged the ship. Enhance was towed to Subic bay. Repair cost was $294,000. Enhance was also disabled by an engine room fire on 5 January 1975 off San Diego.

Enhance was decommissioned in 1991 and struck from the Navy list in 1992. She was sold for scrapping in 2000.
