= Lynch Shipbuilding =

Shipyard in San Diego, California, United States

Coordinates: 32.690416°N 117.139191°W

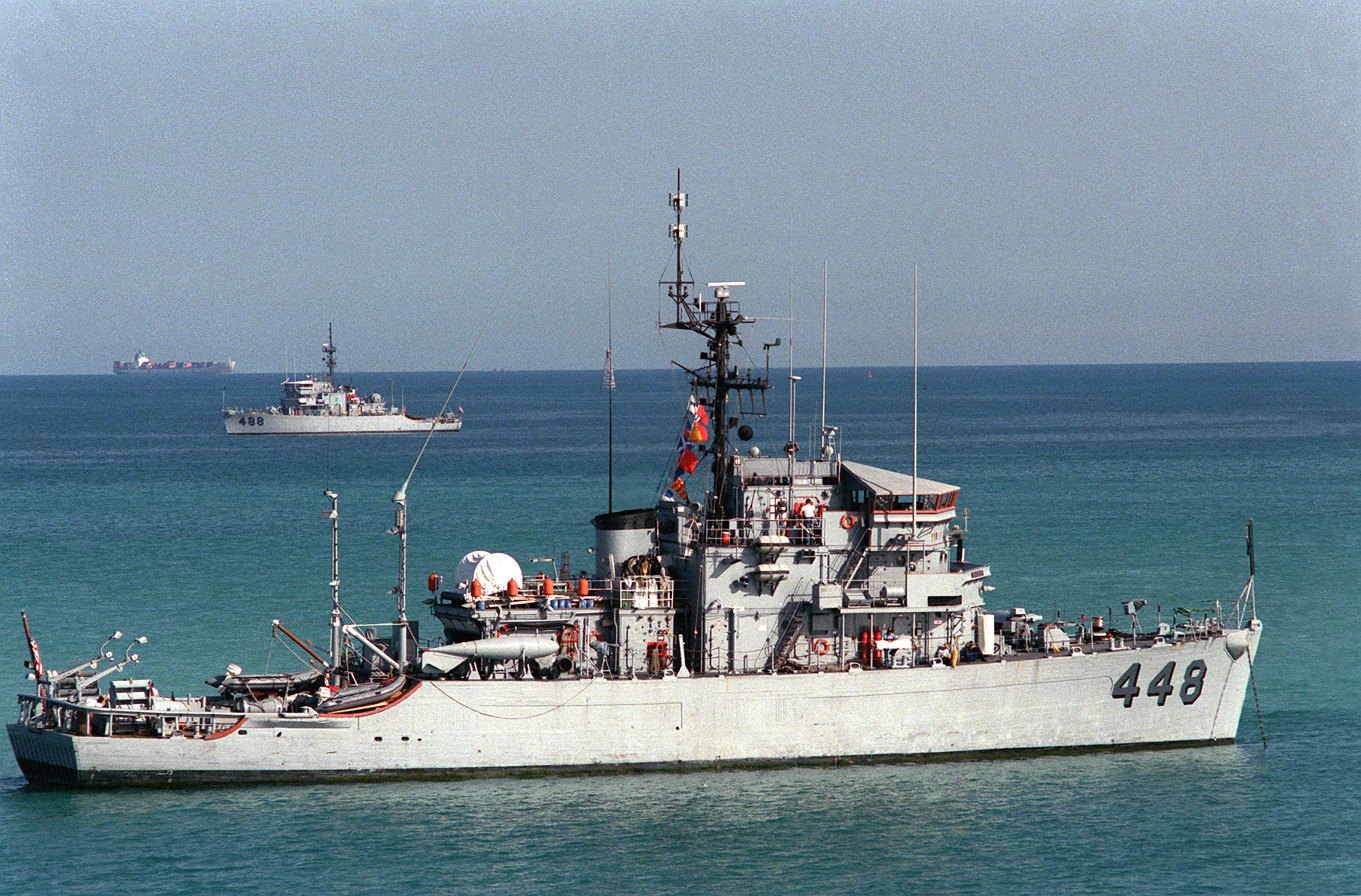
USS Illusive (MSO-448) and USS Conquest (MSO-488) off Sitra, Bahrain, on 26 December 1987

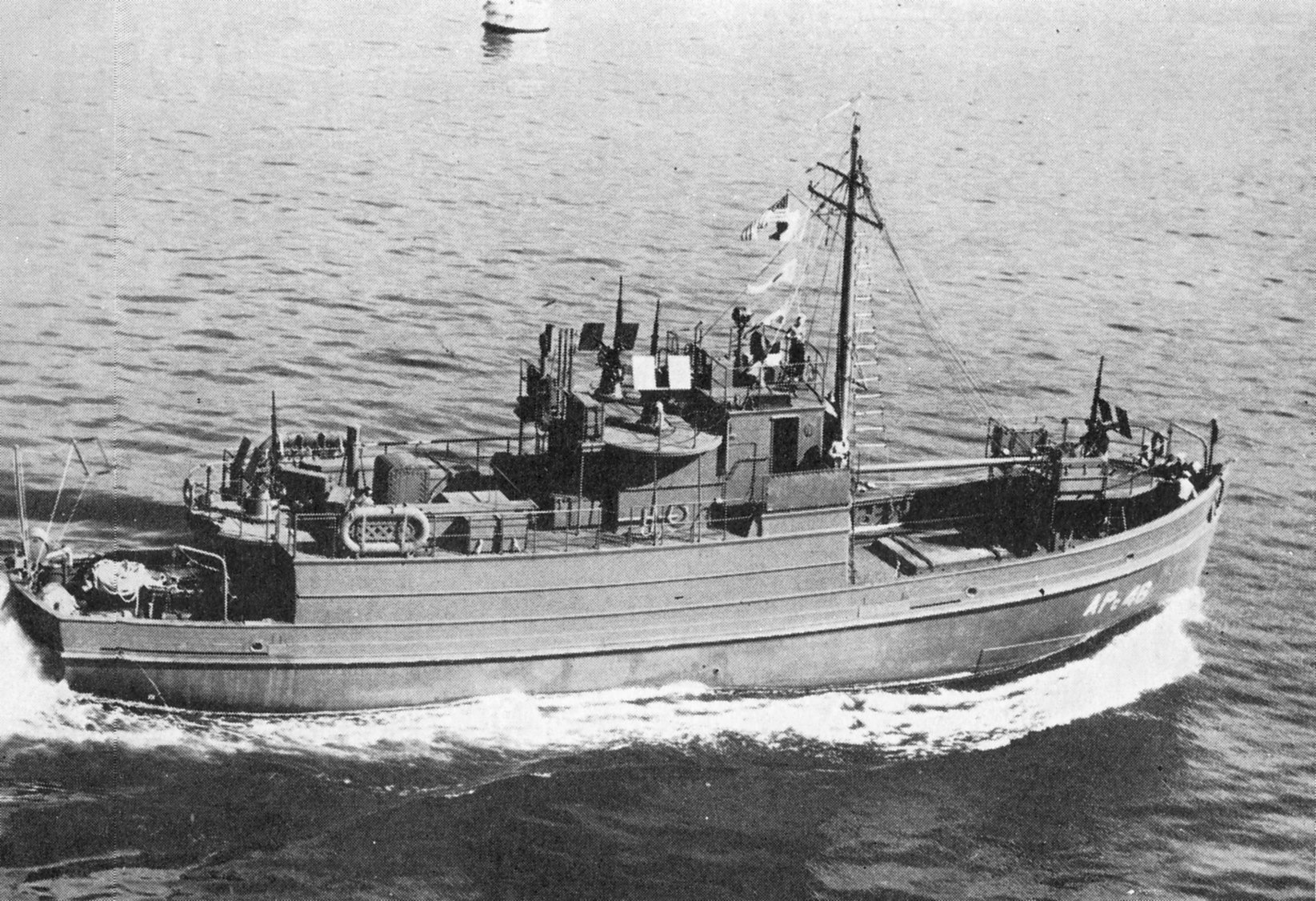
US Navy USS APc-46 / AMc-188

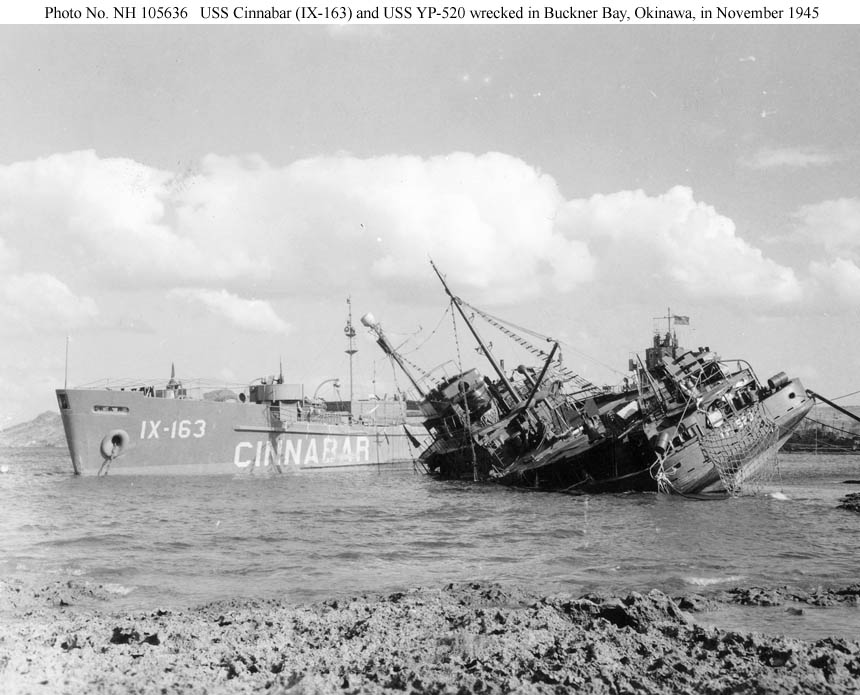
The remains of USS YP-520, are in the foreground, her wooden bow totally sheared off just forward of the foremast, from Typhoon Louise on 9 October 1945 at Buckner Bay, Okinawa. Background Cinnabar (IX-163). Photo from November 1945

Lynch Shipbuilding was a wooden shipbuilding company in San Diego, California. To support the World War II demand for ships, Lynch Shipbuilding built US Navy rescue tugs and coastal cargo ships. Lynch Shipbuilding yard was started in the 1930s. Lynch was in the lumber business at the time also. In 1952 the yard was sold to Martinolich Shipbuilding Company, as Martinolich Shipbuilding San Diego. Martinolich's main shipyard was in Dockton, Washington. John A. Martinolich died in 1960. Martinolich's sons operated boatyards from 1940s to 1970 in Tacoma and San Diego also. Martinolich sold the San Diego shipyard in 1957 to National Steel and Shipbuilding Company which is at the current site, 1400 South 28th Street, San Diego.

== Notable ships ==
- Six APc-1-class small coastal transports. Displacement of 100 tons lite, 258 tons full, a length 103 feet, a beam of 21 feet, a draft of 9 feet, a top speed of 10 knots. Crew of 3 officers and 22 enlisted with a troop transport of 66 troops. Armed four Oerlikon 20 mm cannons. Power one 400shp Atlas 6HM2124 Diesel engine, to a Snow and Knobstedt single reduction gear, to a single propeller with 400shp
- Seven ATR-1-class rescue tug with wood hull. Displacement of 852 tons lite, 1,315 tons full, a length of 165 feet, a beam of 33 feet, a draft of 16 feet, top speed of 12.2kts. Armed with one 3-inch/50-caliber gun, two Oerlikon 20 mm cannons. A crew of 5 officers and 47 enlisted. Power one Prescott Co. vertical triple-expansion reciprocating steam engine, with two Foster Wheeler "D"-type boilers 200psi to a single propeller with 1,600shp.
- Six 1950s US Navy Aggressive-class minesweepers: USS Enhance (AM-437), USS Illusive (AM-448), USS Impervious (AM-449), and USS Esteem (AM-438).

=== Lynch Shipbuilding ===
Ship ID	Original Name	Original Owner	Type	Tons	Delivered	Notes
	Conte Grande		Tuna Seiner	296	1942	To USN 1942 as YP 520, scrapped 1947
258868	AMc 187/APc 45	US Navy	Coastal Transport	100d	27-Apr-43	Sold in 1949 as Halawai, renamed Tonquin
	AMc 188/APc 46	US Navy	Coastal Transport	100d	11-Feb-43	To USN 1942 as YP 521, sold in 1951 rename Retriever, renamed Pelican, lost in 1969
	AMc 189/APc 47	US Navy	Coastal Transport	100d	9-Jun-43	
255400	AMc 190/APc 48	US Navy	Coastal Transport	100d	30-Apr-43	Sold in 1946 as Allen Cody, now a yacht
	AMc 191/APc 49	US Navy	Coastal Transport	100d	27-Apr-43	
	AMc 192/APc 50	US Navy	Coastal Transport	100d	9-Jun-43	
	YNG 37	US Navy	Gate Tender		1943	Sold in 1947
	ATR 35	US Navy	Rescue Tug	850d	5-May-44	Disposed of in 1946
	ATR 36	US Navy	Rescue Tug	850d	27-Jul-44	Disposed of in 1946
	ATR 37	US Navy	Rescue Tug	850d	30-Sep-44	Sold in 1946 renamed Beaver
	ATR 38	US Navy	Rescue Tug	850d	15-Nov-44	Disposed of in 1946
	ATR 39	US Navy	Rescue Tug	850d	10-Jan-45	Disposed of in 1946
	ATR 40	US Navy	Rescue Tug	850d	39-Apr-45	Disposed of in 1946
1047746	Ghost	Seawind Fisheries	Fishing Vessel	572	1944	Now Sea Bird
249363	West Coast	Anthony Mascarenhas	Cargo Vessel	199	1946	
250929	Heroic	Manuel O. Medina	Fishing Vessel	274	1946	
251190	Katie Lou	Felix Budzilko	Fishing Vessel	296	1946	

=== Martinolich Shipbuilding San Diego ===
Original Name	Original Owner	Type	Tons	Delivered	Notes
USS Illusive (AM-448)	U.S. Navy	Minesweeper	780d	14-Nov-53	Scrapped in 1993
USS Impervious (AM-449)	U.S. Navy	Minesweeper	780d	15-Jul-54	Scrapped in 2002
USS Enhance (AM-437)	U.S. Navy	Minesweeper	780d	16-Apr-55	Scrapped in 2000
USS Esteem (AM-438)	U.S. Navy	Minesweeper	780d	10-Sep-55	Scrapped in 2000
Storione (MSO 506)	U.S. Navy	Minesweeper	780d	1-Feb-56	To Italy renamed M 5434, active
Salmone (MSO 507)	U.S. Navy	Minesweeper	780d	1-Jun-56	To Italy renamed M 5430, struck in 1996

== See also ==
- California during World War II
- Maritime history of California
- Wooden boats of World War 2
