= USS New Orleans (LPH-11) =

Cold War-era ambhibious assault ship of the US Navy

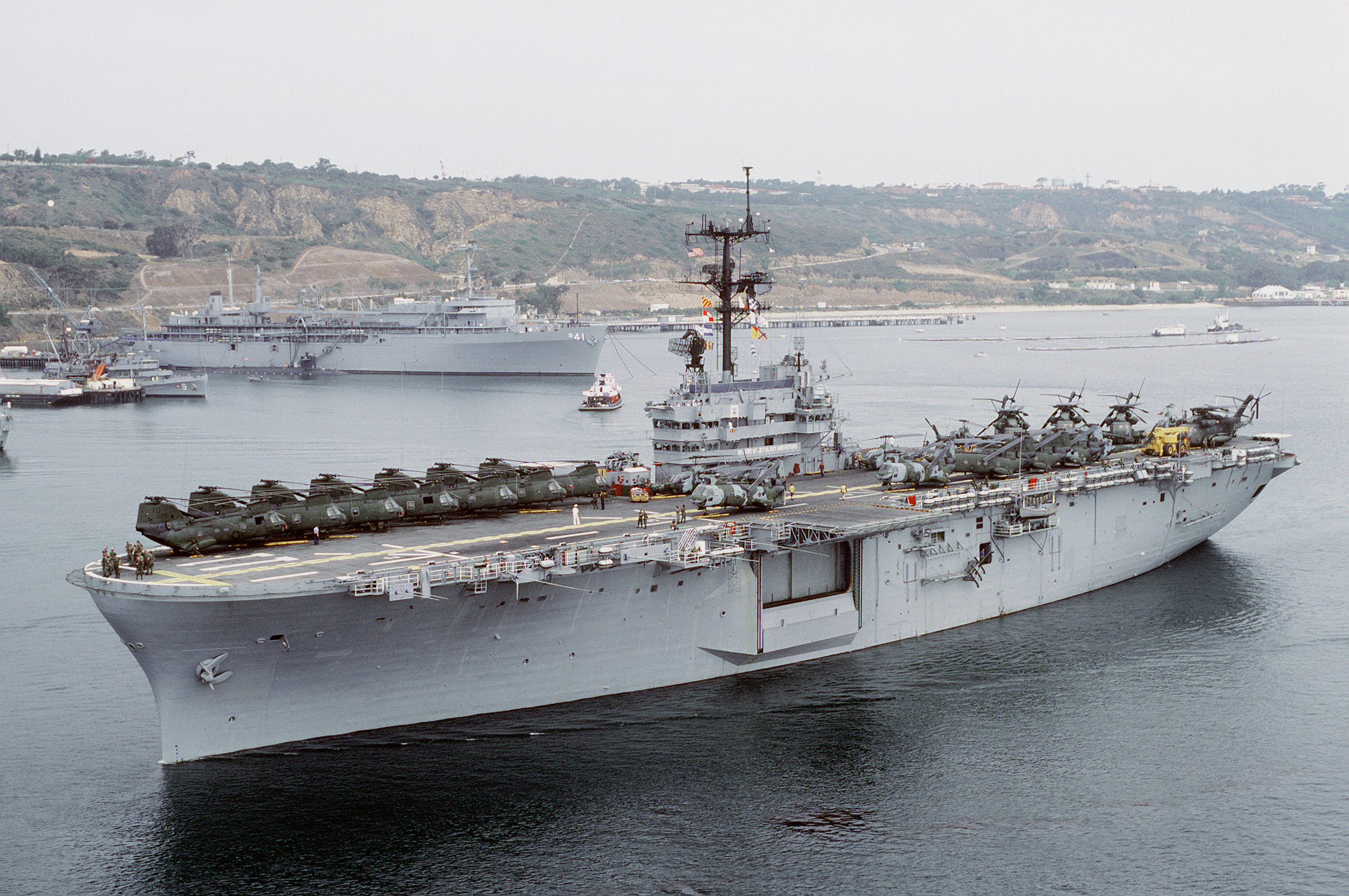
- USS New Orleans in 1988

History

United States
- Name: New Orleans
- Namesake: Battle of New Orleans
- Ordered: 18 December 1964
- Builder: Philadelphia Naval Shipyard
- Laid down: 1 March 1966
- Launched: 3 February 1968
- Commissioned: 16 November 1968
- Decommissioned: 31 October 1997
- Stricken: 23 October 1998
- Identification: Callsign: NAON; Hull number: LPH-11
- Motto: The Enforcers
- Fate: Sunk as target, 10 July 2010

General characteristics
- Class & type: Iwo Jima-class amphibious assault ship
- Displacement: 19,431 tons
- Length: 598 ft (182 m)
- Beam: 84 ft (26 m)
- Draught: 30 ft (9.1 m)
- Propulsion: 2 × 600 psi (4.1 MPa) boilers, one geared steam turbines, one shaft, 22,000 shaft horse power
- Speed: 23 knots (26 mph; 43 km/h)
- Complement: 718 (80 officer, 638 enlisted)
- Armament: 2 × 2 3-inch (76 mm) / 50 caliber DP guns, 2 × Mk-25 Sea Sparrow Missile Launchers, (added later); 2 × 20 mm Phalanx CIWS
- Aircraft carried: 20 × CH-46 Sea Knights, 10 × MH-53E Sea Stallion, 3 × AH-1 Cobra

USS New Orleans (LPH-11) was an Iwo Jima-class amphibious assault ship in the United States Navy. She was the third Navy ship to be so named, and is the first named for the Battle of New Orleans, which was the last major battle of the War of 1812.

New Orleans was laid down on 1 March 1966 at the Philadelphia Naval Shipyard in Philadelphia, Pennsylvania. She was launched on 3 February 1968 and sponsored by Mrs. Arthur A. De la Houssaye. She was commissioned on 16 November 1968.

== 1960s and 1970s ==
New Orleans made her first appearance in the Western Pacific in August 1969 as flagship for Amphibious Ready Group Bravo. Her embarked Marine helicopter squadron and battalion landing team were ready to be landed within hours. In October, she hosted the Eighth Vietnamese Awards. Later that month, she participated in Operation Keystone Cardinal, a retrograde movement of Marines out of South Vietnam. The ship's first deployment terminated in March 1970. After having participated in five amphibious exercises, conducted many weeks of Amphibious Ready Group (ARG) maneuvers in the South China Sea, and visiting such ports as Hong Kong, Manila, Subic Bay, Okinawa, and Taipei, New Orleans returned to San Diego.

Two other interesting assignments were given to New Orleans prior to her next Western Pacific deployment. In August 1970, she became flagship for Commander First Fleet and provided support for president Richard Nixon's visit to Puerto Vallarta, Mexico, and made a port call to Acapulco. Then, in late 1970, she prepared for the recovery of Apollo 14. On 9 February 1971, she picked up astronauts Alan Shepard, Stuart Roosa, and Edgar Mitchell some 900 miles (1,450 km) south of American Samoa.

In May 1971, New Orleans made her second Western Pacific appearance, conducting various contingency exercises, a multi-national cruising exercise simulating a convoy under combat conditions, and a simulated assault with the Marines on the island of Mindoro, Republic of the Philippines. This deployment was completed in November of that same year.

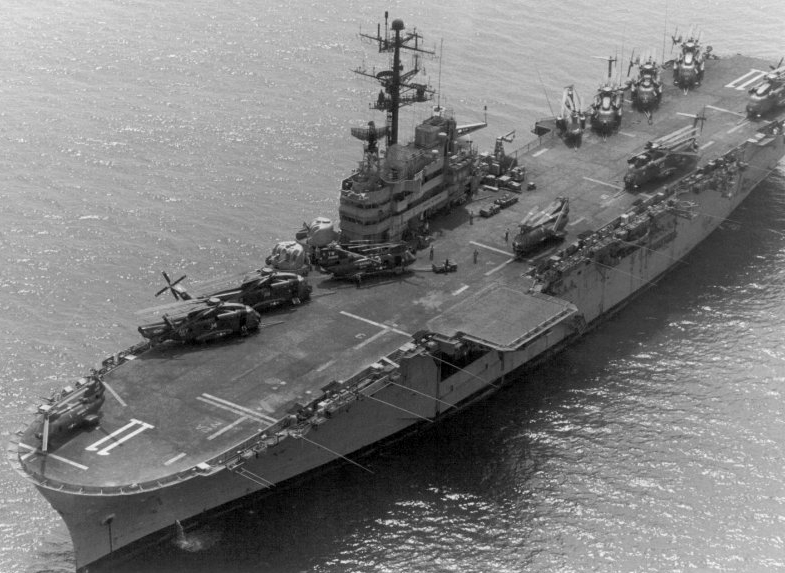
New Orleans during Operation End Sweep off Hai Phong Port, 1973.

Following a rather extensive yard period, New Orleans began her next Western Pacific deployment on 17 July 1972. She became flagship for Amphibious Squadron Three and later Amphibious Ready Group Alfa. During late July and early August, New Orleans and her embarked units participated in the Philippine flood relief operations, earning the Philippine Presidential Unit Citation.

The helicopter carrier became engaged in contingency operations again with the ready group off the coast of Vietnam until early February 1973, at which time she became the flagship for Commander Task Force 78 and the control ship for Operation End Sweep. CTF 78, headed by Rear Admiral Brian McCauley, was tasked with de-mining operations for the coast and harbors of North Vietnam. She ceased operations in Haiphong Harbor on 17 April 1973.

New Orleans next participated in recovery operations for the final two crewed Skylab missions: Skylab 3 on 25 September 1973, and the Skylab 4 mission on 8 February 1974. She was also present for the recovery of astronauts Thomas Stafford, Deke Slayton, and Vance Brand during the joint American–Soviet Apollo–Soyuz mission of 24 July 1975. That was the last splashdown of an American crewed spacecraft in the 20th century as NASA would go on to use the Space Shuttle, which landed like an airplane on land-based runways.

== 1980s ==
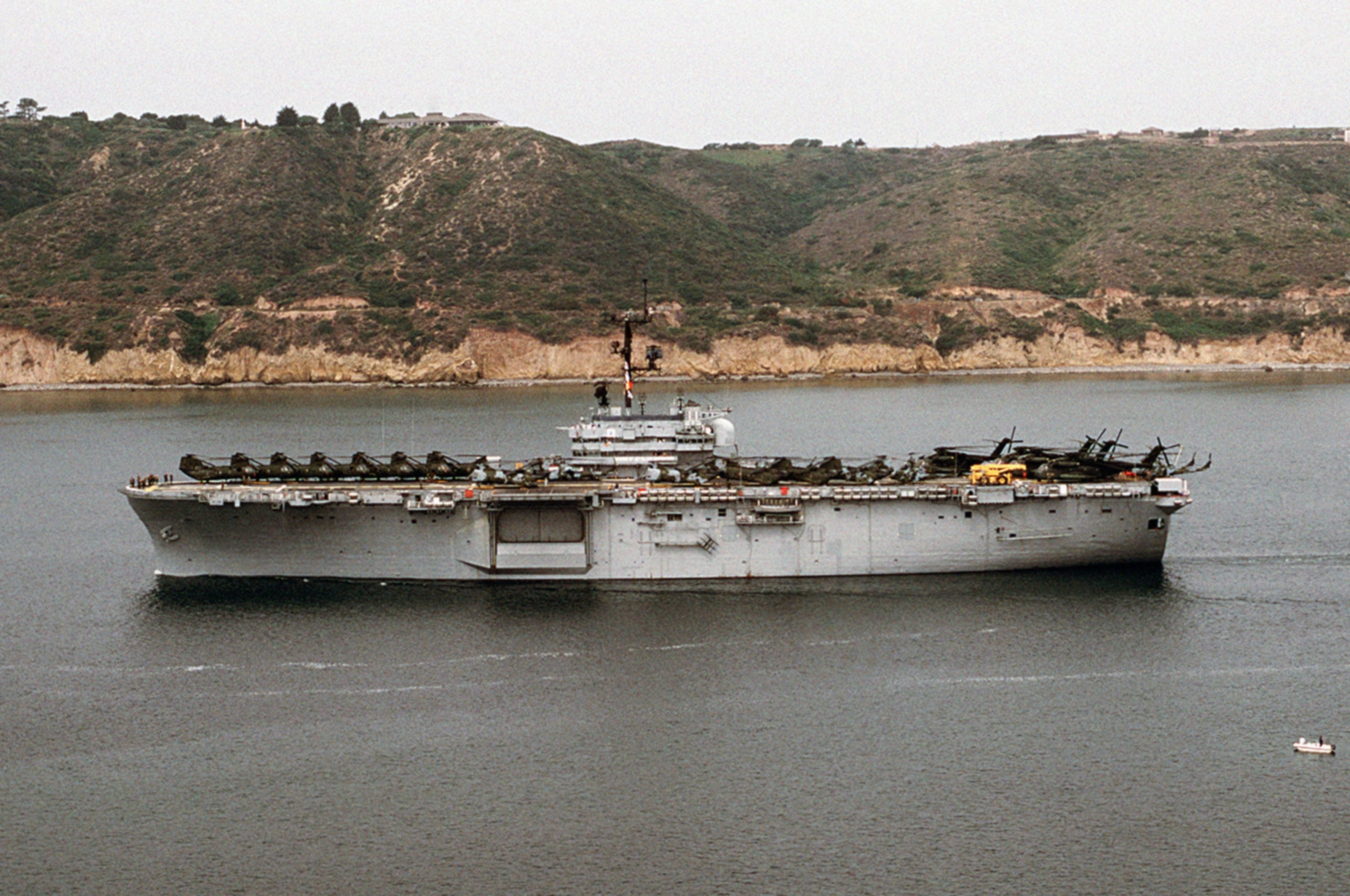
USS New Orleans underway with a complement of CH-53 Sea Stallion and CH-46 Sea Knight helicopters lining the flight deck.

In 1980, the ship deployed and spent several months in the Indian Ocean during the Iran hostage crisis. She completed a major overhaul at Puget Sound Naval Shipyard in 1981. Deployments and exercises in 1982 and 1983 included RIMPAC '82, Exercise Kernel Usher '83-1, Operation Team Spirit 83, and WESTPAC '83. From May to December 1984, New Orleans sailed the Indian Ocean and Western Pacific, participating in eight major amphibious operations. These included Operation Beach Guard, Operation Cobra Gold & Operation Valiant Usher and was honored as the first US ship to land troops ashore at the island of Iwo Jima since WWII as well as troops at Inchon, Korea since the Korean War. While on WESTPAC in 1986, she served in an alert status off the Philippine coast during that country's national elections. She also served as the medical and communications support ship for president Ronald Reagan's trip to Bali, Indonesia.

Upon her return to home port, New Orleans participated in two major exercises leading to her thirteenth deployment to the Western Pacific. During this time, she participated in four amphibious exercises, including Cobra Gold '88, Valiant Usher '89-1, and Valiant Blitz '89-1. The ship called on the port of Perth, Australia, during that country's bicentennial. In 1989, she made port visits to Mazatlán (Mexico) and Seattle, Washington, for the Seattle Sea Fair. She also conducted a humanitarian relief effort in Cabo San Lucas (Mexico).

== 1990s ==
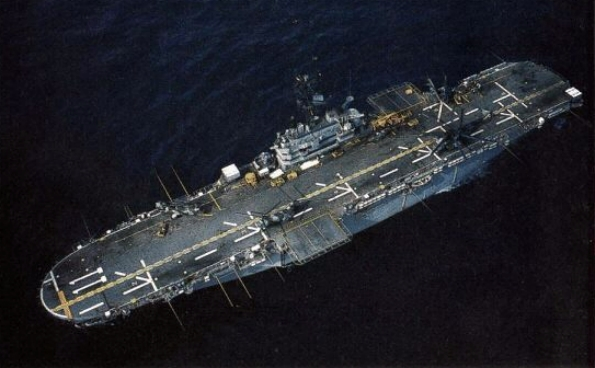
USS New Orleans flight deck.

Following completion of a phased maintenance availability in January 1990, New Orleans sailed the Western Pacific, Indian Ocean, and Persian Gulf in support of Operations Desert Storm, Desert Saber and Desert Shield from 1 December 1990 to 28 August 1991. She served as a member of CTG-36/CTF-156, the largest amphibious task force to deploy from the West Coast of the United States in 25 years. Significant accomplishments included the off-load of 1,700 Marine combat troops on G-Day and aviation mine countermeasures in the North Persian Gulf, ten nautical miles (19 km) off the coast of Kuwait.

In November 1991, New Orleans returned to San Diego for a six-month overhaul. In October 1992, she hosted festivities at Fleet Week '92 in San Francisco. After returning to San Diego, she was the first LPH to go through Afloat Training Group Pacific's "Tailored Ship's Training Availability" and was instrumental in developing a training track for LPH-class ships. In September 1993, New Orleans deployed on her fifteenth WESTPAC cruise where she participated in Exercise Valiant Usher '93 and was a member of the Amphibious Ready Group that conducted operations in support of Operation Restore Hope at Mogadishu, Somalia. New Orleans became part of Naval Battle Force, Somalia, under Rear Admiral Arthur K. Cebrowski, in October–November 1993. Other elements of the force included USS America, USS Simpson, USS Cayuga (LST-1186), USS Denver (LPD 9), USS Comstock (LSD 45), and the 13th Marine Expeditionary Unit. New Orleans received the Armed Forces Expeditionary Medal and a Meritorious Unit Commendation for Somalia related operations from 18 October 1993 to 1 February 1994.[3]

New Orleans next sailed onto the movie screen in November 1994 when astronaut Captain Jim Lovell, USN, director Ron Howard, and actors Tom Hanks, Kevin Bacon, and Bill Paxton came aboard to film several portions of the Oscar-winning film Apollo 13. She portrayed the then-decommissioned USS Iwo Jima, one of her sister ships.

June 1995 saw New Orleans underway again for WESTPAC operations. She was present to support the Marine raid on the Al Hamra Facility on 24 October of that year. She returned to San Diego on 22 December 1995, after embarking 198 Sea Scouts as part of a "Tiger Cruise" during the last leg of her journey from Pearl Harbor to San Diego. The ship got underway again on 31 January 1997, for another WESTPAC cruise which included boarding the Marines from the 31st MEU(SOC) based out of Okinawa, Japan and participating in Operation Tandem Thrust '97 in Townsville, Australia in which it weathered Cyclone Justin before returning to port on 2 May.

== Fate ==
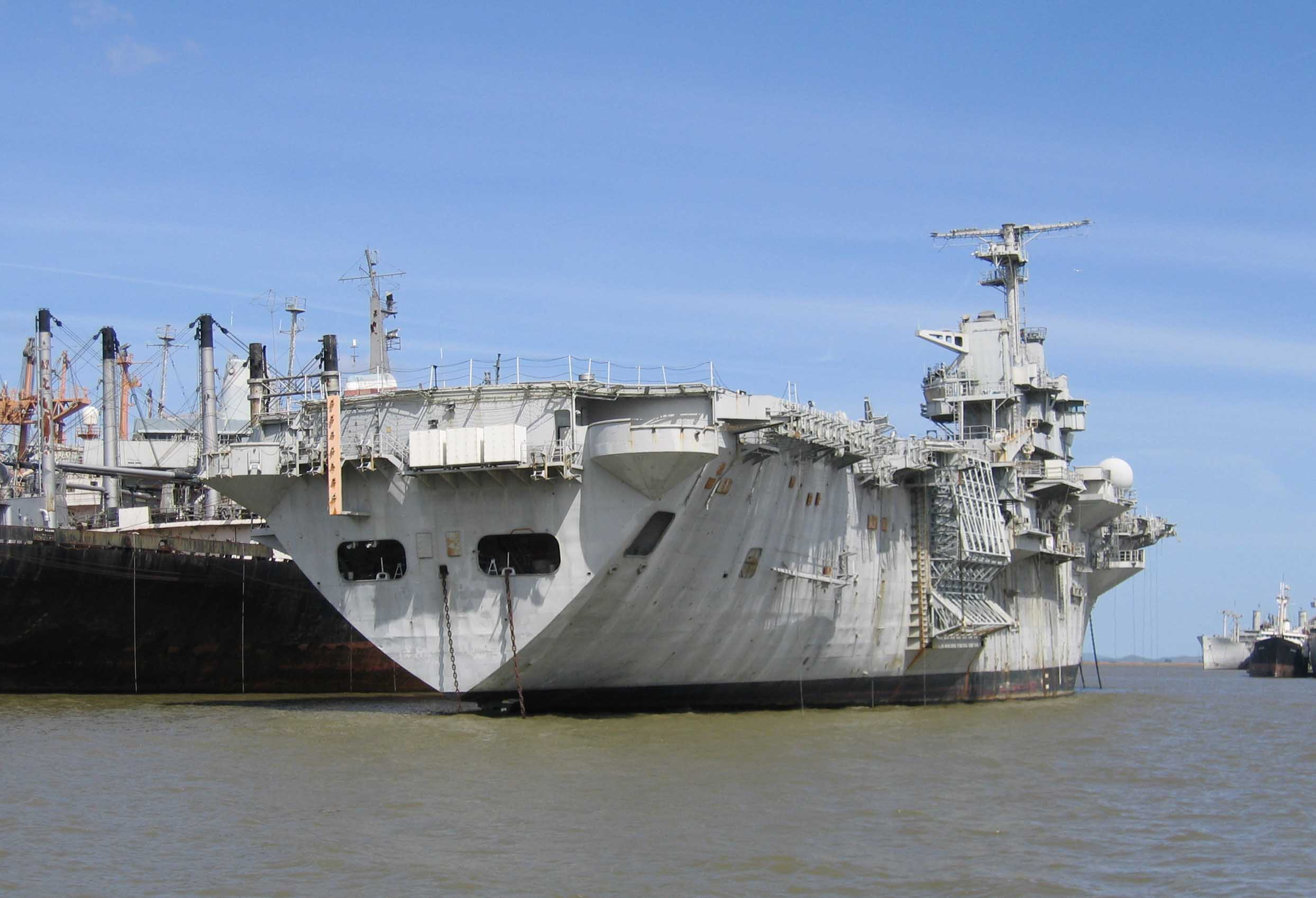
New Orleans, laid up in the Suisun Bay Reserve Fleet

New Orleans was decommissioned and placed in reserve in San Diego, California, in October 1997. She was the recipient of the Navy Unit Commendation, four Battle Efficiency Awards, the Meritorious Unit Commendation, the Navy Expeditionary Medal, the Armed Forces Expeditionary Medal, the Southwest Asia Campaign Medal, the Vietnam Service Medal, and the Kuwait Liberation Medal. She was mothballed in Suisun Bay, California at 38° 4'37.86"N, 122° 5'24.66"W from 1997 until 2006 while a group tried to save her as a museum in Long Beach, California.

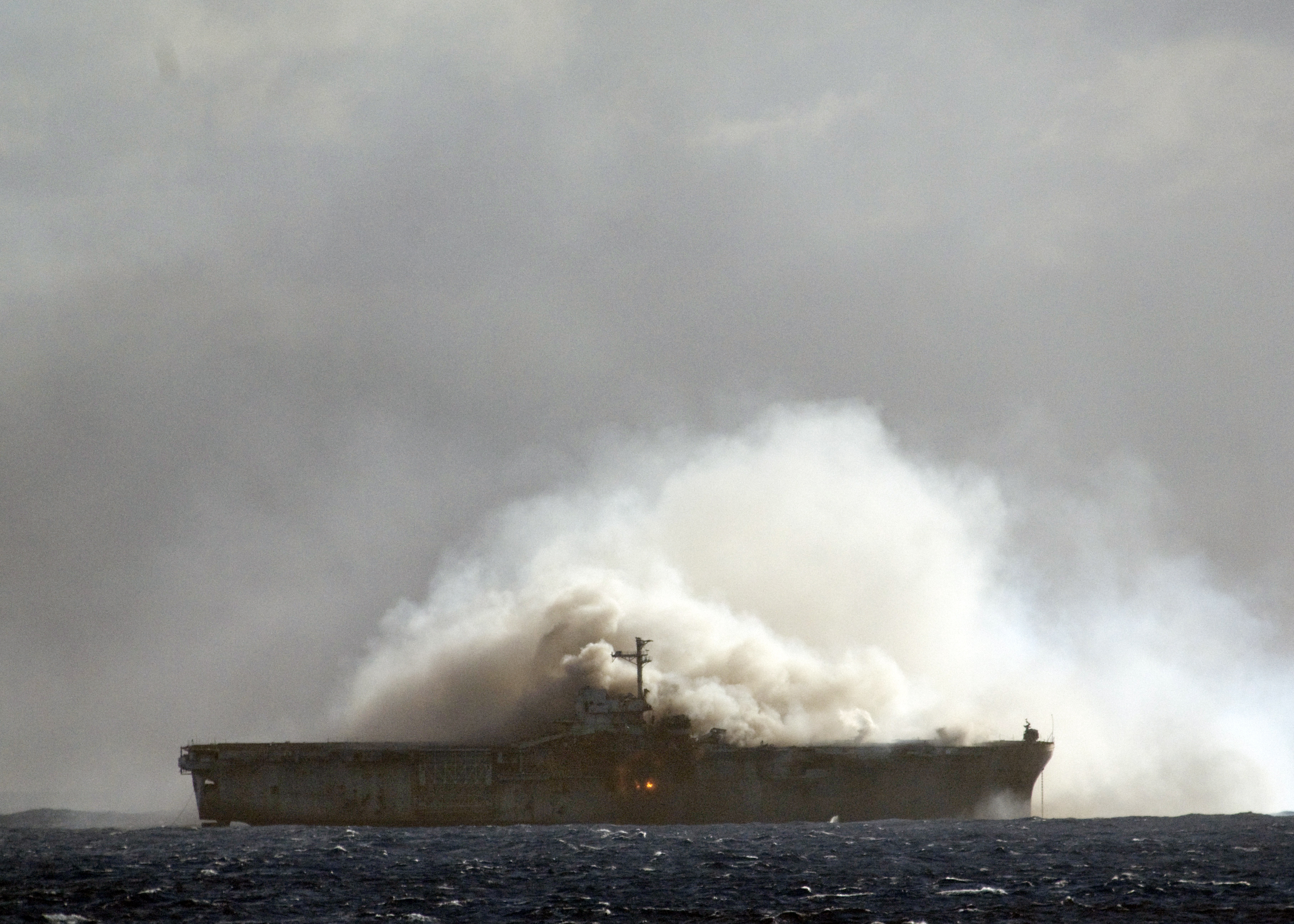
New Orleans takes fire from a line of surface combat ships from four countries during SINKEX

In 2006, the ship was relocated to Pearl Harbor to be prepared for a 'SINKEX'. In February 2008, New Orleans was listed for scrapping, instead of sinking, however, as of June 2010, New Orleans was once again scheduled to be sunk. Finally, New Orleans was sunk on 10 July 2010 during the RIMPAC 2010 exercise. The ship first sustained direct hits by at least seven Harpoon missiles. After the Harpoon strikes, B-52s from 2d Bomb Wing and 5th Bomb Wing dropped five 2000-pound GBU-10 precision bombs. As the ship began to list, a joint force of the five participating nations – United States, Japan, Australia, Canada and France – struck the ship with the majority hitting above the water line.

== Awards ==
- Navy Unit Commendation
- Navy Meritorious Unit Commendation
- Navy Battle "E" with 6 awards
- Navy Expeditionary Medal
- National Defense Service Medal
- Armed Forces Expeditionary Medal
- Vietnam Service Medal with 5 awards
- Southwest Asia Service Medal with 2 awards
- Philippine Presidential Unit Citation
- Republic of Vietnam Gallantry Cross Unit Citation
- Republic of Vietnam Campaign Medal
- Kuwait Liberation Medal (Kuwait)

== Gallery ==
USS New Orleans lifecycle

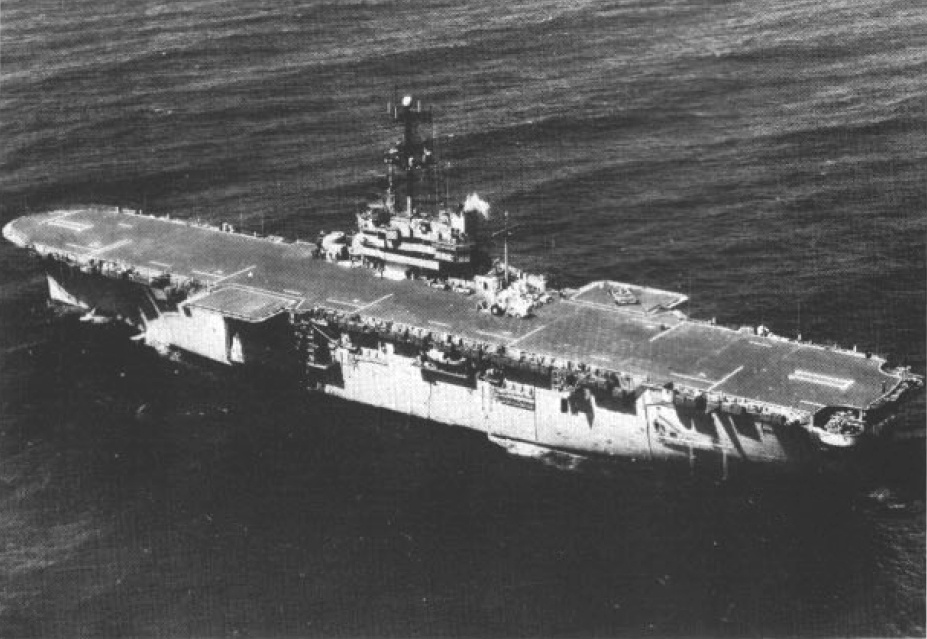
USS New Orleans at sea in c1969.

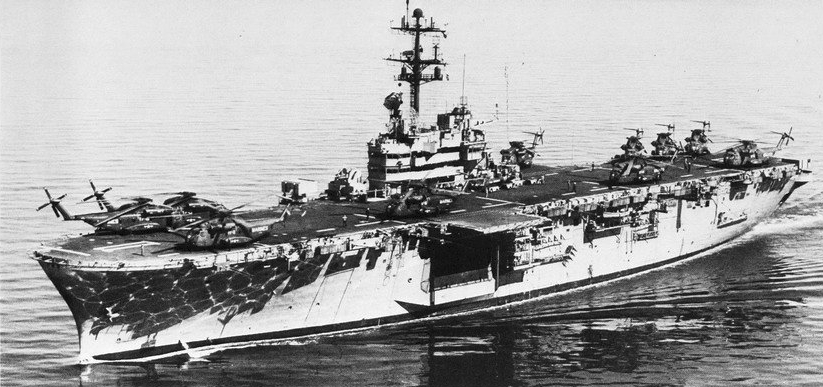
USS New Orleans underway in 1974.

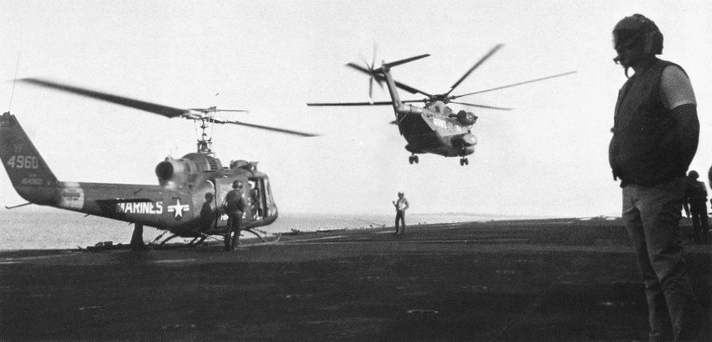
Marine UH-1E on USS New Orleans in 1974.

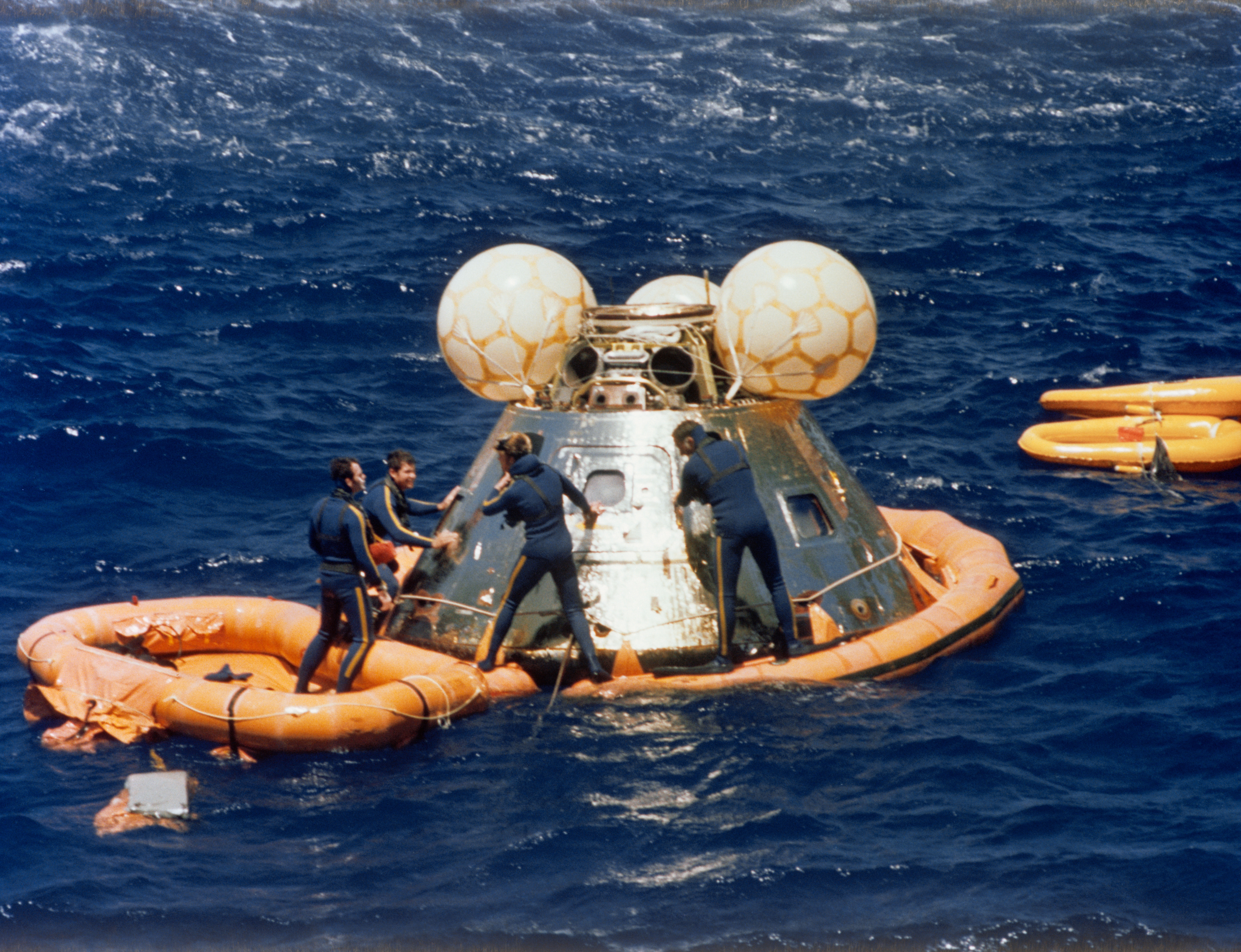
US Navy divers from USS New Orleans recovering the ASTP Apollo Command Module in July 1973.

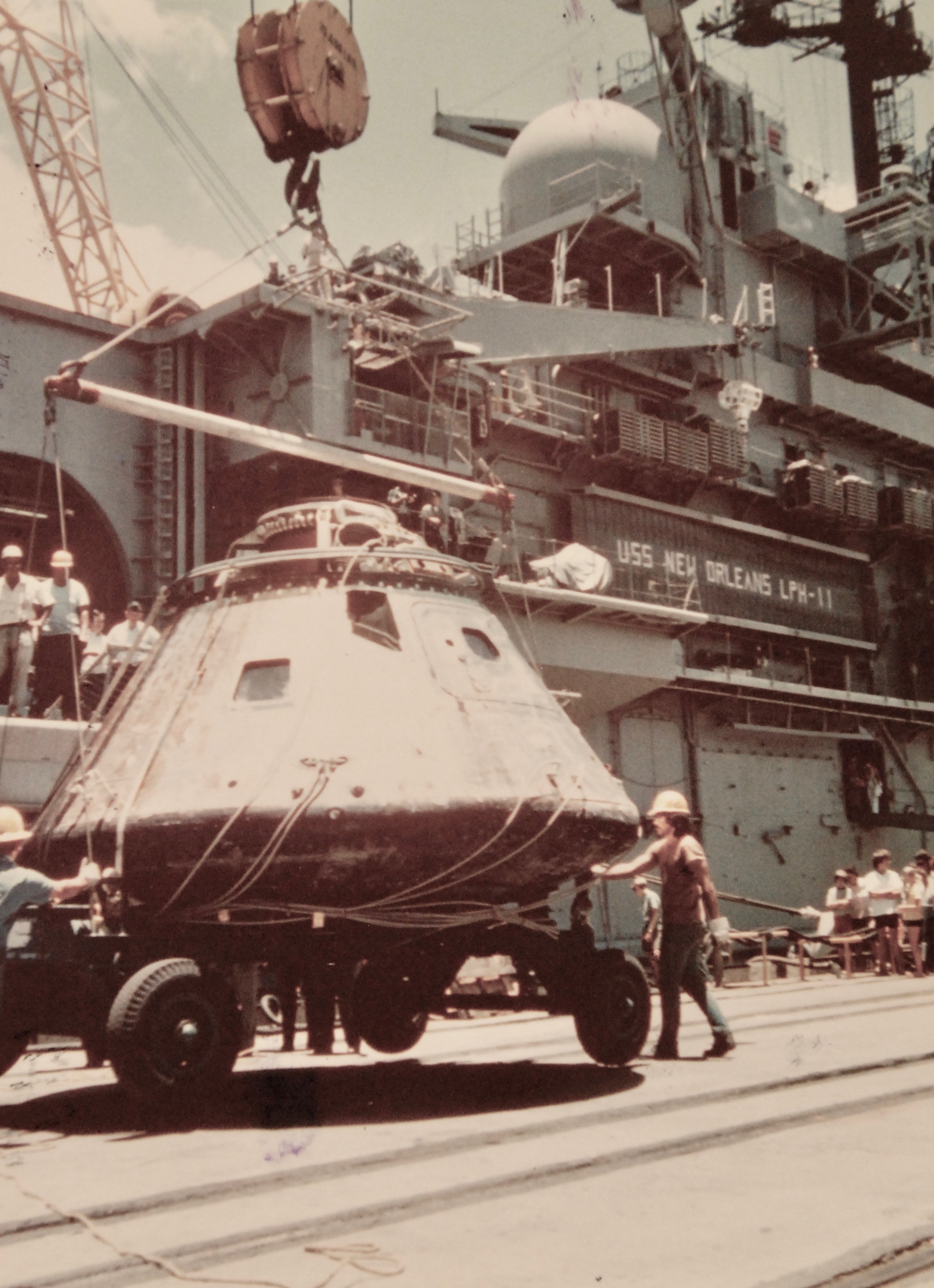
A crane lowers the Apollo CSM-111 capsule at Pearl Harbor from USS New Orleans on 25 July 1975.

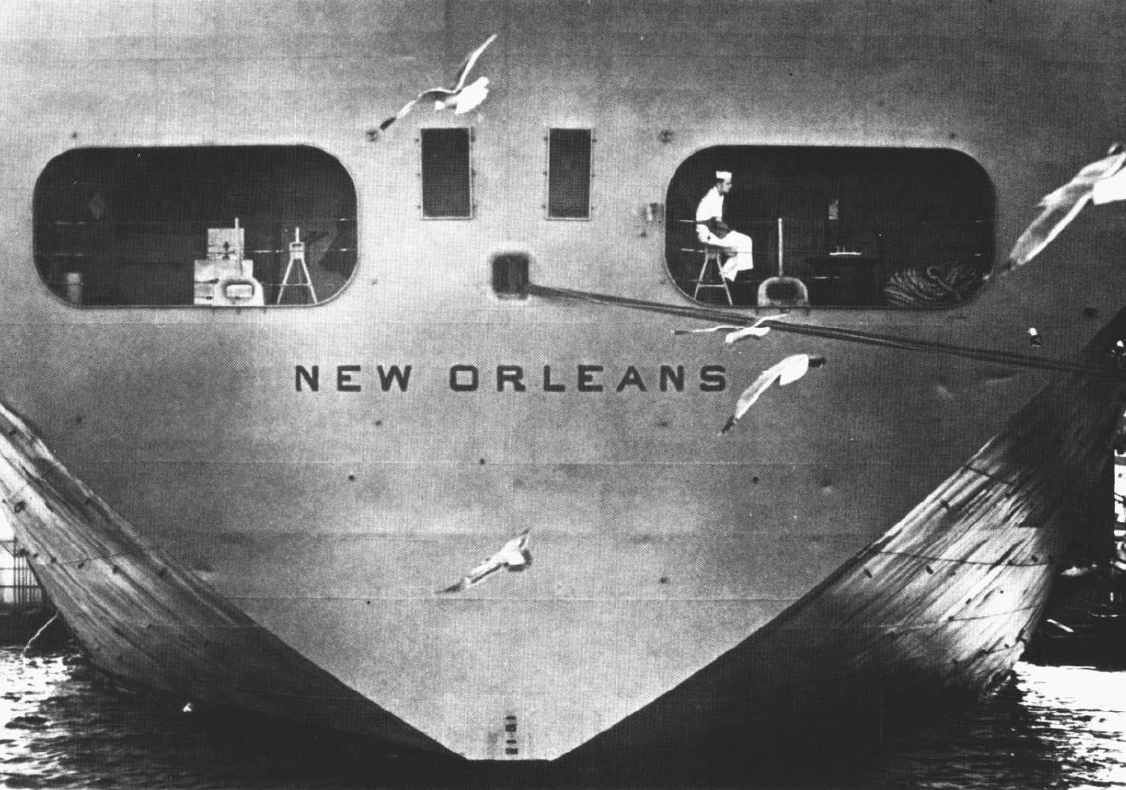
Stern view of USS New Orleans in 1985.

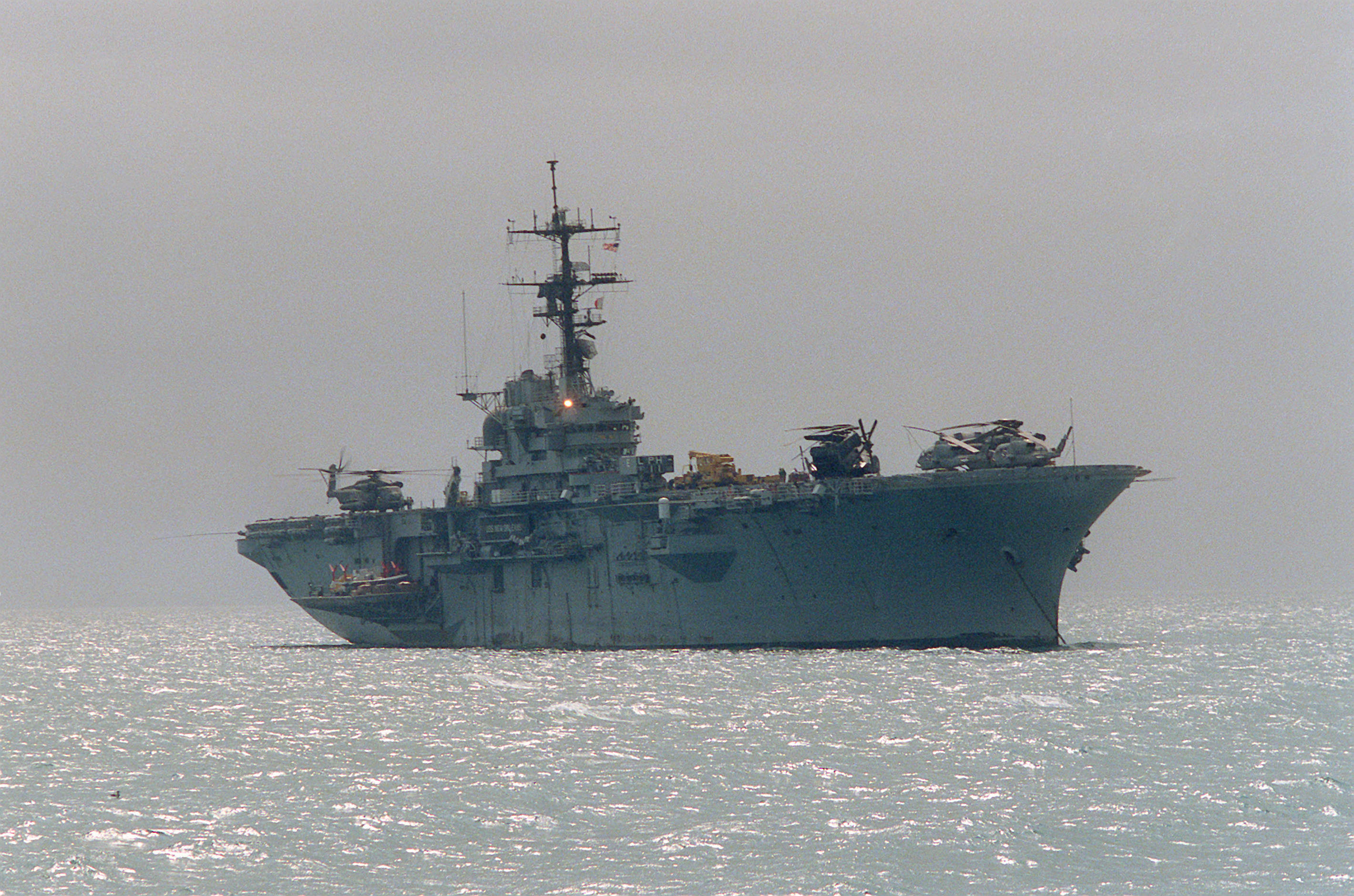
USS New Orleans in 1991.
