= ESTEEM Program =

M.S. program at the University of Notre Dame

The Engineering, Science & Technology Entrepreneurship Excellence Masters Program also known as the ESTEEM Program is an entrepreneurship master's program and collaborative effort between the Mendoza College of Business, College of Science, and College of Engineering at the University of Notre Dame. The 1-year program includes business courses covering finance, marketing, strategy, leadership, project management, quality, operations research, and ethics as well as science and/or engineering electives and a capstone thesis project.

The program primarily admits students who have received bachelor's degrees in science, engineering, or mathematics, or have equivalent experience in these fields. It claims to be unique in the sense that it puts students in the context of a real-time startup environment and requires students to outline a business plan, financial model, and marketing strategy for existing or ongoing research by Notre Dame students, professors, or industry partners.

The program confers approximately 30 M.S. in Engineering, Science, and Technology Entrepreneurship degrees each year.

== History ==
Founded in 1842 by a priest of the Congregation of Holy Cross, Notre Dame is an independent, national Catholic research university located adjacent to the city of South Bend, Indiana, in a metropolitan area of more than 300,000 residents approximately 90 miles east of Chicago. The graduate school, established in 1918, encompasses 48 master's and 26 doctoral degree programs in and among 30 University departments and institutes. Admission to the university is considered highly competitive.

The ESTEEM Program began in 2011 with the appointment of David Murphy as the director of the program. Murphy had previously served as the president and chief executive officer of Better World Books.

== Facilities ==
=== Innovation Park ===
Innovation Park is 12-acre campus located just south of the main University of Notre Dame campus. Built in 2009, the facility contains 55,000 square feet of office and research space with the stated goal of fostering creativity and innovation. In addition to the ESTEEM program, the facility is home to several start-up and venture firms.
