= USS Illusive (AM-448) =

Minesweeper of the United States Navy

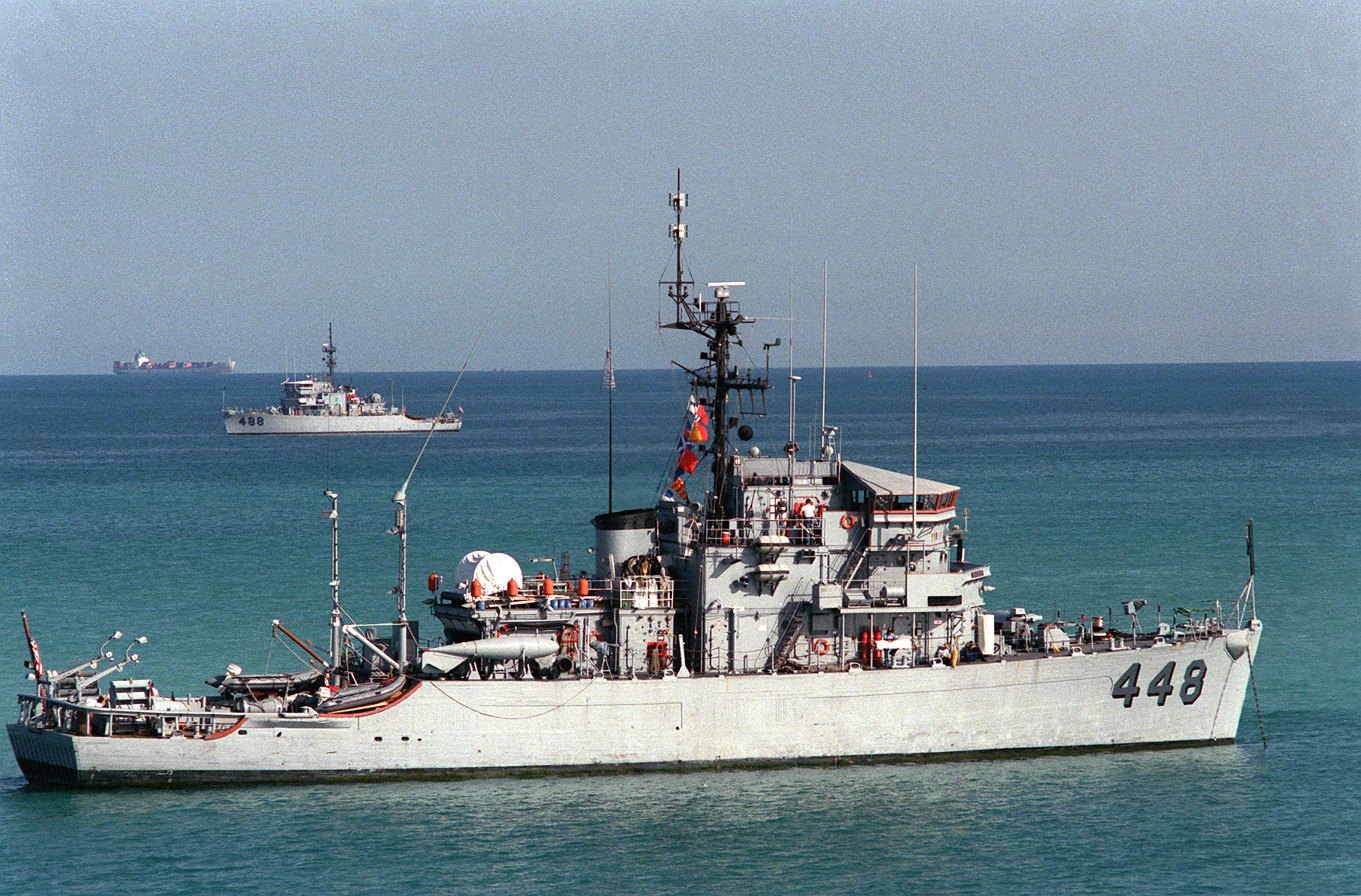

History

United States
- Builder: Martinolich Shipbuilding Co., San Diego, California
- Laid down: 23 October 1951
- Launched: 12 July 1952
- Commissioned: 14 November 1953
- Decommissioned: 30 March 1990
- Stricken: 1 June 1990
- Home port: Long Beach, California
- Fate: Sold, 9 February 1993

General characteristics
- Class & type: Agile class minesweeper
- Displacement: 620 tons
- Length: 172 ft (52.43 m)
- Beam: 36 ft (10.97 m)
- Draught: 10 ft (3.05 m)
- Propulsion: Four Packard ID1700 diesel engines, two shafts, two controllable pitch propellers
- Speed: 16 knots
- Complement: 74
- Armament: one 40 mm mount

USS Illusive (AM-448/MSO-448) was an Agile-class minesweeper acquired by the U.S. Navy for the task of removing mines that had been placed in the water to prevent the safe passage of ships.

Illusive (AM-448) was launched by Martinolich Shipbuilding Co., San Diego, California, 12 July 1952; sponsored by Mrs. Vito Marino; and commissioned 14 November 1953.

== West Coast operations ==
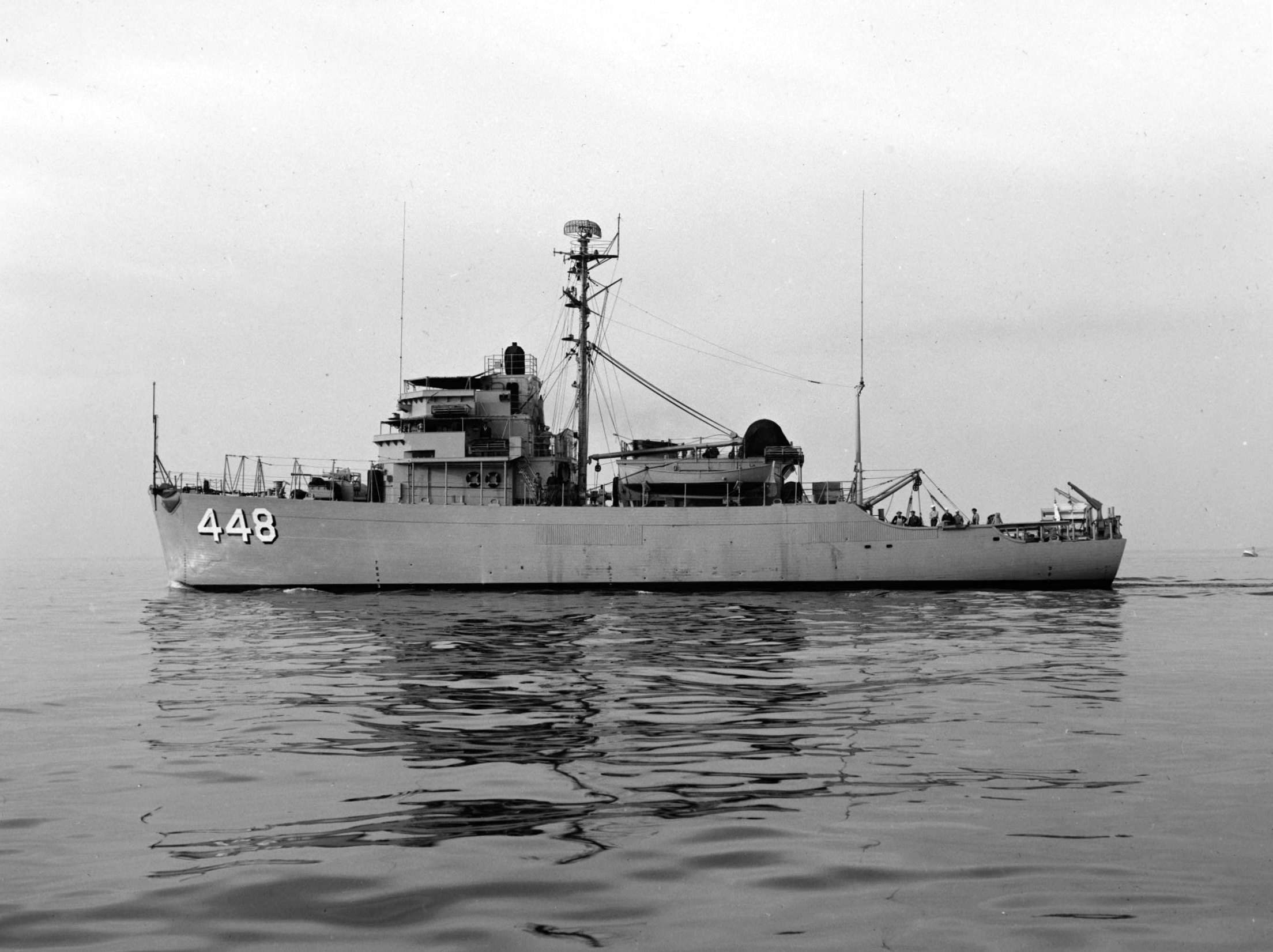
Illusive in 1953.

After shakedown and individual ship training out of Long Beach, California, during 1954, the ship entered Long Beach shipyard for extensive modifications October 1954 to February 1953. She was reclassified MSO-448 7 February 1955. She continued to operate out of Long Beach, taking part in a major U.S. Pacific Fleet training exercise in November 1955. For the next year she trained in California waters.

== Illusive replaces her engines ==
Illusive again entered the yard in November 1956, this time to replace her engines with experimental Packard models, and until May 1957 was engaged in engineering evaluation trials. She then sailed for her first deployment to the Far East 1 August 1957. Through December she took part in the vital operations of the U.S. 7th Fleet for the maintenance of peace and security in East Asia. She took part in joint exercises with Japanese naval units 6–9 October and with the Chinese Nationalist Navy 15 to 17 December 1957. Illusive returned to Long Beach 15 February 1958.

== Second Far East deployment ==
The remainder of 1958 was spent in training operations out of Long Beach. In 1959 she remained in California waters, and took part in a large amphibious exercise off Camp Pendleton. Illusive then made-ready for her second deployment to the western Pacific, sailing 8 January 1960 for Japan. During this critical period, in which American Navy ships were increasingly active in helping to prevent Communist takeover of the countries of Southeast Asia, the minesweeper carried out maneuvers off Japan, the Philippines, and Okinawa. Illusive returned to Long Beach 19 July 1960.

== Thailand operations ==
The year 1961 saw the ship return to the Far East. She sailed 24 August and operated in the Philippines as well as out of Guam and Formosa. She moved to Sattahib, Thailand, 25 November, as American ships demonstrated support for that nation, and in December visited Bangkok, Thailand, and Saigon, capital of South Vietnam. During this period Illusive conducted training exercises with several Southeast Asian navies. She was particularly active in training South Vietnamese officers and men until sailing for Long Beach 3 March 1982.

The veteran ship returned to the far Pacific in August 1963 and after stopping at island bases along the way arrived Sasebo 23 September. In the months that followed Illusive took part in U.S. 7th Fleet training with Korean, Nationalist Chinese and Japanese minesweepers. She returned to Long Beach 7 March 1964 for yard overhaul, followed by refresher training off the coast of southern California.

== Supporting Operation Market Time ==
On 13 August 1965 Illusive departed Long Beach for training in the Pacific Ocean that took her to Hawaii, the Marshalls, the Marianas, and the Philippines. She stood out of Subic Bay 2 October 1965 to join the "Market Time Patrol" vigilantly trying to stop the coastal flow of contraband by junks and boats to Vietcong the full length of Vietnam's 1,000-mile coastline. Her patrol service may include acting as a mother ship for replenishing the needs of "Swift" boats, providing gunfire support to U.S. forces ashore, or conducting a hydrographic survey on shoreline depths, in addition to patrolling thousands of miles within the inspection zone to intercept Vietcong men and supplies. Illusive continued this vital duty until she turned homeward in February 1966. The minesweeper reached Long Beach 28 April. She operated along the U.S. West Coast for the remainder of 1966 and into 1967. Returned from a Westpac deployment in April 1969.

== Final status ==
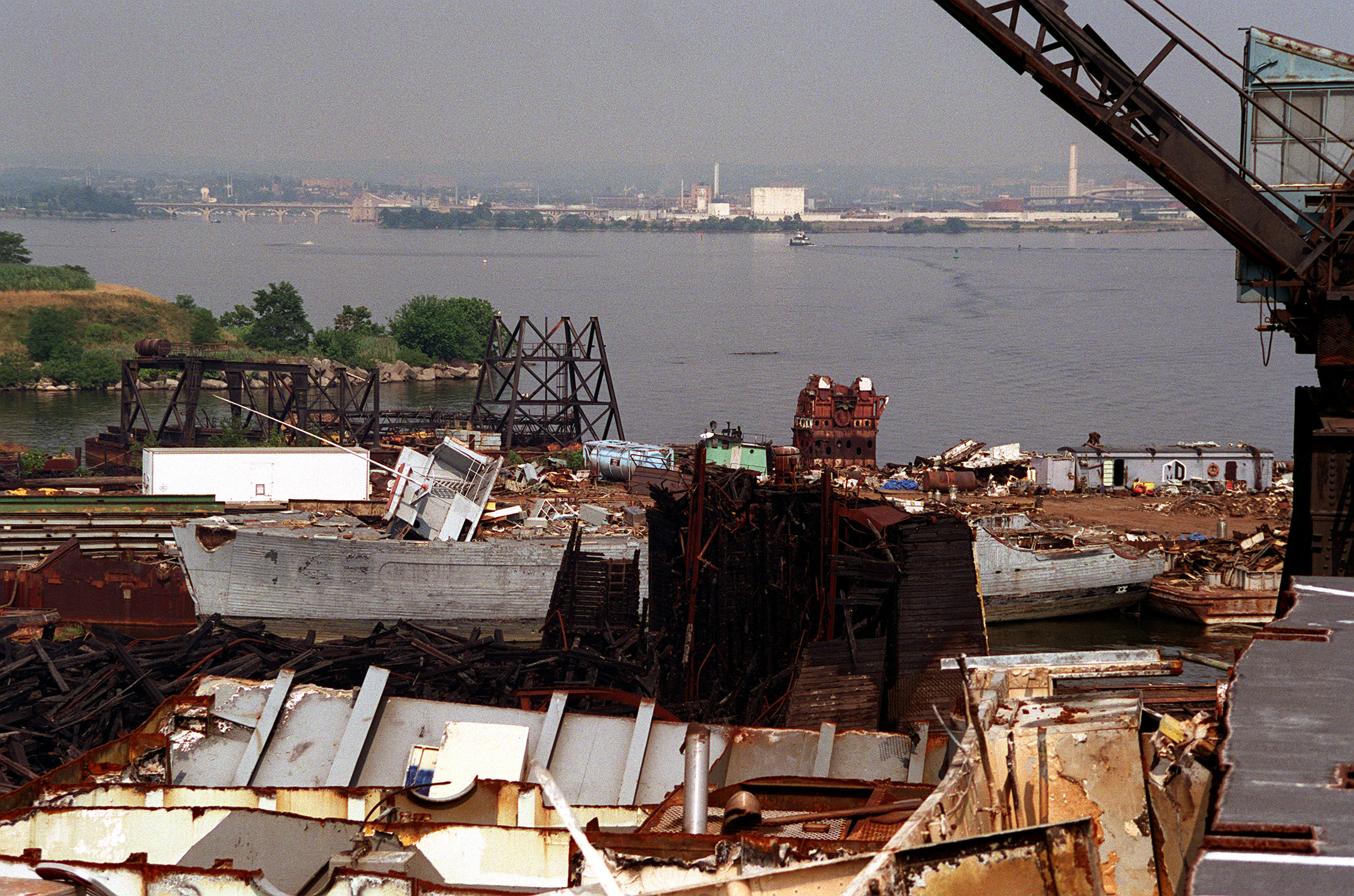
USS Illusive being scrapped at Baltimore, Maryland (USA), in July 1994.

Illusive was finally decommissioned on 30 March 1990 and was stricken from the Naval Register on 1 June 1990. She was sold by Navy sale for scrap on 9 February 1993 for the sum of $12,000.
