= Steem (peanut butter) =

Brand of caffeinated peanut butter

- Steem logo
- Type: Peanut butter
- Course: Snack
- Place of origin: Greenfield, Massachusetts
- Created by: Chris Pettazzoni, Keith Barnofski and Andrew Brach
- Invented: 2014
- Main ingredients: Peanuts, peanut oil, salt, agave nectar, caffeine
- Food energy (per 36 g serving): 210 kcal (880 kJ)
Nutritional value
(per 36 g serving)
- Protein: 8 g
- Fat: 18 g
- Carbohydrate: 8 g
- Other information: Discontinued in 2019

Steem (often stylized STEEM) was a brand of caffeinated peanut butter produced by STEEM Peanut Butter, Inc. The company was co-founded by Chris Pettazzoni, Keith Barnofski, and Andrew Brach and was based in Greenfield, Massachusetts. Sold in the United States between 2014 and 2019, the peanut butter was predominantly marketed as an alternative to coffee as a source of the stimulant caffeine. In 2015, US senator Chuck Schumer publicly criticized the high levels of caffeine in Steem, leading to the company being contacted by the Food and Drug Administration as part of a wider investigation into foods containing additional caffeine.

== History and product ==
Steem was originally conceived as a potential hangover cure; the idea of adding caffeine to peanut butter occurred while the inventors were preparing various sandwiches containing the spread. Powdered, flavourless caffeine extracted from coffee beans was procured from a company in Virginia specializing in producing anhydrous caffeine for use in dietary supplements. Barnofski, who had experience as a sous-chef, began devising recipes for the new product, incorporating the caffeine by mixing it with the fat from the peanut butter. Production space was rented at a community center in Greenfield and Steem was launched in March 2014, around two years after its initial conception. The peanut butter retailed at $4.99 per jar and was sold online through the company's website, as well as in a small number of retailers and gymnasiums around New England. By January 2016, the price had risen to $6 per eight-ounce jar.

Steem was marketed primarily as a source of energy due to the added caffeine. Its creators claimed that the slower digestion time of peanut butter compared to other sources of caffeine meant that the stimulant was absorbed into the body over a longer period and at a lower concentration, thus offering a "more mellow" experience without the "jitters, heart palpitations and stained teeth" associated with coffee consumption. The spread was also promoted towards bodybuilders due to its high protein content, and the label on the jar highlighted the use of exclusively natural ingredients (peanuts, peanut oil, salt, agave nectar, and caffeine) in Steem's production.

In November 2015, US senator for New York, Chuck Schumer, called on the Food and Drug Administration (FDA) to investigate Steem. He claimed that its high caffeine content could pose a danger to health, especially in children. A recommended two-tablespoon serving of Steem contained 150 milligrams of caffeine, as much as two cups of coffee or five cans of Coca-Cola. Schumer suggested the introduction of limits on additional caffeine and warning labels on products with caffeine added. The FDA subsequently sent a letter to the creators of Steem on December 15, 2015, requesting more information about the use of caffeine in the product. The letter was part of a wider investigation by the FDA into foods containing additional caffeine that could be marketed towards younger people. A message on the company's website warned that Steem was not suitable for pets such as dogs and cats.

As of October 2019, the company's website had been updated to state that Steem was no longer in production.

== See also ==
- Alert (gum)
- Caffeinated drink
- Caffeinated alcoholic drink
- Penguin Mints
