= USS Esteem =

Minesweeper of the United States Navy

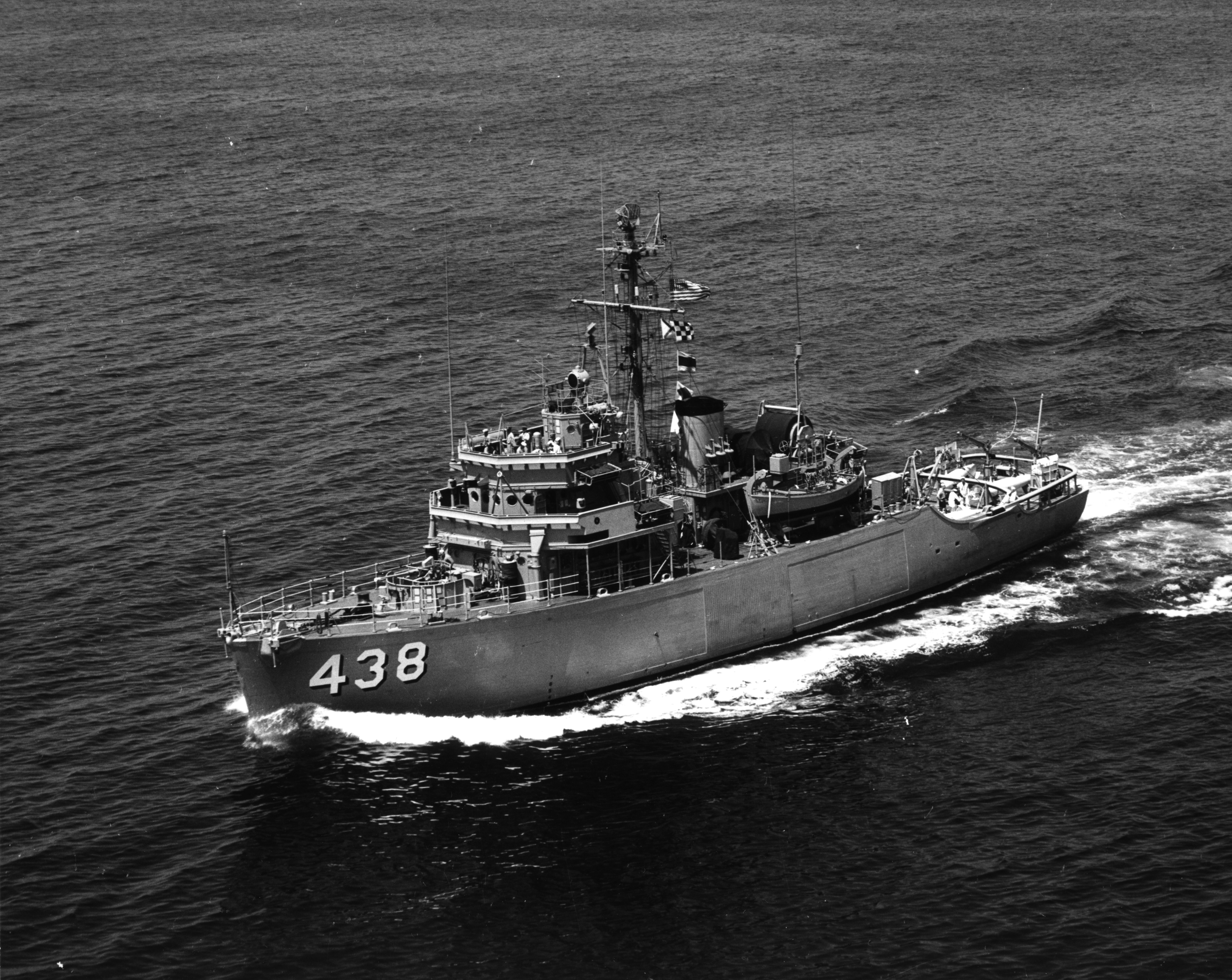

History

United States
- Builder: Martinolich Shipbuilding Co., San Diego, California
- Laid down: 1 September 1952
- Launched: 20 December 1952
- Commissioned: 10 September 1955
- Decommissioned: 20 September 1991
- Reclassified: MSO-438, 7 February 1955
- Stricken: 30 September 1991
- Home port: Long Beach, California, Seattle, Washington
- Motto: First in the Field
- Fate: Scrapped in 2000

General characteristics
- Class & type: Agile-class minesweeper
- Displacement: 853 tons (full load)
- Length: 172 ft (52 m)
- Beam: 36 ft (11 m)
- Draft: 10 ft (3.0 m)
- Propulsion: 4 Waukesha Main Propulsion Diesel Engines, 2 shafts, controllable pitch propellers
- Speed: 14 knots
- Complement: 72
- Sensors & processing systems: AN/SQQ-14 Minehunting Sonar, AN/SPS-64 Surface Search Radar
- Armament: 2 × .50 cal (12.7 mm) machine guns

USS Esteem (AM-438/MSO-438) was an Agile-class minesweeper acquired by the U.S. Navy for the task of removing mines that had been placed in the water to prevent the safe passage of ships.

The first ship to be named Esteem by the Navy, AM-438 was launched 20 December 1952 by Martinolich Shipbuilding Co., San Diego, California; sponsored by Mrs. C. H. Davis; reclassified MSO-438, 7 February 1955; and commissioned 10 September 1955.

Deployed to Persian Gulf from 1987 to 1990 under President Reagan's direction to protect the world's oil supply from the threat of Iranian mines (the "Tanker War"). Participated in Operation EARNEST WILL.

== West Coast and Far East operations ==
Esteem sailed out of Long Beach, California, her first home port, for training in mine warfare and minesweeping exercises along the U.S. West Coast until 4 March 1957, when she departed for her first tour of duty with the U.S. 7th Fleet in the Far East. Along with visiting Japanese and Korean ports and Hong Kong, she exercised with the mines of the navies of the Republic of China and the Republic of Korea, aiding in the training of friendly forces in new techniques.

Returning to Long Beach in September 1957, Esteem resumed her west coast operations for the next year, then sailed 6 October 1960 for exercises with the Royal Canadian Navy off Nootka Sound, British Columbia. During the next month, she circumnavigated Vancouver Island, and visited several Canadian ports, returning to Long Beach 5 November.

During her 1961-62 tour of duty in the Far East, she again exercised with ships of the Chinese Navy, and also visited Bangkok, Thailand, to train with the Royal Thai navy. In December 1961, she went to Saigon, Vietnam and worked with the Vietnamese navy. Based out of Danang she provided patrol off the coast of Vietnam through May 1962. On June 27th of 1962, she began an overhaul which continued through most of the remainder of the year.

== Final status ==
Esteem was decommissioned in Seattle, Washington on 20 September 1991 and stricken on 30 September 1991. She was sold for scrapping in 2000.

== Unit awards ==
17 unit awards, including:

- Navy Unit Commendation
- Combat Action Ribbon (x 2)
- Armed Forces Expeditionary Medal (x 4)
- Vietnam Service Medal (x 6)
- Republic of Vietnam Meritorious Unit Citation, Gallantry Cross Medal Color with Palm (x 3)
- SECNAV Letter of Commendation
