= USS Pipit (AMc-1) =

Minesweeper of the United States Navy

History

United States
- Name: USS Pipit
- Namesake: Pipit
- Builder: Martinolich Shipyard, Tacoma, Washington
- Launched: 1936, as MV Spartan
- Acquired: 18 October 1940
- Commissioned: 28 March 1941, as USS Pipit (AMc-1)
- Decommissioned: 6 October 1944
- Stricken: 22 December 1944
- Fate: Returned to owner

General characteristics
- Class & type: Pipit-class coastal minesweeper
- Displacement: 210 long tons (213 t)
- Length: 83 ft 11 in (25.58 m)
- Beam: 22 ft 6 in (6.86 m)
- Propulsion: Diesel engine, one shaft
- Speed: 10 knots (19 km/h; 12 mph)
- Armament: 2 × .30 cal (7.62 mm) machine guns

USS Pipit (AMc-1) was a Pipit-class coastal minesweeper acquired by the United States Navy for use in World War II. Her task was to clear minefields in coastal waterways.

Pipit was built as M/V Spartan in 1936 by Martinolich Shipyard, Tacoma, Washington; acquired by the U.S. Navy at San Diego, California, on 18 October 1940, by purchase from Mr. Anton Sumic; conversion by Wilmington Boat Works, San Pedro, California, and completed on 22 March 1941; and placed in service on 28 March 1941.

== World War II East Coast operations ==
Assigned to the 15th Naval District, Pipit departed San Diego, California, 10 May 1941. She arrived and reported for duty in the Panama Canal Zone on 22 May 1941. From then until August 1944, Pipit performed coastal minesweeping duties for the Panamanian Sea Frontier.

== Decommissioning ==
Following departure from Balboa, Panama, Pipit arrived at San Diego, California, on 26 August 1944. Placed out of service on 6 October 1944, she was struck from the Navy List on 22 December 1944 and returned to her owner by the War Shipping Administration.
