= USS Inflict (AM-456) =

Minesweeper of the United States Navy

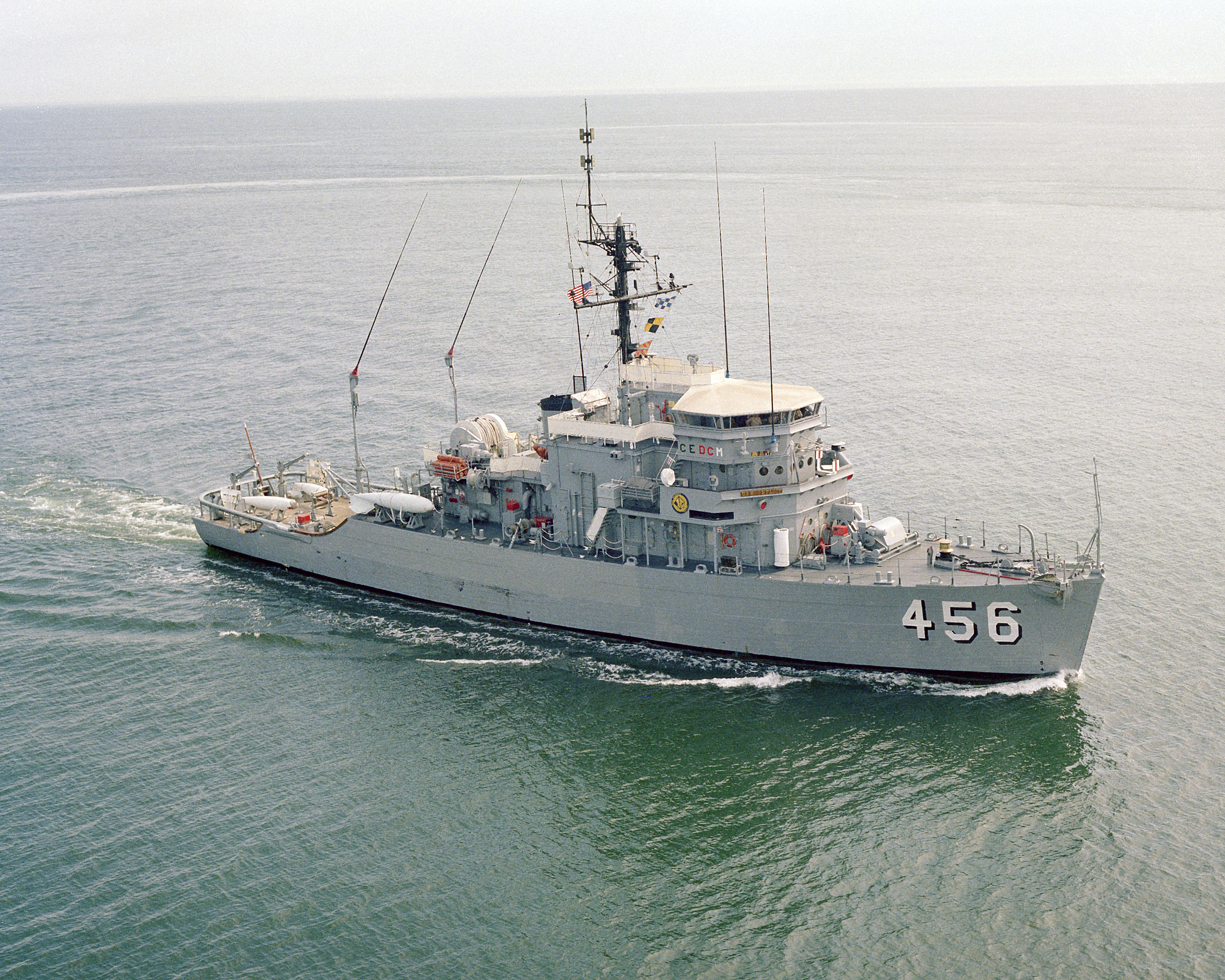

History

United States
- Builder: Wilmington Boat Works, Wilmington, Los Angeles
- Laid down: 29 October 1952
- Launched: 16 October 1953
- Commissioned: 11 May 1954
- Decommissioned: 30 March 1990
- Stricken: 23 May 1990
- Home port: Long Beach, California
- Fate: Sold, 1 December 1992

General characteristics
- Class & type: Aggressive class minesweeper
- Displacement: 620 tons
- Length: 172 ft (52.43 m)
- Beam: 36 ft (10.97 m)
- Draught: 10 ft (3.05 m)
- Propulsion: Four Packard ID1700 diesel engines, two shafts, two controllable pitch propellers
- Speed: 16 knots (30 km/h)
- Complement: 72
- Armament: one 40 mm mount

USS Inflict (AM-456/MSO-456) was a U.S. Navy Aggressive-class minesweeper. Like all minesweepers, the ship was designed to remove mines placed in the water to prevent safe passage.

The second ship to be named Inflict by the Navy, AM-456 was launched 16 October 1953 by Wilmington Boat Works, Wilmington, Los Angeles; sponsored by Mrs. Robert E. Carlson; and commissioned on 11 May 1954.

== West Coast operations ==
After shakedown along the U.S. West Coast, Inflict engaged in sonar and minesweeping exercises until she departed Long Beach, California, 1 July for the western Pacific Ocean. After arriving at Yokosuka, Japan on 5 August, she began operations with the navies of South Korea, Nationalist China, and Japan, In February 1955, she was reclassified MSO 456. Inflict returned to Long Beach on 17 February 1956 and spent the remainder of the year on training operations.

== Second Far East tour ==
In 1957, Inflict continued operations off California and Mexico, helping to maintainantisubmarine warfare forces. The minesweeper sailed on 3 January 1958 to the Far East, arriving as a crisis loomed in Indonesia.

From 19 to 22 March 1958, Inflict participated in Exercise Bulwark, the first bilateral exercise between Philippine and U.S. Navy. It took part in the third phase of the exercise, in waters off Corregidor and Caballo Islands.

Inflict participated in joint exercises with the Thailand, and Chinese Nationalist navies before returning to Long Beach on 15 July.

== West Coast exercises ==
For the next 20 months she trained in California waters. On 3 May 1960, Inflict sailed again for six months of joint operations with U.S. allies in Asia, and returned to Long Beach on 16 November.

In 1961, Inflict was engaged in minesweeping operations and midshipman training out of Long Beach.

She sailed 7 April 1962 for exercises in Hawaiian waters, and returning to Long Beach on 17 August.

In 1963, in addition to training in California waters, Inflict sailed on 28 October for joint countermeasure exercises with Canada, and returned to Long Beach on 3 December.

On 22 May 1964, she sailed for duty in the Far East, operating with the friendly navies, and during the summer was deployed for service along South Vietnam. Inflict returned to Long Beach on 7 December.

== Supporting Market Time operations ==
She sailed for the Far East on 7 February 1966. Arriving Subic Bay on 28 March, she headed for her "Market Time" station on 5 April. There, she patrolled to prevent the infiltration of arms and men from North Vietnam to the south. She left the war zone on 1 November and returned to Long Beach on 13 December.

Inflict operated on the West Coast through mid-November 1967, when she again sailed for the Far East, with stops in Hawaii, Kwajalein, and Guam, arriving in Subic Bay at the beginning of January 1968. She was on her "Market Time" patrol station when the USS Pueblo was captured in January and during the Tet Offensive in February 1968. She sailed from Subic Bay for the US West Coast in May and arrived in Long Beach in late June.

Overhauled in Dillingham Shipyards in Hawaii with the Force MSO445, Fortify MSO446, Impervious MSO 449: replaced Packard diesel engine with Waukasha L1616 turbo diesels. December 1971, following overhaul the 4 ships changed Home port to Guam and became MineFlot 1 under Commander Lloyd Boucher. The Inflict made several Market Time tours from 1971 thru 1973. More memorable events Oct.31 1972 Engineroom fire due to error by Lead EN on watch, failed to apply cooling water to clutch while engine idled. Disabled port shaft had to be towed to Subic Bay for repairs. A month later the Inflict with USS King DLG 10 and United States Coast and Geodetic Survey team of 4 collected bottom samples and data in preparation for removing US mines from North Vietnamese harbors etc. Leaving the area off Haiphong Harbor they encountered a convoy of over 40 Chinese junks with DPR of China flags. The Inflict and Mine Flotilla 1 took part in the removal of US mines with the first helicopter minesweepers.

== Persian Gulf service ==
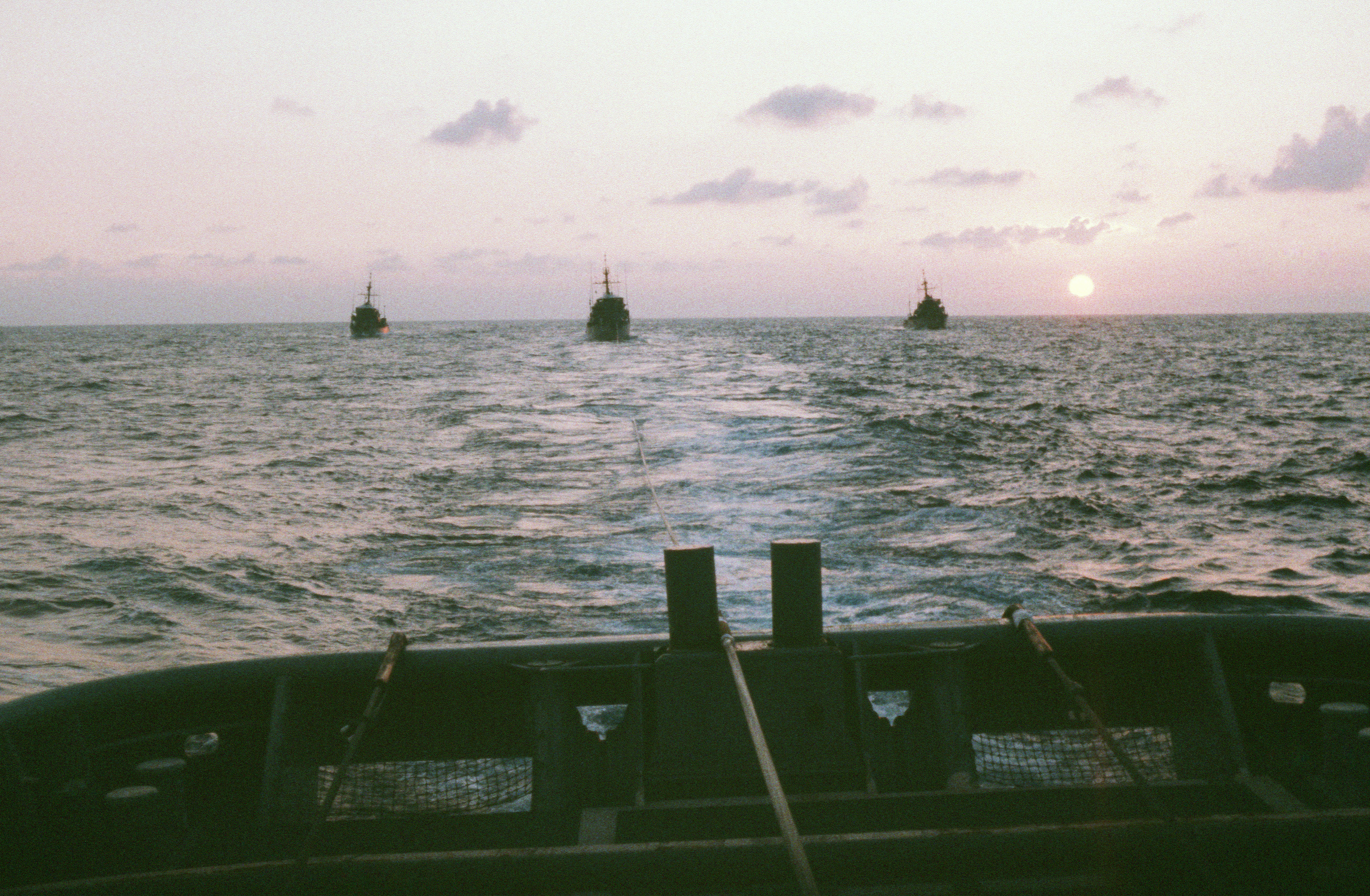
USS Grapple tows USS Inflict, USS Fearless and USS Illusive.

On 6 September 1987, USS Grapple (ARS-53) left Little Creek, Virginia, with three minesweepers in tow: USS Fearless (MSO-442), USS Illusive (MSO-448), and Inflict. They transited the Suez Canal and arrived in the Gulf of Oman on 2 November 1987. The 9,000-nautical-mile (17,000 km) trip set a record for the longest distance three ships were towed by one. While conducting minesweeping operations in the northern Persian Gulf, USS Inflict discovered and destroyed the first of ten underwater contact mines deployed in a field across the main shipping channel. These were the first underwater mines discovered and destroyed by the U.S. Navy since the Korean War. Inflict remained in the Persian Gulf to support Operation Earnest Will.

== Decommissioning ==
Decommissioned on 30 March 1990 Inflict was stricken 23 May 1990. On 1 December 1992, the Navy sold the ship for $12,000 for scrap.
