= USS Pluck (MSO-464) =

Minesweeper of the United States Navy

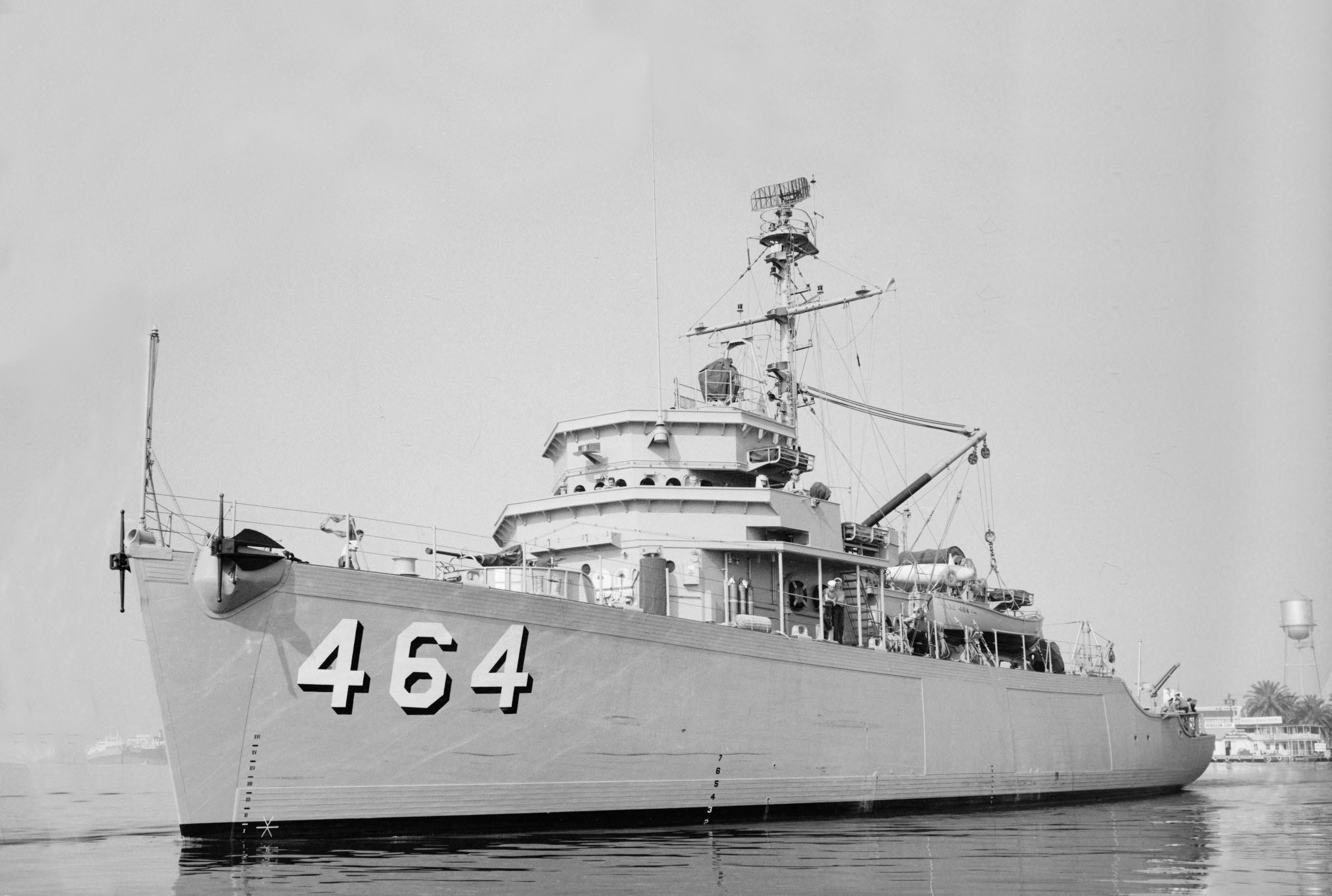
- USS Pluck (MSO-464) underway in 1954

History

United States
- Name: USS Pluck (MSO-464)
- Builder: Wilmington Boat Works
- Laid down: 31 March 1952
- Launched: 6 February 1954
- Commissioned: 11 August 1954
- Decommissioned: 29 November 1990
- Stricken: 16 January 1991
- Home port: Long Beach, California
- Fate: Scrapped, 1992

General characteristics
- Displacement: 630 tons
- Length: 172 ft (52 m)
- Beam: 36 ft (11 m)
- Draught: 10 ft (3.0 m)
- Speed: 15 knots
- Complement: 65
- Armament: one 40 mm mount

USS Pluck (AM-464/MSO-464) was an Agile-class minesweeper acquired by the U.S. Navy for the task of removing mines that had been placed in the water to prevent the safe passage of ships.

The second ship to be named Pluck by the Navy, MSO-464, a minesweeper, was laid down 31 March 1952 by Wilmington Boat Works, Wilmington, California; launched 6 February 1954; sponsored by Mrs. Robert J. Eaton; and commissioned 11 August 1954.

== West Coast operations ==
Following shakedown, Pluck reported for duty to Commander, Mine Forces, Pacific. She deployed to WestPac in January 1956, and returned in June to Long Beach, California, for overhaul. During January and February 1957 she assisted survey operations in Long Beach Harbor.

== Pacific Ocean operations ==
Assigned to WestPac 2 June 1958, Pluck operated off Taiwan in August and September during the Quemoy crisis. Deployed to WestPac 31 August 1960, she delivered four tons of textbooks to Batangas, Philippines, in January 1961, as part of Operation Handclasp. On her next assignment to WestPac 2 July 1962, Pluck made a good will tour of Mindanao and Panay Islands, Philippines, in September before returning to Long Beach, California. Upon completion of overhaul she rejoined her sister ships at Long Beach 15 October 1963.

== Later Pacific Ocean operations ==
After type training in Hawaiian waters, she deployed to WESTPAC 28 September 1964. During February and March 1965 she monitored coastal shipping off South Vietnam. On her next deployment to WestPac, 16 May 1966, she completed four more coastal patrols beginning July 1966 and ending 2 February 1967. In 1968 she underwent major overhaul from 29 January to 1 July, and, in November, participated in an evaluation of the Red Eye antiaircraft missile.

Into 1970 Pluck remained active with the U.S. Pacific Fleet.

Originally homeported in Long Beach, California, she was transferred to the Naval Reserve Fleet in July 1972, at which time she changed her homeport to San Diego, California. In 1980 she was drydocked in Long Beach CA and at that time was fitted with a newly developed sonar and GPS system that was very accurate compared to older methods of mine location. The operators of this device often bragged that not only could they find a beer can in 1500 ft of water - they could identify the brand of beer! As a direct result of her new sonar and related computer equipment, in 1981 she was credited with locating and salvaging a luxury yacht that had sunk off the coast of Monterey CA. Into 1988, 1989 and into 1990 Pluck remained active with the Pacific Fleet as a training platform for active duty and reserve personnel. She was decommissioned 29 November 1990 and was stricken from the Navy list 16 January 1991. She was sold for scrapping 1 December 1992.

PINS (Precise Integrated Navigation System) was the system that was being tested during this time. The product was created by Magnavox and was thoroughly tested during the early 1980s by the USS Pluck.

== Decommissioning ==
Pluck was decommissioned on 29 November 1990 and was struck from the Navy list on 16 January 1991. She was sold for scrap in 1992.
