= USS PGM-5 =

Gunboat of the United States Navy

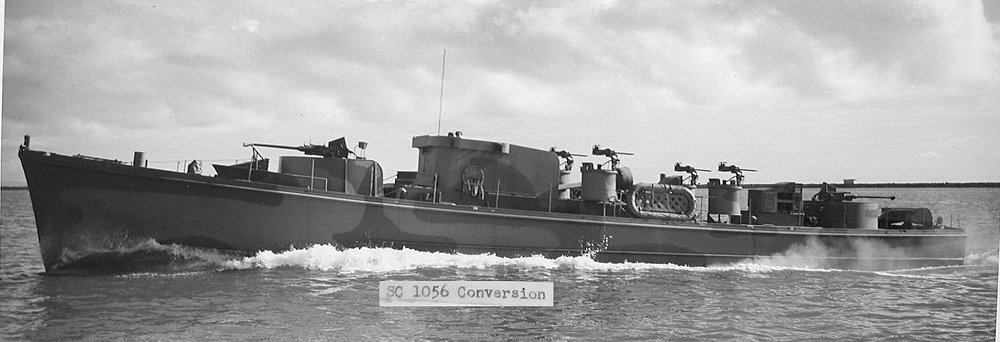
- USS PGM-5 after her conversion

History

United States
- Builder: Wilmington Boat Works
- Laid down: 14 May 1942
- Launched: 2 November 1942
- Commissioned: 15 June 1943
- Renamed: 10 December 1943
- Reclassified: 10 December 1943
- Fate: Unknown

General characteristics
- Displacement: 95 tons
- Length: 110 feet 10 inches
- Beam: 23
- Height: 10 feet 10 inches
- Propulsion: 2 × 1,540bhp Electro-Motive Corp. 16-184A diesel engines; 2 × shafts
- Speed: 21 knots
- Complement: 28
- Armament: 2 x 40 mm guns; 4 .50 cal (12.7 mm) machine gun; 1 × 60mm mortar

USS PGM-5 was a PGM-1 class motor gunboat that served in the United States Navy during World War II. She was originally laid down as an SC-497 class submarine chaser on 14 May 1942 by the Wilmington Boat Works in Wilmington, California and launched on 2 November 1942. She was commissioned as USS SC-1056 on 15 June 1943. She was later converted to a PGM-1 class motor gunboat and renamed PGM-5 on 10 December 1943. After the war she was transferred to the Foreign Liquidations Commission on 7 May 1947. Her exact fate is unknown.
