= USS Prime (AM-466) =

Minesweeper of the United States Navy

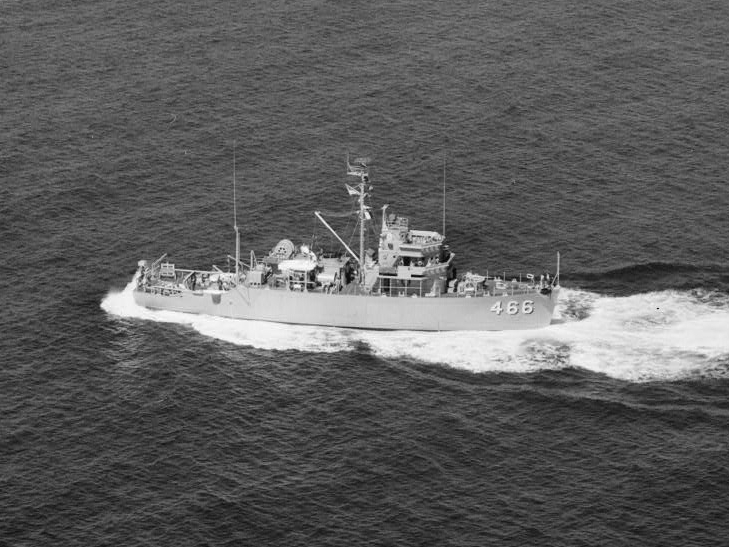
- USS Prime (MSO-466) underway in 1954

History

United States
- Name: USS Prime
- Builder: Wilmington Boat Works, Wilmington, California
- Laid down: 30 December 1952
- Launched: 27 May 1954
- Commissioned: 11 October 1954, as AM-466
- Reclassified: MSO-466, 7 February 1955
- Stricken: 1 October 1976
- Fate: Sold for scrapping, 7 January 1977

General characteristics
- Class & type: Agile-class minesweeper
- Displacement: 630 long tons (640 t) light; 775 long tons (787 t) full load
- Length: 172 ft (52 m)
- Beam: 35 ft (11 m)
- Draft: 10 ft (3 m)
- Propulsion: 4 × Packard ID1700 diesel engines; 2 × shafts; 2 × controllable pitch propellers
- Speed: 14 knots (26 km/h; 16 mph)
- Complement: 6 officers and 74 enlisted men
- Armament: 1 × single 40 mm gun mount (later replaced by 1 × twin 20 mm gun mount); 2 × .50 cal (12.7 mm) twin Browning M2 machine guns

USS Prime (AM-466/MSO-466), was an Agile-class minesweeper acquired by the U.S. Navy. She was laid down on 30 December 1952 by Wilmington Boat Works, Wilmington, California, launched on 27 May 1954; sponsored by Mrs. Louis Ets-Hokin and commissioned on 11 October 1954.

== Pacific Ocean operations ==
After Pacific shakedown, Prime was reclassified MSO-466 on 7 February 1955. She completed major modification on 3 October 1955, and deployed to the Western Pacific on 1 May 1956. Following regular overhaul and type training in 1957, she deployed to WestPac again on 3 November 1958. In 1959 she enhanced her operational readiness through maneuvers with the South Korean Navy in January, and participation in an amphibious landing exercise off Kodiak, Alaska, in November.

Upon completion of overhaul and type training in 1960, she deployed to WestPac on 4 January 1961 and upon return began another overhaul on 20 November 1961. After training she deployed to WestPac again on 16 November 1962. She returned to Long Beach, California, in June 1963, and completed overhaul on 31 January 1964.

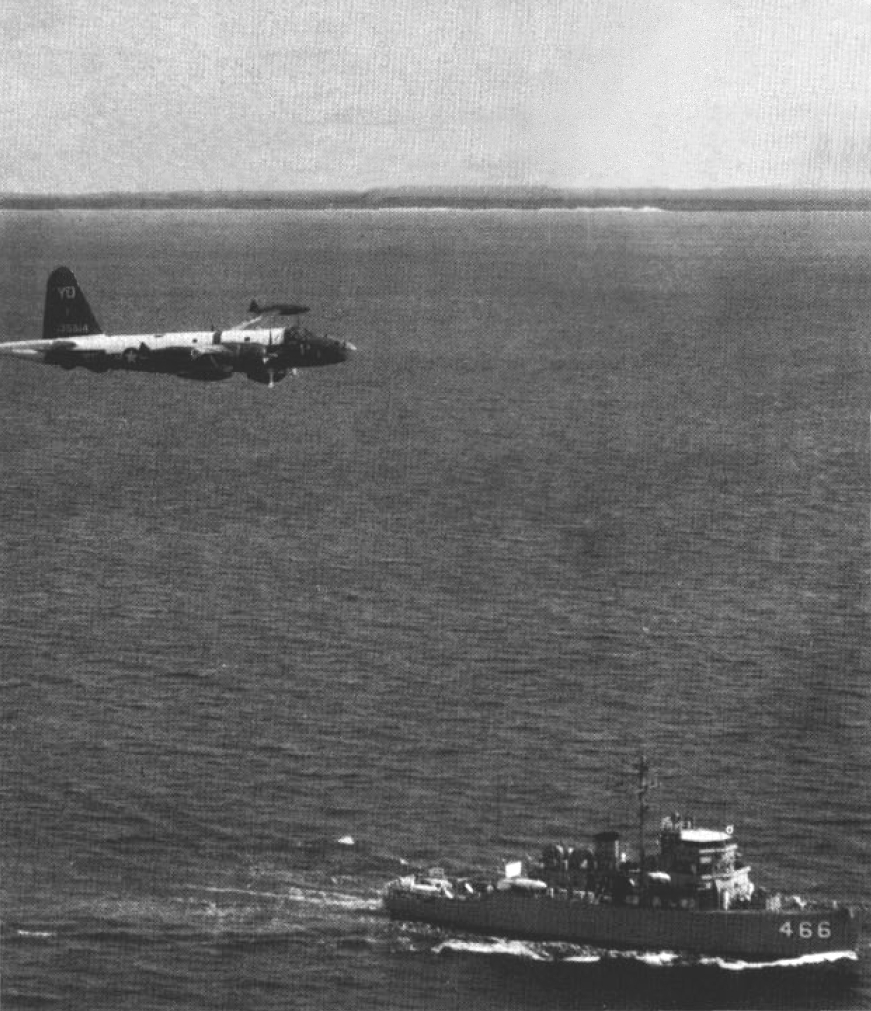
Prime and a SP-2H of VP-4 off Vietnam in 1965.

== Vietnam War operations ==
Deployed to WestPac on 15 January 1965, she patrolled the coast of South Vietnam intermittently from May to August 1965, boarding approximately four suspect vessels per week to prevent enemy infiltration and supply. In 1966 she deployed to WestPac on 21 September, arriving off South Vietnam on 11 November, and patrolling the coast until 31 December.

== Deactivation ==
Prime was struck from the Naval Vessel Register on 1 October 1976, and sold for scrapping on 7 January 1977 by the Defense Reutilization and Marketing Service to Edward Hixson, Los Alamitos, California, for $26,769.
