= USS Pluck =

USS Pluck is a name used more than once by the U.S. Navy:

- USS Pluck (AMc-94), a coastal minesweeper placed in service 6 October 1942.
- USS Pluck (MSO-464), a fleet minesweeper commissioned 11 August 1954.
