= Katharine Luomala =

American anthropologist (1907 – 1992)

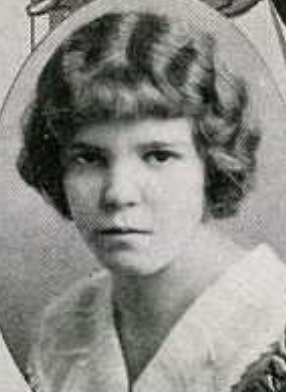
- Katharine Luomala from the 1925 yearbook of Cloquet High School
- Born: September 10, 1907; Cloquet, Minnesota, U.S.
- Died: February 27, 1992 (aged 84); Hawaii, U.S.
- Occupation: Anthropologist

Ellen Katharine Luomala (September 10, 1907 – February 27, 1992) was an American anthropologist known for her studies of comparative mythology in Oceania.

== Early life and education ==
Luomala was born in Cloquet, Minnesota, the daughter of John E. Luomala and Elina (Linn) Forsnäs Luomala. Both of her parents were born in Finland. She was educated at the University of California, Berkeley. She began her anthropological studies there by working with the Navajo people in the 1930s, chronicling their changing lives. She earned her bachelor's degree in 1931, a master's degree in 1933, and completed her Ph.D. in 1936.

== Career ==
In 1941 Luomala became an honorary associate at the Bishop Museum in Hawaii, which position she maintained for the rest of her working life. She worked in Washington, D.C. during World War II. In 1946 she became a professor of anthropology at the University of Hawaiʻi at Mānoa, where she studied Hawaiian mythology and, from 1950, the ethnobotany of the Gilbert Islands. In 1955 she received a Guggenheim Foundation fellowship for further studies in the Gilbert Islands. She retired in 1973.

Luomala was a fellow of the American Anthropological Association and a member of the Anthropological Society of Hawaii, the Polynesian Society, Phi Beta Kappa, and Sigma Xi. In 1983, she received the Hawaii Award for Literature, for her body of work.

Luomala owned the MV Joyita at the time of the vessel's accident in 1955.

Luomala's 1955 book, Voices on the Wind, was the book used as a reference by Imagineer Rolly Crump while he was designing Walt Disney's Enchanted Tiki Room and its pre-show. Crump also referred to the book as Whispers on the Wind. It is what served as a huge part in the popularity of American "Tiki culture."

== Works ==
Luomala was a prolific academic writer, with at least eight monographs and more than a hundred articles, in scholarly journals including The Psychoanalytic Quarterly, The Journal of the Polynesian Society, Human Organization, Applied Anthropology, Fabula, Pacific Science, The Journal of American Folklore, Ethnology, Asian Perspectives, Anthropos, and Pacific Studies. She also contributed to reference works, including the Standard Dictionary of Folklore, Mythology, and Legend (1950), edited by Maria Leach.

=== Monographs ===
- Navaho Life of Yesterday and Today (1940)
- Oceanic, American Indian, and African myths of snaring the sun (1940)
- Maui-of-a-Thousand-Tricks: His Oceanic and European Biographers (1949)
- The Menehune of Polynesia and other mythical little people of Oceania (1951)
- Plants of Canton Island, Phoenix Islands (Bernice P. Bishop Museum, 1951)
- Ethnobotany of the Gilbert Islands (1953)
- Voices on the Wind: Polynesian Myths and Chants (1955; illustrated by Joseph Feher)
- Hula Ki'i: Hawaiian Puppetry (1984)

=== Articles ===
- "Dreams and Dream Interpretation of the Diegueño Indians of Southern California" (1936, with Gertrude Toffelmier)
- "Notes on the Development of Polynesian Hero-Cycles" (1940)
- "Documentary Research in Polynesian Mythology" (1940)
- "California Takes Back its Japanese Evacuees: The Readjustment of California to the Return of the Japanese Evacuees" (1946)
- "Community Analysis of the War Relocation Authority Outside the Relocation Centers" (1947)
- "Polynesian Myths about Maui and the Dog" (1959)
- "A history of the binomial classification of the Polynesian native dog" (1960)
- "Survey of Research on Polynesian Prose and Poetry" (1961)
- "A Dynamic in Oceanic Maui Myths" (1961)
- "Martha Warren Beckwith: A Commemorative Essay" (1962)
- "Flexibility in Sib Affiliation among the Diegueno" (1963)
- "Motif A 728: Sun Caught in Snare and Certain Related Motifs" (1964)
- "Humorous Narratives about Individual Resistance to Food-Distribution Customs in Tabiteuea, Gilbert Islands" (1965)
- "Numskull Clans and Tales: Their Structure and Function in Asymmetrical Joking Relationships" (1966)
- "Disintegration and Regeneration, the Hawaiian Phantom Hitchhiker Legend" (1972)
- "Moving and Movable Images in Easter Island Custom and Myth" (1973)
- "The Cyrtosperma Systemic Pattern: Aspects of Production in the Gilbert Islands" (1974)
- "Post-European Central Polynesian Head Masks and Puppet-Marionette Heads" (1977)
- "Some Fishing Customs and Beliefs in Tabiteuea (Gilbert Islands, Micronesia)" (1980)
- "Phantom Night Marchers in the Hawaiian Islands" (1983)
- "Reality and Fantasy: The Foster Child in Hawaiian Myths and Customs" (1987)

== Personal life and legacy ==
Luomala died in 1992, at the age of 84. An anthropology scholarship fund in her name was set up at the University of Hawai'i at Mānoa.
