= USS Prestige (MSO-465) =

Minesweeper of the United States Navy

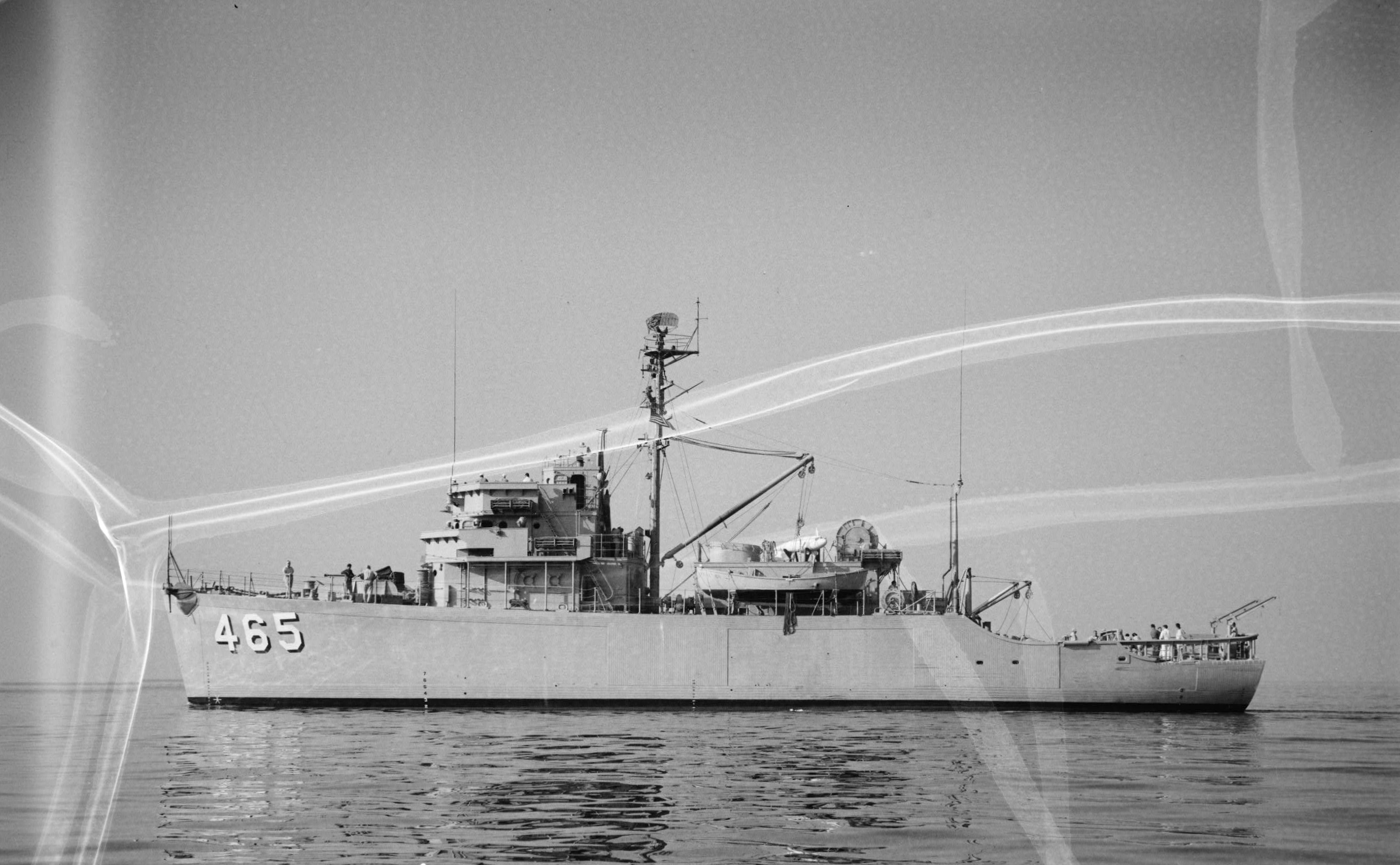
- USS Prestige (MSO-465) on 27 July 1954

History

United States
- Builder: Wilmington Boat Works
- Laid down: 15 April 1952
- Launched: 30 April 1954
- Commissioned: 11 September 1954
- Decommissioned: lost (ran aground)
- Stricken: date unknown
- Home port: Long Beach, California
- Fate: ran aground and lost, 23 August 1958

General characteristics
- Displacement: 630 tons
- Length: 172 ft (52 m)
- Beam: 36 ft (11 m)
- Draught: 10 ft (3.0 m)
- Speed: 15 knots
- Complement: 65
- Armament: one 40 mm mount

USS Prestige (AM-465/MSO-465) was an Agile-class minesweeper acquired by the U.S. Navy for the task of removing mines that had been placed in the water to prevent the safe passage of ships.

Prestige (AM–465) was laid down 15 April 1952 by Wilmington Boat Works, Wilmington, California; launched 30 April 1954; sponsored by Mrs. William R. Poulson; and commissioned 11 September 1954.

== Pacific Ocean deployments ==
After shakedown and reclassification to MSO–465 on 7 February 1955, Prestige participated in various exercises out of Long Beach, California, until she deployed 4 January 1956 to WestPac, proceeding via Pearl Harbor and Midway Island to serve with the U.S. 7th Fleet.

== Operations in the Atlantic and the Pacific ==
Her WestPac tour of 1956 included landing exercises at Iwo Jima in February and April. Following a visit to Yokosuka, Japan, she returned to Long Beach 15 June for local operations. Sailing for the Panama Canal 30 August 1957, she conducted operations on both the Atlantic and the Pacific sides of the Canal. Heading for Long Beach 23 November, she commenced overhaul upon arrival.

== Running aground in the Japanese Inland Sea ==
Deployed to WestPac in 1958, Prestige ran aground in Naruto Strait, Inland Sea, Japan, 23 August 1958. USS Pivot (MSO-463) came to her rescue, but ran aground herself. Pivot managed to free herself, but Prestige could not break free and was abandoned and declared a total loss.
