= MV Joyita =

American merchant vessel

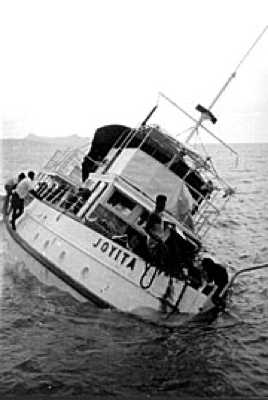
- MV Joyita partially submerged and listing heavily to port side

History

United States
- Name: Joyita
- Namesake: Jewel Carmen
- Owner: Roland West (1931–1936); Milton E. Beacon (1936–1941)
- Builder: Wilmington Boat Works
- Fate: Acquired by the United States Navy, October 1941

United States
- Name: YP-108
- Port of registry: (United States) Pearl Harbor, Hawaii
- Acquired: October 1941
- In service: 1941
- Out of service: 1948
- Fate: Sold to Louis Brothers, 1948
- Name: Joyita
- Owner: Louis Brothers (1948–1950); William Tavares (1950–1952); Dr Katharine Luomala (1952–1955); David Simpson (1956–1960s); Robin Maugham (1960s–1966); Major J. Casling-Cottle (1966–1970s)
- Fate: Broke up in Levuka in 1970s

General characteristics
- Type: Luxury yacht, yacht charter, merchant vessel
- Tonnage: 47 NRT; 70 GRT (approximate)
- Length: 69 ft (21 m)
- Beam: 17 ft (5.2 m)
- Draft: 7 ft 6 in (2.29 m)

MV Joyita was an American merchant vessel from which 25 passengers and crew mysteriously disappeared in the South Pacific in October 1955. She was found adrift with no one aboard.

The ship was in very poor condition, with corroded pipes and a radio which, while functional, had a range of only about 2 miles (3.2 km) because of faulty wiring. However, the extreme buoyancy of the ship made sinking nearly impossible. Investigators were puzzled as to why the crew had not remained on board and waited for help.

== Vessel description and history ==
=== Construction ===
MV Joyita was a 69-foot (21.0 m) wooden ship built in 1931 as a luxury yacht by the Wilmington Boat Works in Los Angeles for movie director Roland West, who named the ship for his wife, actress Jewel Carmen — joyita in Spanish meaning "little jewel". In 1936 the ship was sold and registered to Milton E. Beacon. During this period, she made numerous trips south to Mexico and to the 1939–1940 Golden Gate International Exposition in San Francisco. During part of this time, Chester Mills was the captain of the vessel.

The ship's hull was constructed of 2-inch (51 mm)-thick cedar on oak frames. She was 69 feet 0 inches (21.0 m) long, with beam of 17 feet 0 inches (5.2 m) and a draft of 7 feet 6 inches (2.3 m); her net tonnage was 47 tons and her gross tonnage approximately 70 tons. She had tanks for 2,500 U.S. gallons (9,500 L) of water and 3,000 U.S. gallons (11,400 L) of diesel fuel.

=== U.S. Navy service in World War II ===
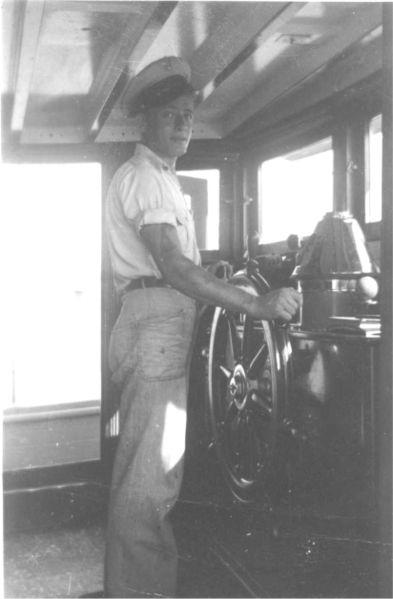
Ship's wheelhouse in 1942

In October 1941, two months before the attack on Pearl Harbor, Joyita was acquired by the United States Navy and taken to Pearl Harbor, Hawaii, where she was outfitted as yard patrol boat YP-108. The Navy used her to patrol the Big Island of Hawaii until the end of World War II.

In 1943, she ran aground and was heavily damaged. However, the Navy was badly in need of ships; as such, Joyita was repaired. At this point, new pipework was made from galvanized iron instead of copper or brass. In 1946, the ship was surplus to Navy requirements and most of her equipment was removed.

=== Private purchase ===
In 1948, Joyita was sold to the firm of Louis Brothers. At this point, cork lining was added to the ship's hull along with refrigeration equipment. The ship had two Gray Marine diesel engines providing 225 horsepower (168 kW), and two extra diesel engines for generators. In 1950 William Tavares became the owner; however, he had little use for the vessel, and sold it in 1952 to Dr. Katharine Luomala, a professor at the University of Hawaiʻi. She chartered the boat to her friend, Captain Thomas H. "Dusty" Miller, a British-born sailor living in Samoa. Miller used the ship as a trading and fishing charter boat.

== Disappearance ==
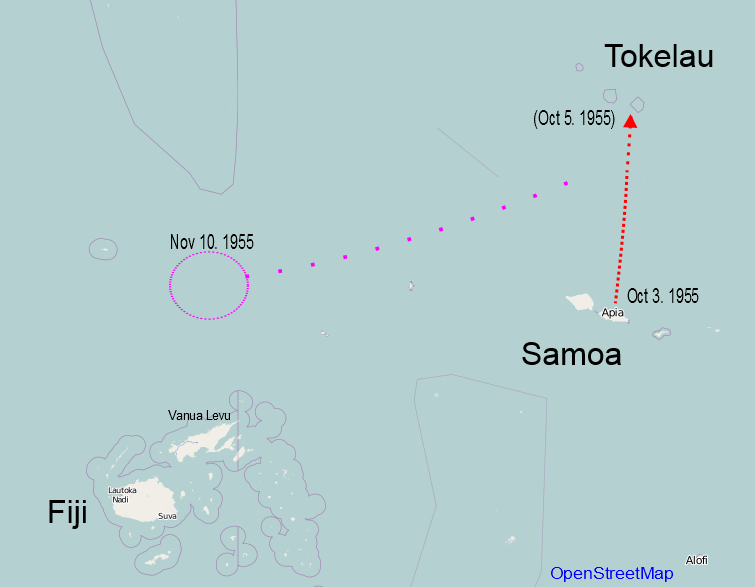
Planned route (red line) and where Joyita was found (purple circle)

About 5:00 AM on 3 October 1955, Joyita left Samoa's Apia harbour bound for the Tokelau Islands, about 270 miles (430 km) away. The boat had been scheduled to leave on the noon tide the previous day but her departure was delayed because her port engine clutch failed. Joyita eventually left Samoa on one engine. She was carrying sixteen crew members and nine passengers, including a government official, a doctor (Alfred "Andy" Denis Parsons, a World War II surgeon on his way to perform an amputation), a copra buyer, and two children. Her cargo consisted of medical supplies, timber, 80 empty 45-gallon (200 L) oil drums, and various foodstuffs.

The voyage was expected to take between 41 and 48 hours. Joyita was scheduled to arrive in the Tokelau Islands on 5 October. On 6 October, a message from Fakaofo port reported that the ship was overdue. No ship or land-based operator reported receiving a distress signal from the crew. A search-and-rescue mission was launched and, from 6 to 12 October, Sunderlands of the Royal New Zealand Air Force covered a probability area of nearly 100,000 square miles (260,000 km^{2}) of ocean, but no sign of Joyita or any of her passengers or crew was found.

Five weeks later, on 10 November, Gerald Douglas, captain of the merchant ship Tuvalu, en route from Suva to Funafuti, sighted Joyita more than 600 miles (970 km) west from her scheduled route, drifting north of Vanua Levu. The ship was partially submerged and listing heavily (her port deck rail was awash) and there was no trace of any of the passengers or crew; four tons of cargo were also missing. The recovery party noted that the radio was discovered tuned to 2182 kHz, the international marine radiotelephone distress channel.

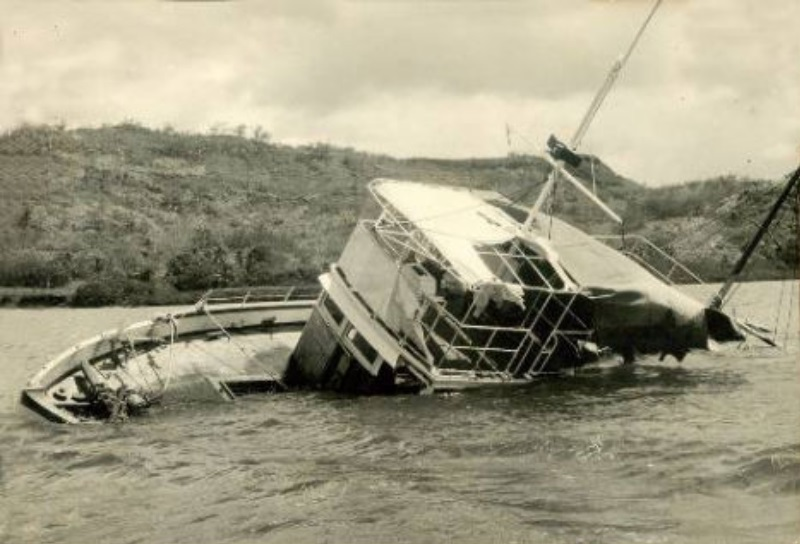
Wreck seen from port side

- Barnacle growth high above the usual waterline on the port side showed that Joyita had been listing heavily for some time.
- There was some damage to the superstructure. Her flying bridge had been smashed away and the deckhouse had light damage and broken windows. A canvas awning had been rigged on top of the deckhouse behind the bridge.
- Joyita carried a dinghy and three Carley liferafts, but all were missing. She did not carry enough lifejackets for everyone on board.
- The starboard engine was found to be covered by mattresses, while the port engine's clutch was still partially disassembled, showing that the vessel was still running on only one engine. The starter motor of the starboard auxiliary engine was also missing, indicating that this engine was unserviceable.
- An auxiliary pump had been rigged in the engine room, mounted on a plank of wood slung between the main engines. However, it had not been connected.
- The radio on board was tuned to the international distress channel. However, when the equipment was inspected, a break was found in the cable between the set and the aerial. The cable had been painted over, obscuring the break. This would have limited the range of the radio to about 2 miles (3.2 km).
- The electric clocks on board (wired into the vessel's generator) had stopped at 10:25 and the switches for the cabin lighting and navigation lights were on, implying that whatever had occurred happened at night.
- The ships' logbook, sextant, mechanical chronometer and other navigational equipment, as well as the firearms Miller kept in the boat, were missing.
- A doctor's bag was found on deck, containing a stethoscope, a scalpel, and four lengths of blood-stained bandages.

There was still fuel in Joyita's tanks; from the amount used, it was calculated she made some 243 miles (391 km) before the vessel was abandoned, probably within 50 miles (80 km) of Tokelau. The leak had probably started after 9 p.m. on the second night of the voyage, with nine hours of darkness ahead.

Although Joyita was found with her bilges and lower decks flooded, her hull was sound and once the water was pumped from her hull she floated on a stable and even keel and was easily towed into harbour at Suva. When at her mooring there, investigators heard the sound of water entering the vessel. It was found that a pipe in the raw-water circuit of the port auxiliary engine's cooling system had failed due to galvanic corrosion, allowing water into the bilges. The first the crew would have known about the leak was when the water rose above the engine room floorboards, by which time it would have been nearly impossible to locate the leak. Also, the bilge pumps were not fitted with strainers, and had become clogged with debris, meaning that it would have been very difficult to pump the water out.

== Maritime inquiry ==
A formal inquiry into the fate of Joyita was held in Apia in February 1956. It found that the vessel was in a poor state of repair, but determined that the fate of the passengers and crew was "inexplicable on the evidence submitted at the inquiry." An especially perplexing point was that the three liferafts Joyita carried were missing, but it would not make sense for the crew and passengers to voluntarily abandon the vessel. Fitted out for carrying refrigerated cargo, Joyita had 640 cubic feet (18 m^{3}) of cork lining her holds, making her virtually unsinkable. In addition, further buoyancy was provided by a cargo of empty fuel drums.

The inquiry was able to establish only the reasons for the vessel becoming flooded. It found that the vessel would have begun to flood due to the fractured cooling pipe. The bilge pumps were unserviceable due to becoming blocked. Joyita lacked watertight bulkheads or subdivisions in the bilges. The water would have gradually flooded the lower decks. As the boat began to sink lower into the water, the one remaining engine would not have been able to maintain enough speed to steer. Joyita then fell beam-on to a heavy swell and took on the heavy list it was found with. While flooded to an extent which would sink a conventional vessel, Joyita stayed afloat due to her cork-lined hull and cargo of fuel drums.

The inquiry also placed much of the responsibility for the events on Captain Miller. They found him reckless for setting out on an ocean-going voyage with only one engine and numerous minor faults, and negligent for failing to provide a working radio or properly equipped lifeboat. He was also in breach of maritime law, since he had allowed Joyita's license to carry fare-paying passengers to lapse.

The inquiry made no mention of the used medical equipment found on board.

== Hypotheses ==
Joyita is sometimes referred to as the "Mary Celeste of the South Pacific" and has been the subject of several books and documentaries offering explanations that range from rational and conventional to supernatural and paranormal. Numerous hypotheses for the disappearance of Joyita's crew and passengers have been advanced. Many were circulated at the time of the event, and several others have been put forward since. Given the fact that the hull of Joyita was sound and her design made her almost unsinkable, a main concern of investigators was determining why the passengers and crew did not stay on board if the events were simply triggered by the flooding in the engine room.

=== Injured captain hypothesis ===
Captain Miller should have been well aware of the vessel's ability to stay afloat, leading some to speculate that he had died or become incapacitated for some reason (someone on board was injured—hence the bloodstained bandages). Without him to reassure the other people on board, they may have panicked when Joyita began to flood and taken to the liferafts. However, this in itself would not account for the missing cargo and equipment, unless the vessel had been found abandoned and had her cargo removed.

A friend of Miller, Captain S. B. Brown, was convinced that Miller would never have left Joyita alive, given his knowledge of her construction. He was aware of tension between Miller and his American first mate, Chuck Simpson, and felt that their mutual dislike came to blows and both men fell overboard or were severely injured in a struggle. This left the vessel without an experienced seaman and would explain why those remaining on board would panic when the ship began to flood.

=== Japanese involvement and other hypotheses ===
Newspaper headline accusing Japan

The Fiji Times and Herald quoted at the time from an "impeccable source" to the effect that Joyita had passed through a fleet of Japanese fishing boats during its trip and "had observed something the Japanese did not want them to see."

The Daily Telegraph in London hypothesized that some still-active Japanese forces from World War II were to blame for the disappearances, operating from an isolated island base. There was still strong anti-Japanese sentiment in parts of the Pacific, and in Fiji there was specific resentment of Japan being allowed to operate fishing fleets in local waters.

Such theories suddenly gained credence when men clearing Joyita found knives stamped 'Made in Japan'. However, tests on the knives proved negative and it turned out the knives were old and broken - quite possibly left on board from when Joyita was used for fishing in the late 1940s.

Also there was a proposition that "the vessel's occupants were kidnapped by a Soviet submarine, with the world at the time in the midst of the growing Cold War."

Early reports that the Joyita had been involved in a collision led to speculation that she had been rammed, and that modern sea pirates attacked the vessel, killed the 25 passengers and crew (and cast their bodies into the ocean), and stole the missing four tons of cargo.

=== Insurance fraud hypothesis ===
It was also revealed that Miller had amassed large debts after a series of unsuccessful fishing trips on Joyita. However, it would have been difficult to see the events surrounding Joyita as insurance fraud, given that no seacocks were found open and the ship would be almost impossible to scuttle. Also, Miller was relying on Joyita being chartered for regular runs between Samoa and Tokelau—these government charters would have quickly cleared his debts.

=== Mutiny hypothesis ===
A subsequent owner of Joyita, British author Robin Maugham, spent many years investigating the vessel's past, and published his findings as The Joyita Mystery in 1962. Maugham agreed that events were started by the flooding from the broken cooling pipe and the failure of the pumps. The mattresses found covering the starboard engine were used either in an attempt to stem the leak or to protect the electrical switchboard from spray kicked up by the engine's flywheel as the water level rose. At the same time, Joyita encountered increasingly heavy swells and squally weather.

Captain Miller, knowing Joyita to be unsinkable and desperate to reach his destination to clear his debt, pressed on. However, Simpson, and possibly other crew members, demanded that he turn back. This effectively led to mutiny and Miller and the crew struggled, during which Miller sustained a serious injury. By now the ship was entering heavier weather, with winds around 40 miles per hour (64 km/h), and with one engine and a flooded bilge, was beginning to labor. The flooding in the engine room would have eventually caused the starboard engine to fail, also cutting all the vessel's electrical power. Simpson was now in control and made the decision to abandon ship, taking the navigational equipment, logbook and supplies, as well as the injured Miller, with them.

It still seems unlikely that Simpson would choose to abandon a flooded but floating ship to take to small open rafts in the Pacific Ocean. Maugham proposed that they sighted a nearby island or reef and tried to reach it, but in the strong winds and seas the rafts were carried out to sea, leaving Joyita drifting and empty. The damage to the lightly-built superstructure was caused by wave damage while the vessel was drifting in heavy seas.

== Joyita after 1955 ==
In July 1956, Joyita was auctioned off by her owners for £2,425 to a Fiji Islander, David Simpson (no relation to Chuck Simpson). He refitted and overhauled her and she went to sea again that year. However, she was surrounded by legal disputes over the transfer of her registry from the United States to Britain without permission. In January 1957 she ran aground while carrying thirteen passengers in the Koro Sea. She was repaired and in October 1958 began a regular trade between Levuka and Suva.

Joyita again ran aground on a reef in November 1959 at Vatuvalu near Levuka. She floated off the reef assisted by high tide, but while heading for port began to take in water through a split seam. The pumps were started, but it became clear that the valves for the pump had been installed the wrong way round, meaning that water was pumped into the hull, not out. Now with a reputation as an 'unlucky ship' and with a damaged hull, she was abandoned by her owners and beached. She was stripped of useful equipment and was practically a hulk when she was bought by Maugham. He sold the hulk in 1966 to Major J. Casling-Cottle, who ran a tourist and publicity bureau at Levuka. The Major planned to turn it into a museum and tearoom, but the plan never saw daylight. The hulk disappeared piece by piece and the process of disintegration appears to have been complete by the late 1970s.

On 14 March 1975, the Western Samoa Post Office released a set of five stamps dealing with the mystery of Joyita.

In 2009, a walkway was named after Dr Alfred Dennis Parsons near his former Torbay home in Auckland, New Zealand. In 2012, two memory stones in honor of the event were erected in Apia, Samoa and in Fakaofo Village, Tokelau.

== Crew and passengers ==
As of 2012, all aboard were still declared as "missing". In 2012 there was a call by the organiser of a commemoration ceremony for a formal declaration that they were dead.

Crew (16)
Name	Rank	Age	Country
MILLER Thomas Henry (Dusty)	Captain	41	Britain
SIMPSON Charles R. (Chuck)	Mate	28	United States
TEEWEKA Tekokaa (Tekolo)	Bosun	25	Kiribati
TANINI Aberaam Tanini	Engineer	24	Kiribati
McCARTHY Henry Jr.	Engineer	27	Samoa
PEDRO Penaia Kolio	Seaman	22	Tokelau
FARAIMO Ihaia Kitiona	Seaman	24	Tokelau
LEPAIO Tagifano Latafoti	Seaman	27	Tokelau (Atafu)
HIMONA Haipele Fihaga	Seaman	28	Tokelau (Atafu)
APETE Ioakimi Iapeha	Seaman	23	Tokelau (Fakaofo)
MOHE Himeti Falaniko	Seaman	31	Tokelau (Fakaofo)
ELEKANA Tuhaga Hila	Greaser	26	Tokelau (Fakaofo)
KOLO Leota Telepu	Greaser	24	Tokelau (Atafu)
PELETI Mohe Maota	Cook	24	Tokelau (Fakaofo)
WALLWORK James William	Supercargo	44	Western Samoa
WILLIAMS George Kendall	Supercargo	66	New Zealand

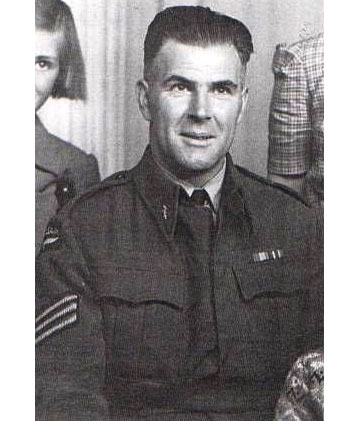
Pharmacist Bert Hodgkinson, New Zealand

Passengers
Name	Occupation	Age	Country	Notes
FAIVA Liua Noama Rosaiti		3		The adopted daughter of Tokelau Lapana
HODGKINSON Herbert T. (Bert)	Dispenser	49	New Zealand	From Apia hospital
LAPANA Takama	Dispenser	51		From Fakaofo hospital
LAPANA Tokelau		40	(Fakaofo) Tekai	Wife of Takama
PARSONS Alfred Dennis (Andy)	Physician	41	Ireland	From Apia hospital (Note: "Alfred Denis Parsons - Date of Death 03/10/1955, Granted on 19/06/1961 - State Records NSW". nsw.gov.au. Archived from the original on 30 October 2014. Archive.org)
PEARLESS Roger Derrick (Pete)	District Officer	30	New Zealand	
PEREIRA Joseph Hipili	Radio Operator	22	Tokelau (Fakaofo)	
TALAMA Founuku Uluola		11		The adopted son of Tokelau Lapana
TEOFILO Tomoniko		30	Tokelau (Fakaofo)	

== See also ==
- List of people who disappeared mysteriously at sea
