= USS Reaper (MSO-467) =

Minesweeper of the United States Navy

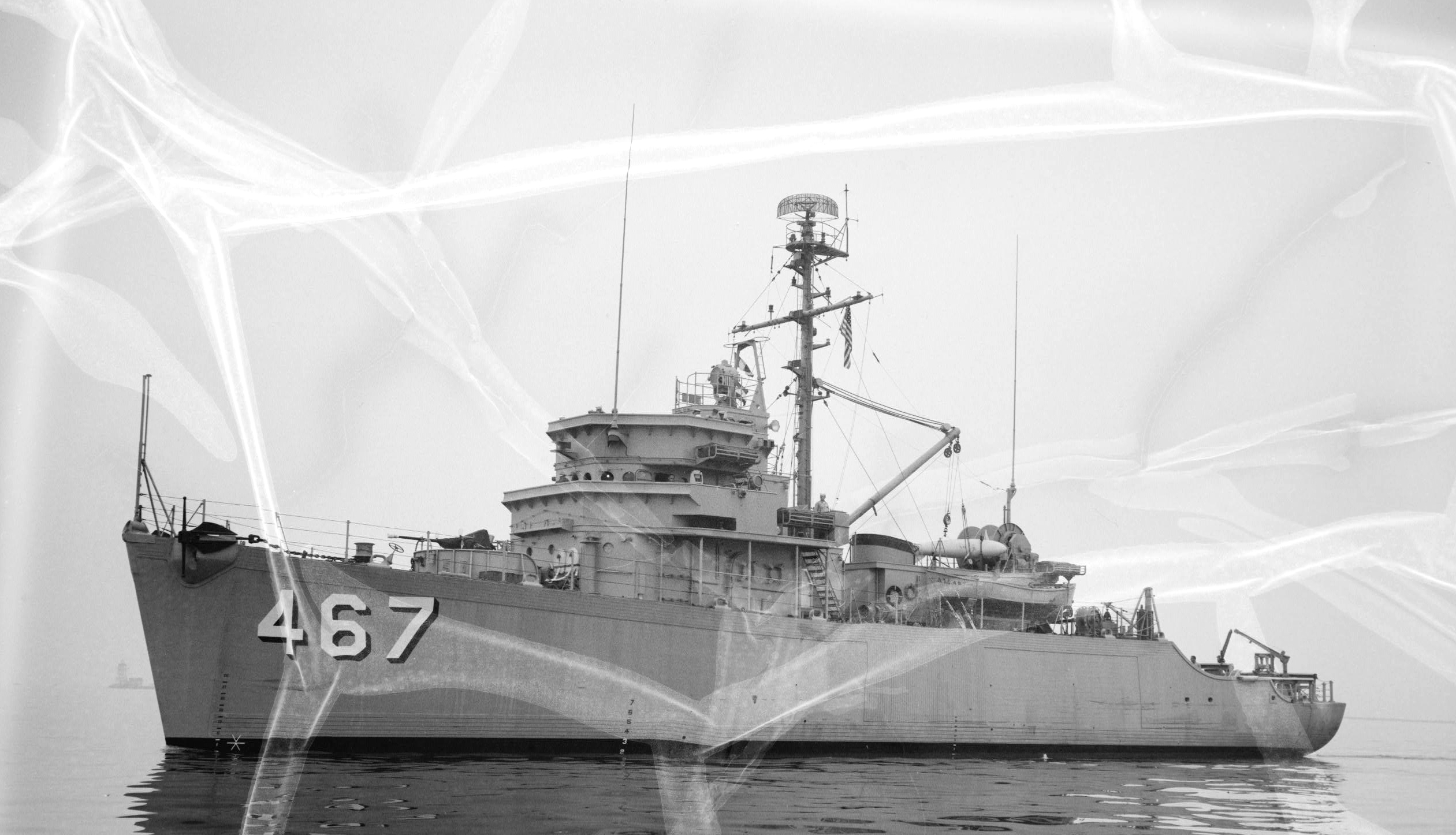

History

United States
- Builder: Wilmington Boat Works
- Laid down: 15 May 1952
- Launched: 25 June 1954
- Commissioned: 10 November 1954
- Decommissioned: 22 September 1972
- Stricken: 28 February 1975
- Home port: Long Beach, California
- Fate: disposed of by Navy sale 1 November 1976

General characteristics
- Displacement: 775 tons (full load)
- Length: 172 ft (52 m)
- Beam: 36 ft (11 m)
- Draught: 10 ft (3.0 m)
- Speed: 15 knots
- Complement: 74
- Armament: one 40 mm mount

USS Reaper (MSO-467) was an Agile-class minesweeper acquired by the U.S. Navy for the task of removing mines that had been placed in the water to prevent the safe passage of ships.

The second ship to be named Reaper by the Navy, MSO-467 was laid down 15 May 1952 by Wilmington Boat Works, Wilmington, California; launched 25 June 1954; sponsored by Mrs. John A. Snackenherg; and commissioned 10 November 1954.

== WestPac operations ==
After shakedown, Reaper sailed for the western Pacific Ocean 1 May 1956. Departing Sasebo, Japan, she participated in training exercises at Taiwan with the Republic of China, and helped to search for a P4M aircraft shot down by Communist China.

Arriving at Long Beach, California, 15 November, she trained off California in 1957 and early 1958. Deployed to the western Pacific 3 November 1958, she visited Sasebo, Japan; Kaohsiung, Taiwan; Chinhae, Korea; Sattahip, Thailand; Subic Bay, Philippines; and Buckner Bay, Okinawa, before arriving at Long Beach 31 May 1959.

== Joint exercises with various nations ==
During an amphibious exercise in November 1959, she operated out of Kodiak, Alaska, with Canadian minesweepers. After training in 1960, she deployed to the western Pacific 4 January 1961, and participated in separate exercises with the Philippine Navy, and the Nationalist Chinese Navy, before arriving via Japan at Long Beach 17 July. Departing Long Beach 16 November 1962 for western Pacific deployment, she joined exercise in the Philippines and Taiwan, including a SEATO exercise off Manila Bay, Luzon, before returning to Long Beach 22 June 1963.

== Supporting Vietnam operations ==
After exercises off California, she remained active with the U.S. Pacific Fleet in 1964 and 1965. Sailing for the western Pacific 21 September 1966, she participated in "Operation Market Time" patrol duty off Vietnam during November and December, and in February and March 1967, before reaching Long Beach 27 July. Deployed to the western Pacific again in April 1968, she patrolled off Vietnam and visited Chinhae, Korea; and Sattahip, Thailand, arriving Long Beach 3 December. Reaper deployed for the final time to the Western Pacific in the fall of 1969; Lt Cmdr Robert Kahler commanding. In early 1970, she came under mortar fire when anchored near Vung Tau, Vietnam. In February, Reaper provided covering fire for her boarding team sent to check out a grounded and abandoned small coastal freighter. The boarding team had come under heavy fire from opposing forces ashore. This deployment also saw the untimely death, as the result of a non-combat ship-board accident, of SF2 Lester Riley Jr. Reaper remained active with the U.S. Seventh Fleet until 2 May 1970 when she returned to the U.S. West Coast.

== Training ship assignment ==
Upon her return, she was assigned duty as a U.S. Naval Reserve training ship and remained so engaged until being decommissioned 22 September 1972.

== Decommissioning ==
After decommissioning she was transferred to the Ships Inactivation and Maintenance Facility at Vallejo, California. Reaper was stricken from the Navy list 28 February 1975 and disposed of by Navy sale 1 November 1976.
