= USS Pivot (MSO-463) =

Minesweeper of the United States Navy

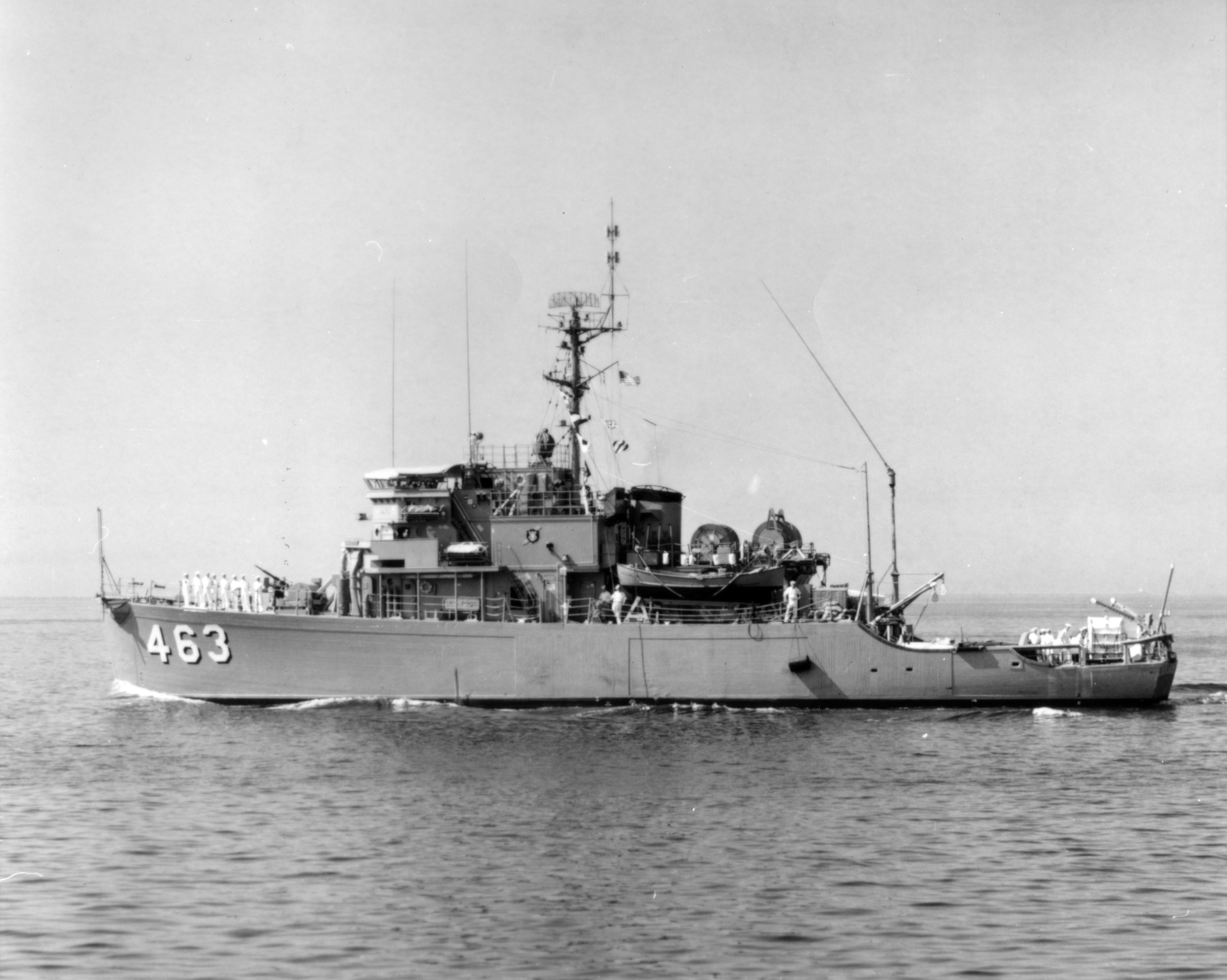
- USS Pivot (MSO-463) on 9 September 1968

History

United States
- Name: USS Pivot (AM-463)
- Builder: Wilmington Boat Works
- Laid down: 31 March 1952
- Launched: 9 January 1954
- Commissioned: 12 July 1954
- Reclassified: MSO-463, February 1956
- Decommissioned: 1 July 1971
- Stricken: 1 August 1974
- Home port: Long Beach, California
- Fate: Sold to Spain, 1 August 1974

History

Spain
- Name: Guadalmedina (M42)
- Acquired: 1 August 1974
- Decommissioned: 18 January 2001
- Fate: Unknown
- Status: Decommissioned

General characteristics
- Class & type: Aggressive-class minesweeper
- Displacement: 775 tons
- Length: 172 ft (52 m)
- Beam: 36 ft (11 m)
- Draught: 10 ft (3.0 m)
- Speed: 15 knots
- Complement: 65
- Armament: one 40 mm mount

USS Pivot (AM-463/MSO-463) was an Aggressive-class minesweeper acquired by the U.S. Navy for the task of removing mines that had been placed in the water to prevent the safe passage of ships.

The second ship to be named Pivot by the Navy, AM–463 was laid down 31 March 1952 by Wilmington Boat Works, Wilmington, California; launched 9 January 1954; sponsored by Mrs. Minor C. Heinl; and commissioned 12 July 1954.

== West Coast operations ==
Following shakedown in the Long Beach-San Diego area, Pivot became flagship of Mine Division 93 at its establishment 6 December. On 8 January 1955, she participated in Operation Rainbow to begin her career in the U.S. Pacific Fleet and the following month was redesignated MSO–463.

== WestPac deployments ==
She operated along the U.S. West Coast until departing Long Beach, California, 2 June 1958 for the Far East for service with the U.S. 7th Fleet. During this deployment she attempted to assist USS Prestige (MSO-465) aground at Naruto Kaikyo, Japan; but ran aground herself during the daring operation in dangerous waters. Pivot managed to break free but Prestige was lost.

== Awarded the Battle Efficiency “E” ==
Returning to Long Beach 7 January 1959, the non-magnetic ocean minesweeper resumed operations along the U.S. West Coast establishing a pattern of alternating service off the Pacific seaboard with WestPac deployments in 1960, 1962, 1964, 1966 and 1968. During the 1962 deployment, she received the Battle Efficiency “E”.

== Supporting Market Time operations ==
Her last three deployments took Pivot to Viet Nam for “Market Time” operations, inspecting junks and other craft to stem the flow of Communist war material from the north into South Viet Nam. Her light draft, and her crew's high standard of seamanship suited the minesweeper ideally for this important service in support of freedom.

Pivot's last WESTPAC deployment, during which she served in Operation Market Time, first at the mouth of the Mekong River and then along the DMZ, was from February to September, 1970. Pivot was decommissioned on 1 July 1971. Stricken from the Navy list 1 August 1974. She was sold to Spain effective the same day. Pivot was named Guadamedina (M42) in the Spanish Navy.

== Decommissioning ==
Pivot was decommissioned on 1 July 1971. Stricken from the Navy list 1 August 1974 she was sold to Spain effective the same day. Pivot was named Guadamedina (M42) in the Spanish Navy.
