= Wilmington Boat Works =

Shipyard in Wilmington, California, United States

Coordinates: 33.765481°N 118.255921°W

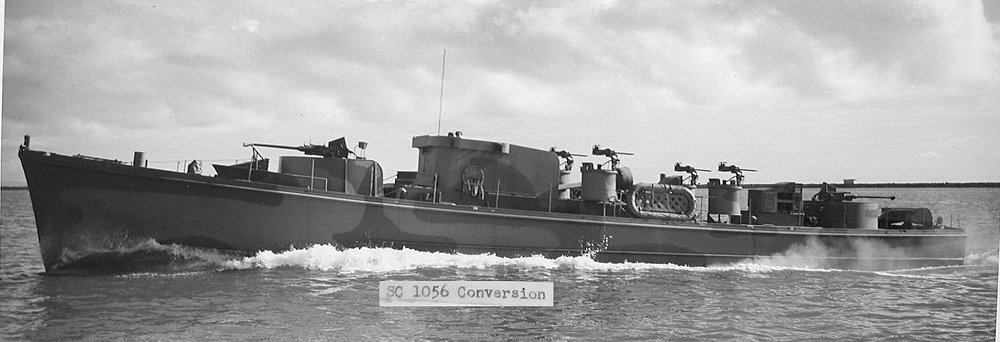
US Navy, 110-foot (34 m) submarine chaser USS PGM-5 after her conversion to a motor gunboat in July 1943.

Wilmington Boat Works, Inc. or WILBO was a shipbuilding company in Wilmington, California. To support the World War 2 demand for ships Victory Shipbuilding built: Tugboats, crash rescue boats and sub chasers. Wilmington Boat Works opened in 1920 building Fishing boat and yachts, by Hugh Angelman, Willard Buchanan and Tom Smith. After the Korean War the shipyard closed in 1958. The shipyard was located at 400 Yacht Street, Wilmington, the site of the current USC boatyard.

== Tugboats ==
Wilmington Boat Works built tugboats for the US Army in 1943 and 1944. The small tugs had a length of 63 feet (19 m), a depth of 8.3 feet (2.5 m), a beam of 17.8 feet (5.4 m), a 56 gross register tons (GRT), and a 23 net register tons (NRT). They were wooden-hulled and diesel-powered. After the war they were sold for commercial use. The tugs were numbered TP 126 to TP 131, TP for "Tug/Passenger".

== Submarine chaser ==
Wilmington Boat Works Company built two submarine chasers for the United States Navy that were of the SC-497-class submarine chaser design with a displacement of 94 tons, a length of 110 feet (34 m), a beam of 17 feet (5.2 m), a draft of 6 feet (1.8 m), and a top speed of 21 knots (39 km/h; 24 mph). They had a crew of 28. Power was provided by two 1,540-brake-horsepower (1,150 kW) General Motors, Electro-Motive Division, 16-184A diesel engines, and two propellers. They were armed with one Bofors 40 mm gun, two Browning M2 .50 cal. machine gun, two depth charge projector "Y guns", and two depth charge tracks. Some of the submarine chasers were lent to Allies of the United States as part of the Lend-Lease program.

The submarine chasers were converted to PGM-1-class motor gunboats six months after completion in 1943.

- USS PGM-5
- USS PGM-8

== Crash boats ==
For the US Army built 85 foot Crash boats

Ship ID	Name	Built	Notes
251870	P 518	Jun-44	Later renamed Flying Shark
256911	P 519	Jun-44	Later renamed Viking, Alaskan Song
252576	P 520	Jul-44	Later renamed Brigand
	P 521	Jul-44	
252762	P 522	Aug-44	Later renamed Vanities, Thunder Cloud, Dry Martini
255689	P 523	Aug-44	Later renamed Thunderbird
252985	P 524	Sep-44	Later renamed Thunderer
	P 525	Sep-44	

== Agile-class minesweeper ==
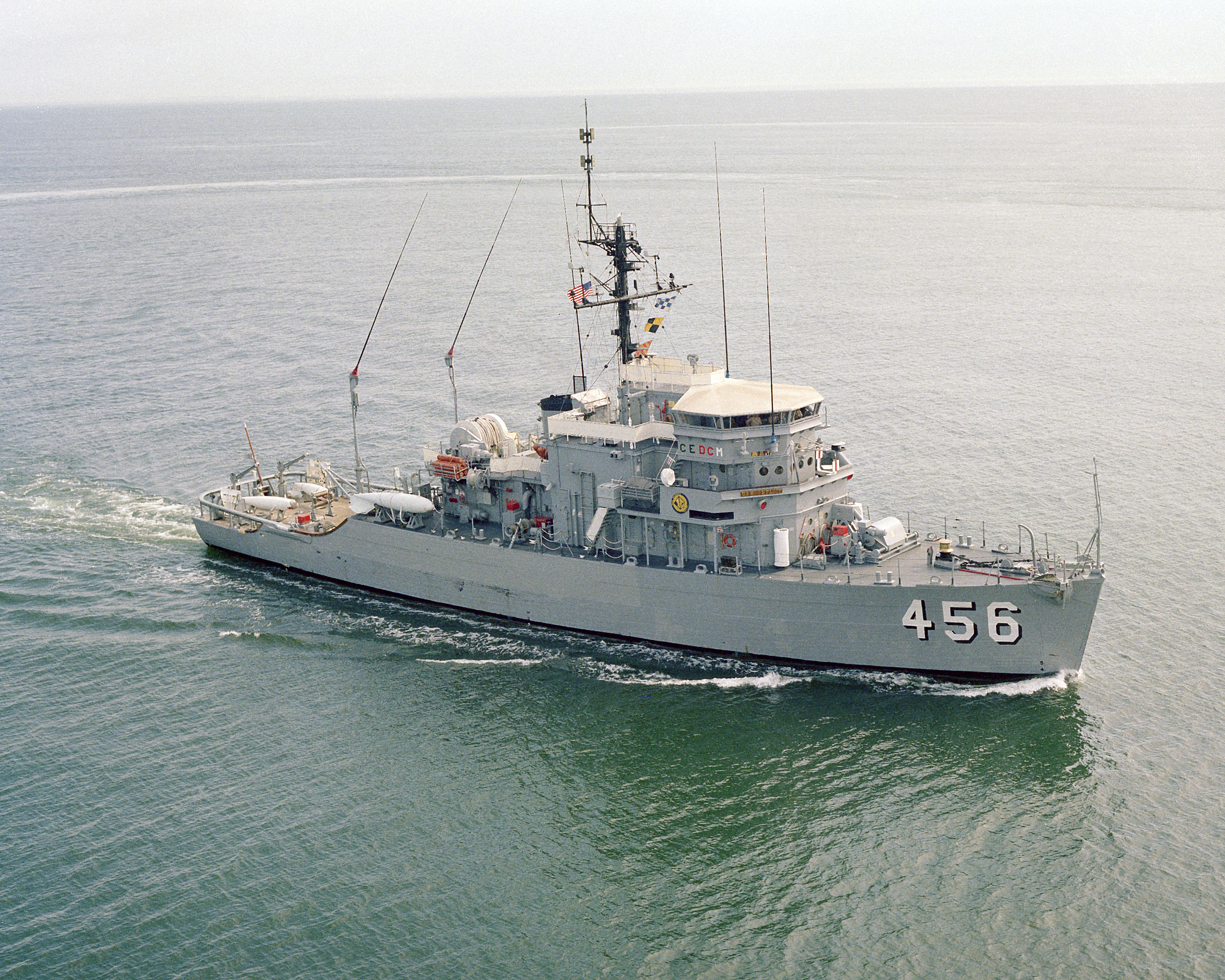
USS Inflict built by Wilmington Boat Works

Wilmington Boat Works in 1954 built Agile-class minesweepers for the United States Navy with a displacement of 853 tons full, a length of 172 ft (52 m), a beam of 35 ft (11 m), a draft of 10 ft (3.0 m). They were powered by four Packard ID1700 diesel engines, with 2,280 bhp (1,700 kW) and two controllable pitch propellers. The ships had a top speed of 14 knots (26 km/h; 16 mph). The ship crew was 7 officers and 70 enlisted men. They were armed with one Bofors 40 mm gun and two .50 cal (12.7 mm) twin machine gun. Notable ships include USS Conflict and USS Constant.

- USS Implicit (AM-455)
- USS Prime (AM-466)
- USS Reaper (MSO-467)
- USS Pluck (MSO-464)
- USS Prestige (MSO-465)
- USS Pivot (MSO-463)
- USS Inflict (AM-456)
- USS Loyalty (AM-457)

== Notable boats ==
- The Sobre Las Olas, a 105-foot (32 m) yacht built in 1929 was used by the US Navy in 1941 as YP-131. In 1945 it was sold to J. Paul Getty. Getty sold the boat in 1932. She has a beam of 23 feet (7.0 m) and a draft of 8 feet (2.4 m). Sobre Las Olas was the setting of the 1957 movie Pal Joey with Frank Sinatra and Rita Hayworth. The vessel was also used in the 2012 movie Liz & Dick with Lindsay Lohan playing Elizabeth Taylor.
- Chubasco is a 46-foot (14 m) sailboat built in 1939, that won the 2016 Show Awards for Best of Show at the Marina in Newport.

== Notable incident ==
- MV Joyita a 69-foot (21.0 m) wooden luxury yacht built in 1931 was found wrecked off Vanua Levu and 25 passengers and crew mysteriously disappeared in October 1955. Life rafts were missing, but no one was found. She was repaired and sold.

== See also ==
- California during World War II
- Maritime history of California
