= Adjutant-class minesweeper =

United States-built auxiliary motor minesweepers

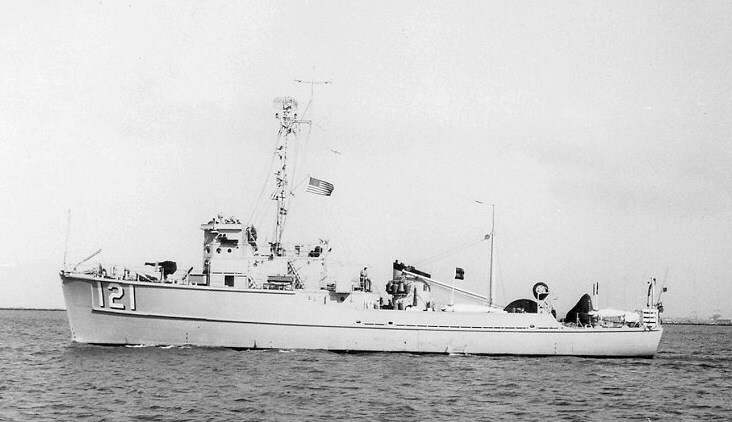
- Broadside view of Bluebird off south end of Mare Island on 29 September 1953.

Class overview
- Name: Adjutant class
- Builders: Various builders
- Operators: United States Navy; Belgian Navy; Royal Danish Navy; Republic of Fiji Navy; French Navy; Hellenic Navy; Indonesian Navy; Islamic Republic of Iran Navy; Italian Navy; Republic of Korea Navy; Japan Maritime Self-Defense Force; Royal Moroccan Navy; Royal Netherlands Navy; Royal Norwegian Navy; Pakistan Navy; Philippine Navy; Portuguese Navy; Royal Saudi Navy; Spanish Navy; Republic of Singapore Navy; Royal Thai Navy; Turkish Navy; Republic of China Navy; National Navy of Uruguay; Republic of Vietnam Navy
- Preceded by: YMS-1 class
- Succeeded by: Avenger class
- Subclasses: Bluebird class; Redwing class; Falcon class; MSC-218 class; MSC-268 class; MSC-292 class; MSC-294 class; Albatross class
- Built: 1952–1978
- In service: 1953–present
- Planned: 214
- Completed: 202
- Canceled: 12
- Lost: 4
- Preserved: 2

General characteristics
- Type: Minesweeper
- Displacement: 330 long tons (340 t) light; 390 long tons (400 t) full load
- Length: 138 ft (42 m) p/p; 144 ft (44 m) o/a
- Beam: 27 ft (8.2 m)
- Draft: 9 ft (2.7 m)
- Installed power: 4 × Packard 300 hp (220 kW) diesel engines or, 2 × General Motors 440 hp (330 kW) 8-268A diesel engines or, 2 × MAN 625 hp (466 kW) V6V 22/30 diesel engines or, 4 × General Motors 238 hp (177 kW) 6-71 diesel engines or, 2 × Waukesha Engine L-1616 diesel engines
- Propulsion: Snow and Knobstedt single reduction gear; 2 × variable pitch propellers
- Speed: 13 knots (24 km/h; 15 mph)
- Complement: 36–43
- Sensors & processing systems: Varies by nation; SPS-53 radar; Decca 45 radar; Decca 707 radar; Decca TM626 radar; Decca RM914 radar; UQS-1 sonar; UQS-10 sonar
- Armament: Varies by nation; 2 × twin 20 mm (0.8 in) Oerlikon cannons anti-aircraft (AA) mounts; 2 × single 20 mm Oerlikon cannon (AA) mounts; 1 × 40 mm (1.6 in) Bofors (AA) mount; 2 × caliber .50 in (12.7 mm) machine guns; 1 × 81 mm mortar

The Adjutant-class auxiliary motor minesweepers were built for the United States Navy throughout the 1950s and 1960s, even as late as 1978. Most were loaned to foreign countries under the Military Defense Assistance Pact, with only 24 actually commissioned by the US Navy, with 13 of those eventually being transferred to foreign nations as well. Initially classified as auxiliary motor minesweepers (AMS), on 7 February 1955, they were reclassified as coastal minesweepers (minesweeper, coastal) (MSC).

== Design ==
The Adjutant-class minesweepers were of a wooden construction with brass and stainless steel fittings to reduce magnetic attraction. The rated displacement was 330 long tons (340 t) light and 390 long tons (400 t) at full load, though the ships of the Redwing class show a displacement of 412 long tons (419 t) and the Albatross class show a displacement of 320 long tons (330 t). They were 138 ft (42 m) between the perpendiculars with an overall length of 144 ft (44 m). They had a beam of 27 ft (8.2 m) with a 8 ft 6 in (2.59 m) draft.

Half of the US ships used four Packard 300 hp (220 kW) diesel engines. The rest and most of the ships built for use by foreign nations used two General Motors 440 hp (330 kW) 8-268A diesel engines.

== Classes ==
The first ship of the class was to be USS Adjutant (AMS-60). However, the name Adjutant was canceled and the ship was transferred to the Portuguese Navy as Ponta Delgada (M 405). The first ship commissioned by the US Navy was Bluebird. This is where the US ships got their class name. With slight changes in design, some of the ships are referred to by other class names, such as Falcon class, Redwing class, Albatross class, or even under Adjutant class.

While in the service of foreign navies they could be referred to under other class names:

| Navy | Class name | Number of ships |
|---|---|---|
| Belgian Navy | Diest-class coastal minesweeper | 18 from US, 8 built in Belgium with US funding |
| Royal Danish Navy | Sund-class coastal minesweeper | 8 |
| French Navy | Pavot-class coastal minesweeper | 30 (36 originally allocated) |
| Hellenic Navy | Antiopi (Αντιόπη)-class minesweeper | 17 |
| Indonesian Navy | Pulau Alor-class coastal minesweeper | 6 |
| Iranian Navy | Shahrokh (شاهرخ)-class coastal minesweeper | 4 |
| Italian Navy | Abete-class coastal minesweeper | 25 |
| Japan Maritime Self-Defense Force | Yashima (やしま)-class coastal minesweeper | 4 |
| Republic of Korea Navy | Geumsan/Kum San-class coastal minesweeper | 8 |
| Royal Netherlands Navy | Beemster-class coastal minesweeper | 14 |
| Royal Norwegian Navy | Sauda-class coastal minesweeper | 5 |
| Pakistan Navy | Mahmood (محمود)-class coastal minesweeper | 8 |
| Philippine Navy | Zambales-class coastal minesweeper | 2 |
| Portuguese Navy | Ponta Delgada-class minesweeper | 8 |
| Spanish Navy | Nalón-class minesweeper | 12 |
| Republic of China Navy | Yung Ping (永平)-class coastal minesweeper | 14 |
| Royal Thai Navy | Bangkeo (บางแก้ว)-class coastal minesweeper | 4 |
| Turkish Navy | Seymen-class minesweeper | 12 |
| United States Navy | Adjutant class, Bluebird class, Falcon class, Redwing class, Albatross class | 24 |
| Republic of Vietnam Navy | Hàm Tử II-class coastal minesweeper | 3 |

== Ships in class ==
| No. | Name | Country | Builder | Laid down | Launched | Commissioned | Notes |
|---|---|---|---|---|---|---|---|
| 60 | Adjutant (AMS-60)/ Ponta Delgada (M 405) | Portugal | Consolidated Shipbuilding Corp., Morris Heights, New York | N/A | N/A | 30 June 1953† | discarded 1973 |
| 61 | Horta (M 406) | Portugal | Consolidated Shipbuilding Corp., Morris Heights, New York | N/A | N/A | 30 June 1953† | discarded 1976 |
| 62 | Angra Do Heroismo (M 407) | Portugal | Consolidated Shipbuilding Corp., Morris Heights, New York | N/A | N/A | 12 August 1953† | discarded 1973 |
| 63 | Lier (M 912) | Belgium | Henry B. Nevins, Inc., City Island, New York | May 1951 | N/A | August 1953 | returned to US, 1969 transferred to the Republic of China, 1969; Yung Shan (M 165) scrapped 1983 |
| 64 | St. Niklaas (M 918) | Belgium | Henry B. Nevins, Inc., City Island, New York | July 1951 | N/A | February 1954 | returned to US, 1969 transferred to the Republic of China, 1969; Yung Jen (M 163) struck 1995 |
| 65 | Diksmuide (M 920) | Belgium | Henry B. Nevins, Inc., City Island, New York | November 1951 | N/A | March 1954 | returned to US, 1969 transferred to the Republic of China, 1969; Yung Sui (M 164) struck 1994 |
| 66 | Aconite (M 640)/ Marjolaine, 1966 | France | Harbor Boat Building Company, Terminal Island, California | 1952 | 12 April 1952 | March 1953 | loaned to Tunisia, 1977; Sousse (M 640) scrapped 1988 |
| 67 | Azalée (M 668) | France | Harbor Boat Building Company, Terminal Island, California | 1952 | 1953 | 9 October 1953 | scrapped August 1985 |
| 68 | Camélia (M 671) | France | Harbor Boat Building Company, Terminal Island, California | 1952 | 1953 | 26 February 1954 | scrapped 1983 |
| 69 | Bittern (AMS-69)/ Acacia (M 638) | France | Frank L. Samples Jr., Inc., Boothbay Harbor, Maine | 1952 | 15 February 1952 | 14 June 1953 | struck 1983 |
| 70 | Chukor (AMS 70)/ Acanthe (M 639) | France | Frank L. Samples Jr., Inc., Boothbay Harbor, Maine | 1952 | 1953 | 9 October 1953 | sold 1984 |
| 71 | Ajonc (M 667/A 701) | France | Frank L. Samples Jr., Inc., Boothbay Harbor, Maine | 1952 | 1953 | 26 February 1954 | sold 1989 |
| 72 | Dotterel (AMS-72)/ Abete (M 5501) | Italy | Burger Boat Company, Manitowoc, Wisconsin | N/A | N/A | 13 January 1953 | scrapped 1977 |
| 73 | Betulla (M 5503) | Italy | Burger Boat Company, Manitowoc, Wisconsin | N/A | N/A | 6 July 1953 | scrapped 1974 |
| 74 | Castagno (M 5504) | Italy | Henry C. Grebe and Co., Inc., Chicago, Illinois | N/A | 2 February 1954 | 6 July 1955 | transferred to Greece, 10 October 1995; Erato (M 60) fate unknown |
| 75 | Gelso (M 5509) | Italy | Henry C. Grebe and Co., Inc., Chicago, Illinois | N/A | 2 February 1954 | 29 December 1953 | transferred to Greece, 10 October 1995; Evniki (M 61) fate unknown |
| 76 | Ontano (M 5513) | Italy | Henry C. Grebe and Co., Inc., Chicago, Illinois | 1952 | 12 August 1953 | 26 October 1954 | struck 1993 |
| 77 | Macaw (AMS-77)/ Diest (M 910) | Belgium | Quincy Adams Yacht Yard, Inc., Quincy, Massachusetts | June 1951 | N/A | May 1953 | returned to US, 1969 transferred to the Republic of China, 1969; Yung Fu (M 162) struck 1995 |
| 78 | Maaseik (M 913) | Belgium | Quincy Adams Yacht Yard, Inc., Quincy, Massachusetts | May 1951 | N/A | August 1953 | returned to US, 1969 transferred to the Republic of China, 1969; Yung Chen (M 168) fate unknown |
| 79 | Acacia (M 5502) | Italy | Lake Union Dry Dock Co., Seattle, Washington | N/A | N/A | 4 August 1953 | scrapped 1974 |
| 80 | Ciciegio (M 5506) | Italy | Lake Union Dry Dock Co., Seattle, Washington | N/A | N/A | 4 August 1953 | scrapped 1980 |
| 81 | Faggio (M 5507) | Italy | Lake Union Dry Dock Co., Seattle, Washington | N/A | N/A | 15 September 1953 | fate unknown |
| 82 | Larice (M 5510) | Italy | Lake Union Dry Dock Co., Seattle, Washington | N/A | N/A | 29 December 1953 | fate unknown |
| 83 | Bégonia (M 669/Q 591) | France | Stephen Brothers, Inc., Stockton, California | 1952 | 1953 | 26 February 1954 | returned to US 1974 fate unknown |
| 84 | Coquelicot (M 673) | France | Stephen Brothers, Inc., Stockton, California | 1952 | 1953 | 26 February 1954 | transferred to Tunisia, 21 June 1973, Hannibal (M 673) discarded 1988 |
| 85 | Giroflée (M 677) | France | Stephen Brothers, Inc., Stockton, California | 1952 | 1953 | 1 June 1954 | scrapped 1981 |
| 86 | Laurier (M 681) | France | Stephen Brothers, Inc., Stockton, California | 1952 | 1953 | 24 June 1954 | scrapped 1983 |
| 87 | Magnolia (M 685/A 770) | France | Stephen Brothers, Inc., Stockton, California | 1952 | 1953 | 30 October 1954 | scrapped 1988 |
| 88 | Cedro (M 5505) | Italy | Berg Shipyard, Blaine, Washington | N/A | N/A | 26 October 1954 | struck 1988 |
| 89 | Frassino (M 5508) | Italy | Berg Shipyard, Blaine, Washington | N/A | N/A | 23 October 1953 | scrapped 1982 |
| 90 | Noce (M 5511) | Italy | Berg Shipyard, Blaine, Washington | N/A | N/A | 6 May 1954 | scrapped 1982 |
| 91 | Vila Do Porto (M 408) | Portugal | M. M. Davis and Son, Inc., Solomons, Maryland | N/A | N/A | 20 September 1953† | scrapped 1976 |
| 92 | Santa Cruz (M 409) | Portugal | M. M. Davis and Son, Inc., Solomons, Maryland | N/A | N/A | 13 February 1954† | scrapped 1973 |
| 93 | Lilas (M 682) | France | National Steel and Shipbuilding Co., San Diego, California | 1952 | 1953 | 8 July 1954 | scrapped 1986 |
| 94 | Marguerite (M 686) | France | National Steel and Shipbuilding Co., San Diego, California | 1952 | 1953 | 17 September 1954 | returned to US, 10 November 1969 transferred to Uruguay; Rio Negro (MS 131) fate unknown |
| 95 | Narcisse/Alysse (M 690) | France | National Steel and Shipbuilding Co., San Diego, California | 1953 | 11 January 1954 | 6 October 1954 | transferred to Japan, 1956; Hashima (MSC 652) reclassified (YAS 47), 2 March 1970 scrapped 31 March 1976 |
| 96 | Lobélla (M 684) | France | Tacoma Boatbuilding Company, Tacoma, Washington | 1952 | 1 May 1953 | 1 January 1955 | scrapped August 1985 |
| 97 | Muguet (M 688) | France | Tacoma Boatbuilding Company, Tacoma, Washington | 1953 | 1954 | 1 January 1955 | scrapped 1984 |
| 98 | Liseron (M 683) | France | Tacoma Boatbuilding Company, Tacoma, Washington | 1953 | 1954 | 1 January 1955 | converted to Diving Tender (A 723), 1974; sold to The Boat Company, Port Orchard, Washington, 1988; in service as passenger vessel as of 2020 |
| 99 | Mimosa (M 687) | France | Tacoma Boatbuilding Company, Tacoma, Washington | 1953 | 1954 | 21 May 1955 | scrapped August 1985 |
| 100 | Breukelen (M 852) | Netherlands | Tampa Marine Co., Tampa, Florida | 29 February 1952 | 12 March 1953 | 14 February 1954 | scrapped 17 January 1974 |
| 101 | Eeklo (M 911) | Belgium | Hodgdon Brothers, Goudy and Stevens, East Boothday, Maine | August 1951 | N/A | June 1953 | returned to US, 1969 transferred to the Republic of China, 1969; Yung Ching (M 167) fate unknown |
| 102 | Sauda (M 311) | Norway | Hodgdon Brothers, Goudy and Stevens, East Boothday, Maine | 1952 | 4 October 1952 | 25 August 1953 | Decommissioned, 8 May 1981. Sold 1987. |
| 103 | Roeselaere (M 914) | Belgium | Hodgdon Brothers, Goudy and Stevens, East Boothday, Maine | July 1951 | 6 December 1952 | August 1953 | returned to US, 1966 transferred to Norway, 1969; Tana (M 313) struck 1997 |
| 104 | Arlon (M 915) | Belgium | Hodgdon Brothers, Goudy and Stevens, East Boothday, Maine | September 1951 | 31 January 1953 | November 1953 | returned to US, 1966 transferred to Norway, 1969; Alta (M 314) museum vessel at Royal Norwegian Navy Museum |
| 105 | Beemster (M 845) | Netherlands | Tampa Marine Co., Tampa, Florida | November 1951 | 24 September 1952 | July 1953 | scrapped 26 April 1976 |
| 106 | Bedum (M 847) | Netherlands | Tampa Marine Co., Tampa, Florida | December 1951 | 29 October 1952 | August 1953 | struck 1975, scrapped |
| 107 | Borculo (M 849) | Netherlands | Tampa Marine Co., Tampa, Florida | December 1951 | 26 November 1952 | 20 October 1953 | scrapped 26 April 1976 |
| 108 | Borne (M 850) | Netherlands | Tampa Marine Co., Tampa, Florida | January 1952 | 7 January 1953 | 3 December 1953 | scrapped 26 April 1976 |
| 109 | Bolsward (M 846) | Netherlands | Broward Marine Inc., Fort Lauderdale, Florida | October 1951 | 5 November 1952 | 5 November 1953 | returned to US, 18 September 1972 scrapped |
| 110 | Beilen (M 848) | Netherlands | Broward Marine Inc., Fort Lauderdale, Florida | October 1951 | 14 February 1953 | 26 April 1954 | sold, 13 April 1976, to Bruczak, Canada fate unknown |
| 111 | Brummen (M 851) | Netherlands | Broward Marine Inc., Fort Lauderdale, Florida | February 1952 | 31 December 1952 | February 1954 | scrapped, 30 March 1976 |
| 112 | Blaricum (M 853) | Netherlands | Broward Marine Inc., Fort Lauderdale, Florida | 29 September 1952 | 31 October 1953 | 7 June 1954 | scrapped, 1979 |
| 113 | Chrysanthème (M 672) | France | Tacoma Boatbuilding Company, Tacoma, Washington | 1952 | 19 July 1952 | 1 June 1954 | scrapped, October 1985 |
| 114 | Gardénia (M 676) | France | Tacoma Boatbuilding Company, Tacoma, Washington | N/A | 1953 | 30 August 1954 | reclassified, (A 711); 1974 sold 1989 |
| 115 | Jacinthe (M 680) | France | Tacoma Boatbuilding Company, Tacoma, Washington | 1953 | March 1954 | 30 October 1954 | reclassified, (A 680); July 1976 struck 1982 |
| 116 | Bleuet (M 670) | France | Pacific Boatbuilding Co., Tacoma, Washington | 1952 | 1953 | 1 January 1954 | reclassified, (Q 583) sold 1983 |
| 117 | Églantine (M 675) | France | Pacific Boatbuilding Co., Tacoma, Washington | 1952 | 1 April 1953 | 30 August 1954 | scrapped, August 1985 |
| 118 | Glycine (M 679) | France | Pacific Boatbuilding Co., Tacoma, Washington | 1952 | 1953 | 30 October 1954 | scrapped, August 1985 |
| 119 | Cyclamen (M 674) | France | National Steel and Shipbuilding Co., San Diego, California | 1952 | 21 June 1953 | 21 May 1954 | struck 1983 |
| 120 | Glaïeul (M 678) | France | National Steel and Shipbuilding Co., San Diego, California | 1952 | 1953 | 1 June 1954 | reclassified, (Q 592) fate unknown |
| 121 | Bluebird (AMS/MSC-121) | United States | Mare Island Naval Shipyard, Vallejo, California | 5 February 1952 | 11 May 1953 | 24 July 1953 | reclassified Coastal Minesweeper, 7 February 1955 sold for scrap, September 1979 |
| 122 | Cormorant (AMS/MSC-122) | United States | Mare Island Naval Shipyard, Vallejo, California | 5 February 1952 | 8 June 1953 | 14 August 1953 | reclassified Coastal Minesweeper, 7 February 1955 sold for scrap, 1 December 1974 |
| 123 | Myosotis (M 689) | France | Stephen Brothers, Inc., Stockton, California | 1953 | 1954 | 1954 | returned to US, June 1955 transferred to the Republic of China, 1969; Yung An (MSC 156) scrapped 1993 |
| 124 | Pavot (M 631) | France | Stephen Brothers, Inc., Stockton, California | 1952 | 21 November 1953 | October 1955 | returned to US, 24 March 1970 transferred to the Republic of Turkey; Selçuk (M 508/Y 90) reclassified Survey vessel, April 1998 fate unknown |
| 125 | Pivoine (M 633) | France | Stephen Brothers, Inc., Stockton, California | 1953 | 1954 | 1 January 1955 | scrapped 1984 |
| 126 | Réséda (M 635) | France | Stephen Brothers, Inc., Stockton, California | 1953 | 1954 | 21 May 1955 | scrapped 1984 |
| 127 | Aarøsund (M 571) | Denmark | Hiltebrant Drydock Co., Kingston, New York | 24 September 1952 | 1 April 1954 | 24 January 1955 | Decommissioned 1 March 1982 |
| 128 | Alssund (M 572) | Denmark | Hiltebrant Drydock Co., Kingston, New York | 8 September 1952 | 19 November 1953 | 5 April 1955 | struck 1989 |
| 129 | Egernsund (M 573) | Denmark | Hiltebrant Drydock Co., Kingston, New York | 10 April 1953 | 14 April 1954 | 3 August 1955 | Decommissioned 31 December 1989 |
| 130 | Turia (M 27/PVZ 54/P 54) | Spain | Hiltebrant Drydock Co., Kingston, New York | N/A | 14 July 1954 | 1 June 1955 | reclassified Patrol Craft, 1980 sunk as artificial reef, 2 August 1999 |
| 131 | De Panne (M 925) | Belgium | Hiltebrant Drydock Co., Kingston, New York | November 1953 | N/A | September 1954 | returned to US, 1969 transferred to the Republic of Turkey; Seymen (M 507) fate unknown |
| 132 | Sira (M 312) | Norway | Hiltebrant Drydock Co., Kingston, New York | 1954 | 26 October 1954 | 28 November 1955 | struck 1992 |
| 133 | Olmo (M 5512) | Italy | Bellingham Shipyard Co., Bellingham, Washington | N/A | N/A | 30 March 1954 | scrapped 1980 |
| 134 | Pino (M 5514) | Italy | Bellingham Shipyard Co., Bellingham, Washington | N/A | N/A | 13 May 1954 | scrapped 1980 |
| 135 | Pioppo (M 5515/A 5307) | Italy | Bellingham Shipyard Co., Bellingham, Washington | N/A | 15 August 1953 | 31 July 1954 | reclassified Oceanographic Survey Ship, 1973 scrapped 2002 |
| 136 | Platano (M 5516) | Italy | Bellingham Shipyard Co., Bellingham, Washington | N/A | N/A | 9 September 1954 | struck 1990 |
| 137 | Quercia (M 5517) | Italy | Bellingham Shipyard Co., Bellingham, Washington | N/A | N/A | 4 November 1954 | struck 1981 |
| 138 | Muhafiz (M 163) | Pakistan | Bellingham Shipyard Co., Bellingham, Washington | N/A | N/A | February 1955 | sunk by India, 4 December 1971; 24°33′N 66°49.5′E |
| 139 | Nalón (M 21/PVZ-51/P 51) | Spain | South Coast Co., Newport Beach, California | 22 November 1952 | 1 June 1955 | 30 April 1955 | reclassified Patrol Craft, 1980 sunk as artificial reef, 6 June 1999 |
| 140 | Pâquerette (M 692) | France | South Coast Co., Newport Beach, California | 1953 | 1954 | 14 August 1954 | returned to US, June 1955 transferred to the Republic of China, 1969; Yung Ping (MSC 155) scrapped 1982 |
| 141 | Pervenche (M 632/694) | France | South Coast Co., Newport Beach, California | 1953 | 1954 | 30 October 1954 | sold for scrap, 25 November 1982 |
| 142 | Renoncule (M 634/696) | France | South Coast Co., Newport Beach, California | 1953 | 22 May 1953 | 1 January 1955 | returned to US, 24 March 1970 transferred to the Republic of Turkey; Seyhan (M 509) struck 1998 |
| 143 | Roselys (M 698) | France | South Coast Co., Newport Beach, California | 1953 | 25 July 1953 | November 1954 | order canceled and allotted to Spain transferred, 5 November 1954; Llobregat (M 22) lost by fire 1979 |
| 144 | Tulipe (M 699) | France | South Coast Co., Newport Beach, California | 1953 | 1953 | December 1954 | order canceled and allotted to Japan transferred, 1 December 1954; Yashima (MSC 651/YAS 46) reclassified 2 March 1970 struck 1978 |
| 145 | Velas (M 410) | Portugal | Stowman Shipyards, Inc., Dorchester, New Jersey | N/A | N/A | 26 April 1954† | scrapped 1976 |
| 146 | Lajes (M 411) | Portugal | Stowman Shipyards, Inc., Dorchester, New Jersey | N/A | N/A | 13 August 1954† | scrapped 1975 |
| 147 | S. Pedro (M 412) | Portugal | Stowman Shipyards, Inc., Dorchester, New Jersey | N/A | N/A | 17 November 1954† | scrapped 1975 |
| 148 | Breskens (M 855) | Netherlands | George W. Kneass Co., San Francisco, California | 29 April 1952 | 11 April 1953 | 21 April 1954 | returned to US custody, sold sold, 1976 renamed Kalbarrie sold, 1990 renamed Pax donated 2012 |
| 149 | Boxtel (M 857) | Netherlands | George W. Kneass Co., San Francisco, California | 1 May 1952 | 12 September 1953 | 28 July 1954 | sold for scrap 7 October 1976 |
| 150 | Brouwershaven (M 858) | Netherlands | George W. Kneass Co., San Francisco, California | 1 May 1952 | 12 September 1953 | 28 July 1954 | sold for scrap 1976 |
| 151 | Bastogne (M 916) | Belgium | Hodgdon Brothers, Goudy and Stevens, East Boothday, Maine | January 1952 | 13 July 1953 | 15 December 1953 | transferred to Norway, 1966; Glomma (M 317) struck 1992, sold for scrap |
| 152 | Herve (M 921) | Belgium | Hodgdon Brothers, Goudy and Stevens, East Boothday, Maine | March 1952 | N/A | April 1954 | returned to US custody, 1969 transferred to Greece, 1969; Antiopi (M 205) fate unknown |
| 153 | Charleroi (M 917) | Belgium | Hodgdon Brothers, Goudy and Stevens, East Boothday, Maine | February 1952 | N/A | February 1954 | transferred to the Republic of China, 1969; Yung Chi (MSC 166) fate unknown |
| 154 | Malmedy (M 922) | Belgium | Hodgdon Brothers, Goudy and Stevens, East Boothday, Maine | April 1952 | N/A | June 1953 | returned to US custody, 1969 transferred to Greece, 1969; Faidra (M 206) fate unknown |
| 155– 166 | canceled | West Germany | | | | | |
| 167 | Brielle (M 854) | Netherlands | Puget Sound Naval Shipyard, Bremerton, Washington | 1953 | 17 October 1953 | 29 December 1954 | sold for scrap 1975 |
| 168 | Bruinisse (M 856) | Netherlands | Puget Sound Naval Shipyard, Bremerton, Washington | 29 February 1952 | 31 December 1952 | 21 January 1954 | sold for scrap 17 January 1974 |
| 169 | St. Truiden (M 919) | Belgium | Consolidated Shipbuilding Corp., Morris Heights, New York | September 1952 | N/A | February 1954 | returned to US custody, 1969 transferred to Greece, 1969; Atlanti (M 202) struck 2004 |
| 170 | Blankenberge (M 923) | Belgium | Consolidated Shipbuilding Corp., Morris Heights, New York | December 1952 | N/A | June 1954 | returned to US custody, 26 September 1969 transferred to Greece, 1969; Thaleia (M 210) scrapped March 2012 |
| 171 | La Roche (M 924) | Belgium | Consolidated Shipbuilding Corp., Morris Heights, New York | 27 March 1953 | 1 July 1954 | August 1954 | returned to US custody transferred to Greece, 1969; Niovi (M 254) struck 2004 |
| 190 | Falcon (AMS/MSC-190) | United States | Quincy Adams Yacht Yard, Inc., Quincy, Massachusetts | 7 May 1953 | 21 September 1953 | 24 November 1954 | reclassified Coastal Minesweeper, 7 February 1955 transferred to Indonesia, 1971; Pulau Aru (M 722) sold for scrap 1 September 1976 |
| 191 | Frigate Bird (AMS/MSC-191) | United States | Quincy Adams Yacht Yard, Inc., Quincy, Massachusetts | 20 July 1953 | 24 October 1953 | 13 January 1955 | reclassified Coastal Minesweeper, 7 February 1955 transferred to Indonesia, 1971; Pulau Atang (M 721) sold for scrap 1 September 1976 |
| 192 | Hummingbird (AMS/MSC-192) | United States | Quincy Adams Yacht Yard, Inc., Quincy, Massachusetts | 24 October 1953 | 25 December 1954 | 9 February 1955 | reclassified Coastal Minesweeper, 7 February 1955 transferred to Indonesia, 1971; Pulau Impalasa (M 720) sold for scrap 1 September 1976 |
| 193 | Jacana (AMS/MSC-193) | United States | Quincy Adams Yacht Yard, Inc., Quincy, Massachusetts | 26 February 1954 | 25 February 1955 | 10 March 1955 | reclassified Coastal Minesweeper, 7 February 1955 transferred to Indonesia, 1971; Pulau Aruan (M 718) sold for scrap 1 September 1976 |
| 194 | Kingbird (AMS/MSC-194) | United States | Quincy Adams Yacht Yard, Inc., Quincy, Massachusetts | 26 February 1954 | 21 May 1954 | 27 April 1955 | reclassified Coastal Minesweeper, 7 February 1955 sold for scrap 1 March 1973 |
| 195 | Limpkin (AMS/MSC-195) | United States | Broward Marine Inc., Fort Lauderdale, Florida | 17 April 1953 | 21 May 1954 | 26 March 1955 | reclassified Coastal Minesweeper, 7 February 1955 transferred to Indonesia, 1971; Pulau Anjer (M 719) sold for scrap 1 September 1976 |
| 196 | Meadowlark (AMS/MSC-196) | United States | Broward Marine Inc., Fort Lauderdale, Florida | 17 April 1953 | 21 May 1954 | 26 March 1955 | reclassified Coastal Minesweeper, 7 February 1955 transferred to Indonesia, 1971; Pulau Alau (M 717) sold for scrap 1 September 1976 |
| 197 | Parrot (AMS/MSC-197) | United States | Broward Marine Inc., Fort Lauderdale, Florida | 23 December 1953 | 27 November 1954 | 28 June 1955 | reclassified Coastal Minesweeper, 7 February 1955 sold for scrap 1 December 1976 |
| 198 | Peacock (AMS/MSC-198) | United States | Harbor Boat Building Co., Terminal Island, California | 29 January 1953 | 19 June 1954 | 16 March 1955 | reclassified Coastal Minesweeper, 7 February 1955 sold for scrap 1 September 1976 |
| 199 | Phoebe (AMS/MSC-199) | United States | Harbor Boat Building Co., Terminal Island, California | 26 February 1953 | 21 August 1954 | 29 April 1955 | reclassified Coastal Minesweeper, 7 February 1955 sold for scrap 1 September 1976 |
| 200 | Redwing (AMS/MSC-200) | United States | Tampa Marine Co., Tampa, Florida | 1 July 1953 | 29 April 1954 | 7 January 1955 | transferred to Spain; Sil (M 29/PVZ 55/M 27) reclassified Patrol Craft, late 1970s reclassified Minsweeper, 1982 fate unknown |
| 201 | Shrike (AMS/MSC-201) | United States | Tampa Marine Co., Tampa, Florida | 1 September 1953 | 21 July 1954 | 21 March 1955 | scrapped April 1978 |
| 202 | Spoonbill (AMS/MSC-202) | United States | Tampa Marine Co., Tampa, Florida | 2 November 1953 | 3 August 1954 | 14 June 1955 | transferred to Spain; Duero (M 28/M 23) fate unknown |
| 203 | Thrasher (AMS/MSC-203) | United States | Tampa Marine Co., Tampa, Florida | 1 April 1954 | 6 October 1954 | 16 August 1955 | transferred to the Republic of Singapore, 1 December 1975; Mercury (M 102) discarded 1995 |
| 204 | Thrush (AMS/MSC-204) | United States | Tampa Marine Co., Tampa, Florida | 7 May 1954 | 5 January 1955 | 8 November 1955 | transferred to Virginia Institute of Marine Science; Virginia Sea scrapped, 1 August 1982 |
| 205 | Vireo (AMS/MSC-205) | United States | Bellingham Shipyard Co., Bellingham, Washington | 14 September 1953 | 30 April 1954 | 7 June 1955 | transferred to the Republic of Fiji, 1 October 1975; Kula (MSC 205) discarded 1985 |
| 206 | Warbler (AMS/MSC-206) | United States | Bellingham Shipyard Co., Bellingham, Washington | 15 October 1953 | 18 June 1954 | 26 July 1955 | sold to the Republic of Fiji, 14 October 1975; Kiro (MSC 206) disposed September 1996 |
| 207 | Whippoorwill (AMS/MSC-207) | United States | Bellingham Shipyard Co., Bellingham, Washington | 7 January 1954 | 13 August 1954 | 20 October 1955 | sold to the Republic of Singapore, Jupiter (M 102) discarded 1990 |
| 208 | Widgeon (AMS/MSC-208) | United States | Bellingham Shipyard Co., Bellingham, Washington | 3 May 1954 | 15 October 1954 | 16 November 1955 | scrapped June 1974 |
| 209 | Woodpecker (MSC-209) | United States | Bellingham Shipyard Co., Bellingham, Washington | 23 June 1954 | 7 January 1955 | 3 February 1956 | transferred to the Republic of Fiji; Kikau (MSC 204) sunk as artificial reef 1990 |
| 214 | Bambù (M 5521/P 495) | Italy | Cantieri Riuniti dell'Adriatico, Monfalcone, Italy | N/A | N/A | 8 September 1956 | reclassified Patrol Craft, 1985 fate unknown |
| 215 | Ebano (M 5522) | Italy | Cantieri Riuniti dell'Adriatico, Monfalcone, Italy | N/A | N/A | 8 November 1956 | fate unknown |
| 216 | Mango (M 5523/P 496) | Italy | Cantieri Riuniti dell'Adriatico, Monfalcone, Italy | N/A | N/A | 5 December 1956 | reclassified Patrol Craft, 1985 fate unknown |
| 217 | Mogano (M 5524/P 497) | Italy | Cantieri Riuniti dell'Adriatico, Monfalcone, Italy | N/A | N/A | 9 January 1957 | reclassified Patrol Craft, 1985 fate unknown |
| 218 | Zambales (PM 55) | Philippines | Bellingham Shipyards Co., Bellingham, Washington | N/A | N/A | 15 February 1956† | struck 1979 |
| 219 | Zamboanga Del Norte (PM 56) | Philippines | Bellingham Shipyards Co., Bellingham, Washington | N/A | N/A | 3 April 1956† | struck 1979 |
| 220 | Júcar (M 23) | Spain | Bellingham Shipyards Co., Bellingham, Washington | N/A | N/A | 4 June 1956† | scrapped after 3 December 2001 |
| 221 | Omøsund (M 576) | Denmark | Bellingham Shipyards Co., Bellingham, Washington | 1 March 1955 | 30 July 1955 | 21 June 1956† | struck 1982 |
| 238 | Palma (M 5525/P 498) | Italy | Cantieri Riuniti dell'Adriatico, Monfalcone, Italy | N/A | N/A | 1 March 1957 | reclassified Patrol Craft, 1985 fate unknown |
| 239 | Rovere (M 5526) | Italy | Cantieri Riuniti dell'Adriatico, Monfalcone, Italy | N/A | N/A | 1 March 1957 | fate unknown |
| 240 | Sandalo (M 5527) | Italy | Cantieri Riuniti dell'Adriatico, Monfalcone, Italy | N/A | N/A | 17 April 1957 | scrapped |
| 255 | Tsushima (MSC 653/YAS 60) | Japan | Stephen Brothers, Inc., Stockton, California | N/A | N/A | 1 July 1956† | reclassified, 31 March 1972 struck 1978 |
| 256 | Grønsund (M 574) | Denmark | Stephen Brothers, Inc., Stockton, California | 24 January 1955 | 12 August 1955 | 21 September 1956 | struck 1995 |
| 257 | Guldborgsund (M 575) | Denmark | Stephen Brothers, Inc., Stockton, California | 17 August 1955 | 17 March 1956 | 19 November 1956 | struck 1992 |
| 258 | Toshima (MSC 654/YAS 61) | Japan | Stephen Brothers, Inc., Stockton, California | N/A | N/A | 28 January 1957† | reclassified, 31 March 1972 struck 1978 |
| 259 | Verviers (M 934) | Belgium | Hodgdon Brothers, Goudy and Stevens, East Boothday, Maine | October 1954 | N/A | 4 June 1956† | converted to Minehunter, 1972 struck 1978 |
| 260 | Veurne (M 935) | Belgium | Hodgdon Brothers, Goudy and Stevens, East Boothday, Maine | December 1954 | N/A | 23 August 1956† | converted to Survey Vessel, 1969 converted to Minehunter, 1972 struck 1987 |
| 261 | Mujahid/Musahid (M 164) | Pakistan | Hodgdon Brothers, Goudy and Stevens, East Boothday, Maine | N/A | N/A | November 1956 | Pakistan Maritime Museum in Karachi, Pakistan |
| 262 | Mubarak (M 162) | Pakistan | Hodgdon Brothers, Goudy and Stevens, East Boothday, Maine | N/A | N/A | 8 January 1957† | struck 1985 |
| 263 | Ulvsund (M 577) | Denmark | Harbor Boat Building Co., Terminal Island, California | 29 July 1955 | 22 December 1955 | 20 September 1956 | struck 1988 |
| 264 | Vilsund (M 578) | Denmark | Harbor Boat Building Co., Terminal Island, California | 12 August 1954 | 10 March 1956 | 15 November 1956 | struck 1995 |
| 265 | Ulla (M 24/PVZ 52/P 52) | Spain | Quincy Adams Yacht Yard, Inc., Quincy, Massachusetts | N/A | 28 January 1956 | 24 July 1956 | reclassified Patrol Craft, 1980 sunk as artificial reef, 14 October 1999 |
| 266 | Miño (M 25/PVZ 23/M 28) | Spain | Quincy Adams Yacht Yard, Inc., Quincy, Massachusetts | N/A | N/A | 9 October 1956† | reclassified Patrol Craft, 1980 struck 2004 |
| 267 | Mahmood (M 160) | Pakistan | Quincy Adams Yacht Yard, Inc., Quincy, Massachusetts | N/A | N/A | 25 April 1957† | struck 1995 |
| 268 | Samsun (M 257/510) | Turkey | Bellingham Shipyards Co., Bellingham, Washington | N/A | 6 September 1957 | 28 September 1958† | struck 2005 |
| 269 | Ebro (M 26/22) | Spain | Bellingham Shipyards Co., Bellingham, Washington | N/A | 8 November 1957 | 18 December 1958† | struck 2005 |
| 270 | Sinop (M 258/511) | Turkey | Bellingham Shipyards Co., Bellingham, Washington | N/A | 4 January 1958 | 23 January 1959† | struck 2004 |
| 271 | Sürmene (M 259/512) | Turkey | Bellingham Shipyards Co., Bellingham, Washington | N/A | 1958 | 13 March 1959† | struck 2005 |
| 272 | Seddülbahír (M 260/513) | Turkey | Bellingham Shipyards Co., Bellingham, Washington | N/A | 1958 | 24 April 1959† | struck 2005 |
| 273 | Munsif (M 166) | Pakistan | Bellingham Shipyards Co., Bellingham, Washington | N/A | N/A | 24 April 1959† | struck 1979 |
| 274 | Mukhtar (M 165) | Pakistan | Bellingham Shipyards Co., Bellingham, Washington | N/A | N/A | 24 July 1959† | struck 1995 |
| 275 | Shahraz (MSC 32) | Iran | Bellingham Shipyards Co., Bellingham, Washington | N/A | N/A | 4 September 1959† | lost by fire, 1975 |
| 276 | Shahrokh (MSC 31/AXT 301) | Iran | Bellingham Shipyards Co., Bellingham, Washington | N/A | N/A | 28 October 1959† | renamed and reclassified, 1998; Hamzeh fate unknown |
| 277 | Yung Nien (MSC 157) | Republic of China | Tacoma Boatbuilding Company, Tacoma, Washington | N/A | 30 June 1958 | 25 May 1959† | struck 1991 |
| 278 | Yung Chou (MSC 158) | Republic of China | Tacoma Boatbuilding Company, Tacoma, Washington | N/A | N/A | 21 June 1959† | fate unknown |
| 279 | Genil (M 31/25) | Spain | Tampa Marine Co., Tampa, Florida | N/A | N/A | 20 August 1959† | struck 2004 |
| 280 | Salice (M 5519/A 5519) | Italy | Tacoma Boatbuilding Company, Tacoma, Washington | N/A | 29 October 1959 | 16 December 1960† | renamed, Mandorlo reclassified Minehunter, 1975 struck 1993 |
| 281 | Hàm Tử II (HQ 114) | Republic of Vietnam | Stephen Brothers, Inc., Stockton, California | N/A | N/A | 26 June 1959† | scrapped |
| 282 | Chương Dương (HQ 115) | Republic of Vietnam | Stephen Brothers, Inc., Stockton, California | N/A | N/A | 21 August 1959† | scrapped |
| 283 | Bạch Đằng II (HQ 116) | Republic of Vietnam | Stephen Brothers, Inc., Stockton, California | N/A | N/A | 18 September 1959† | scrapped, 1970 |
| 284 | Geumsan/Kum San (MSC 522) | Republic of Korea | Harbor Boat Building Co., Terminal Island, California | N/A | N/A | 12 June 1959 | fate unknown |
| 285 | Goheung/Ko Hung (MSC 523) | Republic of Korea | Harbor Boat Building Co., Terminal Island, California | N/A | N/A | 14 August 1959 | fate unknown |
| 286 | Geumgok/Kum Kok (MSC 525) | Republic of Korea | Harbor Boat Building Co., Terminal Island, California | N/A | N/A | 14 August 1959 | fate unknown |
| 287 | Tajo (M 30/24) | Spain | Tampa Marine Co., Tampa, Florida | N/A | 1 May 1958 | 9 July 1959 | struck 2002 |
| 288 | Odiel (M 32/26) | Spain | Tampa Marine Co., Tampa, Florida | N/A | 3 September 1958 | 9 October 1959 | struck 2004 |
| 289 | Albatross (MSC-289) | United States | Tacoma Boatbuilding Company, Tacoma, Washington | 26 February 1959 | 26 March 1960 | 20 April 1961 | sold for scrap November 1970 |
| 290 | Gannet (MSC-290) | United States | Tacoma Boatbuilding Company, Tacoma, Washington | 1 May 1959 | 26 March 1960 | 14 July 1961 | struck 1970 |
| 291 | Simorgh (MSC 33) | Iran | Tacoma Boatbuilding Company, Tacoma, Washington | N/A | 3 March 1961 | 18 September 1961† | sunk 1981 |
| 292 | Karkas (MSC 34) | Iran | Peterson Builders Inc., Sturgeon Bay, Wisconsin | N/A | N/A | 16 May 1962† | sunk 1982–1988 |
| 293 | Momin (M 161) | Pakistan | Peterson Builders Inc., Sturgeon Bay, Wisconsin | N/A | N/A | 14 July 1962† | struck 1985 |
| 294 | Moshal (M 167) | Pakistan | Peterson Builders Inc., Sturgeon Bay, Wisconsin | N/A | N/A | 29 June 1963† | struck 1985 |
| 295 | Namyang/Nam Yang (MSC 526) | Republic of Korea | Peterson Builders Inc., Sturgeon Bay, Wisconsin | N/A | N/A | 13 August 1963† | fate unknown |
| 296 | Hadong/Ha Dong (MSC 527) | Republic of Korea | Peterson Builders Inc., Sturgeon Bay, Wisconsin | N/A | N/A | 14 October 1963† | fate unknown |
| 297 | Ladya (MSC 5) | Kingdom of Thailand | Peterson Builders Inc., Sturgeon Bay, Wisconsin | N/A | N/A | 21 November 1963† | struck 1995 |
| 298 | Doris (M 245) | Greece | Tacoma Boatbuilding Company, Tacoma, Washington | N/A | 14 September 1962 | 9 November 1964† | struck 1995 |
| 299 | Aigli (M 246) | Greece | Tacoma Boatbuilding Company, Tacoma, Washington | N/A | 26 January 1963 | 4 January 1965† | struck 1996 |
| 300 | Yung Ju (MSC 160) | Republic of China | Tacoma Boatbuilding Company, Tacoma, Washington | N/A | N/A | 22 March 1965† | struck 1992 |
| 301 | Tadindeng (MSC 7) | Kingdom of Thailand | Tacoma Boatbuilding Company, Tacoma, Washington | N/A | 11 April 1964 | 17 August 1965† | struck 1992 |
| 302 | Yung Hsin (MSC 159) | Republic of China | Tacoma Boatbuilding Company, Tacoma, Washington | N/A | N/A | 21 December 1965† | struck 1995 |
| 303 | Bangkeo (MSC 6) | Kingdom of Thailand | Dorchester Shipbuilding Corp., Dorchester, New Jersey | N/A | N/A | 24 June 1965† | in service as of 2015 |
| 304 | Silifke (M 263/514) | Turkey | Dorchester Shipbuilding Corp., Dorchester, New Jersey | N/A | 21 November 1964 | 27 July 1965† | fate unknown |
| 305 | Saros (M 264/515) | Turkey | Dorchester Shipbuilding Corp., Dorchester, New Jersey | N/A | 1 May 1965 | 16 December 1965† | in service as of 2015 |
| 306 | Yung Lo (MSC 161) | Republic of China | Dorchester Shipbuilding Corp., Dorchester, New Jersey | N/A | N/A | 11 April 1966† | struck 1993 |
| 307 | Dafni (M 247) | Greece | Peterson Builders Inc., Sturgeon Bay, Wisconsin | N/A | N/A | 2 September 1964 | scrapped, March 2012 |
| 308 | Kichli (M 241) | Greece | Peterson Builders Inc., Sturgeon Bay, Wisconsin | N/A | N/A | 14 July 1964† | fate unknown |
| 309 | Kissa (M 242) | Greece | Peterson Builders Inc., Sturgeon Bay, Wisconsin | N/A | N/A | 1 September 1964† | fate unknown |
| 310 | Aidon (M 248) | Greece | Peterson Builders Inc., Sturgeon Bay, Wisconsin | N/A | N/A | 13 October 1964† | scrapped, 2015 |
| 311 | Sığacık (M 265/516) | Turkey | Peterson Builders Inc., Sturgeon Bay, Wisconsin | N/A | 1 May 1965 | 15 May 1965† | in service as of 2015 |
| 312 | Sapanca (M 266/517) | Turkey | Peterson Builders Inc., Sturgeon Bay, Wisconsin | N/A | 14 September 1964 | 19 June 1965† | in service as of 2015 |
| 313 | Don Chedi (MSC 8) | Kingdom of Thailand | Peterson Builders Inc., Sturgeon Bay, Wisconsin | N/A | N/A | 28 August 1965† | in service as of 2015 |
| 314 | Pleias (M 240) | Greece | Peterson Builders Inc., Sturgeon Bay, Wisconsin | N/A | N/A | 22 June 1967† | fate unknown |
| 315 | Sariyer (M 267/518) | Turkey | Peterson Builders Inc., Sturgeon Bay, Wisconsin | N/A | 21 April 1966 | 28 July 1967† | in service as of 2015 |
| 316 | Samcheok/Sam Chok (MSC 528) | Republic of Korea | Peterson Builders Inc., Sturgeon Bay, Wisconsin | N/A | N/A | 20 June 1968† | fate unknown |
| 317 | Argo (M 213) | Greece | Peterson Builders Inc., Sturgeon Bay, Wisconsin | N/A | N/A | 8 August 1968† | renamed, Kleio fate unknown |
| 318 | Avra (M 214) | Greece | Peterson Builders Inc., Sturgeon Bay, Wisconsin | N/A | N/A | 3 October 1968† | scrapped, 2015 |
| 319 | Alkyon (M 211) | Greece | Peterson Builders Inc., Sturgeon Bay, Wisconsin | N/A | N/A | 3 December 1968† | fate unknown |
| 320 | Yeongdong/Kyong Dong (MSC 529) | Republic of Korea | Harbor Boat Building Co., Terminal Island, California | N/A | N/A | 1 September 1975† | fate unknown |
| 321 | Okcheon/Ok Cheon (MSC 530) | Republic of Korea | Harbor Boat Building Co., Terminal Island, California | N/A | N/A | 1 September 1975† | fate unknown |
| 322 | Addriyah (MSC 412) | Kingdom of Saudi Arabia | Peterson Builders Inc., Sturgeon Bay, Wisconsin | N/A | N/A | 1978† | struck 1997 |
| 323 | Al Qusimah (MSC 414) | Kingdom of Saudi Arabia | Peterson Builders Inc., Sturgeon Bay, Wisconsin | N/A | N/A | 1978† | struck 1997 |
| 324 | Al Wadeeah (MSC 416) | Kingdom of Saudi Arabia | Peterson Builders Inc., Sturgeon Bay, Wisconsin | N/A | N/A | 1978† | struck 1997 |
| 325 | Safwa (MSC 418) | Kingdom of Saudi Arabia | Peterson Builders Inc., Sturgeon Bay, Wisconsin | N/A | N/A | 1978† | struck 1997 |

== Citations ==
=== Online resources ===
- Colton, Tim (2018). "Mine-Warfare Ships (AMS, MSC, MSO, MSI, AMCU) Built Since WWII". ShipbuildingHistory.com.
- Radigan, Joe. "Motor Minesweeper (AMS)". NavSource.

=== Book resources ===
- Blackman, Raymond V. B., ed. (1971). Jane's Fighting Ships 1971–72. London: Sampson Low, Marston & Co., Ltd. ISBN 0-354-00096-9.
- Gardiner, Robert; Chumbley, Stephen, eds. (1995). Conway's All the World's Fighting Ships 1947–1995. Annapolis, Maryland, US: Naval Institute Press. ISBN 1-55750-132-7.
- Miller, David (November 1999). The Cold War: A Military History. New York, New York: St. Martin's Press. ISBN 0-312-24183-6.
- Moore, John, ed. (1991). Jane's American Fighting Ships of the 20th Century. New York, New York: Mallard Press. ISBN 0-7924-5626-2.
