= USS Limpkin (AMS-195) =

Minesweeper of the United States Navy

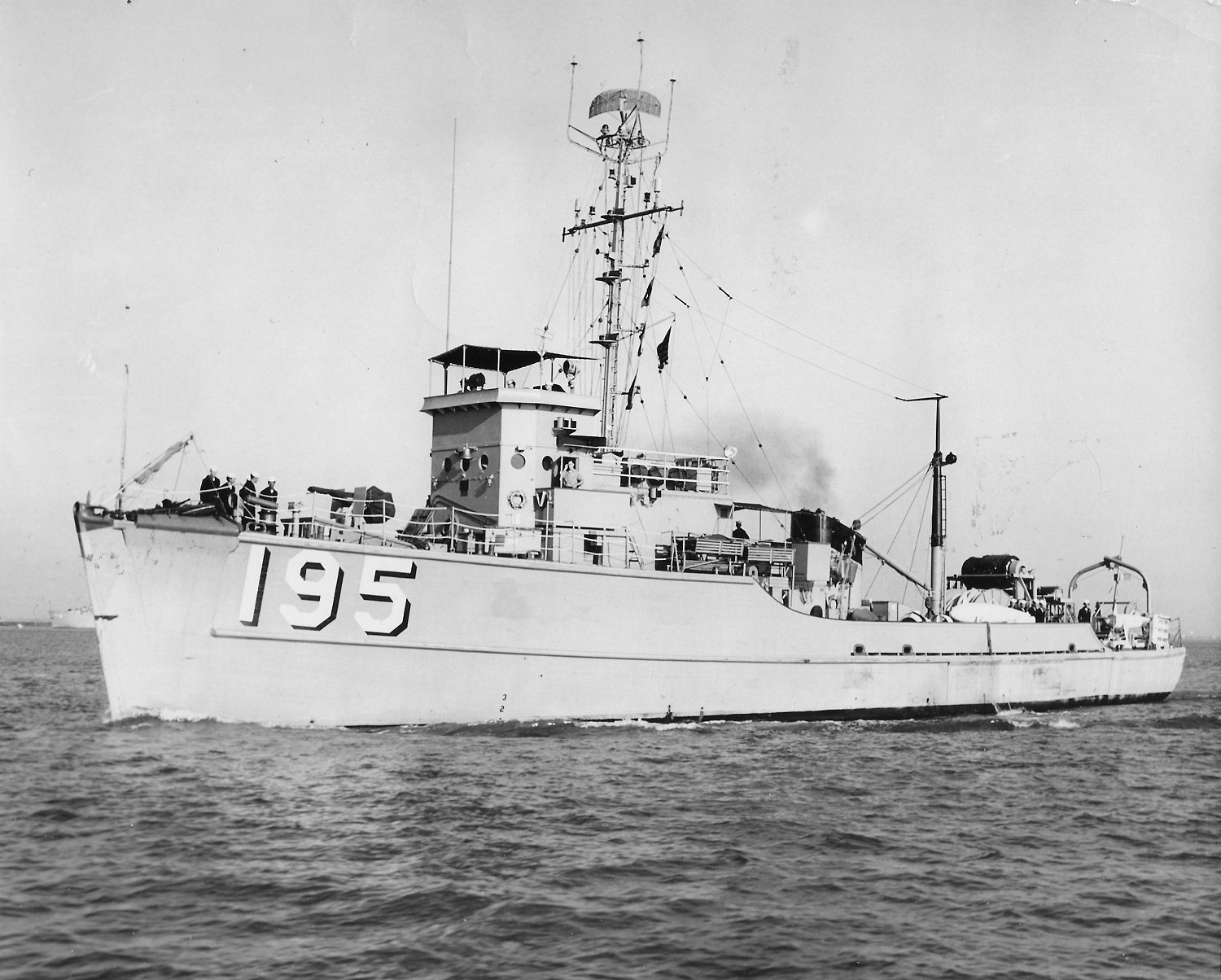
- USS Limpkin (MSC-195), 27 April 1962, at Vieques, Puerto Rico.

History

United States
- Name: Limpkin
- Namesake: Limpkin
- Builder: Broward Marine, Inc., Fort Lauderdale, Florida
- Laid down: 17 April 1953
- Launched: 21 May 1954
- Commissioned: 26 March 1955
- Decommissioned: 26 September 1968
- Reclassified: Coastal Minesweeper, 7 February 1955
- Stricken: 1 May 1976
- Identification: Hull symbol: AMS-195; Hull symbol: MSC-195
- Fate: Transferred to Indonesia, 1971

Indonesia
- Name: Pulau Anjer
- Acquired: 1971
- Identification: Hull symbol: M-719
- Fate: Sold for scrap, 1 September 1976

General characteristics
- Class & type: Bluebird-class minesweeper
- Displacement: 362 long tons (368 t)
- Length: 144 ft 3 in (43.97 m)
- Beam: 27 ft 2 in (8.28 m)
- Draft: 12 ft (3.7 m)
- Installed power: 4 × Packard 600 hp (450 kW) diesel engines; 2,400 hp (1,800 kW)
- Propulsion: 2 × screws
- Speed: 13.6 kn (25.2 km/h; 15.7 mph)
- Complement: 40
- Armament: 2 × twin 20 mm (0.8 in) Oerlikon cannons anti-aircraft (AA) mounts

USS Limpkin (AMS/MSC-195) was a Bluebird-class minesweeper acquired by the United States Navy for clearing coastal minefields.

== Construction ==
The second ship to be named Limpkin by the Navy was laid down 17 April 1953, as AMS-195, by Broward Marine, Inc., Fort Lauderdale, Florida; launched 22 May 1954; sponsored by Mrs. Edward Applegate; reclassified MSC-195 on 7 February 1955; and commissioned 10 April 1955.

== East Coast operations ==
After reporting to Mine Division 45 at Charleston, South Carolina, 15 April 1955, the new coastal minesweeper proceeded to Narragansett Bay, Rhode Island, for shakedown. Returning to Charleston on 19 June, Limpkin trained with the Fleet Sonar School, Key West, Florida, 20 July to 3 August, then returned home for operations off South Carolina and a post shake down overhaul.

== Transferred to MinDiv 41 ==
Transferred to Mine Division 41 on New Year's Day, during 1956, Limpkin worked with the Mine Evaluation Depot, Key West; spent a month undergoing refresher training at Guantanamo Bay, Cuba; and participated in a minesweeping exercise with the Atlantic Fleet.

Shifting home port to Yorktown, Virginia, site of the Navy Mine Warfare School, in January 1957, for the next two years the ship trained Navy men in the dangers and intricacies of minesweeping operations.

== Participating in NATO exercises ==
Changing her home port to Little Creek, Virginia, 1 January 1959, Limpkin operated with the amphibious forces of the Atlantic Fleet and tested experimental minesweeping gear in the Chesapeake Bay. The ship departed Little Creek on 29 September 1960, for the NATO exercise "Sweepclear" off Nova Scotia. Calling briefly at Boston, Massachusetts, Limpkin arrived at Halifax on 6 October, and operated with Canadian minesweepers until 19 October.

Returning to Little Creek 26 October, the ship soon deployed to the Caribbean, visiting Cristobal, Panama, and San Juan, Puerto Rico, during the three-month cruise and participating in LANTPHIBEX 1-61. For the remainder of 1961, she patrolled Chesapeake Bay, evaluating new equipment and training recruits.

== Canadian operations ==
Following another LANTPHIBEX in the Caribbean during early 1962, Limpkin returned to Nova Scotia in October 1962, for a Joint operation "Sweepclear" with Canadian Mine Squadron 1. In 1963, plus operating in the Chesapeake Bay, the ship gained more invaluable training with the Canadians, as "Sweepclear" shifted to Mayport, Florida, thus providing familiarity with the breadth and unity of American-Canadian defense for the eastern coast of North America.

Limpkin continued this pattern of service, perfecting the dangerous art of mine warfare in operations along the Atlantic coast and in the Caribbean until late 1968.

== Inactivation and use as a training ship ==
On 26 September 1968, she decommissioned and was placed in service as a US Naval Reserve training ship, along with Meadowlark, based at Perth Amboy, New Jersey. She continued to give reservists first hand training into 1969.

== Transfer to Indonesia and decommissioning ==
Limpkin was transferred to Indonesia in 1971, and renamed Pulau Anjer (M-719). She was struck from the Naval Register, 1 May 1976; and disposed of for scrap through the Defense Reutilization and Marketing Service on 1 September 1976.

== Bibliography ==
- "Limpkin II (MSC-195)". Dictionary of American Naval Fighting Ships. Naval History and Heritage Command. 29 July 2015. This article incorporates text from this source, which is in the public domain.
- "USS Limpkin (MSC-195)". NavSource.
