= USS Falcon (AMS-190) =

Minesweeper of the United States Navy

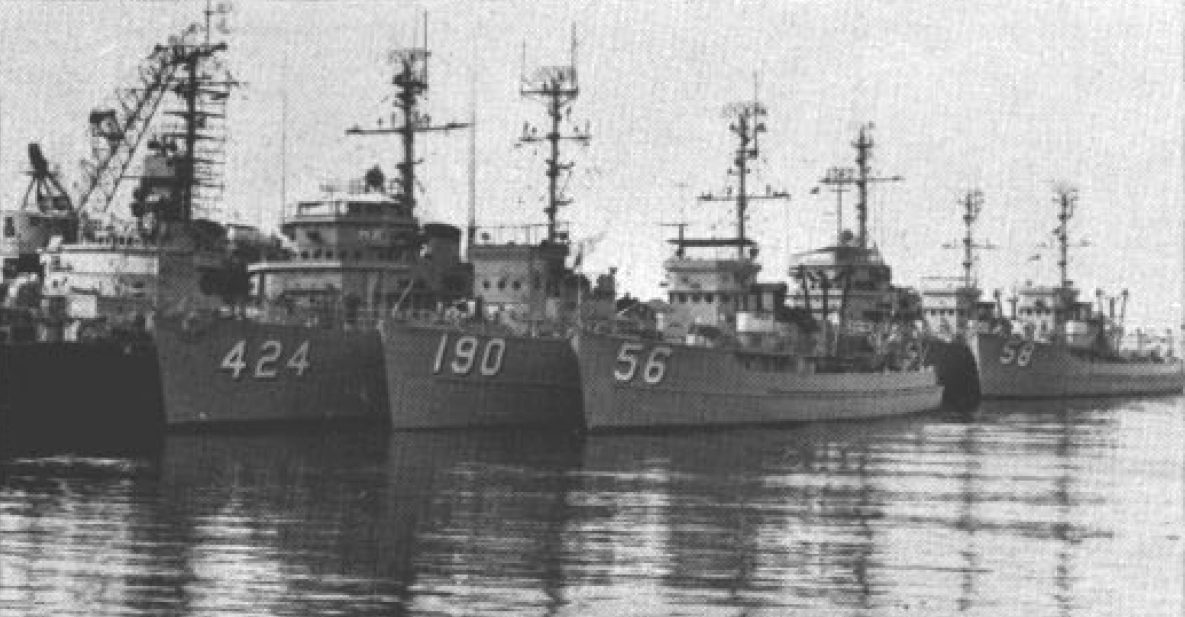
- Falcon (MSC-190), with US Mine Division 22, c. 1965.

History

United States
- Name: Falcon
- Namesake: Falcon
- Builder: Quincy Adams Yacht Yard, Inc., Quincy, Massachusetts
- Laid down: 7 May 1953
- Launched: 21 September 1953
- Commissioned: 24 November 1954
- Reclassified: Coastal Minesweeper, 7 February 1955
- Stricken: 1 May 1976
- Identification: Hull symbol: AMS-190; Hull symbol: MSC-190
- Fate: Transferred to Indonesia, 1971

Indonesia
- Name: Pulau Aru
- Acquired: 1971
- Identification: Hull symbol: M-722
- Fate: Sold for scrap, 1 September 1976

General characteristics
- Class & type: Bluebird-class minesweeper
- Displacement: 362 long tons (368 t)
- Length: 144 ft 3 in (43.97 m)
- Beam: 27 ft 2 in (8.28 m)
- Draft: 12 ft (3.7 m)
- Installed power: 4 × Packard 600 hp (450 kW) diesel engines; 2,400 hp (1,800 kW)
- Propulsion: 2 × screws
- Speed: 13.6 kn (25.2 km/h; 15.7 mph)
- Complement: 39
- Armament: 1 × twin 20 mm (0.8 in) Oerlikon cannons anti-aircraft (AA) mount

The fourth USS Falcon (AMS-190/MSC-190) was a Bluebird-class minesweeper in the United States Navy.

== Construction ==
Falcon was laid down 7 May 1953, as AMS-190; launched 21 September 1953, by Quincy Adams Yacht Yard, Inc., Quincy, Massachusetts; sponsored by Mrs. A. D. MacDonnell; and commissioned 24 November 1954. She was reclassified MSC-190 on 7 February 1955.

== East Coast operations ==
Between 7 January 1955 and 16 January 1957, Falcon was based at Charleston, South Carolina, for minesweeping exercises, amphibious operations, and mine warfare development activities along the east coast and in the Caribbean. Little Creek, the amphibious base in the Norfolk, Virginia, naval complex, was her home port for similar operations until 12 February 1959, when she sailed for Rodman, Canal Zone. During 1960, she sailed out of Rodman for operations on both sides of the Panama Canal, and visits to Central American islands and ports.

== Transfer to Indonesia ==
In 1971, Falcon was transferred to Indonesia and renamed Pulau Aru (M-722. She was struck from the US Naval Register on 1 May 1976, and disposed for scrap through the Defense Reutilization and Marketing Service 1 September 1976.

== Notes ==
Citations

== Bibliography ==
Online resources

- "Falcon IV (AMS-190)". Dictionary of American Naval Fighting Ships. Naval History and Heritage Command. 8 July 2015. This article incorporates text from this source, which is in the public domain.
- "USS Falcon (MSC-190)". NavSource.
