= USS Whippoorwill (AMS-207) =

Minesweeper of the United States Navy

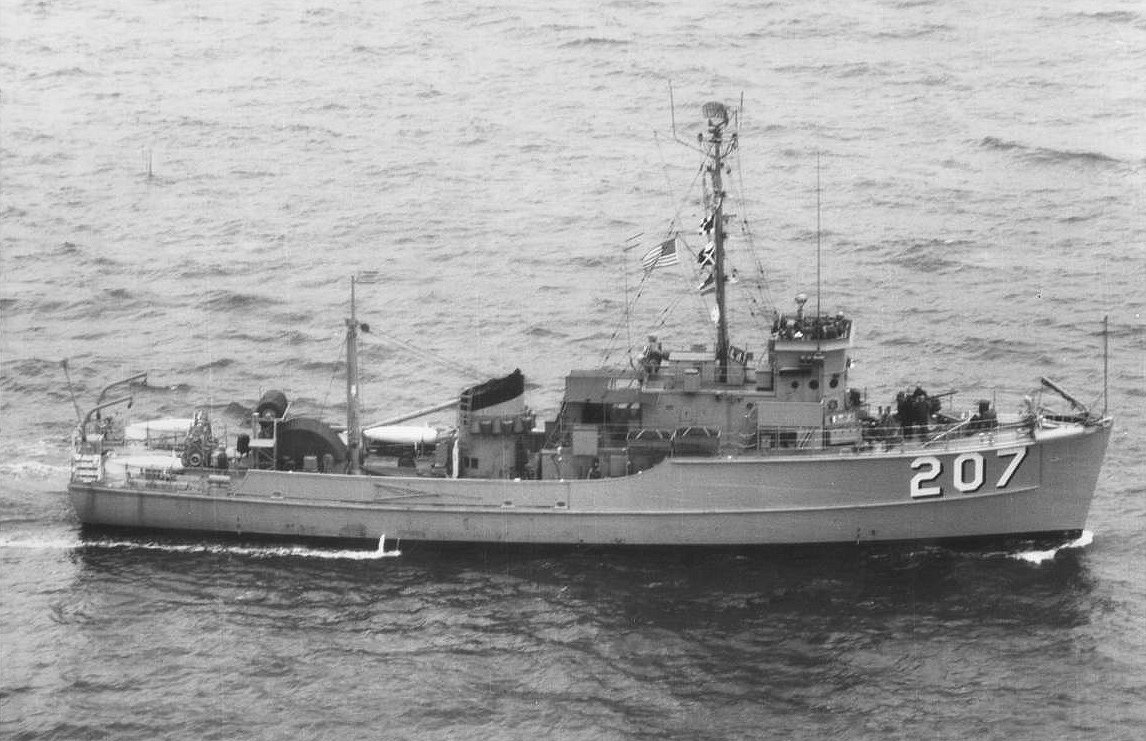
- USS Whippoorwill (MSC-207)

History

United States
- Name: Whippoorwill
- Namesake: Whippoorwill
- Builder: Bellingham Shipyards, Bellingham, Washington
- Laid down: 7 January 1954
- Launched: 13 August 1954
- Commissioned: 20 October 1955
- Decommissioned: 15 December 1970
- In service: 15 December 1970
- Out of service: 30 June 1975
- Reclassified: Coastal Minesweeper, 7 February 1955
- Stricken: 1 July 1975
- Identification: Hull symbol: AMS-207; Hull symbol: MSC-207
- Motto: "Safe in Our Wake"
- Honors and awards: 6 × engagement stars (Vietnam); Meritorious Unit Commendation (Vietnam); Armed Forces Expeditionary Medal (Taiwan)
- Fate: Sold to the Republic of Singapore, August 1979

Singapore
- Name: Jupiter
- Acquired: August 1979
- Identification: Hull sumbol: M-101
- Fate: Scrapped 15 August 1986

General characteristics
- Class & type: Bluebird-class minesweeper
- Displacement: 412 long tons (419 t)
- Length: 145 ft (44 m)
- Beam: 28 ft (8.5 m)
- Draft: 12 ft (3.7 m)
- Installed power: 2 × General Motors 880 horsepower (660 kW) 8-268A diesel engines; 1,760 horsepower (1,310 kW)
- Propulsion: Snow and Knobstedt single reduction gear; 2 × screws
- Speed: 12.8 kn (23.7 km/h; 14.7 mph)
- Complement: 40
- Armament: 2 × 20 mm (0.8 in) Oerlikon cannons anti-aircraft (AA) mounts; 2 × caliber .50 in (12.7 mm) machine guns; 1 × 81 mm mortar

USS Whippoorwill (AMS/MSC-207) was a Bluebird-class minesweeper acquired by the US Navy for clearing coastal minefields.

== Construction ==
Whippoorwill was laid down 7 January 1954 as AMS-207 by Bellingham Shipyards, Bellingham, Washington; launched on 13 August 1954; sponsored by Mrs. Walter A. Yatch; and reclassified as MSC-207 on 7 February 1955. She was commissioned on 20 October 1955 at Tacoma, Washington.

== West Coast operations ==
On 7 November, the mine countermeasures ship reported for duty with the Commander, Mine Force, Pacific Fleet. Over the next 10 months, she first conducted shakedown training along the west coast and then began normal duty with the Mine Force out of Long Beach, California. That duty lasted until 1 August 1956, when she departed Long Beach for her new home port, Sasebo, Japan. After stops at Oahu and Midway Island, the coastal minesweeper arrived at Sasebo on 21 August, and reported for duty to the Commander, Mine Flotilla 1.

== Western Pacific service ==
Whippoorwill was based in Japan for the next 14 years; and, during the first eight of those years, her duties centered upon training. She participated in numerous US 7th Fleet mine exercises as well as many multinational mine exercises with units of the Republic of Korea, Thailand, Japanese, Philippine, and Taiwan navies. She also participated in several large amphibious training exercises conducted in Korea, the Philippines, and at Okinawa in the Ryukyus.

=== Quemoy and Matsu crisis ===
Her one brush with less than peaceful duty came in the fall of 1958, when the Chinese communists began an artillery bombardment of the Nationalist-held islands of Quemoy and Matsu, located just off the mainland China. Whippoorwill earned the Armed Forces Expeditionary Medal for her service in the Second Taiwan Strait Crisis. Her service in the area lasted from 10 September until 4 November, when tension in the area finally began to cool. Upon concluding her service in the Taiwan Strait, she resumed her more peaceful employment in training missions with the 7th Fleet and units of Allied navies.

=== Vietnam War service ===
The year 1964 brought the ship still closer to actual "hot war" operations. From 16 July to 2 August 1964, Whippoorwill joined a barrier patrol established in the South China Sea off the coast of South Vietnam to assist the South Vietnamese Navy in preventing water-borne infiltrators and logistics from North Vietnam from reaching the Viet Cong rebels in the south. During that phase of American involvement, the United States Navy's role remained essentially passive in nature. While American ships such as Whippoorwill stopped no craft themselves, they vectored South Vietnamese ships in on suspicious contacts.

Though the barrier patrols were dissolved on 2 August, and Whippoorwill resumed her familiar training schedule, events occurred in the Gulf of Tonkin that same day which increased American involvement in the Vietnam War and eventually brought Whippoorwill into intimate association with the war over the next six years. After nine months of normal 7th Fleet operations, the minesweeper returned to Vietnamese waters on 18 April 1965, as one of the American ships assigned to "Operation Market Time". That operation consisted of continuous patrols along South Vietnamese coasts in an effort to interdict the increasing volume of arms and supplies being smuggled from the north into South Vietnam in support of Viet Cong guerrillas.

==== Market Time Patrols ====
In many respects, Whippoorwill's "Market Time" duties resembled the barrier patrols she had conducted the previous summer. However, they differed from those patrols in two major respects. First, as a result of the increasingly direct involvement of American forces in the Vietnam War, ships on "Market Time" station actively participated in stop-and-seizure operations rather than limiting themselves to surveillance and passive assistance to the South Vietnamese Navy. Secondly, as a result of the increased communist logistic effort from north to south, "Market Time" operations became a continuous and intensive assignment.

Until she returned to the United States in the fall of 1970, Whippoorwill's sole mission in the Vietnam War consisted of "Market Time" patrols. She alternated month-long tours on station in Vietnamese waters with assignments of variable duration at other points in the Orient. Most often these missions away from Vietnam consisted of mine warfare exercises, upkeep and liberty calls in Japanese ports, and periodic overhauls. Less frequently, they consisted of port calls at other places in the Far East.

== Return to Stateside ==
On 1 September 1970, Whippoorwill concluded her final tour of duty along the coast of Vietnam. She steamed home – via Sasebo, Subic Bay, and Pearl Harbor – and arrived in Long Beach, California, on 12 November.

== Decommissioning – Reserve ship ==
After voyage repairs, she moved to San Francisco, California, where she was decommissioned on 15 December 1970, and placed "in service", along with Thrasher and Reaper, as reserve training ships in Reserve Mine Division 52. For almost five years, she operated out of Naval Station Treasure Island training naval reservists during their annual active duty periods.

== Transfer to the Republic of Singapore Navy ==
On 2 May 1975, Whippoorwill moved from San Francisco to the Inactive Ship Facility at Vallejo, California, where she was deactivated completely and placed "out of service" by 30 June 1975. Her name was struck from the Navy list on 1 July 1975. She was sold to the Republic of Singapore where she served as RSS Jupiter (M-101). Jupiter was scrapped on 15 August 1986.

== Awards ==
Whippoorwill received six battle stars and the Meritorious Unit Commendation for the Vietnam War.

== Notes ==
Citations

== Bibliography ==
Online resources

- "Whippoorwill II (MSC-207)". Dictionary of American Naval Fighting Ships. Naval History and Heritage Command. 28 October 2015. This article incorporates text from this source, which is in the public domain.
- "USS Whippoorwill (MSC-207)". NavSource.
- Liew, Derek (7 October 2005). "Keeping our waters safe: The MCMVs of 194 Squadron". This Month in History. 9 (10). Ministry of Defence, Singapore. Archived from the original on 7 October 2007.
