= USS Frigate Bird (AMS-191) =

Minesweeper of the United States Navy

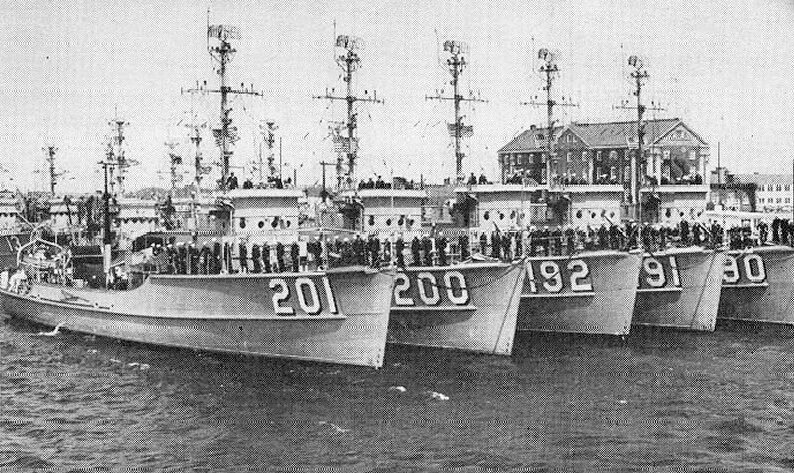
- Shrike (AMS-201), Redwing (MSC-200), Hummingbird (MSC-192), Frigate Bird (MSC-191), and Falcon (MS-190) at Charleston, South Carolina

History

United States
- Name: Frigate Bird
- Namesake: Frigate bird
- Builder: Quincy Adams Yacht Yard, Inc., Quincy, Massachusetts
- Laid down: 20 July 1953
- Launched: 24 October 1953
- Commissioned: 13 January 1955
- Reclassified: Coastal Minesweeper, 7 February 1955
- Stricken: 1 May 1976
- Identification: Hull symbol: AMS-191; Hull symbol: MSC-191
- Fate: Transferred to Indonesia, 1971

Indonesia
- Name: Pulau Atang
- Acquired: 1971
- Identification: Hull symbol: M-721
- Fate: Sold for scrap, 1 September 1976

General characteristics
- Class & type: Bluebird-class minesweeper
- Displacement: 290 long tons (290 t)
- Length: 144 ft 3 in (43.97 m)
- Beam: 28 ft (8.5 m)
- Draft: 9 ft (2.7 m)
- Installed power: 4 × Packard 600 hp (450 kW) diesel engines; 2,400 hp (1,800 kW)
- Propulsion: 2 × screws
- Speed: 13 kn (24 km/h; 15 mph)
- Complement: 39
- Armament: 1 × twin 20 mm (0.8 in) Oerlikon cannons anti-aircraft (AA) mount

USS Frigate Bird (AMS/MSC-191) was a Bluebird-class minesweeper acquired by the US Navy for clearing coastal minefields.

== Construction ==
The second ship in the Navy to be named Frigate Bird, she was laid down 20 July 1953, as AMS-191; launched 24 October 1953, by Quincy Adams Yacht Yard, Inc., Quincy, Massachusetts; sponsored by Mrs. Matthew Gushing; and commissioned 13 January 1955. She was reclassified MSC-191 on 7 February 1955.

== East Coast operations ==
Joining Mine Force, Atlantic Fleet, at Charleston, South Carolina, 21 February 1955, Frigate Bird began a program of US East Coast and Caribbean training and experimental operations which continued through 1960. Among her activities were amphibious exercises on the beaches near Camp Lejeune, North Carolina, surveying ocean currents, testing a new type of can buoy, and taking part in fleet exercises of various types. From July 1958, she was homeported at Little Creek, Virginia, and served at frequent intervals with the Operational Development Force. This minesweeper also participated in the Cuban Blockade in 1962.

== Decommissioning ==
Frigate Bird was transferred to Indonesia in 1971, and renamed Pulau Atang (M-721); struck from the US Naval Vessel Register, 1 May 1976; and, disposed of through the Defense Reutilization and Marketing Service for scrap, 1 September 1976.

== Notes ==
Citations

== Bibliography ==
Online resources

- "Frigate Bird II (AMS-191)". Dictionary of American Naval Fighting Ships. Naval History and Heritage Command. 9 July 2015. This article incorporates text from this source, which is in the public domain.
- "USS Frigate Bird (MSC-191)". NavSource.
