= Spoonbill (disambiguation) =

A spoonbill is a large, long-legged wading bird in the family Threskiornithidae.

Spoonbill may also refer to:

- American Paddlefish, a primitive Chondrostean ray-finned fish colloquially known as spoonbills
- USS Spoonbill (MSC-202), a Bluebird-class motor minesweeper
- The Spoonbills, a "secret army" of innkeepers and peasants in John Buchan's novel Midwinter
- Shoveler, four species of dabbling ducks with long, broad spatula-shaped beaks
- Spoon-billed sandpiper, a critically endangered sandpiper from Southeast Asia.

== See also ==
- Spoon-billed
