= USS Hummingbird (AMS-192) =

Minesweeper of the United States Navy

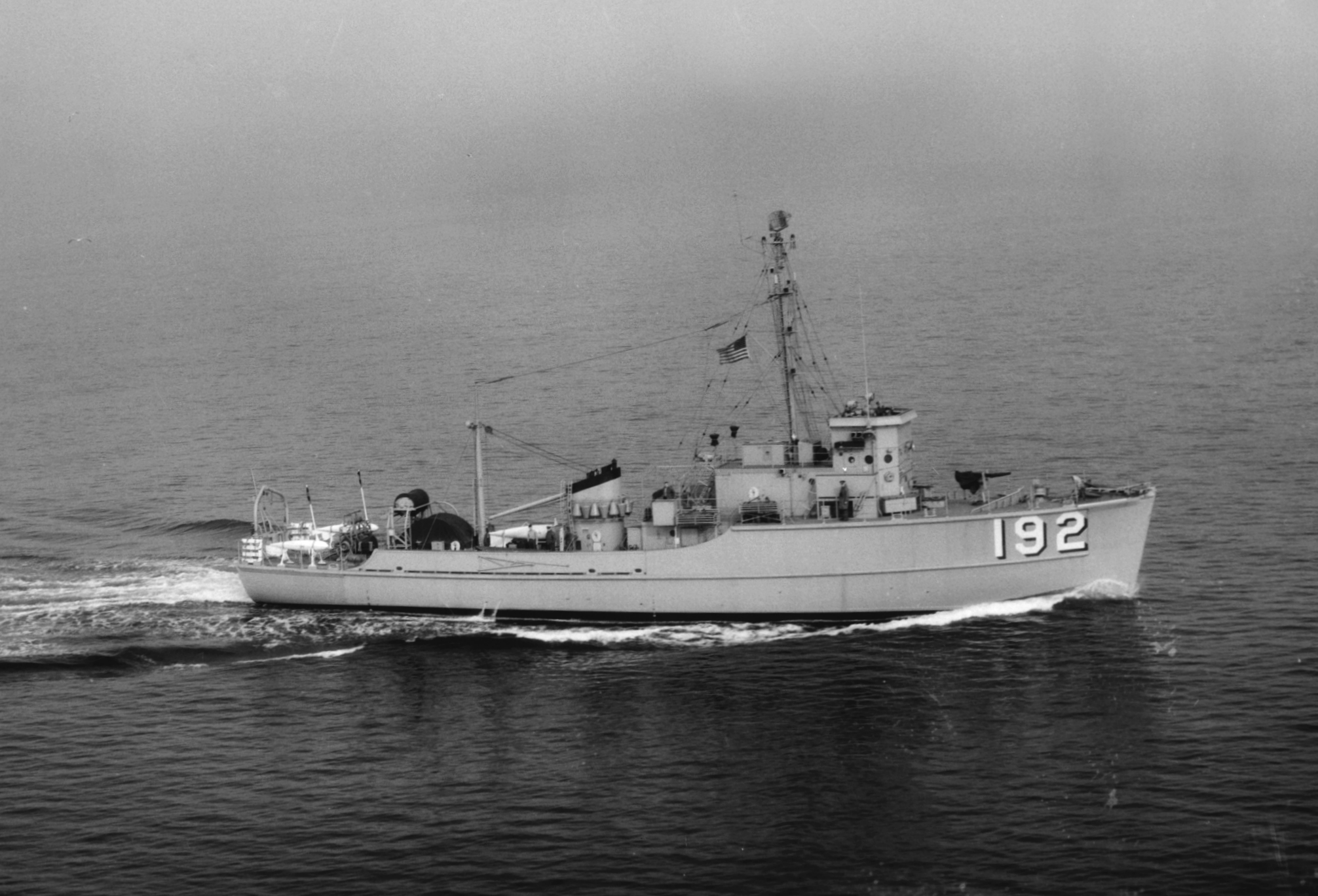
- USS Hummingbird (AMS-192), underway c. 1955.

History

United States
- Name: Hummingbird
- Namesake: Hummingbird
- Builder: Quincy Adams Yacht Yard, Inc., Quincy, Massachusetts
- Laid down: 24 October 1953
- Launched: 25 December 1954
- Commissioned: 9 February 1955
- Reclassified: Coastal Minesweeper, 7 February 1955
- Stricken: 1 May 1976
- Identification: Hull symbol: AMS-192; Hull sumbol: MSC-192
- Fate: Transferred to Indonesia, 1971

Indonesia
- Name: Pulau Impalasa
- Acquired: 1971
- Stricken: 1 May 1976
- Identification: Hull symbol: M-720
- Fate: Sold for scrap, 1 September 1976

General characteristics
- Class & type: Bluebird-class minesweeper
- Displacement: 362 long tons (368 t)
- Length: 144 ft 3 in (43.97 m)
- Beam: 27 ft 2 in (8.28 m)
- Draft: 12 ft (3.7 m)
- Installed power: 4 × Packard 600 hp (450 kW) diesel engines; 2,400 hp (1,800 kW)
- Propulsion: 2 × screws
- Speed: 13.6 kn (25.2 km/h; 15.7 mph)
- Complement: 39
- Armament: 1 × twin 20 mm (0.8 in) Oerlikon cannons anti-aircraft (AA) mount

USS Hummingbird (AMS-192) was a Bluebird-class minesweeper acquired by the US Navy for clearing coastal minefields.

== Construction ==
The second ship to be named Humming Bird by the Navy, usually spelled Hummingbird, was laid down 24 October 1953, as AMS-192; launched 25 December 1954, Quincy Adams Yacht Yard, Inc., Quincy, Massachusetts; sponsored by Mrs. Felice Low; reclassified 7 February 1955; and commissioned 9 February 1955.

== East Coast operations ==
Following shakedown training off Key West, Florida, in June, Hummingbird underwent minesweeping training at Charleston, South Carolina, in July. From 21 October to 14 November, she took part in her first amphibious exercises, sweeping the landing area and dropping marker buoy to guide the simulated assault on the shores of North Carolina. Arriving New York 8 January 1956, she took part in surveying work for the Hydrographic Office until 15 February, after which Hummingbird returned to Charleston.

== Participating in NATO exercises ==
During 1957 and 1958, the ship was based at Mine Warfare School, Yorktown, Virginia, and in March 1958, she participated in another large amphibious operation at Onslow, North Carolina. In 1959, she shifted her home port to the amphibious base at Little Creek, Virginia, and continued to perform minesweeping duties during the periodic practice assaults on the Atlantic coast. She arrived Halifax, Nova Scotia, 6 October 1960, to take part in Sweep Clear V, a NATO minesweeping exercise with Canadian mine craft, returning to Little Creek 26 October. In July 1961, Hummingbird repeated this highly successful combined exercise in Canadian waters.

== Cuban crisis alert status ==
The year 1962 saw more rigorous mine warfare training for Hummingbird, with amphibious operations at Onslow and in the Caribbean. The versatile ship also took part in a search for a downed Air Force plane off Delaware 1 June, before departing for Panama City, Florida, to take part in mine experiments. September included a third NATO minesweeping exercise. As American naval power quarantined Cuba in October, Hummingbird stood ready in case larger operations were necessary, and in early 1963, took part in patrols off Cuba. From 1963 to 1967, the veteran minesweeper continued her training and readiness operations, a vital part of America's fighting power on the seas.

== Decommissioning ==
Hummingbird was transferred to Indonesia in 1971, and renamed Pulau Impalasa (M-720); struck from the Naval Vessel Register, 1 May 1976; returned to US custody; and, disposed of through the Defense Reutilization and Marketing Service for scrap, 1 September 1976.

== Notes ==
Citations

== Bibliography ==
Online resources

- "Humming Bird II (MSC-192)". Dictionary of American Naval Fighting Ships. Naval History and Heritage Command. 20 July 2015. This article incorporates text from this source, which is in the public domain.
- "USS Hummingbird (MSC-192)". NavSource.
