= USS Bluebird (AMS-121) =

Minesweeper of the United States Navy

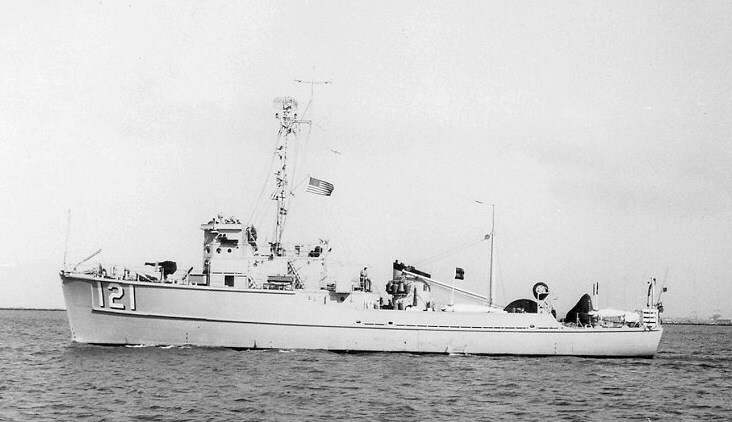
- Broadside view of Bluebird off south end of Mare Island on 29 September 1953.

History

United States
- Name: Bluebird
- Namesake: Bluebird
- Builder: Mare Island Naval Shipyard, Vallejo, California
- Laid down: 5 February 1952
- Launched: 11 May 1953
- Commissioned: 24 July 1953
- Decommissioned: 9 September 1968
- In service: 9 September 1968
- Out of service: 1 July 1971
- Reclassified: Coastal Minesweeper, 7 February 1955
- Stricken: 2 January 1975
- Identification: Hull symbol: AMS-121; Hull symbol: MSC-121
- Fate: Sold for scrap, September 1979

General characteristics
- Class & type: Bluebird-class minesweeper
- Displacement: 330 long tons (340 t)
- Length: 144 ft 3 in (43.97 m)
- Beam: 28 ft (8.5 m)
- Draft: 12 ft (3.7 m)
- Installed power: 4 × Packard 600 hp (450 kW) diesel engines; 2,400 hp (1,800 kW)
- Propulsion: 2 × screws
- Speed: 14 kn (26 km/h; 16 mph)
- Complement: 39
- Armament: 2 × 20 mm (0.8 in) Oerlikon cannons anti-aircraft (AA) mounts; 2 × caliber .50 in (12.7 mm) machine guns; 1 × 81 mm mortar

USS Bluebird (AMS/MSC-121) was a Bluebird-class minesweeper acquired by the United States Navy for clearing minefields in coastal waterways.

== Construction ==
The third Bluebird to be so named by the Navy, AMS-121 was laid down on 5 February 1952, at Vallejo, California, by the Mare Island Naval Shipyard; launched on 11 May 1953; sponsored by Mrs. G. C. Demmon; and commissioned on 24 July 1953.

== West Coast operations ==
The minesweeper operated out of San Diego, California, performing the usual tasks such as type training and fleet exercises. She also engaged in some experimental work.

== Transfer to the East Coast ==
On 5 May 1954, however, Bluebird stood out of San Diego bound for Charleston, South Carolina. She transited the Panama Canal on 19 May, and after a visit to Guantánamo Bay, Cuba, arrived in her new home port on 27 May. The minesweeper conducted normal training operations out of Charleston and in Chesapeake Bay for about a year.

== Reclassified coastal minesweeper ==
On 7 February 1955, Bluebird was reclassified a coastal minesweeper and redesignated MSC-121. During the summer and fall of 1955, she participated in two Bureau of Ships projects. The first tested the effects of underwater explosions on minesweeper hulls and equipment. The second consisted of an overall evaluation of the Bluebird-class minesweeper. Later that fall, she joined in LantPhibEx 1-55 off Onslow Beach, North Carolina. Early in 1956, she was based at Yorktown, Virginia, but soon thereafter returned to her old home port, Charleston.

== Participation in NATO exercises ==
Charleston remained her home port for more than 12 years. In addition to the usual single-ship drills and type training, the minesweeper participated in such exercises as the annual NATO "Sweep Clear" exercises and Atlantic Fleet amphibious exercises. She tested minesweeping gear for the Mine Defense Laboratory at Panama City, Florida, and served as a school ship for the Mine Warfare School.

== Earning the Armed Forces Expeditionary Medal ==
In January 1961, Bluebird began making regular periodic deployments to the West Indies serving under the auspices of the Commander, Fleet Training Group, Guantanamo Bay. It was on one of those deployments that, during the summer of 1965, she earned the Armed Forces Expeditionary Medal for her role in the American intervention to restore order in the volatile Dominican Republic.

== Home-based out of Florida ==
Those and similar operations continued to occupy her time until September 1968. On 5 September, she received orders changing her home port to Ft. Lauderdale, Florida. Bluebird departed Charleston that same day and reached her destination on 7 September. Two days later, she was placed out of commission, in service.

== Reassigned as a training ship ==
The minesweeper was assigned duty training naval reservists at Ft. Lauderdale. That service lasted until mid-May 1971, when she returned to Charleston to begin preparations for inactivation.

== Decommissioning ==
Bluebird was placed out of commission, in reserve, on 1 July 1971. That December, she was taken to Norfolk where she joined the Atlantic Reserve Fleet. On 2 January 1975, her name was struck from the Navy list. She was sold for scrap to Oskco Edwards, Capistrano, California, in September 1979. The details of her ultimate disposition are unknown.

== Bibliography ==
Online resources

- Mann, Raymond (25 June 2015). "Bluebird III (AMS-121)". Dictionary of American Naval Fighting Ships. Naval History and Heritage Command. This article incorporates text from this source, which is in the public domain.
- "USS Bluebird (MSC 121)". NavSource.
