= USS Redwing (AMS-200) =

Minesweeper of the United States Navy

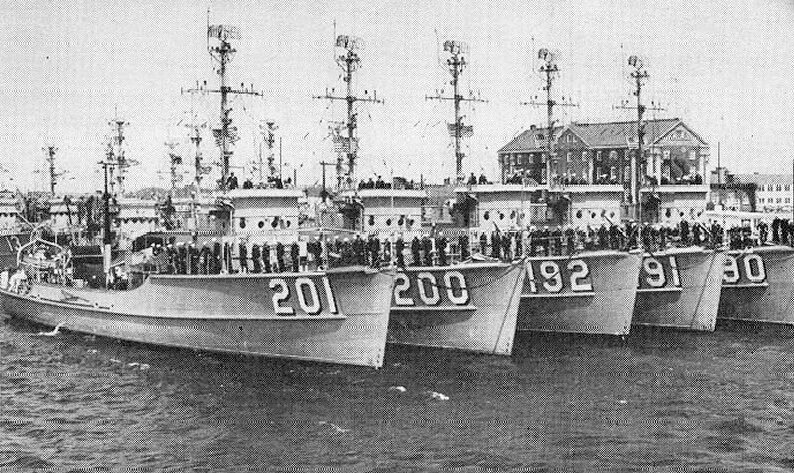
- Shrike (AMS-201), Redwing (MSC-200), Hummingbird (MSC-192), Frigate Bird (MSC-191), and Falcon (MS-190) at Charleston, South Carolina

History

United States
- Name: Redwing
- Namesake: Redwing
- Builder: Tampa Marine Company, Tampa, Florida
- Laid down: 1 July 1953
- Launched: 29 April 1954
- Commissioned: 7 January 1955
- Decommissioned: 16 June 1959
- Reclassified: Coastal Minesweeper, 7 February 1955
- Stricken: 18 June 1959
- Identification: Hull symbol: AMS-200; Hull symbol: MSC-200
- Fate: Transferred to the Spanish Navy

Spain
- Name: Sil
- Acquired: 18 June 1959
- Reclassified: Patrol Craft, late 1970s; Minesweeper, 1982
- Stricken: 25 September 2002
- Identification: Hull sumbol: M-29; Hull sumbol: PVZ-55; Hull sumbol: M-27; Code letters: EBJD (M27)
- Fate: Retired, 15 April 2003

General characteristics
- Class & type: Bluebird-class minesweeper
- Displacement: 335 long tons (340 t)
- Length: 144 ft (44 m)
- Beam: 28 ft (8.5 m)
- Draft: 8 ft 4 in (2.54 m)
- Installed power: 2 × General Motors 8-268A diesel engines; 880 horsepower (660 kW) each
- Propulsion: 2 × screws
- Speed: 14 kn (26 km/h; 16 mph)
- Armament: 2 × 20 mm (0.8 in) Oerlikon cannons anti-aircraft (AA) mounts

USS Redwing (AMS/MSC-200) was a Bluebird-class minesweeper in the United States Navy.

== Construction ==
Redwing was laid down 1 July 1953, by Tampa Marine Company, Tampa, Florida; launched 29 April 1954, as AMS-200; sponsored by Mrs. Courtney W. Campbell, wife of US Representative Campbell of Florida; and commissioned 7 January 1955.

== East Coast Assignment ==
Assigned to the Atlantic Fleet, Redwing arrived Charleston, South Carolina, 23 January 1955. Reclassified a coastal minesweeper, MSC-200 on 7 February, she underwent shakedown out of Key West, Florida, commencing 3 March. Returning via Mayport, Florida, to search for downed aircraft, she arrived Charleston, 20 April, and commenced minesweeping operations with various units of the Fleet.

Redwing arrived Panama City, Florida, 5 July, and provided services to the Mine Defense Laboratory through 9 September. She then joined Tonawanda for special development operations at Key West, before returning to Charleston, 22 September. Redwing continued to operate out of Charleston, until January 1957, participating in minesweeping and amphibious training exercises as far south as Guantánamo Bay, Cuba, and Vieques, Puerto Rico.

She departed Charleston, 16 January, to provide services for the Naval Mine Warfare School at Yorktown, Virginia, and to operate under the Amphibious Training Command, Little Creek, Virginia. She then conducted surveys in Boston Channel, beginning 3 October, followed by exercises along the New Jersey coast in January 1958.

Departing New York, 25 February, for exercises as far south as Key West, she returned to Boston, Massachusetts, 21 March, and for the next year provided services for the Destroyer Development Group in Narragansett Bay.

== Decommissioning ==
Redwing departed Boston, 26 February 1959, en route Norfolk, Virginia, for overhaul in preparation for transfer to Spain. Decommissioned at Norfolk 16 June 1959, she was struck from the Navy List and transferred to the Spanish Navy as Sil (M-29) effective 18 June 1959.

== Notes ==
Citations

== Bibliography ==
Online resources

- "Redwing II (AMS-200)". Dictionary of American Naval Fighting Ships. Naval History and Heritage Command. 27 August 2015. This article incorporates text from this source, which is in the public domain.
- "USS Redwing (MSC 200)". NavSource.
