= USS Jacana =

Minesweeper of the United States Navy

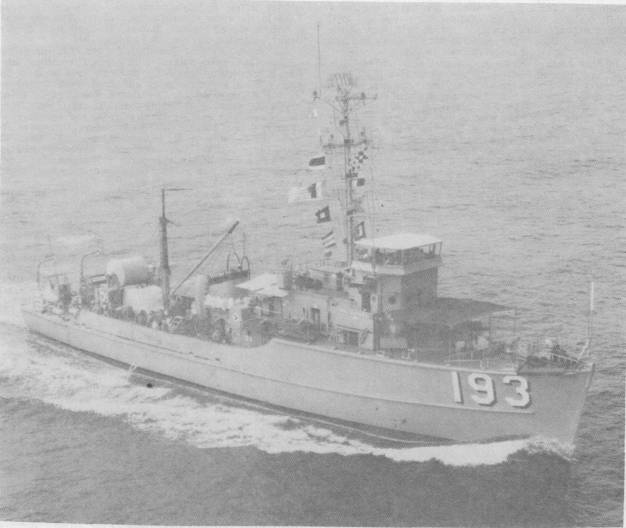
- USS Jacana (AMS-193) at Hampton Roads, Virginia, 23 July 1961.

History

United States
- Name: Jacana
- Builder: Quincy Adams Yacht Yard, Inc., Quincy, Massachusetts
- Laid down: 26 February 1954
- Launched: 25 February 1955
- Commissioned: 10 March 1955
- Reclassified: Coastal Minesweeper, 7 February 1955
- Stricken: 1 May 1976
- Identification: Hull symbol: AMS-193; Hull symbol: MSC-193
- Fate: Transferred to Indonesia, 1971

Indonesia
- Name: Pulau Aruan
- Acquired: 1971
- Identification: Hull symbol: M-718
- Fate: Sold for scrap, 1 September 1976

General characteristics
- Class & type: Bluebird-class minesweeper
- Displacement: 362 long tons (368 t)
- Length: 144 ft 3 in (43.97 m)
- Beam: 27 ft 2 in (8.28 m)
- Draft: 12 ft (3.7 m)
- Installed power: 4 × Packard 600 hp (450 kW) diesel engines; 2,400 hp (1,800 kW)
- Propulsion: 2 × screws
- Speed: 13.6 kn (25.2 km/h; 15.7 mph)
- Complement: 39
- Armament: 2 × 20 mm (0.8 in) Oerlikon cannons anti-aircraft (AA) mounts; 2 × caliber .50 in (12.7 mm) machine guns; 1 × 81 mm mortar

USS Jacana (AMS/MSC-193) was a Bluebird-class minesweeper acquired by the United States Navy for clearing coastal minefields.

== Construction ==
Jacana was laid down 25 February 1954, as AMS-193; reclassified MSC-193 on 7 February 1955; launched 25 February 1955, Quincy Adams Yacht Yard, Inc., Quincy, Massachusetts; sponsored by Mrs. Dorothy M. Deehan; and commissioned on 10 March 1955.

== East Coast operations ==
After shakedown, Jacana arrived at Charleston, South Carolina, her home port, on 28 May 1955; and, during the year, engaged in tactical training and experimental exercises part of the Navy's ceaseless activity to maintain a superior-readiness capability that incorporates every modern technological advance. The motor minesweeper arrived at her new home port, Yorktown, Virginia, on 18 January 1957, and commenced mine warfare exercises in the Chesapeake Bay.

In addition to participating in mine warfare operations, Jacana performed important search and rescue missions for downed aircraft and engaged in amphibious exercises off Onslow Beach, North Carolina.

Worthy of note is a disparity of Jacana's armament suite to that indicated for her class. Jacana's primary armament was her various minesweeping equipment. On her forecastle, Jacana had a WWII-vintage single barrel Oerlikon 20 mm cannon. Additionally, she had a supplemental group of small arms including a Browning Automatic Rifle (BAR), two .45 caliber Thompson sub-machine guns, four M1 Garand rifles, and seven Colt M1911 .45 caliber pistols, the single-action, semi-automatic military issue that had been in service since 1911. She did not have an 81 mm mortar or two .50 caliber machine guns.

In July 1960, Jacana proceeded to Eastport, Maine, for the 4th of July celebration. Upon return to her home port of Little Creek, Virginia, she performed in local operations with Mine Division 41 through December. In January 1961, Jacana proceeded to the Caribbean Sea and operated out of Guantánamo Bay, Cuba performing patrols of the Windward Passage between the East Coast of Cuba and the Dominican Republic returning to home port in April. At that time she was detached for a two-month overhaul in Portsmouth, Virginia.

After overhaul and degaussing, she operated out of Roosevelt Roads, Puerto Rico (PR) while participating in an Amphibious exercise on the West end of the island of Viegas, PR. She returned to home port and participated in the annual Battle Efficiency "E" Award competition. Jacana won the award for LantFleet Coastal Minesweepers, as well as the Communications Green "C" Award and the Minesweeping "M" award that year.

In September 1961, Jacana departed Little Creek for a continuation of cyclic (three month rotations) Windward Passage Patrols to track and photograph soviet shipping into Cuba. She ran into a Category 4 hurricane, Hurricane Esther, off the coast of North Carolina East of Cape Hatteras. Jacana sustained significant superficial damage, losing the starboard strafing rail and most of the brass bow hull plating, which served to prevent anchor damage to the wooden hull, and was drydocked for repairs upon arrival in Guantanamo Bay. While on patrol in the Windward Passage, Jacana was once again tested with another storm, 1961 Atlantic hurricane season#Tropical Storm Gerda, whereby Jacana left her patrol and proceeded Westbound along the South coast of Cuba directly into the winds of the storm. Jacana made virtually no progress after "steaming" at maximum speed for several hours, but sustained minimal damage from the 70 mph (110 km/h) winds. Jacana returned to resume the patrol and completed it without further incident.

At some point during Jacana's Cuban patrols, Fidel Castro had threatened to attack Radio Swan on Swan Island and destroy a Radio Americas facility that was broadcasting anti-communist propaganda into Cuba 24/7, she was dispatched to defend the 'American owned' facility and its 'citizen' (black ops) personnel.

On 28 April 1962, Jacana proceeded to Port Everglades, Florida, for duty with the Naval Ordnance Laboratory Test Facility. After her mine evaluating mission was completed, she continued with the last of her Windward Passage assignments. Jacana completed what was to be her final Windward Passage patrol and returned to home port in July 1962. Jacana sailed for Halifax late September to participate in joint American-Canadian maneuvers. Soon after this exercise, the Cuban Missile Crisis brought a showdown with communism. Jacana remained on alert through November.

From 1963 to 1967 Jacana operated along the Atlantic Ocean coast, engaging in mine exercises, amphibious training, search and rescue operations, and duty with the Naval Mine Defense Laboratory in Florida.

== Decommissioning ==
Jacana was transferred to Indonesia in 1971, and renamed Pulau Aruan (M-718). She was struck from the US Naval Register, 1 May 1976 and sold, 1 September 1976. Fate: unknown.

== Notes ==
Citations

== Bibliography ==
Online resources

- "Jacana". Dictionary of American Naval Fighting Ships. Naval History and Heritage Command. 22 July 2015. This article incorporates text from this source, which is in the public domain.
- "USS Jacana (MSC-193)". NavSource.
