= USS Shrike (MSC-201) =

Minesweeper of the United States Navy

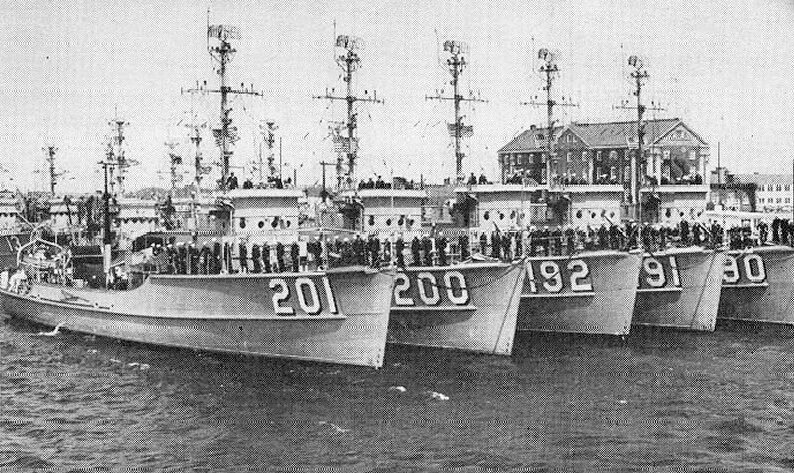
- Shrike (AMS-201), Redwing (MSC-200), Hummingbird (MSC-192), Frigate Bird (MSC-191), and Falcon (MS-190) at Charleston, South Carolina

History

United States
- Name: Shrike
- Namesake: Shrike
- Builder: Tampa Marine Company, Tampa, Florida
- Laid down: 1 September 1953
- Launched: 21 July 1954
- Commissioned: 21 March 1955
- Decommissioned: 27 September 1968
- Reclassified: Coastal Minesweeper, 7 February 1955
- Stricken: 1 July 1975
- Identification: Hull symbol: AMS-201; Hull symbol: MSC-201
- Fate: Scrapped, April 1978

General characteristics
- Class & type: Bluebird-class minesweeper
- Displacement: 412 long tons (419 t)
- Length: 144 ft (44 m)
- Beam: 28 ft (8.5 m)
- Draft: 12 ft (3.7 m)
- Installed power: 2 × General Motors diesel engines
- Propulsion: 2 × screws
- Speed: 12.8 kn (23.7 km/h; 14.7 mph)
- Complement: 40
- Armament: 2 × 20 mm (0.8 in) Oerlikon cannons anti-aircraft (AA) mounts; 2 × caliber .50 in (12.7 mm) machine guns; 1 × 81 mm mortar

USS Shrike (AMS/MSC-201) was a Bluebird-class minesweeper acquired by the US Navy for clearing coastal minefields.

== Construction ==
Shrike was laid down on 1 September 1953, Tampa Marine Company, Tampa, Florida; launched on 21 July 1954, as AMS-201; sponsored by Mrs. A. John Miller; reclassified a coastal minesweeper, MSC-201 on 7 February; and commissioned on 21 March 1955.

== East Coast operations ==
Shrike sailed from Tampa on 2 April, for Charleston, South Carolina, arriving there on 5 April. From 15 May to 24 June, she conducted shakedown training at Key West, Florida. She returned to Charleston on 26 June. For the remainder of the year, the minesweeper operated between Charleston and Key West as a unit of Mine Squadron 4. Shrike was assigned to the Mine Force, Atlantic Fleet, and the operational control of Commander, Operational Test and Evaluation Force, Atlantic Fleet, with her homeport at Key West.

== Supporting missile testing and search and rescue ==
The minesweeper operated out of that port until 30 June 1965. During these years, the ship conducted local operations, conducted experiments with new equipment, evaluated new type mines, and provided services for the missile testing facility at Cape Canaveral Air Force Station. In November 1963, her evaluation testing was interrupted when she was deployed to locate and assist in the salvage of a downed U-2 aircraft in Florida Bay.

== Reassigned as minesweeper ==
On 30 June 1965, Shrike's homeport was changed to Charleston; she was assigned to Mine Division 42, and her status was changed from an experimental ship to a sweeper in the mine force. She conducted operations from Charleston for the next three years which took her as far north as Newport, Rhode Island, as far south as the Caribbean, and one trip to New Orleans, Louisiana.

== Service as a training ship ==
On 27 September 1968, Shrike was decommissioned at Wilmington, North Carolina, and became a US Naval Reserve training ship for the 6th Naval District.

== Decommissioning ==
Shrike was struck from the Naval Register, 1 July 1975, and scrapped, April 1978. Fate: unknown.

== Notes ==
Citations

== Bibliography ==
Online resources

- "Shrike". Dictionary of American Naval Fighting Ships. Naval History and Heritage Command. 9 September 2015. This article incorporates text from this source, which is in the public domain.
- "USS Shrike (MSC 201)". NavSource.
