= USS Thrasher (AMS-203) =

Minesweeper of the United States Navy

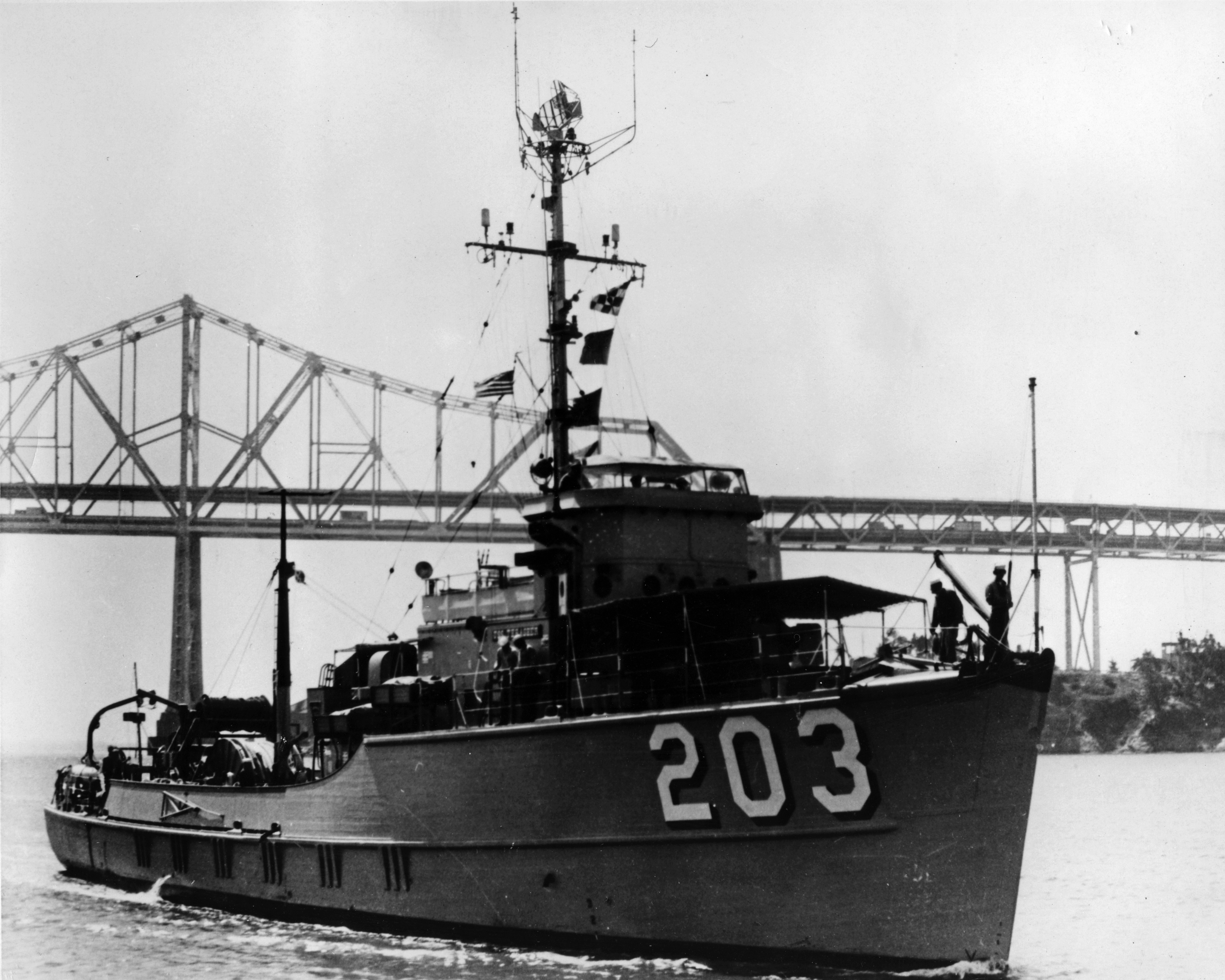
- USS Thrasher off Naval Station Treasure Island in March 1962.

History

United States
- Name: Thrasher
- Namesake: Thrasher
- Builder: Tampa Marine Company, Tampa, Florida
- Laid down: 1 April 1954
- Launched: 6 October 1954
- Commissioned: 16 August 1955
- Decommissioned: 1 August 1961
- In service: 1 August 1961
- Out of service: 1 May 1975
- Reclassified: Coastal Minesweeper, 7 February 1955
- Stricken: 1 July 1975
- Identification: Hull symbol: AMS-203; Hull symbol: MSC-203
- Fate: Transferred to Singapore, 1 December 1975

Singapore
- Name: Mercury
- Acquired: 1 December 1975
- Commissioned: December 1975
- Decommissioned: 31 March 1993
- Identification: Hull number: M-102
- Fate: Scrapped, 1995

General characteristics
- Class & type: Bluebird-class minesweeper
- Displacement: 320 long tons (330 t)
- Length: 144 ft (44 m)
- Beam: 28 ft (8.5 m)
- Draft: 9 ft 4 in (2.84 m)
- Installed power: 2 × General Motors 880 horsepower (660 kW) 8-268A diesel engines; 1,760 horsepower (1,310 kW)
- Propulsion: Snow and Knobstedt single reduction gear; 2 × screws
- Speed: 13 kn (24 km/h; 15 mph)
- Complement: 39
- Armament: 2 × 20 mm (0.8 in) Oerlikon cannons anti-aircraft (AA) mounts

USS Thrasher (AMS/MSC-203) was a Bluebird-class minesweeper acquired by the US Navy for clearing coastal minefields.

== Construction ==
Thrasher was laid down 1 April 1954, by Tampa Marine Company, Tampa, Florida; launched on 6 October 1954, as AMS-203; sponsored by Mrs. Fred T. Henke; reclassified as MSC-203, on 7 February 1955; and commissioned on 14 June 1955.

== East Coast operations ==
Two weeks later, Thrasher steamed for Charleston, South Carolina, her home port, to join Mine Force, Atlantic Fleet. But for a visit to Havana, Cuba, the wooden-hulled nonmagnetic coastal minesweeper spent the remainder of 1955, operating in South Carolina and Florida waters. She assumed duties as an active element of Mine Force, Atlantic, on the last day of the year; and, on New Year's Day 1956, her home port was changed to Yorktown, Virginia. The minesweeper's duties there included search and rescue missions for aircraft downed off the Virginia coast.

== West Coast operations ==
Assigned to the Experimental Mine Warfare School at Key West in 1957, the coastal minesweeper operated off the east coast and in the Caribbean until 7 February 1958, when she departed Key West and steamed via the Panama Canal and Manzanillo, Mexico, to the California coast, arriving at San Diego on 28 February. Assigned for a time to Scripps Institute of Oceanography, Thrasher surveyed ocean currents off Monterey in March. That summer, she cooperated with Warner Brothers during the shooting of the film "Up Periscope", and then returned to her primary duty plying California's coastal waters as a minesweeper with the San Diego Harbor Defense Command. In the fall, she trained sailors of the Turkish Navy and later, when the Turkish Navy received a minesweeper from the United States under the Mutual Aid for Defense Program, continued to lend assistance during shakedown.

Early in 1959, Thrasher joined Fleet Training Group, San Diego, for underway exercises. In April, she moved north to Seattle to conduct tests on the new "MM-1" automatic degaussing system; then returned to southern California for annual minesweeping exercises conducted out of Long Beach. On 8 May 1959, Thrasher departed San Diego and steamed independently to Hawaii for additional tests of the new degaussing system which had been designed to compensate for changes in latitude and longitude. After successfully completing the tests, she returned to San Diego on 6 June, and, later in the summer, provided assistance in channel conditioning to the harbor defense unit at San Francisco. In the fall, she acted as an observation ship for aerial minelaying operations conducted by Fleet Air Wing 14 off San Diego and conducted additional tests of the new degaussing system. In December 1959, Thrasher was transferred to the 12th Naval District and assigned a new home port of San Francisco for duty with that port's harbor defense unit.

She took up her new duties in January, and, in February, acted as target ship for Mero despite heavy seas which rolled the minesweeper up to 50 degrees. After work on her degaussing system and installation of "Shoran" at the Hunter's Point Naval Shipyard, Thrasher participated in minesweeping exercises out of Long Beach, earning a letter of commendation from Commander Mine Force, Pacific Fleet, for her performance. Late in the fall, she helped to salvage and refloat YW-91 which had run aground at Santa Rosa Island. In this operation, Thrasher earned another letter of commendation.

== Decommissioning – Reserve ship ==
The minesweeper continued assignments off the west coast until she was decommissioned on 1 August 1961. Placed in service as a reserve training ship for the 12th Naval District, she operated in that capacity for the next 14 years, conducting weekend training cruises and occasional fortnight refresher training cruises for her selected reserve crew. During that time, she visited various California and Mexican ports. In the summers of 1966 and 1967, she joined Ruff and Cormorant to form naval reserve Mine Division 13 for exercises, including a month of operations in 1967, off the coasts of Washington and Canada. That same year, Thrasher increased her number of reserve crews from one to two and stepped up her training activities correspondingly. In 1973, she made another summer cruise to northern ports, calling at ports in Oregon, Washington, and British Columbia.

== Inactivation ==
In March 1975, she made her last reserve training cruise, conducting minesweeping exercises in Monterey Bay before returning to San Francisco. Towed to the inactive ship facility at Mare Island on 1 May 1975, she was inactivated and her name struck from the Navy list on 1 July.

== Transfer to Singapore ==
On 1 December 1975, she was sold to the Republic of Singapore, renamed Mercury (M-102). Until 31 March 1993, when she was decommissioned, she served in the Republic of Singapore Navy. She was discarded in 1995.

== Bibliography ==
- "Thrasher II (MSC-203)". Dictionary of American Naval Fighting Ships. Naval History and Heritage Command. 29 September 2015. This article incorporates text from this source, which is in the public domain.
- "USS Thrasher (MSC 203)". NavSource.
