= USS Cormorant (AMS-122) =

Minesweeper of the United States Navy

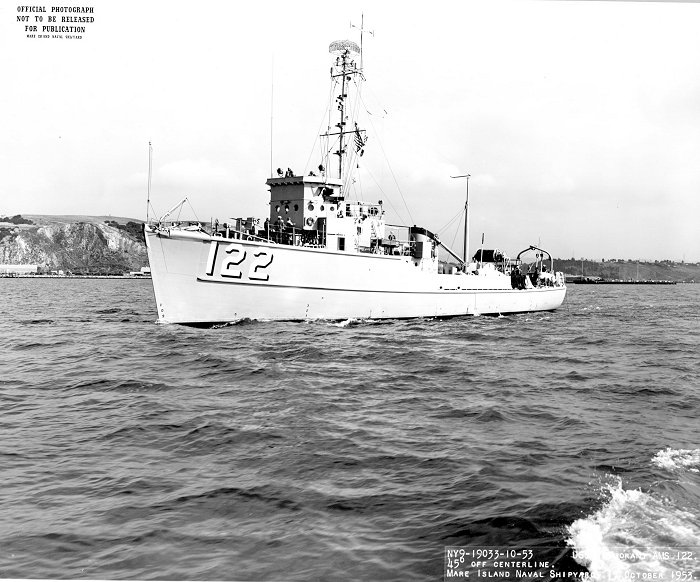
- USS Cormorant (AMS-122), off Mare Island, 13 October 1953.

History

United States
- Name: Cormorant
- Namesake: Cormorant
- Builder: Mare Island Naval Shipyard, Vallejo, California
- Laid down: 5 February 1952
- Launched: 8 June 1953
- Commissioned: 14 August 1953
- Reclassified: Coastal Minesweeper, 7 February 1955
- Stricken: 15 March 1974
- Identification: Hull symbol: AMS-122; Hull symbol: MSC-122
- Fate: Sold for scrap, 1 December 1974

General characteristics
- Class & type: Bluebird-class minesweeper
- Displacement: 330 long tons (340 t)
- Length: 144 ft (44 m)
- Beam: 28 ft (8.5 m)
- Draft: 12 ft (3.7 m)
- Installed power: 4 × Packard 600 hp (450 kW) diesel engines; 2,400 hp (1,800 kW)
- Propulsion: 2 × screws
- Speed: 13 kn (24 km/h; 15 mph)
- Complement: 39
- Armament: 2 × 20 mm (0.8 in) Oerlikon cannons anti-aircraft (AA) mounts; 2 × caliber .50 in (12.7 mm) machine guns; 1 × 81 mm mortar

USS Cormorant (AMS-122/MSC-122) was a Bluebird-class minesweeper in the United States Navy.

== Construction ==
Cormorant was laid down 5 February 1952, as AMS-122; launched 8 June 1953, by Mare Island Naval Shipyard, Vallejo, California; sponsored by Mrs. I. H. Whitthorne; and commissioned 14 August 1953. She was reclassified MSC-122, 7 February 1955.

== East Coast Activity ==
For the rest of the year Cormorant conducted minesweeping, sonar school, and other operations on the West Coast except for a brief cruise to Pearl Harbor for duty with the Naval Reserve Training Center.

== Pacific Ocean operations ==
Sailing to the Far East, Cormorant arrived at her new home port Sasebo 22 February. She remained in the western Pacific conducting minesweeping exercises in Korean and Japanese waters and voyaging to Formosa, Okinawa, and the Philippines for training through 1960.

Cormorant's final homeport was Everett, Washington, where she served as a Reserve training ship.

== Decommissioning ==
Cormorant was decommissioned at Everett, Washington in 1970. She was struck from the Naval Register 15 March 1974. She was disposed of 1 December 1974, through the Defense Reutilization and Marketing Service for scrap.

== Notes ==
Citations

== Bibliography ==
Online resources

- "Cormorant II (AMS-122)". Dictionary of American Naval Fighting Ships. Naval History and Heritage Command. 6 July 2015. This article incorporates text from this source, which is in the public domain.
- "USS Cormorant (MSC 122)". NavSource.
