= USS Gannet (MSC-290) =

Minesweeper of the United States Navy

History

United States
- Name: USS Gannet
- Builder: Tacoma Boatbuilding Company, Inc., Tacoma, Washington
- Laid down: 1 May 1959
- Launched: 2 May 1960
- Commissioned: 14 July 1961
- Decommissioned: 1970
- Stricken: 1970
- Fate: Scrapped, 1970

General characteristics
- Class & type: Albatross-class coastal minesweeper
- Displacement: 378 long tons (384 t)
- Length: 145 ft 5 in (44.32 m)
- Beam: 27 ft 3 in (8.31 m)
- Draft: 8 ft 6 in (2.59 m)
- Propulsion: 2 × 1,000 shp (746 kW) Harnischfeger diesel engines, two shafts.
- Speed: 13 knots (24 km/h; 15 mph)
- Complement: 37
- Armament: 2 × .50 cal (12.7 mm) machine guns; 1 × 81 mm mortar

USS Gannet (MSC-290) was an Albatross-class coastal minesweeper of the United States Navy. Laid down on 1 May 1959 by the Tacoma Boatbuilding Co., Inc., Tacoma, Washington, the ship was launched on 2 May 1960, sponsored by Mrs. Frank P. Luongo, Jr.; and commissioned in the Puget Sound Naval Shipyard on 14 July 1961.

== Pacific Ocean operations ==
After shakedown, Gannet departed Puget Sound on 4 August 1961 and arrived Long Beach, California, on 9 August. As a unit of Mine Division 92, she operated off southern California and conducted exercises in mine countermeasures. During the first two weeks in June 1962 she participated in Joint Task Force 8 nuclear tests off the California coast. Local operations out of Long Beach, California, continued until 2 July when she departed for Japan via Pearl Harbor, Midway, and Guam, arriving Sasebo on 13 August.

After type training off the Japanese coast with Mine Division 32, she departed Sasebo on 1 October for Chinhae, Korea, where she joined in mine force exercises with units of the Republic of Korea Navy. After returning to Sasebo on 7 October, she steamed to Okinawa, Hong Kong, and Taiwan before returning to Japan early in November for additional type training that included school ship service out of Yokosuka, Japan.

== Vietnam Area operations ==
During the next two years, Gannet continued operations out of Sasebo. Mine warfare exercises and training in mine countermeasures sent her to Korea, Okinawa, Taiwan, Hong Kong, and the Philippines. During July and August 1964 she performed special mine countermeasure operations in the South China Sea while supporting U.S. naval operations along the coast of Vietnam. She returned to the South China Sea in February 1965; participated in a joint amphibious exercise with ships of the Royal Thai Navy; then steamed to the Vietnamese coast in mid-April to resume special duty.

Gannet returned to Sasebo on 24 May 1965 and for more than six months operated along the coast of Japan. Early in December she returned to the coast of Vietnam, where she joined "Operation Market Time" as a coastal surveillance patrol ship. During her patrols she inspected hundreds of Vietnamese fishing boats in an effort to control the infiltration of Viet Cong troops and supplies. In addition, she provided treatment for South Vietnamese fishermen requiring medical aid. She departed Vietnam on 14 January 1966 and returned to Sasebo the 29th.

She served along the Japanese coast until 10 April 1966 when she again sailed for South Vietnam, arriving 10 days later to resume "Market Time" patrols. During the remainder of the year, Gannet made three patrol and surveillance deployments along the Vietnamese coast. In addition she participated in SEATO minesweeping exercises in the Gulf of Thailand.

Mid May 1967 she was relieved from patrol duties and sent up the Mekong river. Tying up at Vinh Long for the night. She crossed the Tien Giang to the Bassac river and operated in the Can Tho area. She was testing the ship's sensitive sweep sonar on swimmers-sappers floating the river. The ship's crew floated and swam the river to test the viability of identifying swimmers from the rest of flotsam. The swim crew drew sniper fire for several days until a gun ship (Puff) was called in to remove the problem. The end of May seen the ship headed up the Bassac, across the Tien Giang and back down the Mekong to Vinh Long and eventually to Vung Tau harbor. Returned to the assigned patrol area. The water in the ship's fresh water tanks was muddy for the next several months from the water the ship took on at Binh Thuy.

In December 1969 the Gannet received the record breaking grade of 95.2 at refresher training in Yoko. This grade is the highest ever received by a U. S. Navy Ship at FLTRAGRU WESTPAC.

The Gannet's last combat patrol was January 21 to February 2, 1970. While conducting harassment and interdiction missions against targets on Honhfo Peninsula Gannet received hostile fire on 3 occasions. A total of 11 B-40 rockets and numerous small arms fire was received . Based on this justification all personnel serving aboard USS Gannet during the period January 26 to February 2, 1970 were authorized to wear the combat action ribbon. At the completion of this patrol the Gannet's gun crew had fired over 1200 rounds of 81MM and 13,000 rounds of 50 cal.

== Decommissioning ==
Gannet was struck from the Naval Vessel Register in 1970. She was decommissioned in Sasebo, Japan on April 17, 1970. After decommissioning, the Gannet was dismantled.
