= USS Spoonbill =

Minesweeper of the United States Navy

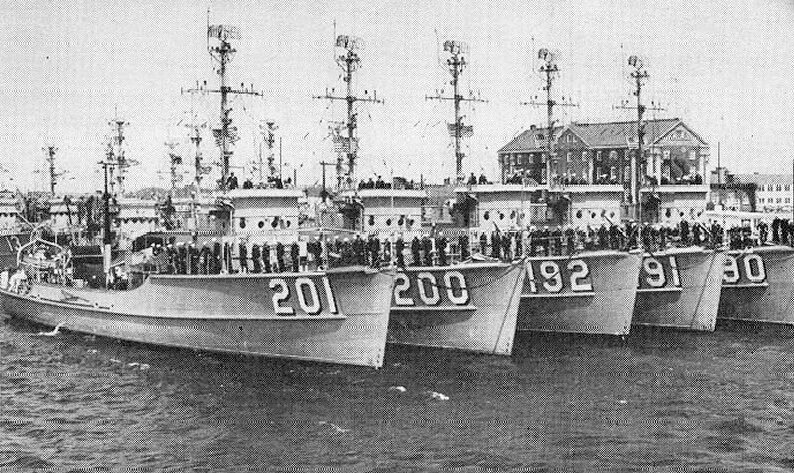
- Bluebird-class minesweepers at Charleston, South Carolina in 1956

History

United States
- Name: Spoonbill
- Namesake: Spoonbill
- Builder: Tampa Marine Company, Tampa, Florida
- Laid down: 2 November 1953
- Launched: 3 August 1954
- Commissioned: 14 June 1955
- Decommissioned: 16 June 1959
- Reclassified: Coastal Minesweeper, 7 February 1955
- Stricken: 16 June 1959
- Identification: Hull symbol: AMS-202; Hull symbol: MSC-202
- Fate: Transferred to the Spanish Navy, 1 July 1959

Spain
- Name: Duero
- Acquired: 1 July 1959
- Reclassified: Minesweeper, 1980
- Stricken: 16 December 1999
- Identification: Hull sumbol: M-28; Hull sumbol: M-23; Code letters: EBJB
- Fate: unknown

General characteristics
- Class & type: Bluebird-class minesweeper
- Displacement: 335 long tons (340 t)
- Length: 144 ft (44 m)
- Beam: 28 ft (8.5 m)
- Draft: 8 ft 4 in (2.54 m)
- Installed power: 2 × General Motors 8-268A diesel engines; 880 horsepower (660 kW) each
- Propulsion: 2 × screws
- Speed: 14 kn (26 km/h; 16 mph)
- Complement: 39
- Armament: 2 × 20 mm (0.8 in) Oerlikon cannons anti-aircraft (AA) mounts

USS Spoonbill (AMS/MSC-202) was a Bluebird-class minesweeper acquired by the US Navy for clearing coastal minefields.

== Construction ==
Spoonbill was laid down 2 November 1953, by Tampa Marine Company, Tampa, Florida; launched on 3 August 1954, as AMS-202; sponsored by Mrs. A. N. Springer; redesignated as MSC-202 on 7 February 1955; and commissioned on 14 June 1955.

== East Coast operations ==
Spoonbill was among the first in a group of non-magnetic minesweepers of wooden construction capable of sweeping any conventional type mine constructed at the time. On 4 July 1955, she was assigned to United States Mine Force, Atlantic Fleet, Charleston, South Carolina. After shakedown training off Key West, Florida, from 26 July to 24 August, and post-shakedown availability at Rawles Brothers' Shipyard, Jacksonville, Florida, Spoonbill returned to Charleston.

== Schoolship assignment ==
She steamed from Charleston on 3 February 1956, for Yorktown, Virginia, where she was assigned duty with the Naval Mine Warfare School, embarking students for daily cruises to participate in minesweeping operations and training with fleet units.

The ship sailed for Argentia, Newfoundland, on 8 January 1957, and participated in fleet exercises from 15 January to 7 February, when she returned to Charleston. Spoonbill operated from there until 4 February 1958, when she got underway for the US West Coast. The minesweeper transited the Panama Canal on 11 February, and arrived at San Diego, California, on 28 February. She moved up the coast to Treasure Island, California, and conducted operations from there until 2 February 1959.

== Decommissioning ==
Ordered back to the US East Coast, Spoonbill arrived at Norfolk on 9 March, to enter the navy yard for an overhaul in preparation for transfer to Spain. Spoonbill was struck from the Navy List on 16 June 1959, and transferred to Spain on 1 July, under the Military Assistance Program. She served the Spanish Navy as Duero (M-28). Duero was struck from the Spanish Navy List, 16 December 1999. Fate: unknown.

== Notes ==
Citations

== Bibliography ==
Online resources

- "Spoonbill". Dictionary of American Naval Fighting Ships. Naval History and Heritage Command. 15 September 2015. This article incorporates text from this source, which is in the public domain.
- "USS Spoonbill (MSC 202)". NavSource.
