= Dorchester, New Jersey =

Populated place in Cumberland County, New Jersey, US

- Census-designated place
- Location in Cumberland County Location in New Jersey Location in the United States
- Coordinates: 39°16′22″N 74°58′37″W
- Country: United States
- State: New Jersey
- County: Cumberland
- Township: Maurice River

Area
  - Total: 0.52 sq mi (1.34 km^{2})
  - Land: 0.49 sq mi (1.27 km^{2})
  - Water: 0.031 sq mi (0.08 km^{2})
- Elevation: 9.8 ft (3 m)

Population (2020)
  - Total: 291
  - Density: 594.5/sq mi (229.55/km^{2})
- ZIP Code: 08316
- FIPS code: 34-18010
- GNIS feature ID: 0875946

Dorchester is an unincorporated community located within Maurice River Township, in Cumberland County, in the U.S. state of New Jersey. The area is served as United States Postal Service ZIP Code 08316.

As of the 2020 census, Dorchester had a population of 291.

Shipbuilding has always been the principal industry in Dorchester, and the A.J. Meerwald, the state ship of New Jersey, was built here.

== Demographics ==
Historical population
Census	Pop.	Note	%±
2020	291		—
U.S. Decennial Census

Dorchester first appeared as a census designated place in the 2020 U.S. census.

Dorchester CDP, New Jersey – Racial and ethnic composition Note: the US Census treats Hispanic/Latino as an ethnic category. This table excludes Latinos from the racial categories and assigns them to a separate category. Hispanics/Latinos may be of any race.
Race / Ethnicity (NH = Non-Hispanic)	Pop 2020	2020
White alone (NH)	229	78.69%
Black or African American alone (NH)	9	3.09%
Native American or Alaska Native alone (NH)	0	0.00%
Asian alone (NH)	0	0.00%
Native Hawaiian or Pacific Islander alone (NH)	0	0.00%
Other race alone (NH)	0	0.00%
Mixed race or Multiracial (NH)	23	7.90%
Hispanic or Latino (any race)	30	10.31%
Total	291	100.00%

As of 2020, the population of the area was 291.

== History ==
It is said that it was in Dorchester where the Dutch ship Prince Maurice sank, giving the Maurice River and Maurice River Township its name.

== Education ==
Students are zoned to Maurice River Township School District.
