= USS Meadowlark =

Minesweeper of the United States Navy

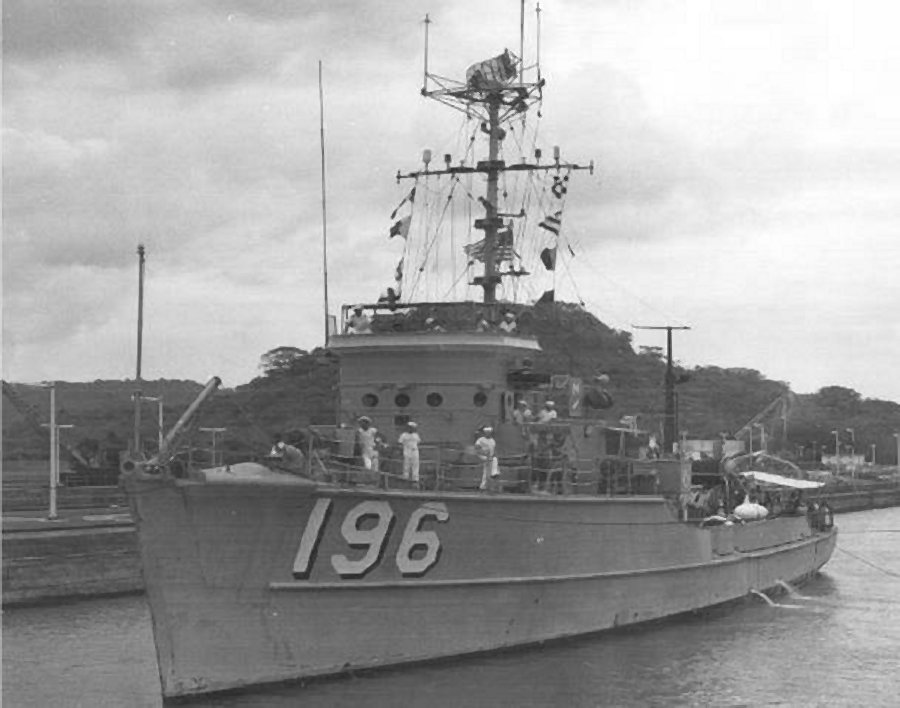
- USS Meadowlark (AMS-196), c. 1961, transiting the Panama Canal.

History

United States
- Name: Meadowlark
- Namesake: Meadowlark
- Builder: Broward Marine, Inc., Fort Lauderdale, Florida
- Laid down: 18 May 1953
- Launched: 28 August 1954
- Commissioned: 14 May 1955
- Reclassified: Coastal Minesweeper, 7 February 1955
- Stricken: 1 May 1976
- Identification: Hull symbol: AMS-195; Hull symbol: MSC-195
- Fate: Transferred to Indonesia, 1971

Indonesia
- Name: Pulau Alau
- Acquired: 1971
- Identification: Hull symbol: M-717
- Fate: Sold for scrap, 1 September 1976

General characteristics
- Class & type: Bluebird-class minesweeper
- Displacement: 362 long tons (368 t)
- Length: 144 ft 3 in (43.97 m)
- Beam: 27 ft 2 in (8.28 m)
- Draft: 12 ft (3.7 m)
- Installed power: 4 × Packard 600 hp (450 kW) diesel engines; 2,400 hp (1,800 kW)
- Propulsion: 2 × screws
- Speed: 13.6 kn (25.2 km/h; 15.7 mph)
- Complement: 40
- Armament: 2 × twin 20 mm (0.8 in) Oerlikon cannons anti-aircraft (AA) mounts; 2 × caliber .50 in (12.7 mm) machine guns; 1 × 81 mm mortar

USS Meadowlark (AMS/MSC-196) was a Bluebird-class minesweeper acquired by the United States Navy for clearing coastal minefields.

== Construction ==
Meadowlark was laid down on 18 May 1953, as AMS-196, by Broward Marine, Inc., Fort Lauderdale, Florida; launched on 28 August 1954, sponsored by Mrs. Thomas E. Sheridan; reclassified MSC-196 on 7 February 1955; and commissioned on 10 May 1955.

== East Coast operations ==
Meadowlark conducted shakedown training out of Charleston, South Carolina. This remained her home port into 1969, except for a period commencing February 1956, when assigned to the Naval Mine Warfare School, Yorktown, Virginia. She conducted operations from Nova Scotia to the Panama Canal Zone, and in January 1967, visited Curaçao, Netherlands West Indies. With Mine Squadron 42 she twice participated in joint exercises with the Royal Canadian Navy the first time off Nova Scotia in July 1958, and again in June 1963, along the Florida coast.

== Military awards and honors ==
An eager competitor in fleet exercises and battle problems, Meadowlark was recognized for her operational readiness. From 1962, she won five consecutive Battle Efficiency "E" Awards and accumulated an equal number of awards for excellence in mine counter measures.

== Decommissioning ==
Meadowlark was transferred to Indonesia in 1971, and renamed Pulau Alau (M-717); struck from the Naval Vessel Register on 1 May 1976; and, sold, 1 September 1976. Fate: unknown.

== Notes ==
Citations

== Bibliography ==
Online resources

- "Meadowlark". Dictionary of American Naval Fighting Ships. Naval History and Heritage Command. 7 August 2015. This article incorporates text from this source, which is in the public domain.
- "USS Meadowlark (MSC-196)". NavSource.
