= DLA Disposition Services =

Part of U.S. Defense Logistics Agency

DLA Disposition Services (formerly known as the Defense Reutilization and Marketing Service) is part of the United States Defense Logistics Agency. Headquartered at the Hart–Dole–Inouye Federal Center in Battle Creek, Michigan, the organization provides personnel to support the US military in 16 overseas deployments, including Iraq and Afghanistan, 2 US territories (Guam and Puerto Rico) and 41 states.

== History ==
A congressional report in 1972 recommended centralizing the disposal of United States Department of Defense (DoD) property for better accountability. In response, on September 12, 1972, the Defense Supply Agency (now known as the Defense Logistics Agency) established the Defense Property Disposal Service (renamed the Defense Reutilization and Marketing Service in 1985) in Battle Creek, Michigan, as a primary-level field activity. On July 19, 2010, as part of a "We Are DLA" initiative, the Defense Reutilization and Marketing Service was renamed the Defense Logistics Agency Disposition Services.

== Functions ==
DLA Disposition Services disposes of the military's excess property. It does this through:

- reutilization within the DoD
- transfer to other federal agencies
- donation to state and local governments

Excess materiel may also be used for:

- emergency management in the US
- humanitarian aid worldwide
- foreign military sales programs

Excess property that is not disposed of in these ways may be subsequently offered for sale to the public.

DLA Disposition Services is also responsible for the management and disposal of hazardous property for DoD activities, maximizing the use of each item and minimizing environmental risks and costs, and retains a legal responsibility for DoD waste even after it has been passed on to private contractors.

== Iraq waste controversy ==
DLA Disposition Services has a legal responsibility for US military waste even after it has been passed on to private contractors. In 2010 an investigation by The Times newspaper in five Iraqi provinces discovered that hazardous waste from US bases was being dumped locally by subcontracted waste firms rather than transported back to the US by ship via the Iraqi port of Umm Qasr or recycled in purpose built facilities in northern and western Iraq, as required by DoD rules. Major General Kendall P. Cox Sr., responsible for engineering and infrastructure in Iraq, said: "As you know we have been here for over seven years. In that period we have accumulated several million pounds of hazardous waste… I think perhaps the lesson is that we create hazardous waste treatment centers earlier if there is a potential for us to have a long-term presence." Brigadier General Stephen R. Lanza, the US military spokesman in Iraq, said: "We take this issue very seriously and want to solve the problem. There is a variety of ways in which this [dumping] could have happened. We are now putting a system into place. There is a lot of catching up to do... Those responsible for this will be punished. It is something that once brought to our attention, we take very seriously."

The owner of one Iraqi company involved in the disposal of US military waste said: "The Americans properly separate the hazardous material from the plastic and scrap metal, and then pass it on to Kuwaiti and Lebanese companies. Some of the companies then mix it back together and pass it on to Iraqi companies. That's how they get rid of things. It is not our fault at all."

== Excess Property Program ==
The DoD Excess Property Program (1033 program, formerly the 1208 program) is a Defense Logistics Agency program to transfer leftover military materiel (supplies and equipment) to U.S. state and local civilian law enforcement agencies. The surplus equipment includes grenade launchers, helicopters, military robots, M-16 service rifles, armored vehicles, riverboats, Battle Dress Uniform clothing, and information technology equipment.

In 2011, the program resulted in the DoD giving away nearly $500 million worth of equipment, while in 2010, $212 million in gear were distributed.

The 1033 program has been linked with perceived militarization of US law enforcement agencies and local police, especially following riots and the police response in the aftermath of the shooting of Michael Brown in Ferguson, Missouri.
