= USS Warbler (MSC-206) =

Minesweeper of the United States Navy

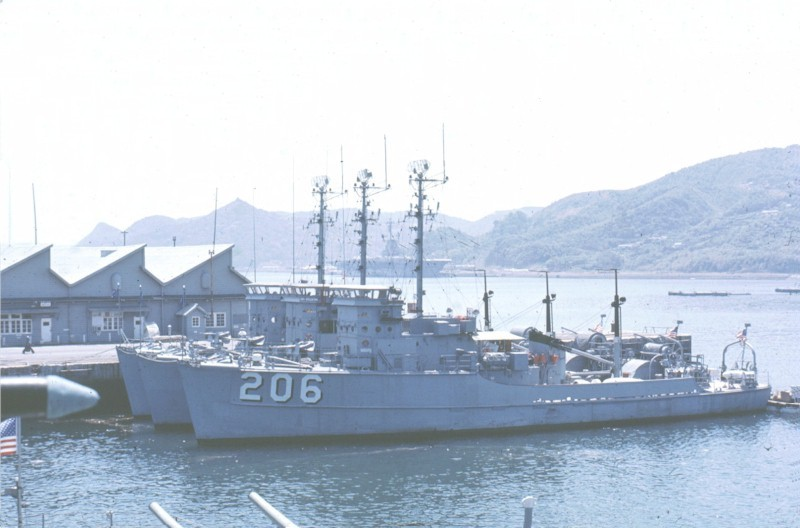
- Three US Bluebird-class minesweepers at Yokosoka Naval Base, Japan, in March 1967. The one nearest to the camera is USS Warbler (MSC-206). The Essex-class aircraft carrier Hancock is visible in the distant background.

History

United States
- Name: Warbler
- Namesake: Warbler
- Builder: Bellingham Shipyards, Bellingham, Washington
- Laid down: 15 October 1953
- Launched: 18 June 1954
- Commissioned: 26 July 1955
- Decommissioned: 1 October 1970
- Reclassified: Coastal Minesweeper, 7 February 1955
- Stricken: 1 July 1975
- Identification: Hull symbol: AMS-206; Hull symbol: MSC-206
- Honors and awards: 7 × engagement stars
- Fate: Sold to Fiji, 14 October 1975

Fiji
- Name: Kiro
- Acquired: 14 October 1975
- Commissioned: 14 October 1975
- Decommissioned: 10 October 1995
- Stricken: 1996
- Identification: Hull sumbol: MSC-206
- Fate: Wrecked and burnt, September 1996

General characteristics
- Class & type: Bluebird-class minesweeper
- Displacement: 412 long tons (419 t)
- Length: 145 ft (44 m)
- Beam: 28 ft (8.5 m)
- Draft: 12 ft (3.7 m)
- Installed power: 2 × General Motors 880 horsepower (660 kW) 8-268A diesel engines; 1,760 horsepower (1,310 kW)
- Propulsion: Snow and Knobstedt single reduction gear; 2 × screws
- Speed: 12.8 kn (23.7 km/h; 14.7 mph)
- Complement: 40
- Armament: 2 × 20 mm (0.8 in) Oerlikon cannons anti-aircraft (AA) mounts; 2 × caliber .50 in (12.7 mm) machine guns; 1 × 81 mm mortar

USS Warbler (AMS/MSC-206) was a Bluebird-class minesweeper of the United States Navy, that saw service during the Vietnam War, and was later sold to Fiji, where she served as HMFS Kiro (MSC-206).

== Construction ==
Warbler was laid down on 15 October 1953, Bellingham Shipyards, Bellingham, Washington; and was launched on 18 June 1954, as AMS-206; sponsored by Mrs. S. A. Blythe; reclassified as MSC-206 on 7 February 1955; and commissioned at the Naval Station, Tacoma, Washington, on 26 July 1955.

== West Coast operations ==
Following shakedown training, Warbler reported to Commander, Mine Force, Pacific Fleet, and operated locally out of Long Beach for the next year.

== Western Pacific service ==
In August 1956, in company with Whippoorwill, the minesweeper set sail for the Far East to assume duties as flagship for Mine Division (MinDiv) 32. Homeporting at Sasebo, Japan, Warbler would remain in the Far East over the next 14 years, participating in numerous mine exercises with the navies of other friendly Far Eastern nations such as South Korea, the Republic of China, the Philippines, and Japan.

=== Vietnam War service ===
Highlighting the ship's deployment to the western Pacific, Warbler conducted numerous tours of duty on "Operation Market Time" patrols off the coast of Vietnam to aid in the interdiction campaign to cut off the flow of arms and munitions to the Viet Cong in South Vietnam. A small wooden craft especially designed for coastal minesweeping operations and deployments lasting from a few days to several weeks, Warbler and her sister minesweepers filled the gap between the heavier units of the fleet, like the destroyers and destroyer escorts, and the small craft used for patrol work, until built-for-the-purpose patrol craft could enter the fray. During her "Market Time" cruises, Warbler boarded many junks, ascertaining cargo and destination; investigated contacts of steel-hulled vessels picked up on radar; and endured what at times appeared to be "fearfully strong weather that seemed bent on total destruction" of the ship. At times, boarding of junks was an impossibility because of the vagaries of monsoon-type weather.

During one "Market Time" patrol in the spring of 1968, Warbler conducted a joint salvage evolution with the salvage vessel Conserver. She located a downed F-100 Super Sabre fighter, and a wayward box of hypodermic needles. The ship also conducted extensive searches for an A-6 Intruder, a medevac helicopter, and two target drones. The minesweeper then cruised off the Vietnamese Demilitarized Zone (DMZ) before heading home to Sasebo, via the Nationalist Chinese port of Kaohsiung.

With 45 days of "Market Time" patrols under her belt in 1968, Warbler returned to the coast of Vietnam in January 1969, and patrolled briefly near the port of Vung Tau. Later that autumn, Warbler, in company with her sister-ship Whippoorwill, departed Sasebo on 5 September, bound for Taiwan and Mine Exercise Canned Heat. Unfortunately beset with mechanical difficulties, the ship went dead in the water in the Formosa Strait after attempted repairs at Keelung, Taiwan, had proved ineffective. Eight hours after the ship stopped, Schofield answered Warbler's call for assistance and passed a tow to the heavily rolling minecraft. By 10 September, after rapid repairs at Kaohsiung, Warbler was ready for sea and participated in the scheduled slate of exercises. At the close of the year, the ship received counter-insurgency practice by tracking high speed patrol boats sent out for exercise purposes by Commander, Mine Flotilla 1.

For two months in 1970, Warbler patrolled between Camranh Bay and Nha Trang, investigating suspicious contacts — none of which proved hostile. "Our greatest excitement during this patrol," her commanding officer later wrote, "was provided by an occasional Soviet merchantman that would steam through our area and find himself shadowed and photographed by the mighty Warbler."

== Decommissioning – Reserve ship ==
Whippoorwill consequently relieved Warbler of "Market Time" duties on 19 July 1970, and the latter got underway from Camranh Bay for the succession of port visits. However, two days after leaving the bay, the ship received a message directing her to return to the United States for decommissioning. Departing Sasebo on 17 August, and sailing via Pearl Harbor for an overnight refueling stop, Warbler reached the west coast of the United States on 17 September, in company with Catskill, Vireo, and Widgeon. On 1 October 1970, Warbler was decommissioned.

Simultaneously placed in service as a Naval Reserve training (NRT) ship and homeported at Seattle, Washington, Warbler commenced her new duties soon thereafter. She trained reservists out of Seattle into the mid-1970s and was placed on the sale list in July 1975.

== Transfer to the Fijian Navy ==
On 14 October 1975, she was sold to Fiji, to serve as HMFS Kiro (MSC-206). On 10 October 1995, she was decommissioned.

== Disposal ==
In September 1996, the decommissioned Kiro was to be disposed by sinking. The designated position for disposal was 19°30′S 177°00′E, however, the unfavorable weather and the very poor material condition of the ship hampered the attempt to tow her. The mast broke off and fell into the sea just as she was exiting the Suva Harbour channel, and later the towing pad eye was ripped off the deck, due to its rotten state. Kiro drifted onto a reef at 18°9.6′S 178°21.58′E where she broke in two. The wreck was later doused with fuel and set on fire. She burned continuously for 19 hours leaving only the engines and the very lower part of the hull.

== Awards ==
Warbler was awarded seven engagement stars for her important services on "Market Time" patrols.

== Bibliography ==
Online resources

- "Warbler II (MSC-208)". Dictionary of American Naval Fighting Ships. Naval History and Heritage Command. 26 October 2015. This article incorporates text from this source, which is in the public domain.
- "USS Warbler (MSC-206)". NavSource.
