= USS Albatross (MSC-289) =

Minesweeper of the United States Navy

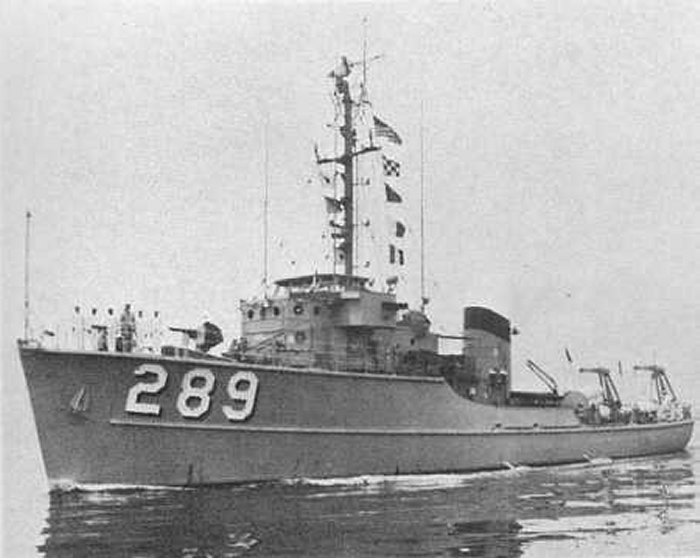
- USS Albatross (MSC-289) c. 1962

History

United States
- Name: USS Albatross (MSC-289)
- Namesake: Albatross
- Laid down: 26 February 1959
- Launched: 22 March 1960
- Sponsored by: Mrs. S. A. Peters
- Commissioned: 20 April 1961
- Decommissioned: 1 April 1970
- Stricken: 1 April 1970
- Fate: Sold for scrap in November 1970 to Kitajima Shokai Co., Ltd. of Sasebo, Japan

General characteristics
- Class & type: Albatross-class coastal minesweeper
- Displacement: 320 t (310 long tons)
- Length: 144 ft (44 m)
- Beam: 28 ft (8.5 m)
- Draught: 9 ft (2.7 m)
- Propulsion: Harnischfeger diesel engines, two shafts
- Speed: 13 kts
- Complement: 50
- Armament: two .50 cal (12.7 mm) machine guns and one 81mm mortar

USS Albatross (MSC-289) was the lead ship of the Albatross-class coastal minesweeper acquired by the U.S. Navy for clearing coastal minefields.

The sixth ship to be named Albatross by the navy, MSC-289 was laid down on 26 February 1959 by Tacoma Boatbuilding Company, Tacoma, Washington, launched on 22 March 1960; sponsored by Mrs. S. A. Peters, and commissioned at the Puget Sound Naval Shipyard on 20 April 1961.

== West Coast operations ==
Albatross spent the next 14 months homeported at Long Beach, California, conducting shakedown and type training off the U.S. West Coast. On 2 July 1962, Albatross got underway with the other ships of Mine Division (MinDiv) 92, bound for the western Pacific Ocean. En route to Japan, the ship stopped briefly at Pearl Harbor, Midway Island, and Guam. She reached her new home port Sasebo, on 13 August and, after two months of upkeep, spent the rest of the year in training.

== Operations in Korea and Japan ==
Refresher training occupied her during the first six weeks of 1963. While conducting an exercise on 16 February, Albatross suffered damage to her port reduction gear which idled the ship under repairs until 5 March. Albatross then joined an exercise with naval forces of the Republic of Korea at Chumunjin, Korea. She paid a brief visit to Kure, Japan, on 19 March, and took part in a mine exercise from 20 to 25 March off Iwakuni, Japan. The minesweeper next stopped at Beppu, Japan, and then returned to Sasebo on 30 March.

== Drydock period in Sasebo ==
On 13 May, Albatross sailed for Buckner Bay, Okinawa, and a mine test which lasted until 30 May when she headed back to ward Sasebo for upkeep and training. Another exercise with the Republic of Korea Navy occurred from 4 to 10 September at Yosu-Haeman, Korea. When she returned to Sasebo, Albatross entered drydock for two weeks. Following further repairs Albatross left Sasebo on 24 October and joined a U.S. 7th Fleet exercise, "Yellow Bird," off Subic Bay, Philippines, on 5 November. On 13 November, the ship got underway for Hong Kong and a period of rest and relaxation. Albatross arrived back at Sasebo on 27 November and spent the next six weeks in leave and upkeep.

== Kaohsiung exercises ==
The minesweeper resumed her duties on 22 February 1964 when she sailed for Taiwan. She reached Kaohsiung on 26 February and began steaming with MinDiv 31 off the southwest coast of that island. A brief stop at Keelung preceded her return to Sasebo on 13 March and four months of local operations and upkeep.

== Vietnam War operations ==
In response to the growing American involvement in Vietnam Albatross departed Japan on 9 July bound for Camranh Bay. After an intermediate stop at Subic Bay, she entered Camranh Bay on 16 July. Besides her duties there, she also operated from Nha Trang and Ben Goi. On 1 August, Albatross was detached from her Vietnamese service and sailed for the Philippines. She reached Subic Bay on 4 August and began upkeep. Late in August, the minesweeper made a trip to Hong Kong for a rest and relaxation period before returning to Sasebo on 3 September. Albatross next assignment took her to Korea from 9 to 17 November for visits to Chinhae and Tolsan Do and joint exercises with Korean naval forces. On the 18th, Albatross was back at Sasebo. The minesweeper took part in training exercises with the Japanese Maritime Self Defense Force from 3 to 5 December then remained at Sasebo for the rest of the year.

== Failure of an engine part ==
For the first three months of 1965, Albatross was undergoing repairs at Sasebo. On 19 April, the minesweeper got underway for patrol duties off the coast of Vietnam. After a brief stop at Subic Bay, Albatross sailed on to Vietnamese waters which she reached on 25 April. The ship remained on duty in the combat zone through 30 May, when she was relieved and headed back to Subic Bay. The vessel remained in the Philippines from 2 to 9 June, then headed back to the Vietnam coast for further operations. On the 13th, she suffered a reduction gear casualty which necessitated the securing of her port engines. Leader (MSO-490) soon took Albatross under tow and headed for Subic Bay where they arrived on 17 June.

Following two months of repairs and upkeep at Subic Bay and Sasebo, Albatross arrived at Yokosuka on 14 August for a series of training exercises. She returned to Sasebo on 15 September but got underway a week later to resume her patrol off the Vietnamese coast. The ship made a brief stop at Kaohsiung, Taiwan, on 25 September. On 1 October, she began patrolling in the South China Sea. The minesweeper was relieved on 6 November and steamed to Hong Kong for a period of rest and relaxation. She reached Kaohsiung on 16 November and conducted mine warfare exercises off the coast of Taiwan before heading to Japan. The vessel arrived at Sasebo on 28 November and remained there through the end of the year.

== Operation Market Time participation ==
The minesweeper departed Sasebo on 5 January 1966 for an "Operation Market Time" deployment off the coast of Vietnam. On the 9th she paused briefly at Kaohsiung to take on fuel and provisions. She arrived on her station south of Vung Tau on 14 January and patrolled the sea lanes in her area until relieved on 22 February. The minesweeper returned to Sasebo on 5 March to begin one and one-half months of upkeep and training. On 21 April Albatross sailed in company with Epping Forest (MCS-7), Warbler (MSC-206), and Peacock (MSC-198) for Chinhae, Korea and an exercise with the Republic of Korea Navy. Following the five-day exercise, she visited Kure on 29 April before returning to Sasebo on 4 May. Albatross got underway on 20 May for the South China Sea in company with Warbler. Her station was located off the tip of the Camau peninsula, and her patrol lasted through 9 July. Albatross then sailed due south to visit Singapore from 12 to 16 July and made a port call at Hong Kong before among back in Sasebo on 30 July.

== Return to Japan for repairs ==
Tests and training occupied Albatross through 19 September at which time she got underway for another "Market Time" deployment. Albatross was assigned an area in the vicinity of the Phu Quoc Islands in the Gulf of Thailand. Her relief arrived on 7 November, and Albatross sailed to Kaohsiung for repairs to an inoperative air compressor system which hindered her maneuverability. The minesweeper reached Sasebo on 18 November for training and holiday leave. On 29 December 1966 she left Japan for another patrol in the South China Sea.

== Cryptographic and propulsion problems ==
Albatross was on patrol through 17 February 1967, when she was relieved by Peacock. That same day, she suffered damage to her cryptographic equipment, necessitating a rendezvous with Annapolis (AGMR-1) for repairs. The minesweeper spent the next five months in overhaul at Sasebo. On 27 August, she was underway for Subic Bay and gunfire support training. She left the Philippines on 8 September for a "Market Time" patrol in the area of Nha Yang, Vietnam, and steamed on station through 12 October, when she was relieved and headed for Subic Bay. The ship entered the floating drydock AFDM-5 on the 15th and, by 25 October, was underway for Sasebo. There, she spent the next three and one-half months working on and replacing a faulty main propulsion plant.

== Search and rescue operations ==
The ship took part in Exercise "Golden Shark" off Hiroshima, Japan, from 16 to 24 February 1968. The exercise was held in conjunction with the Japanese Maritime Self-Defense Force. From 25 to 28 February, she paid a visit to Hiroshima, then sailed to Yokosuka for two weeks of upkeep. On 14 March Albatross was involved in a search and rescue operation in Tokyo Bay. A harbor craft located the downed airplane, and, the next day, Albatross headed for Sasebo where she spent the month of April in refresher training and upkeep.

== Return to Vietnam combat zone ==
She got underway on 25 April to begin a patrol off the Vietnamese coast. Albatross operated for 42 days in the combat zone and was relieved by Widgeon (MSC-208) on 6 June. After a brief pause at Sasebo, Albatross sailed for Buckner Bay, Okinawa, on 20 June. While en route, she held mine countermeasures training. Upon her return to Sasebo on 5 July, the minesweeper spent three months in upkeep and training. On 17 October, she commenced another stint off Vietnam. This patrol was hampered by heavy seas; and, following her relief, her departure was delayed by steaming to evade a typhoon in the Gulf of Thailand. After a five-day rest period in Hong Kong, Albatross got underway on 10 December to return to Sasebo.

== Gulf of Tonkin operations ==
Albatross began her first "Market Time" patrol of 1969 on 5 March. She remained in the Gulf of Tonkin for 44 days before sailing to Hong Kong on 24 April for a rest and relaxation period. The ship spent the remainder of the year alternating periods of upkeep in Sasebo with training exercises in Japanese waters.

Albatross began 1970 in upkeep at Sasebo. On 16 February she was en route to Subic Bay for a minehunting drill. On 19 February, the mission was cancelled and Albatross was called back to Japan to prepare for decommissioning. The ship arrived in Sasebo on 25 February, and the unloading of her equipment and supplies began.

== Decommissioning ==
On 1 April, Albatross was simultaneously decommissioned and struck from the Navy list. Albatross was sold in November 1970 to Kitajima Shokai Co., Ltd., Sasebo, Japan, for scrapping.
