= USS Woodpecker =

Bluebird-class minesweeper

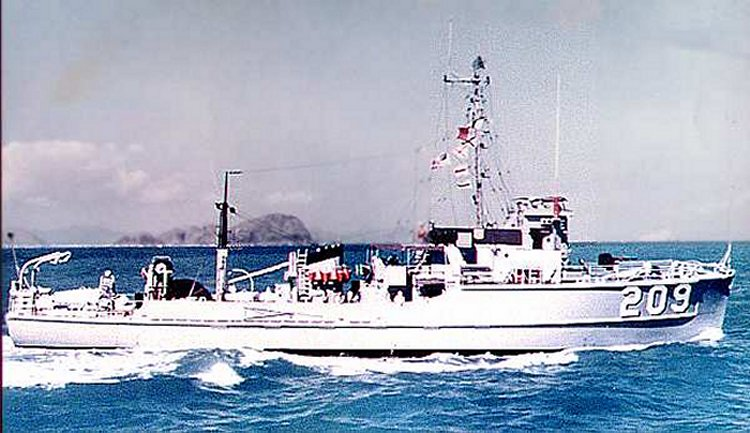
- USS Woodpecker (MSC-209) sweeping

History

United States
- Name: Woodpecker
- Namesake: Woodpecker
- Builder: Bellingham Shipyards, Bellingham, Washington
- Laid down: 23 June 1954
- Launched: 7 January 1955
- Commissioned: 3 February 1956
- Decommissioned: 15 December 1970
- Reclassified: Coastal Minesweeper, 7 February 1955
- Stricken: 1 July 1976
- Identification: Hull symbol: AMS-209; Hull symbol: MSC-209
- Fate: Sold to Republic of Fiji

Republic of Fiji
- Name: Kikau
- Namesake: Kikau
- Identification: Hull sumbol: MSC-204
- Fate: Sunk as artificial reef 1990

General characteristics
- Class & type: Bluebird-class minesweeper
- Displacement: 320 long tons (330 t)
- Length: 144 ft (44 m)
- Beam: 28 ft (8.5 m)
- Draft: 9 ft (2.7 m)
- Installed power: 2 × General Motors 880 horsepower (660 kW) 8-268A diesel engines; 1,760 horsepower (1,310 kW)
- Propulsion: Snow and Knobstedt single reduction gear; 2 × screws
- Speed: 13 kn (24 km/h; 15 mph)
- Complement: 40
- Armament: 2 × 20 mm (0.8 in) Oerlikon cannons anti-aircraft (AA) mounts; 2 × caliber .50 in (12.7 mm) machine guns; 1 × 81 mm mortar

USS Woodpecker (AMS/MSC-209) was a Bluebird-class minesweeper of the United States Navy, that saw service during the Vietnam War, and was later sold to the Republic of Fiji where she served as HMFS Kikau (MSC-204).

== Construction ==
Woodpecker was laid down on 23 June 1954, Bellingham Shipyards, Bellingham, Washington; and was launched on 7 January 1955, as AMS-209; sponsored by Mrs. John L. Thomas. reclassified as MSC-209 on 7 February 1955; and commissioned 3 February 1956.

== West Coast service ==
During trials and training at Long Beach, California, Woodpecker joined the Mine Force, US Pacific Fleet, and prepared, by a trip to San Diego for underway training and two short yard periods in May and August, at Wilmington Boat Works, Wilmington, California, for duty in the Far East.

== Western Pacific service ==
On 1 October 1956, Woodpecker sailed for Japan via Pearl Harbor and Midway Island. Upon completion of voyage repairs in Yokosuka, Japan, she moved to Sasebo, Japan, her new home port, arriving there in early November 1956.

The minesweeper spent the year 1957, conducting various exercises in Taiwan, Korea, Japan, Saipan, and Dingalan Bay, Philippines. The year 1958, began with Woodpecker conducting minesweeping exercises with the Republic of Korea Navy at Koji Do, Korea. During the year, the ship conducted two good-will tours in Japan: the first from 23 to 27 January; and the second from 28 May to 15 June. The latter encompassed eight Japanese cities. Woodpecker took part in combined minesweeping operations with the Republic of Korea and the Japanese Maritime Self Defense Force. Due to tension between communist China on the mainland and Nationalist Chinese on Taiwan, Woodpecker served in the Formosa Strait area from September to November. Upon her return to Sasebo on 8 November, she underwent availability and interim dry docking throughout November. She finished out the year 1958, by searching for and locating a downed US Air Force plane off Fukuoka, Japan.

Woodpecker spent the early part of 1959, conducting exercises at Taiwan and at Subic Bay and Manila in the Philippines. On 22 March, the ship departed Sasebo for a brief trip to Yosu Hae, Korea. Woodpecker sailed for Okinawa on 8 April, and remained at Buckner Bay through 27 April. She then returned to Sasebo and prepared for a voyage to Korea. Woodpecker arrived at Pusan, Korea, on 1 June, and operated between Pusan and Pohang for nine days before returning to Maizuru, Japan.

Woodpecker spent the period from 9 June through 30 September, visiting Maizuru, Sasebo, and Yokosuka, Japan. The ship arrived at Kaohsiung, Taiwan, on 30 September, and operated between that port and Sasebo through 26 October. Woodpecker then spent the remainder of 1959, visiting Hong Kong and in port at Sasebo.

The new year, 1960, found Woodpecker at Sasebo. On 25 January, she began searching for a downed aircraft in waters near Iwakuni and Imabari, Japan. The search continued into February, and ended on 4 February, when the ship returned to Sasebo and remained there until 28 March, when she sailed for Okinawa. Departing Buckner Bay on 13 April, Woodpecker returned to Sasebo to join in fleet exercises before going into dry dock on 21 April, and was under repairs until 31 May.

Woodpecker arrived at Pusan, Korea, on 9 June 1960, for "Phiblex" operations off Pohang, South Korea, and spent the remainder of June, conducting exercises at Yongil Mon and San Chon Po, Korea, and Miko Wan, Japan.

On 1 July, the minesweeper got underway for Sasebo, where she remained until 18 July, when she departed for Minamata, Japan. Woodpecker spent four days at Minamata and five days at Yokosuka before returning to Sasebo on 1 August. She remained at her home port until 9 September, when she began a two-day round-trip voyage to Pohang, Korea.

Woodpecker departed Sasebo on 13 October, bound for Hong Kong. On 29 October, she set course for Okinawa and remained at Buckner Bay until 6 November, when she sailed for her home port. During December, Woodpecker visited Kure and Hiroshima, Japan, before returning to Sasebo on 11 December, for the remainder of 1960.

The ship spent the first part of 1961, undergoing various inspections, overhauls, and refresher training at Yokosuka. From 18 to 25 July, Woodpecker made a "People-to-People" visit to Maizuru and Tsuruga Wan, Japan. During August and September, the ship took part in exercises with the Republic of Korea Navy and the Japanese Maritime Self Defense Force. This was followed by a rest and rehabilitation run to Hong Kong and a period in dry dock ending on 30 November. Woodpecker finished the year 1961, in the area of Fukuoka Wan and Iwakuni, Japan, conducting two plane hunts, with one success.

Woodpecker spent 1962, in much the same manner as the previous year. During January, she transported an explosive ordnance disposal (EOD) team to Ikishima, Japan. A period of exercises and inspections followed, along with a "People-to-People" visit to Tokuyama and Shimonoseki, Japan, in July. From October through December, Woodpecker underwent an overhaul at Sasebo followed by mine countermeasures refresher training.

An exciting episode in Woodpecker's career occurred on 24 February 1962, in Japan's Inland Sea. A fire fighting team from the ship joined one from Widgeon in fighting and extinguishing a raging fire in the engine room of Daiyu Maru.

From 2 through 25 January 1963, Woodpecker conducted refresher training at Yokosuka, Japan. She closed the month with a "People-to-People" visit to Kobe, Japan. The ship spent February and March, participating in combined operations "Minex" with the navies of Korea and Japan. After several inspections and port visits, Woodpecker entered dry dock in mid-September, at Sasebo. On 1 November, the ship took part in Operation "Yellow Bird" in Lingayen Gulf, off Luzon in the Philippines. Following a rest and recreation at Hong Kong, Woodpecker joined in Operation "Big Dipper" in Taiwanese waters which kept her busy through the end of the year.

Woodpecker began 1964, by taking part in Operation "Polar Bear" at Chinhae, Korea, and then participated in Exercise "Back Pack" at Taiwan from 28 February to 8 March. She devoted the remainder of the year to several inspections, upkeep, and overhaul at Subic Bay, Philippines, and at Sasebo, Japan.

Overhaul and refresher training filled the months of January and February 1965, for the minesweeper. After making port visits at Manila, Philippines, and Bangkok, Thailand, the ship conducted Operation "Jungle Drum," a joint United States-Thai operation which lasted from 14 to 30 March, in the Gulf of Siam.

=== Vietnam War service ===
After a brief upkeep period at Subic Bay, Woodpecker was ordered to South Vietnam when the Navy began coastal surveillance operations to combat communist infiltration from the north. This first deployment to "Operation Market Time" patrols was conducted during September and October 1965, and for the periods from March through April and from July through August in 1966. During these operations, Woodpecker functioned as a patrol vessel: monitoring coastal traffic, boarding suspicious junks, and participating in naval gunfire support missions.

About this time, Woodpecker underwent a series of modifications which increased her capabilities and fitted her to carry out challenging operations in Southeast Asia. A series of ship alterations in 1965 and 1966 modernized the ship's communications facilities. In October 1966, she became the first coastal minesweeper in the Western Pacific (WestPac) to operate an on-line cryptographic facility. Woodpecker returned to her "Market Time" patrol off the coast of South Vietnam for April and May 1967, then again in December of that year.

The new year commenced with Woodpecker still on "Market Time" duty off South Vietnam. She completed that assignment on 12 January 1968, and proceeded via Subic Bay to Sasebo where she underwent availability.

On 26 March 1968, Woodpecker got underway for Okinawa and a month of exercises. The ship sailed on 27 April for Exercise "Tarawa", held at Manila with minesweepers from the Philippines, Australia and Great Britain. The exercise ended on 24 May 1968; a month later, she took part in "Reftrex 3-68" and underwent her annual operational readiness inspection.

"Market Time" patrol duty in Vietnam occupied Woodpecker until 7 September, when she moved to Subic Bay for repairs which lasted through 27 October, then spent the remainder of 1968 at Sasebo.

The year 1969 began with a two-week fleet service mine test at Buckner Bay. After an upkeep period in Sasebo, Woodpecker returned to sea for a joint exercise with the Japanese Maritime Self Defense Force. On 3 March 1969, the ship commenced her regularly scheduled overhaul. Sea trials, refresher training, and two inspections followed. Woodpecker sailed for Vietnam on 13 July and resumed "Market Time" patrols. Her duties included search and rescue missions, illumination firing, plus harassment and interdiction fire. The ship returned to Sasebo on 1 October. Mine countermeasures refresher training at Buckner Bay from 10 to 22 October was followed by a brief stay at Sasebo. From 3 to 13 November, Woodpecker joined in a mine countermeasure exercise with the Korean and British navies. Then, a dependents' cruise and a port visit to Kagoshima, Japan, ensued. The remainder of the year was spent in leave and upkeep status at Sasebo, Japan.

For the first three months of 1970, Woodpecker conducted operations in Subic Bay, Philippines; Buckner Bay, Okinawa (Japan); and Vietnam. She returned to Sasebo on 22 April, and remained there through 29 June, except for a period of refresher training at Yokosuka. On 7 July, Woodpecker left Sasebo and proceeded to Kaohsiung for a "Minex" exercise with elements of the Taiwanese Navy. This was followed early in August by exercises with units of the Japanese fleet at Mutsuwan, Japan. The ship returned to Sasebo on 21 August, and made preparations for her return to the United States. Woodpecker returned to Pearl Harbor on 31 October and reached Long Beach, California on 11 November. After a short upkeep period, she departed for Seattle, Washington, and inactivation. On 15 December 1970, Woodpecker was decommissioned and converted to a Naval Reserve training vessel. She was stricken from the Navy list on 1 July 1975, and sold to the Republic of Fiji.

== Bibliography ==
- "Woodpecker". Dictionary of American Naval Fighting Ships. Naval History and Heritage Command. 3 November 2015. This article incorporates text from this source, which is in the public domain.
- "USS Woodpecker (MSC-209)". NavSource.
