= Vireo (disambiguation) =

A vireo is a small passerine bird.

Vireo may also refer to:

- Vireo (genus), genus of the vireo birds
- Vickers Vireo, an experimental 1920s aircraft
- USS Vireo (AM-52), a minesweeper laid down in 1918 by the Philadelphia Navy Yard
- USS Vireo (MSC-205), a minesweeper laid down as AMS-205 in 1953 at the Bellingham Shipyards
- Vireo Records, a record label that was a division of Sparrow Corporation
- Visual Resources for Ornithology (VIREO), a large online repository of bird photographs at the Academy of Natural Sciences of Drexel University
