= Bellhop (disambiguation) =

A bellhop is a hotel porter.

"Bellhop" may also refer to:

- The Bell Hop, a 1921 film
- Hop, the Bellhop, a 1919 film
- Bellhops, an American moving company

== See also ==
- Bellboy (disambiguation)
