= USS Phoebe (MSC-199) =

Minesweeper of the United States Navy

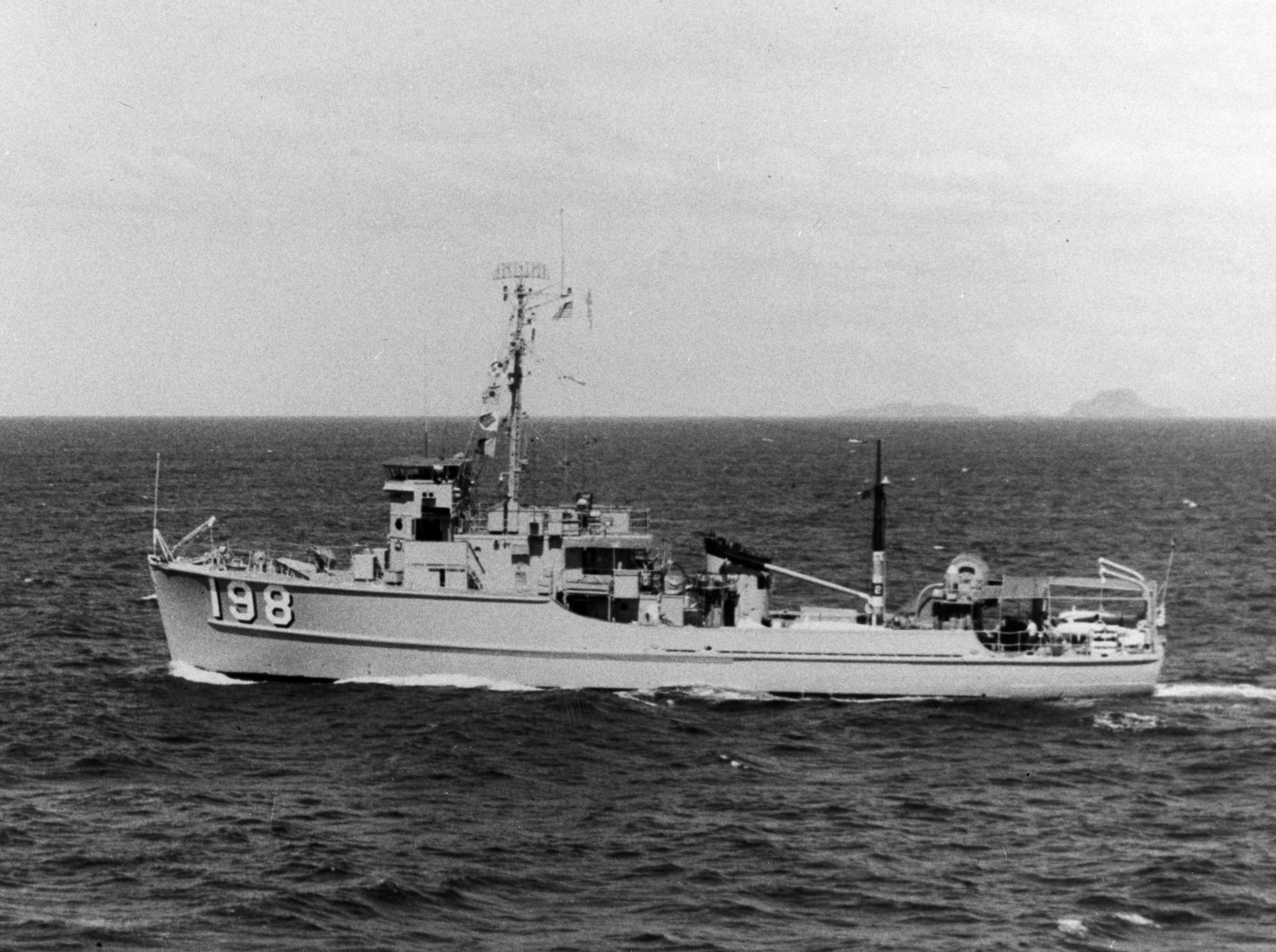
- Bluebird-class minesweeper

History

United States
- Name: Phoebe
- Namesake: Phoebe
- Builder: Harbor Boat Building Company, Terminal Island, California
- Laid down: 26 February 1953
- Launched: 21 August 1954
- Commissioned: 29 April 1955
- Decommissioned: 14 December 1970
- Reclassified: Coastal Minesweeper, 7 February 1955
- Stricken: 1 July 1975
- Identification: Hull symbol: AMS-199; Hull symbol: MSC-199
- Fate: Sold for scrap, 1 September 1976

General characteristics
- Class & type: Bluebird-class minesweeper
- Displacement: 362 long tons (368 t)
- Length: 144 ft 3 in (43.97 m)
- Beam: 27 ft 2 in (8.28 m)
- Draft: 12 ft (3.7 m)
- Installed power: 4 × Packard 600 hp (450 kW) diesel engines; 2,400 hp (1,800 kW)
- Propulsion: 2 × screws
- Speed: 13.6 kn (25.2 km/h; 15.7 mph)
- Complement: 40
- Armament: 1 × twin 20 mm (0.8 in) Oerlikon cannons anti-aircraft (AA) mounts

USS Phoebe (AMS/MSC-199) was a Bluebird-class minesweeper in the United States Navy for clearing coastal minefields.

== Construction ==
The second Phoebe to be named by the Navy was laid down 26 February 1953, as AMS-199, by the Harbor Boat Building Company, Terminal Island, California; launched 21 August 1954; sponsored by Mrs. Anne Elizabeth Gotch; as a coastal minesweeper MSC-199, on 7 February 1955; and commissioned 29 April 1955.

== Service as training ship ==
After training out of Long Beach, California, and San Diego, California, Phoebe served as a schoolship for the prospective crew of Whippoorwill in early summer and in September, of Widgeon.

== Operations in the Far East ==
Phoebe became flagship of Mine Division 31, Mine Squadron 3, on 6 January 1956. She departed Long Beach 4 March, for the Far East, touched the Hawaiian Islands, and arrived Yokosuka, Japan, 4 April. Six days later she shifted to Sasebo, her permanent base of operations. A unit of Mine Squadron 3, Phoebe spent the next eight years in a rigorous schedule of minehunting and warfare tactics with the US 7th Fleet. Much of her time was taken for maneuvers with minesweeping units of the Japanese Maritime Self Defense Force, the Chinese Nationalist Navy, the Republic of Korea Navy, and the Republic of the Philippines Navy. This duty took her to the principal ports of Japan, Taiwan, Korea, Okinawa, and the Philippines.

Early 1964, was spent operating out of Japan and Okinawa In July, Phoebe sailed for Subic Bay, the South China Sea, and Vietnam, returning to Subic Bay in August. A U.S.-Korean mine exercise was held in October, and a US-Japanese mine exercise in December.

== Supporting Operation Market Time ==
Phoebe spent five months of 1965, on "Operation Market Time" in Vietnam. She spent the beginning, middle, and end of the year in Japan. During the year she steamed 24,000 nmi (44,000 km; 28,000 mi), reaching as far from her homeport as Bangkok.

In March 1967, Phoebe resumed "Market Time" operations in Vietnam waters. Most of the rest of the year she operated out of Sasebo, with a combined US-Republic of China mine exercise in September, and more "Market Time" service in November.

== Boarding junks and other operations ==
In February 1968, Phoebe took part in a combined US-Japanese mine exercise. Most of the rest of the year she operated out of Sasebo, with a "Market Time" patrol in September and October, during which she boarded 201 junks and a US-Korean mine exercise in November. As of late 1969, Phoebe still operated out of Sasebo, Japan.

== Decommissioning ==
Phoebe was decommissioned, 14 December 1970, struck from the Naval Vessel Register, 1 July 1975, and was disposed of through the Defense Reutilization and Marketing Service for scrap, 1 September 1976.

== Notes ==
Citations

== Bibliography ==
Online resources

- "Phoebe II (AMS-199)". Dictionary of American Naval Fighting Ships. Naval History and Heritage Command. 20 August 2015. This article incorporates text from this source, which is in the public domain.
- "USS Phoebe (MSC-199)". NavSource.
