= USS Schofield =

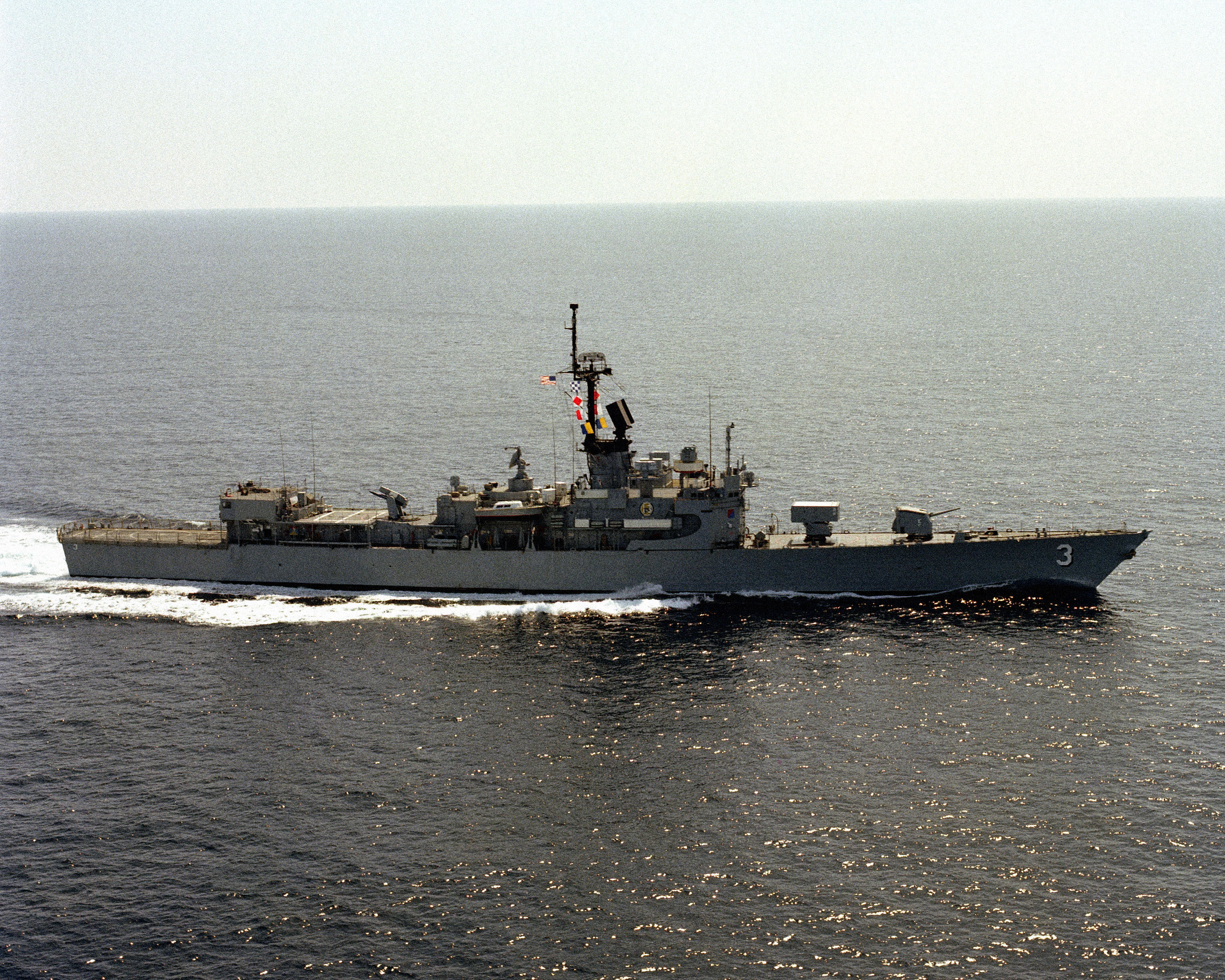
- USS Schofield (DEG-3/FFG-3)

History

United States
- Namesake: Frank Herman Schofield
- Ordered: 4 January 1962
- Builder: Lockheed Shipbuilding and Construction Company, Seattle, Washington
- Laid down: 15 April 1963
- Launched: 7 December 1963
- Acquired: 3 May 1968
- Commissioned: 11 May 1968 as DEG-3
- Decommissioned: 8 September 1988
- Reclassified: as FFG-3 30 June 1975
- Stricken: 25 January 1992
- Motto: Liberte par Vigilance
- Fate: Sunk as a target, 2 November 1999

General characteristics
- Class & type: Brooke-class frigate
- Displacement: 3,426 tons full
- Length: 414 ft (126 m)
- Beam: 44 ft (13 m)
- Draft: 14 ft 6 in (4.4 m)
- Propulsion: 2 Foster-Wheeler boilers, 1 Westinghouse geared turbine
- Speed: 27.2 knots (31.3 mph; 50.4 km/h)
- Range: 4,000 nautical miles (7,000 km)
- Complement: 14 officers, 214 crew
- Sensors & processing systems: AN/SPS-52 3D air search radar; AN/SPS-10 surface search radar; AN/SPG-51 missile fire control radar; AN/SQS-26 bow mounted sonar
- Electronic warfare & decoys: AN/SLQ-32; AN/SLQ-25 Nixie
- Armament: 1 × 5"/38 caliber gun; 1 × Mk 22 RIM-24 Tartar/RIM-66 Standard missile launcher (16 missiles); 1 × 8 cell ASROC launcher; 2 × 3 12.75 in (324mm) Mk 32 torpedo tubes, Mk 46 torpedoes; 2 × MK 37 torpedo tubes (fixed, stern, removed later)
- Aircraft carried: SH-2 Seasprite

USS Schofield (FFG-3) was a Brooke-class frigate laid down on 15 April 1963 by the Lockheed Shipbuilding and Construction Co., Seattle, Washington and launched on 7 December 1963. The ship was sponsored by Mrs. F. Perry Schofield and commissioned on 11 May 1968. The ship was named after US Navy Admiral Frank Herman Schofield. Schofield received four battle stars for service in Vietnam.

== Operational history ==
=== Pacific ===
Following shakedown, Schofield conducted training exercises, both independently and with her squadron, Destroyer Squadron 23, out of her home port of Long Beach, California. With the new year, 1969, she participated in 1st Fleet exercises; and, at the end of March, she headed across the Pacific for her first WestPac deployment.

On 24 April, the guided missile escort ship joined the 7th Fleet. On 7 May, she commenced operations with USS Bon Homme Richard in the Gulf of Tonkin. A week later, she put into Subic Bay; then, after upkeep, she joined other 7th Fleet units in Operation Sea Spirit, a combined SEATO exercise terminated on 3 June following the collision of USS Frank E. Evans and HMAS Melbourne.

On 17 June, Schofield moved back into the Gulf of Tonkin, remaining into July. On the 6th, she departed the area and headed for Japan where she participated in a joint United States Navy-Japanese Maritime Self Defense Force exercise; then, toward the end of the month, she again set a course for the South China Sea.

Schofield returned to the Gulf of Tonkin on the 27th and, for the next two weeks, operated with USS Kearsarge. A visit to Hong Kong followed. On 22 August, she returned to Subic Bay; and, in early September, she moved north for patrol duty in the Taiwan Strait. On the night of the 8th, she steamed to the assistance of USS Warbler caught in heavy seas 70 nautical miles (130 km) away and unable to transfer fuel to her engine. By the time Schofield arrived, the mine craft was dead in the water. At daybreak, however, Schofield took Warbler in tow and headed for Kaohsiung, whence she returned to patrol duty.

Three days later, Schofield continued north to Japan; participated in Hunter-killer Group exercises; then sailed for Hong Kong, where, for two weeks, she served as a station ship. On 23 October, she returned to Japan; and, on 6 November, she headed home.

=== SS Connecticut rescue ===
Arriving at Long Beach on 21 October 1969, Schofield remained in port for most of the remainder of the year. In January 1970, she resumed her antisubmarine warfare exercises off the California coast. Early on the morning of the 9th, the exercises with her squadron and USS Hornet were interrupted to assist a merchant tanker, SS Connecticut, reported being sinking approximately 200 nautical miles (370 km) away. En route to the scene, Schofield refuelled Hornet helicopters delivering rescue personnel and equipment to the tanker. Two of Schofield's men, EMCS P. L. Kidd and BT1 A. E. Personette, were transferred to the tanker. The tanker's master commended the work in saving the ship.

When Schofield arrived on the scene late in the afternoon, the situation was under control. That evening, the exercises were resumed. At mid-month, Schofield returned to Long Beach and entered the naval shipyard there for a yard period which took her into March. Squadron exercises, target ship duty, missile firing exercises, and a reservist training cruise followed. In July, she again entered the shipyard for boiler overhaul work; and, in October, she resumed her 1st Fleet operating schedule.

On 7 January 1971, Schofield headed west. Into February, she conducted exercises in Hawaiian waters, then returned to the west coast for Operation Admixture, a joint United States-Canada exercise. During the exercise, Schofield added mothership duties for the experimental hydrofoil, USS High Point, to her helicopter inflight refuelling, plane guard, and escort responsibilities.

The exercise was completed on 4 March. Schofield then returned briefly to Long Beach; and, on the 11th, she departed the California coast for the western Pacific. Steaming in company with ASW (Antisubmarine Warfare) Group 3, she joined the 7th Fleet on the 26th. On 3 and 4 April, she operated off the Vietnamese coast; and, on the 7th, she arrived in Subic Bay.

Five days later, the group got underway for Singapore, whence they proceeded into the Indian Ocean for antisubmarine warfare exercises. At the end of the month, the ships sailed for Hong Kong; and, on the 11th, they got underway for Japan.

After repairs at Yokosuka, Schofield participated in the first major United States task force exercise in the Sea of Japan in several years; then, on 17 June, she sailed for home. Proceeding north, she participated in antisubmarine warfare exercises between Attu and Kamchatka. On 5 July, she arrived at Long Beach. In August, she began preparations for her first major overhaul. On 1 September, she shifted her home port to San Diego; and, on 8 September, she entered the Long Beach Naval Shipyard for an extended overhaul which took her into 1972.

The overhaul was completed on 6 June 1972, and Schofield sailed to her new home port, San Diego. The next three months were spent in refresher training and various exercises, including two successful launchings of her TARTAR missiles, at the Pacific Missile Range.

=== Vietnam ===
On 9 September, Schofield departed San Diego for her third tour with the 7th Fleet. After brief stops at Pearl Harbor, Midway Island, Guam, and Subic Bay, she joined TU 77.0.1 in the Tonkin Gulf on 8 October. She received her first bombardment mission of the deployment 20 days later and fired all night. On 30 October, she departed the area for Kaohsiung and a period of upkeep. She was back on station in the Tonkin Gulf from 9 November to 8 December for another line period. She then visited Hong Kong and Sasebo before returning to the firing line on New Year's Day, 1973.

Schofield acted as a picket ship until mid-January when she was assigned to provide fire support. She fired daily missions until the 26th when she departed for Subic Bay. She returned to Yankee Station on 13 February and learned that, due to the cessation of hostilities, her WestPac deployment was to be reduced by one month. On 15 February, she sailed for Yokosuka and San Diego, arriving at her home port on 9 March.

During a period of restricted availability between April and September, Schofield received extensive helicopter facilities to enable her to operate the SH-2 LAMPS (Light Airborne Multi-Purpose System) helicopter. She held sea trials in October, firing exercises in early November; and, on the 23rd, she was underway for the western Pacific.

Schofield participated in exercises at Pearl Harbor and Midway Island before entering Subic Bay on 18 December. Four days later, she departed for Singapore with orders to continue from there to the Indian Ocean and conduct surveillance operations. She returned to San Diego on 6 June 1974.

Schofield left San Diego March 28,1975 for its 5th Westpac arriving in Hawaii early April then to Guam arriving April 28, 1975 and departing May 9, 1975 after much needed repairs. The Schofield proceeded to help with Operation New Life, the evacuation of refugees to the Philippines. After a brief stop at the Philippines May 18, 1975, the Schofield patroled in the area arriving in Sattahip, Thailand on May 22, 1975. After a five day port of call liberty, the Schofield departed Thailand enroute back to Subic Bay, PI.

== Fate ==
Schofield was decommissioned on 8 September 1988 and stricken from the Navy Register on 25 January 1992. The ship was sunk as a target on 2 November 1999, SW of Point Conception, NW of San Miguel Island at 34 16 N -- 120 48 W.
