= Bellboy (disambiguation) =

A bellboy is a hotel porter.

Bellboy or Bell boy may also refer to:

- Bell Boy 13, a 1923 film starring Douglas MacLean
- The Bellboy, a 1960 Jerry Lewis film
- The Bell Boy a 1918 short film
- "Bell Boy" (song) by The Who
- Bell Boy (boat), a line of fiberglass boats produced in the 1950s and 1960s
- Bellboy pager

== See also ==
- Bellhop (disambiguation)
- Bellman (disambiguation)
