= Harbor Boat Building Company =

Shipyard in San Pedro, California, United States

Coordinates: 33.738035°N 118.267862°W

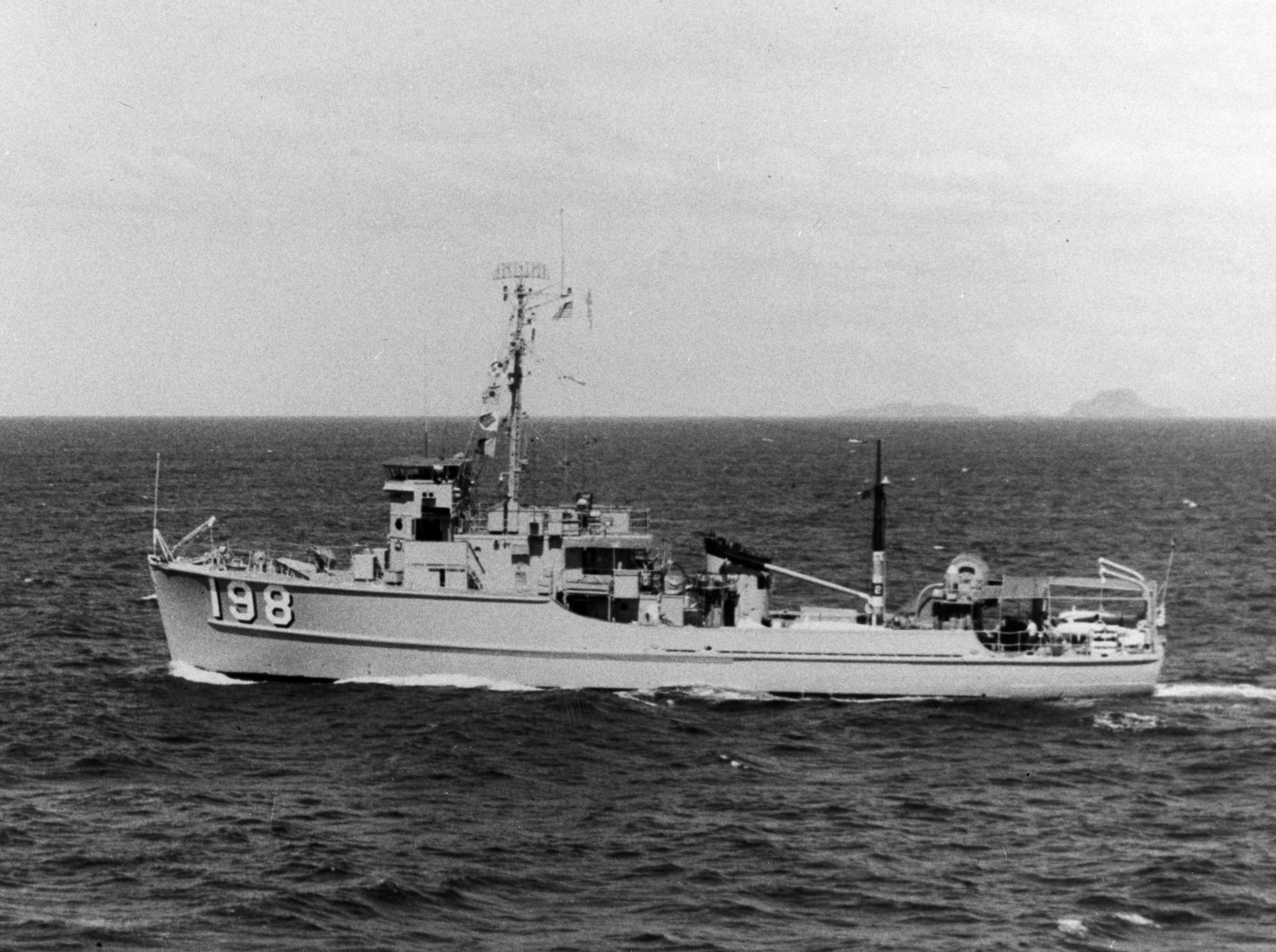
Harbor Boat Building's Adjutant-class minesweeper USS Peacock in 1969

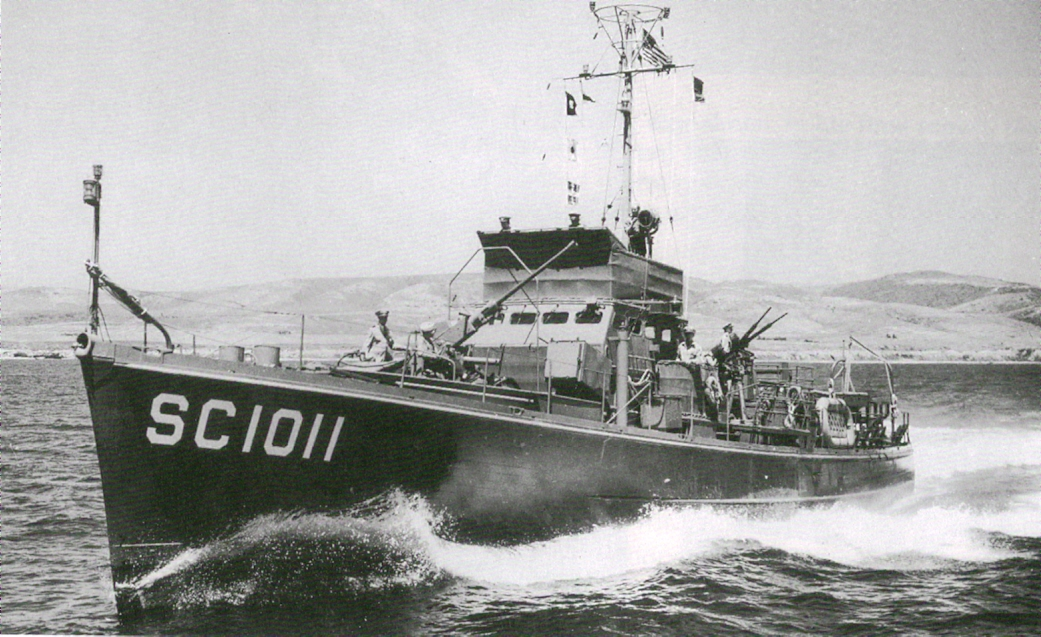
A US Navy 110-foot (34 m) submarine chaser in July 1943.

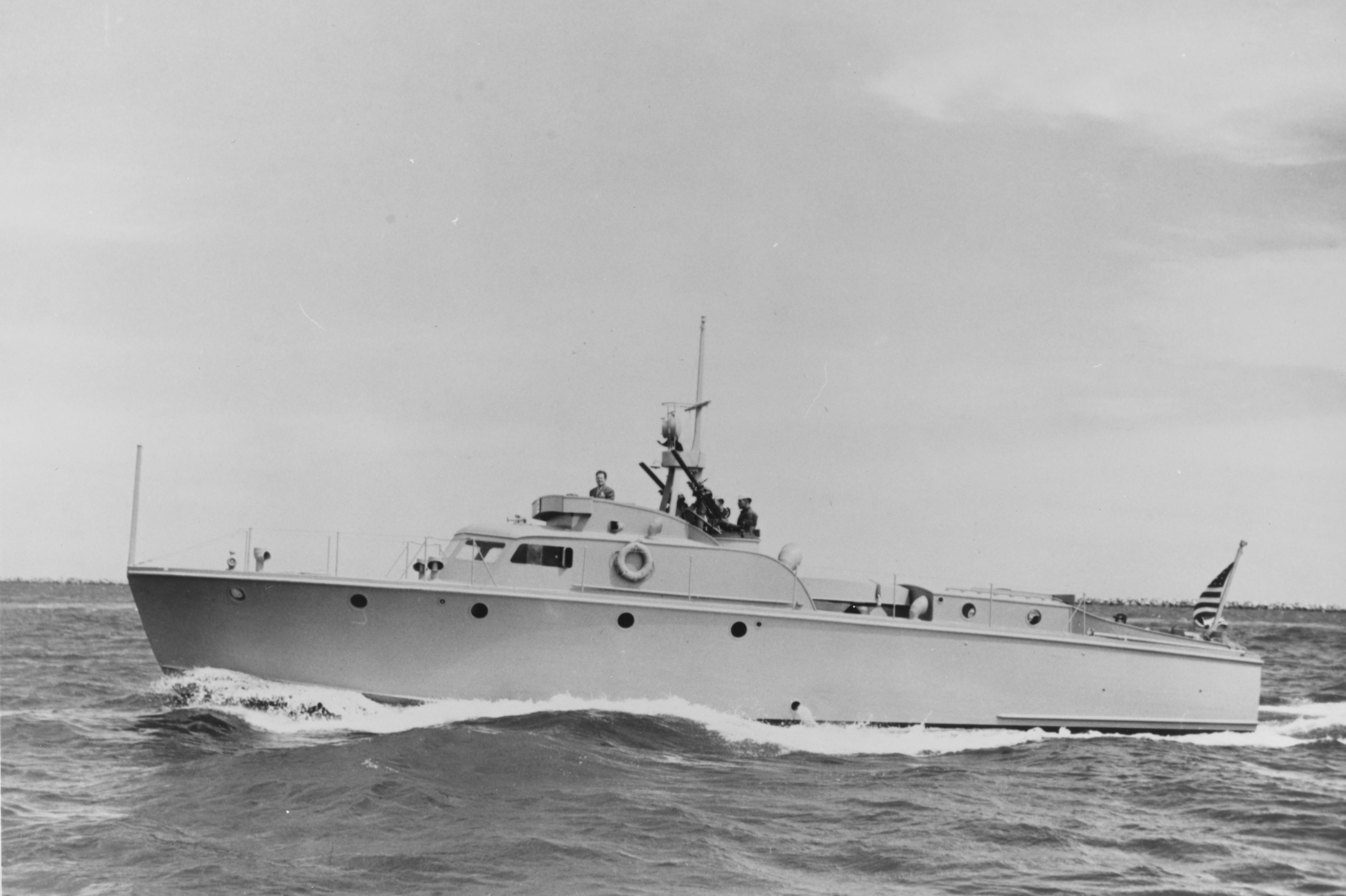
A US Navy 63-foot (19 m) air-sea rescue boat.

Harbor Boat Building Company was a shipbuilding company on Terminal Island in San Pedro, California. To support the World War II demand for ships General Engineering built: minesweepers, torpedo boats, submarine chasers, and air-sea rescue boats. In 1919 Romolo Rados founded Harbor Boat Building. After the war he renamed the company Harco Shipyard and built and sold a standard design motor boat. In 1959 he sold the company to LTV. The shipyard was closed and the company was sold again in 1971 to Omega-Alpha, Inc. The last ship built was in 1965 for the US Navy. The shipyard was located at 263 Wharf St, San Pedro.

== Adjutant-class minesweeper ==
Harbor Boat Building Company built Adjutant-class minesweepers, an auxiliary motor minesweepers for the United States Navy and other counties in the 1950s. The Adjutant class had a displacement of 330 long tons (340 t) light, 390 long tons (400 t) full load, a length of 138 ft (42 m), a beam of 27 ft (8.2 m) and a draft of 9 ft (2.7 m). Power was from four Packard 600 hp (450 kW) diesel engines, 2,400 hp (1,800 kW) total with two screws and a top speed of 13.6 knots (25.2 km/h; 15.7 mph). Armed with two 20 mm (0.8 in) Oerlikon cannons anti-aircraft (AA) guns. Built: Peacock, Phoebe, Aconite (M 640), Azalée (M 668), Camélia (M 671), Ulvsund (M 577), Vilsund (M 578), Geumsan/Kum San (MSC 522), Goheung/Ko Hung (MSC 523), Geumdok/Kum Kok (MSC 525), Yeongdong/Kyong Dong (MSC 529) and Okcheon/Ok Cheon (MSC 530).

== Pipit-class coastal minesweeper ==
Harbor Boat Building Company built Pipit-class coastal minesweepers. The ships had a displacement of 210 long tons (213 t), a length of 85 ft 4 in (26.01 m), a beam of 23 ft 4 in (7.11 m). Power of a diesel engine with one shaft and a top speed of 10 knots (19 km/h; 12 mph). Armed with two .30 cal (7.62 mm) machine guns. Built: USS Magpie, USS Plover.

== Yard patrol boat ==
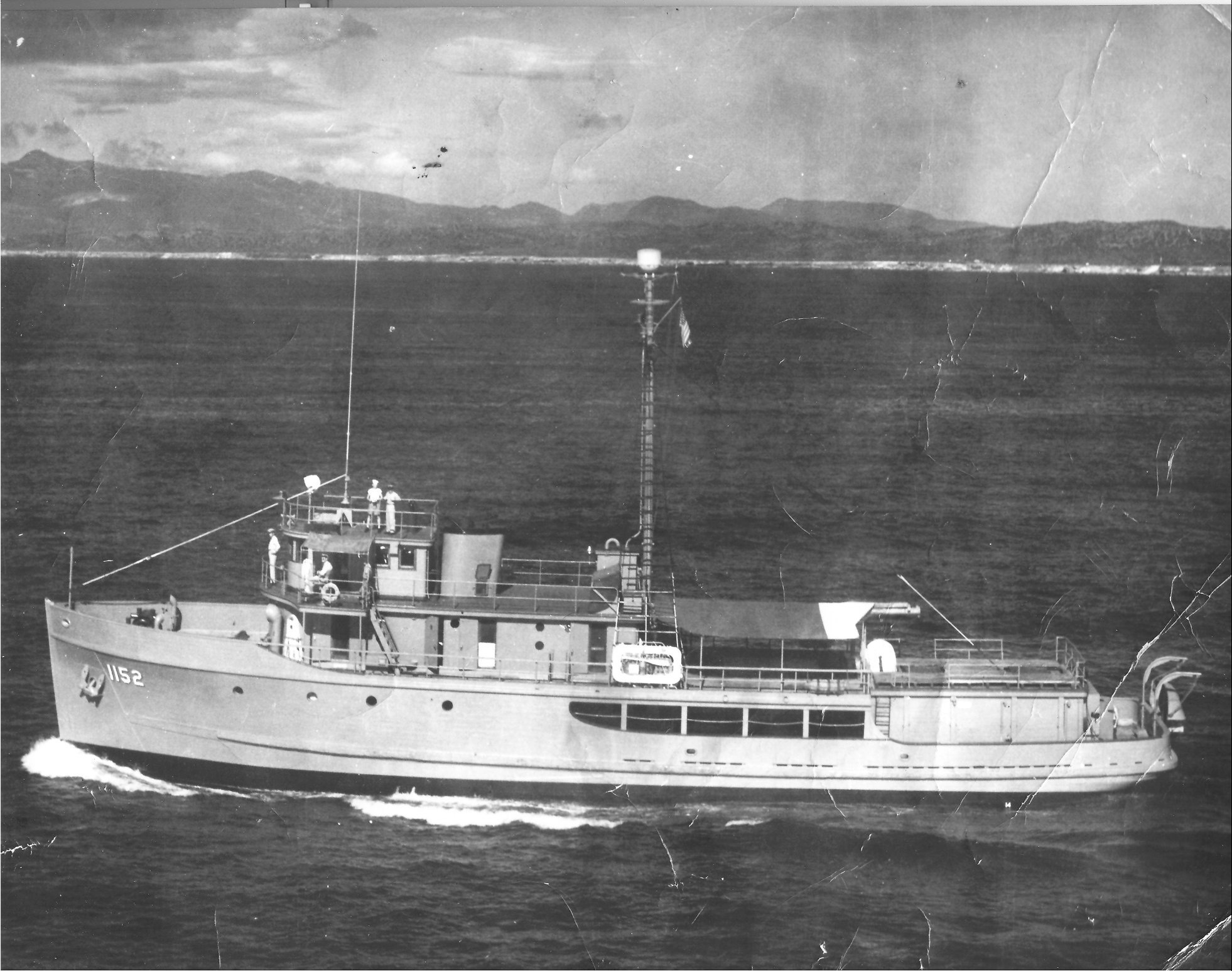
A 128-foot (39 m) yard patrol boat in 1952

Harbor Boat Building Company built two yard patrol boats, YP-617 and YP-618. Finished as reefer ships, small refrigerated cargo vessels to supply fresh food to small islands in the South Pacific. Over 250 tons of refrigerated cargo could be carried in ten wood and four steel refrigerated wells. The ship housed three officers and twenty men. The ships were converted to tuna ships after the war. The boats had a length of 128 feet (39 m), beam of 30 feet (9.1 m), and a draft of 14 feet (4.3 m). They were armed with three 20 mm AA gun mounts and propelled by a single propeller creating 560 shaft horsepower (420 kW).

== Air-sea rescue boat ==
Harbor Boat Building Company built in 1944 US Navy air-sea rescue boats, also called a crash boat (ARB), were: Model 314 at 23 long tons (23 t), length of 63 ft (19 m), beam of 15 ft 4 in (4.67 m), draft of 4 ft (1.2 m). Powered by 630 hp (470 kW) Hall-Scott Defender V12 petrol engines with a top speed of 31.5 knots (58.3 km/h; 36.2 mph). They had a crew of 7 or 8 and were armed with two .50 cal. M2 Browning machine guns. The boats had two rigid 795-US-gallon (3,010 L; 662 imp gal) United States Rubber Company bullet sealing fuel tanks. They were a speed boat used to rescue pilots, crew and passengers from downed aircraft in search and rescue, air-sea rescue missions.

== Submarine chaser ==
Harbor Boat Building Company built submarine chasers that were of the SC-497-class design. They had a displacement of 94 tons with a length of 110 feet (34 m), a beam of 17 feet (5.2 m), a draft of 6 feet (1.8 m), and a top speed of 21 knots (39 km/h; 24 mph). They had a crew of 28. The sub chasers were powered by two 1,540 brake horsepower (1,150 kW) General Motors, Electro-Motive Division, 16-184A diesel engines, and two propellers. They were armed with one Bofors 40 mm gun, two Browning M2 .50 cal. machine guns, two depth charge projector "Y guns", and two depth charge tracks. Some of the submarine chasers were lent to Allies of the United States as part of the Lend-Lease program.

== Motor Torpedo Boat ==
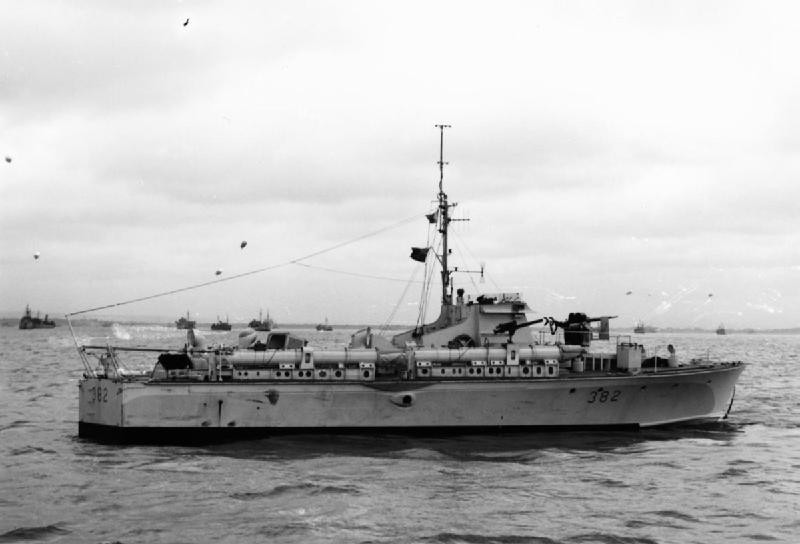
British Motor Torpedo Boat, 73 feet (22 m) with 18-inch (460 mm) torpedoes

Harbor Boat Building Company built Motor Torpedo Boats (BPT) in 1943. These had a displacement of 49 tons, a length of 73 feet (22 m), and a top speed of 40 knots (74 km/h; 46 mph). The BPTs were armed with two 18-inch (460 mm) torpedoes, one 20 mm gun and two .303 cal Vickers machine guns. Power was from three 1,500 shp (1,100 kW) Packard W-14 M2500 gasoline engines with three shafts. Built for the US Navy as BPT boats, they were reclassified to HM MTB for the use as British Motor Torpedo Boats.

== Notable incidents ==
- SC 723 hull# 152, a 110-foot (34 m) US Navy sub chaser sank in a typhoon on its way to Taiwan on August 27, 1948. She was commissioned as the USS PC-723 on December 7, 1942.

== See also ==
- California during World War II
- Maritime history of California
- Wooden boats of World War 2
- Cryer & Sons
