= USS Plover (AMc-3) =

Minesweeper of the United States Navy

History

United States
- Name: USS Plover
- Namesake: Plover
- Builder: Harbor Boat Building Co., Terminal Island, California
- Launched: 1936, as M/V Sea Rover
- Acquired: 16 October 1940
- Commissioned: 25 June 1941, as USS Plover (AMc-3)
- Decommissioned: 17 September 1944
- Stricken: 14 October 1944
- Fate: Transferred to the Maritime Commission for return to her owner, 5 February 1945

General characteristics
- Class & type: Pipit class coastal minesweeper
- Displacement: 197 long tons (200 t)
- Length: 85 ft 6 in (26.06 m)
- Beam: 22 ft 6 in (6.86 m)
- Draft: 9 ft 5 in (2.87 m)
- Propulsion: Diesel engine, one shaft
- Speed: 10 knots (19 km/h; 12 mph)
- Complement: 17
- Armament: 2 × .30 cal (7.62 mm) machine guns

USS Plover (AMc-3) was a Pipit-class coastal minesweeper acquired by the United States Navy for use in World War II. Her task was to clear minefields in coastal waterways.

Plover was originally built by Harbor Boat Building Co., Terminal Island, Long Beach, California in 1936 as the wooden hull fishing trawler M/V Sea Rover. She was purchased on 16 October 1940 from Mr. John Rados, converted to a coastal minesweeper at Martinolich Shipbuilding Company., San Pedro, California and placed in service on 25 June 1941.

== World War II West Coast Operations ==
Based at San Pedro, California, Plover performed sweeping and patrol duties along the coast until placed out of service on 17 September 1944.

== Decommissioned ==
Struck from the Navy List on 14 October 1944, she was transferred to the Maritime Commission on 5 February 1945 and was returned to her former owner the same date.
