= USS Widgeon (AMS-208) =

Minesweeper of the United States Navy

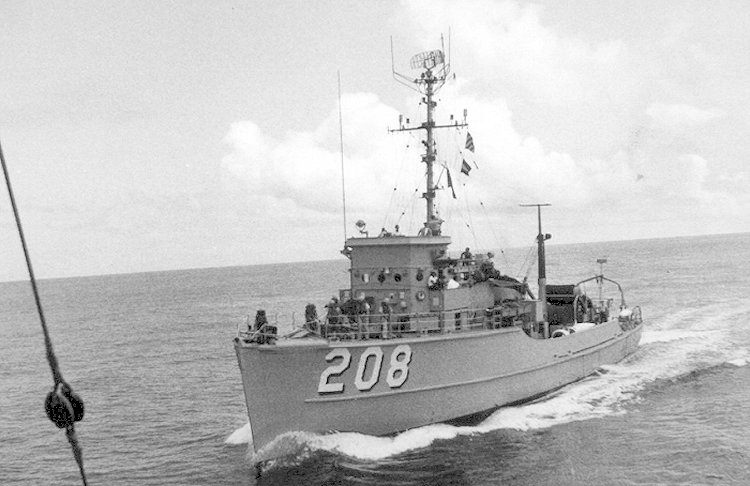
- USS Widgeon (MSC-208) coming alongside Warbler.

History

United States
- Name: Widgeon
- Namesake: Widgeon
- Builder: Bellingham Shipyards, Bellingham, Washington
- Laid down: 3 May 1954
- Launched: 15 October 1954
- Commissioned: 16 November 1955
- Decommissioned: 10 October 1969
- Reclassified: Coastal Minesweeper, 7 February 1955
- Stricken: 2 July 1973
- Identification: Hull symbol: AMS-208; Hull symbol: MSC-208
- Honors and awards: 6 × engagement stars (Vietnam); Meritorious Unit Commendation (Vietnam)
- Fate: Sold for scrap, January 1974

General characteristics
- Class & type: Bluebird-class minesweeper
- Displacement: 412 long tons (419 t)
- Length: 145 ft (44 m)
- Beam: 28 ft (8.5 m)
- Draft: 12 ft (3.7 m)
- Installed power: 2 × General Motors 880 horsepower (660 kW) 8-268A diesel engines; 1,760 horsepower (1,310 kW)
- Propulsion: Snow and Knobstedt single reduction gear; 2 × screws
- Speed: 12.8 kn (23.7 km/h; 14.7 mph)
- Complement: 40
- Armament: 2 × 20 mm (0.8 in) Oerlikon cannons anti-aircraft (AA) mounts; 2 × caliber .50 in (12.7 mm) machine guns; 1 × 81 mm mortar

USS Widgeon (AMS/MSC-208) was a Bluebird-class minesweeper acquired by the US Navy for clearing coastal minefields.

== Construction ==
Widgeon was laid down on 3 May 1954, as AMS-208 by Bellingham Shipyards, Bellingham, Washington; launched on 15 October 1954; sponsored by Mrs. John F. Cushing, the wife of the treasurer of the Bellingham Shipyards; reclassified MSC-208, on 7 February 1955; and commissioned at the naval station at Tacoma, Washington, on 16 November 1955.

== West Coast service ==
Ready for sea on 15 December 1955, Widgeon, a unit of the Pacific Fleet Mine Force, sailed on 3 January 1956, for visits to San Francisco and Long Beach, California. The new minesweeper operated out of the latter port until 29 January, at which time she shifted to San Diego to undergo shakedown training. Upon completion of shakedown, the ship underwent a four-week availability at the Long Beach Naval Shipyard.

The ship underwent further trials and alterations before she sailed to the Western Pacific Ocean (WestPac) on 1 October 1956. Proceeding in company with Mine Division (MinDiv) 95, Widgeon reported to Commander, Naval Forces, Far East (ComNavFE) for duty and was assigned to MinDiv 32, Mine Squadron 3, Mine Flotilla 1.

== Western Pacific service ==
Homeported at Sasebo, Japan, Widgeon operated in the Far East for the next 13 years. During that time, she participated in local operations in Japanese waters, as well as voyages to Korea and Okinawa for exercises. She conducted joint minesweeping operations and exercises with units of the Japanese, Republic of Korea, and Taiwan navies, and visited ports such as Kobe, Yokosuka, Nagasaki, Kagoshima, Aburatsu, Beppu, Kochi, Tsushima, and Maisuru, Japan; Kaohsiung, Taiwan; Hong Kong; Buckner Bay; Subic Bay, Philippines; and Pohang and Koje Do, Korea. Interspersed with her active training evolutions, the minesweeper underwent routine periods of upkeep and alterations and repairs at her home port of Sasebo.

=== Vietnam War service ===
Participation in the increasing American involvement in the Vietnam War, however, highlighted the minesweeper's lengthy WestPac deployment. From the mid-1960s, the ship commenced a regular schedule of deployments on "Operation Market Time" patrol stations in the coastal waters off South Vietnam, on patrol and interdiction to cut off the seaborne flow of supplies to the communist Viet Cong forces inside South Vietnam. During one such cruise in January 1967, while being diverted from an "Operation Market Time" patrol to conduct classified operations in the Gulf of Tonkin, the ship made the national news when she was rammed by a swordfish. Later during that same cruise, while the ship was crossing the South China Sea, she sighted a McDonnell F4-C Phantom crash into the sea. Widgeon altered course in time to rescue one man of the two-man crew. The other flier, the pilot, died in the crash. Commander, Naval Forces, Philippines, later cited Widgeon for her outstanding performance of duty during the rescue.

Widgeon returned to Sasebo on 17 February 1967, worn and beaten from heavy seas, and was under repairs during March and April. On 1 May, a Navy P-3 Orion patrol plane, with a crew of 12 men on board, crashed in the Tsushima Strait off the southern coast of Korea. Widgeon headed for the scene of the crash, transiting the hazardous Hirado Strait for search and rescue (SAR) operations. She searched for two days and recovered numerous bits of debris but was unable to locate any survivors or the fuselage of the plane. The minesweeper ultimately returned to Sasebo on 5 May, to commence refresher training.

Widgeon spent the months of July through September, on her sixth "Market Time" patrol and a cruise in the South China Sea. Departing Sasebo on 3 July, the minesweeper arrived at Bangkok, Thailand, on 15 July. She later operated with mine countermeasures units of the Royal Thai Navy in the Gulf of Thailand in a SEATO exercise, "Sea Dog," before she operated on "Operation Market Time" stations from 27 July to 12 September. When she arrived at Kaohsiung, Taiwan, on 16 September, the ship's crew had not touched land in 60 days. Widgeon subsequently spent the rest of the year engaged in local operations out of Sasebo and Buckner Bay, Okinawa, and made a visit to Hong Kong for rest and recreation.

Over the next two years, Widgeon continued her operations in the Far East and Southeast Asian waters. During that time, she conducted two "Operation Market Time" patrols for which she later received the Meritorious Unit Commendation. The award, given the ship on 16 August 1970, was for the period from 1 June 1968 to 13 September 1969. During that time, Widgeon served with the Mine Countermeasures Ready Group and Coastal Surveillance Forces in combat operations off the coast of South Vietnam. She maintained a consistently high standard of readiness that enabled her to assume assigned duties early or on very short notice, and she completed three stints on "Operation Market Time" patrol stations. She not only inspected or boarded over 1,100 vessels but, on occasion, returned "hostile" fire from shore and conducted underwater searches. Throughout the repeated patrol extensions, "the continually outstanding performance, high state of morale, preparedness, and ingenuity of the officers and men of USS Widgeon attested to their exceptional team spirit and professionalism. By their exemplary courage and dedication, they contributed significantly to the success of anti-infiltration efforts in the Republic of Vietnam and enhanced the reputation of the Mine Countermeasures Ready Group, thereby reflecting credit upon themselves and the United States Naval Service."

Ultimately, after 13 years of continuous service in WestPac operating areas, Widgeon sailed for the United States on 17 August 1969, in company with Catskill, Vireo, and Warbler. Proceeding via Pearl Harbor, she arrived at Long Beach exactly one month later.

== Decommissioning ==
Later that autumn, on 1 October 1969, Widgeon was decommissioned and placed in reserve; she got underway the next day for her new home port, San Diego. For the next three years, Widgeon operated as a Group II Naval Reserve training (NET) ship. She operated primarily in the San Diego area, but twice visited Ensenada, Mexico, once in 1972, and once in 1973. Struck from the Navy list on 2 July 1973, Widgeon was sold in January 1974.

== Awards ==
Widgeon earned six engagement stars for her Vietnam service and a Meritorious Unit Commendation.

== Notes ==
Citations

== Bibliography ==
Online resources

- "Widgeon II (MSC-208)". Dictionary of American Naval Fighting Ships. Naval History and Heritage Command. 2 November 2015. This article incorporates text from this source, which is in the public domain.
- "Widgeon (MSC-208)". NavSource.
