= USS Magpie (AMc-2) =

Minesweeper of the United States Navy

History

United States
- Name: USS Magpie
- Namesake: Magpie
- Builder: Harbor Boat Building Co., Terminal Island, California
- Launched: 1936, as FV City of San Pedro
- Acquired: 18 October 1940
- Commissioned: 28 March 1941, as USS Magpie (AMc-2)
- Decommissioned: 6 October 1944
- Renamed: Magpie, 29 October 1940
- Stricken: 22 December 1944
- Fate: Transferred to the War Shipping Administration, 5 February 1945

General characteristics
- Class & type: Pipit-class coastal minesweeper
- Displacement: 210 long tons (213 t)
- Length: 85 ft 4 in (26.01 m)
- Beam: 23 ft 4 in (7.11 m)
- Propulsion: Diesel engine, one shaft
- Speed: 10 knots (19 km/h; 12 mph)
- Armament: 2 × .30 cal (7.62 mm) machine guns

USS Magpie (AMc-2) was a Pipit-class coastal minesweeper acquired by the United States Navy for use in World War II. Her task was to clear minefields in coastal waterways.

Magpie was built as FV City of San Pedro in 1936 by Harbor Boat Building Co., Terminal Island, California; acquired by the U.S. Navy on 18 October 1940; converted from a fishing trawler by Harbor Boat Building Co.; renamed Magpie on 29 October 1940; and placed in service on 28 March 1941.

== World War II West Coast operations ==
Assigned to the 15th Naval District, Magpie departed San Pedro, California, on 10 May 1941 for the Panama Canal Zone, arriving 22 May. She performed minesweeping and patrol operations out of Balboa, Panama, until 7 August 1944 when she departed for the west coast, arriving San Diego, California, on 26 August.

== Decommissioning ==
Magpie was placed out of service at San Pedro, California, on 6 October 1944; struck from the Navy List on 22 December 1944; and delivered to War Shipping Administration for return sale to her former owner on 5 February 1945.
