= USS Vireo (MSC-205) =

Minesweeper of the United States Navy

History

United States
- Name: Vireo
- Namesake: Vireo
- Builder: Bellingham Shipyards, Bellingham, Washington
- Laid down: 14 September 1953
- Launched: 30 April 1954
- Commissioned: 7 June 1955
- Decommissioned: 1 October 1970
- In service: 1 October 1970
- Out of service: 1 April 1975
- Reclassified: Coastal Minesweeper, 7 February 1955
- Stricken: 1 July 1975
- Identification: Hull symbol: AMS-205; Hull symbol: MSC-205
- Fate: Transferred to the Republic of Fiji, 1 October 1975

Republic of Fiji
- Name: Kula
- Acquired: 1 October 1975
- Identification: Hull sumbol: MSC-205
- Fate: Discarded 1985

General characteristics
- Class & type: Bluebird-class minesweeper
- Displacement: 412 long tons (419 t)
- Length: 145 ft (44 m)
- Beam: 28 ft (8.5 m)
- Draft: 12 ft (3.7 m)
- Installed power: 2 × General Motors 880 horsepower (660 kW) 8-268A diesel engines; 1,760 horsepower (1,310 kW)
- Propulsion: Snow and Knobstedt single reduction gear; 2 × screws
- Speed: 13 kn (24 km/h; 15 mph)
- Complement: 39
- Armament: 2 × 20 mm (0.8 in) Oerlikon cannons anti-aircraft (AA) mounts; 2 × caliber .50 in (12.7 mm) machine guns; 1 × 81 mm mortar

USS Vireo (AMS/MSC-205) was a Bluebird-class minesweeper acquired by the US Navy for clearing coastal minefields.

== Construction ==
Vireo was laid down 14 September 1953, by Bellingham Shipyards, Bellingham, Washington; launched on 30 April 1954, as AMS-205; sponsored by Mrs. Arvin E. Olsen; reclassified as MSC-205, on 7 February 1955; and commissioned on 7 June 1955.

== West Coast operations ==
After completing tests and trials at Seattle, Vireo moved south at the beginning of July, for shakedown training out of San Diego. The cruise occupied her until the second week in September, at which time she began preparations for final acceptance trials to be conducted early in November. Upon passing those tests on 4 November, Vireo became an active unit of Mine Squadron (MinRon) 7. She operated from Long Beach, California, until 1 March 1956, when she stood out of that port, bound for the western Pacific. En route, she stopped at Pearl Harbor and, for the remainder of March, and the entire month of April, the minesweeper conducted training operations in Hawaiian waters. She resumed her voyage westward on 9 May, and arrived in Yokosuka, Japan, on 31 May.

== Western Pacific service ==
Vireo served at Sasebo, Japan, as a unit of MinRon for almost a decade and one-half. Her 14 years and months in the Far East can be divided into two easily discernible periods. The first eight years, from June 1956 to July 1964, were devoted entirely to peace time operations out of Sasebo. These included minesweeping exercises with other ships of the United States Navy and with units of the Japanese Maritime Self Defense Force as well as with navies of the Republic of Korea, Taiwan, and Thailand. She visited such diverse places as the Sea of Japan, the coast of Korea, the Philippine Islands, Okinawa, and the East and South China Seas. She punctuated her operations with port calls at Hong Kong, Okinawa, Keelung and Kaphsiung on Taiwan, Subic and Manila Bay in the Philippines, and at a host of Japanese ports including, among others, Beppu, Kobe, Kagoshima, Sasebo, and Yokosuka. The visits allowed her crew to rest after operations at sea, to replenish stores and supplies, and to refurbish the ship. During the crisis in 1958, over the Nationalist-held islands of Quemoy and Matsu, located just off the communist China, Vireo rushed from Japan to join American forces in the area and spent the months of September and October, patrolling near the islands. In November, she resumed her routine peacetime minesweeping exercises, port calls, and occasional salvage or rescue operations. Activities such as these characterized her duty until mid-summer 1964.

=== Vietnam War service ===
The war in Vietnam dominated Vireo's final six years in the Far East. In July 1964, just before the Tonkin Gulf incident gave impetus to an ever-widening American participation in combat in Vietnam, the minesweeper headed for Southeast Asian waters for a series of "special operations." Though she resumed her normal schedule early in August, the minesweeper began regular tours of duty on station off the South Vietnamese coast the following spring when an inshore patrol was established, under the code name Operation Market Time, to interdict the waterborne flow of arms to the Viet Cong insurgents. In carrying out her "Market Time" duties, Vireo patrolled stretches of the South Vietnamese coast relatively close inshore and stopped suspicious-looking craft, mostly junks but occasionally trawlers, to check their identity and to inspect cargoes and crews for illicit arms and communist infiltrators. During her first year on the patrol, she conducted five tours of duty, each of about two or three weeks duration, on junk surveillance assignments uncomplicated by any combat. Those periods were punctuated by port visits to her old haunts, normal mine exercises, and periods in port for upkeep and repair.

The year 1966, however, proved a different story altogether. After completing an overhaul at Sasebo, Vireo departed that port on 10 April, to resume "Market Time" patrols off the coast of South Vietnam. Exactly one month later, while engaged in those operations, the minesweeper received her baptism of fire. At about 04:30, Point Grey encountered a steel-hulled trawler trying to make a landfall near the mouth of the Cua Bo De River. The Coast Guard cutter received heavy .50-caliber gunfire when she tried to force the trawler to heave to for inspection but, while requesting assistance in the form of Brister and Vireo, succeeded in forcing the enemy ship aground. At a hasty conference on board Brister, it was decided to attempt to salvage the grounded gun runner. While Point Grey approached the trawler with a towline from Vireo, Brister launched her motor whaleboat to assist. The Coast Guard cutter received a withering machine gun fire from insurgents ashore as she neared the enemy. She answered that fire promptly, and Vireo joined in with 150 rounds of 20-millimetre (0.79 in). Brister, her battery masked by the cutter, could not bring her 3-inch (76 mm)/50 caliber guns to bear on the enemy. Ultimately, the Coast Guard cutter had to break contact and move off in order to get her wounded crewmen medical assistance. Vireo covered her retirement with more 20-millimeter fire and provided a haven for Brister's motor whaleboat while air strikes were called in to silence the enemy machine gun emplacements. Further air strikes eventually destroyed the trawler, and Vireo returned to "Market Time" duty. For participation in the action at Cua Bo De River, Vireo won the Navy Unit Commendation, and her commanding officer received the Bronze Star Medal.

== Decommissioning – Reserve ship ==
Over the next four and one-half years, Vireo maintained her schedule of "Market Time" patrols alternated with unilateral and multilateral mining exercises and port visits at various places throughout the Orient. On 1 August 1970, Vireo learned that her home port had been changed from Sasebo to Long Beach, where she was scheduled to begin duty as a Naval Reserve training ship on 1 October. She departed Sasebo on 17 August, and, after stops at Yokosuka and Pearl Harbor, arrived in Long Beach on 17 September. On 1 October, the minesweeper was placed out of commission. That same day, she departed Long Beach for her Naval Reserve duty station, Seattle.

== Transfer to the Fijian Navy ==
After four years and six months of operations along the northwest coast of the United States, Vireo began deactivation preparations on 1 April 1975. Three months later, on 1 July 1975, her name was struck from the Navy list. On 1 October 1975 she was transferred to the Fijian Navy and renamed Kula. She was discarded in 1985

== Notes ==
Citations

== Bibliography ==
Online resources

- "Vireo II (MSC-205)". Dictionary of American Naval Fighting Ships. Naval History and Heritage Command. 23 October 2015. This article incorporates text from this source, which is in the public domain.
- "USS Vireo (MSC-205)". NavSource.
