= Bellhop (company) =

- Type: Private
- Industry: Moving company
- Founded: 2011
- Headquarters: Chattanooga, Tennessee
- Key people: Juan Torres, CEO; Cameron Doody, Co-Founder & President; Stephen Vlahos, Founder
- Website: www.getbellhops.com

Bellhop is an American moving company that operates across the United States. It was previously known as Campus Bellhops when founded by Cam Doody and Stephen Vlahos in 2011. Based in Chattanooga, Tennessee, it provides moving services for small-scale moves.

== History ==
The initial concept of Bellhop was as a moving service for college students moving in and out of dorms. The company began moving college students during Auburn University's three-day freshman orientation weekend. It expanded to other college campuses the following year and also began servicing moves for off-campus apartments and homes, as well as servicing non-university customers.

At one time, Bellhop exclusively hired college students. To become a bellhop, applicants had to be at least 18 years old and currently enrolled in college, in addition to being physically able and strong. As of November 2018, Bellhop was serving 31 cities across 13 states, ranging from Arizona to Pennsylvania to Florida. As of 2024, Bellhop has outsourced both customer service and operations to a call center outside the United States.

== Recognition ==
Chattanooga mayor Andy Berke praised the company for "changing the way people think about moving".

== See also ==
- Allied Van Lines
