= Bell Boy (boat) =

The Bell Boy Boat Company was a division of the Bellingham Shipyards Co. of Bellingham, Washington set up by the shipyard owner Arch Talbot in 1952. Talbot was interested in creating a line of fiberglass boats, having worked with the material when the shipyard created of line of lifeboats for minesweepers in the Korean War called wherries. The company's use of fiberglass was pioneering; the material, despite having its commercial introduction in the 1930s, had seen limited use or interest until the postwar period. The Bell Boy line of boats, during the 1950s and 1960s, were considered to be one of the earliest types of fiberglass boats.
