= USS Peacock (MSC-198) =

Minesweeper of the United States Navy

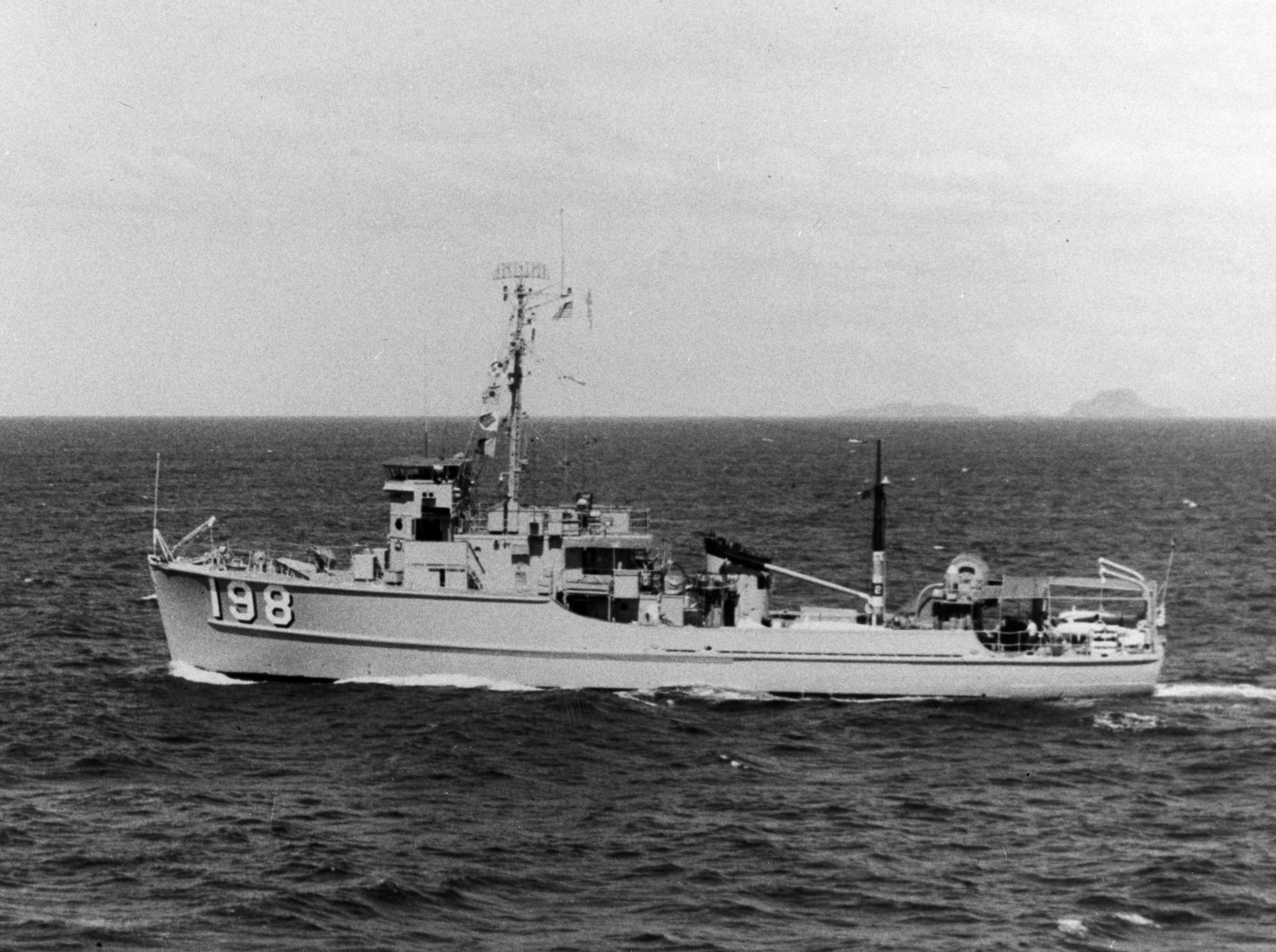

History

United States
- Name: Peacock
- Namesake: Peacock
- Builder: Harbor Boat Building Company, Terminal Island, California
- Laid down: 29 January 1953
- Launched: 19 June 1954
- Commissioned: 16 March 1955
- Reclassified: Coastal Minesweeper, 7 February 1955
- Stricken: 1 July 1975
- Identification: Hull symbol: AMS-198; Hull symbol: MSC-198
- Fate: Sold for scrap, 1 September 1976

General characteristics
- Class & type: Bluebird-class minesweeper
- Displacement: 362 long tons (368 t)
- Length: 144 ft 3 in (43.97 m)
- Beam: 27 ft 2 in (8.28 m)
- Draft: 12 ft (3.7 m)
- Installed power: 4 × Packard 600 hp (450 kW) diesel engines; 2,400 hp (1,800 kW)
- Propulsion: 2 × screws
- Speed: 13.6 kn (25.2 km/h; 15.7 mph)
- Complement: 40
- Armament: 2 × 20 mm (0.8 in) Oerlikon cannons anti-aircraft (AA) mounts

USS Peacock (AMS/MSC-198) was a Bluebird-class minesweeper in the United States Navy for clearing coastal minefields.

== Construction ==
Peacock was laid down 29 January 1953, as AMS-198, by the Harbor Boat Building Company, Terminal Island, California; launched, 19 June 1954; sponsored by Miss B. Rechenmacher; reclassified as a coastal minesweeper, MSC-198, 7 February 1955; commissioned 16 March 1955.

== Specifications ==
Coastal minesweeper nonmagnetic construction, wooden hull and stainless steel, aluminum, and bronze engine and hull fittings. Fitted with AN/UQS-1B sonar for mine hunting operations.

An interesting feature of Peacock was her non-magnetic construction, including all-wooden hull and stainless steel, aluminium and bronze engine and hull fittings. This unique construction rendered the ship safe from magnetic mines and was the reason for her very high initial cost of approximately $3,500.000.

== Pacific Ocean operations ==
Upon completion of fitting out, the Peacock conducted training and minesweeping exercises along the California coast until 4 February 1956, when she departed for her first deployment to the Far East.

== Vietnam operations ==
While overseas, Peacock participated in several joint exercises with Allied navies, participated in "Operation Market Time" off Vietnam and made port calls in the Far East. She has remained overseas since her first deployment and has continued in the same pattern as her first deployment into 1970.

Peacock was a coastal minesweeper capable of sweeping both moored and bottom sea mines of either contact or influence variety. The ship was the first of her class to be assigned to the U.S. 7th Fleet, and was homeported in Sasebo, Japan since 1956.

== Support during Lebanon and Taiwan crises ==
Peacock took part in the General emergency operations during the Lebanon emergency in the summer of 1958, and patrolled the Formosa Straits during the Taiwan crisis in the fall of 1958. As part of the U.S. 7th Fleet, Peacock stood ready and able at all times to do her part in maintaining the freedom of the seas.

== Far East tours and operations ==
Since her arrival in the Far East, homeported in Sasebo, Japan, Peacock traveled to such places as Hong Kong, Okinawa, Taiwan, the Philippines, Korea and the Ryukyu Islands, as well as numerous ports-of-call in Japan. She has regularly participated in Mine Exercises with the Navies of Japan, Korea, Nationalist China and the Republic of the Philippines. Peacock played an active role in Market Time Patrol off the coast line of Vietnam throughout the Vietnam War.

Lt. Michael A. McDevitt (later RADM) served on board as commanding officer from October 1968 to April 1971. He is the only commanding officer who remained aboard after making Lt.Cdr, which he pinned on in Subic Bay, January 1970.

== Decommissioning ==
Peacock was the last of the Sasebo-based MSC's to depart Japan. She headed for Long Beach, California just after Christmas, 1970, for further assignment as a Reserve training ship. Peacock sailed "unaccompanied" from Sasebo to Taiwan where she laid over for New Years 1971. She then sailed to Subic Bay, PI where she hooked up with four MSO class minesweepers for the transit east. Off Johnston Island Peacock detached from the other ships and headed to Pearl Harbor on her own. Following a short stay in Pearl Harbor she departed for the last leg of the transit to her new homeport of Long Beach, CA. The total transit took 57 days.

== Fate ==
Peacock was struck from the Naval Register, 1 July 1975 and disposed of through the Defense Reutilization and Marketing Service for scrap, 1 September 1976.

== Military awards and honors ==
Her crew was eligible for the following medals and ribbons:

- Armed Forces Expeditionary Medal (3)
- Combat Action Ribbon (1)
- Republic of Vietnam Meritorious Unit Citation for Gallantry (4)
- Vietnam Service Medal (8)

== Notes ==
Citations

== Bibliography ==
Online resources

- "Peacock III (AMS-198)". Dictionary of American Naval Fighting Ships. Naval History and Heritage Command. 19 August 2015. This article incorporates text from this source, which is in the public domain.
- "USS Peacock (MSC-198)". NavSource.

Also, 1970-1971 crew accounts
