= United States Fleet Activities Sasebo =

U.S. Naval base in Japan

Coordinates: 33°09′46″N 129°42′41″E

- Sasebo, Japan
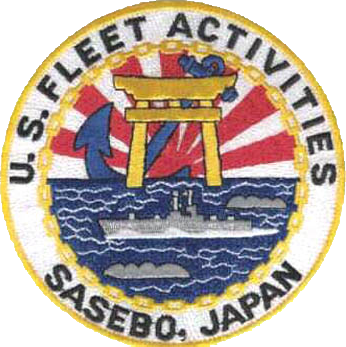

Site information
- Type: Naval Base
- Owner: United States of America; Japan
- Controlled by: United States Navy

Garrison information
- Current commander: Captain Michael Fontaine

U.S. Fleet Activities Sasebo is a United States Navy base, in Sasebo, Japan, on the island of Kyūshū. It provides facilities for the logistic support of forward-deployed units and visiting operating forces of the United States Pacific Fleet and designated tenant activities.

== History ==
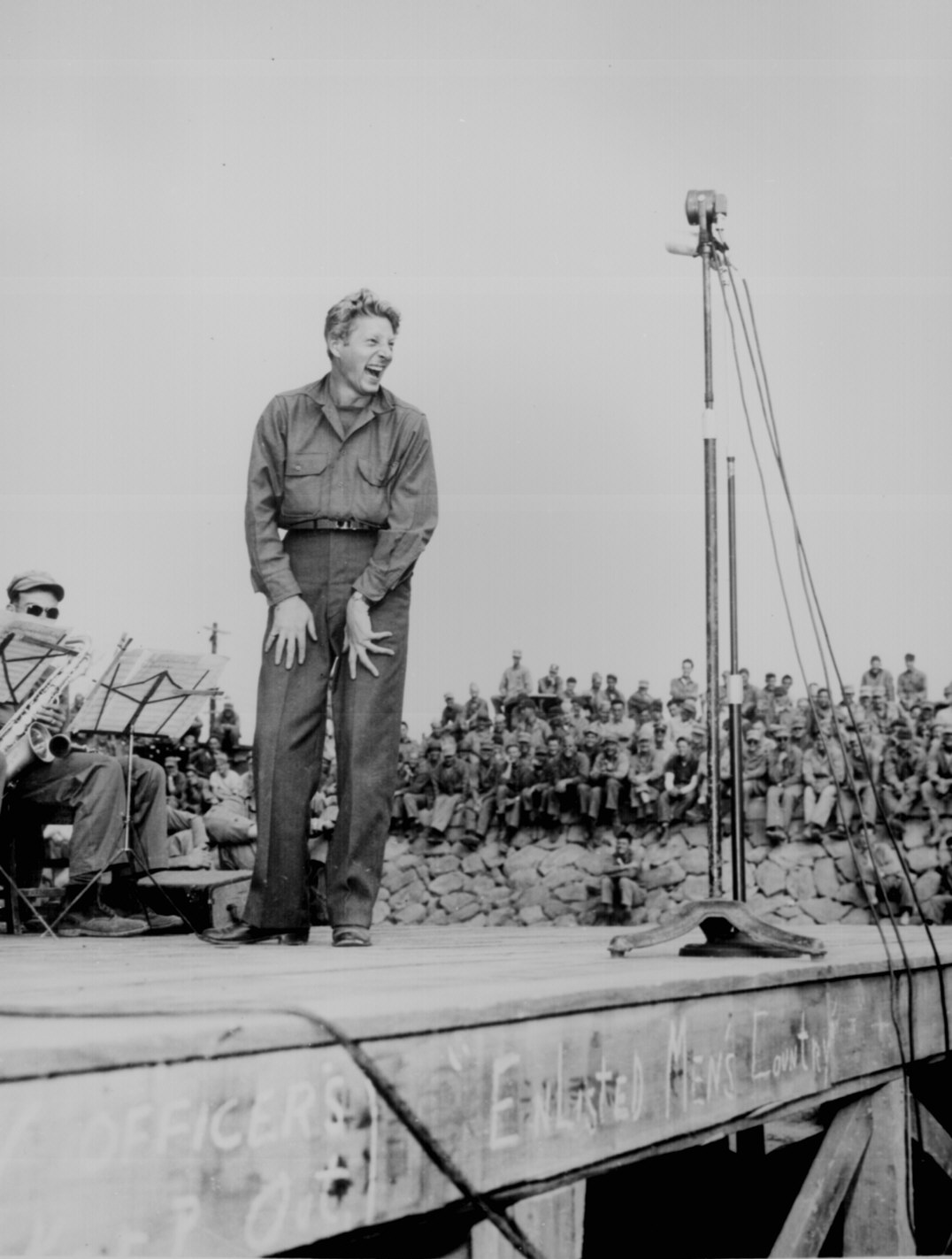
Danny Kaye entertains US military personnel at Sasebo on 25 October 1945

Sasebo has been a naval base since 1883, when Lieutenant Commander Tōgō Heihachirō nominated the small fishing village to form the nucleus of a base for the Imperial Japanese Navy. In 1905, ships of the Japanese Navy under Admiral Togo sailed from Sasebo to combat the Russian Baltic Fleet, leading to victory for Togo at the Battle of Tsushima.

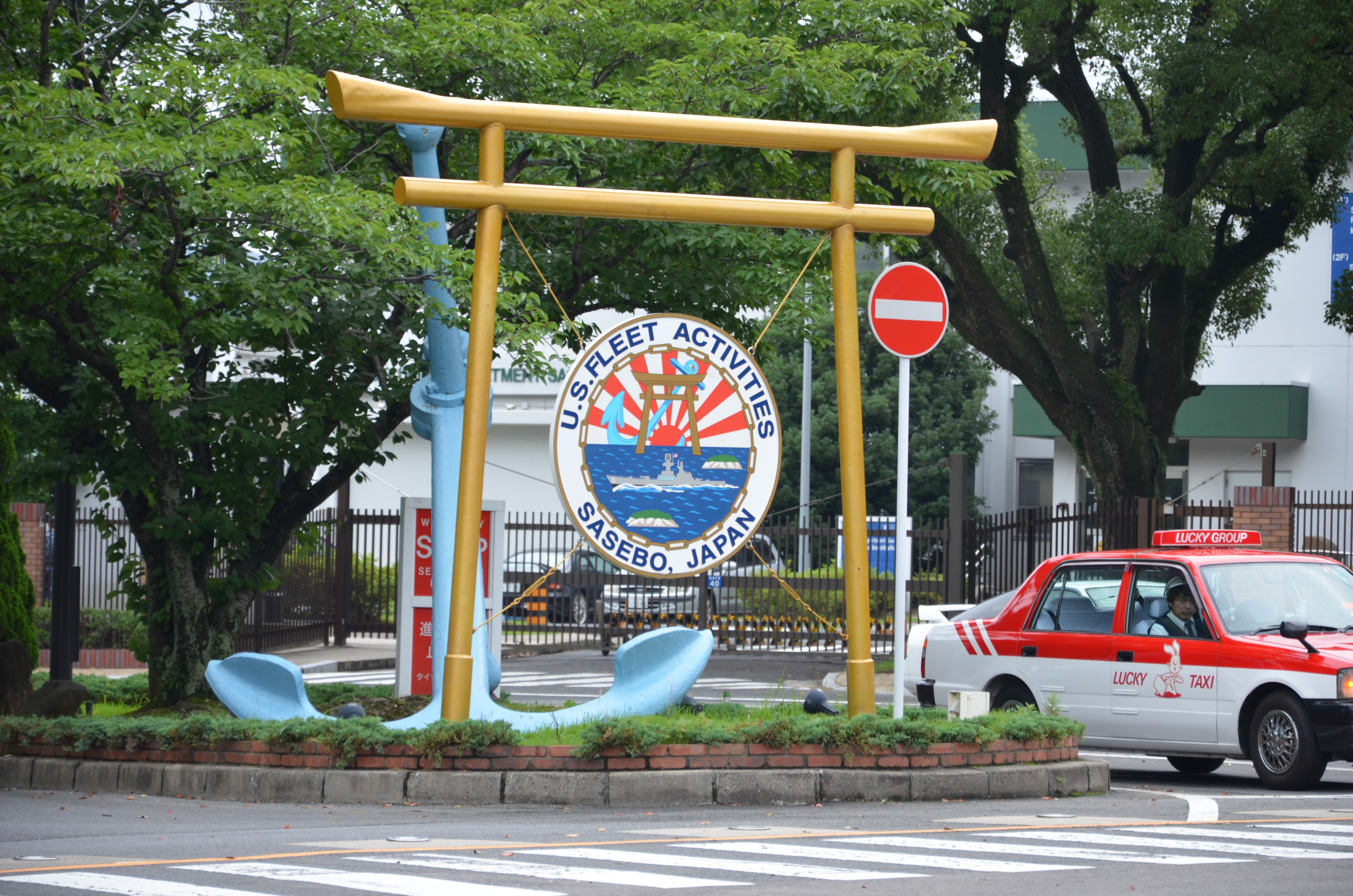
Logo displayed on the front gate of US Fleet Activities-Sasebo, Japan

The Imperial Japanese Navy had approximately 60,000 people working in the dock yard and associated naval stations at the peak of World War II, outfitting ships, submarines and aircraft. Sasebo was a popular liberty port for navy personnel.

In September 1945, the U.S. Marine Corps' Fifth Division landed at Sasebo, and in June 1946, U.S. Fleet Activities Sasebo was established.

When war broke out in Korea three years later, Sasebo became the main launching point for the United Nations and the U.S. Forces. Millions of tons of ammunition, fuel, tanks, trucks and supplies flowed through Sasebo on their way to the U.N. Forces in Korea. The number of Americans in Sasebo grew to about 20,000, and some 100 warships and freighters per day swelled the foreign populations still more.

After the Korean War ended, the Japan Self-Defense Forces were formed, and Japan Maritime Self-Defense Force ships began to homeport in Sasebo (Sasebo District Force). The U.S. Fleet Activities continued to support ships of the U.S. Seventh Fleet. Service Force ships made Sasebo their homeport.

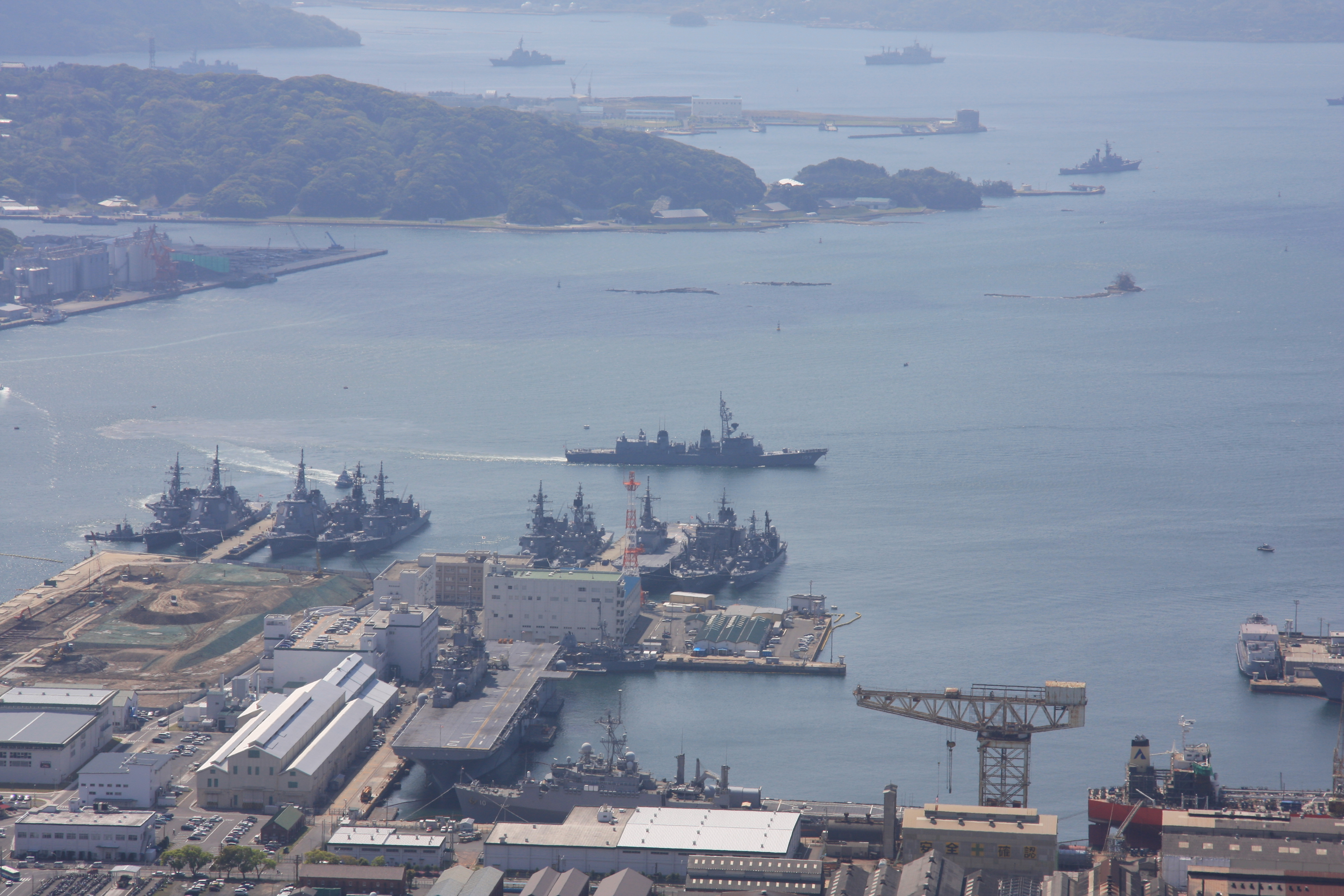
USFA Sasebo looking south, 2008

The U.S. Fleet Activities Sasebo provided heavy support to the expanded Seventh Fleet during the years of war in Southeast Asia. In the mid-seventies, the U.S. Fleet Activities Sasebo became the Naval Ordnance Facility Sasebo, and fleet visits dwindled to a low level.

On 4 July 1980, this trend was reversed when U.S. Fleet Activities Sasebo regained its name, and Seventh Fleet ships were once again forward-deployed to Sasebo.

U.S. Fleet Activities Sasebo played a vital logistics role in Operation Desert Shield/Storm during 1990–91, by serving as a supply point for ordnance and fuel for ships and Marines operating in the Persian Gulf theater.

Sasebo was expanded as a result of the East Asian foreign policy of the Barack Obama administration, with a doubling of the number of LCACs stationed there.

== Current ships permanently forward deployed ==
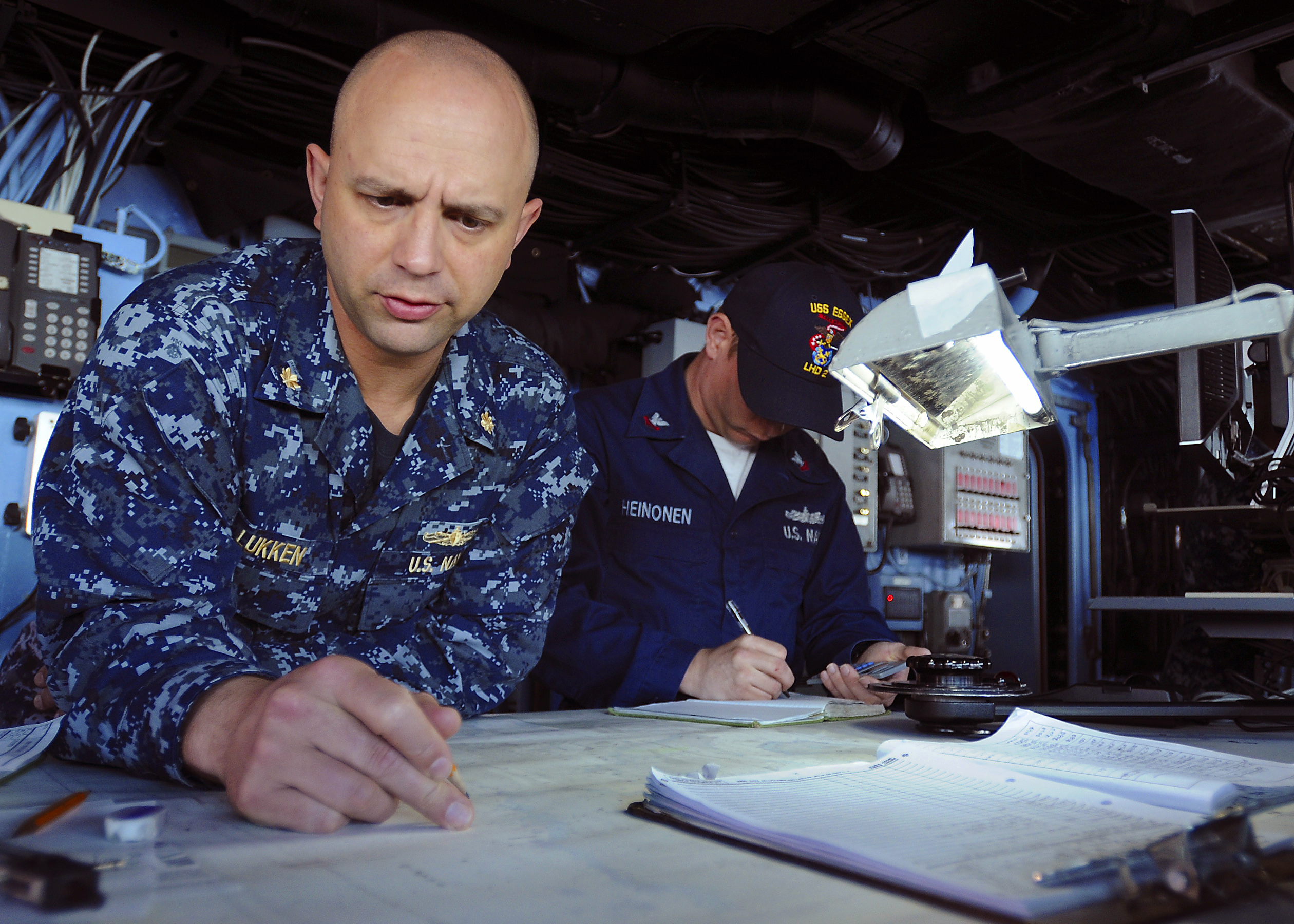
Cmdr. Mark Lukken plots a course on the chart table aboard the forward-deployed amphibious assault ship USS Essex (LHD-2), SASEBO, Japan (8 June 2010)

Commander Amphibious Squadron 11 (COMPHIBRON 11)

- USS Tripoli (LHA-7) (since 2025)
- USS New Orleans (LPD-18) (since 2019)
- USS Rushmore (LSD-47) (since 2021)
- USS San Diego (LPD-22) (since 2024)

Commander Mine Countermeasure Squadron 7 (COMCMRON 7)

- USS Patriot (MCM-7) (since 1994)
- USS Pioneer (MCM-9) (since 2014)
- USS Warrior (MCM-10) (since 2014)
- USS Chief (MCM-14) (since 2014)

== Ships formerly permanently forward deployed to Sasebo, Japan ==
- USS Mars (AFS-1)
- USS Niagara Falls (AFS-3)
- USS White Plains (AFS-4)
- USS Passumpsic (AO-107)
- USS Hassayampa (AO-145)
- USS Ajax (AR-6) (1960–1970)
- USS Beaufort (ATS-2)
- USS Brunswick (ATS-3)
- USS Belleau Wood (LHA-3) (1992–2000)
- USS St. Louis (LKA-116)
- USS Dubuque (LPD-8) (1985–1999)
- USS Juneau (LPD-10) (1999–2008)
- USS Harpers Ferry (LSD-49) (2002–2011)
- USS Fort McHenry (LSD-43) (1995–2006)
- USS Tortuga (LSD-46) (2006–2013)
- USS San Bernardino (LST-1189)
- USS Epping Forest (LSD-4/MCS-7)
- USS Darter (SS-576) (1979–1989)
- USS Barbel (SS-580) (1985–1989)
- USS Surfbird (ADG-383)
- USS Essex (LHD-2) (2000–2012)
- USS Bonhomme Richard (LHD-6) (2012–2018)
- USS Denver (LPD-9) (2008–2014)
- USS Guardian (MCM-5) (1996–2013)
- USS Germantown (LSD-42) (2011 – 2021)
- USS Avenger (MCM-1) (2009–2014)
- USS Defender (MCM-2) (2009– 2014)
- USS Whippoorwill (MSC-207)
- USS Woodpecker (MSC-209)
- USS Albatross (MSC-289)
- USS Peacock (MSC-198)
- USNS Safeguard (T-ARS-50)
- USS Catskill (MCS-1)
- USS Wasp (LHD-1) (2018–2019)
- USS Green Bay (LPD-20) (2015-2024)
- USS America (LHA-6) (2019-2025)

== Education ==
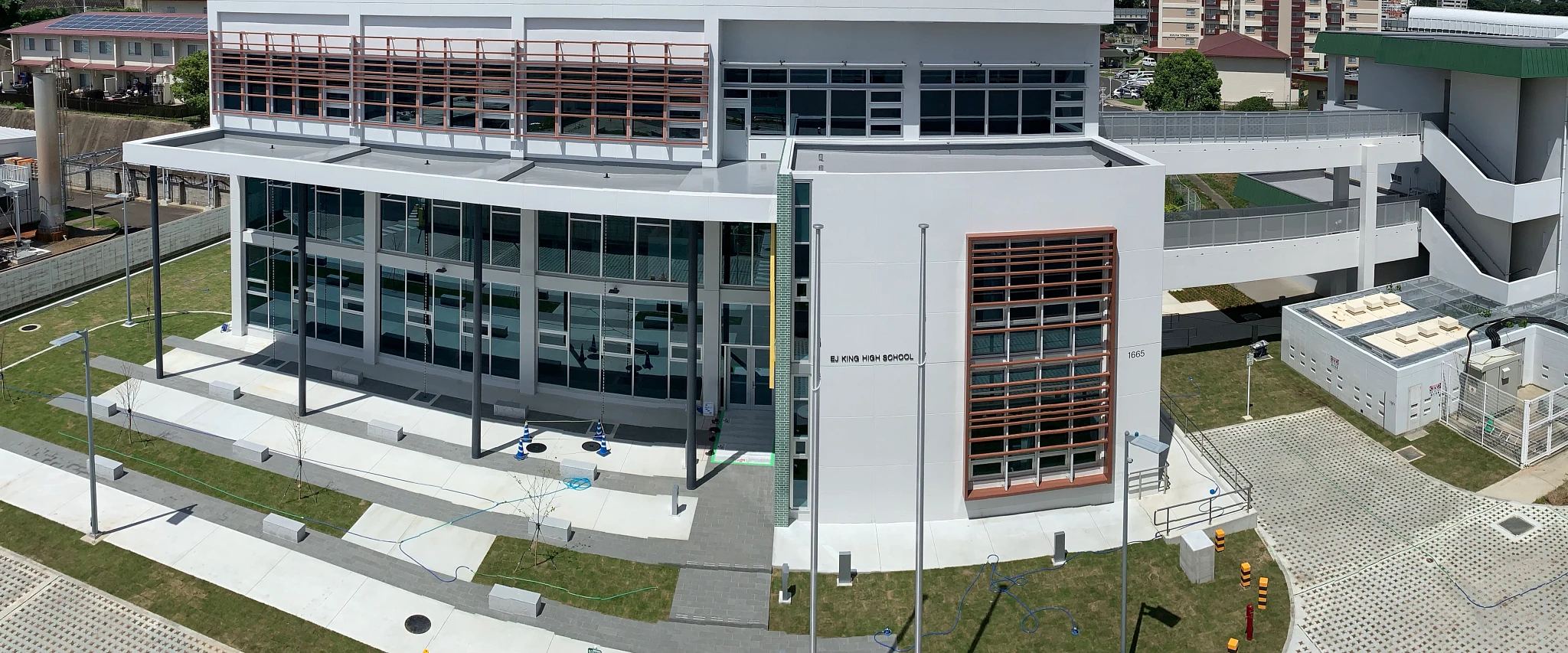
Ernest J. King Middle High School

Department of Defense Education Activity (DoDEA) schools include:

- Ernest J. King Middle High School
- Darby Elementary School
- Sasebo Elementary School
