= Bellingham Shipyards =

Coordinates: 48.7528°N 122.4899°W

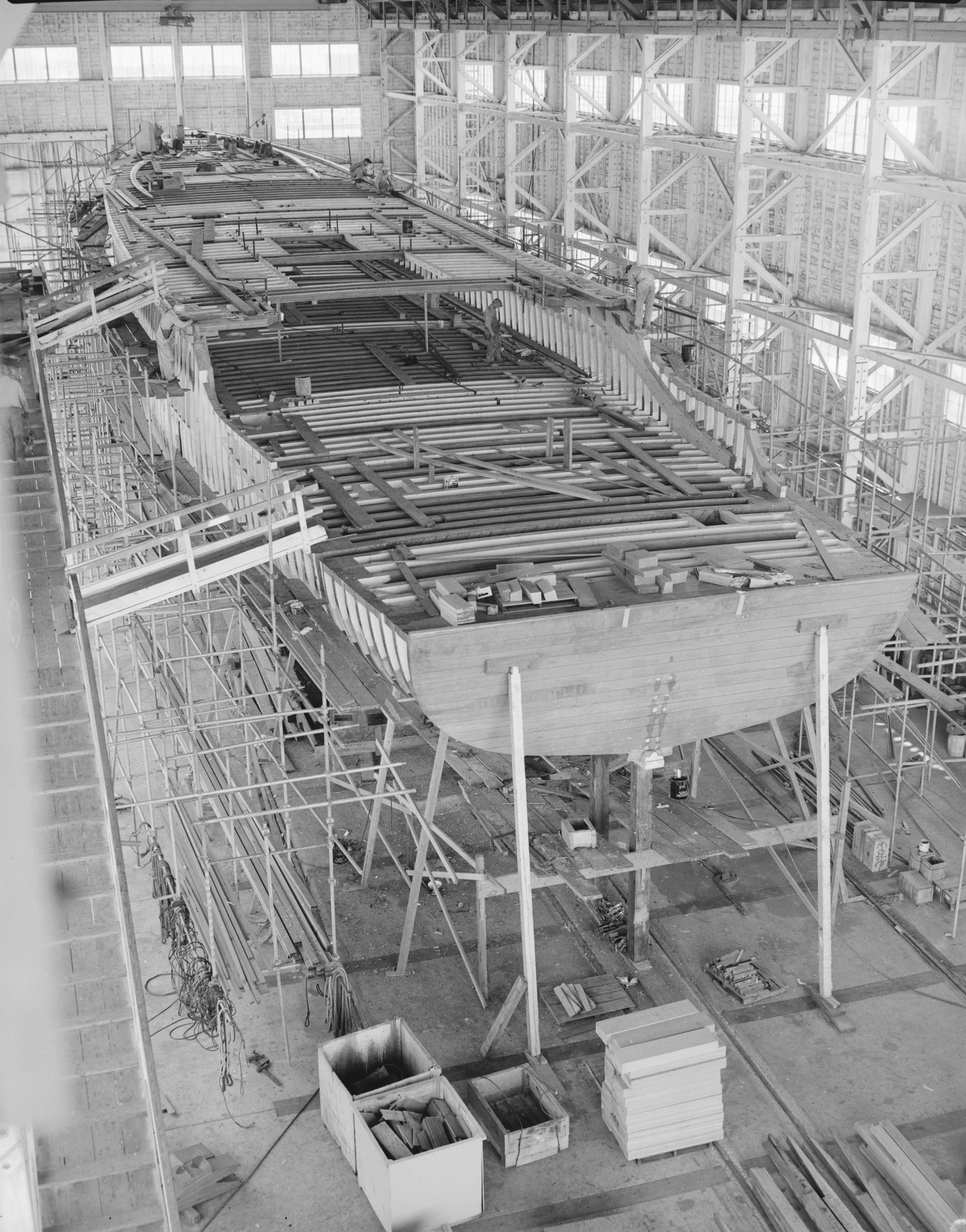
The French minesweeper Berlaimont M 620 under construction at, Bellingham, Shipyards (USA), 1954

The Bellingham Shipyards was founded in 1941 by Arch Talbot before the Second World War in Bellingham, Washington from the merger of the Bellingham Marine Railway and the Bellingham Iron Works. During the war the shipyard produced wooden minesweepers for the United States Navy. At the time they were the largest privately owned shipyard in the United States. The yard continued operations after the war under the name Bellingham Marine. They built Minesweepers for the U.S. and Belgium Navy, and were noted for their production of the Bell Boy Boats line. The company closed in 1963.

== See also ==
- Bell Boy Boats
