= List of Admirable-class minesweepers =

See Admirable-class minesweeper.

== List of Admirable class ships ==
- USS Admirable (AM-136)
- USS Adopt (AM-137)
- USS Advocate (AM-138)
- USS Agent (AM-139)
- USS Alarm (AM-140)
- USS Alchemy (AM-141)
- USS Apex (AM-142)
- USS Arcade (AM-143)
- USS Arch (AM-144)
- USS Armada (AM-145)
- USS Aspire (AM-146)
- USS Assail (AM-147)
- USS Astute (AM-148)
- USS Augury (AM-149)
- USS Barrier (AM-150)
- USS Bombard (AM-151)
- USS Bond (AM-152)
- USS Buoyant (AM-153)
- USS Candid (AM-154)
- USS Capable (AM-155)
- USS Captivate (AM-156)
- USS Caravan (AM-157)
- USS Caution (AM-158)
- USS Change (AM-159)
- USS Clamour (AM-160)
- USS Climax (AM-161)
- USS Compel (AM-162)
- USS Concise (AM-163)
- USS Control (AM-164)
- USS Counsel (AM-165)
- USS Crag (AM-214)
- USS Cruise (AM-215)
- USS Deft (AM-216)
- USS Delegate (AM-217)
- USS Density (AM-218)
- USS Design (AM-219)
- USS Device (AM-220)
- USS Diploma (AM-221)
- USS Disdain (AM-222)
- USS Dour (AM-223)
- USS Eager (AM-224)
- USS Elusive (AM-225)
- USS Embattle (AM-226)
- USS Embroil (AM-227) (canceled)
- USS Enhance (AM-228) (canceled)
- USS Equity (AM-229) (canceled)
- USS Esteem (AM-230) (canceled)
- USS Event (AM-231) (canceled)
- USS Execute (AM-232)
- USS Facility (AM-233)
- USS Fancy (AM-234)
- USS Fixity (AM-235)
- USS Flame (AM-236) (canceled)
- USS Fortify (AM-237) (canceled)
- USS Garland (AM-238)
- USS Gayety (AM-239)
- USS Hazard (AM-240)
- USS Hilarity (AM-241)
- USS Inaugural (AM-242)
- USS Illusive (AM-243) (canceled)
- USS Imbue (AM-244) (canceled)
- USS Impervious (AM-245) (canceled)
- USS Implicit (AM-246)
- USS Improve (AM-247)
- USS Incessant (AM-248)
- USS Incredible (AM-249)
- USS Indicative (AM-250)
- USS Inflict (AM-251)
- USS Instill (AM-252)
- USS Intrigue (AM-253)
- USS Invade (AM-254)
- USS Jubilant (AM-255)
- USS Knave (AM-256)
- USS Lance (AM-257)
- USS Logic (AM-258)
- USS Lucid (AM-259)
- USS Magnet (AM-260)
- USS Mainstay (AM-261)
- USS Marvel (AM-262)
- USS Measure (AM-263)
- USS Method (AM-264)
- USS Mirth (AM-265)
- USS Nimble (AM-266)
- USS Notable (AM-267)
- USS Nucleus (AM-268)
- USS Opponent (AM-269)
- USS Palisade (AM-270)
- USS Penetrate (AM-271)
- USS Peril (AM-272)
- USS Phantom (AM-273)
- USS Pinnacle (AM-274)
- USS Pirate (AM-275)
- USS Pivot (AM-276)
- USS Pledge (AM-277)
- USS Project (AM–278)
- USS Prime (AM-279)
- USS Prowess (AM-280)
- USS Quest (AM-281)
- USS Rampart (AM-282)
- USS Ransom (AM-283)
- USS Rebel (AM-284)
- USS Recruit (AM-285)
- USS Reform (AM-286)
- USS Refresh (AM-287)
- USS Reign (AM-288)
- USS Report (AM-289)
- USS Reproof (AM-290) (canceled)
- USS Risk (AM-291) (canceled)
- USS Rival (AM-292) (canceled)
- USS Sagacity (AM-293) (canceled)
- USS Salute (AM-294)
- USS Saunter (AM-295)
- USS Scout (AM-296)
- USS Scrimmage (AM-297)
- USS Scuffle (AM-298)
- USS Sentry (AM-299)
- USS Serene (AM-300)
- USS Shelter (AM-301)
- USS Signet (AM-302)
- USS Skirmish (AM-303)
- USS Scurry (AM-304)
- USS Spectacle (AM-305)
- USS Specter (AM-306)
- USS Staunch (AM-307)
- USS Strategy (AM-308)
- USS Strength (AM-309)
- USS Success (AM-310)
- USS Superior (AM-311)
- USS Creddock (AM-356)
- USS Dipper (AM-357)
- USS Drake (AM-359)
- USS Dunlin (AM-361)
- USS Gadwall (AM-362)
- USS Gavia (AM-363)
- USS Graylag (AM-364)
- USS Harlequin (AM-365)
- USS Harrier (AM-366)
- USS Hummer (AM-367) (canceled)
- USS Jackdaw (AM-368) (canceled)
- USS Minah (AM-370) (canceled)
- USS Albatross (AM-391) (canceled)
- USS Bullfinch (AM-392) (canceled)
- USS Cardinal (AM-393) (canceled)
- USS Firecrest (AM-394) (canceled)
- USS Goldfinch (AM-395) (canceled)
- USS Grackle (AM-396) (canceled)
- USS Grosbeak (AM-397) (canceled)
- USS Grouse (AM-398) (canceled)
- USS Gull (AM-399) (canceled)
- USS Hawk (AM-400) (canceled)
- USS Hummer (AM-401) (canceled)
- USS Jackdaw (AM-402) (canceled)
- USS Kite (AM-403) (canceled)
- USS Longspur (AM-404) (canceled)
- USS Merganser (AM-405) (canceled)
- USS Osprey (AM-406) (canceled)
- USS Partridge (AM–407) (canceled)
- USS Plover (AM-408) (canceled)
- USS Redhead (AM-409) (canceled)
- USS Sanderling (AM-410) (canceled)
- USS Scaup (AM-411) (canceled)
- USS Sentinel (AM-412)) (canceled)
- USS Shearwater (AM-413) (canceled)
- USS Waxbill (AM-414) (canceled)
- USS Bluebird (AM-415) (canceled)
- USS Flicker (AM-416) (canceled)
- USS Linnet (AM-417) (canceled)
- USS Magpie (AM-418) (canceled)
- USS Parrakeet (AM–419) (canceled)
- USS Pipit (AM–420) (canceled)
