= Peril (disambiguation) =

Peril is a concept in American law.

Peril may also refer to:

- Peril (band), an Australian electronic music group
- Peril (book), a 2021 non-fiction book by Bob Woodward and Robert Costa
- Peril (film), a 2000 film by David Giancola
- USS Peril (AM-272), an Admirable-class minesweeper

== See also ==
- Risk
- Peril Strait
