= USS Spectacle =

Minesweeper of the United States Navy

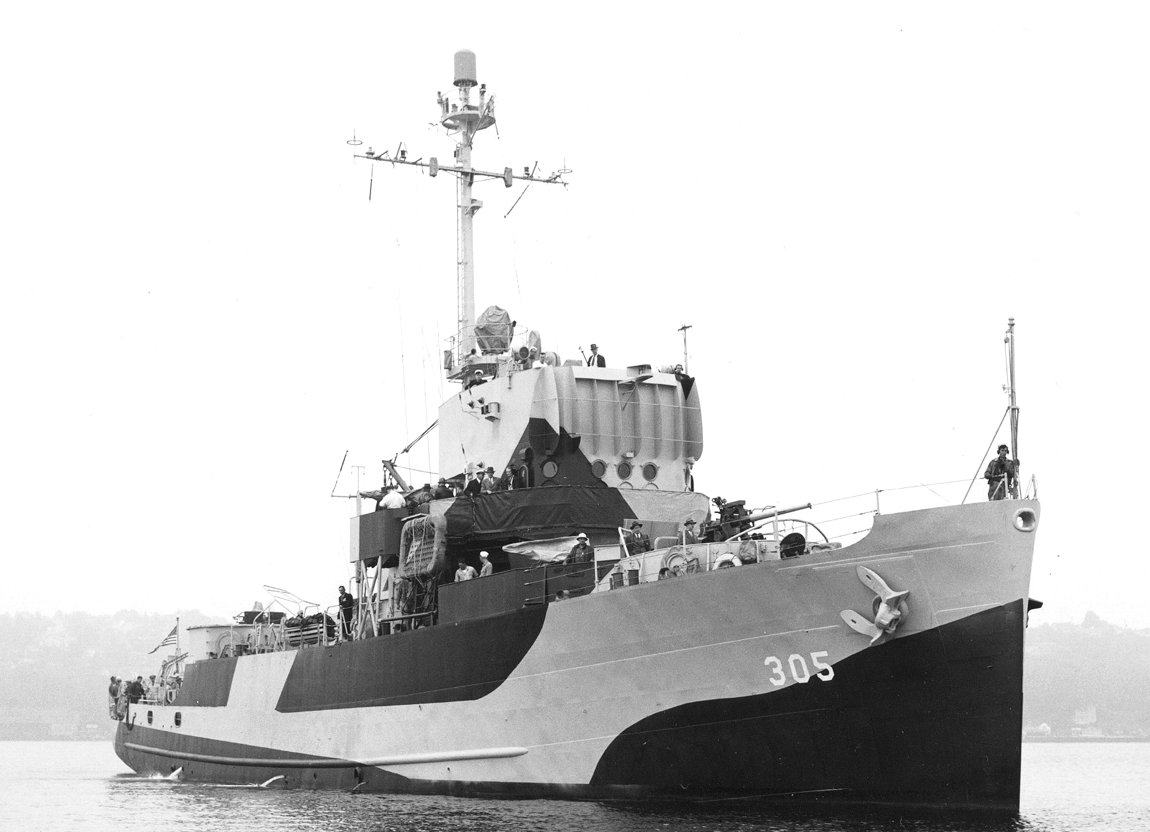
- Spectacle off Seattle on 8 August 1944

History

United States
- Name: USS Spectacle
- Builder: Associated Shipbuilders
- Laid down: 24 May 1943
- Launched: 1 October 1943
- Commissioned: 11 June 1944
- Decommissioned: 19 October 1945
- Stricken: December 1945
- Fate: Sold for scrap in April 1947

General characteristics
- Class & type: Admirable-class minesweeper
- Displacement: 650 tons; 945 tons (full load)
- Length: 184 ft 6 in (56.24 m)
- Beam: 33 ft (10 m)
- Draft: 9 ft 9 in (2.97 m)
- Propulsion: 2 × 1,710 shp Cooper Bessemer GSB-8 diesel engines; National Supply Co. single reduction gear; 2 shafts
- Speed: 14.8 knots (27.4 km/h)
- Complement: 104
- Armament: 1 × 3"/50 caliber gun DP; 1 × twin Bofors 40 mm guns; 6 × Oerlikon 20 mm cannon; 1 × Hedgehog anti-submarine mortar; 4 × Depth charge projectors (K-guns); 2 × Depth charge racks

Service record
- Part of: US Pacific Fleet (1944-1945)
- Operations: Battle of Iwo Jima; Battle of Okinawa
- Awards: 2 Battle stars

USS Spectacle (AM-305) was a steel-hulled Admirable class minesweeper built for the U.S. Navy during World War II. A trained crew boarded the new vessel, practiced with her minesweeping gear, and then proceeded to the Pacific Ocean to clear mines from Japanese beaches so that Allied forces could invade. While performing this dangerous task of mine clearance, a Japanese plane strafed her, and another deliberately crashed into her. When she returned to the United States, her battle damage was so severe that the U.S. Navy decided to scrap, rather than to repair, her. She was awarded two battle stars.

Spectacle was laid down on 24 May 1943 by Associated Shipbuilders, Seattle, Washington; launched on 10 October 1943; and, commissioned on 11 August 1944.

== World War II Pacific Theatre operations ==
After fitting out at Puget Sound and conducting trial runs at Seattle, Washington, Spectacle sailed on the 31st for San Pedro, California. Following her shakedown training, held from 5 to 24 September, she moved to the West Coast Sonar School, San Diego, California, for equipment testing and antisubmarine warfare training that lasted until 27 October. The ship got underway for Hawaii the next day and arrived at Pearl Harbor on 5 November.

The following week, Spectacle sailed in the screen of a convoy and arrived at San Francisco, California, on 20 November. On the 27th, she and USS Design (AM-219) departed Seattle, Washington, and headed back toward Pearl Harbor. From 9 December 1944 to 21 January 1945, the minesweeper conducted extensive minesweeping and training exercises with fleet units in Hawaiian waters.

== Invasion of Iwo Jima operations ==
On 22 January, Spectacle sortied with Task Group (TG) 51.13, Tractor Group Baker, part of the Iwo Jima assault force as part of the Battle of Iwo Jima. After staging at Eniwetok, Marshall Islands, and Saipan, Mariana Islands, the group arrived off Iwo Jima. Spectacle began sweeping mines on 16 February and remained in waters near Iwo Jima until 7 March. She swept mines; acted as an escort and patrol ship; and, on several occasions, bombarded enemy targets ashore. On 7 March, Spectacle, accompanied by USS Scurry (AM-304), withdrew to Ulithi for replenishment and repair.

== Invasion of Okinawa operations ==
Spectacle sailed from Ulithi on 19 March with TG 52.4, composed of Minesweeper Group One, for Okinawa to sweep mines from waters near that island for the forthcoming amphibious assault which was scheduled to begin on 1 April as part of the Battle of Okinawa. She started minesweeping and patrol duties at Okinawa on 25 March. On 28 April, her whaleboat rescued 14 survivors from USS Pinkney (APH-2) which had been hit by a kamikaze.

== Under constant attack and hit by a kamikaze ==
On 4 May, the minesweeper sank two small Japanese boats and set one afire with gunfire. That evening, she was strafed by an enemy plane. She sank another small boat on 13 May; and, the next evening, she sank five small suicide boats. Spectacle took patrol station near Ie Shima on 22 May and, early that morning, splashed a "Betty". At 0805, a diving kamikaze crashed into the minesweeper, striking the ship under her port 40-millimeter gun tub, causing extensive damage and blowing many of her crew overboard. Her rudder jammed. She dropped anchor to avoid running over her men in the water. At 0815, USS LSM-135 began picking up survivors; but, 15 minutes later, the medium landing ship was also hit by a kamikaze and burst into flames. Spectacle's losses were: 11 killed outright, four who died of wounds, six wounded, and 14 missing in action.

== Returning stateside in a damaged condition ==
The ship was towed to Ie Shima by USS Tekesta (ATF-93). Under power from her starboard engine, she proceeded on the 26th, to Kerama Retto, where she was temporarily repaired by auxiliary repair dock USS ARD-1 (no name). She sailed for Saipan on 14 June, departed that island on the 26th, and headed via Pearl Harbor for the west coast.

== Recommended for scrapping ==
Spectacle arrived at Seattle, Washington, on 1 August and, the next day, moved to the Puget Sound Bridge and Dredging Company's dock for battle damage repairs; but no work was begun. On 5 September, the Pacific Board of Inspection and Survey recommended that she be scrapped and sold. Between 6 September and 18 October, all of her material and equipment was removed and, on the 19th, the ship was decommissioned.

Spectacle was struck from the Navy list on 5 December 1945 and sold to Northwest Merchandising Service in April 1947 for scrap.

== Awards ==
Spectacle received two battle stars for World War II service.
