= USS Opponent =

Minesweeper of the United States Navy

History

United States
- Name: USS Opponent
- Builder: Gulf Shipbuilding Company
- Laid down: 21 September 1942
- Launched: 26 June 1943
- Commissioned: 18 February 1944
- Decommissioned: 27 August 1946
- Reclassified: MSF-269, 7 February 1955
- Stricken: 1 April 1960
- Fate: Sold, 3 February 1961

General characteristics
- Class & type: Admirable-class minesweeper
- Displacement: 650 tons
- Length: 184 ft 6 in (56.24 m)
- Beam: 33 ft (10 m)
- Draft: 9 ft 9 in (2.97 m)
- Propulsion: 2 × ALCO 539 diesel engines, 1,710 shp (1.3 MW); Farrel-Birmingham single reduction gear; 2 shafts
- Speed: 14.8 knots (27.4 km/h)
- Complement: 104
- Armament: 1 × 3"/50 caliber gun; 2 × twin Bofors 40 mm gun; 1 × Hedgehog anti-submarine mortar; 2 × Depth charge tracks

Service record
- Part of: US Atlantic Fleet (1944-1945); US Pacific Fleet (1945-1946); Atlantic Reserve Fleet (1946-1960)

USS Opponent (AM-269) was an Admirable-class minesweeper built for the U.S. Navy during World War II. She was built to clear minefields in offshore waters, and served the Navy in the Atlantic Ocean and then was transferred to the North Pacific Ocean before war’s end.

Opponent was laid down 21 September 1942 by the Gulf Shipbuilding Co., Chickasaw, Alabama, launched 12 June 1943; sponsored by Mrs. H. Key, Jr.; and, commissioned 18 February 1944.

== World War II Atlantic operations ==
After shakedown along the Atlantic coast and in the Gulf Opponent departed Norfolk, Virginia, 12 April for Casco Bay, Maine. There she conducted antisubmarine exercises until she sailed for New York escorting USS Pontiac (AF-20), arriving Norfolk 29 April. Early the next month, Opponent's commanding officer was ordered to assume command of Mine Squadron 33 as well as to retain command of his ship. For the next year, the little minesweeper alternated between patrol work, type training and weather ship duties.

== Transfer to the Pacific Fleet ==
On 16 March 1945 she sailed for the Pacific. Arriving San Diego, California, on 5 April, Opponent was assigned to Mine Division 44. She departed San Diego three days later and arrived Pearl Harbor on the 13th. For the remainder of the war, Opponent escorted convoys between Southeast Asia and Pearl Harbor. She continued this service until early 1946, when she sailed to Orange, Texas.

== Post-war decommissioning ==
Opponent was decommissioned on 27 August 1946. She was reclassified MSF-269 on 7 February 1955. She was stricken from the Naval Vessel Register on 1 April 1960 and was sold to Ships & Power Inc., Miami, Florida, on 3 February 1961.
