= USS Prowess =

Minesweeper of the United States Navy

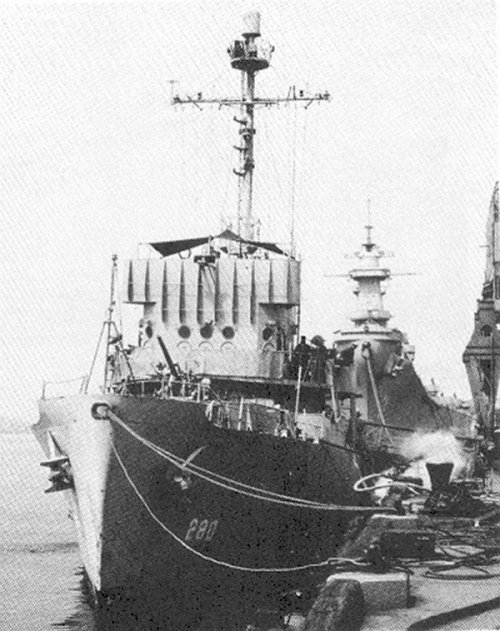

History

United States
- Name: USS Prowess (AM-280)
- Builder: Gulf Shipbuilding Company, Chickasaw, Alabama
- Laid down: 15 September 1943
- Launched: 17 February 1944
- Sponsored by: Mrs. Thomas W. Rubottom
- Commissioned: 27 September 1944
- Decommissioned: December 1945
- Reclassified: MSF-280, 7 February 1955
- In service: 1965
- Out of service: June 1970
- Reclassified: IX-305, 1 March 1966
- Fate: transferred to South Vietnam, 4 June 1970
- Stricken: 1970

History

South Vietnam
- Name: RVNS Ha Hoi (HQ 13)
- Acquired: 4 June 1970
- Fate: captured by North Vietnamese forces

History

Vietnam
- Name: unknown
- Acquired: c. 1975
- Fate: hulked and converted to training vessel, 1998; scrapped

General characteristics
- Class & type: Admirable-class minesweeper
- Displacement: 650 tons
- Length: 184 ft 6 in (56.24 m)
- Beam: 33 ft (10 m)
- Draft: 9 ft 9 in (2.97 m)
- Propulsion: 2 × ALCO 539 diesel engines, 1,710 shp (1.3 MW); Farrel-Birmingham single reduction gear; 2 shafts
- Speed: 14.8 knots (27.4 km/h)
- Complement: 104
- Armament: 1 × 3"/50 caliber gun DP; 2 × twin Bofors 40 mm guns; 1 × Hedgehog anti-submarine mortar; 2 × Depth charge tracks

Service record
- Part of: US Atlantic Fleet (1944-1945); Atlantic Reserve Fleet (1945-1970)

USS Prowess (AM-280) was an Admirable-class minesweeper built for the United States Navy during World War II. At war's end she was placed in reserve. In the mid-1960s, she was converted into a training ship for U.S. Naval Reserve personnel. She was transferred to South Vietnam in June 1970 as RVNS Ha Hoi (HQ-13) in the Republic of Vietnam Navy. In 1975, Ha Hoi was seized by North Vietnamese forces and incorporated into the Vietnamese People's Navy. She remained in service until 1998, when she was converted into a training ship. She has since been scrapped.

== Career ==
Prowess was laid down 15 September 1943 by Gulf Shipbuilding Corp., Chickasaw, Alabama; launched 17 February 1944; sponsored by Mrs. Thomas W. Rubottom; and commissioned 27 September 1944. Following shakedown out of Little Creek, Virginia, Prowess escorted USS Pontiac (AF-20) from Boston, Massachusetts, to Bermuda, departing Boston 14 December 1944. Upon returning to Little Creek, she trained minesweeper personnel from 1 January 1945 to 31 August. Departing Little Creek 3 October, she participated in festivities honoring Admiral Nimitz at Washington, D.C., in early October. After a visit to Wilmington, Delaware, she returned to Norfolk, Virginia.

Prowess entered the Atlantic Reserve Fleet in December 1945. She was reclassified MSF-280 on 7 February 1955. Assigned a homeport of Buffalo, New York, from 1 September 1965 and reclassified as an Unclassified Miscellaneous Auxiliary IX-305 on 1 March 1966, she has served as a naval reserve training ship from February 1962 into 1970.

She was transferred to South Vietnam, 4 June 1970 as RVNS Ha Hoi (HQ-13) and struck from the Naval Register in 1970. She was captured by North Vietnamese forces in 1975. In 1998, after some 23 years of service in the Vietnamese People's Navy, she was hulked and converted to a training vessel. She has since been scrapped.
