= USS Phantom =

Minesweeper of the United States Navy

History

United States
- Name: USS Phantom (AM-273)
- Builder: Gulf Shipbuilding Company
- Laid down: 1 February 1943
- Launched: 25 July 1943
- Commissioned: 17 May 1944
- Decommissioned: 10 October 1946
- Stricken: October 1949
- Fate: Transferred to the Republic of China, 15 June 1948

Taiwan
- Name: ROCS Yung Ming
- Acquired: 30 June 1948
- Fate: Sold for scrap in July 1951

General characteristics
- Class & type: Admirable-class minesweeper
- Displacement: 650 tons
- Length: 184 ft 6 in (56.24 m)
- Beam: 33 ft (10 m)
- Draft: 9 ft 9 in (2.97 m)
- Propulsion: 2 × ALCO 539 diesel engines, 1,710 shp (1.3 MW); Farrel-Birmingham single reduction gear; 2 shafts
- Speed: 14.8 knots (27.4 km/h)
- Complement: 104
- Armament: 1 × 3"/50 caliber gun DP; 2 × twin Bofors 40 mm guns; 1 × Hedgehog anti-submarine mortar; 2 × Depth charge tracks

Service record
- Part of: US Atlantic Fleet (1944-1945); US Pacific Fleet (1945-1946)
- Awards: 3 Battle stars

USS Phantom (AM-273) was an Admirable-class minesweeper built for the U.S. Navy during World War II. She was built to clear minefields in offshore waters, and served the Navy in the Atlantic Ocean and then was transferred to the North Pacific Ocean where she was transferred to the Chinese Navy as part of the lend lease program. Her American crew members returned home with the satisfaction that they had won three battle stars during the war.

Phantom was laid down by the Gulf Shipbuilding Co., Chickasaw, Alabama, 1 February 1943, launched 25 July 1943 and commissioned 17 May 1944.

== World War II Atlantic operations ==
After shakedown she reported to ComServLant for duty 8 July 1944, and operated out of Norfolk, Virginia, on minesweeping and escort duties along the U.S. East Coast and off Bermuda for the balance of the year. In January 1945 she arrived off McNabs Island Nova Scotia, escorting USS Pontiac (AF-20) then stood by as Pontiac was beached in a sinking condition.

== Transfer to the Pacific Fleet ==
After further operations along the east coast from Boston, Massachusetts, to Jacksonville, Florida, she transited the Panama Canal 9 April 1945, and reached Pearl Harbor 4 May. Continuing on, she arrived at Okinawa 26 June and for the rest of the war swept mines off that hard-fought for island.

In September she moved to Japan for minesweeping operations and in December shifted to the waters off the China coast. In January 1946 she got underway for the United States, arrived at San Diego, California, 18 February and in July headed west again. On 14 September she arrived at Subic Bay and reported for inactivation.

== Transferred to the Chinese Navy ==
Decommissioning 10 October 1946, she was kept in reserve until transferred to the Nationalist Chinese Navy 15 June 1948. Struck from the U.S. Navy List 13 July 1948, she served as Yung Ming until October 1949 when she was decommissioned and struck from the Nationalist Chinese Navy List. In July 1951 her hulk was sold for scrap.

== Awards ==
Phantom earned 3 battle stars for World War II service.
