= USS Nucleus =

Minesweeper of the United States Navy

History

United States
- Name: USS Nucleus (AM-268)
- Builder: Gulf Shipbuilding Corporation, Chickasaw, Alabama
- Laid down: 7 September 1942
- Launched: 12 June 1943
- Sponsored by: Mrs. V. Ludwig
- Commissioned: 12 December 1943
- Decommissioned: 21 May 1945
- Fate: Transferred to Soviet Navy, 21 May 1945
- Reclassified: MSF-268, 7 February 1955
- Stricken: 1 January 1983

History

Soviet Union
- Name: T-278
- Acquired: 21 May 1945
- Commissioned: 21 May 1945
- Refit: Converted to naval trawler, 1948
- Renamed: Uragan, 1948
- Honors and awards: Guards rank and ensign, 26 August 1945
- Fate: Scrapped 1960

General characteristics
- Class & type: Admirable-class minesweeper
- Displacement: 650 tons
- Length: 184 ft 6 in (56.24 m)
- Beam: 33 ft (10 m)
- Draft: 9 ft 9 in (2.97 m)
- Propulsion: 2 × ALCO 539 diesel engines, 1,710 shp (1.3 MW); Farrel-Birmingham single reduction gear; 2 shafts
- Speed: 14.8 knots (27.4 km/h)
- Complement: 104
- Armament: 1 × 3-inch/50-caliber gun DP; 2 × twin Bofors 40 mm guns; 1 × Hedgehog anti-submarine mortar; 2 × depth charge tracks

Service record
- Part of: United States Atlantic Fleet (1943–1945); Soviet Pacific Ocean Fleet (1945–1960)

USS Nucleus (AM-268) was an Admirable-class minesweeper built for the United States Navy during World War II and in commission from 1943 to 1945. In 1945, she was transferred to the Soviet Union and after that served in the Soviet Navy as T-278. The Soviets converted her into a naval trawler in 1948 and renamed her Uragan.

== Construction and commissioning ==
Nucleus was laid down at Chickasaw, Alabama, by the Gulf Shipbuilding Corporation on 7 September 1942, launched on 26 June 1943, sponsored by Mrs. V. Ludwig, and commissioned on 11 February 1944.

== Service history ==
=== U.S. Navy, World War II, 1943–1945 ===
Following shakedown in the Chesapeake Bay, Nucleus served briefly as an escort vessel to the Caribbean, then on 20 April 1944 proceeded to Boston. From Boston, she escorted a convoy to Naval Station Argentia in the Dominion of Newfoundland, arriving there on 6 May 1944. After another escort run between Boston and Argentia, she took up meteorological information collection duties in the North Atlantic Ocean. Between 10 and 24 June 1944 a platform deck for launching radiosonde gear and weather balloons was added to her silhouette to make her more effective as a weather ship. Relieved of weather duties by her sister ship USS Penetrate on 7 October 1944, Nucleus returned to Boston, then steamed to Norfolk, Virginia, arriving there on 25 November 1944.

During December 1944 Nucleus swept mines and conducted antisubmarine warfare patrols off the entrance to the Chesapeake Bay. In January 1945 she conducted another Caribbean escort run, and on 2 February 1945 she departed Norfolk, escorting the gasoline (petrol) tanker USS Tetonkaha to Navassa Island. Detached on 8 February 1945, she continued on to the Panama Canal Zone and transited the Panama Canal for duty in the Pacific.

Selected for transfer to the Soviet Navy in Project Hula – a secret program for the transfer of U.S. Navy ships to the Soviet Navy at Cold Bay, Territory of Alaska, in anticipation of the Soviet Union joining the war against Japan – Nucleus arrived at Cold Bay on 3 April 1945 to begin familiarization training of her new Soviet crew.

=== Soviet Navy, 1945–1960 ===
Following the completion of training for her Soviet crew, Method was decommissioned on 21 May 1945 at Cold Bay and transferred to the Soviet Union under Lend-Lease immediately. Also commissioned into the Soviet Navy immediately, she was designated as a tralshik ("minesweeper") and renamed T-278 in Soviet service. She soon departed Cold Bay bound for Petropavlovsk-Kamchatsky in the Soviet Union, where she entered service with the Soviet Pacific Ocean Fleet on 17 June 1945. After the Soviet Union entered the war against Japan on 8 August 1945, T-278 took part in the Soviet amphibious landings at Chongjin, Korea, on 18 August 1945 and at Maoka in the Japanese province of Karafuto on southern Sakhalin Island on 20 August 1945.

In February 1946, the United States began negotiations for the return of ships loaned to the Soviet Union for use during World War II, and on 8 May 1947, United States Secretary of the Navy James V. Forrestal informed the United States Department of State that the United States Department of the Navy wanted 480 of the 585 combatant ships it had transferred to the Soviet Union for World War II use returned. Deteriorating relations between the two countries as the Cold War broke out led to protracted negotiations over the ships, and by the mid-1950s the U.S. Navy found it too expensive to bring home ships that had become worthless to it anyway. Many ex-American ships were merely administratively "returned" to the United States and instead sold for scrap in the Soviet Union, while the U.S. Navy did not seriously pursue the return of others because it viewed them as no longer worth the cost of recovery. The Soviet Union never returned Nucleus to the United States, instead converting her into a naval trawler in 1948 and renaming her Uragan. Meanwhile, the U.S. Navy reclassified her as a "fleet minesweeper" (MSF) and redesignated her MSF-268 on 7 February 1955.

== Disposal ==
The ship was scrapped in 1960. Unaware of her fate, the U.S. Navy kept Nucleus on its Naval Vessel Register until finally striking her on 1 January 1983.

== Awards ==
The Soviet Union awarded T-278 the Guards rank and ensign on 26 August 1945 for her service during the August 1945 Soviet offensive against the Japanese.
