= USS Incessant =

Minesweeper of the United States Navy

History

United States
- Name: USS Incessant
- Builder: Savannah Machine and Foundry Company
- Laid down: 3 July 1943
- Launched: 22 October 1943
- Commissioned: 25 March 1944
- Decommissioned: 6 November 1946
- Fate: Transferred to the Maritime Commission, 30 November 1948.; Sold 30 November 1949

General characteristics
- Class & type: Admirable-class minesweeper
- Displacement: 650 tons
- Length: 184 ft 6 in (56.24 m)
- Beam: 33 ft (10 m)
- Draft: 9 ft 9 in (2.97 m)
- Propulsion: 2 × ALCO 539 diesel engines, 1,710 shp (1.3 MW); Farrel-Birmingham single reduction gear; 2 shafts
- Speed: 14.8 knots (27.4 km/h)
- Complement: 104
- Armament: 1 × 3"/50 caliber gun DP; 2 × twin Bofors 40 mm guns; 1 × Hedgehog anti-submarine mortar; 2 × Depth charge tracks

Service record
- Part of: US Atlantic Fleet (1944-1945); US Pacific Fleet (1945-1946)
- Awards: 2 Battle stars

USS Incessant (AM-248) was an Admirable-class minesweeper built for the U.S. Navy during World War II. She was built to clear minefields in offshore waters, and served the Navy in the North Atlantic Ocean and then in the Pacific Ocean. She returned home at war's end with two battle stars to her credit.

Incessant was laid down 3 July 1943 by Savannah Machine & Foundry Ga., Savannah, Georgia; launched 22 October 1943; sponsored by Mrs. Ralston Mingledorff; and commissioned 25 March 1944.

== World War II North Atlantic operations ==
After shakedown out of Casco Bay, Maine, Incessant departed Norfolk, Virginia, 24 May 1944 for escort and training duty in the Caribbean and the Gulf of Mexico. Returning to Norfolk 8 July she sailed in convoy 23 July and after stopping at Mers-el-Kebir arrived off the coast of Southern France.

As the Allies pushed northward from the beachheads, the powerful guns of the fleet protected the flanks and knocked out the German coastal batteries on the Italian Riviera while minesweepers cleared the channel off the French coast. Incessant and her sister ships performed dangerous sweeping in the harbors of southern France in spite of human torpedoes and enemy shore fire from the Italian side. Incessant helped clear the channel into Mentone 9–10 September and then continued her minesweeping mg and patrol duties at other Mediterranean points - Bizerte, the coast of Sardinia, and Palermo, Sicily. In January 1945 she was assigned new duties, and after transiting the historic Dardanelles, arrived Sevastopol 26 January. There Incessant met her Russian pilot and interpreter and began important air-sea rescue work in the Black Sea. She departed for Palermo 15 February and resumed Mediterranean operations until sailing from Mers-el-Kebir 17 April for the United States.

== Transfer to the Pacific Fleet ==
With the European war won, Incessant arrived Norfolk 5 May and after a period of training sailed 5 July for the western Pacific via the Panama Canal and San Diego, California, arriving Pearl Harbor 21 August, after the war's end, minesweepers were still needed, however, and Incessant proceeded to Eniwetok, Saipan, and Okinawa, in the weeks that followed. She arrived Sasebo for sweeping operations incident to the occupation 25 October and in November 1945 operated in the East China Sea.

== Decommissioning ==
In March 1946 she was at Shanghai earmarked for transfer to China, but was eventually returned to Seattle, Washington, and decommissioned 6 November 1946. Incessant was subsequently returned to the Maritime Commission and sold to R. A. Rutherford 30 November 1948. She was converted to river service in 1949 at Paducah Marine Ways, Paducah, Kentucky and renamed MV Commercial Ohioan. She was in service until 1955, but her current fate is unknown.

== Awards ==
Incessant received two battle stars for World War II service.
