= USS Change =

Minesweeper of the United States Navy

History

United States
- Name: USS Change
- Builder: Willamette Iron and Steel Works
- Laid down: 23 May 1942
- Launched: 15 December 1942
- Commissioned: 28 February 1944
- Decommissioned: 3 July 1946
- Reclassified: MSF-159, 7 February 1955
- Fate: Scrapped in 1960

General characteristics
- Class & type: Admirable-class minesweeper
- Displacement: 650 tons
- Length: 184 ft 6 in (56.24 m)
- Beam: 33 ft (10 m)
- Draft: 9 ft 9 in (2.97 m)
- Propulsion: 2 × ALCO 539 diesel engines, 1,710 shp (1.3 MW); Farrel-Birmingham single reduction gear; 2 shafts
- Speed: 14.8 knots (27.4 km/h)
- Complement: 104
- Armament: 1 × 3"/50 caliber gun DP; 2 × twin Bofors 40 mm guns; 1 × Hedgehog anti-submarine mortar; 2 × Depth charge tracks

Service record
- Part of: US Pacific Fleet (1944-1946)

USS Change (AM-159) was an Admirable-class minesweeper built for the U.S. Navy during World War II. She was built to clear minefields in offshore waters, and served the Navy in the Pacific Ocean.

She was launched 15 December 1942 by Willamette Iron and Steel Works, Portland, Oregon; commissioned 28 February 1944 and reported to the U.S. Pacific Fleet.

== World War II Pacific Ocean operations ==
Change arrived at Kwajalein 2 June 1944 for convoy escort duty between Pearl Harbor, Kwajalein, Majuro, and Eniwetok. Providing essential services in guarding the enormous volume of men and cargo moved in rear areas to provide support for the frontline campaigns, Change based at Eniwetok from 15 September. Her operations took her to Guadalcanal, Manus, Ulithi, Guam, Iwo Jima, and Saipan before 5 August 1945, when she cleared for Seattle, Washington.

== Post-War decommissioning ==
After overhaul, Change sailed to Pearl Harbor in November 1945, then cleared for the east coast. She was placed out of commission in reserve at New Orleans, Louisiana on 3 July 1946, and was reclassified MSF-159 on 7 February 1955. Date of removal from the Navy List is not shown in Navy records. She was scrapped in 1960.
