= USS Lucid (AM-259) =

Minesweeper of the United States Navy

History

United States
- Name: USS Lucid
- Builder: American Ship Building Company, Lorain, Ohio
- Laid down: 20 February 1943
- Launched: 5 June 1943
- Commissioned: 1 December 1943
- Decommissioned: 28 August 1945
- Fate: transfer to the Republic of China, 28 August 1945
- Stricken: 12 March 1948
- Fate: permanent transfer to the Republic of China, 12 March 1948

History

Taiwan
- Name: ROCS Yung Ting (AM-45)
- Acquired: 28 August 1945
- Renamed: ROCS Yang Ming (AGS-362), 1964
- Decommissioned: 1 July 1972
- Stricken: 1 July 1972
- Fate: unknown

General characteristics
- Class & type: Admirable-class minesweeper
- Displacement: 650 tons
- Length: 184 ft 6 in (56.24 m)
- Beam: 33 ft (10 m)
- Draft: 9 ft 9 in (2.97 m)
- Propulsion: 2 × ALCO 539 diesel engines, 1,710 shp (1.3 MW); Farrel-Birmingham single reduction gear; 2 shafts
- Speed: 14.8 knots (27.4 km/h)
- Complement: 104
- Armament: 1 × 3"/50 caliber gun DP; 2 × twin Bofors 40 mm guns; 1 × Hedgehog anti-submarine mortar; 2 × Depth charge tracks

Service record
- Part of: US Atlantic Fleet (1944-1945)

USS Lucid (AM-259) was an Admirable-class minesweeper built for the United States Navy during World War II. It was built to clear minefields in offshore waters, and served the Navy in the Atlantic Ocean.

Lucid was constructed by American Shipbuilding Co., Lorain, Ohio, on 20 February 1943; launched on 5 June 1943, sponsored by Mrs. Joseph S. Mood; and commissioned on 1 December 1943.

== World War II Atlantic operations ==
After shakedown out of Little Creek, Virginia, Lucid departed on 3 March 1944 for the Caribbean, arriving at Guantánamo Bay on 7 March. For the next twelve months, the minesweeper was assigned to escort duty between Trinidad, British West Indies, and Recife, Brazil. Protecting convoys from U-boat attacks, she made eight such voyages prior to reporting for duty as a training ship at Miami on 28 March 1945.

From April to June, Lucid operated as a school ship out of Miami and trained future naval officers in the art of seamanship.

== Decommissioning ==
Following a brief overhaul at Norfolk, Virginia, the minesweeper returned to Miami, Florida, and decommissioned there on 28 August 1945.

She was transferred to the Republic of China as ROCS Yung Ting (AM-45). Her transfer to the Republic of China was made permanent on 12 March 1948, and Lucid was struck from the U.S. Naval Vessel Register the same day. In 1964, she was reclassified as a survey ship and renamed ROCS Yang Ming (AGS 362). She was decommissioned and struck from the Republic of China Navy on 1 July 1972. Her ultimate fate is unknown.
