= USS Elusive (AM-225) =

Minesweeper of the United States Navy

History

United States
- Name: USS Elusive (AM-225)
- Builder: American Ship Building Company, Lorain, Ohio
- Laid down: 29 December 1943
- Launched: 10 June 1944
- Sponsored by: Miss E. Sweat
- Commissioned: 19 February 1945
- Decommissioned: 29 May 1946
- Fate: Transferred to the Republic of China, 29 May 1946

History

Taiwan
- Name: Yung Kang (AM 54).
- Acquired: 29 May 1946
- Stricken: 6 January 1962
- Fate: unknown

General characteristics
- Class & type: Admirable-class minesweeper
- Displacement: 650 long tons (660 t)
- Length: 184 ft 6 in (56.24 m)
- Beam: 33 ft (10 m)
- Draft: 9 ft 9 in (2.97 m)
- Propulsion: 2 × ALCO 539 diesel engines, 1,710 shp (1,280 kW); Farrel-Birmingham single reduction gear; 2 shafts
- Speed: 15 knots (28 km/h)
- Complement: 104
- Armament: 1 × 3"/50 caliber (76 mm) DP gun; 2 × twin Bofors 40 mm guns; 1 × Hedgehog anti-submarine mortar; 2 × Depth charge tracks

Service record
- Part of: U.S. Pacific Fleet (1945–1946); Chinese Maritime Customs Service (1946–1962)
- Awards: 1 Battle star

USS Elusive (AM-225) was an Admirable-class minesweeper built for the United States Navy during World War II. She earned two battle stars in service in the Pacific during World War II. In May 1946, she was turned over to the Republic of China for service with the Chinese Maritime Customs Service as Yung Kang. She was removed from service in January 1962.

== Career ==
Elusive was launched 10 June 1944 by American Shipbuilding Company, Lorain, Ohio; sponsored by Miss E. Sweat; and commissioned 19 February 1945.

Elusive sailed from Lorain 22 February 1945 by way of Chicago, Illinois, and the Mississippi River to outfit at Algiers, Louisiana. It suffered damage below the waterline while passing through Lake Erie and the Mississippi, and was drydocked for repair at the insistence of Lieutenant Commander E.N. Cleves. After training along the east coast, escort duty off Florida, and antisubmarine exercises off Cuba, she arrived at San Pedro, California, 21 July for final minesweeping training. She sailed 16 August for the Far East, and swept mines in Japanese waters, as well as voyaging to Guam and Subic Bay.

After removal of her guns and other demilitarization at the Subic Bay naval base, Elusive arrived at Shanghai 22 April 1946. There she was decommissioned 29 May 1946, and transferred to the Chinese Maritime Commission through the State Department the same day. She was renamed Yung Kang (AM 54). Yung Kang decommissioned and was struck, 6 January 1962. Fate unknown.

Elusive received one battle star for World War II service.
