= USS Scrimmage =

Admirable-class minesweeper built for the United States Navy

Coordinates: 21.438°N 158.206°W

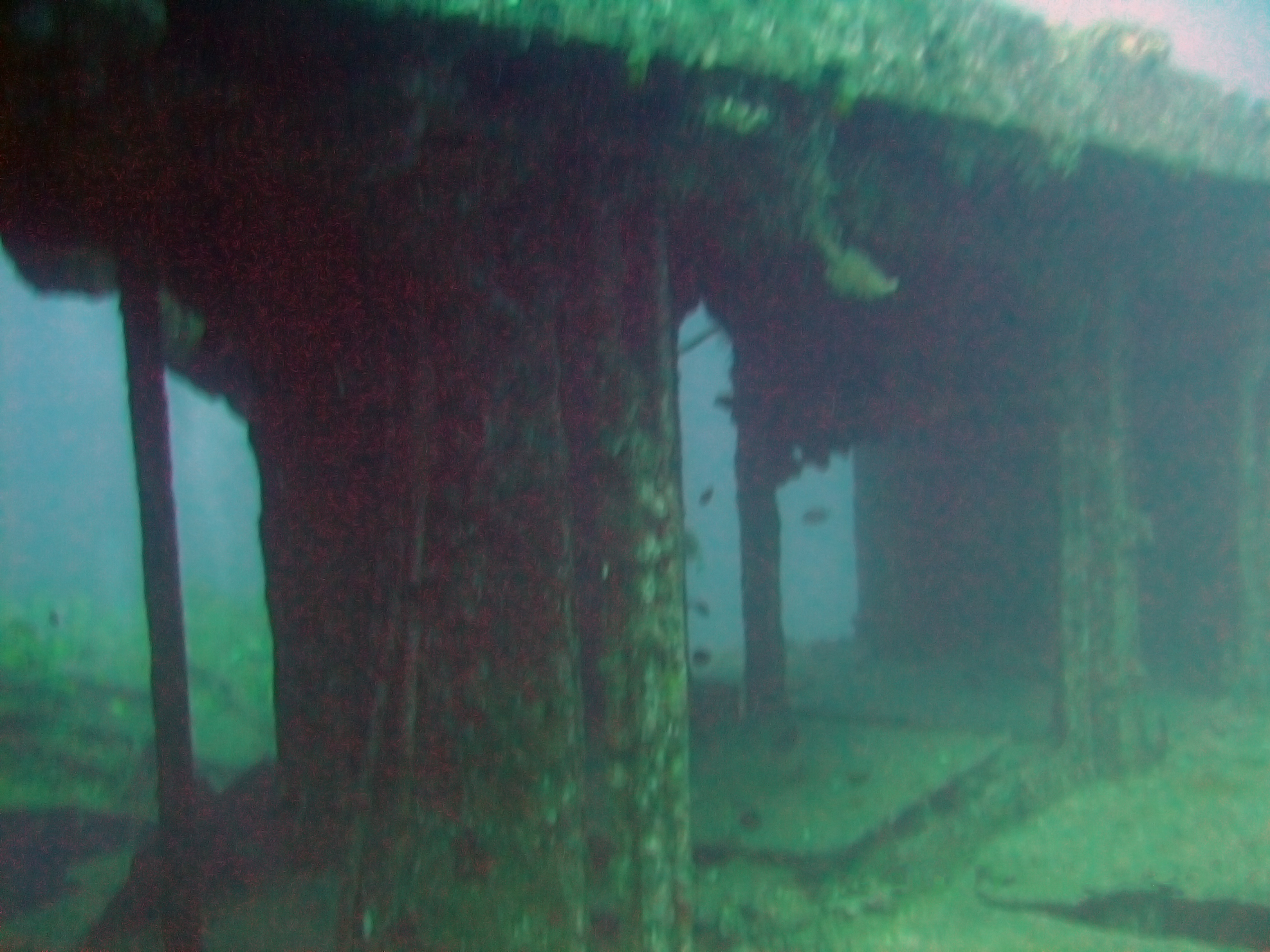
- Wreck of the Mahi in 2008

History

United States
- Name: USS Scrimmage
- Builder: Winslow Marine Railway and Shipbuilding Company
- Laid down: 22 February 1943
- Launched: 16 May 1943
- Commissioned: 4 April 1944
- Decommissioned: 22 June 1946
- Reclassified: MSF-297, 7 February 1955
- Stricken: 1 April 1960
- Fate: Sold into merchant service. Sunk as artificial reef 1982

General characteristics
- Class & type: Admirable-class minesweeper
- Displacement: 650 tons
- Length: 184 ft 6 in (56.24 m)
- Beam: 33 ft (10 m)
- Draft: 9 ft 9 in (2.97 m)
- Propulsion: 2 × ALCO 539 diesel engines, 1,710 shp (1.3 MW); Farrel-Birmingham single reduction gear; 2 shafts
- Speed: 14.8 knots (27.4 km/h)
- Complement: 104
- Armament: 1 × 3"/50 caliber gun DP; 2 × twin Bofors 40 mm guns; 6 × Oerlikon 20 mm cannons; 1 × Hedgehog anti-submarine mortar; 2 × Depth charge tracks

Service record
- Part of: US Pacific Fleet (1944-1946); Atlantic Reserve Fleet (1946-1960)
- Operations: Philippines campaign (1944–45)
- Awards: 6 Battle stars

USS Scrimmage (AM-297) was an Admirable-class minesweeper built for the United States Navy during World War II. She was built to clear minefields in offshore waters. She served in the Pacific Ocean and, because of her valiant efforts in combat, her crew returned home with six battle stars.

Scrimmage was laid down on 22 February 1943 by Winslow Marine Railway and Shipbuilding Company, Seattle, Washington, launched on 16 May 1943; and commissioned on 4 April 1944.

== World War II Pacific Theatre operations ==
After shakedown Scrimmage sailed from San Francisco, California, on 11 June 1944 for Pearl Harbor. After a convoy voyage to Enewetak Atoll and back, she helped sweep an old United States minefield in the French Frigate Shoals northwest of Oahu between 6 and 15 August. She reported to the 7th Fleet at Manus on 20 September for the Leyte invasion. On 20 October, she joined her division, Mine Division 34, off the Leyte beaches for a four-day sweep of the main transport channel and then anchored with the transports to provide anti-aircraft support.

== Searching for survivors ==
Between 27 and 31 October, she helped search for survivors at the scene of the Battle off Samar, where a few American escort carriers and their screen had withstood the attack of a superior Japanese force. For the next month, she carried out local patrols and sweeps around Leyte, and made a convoy voyage to Manus and back.

== Supporting the Philippine Islands operations ==
Scrimmage participated, with her divisions in most of the subsequent landings in the Philippines. She carried out pre-invasion sweeps at Ormoc Bay on 6 December 1944, Mindoro Island on 14 December, Lingayen Gulf on 6 January 1945, and Zambales and Subic Bay on 29 and 31 January. For all but the Ormoc assault, she remained on the scene after the initial landings, helping extend the mineswept areas and providing antisubmarine and antiaircraft protection to the transports. Few mines were encountered, but kamikaze resistance was intense, and the ships saw much antiaircraft action.

== Under fire from Japanese shore batteries ==
On 13 February, Scrimmage and her division began pre-invasion sweeps in Manila Bay in preparation for the landings at Mariveles and Corregidor. While sweeping off Corregidor on the 14th, the minesweepers came within 5,000 yards of the island and were repeatedly straddled by Japanese fire before supporting ships silenced the enemy's guns. Scrimmage continued sweeping in Manila Bay through 19 February, and her division earned a Navy Unit Commendation for the operation.

During the next two and one-half months, Scrimmage carried out various local sweeps in support of fighting in the Philippines, the most notable being a pre-assault sweep for the landings at Legaspi, Luzon on 1 April, and an 8-day sweep in the Sulu Sea off Palawan beginning on 22 April. On 9 May, the ship arrived at Morotai to prepare for operations in the Dutch East Indies.

== Supporting Borneo landings ==
Between 7 and 18 June, Scrimmage supported the landings at Brunei Bay, Borneo. During the operation, the minesweepers came under fire from shore batteries and one ship, USS Salute (AM-294), was sunk by a mine on 8 June. On completion of the operation, Scrimmage returned to Subic Bay for emergency engine repairs, arriving on 21 June.

== End-of-war activity ==
The minesweeper left the Philippines on 6 September and arrived at Nagoya, Japan, on 9 October, having weathered three typhoons en route. Between 16 October and 3 December, she swept Japanese minefields in the approaches to the Inland Sea and in Tsushima Strait. On 9 December she sailed from Sasebo for home.

== Post-war decommissioning ==
Arriving at Orange, Texas, on 2 April 1946, she was decommissioned there on 22 June 1946 and placed in reserve. The ship was reclassified MSF-297 on 7 February 1955.

She was struck from the Navy list on 1 April 1960 and sold. She became a British merchantman named MV Giant II and was used as a cable ship; sold in March 1968 to the Dillingham Corporation and leased to the University of Hawaii as a research vessel; renamed MS Mahi; sold in 1982 to Dacor Scuba Diving to be sunk as an artificial reef; and sunk in the Pacific Ocean approximately one mile off Waianae, Hawai'i, in 90 feet (27 meters) of water. A United States flag was raised on the mast of Mahi on 26 May 2008 by retired United States Army Sergeant First Class Shawn McElravy to commemorate Memorial Day; he replaced the flag with a new one on 25 May 2009.

== Awards ==
Scrimmage received 6 battle stars for her World War II service.
