= USS Compel =

Minesweeper of the United States Navy

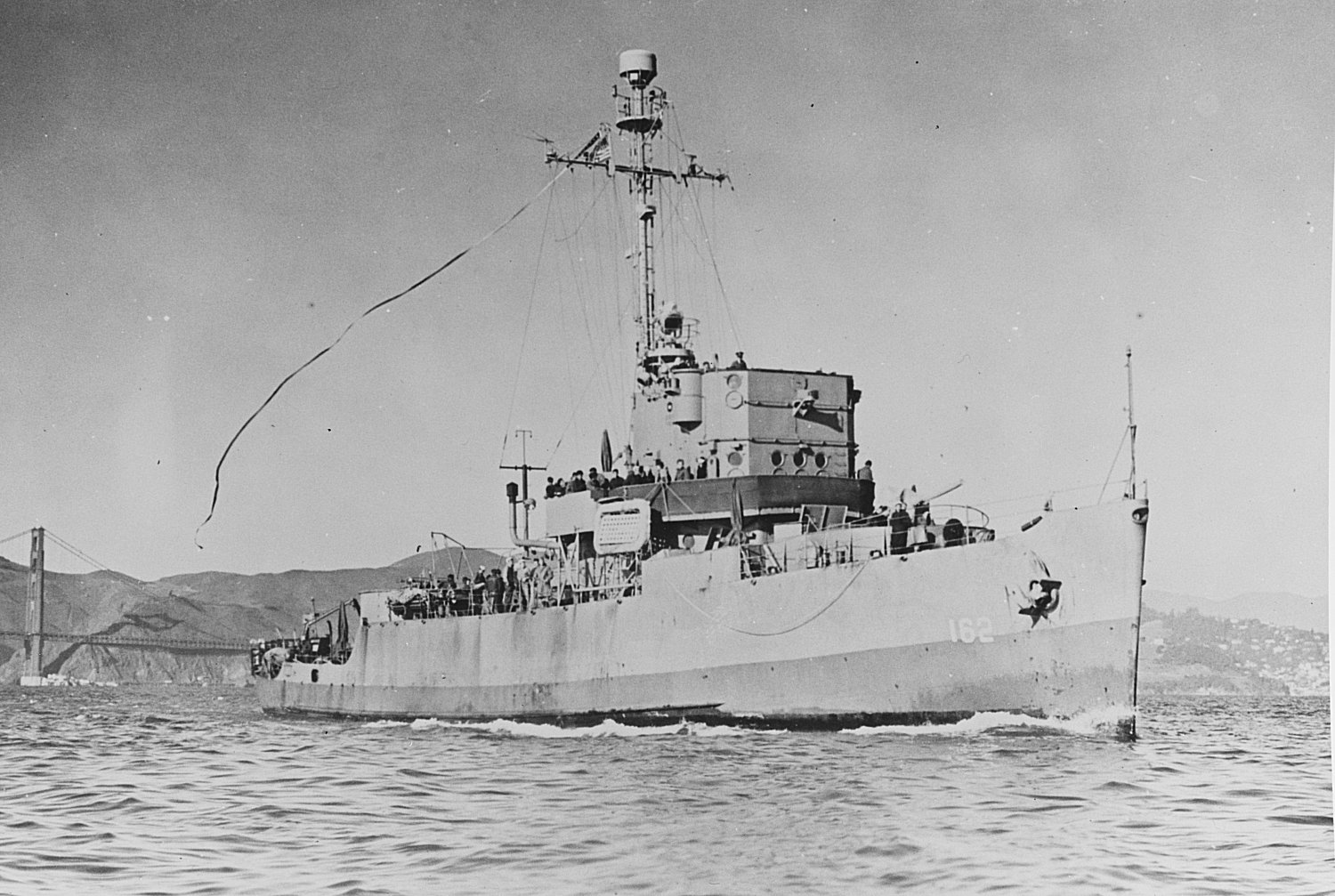
- Compel in San Francisco Bay, flying her Homeward Bound pennant.

History

United States
- Name: USS Compel
- Builder: Willamette Iron and Steel Works
- Laid down: 26 May 1942
- Launched: 16 January 1943
- Commissioned: 8 April 1944
- Decommissioned: 12 June 1946
- Reclassified: MSF-162, 7 February 1955
- Fate: Sold for scrap 26 August 1960

General characteristics
- Class & type: Admirable-class minesweeper
- Displacement: 650 tons
- Length: 184 ft 6 in (56.24 m)
- Beam: 33 ft (10 m)
- Draft: 9 ft 9 in (2.97 m)
- Propulsion: 2 × ALCO 539 diesel engines, 1,710 shp (1.3 MW); Farrel-Birmingham single reduction gear; 2 shafts
- Speed: 14.8 knots (27.4 km/h)
- Complement: 104
- Armament: 1 × 3"/50 caliber gun DP; 2 × twin Bofors 40 mm guns; 1 × Hedgehog anti-submarine mortar; 2 × Depth charge tracks

Service record
- Part of: US Pacific Fleet (1944–1946)
- Awards: 1 Battle star

USS Compel (AM-162) was an Admirable-class minesweeper built for the U.S. Navy during World War II. She was built to clear minefields in offshore waters, and served the Navy in the Pacific Ocean. Compel was awarded one battle star for World War II service.

She was launched January 1943 by Willamette Iron and Steel Works, Portland, Oregon; and commissioned 8 April 1944.

== World War II Pacific Ocean operations ==
Compel sailed from San Francisco, California, 22 June 1944 as escort for a tug group which arrived in Pearl Harbor 3 July. Continuing on to Majuro, Compel joined USS Coral Sea (CVE-57) off Kwajalein 25 July to escort the carrier to Pearl Harbor. Compel swept mines off French Frigate Shoals from 6 August to 15 August, then escorted a convoy to Eniwetok, arriving 5 September to assume antisubmarine patrol.

From 24 October 1944 until the end of the war Compel operated at Eniwetok, Ulithi, the Palaus, Saipan, Guam, and Majuro. She acted as convoy escort, minesweeper, harbor entrance control vessel, and experimental ship for minesweeping equipment. She sailed to Manus between 10 November and 12 November 1944 to deliver blood plasma to the men injured by the explosion of USS Mount Hood (AE-11). Taking departure from Saipan 29 August 1945 Compel sailed via Okinawa to clear the approaches to Wakayama, Japan, of mines. Moving to Nagoya for similar duty, she served there until 20 November when she sailed for San Francisco, California, arriving 16 December.

== Postwar decommissioning ==
She was placed out of commission in reserve at San Diego, California, 12 June 1946. Compel was reclassified MSF-162, 7 February 1955. She was sold on 26 August 1960.

== Awards ==
Compel was awarded one battle star for World War II service.
