= Soviet minesweeper T-112 =

Minesweeper of the Soviet Navy

History

United States NavyUnited States
- Name: USS Agent (AMc-116)
- Builder: Tampa Shipbuilding Company
- Reclassified: AM-139, 21 February 1942
- Laid down: 8 April 1942
- Launched: 1 November 1942
- Completed: 10 July 1943
- Fate: Transferred to the USSR, 10 July 1943
- Reclassified: As MSF-138, 7 February 1955
- Stricken: 1 January 1983

History

Soviet Union
- Name: T-112
- Acquired: 10 July 1943
- Renamed: TB-21, 15 October 1955
- Renamed: VTR-2Y, 8 March 1966
- Renamed: UTS-288, 20 April 1972
- Fate: Abandoned, 31 January 1991; hulk extant, as of 10 June 2007

General characteristics
- Class & type: Admirable-class minesweeper
- Displacement: 650 tons; 840 tons (full load)
- Length: 184 ft 6 in (56.24 m)
- Beam: 33 ft (10 m)
- Draft: 9 ft 9 in (2.97 m)
- Propulsion: 2 × ALCO 539 diesel engines, 1,710 shp (1.3 MW); Farrel-Birmingham single reduction gear; 2 shafts
- Speed: 14.8 knots (27.4 km/h)
- Complement: 85
- Armament: 2 × 3-inch/50-caliber gun DP; 8 × Oerlikon 20 mm cannon; 2 × 7.63mm Browning machine guns; 1 × Hedgehog anti-submarine mortar; 2 × Depth charge racks

T-112 was a minesweeper of the Soviet Navy during World War II and the Cold War. She had originally been built as USS Agent (AM-139), an Admirable-class minesweeper, for the United States Navy during World War II, but never saw active service in the U.S. Navy. Upon completion she was transferred to the Soviet Union under Lend-Lease as T-112; she was never returned to the United States. The ship was renamed several times in Soviet service and was finally abandoned in January 1991. Her hulk was extant as of 10 June 2007. Because of the Cold War, the U.S. Navy was unaware of the ship's status and the vessel remained on the American Naval Vessel Register until she was struck on 1 January 1983.

== Career ==
Agent was laid down on 8 April 1942 by the Tampa Shipbuilding Co., Tampa, Florida; launched on 1 November 1942; and completed 10 July 1943. She was transferred to the Soviet Navy that same day as T-112. She was never returned to U.S. custody.

In Soviet service, the ship was renamed TB-21 on 15 October 1955; VTR-2Y on 8 March 1956; and UTS-288 on 20 April 1972. The ship was abandoned on 31 January 1991, and, as of 10 June 2007 her hulk was extant.

Due to the ongoing Cold War, the U.S. Navy was unaware of the fate of the former Agent. They had reclassified the vessel as MSF-139 on 7 February 1955, and kept her on the American Naval Vessel Register until she was struck on 1 January 1983.
