= USS Deft =

Minesweeper of the United States Navy

History

United States
- Name: USS Deft
- Builder: Tampa Shipbuilding Company
- Laid down: 27 December 1942
- Launched: 28 March 1943
- Commissioned: 16 April 1945
- Decommissioned: 9 November 1946
- Fate: Transferred to the Republic of China

Taiwan
- Acquired: 27 August 1948
- Fate: Scrapped 16 January 1959

General characteristics
- Class & type: Admirable-class minesweeper
- Displacement: 650 tons
- Length: 184 ft 6 in (56.24 m)
- Beam: 33 ft (10 m)
- Draft: 9 ft 9 in (2.97 m)
- Propulsion: 2 × ALCO 539 diesel engines, 1,710 shp (1.3 MW); Farrel-Birmingham single reduction gear; 2 shafts
- Speed: 14.8 knots (27.4 km/h)
- Complement: 104
- Armament: 1 × 3"/50 caliber gun DP; 2 × twin Bofors 40 mm guns; 1 × Hedgehog anti-submarine mortar; 2 × Depth charge tracks

Service record
- Part of: US Pacific Fleet (1945-1946)
- Awards: 1 Battle star

USS Deft (AM-216) was an Admirable-class minesweeper built for the United States Navy during World War II. She was built to clear minefields in offshore waters, and served the Navy in the Pacific Ocean.

She was launched 28 March 1943 by Tampa Shipbuilding Co., Inc., Tampa, Florida; sponsored by Mrs. E. H. Jacobs; and commissioned 16 April 1945.

== World War II Pacific Ocean operations ==
Deft sailed from Norfolk, Virginia, 22 June 1945 and called at San Diego, California, Pearl Harbor, Saipan, and Okinawa before arriving at Sasebo, Japan, 21 September. She swept mines off the coast of Honshū, and served in various occupation duties until 15 December when she got underway for the West Coast.

Deft arrived at San Pedro, California, 4 April 1946 and remained there for local operations until 13 August when she sailed for the Philippines.

== Post-War decommissioning ==
She reached Subic Bay 24 October, was decommissioned 9 November 1946 and transferred to the Republic of China 27 August 1948. She was scrapped by the Chinese Navy 16 January 1959.

== Awards ==
Deft received one battle star for World War II service.
