= Soviet minesweeper T-113 =

Minesweeper of the Soviet Navy

History

United States
- Name: USS Alarm (AMc-117)
- Builder: Tampa Shipbuilding Company
- Reclassified: AM-140, 21 February 1942
- Laid down: 8 April 1942
- Launched: 7 December 1942
- Completed: 5 August 1943
- Fate: Transferred to the USSR, 5 August 1943
- Reclassified: MSF-140, 7 February 1955
- Stricken: 1 January 1983

History

Soviet Union
- Name: T-113
- Acquired: 10 July 1943
- Renamed: BSH-EYA, 8 October 1955
- Fate: Scrapped, 14 March 1960

General characteristics
- Class & type: Admirable-class minesweeper
- Displacement: 650 tons
- Length: 184 ft 6 in (56.24 m)
- Beam: 33 ft (10 m)
- Draft: 9 ft 9 in (2.97 m)
- Propulsion: 2 × ALCO 539 diesel engines, 1,710 shp (1.3 MW); Farrel-Birmingham single reduction gear; 2 shafts
- Speed: 14.8 knots (27.4 km/h)
- Complement: 104
- Armament: 1 × 3"/50 caliber gun DP; 2 × twin Bofors 40 mm L/60 guns; 1 × Hedgehog anti-submarine mortar; 2 × Depth charge tracks

T-113 was a minesweeper of the Soviet Navy during World War II and the Cold War. She had originally been built as USS Alarm (AM-140), an Admirable-class minesweeper, for the United States Navy during World War II, but never saw active service in the U.S. Navy. Upon completion she was transferred to the Soviet Union under Lend-Lease as T-113; she was never returned to the United States. The ship was eventually scrapped on 14 March 1960. Because of the Cold War, the U.S. Navy was unaware of this fate and the vessel remained on the American Naval Vessel Register until she was struck on 1 January 1983.

== Career ==
Alarm was laid down on 8 June 1942 at Tampa, Florida, by the Tampa Shipbuilding Co.; launched in December 1942; sponsored by Mrs. M. A. Lynch; and completed on 5 August 1943. She was transferred to the Soviet Navy that same day as T-113. She was never returned to U.S. custody and was scuttled by the Soviet Navy in the Barents Sea in 1956.

In Soviet service the vessel was renamed BSH-EYA on 8 October 1955. She was eventually scrapped on 14 March 1960.

Due to the ongoing Cold War, the U.S. Navy was unaware of this fate. They had reclassified the vessel as MSF-140 on 7 February 1955, and kept her on the American Naval Vessel Register until she was struck on 1 January 1983.

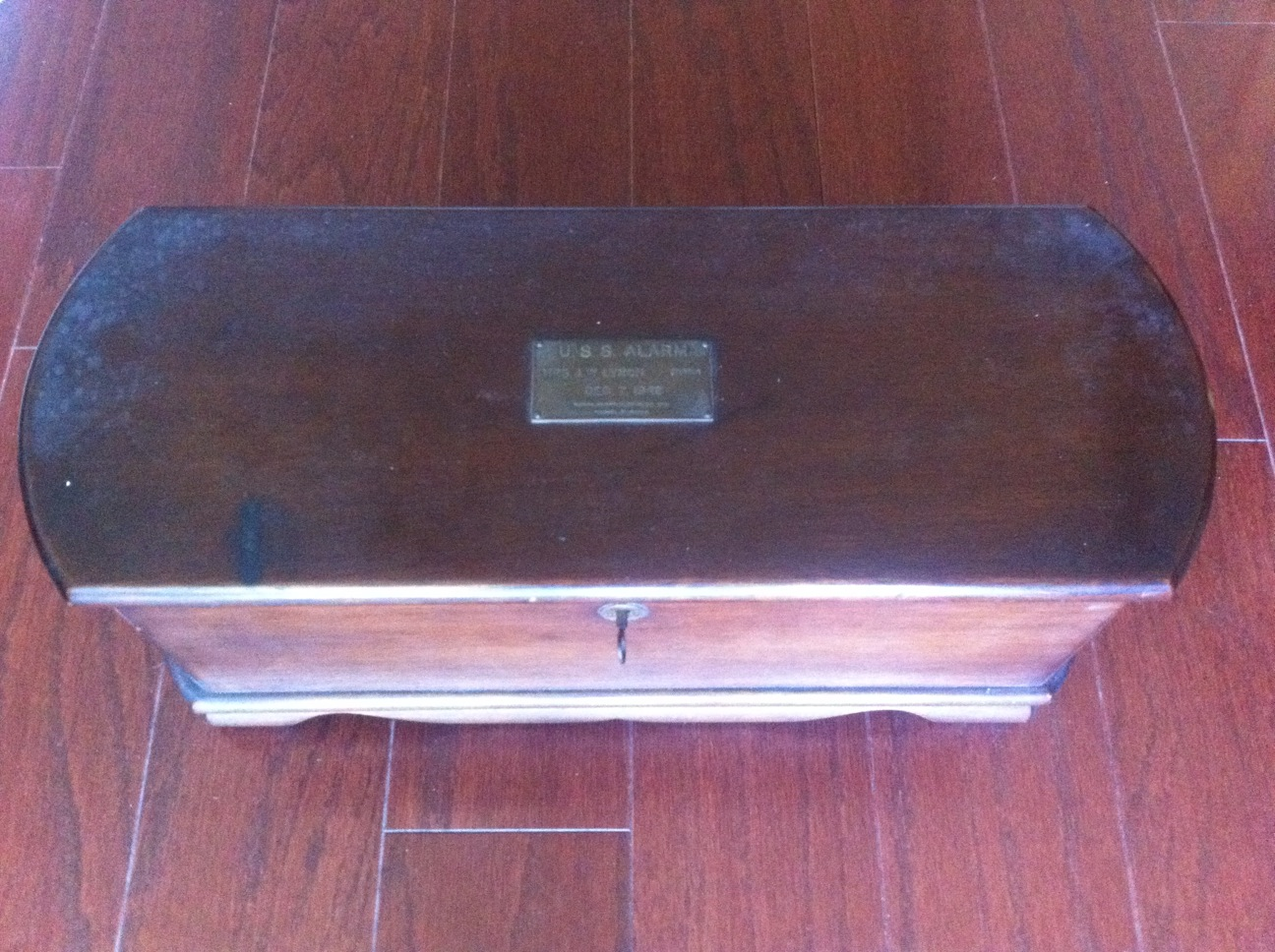
USS Alarm Christening Box

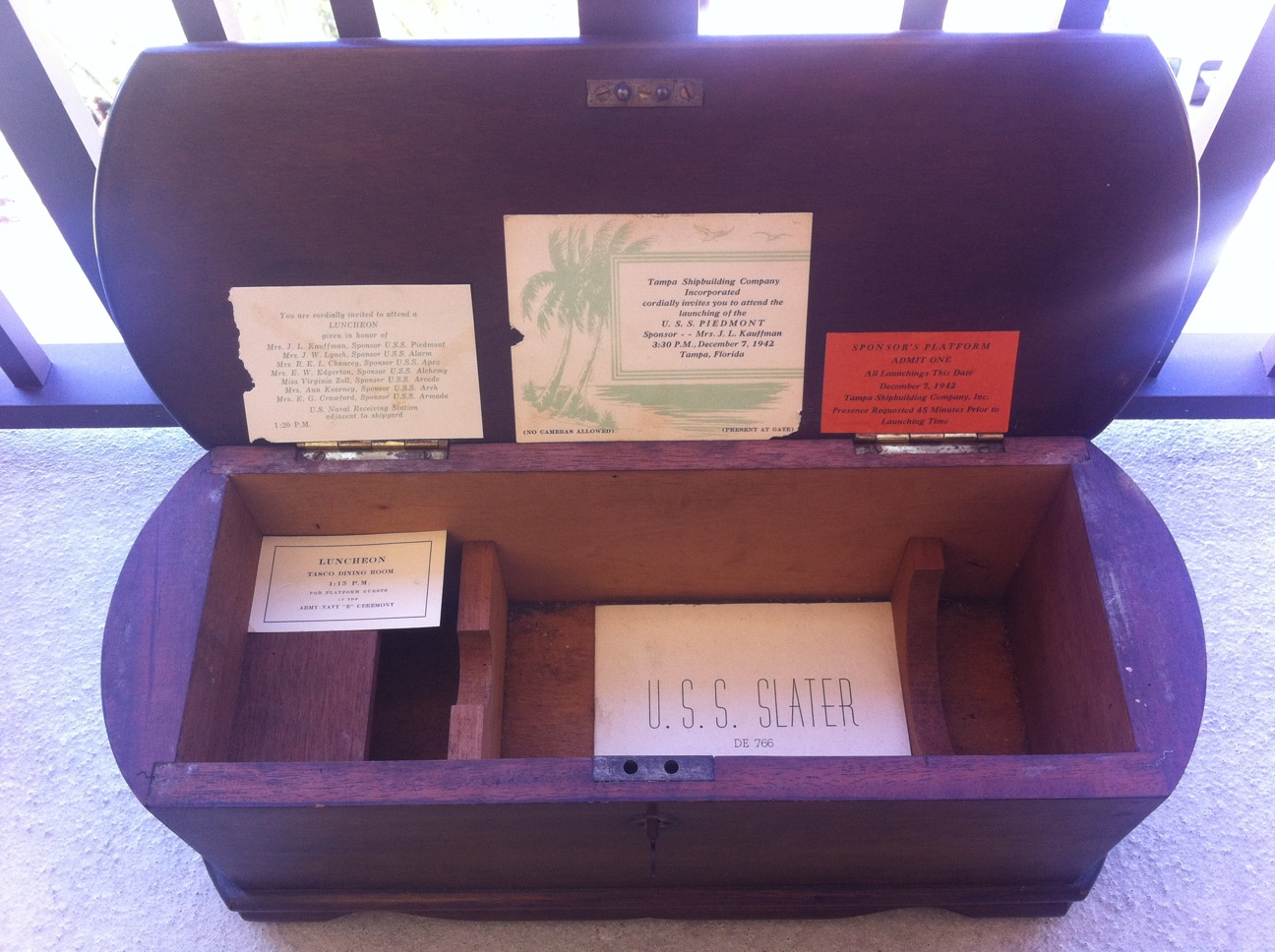
USS Alarm Christening Box
