= USS Clamour =

Minesweeper of the United States Navy

History

United States
- Name: USS Clamour
- Builder: Willamette Iron and Steel Works
- Laid down: 26 May 1942
- Launched: 15 December 1942
- Commissioned: 14 March 1944
- Decommissioned: 12 June 1946
- Reclassified: MSF-160, 7 February 1955
- Fate: Scrapped in 1959

General characteristics
- Class & type: Admirable-class minesweeper
- Displacement: 650 tons
- Length: 184 ft 6 in (56.24 m)
- Beam: 33 ft (10 m)
- Draft: 9 ft 9 in (2.97 m)
- Propulsion: 2 × ALCO 539 diesel engines, 1,710 shp (1.3 MW); Farrel-Birmingham single reduction gear; 2 shafts
- Speed: 14.8 knots (27.4 km/h)
- Complement: 104
- Armament: 1 × 3"/50 caliber gun DP; 2 × twin Bofors 40 mm guns; 1 × Hedgehog anti-submarine mortar; 2 × Depth charge tracks

Service record
- Part of: US Pacific Fleet (1944-1946)

USS Clamour (AM-160) was an Admirable-class minesweeper built for the U.S. Navy during World War II. She was built to clear minefields in offshore waters, and served the Navy in the Pacific Ocean.

She was launched 24 December 1942 by Willamette Iron and Steel Works, Portland, Oregon; commissioned 14 March 1944 and reported to the U.S. Pacific Fleet.

== World War II Pacific Ocean operations ==
Clamour arrived at Pearl Harbor 22 May 1944, and made two voyages as convoy escort to Kwajalein and Eniwetok between that time and 11 September, when she cleared Pearl Harbor for continued escort duty based at Eniwetok. She guarded convoys to the Marianas, adding Ulithi to her ports of call in November, Tarawa, and Majuro in May 1945, and Iwo Jima in June. She sailed from Eniwetok for the last time 10 August, bound for overhaul at Bremerton, Washington.

== World War II Documentary Photographs ==
One of the few photographic records of Naval Seamen on an active duty ship during World War II. The photographs are seen at U.S.S. Clamour The camera and film were confiscated by Cmdr. Lott, and locked in the ship's safe. Post War, on return to Seattle, the photographer, Robert Nielsen, saw that the camera and film were in the safe, and took them with him. These are the only known photographs of a Minesweeper during the War extant. This information is from the personal testimony of S/1st Nielsen.

== Post-War Decommissioning ==
On 13 January 1946, she arrived at San Diego, California, where she was decommissioned 12 June 1946, and placed in reserve. On 7 February 1955 she was reclassified MSF-160. She was scrapped in 1959.
