= USS Admirable =

Minesweeper of the United States Navy

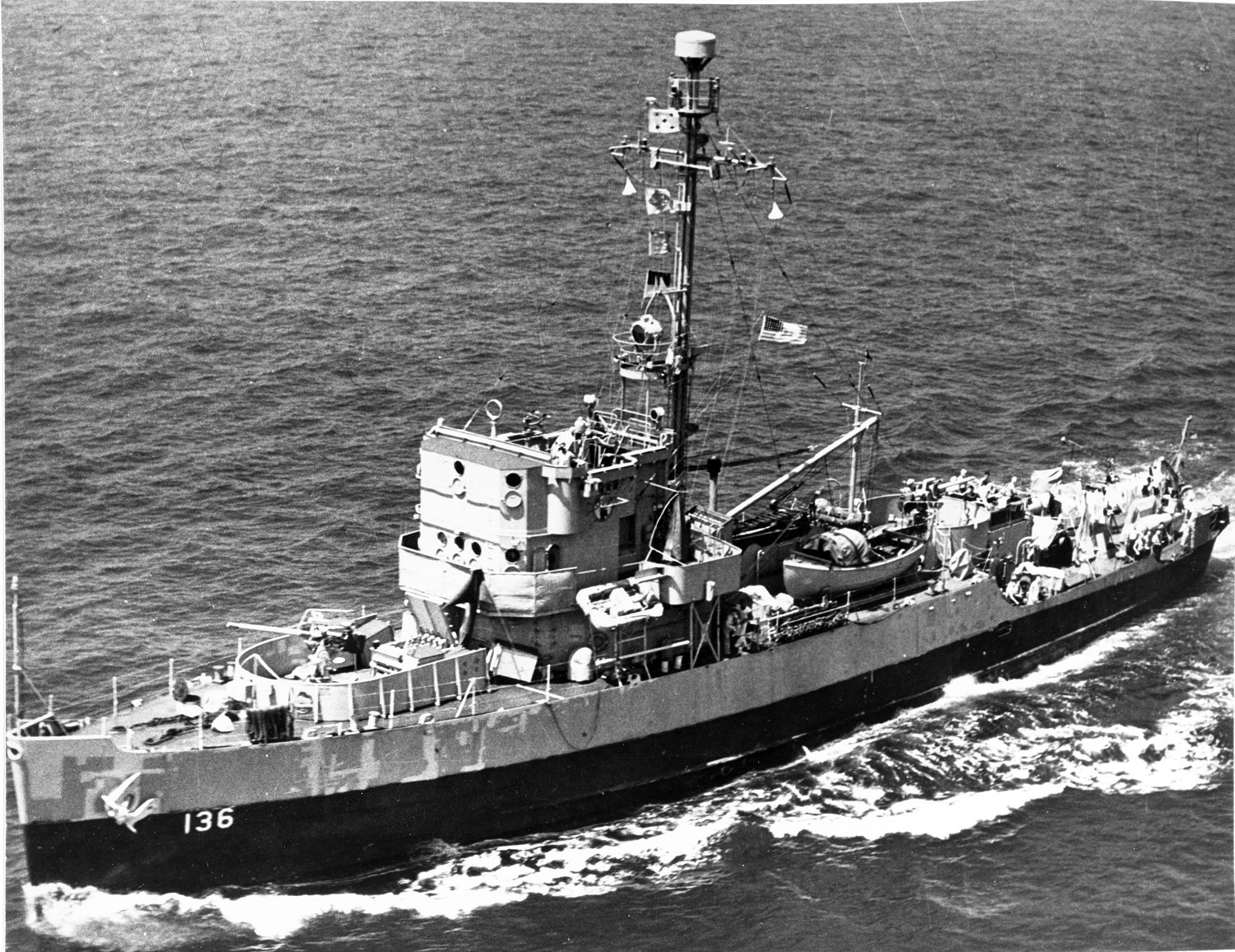
- USS Admirable (AM-136) underway in 1944.

History

United States
- Name: USS Admirable (AMc-113)
- Builder: Tampa Shipbuilding Company, Tampa, Florida
- Reclassified: AM-136, 21 February 1942
- Laid down: 8 April 1942
- Launched: 18 October 1942
- Sponsored by: Mrs. Ann Pillsbury Fehr
- Commissioned: 20 April 1943
- Decommissioned: 19 July 1945
- Fate: Transferred to Soviet Navy, 19 July 1945
- Reclassified: MSF-136, 7 February 1955
- Stricken: 1 January 1983

History

Soviet Union
- Name: T-331
- Acquired: 19 July 1945
- Commissioned: 19 July 1945
- Fate: Stricken 1958

General characteristics
- Class & type: Admirable-class minesweeper
- Displacement: 650 tons
- Length: 184 ft 6 in (56.24 m)
- Beam: 33 ft (10 m)
- Draft: 9 ft 9 in (2.97 m)
- Propulsion: 2 × ALCO diesel engines, 1,710 shp (1.3 MW); 2 shafts
- Speed: 15 knots (27.8 km/h)
- Complement: 104
- Armament: 1 × 3"/50 caliber gun; 6 × Oerlikon 20 mm cannon; 4 × Bofors 40 mm gun; 1 × Hedgehog; 4 × depth charge projectors; 2 × depth charge racks; 2 × Minesweeping paravanes

Service record
- Part of: United States Pacific Fleet (1943–1945); Soviet Pacific Ocean Fleet (1945-1958)

USS Admirable (AM-136) was the lead ship of her class of minesweeper built for the United States Navy during World War II. In commission from 1943 to 1945, she was transferred to the Soviet Navy in 1945 and served as T-331 until stricken in 1958.

== Construction and commissioning ==
Originally classified as a "coastal minesweeper," AMc-113, Admirable was reclassified as a minesweeper, AM-136, on 21 February 1942. She was laid down on 8 April 1942 at Tampa, Florida, by the Tampa Shipbuilding Company. She was launched on 18 October 1942, sponsored by Mrs. Ann Pillsbury Fehr, daughter of Commander Horace W. Pillsbury, and commissioned on 20 April 1943.

== Service history ==
=== U.S. Navy, World War II, 1943–1945 ===
Admirable departed Tampa on 23 April 1943 and conducted a shakedown cruise in the Gulf of Mexico before heading for Hampton Roads, Virginia, on 23 June 1943. Admirable operated out of Naval Amphibious Base Little Creek, Virginia, for five months of training in antisubmarine warfare, minelaying, and mine sweeping techniques. After upkeep and fitting-out, she departed Naval Station Norfolk, Virginia, on 28 November 1943 in company with the internal combustion engine repair ship USS Luzon (ARG-2) for duty in the Pacific. Transiting the Panama Canal on 8 December 1943, Admirable continued on to San Diego, California, where she moored on 18 December 1943. In January 1944, following tests at the West Coast Sound School, she received orders to proceed independently to Adak, Territory of Alaska. During the voyage, she encountered heavy seas which damaged her sonar gear. Following her arrival in Kuluk Bay, Adak Island, on 6 February 1944, she was drydocked for repairs.

On 13 February 1944, Admirable was assigned to Task Group 91.2 (TG 91.2). She operated from Adak, escorting merchant and troopships to such ports in Alaska and the Aleutian Islands as Kodiak, Dutch Harbor, Amchitka, Kiska, Cold Bay, and Attu Island. On four occasions during her 18-month tour in the Aleutians, Admirable went alongside the destroyer tender USS Black Hawk (AD-9) at Adak briefly to repair damage caused by the cold weather, heavy seas, and violent, gusting winds known as "williwaws".

In July 1944, Admirable began to clear the minefield in Chiniak Bay off Kodiak Island. She was the lead ship of a group, composed of the minesweepers USS Augury (AM-149), USS Agile (AMc-111), and USS Affray (AMc-112), and the auxiliary motor minesweeper USS YMS-285, which, on 2 August 1944, began a sweep of the channel to St. Paul's Harbor. The minesweepers then established patrols outside the harbor to await the arrival of President Franklin D. Roosevelt aboard the heavy cruiser USS Baltimore (CA-68). Roosevelt had left San Diego on 14 July, steamed to Pearl Harbor, Territory of Hawaii, to meet with General Douglas MacArthur and Admiral Chester Nimitz to discuss plans for the invasion of the Philippines, and stopped at Kodiak on 7 August 1944. Baltimore pulled out of St. Paul's Harbor the same day, and Roosevelt continued his journey back to the United States aboard the destroyer USS Cummings (DD-365). Admirable then resumed escort duty and continued that work into March 1945.

On 14 March 1945, Admirable's commanding officer was designated officer in tactical command of eight ships and all aircraft participating in a combined air-surface attack on a fictitious submarine in Kuluk Bay. The minesweeper then returned to her escort duties.

Selected for transfer to the Soviet Navy in Project Hula, a secret program for the transfer of U.S. Navy ships to the Soviet Navy at Cold Bay in anticipation of the Soviet Union joining the Pacific War, Admirable proceeded to Dutch Harbor in May 1945 for repairs preparatory to her transfer. Because of the continual beating of the heavy seas, 12 feet (3.7 meters) of the forward end of each of her bilge keels as well as her sonar gear were replaced. With her repairs complete, she then steamed to Cold Bay, where Soviet Navy Rear Admiral Boris Dmitrievich Popov, the Soviet commanding officer at Cold Bay under Project Hula, inspected Admirable on 30 May 1945 and accepted her for transfer to the Soviet Union. On 18 June 1945, a Soviet crew reported on board to train for one month in gunnery, engineering, and mine sweeping procedures.

=== Soviet Navy, 1945–1958 ===
Following the completion of training for her Soviet crew, Admirable was decommissioned on 19 July 1945 at Cold Bay and transferred to the Soviet Union under Lend-Lease immediately. Also commissioned into the Soviet Navy immediately, she was designated as a tralshik ("mine sweeper") and renamed T-331 in Soviet service. She soon departed Cold Bay bound for Petropavlovsk-Kamchatsky in the Soviet Union, where she served in the Soviet Far East.

In February 1946, the United States began negotiations for the return of ships loaned to the Soviet Union for use during World War II, and on 8 May 1947, United States Secretary of the Navy James V. Forrestal informed the United States Department of State that the United States Department of the Navy wanted 480 of the 585 combatant ships it had transferred to the Soviet Union returned. Deteriorating relations between the two countries as the Cold War broke out led to protracted negotiations over the ships, and by the mid-1950s the U.S. Navy found it too expensive to bring home ships that had become worthless to it anyway. Many ex-American ships were merely administratively "returned" to the United States and instead sold for scrap in the Soviet Union, while the U.S. Navy did not seriously pursue the return of others because it viewed them as no longer worth the cost of recovery. The Soviet Union never returned Admirable to the United States, although the U.S. Navy reclassified her as a "fleet minesweeper" (MSF) and renamed her MSF-136 on 7 February 1955.

== Disposal ==
T-331 was stricken in 1958 and apparently was sold for scrap in the Soviet Union. Unaware of this, the U.S. Navy retained Admirable on its Naval Vessel Register until finally striking her name on 1 January 1983.
