= USS Buoyant =

Minesweeper of the United States Navy

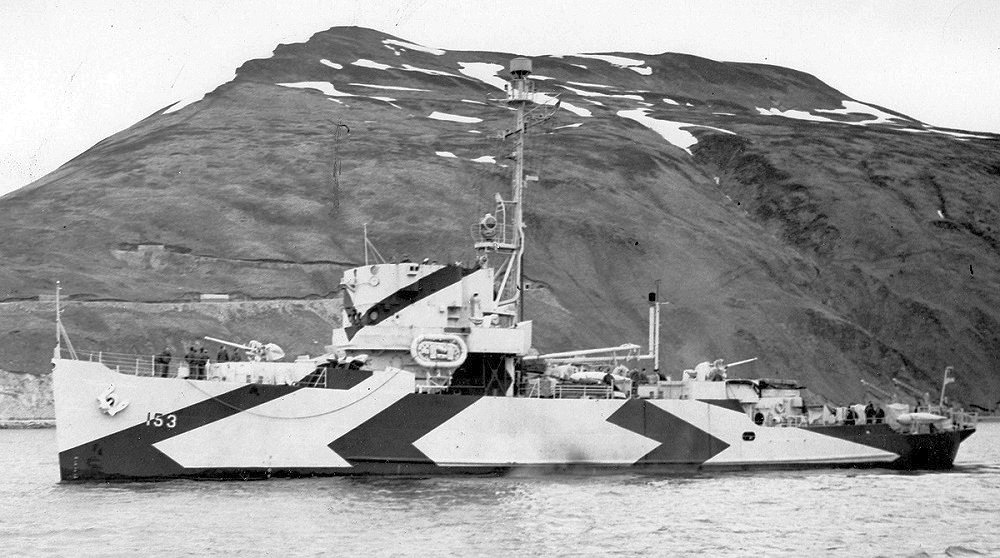
- Buoyant at Dutch Harbor, Alaska on 11 June 1944

History

United States
- Name: USS Buoyant (AM-153)
- Builder: Willamette Iron and Steel Works, Portland, Oregon
- Laid down: 15 April 1942
- Launched: 24 November 1942
- Commissioned: 30 September 1943
- Decommissioned: 29 May 1946
- Fate: Sold to the Republic of China, 29 May 1946

History

Taiwan
- Name: unknown
- Acquired: 29 May 1946
- Fate: unknown

General characteristics
- Class & type: Admirable-class minesweeper
- Displacement: 650 tons
- Length: 184 ft 6 in (56.24 m)
- Beam: 33 ft (10 m)
- Draft: 9 ft 9 in (2.97 m)
- Propulsion: 2 × ALCO 539 diesel engines, 1,710 shp (1.3 MW); Farrel-Birmingham single reduction gear; 2 shafts
- Speed: 14.8 knots (27.4 km/h)
- Complement: 104
- Armament: 1 × 3"/50 caliber gun DP; 2 × twin Bofors 40 mm guns; 1 × Hedgehog anti-submarine mortar; 2 × Depth charge tracks

Service record
- Part of: U.S. Pacific Fleet (1943-1946); Republic of China Navy (1946–unknown)
- Operations: Battle of Okinawa
- Awards: 1 Battle star

USS Buoyant (AM-153) was an Admirable-class minesweeper built for the U.S. Navy during World War II. After service in the Pacific, which netted her crew one battle star, she was decommissioned in May 1946 and sold to the Republic of China. Her name in Republic of China Navy service and her fate are not reported in secondary sources.

== Career ==
Buoyant was launched 24 November 1942 by Willamette Iron and Steel Works, Portland, Oregon, and commissioned 30 September 1943.

Buoyant arrived at Adak, Alaska, 30 December 1943 and engaged in escort duty along the Aleutian chain, making frequent stops at Kodiak, Dutch Harbor, Sand Bay, Amchitka, Adak, and Attu until 1 July 1944. In July she sailed to San Francisco, California, for a three-week availability at Treasure Island, California. On 1 August 1944 she escorted a convoy to Eniwetok via Pearl Harbor. On 4 September, at Saipan, she was assigned to the Forward Area Escort and Patrol Group. The ensuing six months were spent on the sea lanes between Saipan and Eniwetok providing escort protection for submarines, transports, and merchant ships.

Buoyant arrived off Kiese Shima, Okinawa, 31 March 1945 and assisted in the assault and occupation of Okinawa (31 March-31 May). During this period she took part in several sweeping operations. The ship returned to the United States 7 July. On 17 September she sailed for Pearl Harbor, the first leg of a voyage back to the Far East.

Buoyant arrived at Yokohama, Japan, 15 December 1945 and later moved to Sasebo, Japan, where she operated in support of the occupation until 8 March 1946. Arriving 13 March at Subic Bay, Philippine Islands, she reported to Commander, Philippine Sea Frontier; was demilitarized; and sailed for Shanghai, China, in April 1946.

Buoyant was decommissioned, 29 May 1946 at Shanghai, China and sold by the Office of Foreign Liquidation Commission the same day for transfer to the Republic of China. Fate unknown.

Buoyant received one battle star for her World War II service.
