= USS Graylag =

Minesweeper of the United States Navy

History

United States
- Name: USS Graylag
- Builder: Willamette Iron and Steel Works
- Laid down: 15 July 1943
- Launched: 4 December 1943
- Commissioned: 31 August 1945
- Decommissioned: 12 August 1946
- Reclassified: MSF-364, 7 February 1955
- Stricken: 1 October 1967
- Fate: Sold for scrap, 1 October 1967

General characteristics
- Class & type: Admirable-class minesweeper
- Displacement: 650 tons
- Length: 184 ft 6 in (56.24 m)
- Beam: 33 ft (10 m)
- Draft: 9 ft 9 in (2.97 m)
- Propulsion: 2 × ALCO 539 diesel engines, 1,710 shp (1.3 MW); Farrel-Birmingham single reduction gear; 2 shafts
- Speed: 14.8 knots (27.4 km/h)
- Complement: 104
- Armament: 1 × 3"/50 caliber gun DP; 2 × twin Bofors 40 mm guns; 1 × Hedgehog anti-submarine mortar; 2 × Depth charge tracks

Service record
- Part of: US Pacific Fleet (1945-1946); Atlantic Reserve Fleet (1946-1967)

USS Graylag (AM-364) was an Admirable-class minesweeper built for the U.S. Navy during World War II. She was built to clear minefields in offshore waters.

Graylag, a steel-hulled fleet minesweeper, was launched by Willamette Iron and Steel Works, Astoria, Oregon, 4 December 1943; and commissioned 31 August 1945.

== End-of-war activity ==
After steaming to San Diego, California, 11 October, Graylag got underway 1 November for Pearl Harbor, where she arrived eight days later. The ship picked up passengers and returned to San Diego 29 December.

Graylag then steamed by way of the Panama Canal to New Orleans, Louisiana, 7 December to 26 December 1945, and arrived 27 March 1946 at Orange, Texas, after overhaul.

== Post-war decommissioning ==
She decommissioned 12 August 1946, was placed in reserve, and remained there through 1967. Graylag's designation was changed to MSF-364 on 7 February 1955. Graylag was stricken from the Navy List 1 October 1967 and sold for scrap.
