= USS Magnet (AM-260) =

Minesweeper of the United States Navy

History

United States
- Name: USS Magnet (AM-260)
- Builder: American Ship Building Company
- Laid down: 13 March 1943
- Launched: 5 June 1943
- Commissioned: 10 March 1944
- Decommissioned: 28 August 1945
- Fate: Transferred to the Republic of China, 28 August 1945
- Stricken: 12 March 1948

History

Taiwan
- Name: ROCS Yung Ning 永寧
- Acquired: 28 August 1945
- Decommissioned: March 1st 1958
- Fate: Stranded from typhoon on 27 January 1958

General characteristics
- Class & type: Admirable-class minesweeper
- Displacement: 650 tons
- Length: 184 ft 6 in (56.24 m)
- Beam: 33 ft (10 m)
- Draft: 9 ft 9 in (2.97 m)
- Propulsion: 2 × ALCO 539 diesel engines, 1,710 shp (1.3 MW); Farrel-Birmingham single reduction gear; 2 shafts
- Speed: 14.8 knots (27.4 km/h)
- Complement: 104
- Armament: 1 × 3"/50 caliber gun DP; 2 × twin Bofors 40 mm guns; 1 × Hedgehog anti-submarine mortar; 2 × Depth charge tracks

Service record
- Part of: U.S. Atlantic Fleet (1944–1945); Republic of China Navy (1945–1958)

The second USS Magnet (AM-260) was an Admirable-class minesweeper built for the U.S. Navy during World War II. She was built to clear minefields in offshore waters, and served the Navy in the Atlantic Ocean.

== Career ==
Magnet was laid down by American Shipbuilding Co., Lorain, Ohio, 13 March 1943; launched 5 June 1943; sponsored by Mrs. John J. Boland; and commissioned 10 March 1944.

Following commissioning in the 9th Naval District, Magnet steamed down the Mississippi River en route to Norfolk, Virginia, reporting 17 April 1944. After shakedown in the Chesapeake Bay, she joined Mine Division 31 and, for the next 9 months operated out of Recife, Brazil, sweeping the main shipping channels of South American ports. She also escorted convoys to and from the West Indies, patrolled the harbor, and engaged in antisubmarine training.

On 10 March 1945 she was detached from the South Atlantic Forces and assigned to task group TG 23.2 at Miami, Florida. There she served as a school ship until 28 June, when she got underway for Norfolk.

On 18 August, after a brief overhaul, she returned to Miami, where she decommissioned on the 28th. Transferred to the Nationalist Chinese Government under the terms of lend lease the same day, she commissioned in that Navy as Yung Ning. The vessel was officially returned in accordance with the terms of the original loan, and then redelivered to the Republic of China under the Military Assistance Program, 7 February 1948. Magnet was struck from the Navy list 12 March 1948. She is believed to have been scrapped.
