= USS Strength =

Minesweeper of the United States Navy

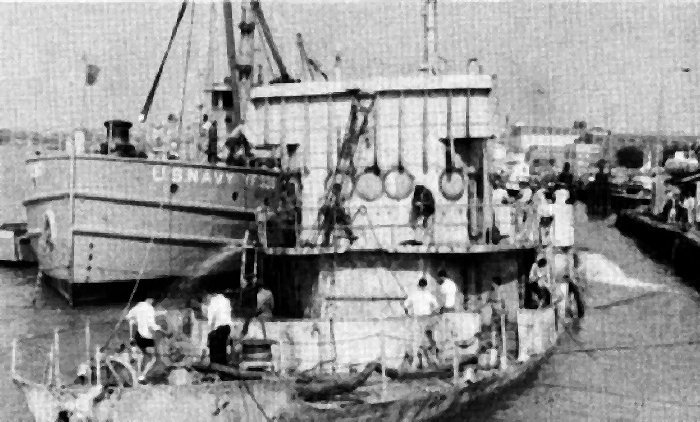

History

United States
- Name: USS Strength
- Builder: Associated Shipbuilders
- Laid down: 4 October 1943
- Launched: 28 March 1944
- Commissioned: 30 September 1944
- Decommissioned: 19 July 1946
- Reclassified: MSF-309, 7 February 1955
- Stricken: 1 April 1967
- Fate: Sunk as an artificial reef, 1987

General characteristics
- Class & type: Admirable-class minesweeper
- Displacement: 650 tons; 945 tons (full load)
- Length: 184 ft 6 in (56.24 m)
- Beam: 33 ft (10 m)
- Draft: 9 ft 9 in (2.97 m)
- Propulsion: 2 × 1,710 shp Cooper Bessemer GSB-8 diesel engines; National Supply Co. single reduction gear; 2 shafts
- Speed: 14.8 knots (27.4 km/h)
- Complement: 104
- Armament: 1 × 3"/50 caliber gun DP; 1 × twin Bofors 40 mm guns; 6 × Oerlikon 20 mm cannon; 1 × Hedgehog anti-submarine mortar; 4 × Depth charge projectors (K-guns); 2 × Depth charge racks

Service record
- Part of: US Pacific Fleet (1944-1946); Atlantic Reserve Fleet (1946-1967)
- Operations: Battle of Iwo Jima; Battle of Okinawa
- Awards: 3 Battle stars

USS Strength (AM-309) was a metal-hulled Admirable-class minesweeper built for the U.S. Navy during World War II. She received training in the United States before being sent directly to the Pacific Ocean to clear minefields so that Allied forces could proceed to beaches held by forces of the Empire of Japan. While performing this dangerous task, she was also attacked by Japanese planes and narrowly avoided being torpedoed. For her courageous actions in the war zone, she was awarded three battle stars.

She was laid down on 4 October 1943 by Associated Shipbuilders, Seattle, Washington; launched on 28 March 1944; sponsored by Mrs. H. W. McCurdy; and commissioned on 30 September 1944.

== Pacific Theatre operations ==
Strength completed fitting out at Seattle, Washington, sailed with Strategy on 20 October for San Pedro, California, and held her shakedown in the harbor of Los Angeles, California. After training at the Sound School in San Diego, California, the ship returned to San Pedro and got under-way on 3 December for Hawaii, arriving at Pearl Harbor on 10 December 1944. Strength was assigned to Mine Division 36 and began training with that unit at Lahaina Roads, Maui, rehearsing for the forthcoming invasion of Iwo Jima.

On 22 January 1945, Strength got underway for Ulithi with Task Group 51, LST Flotilla One in the screen for Tractor Group Able. The ships remained there from 3 to 5 February before steaming for the Marianas where final staging for the assault on Iwo Jima was held. Strength was detached from the screen to rejoin the other minesweepers of her division and they departed for the Volcanoes on the 13th

Strength arrived off Iwo Jima on 16 February and began sweeping operations to clear the way for the invasion fleet which arrived three days later. She continued sweeping operations and antisubmarine patrols until the end of the month when she steamed to Saipan. Her division sailed for the Carolines and arrived at Ulithi the next day.

== Under attack by Japanese planes and torpedoes ==
Strength and her sister ships sortied for the Ryūkyūs on 19 March. They began sweeping mines from the Kerama Retto area on 25 March in preparation for the assault the next day. On 26 March, a partially surfaced midget submarine was sighted at 1118 hours. Four torpedoes were fired at Strength. Two passed underneath her, and two sped by astern. She opened fire with her secondary batteries, but no damage was ascertained. She then assisted in clearing the approaches to the beaches off Okinawa for the impending assault on that island which began on 1 April. The Japanese launched their heaviest air attack by suicide planes against the American fleet on 6 April. One chose the minesweeper for its target, but her gunners set it afire, and it splashed several hundred yards astern. Strength, operated off Okinawa until retiring to Ulithi for repairs. She reached the lagoon on 24 May and remained for a month awaiting parts. Once the repairs had been completed, the minesweeper was assigned antisubmarine patrol in the waters surrounding Ulithi.

== Post-War operations ==
Strength was at Ulithi when the Japanese ceased hostilities. She sailed for Okinawa on 4 September and operated from 8 September until ordered to Sasebo where she rejoined her division. They swept known minefields between Kyūshū and Korea until early December. Strength was ordered to return to the United States, and she sailed from Sasebo on 10 December. She refueled at Ulithi, called at Pearl Harbor on 28 December 1945, and arrived at San Diego on 12 January 1946. The ship was routed onward to the East Coast for final disposition.

== End-of-War decommissioning ==
Strength arrived at Galveston, Texas, on 10 February and began a pre-inactivation overhaul. She moved to Orange, Texas, on 16 May and was assigned to the U.S. 16th Fleet. The ship was placed out of commission in reserve, on 19 July 1946. On 7 February 1955, Strength was reclassified MSF-309. Strength was struck from the Navy List on 1 April 1967.

== Awards ==
Strength received three battle stars for World War II service.
