= USS Prime (AM-279) =

Minesweeper of the United States Navy

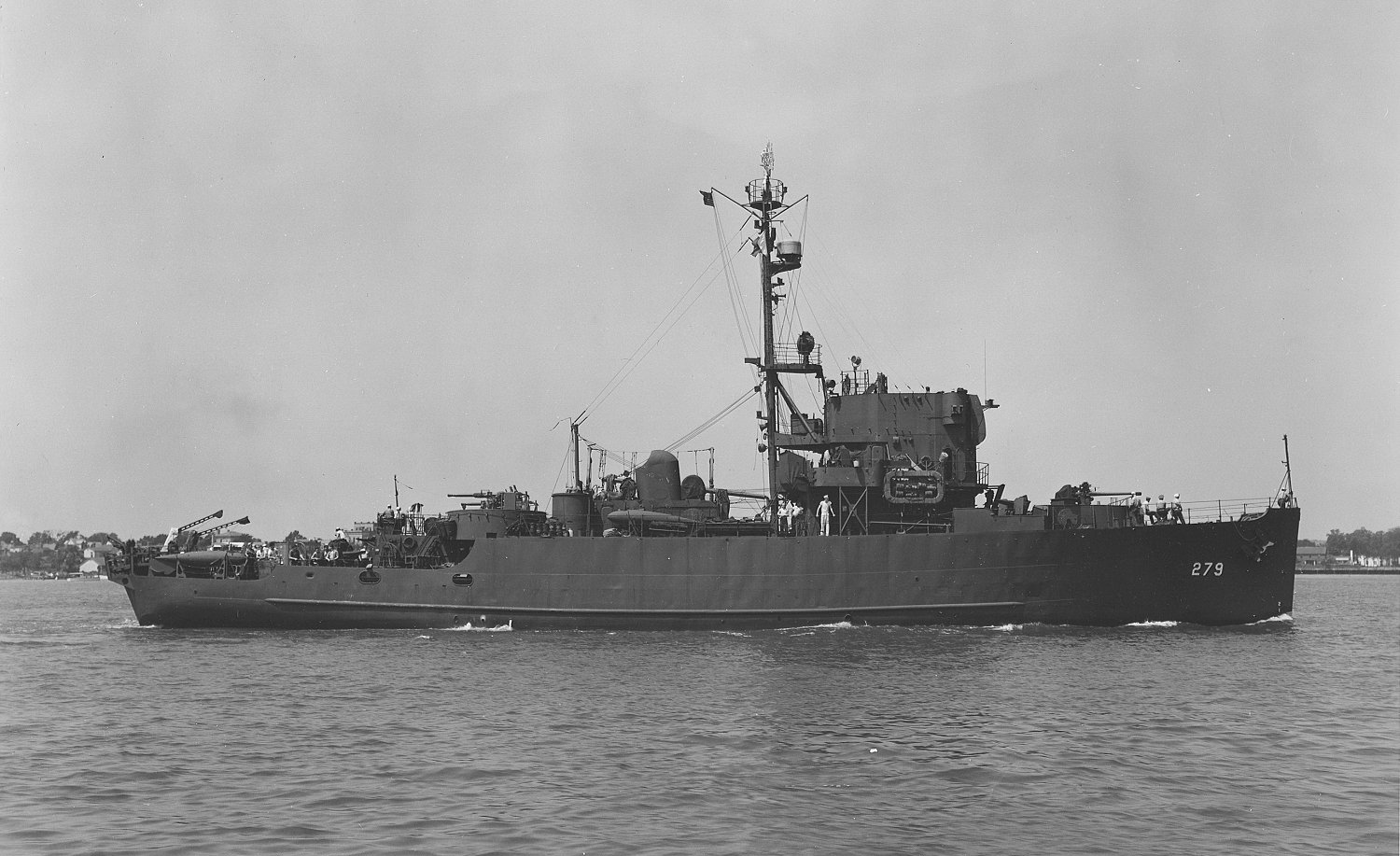

History

United States
- Name: USS Prime (AM-279)
- Builder: Gulf Shipbuilding Company
- Laid down: 15 September 1943
- Launched: 22 January 1944
- Commissioned: 12 September 1944
- Decommissioned: 29 May 1946
- Fate: Sold to the Republic of China, 1946
- Stricken: 1 May 1973

History

Taiwan
- Name: ROCS Yung Feng (MMC-50)
- Acquired: 1946
- Fate: Unknown

General characteristics
- Class & type: Admirable-class minesweeper
- Displacement: 650 tons; 945 tons (full load)
- Length: 184 ft 6 in (56.24 m)
- Beam: 33 ft (10 m)
- Draft: 9 ft 9 in (2.97 m)
- Propulsion: 2 × Cooper Bessemer GSB-8 diesel engines, 1,710 shp; National Supply Co. single reduction gear; 2 shafts
- Speed: 14.8 knots (27.4 km/h)
- Complement: 104
- Armament: 1 × 3"/50 caliber gun DP; 1 × twin Bofors 40 mm guns; 6 × Oerlikon 20 mm cannon; 1 × Hedgehog anti-submarine mortar; 4 × Depth charge projectors (K-guns); 2 × Depth charge racks

Service record
- Part of: US Pacific Fleet (1945-1946)

USS Prime (AM-279) was laid down 15 September 1943 by Gulf Shipbuilding Corp., Chickasaw, Alabama, launched 22 January 1944; sponsored by Mrs. L. W. Thompson, and commissioned 12 September 1944.

== World War II Pacific Theatre operations ==
Following shakedown off the east coast, USS Prime reported to Service Force Atlantic, Norfolk, Virginia, 1 December 1944. After duty off Bermuda and the east coast, she arrived at the Panama Canal Zone, and reported for duty to the U.S. Pacific Fleet 12 July 1945. In September, while at Okinawa, she was assigned to the Reserve Fleet. Following a change of assignment from the 19th to the U.S. 16th Fleet, she was marked expendable in March 1946. Demilitarized, she steamed to Shanghai, China.

== End-of-war deactivation ==
Prime was decommissioned 29 May 1946 and sold to China at Shanghai, China as Yung Feng (MMC-50) (Republic of China Navy), decommissioned and struck from the Naval Register 1 May 1973. Fate unknown.
