= USS Augury =

Minesweeper

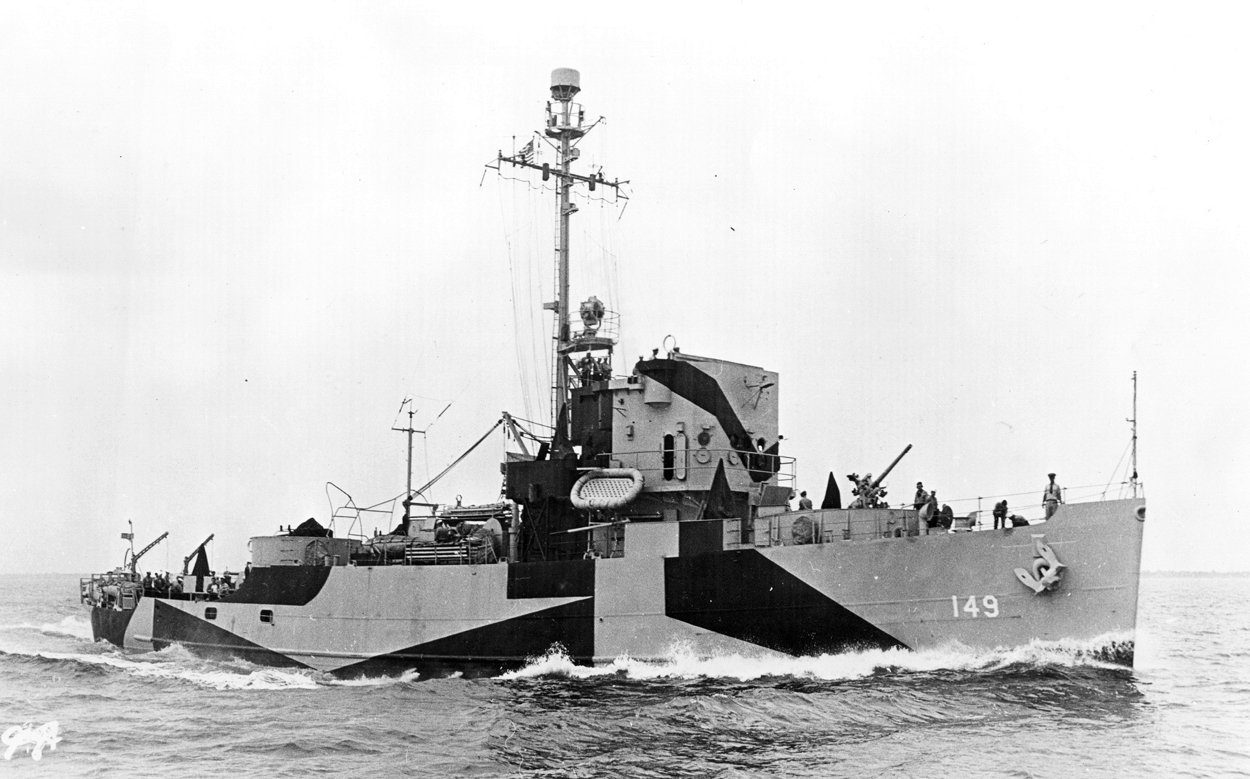
- Augury underway off of Tampa, Florida in March 1944

History

United States
- Name: USS Augury (AMc-126)
- Builder: Tampa Shipbuilding Company, Tampa, Florida
- Reclassified: AM-149, 21 February 1942
- Laid down: 7 December 1942
- Launched: 23 February 1943
- Sponsored by: Mrs. Helen K. MacLean
- Commissioned: 17 March 1944
- Decommissioned: 19 July 1945
- Fate: Transferred to the Soviet Union, 19 July 1945
- Reclassified: MSF-149, 7 February 1955
- Stricken: 1 January 1983

History

Soviet Union
- Name: T-334
- Acquired: 19 July 1945
- Commissioned: 19 July 1945
- Fate: Scrapped 1960

General characteristics
- Class & type: Admirable-class minesweeper
- Displacement: 650 tons
- Length: 184 ft 6 in (56.24 m)
- Beam: 33 ft (10 m)
- Draft: 9 ft 9 in (2.97 m)
- Propulsion: 2 × ALCO 539 diesel engines, 1,710 shp (1.3 MW); Farrel-Birmingham single reduction gear; 2 shafts
- Speed: 14.8 knots (27.4 km/h)
- Complement: 104
- Armament: 1 × 3"/50 caliber gun DP; 2 × twin Bofors 40 mm guns; 1 × Hedgehog anti-submarine mortar; 2 × depth charge tracks

Service record
- Part of: U.S. Pacific Fleet (1943-1945); Soviet Pacific Ocean Fleet (1945-1960)

USS Augury (AM-149) was an Admirable-class minesweeper built for the United States Navy during World War II and in commission from 1943 to 1945. In 1945, she was transferred to the Soviet Navy, in which she served as T-334.

== Construction and commissioning ==
Originally classified as a "coastal minesweeper," AMc-126, Augury was reclassified as a "minesweeper," AM-149, on 21 February 1942. She was laid down on 7 December 1942 at Tampa, Florida, by the Tampa Shipbuilding Company, Inc., launched on 23 February 1943, sponsored by Mrs. Helen K. MacLean, and commissioned on 17 March 1944.

== Service history ==
=== U.S. Navy, World War II, 1943-1945 ===
After fitting out, Augury completed shakedown training out of Little Creek, Virginia, between 8 April and 8 May 1943. On 10 May 1943, she got underway as part of the escort for a convoy bound for the United States West Coast. She and her charges arrived in the Panama Canal Zone on 19 May 1943, transited the Panama Canal soon thereafter, and continued on up the western coast of North America. Augury entered port at San Francisco, California, on 2 June 1943 and remained there until 22 June 1943, when she resumed her journey, shaping a course for the Territory of Alaska. She arrived at Kodiak, Alaska, on 29 June 1943 and reported for duty with Task Force (TF) 91. For the remainder of her U.S. Navy career, she plied the waters surrounding Kodiak Island and the Aleutian Islands, escorting ships between such ports as Kodiak, Dutch Harbor, Adak, Amchitka, Attu, Shemya, and Chernofski and conducted minesweeping operations in the bays, inlets, and passes along the Aleutian archipelago.

Selected for transfer to the Soviet Navy in Project Hula – a secret program for the transfer of U.S. Navy ships to the Soviet Navy at Cold Bay, Alaska, in anticipation of the Soviet Union joining the war against Japan – Augury began four weeks of familiarization training for her new Soviet crew at Cold Bay on 23 June 1945.

=== Soviet Navy, 1945-1960 ===
Following the completion of training for her Soviet crew, Admirable was decommissioned on 19 July 1945 at Cold Bay and transferred to the Soviet Union under Lend-Lease immediately. Also commissioned into the Soviet Navy immediately, she was designated as a tralshik ("minesweeper") and renamed T-334 in Soviet service. She soon departed Cold Bay bound for Petropavlovsk-Kamchatsky in the Soviet Union, where she served in the Soviet Far East.

In February 1946, the United States began negotiations for the return of ships loaned to the Soviet Union for use during World War II, and on 8 May 1947, United States Secretary of the Navy James V. Forrestal informed the United States Department of State that the United States Department of the Navy wanted 480 of the 585 combatant ships it had transferred to the Soviet Union for World War II use returned. Deteriorating relations between the two countries as the Cold War broke out led to protracted negotiations over the ships, and by the mid-1950s the U.S. Navy found it too expensive to bring home ships that had become worthless to it anyway. Many ex-American ships were merely administratively "returned" to the United States and instead sold for scrap in the Soviet Union, while the U.S. Navy did not seriously pursue the return of others because it viewed them as no longer worth the cost of recovery. The Soviet Union never returned Augury to the United States, although the U.S. Navy reclassified her as a "fleet minesweeper" (MSF) and redesignated her MSF-149 on 7 February 1955.

== Disposal ==
T-334 was scrapped in the Soviet Union in 1960. Unaware of her fate, the U.S. Navy kept Augury on its Naval Vessel Register until finally striking her on 1 January 1983.
