= USS Pinnacle (AM-274) =

Minesweeper of the United States Navy

History

United States
- Name: USS Pinnacle (AM-274)
- Builder: Gulf Shipbuilding Company
- Laid down: 1 February 1943
- Launched: 11 September 1943
- Commissioned: 24 May 1944
- Decommissioned: 9 October 1946
- Fate: Transferred to the Republic of China, 15 June 1948
- Stricken: July 1972

History

Taiwan
- Name: ROCS Yung Hsiu (MSF-48)
- Acquired: 15 June 1948
- Fate: Unknown

General characteristics
- Class & type: Admirable-class minesweeper
- Displacement: 650 tons; 945 tons (full load)
- Length: 184 ft 6 in (56.24 m)
- Beam: 33 ft (10 m)
- Draft: 9 ft 9 in (2.97 m)
- Propulsion: 2 × Cooper Bessemer GSB-8 diesel engines, 1,710 shp; National Supply Co. single reduction gear; 2 shafts
- Speed: 14.8 knots (27.4 km/h)
- Complement: 104
- Armament: 1 × 3"/50 caliber gun DP; 1 × twin Bofors 40 mm guns; 6 × Oerlikon 20 mm cannon; 1 × Hedgehog anti-submarine mortar; 4 × Depth charge projectors (K-guns); 2 × Depth charge racks

Service record
- Part of: US Atlantic Fleet (1944-1945); US Pacific Fleet (1945-1946)
- Awards: 2 Battle stars

USS Pinnacle (AM-274) was an Admirable class minesweeper of the US Navy during World War II. She was laid down by the Gulf Shipbuilding Corp., Chickasaw, Alabama, 1 February 1943 launched 11 September 1943 sponsored by Mrs. Francis W. Osborn; and commissioned 24 May 1944.

== World War II Invasion of Europe operations ==
Following shakedown, Pinnacle joined MinRon 11 and sailed, 24 July, for the Mediterranean. She arrived at Mers-el-Kebir 10 August, crossed to southern France 10 days later and on the 27th began her first minesweeping operation off St. Tropez. Shifting east with units of MinDiv 32 in September, she cleared a fire support channel from Cape Martin, France, to Bordinghera, Italy. There into late October, she suffered no damage from German shore batteries and on the 23rd sailed back to Toulon, thence to Bizerte, whence she steamed to Cagliari, Sardinia. Between 25 November and 10 January 1945, she swept in the Gulf of Cagliari with only one interruption, an escort run to Palermo in December.

== Supporting the Yalta Conference ==
From Sardinia Pinnacle returned to Palermo, whence, with USS Catoctin (AGC-5) she steamed to Istanbul. Arriving 25 January, she entered the Black Sea the next day, sweeping in shallow waters ahead of the AGC. Continuing on to Sevastopol and Yalta she supplied guards for the Yalta Conference, and on 13 February got underway for Sicily for repairs. She resumed sweeping off Sardinia in early March, interrupted operations toward the end of the month for a run to Malta, and on the 31st departed Sardinia for Palermo, Oran and the United States.

== Pacific Theatre operations ==
Arriving at Norfolk, Virginia, 5 May, she sailed for the west coast 5 July, mooring at San Pedro, California, on the 26th. In mid-August she moved on to Pearl Harbor thence to the Marianas, Okinawa, and Japan for minesweeping Operation Skagway.

Engaged in clearing the shipping lanes of the East China Sea-Ryukyu area, 27 October-9 November, Pinnacle shifted to Formosa and the Pescadores at mid-month and continued to operate there until 22 December when she put into Shanghai. Departing Shanghai 21 January 1946, she steamed back to Japan, thence to the Marianas, and on 18 March, arrived at San Pedro, California.

== Post-War Deactivation ==
In July Pinnacle headed west again. Arriving at Subic Bay, Philippine Islands, 14 September, she decommissioned 9 October 1946 at Sasebo, Japan, and remained in reserve there until 15 June 1948 when she was transferred, on a permanent basis, to the Nationalist Chinese Navy. Struck from the U.S. Navy List 13 July 1948 Pinnacle renamed Yung-Hsiu (MSF-48), patrolled the coast and offshore Islands of Taiwan into 1970. USS Pinnacle was struck from the Naval Register in July 1972. Fate unknown.

== Awards ==
USS Pinnacle (AM-274) earned 2 battle stars during World War II.
