= USS Peril =

Minesweeper of the United States Navy

History

United States
- Name: USS Peril (AM-272)
- Builder: Gulf Shipbuilding Corporation, Chickasaw, Alabama
- Laid down: 1 February 1943
- Launched: 25 July 1943
- Sponsored by: Mrs. Morris Sorbet
- Commissioned: 2 April 1944
- Decommissioned: 22 May 1945
- Fate: Transferred to Soviet Navy, 22 May 1945
- Reclassified: MSF-272, 7 February 1955
- Stricken: 1 January 1983

History

Soviet Union
- Name: T-281
- Acquired: 22 May 1945
- Commissioned: 22 May 1945
- Honors and awards: Guards rank and ensign, 26 August 1945, for World War II service
- Fate: Scrapped 1960

General characteristics
- Class & type: Admirable-class minesweeper
- Displacement: 650 tons
- Length: 184 ft 6 in (56.24 m)
- Beam: 33 ft (10 m)
- Draft: 9 ft 9 in (2.97 m)
- Propulsion: 2 × ALCO 539 diesel engines, 1,710 shp (1.3 MW); Farrel-Birmingham single reduction gear; 2 shafts
- Speed: 14.8 knots (27.4 km/h)
- Complement: 104
- Armament: 1 × 3"/50 caliber gun DP; 2 × twin Bofors 40 mm guns; 1 × Hedgehog anti-submarine mortar; 2 × depth charge tracks

Service record
- Part of: United States Atlantic Fleet (1944–1945); Soviet Pacific Ocean Fleet (1945–1960)

USS Peril (AM-272) was an Admirable-class minesweeper built for the United States Navy during World War II and in commission from 1944 to 1945. In 1945, she was transferred to the Soviet Union and after that served in the Soviet Navy as T-281.

== Career ==
Peril was laid down on 1 February 1943 at Chickasaw, Alabama, by the Gulf Shipbuilding Corporation. She was launched on 25 July 1943, sponsored by Mrs. Morris Sorbet, and commissioned on 20 April 1944.

== Service history ==
=== U.S. Navy, World War II, 1944–1945 ===
Peril departed Boston, on 5 February 1945, bound for Philadelphia, where she underwent overhaul from 8 to 27 February 1945.

Selected for transfer to the Soviet Navy in Project Hula – a secret program for the transfer of U.S. Navy ships to the Soviet Navy at Cold Bay, Territory of Alaska, in anticipation of the Soviet Union joining the war against Japan – Peril departed Philadelphia upon completion of her overhaul, transited the Panama Canal, and called at San Diego, Seattle, and Kodiak, Alaska, before arriving at Cold Bay on 28 April 1945 to train her new Soviet crew. Four Soviet Navy officers and 40 enlisted men reported aboard on 1 May 1945, and two more officers and 32 enlisted men came aboard on 6 May 1945.

=== Soviet Navy, 1945–1960 ===
Following the completion of training for her Soviet crew, Peril was decommissioned on 22 May 1945 at Cold Bay and transferred to the Soviet Union under Lend-Lease immediately. Also commissioned into the Soviet Navy immediately, she was designated as a tralshik ("minesweeper") and renamed T-281 in Soviet service. She soon departed Cold Bay bound for Petropavlovsk-Kamchatsky in the Soviet Union, where she entered service with the Soviet Pacific Ocean Fleet on 27 June 1945.

After the Soviet Union entered the war on 8 August 1945, T-281 participated in the Soviet offensive against Japanese forces in Northeast Asia, including the Soviet amphibious landing at Rajin-Sŏnbong, Korea, on 12 August 1945.

In February 1946, the United States began negotiations for the return of ships loaned to the Soviet Union for use during World War II, and on 8 May 1947, United States Secretary of the Navy James V. Forrestal informed the United States Department of State that the United States Department of the Navy wanted 480 of the 585 combatant ships it had transferred to the Soviet Union for World War II use returned. Deteriorating relations between the two countries as the Cold War broke out led to protracted negotiations over the ships, and by the mid-1950s the U.S. Navy found it too expensive to bring home ships that had become worthless to it anyway. Many ex-American ships were merely administratively "returned" to the United States and instead sold for scrap in the Soviet Union, while the U.S. Navy did not seriously pursue the return of others because it viewed them as no longer worth the cost of recovery. The Soviet Union never returned Peril to the United States, although the U.S. Navy reclassified her as a "fleet minesweeper" (MSF) and redesignated her MSF-272 on 7 February 1955.

== Disposal ==
T-281 was scrapped in 1960. Unaware of her fate, the U.S. Navy kept Peril on its Naval Vessel Register until finally striking her on 1 January 1983.

== Awards ==
The Soviet Union awarded T-281 the Guards rank and ensign on 26 August 1945 for her participation in operations against Japan in August 1945.
