= USS Strategy =

Minesweeper of the United States Navy

History

United States
- Name: USS Strategy
- Builder: Associated Shipbuilders
- Laid down: 4 October 1943
- Launched: 28 March 1944
- Commissioned: 22 September 1944
- Decommissioned: 10 May 1946
- Reclassified: MSF-308, 7 February 1955
- Stricken: 1 October 1967
- Fate: Sold for scrap, 1969

General characteristics
- Class & type: Admirable-class minesweeper
- Displacement: 650 tons; 945 tons (full load)
- Length: 184 ft 6 in (56.24 m)
- Beam: 33 ft (10 m)
- Draft: 9 ft 9 in (2.97 m)
- Propulsion: 2 × 1,710 shp (1,280 kW) Cooper Bessemer GSB-8 diesel engines; National Supply Co. single reduction gear; 2 shafts
- Speed: 14.8 knots (27.4 km/h)
- Complement: 104
- Armament: 1 × 3"/50 caliber gun DP; 1 × twin Bofors 40 mm guns; 6 × Oerlikon 20 mm cannon; 1 × Hedgehog anti-submarine mortar; 4 × Depth charge projectors (K-guns); 2 × Depth charge racks

Service record
- Part of: US Pacific Fleet (1944-1946); Atlantic Reserve Fleet (1946-1967)
- Operations: Battle of Iwo Jima; Battle of Okinawa
- Awards: 4 Battle stars

USS Strategy (AM-308) was a steel-hulled Admirable-class minesweeper built for the U.S. Navy during World War II. She had a courageous and adventurous life in clearing minefields in areas controlled by Japanese forces. She survived attacks by Japanese gunfire and planes, and won four battle stars for her service under battle conditions.

She was laid down on 4 October 1943 by Associated Shipbuilders, Seattle, Washington; launched on 28 March 1944; sponsored by Mrs. J. E. Kelley; and commissioned on 22 September 1944.

== World War II Pacific Theatre operations ==
Strategy sailed on 20 October for San Pedro, California, and held her shakedown in Los Angeles Harbor. After sound training at San Diego, California, she returned to San Pedro. On 6 December, she got underway for Hawaii and arrived at Pearl Harbor on 14 December. She was attached to Mine Division 36 and began rehearsals at Lahaina Roads, Maui, for the invasion of Iwo Jima.

Strategy sortied with Task Group 51, LST Flotilla One, in the screen of Tractor Group Able, for Ulithi on 22 January 1945. The group remained there from 3 to 5 February and then steamed to the Mariana Islands where final staging for the Iwo Jima operation was begun. She was detached from the screen and, with her division, sailed for Iwo Jima on the 13th. The mine division arrived off that island three days later and began sweeping mines for the landings which began on the 19th. The ship remained off Iwo Jima until 28 February when she sailed to Saipan. Strategy arrived on 5 March and, two days later, steamed to Ulithi to rejoin her division.

== Under attack by Japanese planes ==
Strategy reached Ulithi on 8 March; rejoined her unit; and, on 19 March, was underway for the Ryukyu Islands. There, the division began sweeping mines on 25 March to clear the way for U.S. Army landings the next day. The minesweeper then helped clear the approaches to Okinawa for the impending invasion of 1 April. One of the war's heaviest attacks by Japanese suicide planes occurred on 6 April. One plane made a glide approach on a nearby merchant ship, and the minesweeper opened fire with all of its guns. A wing tank was hit, and the plane burst into flames and fell short of its target. Another followed within two minutes, and the guns from Strategy soon had it blazing, but it banked and crashed into SS Logan Victory. The sweeper closed the ammunition-laden merchantman and rescued 48 survivors. Strategy operated in the Okinawa area until 5 May when she departed for Ulithi.

The ship put in at Ulithi on 9 May and refitted there until the 20th when she and other ships of her division escorted a resupply convoy back to Okinawa, arriving a week later. Strategy operated from Kerama Retto until 31 July. In June, she helped clear area "Zebra" in the East China Sea of an antisubmarine minefield. She then aided in clearing another area of about 7,500 square miles (19,000 km^{2}) northwest of Okinawa, almost to Kyūshū. The operation took more than three weeks, after which the ship returned to Buckner Bay for logistics. On 6 August, she sailed for Leyte for an availability period.

== End-of-War operations ==
Strategy was at Leyte when hostilities with Japan ceased. The ship sailed for Japan on 28 August. At Kii Suido, Wakayama, Honshū, she swept mines for the occupation forces until 5 October. The ship then moved to Nagoya, Japan, on 7 October and remained in that area until the 19th when she went to Sasebo. She rejoined Mine Squadron 36 in sweeping known minefields from Kyūshū to Korea until early December. Strategy sailed from Japan on 12 December 1945, en route to the California coast, via Eniwetok and Pearl Harbor.

== End-of-War deactivation ==
Strategy reached San Diego, California, on 12 January 1946 and was routed onward to the east coast for disposition. She arrived at Galveston, Texas, on 10 February, for a pre-inactivation overhaul. The minesweeper then moved to Orange, Texas, on 10 May 1946 and, four days later, was decommissioned and assigned to the U.S. 16th Fleet. Strategy was redesignated MSF-308 on 7 February 1955 while in reserve. Strategy was struck from the Navy List on 1 October 1967.

== Awards ==
Strategy received four battle stars for World War II service.
