= USS Scurry =

Minesweeper of the United States Navy

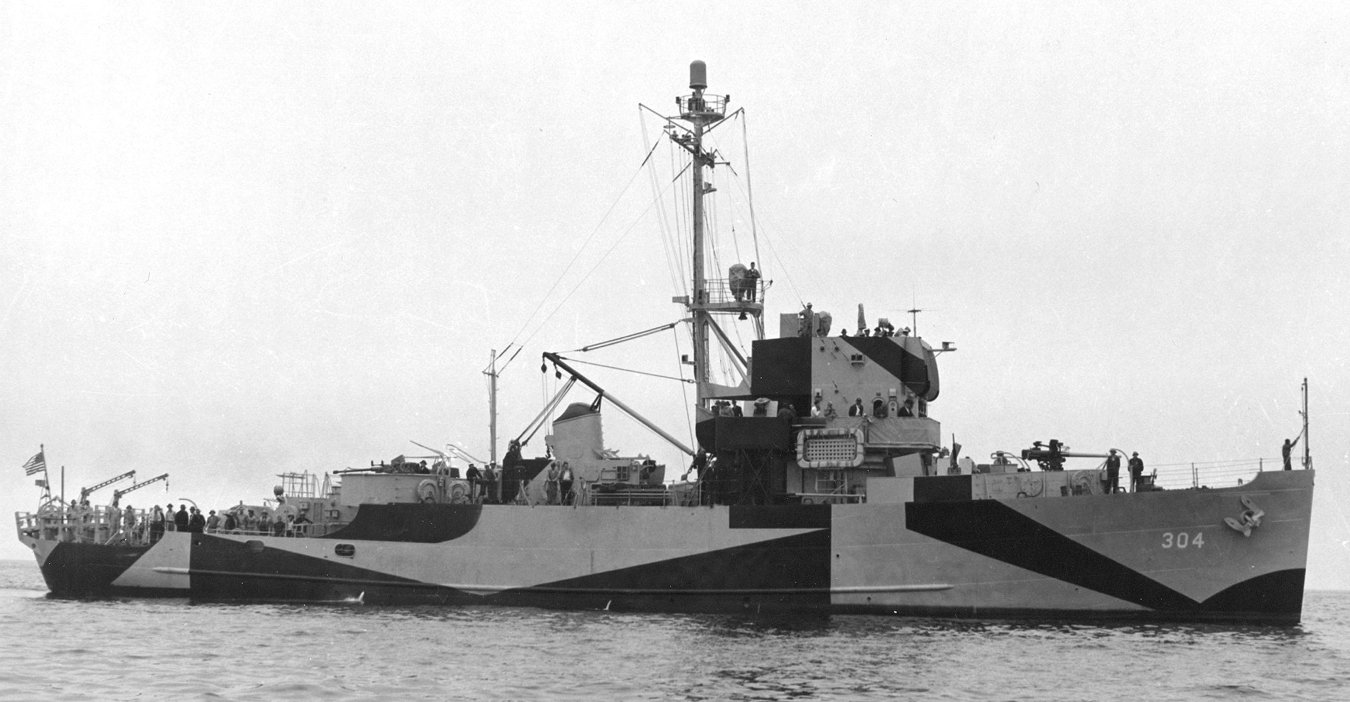
- Scurry underway off Seattle, Washington, 25 July 1944

History

United States
- Name: USS Skurry
- Builder: Associated Shipbuilders
- Laid down: 24 May 1943
- Launched: 1 October 1943
- Commissioned: 29 July 1944
- Decommissioned: 22 June 1946
- Renamed: USS Scurry, 3 August 1944
- Reclassified: MSF-304, 7 February 1955
- Stricken: 1 May 1967
- Fate: Sunk as a target off the Virginia Capes, 14 August 1967

General characteristics
- Class & type: Admirable-class minesweeper
- Displacement: 650 tons; 945 tons (full load)
- Length: 184 ft 6 in (56.24 m)
- Beam: 33 ft (10 m)
- Draft: 9 ft 9 in (2.97 m)
- Propulsion: 2 × Cooper Bessemer GSB-8 diesel engines, 1,710 shp (1,280 kW); National Supply Co. single reduction gear; 2 shafts
- Speed: 14.8 knots (27.4 km/h)
- Complement: 104
- Armament: 1 × 3"/50 caliber gun; 1 × twin Bofors 40 mm guns; 6 × Oerlikon 20 mm cannons; 1 × Hedgehog anti-submarine mortar; 4 × Depth charge projectors (K-guns); 2 × Depth charge tracks

Service record
- Part of: US Pacific Fleet (1944-1946); Atlantic Reserve Fleet (1946-1967)
- Operations: Battle of Iwo Jima; Battle of Okinawa
- Awards: 4 Battle stars

USS Scurry (AM-304) was a steel-hulled Admirable-class minesweeper constructed for the U.S. Navy during World War II. She was crewed by sailors who were trained in minesweeping, and quickly sent to the Pacific Ocean to clear minefields so that Allied forces could invade Japanese-held beaches. For this dangerous work, often under enemy fire, she was awarded four battle stars.

She was laid down on 24 May 1943 by Associated Shipbuilders, Seattle and launched on 1 October 1943; sponsored by Miss Winette DeLaye. The minesweeper was commissioned on 29 July 1944. The spelling of her name was changed from Skurry to Scurry on 3 August 1944.

== World War II Pacific Theatre operations ==
Following shakedown between 15 August and 19 September 1944, Scurry departed the west coast on 1 October escorting a convoy to Eniwetok. After arriving there on 3 November, Scurry escorted convoys in the vicinity of Eniwetok and Manus until returning to Pearl Harbor on 13 December. Between 31 December 1944 and 18 January 1945, the ship underwent two six-day periods of minesweeping training off Maui.

== Supporting the Invasions of Iwo Jima and Okinawa ==
She sailed on 22 January to support the landings at Iwo Jima. Arriving there three days before the assault she swept the assault and transport areas in preparation for the larger ships. Departing Iwo Jima on 3 March, the ship arrived off Okinawa on 25 March and carried out a week of preparatory sweeps before the landings there. She remained off Okinawa until 8 July, sweeping mines and maintaining antisubmarine patrols around the transports. The minesweeper underwent overhaul at Leyte, Philippines, from 13 July to 17 August and, after escorting a convoy to Okinawa, sailed from there on 30 August to clear minefields off Japan.

== End-of-War Pacific Theater operations ==
Scurry swept mines in the Yellow Sea between 1 and 7 September, and then helped to sweep the approaches to Sasebo and Nagasaki, Japan. She was one of the last American ships to enter these ports after the war. Between 17 and 26 September, she acted as pilot vessel at Nagasaki for transports repatriating Allied prisoners of war. She then returned to mine clearance operations, sweeping in the Korea Strait until sailing from Sasebo for the United States on 10 December.

== Post-war decommissioning ==
The minesweeper arrived at Orange, Texas, on 24 April 1946, and was decommissioned and placed in reserve there on 29 June 1946.

Scurry was reclassified MSF-304 on 7 February 1955. She was struck from the Naval Vessel Register on 1 May 1967 and converted into a salvage training hulk for use by the U.S. Navy at Norfolk, Virginia. Used as a test target Scurry was sunk off the Virginia Capes on 14 August 1967.

== Awards ==
Scurry received 4 battle stars for her World War II service.
