= USS Design =

Minesweeper of the United States Navy

History

United States
- Laid down: 12 March 1943
- Launched: 6 February 1944
- Commissioned: 29 June 1944
- Decommissioned: 24 August 1946
- Reclassified: MSF-219, 7 February 1955
- Stricken: 1960
- Fate: Unknown

General characteristics
- Class & type: Admirable-class minesweeper
- Displacement: 945 tons (full load)
- Length: 184.5 ft (56.2 m)
- Beam: 33 ft (10 m)
- Draft: 9.75 ft (2.97 m)
- Propulsion: 2 × 1,710 shp Cooper Bessemer GSB-8 diesel engines; National Supply Co. single reduction gear, 2 shafts
- Speed: 14.8 knots (17.0 mph; 27.4 km/h)
- Complement: 104
- Armament: 1 × 3"/50 caliber gun DP; 1 × twin Bofors 40 mm gun; 6 × 20 mm guns; 1 × Hedgehog anti-submarine mortar; 4 × Depth charge projectors (K-guns); 2 × Depth charge tracks

Service record
- Part of: US Pacific Fleet (1944-1946)
- Operations: Mariana and Palau Islands campaign; Battle of Okinawa
- Awards: 3 Battle stars

USS Design (AM-219) was a steel-hulled Admirable class minesweeper built for the U.S. Navy during World War II. A crew, trained in minesweeping, boarded the new vessel, and proceeded to the Pacific Ocean to clear minefields so that Allied forces could safely invade Japanese-held beaches. For this dangerous work under combat conditions she was awarded three battle stars.

Design was launched 6 February 1944 by Tampa Shipbuilding Co., Tampa, Florida; sponsored by Miss Joan Dall; and commissioned 29 June 1944.

== World War II Pacific Theatre operations ==
Design sailed from New York 8 September 1944 and escorted a convoy to Pearl Harbor, returning to San Francisco, California, on similar duty 20 November. Three days later she sailed to Seattle, Washington, to pick up another convoy for Pearl Harbor, where she arrived 9 December, en route west.

From her arrival at Eniwetok 29 December 1944 until 19 March 1945, Design operated on convoy to and patrol duty at Kossol Roads, Palau; Saipan; Ulithi; Guam; Hollandia, New Guinea; and San Pedro Bay, Leyte.

== Pre-invasion minesweeping operations at Okinawa ==
Design arrived off Okinawa 26 March for pre-invasion minesweeping, during which she rescued the survivors of YMS-1 class minesweeper YMS-103 which had struck a mine. On 4 July she sailed to sweep in support of the U.S. 3rd Fleet operations against Japan until the last day of the month.

== End-of-War operations ==
After brief overhaul at San Pedro Bay, Design returned to Okinawa 1 September 1945 and sailed a week later to clear Wakanoura Wan, Honshū, Japan, for occupation landings. She continued to sweep mines off Nagoya, Japan, and in the East China Sea, then departed Sasebo 20 November for the west coast, arriving at San Diego, California, 19 December. On 10 January 1946 she got underway for Galveston, Texas, and Orange, Texas.

== Post-War decommissioning ==
She was placed in commission in reserve there 14 May 1946 and out of commission in reserve 24 August 1946. She was reclassified MSF-219, 7 February 1955.

Design was stricken at the end of 1960.

== Awards ==
Design received three battle stars for World War II service.
