= USS Pontiac (AF-20) =

Cargo ship of the United States Navy

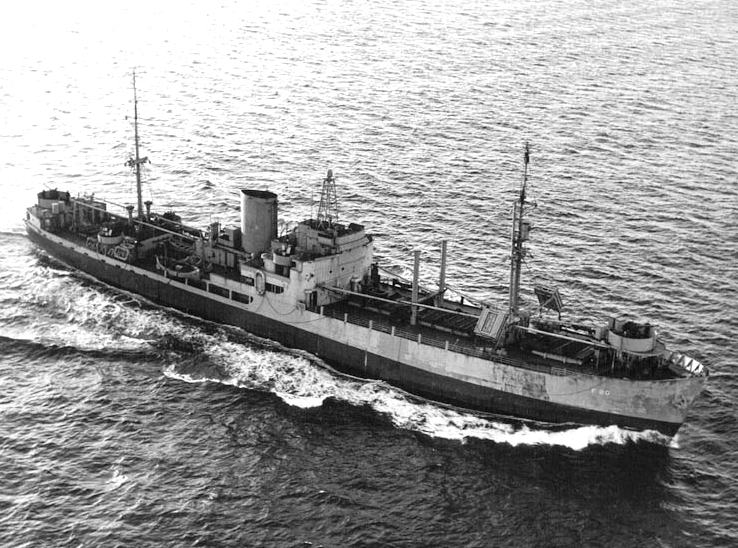
- Pontiac underway 21 August 1944

History
- Name: Australian Reefer (1937-1941); Pontiac (1941-1945)
- Owner: Lauritzen, Esbjerg, Denmark (1937-1941); United States Maritime Administration (1941-1945)
- Operator: Lauritzen, Esbjerg, Denmark (1937-1941); War Shipping Administration agent: United States Lines (1941-1942); U.S. Navy (1942—1945)
- Port of registry: Esbjerg, Denmark (Australian Reefer)
- Builder: Nakskov Skibsværft A/C, Nakskov, Denmark
- Yard number: 79
- Launched: 6 February 1937
- Identification: Australian Reefer signal: OZKH
- Fate: Sunk: 30 January 1945; Raised: 17 February 1945; Delivered to be scrapped: 22 May 1946

General characteristics
- Type: Refrigerated cargo
- Tonnage: 2,321 GRT, 1,289 NRT
- Displacement: 5,410 tons
- Length: 447 ft 10 in (136.5 m) LOA; 332.6 ft (101.4 m) Registry
- Beam: 47.8 ft (14.6 m)
- Draft: 18 ft 11 in (5.8 m)
- Depth: 17.2 ft (5.2 m)
- Decks: 1
- Propulsion: 10 cy. Burmeister & Wain diesel
- Crew: Commercial: unknown; Navy: 166 officers and enlisted
- Notes: Ammonia based refrigeration with granulated cork insulation.; Navy, armament: 2 × single 3"/50 caliber guns; 2 × twin 20 mm gun mounts

USS Pontiac (AF-20) was the Danish refrigerated cargo ship Australian Reefer that sought refuge in the neutral United States when Germany occupied Denmark in April 1940. In 1941 the United States seized 40 Danish ships idle in its ports with Australian Reefer being among those ships.

The ship was turned over to the War Shipping Administration (WSA) on 12 July 1941 and put into operation with United States Lines as its agent. Australian Reefer operated under a United States Army Transportation Corps agreement until 11 May 1942 when the ship was transferred to the Navy under bareboat charter. After conversion and being renamed Pontiac the ship served as a refrigerator ship or reefer ship, and provided food to Allied forces in the North Atlantic Ocean.

Pontiac was heavily damaged on 30 January 1945 by being holed by a paravane off Halifax, Nova Scotia causing the ship to sink. After being raised the ship was towed to Norfolk, Virginia and declared a total constructive loss on 13 April 1945. The actual title to the ship was requisitioned and the Danish owner paid compensation on 12 July 1945.

== Service career ==
Australian Reefer, a refrigerator ship built as hull 79 by Nakskov Skibsværft A/C, Nakskov, Denmark was launched 6 February 1937. Registry as of 1940 was at the port of Esbjerg, Denmark for a motor ship owned and operated by J. Lauritzen, Esbjerg, of 2,321 GRT, 1,289 NRT, 332.6 ft (101.4 m) registry length, 47.8 ft (14.6 m) beam and hold depth of 17.2 ft (5.2 m) with signal OZKH. Australian Reefer was propelled by a 10-cylinder Burmeister & Wain diesel engine. The ship operated between Denmark, New York and South America until after the occupation of Denmark by German forces.

The Danish ship was one of forty Danish merchant vessels, totaling 142,641 GRT, seized by the United States Coast Guard under the authority of Public Law 101, (Note: Public Law 101, Acquisition of Domestic or Foreign Merchant Vessels.) 77th Congress and Executive Order 8771, 6 June 1941. Most of the Danish ships were delivered to the War Shipping Administration (WSA), registered in Panama for diplomatic reasons, and operated under new names by commercial companies as WSA agents.

Australian Reefer was delivered to the War Shipping Administration at New York 12 July 1941 for operation by its agent, United States Lines, under an Army Transportation Corps agreement between New York and Australia and New Zealand until 5 February 1942.

After voyage repairs she was transferred to the Navy on a bareboat charter basis on 11 May 1942 and commissioned as Pontiac (AF-20), 12 May 1942. Following conversion and shakedown, Pontiac, assigned to Service Force, Atlantic, departed Norfolk, Virginia, 15 June 1942 on her first Argentia run. On 15 July she completed that run at Boston, Massachusetts, whence she continued to carry supplies to the Maritime Provinces and Newfoundland through 1943. Between late January and May 1944 she conducted sugar runs between Norfolk and Trinidad, Guantánamo Bay and San Juan, then returned to Boston to resume runs to Argentia and, in June, to Iceland.

She completed a quick run to Bermuda in early August, then returned to the Boston-Argentia route before undertaking her last Caribbean run from New York 7 September. On 25 September she arrived at Norfolk from San Juan, made a trip to Bermuda and on 16 November returned to Boston to resume carrying stores to Nova Scotia and Newfoundland. For the next two months she alternated voyages to Argentia with runs to Bermuda and on 29 January 1945 departed Boston for her last run to Canada.

On 30 January 1945 in heavy seas off Halifax the ship's hull was damaged by a loose paravane. She began taking water in her forward compartments and sank off McNabs Island in 40 ft (12.2 m) of water. The tug Foundation Franklin, out of Halifax, took her in tow and subsequently beached the vessel on Maughers Beach, McNabs Island at coordinates 44°36′40″N 63°32′2″W. Raised on 17 February, she was towed to Halifax for temporary repairs.

The Navy's Bureau of Ships noted in a review that the cargo space lacked bulkheads with only a half-height one between number one and two cargo hatches and none aft between the engine room bulkhead and afterpeak. The near loss — and actual total constructive loss — of the ship due to damage from relatively small holes in the hull confirmed estimation that the ship would sink in event of any uncontrolled flooding either forward or aft.

On 14 March she arrived at Norfolk, where she decommissioned 20 May 1945. The Navy had removed deck machinery, stripped main and auxiliary engines of usable parts and removed items such as the laundry. To decrease draft and improve stability the topside areas had been stripped of movable items. Pontiac was returned to the Maritime Commission on the 21st and was struck from the Navy List 2 June 1945. For compensation, $1,374,255.86 were paid to her former Danish owner on 12 July 1945. The ship itself was sold for scrapping for $33,669.00 to the Patapsco Scrap Corporporation on 7 May 1945.

== See also ==
- USAT Sicilien
- MS Tunis (1935)

== Bibliography ==
- "Foreign Passenger and Cargo Ships Taken Over by U.S Maritime Commission during World War II". American Merchant Marine at War (USMM.org). 21 March 2011.
- Lloyds. "Lloyd's Register 1937-38" (PDF). Lloyd's Register.
- Lloyds. "Lloyd's Register 1940-41" (PDF). Lloyd's Register.
- Naval History And Heritage Command (August 24, 2015). "Pontiac IV (AF-20)". Dictionary of American Naval Fighting Ships. Naval History And Heritage Command.
- Maritime Administration. "PONTIAC (AF-20)". Ship History Database Vessel Status Card. U.S. Department of Transportation, Maritime Administration.
- Marcussen, Jørgen (2021). "Detaljerede oplysninger om skibet: Australian Reefer (Detailed information about the ship: Australian Reefer)". Maritim Og Historisk Information (Maritime and Historical Information).
- "Pontiac - 1945". Halifax, Nova Scotia, Canada: Maritime Museum of the Atlantic (MMA), Marine Heritage Database. 10 May 2007.
- Roberts, Stephen S. (15 September 2001). "Class: PONTIAC (AF-20)". ShipScribe.
