= Farrel Corporation =

American rubber and plastic manufacturing company

- Farrel Pomini, Ansonia, Connecticut
- Company type: Private
- Industry: Rubber, Plastics
- Founded: 1848; 178 years ago
- Founder: Almon Farrel
- Headquarters: Ansonia, Connecticut, United States
- Area served: United States
- Products: Polymer production machines
- Number of employees: 100 (2007)
- Website: www.farrel.com

The Farrel Corporation is an American manufacturing company based in Ansonia, Connecticut. Today, they manufacture process equipment for the plastics industry, and employ roughly 100 people.

== History ==
Farrel was founded in 1848 as a foundry by Almon Farrel. During the American Civil War, they produced bayonets and cannon barrels. In 1926, Farrel Foundry merged with Birmingham Iron Foundry of Derby, Connecticut. During the 1920s, Farrel-Birmingham began creating gears for use in US Navy propulsion systems in Buffalo, New York. In 1941, the Navy contracted with Farrel-Birmingham and General Motors to begin manufacturing a rapid reversal gear system that would allow vessels to reverse engines without first slowing down. In 1942, Farrel-Birmingham received the E award from the Navy for their efforts.

In 1963, Farrel Birmingham adopted the current name of Farrel Corporation and began manufacturing process equipment for plastic plants. During the 1970s and 1980s, Farrel went through several owners. In 1986, a group of private equity investors including Rolf Liebergesell, Charles S. Jones and Alberto Shaio, acquired the company from Emhart Corporation (which later merged with Black & Decker) for $1.0 million plus assumption of debt. At the CEO’s direction, Charles S. Jones’s firm divested the Roll Grinder products division, the Railroad products division, the steel extrusion division, and a 25% equity stake in the Italian Pomini enterprise. The Railroad products division was acquired by Simmons Machine Tool Corporation (now NSH USA Corporation) in Albany, New York. Then, Farrel, under Liebergesell’s direction, focused exclusively on its core operations of plastic and rubber equipment. By 1991, under the leadership of Al Shaio, head of sales, revenue doubled to $105 million, with $5.4 million in operating income.

In 1992, Charles S. Jones led Farrel’s IPO on NASDAQ, underwritten by Paine Webber and First Albany for a pre-money valuation of $52.1 million, giving the original investors a 52.1x return in less than six years, with an IRR of 92.1%. Following the acquisition, Charles S. Jones led the acquisition of Farrel’s major competitors, including Rockstedt OHG in Germany, Francis Shaw Rubber Machinery Ltd. and PRC Fabrications Ltd in the United Kingdom and Skinner Engine in Erie, Pennsylvania.

In 2009, Farrel was acquired by the HF Machinery Group division of L. Possehl & Co., of Lübeck, Germany.

In 2016, Farrel built a new facility in Ansonia.
