= USS Success (AM-310) =

Minesweeper of the United States Navy

History

United States
- Name: USS Success (AM-310)
- Builder: Associated Shipbuilders, Seattle
- Laid down: 18 February 1944
- Launched: 11 May 1944
- Sponsored by: Mrs. J. L. McLean
- Commissioned: 18 October 1944
- Decommissioned: 9 July 1946
- Reclassified: MSF-310, 7 February 1955
- Stricken: 1 May 1962
- Fate: Transferred to Mexican Navy, 1963

History

Mexico
- Name: ARM DM-08
- Acquired: 1963
- Fate: unknown

General characteristics
- Class & type: Admirable-class minesweeper
- Displacement: 650 long tons (660 t)
- Length: 184 ft 6 in (56.24 m)
- Beam: 33 ft (10 m)
- Draft: 9 ft 9 in (2.97 m)
- Propulsion: 2 × Cooper Bessemer GSB-8 diesel engines, 1,710 shp (1,280 kW); National Supply Co. single reduction gear; 2 shafts
- Speed: 15 knots (28 km/h)
- Complement: 104
- Armament: 1 × 3"/50 caliber (76 mm) DP gun; 2 × twin Bofors 40 mm guns; 1 × Hedgehog anti-submarine mortar; 2 × Depth charge tracks

Service record
- Part of: U.S. Pacific Fleet (1944-1946); Atlantic Reserve Fleet (1946–1962); Mexican Navy (from 1963)
- Operations: Battle of Iwo Jima; Battle of Okinawa
- Awards: 4 Battle stars

USS Success (AM-310) was an Admirable-class minesweeper built for the United States Navy during World War II. She was awarded four battle stars for service in the Pacific during World War II. She was decommissioned in July 1946 and placed in reserve. While she remained in reserve, Success was reclassified as MSF-310 in February 1955 but never reactivated. In October 1962, she was sold to the Mexican Navy and renamed ARM DM-08. Although she is reported out of service, her ultimate fate is not reported in secondary sources.

== U.S. Navy career ==
Success was laid down on 18 February 1944 by Associated Shipbuilders, Seattle, Washington; launched on 11 May 1944; sponsored by Mrs. J. L. McLean; and commissioned on 18 October 1944. Success completed fitting out at Seattle, Washington, and sailed for San Pedro, California, on 8 November where she held her shakedown cruise in the harbor of Los Angeles, California. On 11 December, the minesweeper got underway for Hawaii and arrived at Pearl Harbor on 19 December 1944.

She sortied with Task Group (TG) 51, LST Flotilla One, in the screen of Tractor Group Able for Ulithi on 22 January 1945. The group remained there from 3 to 5 February and then steamed to the Mariana Islands where final staging was begun for the invasion of Iwo Jima.

Success was detached from the screen to join Mine Division (MinDiv) 36 which sailed for Iwo Jima on the 13th. The division arrived off the island three days before the assault was to begin and started sweeping mines. Success operated as a minesweeper and performed antisubmarine patrols there from 16 to 25 February when she departed for Saipan. She sailed from there on 7 March and arrived at Ulithi the next day. MinDiv 36, and Success stood out of Ulithi on 19 March, for the Ryukyu Islands. On the 25th, they began sweeping mines in the Kerama Retto area in preparation for the U.S. Army landings there the next day.

Success then began clearing the Okinawa area for the impending assault upon that Japanese stronghold. After the landings there on 1 April, the minesweeper also performed antiaircraft and antisubmarine patrols. Five days later, the Japanese launched their heaviest attack by suicide planes against American ships at Okinawa. SS Hobbs Victory was crashed by a suicide plane and Success picked up 78 survivors. On 15 April, she splashed a "Tony" during an air raid. The ship and her division departed the operating area on 5 May for Ulithi and arrived on the 9th.

The minesweeper was assigned to the screen of a resupply convoy bound for Okinawa which arrived there on 27 May. Success patrolled off Okinawa until 12 June. From the 13th to the 20th, she swept mines in the East China Sea. After a brief logistics period at Kerama Retto, she swept mines between Formosa and the coast of China from 4 to 15 July. From the 22nd to the 30th, she again swept the East China Sea. On 13 August, she and Superior departed Okinawa to sweep an area near Kyūshū, from the 14th to the 24th before returning to port. She sailed on 30 August for the southwest coast of Korea and swept mines there until 7 September. Two days later she was assigned to the U.S. 5th Fleet and swept the approaches to Sasebo, Japan, which became her base of operations. She cleared mines around the islands there, and then swept known minefields from Kyūshū to Korea until early December.

Success returned to Sasebo on 5 December and waited for further orders. She was notified that she would return to the United States, via Eniwetok and Pearl Harbor. The sweeper sailed on 10 December 1945 and arrived at San Diego, California, on 12 January 1946. She was routed from there to the East Coast and arrived at Galveston, Texas, on 3 February for pre-inactivation availability.

Success moved to Orange, Texas, where she was decommissioned on 9 July 1946. Success received four battle stars for World War II. While she remained in reserve, Success's designation was changed to MSF-310 on 7 February 1955. Success was struck from the Naval Vessel Register on 1 May 1962 and sold to Mexico in 1963.

== Mexican Navy career ==
The former Success was acquired by the Mexican Navy in 1963 and renamed ARM DM-08. Although she is reported out of service, her ultimate fate is not reported in secondary sources.
