= USS Fancy =

Minesweeper of the United States Navy

History

United States
- Name: USS Fancy (AM-234)
- Builder: Puget Sound Bridge and Dredging Company, Seattle, Washington
- Laid down: 12 May 1944
- Launched: 4 September 1944
- Sponsored by: Mrs. E. L. Skeel
- Commissioned: 13 December 1944
- Decommissioned: 21 May 1945
- Fate: Transferred to the Soviet Union, 21 May 1945
- Reclassified: MSF-234, 7 February 1955
- Stricken: 1 January 1983

History

Soviet Union
- Name: T-272
- Acquired: 21 May 1945
- Commissioned: 21 May 1945
- Refit: Converted to naval trawler, 1948
- Renamed: Vyuga, 1948
- Fate: Scrapped 1960

General characteristics
- Class & type: Admirable-class minesweeper
- Displacement: 650 tons
- Length: 184 ft 6 in (56.24 m)
- Beam: 33 ft (10 m)
- Draft: 9 ft 9 in (2.97 m)
- Propulsion: 2 × ALCO 539 diesel engines, 1,710 shp (1.3 MW); Farrel-Birmingham single reduction gear; 2 shafts
- Speed: 14.8 knots (27.4 km/h)
- Complement: 104
- Armament: 1 × 3"/50 caliber gun DP; 2 × twin Bofors 40 mm guns; 1 × Hedgehog anti-submarine mortar; 2 × depth charge tracks

USS Fancy (AM-234) was an Admirable-class minesweeper built for the United States Navy during World War II and in commission from 1944 to 1945. In 1945, she was transferred to the Soviet Union and served in the Soviet Navy after that as T-272 and Vyuga.

== Construction and commissioning ==
Fancy was launched on 4 September 1944 at Seattle, , Washington by the Puget Sound Bridge and Dredging Company, sponsored by Mrs. E. L. Skeel, and was commissioned on 13 December 1944.

== Service history ==
=== U.S. Navy, World War II, 1944-1945 ===
Following shakedown and antisubmarine training, Fancy departed Seattle for Pearl Harbor, Territory of Hawaii, on 15 February 1945. Selected for transfer to the Soviet Navy in Project Hula – a secret program for the transfer of U.S. Navy ships to the Soviet Navy at Cold Bay, Territory of Alaska, in anticipation of the Soviet Union joining the war against Japan – Fancy, in company with three other ships earmarked for Project Hula – her sister ship USS Rampart (AM-282) and the auxiliary motor minesweepers USS YMS-38 and USS YMS-237 – departed Pearl Harbor on 7 March 1945 and steamed back to Seattle, arriving there on 19 March 1945. She then proceeded to Kodiak, Alaska, and then to Cold Bay to begin familiarization training of her new Soviet crew.

=== Soviet Navy, 1945-1960 ===
Following the completion of training for her Soviet crew, Fancy was decommissioned on 21 May 1945 at Cold Bay and transferred to the Soviet Union under Lend-Lease immediately. Also commissioned into the Soviet Navy immediately, she was designated as a tralshik ("minesweeper") and renamed T-272 in Soviet service. She soon departed Cold Bay bound for Petropavlovsk-Kamchatsky in the Soviet Union, where she served in the Soviet Far East. The Soviets converted her into a naval trawler in 1948 and renamed her Vyuga.

In February 1946, the United States began negotiations for the return of ships loaned to the Soviet Union for use during World War II, and on 8 May 1947, United States Secretary of the Navy James V. Forrestal informed the United States Department of State that the United States Department of the Navy wanted 480 of the 585 combatant ships it had transferred to the Soviet Union for World War II use returned. Deteriorating relations between the two countries as the Cold War broke out led to protracted negotiations over the ships, and by the mid-1950s the U.S. Navy found it too expensive to bring home ships that had become worthless to it anyway. Many ex-American ships were merely administratively "returned" to the United States and instead sold for scrap in the Soviet Union, while the U.S. Navy did not seriously pursue the return of others because it viewed them as no longer worth the cost of recovery. The Soviet Union never returned Fancy to the United States, although the U.S. Navy reclassified her as a "fleet minesweeper" (MSF) and redesignated her MSF-234 on 7 February 1955.

T-272 was scrapped in 1960. Unaware of the ship's fate, the U.S. Navy retained Fancy on its Naval Vessel Register until her name was stricken on 1 January 1983.
