= USS Bond (AM-152) =

Minesweeper of the United States Navy

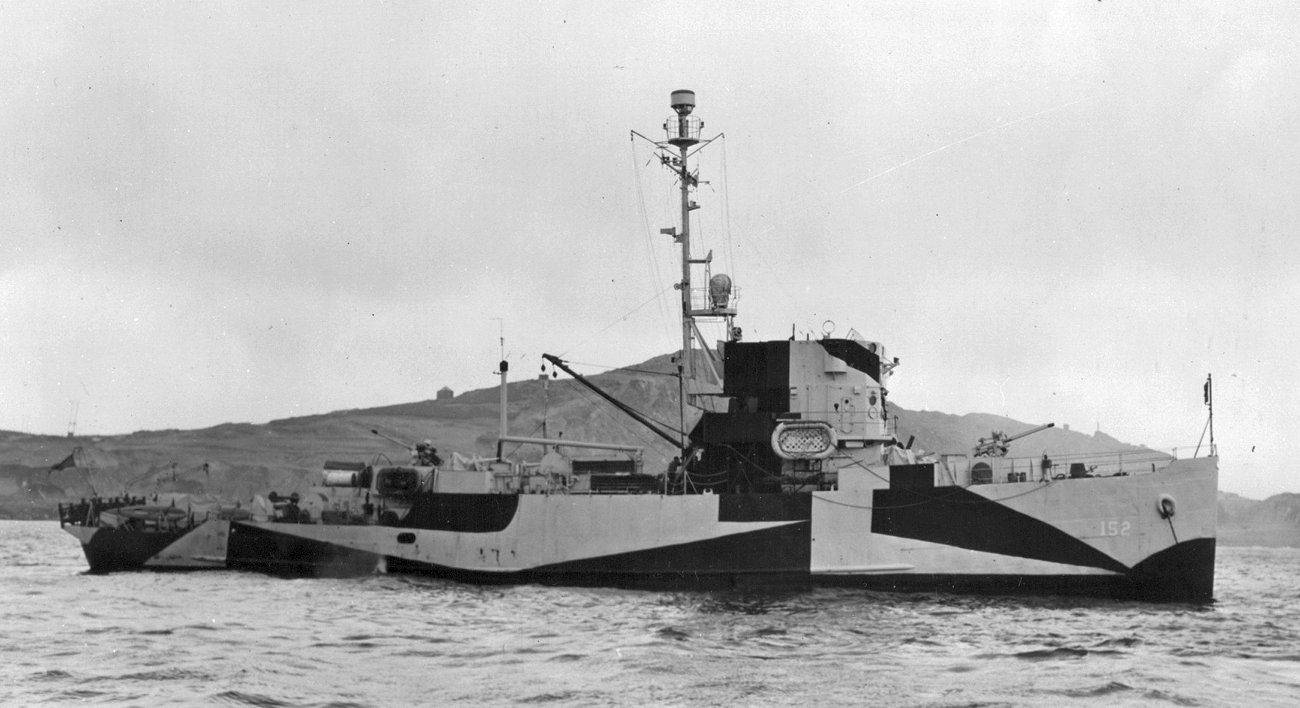
- Bond seen in June 1944

History

United States
- Name: USS Bond (AMc-129)
- Builder: Willamette Iron and Steel Works, Portland, Oregon
- Reclassified: AM-152, 21 February 1942
- Laid down: 11 April 1942
- Launched: 21 October 1942
- Commissioned: 30 August 1943
- Decommissioned: 17 August 1945
- Fate: Transferred to Soviet Navy, 17 August 1945
- Reclassified: MSF-152, 7 February 1955
- Stricken: 1 January 1983

History

Soviet Union
- Name: T-285
- Acquired: 17 August 1945
- Commissioned: 17 August 1945
- Renamed: BRN-37, 11 July 1956
- Reclassified: Auxiliary vessel (BRN), 11 July 1956
- Decommissioned: 18 January 1960
- Fate: Scrapped 1960

General characteristics
- Class & type: Admirable-class minesweeper
- Displacement: 650 tons
- Length: 184 ft 6 in (56.24 m)
- Beam: 33 ft (10 m)
- Draft: 9 ft 9 in (2.97 m)
- Propulsion: 2 × ALCO 539 diesel engines, 1,710 shp (1.3 MW); Farrel-Birmingham single reduction gear; 2 shafts
- Speed: 14.8 knots (27.4 km/h)
- Complement: 104
- Armament: 1 × 3"/50 caliber gun DP; 2 × twin Bofors 40 mm guns; 1 × Hedgehog anti-submarine mortar; 2 × depth charge tracks

Service record
- Part of: U.S. Pacific Fleet (1943–1945); Soviet Pacific Ocean Fleet (1945–1960)

USS Bond (AM-152) was an Admirable-class minesweeper built for the United States Navy during World War II and in commission from 1943 to 1945. In 1945, she was transferred to the Soviet Union and served after that in the Soviet Navy as T-285 and as BRN-37.

== Construction and commissioning ==
originally classified as a "coastal minesweeper," AMc-129, Bond was reclassified as a "minesweeper," AM-152, on 21 February 1942. She was laid down on 11 April 1942 at Portland, Oregon, by the Willamette Iron and Steel Works, launched on 21 October 1942, and commissioned on 30 August 1943.

== Service history ==
=== U.S. Navy, World War II, 1943–1945 ===
Following shakedown training, Bond engaged in patrols out of San Pedro, California, from 2 October to 20 November 1943. On the latter day, she got underway for the Hawaiian Islands and arrived at Pearl Harbor, Territory of Hawaii, on 30 November 1943. She remained there until 7 December 1943, when she shaped a course for the Territory of Alaska. She arrived at Adak in the Aleutian Islands on 13 December 1943 and began patrols and escort duty. Over the next six months, her assignment took her to Attu, Kiska, Dutch Harbor, and Amchitka as well as Adak.

Bond departed Dutch Harbor for San Francisco, California, early in the summer of 1944. Following repairs at San Francisco, Bond put to sea on 8 August 1944, bound for the Mariana Islands. She made stops at Pearl Harbor and at Eniwetok Atoll in the Marshall Islands before arriving at Saipan in the Mariana Islands on 2 September 1944. For the next seven months, Bond patrolled in the vicinity of Saipan and escorted convoys between Saipan, Ulithi, Guam, and Eniwetok. She left Saipan on 25 April 1945 and, after steaming via Eniwetok and Pearl Harbor, arrived at Portland, Oregon, on 22 May 1945.

Selected for transfer to the Soviet Navy in Project Hula – a secret program for the transfer of U.S. Navy ships to the Soviet Navy at Cold Bay, Alaska, in anticipation of the Soviet Union joining the war against Japan – Bond underwent pre-transfer repairs at Portland and at Seattle, Washington, before moving north to Cold Bay in the summer of 1945 to begin familiarization training for her new Soviet crew.

=== Soviet Navy, 1945–1960 ===
Following the completion of training for her Soviet crew, Bond was decommissioned on 17 August 1945 at Cold Bay and transferred to the Soviet Union under Lend-Lease immediately. Also commissioned into the Soviet Navy immediately, she was designated as a tralshik ("minesweeper") and renamed T-285 in Soviet service. She soon departed Cold Bay bound for Petropavlovsk-Kamchatsky in the Soviet Union, where she served in the Soviet Far East.

In February 1946, the United States began negotiations for the return of ships loaned to the Soviet Union for use during World War II, and on 8 May 1947, United States Secretary of the Navy James V. Forrestal informed the United States Department of State that the United States Department of the Navy wanted 480 of the 585 combatant ships it had transferred to the Soviet Union for World War II use returned. Deteriorating relations between the two countries as the Cold War broke out led to protracted negotiations over the ships, and by the mid-1950s the U.S. Navy found it too expensive to bring home ships that had become worthless to it anyway. Many ex-American ships were merely administratively "returned" to the United States and instead sold for scrap in the Soviet Union, while the U.S. Navy did not seriously pursue the return of others because it viewed them as no longer worth the cost of recovery. The Soviet Union never returned Bond to the United States, although the U.S. Navy reclassified her as a "fleet minesweeper" (MSF) and redesignated her MSF-152 on 7 February 1955. The Soviet Navy, meanwhile, reclassified the ship as an "auxiliary vessel" (BRN) on 11 July 1956 and renamed her BRN-37 the same day.

== Disposal ==
The Soviet Navy decommissioned BRN-37 18 January 1960 and sold her for scrapping that year. Unaware of her fate, the U.S. Navy kept Bond on its Naval Vessel Register until finally striking her on 1 January 1983.
