= Fixity =

Fixity may refer to:

- MV Fixity, an Empire F type coaster in service with F T Everard & Sons 1946–61.
- USS Fixity (AM-235), an Admiral Class minesweeper.
- File fixity, a digital preservation term referring to the property of a digital file being fixed, or unchanged.
- Precedence and associativity of operators in computer programming languages; see Order of operations
