= USS Creddock =

Minesweeper of the United States Navy

History

United States
- Name: USS PCE-916
- Builder: Willamette Iron and Steel Works
- Laid down: 10 November 1943
- Renamed: USS Creddock (AM-356)
- Launched: 22 July 1944
- Commissioned: 18 December 1945
- Decommissioned: 26 March 1946
- Reclassified: MSF-356, 7 February 1955
- Fate: Transferred to Myanmar, 1967

History

Myanmar
- Name: UMS Yan Gyi Aung (M42)
- Acquired: 1967
- Status: in active service

Service record
- Part of: U.S. Pacific Fleet (1944–1946); Burmese/Myanmar Navy (from 1967)

General characteristics
- Class & type: PCE-905-class patrol craft
- Class & type: Admirable-class minesweeper, September 1943
- Displacement: 650 long tons (660 t)
- Length: 184 ft 6 in (56.24 m)
- Beam: 33 ft (10 m)
- Draft: 9 ft 9 in (2.97 m)
- Propulsion: 2 × ALCO 539 diesel engines, 1,710 shp (1,280 kW); Farrel-Birmingham single reduction gear; 2 shafts
- Speed: 15 knots (28 km/h)
- Complement: 104
- Armament: 1 × 3"/50 caliber (76 mm) DP gun; 2 × twin Bofors 40 mm guns; 1 × Hedgehog anti-submarine mortar; 2 × Depth charge tracks

USS Creddock (AM-356) was an Admirable-class minesweeper built for the United States Navy during World War II. The ship was ordered and laid down as PCE-905-class patrol craft USS PCE-916 but was renamed and reclassified before her July 1944 launch as Creddock (AM-356). Creddock was launched 22 July 1944 by Willamette Iron and Steel Works, Portland, Oregon; sponsored by Miss N. I. Schmidleys; and commissioned 18 December 1945. Creddock departed Astoria, Oregon, 6 January 1946 and arrived at San Diego, California, 4 days later. There she was placed out of commission in reserve 26 March 1946. Creddock was reclassified MSF-356 on 7 February 1955.

In 1967, Creddock was transferred to the Burmese Navy (later, the Myanmar Navy), where she is classed as a patrol corvette under the name UMS Yan Gyi Aung (M42); she is in active service.
