= USS Harrier =

Minesweeper of the United States Navy

History

United States
- Name: USS Harrier
- Builder: Willamette Iron and Steel Works
- Laid down: 11 August 1943
- Launched: 7 June 1944
- Commissioned: 31 August 1945
- Decommissioned: 28 March 1946
- Stricken: 1 December 1959
- Fate: Sold 1964

General characteristics
- Class & type: Admirable-class minesweeper
- Displacement: 945 tons
- Length: 184 ft 6 in (56.24 m)
- Beam: 33 ft (10 m)
- Draft: 9 ft 9 in (2.97 m)
- Installed power: 1,710 shp
- Propulsion: 2 × Busch Sulzer 539 diesel engines, 855 shp each; Farrel-Birmingham single reduction gear; 2 shafts
- Speed: 14.8 knots (27.4 km/h)
- Complement: 104
- Armament: 1 × 3"/50 caliber gun DP; 2 × twin Bofors 40 mm guns; 6 × Oerlikon 20 mm cannon; 1 × Hedgehog anti-submarine mortar; 4 × Depth charge projectors (K-guns); 2 × depth charge racks

Service record
- Part of: US Pacific Fleet (1945-1946); Atlantic Reserve Fleet (1946-1959)

USS Harrier (AM-366) was an Admirable-class minesweeper built for the United States Navy. Laid down on 11 August 1943 by the Willamette Iron and Steel Works, Portland, Oregon, launched 7 June 1944, commissioned as USS Harrier (AM-366), 31 October 1945.

== History ==
After shakedown and exercises along the Oregon coast, Harrier put into San Diego, California, 5 January 1946. She decommissioned, 28 March 1946 at San Diego, California. Struck from the Naval Register, 1 December 1959. Transferred to the Maritime Commission, sold in 1964 and was renamed Sea Scope. The ship was reclassified for oceanographic research and was equipped with a variety of underwater tools including sonar, photographic equipment, magnetic and seabed exploration equipment. It is reported to have been used, circa 1970, to reconnoiter the site of the Soviet K-129 sub prior to the CIA project Azorian/Glomar Explorer to recover part of that sub in 1974. It was renamed Atlantic Coast in 1998.
