= Willamette Iron and Steel Works =

Defunct company in Portland, Oregon, U.S.

Coordinates: 45.54387°N 122.69674°W

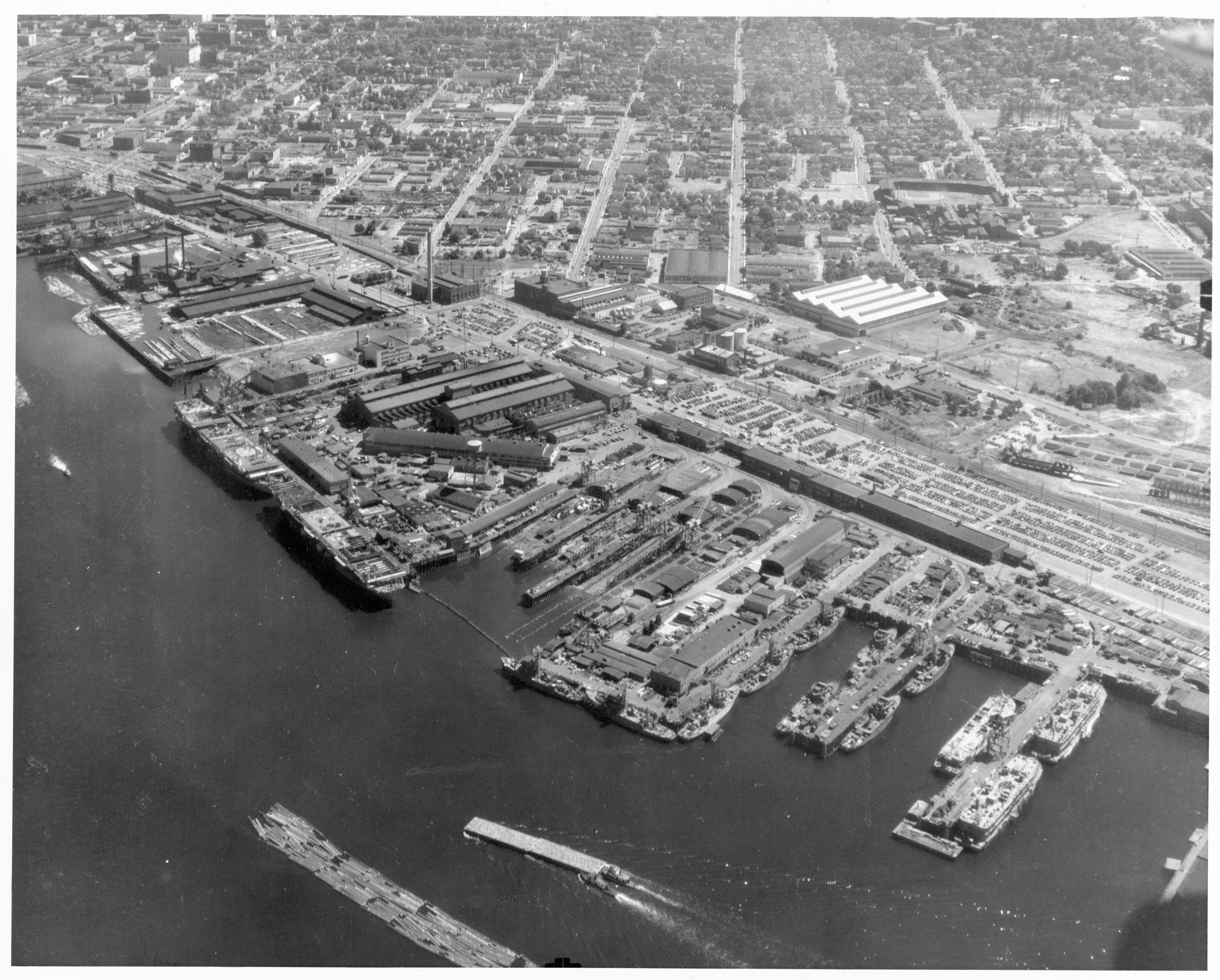
The yard in 1945

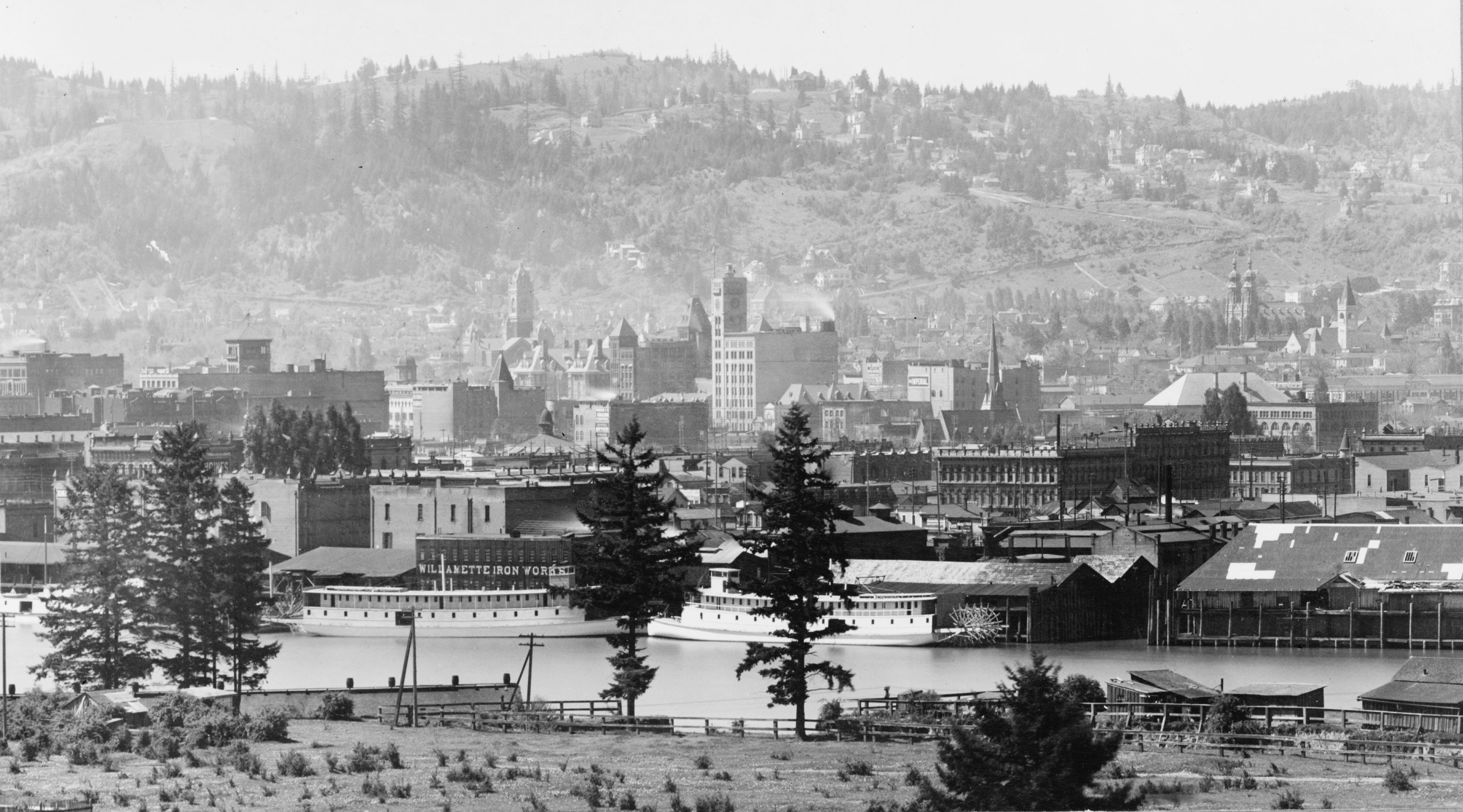
Newly constructed sternwheelers fitting out at Willamette Iron Works in 1898

Willamette Iron Works (also known as Willamette Iron and Steel Company or WISCO) was a general foundry and machine business established in 1865 in Portland, Oregon, originally specializing in the manufacture of steamboat boilers and engines. In 1904, the company changed its name to Willamette Iron and Steel Works, under which name it operated continually until its close in 1990.

== History ==
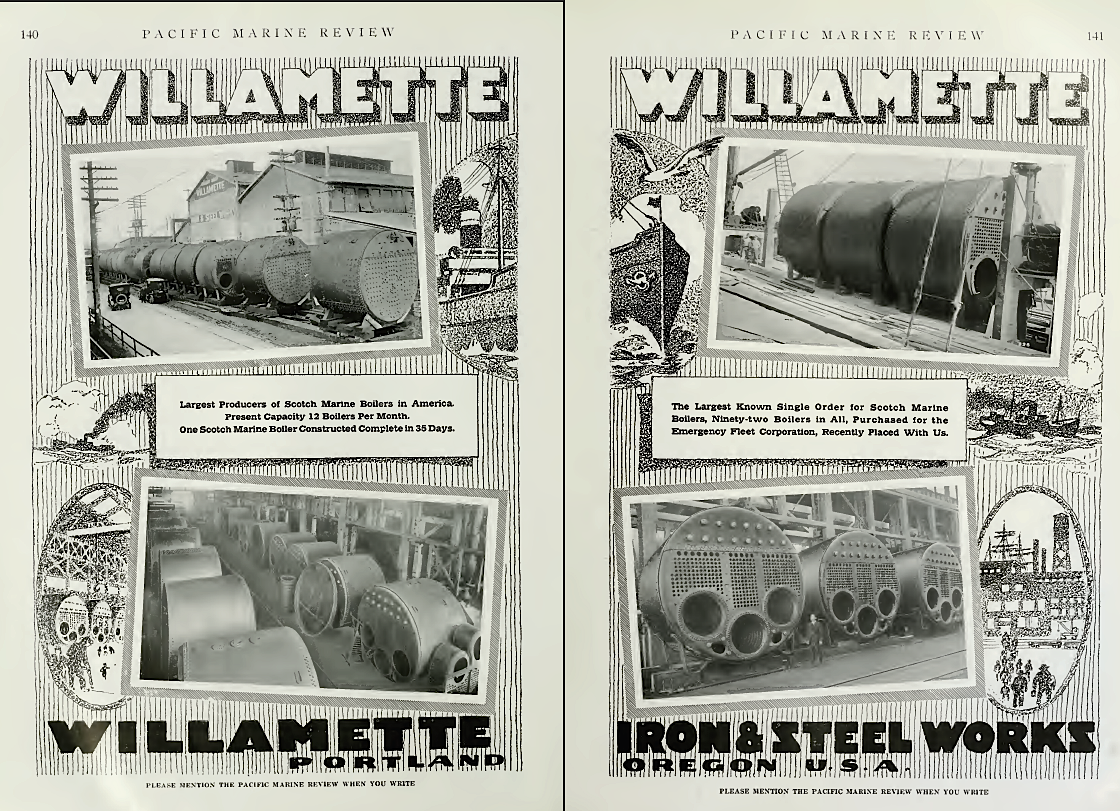
Advertisement noting large Emergency Fleet Corporation boiler orders

The company made fire hydrants for the city of Portland in the late 19th century.

During the World War I shipbuilding boom, Willamette Iron and Steel Works built boilers for Northwest Steel and Albina Engine & Machine Works in Portland; G. M. Standifer Construction in Vancouver; Union Iron Works, (Note: Pacific Marine Review, like many other sources, is usually not specific about whether the San Francisco plant or the Alameda plant of Union Iron Works is meant. In the context here it probably refers to the Alameda plant, where merchant ships were produced) Schaw-Batcher, and the Moore Dry Dock Company in San Francisco; Southwestern Shipbuilding and the Long Beach Shipbuilding Company in Los Angeles; Skinner & Eddy, J. F. Duthie, and Ames in Seattle; and Todd Construction in Tacoma, as well as completely fitting out ships launched by Northwest Steel.

Between the wars, the shipyard concentrated on building small commercial vessels. During the 1920s, the company manufactured a geared steam locomotive known as the "Willamette", a Shay-type locomotive for use in logging operations in Washington and Oregon. Between 1901 and 1931 Willamette built over 2500 steam donkeys for use in the logging industry.

During World War II, Willamette Iron & Steel was itself in the shipbuilding business, producing small naval auxiliaries, minesweepers, patrol craft, submarine chasers, and non-self-propelled lighters. These were built through WISCO's relationship with industrialist Henry Kaiser. The company built more than 70 ships during World War II, but they were smaller than those built by the three nearby Kaiser Shipyards. The ships were built on contract to the US and British governments. Willamette also built triple expansion main propulsion engines for Liberty ships.

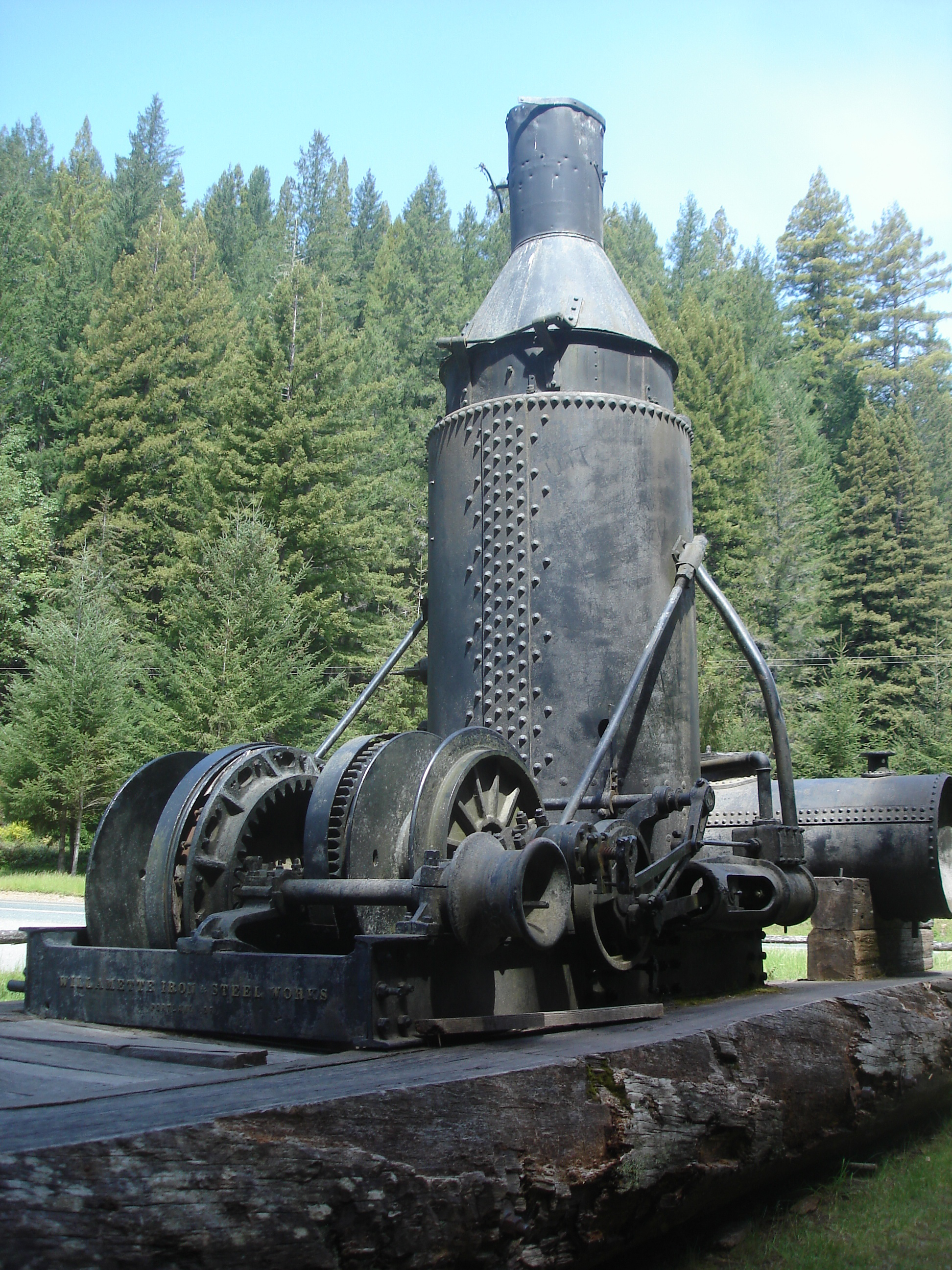
A Willamette steam donkey

During World War II, Willamette also assembled over 800 Russian gauge Baldwin steam locomotives and shipped them to Vladivostok. NW Front Ave. in Portland had a short distance of Russian gauge track for the engines to move from the engine house on the west side of Front to the loading dock on the east side of the street. These were shipped across the Pacific on USSR flagged ships, since the USSR and the Empire of Japan were not at war. A Porter 0-6-0 was bought from the US Government in Panama to switch the broad gauge track.

In 1945, after World War II ended, Willamette Iron and Steel continued as mostly a ship repair facility. In the early 1970s, the company manufactured the first three turbine units for the third powerhouse to be built at the Grand Coulee Dam. Over the years, business dropped as larger shipyards grew, and Willamette finally closed in 1990.

== World War II Ships ==
- 23 of 123 Admirable-class minesweepers
  - Bond (AM-152) ... Counsel (AM-165)
  - Creddock (AM-356), Dipper (AM-357), Drake (AM-359)
  - Dunlin (AM-361) ... Harrier (AM-366)
- 14 of 68 PCE-842-class patrol crafts
  - PCE-891 ... PCE-904
- 9 lighters: YFN-743 ... YFN-751
- 6 barracks barges: APL-41 ... APL-46
- 8 to 10 of 45 Bogue-class escort carriers (completion of Todd Tacoma hull)
  - Tracker (D24) (disagrees:)
  - Trumpeter (D09) (disagrees:)
  - Searcher (D40) (AVG-22)
  - Ravager (D70) (AVG-24)
  - Chatham (CVE-32), Delgada (CVE-40), Prince (CVE-45)
  - St. Joseph (CVE-50), St. Simon (CVE-51), Vermillion (CVE-52)
- 1 of 19 Commencement Bay-class escort carriers (completion of Todd Tacoma hull)
  - Kula Gulf (CVE-108)
- 3 of 30 Andromeda-class attack cargo ships (conversion of Moore Dry Dock Company hull)
  - Algol (AKA-54), Arneb (AKA-56), Capricornus (AKA-57)
- conversion of
  - USS Neville, USS Heywood, USS President Jackson to troop transports
