= USS Signet =

Minesweeper of the United States Navy

History

United States
- Name: USS Signet (AM-302)
- Builder: Associated Shipbuilders, Seattle, Washington
- Laid down: 8 April 1943
- Launched: 16 August 1943
- Commissioned: 20 June 1944
- Decommissioned: December 1945
- Reclassified: MSF-302, 7 February 1955
- Stricken: 1 January 1965
- Fate: Transferred to Dominican Republic, 13 January 1965

History

Dominican Republic
- Name: Tortuguero (BM455)
- Acquired: 13 January 1965
- Reclassified: C455, 1995
- Stricken: 1997
- Fate: hulked, 1997

General characteristics
- Class & type: Admirable-class minesweeper
- Displacement: 650 tons
- Length: 184 ft 6 in (56.24 m)
- Beam: 33 ft (10 m)
- Draft: 9 ft 9 in (2.97 m)
- Propulsion: 2 × ALCO 539 diesel engines, 1,710 shp (1.3 MW); Farrel-Birmingham single reduction gear; 2 shafts
- Speed: 14.8 knots (27.4 km/h)
- Complement: 104
- Armament: 1 × 3"/50 caliber gun; 2 × twin Bofors 40 mm gun; 1 × Hedgehog anti-submarine mortar; 2 × Depth charge tracks

Service record
- Part of: US Pacific Fleet (1944-1945); Atlantic Reserve Fleet (1945-1965); Dominican Navy (1965-1997)
- Operations: Battle of Iwo Jima; Battle of Okinawa
- Awards: 4 Battle stars

USS Signet (AM-302) was an Admirable-class minesweeper built for the United States Navy during World War II. She received four battle stars during World War II. She was decommissioned in December 1945 and placed in reserve. In February 1955, while still in reserve, her hull number was changed from AM-302 to MSF-302, but she was not reactivated. She was transferred to the Dominican Republic in January 1965 and renamed Tortuguero (BM455) (or Tortugero in some sources). She was employed as a patrol vessel in Dominican Navy service. Her pennant number was changed from BM455 to C455 in 1995. Tortuguero was stricken and hulked in 1997.

== U.S. Navy service ==
Signet was laid down on 8 April 1943 by Associated Shipbuilders at Harbor Island Seattle, Washington, and was launched on 16 August 1943; sponsored by Miss Bernice Moore, and commissioned on 20 June 1944.

Signet spent the summer of 1944 completing her fitting out and undergoing minesweeping trials, shakedown, and antisubmarine warfare training. On 26 August, she reported to the Commander, Western Sea Frontier, at San Francisco, California. That same afternoon, she departed San Francisco escorting SS Eugene Skinner to Honolulu.

Over the next five months, the minesweeper made two voyages from Hawaii to Eniwetok Atoll in the Marshall Islands and one to San Francisco. On all three occasions, she served as escort for supply ships. She visited Kwajalein while returning from her first voyage to the Western Pacific, and Majuro en route back from the second.

Upon her return to Hawaii from San Francisco, California, on 3 December, Signet began a three-week period of availability, followed by patrols and exercises in the islands. On the morning of 22 January 1945, she sortied with the escorts of a convoy of 39 LSTs, LSMs, and LCIs bound for Eniwetok. The convoy arrived on 3 February and, after a day of logistics, Signet got underway for the Marianas en route to the Iwo Jima invasion. Signet saw her charges into Saipan Harbor on the 10th, then joined Sweep Unit 2 at Tinian. She stayed there four days, then sortied with Mine Unit 1 on 13 February headed for Iwo Jima in the Volcano Islands.

Signet arrived off Iwo Jima on 16 February, three days prior to the assault. The minesweeper remained in the vicinity of Iwo Jima until 7 March. During the intervening period, she swept mines and screened the transports, particularly during the nightly retirements from action. Her crew rescued a downed American flier during evening of 21 February and watched the U.S. Marines hoist the colors on the summit of Mount Suribachi on the 23d. On 4 March, Signet's crew began to understand the significance of Iwo Jima as they watched the first crippled B-29 land on its airfield. On 7 March after a little more than three weeks of sweeping, patrolling, and being harassed by enemy planes Signet cleared Iwo Jima for Ulithi Atoll in the Carolines.

The minesweeper was at Ulithi from the 10th to the 19th. There her crew enjoyed rest and relaxation periods alternated with stints of work to prepare for the next operation: Okinawa. Signet sortied from Ulithi on the 19th, with the ships of six sweep units and a gunboat support division. They arrived off Kerama Retto, Okinawa Gunto, on the 25th and immediately began sweeping minefields around that stepping-stone to Okinawa. For the next three months, Signet swept mines, patrolled, screened transports, fought off air attacks, and supported ground troops.

Up until 7 April, her gun crews had to content themselves with watching their sister ships and combat air patrols splash Japanese planes. That evening, however, the minesweeper received a message from USS Staunch (AM-307) indicating the approach of an enemy "Betty." Soon Signet's gunners were able to see the medium bomber's exhaust flames as it approached their ship. At 2033 the port guns opened fire. The plane passed low over the minesweeper and began to flame as the starboard gunners loosed their fusillade. Burning as he went, the Japanese plane splashed into the sea about 1,000 yards from Signet. The wreckage floated and burned for a while as Signet searched fruitlessly for survivors. Soon thereafter, she returned to her patrol station.

On the night of 18 April, Signet supported the stranded crew of an LCVP. Under fire from entrenched Japanese, they requested light from Signet. The minesweeper responded, silencing the Japanese position each time her searchlight exposed them. This continued through most of the night. The stranded men were finally rescued by a tug early on the morning of the 19th.

In early June, she supported the landings at Iheya Shima to the northwest of Okinawa, then returned to minesweeping and anti-suicide boat patrol. She departed Okinawa on 8 July, headed for the Philippines and made Leyte Gulf on the 13th.

She remained in the Philippines through the cessation of hostilities on 15 August and departed Leyte on the 18th. She returned to Okinawa on the 24th and remained there until the 30th when she got underway with a large group of minesweepers to help sweep the Yellow Sea in support of the Korea occupation forces. For the first seven days of September, she made daily sweeps in the Yellow Sea and cleared the area at night.

On 8 September, Signet headed for Japan and, the next morning, began sweeping the approaches to Sasebo. For two months, she swept the area around Sasebo during the day and anchored at Matsu Shima, Kyūshū, at night. From late September until early October, her crew enjoyed liberty in Sasebo. From 11 to 21 October, Signet swept the area around Iki Island and Tsushima Island off the northwestern coast of Kyūshū. Between 26 October and 10 November, Signet conducted operations in the East China Sea southwest of Kyūshū. On her final sweep, 17 November to 5 December, Signet returned to the vicinity of Tsushima.

On 11 December 1945, with her homeward-bound pennant flying, she departed Sasebo. With the other ships of Mine Squadron 12, she steamed out of the harbor, passing in review before Rear Admiral Struble Commander, Minecraft, Pacific Fleet, and receiving the salutes of the assembled ships of the U.S. Pacific Fleet.

Upon her return to the United States later that month Signet was placed out of commission, in reserve, and berthed at Orange, Texas. There she remained for the next 19 years. She was reclassified MSF-302 on 11 February 1955 and declared excess to the needs of the Navy in January 1965. Accordingly, her name was struck from the Navy list on 1 January 1965. Signet was sold to the Dominican Republic on 13 January 1965 under the terms of the Military Assistance Program.

=== Awards ===
Signet earned four battle stars during World War II.

== Dominican Navy service ==
The former Signet was acquired by the Dominican Republic on 13 January 1965 and renamed Tortuguero (BM455). Employed as a patrol vessel in Dominican Navy service, her pennant number was changed to C455 in 1995. Tortuguero was stricken and hulked in 1997.
