= USS Disdain =

Minesweeper of the United States Navy

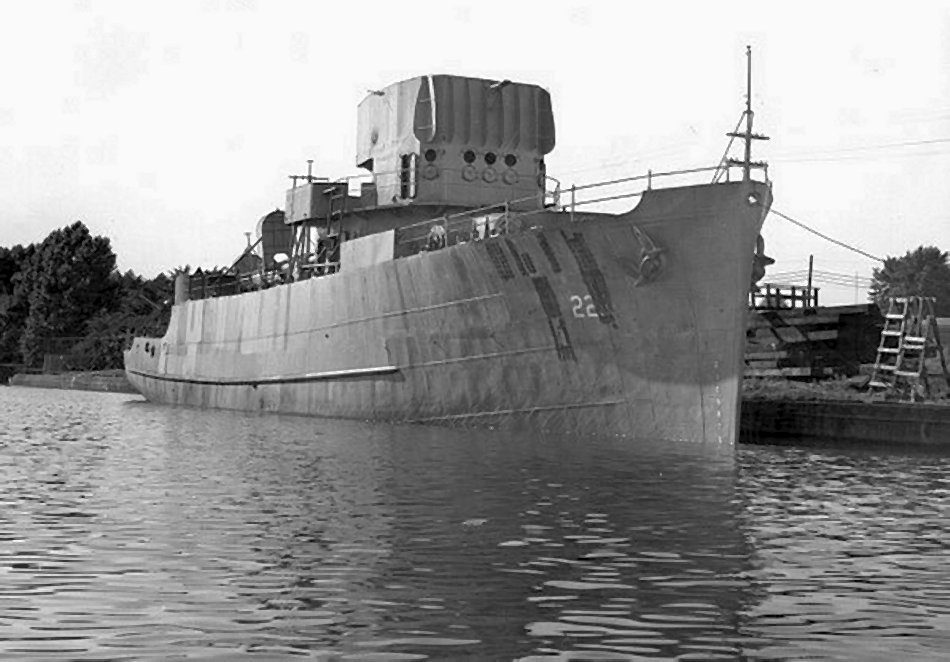
- USS Disdain (AM-222) under construction

History

United States
- Name: USS Disdain (AM-222)
- Builder: American Ship Building Company, Lorain, Ohio
- Laid down: 23 October 1943
- Launched: 25 March 1944
- Commissioned: 26 December 1944
- Decommissioned: 22 May 1945
- Fate: Transferred to Soviet Union, 22 May 1945
- Reclassified: MSF-222, 7 February 1955
- Stricken: 1 January 1983

History

Soviet Union
- Name: T-271
- Acquired: 22 May 1945
- Commissioned: 22 May 1945
- Refit: Converted to naval trawler, 1948
- Fate: See note

General characteristics
- Class & type: Admirable-class minesweeper
- Displacement: 650 tons
- Length: 184 ft 6 in (56.24 m)
- Beam: 33 ft (10 m)
- Draft: 9 ft 9 in (2.97 m)
- Propulsion: 2 × ALCO 539 diesel engines, 1,710 shp (1.3 MW); Farrel-Birmingham single reduction gear; 2 shafts
- Speed: 14.8 knots (27.4 km/h)
- Complement: 104
- Armament: 1 × 3"/50 caliber gun DP; 2 × twin Bofors 40 mm guns; 1 × Hedgehog anti-submarine mortar; 2 × depth charge tracks

Service record
- Part of: U.S. Pacific Fleet (1944-1945); Soviet Pacific Ocean Fleet (1945-1960 or 1964)

USS Disdain (AM-222) was an Admirable-class minesweeper built for the United States Navy during World War II and in commission from 1944 to 1945. She was transferred to the Soviet Union in 1945 and after that served in the Soviet Navy as T-271.

== Construction and commissioning ==
Disdain was launched on 25 March 1944 at Lorain, Ohio, by the American Shipbuilding Company, sponsored by Mrs. J. P. Sturges, and commissioned on 26 December 1944.

== Service history ==
=== U.S. Navy, World War II, 1944-1945 ===
Departing Chicago, Illinois, on 4 January 1945, Disdain made her way down the Mississippi River to New Orleans, Louisiana, arriving there on 31 January 1945 for shakedown training.

She was decommissioned on 21 May and transferred to the Soviet Navy under lend lease as T-277. In 1948, the Soviets converted the ship into a naval trawler and renamed her Shtorm. She was stricken in 1964 and converted to a whaler around this same time.

Selected for transfer to the Soviet Navy in Project Hula – a secret program for the transfer of U.S. Navy ships to the Soviet Navy at Cold Bay, Territory of Alaska, in anticipation of the Soviet Union joining the war against Japan – Disdain departed Burrwood, Louisiana, on 27 February 1945, transited the Panama Canal, called at San Diego, California, and arrived at Seattle, Washington, on 22 March 1945 for pre-transfer overhaul and alterations. Departing Seattle on 7 April 1945, she arrived at Cold Bay on 15 April 1945 to begin familiarization training of her new Soviet crew.

=== Soviet Navy, 1945-1960 ===
Following the completion of training for her Soviet crew, Disdain was decommissioned on 22 May 1945 at Cold Bay and transferred to the Soviet Union under Lend-Lease immediately. Also commissioned into the Soviet Navy immediately, she was designated as a tralshik ("minesweeper") and renamed T-271 in Soviet service. She soon departed Cold Bay bound for Petropavlovsk-Kamchatsky in the Soviet Union, where she served in the Soviet Far East and was converted into a naval trawler in 1948.

In February 1946, the United States began negotiations for the return of ships loaned to the Soviet Union for use during World War II, and on 8 May 1947, United States Secretary of the Navy James V. Forrestal informed the United States Department of State that the United States Department of the Navy wanted 480 of the 585 combatant ships it had transferred to the Soviet Union for World War II use returned. Deteriorating relations between the two countries as the Cold War broke out led to protracted negotiations over the ships, and by the mid-1950s the U.S. Navy found it too expensive to bring home ships that had become worthless to it anyway. Many ex-American ships were merely administratively "returned" to the United States and instead sold for scrap in the Soviet Union, while the U.S. Navy did not seriously pursue the return of others because it viewed them as no longer worth the cost of recovery. The Soviet Union never returned Disdain to the United States, although the U.S. Navy reclassified her as a "fleet minesweeper" (MSF) and redesignated her MSF-222 on 7 February 1955.

== Disposal ==
Confusion exists as to the final disposition of T-271. Sources claim both that she was scrapped in 1960 and that she remained in Soviet Navy service until 1964, when she was stricken from the Soviet Navy list and converted for civilian use as a whaling ship named Shtorm. Unaware of her fate, the U.S. Navy kept Disdain on its Naval Vessel Register until finally striking her name from it on 1 January 1983.
