= USS Implicit (AM-246) =

Minesweeper of the United States Navy

History

United States
- Name: USS Implicit (AM-246)
- Builder: Savannah Machine and Foundry Company
- Laid down: 16 March 1943
- Launched: 6 September 1943
- Commissioned: 20 January 1944
- Decommissioned: 16 November 1946
- Fate: Transferred to Republic of China, 15 June 1948
- Stricken: August 1970

History

Taiwan
- Name: ROCS Yung Chia (MSF-47)
- Acquired: 15 June 1948
- Fate: Unknown

General characteristics
- Class & type: Admirable-class minesweeper
- Displacement: 650 tons
- Length: 184 ft 6 in (56.24 m)
- Beam: 33 ft (10 m)
- Draft: 9 ft 9 in (2.97 m)
- Propulsion: 2 × ALCO 539 diesel engines, 1,710 shp (1.3 MW); Farrel-Birmingham single reduction gear; 2 shafts
- Speed: 14.8 knots (27.4 km/h)
- Complement: 104
- Armament: 1 × 3"/50 caliber gun DP; 2 × twin Bofors 40 mm guns; 1 × Hedgehog anti-submarine mortar; 2 × Depth charge tracks

Service record
- Part of: US Atlantic Fleet (1944-1945); US Pacific Fleet (1945-1946)
- Operations: Operation Dragoon
- Awards: 2 Battle stars

USS Implicit (AM-246) was an Admirable-class minesweeper built for the U.S. Navy during World War II. She was built to clear minefields in offshore waters, and served the Navy in the North Atlantic Ocean and then in the Pacific Ocean. She finished the war with two battle stars to her credit.

Implicit was launched by Savannah Machine & Foundry Co., Savannah, Georgia, 6 September 1943; sponsored by Mrs. Helen P. Page, and commissioned 20 January 1944.

== World War II North Atlantic operations ==
Following her shakedown training in Chesapeake and Casco Bays, Implicit sailed from Norfolk, Virginia, 21 April 1944 on convoy duty to Bermuda. She steamed between Norfolk and Caribbean ports on escort duty until returning to Hampton Roads 16 June 1944. The ship then prepared for her part in the invasion of southern France, sailing 24 July 1944 with transports bound for Oran, Algeria. She arrived off southern France 20 August 1944, 5 days after the initial landings, and began a daily schedule of minesweeping and patrolling. She disposed of many floating mines, and exchanged fire with a shore battery 6 and 10 September 1944. Implicit sailed from San Rafael for Bizerte 23 October 1944 where she conducted minesweeping exercises.

The ship sailed from Palermo 18 January 1945 and after stopping at Athens and Istanbul arrived Yalta 31 January 1945 to be on hand at the historic Yalta Conference of Allied heads of state. After the conference she retraced her steps, arriving Palermo 21 February. After antisubmarine exercises, Implicit sailed in convoy for the United States, arriving Norfolk 5 May 1945.

== Transfer to the Pacific Fleet ==
With the war in Europe over, she prepared for Pacific service, and sailed 5 July 1945 via the Panama Canal for San Diego. There the ship conducted minesweeping and countermeasures exercises in California waters before arriving Pearl Harbor 20 August 1945, five days after the surrender of Japan.

The end of the war brought rigorous duty for fleet minesweepers, and Implicit sailed 3 September 1945 for Eniwetok, Saipan, Okinawa, and other Pacific Islands to take up minefields. She also performed this vital dangerous duty in Sasebo harbor and in the South China Sea, as well as in Formosa Strait. The ship sailed from Eniwetok 18 February 1946, and arrived San Pedro, California, via the Hawaiian Islands 18 March 1946. She remained there until 20 July 1946, when the veteran ship got underway for transfer to China.

== Decommissioning ==
Steaming via Eniwetok and the Philippines, she arrived Subic Bay 30 October 1946 and decommissioned 16 November 1946. After much delay she was eventually turned over to the Nationalist Chinese Navy 15 June 1948 where she served as Yung Chia (MSF-47). She was decommissioned in August 1970 and was struck from the Naval Vessel Register. Fate unknown.

== Awards ==
Implicit received two battle stars for World War II service.
