= USS Nimble (AM-266) =

Minesweeper of the United States Navy

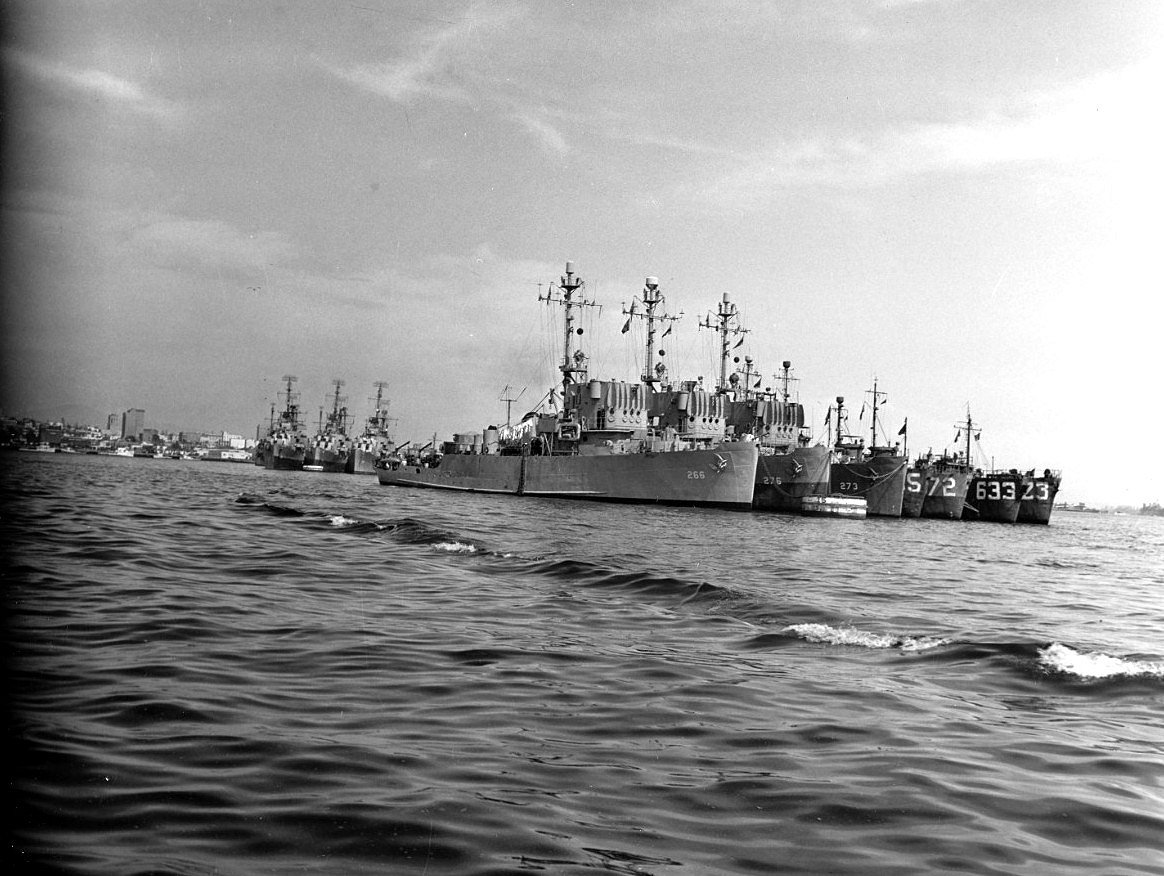
- Nimble at the front of a nest of minesweepers and LCIs at San Diego in 1945.

History

United States
- Name: USS Nimble
- Builder: American Ship Building Company
- Laid down: 2 August 1943
- Launched: 24 December 1943
- Sponsored by: Mrs. Fred Obert
- Commissioned: 15 September 1944
- Decommissioned: 10 October 1946
- Fate: Transferred to the Republic of China, 30 June 1948
- Stricken: 13 July 1948

Republic of China
- Name: unknown
- Acquired: 30 June 1948
- Decommissioned: 1950
- Fate: Unknown

General characteristics
- Class & type: Admirable-class minesweeper
- Displacement: 650 tons
- Length: 184 ft 6 in (56.24 m)
- Beam: 33 ft (10 m)
- Draft: 9 ft 9 in (2.97 m)
- Propulsion: 2 × ALCO 539 diesel engines, 1,710 shp (1.3 MW); Farrel-Birmingham single reduction gear; 2 shafts
- Speed: 14.8 knots (27.4 km/h)
- Complement: 104
- Armament: 1 × 3"/50 caliber gun DP; 2 × twin Bofors 40 mm guns; 1 × Hedgehog anti-submarine mortar; 2 × Depth charge tracks

Service record
- Part of: US Atlantic Fleet (1944-1945); US Pacific Fleet (1945-1946)
- Awards: 3 Battle stars

USS Nimble (AM-266) was an Admirable-class minesweeper built for the U.S. Navy during World War II. She was built to clear minefields in offshore waters, and served the Navy in the Atlantic Ocean and then was transferred to the Pacific Ocean. Post-war, she returned home with three battle stars.

Nimble was laid down 2 August 1943 by the American Ship Building Company, Lorain, Ohio; launched 24 December 1943; and commissioned 15 September 1944.

== World War II Atlantic operations ==
Nimble departed Cleveland, Ohio, 21 September 1944 and proceeded via the St. Lawrence River to the Atlantic and down the coast to Little Creek, Virginia, for shakedown exercises in Chesapeake Bay. From there she steamed south to Key West, Florida, for ASW training and on 20 December reported to the Naval Training Center Miami, Florida, for duty as a school ship. Detached 10 March 1945 she headed north to Philadelphia, Pennsylvania, underwent repairs and alterations and, on 1 April, got underway for the Panama Canal Zone.

== Transfer to the Pacific Fleet ==
She transited the Canal 11 April and, after stops at San Diego, California, Pearl Harbor, Eniwetok, and Guam, arrived in Nakagusuku Wan, Okinawa, 28 June.

On the 29th Nimble shifted to Kerama Retto whence she commenced sweeping the East China Sea as part of Operation Juneau. In mid-August, following the end of the war, Operation Skagway continued her mine clearance efforts in the East China Sea and Ryūkyūs area. At the end of the month, "Arcadia" took her to the Yellow Sea and from 2–7 September she cleared the approaches to Jinsen harbor for the entry of the 7th Amphibious Force into Korea for initial occupation duty. On the 9th she returned to waters off Kyūshū to sweep the Sasebo-Nagasaki area.

The minesweeper remained in the Far East opening sea-lanes to merchant and military shipping until September 1946.

== Post-War decommissioning ==
On the 15th she reported to Commander, Philippine Sea Frontier for inactivation. Decommissioning at Subic Bay 10 October, she remained in the Philippines until transferred to the Republic of China 30 June 1948. Struck from the U.S. Navy List 13 July 1948, she served the Navy of the Republic of China until stripped and decommissioned late in 1950.
