= USS Embattle (AM-226) =

Minesweeper of the United States Navy

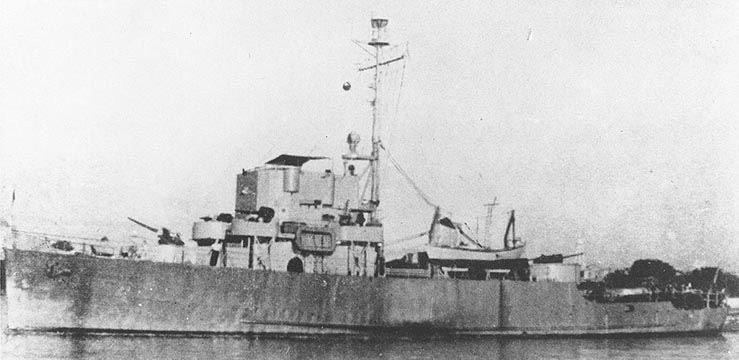

History

United States
- Name: USS Embattle (AM-226)
- Builder: American Ship Building Company, Lorain, Ohio
- Laid down: 6 April 1944
- Launched: 17 September 1944
- Commissioned: 25 April 1945
- Decommissioned: 29 May 1946
- Fate: Transferred to the Republic of China, 29 May 1946

History

Taiwan
- Name: Yung Hsing (A 7)
- Acquired: 29 May 1946
- Fate: Unknown

General characteristics
- Class & type: Admirable-class minesweeper
- Displacement: 650 long tons (660 t)
- Length: 184 ft 6 in (56.24 m)
- Beam: 33 ft (10 m)
- Draft: 9 ft 9 in (2.97 m)
- Propulsion: 2 × ALCO 539 diesel engines, 1,710 shp (1,280 kW); Farrel-Birmingham single reduction gear; 2 shafts
- Speed: 15 knots (28 km/h)
- Complement: 104
- Armament: 1 × 3"/50 caliber (76 mm) DP gun; 2 × twin Bofors 40 mm guns; 1 × Hedgehog anti-submarine mortar; 2 × Depth charge tracks

Service record
- Part of: U.S. Pacific Fleet (1945–1946); Chinese Maritime Customs Service (from 1946)
- Awards: 1 Battle star

USS Embattle (AM-226) was an Admirable-class minesweeper built for the United States Navy during World War II. She earned two battle stars in service in the Pacific during World War II. In May 1946, she was turned over to the Republic of China for service with the Chinese Maritime Customs Service as Yung Hsing. Her fate is unreported in secondary sources.

== Career ==
Embattle was launched 17 September 1944 by American Shipbuilding Co., Lorain, Ohio; and commissioned 25 April 1945.

Embattle sailed from Cleveland, Ohio, 30 April 1945 via the St. Lawrence Waterway and after voyage repairs at Boston, Massachusetts, and shakedown exercises at Norfolk, Virginia, was en route to the Pacific when the war ended. After calling at San Pedro, California, she continued to Okinawa, arriving 6 November to aid in the postwar minesweeping operations there and in Japanese waters.

Reporting to Subic Bay, Philippine Islands, 21 March 1946, she was demilitarized and departed for Shanghai, China. She was decommissioned there 29 May 1946, and turned over on the same day to the Chinese Maritime Commission via the Foreign Liquidation Commission of the State Department. She was renamed Yung Hsing (A 7). Her fate is unknown.

Embattle received one battle star for World War II service.
