= USS Dunlin =

Minesweeper of the United States Navy

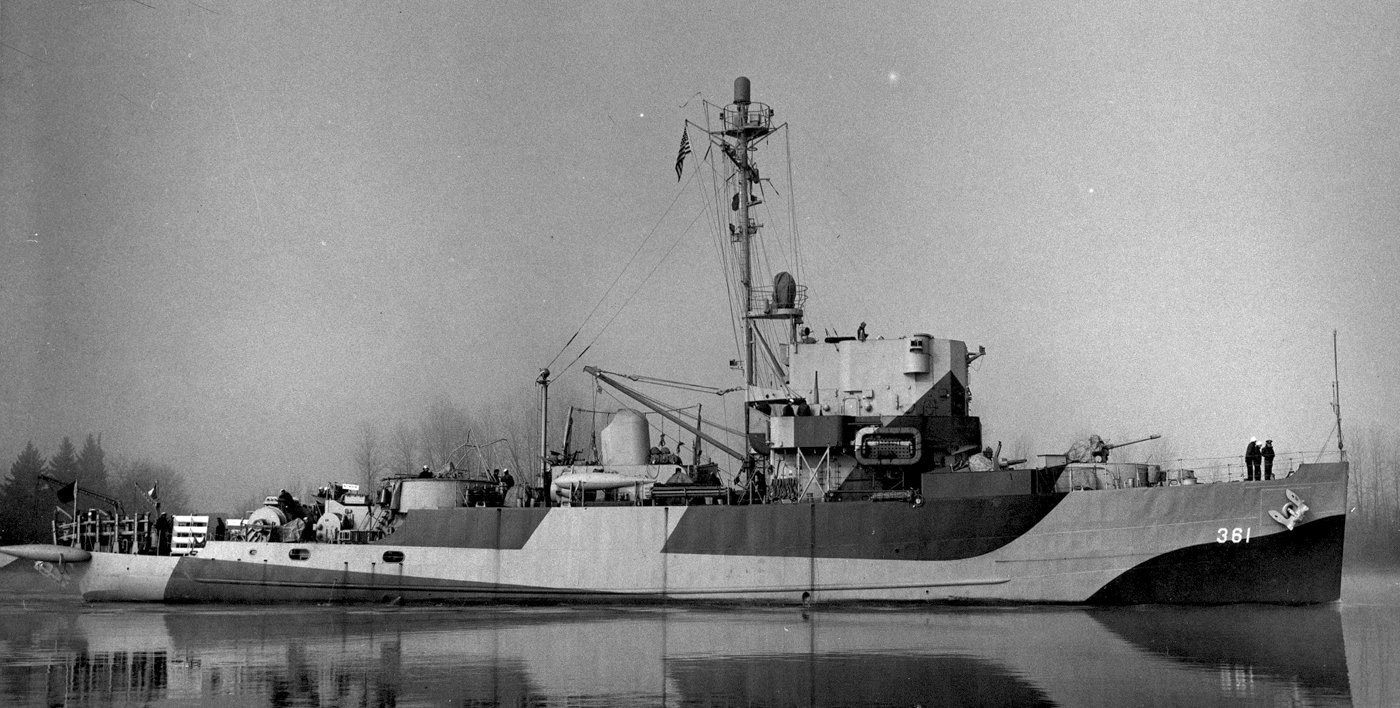
- Dunlin at Willamette, Oregon on 1 March 1945.

History

United States
- Name: Dunlin
- Builder: Willamette Iron and Steel Works, Portland, Oregon
- Laid down: 29 January 1943
- Launched: 26 August 1943
- Sponsored by: Mrs. Ernest E. Lissy
- Commissioned: 16 February 1945
- Decommissioned: 29 May 1946
- Identification: AM-361
- Fate: Transferred to the Republic of China, 1946

Taiwan
- Name: Unknown
- Acquired: 1946

General characteristics
- Class & type: Admirable-class minesweeper
- Displacement: 650 long tons (660 t)
- Length: 184 ft 6 in (56.24 m)
- Beam: 33 ft (10 m)
- Draft: 9 ft 9 in (2.97 m)
- Propulsion: 2 × ALCO 539 diesel engines, 1,710 shp (1,280 kW); Farrel-Birmingham single reduction gear; 2 shafts
- Speed: 15 knots (28 km/h; 17 mph)
- Complement: 104
- Armament: 1 × 3"/50 caliber (76 mm) DP gun; 2 × twin Bofors 40 mm guns; 1 × Hedgehog anti-submarine mortar; 2 × Depth charge tracks

Service record
- Part of: U.S. Pacific Fleet (1945–1946); Chinese Maritime Customs Service (from 1946)
- Awards: 3 Battle stars

USS Dunlin (AM-361) was an Admirable-class minesweeper built for the United States Navy during World War II. She earned three battle stars in service in the Pacific during World War II. In May 1946, she was turned over to the Republic of China for service with the Chinese Maritime Customs Service. Her fate is unreported in secondary sources.

== Career ==
Dunlin was launched 26 August 1943 by Willamette Iron and Steel Corp., Portland, Oregon; sponsored by Mrs. Ernest E. Lissy; and commissioned 16 February 1945.

Dunlin arrived at Guam from San Pedro, California, 7 June 1945. Ten days later she sailed for Okinawa to join in sweeping operations in the East China Sea in coordination with the U.S. 3rd Fleet strikes against Japan. On 6 September Dunlin left Okinawa to sweep the approaches to Sasebo and Nagasaki. Between 20 September and 31 October she cleared Bungo Suido area and after an escort voyage between Hiro Wan and Kure, arrived at Sasebo 20 November to unload her minesweeping gear and supervise Japanese minesweepers operating in Ozue and Ariake bays.

Dunlin put out from Sasebo 18 January 1946 for Pusan, Korea, arriving the next day. She checked the harbor for acoustic mines, then carried cargo from Chinhae for Allied vessels at Fusan. She was at Sasebo from 1 February until 4 March, then escorted four YMSs by way of Hong Kong to Subic Bay arriving 18 March.

She was demilitarized there and sailed to Shanghai, China, arriving 22 April. Dunlin was decommissioned 29 May 1946 and turned over to the Foreign Liquidation Committee of the State Department for transfer to the Chinese Maritime Commission.

Dunlin received three battle stars for World War II service.
