= USS Counsel =

Minesweeper of the United States Navy

History

United States
- Name: USS Counsel
- Builder: Willamette Iron and Steel Works
- Laid down: 15 June 1942
- Launched: 17 February 1943
- Commissioned: 27 May 1944
- Decommissioned: 15 January 1947
- Reclassified: MSF-165, 7 February 1955
- Stricken: 1 July 1972
- Fate: Sold for scrap 1 September 1973

General characteristics
- Class & type: Admirable-class minesweeper
- Displacement: 650 tons
- Length: 184 ft 6 in (56.24 m)
- Beam: 33 ft (10 m)
- Draft: 9 ft 9 in (2.97 m)
- Propulsion: 2 × ALCO 539 diesel engines, 1,710 shp (1.3 MW); Farrel-Birmingham single reduction gear; 2 shafts
- Speed: 14.8 knots (27.4 km/h)
- Complement: 104
- Armament: 1 × 3"/50 caliber gun DP; 2 × twin Bofors 40 mm guns; 1 × Hedgehog anti-submarine mortar; 2 × Depth charge tracks

Service record
- Part of: US Pacific Fleet (1944-1946)
- Awards: 1 Battle star

USS Counsel (AM-165) was an Admirable-class minesweeper built for the U.S. Navy during World War II. She was built to clear minefields in offshore waters, and served the Navy in the Pacific Ocean.

She was launched 17 February 1943 by Willamette Iron and Steel Works, Portland, Oregon, and commissioned 27 May 1944. She was reclassified MSF-165, 7 February 1955.

== World War II Pacific Ocean operations ==
Sailing from San Francisco, California, 8 August 1944, Counsel was repaired at Pearl Harbor and escorted a convoy to Eniwetok, arriving 20 September. Five days later, she was underway for Saipan for patrol and escort duty during which she rescued three naval aviators off Tinian on 18 October. Arriving at Ulithi 26 October, she continued her patrols, and was assigned on 10 November to escort the damaged USS Canberra to Manus, towing in tandem with SS Watch Hill during the last two days of the trip. Counsel returned to Ulithi 24 November, and sailed two days later for the landings on Peleliu, Palau Islands, where she patrolled against submarines until 15 December. After an overhaul at Eniwetok, Counsel sailed out of that port on convoy escort duty to Guam, Saipan, Iwo Jima, Ulithi, and Tarawa, and on antisubmarine patrol and minesweeping operations until the end of the war. She arrived in Buckner Bay, Okinawa, 23 August 1945, and until 6 November swept mines in Japanese and Chinese waters, from Sasebo.

== Post-War Decommissioning ==
On 20 November Counsel sailed for home, arriving at San Francisco 19 December. Counsel was placed out of commission in reserve 15 January 1947 at San Diego, California. She was struck from the Navy List on 1 July 1972 and sold for scrap, 1 September 1973.

== Awards ==
Counsel received one battle star for World War II service.
