= USS Execute =

Minesweeper of the United States Navy

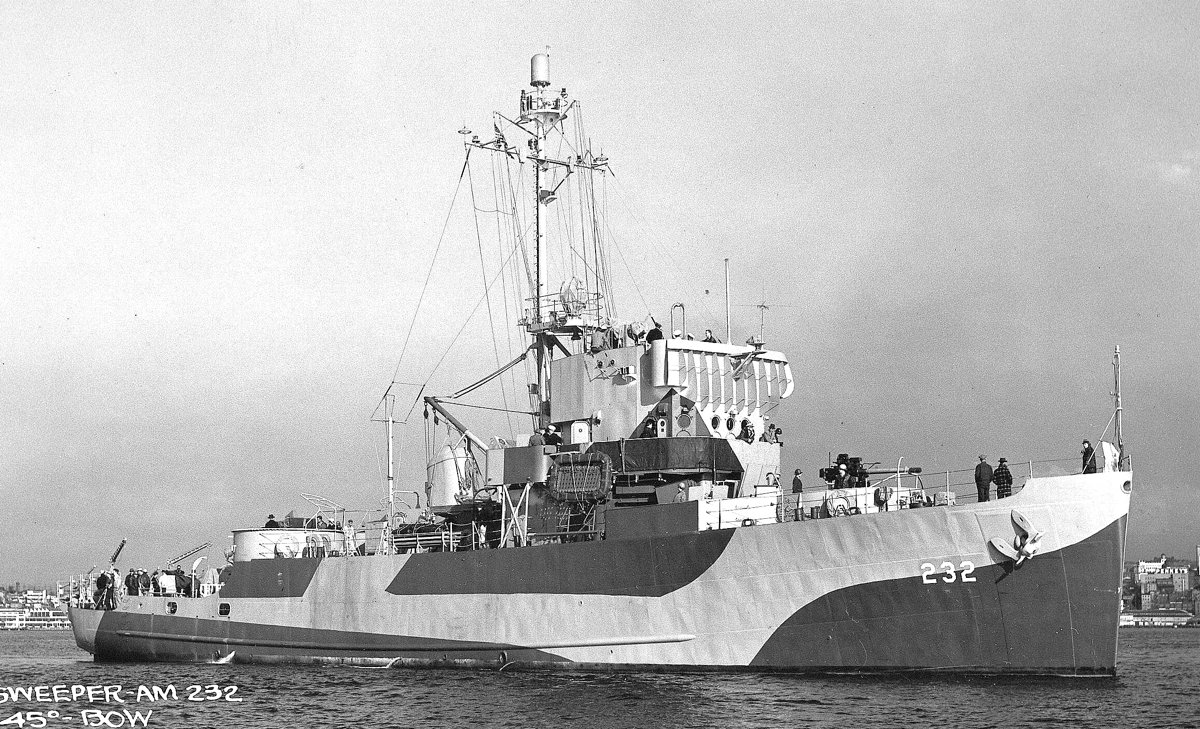
- Execute at Puget Sound Bridge and Dredging Co., Seattle, WA on November 10, 1944.

History

United States
- Name: USS PCE-905
- Builder: Puget Sound Bridge and Dredging Company, Seattle
- Laid down: 29 March 1944
- Renamed: USS Execute (AM-232)
- Launched: 22 June 1944
- Sponsored by: Mrs. R. J. Huff
- Commissioned: 15 November 1944
- Decommissioned: 6 August 1946
- Reclassified: MSF-232, 7 February 1955
- Stricken: 1 May 1962
- Fate: Transferred to Mexican Navy, 1962

History

Mexico
- Name: ARM DM-03
- Acquired: 1962
- Renamed: ARM General Juan N. Méndez (C51), 1994
- Namesake: Juan N. Méndez
- Stricken: 16 July 2001
- Fate: unknown

General characteristics
- Class & type: PCE-905-class patrol craft
- Class & type: Admirable-class minesweeper, by June 1944
- Displacement: 650 long tons (660 t)
- Length: 184 ft 6 in (56.24 m)
- Beam: 33 ft (10 m)
- Draft: 9 ft 9 in (2.97 m)
- Propulsion: 2 × ALCO 539 diesel engines, 1,710 shp (1,280 kW); Farrel-Birmingham single reduction gear; 2 shafts
- Speed: 15 knots (28 km/h)
- Complement: 104
- Armament: 1 × 3"/50 caliber (76 mm) DP gun; 2 × twin Bofors 40 mm guns; 1 × Hedgehog anti-submarine mortar; 2 × Depth charge tracks

Service record
- Part of: U.S. Pacific Fleet (1944–1946); Mexican Navy (1962–2001)
- Operations: Battle of Okinawa

USS Execute (AM-232) was an Admirable-class minesweeper built for the United States Navy during World War II. She was originally ordered and laid down as USS PCE-905, the lead ship of the PCE-905 class of patrol craft. She was reclassified as an Admirable-class minesweeper by the time of her June 1944 launch, and named Execute by the time of her November 1944 commissioning. After service in the Pacific during World War II, she was decommissioned in August 1946 and placed in reserve. While she remained in reserve, Execute was reclassified as MSF-232 in February 1955 but never reactivated. In 1962, she was sold to the Mexican Navy and renamed ARM DM-03. In 1994, she was renamed ARM General Juan N. Méndez (C51). She was stricken in July 2001, but her ultimate fate is not reported in secondary sources.

== U.S. Navy career ==
Originally ordered as PCE-905, the lead ship of the PCE-905 class of patrol craft, the ship was laid down at the Puget Sound Bridge and Dredging Company of Seattle. She was reclassified as an Admirable-class minesweeper and assigned the hull code of AM-232 by the time of her 22 June 1944, launch by sponsor Mrs. R. J. Huff. By the time of her 15 November 1944, commissioning, she had been assigned the name Execute.

Following shakedown cruise she departed for Pearl Harbor whence she escorted a convoy to Leyte via Eniwetok, Ulithi and Kossol Roads during February 1945. On 26 March, as part of the preliminary assault force for the invasion of the Ryukyus, she screened landing craft against countless air attacks

Early in April she served with the Sweep Unit in clearing the bays of Nakagusuku and Chimu and defended vessels against kamikaze attack. She participated in the Battle of Okinawa. During this battle she picked up 70 survivors of the USS Mullany (DD-528) after it had been hit by a Japanese plane. She remained on sweeping duty, participating in a feint landing on 20 April to draw attention from a large-scale advance on Naha. From June through 10 September she swept in the Yellow Sea and in Japanese coastal waters.

In March 1946, Execute transited the Panama Canal and on 6 August 1946, was placed out of commission in reserve at Orange, Texas. While she remained in reserve, Execute was reclassified (MSF-232) on 7 February 1955. She was stricken from the Navy List on 1 May 1962, and sold to Mexico later in the year.

== Mexican Navy career ==
The former Execute was acquired by the Mexican Navy in 1962 and renamed ARM DM-03. In 1994, she was renamed ARM General Juan N. Méndez (C51) after Juan N. Méndez. She was stricken on 16 July 2001, but her ultimate fate is not reported in secondary sources.
