= USS Dipper =

Minesweeper of the United States Navy

History

United States
- Name: USS PCE-917
- Builder: Willamette Iron and Steel Works
- Laid down: 19 November 1943
- Renamed: USS Dipper (AM-357)
- Launched: 26 July 1944
- Sponsored by: Miss A. L. Gaffney
- Commissioned: 26 December 1945
- Decommissioned: 14 January 1947
- Reclassified: MSF-357, 7 February 1955
- Fate: Sold for scrap, 5 January 1961

General characteristics
- Class & type: PCE-905-class patrol craft
- Class & type: Admirable-class minesweeper, September 1943
- Displacement: 650 long tons (660 t)
- Length: 184 ft 6 in (56.24 m)
- Beam: 33 ft (10 m)
- Draft: 9 ft 9 in (2.97 m)
- Propulsion: 2 × ALCO 539 diesel engines, 1,710 shp (1,280 kW); Farrel-Birmingham single reduction gear; 2 shafts
- Speed: 15 knots (28 km/h)
- Complement: 104
- Armament: 1 × 3"/50 caliber (76 mm) DP gun; 2 × twin Bofors 40 mm guns; 1 × Hedgehog anti-submarine mortar; 2 × Depth charge tracks

Service record
- Part of: Pacific Reserve Fleet (1945-1961)

USS Dipper (AM-357) was an Admirable-class minesweeper built for the United States Navy during World War II. The ship was ordered and laid down as PCE-905-class patrol craft USS PCE-917 but was renamed and reclassified before her July 1944 launch as Dipper (AM-357). Dipper was launched 26 July 1944 by Willamette Iron and Steel Works, Portland, Oregon; sponsored by Miss A. L. Gaffney; and commissioned 26 December 1945. Dipper sailed from Portland 11 January 1946 to join the U.S. 19th Fleet (Reserve) at San Diego, California, four days later. She provided various services for this group until placed out of commission in reserve 15 January 1947. She was reclassified MSF-357, 7 February 1955. Dipper was sold for scrap on 5 January 1961.
