= USS Invade =

US Navy minesweeper (from 1944 to 1962)

History

United States
- Name: USS Invade (AM-254)
- Builder: Savannah Machine and Foundry Company, Savannah, Georgia
- Laid down: 19 January 1944
- Launched: 6 February 1944
- Sponsored by: Miss Thayer C. Allen
- Commissioned: 18 September 1944
- Decommissioned: 7 August 1946
- Reclassified: MSF-254, 7 February 1955
- Stricken: 1 May 1962
- Fate: transferred to Mexican Navy, 30 August 1962

History

Mexico
- Name: ARM DM-18
- Acquired: 30 August 1962
- Renamed: ARM General Ignacio Zaragoza (C60), 1994
- Namesake: Ignacio Zaragoza
- Stricken: 16 July 2001
- Fate: unknown

General characteristics
- Class & type: Admirable-class minesweeper
- Displacement: 650 long tons (660 t)
- Length: 184 ft 6 in (56.24 m)
- Beam: 33 ft (10 m)
- Draft: 9 ft 9 in (2.97 m)
- Propulsion: 2 × ALCO 539 diesel engines, 1,710 shp (1,280 kW); Farrel-Birmingham single reduction gear; 2 shafts
- Speed: 15 knots (28 km/h)
- Complement: 104
- Armament: 1 × 3"/50 caliber (76 mm) DP gun; 2 × twin Bofors 40 mm guns; 1 × Hedgehog anti-submarine mortar; 2 × Depth charge tracks

Service record
- Part of: U.S. Pacific Fleet (1944–1946); Atlantic Reserve Fleet (1946–1962); Mexican Navy (1962–2001)

USS Invade (AM-254) was an Admirable-class minesweeper built for the United States Navy during World War II. She served in the Pacific during World War II. She was decommissioned in August 1946 and placed in reserve. While she remained in reserve, Invade was reclassified as MSF-254 in February 1955 but never reactivated. In August 1962, she was sold to the Mexican Navy and renamed ARM DM-18. In 1994 she was renamed ARM General Ignacio Zaragoza (C60). She was stricken in July 2001, but her ultimate fate is not reported in secondary sources.

== U.S. Navy career ==
Invade was laid down 19 January 1944 by Savannah Machine & Foundry Co., Savannah, Georgia; launched 6 February 1944; sponsored by Miss Thayer C. Allen; and commissioned 18 September 1944. After shakedown in Chesapeake Bay, Invade steamed to Casco Bay, Maine, for training 24 November 1944. Following these operations and additional drills out of Norfolk, Virginia, the minecraft assumed duties there as towing ship for aircraft targets and as an experimental minesweeper. She remained on this important duty through the end of the war and reported 21 September 1945 to the Mine Warfare School at Yorktown, Virginia, as a training ship.

Invade decommissioned 7 August 1946 and joined the Atlantic Reserve Fleet at Orange, Texas. She was reclassified MSF-254 on 7 February 1955, and struck from the Naval Vessel Register on 1 May 1962. She was sold to Mexico on 30 August 1962.

== Mexican Navy career ==
The former Invade was acquired by the Mexican Navy in August 1962 and renamed ARM DM-18. In 1994, she was renamed ARM General Ignacio Zaragoza (C60) after Ignacio Zaragoza. She was stricken on 16 July 2001, but her ultimate fate is not reported in secondary sources.
