= USS Spear =

Minesweeper of the United States Navy

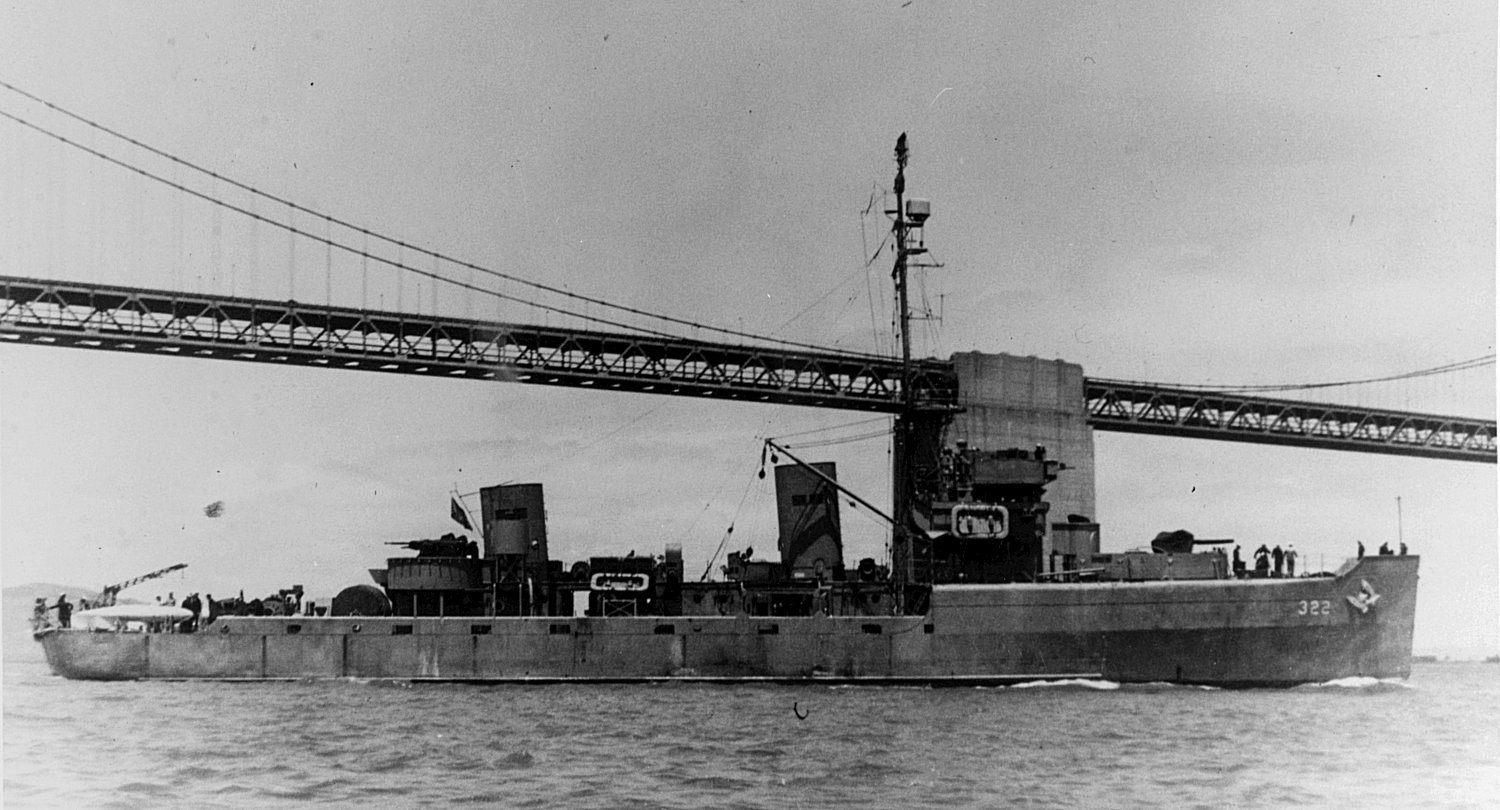
- Spear off San Francisco, California, circa 1945

History

United States
- Name: HMS Errant (BAM-22)
- Builder: Associated Shipbuilders, Seattle, Washington
- Laid down: 28 October 1942
- Renamed: USS Spear (AM-322), 23 January 1943
- Launched: 25 February 1943
- Commissioned: 31 December 1943
- Decommissioned: 1 August 1946
- Reclassified: MSF-322, 7 February 1955
- Stricken: 1 July 1972
- Honors and awards: 4 battle stars (World War II)
- Fate: Sold to Mexico, 19 September 1972

History

Mexico
- Name: ARM Ignacio de la Llave (C76)
- Namesake: Ignacio de la Llave
- Acquired: 19 September 1972
- Reclassified: G08
- Reclassified: P107, 1993
- Decommissioned: retired from service by 2004
- Fate: unknown

General characteristics
- Class & type: Auk-class minesweeper
- Displacement: 890 long tons (904 t)
- Length: 221 ft 3 in (67.44 m)
- Beam: 32 ft (9.8 m)
- Draft: 10 ft 9 in (3.28 m)
- Speed: 18 knots (33 km/h; 21 mph)
- Complement: 100 officers and enlisted
- Armament: 1 × 3"/50 caliber gun; 2 × 40 mm guns; 2 × 20 mm guns; 2 × Depth charge tracks

USS Spear (AM-322) was an Auk-class minesweeper acquired by the United States Navy for the dangerous task of removing mines from minefields laid in the water to prevent ships from passing.

Spear was laid down as HMS Errant (BAM-22) on 28 October 1942 by Associated Shipbuilders, Seattle, Washington; renamed USS Spear and reclassified AM-322 on 23 January 1943; launched on 25 February 1943; sponsored by Miss Lois Wilcox; and commissioned on 31 December 1943.

== World War II Pacific operations ==
Following outfitting at Seattle, Washington, and shakedown off the California coast. Spear joined a convoy on 25 March 1944 and sailed from San Francisco as an escort. Five days later, she was ordered to proceed independently to Hawaii. The minesweeper conducted training exercises there until 3 May when she was assigned escort duty for convoys carrying troops and supplies to advance bases in the Marshall Islands at Majuro, Eniwetok, and Kwajalein.

=== Supporting the Guam assault ===
On 17 July, the minesweeper was attached to a convoy of LST's and proceeded to a rendezvous point just south of Guam for the impending amphibious assault on that island. The minesweeper was then assigned patrol duties in the transport screen off Orote Point. On 28 July, Spear had to maneuver to avoid enemy shellfire from the beach. During the remainder of the campaign, she escorted oilers on their nightly retirement from the assault area and conducted antisubmarine searches. She then returned to Pearl Harbor and resumed escort trips to advance bases.

=== Okinawa campaign ===
Spear conducted antisubmarine patrols off Ulithi during the first three weeks of December 1944; escorted a convoy to Hollandia; and then resumed her ASW duties off Ulithi until mid-March 1945. On the 19th, she sortied with Task Group (TG) 52.14, Minesweeper Group 1 of the Amphibious Support Force, for the Okinawa assault. On the night of 26 March, Spear rescued several downed fliers. During the campaign, the minesweeper protected anchorages from enemy submarines and swept enemy mines. In 82 days of uninterrupted operations off Okinawa, Spear was under almost daily aerial attack, logging 202 attacks by enemy planes in April.

Spear steamed to Guam in June for tender availability and, six weeks later, was back at Okinawa when hostilities with Japan ended.

=== End-of-war operations ===
Following the return of peace, she joined in mine-sweeping operations in the East China Sea; helped to clear the approach to and the mouth of the Yangtze River; swept mines off Chefoo, China; and participated in further sweeping operations off Jinsen, Korea, before returning to Shanghai and joining the Yangtze River Patrol Force. On 17 November, she got underway for Sasebo, Japan. Spear departed Japanese waters on 29 November 1945 en route to the United States, via Pearl Harbor.

== Decommissioning ==
Upon returning to San Diego, California, Spear was decommissioned and, in August 1946, was placed "in reserve, out of commission", with the Pacific Reserve Fleet. On 7 February 1955, the minesweeper's designation was changed to MSF-322. She was struck from the Navy List on 1 July 1972 and sold to the government of Mexico on 19 September.

== Awards ==
Spear received four battle stars for her World War II service.

== Mexican Navy service ==
On 19 September 1972, the former Spear was sold to the Mexican Navy which renamed her ARM Ignacio de la Llave (C76). Her pennant number was later changed to G08, and changed again in 1993 to P107. Ignacio de la Llave had been retired from service by 2004.
