= USS Notable (AM-267) =

Minesweeper of the United States Navy

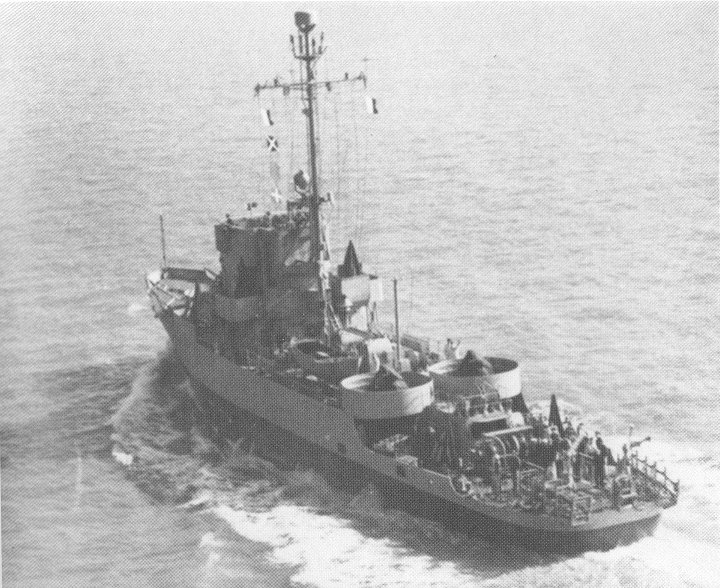

History

United States
- Name: USS Notable (AM-267)
- Builder: Gulf Shipbuilding Company
- Laid down: 17 September 1942
- Launched: 12 June 1943
- Sponsored by: Mrs. John F. Brown
- Commissioned: 23 December 1943
- Decommissioned: 29 May 1946
- Fate: Transferred to the Chinese Maritime Customs Service, 1946

History

Republic of China
- Name: unknown
- Acquired: 1946
- Fate: unknown

General characteristics
- Class & type: Admirable-class minesweeper
- Displacement: 650 long tons (660 t)
- Length: 184 ft 6 in (56.24 m)
- Beam: 33 ft (10 m)
- Draft: 9 ft 9 in (2.97 m)
- Propulsion: 2 × ALCO 539 diesel engines, 1,710 shp (1.3 MW); Farrel-Birmingham single reduction gear; 2 shafts
- Speed: 14.8 knots (27.4 km/h)
- Complement: 104
- Armament: 1 × 3"/50 caliber gun; 2 × twin Bofors 40 mm gun; 1 × Hedgehog anti-submarine mortar; 2 × Depth charge tracks

Service record
- Part of: U.S. Atlantic Fleet (1943–1945); U.S. Pacific Fleet (1945–1946); Chinese Maritime Customs Service (from 1946)
- Awards: 2 Battle stars

USS Notable (AM-267) was an Admirable-class minesweeper built for the United States Navy during World War II. She earned two battle stars in service in the Atlantic and the Pacific during the war. In 1946, she was decommissioned and turned over to the Republic of China for service with the Chinese Maritime Customs Service. Her ultimate fate is unreported in secondary sources.

== Career ==
Notable was laid down 17 September 1942 by the Gulf Shipbuilding Corp., Chickasaw, Alabama launched 12 June 1943; sponsored by Mrs. John F. Brown and commissioned 23 December 1943. Following a brief shakedown cruise by way of New Orleans, Louisiana, to Little Creek, Virginia, and service providing minecraft training for pre-commissioning crews, Notable departed Norfolk, Virginia, 3 May 1944 for Argentia, Newfoundland, where she took on U.S. Coast Guard meteorologists and sailed 22 June for Davis Strait. There, the minesweeper took up station as a weather patrol ship, providing North Atlantic convoys with vital weather data for their crossings. On 27 October, she was ordered to Boston, Massachusetts, and then Norfolk for minesweeping training and overhaul.

Notable departed Norfolk in February 1945 for the Pacific sailing via Bermuda, the Panama Canal, and San Diego, California, arriving Pearl Harbor 5 April. After more training, the mine sweeper put out from Pearl, 28 April bound for the Western Pacific; and on 24 May, joined task unit TU 94.19.18 for Okinawa. From 30 May to 4 July 1945, the little ship operated in and around Kerama Retto on antiaircraft patrols, and then began continuous duty with minesweepers in the East China Sea, sweeping over 100 contact mines in a period of two months and then engaging in occupation duty following the surrender of Japan 2 September. Notable continued on sweeping and patrol missions in the Western Pacific.

She decommissioned 29 May 1946 and was turned over to the Foreign Liquidation Commission at Shanghai, China, where she was simultaneously transferred to the Chinese Maritime Customs Service. Her name in Chinese service and her fate are not reported in secondary sources.

Notable received 2 battle stars for World War II service
