= Operation Juneau =

Operation Juneau was a post-World War II U.S. Navy operation which required pre-invasion clearing the minefields in the East China Sea in 1945.

== Example of use ==
USS Nimble (AM-266)
