= USS Rampart =

Minesweeper of the United States Navy

History

United States
- Name: USS Rampart (AM-282)
- Builder: Gulf Shipbuilding Corporation, Chickasaw, Alabama
- Laid down: 24 November 1943
- Launched: 30 March 1944
- Commissioned: 18 November 1944
- Decommissioned: 21 May 1945
- Fate: Transferred to Soviet Navy, 21 May 1945
- Reclassified: MSF-282, 7 February 1955
- Stricken: 1 January 1983

History

Soviet Union
- Name: T-282
- Acquired: 21 May 1945
- Commissioned: 21 May 1945
- Refit: Converted to naval trawler, 1948
- Renamed: Shkval, 1948
- Fate: Scrapped 1960

General characteristics
- Class & type: Admirable-class minesweeper
- Displacement: 650 tons
- Length: 184 ft 6 in (56.24 m)
- Beam: 33 ft (10 m)
- Draft: 9 ft 9 in (2.97 m)
- Propulsion: 2 × ALCO 539 diesel engines, 1,710 shp (1.3 MW); Farrel-Birmingham single reduction gear; 2 shafts
- Speed: 14.8 knots (27.4 km/h)
- Complement: 104
- Armament: 1 × 3"/50 caliber gun DP; 2 × twin Bofors 40 mm guns; 1 × Hedgehog anti-submarine mortar; 2 × Depth charge tracks

Service record
- Part of: United States Atlantic Fleet (1944-1945); Soviet Pacific Ocean Fleet (1945-1960)

USS Rampart (AM-282) was an Admirable-class minesweeper built for the United States Navy during World War II and in commission from 1944 to 1945. In 1945, she was transferred to the Soviet Union and after that served in the Soviet Navy as T-282. She was converted to a naval trawler in 1948 and renamed Shkval.

== Construction and commissioning ==
Rampart was laid down on 24 November 1943 at Chickasaw, Alabama, by the Gulf Shipbuilding Corporation, launched on 30 March 1944, sponsored by Mrs. Frank S. Scott, and commissioned on 18 November 1944.

== Service history ==
=== U.S. Navy, World War II, 1944-1945 ===
After shakedown in the Gulf of Mexico, Rampart got underway on 8 December 1944 and arrived at Little Creek, Virginia, on 13 December 1944. She operated out of Little Creek, conducting minesweeping exercises, until 15 January 1945, when she left bound for Casco Bay, Maine, for antisubmarine warfare training.

Rampart then returned to Hampton Roads, Virginia, and got underway on 25 January 1945 for the Panama Canal Zone, reaching Coco Solo Naval Base on 1 February 1945. She transited the Panama Canal and proceeded to San Diego, California, before moving on Pearl Harbor, Territory of Hawaii, where she arrived on 24 February 1945.

Selected for transfer to the Soviet Navy in Project Hula – a secret program for the transfer of U.S. Navy ships to the Soviet Navy at Cold Bay, Territory of Alaska, in anticipation of the Soviet Union joining the war against Japan – Rampart departed Pearl Harbor on 7 March 1945 in company with three other ships earmarked for Project Hula – her sister ship USS Fancy (AM-234) and the auxiliary motor minesweepers USS YMS-38 and USS YMS-237 – bound for Seattle, Washington, which they reached on 19 March 1945.

On 7 April 1945, Rampart departed Seattle for Kodiak, Alaska. On 14 April 1945, she left Kodiak for Cold Bay, where she arrived on 15 April 1945. She began shakedown training with her new Soviet Navy crew on 24 April 1945, which was completed on 13 May 1945.

=== Soviet Navy, 1945-1960 ===
Following the completion of training for her Soviet crew, Rampart was decommissioned on 21 May 1945 at Cold Bay and transferred to the Soviet Union under Lend-Lease immediately. Also commissioned into the Soviet Navy immediately, she was designated as a tralshik ("minesweeper") and renamed T-282 in Soviet service. She soon departed Cold Bay bound for Petropavlovsk-Kamchatsky in the Soviet Union, where she served in the Soviet Far East.

In February 1946, the United States began negotiations for the return of ships loaned to the Soviet Union for use during World War II, and on 8 May 1947, United States Secretary of the Navy James V. Forrestal informed the United States Department of State that the United States Department of the Navy wanted 480 of the 585 combatant ships it had transferred to the Soviet Union for World War II use returned. Deteriorating relations between the two countries as the Cold War broke out led to protracted negotiations over the ships, and by the mid-1950s the U.S. Navy found it too expensive to bring home ships that had become worthless to it anyway. Many ex-American ships were merely administratively "returned" to the United States and instead sold for scrap in the Soviet Union, while the U.S. Navy did not seriously pursue the return of others because it viewed them as no longer worth the cost of recovery. The Soviets converted T-282 into a naval trawler in 1948 and renamed her Shkval, and never returned her to the United States, although the U.S. Navy reclassified her as a "fleet minesweeper" (MSF) and redesignated her MSF-282 on 7 February 1955.

== Disposal ==
The ship was scrapped in 1960. Unaware of her fate, the U.S. Navy kept Rampart on its Naval Vessel Register until finally striking her on 1 January 1983.
