= USS Hazard =

Minesweeper of the United States Navy

USS Hazard (AM-240)
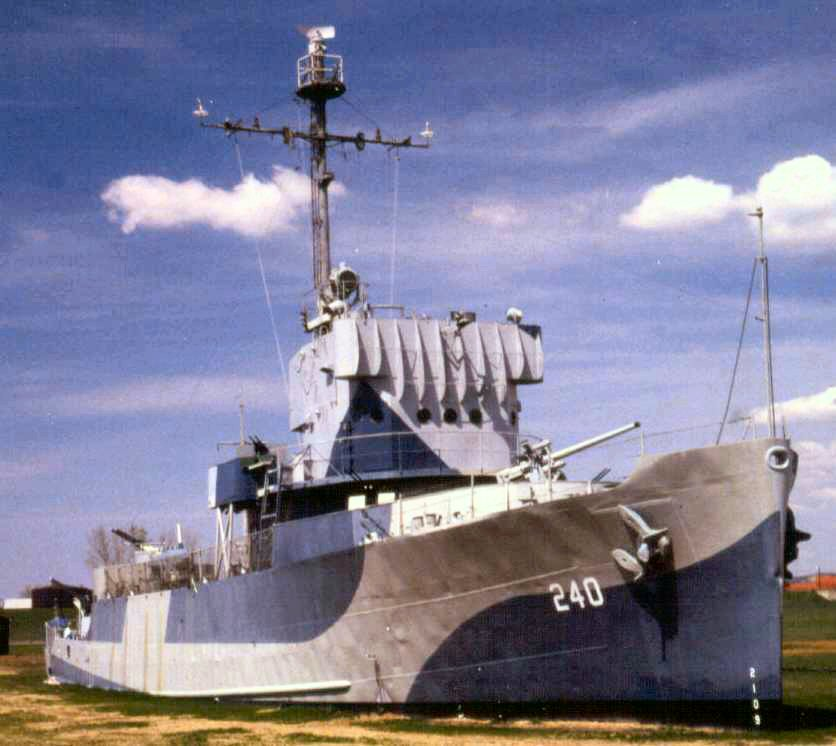
- USS Hazard at Freedom Park in Omaha, Nebraska.

History

United States
- Name: Hazard
- Builder: Winslow Marine Railway & Shipbuilding Company
- Laid down: 1944
- Launched: 21 May 1944
- Commissioned: 21 October 1944
- Decommissioned: 27 July 1946
- Reclassified: MSF-240 7 February 1955
- Stricken: 1971
- Motto: No Sweep, No Invasion
- Honors and awards: 3 Battle Stars
- Status: Museum ship since 1971 at Freedom Park, Omaha, Nebraska

General characteristics
- Class & type: Admirable-class minesweeper
- Displacement: 530 tons
- Length: 184 ft 6 in (56.24 m)
- Beam: 33 ft (10 m)
- Draft: 9 ft 9 in (2.97 m)
- Propulsion: Two 1,710 shp (1,280 kW) Cooper Bessemer GSB-8 diesel engines, National Supply Co. single reduction gear, two shafts.
- Speed: 15 knots (27.8 km/h)
- Complement: 104
- Armament: 1 × 3"/50 caliber gun; 6 × Oerlikon 20 mm cannon; 4 × Bofors 40 mm guns (2×2); 2 × Depth charge projectors (K-guns); 2 × Depth charge tracks

Service record
- Awards: 3 Battle stars
- USS Hazard (AM-240)
- U.S. National Register of Historic Places
- U.S. National Historic Landmark
- Location within Nebraska
- Coordinates: 41°16′37″N 95°54′6″W
- Built: 1944
- Architect: Winslow Marine Railway
- NRHP reference No.: 79003712

Significant dates
- Added to NRHP: 1 January 1979
- Designated NHL: January 14, 1986

USS Hazard (AM-240) is an Admirable-class minesweeper that served in the United States Navy during World War II.

== Service history ==
Hazard was launched on 1 October 1944 and was commissioned on 30 December 1944. The vessel was built by the Winslow Marine Railway and Shipbuilding Company of Winslow, Washington. Hazard was fitted for both wire and acoustic sweeping and could double as an anti-submarine warfare platform. The Admirable class of minesweepers were also used for patrol and escort duties.

Hazard first served in this capacity, escorting a convoy from San Francisco to Pearl Harbor, and then running with convoys to Eniwetok and Ulithi. In March 1945, the minesweeper was sent to Okinawa, where she first performed anti-submarine patrols before sweeping the waters off Kerama Retto in keeping with the minesweeper's slogan, "No Sweep, No Invasion."

At the war's end the ship cleared the seas off Korea and Japan for the occupation forces.

Returning to the United States in 1946, Hazard was decommissioned and joined the reserve fleet. Stricken from the Navy Register in 1971, Hazard was purchased by a group of Omaha, Nebraska businessmen and placed on public display. Her paint job has since been restored to the camouflage paint she had during World War II. She is open to the public along with the submarine USS Marlin, an A-4 Skyhawk, an A-7 Corsair II, and an HH-52A Seaguard US Coast Guard helicopter at Freedom Park on the Missouri River waterfront in East Omaha.

Hazard earned three battle stars for her World War II service.

Hazard is a National Historic Landmark, the only Admirable-class minesweeper left in the United States. Her sister ship, USS Inaugural was a museum ship in St. Louis until she was destroyed in the Great Flood of 1993.

== See also ==
- List of Admirable class minesweepers
