= USS Inaugural =

Minesweeper of the United States Navy

Coordinates: 38.611483°N 90.188101°W

USS Inaugural (AM-242)
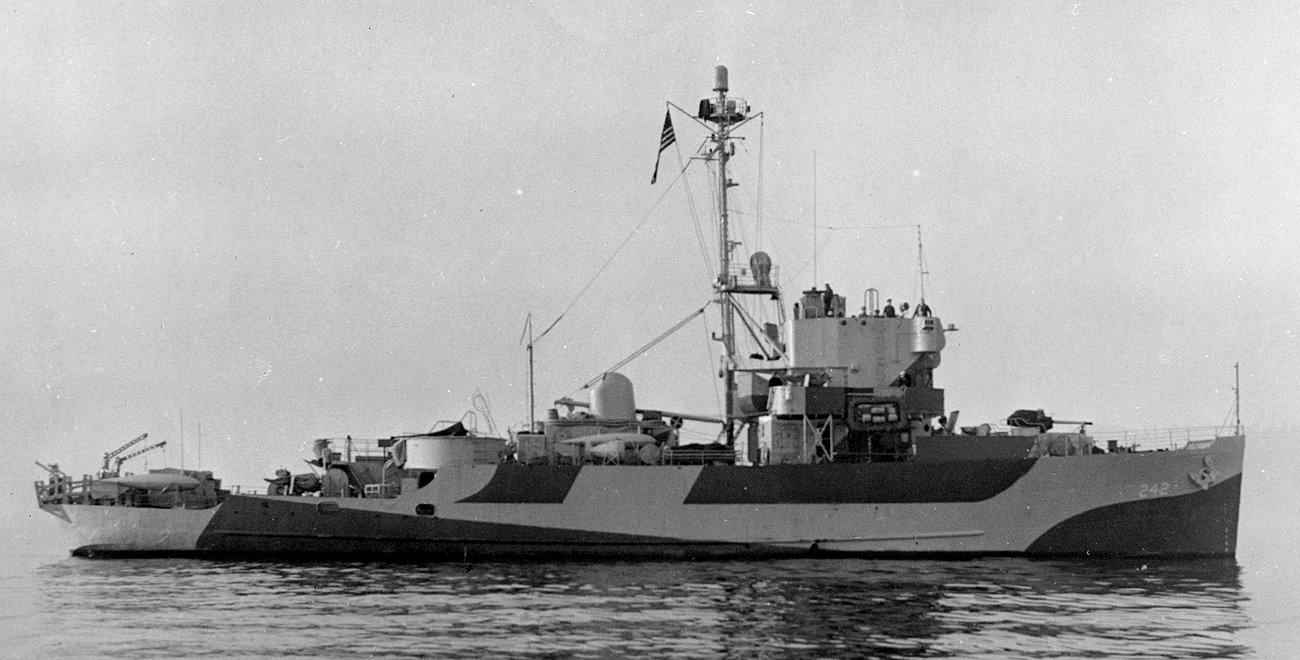
- USS Inaugural (in dazzle camouflage) during World War II

History

United States
- Builder: Winslow Marine Railway & Shipbuilding Company
- Laid down: 22 May 1944
- Launched: 1 October 1944
- Commissioned: 30 December 1944
- Decommissioned: 9 September 1946
- Reclassified: MSF-242, 7 February 1955
- Stricken: 1 March 1967
- Fate: Sold 1968 as a floating museum in St. Louis.; Sunk in the Great Flood of 1993.

General characteristics
- Class & type: Admirable-class minesweeper
- Displacement: 530 tons
- Length: 184 ft 6 in (56.24 m)
- Beam: 33 ft (10 m)
- Draft: 9 ft 9 in (2.97 m)
- Speed: 15 knots (27.8 km/h)
- Complement: 104
- Armament: 1 × 3"/50 caliber gun; 6 × Oerlikon 20 mm cannon; 4 × Bofors 40 mm guns (2×2); 2 × Depth charge projectors (K-guns); 2 × Depth charge tracks

Service record
- Part of: US Pacific Fleet (1944-1946); Atlantic Reserve Fleet (1946-1967)
- Operations: Battle of Okinawa
- Awards: 2 Battle stars

USS Inaugural (AM-242) was an Admirable-class fleet minesweeper. The Admirable class was the largest and one of the most successful classes of U.S. minesweepers ordered during World War II. Inaugural was launched on 1 October 1944 and commissioned less than three months later. After seeing combat in the Pacific Theater, she was decommissioned in 1946 and spent two decades in mothballs.

In 1968, she was set up as a museum ship in St. Louis, Missouri. In the Great Flood of 1993, Inaugural was ripped from her mooring, ran aground, and rolled on her side a mile downstream. As of December 2017, the hulk was still sitting on the Missouri side of the river. In the autumn of 2021, a historic low level of the Mississippi River allowed the hulk to become visible.

== Operations ==
Inaugural was built and launched by the Winslow Marine Railway and Shipbuilding Company of Winslow, Washington. She was commissioned on 30 December 1944.

Following shakedown off the California coast, Inaugural sailed on 14 March 1945 for Pearl Harbor, where she arrived eight days later. For the next two months, the minesweeper performed patrol and escort duties between Hawaii and the islands of the western Pacific. She was at Saipan on 22 May and departed that day with a convoy bound for Okinawa, site of the last and largest amphibious operation of the Pacific war. After a voyage enlivened by several attacks on suspected submarines, the convoy reached Okinawa on 30 May.

During the desperate struggle for Okinawa, Inaugural patrolled the seas around the island group, often firing at Japanese aircraft as they made suicidal efforts to destroy the ships supporting the invasion force. Except for 19–24 July, when the ship put to sea to ride out the great typhoon, Inaugural remained in the dangerous waters around Okinawa until 30 August 1945.

With the war over, she steamed to the waters around Japan and Korea for minesweeping operations that were a necessary prelude to occupation. She swept the approaches to Jinsen, Korea, in September, and later cleared mines in waters off Nagasaki and Sasebo, Japan. Inaugural proceeded to Okinawa where she received needed equipment from 14 to 24 October, and then returned to minesweeping around the Japanese home islands.

The minesweeper sailed on 24 December for the United States, via Saipan and Pearl Harbor, and arrived at San Pedro, California, on 7 February 1946. Sailing again on 11 March, she proceeded to Galveston, Texas, and decommissioned there on 9 September 1946. She was reclassified MSF-242 on 7 February 1955. Inaugural entered the Atlantic Reserve Fleet, Texas Group, where she remained until struck from the Navy List on 1 March 1967 and sold.

Overall, Inaugural cleared 82 mines and was awarded two battle stars for service during World War II.

== Museum ship ==
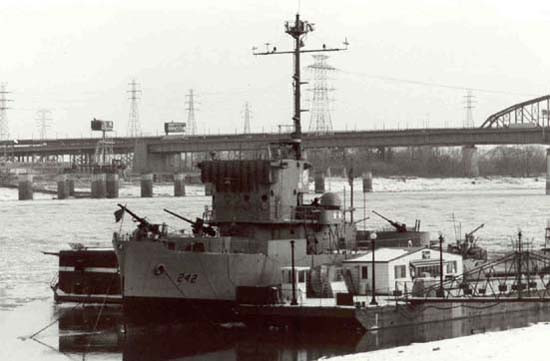
After decommissioning, USS Inaugural became a museum at St. Louis

In 1968, Inaugural was towed to St. Louis and established as a floating museum. The vessel was designated as a National Historic Landmark on 14 January 1986, as one of two surviving Admirable-class minesweepers used in the Pacific during World War II, the other being the USS Hazard.

On 1 August 1993, during flooding of the Mississippi River, Inaugural broke loose from her moorings at the Gateway Arch. The ship suffered a breach in her hull, took on water, and rolled on her port side. She sank on the Missouri side of the river, half a mile south of the Poplar Street Bridge. She has since remained in that position, partially submerged.

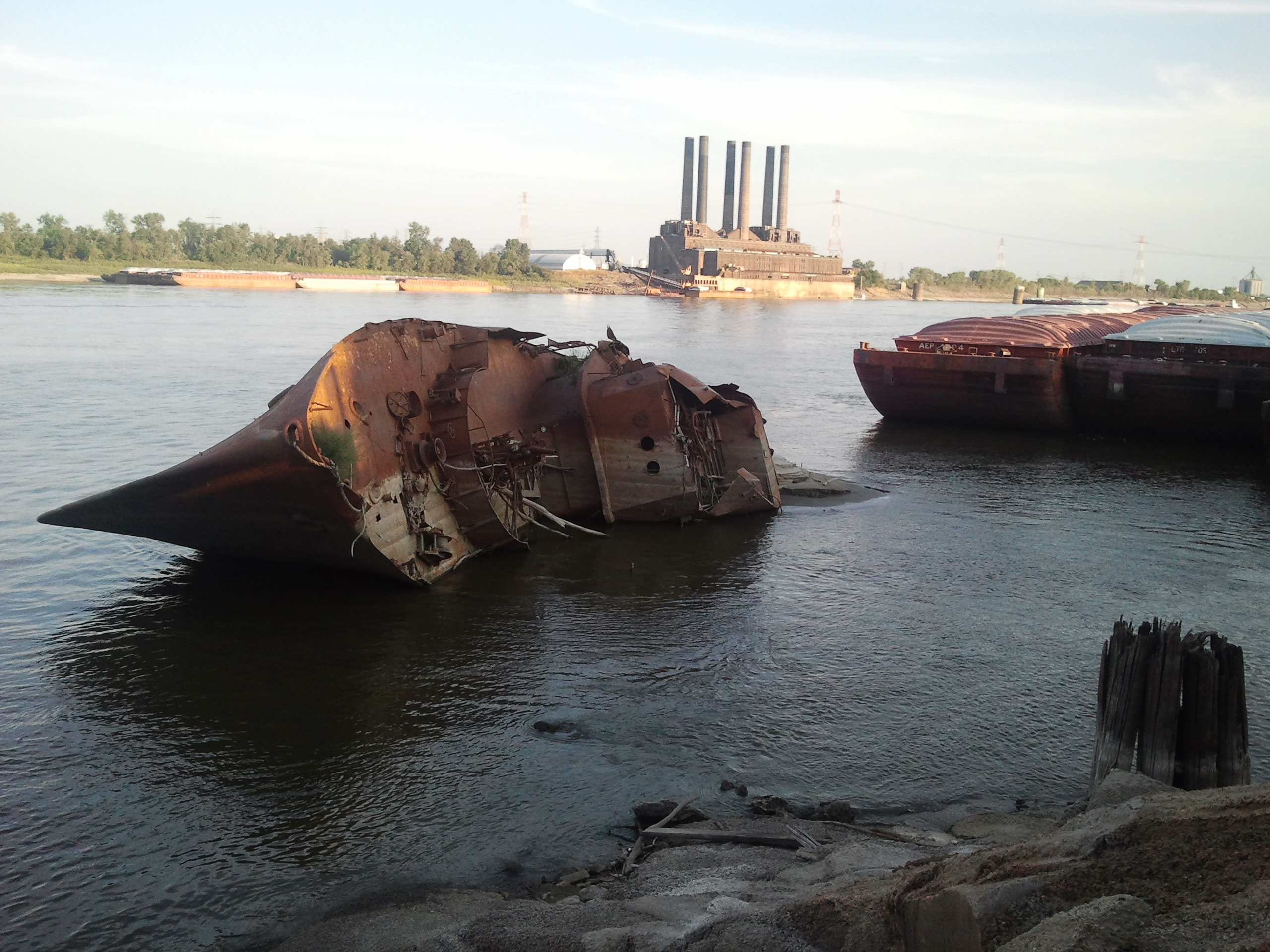
USS Inaugural in August 2012

Plans to salvage the wreck in one piece and restore it were deemed unfeasible. The ship was determined a total loss. Inaugural's Landmark designation was withdrawn on 7 August 2001, because she had ceased to meet the criteria. In January 2013, the river dropped so low that one may walk up to the ship. Scrapping work was set to begin in January, but river levels rose again. She is still in the same location with a few pieces of metal missing from the start of scrapping. As of October 2021, she is still sitting where she came to rest and can be seen when the river is at or below average level.

== See also ==
- List of U.S. National Historic Landmark ships, shipwrecks, and shipyards
