= USS Fixity =

Minesweeper of the United States Navy

Coordinates: 38.660833°N 83.776944°W

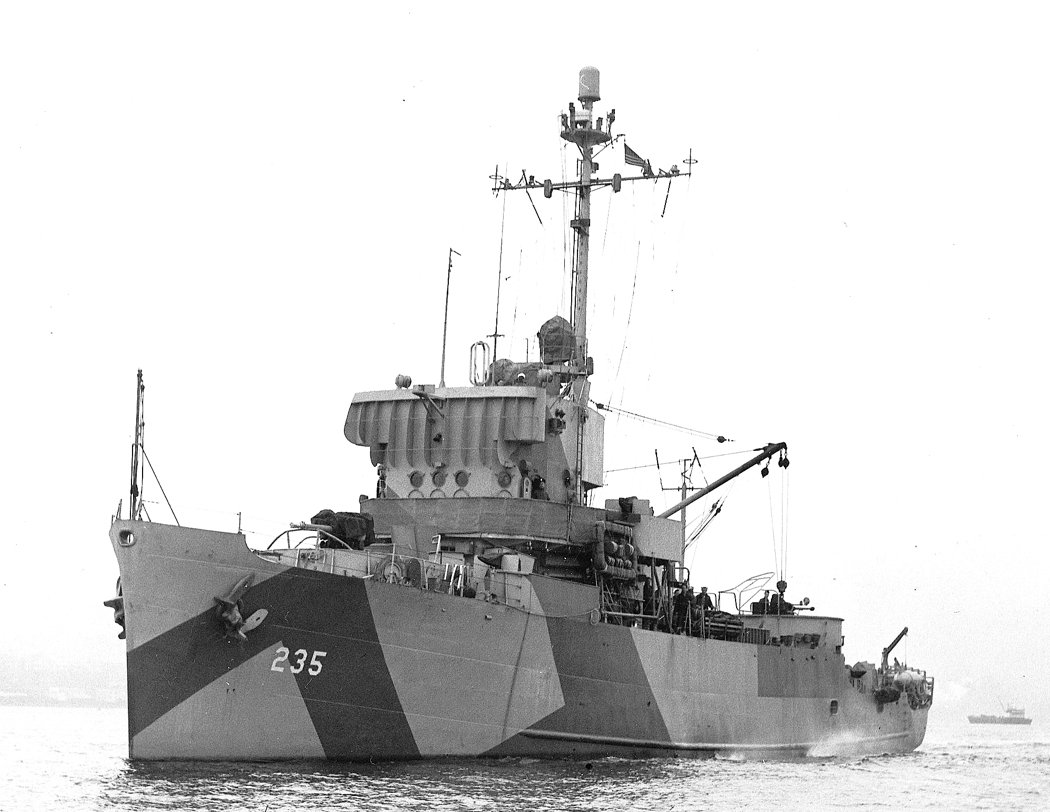
- Fixity at Seattle, January 1945

History

United States
- Name: USS PCE-908
- Builder: Puget Sound Bridge and Dredging Company, Seattle
- Laid down: 12 May 1944
- Renamed: USS Fixity (AM 235)
- Launched: 4 September 1944
- Sponsored by: Mrs. P. J. Toien
- Commissioned: 29 December 1944
- Decommissioned: 6 November 1946
- Fate: transferred to Maritime Commission, 23 January 1948; sold into merchant service, 1949

General characteristics
- Class & type: PCE-905-class patrol craft
- Class & type: Admirable-class minesweeper, September 1943
- Displacement: 650 long tons (660 t)
- Length: 184 ft 6 in (56.24 m)
- Beam: 33 ft (10 m)
- Draft: 9 ft 9 in (2.97 m)
- Propulsion: 2 × ALCO 539 diesel engines, 1,710 shp (1,280 kW); Farrel-Birmingham single reduction gear; 2 shafts
- Speed: 15 knots (28 km/h)
- Complement: 104
- Armament: 1 × 3"/50 caliber (76 mm) DP gun; 2 × twin Bofors 40 mm guns; 1 × Hedgehog anti-submarine mortar; 2 × Depth charge tracks

Service record
- Part of: U.S. Pacific Fleet (1944–1946)
- Awards: 2 Battle stars

USS Fixity (AM-235) was an Admirable-class minesweeper built for the United States Navy during World War II. The ship was ordered and laid down as PCE-905-class patrol craft USS PCE-908 but was renamed and reclassified before her December 1944 commissioning as Fixity (AM-235). She earned two battle stars in service in the Pacific during the war. She was decommissioned in November 1946 and placed in reserve. In January 1948, she was transferred to the United States Maritime Commission, which sold her into merchant service in 1949. Operating as the Commercial Dixie, she sank in the Ohio River in the late 1990s.

== Career ==
Originally named PCE-908, the ship was launched on 4 September 1944 by Puget Sound Bridge and Dredging Company, Seattle, Washington; sponsored by Mrs. P. J. Toien; and commissioned on 29 December 1944.

Sailing from San Pedro, California, on 4 March 1945, Fixity trained in the Hawaiian Islands for the rest of the month, then crossed the Pacific on convoy escort duty to Eniwetok, Ulithi, and Okinawa. From her arrival there on 16 May, Fixity took station in the inner screen protecting the masses of shipping at the island, on 22 June driving off a lone Japanese airplane which attempted to attack her. She served on patrol and escort at Okinawa until 30 August, then began minesweeping operations off Korea, concentrating on the approaches to Jinsen. On 8 September, she rendezvoused with the amphibious force bringing troops to occupy Jinsen, into which she accompanied them.

Fixity arrived at Sasebo on 10 September 1945, and was based there for sweeping operations in Japanese waters until February 1946, when she sailed for the west coast and inactivation. She was decommissioned at Bremerton, Washington, on 6 November 1946, and transferred to the Maritime Commission on 23 January 1948.

She was sold to the Jeffersonville Boat and Machine Co. of Jeffersonville, Indiana and converted to river service in 1949 at Paducah Marine Ways, Paducah, Kentucky, and renamed M/V Commercial Dixie. She was later sold to the Cincinnati Marine Service of Covington, Ohio. She sank in Ohio River at Maysville, Kentucky late 1990s.

Fixity received two battle stars for World War II service.
