= USS Superior (AM-311) =

Minesweeper of the United States Navy

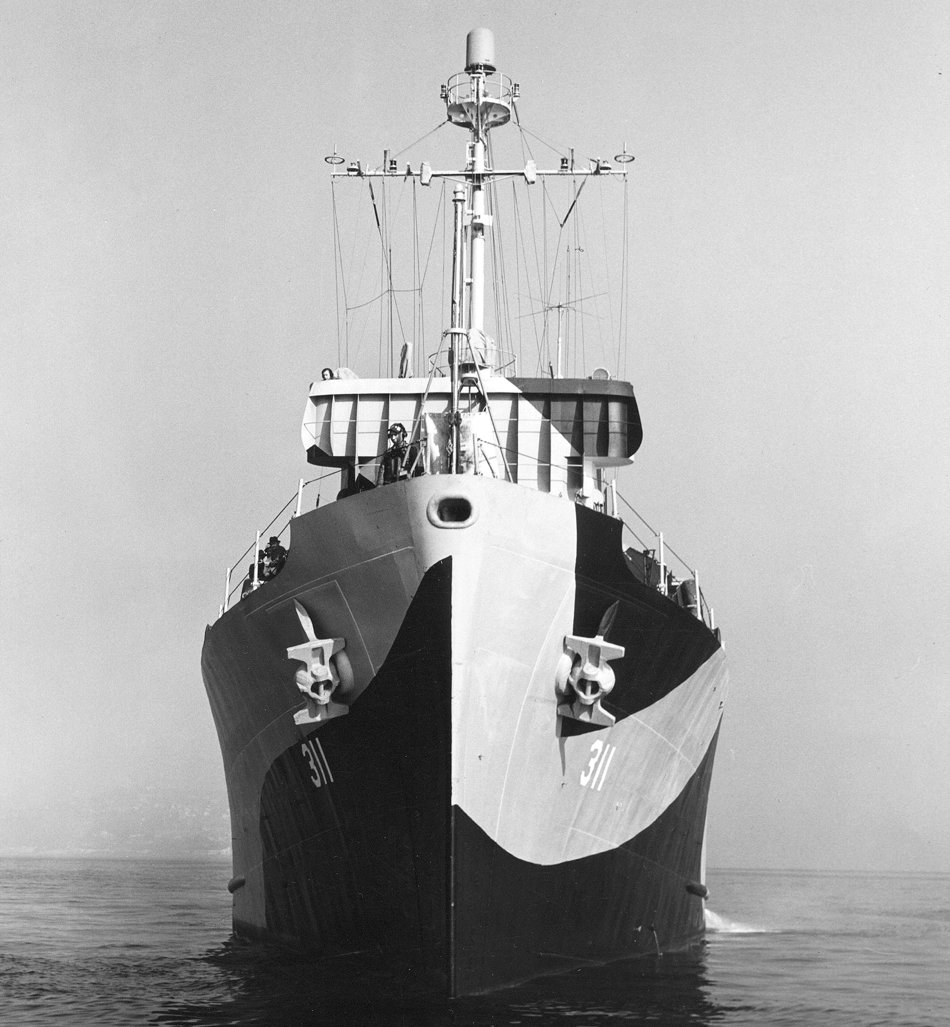
- Superior near Seattle on 27 October 1944

History

United States
- Name: USS Superior
- Builder: Associated Shipbuilders
- Laid down: 18 February 1944
- Launched: 11 May 1944
- Commissioned: 1 November 1944
- Decommissioned: July 1947
- Reclassified: MSF-311, 7 February 1955
- Stricken: 1 July 1972
- Fate: Sold for scrap

General characteristics
- Class & type: Admirable-class minesweeper
- Displacement: 650 tons; 945 tons (full load)
- Length: 184 ft 6 in (56.24 m)
- Beam: 33 ft (10 m)
- Draft: 9 ft 9 in (2.97 m)
- Propulsion: 2 × 1,710 shp Cooper Bessemer GSB-8 diesel engines; National Supply Co. single reduction gear; 2 shafts
- Speed: 14.8 knots (27.4 km/h)
- Complement: 104
- Armament: 1 × 3"/50 caliber gun DP; 1 × twin Bofors 40 mm guns; 6 × Oerlikon 20 mm cannon; 1 × Hedgehog anti-submarine mortar; 4 × Depth charge projectors (K-guns); 2 × Depth charge racks

Service record
- Part of: US Pacific Fleet (1944-1946); Atlantic Reserve Fleet (1946-1972)
- Awards: 3 Battle stars

USS Superior (AM-311) was a steel-hulled Admirable-class minesweeper built for the U.S. Navy in 1944. Superior participated in the final struggle in the Pacific Ocean against the Empire of Japan during the end of World War II and remained behind, after the war ended, to clear minefields laid during the war.

Superior was laid down on 18 February 1944 by Associated Shipbuilders, Seattle, Washington, launched on 11 May 1944, sponsored by Mrs. L. H. Lyon; and commissioned on 1 November 1944.

== World War II Pacific Theatre operations ==
Superior completed fitting out at Seattle, Washington, and then moved down the coast to San Pedro, California, for her shakedown cruise, and then on to San Diego, California, for sound training. She returned to San Pedro on 26 December 1944, and sailed from there, on 3 January 1945, for Hawaii. The minesweeper arrived there ten days later and sailed for Eniwetok on 19 January, as a convoy escort. She returned to Pearl Harbor and escorted another convoy EUK-19, to Eniwetok.

Superior stood out of Eniwetok on 3 March, en route to Ulithi where she and Mine Group 2 (MinGru 2) completed final staging for the Ryukyu Islands operation. Superior began sweeping mines off Kerama Retto on 25 March. She remained at Okinawa, clearing mines and performing patrol duty until 5 May when she sailed for Ulithi. Superior joined another Okinawa-bound convoy and escorted it there on 27 May. She operated from Kerama Retto for the next several months, sweeping mines in the East China Sea.

== Post-War operations ==
In September, Superior aided in clearing Sasebo Bay and the Tsushima Strait area. The following month she swept the Higashi Channel area off Kyūshū. The ship cleared Sasebo on 10 December 1945 en route to the United States, via Eniwetok and Pearl Harbor.

== Post-War Deactivation ==
Superior arrived at San Diego, California, on 12 January 1946 and sailed for Galveston, Texas, the following week. She arrived there on 3 February and was ordered inactivated. The minesweeper moved to Orange, Texas, on 22 May and joined the 16th Fleet in commission, in reserve. In February 1947 her status was changed to out of commission, in reserve. Superior was reclassified as a steel-hulled fleet minesweeper, MSF-311, on 7 February 1955. She was struck from the Navy list on 1 July 1972.

== Awards ==
Superior received three battle stars for World War II service.
