= Puget Sound Bridge and Dredging Company =

Shipbuilding company

- Founded: 1898
- Fate: Acquired by Lockheed Martin in 1959
- Successor: Lockheed Shipbuilding and Construction Company

Puget Sound Bridge and Dredging Company was a major shipbuilding and construction company, located in Seattle, Washington, on the southwestern corner of Harbor Island, an artificial island in Elliott Bay. The Bridge and Dredging Company created the island, completing its construction in 1909. It established itself in 1898 and engaged in construction projects around the United States and shipbuilding for the U.S. Navy during and after World War II. During the war it also operated under the name Associated Shipbuilders in a joint venture with the nearby Lake Union Dry Dock Company. In 1959 Lockheed purchased the shipyard and it became the Lockheed Shipbuilding and Construction Company. The Yard was permanently closed in 1987.

== Construction and shipbuilding ==
During its 61-year history as Puget Sound Bridge and Dredging Company, the firm completed many major construction projects.

=== Ships ===
- The Governor Pingree was the company’s first vessel built, in 1898. The ship was a 140-foot, flat-bottomed stern-wheeler built for use in the Yukon gold trade.
- Two 5,400-ton steam-driven, wooden cargo vessels: Broxton and Snoqualmie (1918). Originally built for service in World War I but completed too late for war service. Later served in Pacific trade between British Columbia and Australia.
- More than 2,000 vessels and 100 steel ships for the U.S. Navy during and after World War II. One of the notable Navy ships built by Puget Sound was the USS Turner Joy, one of two U.S. Navy destroyers involved in the Gulf of Tonkin Incident in 1964.
- Several large ferries for the Washington State Ferry System

==== World War II List of Ships ====
- 4 of 30 Barnegat-class seaplane tenders
  - Rockaway (AVP-29) ... Yakutat (AVP-32)
- 14 of 123 Admirable-class minesweepers
  - Signet (AM-302) ... Superior (AM-311)
  - Execute (AM-232) ... Fixity (AM-235)
- 16 of 95 Auk-class minesweepers
  - USS Spear (AM-322) ... USS Vigilance (AM-324)
  - HMS Catherine(BAM-9) ... HMS Elfreda(BAM-16)
  - HMS Fairy(BAM-25) ... HMS Garnet(BAM-29)
- 3 Tugs
- 25 Barges

=== Other constructions ===
- Harbor Island in Seattle (1909). Until 1938, it was the largest artificial island in the world, and is still the largest artificial island in the United States.
- A large system of irrigation canals known as the Umatilla Project in northwestern Oregon (1906)
- The original 5-story King County courthouse in Seattle (1914)
- Husky Stadium at the University of Washington in Seattle (1920)
- Construction of a large dam for "Lake Dallas" in Denton County, Texas (1924)
- The harbor of Port Townsend, Washington (1931)
- The first Lake Washington Floating Bridge (1940)
- Rebuilding railroad locomotives (1949–52)
- The first Hood Canal Floating Bridge (1961)

== See also ==
- List of structures on Elliott Bay
