= Admirable-class minesweeper =

Class of United States Navy minesweeper ships

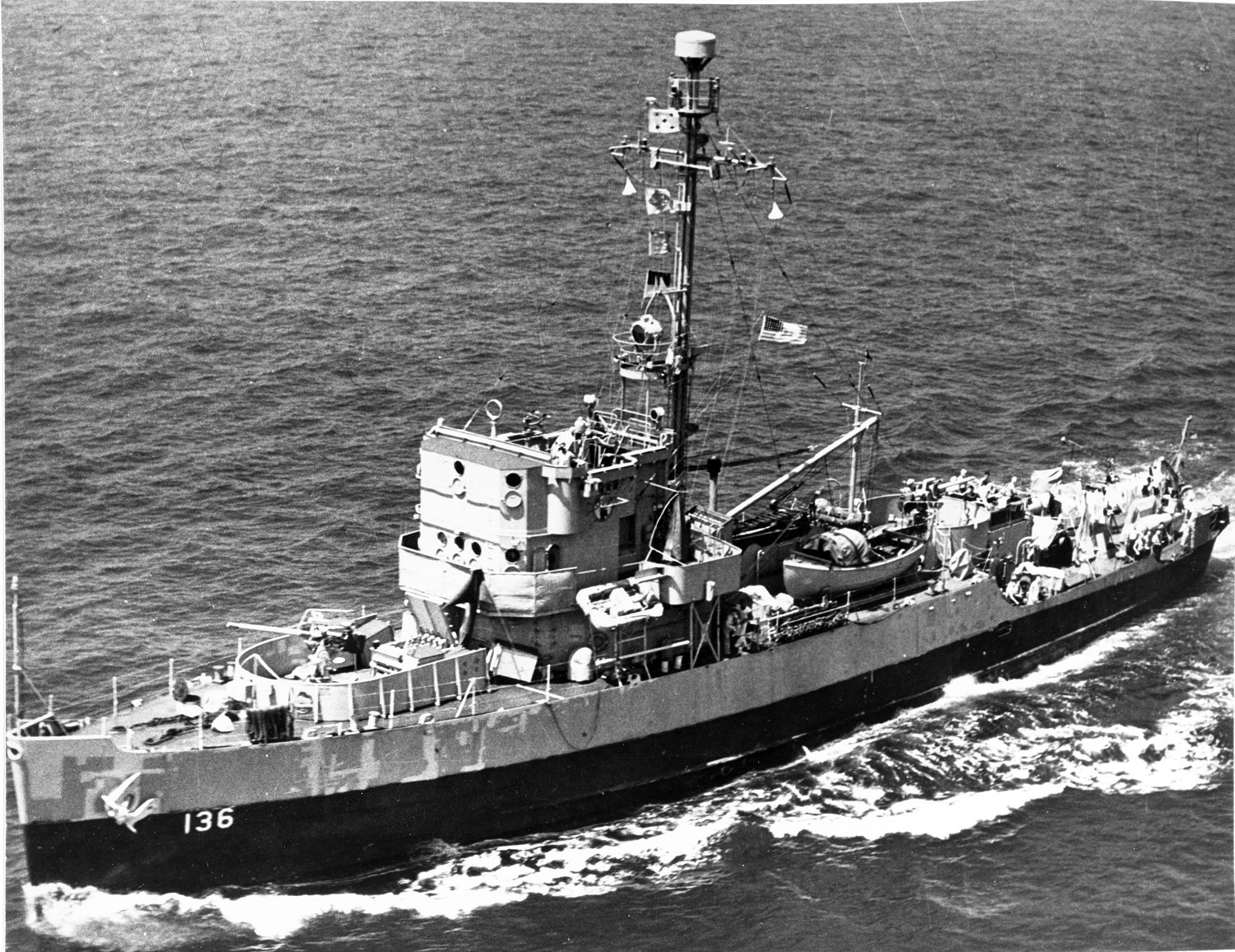
- USS Admirable under way, ca. 1944.

Class overview
- Builders: (8 companies in 8 states)
- Operators: World War II; United States Navy; Soviet Navy; Post-War; Republic of China Navy; Dominican Navy; Republic of Korea Navy; Mexican Navy; Myanmar Navy; Philippine Navy; Republic of Vietnam Navy; United States Navy; Soviet Navy; (Taiwan) Chinese Maritime Customs Service
- Preceded by: Hawk class
- Succeeded by: Agile class
- Planned: 147
- Completed: 123
- Canceled: 24
- Preserved: 1

General characteristics
- Type: Minesweeper
- Displacement: 625 tons
- Length: 184 ft 6 in (56.24 m)
- Beam: 33 ft (10 m)
- Draft: 10 ft (3.0 m)
- Propulsion: 2 × 855shp diesel engines, single reduction gear, 2 shafts
- Speed: 15 knots (28 km/h; 17 mph)
- Complement: 104 officers and men
- Armament: 1 × 3"/50 caliber gun; 4 × Bofors 40 mm Automatic Gun L/60; 6 × Oerlikon 20 mm cannon; 1 × Hedgehog anti-submarine mortar; 4 × Depth charge projectors; 2 × Depth charge racks; 2 × minesweeping paravanes

The Admirable class was one of the largest and most successful classes of minesweepers ordered by the United States Navy during World War II. Typically, minesweepers detected and removed naval mines before the rest of the fleet arrived, thereby ensuring safe passage for the larger ships. They were also charged with anti-submarine warfare (ASW) duties with rear-mounted depth charge racks and a forward-firing Hedgehog antisubmarine mortar. Their job was essential to the safety and success of U.S. naval operations during World War II and the Korean War. These minesweepers were also employed as patrol vessel and convoy escorts. The only remaining ship of this class is located at Freedom Park, Omaha, NE.

The PCE-842-class of patrol craft escorts was based on the Admirable-class design.

== Service in other Navies ==
As a part of Project Hula – a secret 1945 program that transferred 149 U.S. Navy ships to the Soviet Navy at Cold Bay, Territory of Alaska, in anticipation of the Soviet Union joining the war against Japan – the U.S. Navy transferred 24 Admirable-class minesweepers to the Soviet Navy between May and August 1945. At least some of them saw action in the Soviet offensive against Japanese forces in Northeast Asia in August 1945. The Soviet Union never returned them to the United States.

After World War II, the United States transferred Admirable-class minesweepers to the Republic of China Navy, the Republic of China's Chinese Maritime Customs Service, the Republic of Korea Navy, the Republic of Vietnam Navy, and the Dominican, Mexican, Myanmar, and Philippine navies.

USS Hazard survives as a museum ship on dry land in Omaha, Nebraska. USS Inaugural was a museum ship on the Mississippi River in St. Louis, until she sank during the Great Flood of 1993. USS Scuffle was scuttled off the coast of Cozumel, Mexico in 1999. It is now a popular site for scuba diving.

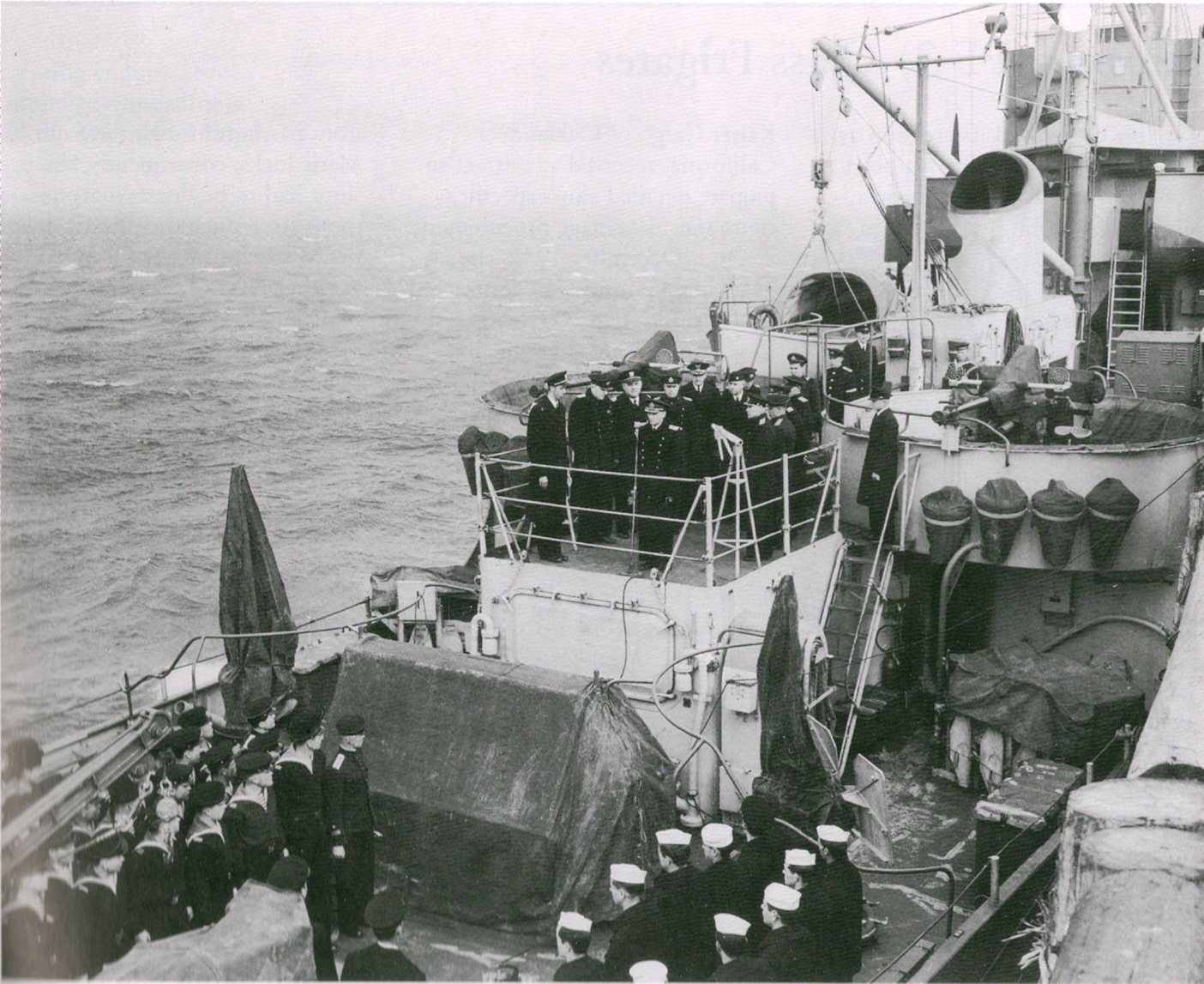
Soviet Navy Rear Admiral Boris Dmitrievich Popov, commander of the 5th Independent Brigade of Soviet Navy Ships at Cold Bay, Territory of Alaska, speaks aboard an unidentified Admirable-class minesweeper at Cold Bay on 21 or 22 May 1945 during the ceremony transferring the ship from the United States Navy to the Soviet Navy in the secret Project Hula training-and-transfer program.

== Production ==
- Tampa Shipbuilding Company, Tampa, FL (24)
  - Admirable (AM-136) ... Bombard (AM-151)
  - Crag (AM-214) ... Diploma (AM-221)
- Willamette Iron and Steel Works, Portland, OR (23)
  - Bond (Am-152) ... Counsel (AM-165)
  - Creddock (AM-356), Dipper (AM-357), Drake (AM-359)
  - Dunlin (AM-361) ... Harrier (AM-366)
- Savannah Machine & Foundry, GA (9)
  - Implicit (AM-246) ... Invade (AM-254)
- Winslow Marine Railway and Shipbuilding Company, Puget Sound, WA (13)
  - Garland (AM-238) ... Inaugural (AM-242)
  - Salute (AM-294) ... Shelter (AM-301)
- Gulf Shipbuilding Madisonville, LA (16)
  - Notable (AM-267) ... Rampart (AM-282)
- General Engineering & Dry Dock Company, Alameda, CA (7)
  - Ransom (AM-283) ... Report (AM-289)
- Associated Shipbuilders, Puget Sound, WA (14)
  - Signet (AM-302) ... Superior (AM-311)
  - Execute (AM-232) ... Fixity (AM-235)
- American Ship Building Company, Lorain, OH (17)
  - Jubilant (AM-255) ... Nimble (AM-266)
  - Disdain (AM-222) ... Embattle (AM-226)

== Engines ==
- Two 855shp ALCO 539 diesel engines, Farrel-Birmingham single reduction gear, two shafts. (30)
  - AM-136 ... AM-165
- Two 855shp Cooper Bessemer GSB-8 diesel engines, National Supply Co. single reduction gear, two shafts (84)
  - AM-214 ... AM-226, AM-232 ... AM-235, AM-240 ... AM-242
  - AM-246 ... AM-291, AM-294 ... AM-311
- Two 855shp Busch-Sulzer 539 diesel engines, Farrel Birmingham single reduction gear, two shafts (9)
  - AM-356, AM-357, AM-359, AM-361 ... AM-366
- ref:

== See also ==
- List of Admirable-class minesweepers
- Auk-class minesweeper
