= SS Sweepstakes =

SS Sweepstakes may refer to:

- SS Sweepstakes (1940), a Type C2 ship laid down by Tampa Shipbuilding as Sweepstakes; transferred to the United States Navy in 1940 as the Arcturus-class attack cargo ship named USS Procyon (AKA-2); broken up in 1971
- SS Sweepstakes (1944), a Type C2-S-AJ1 ship built by North Carolina Shipbuilding; renamed Elizabeth (1947), Adams (1963), and Southport II (1963); broken up in 1969
