= Culbreath =

Culbreath may refer to:

People:

- Jim Culbreath (born 1952), former American football running back
- John R. Culbreath (1926–2013), American politician
- Jordan Culbreath, former running back
- Josh Culbreath (1932–2021), American athlete
- Joy Culbreath (born 1939), Native American educator
- Lynn Culbreath Noel (born 1926), African-American news reporter
- Montrell Culbreath (born 2007), German footballer
- Oamo Culbreath (born 1987), professional Canadian football offensive lineman

Places:

- Culbreath Bayou, neighborhood within the city limits of Tampa, Florida
- Culbreath Isles, neighborhood within the South Tampa district of Tampa

Ships:

- SS Harry Culbreath
- SS Harry Culbreath (1942)
