= SS Mormacwren =

Three ships of Moore-McCormack have borne the name Mormacwren

- MS Mormacwren was launched in 1939 as a diesel powered Type C2 ship. She was acquired by the US Navy in 1941 as an Arcturus-class attack cargo ship and renamed USS Algorab. She was decommissioned in 1946 and sold into civilian service in 1947 as the Kamran. She was renamed Mongola in 1948, Hellenic Sailor in 1954 and was scrapped in 1973.
- SS Mormacwren was launched 22 May 1942 at the Consolidated Steel Corporation's Wilmington, California yard as a Type C1-B ship. She was completed as a troop transport and transferred to the United States Maritime Commission in 1946. She was scrapped in 1965.
- SS Mormacwren was launched in 1944 as a Type C2-S-B1 ship named Eagle Wing. She was purchased and renamed Mormacwren in 1947 and was sold in 1965 and renamed East Hills. She was scrapped in 1969.
