= SS Mormachawk =

Three ships of Moore-McCormack have borne the name Mormachawk

- SS Mormachawk (1939) was launched in 1939 as a Type C2 ship. She was acquired by the US Navy in 1941 as an Arcturus-class attack cargo ship and renamed USS Arcturus. She was decommissioned in 1946 and sold into civilian service in 1947 as the Star Arcturus. She was scrapped in 1971.
- SS Mormachawk (1942) was launched in 1942 as a Type C1-B ship. She was completed as a troop transport and transferred to the United States Maritime Commission in 1946. She was scrapped in 1964.
- SS Mormachawk (1947) was launched in 1945 as Queen of the Seas. She was purchased and renamed Mormachawk in 1947, transferred to the National Defense Reserve Fleet in 1964 and was scrapped in 1968.
