= USS Algorab =

Cargo ship of the United States Navy

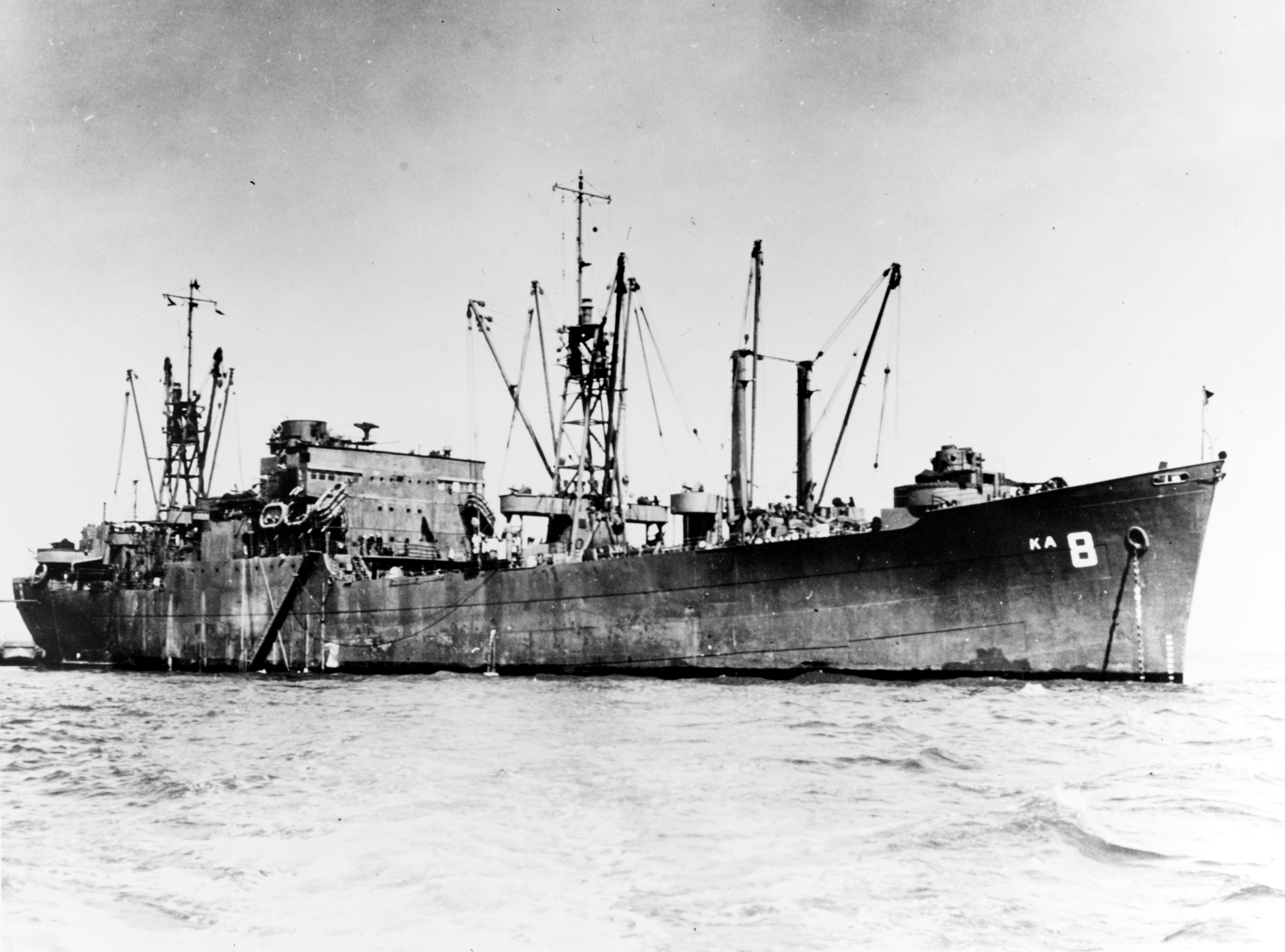
- USS Algorab in San Francisco, 1945/1946. Image shows the final configuration of the Arcturus class.

History

United States
- Name: Mormacwren; USS Algorab
- Namesake: Algorab, a star in the constellation Corvus
- Builder: Sun Shipbuilding & Drydock Co., Chester, Pennsylvania
- Laid down: 10 August 1938, as Mormacwren
- Launched: 15 June 1939
- Acquired: 6 June 1941
- Commissioned: 15 June 1941
- Decommissioned: 3 December 1945
- Reclassified: AKA-8 (attack cargo ship), 1 February 1943
- Stricken: 19 December 1945
- Honours and awards: 4 battle stars (World War II)
- Fate: Sold into merchant service, 3 April 1947; Scrapped, 1973
- Notes: U.S. Official number: 238889

General characteristics
- Class & type: Arcturus-class attack cargo ship
- Type: Type C2 ship
- Displacement: 14,225 long tons (14,453 t) full
- Length: 459 ft 1 in (139.93 m)
- Beam: 63 ft (19 m)
- Draft: 26 ft 5 in (8.05 m)
- Speed: 16.5 knots (30.6 km/h; 19.0 mph)
- Complement: 397
- Armament: 1 × 5-inch/38-caliber gun mount; 4 × twin 40 mm gun mounts; 18 × 20 mm gun mounts

USS Algorab (AKA-8) was laid down as Mormacwren, (Note: A second Mormacwren, U.S. O/N 242616, followed in 1942. It was a C1-B type completed 26 December 1942 and converted to a troop ship operated by Moore-McCormack Lines, Inc., for the War Shipping Administration. The MARAD Vessel Status Card for this ship is in the same URL location as for the earlier ship.) one of the earliest Maritime Commission-type C2 ships (MC hull 20), on 10 August 1938 by the Sun Shipbuilding & Drydock Co., Chester, Pennsylvania as hull 177 for Moore-McCormack. Mormacwren was acquired by the United States Navy 6 June 1941, commissioned 15 June 1941 as USS Algorab (AK-25) and was redesignated an attack transport on 1 February 1943 with the hull number chanted to AKA-8. Algorab decommissioned on 3 December 1945 and was delivered to the Maritime Commission on 30 June 1946 for disposal, purchased by Wallem & Co. on 4 April 1947 for commercial service.

Algorab served in the Atlantic with voyages to Iceland and the Caribbean until transporting Army troops to the Pacific in 1942 and remaining there with the exception of returning for the landings in North Africa.

== Construction and design ==
Mormacwren was one of six C2 type motor ships, the first being MS Donald McKay, built at Sun designed as 8,800 DWT cargo liners with capacity for twelve passengers in staterooms with bath and a design speed of 17 knots (20 mph; 31 km/h). (Note: The others of the group were Mormachawk which became USS Arcturus, Mormacgull / USS Alcyone, Mormacdove / USS Alchiba and Mormaclark / USS Betelgeuse.) Mormacwren was launched on 15 June 1939 sponsored by Miss Barbara Ann Moore, the fourteen-year-old daughter of Moore-McCormack Lines' President. (Note: DANFS has "sponsored by Miss Mary Aldrich" which may be the Navy renaming ceremony or a mistake. A prominent shipping industry journal in a contemporary piece is almost certainly accurate about the Mormacwren sponsor.)

The design specifications for the six ships were for length overall of 459 ft (139.9 m), length between perpendiculars 435 ft (132.6 m), molded beam of 63 feet (19.2 m), depth to shelter deck of 40 ft 6 in (12.3 m) and loaded draft of 25 ft 9 in (7.8 m). Cargo capacity was for 540,000 cubic feet (15,291.1 m^{3}) with loaded displacement of 13,900 long tons (14,123 t) and cargo deadweight of 7,613 long tons (7,735 t). With fuel capacity of 1,500 long tons (1,524 t) cruising range was approximately 20,000 miles (32,186.9 km) at a normal speed of 15.5 knots (28.7 km/h; 17.8 mph). The hull was a full shelter deck type with seven transverse water tight bulkheads, five holds, three forward and two aft of the engine spaces with 20 ft (6.1 m) by 30 ft (9.1 m) hatches except for #1 at 29 ft 3 in (8.9 m) in length and #3 which was 50 ft (15.2 m) in length. Holds were served by booms and 50-horsepower electric winches on six king posts. The four-story deck house had quarters for officers and six staterooms with private baths on the bridge deck for twelve passengers. Crew spaces were on the shelter deck level of the deck house.

Propulsion was by a direct connected, four cylinder, double opposed piston Sun-Doxford diesel developing 6,000 shaft horsepower at 92 revolutions on the single 20 ft (6.1 m) diameter, 21 ft (6.4 m) pitch screw. Piston bore was 32 in (0.8 m) and combined stroke of 95 in (2.4 m). At the time this was the most powerful marine diesel built in the United States and was capable of operating two hours under 25% overload for 7,500 horsepower. Exhaust heat, or oil for port or emergencies, drove a steam generator providing steam for cooking, heating and hot water services. Three 250-kilowatt diesel generators provided electrical service.

== Navy acquisition ==
On 4 June 1941 the Maritime Commission, Division of Emergency Shipping, announced negotiated acquisition of twenty-eight vessels of which twenty-one were to be turned over to the Navy, Mormacwren being one, and seven to be turned over to the Army. Mormacwren was delivered to the Navy on 6 June 1941 with conversions made at the Boston Navy Yard. On 15 June 1941 the ship was commissioned as USS Algorab (AK-25), named for a star in the constellation Corvus, at Boston, Massachusetts. On 1 February 1943 Algorab was reclassified as an Arcturus-class attack cargo ship attack cargo ship, hull number AKA-8. She served as a commissioned ship for 4 years and 5 months.

== Service history ==
=== 1941 ===
Following her commissioning, the cargo ship held shakedown along the East Coast. On 4 October, she proceeded to Little Placentia Harbor, Newfoundland. There she joined an Iceland-bound convoy, sailed on 12 October, and reached Hvalfjörður on 9 November. After discharging her cargo, the ship returned to New York City, where she underwent repairs and alterations. She got underway again on 6 December and steamed to Norfolk.

=== 1942 ===
On 5 February 1942, Algorab sailed to the Caribbean with general cargo on board. She stopped at St. Thomas, U.S. Virgin Islands; San Juan, Puerto Rico; and Guantánamo Bay, Cuba. After loading raw sugar in Cuba, the ship carried it to Baltimore. She moved to New York City shortly thereafter and embarked Army troops for transportation to the South Pacific. She transited the Panama Canal; made port calls at San Diego and San Francisco, California; then continued on to Nukuʻalofa, Tongatapu. Algorab reached Nukuʻalofa on 27 June, then retraced her course to San Francisco, and, upon her return, began a period of repairs.

Algorab left San Francisco on 9 August bound via the Panama Canal for Norfolk. While conducting a tactical maneuver in convoy on 11 September, she collided with USS Harris and suffered extensive damage in the forepart of the ship. Twenty-three feet of her bow was sheared off and one of her bulkheads buckled. One of her crewmen was killed. However, the ship was able to continue unassisted and reached Norfolk on 13 September.

Her repairs completed on 7 October, Algorab loaded and proceeded in company with Transport Division (TransDiv) 5 to Mehdia, French Morocco. She was scheduled to take part in the landings in North Africa. These began on 8 November, and Algorab provided landing boats for assault troops. Ten days later, after completing her role in the successful invasion, she left the area on 18 November bound for Norfolk, where she arrived on 30 November. She underwent a brief period of repairs, then sailed on 17 December for the South Pacific.

=== 1943–1944 ===
Algorab reached Nouméa, New Caledonia, on 18 January 1943 and discharged her cargo. On 1 February, the ship was reclassified an attack cargo ship and redesignated AKA-8. She spent the period between January and June supporting consolidation operations in the southern Solomon Islands. Algorab made a total of five voyages between New Caledonia, Espiritu Santo, and Guadalcanal or Tulagi.

On 30 June, Algorab took part in the landings on Rendova Island. While retiring to Tulagi that afternoon, her convoy was attacked by Japanese torpedo bombers. Her gunners assisted in the destruction of five enemy planes, and the attack cargo ship proceeded to Tulagi. From 1 July to 17 August, she made more voyages carrying troops and equipment between Guadalcanal; Hollandia, New Guinea; New Caledonia; and Espiritu Santo.

Algorab sailed for Australia, on 22 August, arrived at Sydney on the 25th, and began repairs to her main engine. On 15 September, the attack cargo ship sailed to Newcastle, Australia, for amphibious warfare training exercises. After they were completed, she sailed to Moreton Bay, Australia, and remained at anchor there until 22 November. On that date, the ship entered drydock at Brisbane for a major overhaul.

Algorab got underway for the West Coast on 5 September 1944, under tow and operating on reduced power. She reached San Francisco on 30 September for major engine repairs and hull alterations at the Moore Dry Dock Company, Oakland, California.

=== 1945 ===
She left drydock on 30 January 1945 and, following engine trials, sailed on 5 February en route to Leyte, Philippines. The ship paused at Eniwetok to join a convoy; put in at Leyte on 4 March; and, upon her arrival, began onloading ammunition, vehicles, and provisions earmarked for the Ryukyus campaign.

Algorab sailed with TransDiv 37 on 27 March, arrived off Okinawa on 1 April, and sent off her boats at 0600. Her cargo was completely unloaded by 9 April, and Algorab sailed that day for Hawaii. She made a brief stop in Saipan, reached Pearl Harbor on 24 April, and underwent another period of engine repairs before the vessel sailed on 10 May for San Francisco.

Upon her arrival, on 18 May, Algorab received repairs at the General Engineering & Drydock Co. which continued through October. On 14 October, preparations were begun for deactivation. Algorab was decommissioned on 3 December, and her name was struck from the Navy List on 19 December.

=== Honors and awards ===
- Combat Action Ribbon (two awards, for actions of 30 June 1943 and 6 April 1945)
- American Defense Service Medal with "A" device
- American Campaign Medal
- European–African–Middle Eastern Campaign Medal with one battle star for World War II service
- Asiatic-Pacific Campaign Medal with three battle stars for World War II service
- World War II Victory Medal

== Return to commercial service ==
Algorab was declared surplus and returned to the Maritime Commission on 30 June 1946 for layup at Suisun Bay awaiting sale. The ship was sold to Wallem & Co. on 4 April 1947 for merchant service and later renamed Kamran, Mongala, and Hellenic Sailor. She was scrapped in 1973.

== Bibliography ==
- Colton, T. (12 March 2010). "C2 Cargo Ships". Shipbuilding History.
- Colton, T. (18 April 2009). "Cargo Ships (AK, AKA, AKN, AKR, AKS)". Shipbuilding History.
- Maritime Administration. "Mormacwren". Ship History Database Vessel Status Card. U.S. Department of Transportation, Maritime Administration. Archived from the original on 2 April 2015.
- Naval History And Heritage Command. "Algorab". Dictionary of American Naval Fighting Ships. Naval History And Heritage Command.
- "Commission's First C-2 Standard Cargo Vessel". Pacific Marine Review. 36 (July 1939). San Francisco: J.S. Hines. 1939.
- "Sun Launching One C-2 A Month". Pacific Marine Review. 36 (July 1939). San Francisco: J.S. Hines. 1939.
- "The Fleet of Moore-McCormack Lines Operating and Under Construction as of May 7, 1940". Pacific Marine Review. 37 (June 1940). San Francisco: J.S. Hines. 1940.
- "The Maritime Commission Now in Complete Control of Coastwise, Intercoastal and Overseas Shipping—Acquisition of Ships For Emergency". 38 (July 1941). J.S. Hines. 1941: 44–45.
