= USS Mauna Loa (AE-8) =

Ammunition ship of the United States Navy

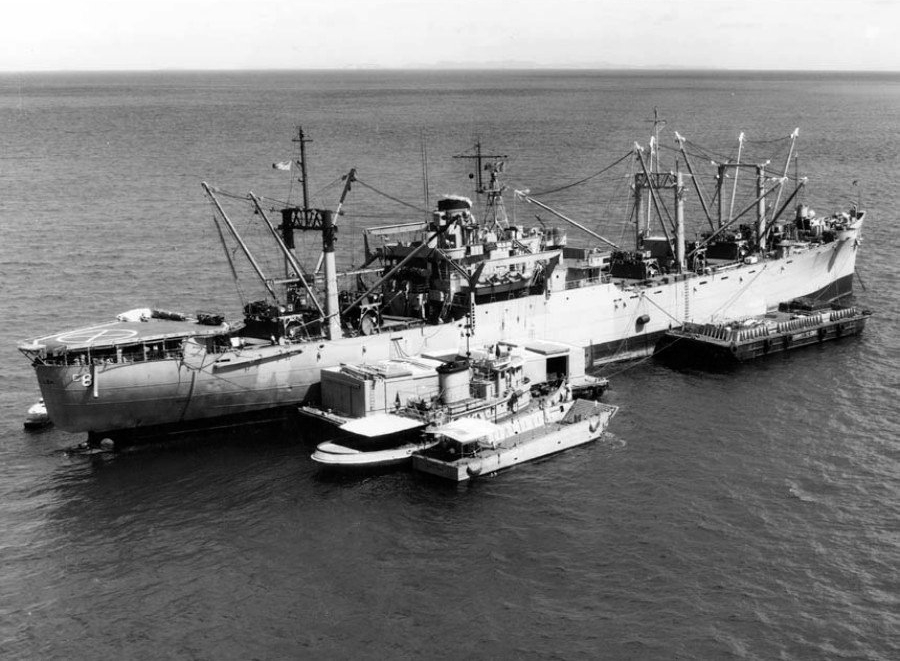
- USS Mauna Loa (AE-8)

History

United States
- Name: USS Mauna Loa (AE-8)
- Namesake: Mauna Loa
- Laid down: 10 December 1942
- Launched: 14 April 1943
- Commissioned: 27 October 1943
- Recommissioned: 31 January 1955; 27 November 1961
- Decommissioned: 2 June 1947; 16 January 1958; 26 February 1971
- Stricken: 1 October 1976
- Fate: Scrapped, 1984

General characteristics
- Class & type: Lassen-class ammunition ship
- Displacement: Light: 6,350 tons; Full load:13,855 tons
- Length: 459 ft (140 m)
- Beam: 63 ft (19.2 m)
- Draft: 25 ft 11 in (7.9 m)
- Propulsion: 2 x 9 cyl. Nordberg diesel engines each with 3155 brake horsepower at 225 rpm geared to 1 shaft
- Speed: 16 knots (30 km/h)
- Capacity: 5,000 deadweight tons
- Complement: 280 officers and enlisted
- Armament: 1 × single 5 in (127 mm) 38 caliber gun; 4 × single 3 in (76 mm) 50 caliber guns; 2 × twin 40 mm guns; 8 × twin 20 mm guns

USS Mauna Loa (AE-8) was an ammunition ship in service with the United States Navy. She was commissioned from 1944 to 1947, and recommissioned between 1955 and 1958 and from 1960 to 1969. Mauna Loa was finally scrapped in 1984.

== History ==
USS Mauna Loa was laid down by Tampa Shipbuilding Co., Tampa, Fla., 10 December 1942; launched 14 April 1943; sponsored by Mrs. Robert E. Friend; and commissioned 27 October 1943. She was named after Mauna Loa, a large shield volcano on the Island of Hawaii.

=== 1944–1947 ===
After shakedown in the Chesapeake Bay, Mauna Loa loaded on 5,600 tons of ammunition at Norfolk and departed Hampton Roads, Va., 19 December with a stopover at San Francisco for 2 days, arriving Pearl Harbor 17 January 1944. Assigned to the service force, on 1 February she continued on to the Marshalls escorted by USS Manlove (DE-36), reaching Majuro 7 days later to begin rearming the fleet.

On 9 February a near-disaster occurred while Mauna Loa was supplying USS Pennsylvania (BB-38) with gunpowder. With the men on Mauna Loa moving the powder containers over faster than they could be removed to the magazines of the battleship, the cans gradually piled up to more than a hundred on Pennsylvania's forward deck. At 16:35 a flash of flame leaped out across her deck, accompanied by a dull boom – one of the cans had exploded.

Grains of burning powder were hurled about, many of them streaking down Mauna Loa's open hold. Without a moment's hesitation, Boatswain F. B. Wilson seized a hose and turned it on the burning can. This stream of water checked the fire until Pennsylvania's men could get the can over the side before it ignited the others. Two of Pennsylvania's men suffered broken legs and the man handling the powder can was blinded.

On 2 March Mauna Loa sailed for the west coast, via Pearl Harbor, arriving San Francisco the 21st to replenish her cargo of ammunition. She got underway 10 April again for the South Pacific, her destination being the New Hebrides. She reached Espiritu Santo 28 April for a month of operations, then proceeded to Eniwetok, Marshalls, where from 13 June to 23 July she supported the Marianas operation.

After a return trip to San Francisco, on 8 September Mauna Loa entered the Kossol Passage, Palaus, in company with USS Shasta (AE-6) and USS McCoy Reynolds (DE-440). She then began a 24‑hour‑a‑day rearming of the 3d Fleet, while swept mines exploded all around the anchorage. After an unidentified plane strafed her during the night of 19 September while USS Portland (CA-33) was alongside, night operations were halted.

By November she was en route to the Carolines, arriving Ulithi the 30th. Mauna Loa remained there until the beginning of the Okinawa campaign. On 13 March 1945 she departed Ulithi with TG 50.8 for 5 successful months on the "line," as it came to be termed, replenishing some 99 ships underway. The Japanese capitulation 14 August found her at San Pedro, Philippines.

Mauna Loa departed San Pedro for the west coast 4 October, arriving Tiburon, Calif., the 21st. She moved up to Bremerton, Wash., 12 November. She then entered the Pacific Reserve Fleet at San Diego 15 May 1946 and decommissioned 2 June 1947.

=== 1955–1958 ===
Mauna Loa recommissioned 31 January 1955 and departed San Diego 16 March for the east coast. After docking at Norfolk Naval Shipyard for alterations, she began refresher training out of Newport, R.I., 8 September; then served out of Earle, N.J., through the end of the year.

On 5 January 1956 Mauna Loa departed Earle with Mine Division 81 for Europe, arriving Naples, Italy, the 24th. The ammunition ship operated with the 6th Fleet in the Mediterranean until 28 May when she steamed from Tangiers for home. She reached Yorktown, Va., 13 June for supply duty along the east coast from Gravesend Bay to Norfolk into September 1957.

On 26 July 1957 the Mauna Loa threatened for more than an hour to emulate the famous Hawaiian volcano in more than just a name. With 3500 tons of explosives and a crew of 220 aboard she caught fire about 5 miles off Ambrose Lightship, the entrance to New York Harbor. The fire was contained to the ship's engine room and was extinguished by crew members. It was towed to Gravesend Bay for repairs the following two weeks. Basing estimates on the destruction caused by the explosion of the USS Mount Hood (AE-11) in 1944, the explosion of the Mauna Loa could have leveled Coney Island and broken all the windows in Manhattan up to 34th Street.

On 27 September she again got underway from Earle for another tour in the Mediterranean until her return to Norfolk 17 November for 2d Fleet operations. From 1 February to 27 June 1958 Mauna Loa made a third visit to the Mediterranean, returning to New York 7 July. She shifted to Beaumont, Texas, on 15 September for inactivation and 16 December again decommissioned this time entering the Atlantic Reserve Fleet at Orange, Texas.

=== 1960–1969 ===
After temporarily joining the National Defense Reserve Fleet at Philadelphia 12 November 1960, Mauna Loa was reacquired and recommissioned the third time 27 November 1961. She sailed from Philadelphia 8 October for her home port, Bayonne, N.J.

On 15 January 1962 the ammunition ship got underway from Norfolk for shakedown off Guantanamo Bay, Cuba, into late February. Following an off-base overhaul in Red Bank, Brooklyn, New York during the fall of 1963, the aft 3 inch- 50 guns were removed and replaced with a helo deck for VertRep ( vertical replenishment ) trials as the first ammo ship to develop this exercise. For the next seven years Mauna Loa continued a pattern of upkeep and supply service along the east coast out of Norfolk and Earle, interspersed with training cruises and exercises in the Caribbean.

She departed Bayonne 9 October 1967 for a new and vital mission, supply operations off Vietnam. She transited the Panama Canal the 16th on her way to the Pacific, and soon thereafter arrived off Vietnam. From 1968 till 1970 her mission was rearming aircraft carriers, destroyers, and cruisers in the Mediterranean Sea.

=== Fate ===
USS Mauna Loa' was finally decommissioned in February 1971. In 1984, she was scrapped in Spain.

== Awards and honors ==
Mauna Loa received three battle stars for World War II service.
