= Bombard =

Bombard may refer to the act of carrying out a bombardment. It may also refer to:

== Individuals ==
- Alain Bombard (1924–2005), French biologist, physician and politician; known for crossing the Atlantic on a small boat with no water or food
- Marc Bombard (born 1949), American baseball player and coach

== Weapons ==
- Bombard (weapon), a cannon or mortar used throughout the Middle Ages and the early modern period
- Blacker Bombard, an anti-tank weapon used by British forces during the early part of World War 2

== Ships ==
- Bombard (vessel), a small two-masted vessel like an English ketch, common in the Mediterranean in the 18th and 19th centuries
- Bombarde (or Bombard), an alternative name for a bomb vessel in the 18th & 19th centuries
- HMAS Bombard (P 99), Royal Australian Navy patrol boat in commission from 1968 to 1993
- USS Bombard (AM-151), a United States Navy minesweeper in commission from 1944 to 1945
- Bombarde, a French Navy La Melpomène-class torpedo boat, commissioned 1938, later captured by Italy in 1942, and then by Germany in 1943, and sunk by US aircraft in 1944.

== Place ==
- Bombardopolis, Haiti, was known in English in the 18th & 19th centuries as Bombarde

== Other ==
- Bombard (music), a double reed instrument used to play traditional Breton music.
- Bombarde (organ stop)
