= USS Lassen (AE-3) =

Ammunition ship of the United States Navy

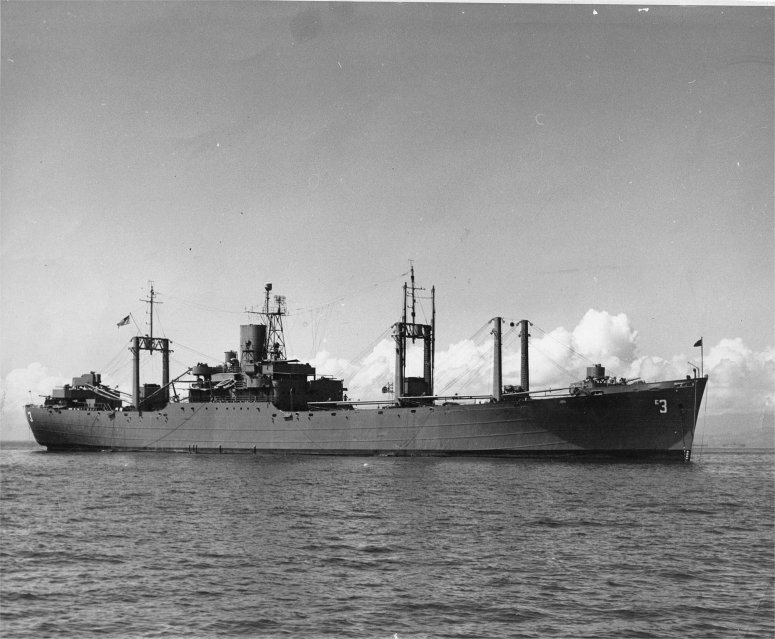
- USS Lassen (AE-3)

History

United States
- Name: Shooting Star; Lassen
- Namesake: 1851 Clipper ship Shooting Star; Lassen Peak
- Launched: 10 January 1940
- Acquired: 15 November 1940
- Commissioned: 27 March 1941
- Decommissioned: 15 January 1947
- Stricken: 1 July 1961
- Fate: Scrapped

General characteristics
- Class & type: Lassen-class ammunition ship
- Type: Maritime Commission type C2 cargo
- Displacement: Light: 6,350 tons; Full load:13,855 tons
- Length: 459 ft (140 m)
- Beam: 63 ft (19.2 m)
- Draft: 25 ft 11 in (7.9 m)
- Installed power: 2 300 kw Westinghouse direct current generators driven by 2 direct-connected 6-cylinder 450 hp (340 kW) Superior diesel engines.
- Propulsion: 2 x 9 cyl. Nordberg diesel engines each with 3,155 bhp (2,353 kW) at 225 rpm geared to 1 shaft through Falk reduction gears and American Blower Corporation hydraulic oil couplings
- Speed: 16 knots (30 km/h)
- Capacity: 5,000 deadweight tons
- Complement: 280 officers and enlisted
- Armament: 1 × single 5 in (127 mm) 38 caliber gun; 4 × single 3 in (76 mm) 50 caliber guns; 2 × twin 40 mm guns; 8 × twin 20 mm guns

USS Lassen (AE-3) was built as MS Shooting Star under a U.S. Maritime Commission contract, was delivered to the U.S. Navy after sea trials, and became an ammunition cargo ship during World War II. Like many Naval ships of this category that carried large amounts of explosive cargo, she was named for a volcano (or a volcanic island). In this case, the ship was named for Lassen Peak, a volcano in northern California that erupted heavily in 1914–17.

== Construction and commission ==
Shooting Star was built by the Tampa Shipbuilding Company in Tampa, Florida, under a Maritime Commission contract. She was the second of eight C2 type motor ships of a series constructed by Tampa Shipbuilding & Engineering Company, Tampa, Florida powered by twin Nordberg diesels, the first being Sea Witch. The ship was intended for American Pioneer Line's service to Asia and Australia.

She was launched on 10 January 1940, christened by Mrs. Fred C. Cone. The ship was acquired by the Navy on 15 November 1940, and commissioned four days later for transfer to a shipyard in Mobile, Alabama, for conversion to a naval ammunition ship, with Lieutenant Commander A. B. Kerr in command. The vessel was re-commissioned in her modified form on 27 March 1941, with Commander Russell S. Berkey of the U.S. Navy in command.

== Service history ==
=== World War II ===
In the months previous to the outbreak of World War II for the United States, the Lassen made ammunition deliveries along both the Atlantic and Pacific Coasts of the U.S., and in July 1941, she steamed to Pearl Harbor, Territory of Hawaii, and then returned to the Atlantic Coast. On 22 November 1941, she departed from Norfolk, Virginia, en route to San Francisco, her homeport, and war broke out during this voyage.

After round-trip delivery voyages to the Samoa Islands, the Fiji Islands, and Pearl Harbor, the Lassen began duty as an advanced base supply ship. Departing from San Francisco on 26 August 1942, the Lassen replenished naval ships in New Caledonia from 19 September to 17 January 1943. The ship arrived back at San Francisco on 23 January 1943 for repairs, the installation of radar equipment, and an upgrade in her air-defense armament.

On 18 May 1943, the Lassen arrived at Espiritu Santo, in the New Hebrides, to resume dispensing war ammunition to the Navy fleet in the South Pacific. She also resupplied warships from the port of Efate, New Hebrides, and Noumea, New Caledonia, before returning to San Francisco on 24 November. An overhaul period in a drydock was a prelude to a more extensive stay in the war zone supplying the American warships that were battling the Imperial Japanese Navy.

As a part of Vice-Admiral W. L. Calhoun's 7th Force, Pacific Fleet, the ammunition ship arrived at Majuro Atoll in the Marshall Islands on 2 February 1944. She replenished ships both in the Marshall Islands and at Manus Island in the Admiralty Islands. As part of the supply train of the fleet at Kossol Passage, Palau Islands, from 25 September to 2 October and at Ulithi Atoll from 4 October to 18 November 1944, she earned her first battle star. During the latter period, the Lassen rode out a severe typhoon, and she also underwent her first enemy air attack.

Upon returning to the western Caroline Islands on 23 February 1945, the Lassen, along with her sister ammunition ships, worked out techniques for transferring large quantities of ammunition to warships while underway at sea. The Lassen exhibited this new ability and mobility by accompanying aircraft carrier Task Group 50.8 in raids from 13 March to 14 June 1945, while supporting the conquest of Okinawa campaign. The Lassen's third battle star was earned while accompanying carrier Task Group 30.8 from 8 July to 6 August off the coasts of Japan itself.

=== Post-war ===
The end of the war at V-J Day found the Lassen operating out of San Pedro Bay, Leyte. On 25 October, she departed the former war zone for the United States, via Eniwetok Atoll, where she embarked 112 passengers for their transportation to the West Coast.

There was little need for ammunition ships like the Lassen during the period of huge peacetime demobilization of the Navy that followed. The vessel was noted for carrying out her dangerous ammunition delivery and handling duties without any serious incidents during the War in the Pacific. She was held in port first at Port Discovery, Washington, from 20 November 1945 to 2 March 1946, and then she proceeded down the West Coast in stages, arriving at San Diego on 27 March 1946. The ship was decommissioned on 15 January 1947 and entered the Pacific Reserve Fleet. She remained a part of this reserve fleet until she was struck from the Navy list on 1 July 1961 for disposal.

== Merits ==
The Lassen received three battle stars for her World War II service.

== Disposal ==
On 30 August Lassen entered the Suisun Bay Reserve Fleet in Maritime Administration custody. After being struck from the Navy list on 1 July 1961 title was transferred to MARAD on 1 October 1962. The ship remained in the Suisun Bay fleet until sold 16 March 1976 to Nicolai Joffe Corporation as one of four ships for a lump sum of $898,327.96. On 26 April 1976 the ship was removed from the fleet for scrapping.

== Bibliography ==
- Maritime Administration. "Lassen (AE-3)". Ship History Database Vessel Status Card. U.S. Department of Transportation, Maritime Administration.
- Naval History And Heritage Command (29 July 2015). "Lassen". Dictionary of American Naval Fighting Ships. Naval History And Heritage Command.
- "The Marine Fluid Drive". Pacific Marine Review. Consolidated 1939 issues (October). 'Official Organ: Pacific American Steamship Association/Shipowners' Association of the Pacific Coast: 48. October 1939.
- "Shooting Star". Pacific Marine Review. Consolidated 1940 issues (January). 'Official Organ: Pacific American Steamship Association/Shipowners' Association of the Pacific Coast: 77. January 1940.
- "MS Shooting Star Delivered to Navy". Pacific Marine Review. Consolidated 1940 issues (December). 'Official Organ: Pacific American Steamship Association/Shipowners' Association of the Pacific Coast: 42–45. December 1940.
