= USS Cadmus =

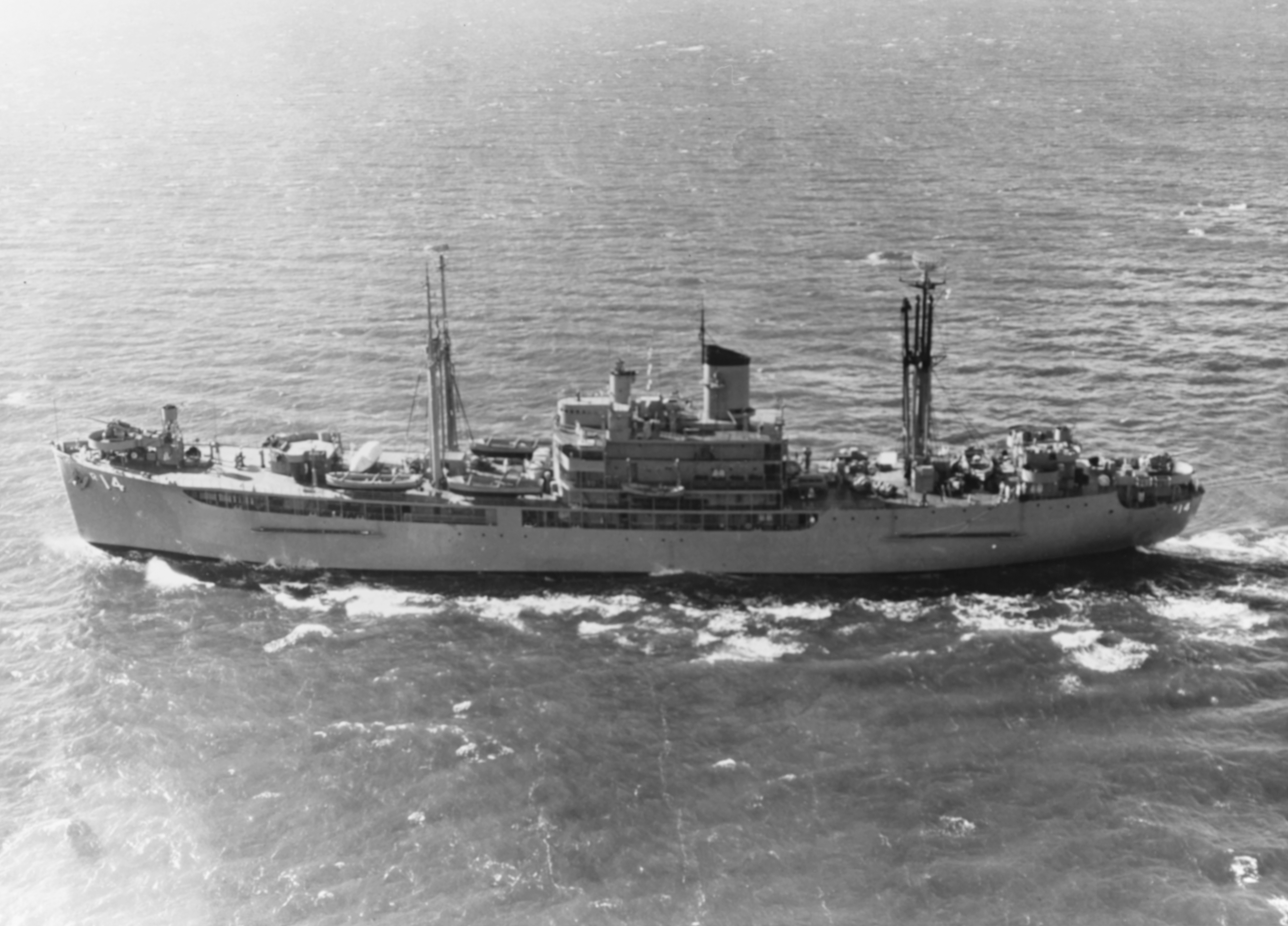

History

United States
- Name: USS Cadmus (AR-14)
- Namesake: Cadmus
- Awarded: 3 August 1944
- Builder: Tampa Shipbuilding Company
- Laid down: 30 October 1944
- Launched: 5 August 1945
- Acquired: 23 April 1946
- Commissioned: 23 April 1946
- Decommissioned: 14 September 1971
- Stricken: 15 January 1974
- Fate: Sold to the Republic of China, 22 April 1974

History

Republic of China
- Name: ROCS Yu Tai (A-521)
- Acquired: 22 April 1974
- Commissioned: 7 March 1976
- Decommissioned: 16 April 1998
- Stricken: 1998
- Fate: Scrapped around 1998-99

General characteristics
- Class & type: Cadmus-class repair ship
- Displacement: 8,800 long tons (8,900 t) (standard); 14,570 long tons (14,800 t) (full load)
- Length: 492 ft (150 m)
- Beam: 69 ft 6 in (21.18 m)
- Draft: 27 ft 6 in (8.38 m)
- Speed: 16 kn (18 mph; 30 km/h)
- Complement: 921
- Armament: 2 × 5 in (130 mm) guns

USS Cadmus (AR-14) was a Amphion-class repair ship of the United States Navy during World War II. Cadmus launched on 5 August 1945 by the Tampa Shipbuilding Company in Tampa, Florida, and sponsored by Mrs. B. P. Ward. Cadmus was commissioned 23 April 1946.

== Service history ==
Assigned to the Atlantic Fleet, Cadmus operated from her home port at Norfolk, Virginia, as a repair ship. Calls to east coast ports and cruises in the Caribbean were part of a schedule which called for service to the Fleet during major exercises. On 3 September 1957, the repair ship cleared Norfolk on her first Atlantic crossing. After taking part in NATO Operation Strikeback exercises with Task Force 88 (TF 88) out of Rothesay, Scotland, she visited ports in Scotland, France, and Spain. Through the first half of 1958, she sailed with TF 63 in replenishment missions during fleet exercises in the Mediterranean. From her return to Norfolk on 7 May 1958 through 1960, Cadmus continued her program of east coast and Caribbean operations. Cadmus moved her homeport to Newport, Rhode Island in 1964.

Cadmus was decommissioned on 14 September 1971 and was stricken from the Naval Vessel Register on 15 January 1974. Cadmus was sold under the National Security Assistance Program to the Republic of China on 22 April 1974. She served as ROCS Yu Tai (A-521).
