= USS Diploma =

Minesweeper of the United States Navy

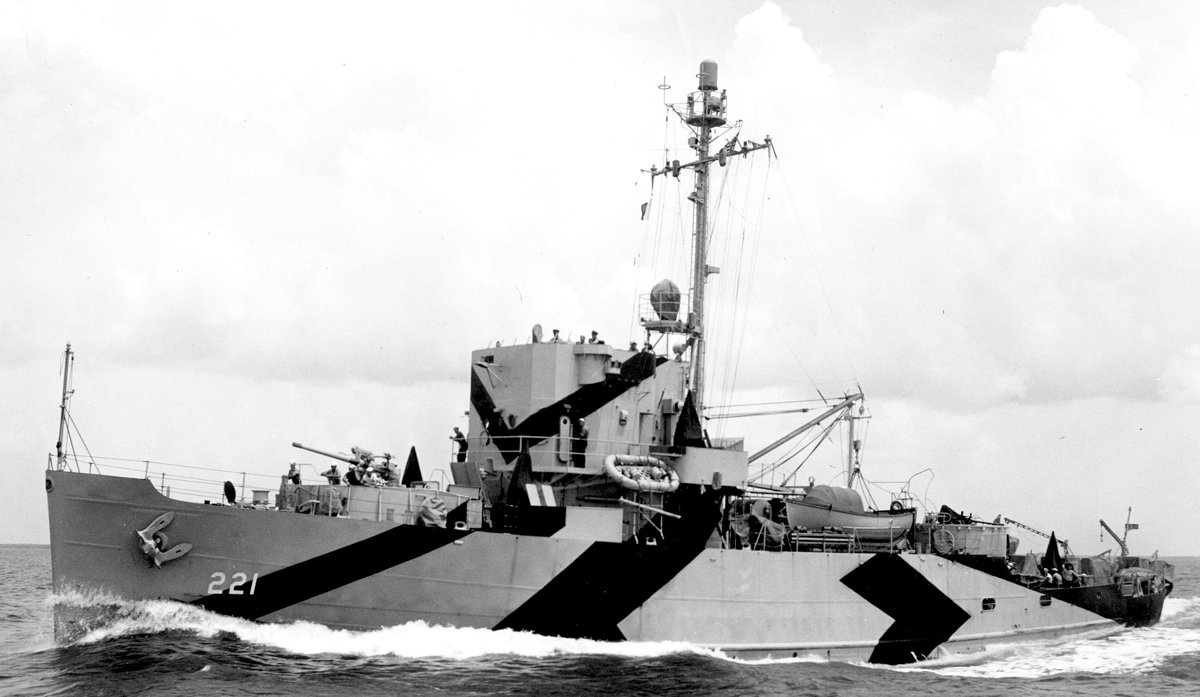
- Diploma at Tampa, Florida in July 1944.

History

United States
- Name: USS Diploma (AM-221)
- Builder: Tampa Shipbuilding Company, Tampa, Florida
- Laid down: 1 July 1943
- Launched: 21 May 1944
- Sponsored by: Mrs. F. J. Erwin, Jr.
- Commissioned: 15 July 1944
- Decommissioned: 3 September 1946
- Reclassified: MSF-221, 7 February 1954
- Fate: Transferred to Mexican Navy, 1962

History

Mexico
- Name: ARM DM-17
- Acquired: 1962
- Renamed: ARM Cadete Francisco Márquez (C59), 1994
- Namesake: Francisco Márquez
- Stricken: 2000
- Fate: unknown

General characteristics
- Class & type: Admirable-class minesweeper
- Displacement: 650 long tons (660 t)
- Length: 184 ft 6 in (56.24 m)
- Beam: 33 ft (10 m)
- Draft: 9 ft 9 in (2.97 m)
- Propulsion: 2 × ALCO 539 diesel engines, 1,710 shp (1,280 kW); Farrel-Birmingham single reduction gear; 2 shafts
- Speed: 15 knots (28 km/h)
- Complement: 104
- Armament: 1 × 3"/50 caliber (76 mm) DP gun; 2 × twin Bofors 40 mm guns; 1 × Hedgehog anti-submarine mortar; 2 × Depth charge tracks

Service record
- Part of: U.S. Pacific Fleet (1944–1946); Mexican Navy (1962–2000)
- Operations: Battle of Okinawa
- Awards: 3 Battle stars

USS Diploma (AM-221) was an Admirable-class minesweeper built for the United States Navy during World War II. She was awarded three battle stars for service in the Pacific during World War II. She was decommissioned in September 1946 and placed in reserve. While she remained in reserve, Diploma was reclassified as MSF-221 in February 1955 but never reactivated. In 1962, she was sold to the Mexican Navy and renamed ARM DM-17. In 1994 she was renamed ARM Cadete Francisco Márquez (C59). She was stricken in 2000, in 2004 she was cleaned of contaminants and sunk as an artificial reef on the west coast of Isla Espiritu Santo, off La Paz BCS, Mexico. She is a popular local dive site, The C59, and is resting on her side at 70'/20m to 30'/9m of depth.

== U.S. Navy career ==
Diploma was launched 21 May 1944 by Tampa Shipbuilding Co., Inc., Tampa, Florida; sponsored by Mrs. F. J. Erwin, Jr.; and commissioned 15 July 1944.

Diploma arrived at Pearl Harbor 12 January 1945 with the disabled U.S. Army freighter FS-318 in tow. The next day she sailed on convoy escort duty to Guam and Eniwetok, returning to Pearl Harbor 17 February. Diploma was underway from Pearl Harbor 23 February for Ulithi where she conducted minesweeping exercises in preparation for the invasion of Okinawa. On 19 March she got underway for Okinawa to engage in pre-invasion minesweeping from 24 March until 1 April and then patrolled during the initial landings. From 17 April to 15 May she was in Ulithi for repairs. After escorting convoys to Guam and Saipan, Diploma returned to Okinawa the last day of May to resume patrolling. From 4 July to 31 July she swept mines in support of the final U.S. 3rd Fleet raids on the Japanese mainland.

After the cessation of hostilities she continued sweeping in the East China Sea-Ryukyus area and in the Tsugaru Straits into Ominato Naval Base at the northern tip of Honshū. Diploma received three battle stars for World War II service.

On 20 November Diploma sailed for the west coast, arriving at San Diego, California, 20 December. She was underway on 5 January 1946 for Mobile, Alabama, and after visits there and at New Orleans, Louisiana, arrived at Orange, Texas, 12 May. Diploma was placed out of commission in reserve there 3 September 1946. She was reclassified MSF-221, 7 February 1955. Transferred to Mexico as DM-17, later renamed Cadete Francisco Marquez (C-59)

== Mexican Navy career ==
The former Diploma was acquired by the Mexican Navy in 1962 and renamed ARM DM-17. In 1994, she was renamed ARM Cadete Francisco Márquez (C59) after Francisco Márquez. She was stricken in 2000, in 2004 she was cleaned of contaminants and sunk as an artificial reef on the west coast of Isla Espiritu Santo, off La Paz BCS, Mexico. She is a popular local dive site, The C59, and is resting on her side at 70'/20m to 30'/9m of depth.
