= SS Harry Culbreath =

SS Harry Culbreath may refer to:

- SS Harry Culbreath (1942), a Type C2-F ship laid down as Harry Culbreath; transferred to United States Navy as cargo ship USS Titania (AK-55); broken up in 1974
- SS Harry Culbreath (1945), a Type C2-S-AJ1 ship; broken up in 1971
