= USS Cates =

Cannon-class destroyer escort

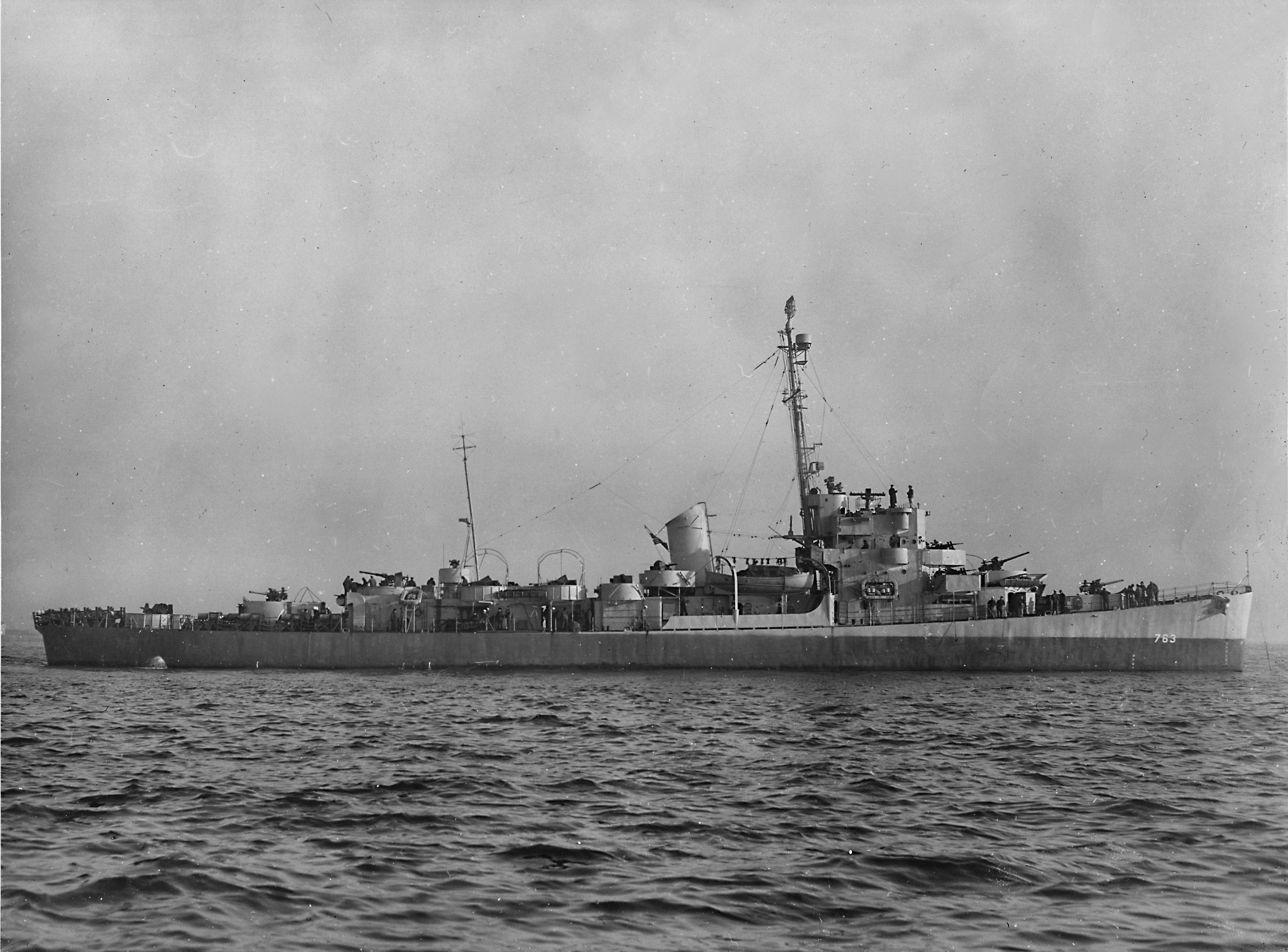
- USS Cates (DE-763) New York Harbor - Taken off the New York Navy Yard, 28 November 1944.

History

United States
- Name: USS Cates (DE-763)
- Namesake: William Finnic Cates
- Builder: Tampa Shipbuilding Company, Tampa, Florida
- Laid down: 1 March 1943
- Launched: 19 October 1943
- Commissioned: 15 December 1943
- Decommissioned: 28 March 1947
- Stricken: 20 December 1950
- Fate: Transferred to France, 11 November 1950
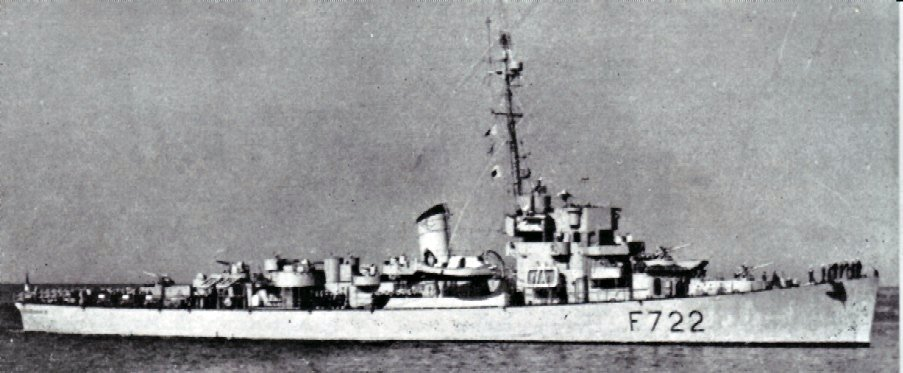
- French frigate Soudanais (F-722, ex-USS Cates DE 763) underway.

History

France
- Name: Soudanais (F722)
- Namesake: Sudanese people
- Acquired: 11 November 1950
- Stricken: 1959
- Fate: Scrapped, 1959

General characteristics
- Class & type: Cannon-class destroyer escort
- Displacement: 1,240 long tons (1,260 t) standard; 1,620 long tons (1,646 t) full
- Length: 306 ft (93 m) o/a; 300 ft (91 m) w/l
- Beam: 36 ft 10 in (11.23 m)
- Draft: 11 ft 8 in (3.56 m)
- Propulsion: 4 × GM Mod. 16-278A diesel engines with electric drive, 6,000 shp (4,474 kW), 2 screws
- Speed: 21 knots (39 km/h; 24 mph)
- Range: 10,800 nmi (20,000 km) at 12 kn (22 km/h; 14 mph)
- Complement: 15 officers and 201 enlisted
- Armament: 3 × single Mk.22 3"/50 caliber guns; 1 × twin 40 mm Mk.1 AA gun; 8 × 20 mm Mk.4 AA guns; 3 × 21 inch (533 mm) torpedo tubes; 1 × Hedgehog Mk.10 anti-submarine mortar (144 rounds); 8 × Mk.6 depth charge projectors; 2 × Mk.9 depth charge tracks

USS Cates (DE-763) was a Cannon-class destroyer escort built for the United States Navy during World War II. She served in the Atlantic Ocean and the Pacific Ocean and provided escort service against submarine and air attack for Navy vessels and convoys.

== Namesake ==
William Finnic Cates was born on 30 April 1916 in Drummonds, Tennessee. He enlisted in the United States Naval Reserve on 21 January 1942. While serving as Seaman Second Class on the USS San Francisco he was killed in action on 12 November 1942 when a Japanese torpedo plane, which he kept under fire while refusing to leave his station, crashed into the ship. He was posthumously awarded the Navy Cross.

== Construction and commissioning ==
Cates was launched 10 October 1943 by Tampa Shipbuilding Co., Inc., Tampa, Florida; sponsored by Mrs. P. Dyer; commissioned 15 December 1943 and reported to the Atlantic Fleet.

== History ==
=== World War II North Atlantic operations ===
Between 27 February and 1 May 1944, Cates guarded two convoys carrying American troops from the US to ports in Ireland and Wales in the lengthy preparations for the invasion of Normandy, braving the risks of submarine attack and the vicious North Atlantic weather.

After a brief period training with submarines from New London, Connecticut, Cates completed 1944 with five convoy voyages from New York to ports in Ireland, Great Britain, and France escorting tankers carrying critical petroleum products to support the push of the Allies across Europe. Cates opened 1945 with a brief training period in Casco Bay, Maine, then a return to tanker convoy duty from Boston, Massachusetts, to Scotland, returning to New York on 18 February. Two weeks later she sailed in the escort of another convoy, but had to break off and return to Earle, New Jersey, for repairs, followed by refresher training in Casco Bay, including a 2-week anti-submarine sweep along the northeast coast. She returned to New York 20 April, and sailed 4 days later escorting tankers to Liverpool.

=== Transfer to Pacific Theatre operations ===
Returning to New York with empty tankers on 23 May 1945, Cates sailed on to training in Cuban waters, passed through the Panama Canal, and arrived at Pearl Harbor on 31 July for training and overhaul. Arriving at Eniwetok on 30 August, she began six months of convoy escort supporting the redeployment of troops in the Far East, calling at ports in the Philippines, Japan, and Okinawa until 18 February 1946.

== Post-War decommissioning ==
She then cleared for San Pedro, California, Norfolk, Virginia, and Green Cove Springs, Florida. She arrived at the latter port 22 April for duty training reservists until 28 March 1947, when she was decommissioned there. Cates was transferred to France under the Military Assistance Program on 11 November 1950, and served in the French Navy as Soudanais (F.722) until stricken and scrapped in 1959.

== See also ==
- List of Escorteurs of the French Navy
