= USS Procyon (AKA-2) =

Cargo ship of the United States Navy

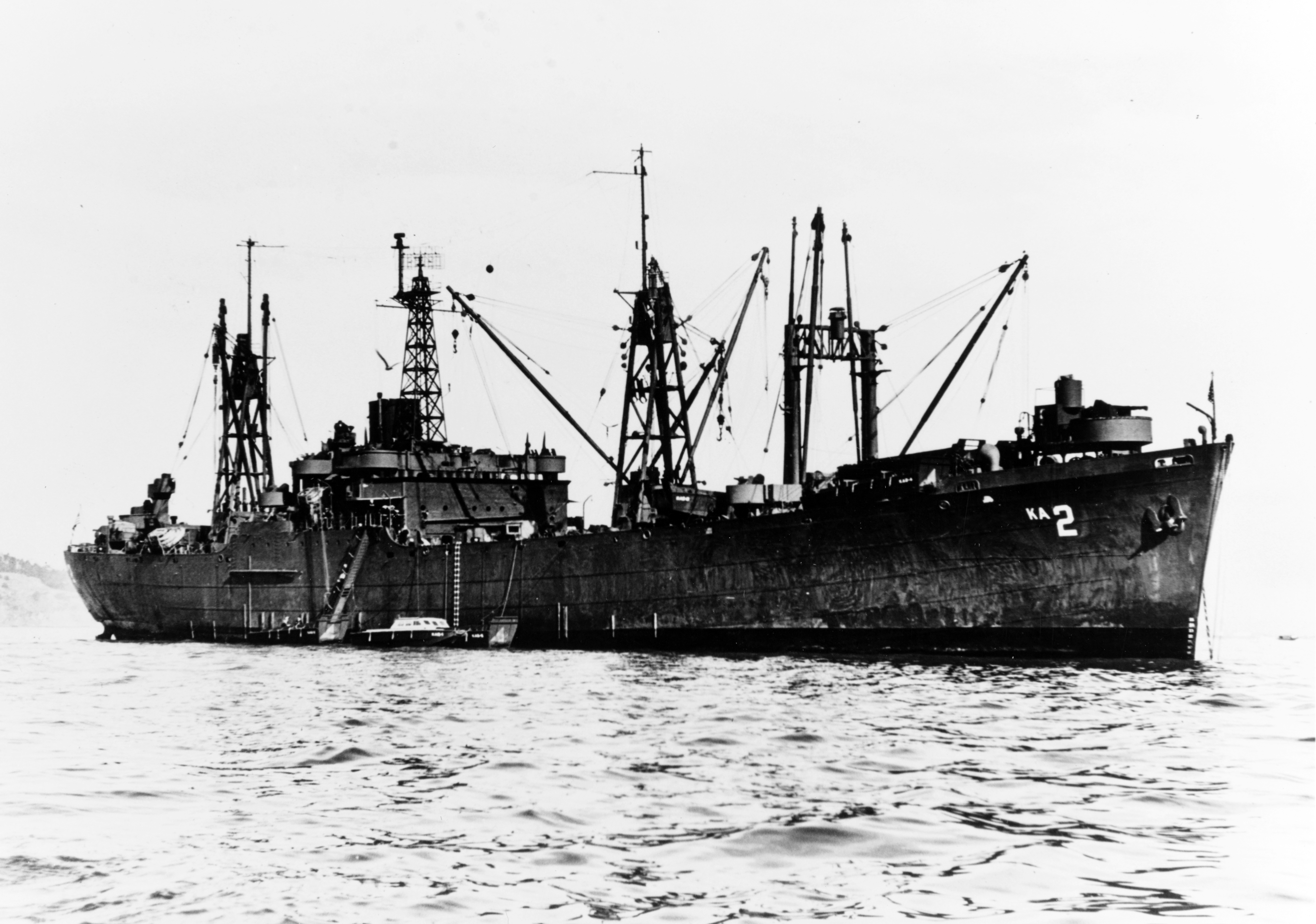

History

United States
- Name: USS Procyon
- Namesake: Procyon, a star in the constellation Canis Minor
- Builder: Tampa Shipbuilding Company, Tampa, Florida
- Laid down: 15 January 1940, as SS Sweepstakes
- Launched: 14 November 1940
- Acquired: 14 November 1940
- Commissioned: 28 August 1941, as USS Procyon (AK–19)
- Decommissioned: 23 March 1946
- Reclassified: AKA-2 (attack cargo ship), 1 February 1943
- Stricken: 12 April 1946
- Fate: Sold for scrap, 19 November 1973

General characteristics
- Class & type: Arcturus-class attack cargo ship
- Type: Type C2 ship
- Displacement: 14,225 long tons (14,453 t)
- Length: 459 ft 3 in (139.98 m)
- Beam: 63 ft (19 m)
- Draft: 25 ft 6 in (7.77 m)
- Speed: 16.5 knots (30.6 km/h; 19.0 mph)
- Complement: 412
- Armament: 1 × 5"/38 caliber gun mount; 4 × twin 40 mm gun mounts

Service record
- Operations: Invasion of North Africa (1942); Invasion of Sicily (1943); Salerno Landings (1943); Landings in southern France (1944); Battle of Okinawa (1945)
- Awards: 5 battle stars

USS Procyon (AKA-2) was an Arcturus-class attack cargo ship of the United States Navy, named after Procyon, a star in the constellation Canis Minor. She was laid down and launched in 1940, entering service shortly before the American entry into World War II. She served with distinction in World War II, earning five battle stars. Her work included shipping planes in the Pacific, and troops in North Africa. She was part of the Invasion of Sicily and the Invasion of Okinawa. She served as a commissioned ship for 5 years and 4 months. In 1946, the ship was decommissioned, and was later sold to Levin Metals Corp. on 19 November 1973.

== Service history ==
Procyon (AK–19) was laid down 15 January 1940 as Maritime Commission C hull 22, SS Sweepstakes, by the Tampa Shipbuilding Company, Tampa, Florida, launched and acquired by the Navy, through MARAD, 14 November 1940; sponsored by Miss Dorthy Ramspeck; and commissioned on 8 August 1941 as Procyon (AK–19), at Charleston, S.C.

=== Pacific ===
After shakedown, Procyon was assigned to the Naval Transportation Service and she reported to Norfolk, Va. on 25 August to load cargo for Caribbean bases. She sailed 2 September reaching as far as Panama before returning to Norfolk on the 23rd. She put to sea again on 10 October, transited the Panama Canal 20 October bound for San Pedro, Calif., and proceeded to Pearl Harbor 12 November. Procyon remained at Pearl 18–24 November and returned to California at the end of the month. She was entering the Mare Island Navy Yard the day of the attack on Pearl Harbor, when, receiving emergency sailing orders, she shifted to a San Francisco dock to load a cargo of blood plasma and medical supplies. Departing San Francisco 12 December, she entered Pearl Harbor on the 19th. Procyon returned to San Francisco 6 January 1942 and commenced round-the-clock loading of fighter planes and their Marine pilots destined for Pago Pago, Samoa. She completed three round trips between those points by 23 April.

=== Invasion of North Africa ===
Procyon transported troops and equipment through August to Malevu Island, Noumea and Pearl, and then transferred to the Atlantic in September to join the Amphibious Force of the U.S. Atlantic Fleet for the planned invasion of North Africa. She sailed 24 October with the Southern Attack Group of Admiral H. Kent Hewitt's Western Naval Task Force, which gathered at midnight 7–8 November off the Moroccan coast. Procyon participated in the assault operations which brought about the surrender of Cape Fedhela and Casablanca and returned to Norfolk 30 November for conversion to an attack cargo ship. Redesignated AKA–2 on 1 February 1943, she spent the next two months conducting amphibious warfare exercises in the Chesapeake Bay area. In April she put into the yards at Philadelphia for the installation of radar and additional armament.

=== Sicily, Salerno, and southern France ===
Procyon participated in the invasion landings at Sicily in July and at Salerno in September. Unloading army vehicles at Naples, following the invasion at Salerno, Procyon moved to Arzew, Algeria and commenced a program of shipboard indoctrination and practice assault landings for the training of Free French Forces, including Algerian and Senegalese troops. When this training ceased 22 November, she shifted to Oran and joined a convoy headed for the Clyde River in Scotland. She entered the Clyde River 9 December and docked at Glasgow to off-load mail, army personnel, and much needed aircraft parts and ammunition cases. Ten days later she passed out to sea in convoy and under escort by HMS Searcher, bound for the U.S. She arrived Norfolk 2 January 1944, and following independent operations, shifted to New York 14 February to load cargo for shipment to the British Isles. Skirting known positions of German "wolf-packs", she reached Swansea, Wales 11 March and sailed again 13 April with a merchant convoy bound for Algeria. She entered the now familiar Mers-el-Kebir Harbor 26 April and commenced a hectic training schedule in preparation for the invasion of Southern France. Procyon, with men of the 180th Battalion of the famed 45th "Thunderbird" Division embarked, participated in the landings at the Golfe de St. Tropez 15 August. Three times she returned to France carrying Army cargo from Naples before sailing 20 October to return to Philadelphia.

=== Battle of Okinawa ===
Procyon departed Philadelphia 28 December for her second tour of Pacific duty, arriving Pearl Harbor 19 January 1945. She operated in support of the Okinawa invasion during April, returning to San Francisco 19 May to begin a series of shuttle runs to Hawaii, Ulithi and Samar. In October she transported occupation troops to Japan from the Philippines, and by 2 November she was making best speed for Seattle, Washington.

== Decommissioning and sale ==
Procyon arrived Seattle 14 November, shifted to Portland, Oregon 18 November, and sailed two days later to report to the Mare Island Navy Yard for inactivation. She decommissioned there on 23 March 1946, was struck from the Naval Vessel Register on 12 April, and was returned to MARAD on 1 July for lay up at Suisun Bay, California. She was subsequently sold for scrap to Levin Metals Corp. on 19 November 1973.

Procyon earned five battle stars for World War II service.
