= USS Crag =

Minesweeper of the United States Navy

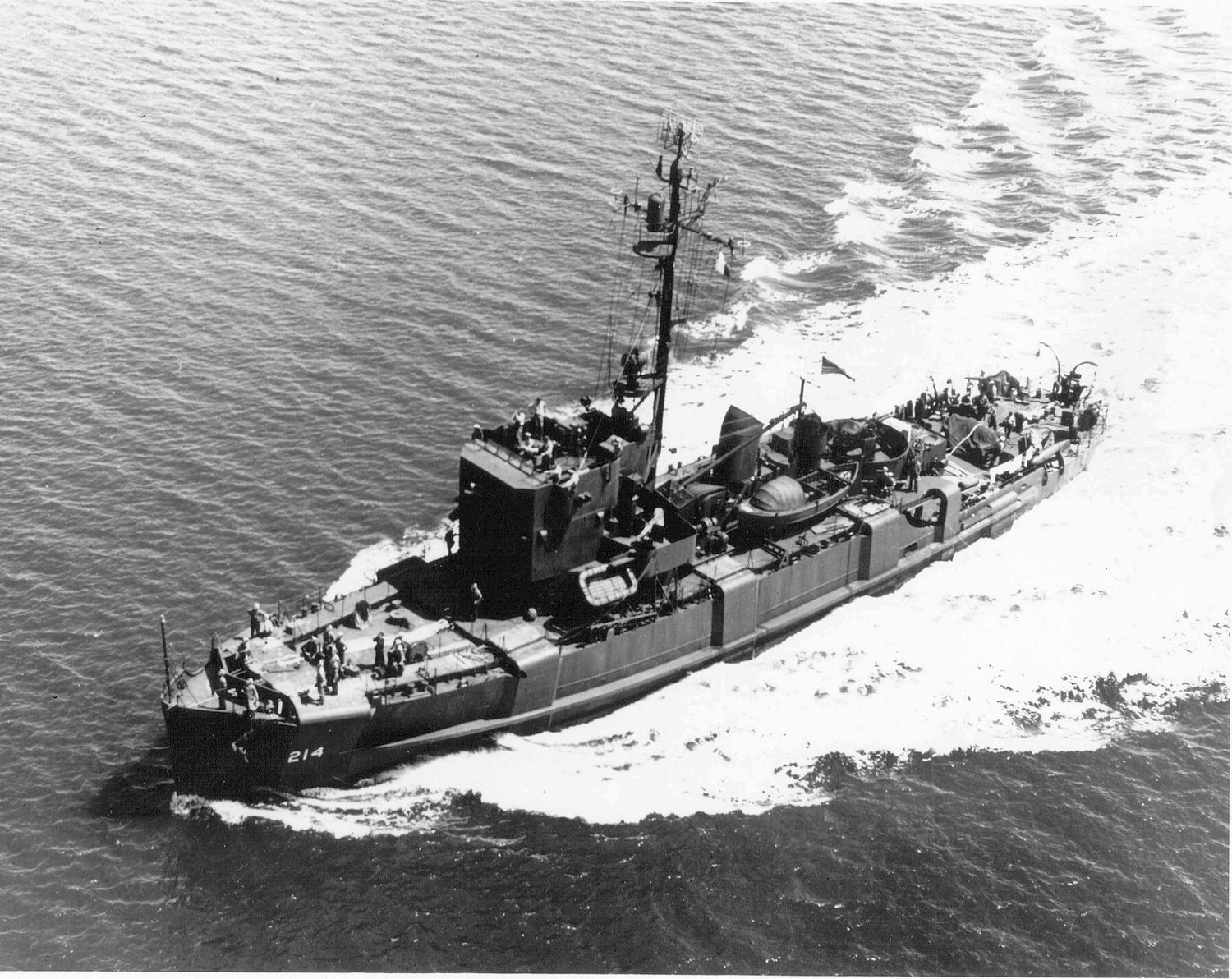
- Crag underway in 1945

History

United States
- Name: USS Craig (AM-214)
- Builder: Tampa Shipbuilding Company, Tampa, Florida
- Laid down: 7 December 1942
- Launched: 21 March 1943
- Sponsored by: Mrs. Q. Abercrombie-St. John
- Renamed: USS Crag (AM-214), 3 August 1944
- Commissioned: 1 August 1945
- Decommissioned: 19 March 1948
- Reclassified: MSF-214, 7 February 1955
- Fate: Transferred to Mexican Navy, 1962

History

Mexico
- Name: ARM DM-15
- Acquired: 1962
- Fate: unknown

General characteristics
- Class & type: Admirable-class minesweeper
- Displacement: 650 long tons (660 t)
- Length: 184 ft 6 in (56.24 m)
- Beam: 33 ft (10 m)
- Draft: 9 ft 9 in (2.97 m)
- Propulsion: 2 × ALCO 539 diesel engines, 1,710 shp (1,280 kW); Farrel-Birmingham single reduction gear; 2 shafts
- Speed: 15 knots (28 km/h)
- Complement: 104
- Armament: 1 × 3"/50 caliber (76 mm) DP gun; 2 × twin Bofors 40 mm guns; 1 × Hedgehog anti-submarine mortar; 2 × Depth charge tracks

Service record
- Part of: U.S. Pacific Fleet (1945–1946); U.S. Atlantic Fleet (1946–1948); Mexican Navy (1962–2000)
- Awards: 1 Battle star

USS Crag (AM-214) was an Admirable-class minesweeper built for the United States Navy during World War II. She was originally ordered, laid down, and launched as USS Craig (AM-214), but was renamed Crag in August 1944. She was awarded one battle star for service in the Pacific sweeping mines after the end of World War II. She was decommissioned in March 1948 and placed in reserve. While she remained in reserve, Crag was reclassified as MSF-214 in February 1955 but never reactivated. In 1962, she was sold to the Mexican Navy and renamed ARM DM-15. Her ultimate fate is not reported in secondary sources.

== U.S. Navy career ==
Initially named Craig, the ship was launched on 21 March 1943 by sponsor Mrs. Q. Abercrombie-St. John at Tampa Shipbuilding Co., Inc., of Tampa, Florida. The spelling of the ship's name was changed to Crag on 3 August 1944. She was completed at the Charleston Navy Yard and commissioned on 1 August 1945.

Crag served with the Naval Mine Warfare Test Station, Solomons Island, Maryland, until 17 December 1945 when she sailed upriver to Washington, D.C., for leave and upkeep. On 4 January 1946 she sailed for the west coast arriving at San Pedro, California, 3 February. She remained there until 21 March when she sailed to Hong Kong, calling at Pearl Harbor, Eniwetok, and Guam on her outward bound passage. She swept mines in the East Hainan Straits until 16 June when she cleared Hong Kong, returning to San Francisco, California, 14 August.

Reassigned to the Atlantic Fleet, Crag sailed from San Francisco, California, 4 October 1946 and arrived at Charleston, South Carolina, 3 November for overhaul. From 9 February 1947 to 26 May she served at the U.S. Navy Mine Countermeasures Station at Panama City, Florida, and after overhaul, joined in exercises in Chesapeake Bay from 13 October to 28 November. On 2 December she sailed from Charleston and visited New Orleans, Louisiana, from 8 December to 20 December before reporting to Orange, Texas, 22 December. There Crag was placed out of commission in reserve 19 March 1948. She was sold to Mexico in 1962. Crag received one battle star for her post-World War II minesweeping. In 1962, Crag was sold to Mexico.

== Mexican Navy career ==
The former Crag was acquired by the Mexican Navy in October 1962 and renamed ARM DM-15. Her ultimate fate is not reported in secondary sources.
