= Uplifting Athletes =

U.S. non-profit organization

- Abbreviation: UA
- Formation: 2007; 19 years ago
- Founder: Scott Shirley
- Type: Nonprofit organization
- Tax ID no.: 34-1986485
- Legal status: 501(c)(3)
- Headquarters: Philadelphia, Pennsylvania, U.S.
- Key people: Scott Shirley (founder)
- Website: www.upliftingathletes.org

Uplifting Athletes is a non-profit organization which harnesses the power of sport to build a community that invests in the lives of those affected by rare diseases. The group was established in 2003 and is a 501(c)(3).

The organization was founded in 2003 by a group of Penn State Nittany Lions football players who turned an annual weightlifting competition, Lift for Life, into a fundraiser. Wide receiver Scott Shirley's father was diagnosed with kidney cancer in 2003. When Shirley turned to his teammates for support, he discovered three others also had fathers battling the disease. Because so few (less than 200,000) Americans are diagnosed with kidney cancer, funds to fight the disease are scarce. Two of Shirley's teammates, offensive tackle Damone Jones and center Dave Costlow, saw an opportunity for student-athletes to use their high-profile and access to the media to promote awareness and raise funds for under-served charities. The three formed Uplifting Athletes later that year.

== Chapters ==
Uplifting Athletes' founding chapter is at Penn State University. The football team there has designated the Kidney Cancer Association as their charity. To date the team has raised over $300,000 for that charity. The Penn State chapter raises funds through its annual weight-lifting competition, Lift for Life. The competition features teams of four players competing in 11 strength and conditioning events, such as bench press and the "giant tire flip."

Subsequent chapters have formed at other universities. Some of the earlier chapters to form include:

- A chapter at Boston College benefiting Ewing's sarcoma
- One at Colgate University benefiting Ehlers–Danlos syndrome
- A chapter at the University of Maryland benefiting cystic fibrosis.
- A chapter at Ohio State University has also chosen to support the Kidney Cancer Association. Members of OSU's football team hold a video game tournament to support the cause.
- There are also chapters and events in other states, from Florida to California.

In 2009, the Penn State and University of Maryland chapters of Uplifting Athletes hosted events for Rare Disease Day.

In June 2010, for the first time in Uplifting Athletes History, leaders of all current chapters met in Harrisburg, Pennsylvania, at the offices of Uplifting Athletes for a conference to share ideas and learn how to improve the performance of their chapters. The student-athletes learned from industry experts and guest lecturers about such things a better decision making, budgeting, and marketing.

== Uplifting Athletes Rare Disease Champion ==
Since 2009, Uplifting Athletes has honored a member of the college football community who makes a lasting impact on the rare disease community with its Uplifting Athletes Rare Disease Champion award:

- Grant Teaff, Executive Director, American Football Coaches Association
- Ian Mitchell, quarterback for Dickinson College
- Jordan Culbreath, running back, Princeton University
- Rex Burkhead, running back, University of Nebraska–Lincoln
- Eric Shrive, offensive lineman, Penn State
- C.J. Zimmerer, fullback, University of Nebraska–Lincoln
- Sammie Coates, wide receiver, Auburn University
