= USS Shasta (AE-6) =

Ammunition ship of the United States Navy

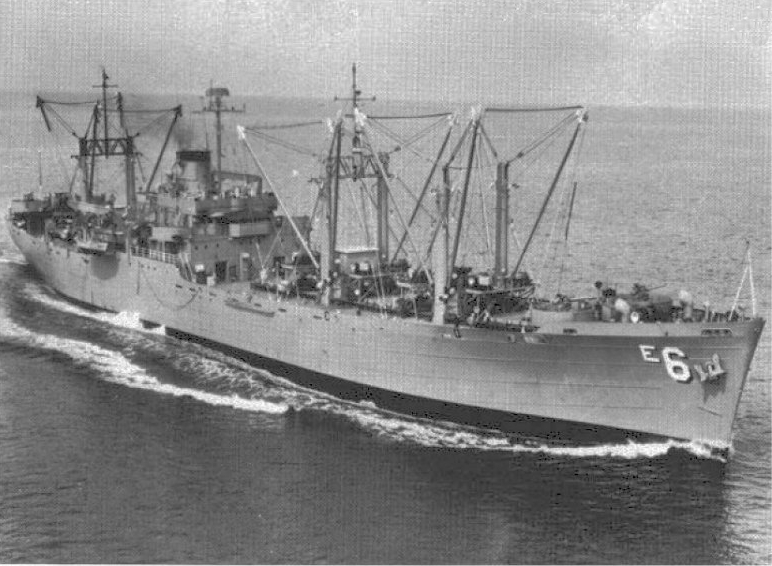
- USS Shasta (AE-6)

History

United States
- Name: USS Shasta (AE-6)
- Namesake: Mount Shasta
- Laid down: 12 August 1940
- Launched: 9 July 1941
- Acquired: 16 April 1941
- Commissioned: 20 January 1942; 15 July 1953
- Decommissioned: 10 August 1946; 1969
- Fate: Scrapped

General characteristics
- Class & type: Lassen-class ammunition ship
- Displacement: Light: 6,350 tons; Full load:13,855 tons
- Length: 459 ft (140 m)
- Beam: 63 ft (19.2 m)
- Draught: 25 ft 11 in (7.9 m)
- Propulsion: 2 x 9 cyl. Nordberg diesel engines each with 3155 brake horsepower at 225 rpm geared to 1 shaft
- Speed: 16 knots (30 km/h)
- Capacity: 5,000 deadweight tons
- Complement: 280 officers and enlisted
- Armament: 1 × single 5 in (127 mm) 38 caliber gun; 4 × single 3 in (76 mm) 50 caliber guns; 2 × twin 40 mm guns; 8 × twin 20 mm guns

USS Shasta (AE-6), an ammunition ship, was laid down under Maritime Commission contract (MC hull 125) on 12 August 1940 by the Tampa Shipbuilding Company, Tampa, Fla., initially as a C2 type cargo ship. She was acquired by the Navy on 16 April 1941 and launched on 9 July 1941, sponsored by Mrs. Spessard L. Holland. She was commissioned on 20 January 1942. She was named after Mount Shasta, a volcano in the Cascade Range in northern California, USA.

== Wartime voyages ==
On 19 November 1942, Shasta departed Alameda, Calif., for Noumea, New Caledonia, on the first of her ten wartime transpacific voyages. At the western end of each voyage, she moved from island to island replenishing the ammunition supplies of the Battle Fleet. With one exception, a deployment to Adak, Alaska, in support of the Attu and Kiska operations, Shasta's activities centered around the campaigns in the western Pacific. Her cargo supported the campaigns against the Gilberts, the Marianas, the Palaus, and the Philippines.

== Career highlights ==
The highlights of Shasta's wartime career came in 1945. In February, she participated in the first successful underway replenishment of ammunition. Later, while re-supplying the warships supporting the assault on Iwo Jima, she unloaded ammunition while under attack by Japanese shore batteries. Her most harrowing experience occurred on 5 June when she was battered by the force fourteen winds of a typhoon off the southeastern coast of Okinawa. Though her cargo had shifted and much of it had been damaged, ( 27 depth charges rolled loose on deck and 250 rounds of 16-inch projectiles broke loose and fell one deck onto 1,000-pound bombs )Shasta still managed a successful rearming rendezvous before sailing for Leyte Gulf in the Philippines. This same typhoon sank three destroyers and damaged nine others. USS Shasta survived an attack by kamikaze planes at Ulithi and drifting mines at Okinawa, at one point steering around a mine in her path.

== Leyte Gulf ==
Her cargo operations complete, Shasta departed Leyte Gulf and joined TG 30.8 on 17 July 1945. After a short replenishment cruise, she returned to Leyte Gulf for more cargo. The end of the war found Shasta taking on cargo from Victory ships. She remained at Leyte Gulf until 25 October, at which time she sailed for Puget Sound Naval Shipyard via Eniwetok Atoll. Following inactivation overhaul, she was decommissioned at San Diego on 10 August 1946.

== Recommissioned ==
After almost six years of inactivity in the Pacific Reserve Fleet, Shasta was recommissioned on 15 July 1953. Under the command of Capt. Peter M. Gaviglio, she departed San Diego on 26 November 1953 and joined the Atlantic Service Fleet at Norfolk on 12 November. At the completion of modernization overhaul at Norfolk and underway replenishment training off Newport, R.I., Shasta sailed on 7 January for her first Mediterranean deployment. For the next eleven years, she alternated between cruises with the 6th Fleet and Atlantic seaboard operations. She provided ammunition supply support to the 6th Fleet during the Jordanian crisis of May 1957 and the Lebanese crisis of August 1958.

== Special projects ==
During her assignments to the continental United States, Shasta participated in several special projects. She acted as a target ship for nuclear submarines, tested instruments on a dummy Polaris missile attached to her keel, and took part in NATO exercises. In June 1959, Shasta helped test a recently developed torpedo counter-measure known as Project "Phoenix".

On 14 September 1966, Shasta steamed out of Norfolk on a final visit to the Far East. She transited the Panama Canal on 20 September, called briefly at Pearl Harbor, and arrived at Subic Bay in the Philippines on 26 October. She remained in the Far East, either at Subic Bay or on Yankee Station, until 22 April 1967. On that day, she started her return voyage to Norfolk. Arriving at Norfolk on 8 June, Shasta completed her only circumnavigation of the globe. During this voyage, she transited the Suez Canal and stopped at Valletta, Malta; and Barcelona, Spain.

== Final deployment ==
Following overhaul, Shasta weighed anchor for what was to be her final deployment. En route to Rota, Spain, and assignment with the 6th Fleet, she was diverted to assist in the unsuccessful search for nuclear submarine, USS Scorpion (SSN-589), which was lost with all hands off the Azores. Main engine difficulties caused Shasta to cut short her projected six-month deployment and return to Norfolk for major repairs. She was placed in a reduced operating status until 1 July 1969, when her name was struck from the Navy list. On 24 March 1970, Shasta was sold to Mr. Isaac Valera of Madrid for scrapping by the Spanish company, Revalorizacionde Materials, S.A.

== Awards and honors ==
Shasta received five battle stars for World War II and one for Vietnam service.
