= USS Titania =

Cargo ship of the United States Navy

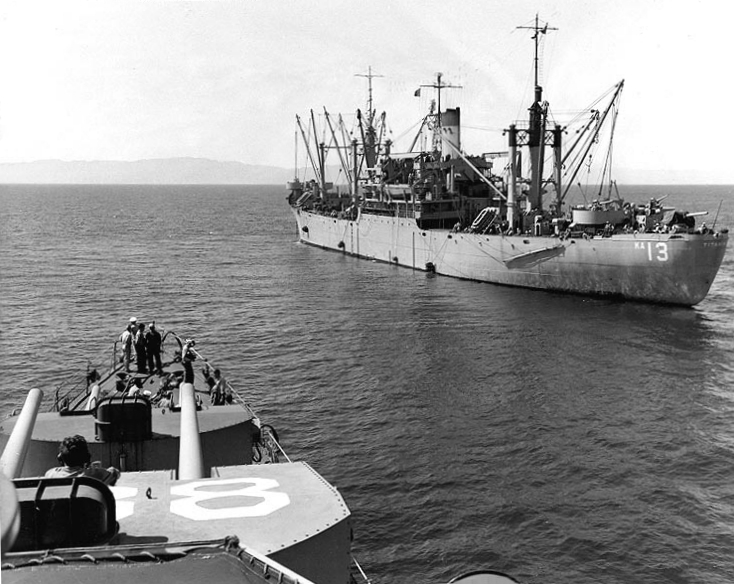
- USS Titania (AKA-13)

History

United States
- Name: USS Titania
- Namesake: Titania, the largest moon of Uranus
- Builder: Federal Shipbuilding and Drydock Company, Kearny, New Jersey
- Laid down: 25 October 1941, as Harry Culbreath
- Launched: 28 February 1942
- Commissioned: 27 May 1942, as USS Titania (AK-55)
- Decommissioned: 19 July 1955
- Reclassified: AKA-13 (Attack cargo ship), 1 February 1943
- Stricken: 1 July 1961
- Honours and awards: 6 battle stars & 7 Navy Unit Commendations (World War II); 7 battle stars (Korea)
- Fate: Sold for scrap, 10 July 1974

General characteristics
- Class & type: Arcturus-class attack cargo ship
- Type: Type C2 ship
- Displacement: 13,910 long tons (14,133 t) full
- Length: 459 ft 2 in (139.95 m)
- Beam: 63 ft (19 m)
- Draft: 26 ft 6 in (8.08 m)
- Speed: 16.5 knots (30.6 km/h; 19.0 mph)
- Complement: 266
- Armament: 1 × 5"/38 caliber gun mount; 4 × 3 in (76 mm) gun mounts; 8 × .50 cal (12.7mm) machine guns; 2 × depth charge projectors

USS Titania (AK-55/AKA-13) was an Arcturus-class attack cargo ship named after Titania, one of the moons of the planet Uranus. She served as a commissioned ship for 13 years, beginning in 1942.

== History ==
=== Launch and training exercises ===
Titania was laid down as Harry Culbreath under Maritime Commission contract (MC hull 132) on 25 October 1941 at Kearny, N.J., by the Federal Shipbuilding and Drydock Co.; renamed Titania and designated AK-55 on 16 February 1942; launched on 28 February 1942; sponsored by Mrs. Bennett Champ Clark; acquired by the United States Navy on 27 March 1942; and commissioned on 27 May 1942.

Titania began her career plying coastal waters between New York and Norfolk during the summer of 1942. On 19 September, the new cargo vessel got under way from Hampton Roads for training in Chesapeake Bay; then, in October, she conducted landing exercises to prepare for the Allied invasion of North Africa.

=== World War II service ===
==== North Africa, 1942 ====
Late in November, the Titania departed from Norfolk and steamed eastward to carry out her part in Operation Torch. As a member of the Southern Attack Group, she arrived in the transport area eight miles from Safi, Morocco, around midnight on 7 November 1942. Early in the morning, a landing craft from the Titania rescued the crew of a tank landing craft which had been destroyed by a gasoline explosion. In the afternoon, she entered Safi Harbor. Her crew began discharging vital equipment and stores; and, 78 hours later, they had unloaded her entire combat cargo. On the afternoon of 12 November the Titania, escorted by the destroyer Cole (DD-155), steaming toward Fedhala, Morocco, was attacked by the German (Kriegsmarine) U-boat U-130 but suffered from no damage. A few days later, after delivering landing craft at Fedhala, the Titania steamed home.

==== In the Pacific Theater, 1943 ====
During the first two weeks in December 1942, Titania underwent repairs and was combat loaded at Norfolk to prepare for service in the Pacific. On 17 December, she got under way from Hampton Roads in convoy, steamed through the Panama Canal on Christmas Day, and arrived at New Caledonia on 18 January. During January and February, she operated out of Nouméa making voyages to Espiritu Santo and Guadalcanal with troops and equipment for the Guadalcanal Campaign.

The Titania's reclassification as an attack cargo ship on 1 February 1943 changed her destination to AKA-13. In the following months, she continued to carry men and materiel to the Solomons. Unloading at Guadalcanal was a hazardous business because at any time, Japanese Army warplanes might appear to attack the transports or attack nearby targets ashore. Whenever this occurred, Titania got under way as her sailors raced to their general quarters stations. When the last raider disappeared, the ship pulled back into port and resumed unloading. On 5 March, while the transport was steaming from Guadalcanal to New Caledonia with a load of disabled aircraft, an unidentified plane dropped three bombs unnervingly close to her — only 10 to 20 meters astern.

On 7 April, the Titania again got under way for the Solomons. After discharging much of her cargo at Tulagi and Gavutu, the transport moved to Lunga Point to finish unloading. In May, the Titania steamed between Nouméa and Guadalcanal and made one voyage to Efate. On the 13th, the Titania witnessed an air engagement taking place over Cape Esperance as American planes intercepted Japanese raiders attempting to approach Henderson Field.

Late in May, she arrived at Wellington, New Zealand, for maintenance work in a drydock there. She returned to Nouméa on 1 July and spent almost four months shipping military equipment, stores, and troops in the waters east of Australia.

In the last week of October, the Titania departed from Guadalcanal to rehearse the coming assault on Bougainville, the northmost of the Solomon Islands. On 1 November, she took part in Operation "Cherry Blossom," the initial landing at Cape Torokina, Bougainville. Anchored off the beach, while unloading U.S. Marines and their equipment that day, the Titania twice came under air attack. During one of these raids, her guns opened up on a "Kate" which had dropped its bombs near a destroyer and then passed over the transport group. Hit by machine gun fire from the attack transport, the Japanese plane began to smoke; then splashed several miles away. By 17:40 that evening, the Titania had finished unloading, freeing her to depart from Bougainville that night and to head for Guadalcanal.

On 8 November 1943, the Titania was back at Empress Augusta Bay, Bougainville, unloading needed troops and equipment when the Japanese struck with a full-scale air raid. Shortly after noon, five different waves of three to four "Vals" each attacked the unloading transports. The Fuller (AP-14) was damaged during this attack, but the Titania escaped unscathed, despite three bombs which exploded nearby and one dud which barely missed the ship. Meanwhile, the Titania splashed five attackers and damaged at least two more.

==== In the Pacific Theater, 1944 ====
Throughout the remainder of 1943 and into the new year, the Titania continued to operate in the Solomon Islands. On 12 January 1944, she disembarked elements of the 12th Marine Regiment, as well as supplies and equipment for units of the Americal Division, then operating near Cape Torokina. After finishing the month with division tactical exercises off Tambunuman Beach, Guadalcanal, she visited New Zealand in February before ending the month with tactical and amphibious exercises out of New Caledonia. Throughout the following months, she continued ferrying men and materiel in the Solomon Islands and the Bismarck Archipelago. She stopped at Kwajalein early in June and, later that month, set her course for the Marshall Islands.

With elements of the 3rd Marine Division embarked, the Titania got under way from Eniwetok on 17 July, bound for the assault on Guam. At 06:06 on the 21st, the Titania was lying to in the transport area six miles off Asan Point. Minutes later, she hoisted out her landing craft; and, at 08:30, the first wave of the 3rd Marine Division landed on the northwest shore of Guam between Asan and Adelup Points. The Titania began unloading cargo shortly before 10:00 and, for the next four days, discharged vital war supplies, including ammunition, to support American fighting men in the bitter struggle taking place on shore. On 26 July, she departed from Guam and set her course for Eniwetok Atoll arriving there on 30 July.

In September, the Titania operated out of New Guinea where the U.S. Seventh Fleet was preparing for the coming assault on the Philippines. Early in October, she participated in exercises with Transport Division 6. Then, on Friday, 13 October, she headed for Humboldt Bay, the staging area for the impending invasion of Leyte. Assigned to the Palo Attack Group, the Titania entered Leyte Gulf on the morning of 20 October. At 08:45, the Titania began releasing her boats which carried supplies and equipment for the U.S. Army's 24th Infantry Division. At 14:00, she approached within two miles of the beach to facilitate unloading. Later in the afternoon, as the Army's Light Tanker No. 425 came alongside the Titania to help her unload, one of the tanker's machine guns accidentally discharged, shooting about 100 holes in the Titania's side and severing her degaussing cable in two places, but no serious damage resulted. On the next day, after discharging over 1,000 tons of cargo, the Titania departed from Leyte Gulf, returning to New Guinea on the 27th.

After loading cargo at Humboldt Bay for the 32nd Infantry Division, she got under way on 9 November in company with a 25-transport convoy steaming for Leyte. On 13 November, the Japanese launched four air raids at the convoy. During one of these attacks, a "Jill" torpedo bomber dove out of a cloud and levelled off at 100 feet for an approach. The Titania joined in the firing which soon splashed the raider. On the morning of 14 November, the ship arrived in San Pedro Bay. During the day, she unloaded supplies and equipment of the 32nd Division and also splashed a Japanese plane which sank only 1,500 meters off her starboard bow. On 15 November, she finished discharging her cargo and departed. Early in December 1944, the Titania took part in exercises in Huon Gulf, New Guinea, then anchored in Seeadler Harbor, Manus Island. On the last day of the year, she got under way from Manus and steamed for the Philippines in company with the Luzon Attack Force.

==== In the Pacific Theater, 1945 ====
In the days which followed, Japan launched mass kamikaze attacks to deter this formidable invasion force. On 6 January 1945, combat air patrol (CAP) planes shot down a Japanese plane just 1,000 meters from the Titania's port bow. Air activity picked up two days later as the convoy's CAP downed four planes. A "Val" approached from Titania's port quarter, crossed her stern, and dropped one bomb 100 meters from the ship's port quarter and another only 50 meters off her starboard bow. The Titania and other members of the convoy had taken the plane under continuous fire and finally splashed it only 100 meters off her starboard bow.

On 9 January, as the Titania anchored off Crimson Beach, the Lingayen Gulf landings began. Despite a heavy cross-swell which made unloading difficult, the Titania serviced small craft and discharged her cargo of vehicles, ammunition, and gasoline, as well as personnel. On the 18th, she got under way for the Netherlands East Indies where she loaded supplies and equipment of the 33rd Infantry Division. Throughout February and March, she continued to support ground forces in the Philippines.

On 17 April, the Titania began loading supplies and equipment for the Australian 26th Infantry Brigade (Reinforced). She got underway on 27 April for the assault on Tarakan Island and arrived off Yellow Beach on P-day, 1 May. The Titania's first shore parties discovered soft, sticky, mud beaches and a 10-foot tidal range, both of which slowed and hampered unloading efforts. Finding the pier badly burned but its supporting structure intact, the Titania sent a work party ashore to obtain logs to restore the pier to usable condition. Seventy tons of bridge planking from the transport's hold completed the repair job and made it possible for trucks to load from the pier at four hatches. Under these improved conditions, the Titania discharged the materials, engineering equipment, and supplies needed to construct and operate an airfield at Tarakan by the 9th. She retired toward Morotai that day, and then she remained at anchor there throughout the rest of the month.

In early June, the Titania was again under way, this time with elements of the 9th Division of the Australian I Corps on board, bound for Brunei Bay. On 10 June, Z-day, the transport arrived off the "Oboe Six" assault area and unloaded her cargo despite a surprise air attack by a Japanese "Nick" which dove out of low clouds and dropped a bomb which exploded some 300 meters off her port beam. The Titania departed from Brunei Bay on the following afternoon.

After loading an Australian division at Morotai, the Titania engaged in rehearsals for the coming reoccupation of Balikpapan. She arrived off the coast of Borneo on 1 July to unload units of the Australian I Corps and members of Company "A," United States Engineering Boat and Shore Regiment. Anchored in the transport area, the ship did not come under fire, although her landing boats were fired on by mortars and machine guns as they landed their cargoes on Red Beach. The Titania unloaded 575 tonnes of cargo, including high explosives, and departed from Balikpapan at 1930 hours the same day.

Throughout the remainder of July, the Titania sat at anchor at Morotai. On 30 July, she got under way, and then she visited San Pedro Bay, Leyte, and Ulithi in the Caroline Islands before steaming for the Hawaiian Islands. At Pearl Harbor, she took aboard Landing Vehicle Trackeds (LVT)s for shipment to the United States, took aboard military personnel, and departed on 22 August.

=== Interwar operations ===
After more than two and one-half years in foreign waters, the veteran arrived at Bremerton, Washington, on 30 August for overhaul which lasted through the end of October.

In the early months of 1946, Titania operated out of California ports, then steamed to Samar, arriving on 1 March. She remained in the Philippines until May when she returned to the west coast for repairs. Throughout the next two years, she continued to shuttle between the west coast of the United States and the islands of the Pacific, carrying cargoes to occupation forces. In September 1948, she departed Pearl Harbor and proceeded via the Panama Canal to the east coast, arriving at Yorktown, Va., on 6 November. She again passed through the Panama Canal in December en route to Eniwetok, Guam, and Saipan. On 16 March 1949, she arrived at San Francisco and remained through the spring and summer, operating in coastal and Alaskan waters.

In October 1949, she was assigned to the Military Sea Transportation Service, but retained her commissioned status and Navy crew.

=== Korean War ===
When fighting broke out in Korea on 25 June 1950, Titania was at Yokohama. Early in July, she carried troops, cargo and the 8055th M.A.S.H. unit from Naha to Pusan, docking there 7 July; then returned to Japan to embark marines and troops of the 1st Cavalry Division for the assault on Pohang. Underway on 16 July, the darkened ship crossed the Japanese Inland Sea and passed between Kyūshū and Honshū through the Shimonoseki Strait, arriving off the assault area at 04:15 on 18 July. Debarkation was uneventful; and, by 22:25, her landing craft had returned to the ship, their mission completed. Titania remained anchored at Geitjetsu Wan until 23 July when she got under way for Yokosuka.

Following the Pohang operation, the transport returned to the United States, arriving at San Diego on 7 August. There, she began taking on ammunition and marine cargo; but in the early hours of 15 August, before the loading had been completed, a fire broke out in her number 1 boiler. Within three hours, the fire was brought under control, but the damage incurred required two weeks of repairs. It was 3 September before Titania got under way for Japan. As she crossed the Pacific, she skirted Typhoon Missatha, encountering 53-knot (98 km/h; 61 mph) winds before she arrived at Kobe on 21 September.

On 25 September, only 10 days after the initial landings at Inchon, Titania arrived off that port to unload marines, equipment, and ammunition, and to embark members of the 1st Naval Beach Group. Although Titania did not come under fire, frequent alerts and the sights and sounds of night shore bombardment made this a tense operation. Her mission completed, Titania departed Inchon on 1 October. She made additional voyages to Inchon and Wonsan carrying combat cargo before getting under way from Yokohama on 17 November 1950 for San Francisco.

=== After the Korean War and decommissioning ===
Until the signing of the armistice on 27 July 1953, the Titania continued to carry men and cargo between American ports and the Orient. Much of her time was spent rearming and provisioning ships at sea in the waters off Korea. Rough seas, rain, and snow hampered the ship's operations during the winter months, taxing the resilience and resourcefulness of her crew on many occasions. Following the cessation of hostilities in the summer of 1953, Titania remained in the Far East operating out of Japanese ports and in Korean waters until February 1954 when she returned to San Francisco.

On 15 July 1954, the Titania departed San Francisco steaming, via the Hawaiian Islands and Japan, for the Philippines. She operated out of Subic Bay until October when she visited Hong Kong and Sasebo before getting under way from Japan on 6 November. After spending the early months of 1955 in California ports, Titania was decommissioned on 19 July 1955. Her name was struck from the Navy List on 1 July 1961 and she was sold for scrap to China Trade & Development Corp. on 10 July 1974.

== Ship Awards ==

Navy Unit Commendation (7 Awards)
China Service Medal	American Campaign Medal	Asiatic-Pacific Campaign Medal with 6 Campaign Stars
European-African-Middle East Campaign Medal with Campaign Star	World War II Victory Medal	Navy Occupation Service Medal
National Defense Service Medal	Korean Service Medal with 7 Campaign Stars	Philippine Presidential Unit Citation
Philippine Liberation Medal with 2 Campaign Stars	United Nations Service Medal	Republic of Korea War Service Medal
