= MS Sea Witch =

1940 cargo ship

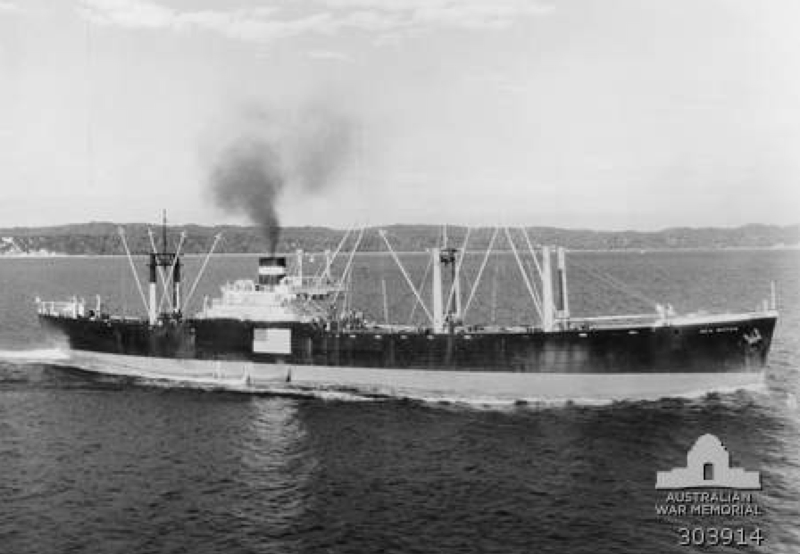
- Sea Witch in Australian waters on 5 August 1941

History
- Name: Sea Witch
- Owner: United States Maritime Commission
- Operator: United States Lines
- Port of registry: (United States) New York
- Builder: Tampa Shipbuilding & Engineering Company, Tampa, Florida
- Completed: July 1940
- Acquired: delivered 30 July 1940
- Maiden voyage: 15 August 1940 from New York
- Identification: US official number 239681; call sign WEVO
- Fate: Scrapped

General characteristics
- Class & type: Maritime Commission type C2 cargo
- Tonnage: 6,021 GRT, 3,559 NRT
- Length: 438 ft 3 in (133.6 m)
- Beam: 63 ft 2 in (19.3 m)
- Draft: 27 ft 5 in (8.4 m)
- Installed power: 2 300kw Westinghouse direct current generators driven by 2 direct-connected 6-cylinder 450hp Superior diesel engines.
- Propulsion: 2 × 9 cyl. Nordberg diesel engines each with 3155 brake horsepower at 225 rpm geared to 1 shaft
- Speed: 16
- Capacity: 1,567 — 1,907 troops; 225,000 cu ft (6,371.3 m^{3})
- Crew: 41

MS Sea Witch (Note: Lloyd's and most references are clear the name is Sea Witch but what is clearly the same ship, particularly with regard to delivery of aircraft to Java, may be found in both DANFS and Gill's history as Seawitch. Gill uses Seawitch in his 1957 first volume and corrects it to Sea Witch in the 1968 second volume.) was a United States Maritime Commission type C2 cargo ship, the first of four pre-war hulls, built by Tampa Shipbuilding & Engineering Company, Tampa, Florida and delivered in July 1940. The ship was of the basic C2 design, rather than the more numerous C2-S, C2-S-A1, C2-S-B1 types and four C2-T hulls delivered December 1941 through March 1942. Sea Witch was one of the relatively few C2 types built with diesel engines.

== Construction ==
Sea Witch was the first of eight C2 type motor ships of a series constructed by Tampa Shipbuilding & Engineering Company, Tampa, Florida powered by twin Nordberg diesels. The ship was delivered to the US Maritime Commission for sea trials 30 July 1940.

== Commercial service ==
The ship was delivered to United States Lines to operate under charter with option to purchase from the Maritime Commission for operation on the New York, Baltimore, Philadelphia, Hampton Roads and Savannah direct cargo service to Manila, Shanghai and Hong Kong by their American Pioneer Line intended to be the fastest direct cargo service between the United States' East Coast and the Far East. On 15 August 1940 Sea Witch departed New York under the command of Captain Samuel Lee on her maiden voyage. On 23 January 1941, after the ship exceeded all guarantees during her first voyage, United States Lines announced the ship would be purchased.

== War service ==
Sea Witch was requisitioned by the War Shipping Administration (WSA) on 26 January 1942 at Port Pirie, South Australia from United States Lines and allocated to the United States Army under a Transportation Corps agreement with United States Lines as operator. Shortly thereafter Sea Witch successfully delivered fighter planes to Java in a failing effort to reinforce Allied forces there resisting the Japanese invasion of the Dutch East Indies.

Sea Witch, with twenty-seven disassembled and crated P-40 fighters aboard, departed Fremantle, Australia on 22 February 1942 in Convoy MS.5 that was bound for Colombo, Ceylon with troops and supplies eventually destined for India and Burma. The convoy was composed of Sea Witch, seaplane tender (and former aircraft carrier) USS Langley (carrying 32 assembled P-40s on her short flight deck), the Australian transports Katoomba and Duntroon, and the United States Army Transport Willard A. Holbrook, escorted by the light cruiser USS Phoenix. The convoy was loaded with troops, supplies and aircraft originally intended for the Philippines, that had been delivered to Australia earlier by SS Mariposa and SS President Coolidge, escorted by Phoenix.

En route to Colombo Sea Witch and Langley were ordered to break with the convoy and proceed independently to deliver the aircraft to Tjilatjap in Java. The two ships proceeded north separately, but Langley was attacked and sunk by Japanese land-based bombers on 27 February, despite being escorted by two American destroyers sent from Tilatjap. Sea Witch arrived at Tjilatjap on 28 February, even as the results of the Battle of the Java Sea had sealed the fate of the islands, and unloaded the aircraft. However, the still-disassembled aircraft were later destroyed by Allied forces to deny them to the enemy. On departure for Australia the ship embarked forty refugee soldiers.

The ship was listed as part of the original Southwest Pacific Area Command's (SWPA) in-theater fleet and is shown as one of seven ships in the United States Army Forces In Australia (USAFIA) fleet and one of three assigned for an indefinite period. By late April 1942 General MacArthur reported he had twenty-eight vessels composed of twenty-one Dutch KPM ships and seven others including Sea Witch which was one of the vessels under WSA charter from the owners. The need for large ocean voyage capable ships was acute and SWPA's need was for smaller, shallow draft vessels for operation in reef-strewn waters and poorly developed ports, and Sea Witch was detached from the SWPA fleet in March, though still operating in the region. At some point the ship was converted to a troop transport with capacity for 1,907 troops.

The ship departed Townsville, Australia on 2 September 1942 with Convoy P2 bound for Port Moresby, New Guinea, in company with the Australian troop ship Taroona, along with Convoy Q2 comprising two cargo ships Anshun and 's Jacob, escorted by HMAS Swan and HMAS Castlemaine. Q2 split off south of Port Moresby and proceeded east to Milne Bay where Anshun would be sunk.

On 21 December 1942 the nature of the WSA charter was changed at San Francisco from Transportation Corps to a bareboat general agency agreement, still with United States Lines as operator, for more general service. The ship was allocated by WSA to Army troop transport requirements.

On 28 March 1943, the ship departed San Francisco bound for Suva, Fiji Islands arriving on 13 April, 1943.

On 21 September 1943 Sea Witch departed Port Hueneme, California with over 1,000 officers and men of the 91st Naval Construction Battalion bound for Milne Bay, New Guinea and after a brief stop in Australia arrived on 21 October 1943 with the next five days spent unloading. (Note: The 91st Naval Construction Battalion history specifically mentions "left Port Hueneme on 21 September 1943 aboard the U.S. Army Transport Sea Witch" indicating long term Army allocation.)

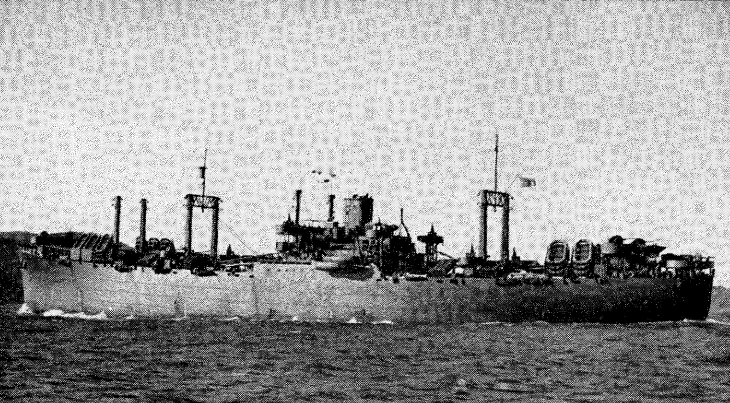
Sea Witch in 1947

== Post war ==
Sea Witch was returned to the Maritime Commission 24 June 1946 and laid-up at James River Reserve Fleet having made her last voyage into the port of New York. Sea Witch was sold from the reserve fleet to Dichmann, Wright & Pugh, Inc. on 25 April 1947 and then resold to Caribbean Land & Shipping Corporation on 8 May 1947 at Hoboken, New Jersey.

The ship eventually was sold to the Swedish company Rederi AB Pulp and renamed Axel Salen sailing under the Swedish flag. In 1950 the two main engines and two auxiliary engines were completely overhauled in San Francisco by West Winds, Inc. which had acquired the facilities of General Engineering and Dry Dock Corporation. All pistons were pulled, completely refurbished with parts replaced if necessary. The port engine required a new block.

In 1951 the ship was sold and renamed Bastasen and again the same year renamed' Warszawa.

== See also ==
- Battle of Java (1942)
