= Tampa Shipbuilding Company =

Former shipbuilder in Florida, U.S.

Coordinates: 27.943955°N 82.441188°W

Tampa Shipbuilding Company, or TASCO, was one of a number of shipyards in Tampa, Florida. It operated from 1917 to after World War II, closing in 1947. The site is now Gulf Marine Repair which operates with floating dry docks.

== History ==
=== Origins ===
Originally Tampa Shipbuilding & Engineering Company, founded in 1917, the yard built ships under the United States Maritime Commission's pre-war long-range shipbuilding program. It was also called the Tampa Shipbuilding & Dry Dock Company. It would use the facilities of the Tampa Foundry & Machine Co. Tampa Foundry that ceased to exist in 1916. The Tampa Foundry was established in 1892 and was later incorporated in 1905.

=== World War II mobilization ===
The company borrowed $750,000 in 1938 from the Public Works Administration to help pay for the construction of a 10,000-ton dry dock that was being built. After the dry dock was constructed, in 1939, they were awarded a contract worth $8 million to build four cargo ships. The growth in the shipyard resulted in about 2,000 new jobs being created and helped to combat unemployment in the city. The company ended up only producing one of the ships in the contract, MS Sea Witch as the company announced it was in bad financial shape.

As a result of the company going into a bad financial state, the Maritime Commission and Reconstruction Finance Corporation (that had assumed the PWA loan) tried to find new owners for the company, replacing Ernest Kreher. George B. Howell, who worked for the Exchange National Bank, was encouraged by this to buy the company for $500. Howell was charged by the US Accounting Office with illegally selling ships and overcharging the US Navy, but was never prosecuted. The shipyard was renamed to Tampa Shipbuilding Company (TASCO) after it was sold.

=== World War II activities ===
During the war, TASCO was one of four other shipyards in Tampa. The other three being: Bushnell-Lyons; Tampa Marine; and Hooker's Point Yard, started by Matthew H. McCloskey, Junior. TASCO was the largest company that existed. A company newspaper published during World War II was titled the Tascozette.

African American workers who worked in shipyards were usually excluded from joining local unions as it was common during that time period to not accept them. Those in the shipyard who were African American usually worked as cooks, assistants, janitors and learners which were some of the only job positions they could take. The jobs available to African American workers were not unionized in general. The accomplishments of African American workers were rarely if never highlighted in the company newspapers of the shipyards in Tampa. 17% of workers at the shipyard were female making it twice the rate it was at the national level.

Apart from doing work at the shipyard during World War II, recreational activities were also provided for workers there. A bowling, softball and basketball league was created at the shipyard. Eventually a swim club and fencing club would be established along with volleyball, tennis and badminton would also being introduced. A radio program would be created by the management of the shipyard. An RCA recording would be broadcast from the Morale Department located in the yard originally being an hour long program at noon. The radio program would be expanded in October 1944 and would also include songs requested by employees.

==== Ships built during World War II ====
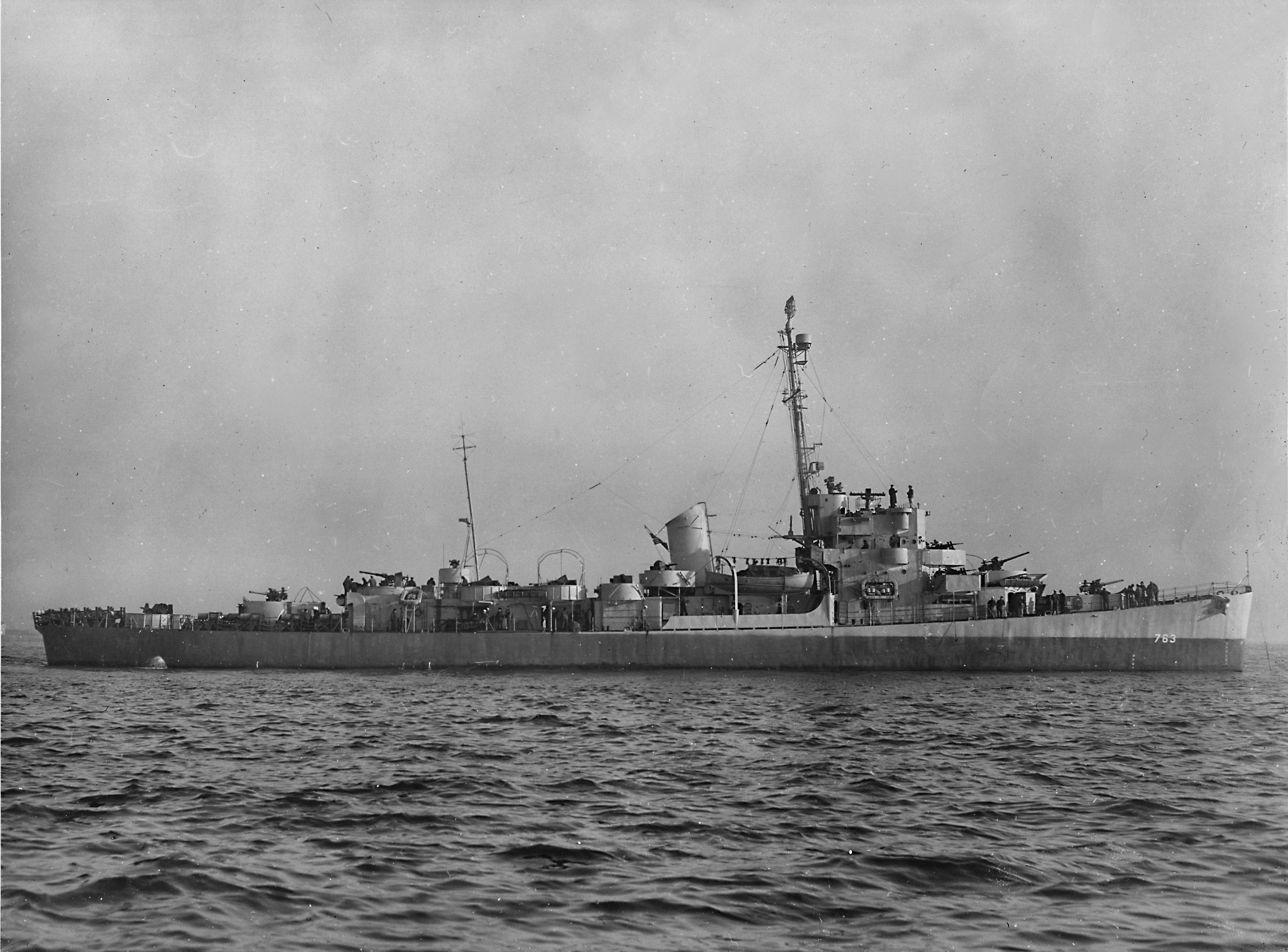
USS Cates

Immediately before and during the United States entry into the Second World War the company built US Navy auxiliaries. Tampa Shipbuilding built: Admirable-class minesweepers and Type C2 cargo ships, like USS Lassen, USS Mauna Loa and MS Sea Witch, which gained some note in a last attempt to deliver U.S. Army planes to Java, though the twenty-seven crated P-40s had to be destroyed after delivered to prevent them from falling into Japanese hands. During the war TASCO also built Cannon-class destroyer escorts like USS Cates, USS Sutton and USS Slater. At its peak, it was the largest employer in Tampa, employing 16,000 people. Tampa Shipbuilding closed after the war in 1947, and few traces remain of its facilities.

- 9 of 72 Cannon-class destroyer escorts
  - Cates (DE-763) ... Sutton (DE-771)
  - plus 3 launched, cancelled and scrapped (772, 773, 774)
- 24 of 123 Admirable-class minesweeper
  - Admirable (AM-136) ... Bombard (AM-151)
  - Crag (AM-214) ... Diploma (AM-221)
- 3 of 5 Dixie-class destroyer tenders
  - Piedmont (AD-17) ... Yosemite (AD-19)
- 7 of 7 Lassen-class ammunition ships (C2)
  - Lassen (AE-3) ... Shasta (AE-6), Mauna Loa (AE-8), Mazama (AE-9), Akutan (AE-13)
- 1 of 10 Portunus-class motor boat tenders
  - Varuna (AGP-5)
- 2 of 2 Amphion-class repair ships
  - Amphion (AR-13), Cadmus (AR-14)
- 3 of 11 Arcturus-class attack cargo ships
  - Procyon (AKA-2) ... Electra (AKA-4)
- 4 of 11 Acubens-class stores ships (conversions only)
  - Luna (AKS-7) ... Cybele (AKS-10)
- Edward Rutledge (APA-52) (conversion only)
- APL-53 to APL-56
