= Jordan Culbreath =

American football player

Princeton Tigers
- Position: Running back

Career information
- College: Princeton

Jordan Culbreath is a former running back for the Princeton Tigers, a college American football team. Culbreath was diagnosed his junior year with aplastic anemia, and gained recognition for not only surviving the disease, but coming back to play his senior year.

== College achievements ==
Culbreath's major at Princeton was mechanical and aerospace engineering, and he and a classmate invented a cold-water filtration system that the Princeton athletic department now uses, saving thousands of dollars in ice costs.

His junior year, before his diagnosis, Culbreath rushed for 1206 yards and was unanimously selected to the all-Ivy League first team.

== Illness ==
During a game, Culbreath suffered an injury to his ankle, which led to further investigation and the diagnosis of two separate diseases. Treatment for aplastic anemia, an often-fatal disease, requires donor tissue; this was complicated by Culbreath's ethnicity, which includes African ancestry on his father's side and European and Japanese ancestry on his mother's side. Yet remarkably, he successfully battled the disease and was able to return for his senior year.

In acknowledging Culbreath's achievements, Uplifting Athletes honored him with their Uplifting Athletes Rare Disease Champion award for 2011, and Director A.D Pearson filmed Running Through: The Jordan Culbreath Story, a documentary telling Culbreath's story.
