= USS Arcturus (AKA-1) =

Cargo ship of the United States Navy

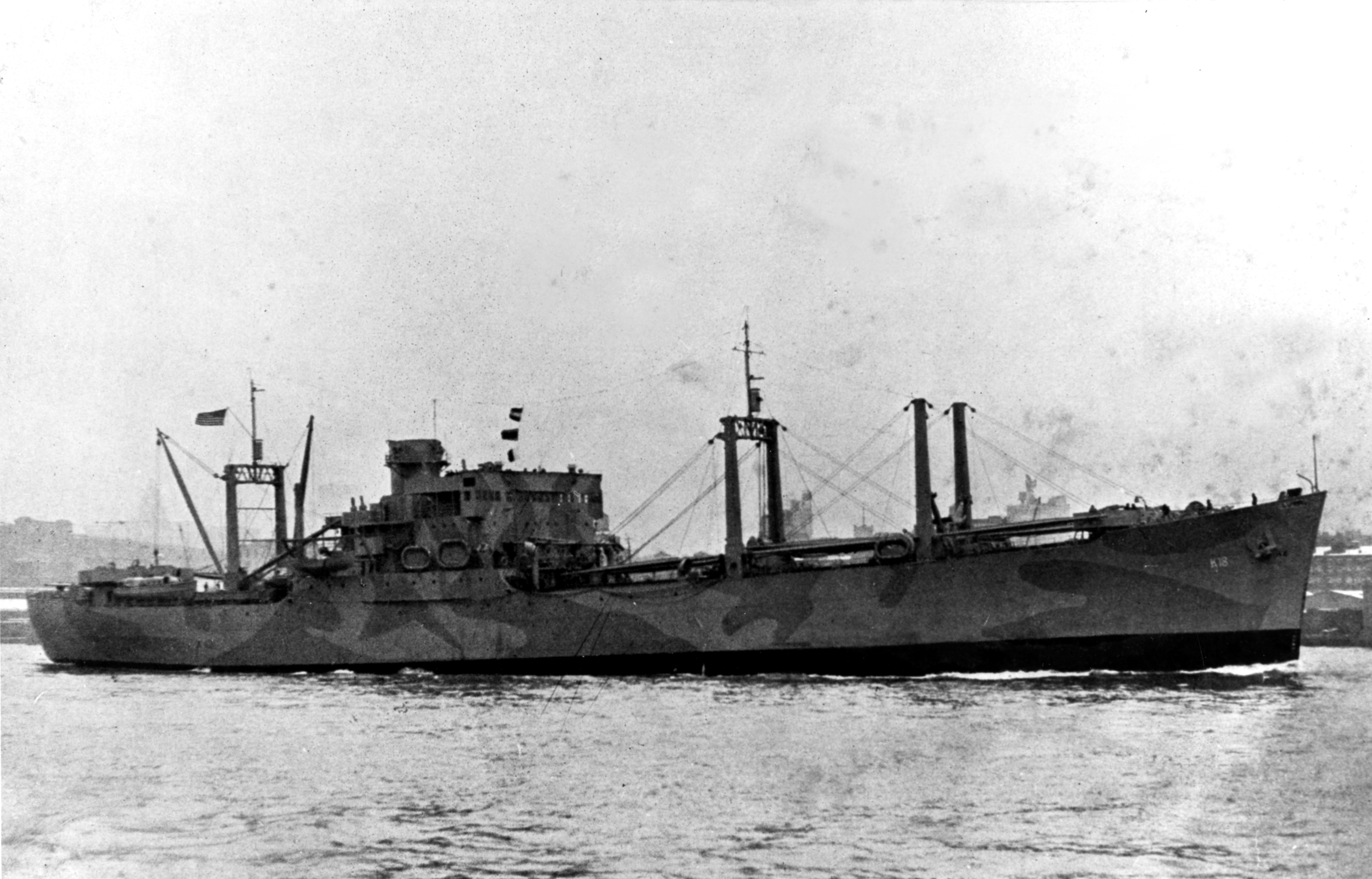
- USS Arcturus (AKA-1)

History

United States
- Name: USS Arcturus
- Namesake: Arcturus, a star in the constellation Boötes
- Builder: Sun Shipbuilding & Drydock Co., Chester, Pennsylvania
- Laid down: 26 July 1938, as Mormachawk
- Launched: 18 May 1939
- Acquired: 20 September 1940
- Commissioned: 26 October 1940, as USS Arcturus (AK-18)
- Decommissioned: 3 April 1946
- Reclassified: AKA-1 (attack cargo ship), 1 February 1943
- Stricken: 5 June 1946
- Fate: Sold into commercial service as SS Arcturus; Scrapped in 1971

General characteristics
- Class & type: Arcturus-class attack cargo ship
- Type: Type C2 ship
- Displacement: 14,225 long tons (14,453 t)
- Length: 459 ft 1 in (139.93 m)
- Beam: 63 ft (19 m)
- Draft: 26 ft 5 in (8.05 m)
- Speed: 16.5 knots (30.6 km/h; 19.0 mph)
- Complement: 267
- Armament: 1 × 5-inch/38-caliber gun mount; 4 × 40 mm gun mounts

Service record
- Operations: Invasion of North Africa (1942); Invasion of Sicily (1943); Salerno Landings (1943); Landings in southern France (1944); Battle of Okinawa (1945)
- Awards: 5 battle stars

USS Arcturus (AK-18/AKA-1) was an Arcturus-class attack cargo ship named after Arcturus, a star in the constellation Boötes. She served as a commissioned ship for 5 years and 5 months.

== Service history ==
Arcturus was laid down as Mormachawk on 26 July 1938 under a Maritime Commission contract (MC hull 19) by the Sun Shipbuilding & Dry Dock Co., Hull 176 at Chester, Pennsylvania. The ship was launched on 18 May 1939, sponsored by Miss Mollie Foulks Lee, and delivered to Moore McCormack Lines, Inc. on 27 July 1939. Acquired by the Navy on 20 September 1940, she was converted to a cargo ship at the Philadelphia Navy Yard, and commissioned on 26 October 1940 as Arcturus (AK-18).

=== North Africa ===
The cargo ship began her Navy career with two years of general auxiliary duty operating out of ports along the east coast as far north as NS Argentia, Newfoundland, and south to San Juan, Puerto Rico. In October 1942, Arcturus received orders to load landing craft and join the Western Naval Task Force (Task Force (TF) 34) in the invasion of North Africa. The cargo ship was assigned to Transport Division (TransDiv) 9 of the Center Attack Group and sailed from Hampton Roads on 24 October. Arcturus arrived off Fedhala, French Morocco, just before midnight on 7 November, with the landing scheduled for daybreak on the 8th. The ship's boats moved troops ashore at H-hour, but to facilitate unloading her cargo, she moved into the harbor later in the day just long enough to unload at the one usable pier.

Arcturus was still anchored off Fedhala on 12 November when the German submarine U-130 attacked. Arcturus escaped, but three other auxiliaries were destroyed. The cargo ship's boats rescued survivors before the Center Group got underway to avoid more submarine attacks. The ships entered Casablanca on 15 November, and Arcturus completed unloading her cargo of small arms ammunition.

The ship joined a convoy on 17 November and returned to the United States, where she entered the Norfolk Navy Yard at Portsmouth, Virginia, for an overhaul that lasted until 18 December. Arcturus got underway from Norfolk on 27 December and joined a convoy carrying urgently needed supplies to the southwestern Pacific. Stopping first at Nouméa, New Caledonia, on 27 January 1943 and then at Brisbane, Australia, four days later, Arcturus returned to the east coast immediately. Redesignated as an attack cargo ship AKA-1 on 1 February, she then underwent a repair availability at the Boston Navy Yard, from 13 March until 4 April. The ship then trained off the east coast with TF 85 in preparation for the Allied invasion of Sicily.

=== Invasion of Sicily ===
Arcturus crossed the Atlantic and formed up at Oran, Algeria, with the transports and escorts of "Cent" force under Rear Admiral Alan G. Kirk. By 8 July, the convoy was underway for Scoglitti, Sicily, where TF 85 was to land as part of a three-pronged attack. H-hour was set for 0245 on 10 July, but delays in organizing the convoy postponed the landing for one hour. As the first waves of boats moved toward the beaches, enemy torpedo bombers attacked. For almost an hour, torpedoes and bombs fell throughout the transport area, but neither Arcturus nor any other ship suffered hits. Landing craft casualties were great, however, because of the heavy surf, lack of recognizable landmarks, and inexperienced boat crews. During the night of 11 July and 12 July, another enemy air attack resulted in chaos as the transports and screening ships tried to defend themselves. American transport planes flew over immediately after the attack and were shot up badly by friendly fire. Unloading continued, and by the 13th, Arcturus was on her way back to Oran with the rest of the empty transports.

=== Salerno ===
The cargo ship remained at Oran while plans were firmed up for the landings at Salerno. On 5 September, Arcturus got underway with TF.81, the Southern Attack Force, under the command of Rear Admiral John L. Hall. In spite of repeated enemy air attacks, the convoys arrived off the Gulf of Salerno late on 8 September. By 0335 the next day, the first wave of boats was landing at Paestum. Unfortunately, in the hope of completely surprising the Germans, no prelanding bombardment preceded the boats, and many men in the landing craft were killed.

The unloading progressed slowly as Arcturus's boats helped move troops and supplies shoreward. One of her boats was lost in crossfire from German machine gun emplacements, with seven men killed and four wounded. By the evening of 10 September, unloading was complete. Arcturus and 14 other empty cargo and transport ships sailed for Oran with an escort of 10 destroyers. Shortly after midnight, screening destroyer Rowan (DD-405) sighted a torpedo wake and pursued what was later determined to be a German E-boat. She lost it, and, as she rejoined the convoy, was hit by a torpedo from another E-boat and sank within one minute. The rest of the ships in the convoy proceeded to Oran without incident.

Arcturus remained at anchor off the coast of Algeria until November when she steamed to the recently captured and cleared port of Naples for amphibious training. In December, the cargo ship joined a westbound convoy and sailed for the United States. High winds and heavy Atlantic seas tossed Arcturus unmercifully, causing a fire in the pyrotechnic locker and the loss of 5 inch ammunition on the after gundeck. For two days, the convoy fought the seas, but at last the storm broke, and the ships arrived safely in the United States, Arcturus put into the Philadelphia Navy Yard on 2 January 1944 and commenced a brief overhaul.

=== Landings in southern France ===
The cargo ship set sail on 27 February to rejoin the war effort in the Mediterranean. After several rehearsals at Salerno for the amphibious landings in southern France, Arcturus joined TF 85, the "Delta" Force in this operation, and stood off the designated beaches at La Nartelle on 15 August, awaiting H-hour, 0800. The assault progressed like a textbook drill due to excellent gunfire support, air cover, and experienced boat crews. The landing was unopposed. There were no casualties and no loss of landing craft

Just as Arcturus weighed anchor to retire from the transport area, she received orders to take on wounded, mainly German prisoners of war. The cargo ship slipped out under cover of darkness and rejoined her convoy en route to Naples to discharge her passengers. Until late October, Arcturus carried cargo from Naples and Oran to Marseille and Saint-Tropez as the Allies advanced up the Rhône river valley. Released from this assignment on 21 October, the cargo ship returned to the United States for overhaul at the Philadelphia Navy Yard beginning on 10 November.

=== Battle of Okinawa ===
Arcturus completed overhaul in mid-December and set course to join the action in the Pacific theater. Transiting the Panama Canal on 9 January 1945, the cargo ship arrived at Pearl Harbor on 23 January and immediately unloaded her cargo. As soon as a new load was stowed on board, Arcturus got underway for Tulagi and Guadalcanal for training, rehearsals, and loading. She then steamed to Ulithi where she joined Transport Group "Baker" of the Northern Attack Force for the invasion of Okinawa. On 26 March, the ships stood out of Ulithi lagoon and set course for Okinawa.

Arcturus anchored at her assigned location in the transport area off the Hagushi beaches in the early hours of 1 April, but waited five days before she could unload her cargo of gasoline and small arms ammunition. The transports and cargo ships retired seaward at night to minimize the clangor from kamikaze attacks. Many other ships were hit, but in her 14 days in the transport area, Arcturus suffered no damage. The cargo ship's gun crews were credited with two assists in shooting down enemy attackers.

On 15 April, Arcturus received orders to Saipan where she was routed on to Pearl Harbor and San Francisco, arriving at the latter port on 18 May. After loading cargo and supplies, Arcturus returned to the western Pacific to resupply the troops advancing on Okinawa. After a brief stop at Eniwetok on 11 June, the cargo ship dropped anchor at Okinawa on 5 August. Enemy air attacks continued, but less frequently and with decreasing intensity. On 15 August, when Japan capitulated, Arcturus was still at Okinawa. She was then assigned to ferry occupation forces to Korea and China. On 5 September, the ship departed Okinawa in a convoy carrying Army troops and cargo to Jinsen, Korea. The convoy arrived at Jinsen on 8 September, and the occupation troops were joyfully received by the Koreans.

Arcturus returned to Okinawa to load more cargo and troops but had to steam seaward to avoid a typhoon. Finally, on 19 September, she was again loaded with Marines and vehicles in convoy to Tientsin, China, where she anchored on 30 September. Arcturus ferried troops and equipment from Manila and Zamboanga in the Philippine Islands to China before receiving orders stateside.

== Decommissioning and sale ==
The cargo ship got underway on 4 December from Shanghai, China, for Seattle, Washington, where she arrived on 22 December. No longer needed for service, Arcturus steamed to Portsmouth, Virginia, where she was decommissioned on 3 April 1946. Her name was struck from the Navy List on 5 June 1946. She was transferred to the Maritime Commission for disposal, and was sold to a Panamanian company on 24 June 1947. She began merchant service as SS Star Arcturus, and was scrapped in 1971.

== Honors and awards ==
- Combat Action Ribbon
- China Service Medal
- American Defense Service Medal with "A" device
- American Campaign Medal
- European–African–Middle Eastern Campaign Medal with four battle stars for World War II service
- Asiatic-Pacific Campaign Medal with one battle star for World War II service
- World War II Victory Medal
- Navy Occupation Service Medal with "ASIA" clasp

== In media ==
Many scenes in the first episode ("Cocoon") of the American television series Hawaii Five-O were filmed aboard Arcturus. The episode premiered on American television on 20 September 1968.
