= Arcturus-class attack cargo ship =

Type of American attack cargo ship

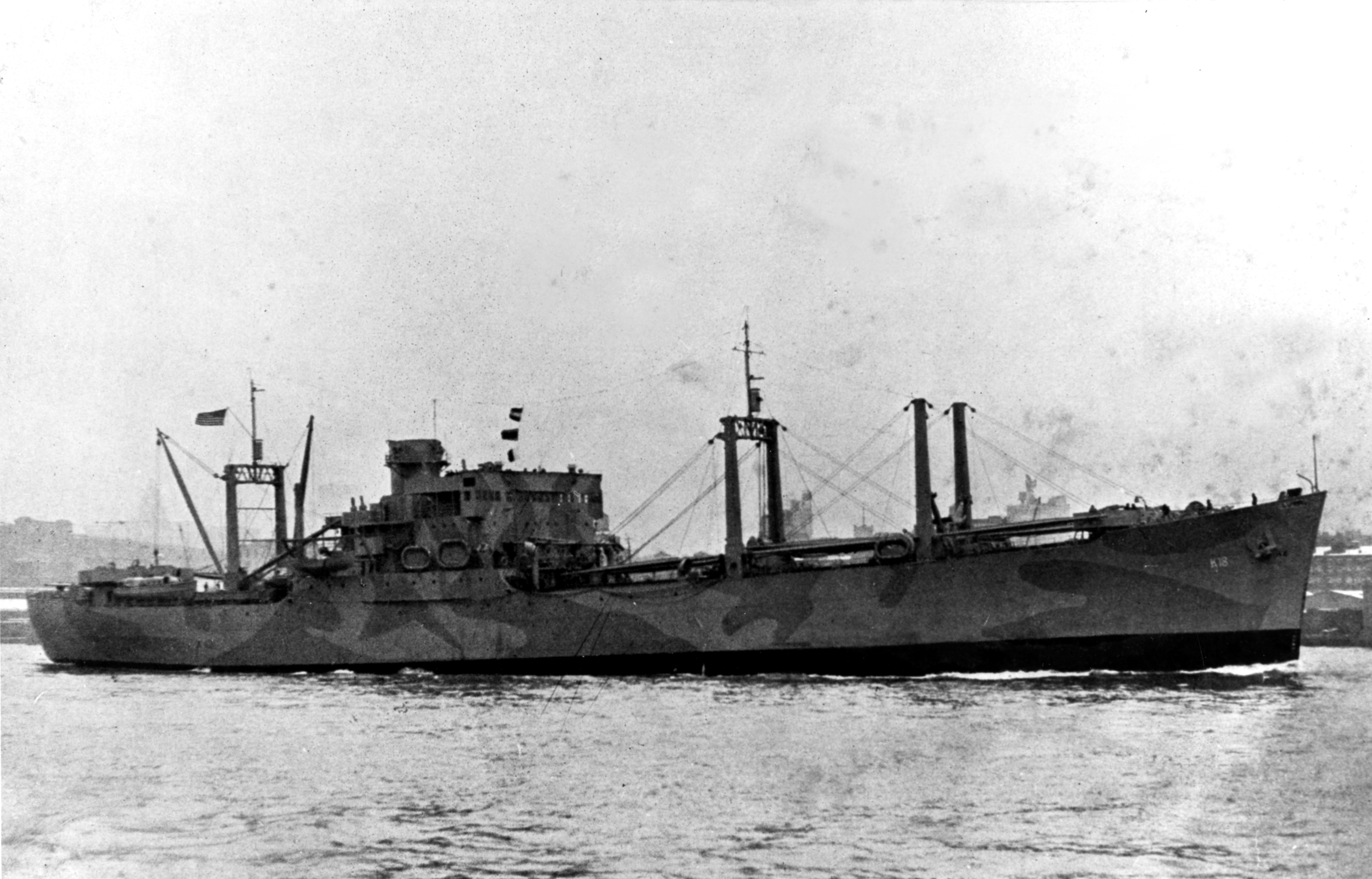
- USS Arcturus - a typical Arcturus-class AKA

Class overview
- Builders: Sun Shipbuilding, PA (5); Tampa Shipbuilding, FL (3); Federal Shipbuilding, NJ (3)
- Operators: United States Navy
- In commission: 1940-1955 (US Navy)
- Completed: 11

General characteristics
- Type: Type C2 ship
- Displacement: 14,225 tons
- Length: 459 ft 1 in (140 m)
- Beam: 63 ft (19 m)
- Draft: 26 ft 5 in (8 m)
- Speed: 16.5 kn (31 km/h)
- Complement: 267 (varies)
- Armament: 1 × 5-inch 38 caliber dual-purpose gun mount; 4 × twin 40 mm gun mounts

The Arcturus-class attack cargo ships were converted from other ship types by Sun Shipbuilding & Drydock Co. in Chester, Pennsylvania, Tampa Shipbuilding Co. in Tampa, Florida, and Federal Shipbuilding & Drydock Co. in Kearny, New Jersey, during World War II.

Like all attack cargo ships (AKAs), they were designed to carry combat loaded military cargo and landing craft, and to use the latter to land weapons, supplies, and troops on enemy shores during amphibious operations.

All these ships were built on the same standard hull design, but there were some differences from ship to ship:

The armament varied, as did that of the other ships of the day. During 1944–1945, the 5"/38-caliber gun was recognized as the best gun for the dual role of antiaircraft and naval gunfire support, and the 40 mm was seen as the best antiaircraft gun. The older 20 mm and .50 caliber guns had been recognized to be of limited value, and were being phased out, though they appeared on some of these ships. The 20 mm guns were later removed from all of them, but it is not clear just when this happened.

The complement varied as well, but the DANFS figures sometimes seem to confuse ship's company with embarked troops in determining a ship's complement.

== See also ==
- Andromeda-class attack cargo ship
- Artemis-class attack cargo ship
- Charleston-class amphibious cargo ship
- Tolland-class attack cargo ship
- List of United States Navy amphibious warfare ships
- Fomalhaut (AKA-5) — a Type C1 AKA that falls within the number range of the Arcturus class
- Alhena (AKA-9) — a Type C2 (C2-S) AKA that falls within the number range
- Almaack (AKA-10) — a Type C3 AKA that falls within the number range
