= USS Mockingbird (AMS-27) =

Minesweeper of the United States Navy

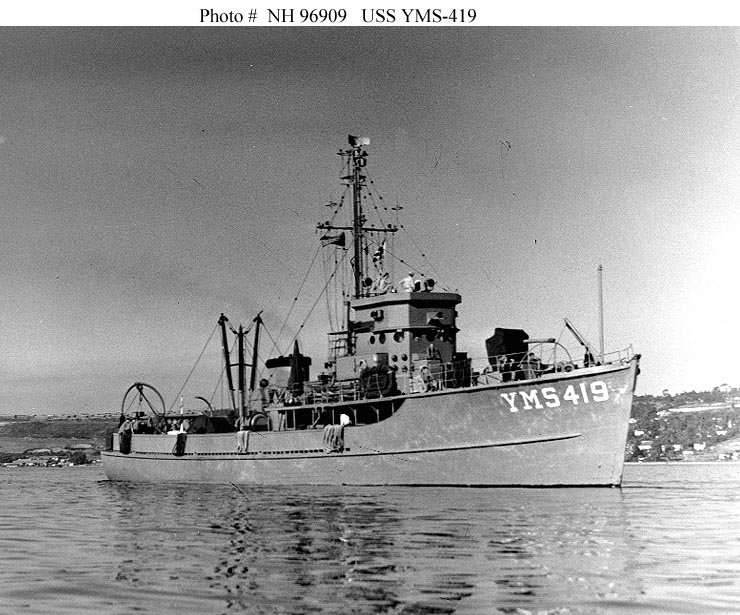

History

United States
- Namesake: "A small bird of the thrush family, which imitates the calls of other birds; found in the southern United States."
- Builder: Henry C. Grebe and Co.
- Laid down: 17 September 1943
- Launched: 23 March 1944
- Commissioned: USS YMS-419, 18 November 1944
- In service: as Mockingbird, 17 February 1947
- Out of service: 6 January 1956
- Reclassified: 17 February 1947
- Stricken: 15 November 1974
- Honours and awards: One battle star for post World War II operations; 10 battle stars for Korean war operations.
- Fate: transferred to South Korea, 6 January 1956

South Korea
- Name: ROKS Ko Chang (MSC-521)
- Acquired: 6 January 1956
- Out of service: 1977
- Fate: Unknown

General characteristics
- Displacement: 270 tons
- Length: 136 ft (41 m)
- Beam: 24 ft 6 in (7.47 m)
- Draft: 8 ft (2.4 m)
- Propulsion: two 880shp General Motors 8-268A diesel engines, two shafts
- Speed: 15 knots
- Complement: 32
- Armament: one single 3 in (76 mm) gun mount, two 20 mm, two dcp

USS Mockingbird (AMS-27/YMS-419) was a YMS-1-class minesweeper of the YMS-135 subclass built for the United States Navy during World War II. She was the second U.S. Navy ship to be named Mockingbird.

== History ==
AMS-27 was laid down as YMS-419 on 17 September 1943 by Henry C. Grebe & Co., Chicago, Illinois; launched 23 March 1944; and commissioned 18 November 1944.

Following her shakedown and training period, YMS-419 was assigned to duty in the western Pacific Ocean. She departed San Pedro, California, 27 August 1945 and 27 October began minesweeping operations off occupied Japan. Until the spring of 1946 she swept shipping channels in the Far East, first off Honshū, then between Kyūshū and Korea, and finally around the approaches to the Yangtze River. She then returned to the United States for an extended stay, during which she was redesignated AMS-27 and named Mockingbird 18 February 1947.

=== Korean War operations ===
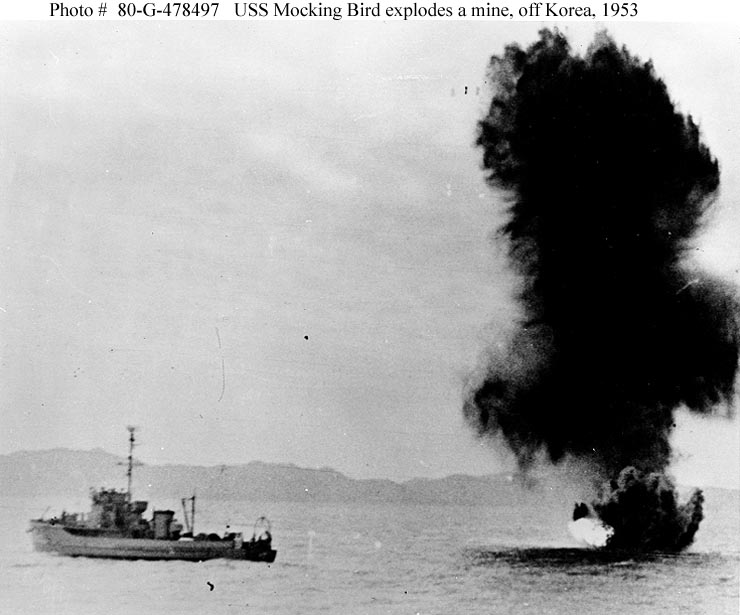
USS Mockingbird destroying an enemy mine

At the end of 1947, Mockingbird returned to the Far East, joining MinRon 7 in early January 1948. For the next year and a half she operated in Japanese waters, primarily in the Inland Sea area and in the Straits of Shimonoseki June 1950 brought open hostilities to the Far East again as troops from North Korea streamed over the border separating it from the Republic of Korea, formerly an American occupation zone. From 14 to 16 July Mockingbird conducted a check sweep of Hoko Ko, Korea, with her squadron, in preparation for an amphibious landing at Pohang by the 1st Cavalry Division 18 July. After that mission, the squadron made a similar sweep at Chinhai and then returned to Japan.

On 10 September Mockingbird was underway to pave the way for another landing, this time Inchon. As a unit of task force TF 90, she conducted a check sweep of Inchon harbor, and then took station in the outer screen of the antisubmarine patrol. At the end of the month, having been transferred to task force TF 95, she proceeded to Kunsan, where she swept her first mine of the Korean War, and then returned to Sasebo.

She departed on her next combat mission 7 October, arriving off Wonsan on the 10th. Remaining through the 31st, she swept 19 mines and, after the loss of Pirate (AM-275) and Pledge (AM-277) and the hazardous rescue of survivors (12 October), became the flagship of MinDiv 31. This honor allowed her to be the first to penetrate all minefields and channels. In November she sailed north and cleared channels into Hungnam and Songjin before returning to Yokosuka, her homeport, for repairs.

Her availability period cut short by the Hungnam evacuation, Mockingbird returned to Pusan in late December and the following month conducted a "cleanup" sweep of the Korean east coast from the 39th parallel to Pohang to provide easy access to the beaches for the fire support ships of TF 95. She then returned briefly to Japan before resuming operations in the Wonsan area in preparation for a landing by Republic of Korea Marines. She next retired to Pusan where she Joined MinDiv 33 and swept in various ports on the south coast of Korean through March.

For the remainder of the war, Mockingbird alternated between the east and west coasts of Korea, sweeping chant nets and conducting anti-junk patrols from Chinnampo and Haeju, south to Mokpo and around the peninsula to Wonsan, Hungnam, and Songjin. Following the signing of the Truce Agreement, 27 July 1953, Mockingbird became a unit of the escort and blockading forces which remained on patrol off Korea.

In January 1955 she returned to Japan and for the next year conducted operations primarily in the Inland Sea. During that time she was again redesignated, to MSC(O)-27, 7 February 1955.

On 6 January 1956 she decommissioned and was transferred to South Korea under the Mutual Defense Assistance Program, where she served until being discarded in 1977.

== Awards and honors ==
As YMS-419, the mine sweeper received one battle star for post-World War II sweeping operations in the Pacific; as Mockingbird she received 10 battle stars for Korean service.
