= P113 =

P113 may refer to:

- ARM Ignacio L. Vallarta (P113), a patrol boat of the Mexican Navy
- Papyrus 113, a biblical manuscript
- STAT2, signal transducer and activator of transcription 2
- TCG Yarhisar (P-113), a patrol boat of the Turkish Navy
- P113, a state regional road in Latvia
