= USS Velocity (AM-128) =

Minesweeper of the United States Navy

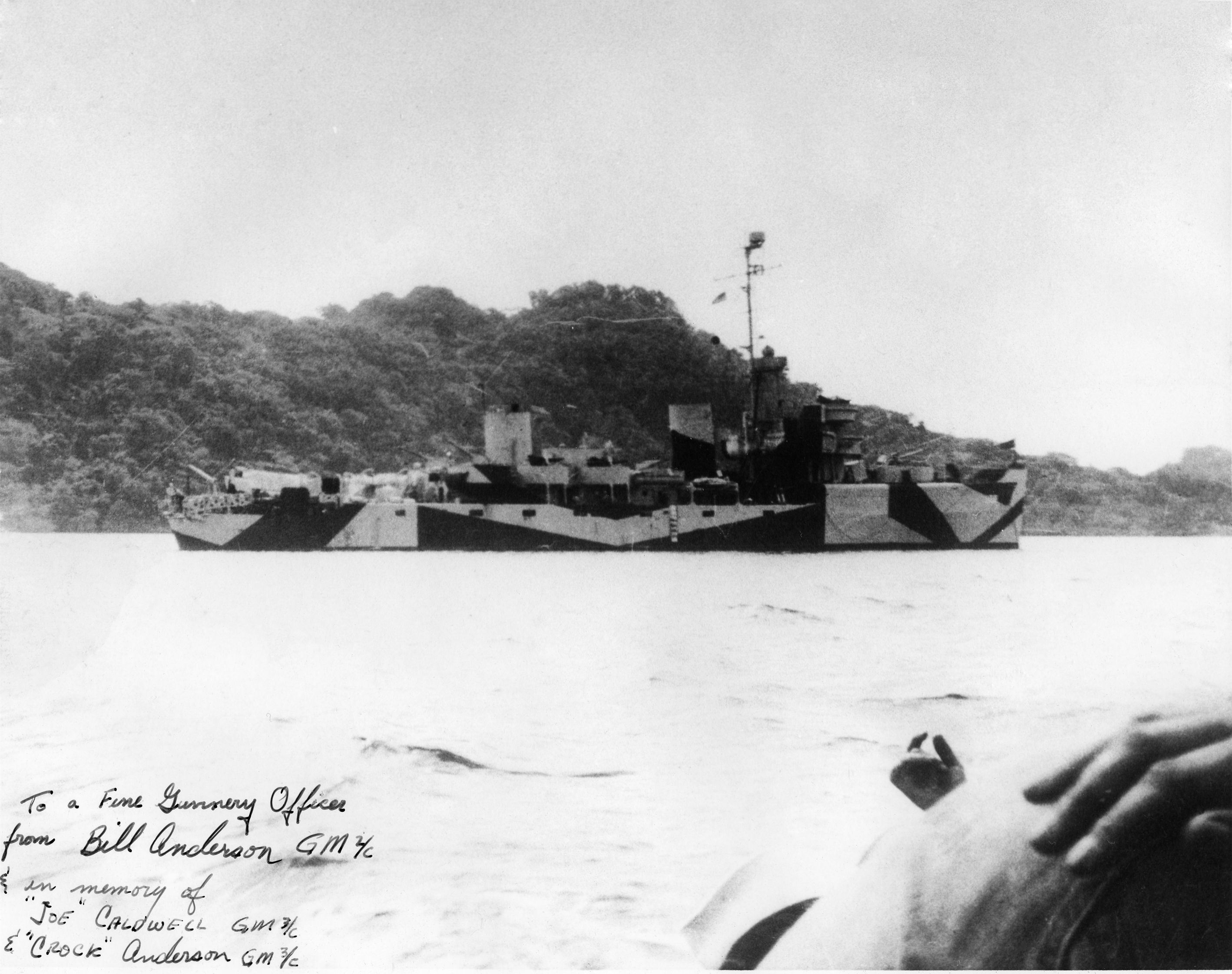
- USS Velocity in 1942

History

United States
- Name: USS Velocity (AM-128)
- Builder: Gulf Shipbuilding Corporation, Chickasaw, Alabama
- Laid down: 21 July 1941
- Launched: 15 April 1942
- Commissioned: 4 April 1943
- Decommissioned: 7 October 1946
- Reclassified: MSF-128, 7 February 1955
- Stricken: 1 July 1972
- Honours and awards: 5 battle stars (World War II)
- Fate: Sold to Mexico, 1 July 1972

Mexico
- Name: ARM Ignacio L. Vallarta (C82)
- Namesake: Ignacio L. Vallarta
- Acquired: 1 July 1972
- Reclassified: G14; P113, 1993
- Status: in active service, as of 2007

General characteristics
- Class & type: Auk-class minesweeper
- Displacement: 890 long tons (904 t)
- Length: 221 ft 3 in (67.44 m)
- Beam: 32 ft (9.8 m)
- Draft: 10 ft 9 in (3.28 m)
- Speed: 18 knots (33 km/h; 21 mph)
- Complement: 100 officers and enlisted
- Armament: 1 × 3"/50 caliber gun; 2 × 40 mm guns; 2 × 20 mm guns; 2 × Depth charge tracks

USS Velocity (AM-128) was an Auk-class minesweeper acquired by the United States Navy for the dangerous task of removing mines from minefields laid in the water to prevent ships from passing. She was the second warship to bear the name.

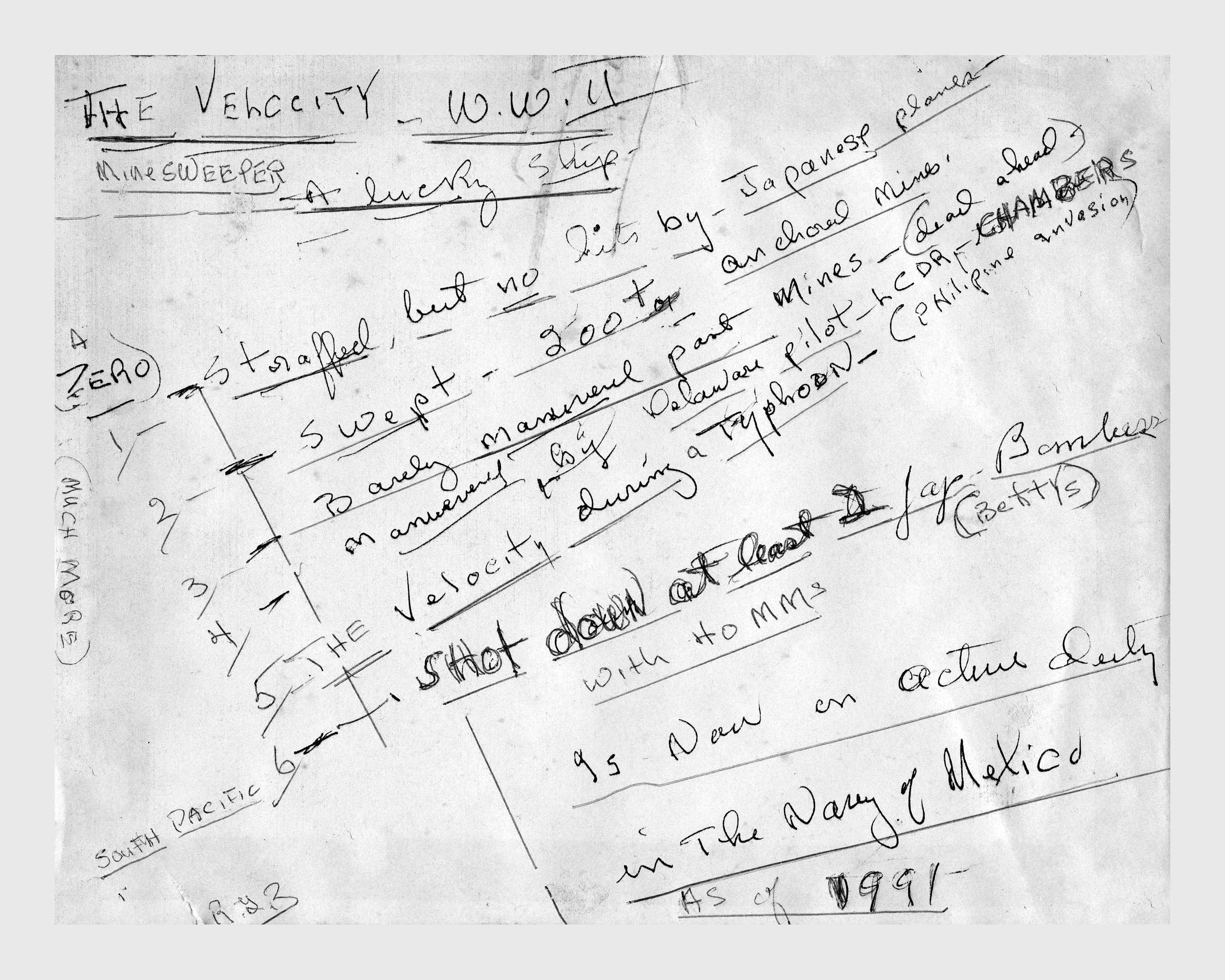
Notes on USS Velocity by LCdr Roland Blandford

Velocity was laid down on 21 July 1941 at Chickasaw, Alabama, by the Gulf Shipbuilding Co.; launched on 15 April 1942; sponsored by Mrs. K. B. Hover, the wife of the shipbuilder's destroyer hull foreman; and commissioned on 4 April 1943.

== Initial operations ==
After fitting out and conducting sea trials, Velocity took on further supplies, underwent yard work at New Orleans, Louisiana, conducted minesweeping training out of Burrwood, Louisiana, and practiced anti-submarine tactics out of Key West, Florida. Departing the Florida Keys on 3 May, the minecraft arrived at Norfolk, Virginia, on the 6th and escorted a coastal convoy to Charleston, South Carolina, before undergoing further yard work at the Norfolk, Virginia, Navy Yard.

Departing Norfolk, Virginia, on 6 June, Velocity arrived at Key West, Florida, three days later, en route to the Panama Canal Zone. She then escorted eight LST's across the Gulf of Mexico to Balboa, before she transited the canal on 18 June. She departed the Panama Canal Zone on the 24th, but her onward routing was cancelled; and she put back into port soon thereafter. She conducted local operations out of Balboa into July, after which time she transported a cargo of diesel fuel oil to Baltra Island, in the Galapagos group, to alleviate a critical fuel shortage there. When she returned to Balboa, she conducted further local operations, including towing targets for the aircraft from a carrier task group training in the vicinity — including Princeton (CVL-23), Lexington (CV-16), and Belleau Wood (CVL-24).

Velocity subsequently escorted floating drydocks ABD-1 and ABD-2 and their tows, SS Sombrero Key and SS Stratford Point, to the New Hebrides Islands, arriving at Espiritu Santo on 24 September. The minesweeper soon shifted to Noumea, New Caledonia. She operated put of this port on convoy escort and local patrol duties into mid-1944, escorting ships to the New Hebrides, the Solomons, the Ellice Islands, and the Bismarck Archipelago.

== Pacific Operations with the Third Fleet ==
In mid-August, Velocity joined the U.S. 3rd Fleet. On 8 September, she departed Guadalcanal in company with Task Group (TG) 32.17, in the screen, escorting a convoy bound for the invasion of the western Carolines. Soon thereafter, Velocity, in company with Triumph (AM-323) and Competent (AM-316), arrived off Kossol Roads early on 15 September. Together, the three ships swept 13 mines. The next day, Wadleigh (DD-689) struck a mine which very nearly broke the ship's back and sank her. However, prompt damage control saved the destroyer, and Velocity was among the ships which sent a fire and rescue party to lend assistance to the stricken Wadleigh.

Upon completion of the operation at Kossol Roads, Velocity shifted to Ulithi, arriving on the last day of September. Here, the minesweeper conducted sweeping operations in the harbor before serving as a convoy escort, screening ships to Humboldt Bay, New Guinea. Soon thereafter, she then shifted to Seeadler Harbor, at Manus in the Admiralties.

== Leyte Gulf operations ==
Velocity departed Manus on 10 October with the remainder of her division, Mine Division (MinDiv) 14. Arriving off Leyte Gulf on the 17th, the minecraft and her sisters commenced sweeping the area in the path of the invasion slated to begin on the 20th. On the 19th, a Japanese "Val" dive bomber dropped a bomb near the ship and attempted to strafe her, but was driven off by brisk anti-aircraft fire. That evening, Velocity and MinDiv 14 swept ahead of the battleships of Rear Admiral Jesse B. Oldendorf — the same ships which a few nights hence would win the Battle of Surigao Strait. Velocity operated as mine-disposal vessel for the division and ended up with a tally of 24 mines sunk and 15 destroyed.

== Velocity shoots down attacking aircraft ==
She conducted sweeping operations on the day of the landings, 20 October, at Leyte and continued this duty until the 23rd, at which time she and her sister sweepers were ordered to join the antiaircraft screen for the transports. On the 26th, when a formation of twin-engined "Betty" bombers attacked the anchorage area, Velocity splashed one of the attackers. During the confused melee, an American Grumman F6F Hellcat fighter went down due to a fuel shortage. Velocity quickly sent her motor whaleboat to pick up the aviator, but a boat from Token (AM-126) arrived on the scene first. On the 27th, however, Velocity took her turn at bat and rescued a pilot from a crashed American aircraft.

== Stateside overhaul ==
Following the Leyte operation, Velocity departed the Philippines on 28 October and proceeded via Manus to Portland, Oregon, where she arrived on 4 December. After a major availability at the Albina Engine and Machine Works Dock there, the minesweeper departed Portland on 3 March, bound for San Pedro, California. Subsequently, shifting to San Francisco, California, Velocity departed the U.S. West Coast on 4 April and arrived at Pearl Harbor on the 14th.

== Return to the Far East ==
Departing Hawaiian waters two days later, Velocity escorted the ammunition ship Sangay (AE-10) to Guam, via Eniwetok, in the Marshalls. She then moved to Saipan, where she joined the U.S. 5th Fleet. Shifting to Kerama Retto, Okinawa, on 11 May, the minesweeper operated in the Ryūkyūs as minesweeper, anti-aircraft vessel, and anti-submarine ship. When Halloran (DE-305) was hit by a Japanese kamikaze on the night of 21 June, Velocity went to her aid.

On 4 July, Velocity departed Kerama Retto for minesweeping operations in the East China Sea. With her base of operations now at Buckner Bay, Okinawa, the ship proceeded to sweep 13 mines between 4 and 30 July and continued operations into the East China Sea into August and past the end of the war with Japan.

== Post-World War II operations ==
In the operation concluded on 25 August, Velocity tallied a score of 35 mines located and destroyed. The minesweeper operated in Japanese waters into October 1945, between Honshū and Hokkaidō, to clear shipping lanes for the ships of the occupation forces. During this time, she was based at Ominato, Japan.

After a brief period at Shanghai, China, at the end of December 1945, Velocity shifted to Japanese waters. Departing Sasebo, Japan, on 21 January 1946, Velocity arrived at San Francisco, California, on 1 March, via Saipan, Eniwetok, and Pearl Harbor.

== Decommissioning ==
Decommissioned and placed in inactive status on 7 October 1946, the minesweeper remained in reserve through the 1960s. During this time, her classification was changed to fleet minesweeper, and she was designated MSF-128 on 7 February 1955. Struck from the Navy list on 1 July 1972, Velocity was simultaneously sold to the government of Mexico. She was renamed ARM Ignacio L. Vallarta (C82). Her pennant number was later changed to G14, and changed a final time to P113 in 1993. As of 2018, Ignacio L. Vallarta was in active service for the Mexican Navy.

== Awards ==
Velocity received five battle stars for her World War II service.
