= Chickasaw Shipyard Village Historic District =

Historic district in Alabama, United States

- U.S. National Register of Historic Places
- U.S. Historic district
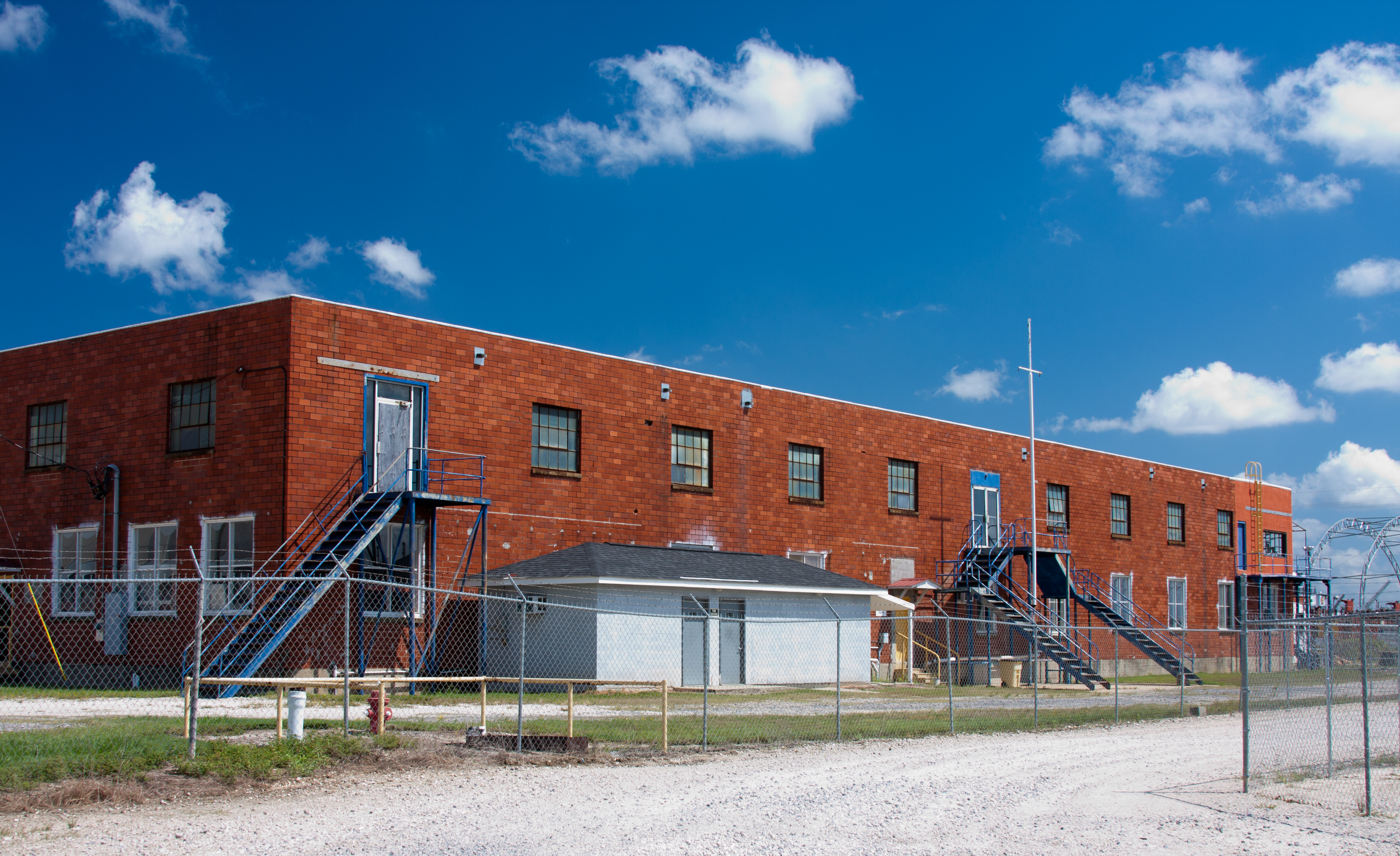

- Location within Alabama Location within the United States
- Location: Bounded by Jefferson St., Jackson St., Yeend Ave., and Chickasaw Creek, Chickasaw, Alabama
- Coordinates: 30°45′49″N 88°04′28″W
- Area: 1,200 acres (490 ha)
- Built: 1917-1946
- Architect: various
- Architectural style: various
- NRHP reference No.: 04000924
- Added to NRHP: September 3, 2004

Chickasaw Shipyard Village Historic District is a historic district comprising buildings and areas within Chickasaw, Alabama, which is a northern suburb of Mobile in Mobile County. The site is historically significant due to its role as a company town for the Gulf Shipbuilding Corporation shipyard during the first half of the twentieth century.

In addition, Chickasaw was the subject of a United States Supreme Court case, Marsh v. Alabama (1946) upholding the First Amendment rights of individuals living in privately owned towns, because the towns were operated as public places. The district was added to the National Register of Historic Places on September 3, 2004.

== History ==
=== Chickasaw Shipyard Village ===
The company town of Chickasaw was built and owned in the early 20th century by Chickasaw Shipbuilding. In addition to well-built and attractive houses, the town included amenities such as a multipurpose community center, school, health clinic, and stores) and utility services (a water purification plant, and sewage treatment plant). One exceptionally well-built building originally served as an ice house. Later it was adapted for use as offices and a hospital. Some of the streets in the town were sidewalks, necessitating use of alleys for vehicular traffic. Tennis courts and a golf course were also available in the town. When Chickasaw Shipbuilding closed its shipyard, many houses were moved or demolished.

Upon the purchase of the shipyard and town by Gulf Shipbuilding in 1940, the existing homes were repaired and modified. Additional city improvements (such as street paving) were made. The business block was a popular shopping area, consisting of numerous buildings connected by a covered concrete sidewalk which ran the length of the block (approximately 250 feet or 75 meters). The establishments included a drugstore, a grocery store, a restaurant, and post office. By 1943, Gulf Shipbuilding had leased the remaining space to other businesses.

Many of the original homes still remain in Chickasaw and form the heart of a historic district. Primarily through the efforts of Gene Ford, an architectural historian from the University of Alabama, this area was documented and data was collected about its buildings and history. It was added to the National Register of Historic Places in 2004. The Chickasaw Historic Preservation Society has created a driving tour featuring the highlights of the area.

=== Incorporation of Chickasaw ===
Early in 1946, Leedy Investment Company purchased the entire company town for one million dollars. Current occupants were given the option to purchase the homes they had been renting. Many prior residents also purchased homes and moved back to the town. The city of Chickasaw was incorporated on November 12, 1946.

In 1979, Halter Marine reactivated the shipbuilding facility to provide service vessels and tugboats to the booming offshore oil industry. The resurgence was short-lived and the facility was closed again in 1983. The former shipyard now serves as a small general cargo facility.
