= USS Pledge (AM-277) =

Minesweeper of the United States Navy

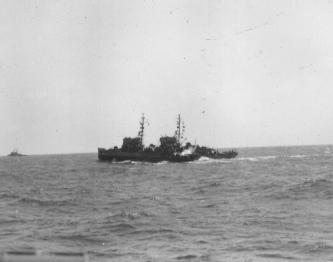

History

United States
- Name: USS Pledge
- Builder: Gulf Shipbuilding Co.
- Laid down: 1 July 1943
- Launched: 23 December 1943
- Commissioned: 29 July 1944
- Decommissioned: 6 November 1946
- Recommissioned: 28 November 1947
- Decommissioned: 16 April 1948
- Recommissioned: 10 January 1950
- Fate: Mined off Wonsan, North Korea, 10 October 1950

General characteristics
- Class & type: Admirable-class minesweeper
- Displacement: 625 tons
- Length: 184 ft 6 in (56.24 m)
- Beam: 33 ft (10 m)
- Draft: 9 ft 9 in (2.97 m)
- Propulsion: 2 × ALCO 539 diesel engines, 1,710 shp (1.3 MW); Farrel-Birmingham single reduction gear; 2 shafts
- Speed: 15 knots (27.8 km/h)
- Complement: 104
- Armament: 1 × 3"/50 caliber gun DP; 2 × twin Bofors 40 mm guns; 6 × 20 mm guns; 1 × Hedgehog anti-submarine mortar; 4 × Depth charge projectors; 2 × Depth charge tracks

Service record
- Part of: US Atlantic Fleet (1944-1945); US Pacific Fleet (1945-1950)
- Victories: World War II; Pacific Theater; Korean War
- Awards: Presidential Unit Citation (Korean War); 1 Battle star (World War II)

USS Pledge (AM-277) was an Admirable-class minesweeper built for the U.S. Navy during World War II. She was built to clear minefields in offshore waters, and served the Navy in the Atlantic Ocean and then was transferred to the North Pacific Ocean. She survived the world war and was awarded one battle star, but, during the Korean War, she struck a mine and was sunk. She received the Presidential Unit Citation for her Korean service.

== History ==
Pledge, a steel-hulled minesweeper, was laid down 1 July 1943 by the Gulf Shipbuilding Corp., Chickasaw, Alabama; launched 23 December 1943; sponsored by Mrs. C. A. Bender; and commissioned 29 July 1944.

After shakedown, Pledge reported to the Atlantic Fleet 30 September 1944. Following patrol off the coast of Maine until 7 November, she trained off Norfolk, Virginia, 9 to 29 November and at Miami, Florida, 2 December 1944 to 10 March 1945.

To prepare for Pacific duty, Pledge underwent overhaul at Philadelphia, Pennsylvania, 13 March to 1 April.

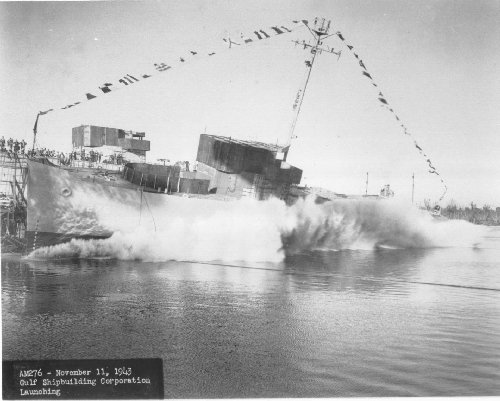
USS Pivot (AM-276) launched at the Gulf Shipbuilding Company, Chickasaw, Alabama, on 11 November 1943. In the background can be seen the USS Pledge (AM-277).

She then sailed via the Panama Canal and San Diego, California, to Pearl Harbor where she arrived 7 May. Following local exercises, she departed Hawaiian waters 20 May 1945, and steamed via Eniwetok, Guam, and Saipan to Kerama Retto, Ryukyu Islands, where she arrived 24 June. She anchored at Buckner Bay, Okinawa, 7 July and at Guam 12 August. Pledge remained at Guam conducting exercises until departure 11 January 1946.

Following arrival at Pearl Harbor 25 January she accompanied a convoy to San Pedro, Los Angeles, 4 to 15 February. To prepare for inactivation, she returned to Pearl Harbor 31 July, and arrived at Bremerton, Washington, 30 September. She decommissioned 6 November 1946.

Pledge re-entered service 28 November 1947. Upon completion of training she steamed via Pearl Harbor to Yokosuka, Japan, where she arrived 28 March 1948. She entered reserve status 16 April. Granted a reduced commission 10 January 1950, she trained, and, upon the outbreak of war in Korea, she accompanied a convoy of merchantmen to Pusan, Korea, 11 July 1950. She continued minesweeping duties off Pusan until she reported for duty as a harbor control vessel at Sasebo, Japan, 7 August. She departed Sasebo 12 September, and, on the 15th, she swept the area to be used for the invasion of Inchon, Korea. On patrol off Inchon 30 September she captured 44 prisoners from a large sampan.

Pledge commenced minesweeping operations off Wonsan Harbor 10 October. She accompanied minesweeper USS Pirate (AM-275) to deployment off Wonsan, Korea. Pirate struck a mine. Enemy shore batteries on Sin-do directed heavy fire upon Pirate, which sank shortly thereafter, and then upon Pledge. As Pledge attempted to maneuver, she too struck a mine and was severely damaged. After fruitless attempts to save her Pledge sank. Her survivors were picked up by USS Endicott (DMS-35).

== Awards and honors ==
Pledge received one battle star for World War II service and a Presidential Unit Citation for service in Korea.
