= Tucker v. Texas =

- Supreme Court of the United States

Argued December 6, 1945 Decided January 7, 1946
- Full case name: Tucker v. State of Texas
- Citations: 326 U.S. 517 (more) 66 S. Ct. 274; 90 L. Ed. 274; 1946 U.S. LEXIS 2927

Case history
- Prior: State of Texas v. Tucker, Justice Court of Medina County, Texas (not reported); Tucker v. State of Texas, County Court of Medina County, Texas (not reported)

Holding
- Held that a statute used to punish an individual for refusing to refrain from religious activity is an improper restriction on freedom of the press and religion.

Court membership
- Chief Justice Harlan F. Stone Associate Justices Hugo Black · Stanley F. Reed; Felix Frankfurter · William O. Douglas; Frank Murphy · Robert H. Jackson; Wiley B. Rutledge · Harold H. Burton

Case opinions
- Majority: Black, joined by Douglas, Frankfurter, Murphy, Rutledge
- Concurrence: Frankfurter
- Dissent: Stone, Reed, Burton
- Jackson took no part in the consideration or decision of the case.

Laws applied
- U.S. Const. amend. I; U.S. Const. amend. XIV, §1; Tex. Pen. Code, Chap. 3, Art. 479 (1945)

Tucker v. Texas, 326 U.S. 517 (1946), was a case in which the Supreme Court of the United States held that a state statute making it an offense to distribute literature in a federal government-owned town was an improper restriction on freedom of the press and religion.

== Background ==
=== History ===
Tucker was an ordained minister of the group known as Jehovah's Witnesses. In accordance with the practices of this group he called on people from door to door, presenting his religious views to those willing to listen, and distributes religious literature to those willing to receive it. In the course of his work, he went to the Hondo Navigation Village located on the Hondo Army Airfield in Medina County, Texas. The village was owned by the United States under a Congressional program which was designed to provide housing for persons engaged in National Defense activities. According to all indications the village was freely accessible and open to the public and had the characteristics of a typical American town.

The Federal Public Housing Authority had placed the buildings in charge of a manager whose duty it was to rent the houses, collect the rents, and generally to supervise operations, subject to over-all control by the Authority. He ordered Tucker to discontinue all religious activities in the village. Tucker refused. Later the manager ordered Tucker to leave the village. Insisting that the manager had no right to suppress religious activities, appellant declined to leave, and his arrest followed. At the trial the manager testified that the controlling Federal agency had given him full authority to regulate the conduct of those living in the village, and that he did not allow preaching by ministers of any denomination without a permit issued by him in his discretion. He thought this broad authority was entrusted to him, at least in part, by a regulation, which the Authority's Washington office had allegedly promulgated. He testified that this regulation provided that no peddlers or hawkers could come into or remain in the village without getting permission from the manager.

=== Lower courts ===
Tucker was charged in the Justice Court of Medina County with violating Article 479, Chap. 3 of the Texas Penal Code which makes it an offense for any 'peddler or hawker of goods or merchandise' willfully to refuse to leave premises after having been notified to do so by the owner or possessor thereof. Tucker argued that he was not peddler or hawker of merchandise, but a minister of the gospel engaged in the distribution of religious literature to willing recipients. He contended that to construe the Texas statute as applicable to his activities would, to that extent, bring it into conflict with the Constitutional guarantees of freedom of press and religion. His contention was rejected and he was convicted. On appeal to the Medina County Court, his Constitutional argument was again overruled.

=== Direct appeal to U.S. Supreme Court ===
At the time, Texas law did not provide for a subsequent appeal to a higher state court. Under 28 U.S.C. 344(a) (now at 28 U.S.C. § 1257), the United States Supreme Court has jurisdiction to hear an appeal when there is no higher state court authorized to review the case. The Supreme Court granted certiorari to hear the case.

== Opinion of the Court ==
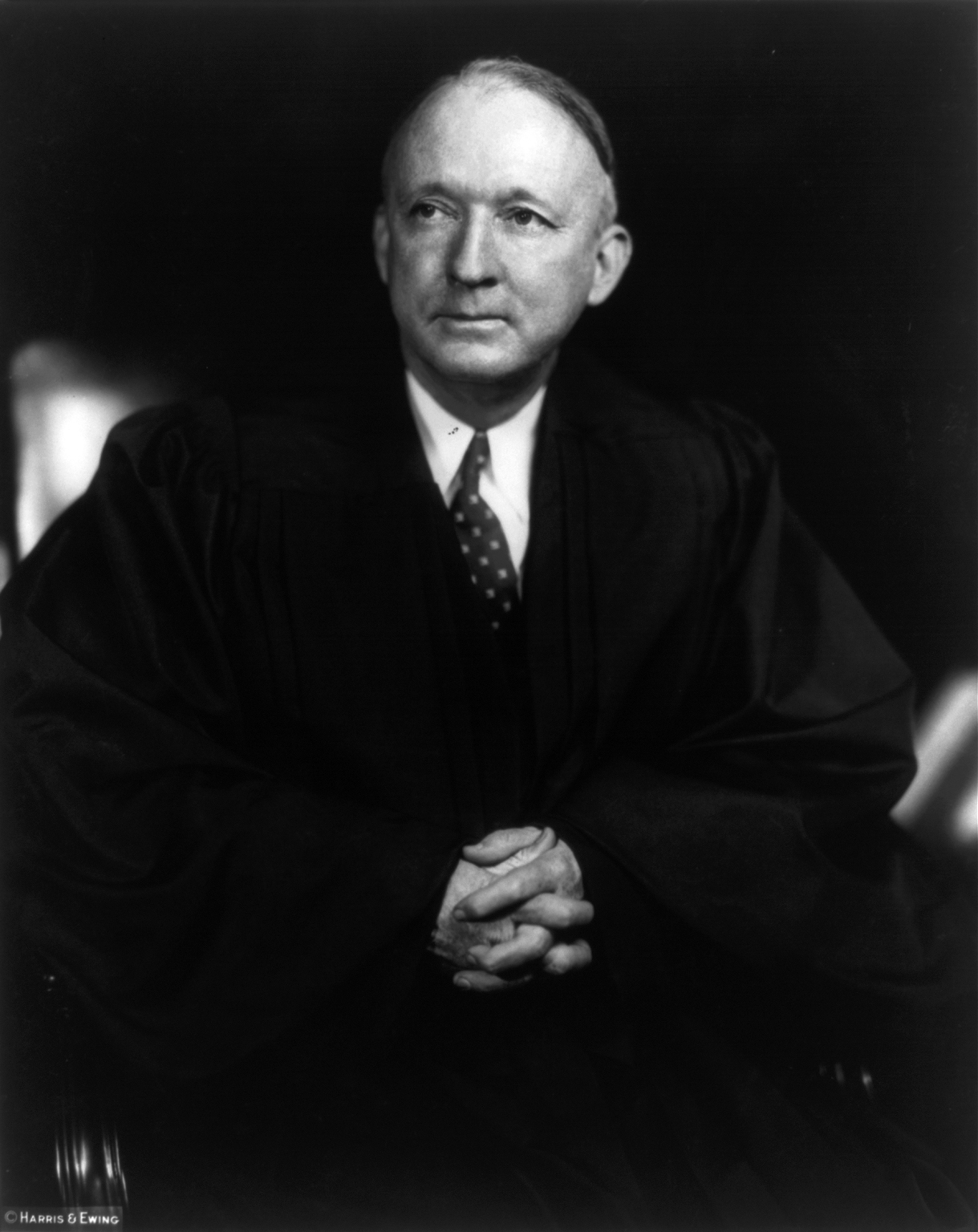
Justice Hugo Black, author of majority opinion

Justice Hugo Black delivered the opinion of the court. Black referred to Marsh v. Alabama, 326 U.S. 501 (1946) which was decided during the same term. In that case, the court had held that a state trespassing statute could not be used to prevent the distribution of religious literature by requiring a permit in a company town. Black noted that the only difference here was that the Marsh case involved a privately owned town and the current case involved a town owned by the federal government. Black allowed that there might be a case where it might be proper for security reasons to prohibit outsiders from entering such a housing area, but that did not apply in this case. The case was reversed and remanded.

=== Concurrence ===
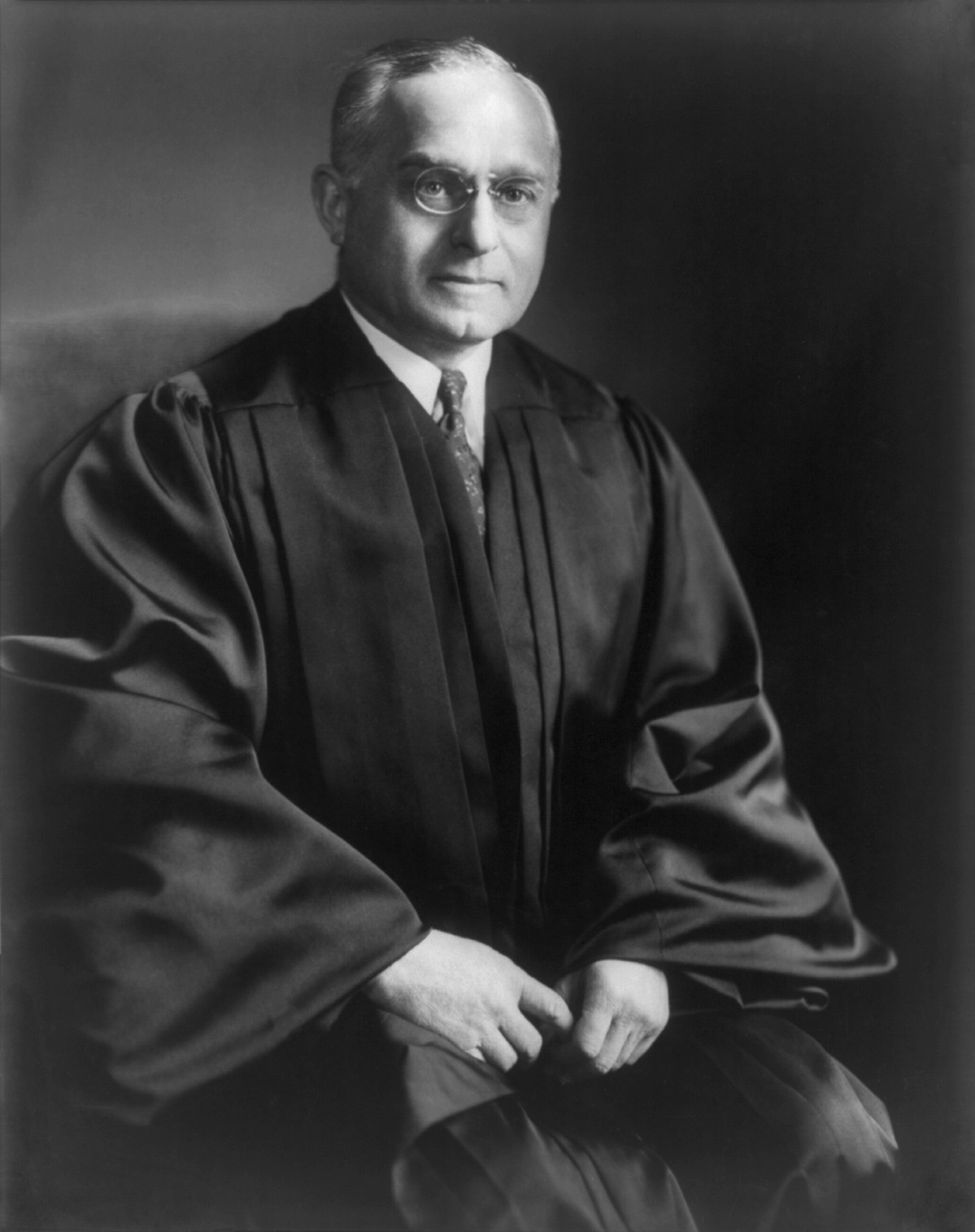
Justice Felix Frankfurter, author of concurring opinion

Justice Felix Frankfurter issued a concurring opinion. Frankfurter noted that since the town was owned by the government rather than a private company, the government was held a higher requirement not to infringe on basic freedoms than a company. He also noted that this did not involve an act of Congress.

=== Dissent ===
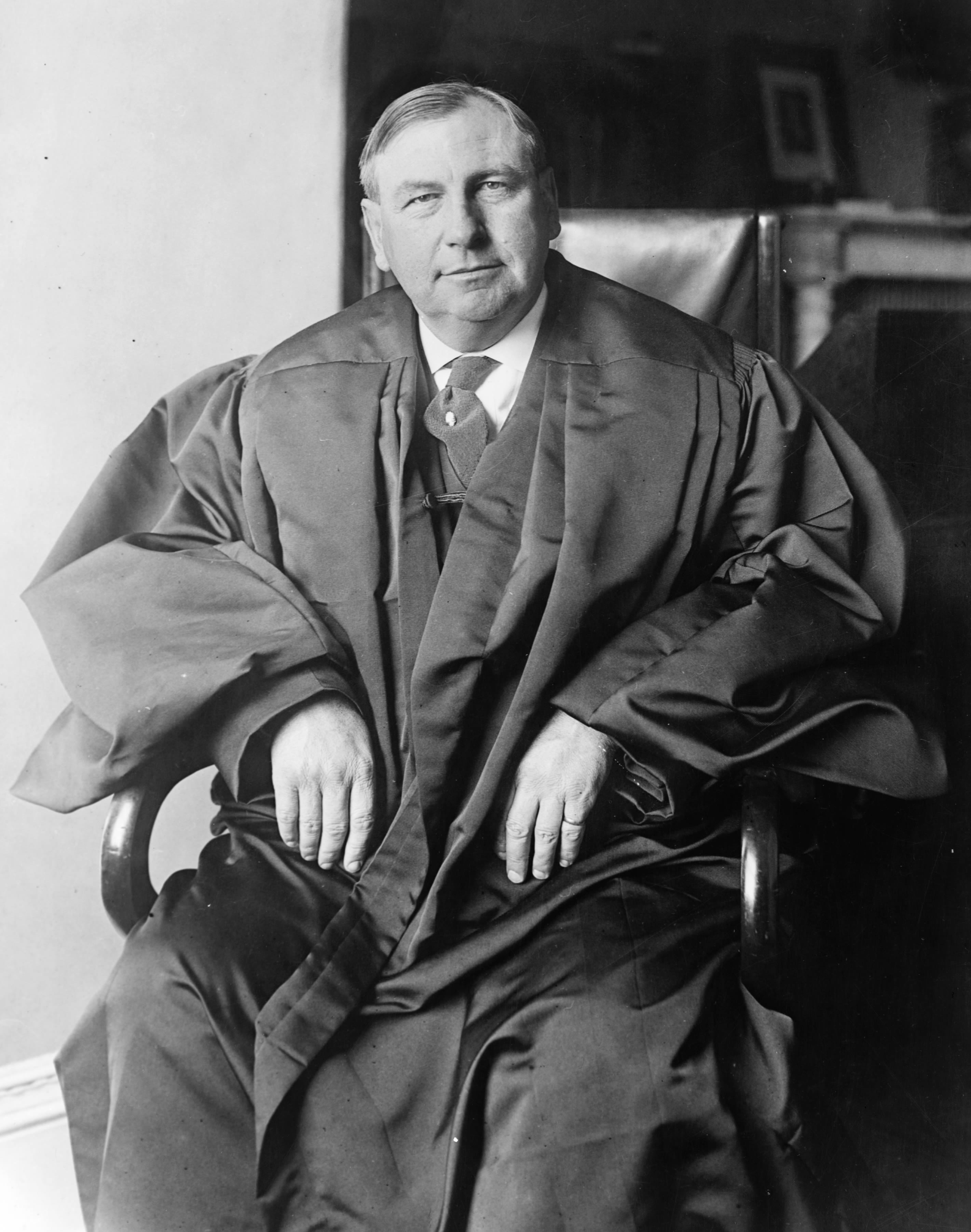
Justice Harlan Stone, author of dissenting opinion

Chief Justice Harlan F. Stone, Justice Stanley F. Reed and Justice Harold H. Burton construed this case as showing a conviction for refusing, at the request of its authorized agent, to leave premises which are owned by the United States and which have not been shown to be dedicated to general use by the public. They, therefore, would have upheld the conviction for the reasons given in the dissent in Marsh.

== Subsequent developments ==
This case was one of a series of cases known as the Jehovah's Witnesses cases that clarified the Free Exercise Clause. Those cases were heard primarily from the late 1930s to the mid-1940s. These cases also had a major role in enforcing the Bill of Rights against the states via the Due Process Clause of the Fourteenth Amendment. Like Tucker, most of these cases dealt with the distribution of religious literature and door-to-door preaching. Prior to these cases, the court had applied the clear and present danger test developed by Justice Oliver Wendell Holmes Jr. to constitutional issues, but beginning with these cases, they begin to apply the strict scrutiny test.

== See also ==
- Marsh v. Alabama
- United States Supreme Court cases involving Jehovah's Witnesses
- List of United States Supreme Court cases, volume 326
