= USS Pirate (AM-275) =

Minesweeper of the United States Navy

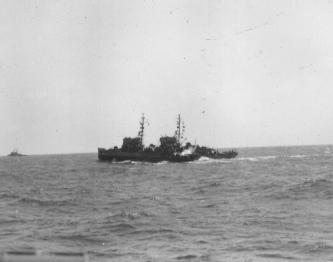
- USS Pirate & another Admirable-class minesweeper

History

United States
- Name: USS Pirate
- Builder: Gulf Shipbuilding Company
- Laid down: 1 July 1943
- Launched: 16 December 1943
- Commissioned: 16 June 1944
- Decommissioned: 6 November 1946
- Recommissioned: 14 August 1950
- Fate: Sunk by mine, 12 October 1950 off Wonsan, Korea (now in North Korea)

General characteristics
- Class & type: Admirable-class minesweeper
- Displacement: 625 tons
- Length: 184 ft 6 in (56.24 m)
- Beam: 33 ft (10 m)
- Draft: 9 ft 9 in (2.97 m)
- Propulsion: 2 × ALCO 539 diesel engines, 1,710 shp (1.3 MW); Farrel-Birmingham single reduction gear; 2 shafts
- Speed: 14.8 kn (27.4 km/h)
- Complement: 104
- Armament: 1 × 3"/50 caliber gun; 2 × twin Bofors 40 mm guns; 6 × Oerlikon 20 mm cannons; 1 × Hedgehog anti-submarine mortar; 4 × Depth charge projectors (K-guns); 2 × Depth charge tracks

Service record
- Part of: US Atlantic Fleet (1944-1945); US Pacific Fleet (1945-1950)
- Victories: World War II; Pacific Theater; Korean War
- Awards: 4 Battle stars

USS Pirate (AM-275) was an Admirable-class minesweeper built for the U.S. Navy during World War II. She was built to clear minefields in offshore waters, and served the Navy in the North Atlantic Ocean and then in the Pacific Ocean. She was returned to active service for the Korean War. During Operation Wonsan she struck a mine and sunk. For her dangerous work, she was awarded four battle stars for her Korean War effort.

== History ==
The second U.S. Navy warship named USS Pirate, she was laid down 1 July 1943 by Gulf Shipbuilding Co., Chickasaw, Alabama, launched 16 December 1943; sponsored by Mrs. Clara L. Oliver and commissioned 16 June 1944.

That summer, Pirate operated in and around Casco Bay and Boston, Massachusetts; conducted ASW exercises with Italian submarine Vortice and with Task Group TG 23.9 in early-August, and later that month swept the channel from Boston to Provincetown, Massachusetts. In December she transferred to Miami, Florida, where she was school ship for student officers for the next four months.

Pirate got underway from Miami 4 April 1945 to transit the Panama Canal, stopping at San Diego, California, and proceeding on to Pearl Harbor for duty. She departed Pearl Harbor and proceeded with MinDiv 32 via Eniwetok to Apra Harbor, Guam 7 June. As Allied forces made the final drive on Okinawa, Pirate reported at Nakagusuku Bay 26 June. In September she was minesweeping in area "Arcadia", in and around Jinsen, Korea, and operated off the northern coast of Formosa in November.

Decommissioned at Bremerton, Washington on 6 November 1946, the ship reported to ServPac in December 1947 for deployment in Japanese waters. In a caretaker status, she retained this status, out of service in reserve for the next several years

In July 1950, Pirate was with MinDiv 32, ServPac when hostilities in Korea called her back into active service. Recommissioned 14 August 1950 at Yokosuka, Japan, she departed Sasebo 8 September for duties off Pusan, Korea.

On 12 October she and USS Pledge (AM-277) were mine sweeping three miles off the enemy-held island of Sin-Do when the ships hit mines. Sinking within five minutes, Pirate had 12 sailors missing and one dead.

== Aftermath ==
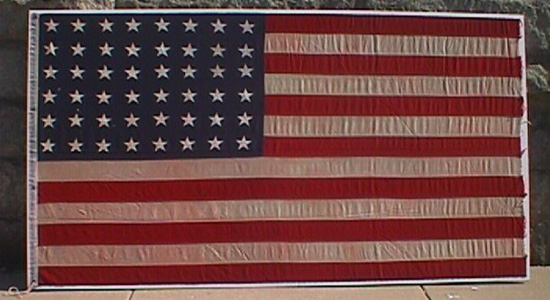
USS Pirate's battle flag at Washington Naval Yard

Attempts were made to salvage Pirate but failed so explosives were placed in her wreck and detonated to prevent North Korean forces from recovering any classified material. Additional aircraft and boats from other nearby warships arrived at the area after the action to help in the rescue operations.

USS Pirate, Pledge and Redhead each received the Presidential Unit Citation and their commanders were awarded the Silver Star for bravery. USS Partridge was mined off Wonsan on February 2 and became the last American vessel to be destroyed during operations in that area. Sometime in 1952, Lieutenant McMullen received an anonymous package containing Pirate's battle flag and on May 28, 1985, it was donated to the Naval Historical Center and is on display at the Korean War exhibit.

== Awards and honors ==
Pirate received four battle stars for Korean War service.
