= USS Token =

Minesweeper of the United States Navy

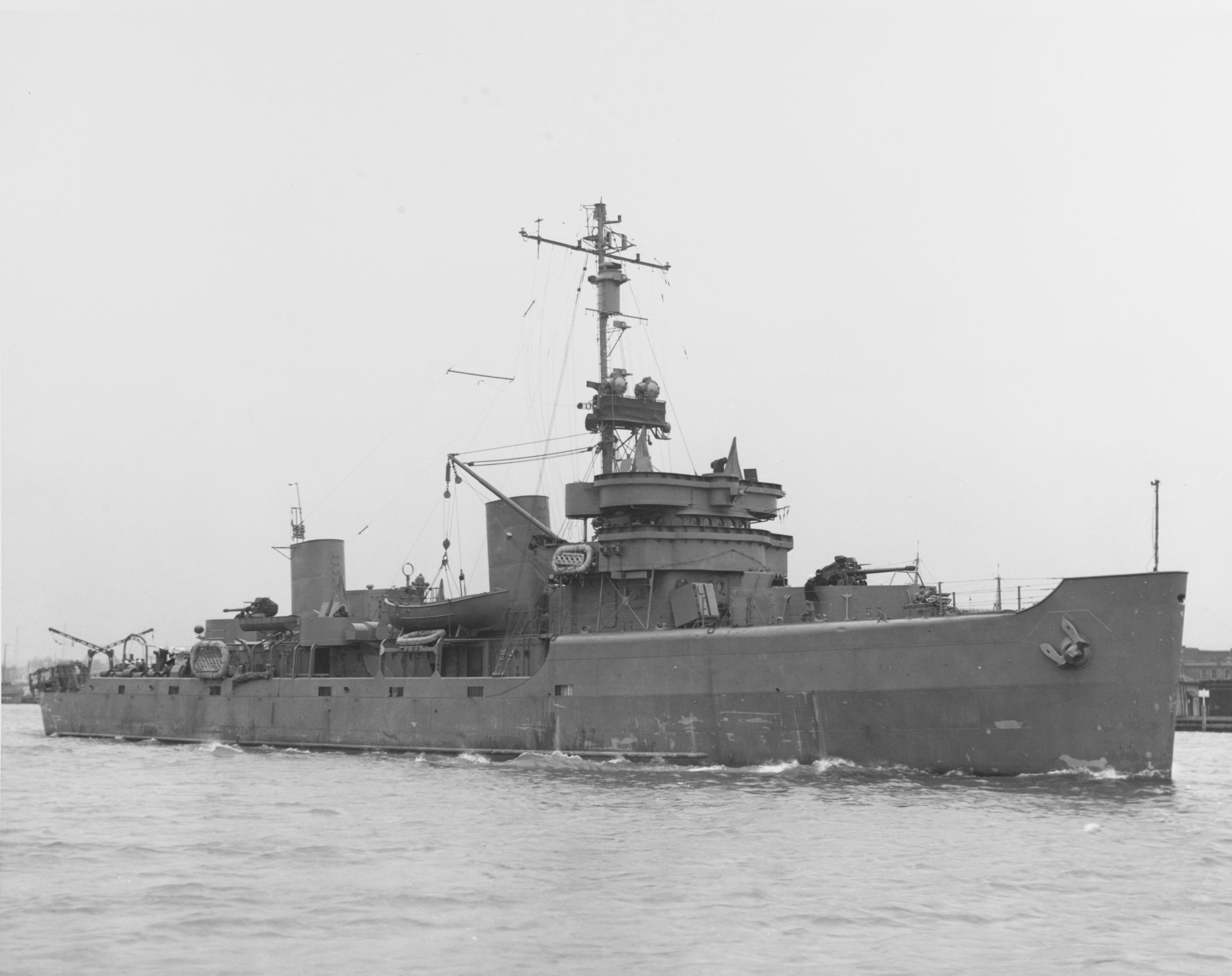
- Token underway off the Norfolk Navy Yard, Virginia, 21 March 1943

History

United States
- Name: USS Token
- Builder: Gulf Shipbuilding Corporation, Chickasaw, Alabama
- Laid down: 21 July 1941
- Launched: 28 March 1942
- Commissioned: 31 December 1942
- Decommissioned: 6 January 1948
- Recommissioned: 12 April 1951
- Decommissioned: 16 April 1954
- Reclassified: MSF-126, 7 February 1955
- Stricken: 1 December 1966
- Honours and awards: 4 battle stars (World War II)

General characteristics
- Class & type: Auk-class minesweeper
- Displacement: 890 long tons (904 t)
- Length: 221 ft 3 in (67.44 m)
- Beam: 32 ft (9.8 m)
- Draft: 10 ft 9 in (3.28 m)
- Speed: 18 knots (33 km/h; 21 mph)
- Complement: 102 officers and enlisted
- Armament: 2 × 3"/50 caliber gun; 4 × 20 mm guns; 2 × Depth charge tracks; 4 × depth charge projectors

USS Token (AM-126) was an Auk-class minesweeper acquired by the United States Navy for the dangerous task of removing mines from minefields laid in the water to prevent ships from passing.

Token was laid down on 21 July 1941 at Chickasaw, Alabama, by the Gulf Shipbuilding Corporation; launched on 28 March 1942; sponsored by Mrs. Charles Hunt Ross; and commissioned on 31 December 1942.

== World War II Pacific Theatre operations ==
After shakedown cruises off the Florida coast and in the Gulf of Mexico, the new minesweeper steamed from Miami, Florida on 2 April 1943; transited the Panama Canal; and arrived at San Francisco, California on 1 May. Following training and escort duty in western coastal waters, she departed San Francisco on 28 August for the New Hebrides. From October until the following June, Token escorted convoys between Espiritu Santo and Guadalcanal. Late in June, she proceeded via Florida Island to Sydney, Australia. A severe vibration developed en route, and Token's stay in Sydney was prolonged for the replacement of bent and damaged propeller blades. She departed Sydney on 30 July 1944 and proceeded to the Solomons, where she spent the month of August conducting exercises and undergoing additional repairs.

== Leyte Gulf minesweeping ==
In September, Token engaged in minesweeping in the Palau and Ulithi island groups before proceeding to Manus where the U.S. 7th Fleet was concentrating for the invasion of Leyte. On 17 October, while conducting minesweeping operations en route to Leyte, Token was caught in a typhoon which caused her some minor damage. Following two days of minesweeping in Leyte Gulf, Token anchored in the south transport area off Leyte on 24 October. The next day, Token scored several hits on an enemy aircraft and rescued a downed flier from the escort carrier USS Sangamon. Heavy air activity continued until Token got underway for the Admiralties arriving at Manus on 5 November.

== Overhaul in the States ==
Token steamed from Manus on 14 November and proceeded via Pearl Harbor, Hawaii and San Francisco to Portland, Oregon, where she underwent major overhaul. On 13 April, Token departed the U.S. West Coast for Pearl Harbor where she resumed escort duty.

== Final Pacific Theatre operations ==
Arriving off Okinawa on 20 May 1945, at a time of mass kamikaze attacks, Token experienced her first of many days of enemy air activity. While performing screening activities on 28 May, Token rescued and captured two survivors from a splashed Japanese aircraft. After repairs at Kerama Retto in June, she swept waters off Okinawa, in the East China Sea, and in Tokyo Bay.

Token was the second surface vessel to enter Tokyo Bay, on 2 September 1945, following USS Revenge, to sweep the harbor prior to the battleship USS Missouri entering and the signing of the surrender document by Japan.

Token came alongside USS Missouri on the morning of 2 September 1945 and took on a load of fresh water before heading to Tokyo Harbor. Token and Revenge then raced to see which ship could enter the harbor first. But Token received a message from Admiral Halsey's staff to back off and let Revenge enter first.

In the following months, Token continued sweeps of formerly contested waters off the Pescadores and China before steaming – via Sasebo, Kyūshū, and Pearl Harbor – to Charleston, South Carolina.

== First decommissioning ==
She then operated off the east coast of the United States until finally berthing in June 1947 at Orange, Texas, where she was assigned to the Atlantic Reserve Fleet, Texas Group, and placed out of commission on 6 January 1948.

== Atlantic Ocean operations ==
Recommissioned on 12 April 1951, Token participated in training exercises off Charleston, South Carolina, in company with Mine Squadron 8, Mine Force, Atlantic Fleet. Departing from Charleston in August, Token headed for the Mediterranean and touched at Gibraltar, Istanbul, Naples, Italy, and Seville before returning to Charleston on 7 February 1953.

== Final decommissioning ==
She operated off the Atlantic and U.S. Gulf Coasts before being inactivated and decommissioned again on 16 April 1954. Token was reclassified a steel-hulled fleet minesweeper on 7 February 1955 and re-esignated MSF-126. Her name was struck from the Navy list on 1 December 1966.

== Awards ==
Token received four battle stars during her participation in World War II.
