= Commissioner v. Flowers =

- Supreme Court of the United States

Argued December 11–12, 1945 Decided January 2, 1946
- Full case name: Commissioner of Internal Revenue v. Flowers
- Citations: 326 U.S. 465 (more) 66 S. Ct. 250; 90 L. Ed. 203; 1946 U.S. LEXIS 3143

Case history
- Prior: Flowers v. Comm'r, 148 F.2d 163 (5th Cir. 1945); cert. granted, 326 U.S. 701 (1945).
- Subsequent: Rehearing denied, 326 U.S. 812 (1946).

Holding
- In order to deduct the expense of traveling under §162, the expense must be incurred while away from home, and must be a reasonable expense necessary or appropriate to the development and pursuit of a trade or business.

Court membership
- Chief Justice Harlan F. Stone Associate Justices Hugo Black · Stanley F. Reed; Felix Frankfurter · William O. Douglas; Frank Murphy · Robert H. Jackson; Wiley B. Rutledge · Harold H. Burton

Case opinions
- Majority: Murphy
- Dissent: Rutledge
- Jackson took no part in the consideration or decision of the case.

Laws applied
- 26 U.S.C. § 23(a)(1)(A); 26 U.S.C. § 162(a)(2) (current)

Commissioner v. Flowers, 326 U.S. 465 (1946), was a Federal income tax case before the Supreme Court of the United States. The Court held that in order to deduct the expense of traveling under § 162 of the Internal Revenue Code, the expense must be incurred while away from home, and must be a reasonable expense necessary or appropriate to the development and pursuit of a trade or business. In this case, the attorney in question could only deduct traveling expenses from her gross income when the railroad's business forced attorney to travel and live temporarily at some place other than the railroad's principal place of business. Where attorney preferred for personal reasons to live in a different state from the location of his employer's principal office, and his duties required frequent trips to that office, the evidence sustained Tax Court's finding that the necessary relation between expenses of such trips and the railroad's business was lacking.

== Background ==
The taxpayer lived and practiced law in Jackson, Mississippi for a railroad. The railroad's home offices were in Mobile, Alabama. The taxpayer was offered a job in Mobile (185 miles from Jackson), but was unwilling to move from Jackson. The taxpayer arranged, with the railroad, to stay in Jackson on the condition that he pay his own traveling expenses between Mobile and Jackson and his own living expenses in both places. The taxpayer deducted the amounts incurred to travel between Jackson and Mobile as traveling expenses under §162(a)(2) of the Internal Revenue Code.

== Opinion of the Court ==
The Court heard the issue of whether the taxpayer could deduct the costs incurred to travel between Jackson and Mobile from his taxes. The Supreme Court held that the expenses could not be deducted on the ground that the expenses in question had been incurred by the taxpayer for his own convenience rather than for business reasons. The relevant test for deductibility was whether the travel had been motivated by “exigencies of business” or by considerations of personal preference. The court opined, “[t]he facts demonstrate clearly that the expenses were not incurred in the pursuit of the business of the taxpayer's employer, the railroad.” The court further held that the expenses in question “…were incurred solely as the result of the taxpayer’s desire to maintain a home in Jackson while working in Mobile, a factor irrelevant to the maintenance and prosecution of the railroad’s legal business.” The court determined that the relevant test for deductibility was whether the travel had been motivated by “exigencies of business” or by considerations of personal preference.

== Relevant Statutes ==
Today: 26 U.S.C. § 162(a)(2): [T]raveling expenses (including amounts expended for meals and lodging other than amounts which are lavish or extravagant under the circumstances) while away from home on the pursuit of a trade or business.

Predecessor: (at the time of this case:) 26 U.S.C.S. § 23(a)(1)(A) (1) The expense must be a reasonable and necessary traveling expense, as that term is generally understood. This includes such items as transportation fares and food and lodging expenses incurred while traveling. (2) The expense must be incurred while away from home. (3) The expense must be incurred in pursuit of business.

== See also ==
- List of United States Supreme Court cases, volume 326
- Chirelstein pp112–115
