= List of United States Supreme Court cases, volume 326 =

This is a list of all the United States Supreme Court cases from volume 326 of the United States Reports:

Case name	Citation	Date decided
Associated Press v. United States	326 U.S. 1	1945
ICC v. Parker	326 U.S. 60	1945
American Trucking Ass'ns, Inc. v. United States	326 U.S. 77	1945
Railway Mail Ass'n v. Corsi	326 U.S. 88	1945
Guaranty Trust Co. v. York	326 U.S. 99	1945
Radio Station WOW, Inc. v. Johnson	326 U.S. 120	1945
Bridges v. Wixon	326 U.S. 135	1945
Barrett Line, Inc. v. United States	326 U.S. 179	1945
Bailey v. Anderson	326 U.S. 203	1945
Asbury Hosp. v. Cass Cnty.	326 U.S. 207	1945
Chickasaw Nation v. United States	326 U.S. 217	1945
Levers v. Anderson	326 U.S. 219	1945
In re Michael	326 U.S. 224	1945
East N.Y. Sav. Bank v. Hahn	326 U.S. 230	1945
United States v. Detroit & C. Nav. Co.	326 U.S. 236	1945
General Elec. Co. v. Jewel Incandescent Lamp Co.	326 U.S. 242	1945
Scott Paper Co. v. Marcalus Mfg. Co.	326 U.S. 249	1945
Glass City Bank v. United States	326 U.S. 265	1945
Hawk v. Olson	326 U.S. 271	1945
BBB v. United States	326 U.S. 279	1945
Boehm v. IRS	326 U.S. 287	1945
Gange Lumber Co. v. Rowley	326 U.S. 295	1945
International Shoe Co. v. Washington	326 U.S. 310	1945
Ashbacker Radio Corp. v. FCC	326 U.S. 327	1945
Fernandez v. Wiener	326 U.S. 340	1945
United States v. Rompel	326 U.S. 367	1945
Mine Safety Appliances Co. v. Forrestal	326 U.S. 371	1945
May Dept. Stores Co. v. NLRB	326 U.S. 376	1945
Markham v. Cabell	326 U.S. 404	1945
Hercules Gasoline Co. v. Comm'r	326 U.S. 425	1945
Schenley Distillers Corp. v. United States	326 U.S. 432	1946
Mississippi Publ'g Corp. v. Murphree	326 U.S. 438	1946
Railroad Retirement Bd. v. Duquesne Warehouse Co.	326 U.S. 446	1946
Chatwin v. United States	326 U.S. 455	1946
Commissioner v. Flowers	326 U.S. 465	1946
Commissioner v. Estate of Holmes	326 U.S. 480	1946
Markham v. Allen	326 U.S. 490	1946
New York ex rel. Ray v. Martin	326 U.S. 496	1946
Marsh v. Alabama	326 U.S. 501	1946
Tucker v. Texas	326 U.S. 517	1946
John Kelley Co. v. Commissioner	326 U.S. 521	1946
Mason v. Paradise Irrigation Dist.	326 U.S. 536	1946
Williams v. Green Bay & W.R.R. Co.	326 U.S. 549	1946
Railway Conductors v. Pitney	326 U.S. 561	1946
New York v. United States (1946)	326 U.S. 572	1946
Kirby Petrol. Co. v. Commissioner	326 U.S. 599	1946
Bollenbach v. United States	326 U.S. 607	1946
Hillsborough v. Cromwell	326 U.S. 620	1946
Allen v. Trust Co.	326 U.S. 630	1946
United States v. New York Tel. Co.	326 U.S. 638	1946
Roland Elec. Co. v. Walling	326 U.S. 657	1946
