= USS Pivot (AM-276) =

Minesweeper of the United States Navy

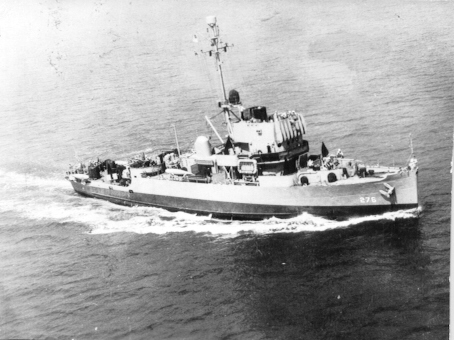
- USS Pivot (AM-276)

History

United States
- Name: USS Pivot (AM-276)
- Builder: Gulf Shipbuilding Corporation; Chickasaw, Alabama
- Laid down: 1 July 1943
- Launched: 11 November 1943
- Sponsored by: Mrs. Clara L. Prouty
- Commissioned: 12 July 1944
- Decommissioned: 6 November 1946
- Honors and awards: 4 battle stars in World War II
- Fate: transferred to the Republic of China, 27 August 1947

History

Taiwan
- Name: ROCS Yung Shou
- Acquired: 27 August 1948
- Decommissioned: 1 July 1970
- Fate: Scrapped

General characteristics
- Class & type: Admirable-class minesweeper
- Displacement: 625 tons
- Length: 184 ft 6 in (56.24 m)
- Beam: 33 ft (10 m)
- Draft: 10 ft (3.0 m)
- Propulsion: 2 × 1,710 shp (1.3 MW) Cooper-Bessemer diesel engines; 2 × shafts.
- Speed: 15 knots (28 km/h)
- Complement: 104 officers and men
- Armament: 1 × 3"/50 caliber gun; 6 × Oerlikon 20 mm cannon; 4 × Bofors 40 mm gun; 1 × hedgehog; 4 × Depth charge projectors; 2 × Depth charge racks; 2 × Minesweeping paravanes

USS Pivot (AM-276) was an Admirable-class minesweeper, and the first ship of the United States Navy named Pivot. She was built at the Gulf Shipbuilding Corporation, Chickasaw, Alabama and christened on 11 November 1943 by Mrs Clara L Prouty. Trials started on 12 July 1944 in the Gulf of Mexico and she worked up in the Chesapeake Bay.

After shakedown, she operated with the Atlantic Fleet training and patrolling until sailing for the Pacific early in April 1945. She transited the Panama Canal on 10 April 1945 and after training in Hawaiian waters reached the war zone in time for mine sweeping operations around the Ryukyus after the Battle of Okinawa.

She supported Admiral Marc Mitscher's Fast Carrier Task Force during the strikes against Japan in July and operated in Korean waters after Japan's surrender, returning to Okinawa in October and resumed mine sweeping operations in the Ryukyus and receiving four battle stars for World War II.

Pivot was decommissioned 6 November 1946 at Subic Bay, Philippines, sold to Taiwan 27 August 1948 and renamed ROCS Yung Shou. On 1 July 1970, Yung Shou was decommissioned.

== Images ==
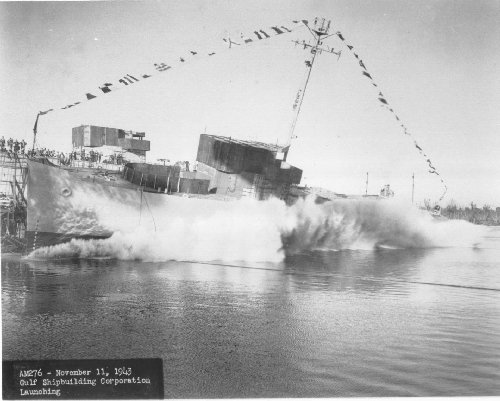
Pivot being launched on 11 November 1943

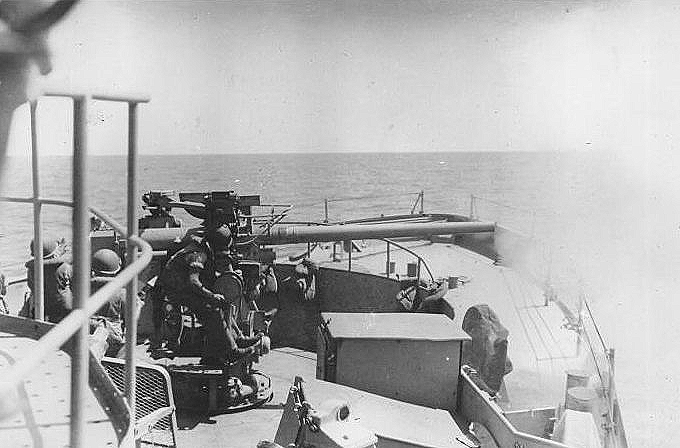
Pivot firing its forward 3"/50 caliber gun.
