= USS PC-1640 =

Patrol boat of the US Navy

Coordinates: 40.7233512°N 29.8351845°E

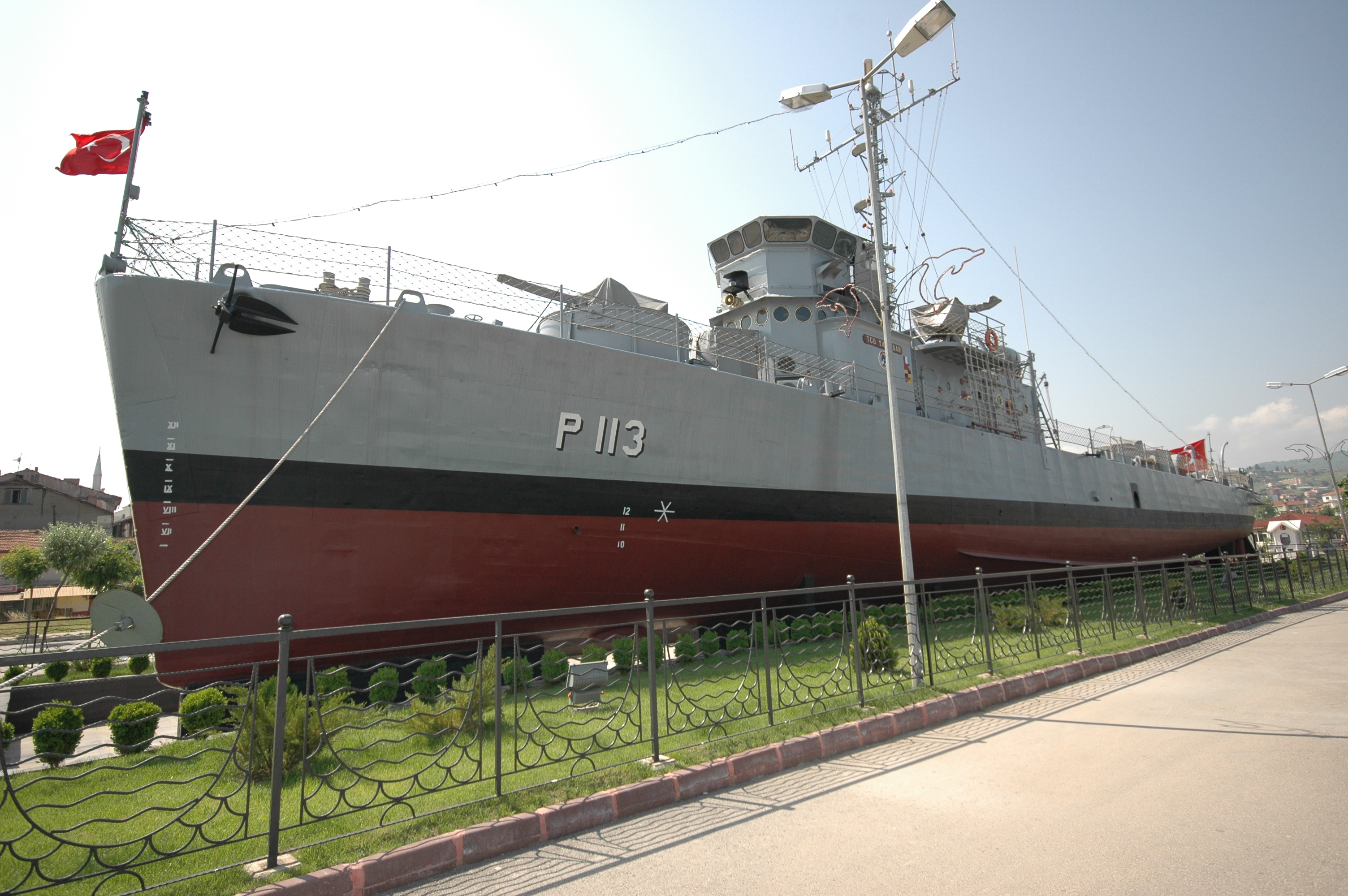
- TCG Yarhisar on 25 May 2007

History

United States
- Name: PC-1640
- Builder: Gunderson Brothers Engineering Corp., Portland
- Laid down: 11 March 1963
- Launched: 14 May 1964
- Commissioned: 27 August 1964
- Decommissioned: 18 July 1965
- Fate: Transferred to Turkish Navy, 18 July 1965

Turkey
- Name: Yarhisar
- Acquired: 18 July 1965
- Commissioned: 18 July 1965
- Decommissioned: 2005
- Identification: Callsign: TBLO; Pennant number: P 113
- Status: Museum ship at Yarhisar Naval Museum, Turkey

General characteristics
- Class & type: PC-1638-class submarine chaser; Hisar-class patrol boat
- Displacement: 295 tons (full load)
- Length: 175 ft (53 m)
- Beam: 23 ft (7.0 m)
- Draft: 10 ft 10 in (3.30 m)
- Propulsion: 2 x 2,400hp ALCO 169X 10AT diesel engines; 2 shafts
- Speed: 20 knots (37 km/h)
- Complement: 59
- Armament: 1 x Mk 15 ASW Hedgehog mortar; 1 × 40 mm gun; 3 × 20 mm cannons; 2 rocket launchers; 4 depth charge projectiles; 2 depth charge tracks

USS PC-1640 was an PC-1638-class submarine chaser in the United States Navy during the Cold War. She was transferred to the Turkish Navy as TCG Yarhisar (P 113) of the Hisar-class patrol boat.

== Construction and commissioning ==
PC-1640 was laid down on 11 March 1963 at Gunderson Brothers Engineering Corps., Portland, Oregon. Launched on 14 May 1964 and commissioned on 27 August 1964.

On 18 July 1965, she was transferred to the Turkish Navy in San Diego and renamed TCG Yarhisar (P 113).

She was decommissioned in 2005.

In 2006, beginning to serve as a museum ship, Turkey's first and only land placed warship museum title. The museum ship is open to visitors today on the coast of Gölcük district of Kocaeli.

== Gallery ==
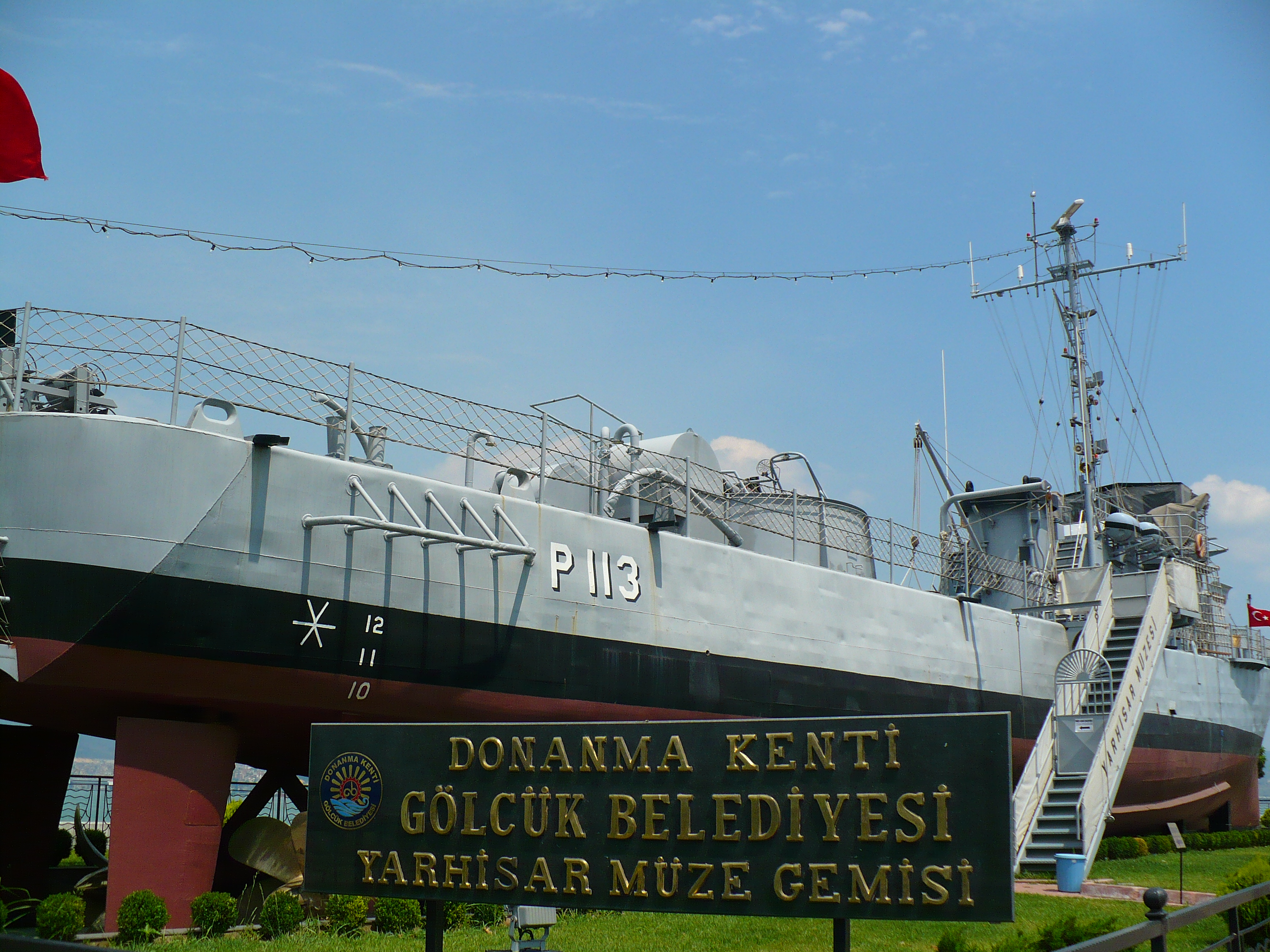

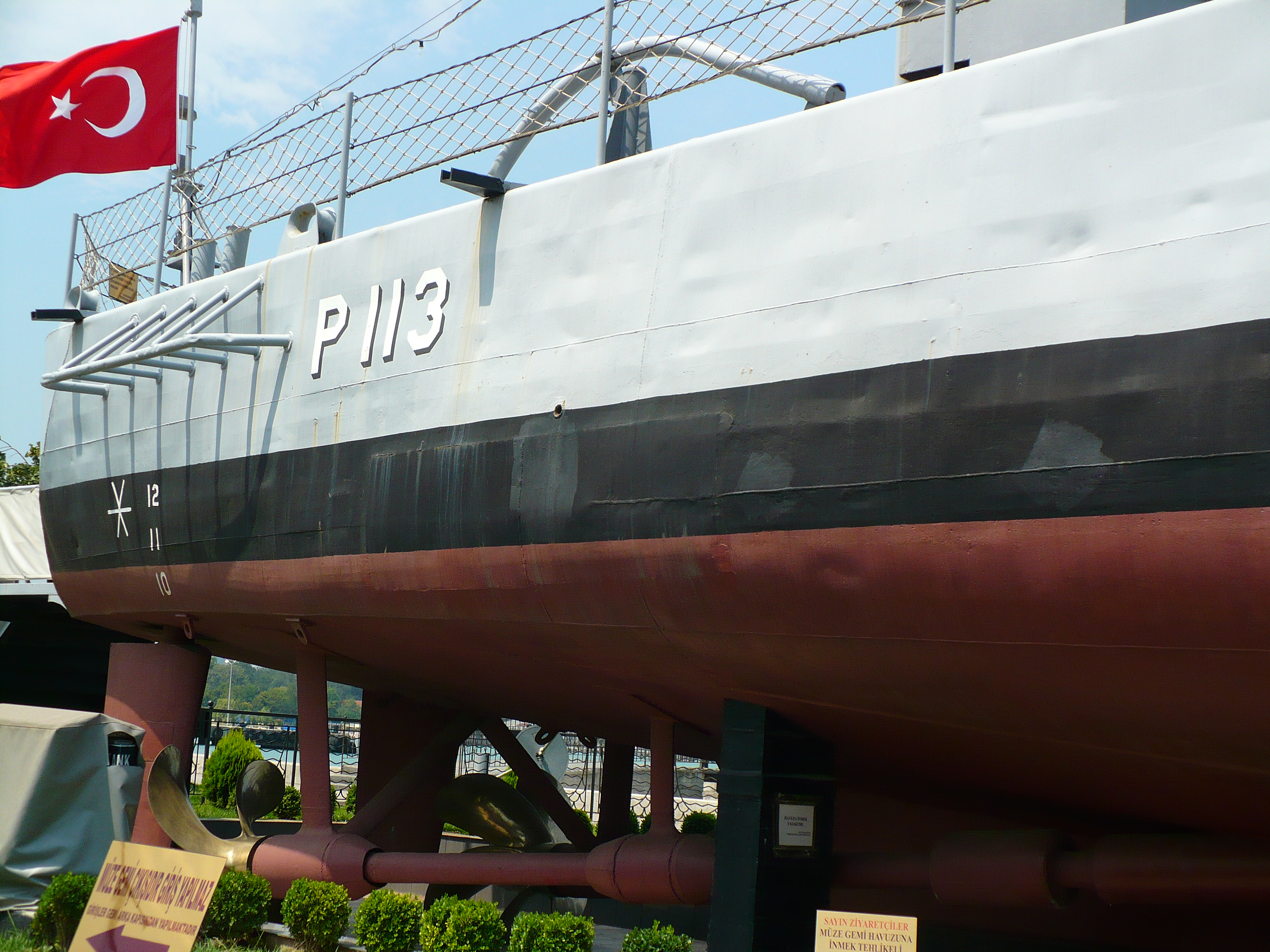

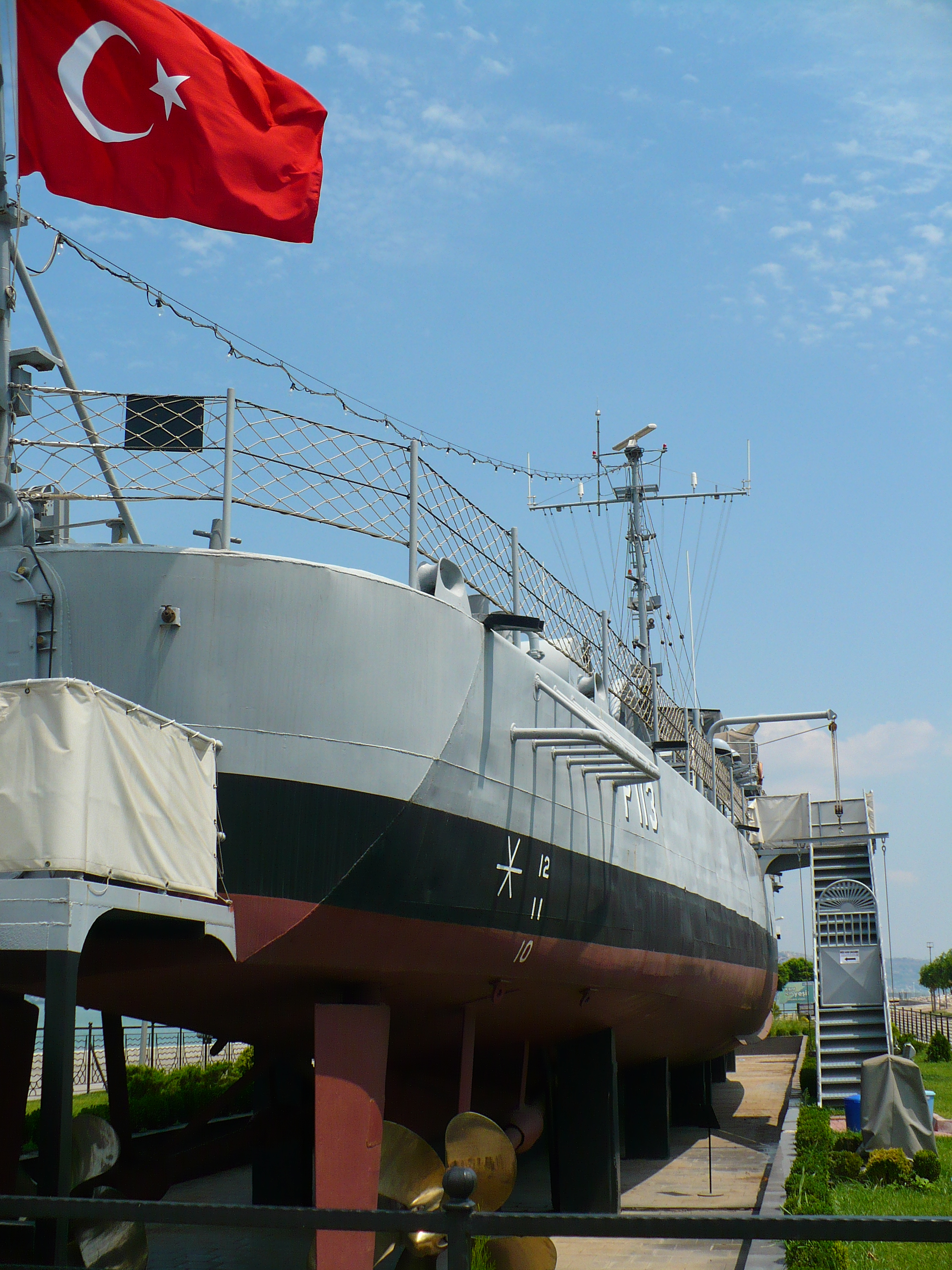

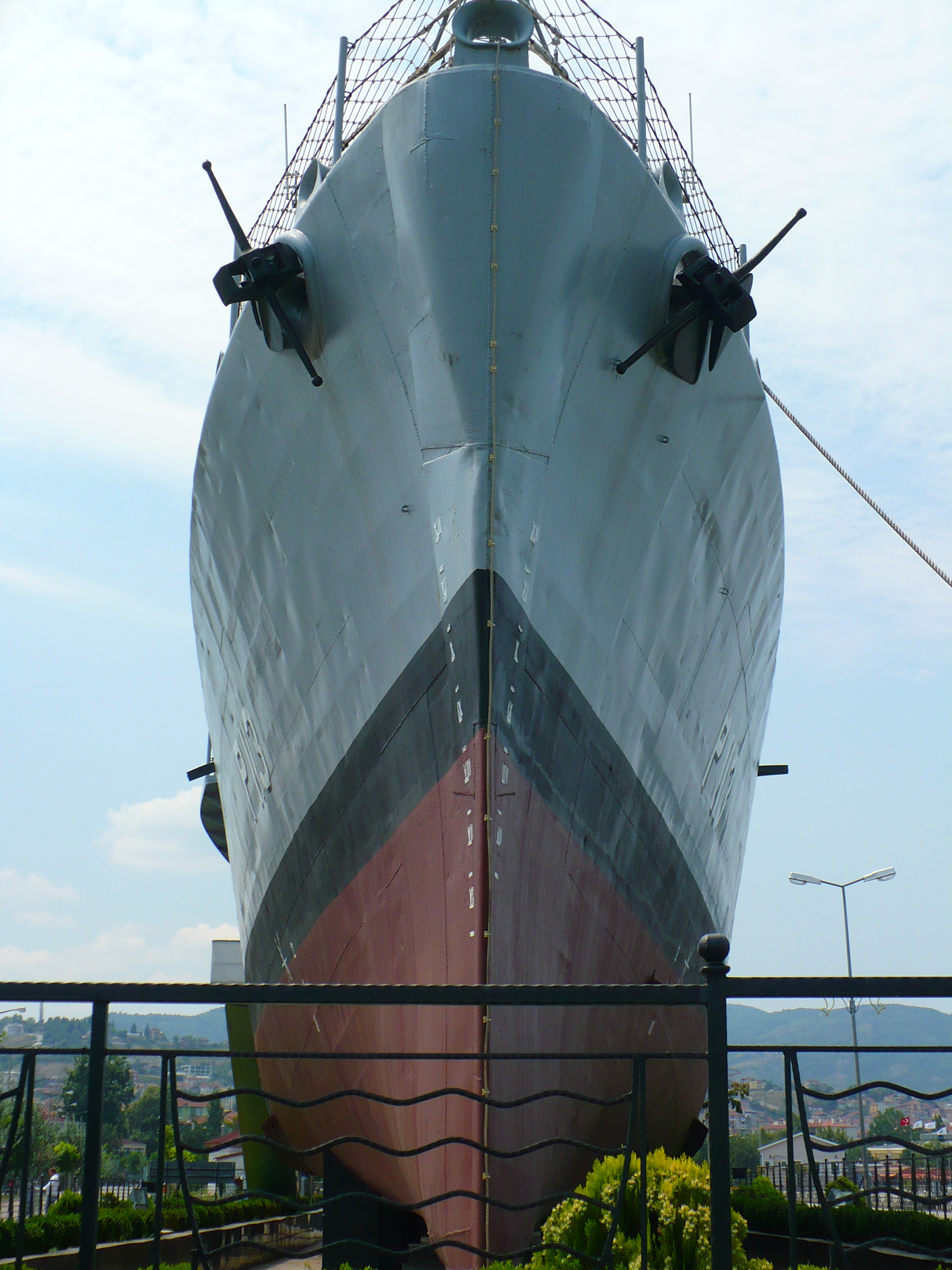

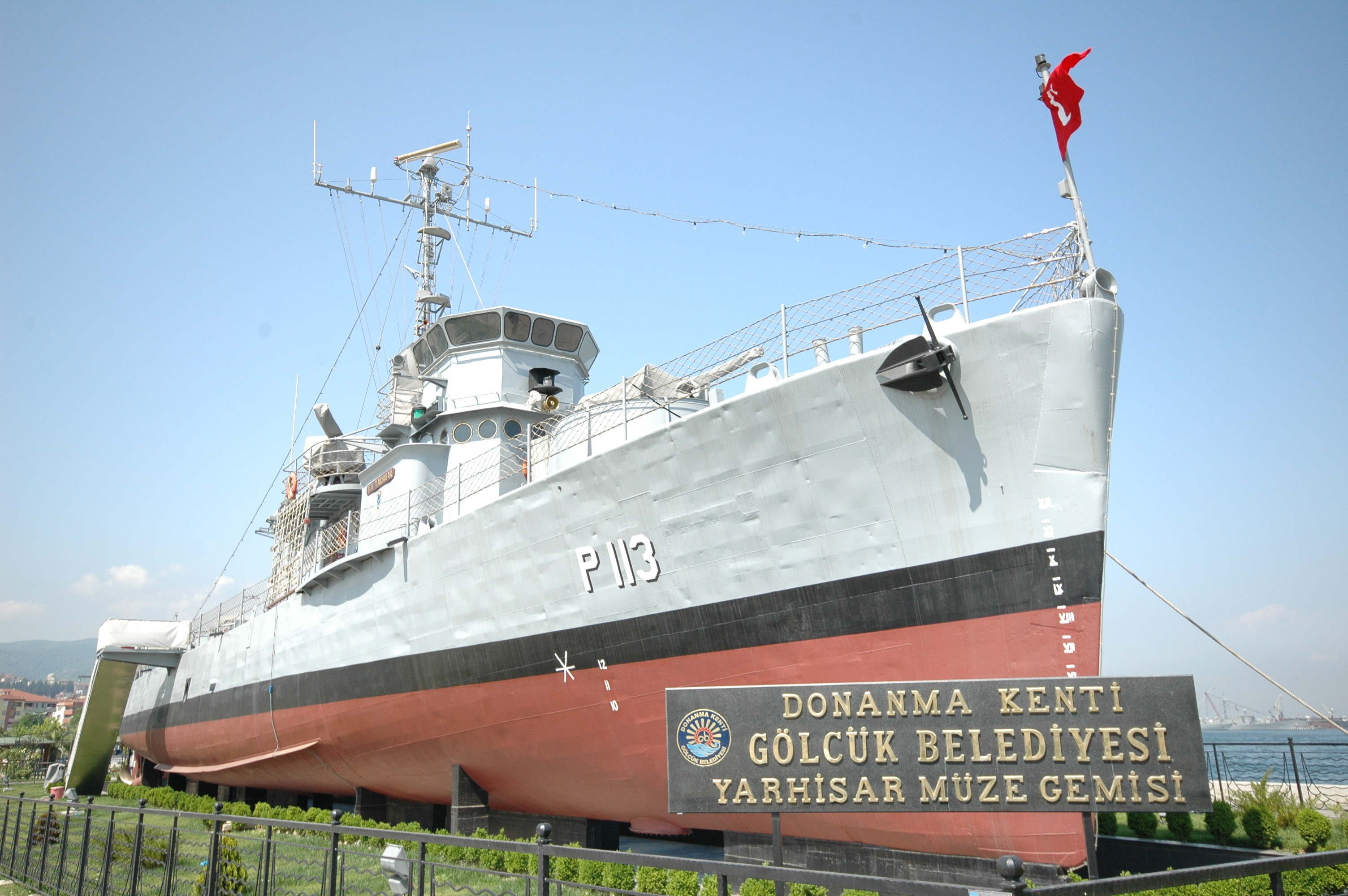

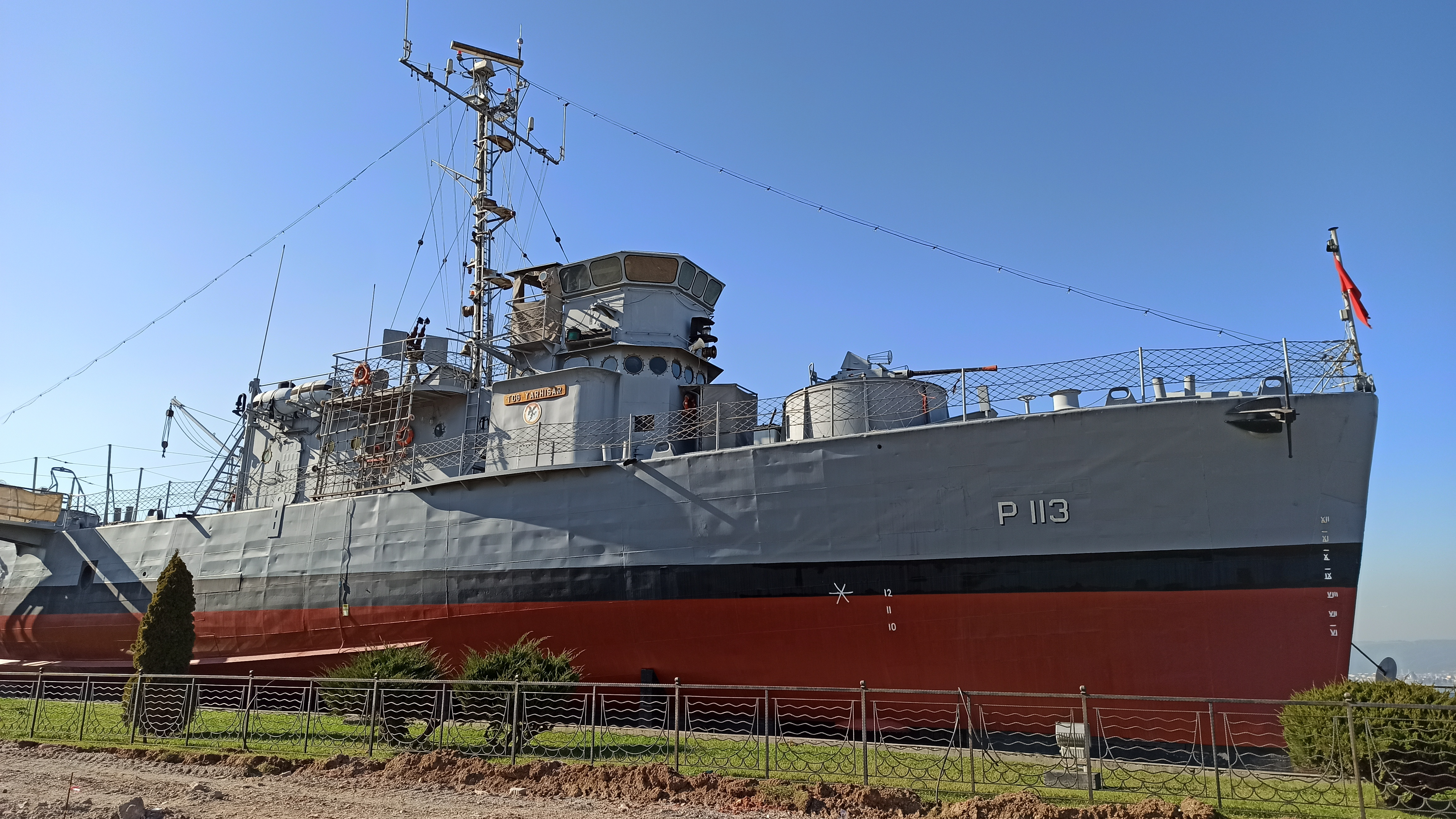

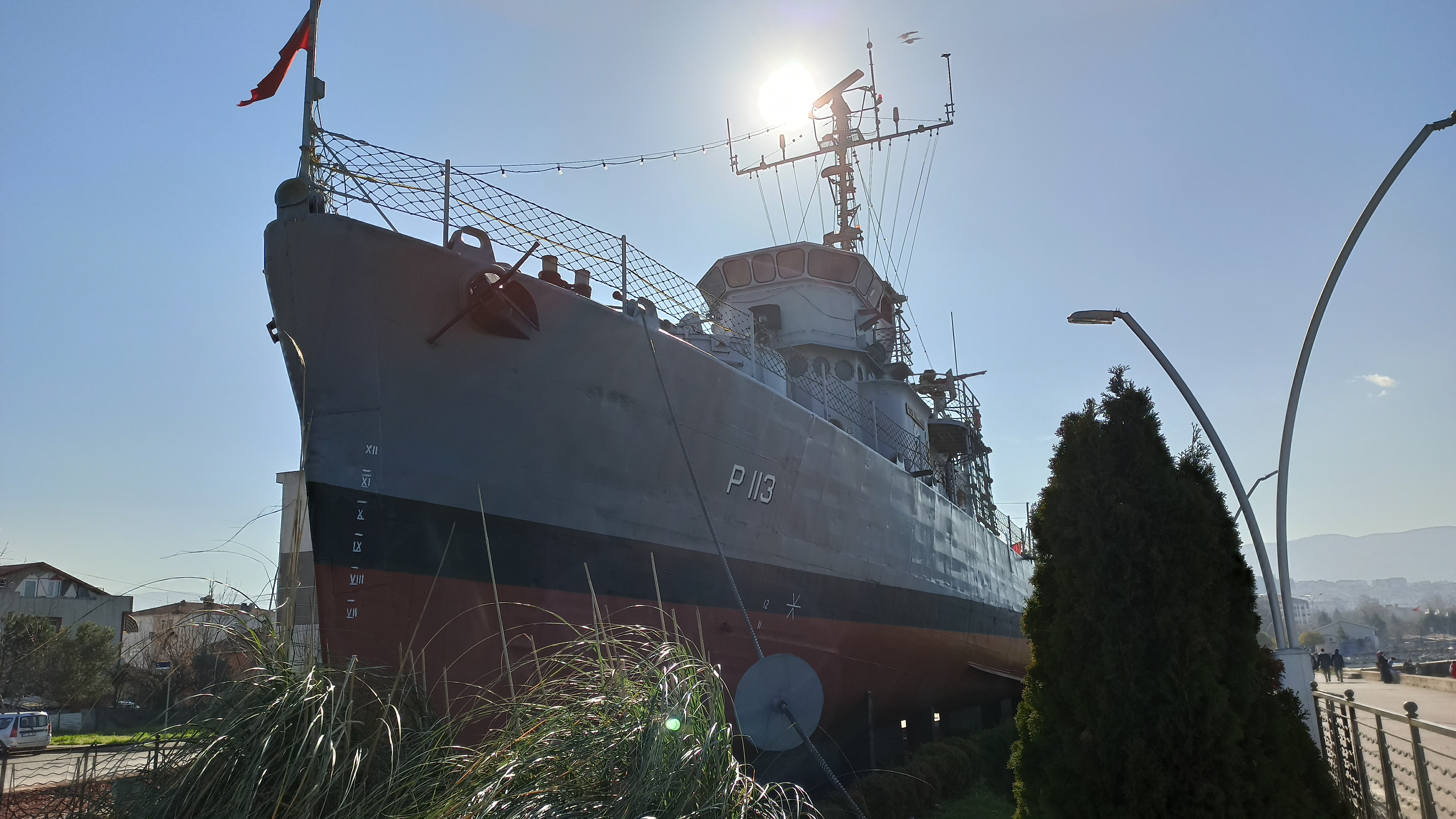

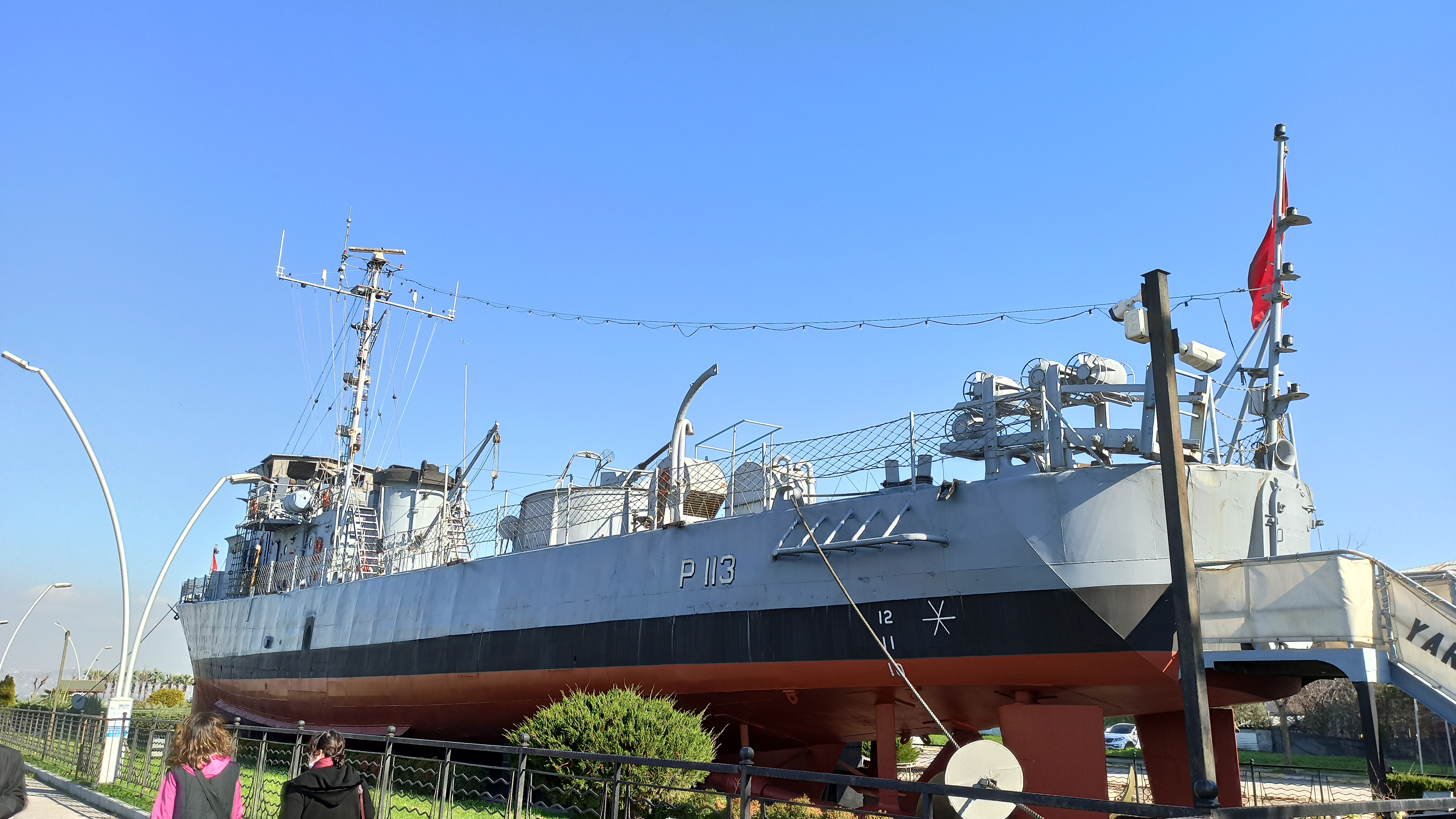
