= Marsh v. Alabama =

- Supreme Court of the United States

Argued December 7, 1945 Decided January 7, 1946
- Full case name: Marsh v. State of Alabama
- Citations: 326 U.S. 501 (more) 66 S. Ct. 276; 90 L. Ed. 265

Case history
- Prior: Defendant found guilty in Alabama Circuit Court; Alabama Court of Appeals affirmed; Alabama Supreme Court denied certiorari
- Subsequent: Reversed and Remanded

Holding
- Constitutional protections of free speech under First and Fourteenth Amendments still apply within the confines of a town owned by a private entity.

Court membership
- Chief Justice Harlan F. Stone Associate Justices Hugo Black · Stanley F. Reed; Felix Frankfurter · William O. Douglas; Frank Murphy · Robert H. Jackson; Wiley B. Rutledge · Harold H. Burton

Case opinions
- Majority: Black, joined by Douglas, Murphy, Rutledge; Frankfurter (in part)
- Concurrence: Frankfurter
- Dissent: Reed, joined by Stone, Burton
- Jackson took no part in the consideration or decision of the case.

Laws applied
- U.S. Const., amend. I, amend. XIV

Marsh v. Alabama, 326 U.S. 501 (1946), was a case decided by the US Supreme Court, which ruled that a state trespassing statute could not be used to prevent the distribution of religious materials on a town's sidewalk even though the sidewalk was part of a privately owned company town. The Court based its ruling on the provisions of the First Amendment and Fourteenth Amendment.

== Background ==
The town of Chickasaw, Alabama, was predominantly a Gulf Shipbuilding Corporation company town near Mobile, Alabama, and was owned and operated by the Gulf Shipbuilding Corporation ("Gulf"). The town exhibited the general characteristics of a more traditional settlement. Its policeman was a deputy from the Mobile County Sheriff's Department who was paid by Gulf. The town was surrounded by a number of adjacent neighborhoods that were not on Gulf property.

The Supreme Court noted that the residents of the non-Gulf neighborhoods were freely allowed to use the company-owned streets and sidewalks to access the town's businesses and facilities.

The appellant, Grace Marsh, a Jehovah's Witness, stood near the post office one day and began distributing religious literature. Marsh was warned that she needed a permit to do so and that none would be issued to her. When she was asked to leave, she refused on the grounds that the company rules against distribution of such materials could not be constitutionally applied to her.

The deputy sheriff arrested her and she was charged with the Alabama criminal code's trespassing equivalent.

During her trial, Marsh contended that the statute could not be constitutionally applied to her, as it would necessarily violate her rights under the First Amendment and the Fourteenth Amendment. That contention was rejected, and Marsh was convicted.

The Alabama Court of Appeals affirmed the conviction by holding that the statute as applied was constitutional because the title to the sidewalk was in the corporation's name. It held that the public use of the sidewalk had not been such as to give rise to a presumption under Alabama law of its irrevocable dedication to the public.

The Alabama Supreme Court denied certiorari, and Marsh then appealed her case to the United States Supreme Court.

== Decision ==
The Court ruled 5–3 in favor of Marsh. The plurality opinion, joined by three justices, was authored by Justice Hugo Black, with Justice Felix Frankfurter writing a concurring opinion and Justice Stanley Forman Reed writing a dissent.

The Court initially noted that it would be an easy case if the town were a more traditional, publicly administered municipality. Then, there would be a clear violation of the right to free speech for the government to bar the sidewalk distribution of such material. The question became, therefore, whether or not constitutional freedom of speech protections could be denied simply because a single company held title to the town.

The state had attempted to analogize the town's rights to the rights of homeowners to regulate the conduct of guests in their home. The Court rejected that contention by noting that ownership "does not always mean absolute dominion". The court pointed out that the more an owner opens his property up to the public in general, the more his rights are circumscribed by the statutory and constitutional rights of those who are invited in.

In its conclusion, the Court stated that it was essentially weighing the rights of property owners against the rights of citizens to enjoy freedom of press and religion. The Court noted that the rights of citizens under the Bill of Rights occupy a preferred position. Accordingly, the Court held that the property rights of a private entity are not sufficient to justify the restriction of a community of citizens' fundamental rights and liberties.

Justice Frankfurter concurred in the Court's opinion with one exception. The majority opinion briefly mentioned the Commerce Clause as possibly being analogous to the case's circumstances. Frankfurter expressed his opinion that it was unnecessary to look to the Commerce Clause for guidance on a First Amendment issue.

Justice Reed started his dissent by noting that constitutional protections for religion, speech, and press are not absolute or unlimited in respect to the manner or the place of their exercise. Furthermore, Reed asserted that property rights, which are also protected by the Constitution, "are not outweighed by the interests of the trespasser, even though he trespasses in behalf of religion or free speech."

== Subsequent history ==
The Marsh holding at first appears somewhat narrow and inapplicable today because of the disappearance of company towns from the United States, but it was raised in a somewhat high-profile 1996 cyberlaw case, Cyber Promotions v. America Online, 948 F. Supp. 436, 442 (E.D. Pa. 1996). Cyber Promotions wished to send out "mass email advertisements" to AOL customers. AOL installed software to block those emails. Cyber Promotions sued on free speech grounds and cited the Marsh case as authority for the proposition that even though AOL's servers were private property, AOL had opened them to the public to such a degree that constitutional free speech protections could be applied. The federal district court disagreed, thereby paving the way for spam filters at the Internet service provider level.

In Lloyd Corp. v. Tanner, the Supreme Court distinguished a private shopping mall from the company town in Marsh and held that the mall had not been sufficiently dedicated to public use for First Amendment free speech rights to apply within it.

The case has been highlighted as a potential precedent to treat online communication media like Facebook as a public space to prevent it from censoring speech. In Manhattan Community Access Corp. v. Halleck the Supreme Court found that private companies only count as state actors for First Amendment purposes if they exercise “powers traditionally exclusive to the state". However, the Court's narrow holding avoided the Facebook issue.

== See also ==
- List of United States Supreme Court cases involving the First Amendment
- List of United States Supreme Court cases, volume 326
