= Chickasaw, Alabama =

City in Alabama, United States

- City
- Seal

- Location in Mobile County, Alabama
- Coordinates: 30°46′17″N 88°04′46″W
- Country: United States
- State: Alabama
- County: Mobile
- Established: 1946

Area
  - Total: 4.56 sq mi (11.80 km^{2})
  - Land: 4.20 sq mi (10.89 km^{2})
  - Water: 0.35 sq mi (0.91 km^{2})
- Elevation: 36 ft (11 m)

Population (2020)
  - Total: 6,457
  - Density: 1,535.0/sq mi (592.66/km^{2})
- Time zone: UTC-6 (Central (CST))
  - Summer (DST): UTC-5 (CDT)
- ZIP codes: 36611, 36671
- Area code: 251
- FIPS code: 01-14392
- GNIS feature ID: 2404045
- Website: www.cityofchickasaw.org

Chickasaw is a city in Mobile County, Alabama, United States. As of the 2020 census the population was 6,457, up from 6,106 at the 2010 census. It is part of the Mobile metropolitan area.

== History ==
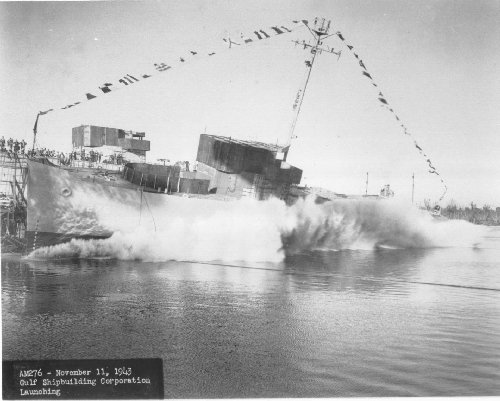
USS Pivot (AM-276) launched at the Gulf Shipbuilding Company, Chickasaw, Alabama, on November 11, 1943. In the background can be seen the USS Pledge (AM-277).

=== Company town ===
In the early 20th century before the city now standing was incorporated, the present site of Chickasaw was a company town, wholly owned by Chickasaw Shipyard and developed for its workers. The property was bought by Gulf Shipbuilding Corporation in 1940. It expanded with the defense buildup during World War II.

It attempted to restrict the activities of Jehovah's Witnesses, the subject of a case that reached the Supreme Court of the United States, Marsh v. Alabama, 326 U.S. 501 (1946). The court ruled that although the Chickasaw Shipyard Village was privately owned, because it functioned as a town open to the public, the right conferred on residents and visitors by the First Amendment to the United States Constitution cannot be abridged.

In 1946 the village was purchased by Leedy Investment Company. It renovated housing and offered it for sale to renters. Some former residents returned to the village and bought houses. It suffered from downturns in shipbuilding, which caused the loss of jobs.

Residents worked to have the village documented, and in 2004 the Chickasaw Shipyard Village Historic District was added to the National Register of Historic Places.

== Geography ==
Chickasaw is located in eastern Mobile County. It is bordered to the east by the city of Mobile, to the south and west by Prichard, and to the north by Saraland. U.S. Route 43 (Telegraph Road and North Craft Highway) is the main road through Chickasaw, leading south 5 miles (8 km) to downtown Mobile and north 60 miles (97 km) to Jackson. Interstate 65 passes through the west side of Chickasaw, with access from Exit 10 (West Lee Street). I-65 leads south into Mobile and northeast 162 miles (261 km) to Montgomery.

According to the U.S. Census Bureau, the city of Chickasaw has a total area of 4.56 square miles (11.8 km^{2}), of which 4.21 square miles (10.9 km^{2}) are land and 0.35 square miles (0.91 km^{2}), or 7.70%, are water. Chickasaw Creek, a tidal arm of the Mobile River, forms the northeast border of the city. The Port of Chickasaw is in the eastern part of the city, on Chickasaw Creek.

== Demographics ==
Historical population
Census	Pop.	Note	%±
1950	4,920		—
1960	10,002		103.3%
1970	8,447		−15.5%
1980	7,402		−12.4%
1990	6,649		−10.2%
2000	6,364		−4.3%
2010	6,106		−4.1%
2020	6,457		5.7%
2025 (est.)	6,166	▼	−4.5%
U.S. Decennial Census; 2013 Estimate

The city had its peak of population in 1960, when the shipyard was still operating at high capacity. Decline in shipyard jobs has resulted in a decline in overall population since then.

=== Racial and ethnic composition ===
Chickasaw city, Alabama – Racial and ethnic composition Note: the US Census treats Hispanic/Latino as an ethnic category. This table excludes Latinos from the racial categories and assigns them to a separate category. Hispanics/Latinos may be of any race.
Race / Ethnicity (NH = Non-Hispanic)	Pop 1980	Pop 1990	Pop 2000	Pop 2010	Pop 2020	% 1980	% 1990	% 2000	% 2010	% 2020
White alone (NH)	7,341	6,503	5,610	3,782	3,153	99.18%	97.80%	88.15%	61.94%	48.83%
Black or African American alone (NH)	0	27	513	2,036	2,760	0.00%	0.41%	8.06%	33.34%	42.74%
Native American or Alaska Native alone (NH)	6	46	86	46	36	0.08%	0.69%	1.35%	0.75%	0.56%
Asian alone (NH)	4	25	15	33	27	0.05%	0.38%	0.24%	0.54%	0.42%
Native Hawaiian or Pacific Islander alone (NH)	x	x	1	1	1	x	x	0.02%	0.02%	0.02%
Other race alone (NH)	0	0	4	3	27	0.00%	0.00%	0.06%	0.05%	0.42%
Mixed race or Multiracial (NH)	x	x	62	63	264	x	x	0.97%	1.03%	4.09%
Hispanic or Latino (any race)	51	48	73	142	189	0.69%	0.72%	1.15%	2.33%	2.93%
Total	7,402	6,649	6,364	6,106	6,457	100.00%	100.00%	100.00%	100.00%	100.00%

=== 2020 census ===
As of the 2020 census, Chickasaw had a population of 6,457. The median age was 36.0 years. 26.9% of residents were under the age of 18 and 15.5% of residents were 65 years of age or older. For every 100 females there were 85.0 males, and for every 100 females age 18 and over there were 79.5 males age 18 and over.

99.3% of residents lived in urban areas, while 0.7% lived in rural areas.

There were 2,589 households in Chickasaw, including 1,246 families; 36.7% had children under the age of 18 living with them. Of all households, 30.0% were married-couple households, 19.9% were households with a male householder and no spouse or partner present, and 43.1% were households with a female householder and no spouse or partner present. About 30.5% of all households were made up of individuals and 12.3% had someone living alone who was 65 years of age or older.

There were 2,902 housing units, of which 10.8% were vacant. The homeowner vacancy rate was 2.7% and the rental vacancy rate was 7.8%.

=== 2010 census ===
As of the census of 2010, there were 6,106 people, 2,430 households, and 1,612 families living in the city. The population density was 13,877 people per square mile (5,358 people/km^{2}). There were 2,879 housing units at an average density of 654.3 units per square mile (252.6 units/km^{2}). The racial makeup of the city was 63.0% White, 33.6% Black or African American, .8% Native American, 0.5% Asian, 0.0% Pacific Islander, 0.9% from other races, and 1.2% from two or more races. 2.3% of the population were Hispanic or Latino of any race.

There were 2,430 households, out of which 29.2% had children under the age of 18 living with them, 39.2% were married couples living together, 22.6% had a female householder with no husband present, and 33.7% were non-families. 29.5% of all households were made up of individuals, and 12.5% had someone living alone who was 65 years of age or older. The average household size was 2.51 and the average family size was 3.12.

In the city, the population dispersal was 26.9% under the age of 18, 8.9% from 18 to 24, 25.2% from 25 to 44, 24.2% from 45 to 64, and 14.8% who were 65 years of age or older. The median age was 35.1 years. For every 100 females, there were 86.0 males. For every 100 females age 18 and over, there were 87.3 males.

The median income for a household in the city was $33,061, and the median income for a family was $40,625. Males had a median income of $35,300 versus $25,369 for females. The per capita income for the city was $18,105. About 18.9% of families and 20.7% of the population were below the poverty line, including 30.0% of those under age 18 and 11.0% of those age 65 or over. The median home price was an estimated $83,800 in 2010. The rent burden was 47.9%.

=== 2000 census ===
As of the census of 2000, there were 6,364 people, 2,747 households, and 1,747 families living in the city. The population density was 1,436.3 inhabitants per square mile (554.6/km^{2}). There were 2,989 housing units at an average density of 674.6 units per square mile (260.5 units/km^{2}). The racial makeup of the city was 88.89% White, 8.12% Black or African American, 1.35% Native American, 0.24% Asian, 0.02% Pacific Islander, 0.30% from other races, and 1.08% from two or more races. 1.15% of the population were Hispanic or Latino of any race.

There were 2,747 households, out of which 26.5% had children under the age of 18 living with them, 44.6% were married couples living together, 15.4% had a female householder with no husband present, and 36.4% were non-families. 32.9% of all households were made up of individuals, and 18.4% had someone living alone who was 65 years of age or older. The average household size was 2.31 and the average family size was 2.95.

In the city, the population dispersal was 23.6% under the age of 18, 8.5% from 18 to 24, 26.0% from 25 to 44, 20.3% from 45 to 64, and 21.5% who were 65 years of age or older. The median age was 39 years. For every 100 females, there were 86.3 males. For every 100 females age 18 and over, there were 79.0 males. The median income for a household in the city was $27,036, and the median income for a family was $33,125. Males had a median income of $29,074 versus $21,181 for females. The per capita income for the city was $14,190. About 13.0% of families and 17.1% of the population were below the poverty line, including 25.1% of those under age 18 and 13.9% of those age 65 or over.

== Education ==
Chickasaw's public schools are within the Chickasaw City Schools district. The city voted in 2012 to form its own school system with Satsuma, Alabama, leaving that operated by Mobile County School Board.

=== History of schools ===
Chickasaw's public schools were previously operated by the Mobile County Public School System. Hamilton Elementary School was within the Chickasaw city limits and serves Chickasaw residents. In addition two magnet schools, the elementary Chickasaw School of Mathematics and Science and the Clark School of Mathematics, Science and Technology (high school), were in the city. Residents zoned to Hamilton are also zoned to Chastang Middle School.

Several years prior to 2009, officials of Chickasaw, Satsuma, and Saraland contemplated forming the "Delta School District." Around 2009 Chickasaw officials considered a plan to secede from the Mobile County school system, after Mobile County officials considered closing the Chickasaw magnets, which together have a combined total of 14% Chickasaw residents. The remainder of the students came from other locations, including the unincorporated area of Grand Bay. Mobile County considered moving the magnets to Shaw High School in western Mobile.

Chickasaw did separate from the Mobile County school system, effective in 2013, with the understanding that the elementary Chickasaw School of Mathematics and Science would be relocated from Chickasaw within four years. While it remained, the residents of Chickasaw were required to pay $2,200 per year per child in order to attend the school, as they were no longer part of the county system. In January 2013 the Mobile County school board decided to move the elementary Mathematics and Science school to the former Howard Elementary School near Downtown Mobile.

=== Notable person ===
- Ray Sawyer of the band Dr. Hook and the Medicine Show was born in Chickasaw in 1937.

== See also ==
- Bible Belt
