= Gulf Shipbuilding Corporation =

Defunct American shipbuilding corporation

Gulf Shipbuilding Corporation is a former shipbuilding corporation in Chickasaw, Alabama a few miles upstream of the Port of Mobile. Following the company's closure, the land became a part of the Chickasaw Shipyard Village Historic District.

== History ==
=== Chickasaw Shipbuilding and Car Company ===
Prior to the outbreak of World War I, the Tennessee Coal and Iron Company, a division of U.S. Steel in Birmingham, Alabama, recognized the opportunities which the Chickasaw area provided for shipbuilding with its location and deep waterway. On August 17, 1917, the company announced that a shipyard would be constructed in Chickasaw. Steel would be provided from the Fairfield, Alabama site of Tennessee Coal and Iron. A large area of land, including the location of the future city of Chickasaw, was purchased. In order to develop the shipbuilding business and the supporting infrastructure, three companies—Chickasaw Shipbuilding and Car Company, Chickasaw Utilities Company, and Chickasaw Land Company—were formed. Federal Shipbuilding developed the shipyard with twenty million dollars from the United States Navy.

The cypress swamp adjacent to the stream (Chickasaw Bogue or Chickasaw Creek) was drained, dikes were constructed, and drainage pumps were installed. Simultaneously, a company town was constructed to house and serve the shipyard workers.

Before operations at the shipyard could commence, the Armistice was declared. However, before closing, the Chickasaw Shipbuilding and Car Company produced and launched fourteen cargo ships. While some town occupants left for other opportunities after the shipyard closing, the remaining residents formed a tight-knit community. In April 1939, Mobile businessman Ben May acquired the shipyard and company town.

14 cargo ships for the Isthmian Steamship Company (U.S. Steel)

- Chickasaw City, Birmingham City, Mobile City, Ensley City
- Montgomery City, Tuscaloosa City, Bessemer City, Fairfield City, Selma City
- Anniston City, Atlanta City, Memphis City, Knoxville City, Chattanooga City

=== Gulf Shipbuilding Corporation ===
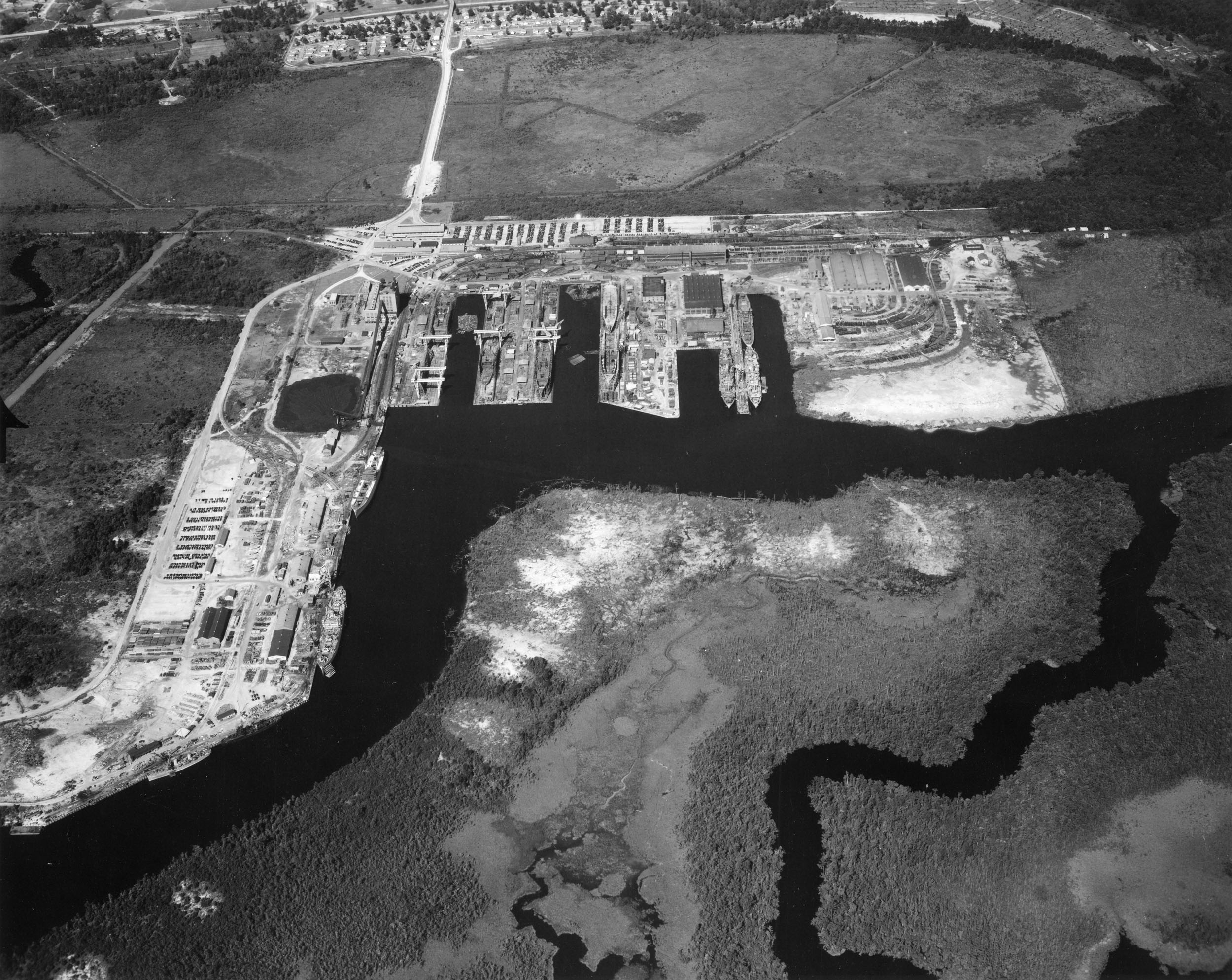
The yard in 1945

In July 1940, the town and shipyard were sold to Gulf Shipbuilding Corporation, a subsidiary of Waterman Steamship Corporation. Both the shipyard and town were renovated by the new owner. The corporation began to receive its first contracts from the Maritime Commission for cargo ships. Later followed the U.S. Navy contracts to build the new Fletcher Class Destroyers. Due to the scale of the operation, a large number of workers migrated to Chickasaw. With production activity at its peak, Gulf Shipbuilding employed between 10,000 and 15,000 workers. This population boom required the introduction of eligibility requirements for living in company-owned properties. Only persons with connection to the shipyard could rent houses from the company while many previous occupants were forced to vacate. To further accommodate the demand for housing, the federal government constructed the Gulf Homes housing project, other temporary housing structures, and Navy barracks. Also, during World War II was produced 36 cargo ships, 7 destroyers, 1 amphibious landing ship and 27 US and 2 Royal Navy Minesweepers. After the war, the number of government contracts dropped and there was a surplus in the market for commercial vessels.

Gulf Shipbuilding produced ships for the United States Maritime Commission and United States Navy as well as for the Royal Navy of the United Kingdom. At the end of World War II, the demand for ships diminished and the shipyard was again closed. The ships produced by Gulf Shipbuilding are summarized below.

- In Chikasaw, Alabama

- United States Maritime Commission
  - 30 of 328 Type C2 (30 of 30 C2-S-E1) all-purpose cargo ships (1942 — 1946)
    - 849, 850

      - 472 ... 485, appropriated for PubL 77-247, MARCOM contracts 1709-1722, 15 Sep 1941, in
      - 1602 ... 1614
      - 2826 (named John B. Waterman)
      - 2827 - 2842 (cancelled)
      - the chaos here seems to originate in the fact that Gulf was contracted to build 4 C2 for the Waterman Steamship Corp. at the same time MARCOM contracts arrived and the earlier built ships were requisitioned after contracts were issued and thus assigned numerically larger hull numbers.

    - e.g. SS Afoundria

  - Type R2 (R2-ST-AU1) refrigerated ships (6 ships delivered from 1945 to 1946)
    - hull numbers: 1648 ... 1653

- United States Navy
  - Fletcher-class destroyers (7 ships delivered from 1943 to 1944)
  - Casa Grande-class dock landing ships (1 ship delivered in 1946, 2 additional ships sold to private owners prior to delivery)

- In Madisonville, Louisiana (30.398636°N 90.155285°W)
  - United States Navy

  - 11 of 95 Auk-class minesweepers (1942 to 1945)
  - 16 of 123 Admirable-class minesweepers (1943 to 1944)
- Royal Navy
  - Catherine-class minesweepers (2 ships delivered in 1943)

=== Grace Marsh incident ===
Except for the fact that Gulf Shipbuilding owned the property, nothing distinguished Chickasaw from other towns and suburbs in the vicinity of Mobile. Since the area was freely accessible with no discernible boundaries separating private and public lands, the shopping areas of Chickasaw became popular to both residents and non-residents of the town.

Grace Marsh, a Jehovah's Witness, and her colleagues began to visit Chickasaw in November 1943. In addition to door-to-door visits, the religious workers would distribute literature (The Watchtower and Consolation) along sidewalks in the business district. Beginning in December 1943, the Witnesses were arrested on multiple occasions and ultimately charged with trespassing.

In January 1944, the Inferior Court of Mobile County found Marsh and the other Witnesses guilty of trespassing. An appeal was filed with the circuit court, the Alabama Thirteenth Judicial Circuit, which refused to consider the constitutional considerations raised by Marsh and allowed the ruling of the lower court to stand. Upon further appeal, the Court of Appeals of Alabama granted certiorari hearing the case in November 1944. The decision in January 1945 confirmed the decision of the lower courts. An application for a rehearing in the Court of Appeals and a subsequent petition to the Alabama Supreme Court were denied.

In May 1945, a petition for appeal was made to the United States Supreme Court. The Court accepted the petition and heard oral arguments within the year (Marsh v. Alabama, 326 U.S. 501 (1946)). Attorneys for Marsh argued that "constitutional inhibitions applicable to municipal ordinances" should apply to Gulf Shipbuilding likewise since it acted as a de facto municipal corporation in its relationship to the public. The Court split 5–3 in favor of Marsh. In his decision, Justice Hugo Black wrote that the most important consideration was that Chickasaw was like "any other American town". The Court had decided that certain fundamental liberties (freedoms of speech, press, and religion) held a preferred position over property rights.

=== Incorporation of Chickasaw ===
Early in 1946, Leedy Investment Company purchased the entire company town for one million dollars. Current occupants were given the option to purchase the homes they had been renting. Many prior residents also purchased homes and moved back to the town. The city of Chickasaw was incorporated on November 12, 1946. In 1979, Halter Marine reactivated the shipbuilding facility to provide service vessels and tugboats to the booming offshore industry. The resurgence was short-lived and the facility was closed again in 1983. The former shipyard now serves as a small general cargo facility.
