= List of United States Navy ships: S =

Ships of the United States Navy

Ships in current service
- Current ships

Ships grouped alphabetically
- A–B; C; D–F; G–H; I–K; L; M; N–O; P; Q–R; S; T–V; W–Z

Ships grouped by type
- Aircraft carriers; Airships; Amphibious warfare ships; Auxiliaries; Battlecruisers; Battleships; Cruisers; Destroyers; Destroyer escorts; Destroyer leaders; Escort carriers; Frigates; Hospital ships; Littoral combat ships; Mine warfare vessels; Monitors; Oilers; Patrol vessels; Registered civilian vessels; Sailing frigates; Steam frigates; Steam gunboats; Ships of the line; Sloops of war; Submarines; Torpedo boats; Torpedo retrievers; Unclassified miscellaneous; Yard and district craft

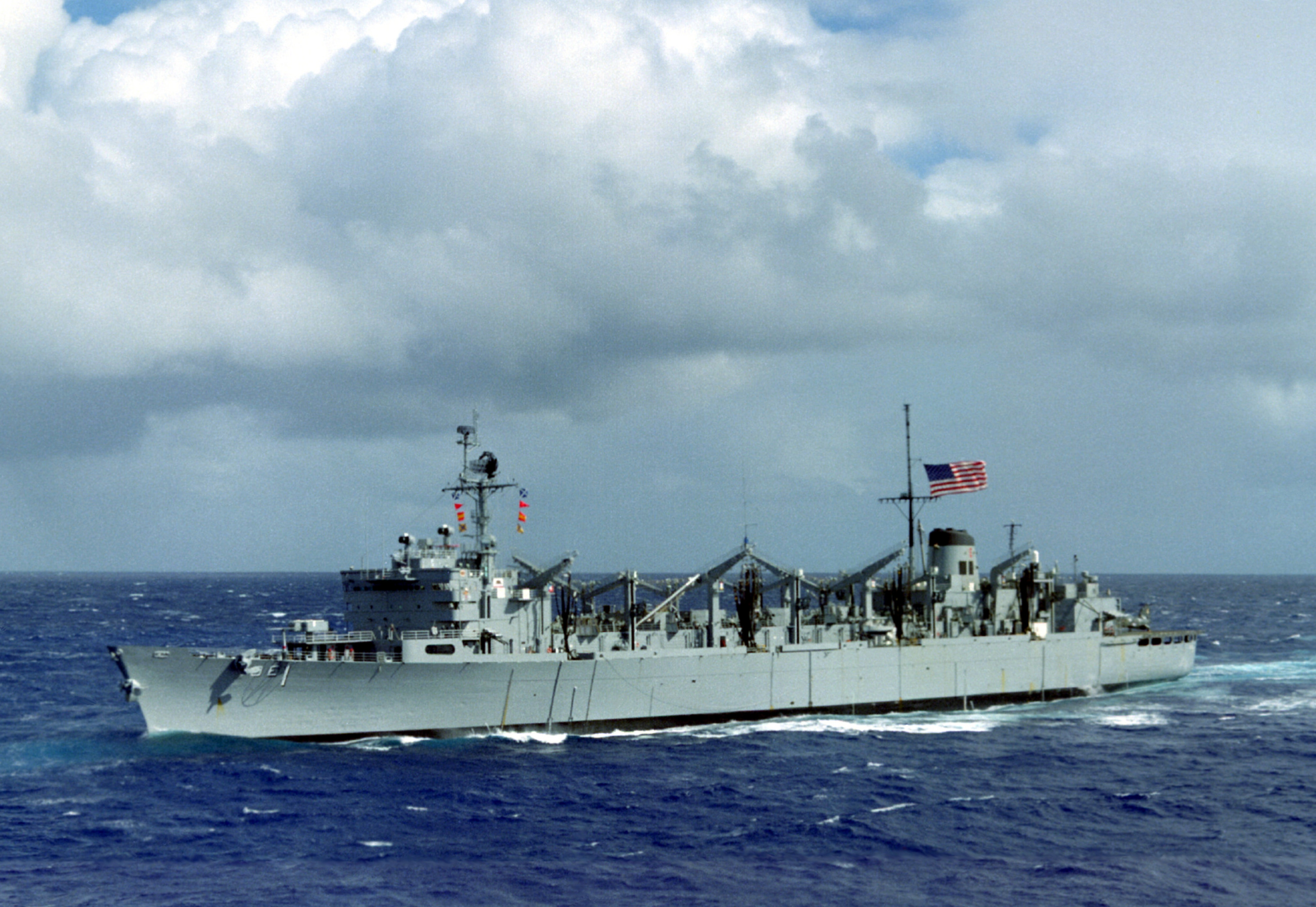
USS Sacramento (AOE-1)

This section of the list of United States Navy ships contains all ships of the United States Navy with names beginning with S.

For a list exclusively of currently commissioned ships, see the List of current ships of the United States Navy.

For ships with unique names, "USS Ship‍name" redirects to the ship article. For reused names, "USS Ship‍name" is an index page for the ships of that name; the links after the name lead to the specific ship pages.

== S ==
- List of sub chasers (SC-1 through SC-1634)
- USS S-1 (SS-105)
- USS S-2 (SS-106)
- USS S-3 (SS-107)
- USS S-4 (SS-109)
- USS S-5 (SS-110)
- USS S-6 (SS-111)
- USS S-7 (SS-112)
- USS S-8 (SS-113)
- USS S-9 (SS-114)
- USS S-10 (SS-115)
- USS S-11 (SS-116)
- USS S-12 (SS-117)
- USS S-13 (SS-118)
- USS S-14 (SS-119)
- USS S-15 (SS-120)
- USS S-16 (SS-121)
- USS S-17 (SS-122)
- USS S-18 (SS-123)
- USS S-19 (SS-124)
- USS S-20 (SS-125)
- USS S-21 (SS-126)
- USS S-22 (SS-127)
- USS S-23 (SS-128)
- USS S-24 (SS-129)
- USS S-25 (SS-130)
- USS S-26 (SS-131)
- USS S-27 (SS-132)
- USS S-28 (SS-133)
- USS S-29 (SS-134)
- USS S-30 (SS-135)
- USS S-31 (SS-136)
- USS S-32 (SS-137)
- USS S-33 (SS-138)
- USS S-34 (SS-139)
- USS S-35 (SS-140)
- USS S-36 (SS-141)
- USS S-37 (SS-142)
- USS S-38 (SS-143)
- USS S-39 (SS-144)
- USS S-40 (SS-145)
- USS S-41 (SS-146)
- USS S-42 (SS-153)
- USS S-43 (SS-154)
- USS S-44 (SS-155)
- USS S-45 (SS-156)
- USS S-46 (SS-157)
- USS S-47 (SS-158)
- USS S-48 (SS-159)
- USS S-49 (SS-160)
- USS S-50 (SS-161)
- USS S-51 (SS-162)
- USS S-132 (1920)
- USS S. M. Goucher (SP-2487)
- USS S. P. Lee (DD-310, T-AGS-31/T-AG-192)
- USS S. T. Co. No. 2 (SP-267)

== Sab–Sam ==
- USS Sabalo (SP-225, SS-302)
- USS Sabatowan (ID-4056)
- USS Sabeata (YTB-287)
- USS Sabik (AK-121)
- USS Sabine (1855, AO-25)
- USS Sabine Sun (ID-2747)
- USS Sable (IX-81)
- USS Sablefish (SS-303/AGSS-303)
- USS Sabot (SP-213)
- USS Sabotawan (ID-4056)
- USS Sac City (ID-3861)
- USS Sacagawea (YT-241, YT-326, T-AKE-2)
- USS Sacandaga (ID-3877, AOG-40)
- USS Saccarappa (ID-3828)
- USS Sachem (1776, 1861, SP-192)
- USS Saco (1863, YT-31, YTB-796)
- USS Sacramento (1862, PG-19, AOE-1)
- HSV Sacrifice (JHSV-9)
- USS Sadie Ross (SP-736)
- USS Saetia (ID-2317)
- USS Safeguard (ARS-25, ARS-50/T-ARS-50)
- USS Saffron (1863)
- USS Sagacity (AM-293, AM-469/MSO-469)
- USS Sagadahoc (ID-3311)
- USS Sagadahoc County (LST-1091)
- USS Sagamore (1861, AT-20/ATO-20, ATA-208)
- USS Sagawamick (YTB-522/YTM-522)
- USS Sage (AM-111/MSF-111)
- USS Saginaw (1859, LST-1188)
- USS Saginaw Bay (CVE-82/CVHE-82)
- USNS Saginaw Ojibwe Anishinabek (T-ATS-8)
- USNS Sagitta (T-AK-87)
- USS Sagittarius (AKN-2)
- USS Sagua (ID-1627)
- USS Saguanash (YTB-288)
- USS Saidor (CVE-117/CVHE-117/AKV-17)
- USS Sailfish (SS-192, SSR-572/SS-572)
- USS Saint Croix (APA-231/LPA-231)
- USS Saint Croix River (LSM(R)-524)
- USS Saint Paul (1895, CA-71, CA-73)
- USS Saipan (CVL-48/AVT-6/CC-3/AGMR-2, LHA-2)
- USS Sakarissa (YT-269/YTB-269/YTM-269)
- USS Sakatonchee (YOG-49/AOG-19)
- USS Sakaweston (YT-289)
- USS Sakonnet (AOG-61)
- USS Salamaua (CVE-96)
- USS Salamonie (AO-26)
- USS Salem (CL-3, CM-11, CA-139)
- USS Salerno Bay (CVE-110/AKV-10)
- USS Salinan (AT-161/ATF-161)
- USS Salinas (AO-19)
- USS Saline County (LST-1101)
- USS Salisbury Sound (AV-13)
- USS Salish (ATA-187)
- USS Sallie Bishop (1864)
- USS Sallie Wood (1860)
- RV Sally Ride (T-AGOR-28)
- USS Salmon (SS-19, SS-182, SSR-573/SS-573/AGSS-573)
- USS Salmon Falls River (LSM(R)-530)
- USS Salt Lake City (CL-25/CA-25, SSN-716)
- USS Saltery Bay (CVE-117)
- USS Saluda (IX-87/YAG-87)
- USS Salute (AM-294/MSF-294, AM-470/MSO-470)
- USS Salvager (ARS(D)-3/YMLC-3)
- USS Salvor (SP-3418, ARS-52/T-ARS-52)
- USS Sam Houston (SSBN-609/SSN-609)
- USS Sam Nunn (DDG-133)
- USS Sam Rayburn (SSBN-635/MTS-635)
- USS Samar (PG-41, ARG-11)
- USS Samarinda (ID-2511)
- USS Samaritan (AH-10)
- USS Samoa (1917, CB-6)
- USS Samoset (YT-5/YTM-5, SP-2000, ATA-190)
- USNS Sampan Hitch (T-AGM-18)
- USS Sample (DE-1048/FF-1048)
- USS Sampson (DD-63, DD-394, DDG-10, DDG-102)
- USS Samson (1861, 1862, 1869)
- USS Samuel B. Roberts (DE-413, DD-823, FFG-58)
- USS Samuel Chase (AP-56/APA-26)
- USS Samuel Eliot Morison (FFG-13)
- USS Samuel Gompers (AD-37)
- USNS Samuel L. Cobb (T-AOT-1123)
- USS Samuel N. Moore (DD-747)
- USS Samuel Rotan (1861)
- USS Samuel S. Miles (DE-183)

== San ==
- USS San Alberto Bay (CVE-116)
- USS San Antonio (LPD-17)
- USS San Bernardino (PG-59, LST-1189)
- USS San Bernardino County (LST-1110)
- USS San Carlos (AVP-51)
- USS San Clemente (AG-79)
- USS San Diego (ACR-6/CA-6, CL-53/CLAA-53, AFS-6/T-AFS-6, LPD-22)
- USS San Felipe (YFB-12, YFB-57, YFB-79)
- USS San Francisco (C-5/CM-2, CA-38, SSN-711, SSN-810)
- USS San Jacinto (1850, CV-30/CVL-30/AVT-5, CG-56)
- USS San Joaquin (1876, AKA-109)
- USS San Joaquin County (LST-1122)
- USS San Jose (AFS-7/T-AFS-7)
- USS San Juan (ID-1352, SP-2262, SP-3306, CL-54/CLAA-54, SSN-751)
- USS San Leandro (YFB-34, YFB-60)
- USS San Marcos (1911, LSD-25)
- USS San Mateo (AF-24)
- USS San Onofre (ARD-30)
- USS San Pablo (AVP-30/AGS-30)
- USS San Pedro (PG-145/PF-37)
- USS San Saba (APA-232)
- USS San Toy II (SP-996)
- USS Sanborn (APA-193)
- USS Sanctuary (AH-17)
- USS Sand Caster (YM-31)
- USS Sand Fly (1823)
- USS Sand Lance (SS-381, SSN-660)
- USS Sanda (YP-3)
- USS Sandalwood (YN-27/AN-32)
- USS Sanderling (AM-37, AMc-11, AM-410, AMS-35/AMCU-49/MHC-49)
- USS Sanders (DE-40, DE-273)
- USS Sandoval (1895, APA-194/LPA-194)
- USS Sandpiper (AM-51/AVP-9, AMCU-38/MHC-38)
- USS Sands (DD-243/APD-13, T-AGOR-6)
- USS Sandusky (1865, PG-162/PF-54)
- USS Sandy Bay (CVE-118)
- USS Sangamon (1862, AO-28/AVG-26/ACV-26/CVE-26)
- USS Sangay (AE-10)
- USS Sanibel (YFB-23)
- USS Sanpoil (YTB-707)
- USS Sans Souci II (SP-301)
- USS Santa Ana (ID-2869)
- USS Santa Barbara (ID-4522, Launch #164, AE-28/T-AE-28, LCS-32)
- USS Santa Cecilia (ID-4008)
- USS Santa Clara (ID-4523)
- USS Santa Elena (ID-4052)
- USS Santa Elisa (ID-4352)
- USS Santa Fe (CL-60, SSN-763)
- USS Santa Leonora (ID-4352-A)
- USS Santa Luisa (ID-2873)
- USS Santa Malta (ID-3125-A)
- USS Santa Olivia (SP-3125)
- USS Santa Paula (ID-1590)
- USS Santa Rita (YFB-681)
- USS Santa Rosa (ID-2169, YFB-33)
- USS Santa Rosalia (ID-1503)
- USS Santa Teresa (ID-3804)
- USS Santaquin (YTB-824)
- USS Santee (1855, 1905, AO-29/AVG-29/ACV-29/CVE-29/CVHE-29)
- USS Santiago (ID-2253)
- USS Santiago de Cuba (1861)

== Sap–Say ==
- USS Sapelo (AO-11)
- USS Sappa Creek (AO-141)
- USS Sapphire (SP-710, PYc-2)
- USS Sappho (SP-1427, AKA-38)
- USS Sara Thompson (ID-3148/AO-8)
- USS Sarah and Caroline (1861)
- USS Sarah Bruen (1862)
- USS Sarah M. Kemp (1861)
- USS Sarah S. B. Carey (1863)
- USS Saranac (1814, 1848, 1899, ID-1702, AO-74/YFP-9)
- USS Sarasota (APA-204/LPA-204)
- USS Saratoga (1780, 1814, 1842, ACR-2, CC-3/CV-3, CVA-60/CV-60)
- USS Sard (PYc-23)
- USS Sarda (SS-488/AGSS-488)
- USS Sardonyx (PYc-12)
- USS Sargent Bay (AVG-83/ACV-83/CVE-83/CVU-83)
- USS Sargo (SS-188, SSN-583)
- USS Sarita (AKA-39)
- USS Sarpedon (ARB-7)
- USS Sarsfield (DD-837)
- USS Sarsi (AT-111/ATF-111)
- USS Sassaba (YT-364/YTB-364/YTM-364)
- USS Sassacus (1862, YT-193/YTB-193/YTM-193)
- USS Satago (YTB-414/YTM-414)
- USS Satanta (YT-270/YTB-270/YTM-270)
- USS Satellite (1854, SP-1012)
- USS Satilla (SP-687)
- USS Satinleaf (YN-62/AN-43)
- USS Satinwood (YN-89/AN-76)
- USS Satsuma (ID-2038)
- USS Satterlee (DD-190, DD-626)
- USS Saturn (AG-4, AK-49/AF-40, T-AFS-10)
- USS Satyr (ARL-23)
- USS Saucy (PG-65)
- USS Saufley (DD-465/DDE-465/EDDE-465)
- USS Saugatuck (AO-75/T-AOT-75)
- USS Saugus (1863, AN-4/AP-109/LSV-4/MCS-4, YTB-780)
- USS Saunter (AM-295)
- USS Saury (SS-189)
- USS Sausalito (PG-112/PF-4)
- USS Savage (DE-386/DER-386)
- USS Savannah (1798, 1842, ID-3015/AS-8, CL-42, AOR-4, LCS-28)
- USS Savo Island (CVE-78/CVHE-78/AKV-28)
- USS Sawfish (SS-276)
- USS Saxis (SP-615)
- USS Sayona II (SP-1109)
- USS Sayonara II (SP-587)

== Sc–Sel ==
- USS Scabbardfish (SS-397)
- USS Scammel (1798)
- USS Scamp (SS-277, SSN-588)
- SS Scan (AK-5018)
- USS Scandinavia (SP-3363)
- USS Scania (AKA-40)
- USS Scanner (YAGR-5/AGR-5)
- USS Scarpe (SP-713)
- USS Scaup (AM-411)
- USS Schenck (DD-159/AG-82)
- USS Schenectady (LST-1185)
- USS Schley (SS-52, DD-99, DD-103/APD-14)
- USS Schmitt (DE-676/APD-76)
- USS Schofield (DEG-3/FFG-3)
- USS Schroeder (DD-501)
- USS Schurz (1894)
- USS Schuyler (AK-209)
- USNS Schuyler Otis Bland (T-AK-277)
- USS Schuylkill (AO-76/T-AO-76/T-AOT-76)
- USS Scindia (1898)
- USS Sciota (1861, AT-30/ATO-30, ATA-205)
- USS Scipio (1882)
- USS Scorpion (1812, 1813, 1847, PY-3, SS-278, SSN-589)
- USS Scoter (SP-20, AM-381/MSF-381)
- USS Scott (DE-214/APD-64, DD-995/DDG-995)
- USS Scourge (1804, 1812, 1846)
- USS Scout (1903, SP-114, AM-296, MCM-8)
- USS Scranton (CA-138, PG-171/PF-63, SSN-756)
- USS Screven (AK-210)
- USS Scribner (DE-689/APD-122)
- USS Scrimmage (AM-297/MSF-297)
- USS Scroggins (DE-799)
- USS Scuffle (AM-298/MSF-298)
- USS Sculpin (SS-191, SS-494, SSN-590)
- USS Sculptor (AK-103)
- USS Scurry (AM-304/MSF-304)
- USS Scylla (1869)
- SDTS (ex-DDG-31)

== Sea ==
- USS Sea Bird (1863)
- USS Sea Cat (SS-399/AGSS-399)
- USS Sea Cliff (DSV-4)
- USS Sea Cloud (IX-99)
- USS Sea Devil (SS-400/AGSS-400, SSN-664)
- USS Sea Dog (SS-401/AGSS-401)
- USS Sea Foam (1861, IX-210)
- USS Sea Fox (SS-402)
- USS Sea Gate (ID-2415)
- USS Sea Gull (1818, 1838, 1902, 1910)
- USS Sea Hawk (1917)
- USS Sea Horse (1812)
- USS Sea Leopard (SS-483)
- USNS Sea Lift (T-LSV-9)
- USS Sea Otter (SP-781)
- USS Sea Otter I (IX-51)
- USS Sea Otter II (IX-53)
- USS Sea Owl (SS-405/AGSS-405)
- USS Sea Panther (SS-528)
- USS Sea Poacher (SS-406/AGSS-406)
- USS Sea Robin (SS-407)
- USS Sea Rover (SP-1014/AT-57)
- USS Sea Scout (PYc-43)
- USS Sea Shadow (IX-529)
- USS Seabrook (YFB-38)
- USS Seadragon (SS-194, SSN-584)
- USS Seagrape (YN-90/AN-77)
- USS Seagull (AM-30/AT-141/ATO-141, AMS-55/MSC(O)-55)
- USS Seahorse (SS-304/AGSS-304, SSN-669)
- USS Seal (SS-19½, SS-183)
- USNS Sealift Antarctic (T-AO-176/T-AOT-176)
- USNS Sealift Arabian Sea (T-AO-169/T-AOT-169)
- USNS Sealift Arctic (T-AO-175/T-AOT-175)
- USNS Sealift Atlantic (T-AO-172/T-AOT-172)
- USNS Sealift Caribbean (T-AO-174/AOT-174)
- USNS Sealift China Sea (T-AO-170/T-AOT-170)
- USNS Sealift Indian Ocean (T-AO-171/T-AOT-171)
- USNS Sealift Mediterranean (T-AO-173/T-AOT-173)
- USNS Sealift Pacific (T-AO-168/T-AOT-168)
- USS Sealion (SS-195, SS-315/ASSP-315/APSS-315/LPSS-315)
- USS Seaman (DD-791)
- USS Searaven (SS-196)
- USS Search (1917)
- USS Searcher (YAGR-4/AGR-4)
- USS Seatag (SP-505)
- USS Seattle (ACR-11/CA-11/IX-39, AOE-3)
- USS Seaward (IX-60, IX-209)
- USS Seaweed (1877)
- USS Seawolf (SS-28, SS-197, SSN-575, SSN-21)
- USNS Seay (T-AKR-302)

== Seb–Sg ==
- USS Sebago (1861, YT-23)
- USS Sebastian (AK-211)
- USS Sebasticook (AOG-72)
- USS Sebec (AO-87/T-AO-87)
- USS Secota (YTB-415/YTM-415)
- USS Secret (SP-1063)
- USS Security (AMc-103)
- USS Sederstrom (DE-31)
- USS Sedgwick (AKA-110)
- USS Sedgwick County (LST-1123)
- USS See W. See (SP-740)
- USS Seekonk (AOG-20)
- USS Seer (AM-112/MSF-112/MMC-5)
- USS Seginus (AK-133)
- USS Segundo (SS-398)
- USS Segwarusa (YT-365/YTB-365/YTM-365)
- USS Seid (DE-256)
- USS Seize (ARS-26)
- USS Selfridge (DD-320, DD-357)
- USS Selinur (AKA-41)
- USS Sellers (DDG-11)
- USS Sellstrom (DE-255/DER-255)
- USS Selma (1856)
- USS Seminole (1859, 1879, AT-65, AKA-104/LKA-104, YT-805)
- USS Semmes (DD-189/AG-24, DDG-18)
- USS Senasqua (YTB-523/YTM-523)
- USS Senator Ross (1798)
- USS Seneca (1861, SP-427, SP-1240, AT-91/ATF-91)
- USS Sennet (SS-408)
- USS Senorita (SS-412)
- USS Sentinel (SP-180, 1918, AM-113, AM-412, AMCU-39/MHC-39)
- USS Sentry (AM-299/MSF-299, MCM-3)
- USS Sepulga (AO-20)
- USS Sequatchie (AOG-21)
- USS Sequin (YFB-35)
- USS Sequoia (1917, AG-23)
- USS Sequoyah (SP-426)
- USS Serapis (1779, 1864, IX-213)
- USS Serene (AM-300/MSF-300)
- USS Seringapatm (1813))
- USS Serpens (AK-97, AK-266)
- USS Serrano (AT-112/ATF-112/AGS-24)
- USS Setauket (YTB-708)
- USS Seven (SP-727)
- USS Seven Seas (IX-68)
- USS Severance (ID-2063)
- USS Severn (1867, 1898, 1918, AO-61)
- USS Sevier (APA-233/LPA-233)
- USS Seymour (DE-98)
- USS Seymour D. Owens (DD-767)
- USNS Sgt. Andrew Miller (T-AK-242)
- USNS Sgt. Archer T. Gammon (T-AK-243)
- USNS Sgt. Charles E. Mower (T-AP-186)
- USNS Sgt. Curtis F. Shoup (T-AG-175)
- USNS Sgt. George D. Keathley (T-APC-117/T-AGS-35)
- USNS Sgt. George Peterson (T-AK-248)
- USNS Sgt. Howard E. Woodford (T-AP-191)
- USNS Sgt. Jack J. Pendleton (T-AK-276/T-AKV-5)
- USNS Sgt. Jonah E. Kelley (T-APC-116)
- USNS Sgt. Joseph E. Muller (T-APC-118/T-AG-171)
- USNS Sgt. Matej Kocak (T-AK-3005)
- USNS Sgt. Morris E. Crain (T-AK-244)
- USNS Sgt. Sylvester Antolak (T-AP-192)
- USNS Sgt. Truman Kimbro (T-AK-254)
- USS Sgt. Truman O. Olson (YMP-2)
- USNS Sgt. William R. Button (T-AK-3012)

== Sh–Sho ==
- USS Shabonee (YT-465, YTB-833)
- USS Shackle (ARS-9)
- USS Shad (SP-551, SS-235)
- USS Shada (SP-580)
- USS Shadow III (SP-102)
- USS Shadwell (LSD-15)
- USS Shady Side (YFB-2079)
- USS Shahaka (YTB-368/YTM-368)
- USS Shahaska (YTB-533/YTM-533)
- USS Shakamaxon (1863, YN-114/AN-88)
- USS Shakori (AT-162/ATF-162)
- USS Shamal (PC-13/WPC-13)
- USS Shamokin (1865, YTB-369, YTM-752)
- USS Shamrock (1863)
- USS Shamrock Bay (ACV-84/CVE-84/CVU-84)
- USS Shangri-La (CV-38)
- USS Shannon (SP-1236, DD-737/DM-25/MMD-25)
- USS Shark (1821, 1861, SS-8, SP-534, SS-174, SS-314, SSN-591)
- USS Sharkey (DD-281)
- USS Sharps (AG-139/AKL-10)
- USS Shasta (AE-6, AE-33)
- USS Shaula (AK-118)
- USS Shaw (DD-68, DD-373)
- USS Shawmut (1863, CM-4, CM-11)
- USS Shawnee (1865)
- USS Shawnee Trail (AO-142/T-AO-142)
- USS Shawsheen (1855)
- USS Shea (DD-750/DM-30/MMD-30)
- USS Shearwater (1887, AM-413, AMCU-40, T-AG-177)
- USS Sheboygan (PG-165/PF-57)
- USS Sheehan (DE-541)
- USS Sheepscot (AOG-24)
- USS Sheffield (YFB-45)
- USS Shelby (APA-105)
- USS Sheldrake (AM-62/AGS-19)
- USS Sheliak (AKA-62)
- USS Shelikof (AVP-52)
- USS Shellbark (YN-91/AN-67)
- USS Shelter (AM-301/MSF-301)
- USS Shelton (DE-407, DD-790)
- USS Shenandoah (1862, YT-36, ZR-1, AD-26, T-AO-181, AD-44)
- USS Shepherd Knapp (1861)
- USS Sherburne (APA-205)
- USS Sheridan (AP-96/APA-51)
- USS Sherman (ID-3345)
- USS Shiel (PG-110)
- USS Shields (DD-596)
- USS Shikellamy (AO-90/AOG-47)
- USS Shiloh (1863, CG-67)
- USS Shiner (SS-404)
- USS Shipley Bay (CVE-85/CVHE-85)
- USS Shippingport (ARDM-4)
- USS Shirin (SP-915)
- USS Shirk (DD-318)
- USS Shokokon (1862)
- USS Short Splice (AK-249)
- USS Shoshone (ID-1760, AKA-65, T-AO-151/T-AOT-151)
- USS Shoup (DDG-86)
- USS Shoveler (AM-382/MSF-382)

== Shr–Si ==
- USS Shreveport (PG-131/PF-23, LPD-12)
- USS Shrewsbury (SP-70)
- USS Shrike (AM-50, MHC-62, AMS-201/MSC-201)
- USS Shrimp (SP-645)
- USS Shubrick (1865, TB-31, DD-268, DD-639)
- USNS Shughart (T-AKR-295)
- USS Shur (SP-782)
- USS Shuttle (SP-3572)
- USS Sialia (SP-543)
- USS Siam Duffey (1919)
- USS Sibley (APA-206)
- USS Siboney (ID-2999, CVE-112/AKV-12)
- USS Sibyl (1863)
- USS Sicard (DD-346/DM-21/AG-100)
- USS Sicily (CVE-118/AKV-18)
- USS Sides (FFG-14)
- USS Sidney C. Jones (1861)
- USS Sidonia (AKA-42)
- USS Sierra (ID-1634, AD-18)
- USS Signal (1862, IX-142)
- USS Signet (AM-302/MSF-302)
- USS Sigourney (DD-81, DD-643)
- USS Sigsbee (DD-502)
- USS Sikis (YTB-539/YTM-539)
- USNS Silas Bent (T-AGS-26)
- USS Silenus (AGP-11)
- USS Silica (IX-151)
- USS Silver Cloud (1862, IX-143)
- USS Silver Lake (1862)
- USS Silverbell (YN-70/AN-51)
- USS Silverleaf (YN-92/AN-68)
- USS Silversides (SS-236/AGSS-236, SSN-679, SSN-807)
- USS Silverstein (DE-534)
- USS Simon Bolivar (SSBN-641)
- USS Simon Lake (AS-33)
- USS Simon Newcomb (AGS-14/AGSC-14)
- USS Simplicity (SP-96)
- USS Simpson (DD-221/AG-97, FFG-56)
- USS Sims (DD-409, DE-154/APD-50)
- USS Sinclair (DD-275)
- USS Sioux (YT-19, ID-1766, AT-75/ATF-75, T-ATF-171)
- USS Sioux City (LCS-11)
- USS Sir Andrew Hammond (1813)
- USS Sirago (SS-485)
- USS Siren (1862, 1897, CMc-1/PY-13)
- USS Sirius (AK-15, AF-60, T-AFS-8)
- USS Sirocco (PC-6)
- USS Sirona (AKA-43)
- USS Siskin (AMS-58/MSC(O)-58)
- USNS Sisler (T-AKR-311)
- USS Sister (SP-822)
- USS Sitka (PF-94, APA-113)
- USS Sitkoh Bay (CVE-86/CVU-86/AKV-30)
- USS Situla (AK-140)
- USS Siwash (SP-12)
- USS Sixaola (ID-2777)

== Sk–Sot ==
- USS Skagit (AKA-105/LKA-105)
- USS Skandawati (YT-370/YTB-370/YTM-370)
- USS Skaneateles (YP-6)
- USS Skate (SS-23, SS-305, SSN-578)
- USS Skenandoa (YT-336, YTB-835)
- USS Skill (AM-115, AM-471/MSO-471)
- USS Skillful (ARS-45)
- USS Skimmer (AMc-53, LCIL-1093, AMCU-41/MHC-41)
- USS Skink (SP-605)
- USS Skipjack (SS-24, SS-184, SSN-585)
- USS Skipper (AMc-104)
- USS Skirmish (AM-303/MSF-303)
- USS Skowhegan (PCE-843/PCE(R)-843)
- USS Skurry (AM-304)
- USS Skylark (AM-63, ASR-20)
- USS Skywatcher (YAGR-3/AGR-3)
- USS Slate (IX-152)
- USS Slater (DE-766)
- USS Sloat (DD-316, DE-245)
- USS Smalley (DD-565)
- USS Smartt (DE-257)
- USS Smith (DD-17, DD-378)
- USS Smith Thompson (DD-212)
- USS Smohalla (YT-371/YTB-371/YTM-371)
- USS Smoky Hill River (LSM(R)-531/LFR-531)
- USS Smyrna River (LSM(R)-532)
- USS Snake River (LSM(R)-533)
- USS Snapper (SS-16, SP-2714, SS-185)
- USS Snark (SP-1291)
- USS Snatch (ARS-27/T-AGOR-18)
- USS Snohomish County (LST-1126)
- USS Snook (SS-279, SSN-592)
- USS Snowbell (YN-71/AN-52)
- USS Snowden (DE-246)
- USS Snowdrop (1863, 1897)
- USS Snyder (DE-745)
- USNS Soderman (T-AKR-299, T-AKR-317)
- USS Soestdijk (ID-3413)
- USNS Sojourner Truth (T-AO-210)
- USS Sol Navis (1919)
- USS Solace (AH-2, AH-5)
- USS Solano County (LST-1128)
- USS Solar (DE-221)
- USS Sole (SS-410)
- USS Soley (DD-707)
- USS Solf (1913)
- USS Solitaire (ID-3026)
- USNS Solomon Atkinson (T-ATS-12)
- USS Solomon Thomas (1863)
- USS Solomons (YFB-23, CVE-67)
- USS Solvay (PC-603)
- USS Somerfield (1861)
- USS Somers (1812, 1842, TB-22, DD-301, DD-381, DD-947/DDG-34)
- USS Somerset (1862, ID-2162, AK-212, PCE-982, LPD-25)
- USS Somersworth (PCE(R)-849/EPCE(R)-849)
- USS Somervell County (LST-1129)
- USS Sonnicant (YTB-416/YTM-416)
- USS Sonoma (1862, AT-12/ATO-12, AT-175/ATA-175)
- USS Sophronia (1861)
- USS Sorrel (1864)
- USS Sotoyomo (YT-9/YTM-9, AT-121/ATA-121)

== Sou–Sp ==
- USS Soubarissen (AO-93/T-AO-93)
- USS South America (1861)
- USS South Bend (ID-4019)
- USS South Carolina (1780, 1798, 1799, 1860, BB-26, DLGN-37/CGN-37)
- USS South Dakota (ACR-9, BB-49, BB-57, SSN-790)
- USS South Pole (ID-3665)
- USS Southampton (1841, AKA-66)
- USS Southard (DD-207/DMS-10)
- USS Southerland (DD-743/DDR-743)
- USNS Southern Cross (T-AK-285)
- USS Southern Seas (PY-32)
- USS Southerner (1861)
- USS Southery (IX-26)
- USS Southfield (1857)
- USS Southland (IX-168)
- USS Southport (1911)
- USCGC Southwind (WAG-280/WAGB-280)
- USS Sovereign (1855, SP-170)
- USS Spadefish (SS-411/AGSS-411, SSN-668)
- USS Spangenberg (DE-223)
- USS Spangler (DE-696)
- MV SP5 Eric C. Gibson (AK-5091)
- USS Spark (1813, 1831, IX-196)
- USS Sparrow (AMc-31, AMCU-42/MHC-42)
- USS Sparrow II (SP-3231)
- USS Spartan (SP-336)
- USS Spartanburg County (LST-1192)
- USS Spear (AM-322/MSF-322)
- USS Spearfish (SS-190)
- USS Spearhead (TSV-X1, T-JHSV-1/T-EPF-1)
- USS Spectacle (AM-305)
- USS Specter (AM-306/MSF-306)
- USS Spector (AM-306)
- USS Speed (AM-116/MSF-116)
- USS Speedway (SP-407)
- USS Speedwell (1865)
- USS Spence (DD-512)
- USS Spencer (1843)
- USS Sperry (AS-12)
- USS Sphinx (ARL-24)
- USS Spica (AK-16, T-AFS-9)
- USS Spicewood (YN-72/AN-53)
- USS Spiegel Grove (LSD-32)
- USS Spikefish (SS-404/AGSS-404)
- USS Spinax (SS-489/SSR-489/AGSS-489)
- USS Spindrift (IX-49)
- USS Spirea (1864)
- USS Spiteful (1862)
- USS Spitfire (1776, 1803, 1814, 1846, 1869)
- USS Splendor (PG-97)
- USS Spokane (CL-120/CLAA-120/AG-191/T-AG-191)
- USS Spoonbill (AMS-202MSC-202)
- USS Spot (SS-413)
- USS Spragge (DE-563)
- USS Spray (ID-2491)
- USS Spray II (SP-308)
- USS Sprig (AM-384/MSF-384)
- USS Springer (SS-414)
- USS Springfield (1862, ID-2575, CL-66/CLG-7/CG-7, SSN-761)
- USS Sproston (DD-173/DM-13, DD-577/DDE-577)
- USS Spruance (DD-963, DDG-111)
- USS Spry (PG-64)
- USS Spuyten Duyvil (1864)

== Sq–Sta ==
- USS Squall (PC-7)
- USS Squalus (SS-192)
- USS Squando (1865)
- USS Squanto (YT-194/YTB-194/YTM-194)
- USS SSG Edward A. Carter Jr. (AK-4544)
- USS St. Andrews (ACV-49/CVE-49)
- USS St. Andrews Bay (CVE-107)
- USS St. Augustine (PG-54)
- USS St. Clair (1862)
- USS St. Clair County (LST-1096)
- USS St. Croix River (LSM(R)-524)
- USS St. Francis (ID-1557, YP-150)
- USS St. Francis River (LSM(R)-525/LFR-525)
- USS St. George (AVG-17/ACV-17/CVE-17, AV-16)
- USS St. Helena (1915, PF-86)
- USS St. Johns (ID-3710)
- USS St. Johns River (LSM(R)-526)
- USS St. Joseph (ACV-50/CVE-50)
- USS St. Joseph Bay (CVE-105)
- USS St. Joseph River (LSM(R)-527)
- USS St. Lawrence (1848)
- USS St. Lo (CVE-63)
- USS St. Louis (1828, 1861, 1894, C-20/CA-18, CL-49, AKA-116/LKA-116, LCS-19)
- USS St. Mary's (1798, 1844, SP-1457, APA-126)
- USS St. Marys River (LSM(R)-528)
- USS St. Mihiel (AP-32)
- USS St. Regis River (LSM(R)-529)
- USS St. Sebastian (SP-470)
- USS St. Simon (ACV-51/CVE-51)
- USS Stack (DD-406)
- USS Stadtfeld (DE-29)
- USS Staff (AM-114/MSF-114)
- USS Stafford (DE-411)
- USS Stag (IX-128/AW-1)
- USS Stagbush (YN-93/AN-69)
- USS Stallion (YT-120/YTM-120, ATA-193)
- USS Stalwart (AMc-105/IX-231, AM-493/MSO-493, T-AGOS-1)
- USS Stamford (PG-203/PF-95)
- USS Standard Arrow (ID-1532)
- USS Standish (1864)
- USS Stanly (DD-478)
- USS Stansbury (DD-180/DMS-8/AG-107)
- USS Stanton (DE-247)
- USS Star (1859)
- USS Star 1 (ID-1351)
- USS Starboard Unit (1918)
- USS Stark (FFG-31)
- USS Stark County (LST-1134)
- USS Starlight (AP-175)
- USS Starling (SP-2981, AM-64/MSF-64)
- USS Starr (AKA-67)
- USS Stars and Stripes (1861)
- USS State of Georgia (1851)
- USS Staten (YFB-36)
- USS Staten Island (WAG-278/WAGB-278/AGB-5)
- USS Staunch (AM-307/MSF-307)
- USS Stayner (DE-564)

== Ste–Stu ==
- USS Steadfast (AFDM-14)
- USS Steady (AM-118/MSF-118)
- USS Steamer Bay (CVE-87/CVHE-87)
- USS Steele (DE-8)
- USS Steelhead (SS-280)
- USS Stein (DE-1065/FF-1065)
- USS Steinaker (DE-452, DD-863/DDR-863)
- USS Stembel (DD-644)
- USS Stentor (ARL-26)
- USS Stephanotis (YP-4)
- USS Stephen Potter (DD-538)
- USS Stephen R. Jones (ID-4526)
- USS Stephen W. Groves (FFG-29)
- USS Stephen W. McKeever (SP-1169)
- USS Stephen Young (1861)
- USS Stepping Stones (1861)
- USS Sterett (DD-27, DD-407, DLG-31/CG-31, DDG-104)
- USS Sterlet (SS-392)
- USS Sterling (1898, IX-201)
- USS Stern (DE-187)
- USS Sterope (AK-96)
- USS Stethem (DDG-63)
- USS Stettin (1862)
- USS Steuben County (LST-1138)
- USS Stevens (DD-86, DD-479)
- USS Stevens' Battery (1862)
- USS Stevenson (DD-503, DD-645)
- USS Stewart (DD-13, DD-224, DE-238)
- USS Stickell (DD-888/DDR-888)
- USS Stickleback (SS-415)
- USS Stiletto (1885)
- USS Stinger (SP-1252)
- USS Stingray (SS-13, SS-186)
- USS Stockdale (1863, DE-399, DDG-106)
- USS Stockham (DE-97, DD-683)
- USS Stockton (TB-32, DD-73, DD-504, DD-646)
- USS Stoddard (DD-566)
- USS Stoddert (DD-302/AG-18)
- USS Stokes (AKA-68)
- USS Stone County (LST-1141)
- USS Stonewall (1863, IX-185)
- USS Stonewall Jackson (SSBN-634)
- USS Storm King (AP-171)
- USS Stormes (DD-780)
- USS Stout (DDG-55)
- USS Strafford County (LST-1142)
- USS Stranger (1880)
- USS Strategy (AM-308/MSF-308)
- USS Stratford (AK-45/AP-41)
- USS Straub (DE-77, DE-181)
- USS Straus (DE-408)
- USS Strength (AM-309/MSF-309)
- USS Stribling (DD-96/DM-1, DD-867)
- USS Strickland (DE-333/DER-333)
- USS Stringham (TB-19, DD-83/APD-6)
- USS Strive (AM-117/MSF-117/MMC-1)
- USS Stromboli (1846)
- USS Strong (DD-467, DD-758)
- MV Strong Virginian (T-AKR-9205)
- USS Stump (DD-978)
- USS Sturdy (SP-82, PYc-50, AM-494/MSO-494)
- USS Sturgeon (SS-25, SS-187, SSN-637)
- USS Sturgeon Bay (IX-27)
- USS Sturtevant (DD-240, DE-239/DER-239)

== Su ==
- USS Suamico (AO-49/T-AO-49)
- USS Sublette County (LST-1144)
- USS Success (1776, AM-310/MSF-310)
- USS Sudbury (ID-2149)
- USS Suffolk (AKA-69)
- USS Suffolk County (LST-1173)
- USS Suisun (AVP-53)
- USS Suitland (YF-336/YDT-15)
- USS Sultana (SP-134)
- USS Sumac (YN-73)
- USS Summit (AMc-106/IX-232)
- USS Summit County (LST-1146)
- USS Sumner (DD-333, AG-32/AGS-5, T-AGS-61)
- USS Sumner County (LST-1148)
- USS Sumpter (1853)
- USS Sumter (AP-97/APA-52, LST-1181)
- USS Sunbeam III (SP-251)
- USS Sunbird (ASR-15)
- USS Suncock (YN-99/AN-80)
- USS Suncook (1865)
- USS Sunfish (SS-281, SSN-649)
- USS Sunflower (1863, 1907)
- USS Sunnadin (AT-28/ATO-28, ATA-197)
- USNS Sunnyvale (T-AGM-5)
- USS Sunset (ACV-48/CVE-48)
- USS Sunset Bay (CVE-106)
- USS Superior (1814, AM-311/MSF-311)
- USS Supply (1846, 1873, IX-147/AVS-1, AOE-6/T-AOE-6)
- USS Support (ARS-46)
- USS Sureste (1899)
- USS Surf (SP-341, SP-518)
- USS Surfbird (AM-383/MSF-383/ADG-383)
- USS Suribachi (AE-21)
- USS Surprise (1777, 1814, 1815, PG-63, PGM-97/PG-97)
- USS Surprize (1777)
- USS Surveyor (1917)
- USS Susan Ann Howard (1863)
- USS Susan B. Anthony (AP-72)
- USS Susanne (SP-411, SP-832)
- USS Susanville (PC-1149)
- USS Susquehanna (1850, ID-3016, AOG-5/T-AOG-5, T-AO-185/T-AOT-185)
- USS Sussex (SP-685, AK-213)
- USS Sustain (AM-119/MSF-119/MMC-2, AFDM-7)
- USS Sutter County (LST-1150)
- USS Sutton (DE-286, DE-771)
- USS Suwanee (1864, 1897, ID-1320)
- USS Suwannee (AO-33/AVG-27/ACV-27/CVE-27/CVHE-27)
- USS Suzanne (SP-510)
- USS Swallow (AM-4, AM-65, AMS-36/MSC(O)-36)
- USS Swan (SP-1437, AM-34/AVP-7, AMS-37/MSC(O)-37)
- USS Swanson (DD-443)
- USS Swasey (DD-273, DE-248)
- USS Swatane (YT-344)
- USS Swatara (1865, 1873)
- USS Sway (AM-120/MSF-120)
- USS Swearer (DE-186)
- USS Sweet Brier (1862)
- USS Sweetwater County (LST-1152)
- USS Swenning (DE-394)
- USS Swerve (AM-121, AM-495/MSO-495)
- USS Swift (1864, AM-122/MSF-122, HSV-2)
- USS Switzerland (1854)
- USS Swivel (ARS-36)
- USS Sword (LSD-14)
- USNS Sword Knot (T-AGM-13)
- USS Swordfish (SS-193, SSN-579)
- USS Sybilla III (SP-104)
- USS Sycamore (YN-28)
- USS Sylph (1813, 1831, PY-5, PY-12)
- USS Sylvan Arrow (ID-2150)
- USS Sylvania (AFS-2, AKA-44)
- USS Sylvia (1882, SP-471)
- USS Symbol (AM-123)
- USS Syncline (YO-63)
- USS Syren (1803)
- USS Syrma (AK-134)
