= USS Spark =

USS Spark may refer to:

- USS Spark (1813), a privateer built in 1813
- USS Spark (1831), purchased by the US Navy in 1831
- USS Spark (IX-196), laid down as LST-340 on 17 July 1942
