= USS Sussex =

USS Sussex is a name used more than once by the U.S. Navy:

- USS Sussex (SP-685), a steamer acquired by the Navy on 5 May 1917.
- USS Sussex (AK-213), a cargo ship commissioned on 27 May 1947.
