= USS Sea Foam =

USS Sea Foam is a name used more than once by the U.S. Navy:

- USS Sea Foam (1861), an American Civil War brig assigned to a mortar flotilla.
- USS Sea Foam (IX-210), commissioned at Pearl Harbor on 15 May 1945.
