= USS Surf =

USS Surf may refer to:

- USS Surf (SP-341), a United States Navy minesweeper in commission from 1917 to 1919
- USS Surf (SP-518), a civilian yacht made available to the United States Navy in 1917 for use as a patrol vessel but never commissioned
