= USS Scout =

USS Scout is a name used more than once by the United States Navy, and may refer to:

- USS Scout (1903), a patrol boat in commission from 1917 to 1919
- USS Scout (SP-114), a patrol boat in commission in 1917
- USS Scout (AM-296), a minesweeper in commission from 1944 to 1947 and from 1951 to 1954.
- USS Scout (MCM-8), a mine countermeasures ship in commission since 1990
