= USS Shearwater =

USS Shearwater is a name used more than once by the United States Navy:

- USS Shearwater (1887), a steel schooner-rigged yacht, built in 1887 by Hawthorne and Co. at Leith, Scotland, and purchased by the Navy on 9 May 1889.
- USS Shearwater (AM-413) was laid down in 1945; however, the conclusion of World War II prompted the cancellation of her construction.

== See also ==
- USNS Shearwater, served with the Military Sea Transportation Service in May 1964. Operated by a Civil Service crew, she operated in the Atlantic Ocean until mid-February 1969, when she was transferred to the United States Army.
