= USS Skimmer =

USS Skimmer is a name used more than once by the United States Navy:

- USS Skimmer (AMc-53), a coastal minesweeper placed in service on 26 August 1941.
- USS Skimmer (LCIL-1093), commissioned on 28 September 1944.
