= USS Sassacus =

USS Sassacus may refer to the following ships of the United States Navy:

- USS Sassacus (1862), a wooden, double-ended sidewheel gunboat of the Sassacus class that served in the American Civil War
- USS Sassacus (YT-193) was a harbor tug launched in 1942
