= USS Swift =

USS Swift is a name used more than once by the United States Navy:

- USS Swift (1864), a schooner captured by the Union Navy and employed as a ship's tender
- USS Swift (AM-122), a minesweeper commissioned on 29 December 1943
- HSV-2 Swift, a mine countermeasures and sea basing test platform ship that was used by the U.S. Navy from 2003 to 2013
