= USS Satellite =

USS Satellite is a name used more than once by the United States Navy:

- USS Satellite (1854), an American Civil War tugboat commissioned at the New York Navy Yard on 12 September 1861.
- USS Satellite (SP-1012), a yacht built during 1887 by John F. Mumm at Brooklyn, New York, was enrolled in the Naval Coast Defense Reserve for service.
