= USS Sierra =

USS Sierra has been the name of more than one United States Navy ship, and may refer to:

- USS Sierra (ID-1634), a troop transport in commission from 1918 to 1919
- USS Sierra (AD-18), a destroyer tender in commission from 1944 to 1994
