= USS Santa Cecilia =

Cargo ship of the United States Navy

History

United States
- Name: USS Santa Cecilia (ID-4008)
- Builder: William Cramp & Sons; Philadelphia, Pennsylvania
- Yard number: 400
- Completed: 1913
- Fate: transferred to U.S. Navy

History

United States
- Name: USS Santa Cecilia (ID-4008)
- Acquired: 10 March 1919
- Commissioned: 10 March 1919
- Decommissioned: 6 October 1919
- Fate: returned to Grace Line, 6 October 1919

General characteristics (as USS Santa Cecilia)
- Class & type: Santa Cecilia-class freighter
- Displacement: 13,500 t
- Length: 420 ft 2 in (128.07 m)
- Beam: 53 ft 9 in (16.38 m)
- Draft: 28 ft 5 in (8.66 m)
- Speed: 13 knots (24 km/h)

USS Santa Cecilia (ID-4008) was the lead ship of her class of freighters of the United States Navy during World War I. In service for the United States Army she was known as USAT Santa Cecilia. Both before and after her World War I service she was known as SS Santa Cecilia for the Grace Line.

== Career ==
SS Santa Cecilia, a single-screw, steel-hulled freighter built during 1913 by William Cramp & Sons Ship and Engine Building Co. of Philadelphia, was chartered by the United States Army during World War I. Santa Cecilia was taken over by the Navy at New York on 10 March 1919; and commissioned the same day.

Santa Cecilia was one of four U.S. Army ships manned by the Navy in March 1919 after conversion to troop transports by the Army. She sailed from Hoboken, New Jersey, on 11 April 1919 for Bordeaux, France, and returned to New York on 9 May with homeward-bound troops. She completed her fourth and last round-trip voyage on 7 September 1919, and was transferred to the United States Shipping Board on 6 October 1919.

Following mercantile service, Santa Cecilia was broken up in 1935.
