= USS Signal =

USS Signal is a name used more than once by the United States Navy, and may refer to:

- USS Signal (1862), an American Civil War gunboat in commission from 1862 to 1864, eventually burned and its crew captured.
- USS Signal (IX-142), a World War II tanker in commission from 1944 to 1946
