= USS Saffron =

Gunboat of the United States Navy

History

United States
- Ordered: as John T. Jenkins
- Laid down: date unknown
- Launched: in 1863 at; New Brunswick, New Jersey
- Acquired: 8 December 1864 at; Perth Amboy, New Jersey
- Commissioned: December 1864
- Decommissioned: at war’s end, 1865
- Stricken: 1865 (est.)
- Fate: Sold, 25 October 1865

General characteristics
- Displacement: 73 tons
- Length: not known
- Beam: not known
- Draught: 8 ft (2.4 m)
- Propulsion: steam engine; screw-propelled
- Speed: 14 knots
- Complement: 16
- Armament: one gun

USS Saffron was a small (73-ton) steamer purchased by the Union Navy during the beginning of the American Civil War.

She served the Union Navy during the blockade of ports and waterways of the Confederate States of America in a variety of ways: as a tugboat, river clearance vessel, and as a minesweeper responsible for clearing "torpedoes" (mines) placed in the water by Confederates.

== Built in New Jersey in 1863 ==
John T. Jenkins, a wooden-hulled screw tug built in 1863 in New Brunswick, New Jersey, was purchased by the Union Navy on 8 December 1864 at Perth Amboy, New Jersey; renamed Saffron; and commissioned within the following week.

== Civil War service ==
=== Assigned to the North Atlantic blockade ===
The tug was assigned to the North Atlantic Blockading Squadron and served at Hampton Roads, Virginia, by 15 December 1864. Saffron operated there and up the James River supporting Union Army forces during the final months of General Ulysses S. Grant's Richmond, Virginia, campaign.

On 3 April 1865, soon after Union forces learned that General Robert E. Lee had evacuated Richmond, Saffron joined a group of other Union ships in clearing obstructions and torpedoes from the channel leading to the fallen city. Their rapid and efficient work enabled President Abraham Lincoln to proceed safely up stream the next day to the newly captured Confederate capital. There, throngs of rejoicing former slaves greeted the President as he walked to the Confederate executive mansion.

After clearing the river to Richmond, Saffron helped to tow a captured Confederate ram, Texas, down stream. The tug then continued to operate in the James River, clearing torpedoes and obstructions from that important waterway, until late in May.

Her squadron's report of 1 June tells that Saffron either had recently sailed or was about to sail north.

== End-of-war deactivation ==
No record of her decommissioning has been found, but the ship was certainly sold at New York City to D. Townsend on 25 October 1865. The tug was redocumented as Clifton on 17 February 1866 and remained in merchant service until she was lost under unknown circumstances in 1885.
