= USS Scarpe =

Patrol vessel of the United States Navy

History

United States
- Name: USS Scarpe
- Namesake: Previous name retained
- Builder: W. S. Burgess, Marblehead, Massachusetts
- Acquired: 1 May 1917
- Commissioned: 1 May 1917
- Fate: Returned to owner 16 May 1919
- Notes: Operated as private motorboat Scarpe until 1917 and from 1919

General characteristics
- Type: Patrol vessel
- Length: 36 ft (11 m)
- Beam: 6 ft 9 in (2.06 m)
- Draft: 2 ft 6 in (0.76 m)
- Speed: 15 miles per hour

USS Scarpe (SP-713) was a United States Navy patrol vessel in commission from 1917 to 1919.

Scarpe was built as a private wooden motorboat of the same name by W. S. Burgess at Marblehead, Massachusetts. On 1 May 1917, her owner, F. F. Fields of Brockton, Massachusetts, loaned her to the U.S. Navy for use as a section patrol boat during World War I. She was commissioned as USS Scarpe (SP-713) the same day.

Assigned to the 1st Naval District in northern New England, Scarpe served on patrol duty for the rest of World War I and for a short time after its conclusion.

Scarpe was returned to Fields on 16 May 1919.
