= USS Spica =

USS Spica is a name used more than once by the United States Navy:

- USS Spica (AK-16), a Sirus-class cargo ship commissioned by the U.S. Navy for service in World War II.
- USNS Spica (T-AFS-9), a Sirius-class combat stores ship laid down, 1 April 1965, at Swan Hunter & Wigham Richardson Ltd., Wallsend-On-Tyne, United Kingdom for the Royal Navy as RFA Tarbatness (A-345) and launched, 1 February 1967.
