= USS Sturdy =

USS Sturdy is a name used more than once by the United States Navy, and may refer to:

- USS Sturdy (SP-82), a patrol craft in commission from 1917 to 1919
- USS Sturdy (PC-460), formerly USS PC-460, later USS Sturdy (PYc-50), a patrol craft in commission from 1940 to 1944
- USS Sturdy (MSO-494), a minesweeper in commission from 1957 to 1972
