= USS Sapphire =

USS Sapphire has been the name of more than one United States Navy ship, and may refer to:

- USS Sapphire (SP-710), a patrol vessel in commission from 1917 to 1918
- USS Sapphire (PYc-2), a patrol yacht in commission from 1941 to 1945
