= USS Speedway =

Patrol vessel of the United States Navy

History

United States
- Name: USS Speedway
- Namesake: Previous name retained
- Builder: Gas Engine & Power Company and Charles L. Seabury Company, Morris Heights, the Bronx, New York
- Acquired: May 2, 1917
- Commissioned: May 3, 1917
- Fate: Returned to owner February 14, 1919
- Notes: Operated as private motorboat Speedway until 1917 and from 1919

General characteristics
- Type: Patrol vessel
- Tonnage: 15 gross register tons
- Length: 52 ft (16 m)
- Beam: 11 ft 3 in (3.43 m)
- Draft: 3 ft (0.91 m) aft
- Speed: 16 miles per hour
- Armament: 1 × 1-pounder gun; 1 × .30-caliber (7.62-mm) machine gun

USS Speedway (SP-407) was a United States Navy patrol vessel in commission from 1917 to 1919.

Speedway was built as a private motorboat of the same name by the Gas Engine & Power Company and the Charles L. Seabury Company at Morris Heights in the Bronx, New York. On May 2, 1917, the U.S. Navy acquired her under a free lease from her owner, W. Blair of New York City, for use as a section patrol boat during World War I. She was commissioned as USS Speedway (SP-407) on May 3.

Speedway served on patrol duties along the Mid-Atlantic coast of the United States through the end of World War I. The Navy returned her to her owner on February 14, 1919.
