= USS San Bernardino =

USS San Bernardino or San Bernardino County may refer to the following ships of the United States Navy:

- USS San Bernardino (PG-59)
- USS San Bernardino County (LST-1110)
- USS San Bernardino (LST-1189)
