= USS Stinger =

Patrol vessel of the United States Navy

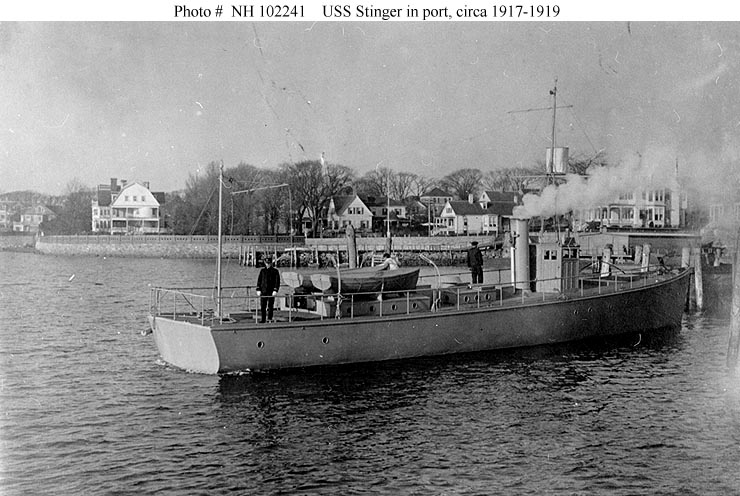
- USS Stinger (SP-1252) backing away from dock ca. 1917.

History

United States
- Name: USS Stinger
- Namesake: Previous name retained
- Builder: Herreshoff Manufacturing Company, Bristol, Rhode Island
- Completed: 1917
- Acquired: 1917
- Commissioned: 11 December 1917
- Stricken: 14 May 1919
- Fate: Transferred to U.S. Department of War 20 November 1919

General characteristics
- Type: Patrol vessel
- Tonnage: 47 Gross register tons
- Length: 80 ft 6 in (24.54 m)
- Beam: 12 ft 5 in (3.78 m)
- Draft: 3 ft 5 in (1.04 m)
- Propulsion: Steam engine
- Speed: 15 knots
- Complement: 17
- Armament: 1 × 1-pounder gun; 1 × machine gun

USS Stinger (SP-1252) was a United States Navy patrol vessel in commission from 1917 to 1919.

Stinger was built in 1917 with the builder's name Herreshoff No. 312 by the Herreshoff Manufacturing Company at Bristol, Rhode Island, as a private steam yacht for R. S. Russell of Boston, Massachusetts. Russell, who renamed her Stinger, had her built to a naval patrol boat design with the intention of making her available to the U.S. Navy in the event of war. Accordingly, the U.S. Navy purchased Stinger from Russell upon her completion in 1917 for use as a section patrol boat during World War I. She was commissioned as USS Stinger (SP-1252) on 11 December 1917.

Assigned to the 1st Naval District in northern New England, Stinger carried out patrol duties for the rest of World War I and until May 1919.

Stinger was stricken from the Navy List on 14 May 1919 and was transferred to the United States Department of War on 20 November 1919.
