= USS Saipan =

Two ships of the United States Navy have been named USS Saipan, after the Battle of Saipan, one of the Northern Mariana Islands that was a scene of heavy fighting in World War II.

- The first USS Saipan (CVL-48) was commissioned as a light aircraft carrier in 1946, converted to the command ship Arlington (AGMR-2) and recommissioned in 1966, serving until 1970.
- The second USS Saipan (LHA-2) was an amphibious assault ship commissioned 1977 and decommissioned 20 April 2007.
