= USS San Marcos =

Two ships of the United States Navy have been named USS San Marcos.

- USS San Marcos (1911), was a battleship commissioned USS Texas in 1895 that saw action in the Spanish–American War, renamed in honor of San Marcos, Texas
- USS San Marcos (LSD-25), was a dock landing ship, named in honor of Castillo de San Marcos, commissioned in 1945 that saw action at the end of World War II and later commissioned into the Spanish Navy as Galicia (TA31).
