= USS S. P. Lee =

USS S. P. Lee may refer to the following ships operated by the United States Navy:

- USS S. P. Lee (DD-310), a Clemson-class destroyer commissioned in 1920 and wrecked in 1923
- USNS S. P. Lee (T-AGS-31), a hydrographic survey ship delivered in 1968 and struck in 1992; transferred to the Mexican Navy in 1992 as Antares (BI-04)
