= USS Shabonee =

USS Shabonee may refer to:

- USS Shabonee (YT-465) was an English-built tugboat acquired by the U.S. Navy in 1943.
- Shabonee (YTB-833) was a tugboat acquired by the U.S. Navy in 1974.
