= USS Sioux (YT-19) =

Tugboat of the United States Navy

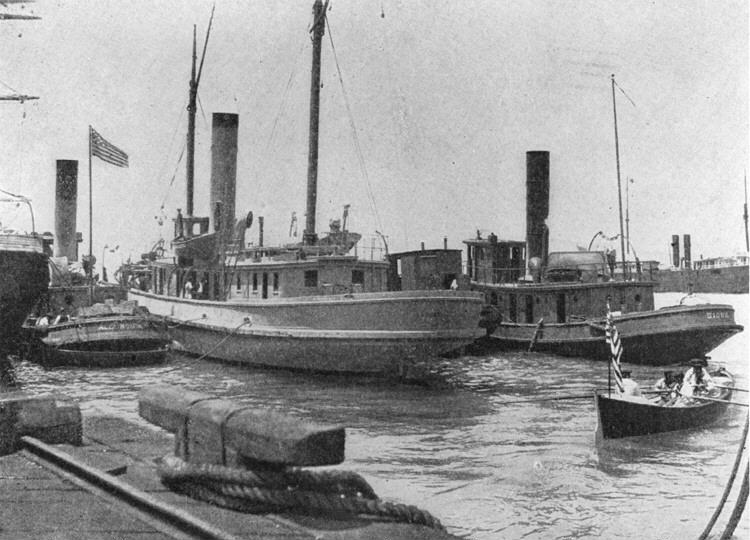
- USS Sioux at left

History

United States
- Name: USS Sioux
- Builder: Neafie & Levy, Philadelphia
- Launched: 1892, as P. H. Wise
- Acquired: by purchase, 25 March 1898
- Renamed: Nyack, 20 February 1918
- Fate: Sold, 18 July 1921

General characteristics
- Type: Tugboat
- Displacement: 155 long tons (157 t)
- Length: 84 ft 6 in (25.76 m)
- Beam: 19 ft (5.8 m)
- Draft: 8 ft (2.4 m)
- Depth of hold: 9 ft (2.7 m)
- Speed: 10 knots (19 km/h; 12 mph)
- Armament: 2 × 1-pounder guns; 1 × machine gun

The first USS Sioux (YT-19) was an iron-hulled tug in the United States Navy. Sioux was named after the Sioux people.

Sioux, was built as P. H. Wise at Philadelphia in 1892 by Neafie & Levy and was purchased by the U.S. Navy on 25 March 1898.

== Spanish–American War assignment ==
Acquired for the impending war with Spain, the tug was assigned to the Atlantic station and operated at the Norfolk Navy Yard. In 1901, she moved north for duty at the Portsmouth Navy Yard in Kittery, Maine; and, in 1907, she was transferred to the Boston Navy Yard. On 18 January 1908 she went ashore on Gull Rocks, Newport, Rhode Island. Refloated and returned to service.

== Decommissioning ==
She was renamed Nyack on 20 February 1918, and she was sold at Boston on 18 July 1921 to William S. Nolan.
