= USS Shad (SP-551) =

Patrol vessel of the United States Navy

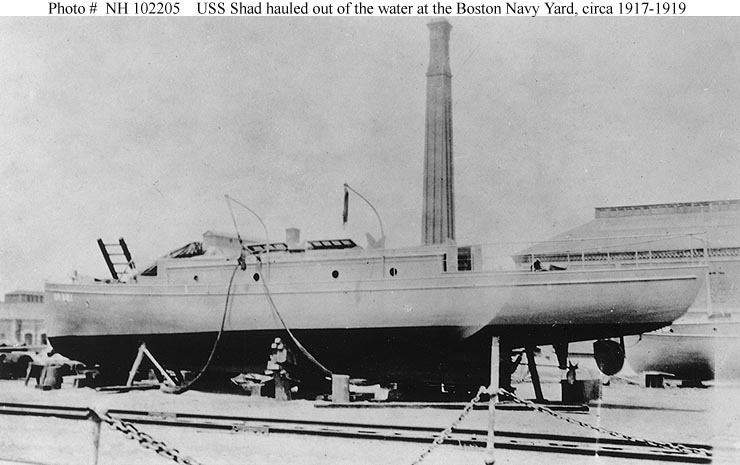
- USS Shad (SP-551) hauled out of the water at the Boston Navy Yard in Boston, Massachusetts, sometime between 1917 and 1919.

History

United States
- Name: USS Shad
- Namesake: Previous name retained
- Builder: George Lawley & Son, Neponset, Massachusetts
- Completed: 1907
- Acquired: 15 May 1917
- Commissioned: 24 May 1917
- Decommissioned: 1919
- Stricken: 18 August 1919
- Fate: Sold 10 September 1919
- Notes: Operated as private motorboat Shad 1907-1917

General characteristics
- Type: Patrol vessel
- Tonnage: 17 gross register tons
- Length: 43 ft 8 in (13.31 m)
- Beam: 10 ft (3.0 m)
- Draft: 3 ft 5 in (1.04 m)
- Speed: 12 knots
- Complement: 8
- Armament: 1 × 1-pounder gun

The first USS Shad (SP-551) was a United States Navy patrol vessel in commission from 1917 to 1919.

Shad was built as a private motorboat of the same name by George Lawley & Son at Neponset, Massachusetts in 1907. On 15 May 1917, the U.S. Navy purchased her from Herbert C. Talbot for use as a section patrol vessel during World War I. She was commissioned as USS Shad (SP-551) on 24 May 1917.

Presumably assigned to the 1st Naval District, Shad served on patrol duties in Boston Harbor at Boston, Massachusetts, for the rest of World War I and during the first few months of 1919.

Shad was decommissioned in 1919, stricken from the Navy List on 18 August 1919, and sold on 10 September 1919 to the J. E. Doherty Company of Boston.
