= USS Seatag =

Patrol vessel of the United States Navy

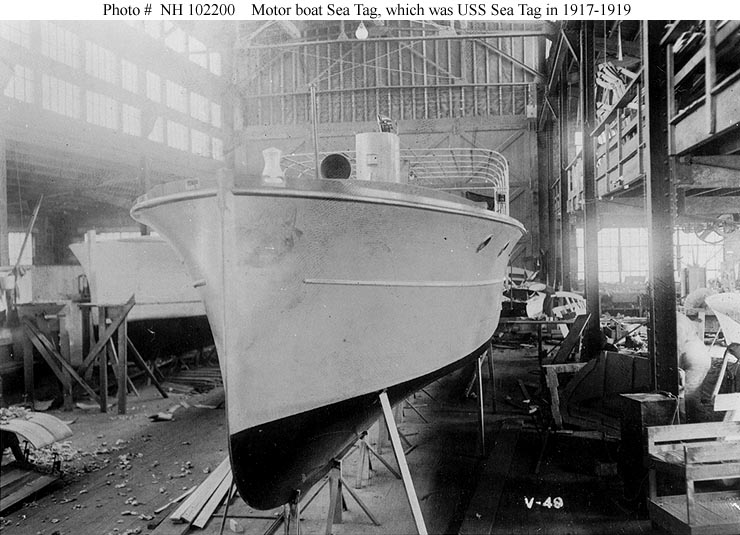
- Seatag as a civilian motorboat, photographed in a boat shed probably around the time of her completion in 1917.

History

United States
- Name: USS Seatag or Sea Tag
- Namesake: Previous name retained
- Builder: Great Lakes Boatbuilding Corporation, Milwaukee, Wisconsin
- Completed: 1917
- Acquired: 9 July 1917
- Commissioned: 1 August 1917
- Decommissioned: 18 November 1918
- Fate: Returned to owner 7 March 1919
- Notes: Operated as private motorboat Seatag or Sea Tag in 1917 and from 1919

General characteristics
- Type: Patrol vessel
- Length: 51 ft (16 m)
- Beam: 10 ft 3 in (3.12 m)
- Draft: 2 ft 5 in (0.74 m)
- Speed: 22 miles per hour
- Complement: 10
- Armament: 1 × 1-pounder gun

USS Seatag (SP-505), also spelled Sea Tag, was a United States Navy patrol vessel in commission from 1917 to 1918.

Seatag was built in 1917 as a private motorboat of the same name by the Great Lakes Boatbuilding Corporation at Milwaukee, Wisconsin. On 9 July 1917, the U.S. Navy acquired her under a free lease from her owner, Donald Ryerson of Chicago, Illinois, for use as a section patrol vessel during World War I. She was commissioned as USS Seatag or Sea Tag (SP-505) on 1 August 1917.

Seatag served on the Great Lakes for the rest of World War I. She served primarily on the Detroit River and St. Clair River patrols until 4 October 1918.

Seatag was decommissioned on 18 November 1918, a week after the end of World War I. She was returned to Ryerson on 7 March 1919.
