= USS San Joaquin =

Cargo ship of the United States Navy

USS San Joaquin (AKA-109) was a Tolland-class attack cargo ship whose keel was laid on 17 August 1945, eleven days after the atomic bombings of Hiroshima and Nagasaki which ended World War II. Further construction was cancelled on 27 August 1945.
