= USS St. Mary's (1798) =

Sloop-of-war of the United States Navy

History

United States
- Name: USS St. Mary's
- Builder: Patterson Yard - St. Marys, GA.
- Laid down: 1797
- Launched: 1797
- Commissioned: 1797
- Decommissioned: 1801
- Fate: Unknown

General characteristics
- Type: galley
- Tons burthen: 530
- Length: 52 ft (16 m)
- Beam: 15 ft (4.6 m)
- Draft: 5 ft 8 in (1.73 m)
- Propulsion: Sail
- Sail plan: Lug/Lanteen
- Complement: 2 officers and 26 enlisted
- Armament: 1 × 24-pounder gun; 5 × brass howitzers

The first USS St. Mary's was a Galley in the United States Navy.

St. Mary's was built in 1797 at the Paterson Yard, St. Marys, GA., was commissioned in 1798. Captain John Braddock was erroneously reported as its commander. However, he had died in 1794.

St. Mary's was built on the St. Mary's River in Georgia in 1798. One of seven galleys constructed and equipped by the Navy for operation under the War Department on coast defense duty during the Quasi-War with France, St. Mary's officers were appointed by the Secretary of the Navy, while the remainder of her crew was composed of local recruits.

== Service history ==
St. Mary's cruised off the Georgia coast from 1798 to 1801 to protect local commerce and coastal settlements from armed French vessels operating in the area.

Able to maneuver under oars in the absence of wind, the galley was ideally suited for the defense of the many inlets and small harbors along the coast of the southern United States. In addition to defending settlements and waterways, her duty was to prevent hostile raids, depredations and to take or destroy any armed French vessels encountered.

She was transferred to the Revenue Cutter Service late in 1801.
