= USS Salute =

Ship name

USS Salute may refer to the following ships of the United States Navy:

- USS Salute (AM-294) was laid down on 11 November 1942 by Winslow Marine Railway and Shipbuilding Co., Seattle, Washington
- USS Salute (AM-470) was laid down on 17 March 1953 by the Luders Marine Construction Co., Stamford, Connecticut
