= USS Scamp =

USS Scamp has been the name of more than one United States Navy ship, and may refer to:

- USS Scamp (SS-277), a submarine commissioned in 1942 and reported missing in 1944
- USS Scamp (SSN-588), a submarine in commission from 1961 to 1988
