= USS Spartan =

Minesweeper of the United States Navy

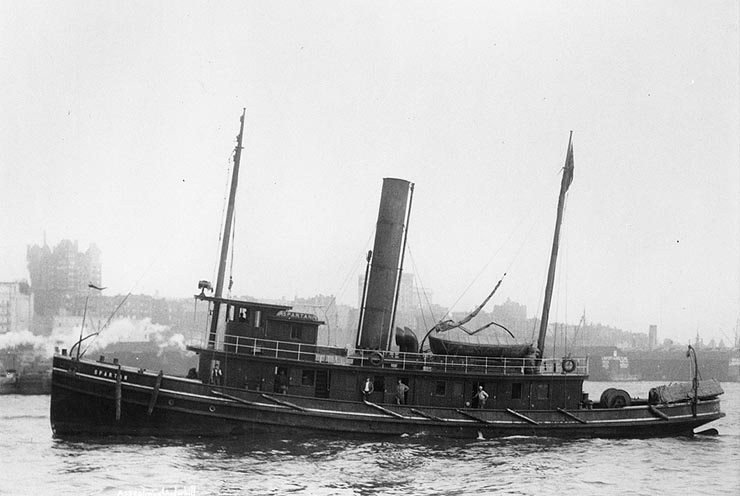
- Spartan as a commercial tug sometime between 1912 and 1917, prior to her service as U.S. Navy minesweeper USS Spartan (SP-336).

History

United States
- Name: USS Spartan
- Namesake: Previous name retained
- Builder: Skinner Shipbuilding and Dry Dock Company, Baltimore, Maryland
- Completed: 1912
- Acquired: 27 April 1917
- Commissioned: 22 September 1917
- Fate: Returned to owner 20 September 1919; hulk still afloat as of February 2008
- Notes: Operated as commercial tug Spartan 1912–1917 and from 1919

General characteristics
- Type: Minesweeper
- Tonnage: 226 gross register tons
- Length: 105 ft 10.8 in (32.278 m)
- Beam: 25 ft 1.2 in (7.650 m)
- Draft: 10 ft (3.0 m) aft
- Speed: 12 miles per hour
- Armament: 2 × 1-pounder guns

USS Spartan (SP-336) was a minesweeper that served in the United States Navy from 1917 to 1919.

Spartan was built as a commercial tug of the same name in 1912 by the Skinner Shipbuilding and Dry Dock Company at Baltimore, Maryland. On 27 April 1917, the U.S. Navy acquired her from her owners, the H. & N.Y. Transportation Company of New York City, for naval use during World War I. She was commissioned as USS Spartan (SP-336) on 22 September 1917.

Assigned to the 3rd Naval District, Spartan spent the next two years on minesweeping duty in the New York City area. On 20 September 1919, she was returned to H. & N.Y. Transportation; her name subsequently was stricken from the Navy List.

As of ca. February 2008, Spartan's hulk was photographed still afloat at Donjon Marine Yard (formally Whitte Brothers Marine Scrap Yard) at Rossville, Staten Island, New York.
