= USS San Toy II =

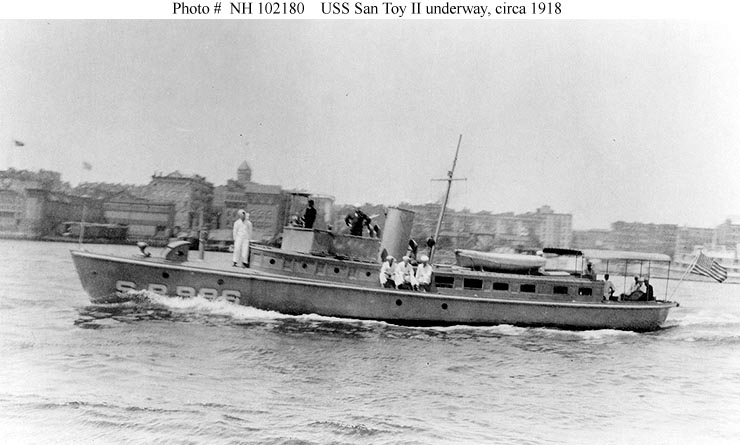
- USS San Toy II (SP-996) ca. summer 1918.

History

United States
- Name: USS San Toy II
- Namesake: Previous name retained
- Builder: Kyle & Purdy, City Island, the Bronx, New York
- Completed: 1910
- Acquired: 3 November 1917
- Commissioned: 3 November 1917
- Stricken: 20 February 1919
- Fate: Returned to owner 20 February or 23 April 1919
- Notes: Operated as private yacht Columbine and San Toy II 1910-1917 and San Toy from 1919 until the 1930s

General characteristics
- Type: Patrol vessel
- Tonnage: 35 Gross register tons
- Length: 70 ft (21 m)
- Beam: 13 ft 3 in (4.04 m)
- Draft: 4 ft 6 in (1.37 m)
- Depth: 6 ft 6 in (1.98 m)
- Speed: 15 knots
- Complement: 6

USS San Toy II (SP-996) was a United States Navy ship's tender and ferry in commission from 1917 to 1919.

San Toy II was built as the private wooden motor yacht Columbine in 1910 by Kyle & Purdy at City Island in the Bronx, New York. She later was renamed San Toy II.

On 30 October 1917, San Toy II was enrolled in the Naval Coast Defense Reserve, and her owner, Charles F. Gauthier, delivered to the U.S. Navy on 3 November 1917 for use during World War I. Assigned the section patrol number 996, she was commissioned as USS San Toy II (SP-996) on the day of her delivery.

Assigned to the 3rd Naval District, San Toy II served initially as tender to the receiving ship in the New York Navy Yard in Brooklyn, New York. She later became a ferry, connecting the New York Navy Yard with Ellis Island in New York Harbor for the rest of World War I.

San Toy II was stricken from the Navy List on 20 February 1919. She either was returned to Gauthier the same day or was ordered returned to him on 23 April 1919. Once again in private use, she remained on yacht registers into the 1930s.
