= USS Snowdrop =

USS Snowdrop has been the name of two ships in the United States Navy.

- USS Snowdrop (1863), originally named A. DeGroat, was a screw tug built in 1863.
- USS Snowdrop (1897), was a member of the United States Lighthouse Service until it was incorporated into the Navy in 1917.
