= USS Sea Otter =

USS Sea Otter may refer to various United States Navy ships:

- USS Sea Otter (SP-781), a patrol vessel in commission from 1917 to 1919;
- USS Sea Otter I (IX-51), an experimental auxiliary ship in commission from July to November 1941; and
- USS Sea Otter II (IX-53), an experimental auxiliary ship in commission from 1941 to 1942.
