= USS Sentinel (1918) =

American World War One patrol vessel

History

United States
- Name: Sentinel
- Laid down: 1918
- Launched: 1918
- Completed: 17 June 1918
- Decommissioned: 28 August 1919
- Fate: Returned to the Coast Guard, 28 August 1919

General characteristics
- Length: 45 ft (14 m)
- Beam: 11 ft 6 in (3.51 m)
- Draft: 4 ft (1.2 m)

The second USS Sentinel, a motorboat built in 1918 by Richardson Boat Co., North Tonawanda, New York, for the United States Coast Guard, was completed on 17 June 1918 and assigned to St. Mary's River patrol, Sault Ste. Marie, Michigan.

== Mission completion ==
Returned to the United States Coast Guard when the services were separated on 28 August 1919, Sentinel served until 1935, being renamed AB-13 in 1923.
