= USS Shirin =

Patrol vessel of the United States Navy

History

United States
- Name: USS Shirin
- Namesake: Previous name retained
- Builder: Gas Engine and Power Company, Morris Heights, the Bronx, New York
- Completed: 1896
- Acquired: 23 May 1917
- Commissioned: 2 June 1917
- Decommissioned: 18 December 1918
- Fate: Sold 29 June 1921
- Notes: Operated as private motorboat Shirin 1896-1917

General characteristics
- Type: Patrol vessel
- Tonnage: 59 Gross register tons
- Length: 110 ft (34 m)
- Beam: 15 ft (4.6 m)
- Draft: 4 ft (1.2 m)
- Speed: 13.5 knots
- Complement: 9
- Armament: 2 × 3-pounder guns; 2 × machine guns

USS Shirin (SP-915) was a United States Navy patrol vessel in commission from 1917 to 1918.

Shirin was built as a private motorboat of the same name in 1896 by the Gas Engine and Power Company at Morris Heights in the Bronx, New York. On 23 May 1917, the U.S. Navy acquired her from her owner, S. T. Rhea Jr., of New Orleans, Louisiana, for use as a section patrol boat during World War I. She was commissioned as USS Shirin (SP-915) on 2 June 1917.

Shirin patrolled at New Orleans and in the vicinity of Pensacola, Florida, for the rest of World War I.

Shirin was decommissioned at New Orleans on 18 December 1918. She was sold on 29 June 1921 to Stewart McDonald of St. Louis, Missouri.
