= USS Sand Lance =

Two submarines of the United States Navy have been named USS Sand Lance for the sand lance.

- The first USS Sand Lance (SS-381), a Balao-class submarine, served during World War II, then was loaned to Brazil, becoming Brazilian submarine Rio Grande do Sul (S-11).
- The second USS Sand Lance (SSN-660), a Sturgeon-class submarine, commissioned 1971, decommissioned 1998.
