= USS Salmon =

USS Salmon has been the name of more than one United States Navy ship, and may refer to:

- USS Salmon (SS-19), a submarine in commission from 1910 to 1922, renamed USS D-3 (SS-19) in 1911
- USS Salmon (SS-182), a submarine in commission from 1938 to 1945
- USS Salmon (SSR-573), later SS-573, then AGSS-573, then again SS-573, a submarine in commission from 1956 to 1977
