= USS Seaweed =

Tugboat of the US Navy

USS Seaweed was a 26-ton screw-driven tugboat of the United States Navy. She operated as a yard tug at Port Royal, South Carolina, between 1877 and 1884.
