= USS Sproston =

USS Sproston was the name of two destroyers of the United States Navy. Both ships were named for Lieutenant John G. Sproston, an officer of the US Navy during the American Civil War.

- USS Sproston (DD-173), a Wickes-class destroyer in service from 1919 to 1922
- USS Sproston (DD-577), a Fletcher-class destroyer in service from 1943 to 1968
