= USS Sitka =

Ship name

USS Sitka has been the name of more than one United States Navy ship, and may refer to:

- USS Sitka (PF-94), a patrol frigate renamed USS Milledgeville (PF-94) in 1944 while under construction
- USS Sitka (APA-113), an attack transport in commission from 1945 to 1946
