= USS Swerve =

USS Swerve may refer to the following ships of the United States Navy:

- USS Swerve (AM-121), laid down on 27 May 1942 by John H. Mathis & Company, Camden, New Jersey
- USS Swerve (MSO-495) (formerly AM-495), laid down on 20 December 1954 by Broward Marine Inc., Fort Lauderdale, Florida
