= USS Sadie Ross =

Patrol vessel of the United States Navy

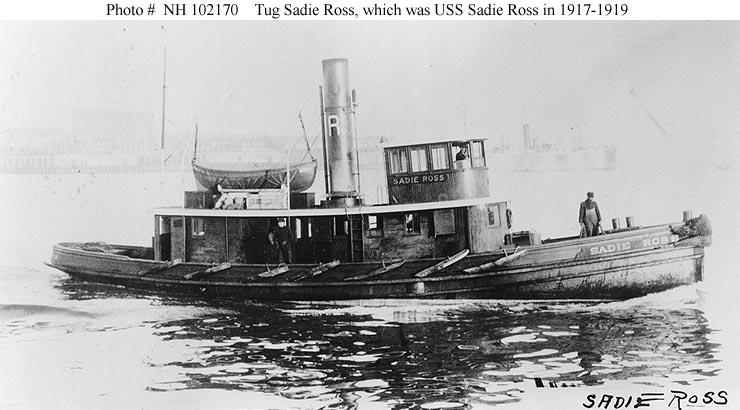
- Sadie Ross as a commercial tug sometime between 1904 and 1917.

History

United States
- Name: USS Sadie Ross
- Namesake: Previous name retained
- Builder: Atlantic Works, East Boston, Massachusetts
- Completed: 1904
- Acquired: 17 May or 2 June 1917
- Commissioned: 7 June 1917
- Fate: Sold 6 August 1920
- Notes: Operated as commercial tug Sadie Ross 1904-1917

General characteristics
- Type: Patrol vessel
- Tonnage: 49 Gross register tons
- Length: 60 ft 6 in (18.44 m)
- Beam: 18 ft 7 in (5.66 m)
- Draft: 7 ft 7 in (2.31 m)
- Speed: 9.5 knots
- Complement: 10
- Armament: 2 × 1-pounder guns; 1 × machine gun

USS Sadie Ross (SP-736) was a United States Navy patrol vessel in commission from 1917 to 1920.

Sadie Ross was built in 1904 as a commercial tug of the same name by the Atlantic Works at East Boston, Massachusetts. On 17 May or 2 June 1917, the U.S. Navy acquired her from Rosstown Boat for use as a section patrol boat during World War I. She was commissioned as USS Sadie Ross (SP-736) on 7 June 1917.

Assigned to the 1st Naval District in northern New England, Sadie Ross performed patrol duty for the rest of World War I.

Sadie Ross was sold on 6 August 1920.
