= USS Shark (SP-534) =

Patrol vessel of the United States Navy

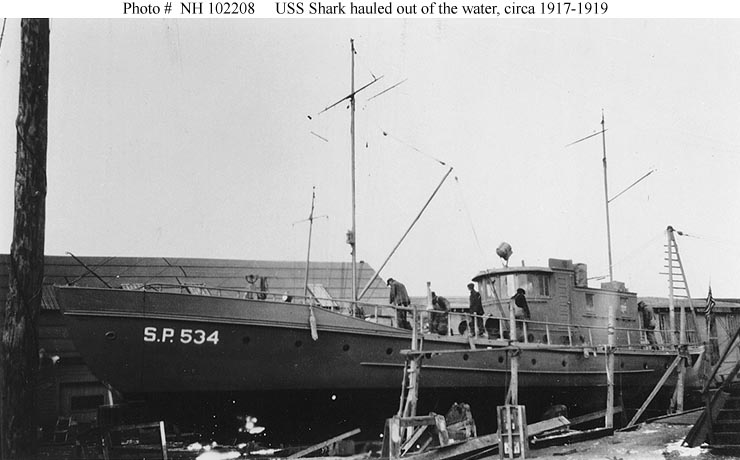
- USS Shark while hauled out of the water sometime between 1917 and 1919.

History

United States
- Name: USS Shark
- Namesake: The shark (previous name retained)
- Completed: 1909
- Acquired: 17 May 1917
- Commissioned: 24 May 1917
- Stricken: 16 September 1919
- Fate: Sold 20 October 1919
- Notes: Operated as civilian motorboat Ildico IV and Shark 1909-1917

General characteristics
- Type: Patrol vessel
- Tonnage: 30 tons
- Length: 74 ft 4 in (22.66 m)
- Beam: 12 ft 5 in (3.78 m)
- Draft: 4 ft 2 in (1.27 m)
- Speed: 12 knots
- Complement: 12
- Armament: 1 × 1-pounder gun; 1 × machine gun

The fourth USS Shark (SP-534) was a United States Navy patrol vessel in commission from 1917 to 1919.

Shark was built as the civilian motorboat Ildico IV in 1909 at South Yarmouth, Massachusetts. She later was renamed Shark. The U.S. Navy purchased Shark from her owner, Louis Herzog of New York City, on 17 May 1917 for World War I service as a patrol vessel. She was commissioned on 24 May 1917 as USS Shark (SP-534).

Assigned to section patrol duty in the 1st Naval District in northern New England, Shark conducted harbor patrols there for the rest of World War I and for a few months after the end of the war.

Shark was stricken from the Navy List on 16 September 1919 and sold to Morgan Barnes on 20 October 1919.
