= USS Shasta =

USS Shasta refers to two ammunition ships of the U.S. Navy:

- USS Shasta (AE-6), commissioned in 1942 and decommissioned in 1969
- USS Shasta (AE-33), later USNS Shasta (T-AE-33), commissioned in 1972, decommissioned in 1997 and transferred to the Military Sealift Command
