= USS Scourge =

Three ships of the United States Navy have borne the name USS Scourge:

- USS Scourge (1804), was a former French privateer which the British Royal Navy captured and took into service as HMS Transfer, and in 1802 sold to the consul of Ottoman Tripolitania. The U.S. Navy captured her in 1804 and renamed her Scourge; she was declared unfit for service in 1812 and sold.
- USS Scourge (1812), was the Canadian schooner Lord Nelson, seized for the US Navy on Lake Ontario in 1812, and that sank in 1813
- USS Scourge (1846), was a steamer, purchased in 1846 for service in the Mexican–American War and sold in 1848.
