= USS Sedgwick =

Cargo ship of the United States Navy

USS Sedgwick (AKA-110) was an Andromeda class attack cargo ship whose construction was cancelled due to the end of World War II. Her name was assigned on 26 April 1945, but her construction was cancelled on 27 August 1945, before her keel was laid.
