= USS Sorrel =

Tugboat of the United States Navy

History

United States
- Acquired: 1 August 1864 at Philadelphia
- In service: c. 1864
- Out of service: late 1870s
- Fate: Sold, 27 September 1883

General characteristics
- Displacement: 68 tons
- Length: 77 ft (23 m)
- Beam: 16 ft 6 in (5.03 m)
- Depth of hold: 6 ft 6 in (1.98 m)
- Propulsion: steam engine

USS Sorrel was a small 68-ton steamer purchased by the Union Navy towards the end of the American Civil War.

The Navy placed Sorrel in service as a Philadelphia tugboat, a role she maintained through the end of the Civil War and for a short period afterwards.

== Service history ==
W. S. Hancock—a wooden-hulled steam tug—was purchased by the Navy at Philadelphia on 1 August 1864 from Hillman and Streaker. The small steamer was renamed Sorrel and was apparently served as a general purpose tug at the Philadelphia Navy Yard throughout her naval career. She was laid up in Philadelphia in the late 1870s and remained inactive until she was sold there to A. Purvis & Son on 27 September 1883.
