= USS Shrimp =

Patrol vessel of the United States Navy

History

United States
- Name: USS Shrimp
- Namesake: Previous name retained
- Builder: Gas Engine and Power Company, Morris Heights, the Bronx, New York
- Completed: 1912
- Acquired: 14 May 1917
- Commissioned: 21 August 1917
- Decommissioned: 30 November 1918
- Fate: Returned to owner 25 February 1919
- Notes: Operated as private motorboat Shrimp 1912–1917 and from 1919

General characteristics
- Type: Patrol vessel
- Length: 35 ft (11 m)
- Beam: 9 ft 6 in (2.90 m)
- Complement: 15
- Armament: 1 × machine gun

USS Shrimp (SP-645) was a United States Navy patrol vessel in commission from 1917 to 1918.

Shrimp was built as a private motorboat of the same name by the Gas Engine and Power Company at Morris Heights in the Bronx, New York, in 1912. On 14 May 1917, the U.S. Navy acquired her from her owner, H. W. D. Rudd of Boston, Massachusetts, for use as a section patrol boat during World War I. She was commissioned as USS Shrimp (SP-645) on 21 August 1917.

Shrimp was assigned to harbor patrol duty in Boston Harbor and local escort duty in the Boston area. Although twice reported lost at sea and once nearly destroyed by fire, Shrimp survived her misadventures and remained in service. She eventually was reassigned to night patrol duty at the Fore River Shipyard in Quincy, Massachusetts, but soon was recalled for further harbor patrol duty in Boston Harbor.

Shrimp was decommissioned on 30 November 1918 and returned to Rudd on 25 February 1919.
