= USS Southland =

History

United States
- Builder: Newport News Shipbuilding and Drydock Company
- Laid down: 1908
- Acquired: 1944
- Commissioned: 22 May 1944
- Decommissioned: 24 July 1945
- Stricken: 13 August 1945
- Fate: War Shipping Administration 24 July 1945

General characteristics
- Class & type: Southland
- Displacement: 2,081 Tons
- Length: 301 ft (92 m)
- Beam: 52 ft 10 in (16.10 m)
- Draft: 17 ft 9 in (5.41 m)
- Speed: 15 knots
- Armament: 1 × 12-pounder

The USS Southland (IX-168) was built in 1908 at Newport News, Virginia, by the Newport News Shipbuilding and Drydock Company as the SS Southland. The small steamer operated for the Norfolk and Washington Steamboat Company on the Potomac River and Chesapeake Bay, transporting passengers and freight between Washington, Alexandria, Old Point Comfort, and Norfolk.

Southland was one of several light-draft, inland-water, steamers acquired by the War Shipping Administration (WSA) in 1942 for transfer to the British Ministry of War Transport. She was returned to representatives of WSA in England the following year. After conversion to accommodate 544 passengers by Thorn Tanahill and Sons in Glasgow, Scotland, she was chartered by the United States Navy, on a bare boat basis, and commissioned on 22 May 1944.

Southland was assigned to the 12th Fleet, formerly the United States Naval Forces in Europe, until early 1945. Since there was doubt that she was capable of crossing the Atlantic safely, she was returned to WSA at Falmouth, England, on 24 July 1945. She was decommissioned the same day and struck from the Navy list on 13 August 1945.

Southland was sold subsequently to the Fu Chung International Corporation in China and operated as the Hung Yung until scrapped in 1955.
