= USS Sanderling =

USS Sanderling is a name the United States Navy has used more than once in naming its vessels:

- USS Sanderling (AM-37), a minesweeper commissioned in 1918, decommissioned 1922.
- USS Sanderling (AMc-11), a minesweeper placed in service in 1941, disposed of in 1944.
- USS Sanderling, intended to be minesweeper AM-410, but the contract for her construction was cancelled in 1945.
- USS Sanderling (AMCU-49), a minesweeper, commissioned 1944, decommissioned 1957.
