= USS Sailfish =

USS Sailfish has been the name of more than one United States Navy ship, and may refer to:

- USS Sailfish (SS-192), a submarine in commission from 1940 to 1945
  - Originally named USS Squalus, she sank during test dives in 1939 with the loss of 26 lives
- USS Sailfish (SSR-572), later SS-572, a submarine in commission from 1956 to 1978
