= Sabot (SP-213) =

Patrol vessel of the United States Navy

History

United States
- Name: USS Sabot (proposed)
- Namesake: Sabot, also known as a clog, a shoe shaped from a single piece of wood, worn by European peasants (previous name retained)
- Builder: Great Lakes Boat Company, Milwaukee, Wisconsin
- Acquired: 8 June 1917
- Commissioned: Never
- In service: Never
- Stricken: 17 September 1917
- Fate: Returned to owner 17 September 1917

General characteristics
- Type: Patrol vessel (proposed)
- Length: 48 ft (15 m)
- Beam: 11 ft 2 in (3.40 m)
- Draft: 3 ft (0.91 m)
- Speed: 20 knots
- Complement: 6
- Armament: 1 × 1-pounder gun; 1 × machine gun

USS Sabot (SP-213) was the proposed name and designation of a motorboat the United States Navy acquired for service as a patrol vessel in World War I but never commissioned or otherwise placed in service.

Sabot was built as a civilian motorboat of the same name by the Great Lakes Boat Company at Milwaukee, Wisconsin, and was owned by Mr. M. T. Clark of Winnetka, Illinois. The Navy took possession of her on 8 June 1917 for use on section patrol during World War I and assigned her the section patrol boat number SP-213 but never placed her in service.

Sabot was returned to her owner and stricken from the Navy List on 17 September 1917.
