= USS Sturtevant =

Two ships in the United States Navy have been named USS Sturtevant for Albert D. Sturtevant.

- The first USS Sturtevant (DD-240) was a Clemson-class destroyer, commissioned in 1920 and sunk by allied mines in April 1942.
- The second USS Sturtevant (DE-239) was an Edsall-class destroyer escort, commissioned in 1943 and decommissioned in 1960.
