= USS Spindrift =

History

United States
- Name: USS Spindrift
- Builder: F. F. Pendleton, Wiscasset, Maine
- Launched: 1928
- Acquired: 26 October 1941
- Decommissioned: January 1947
- Stricken: 22 December 1952

General characteristics
- Type: Cutter
- Length: 54 ft 9 in (16.69 m)
- Beam: 12 ft 5 in (3.78 m)
- Draft: 7 ft 3 in (2.21 m)

USS Spindrift (IX-49) was built in 1928 by F. F. Pendleton, Wiscasset, Maine. The auxiliary cutter was acquired by the United States Navy on 26 October 1941 and assigned to the Severn River Naval Command for duty with the United States Naval Academy.

Spindrift supported midshipman training at the academy until being placed in reserve in January 1947. She was struck from the Navy List on 22 December 1952.
