= USS Sparrow II =

Patrol vessel of the United States Navy

History

United States
- Name: USS Sparrow II
- Namesake: Previous name retained
- Builder: Charles Rhode & Sons Company, Baltimore, Maryland
- Completed: 1915
- Acquired: mid-September 1918
- Commissioned: 25 September 1918
- Fate: Sold 30 June 1919
- Notes: Operated as civilian motorboat Sparrow II 1915-1918

General characteristics
- Type: Patrol vessel
- Tonnage: 17.83 Gross register tons
- Length: 51 ft 0 in (15.54 m)
- Beam: 14 ft 0 in (4.27 m)
- Draft: 2 ft 6 in (0.76 m)
- Speed: 7.9 knots

USS Sparrow II (SP-3231) was a United States Navy patrol vessel in commission from 1918 to 1919.

Sparrow II was built as a civilian motorboat of the same name in 1915 by the Charles Rhode & Sons Company at Baltimore, Maryland. In mid-September 1918, the U.S. Navy acquired her from her owner, the Sparrows Point Steel Company of Baltimore, for use as a section patrol boat during World War I. She was commissioned as USS Sparrow II (SP-3231) on 25 September 1918.

Assigned to the 5th Naval District, Sparrow II patrolled the coasts of Maryland and Virginia for the rest of World War I and into 1919.

Sparrow II was sold to J. G. Samp of Baltimore on 30 June 1919.
