= USS S. T. Co. No. 2 =

Minesweeper of the United States Navy

History

United States
- Name: USS S. T. Co. No. 2
- Namesake: Previous name retained
- Builder: Charles Hillman, Philadelphia, Pennsylvania
- Completed: 1898
- Acquired: 24 September 1917
- Commissioned: 27 September 1917
- Fate: Returned to owner 23 June 1919
- Notes: Operated as commercial tug S. T. Co. No. 2 1898-1917 and from 1919

General characteristics
- Type: Tug, dispatch boat, and Minesweeper
- Displacement: 157 tons
- Length: 101 ft 0 in (30.78 m)
- Beam: 22 ft 0 in (6.71 m)
- Draft: 10 ft 5 in (3.18 m) (mean)
- Propulsion: Steam engine
- Speed: 10 knots
- Complement: 13
- Armament: 2 × 1-pounder guns

USS S. T. Co. No. 2 (SP-267) was a United States Navy tug, dispatch boat, and minesweeper in commission from 1917 to 1919.

S. T. Co. No. 2 was built as a commercial steam screw tug of the same name in 1898 by Charles Hillman at Philadelphia, Pennsylvania. The U.S. Navy acquired her under charter from her owner, the Standard Transportation Company, on 24 September 1917 for World War I service. She was commissioned on 27 September 1917 as USS S. T. Co. No. 2 (SP-267).

Assigned to the 5th Naval District, S. T. Co. No. 2 operated in the Virginia Capes area and Chesapeake Bay for the remainder of World War I, serving as a tug, dispatch vessel, and minesweeper.

After the war, S. T. Co. No. 2 was returned to Standard Transportation on 23 June 1919.
