= USS Sandpiper =

Two ships of the United States Navy have been named USS Sandpiper, after the sandpiper, a shore bird related to the plovers and snipes.

- USS Sandpiper (AM-51) laid down on 15 November 1918 at the Philadelphia Navy Yard.
- USS Sandpiper (MHC-38) laid down as LCI(L)-1008 on 29 April 1944 by the Consolidated Steel Corp., Orange, Texas.
