= USS Swatara =

USS Swatara may refer to:

- USS Swatara (1865) was a wooden, screw sloop, launched in 1865 and dismantled in 1872 to become the second ship of this name
- USS Swatara (1873) was a screw sloop, launched in 1873 and decommissioned in 1891
