= USS Sans Souci II =

Patrol vessel of the United States Navy

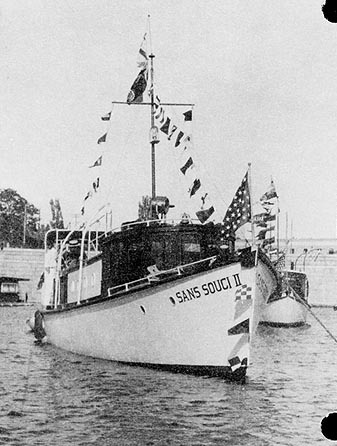
- Sans Souci II in private use sometime between 1907 and 1917, prior to her U.S. Navy service.

History

United States
- Name: USS Sans Souci II
- Namesake: Previous name retained
- Builder: Frank Tregoning, Seattle, Washington
- Completed: 1907
- Acquired: 9 July 1917
- Commissioned: 1 August 1917
- Decommissioned: 7 February 1919
- Stricken: 7 February 1919
- Fate: Returned to owner 26 March 1919
- Notes: Operated as civilian motorboat Sans Souci II 1907-1917 and from 1919 until the early 1930s

General characteristics
- Type: Patrol vessel
- Tonnage: 8 tons
- Length: 50 ft (15 m)
- Beam: 9 ft 6 in (2.90 m)
- Draft: 4 ft (1.2 m)
- Speed: 8 knots
- Complement: 7
- Armament: 2 × 1-pounder gun; 1 × machine gun

USS Sans Souci II (SP-301) was an armed motorboat that served in the United States Navy as a patrol vessel from 1917 to 1919.

Sans Souci II was built as a civilian motorboat of the same name in 1907 by the shipyard of Frank Tregoning at Seattle, Washington. Following the entry of the United States into World War I, she was enrolled in the Naval Coast Defense Reserve on 15 June 1917. Her owner, D. G. Schmitz of Seattle, delivered her to the U.S. Navy on 9 July 1917 for World War I service as a patrol vessel. She was commissioned as USS Sans Souci II (SP-301) on 1 August 1917.

Assigned to local duty within the 13th Naval District, Sans Souci II operated on patrol duty in the Puget Sound area from Seattle until September 1917. During late 1917, she served briefly as a tender to the protected cruiser USS Philadelphia (Cruiser No. 4), which was the receiving ship at Puget Sound Navy Yard at Bremerton, Washington.

After completing her support duties for Philadelphia, Sans Souci II resumed patrol duty in Puget Sound, frequently operating with, or alternating with, the submarine chaser USS SC-300, until 23 December 1918. She then remained inactive until she was decommissioned on 7 February 1919 and struck from the Navy List the same day.

Ordered returned to her owner on 26 March 1919, Sans Souci II remained on yacht registers into the early 1930s, suggesting that she remained in private use until that time.
