= USS Stallion =

USS Stallion may refer to:

- USS Stallion (YT-120) a district harbor tugboat built in 1920 and stricken in 1945.
- USS Stallion (ATA-193) a Sotoyomo-class tugboat serving from 1945–1969 and later in the Dominican Republic Navy as Enriquillo (RM-22).
