= USS Suncook =

USS Suncook is a name used more than once by the U.S. Navy:

- USS Suncook (1865), an American Civil War steamer.
- USS Suncook (AN-80), a net laying ship serving during World War II and later with the U.S. Bureau of Mines.
