= USS Shakamaxon =

USS Shakamaxon may refer to the following ships operated by the United States Navy:

- Shakamaxon (monitor), was laid down in November 1863 but never completed
- USS Shakamaxon (AN-88), was a net laying ship in service between 1944–1963
