= USS Silenus =

Tender of the United States Navy

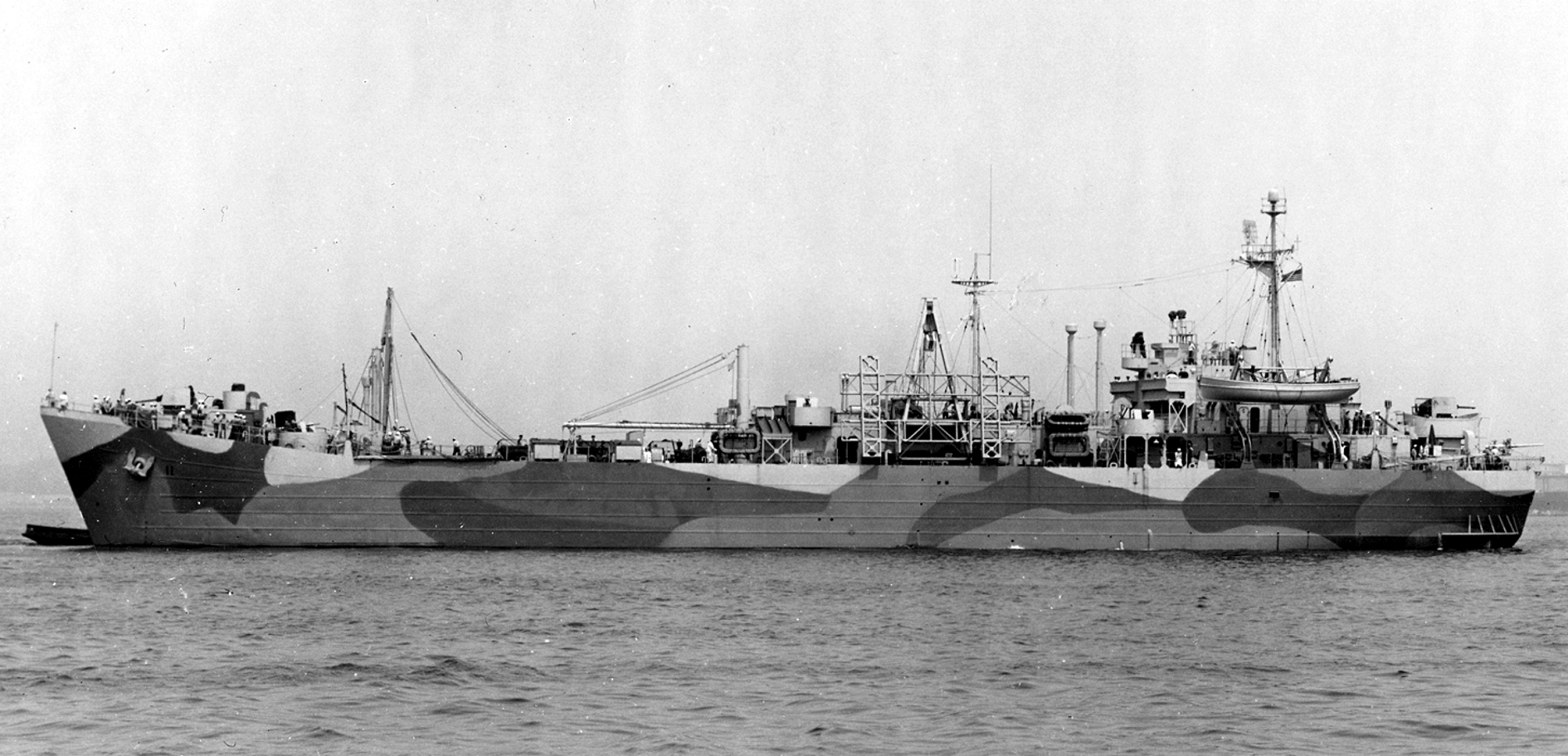
- Silenus at Norfolk, Virginia, 19 August 1944

History

United States
- Name: USS Silenus
- Namesake: Son of Hermes and a nymph, the oldest of the Satyrs.
- Builder: Chicago Bridge and Iron Co.
- Laid down: 28 October 1943
- Launched: 20 March 1944
- Commissioned: 8 April 1944
- Decommissioned: 14 March 1946
- In service: 1944
- Out of service: 1946
- Stricken: 17 April 1946
- Identification: Ship International Radio Callsign: NJXF
- Honours and awards: One Battle Star for World War Two Service
- Fate: Sold for scrapping, 25 July 1947, to A. G. Vincent

General characteristics
- Class & type: Portunus-class motor torpedo boat tenders
- Length: 328 feet
- Beam: 50 feet
- Draft: 11 feet 2 inches
- Propulsion: General Motors 12-567A Diesel engines, two propellers, 1,800 shp, twin rudders
- Speed: 11.6 Knots
- Complement: 37 Officers, 246 Enlisted
- Armour: one single 3 in (76 mm) dual purpose gun mount two quad 40 mm AA gun mounts eight single 20 mm AA gun mounts
- Aircraft carried: none
- Aviation facilities: none
- Notes: Largest Boom Capacity 50 tons

USS Silenus (AGP-11) was a Motor Torpedo Boat Tender in service with the United States Navy during World War II. She was laid down by Chicago Bridge and Iron on 28 October 1943 as LST-519. She was redesignated LST-604 on 18 December 1943 and launched on 20 March 1944. She was commissioned on 8 April 1944. LST-604 was decommissioned on 29 April 1944, at Maryland Drydock Co., Baltimore MD. for conversion to a Motor Torpedo Boat Tender. It lasted 104 days, the now USS Silenus, was recommissioned on 9 August 1944. On 14 March 1947 she was decommissioned and on 25 July 1947, she was scrapped. During World War II, USS Silenus was assigned to the Asiatic-Pacific Theater.

== Awards ==
- World War II Victory Medal
- Navy Occupation Service Medal (with Asia clasp)
- American Campaign Medal
- Asiatic-Pacific Campaign Medal
