= USS Skill =

The United States Navy lists two warships named USS Skill -

- USS Skill (AM-115), a metal-hulled fleet minesweeper placed in service on 17 November 1942.
- USS Skill (MSO-471), a wooden-hulled fleet minesweeper commissioned on 7 November 1955.
