= USS Sandusky =

USS Sandusky may refer to more than one United States Navy ship:

- USS Sandusky (1865), a single-turreted river monitor; completed 26 December 1865 and accepted by the Navy on 25 April 1866; never commissioned; was sold at Mound City, Illinois, on 17 April 1873
- USS Sandusky (PF-54), a Tacoma-class frigate that served from 1944 to 1945; lent to the Soviet Union, 1945; lent to Japan, 1953
