= USS Sandoval =

USS Sandoval is a name used more than once by the United States Navy:

- USS Sandoval (1895), a gunboat commissioned 2 September 1898
- USS Sandoval (APA-194), an attack transport commissioned 7 October 1944
