= USS Samar =

USS Samar may refer to:

- USS Samar (PG-41), was launched 1887 for Spanish navy, captured during Spanish–American War and taken into service with the US Navy, decommissioned 6 September 1920
- USS Samar (ARG-11), was launched 19 October 1944 and struck from the naval register 1 September 1962
