= USS Sagamore =

USS Sagamore is a name used more than once by the U.S. Navy:

- USS Sagamore (1861), a gunboat operating during the American Civil War.
- USS Sagamore (AT-20), a steel, oceangoing tug commissioned on 18 June 1918.
- USS Sagamore (ATA-208), launched on 17 January 1945; and commissioned on 19 March 1945.
