= USS Seminole =

USS Seminole may refer to the following ships of the United States Navy:

- USS Seminole (1859), launched in 1859, commissioned in 1860 and decommissioned in 1865.
- USS Seminole (1879), a tug, built in 1879, purchased as Kate Jones in 1898 and commissioned the same year. She was decommissioned in 1898, and transferred to the War Department in 1900.
- USS Seminole (AT-65), commissioned in 1940 and sunk by enemy action in October 1942.
- USS Seminole (AKA-104), commissioned in 1945 and decommissioned in 1970.
