= Starboard Unit =

United States Navy patrol commissioned circa 1918

History

United States
- Namesake: Previous name retained
- Acquired: 5 November 1918
- Commissioned: Never
- Fate: Returned to owner 5 March 1919
- Notes: Operated as civilian motorboat Starboard Unit until 1918 and from 1919

General characteristics
- Type: Patrol vessel
- Length: 112 ft 0 in (34.14 m) (waterline)

Starboard Unit was a United States Navy patrol vessel acquired in 1918 but never commissioned.

Starboard Unit was built as a civilian motorboat of the same name. On 5 November 1918, the U.S. Navy acquired her under a free lease from her owner, Joseph W. Marsh, for use as a section patrol boat during World War I.

World War I ended on 11 November 1918, six days after Starboard Unit's acquisition. No longer needed for naval service, Starboard Unit never received a section patrol (SP) number and was never commissioned. The Navy returned her to Marsh on 5 March 1919.
