= USS Spadefish =

USS Spadefish has been the name of more than one United States Navy ship, and may refer to:

- USS Spadefish (SS-411), later AGSS-411, a submarine in commission from 1944 to 1946
- USS Spadefish (SSN-668), a submarine in commission from 1969 to 1997
