= USS Sayonara II =

Patrol vessel of the United States Navy

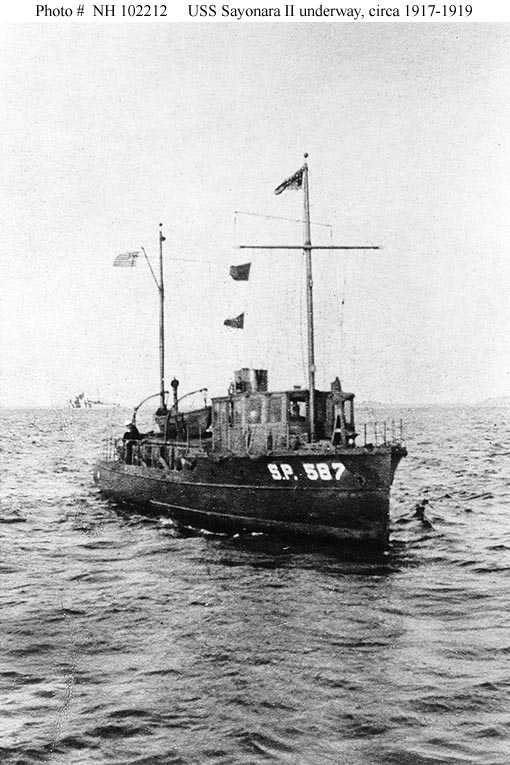
- USS Sayonara II (SP-587) underway sometime between 1917 and 1919.

History

United States
- Name: USS Sayonara II
- Namesake: Previous name retained
- Builder: George Lawley & Son, Neponset, Massachusetts
- Completed: 1916
- Acquired: 25 April 1917
- Commissioned: 8 May 1917
- Decommissioned: March 1919
- Fate: Returned to owner 10 April 1919
- Notes: Operated as private motorboat Sayonara II 1916-1917 and from 1919

General characteristics
- Type: Patrol vessel
- Tonnage: 46 gross register tons
- Length: 74 ft (23 m)
- Beam: 14 ft (4.3 m)
- Draft: 4 ft 6 in (1.37 m)
- Armament: 2 × 1-pounder guns

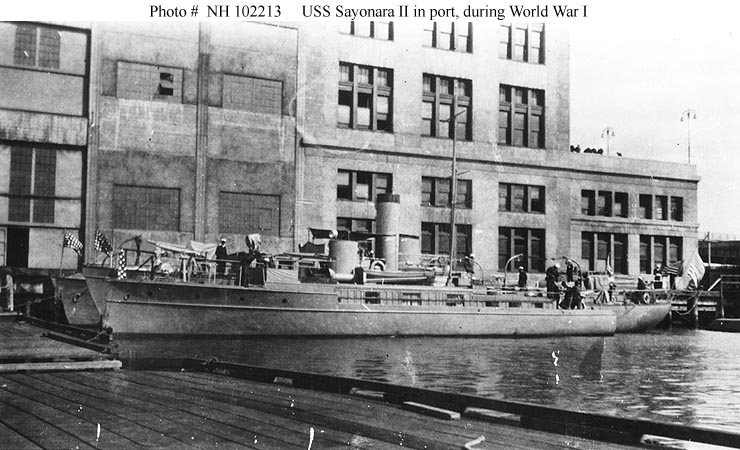
USS Sayonara II (SP-587) in port with other section patrol craft during World War I

USS Sayonara II (SP-587) was a United States Navy patrol vessel in commission from 1917 to 1919.

Sayonara II was built as a private motorboat of the same name by George Lawley & Son at Neponset, Massachusetts, in 1916. On 25 April 1917, the U.S. Navy acquired her under a $1.00 (USD)-per-month lease from her owner, Charles Blum of New York City, for use as a section patrol boat during World War I. She was commissioned as USS Sayonara II (SP-587) on 8 May 1917 .

Assigned to the 1st Naval District in northern New England, Sayonara II carried out patrol duties there for the rest of World War I and into early 1919.

Sayonara II was decommissioned in March 1919 and returned to Blum on 10 April 1919.
