= USS Sam Houston =

Two ships of the United States Navy have been named USS Sam Houston.

- The first USS Sam Houston (1861) was a schooner serving during the American Civil War.
- The second USS Sam Houston (SSBN-609) was an Ethan Allen-class submarine serving during the Cold War, named for the President of the Republic of Texas.
