= USS Sweet Brier =

Gunboat of the United States Navy

History

United States
- Laid down: date unknown
- Launched: 1862
- Acquired: 22 September 1863
- Commissioned: 25 January 1864
- Decommissioned: 13 July 1865
- Stricken: 1865 (est.)
- Fate: Sold, 25 October 1865

General characteristics
- Displacement: 240 tons
- Length: 120 ft 0 in (36.58 m)
- Beam: 21 ft 3 in (6.48 m)
- Draught: depth of hold 10 ft 0 in (3.05 m); draft 9 ft 6 in (2.90 m)
- Propulsion: steam engine; screw-propelled
- Speed: 9 knots
- Complement: 37
- Armament: one 20-pounder Parrott rifle; one heavy 12-pounder smoothbore

USS Sweet Brier was a steamer acquired by the Union Navy during the American Civil War.

Sweet Briar was used by the Union Navy as an armed tugboat in support of the Union Navy blockade of Confederate waterways.

== Commissioned at New York City in 1862 ==
Sweet Brier—a wooden screw tug built at Buffalo, New York, in 1862—was purchased by the Union Navy at New York City on 22 September 1863; and was commissioned at the New York Navy Yard on 25 January 1864.

== Assigned to blockade duty with the South Atlantic blockade ==
The tug departed New York City on 3 February 1864, and arrived off Charleston, South Carolina, on 4 March and was assigned to blockade duty off that southern port.

On 8 July, she captured blockade running schooner Pocahontas off Charleston laden with cotton.

Sweet Brier continued to serve in the South Atlantic Blockading Squadron through the end of the war and sailed north on 27 June 1865.

== Post-war decommissioning, sale and subsequent maritime career ==
She was decommissioned at the New York Navy Yard on 13 July 1865 and was sold at public auction there on 25 October to D. T. Rowland. She was redocumented as Conqueror on 28 December 1866 and remained in merchant service until 1900.
