= USS Sirius =

Three ships of the United States Navy have been named Sirius, after Sirius (α Canis Majoris), the brightest star visible from Earth other than the Sun.

- USS Sirius (AK-15) was a Sirius-class cargo ship. Originally SS Saluda, the ship was built in 1918–1919 and acquired by the Navy in 1921. She was struck from the Navy list in 1946. The following year, she was sold for scrap.
- USS Sirius (AF-60) was a stores ship. Originally SS Tradewind, she was launched in 1942, and delivered to the U.S. Maritime Commission in 1943. She was acquired by the Navy in 1956, and struck in 1965. She was sold in 1971.
- USNS Sirius (T-AFS-8) was a combat stores ship. Originally RFA Lyness (A339), she was launched in 1966 and purchased by the U.S. Navy in 1981. She was deactivated and struck in 2005, and assigned to the Texas Maritime Academy to serve as training ship TS Texas Clipper III.
