= USS St. Regis River =

1945 LSM(R)-501-class landing ship medium

History

United States
- Name: USS St. Regis River (LSM(R)-529)
- Builder: Brown Shipbuilding Company
- Laid down: June 1945
- Launched: July 1945
- Commissioned: 7 September 1945
- Decommissioned: 31 March 1946
- Renamed: St. Regis River, 1 October 1955
- Stricken: 1 October 1958
- Fate: Scrapped, 5 July 1960

General characteristics
- Class & type: LSM(R)-501-class landing ship medium
- Displacement: 758 long tons (770 t) light; 993 long tons (1,009 t) attack; 1,175 long tons (1,194 t) full
- Length: 203 ft 3 in (61.95 m)
- Beam: 34 ft 6 in (10.52 m)
- Draft: 5 ft 4 in (1.63 m) light; 6 ft 9 in (2.06 m) attack; 7 ft 9 in (2.36 m) full
- Propulsion: 2 × General Motors, non-reversing with airflex clutch, Cleveland diesels, 1,440 bhp (1,074 kW) each at 720 rpm, 2 screws
- Speed: 13 knots (24 km/h; 15 mph)
- Range: 3,000 nmi (5,600 km) at 13 kn (24 km/h; 15 mph)
- Complement: 6 officers, 137 enlisted
- Armament: 1 × 5"/38 caliber gun; 2 × twin 40 mm AA guns; 4 × twin 20 mm AA guns; 4 × 4.2 in (110 mm) mortars; 20 × continuous loading 5 in (130 mm) Ship-to-Shore rocket launchers
- Armor: 10-lb. STS on conning station, pilot-house, radio room, radar plot, and rocket control; 10-lb. ASPP around 40 and 20 mm gun mounts and directors

USS St. Regis River (LSM(R)-529) was a LSM(R)-501 class landing ship. Originally the ship only had the designation LSMR-529. She was laid down in June 1945 by the Brown Shipbuilding Co. at Houston, Texas, as LSMR-529, a rocket-armed medium landing ship; launched in July 1945; and commissioned on 7 September 1945.

LSMR-529 was active in Navy service from September 1945 until March 1946, but remained in the United States. In March 1946, she was placed out of commission, in reserve, and berthed at Green Cove Springs, Florida, where she remained for the next 14 years. On 1 October 1955, LSMR-529 was named St. Regis River. Never recommissioned, St. Regis River was sold to the Atlas Iron and Metal Corp. on 5 July 1960 for scrapping.
