= USS Seal =

Two submarines of the United States Navy have been named USS Seal for the seal, a marine mammal.

- USS Seal (SS-19½), the first submarine built for the Navy by Simon Lake, was renamed G-1.
- USS Seal (SS-183), a Salmon-class submarine that served before and during the early years of World War II.
