= USS Sotoyomo =

USS Sotoyomo may refer to the following ships of the United States Navy:

- USS Sotoyomo (YTM-9) a district harbor tug laid down in 1903 and struck in 1946.
- USS Sotoyomo (ATA-121) a Sotoyomo-class tugboat serving from 1942 to 1961
