= USS Saugus =

Three ships of the United States Navy have been named Saugus:

- USS Saugus (1863), Canonicus-class single-turret monitor
- USS Saugus (LSV-4), an Osage-class vehicle landing ship which served during World War II
- Saugus (YTB-780), Natick-class tugboat
