= USS Solace =

Two ships of the United States Navy have been named Solace:

- USS Solace (AH-2) was a hospital ship in service during the Spanish–American War and World War I
- USS Solace (AH-5) was a hospital ship in service during World War II
