= USS Shur =

Patrol vessel of the United States Navy

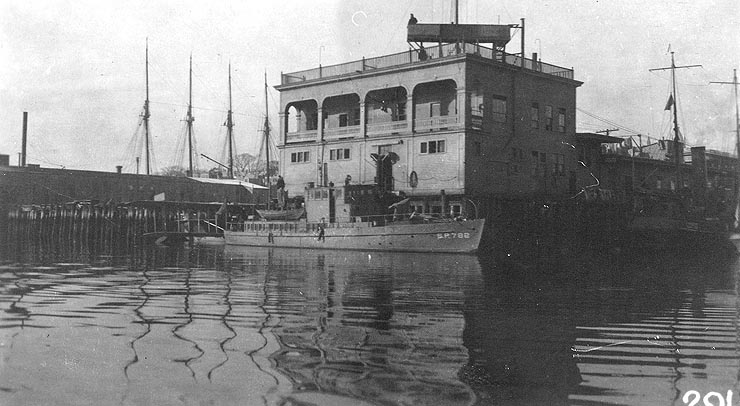
- USS Shur (SP-782) at the Portland Section Base in Portland, Maine, ca. 1918.

History

United States
- Name: USS Shur
- Namesake: Previous name retained
- Builder: Murray and Tregurtha, South Boston, Massachusetts
- Completed: 1906
- Acquired: 11 June 1917
- Commissioned: 22 June 1917
- Decommissioned: 18 January 1919
- Stricken: 18 September 1919
- Fate: Sold 4 December 1919
- Notes: Operated as private motorboat Tyche and Shur from 1906 to 1917

General characteristics
- Type: Patrol vessel
- Tonnage: 48 Gross register tons
- Length: 78 ft 8 in (23.98 m)
- Beam: 12 ft 6 in (3.81 m)
- Draft: 4 ft (1.2 m)
- Speed: 12.7 knots
- Complement: 15
- Armament: 1 × 1-pounder gun; 1 × machine gun

USS Shur (SP-782) was a United States Navy patrol vessel in commission from 1917 to 1919.

Shur was built as the private motorboat Tyche in 1906 by Murray and Tregurtha at South Boston, Massachusetts. She later was renamed Shur.

On 11 June 1917, the U.S. Navy acquired Shur from her owner, F. W. Pollard of Boston, Massachusetts, for use as a section patrol boat during World War I. She was commissioned on 22 June 1917 as USS Shur (SP-782).

Assigned to the 1st Naval District in northern New England, Shur carried out patrol duties for the rest of World War I and into January 1919.

Shur was decommissioned on 16 January 1919 and stricken from the Navy List on 18 September 1919. She was sold to William H. Browning of New York City on 4 December 1919.
