= USS Sea Devil =

USS Sea Devil has been the name of more than one United States Navy ship, and may refer to:

- USS Sea Devil (SS-400), later AGSS-400, a submarine in commission from 1944 to 1948, from 1951 to 1954, and from 1957 to 1964
- USS Sea Devil (SSN-664), a submarine in commission from 1969 to 1991
