= USS Serpens =

USS Serpens may refer to the following ships of the United States Navy:

- USS Serpens (AK-97), a United States Coast Guard-manned Crater-class cargo ship in World War II.
- USS Serpens (AK-266), an Alchiba-class cargo ship that was on loan to South Korea for the duration of its Navy career (1951–1960).
