= USS Sanders =

USS Sanders has been the name of more than one United States Navy ship, and may refer to:

- USS Sanders (DE-273), a destroyer escort transferred to the United Kingdom upon completion in 1943 which served in the Royal Navy as the frigate HMS Grindall (K477) from 1943 to 1945 and in the U.S. Navy as the destroyer escort USS Grindall from August to October 1945
- USS Sanders (DE-40), a destroyer escort in commission from 1943 to 1945
