= USS Surprise (1815) =

Ketch

History

United States
- Name: USS Surprise
- Acquired: 1815
- Commissioned: 1815
- Fate: Sold 1820

General characteristics
- Type: Ketch

The second USS Surprise and third American naval ship of the name was a ketch that served in the United States Navy from 1815 to 1820.

Surprise was purchased by the U.S. Navy at New Orleans, Louisiana, in March 1815 for operations in a small squadron commanded by Commodore Daniel Todd Patterson against pirates and slave traders.

On 18 June 1818, Surprise, commanded by Lieutenant Isaac M'Keever, captured the schooners Merino and Louisa, which carried between them 25 slaves. M'Keever took the prizes to Mobile, Alabama, where they were condemned after prolonged litigation.

In the autumn of 1818, Surprise captured a buccaneer schooner which had been operating out of Galveston, Texas, under Mexican colors. On board the prize was General Humbert, a Frenchman, who was the head of the nest of pirates at Galveston.

Surprise was sold at New Orleans in 1820.
