= USS Samoa =

Two ships in the United States Navy have been named USS Samoa:

- The first USS Samoa (1917) was a steamship used in the South Pacific from 1917 to 1920.
- The second USS Samoa (CB-6) was to have been used for a large Alaska-class cruiser, but it was cancelled in 1943.
