= USS Saturn =

USS Saturn is a name used more than once by the United States Navy:

- USS Saturn (AG-4), an iron collier, was launched during 1890 by Harlan & Hollingsworth Co., Wilmington, Delaware
- USS Saturn (AK-49), a cargo ship acquired by the Navy on 20 April 1942
- USNS Saturn (T-AFS-10) was a combat stores ship acquired from the United Kingdom in 1983.
