= USS Sabine =

Two ships of the United States Navy have been named USS Sabine, after the Sabine River along the Texas/Louisiana border.

- The first USS Sabine (1855) was a sailing frigate started in 1822 but not completed until 1855, and in service during the American Civil War.
- The second USS Sabine (AO-25) was a fleet oiler purchased in 1940 and on active service until 1969.
