= USS Sunflower =

USS Sunflower is a name used more than once by the United States Navy:

- USS Sunflower (1863), a gunboat during the American Civil War.
- USS Sunflower (1907), a vessel for the United States Lighthouse Service.
