= USS Stonewall =

USS Stonewall is a name used more than once by the United States Navy:

- USS Stonewall (1863), a schooner captured by the Union Navy and placed in service as a ship's tender.
- USS Stonewall (IX-185), a tanker built in 1921 at Alameda, California, by the Bethlehem Steel Company.

== See also ==
- USS Stonewall Jackson, a United States Navy submarine commissioned 1964
- CSS Stonewall Jackson, cottonclad ram in service with the Confederate States Navy from March–April 1862
- Japanese ironclad Kōtetsu, originally commissioned as CSS Stonewall in 1865
