= USS St. George =

USS St. George can refer to the following ships of the United States Navy;

- USS St. George (AV-16), a Kenneth Whiting-class seaplane tender that served with the US from 1944 to 1968. The ship was sold to Italy and renamed Andrea Bafile.
- USS St. George (ACV-17), a Bogue-class escort carrier transferred to the United Kingdom during World War II and entered service with the Royal Navy as the Attacker-class escort carrier HMS Pursuer
