= USS Sachem =

USS Sachem has been the name of more than one United States Navy ship, and may refer to:

- USS Sachem (1776), a sloop of war commissioned in 1776
- USS Sachem (1861), a steamer commissioned in 1861 and lost in 1863
- USS Sachem (SP-192), a patrol craft in commission from 1917 to 1919
