= USS Security =

Minesweeper of the United States Navy

History

United States
- Name: Security
- Laid down: 29 April 1941
- Launched: 27 September 1941
- In service: 11 March 1942
- Out of service: 16 November 1945
- Stricken: 28 November 1945
- Fate: Sold, 13 August 1946

General characteristics
- Class & type: Accentor-class minesweeper
- Displacement: 195 tons
- Length: 98 ft 5 in (30.00 m)
- Beam: 23 ft 6 in (7.16 m)
- Draught: 9 ft (2.7 m)
- Speed: 10 knots (19 km/h; 12 mph)
- Armament: 2 × machine guns

USS Security (AMc-103) was an Accentor-class coastal minesweeper acquired by the U.S. Navy for the task of removing naval mines laid in the water to prevent ships from passing.

Security was laid down on 29 April 1941 by H.G. Marr, Damariscotta, Maine; launched on 27 September 1941; sponsored by Miss Louise Marr; and placed in service on 11 March 1942.

== World War II service ==
Assigned to the 5th Naval District, Security, a wooden-hulled coastal minesweeper, trained at Yorktown, Virginia, from 27 March to 11 April, then began operations out of Morehead City, North Carolina. On 20 May 1944, she was detached from the 5th Naval District and reassigned to the 1st Naval District where she operated into May 1945.

With the end of the war in Europe however, she was designated for inactivation; and, on 25 July, she was ordered south to the 6th Naval District to await disposal. She arrived at Charleston, South Carolina, on 8 August and was placed out of service on 16 November. Her name was struck from the Navy list on 28 November, and she was sold, via the Maritime Commission's War Shipping Administration, on 13 August 1946 to Mr. Philip Filetto, Gloucester, Massachusetts.
