= USS Sciota =

USS Sciota may refer to the following ships of the United States Navy:

- USS Sciota (1861), one of the “ninety-day gunboats” rushed through construction at the beginning of the American Civil War.
- USS Sciota (AT-30), laid down on 30 November 1918 at the Navy Yard, Puget Sound, Washington; launched on 11 June 1919; and commissioned on 13 November 1919.
- USS Sciota (ATA-205), an ocean tugboat laid down on 12 October 1944 at the Gulfport Boiler and Welding Works, Port Arthur, Texas; launched on 26 November 1944; and commissioned on 30 January 1945.
