= USS Snapper (SP-2714) =

Patrol vessel of the United States Navy

History

United States
- Name: USS Snapper
- Namesake: Previous name retained
- Builder: T. E. Tull, Pocomoke City, Maryland
- Completed: 1906
- Acquired: 14 September 1918
- Commissioned: 5 October 1918
- Fate: Sold 11 September 1919
- Notes: Operated as commercial fishing boat Snapper 1906-1917

General characteristics
- Type: Patrol vessel
- Tonnage: 60 Gross register tons
- Length: 84 ft 0 in (25.60 m)
- Beam: 10 ft 6 in (3.20 m)
- Draft: 4 ft 6 in (1.37 m) mean
- Propulsion: Gasoline engine
- Speed: 7.9 knots
- Complement: 5

The second USS Snapper (SP-2714) was a patrol vessel in the U.S. Navy, in service from 1918 to 1919.

Snapper was built as a gasoline-powered commercial fishing boat of the same name in 1906 by T. E. Tull at Pocomoke City, Maryland. On 14 September 1918, the U.S. Navy purchased her at Norfolk, Virginia, from W. S. Webber of Norfolk for use as a section patrol boat during World War I. She was commissioned at Norfolk as USS Snapper (SP-2714) on 5 October 1918.

Assigned to the 5th Naval District, Snapper served on patrol duty in Hampton Roads and the Virginia Capes area through the end of World War I.

Snapper was sold to the Neptune Line of New York City on 11 September 1919.
