= USS Silver Cloud =

USS Silver Cloud is a name used more than once by the United States Navy, and may refer to:

- USS Silver Cloud (1862), a "tinclad" in commission from 1863 to 1865 that served in the American Civil War
- USS Silver Cloud (IX-143), a tanker in commission from 1944 to 1946
