= USS Southampton =

USS Southampton has been the name of two ships of the United States Navy.

- USS Southampton (1841), a side wheel steamer, laid down in 1841, which served from 1845 until 1855
- USS Southampton (AKA-66), a Tolland-class attack cargo ship which served from 1944 until 1946
