= USS Safeguard =

USS Safeguard is a name used more than once by the United States Navy:

- USS Safeguard (ARS-25), laid down, 5 June 1943, at Basalt Rock Co. Inc., Napa, California.
- USNS Safeguard (T-ARS-50), laid down on 8 November 1982 by Peterson Builders, Sturgeon Bay, Wisconsin; launched on 12 November 1983; and commissioned on 17 August 1985.
