= USS Sassacus (YT-193) =

Tugboat of the United States Navy

History

United States
- Name: USS Sassacus
- Namesake: A native American word meaning "tribe"
- Owner: United States Navy
- Builder: Ira S. Bushey & Son
- Laid down: 21 April 1942
- Launched: 31 July 1942
- In service: 7 December 1942
- Fate: Unknown

General characteristics
- Class & type: Pessacus-class tugboat
- Displacement: 260 tons
- Length: 100 ft 10 in (30.73 m)
- Beam: 25 ft (7.6 m)
- Draft: 11 ft (3.4 m)
- Speed: 12 knots
- Complement: 10

USS Sassacus (YT-193) was a tugboat built for the U.S. Navy during World War II.

Sassacus was laid down on 21 April 1942 by Ira S. Bushey and Son, Brooklyn, New York; launched on 31 July 1942; and delivered to the Navy and placed in service on 7 December 1942.

== Service history ==
Assigned initially to the 3d Naval District and redesignated YTB-193 on 15 May 1944, Sassacus remained in the New York area until early 1945. Then reallocated to the 12th Naval District, she moved south; transited the Panama Canal; and assumed harbor tug duties in the San Francisco area. A year and a half later, however, she was ordered inactivated and was placed out of service, in reserve, on 26 November 1946. Redesignated YTM-193 in February 1962, she remained in reserve until transferred, on loan, to the government of Venezuela in January 1963, where she remained until 1974.
