= USS Skimmer (AMc-53) =

Minesweeper of the United States Navy

History

United States
- Laid down: 2 January 1941
- Launched: 7 June 1941
- In service: 26 August 1941
- Out of service: 31 July 1946
- Stricken: 28 August 1946
- Fate: fate unknown

General characteristics
- Displacement: 213 tons
- Length: 97 ft 1 in (29.59 m)
- Beam: 22 ft (6.7 m)
- Draught: 8 ft 6 in (2.59 m)
- Speed: 10.0 knots
- Complement: 7
- Armament: two .30 cal (7.62 mm) machine guns

USS Skimmer (AMc-53) was an Accentor-class coastal minesweeper acquired by the U.S. Navy for the dangerous task of removing mines from minefields laid in the water to prevent ships from passing.

The first ship to be named Skimmer by the Navy, AMc-53 was laid down on 2 January 1941 by the Snow Shipyards at Rockland, Maine; launched on 7 June 1941; sponsored by Mrs. Mildred Manlove; and placed in service on 26 August 1941.

== World War II service ==
Skimmer spent her first four days of Navy service at Boston, Massachusetts; then was ordered to Yorktown, Virginia, for 15 days training. She departed Boston on 30 August and arrived at Yorktown on 2 September.

Later that month, she was ordered to the 4th Naval District for duty, departing Yorktown on the 18th. Skinner spent all her wartime service in the 4th Naval District on coastal and harbor patrol; and, on 31 July 1946, she was placed out of service at Norfolk, Virginia.

== Deactivation ==
Her name was struck from the Navy list on 28 August 1946. On 15 April 1947, she was transferred from the Navy to the Maritime Commission for disposal at Charleston, South Carolina. She was subsequently sold to the Bowater Paper Co., Inc., of New York City.
