= USS Satellite (SP-1012) =

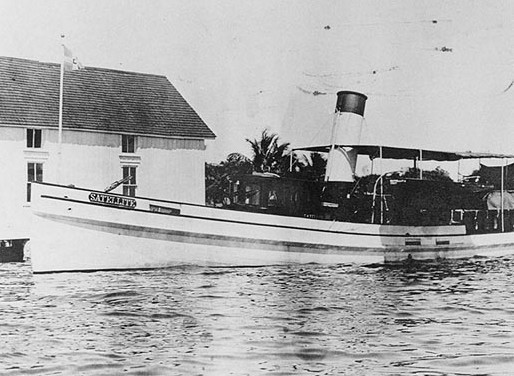
- USS Satellite (yacht)

History

United States
- Laid down: date unknown
- Launched: 1887 at Brooklyn, New York
- Acquired: 9 July 1917
- Commissioned: 7 September 1917
- Out of service: 6 April 1918
- Stricken: 30 March 1920
- Homeport: Key West, Florida
- Fate: Scrapped

General characteristics
- Displacement: 27 long tons (27 metric tons)
- Length: 87 ft (27 m)
- Beam: 12 ft 3 in (3.73 m)
- Draft: 5 ft 7 1/2 in (1.715 m) (mean)
- Propulsion: steam engine
- Speed: 14 knots
- Complement: crew of 9
- Armament: two one-pounder guns

USS Satellite (SP-1012) was a yacht acquired by the U.S. Navy for use as a training ship during World War I. She operated out of Key West, Florida, and was scrapped at war's end.

== World War I service ==
Soon after the United States entered World War I, Satellite, a wooden yacht, built during 1887 by John F. Mumm at Brooklyn, New York, was enrolled in the Naval Coast Defense Reserve for Navy service. She was delivered to the Navy on 9 July 1917 by her owner, E. L. Sanborn of New York City, and commissioned on 7 September 1917.

Assigned to local duty within the 7th Naval District, Satellite was based at Key West, Florida, during her World War I service. She trained crews of new submarine chasers about to be commissioned, by a vigorous schedule of seamanship drills and gunnery exercises, until inactivated about 6 April 1918 for overhaul.

== Post-war deactivation ==
The Satellite was not returned to full service because of boiler trouble, and was struck from the Navy list on 30 March 1920. She was subsequently sold for scrapping.
