= USS Scout (SP-114) =

Patrol vessel of the United States Navy

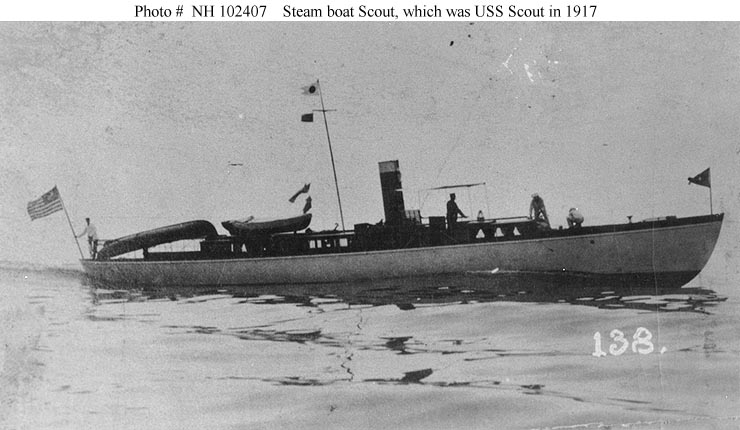
- Scout in civilian use sometime between 1900 and 1917, prior to her U.S. Navy service.

History

United States
- Name: USS Scout
- Namesake: Previous name retained
- Builder: Herreshoff Manufacturing Company, Bristol, Rhode Island
- Completed: 1900
- Acquired: 25 May 1917
- Commissioned: 25 June 1917
- Fate: Returned to owner 12 December 1917
- Notes: In civilian use 1900-1917 and from 1917

General characteristics
- Type: Patrol vessel
- Tonnage: 30 tons
- Length: 81 ft (25 m)
- Beam: 10 ft 7 in (3.23 m)
- Draft: 3 ft 5 in (1.04 m)
- Propulsion: Steam engine
- Speed: 22 knots
- Armament: 1 × 3-pounder gun

The second USS Scout (SP-114) was an armed steamboat that served in the United States Navy as a patrol vessel in 1917.

Scout was built as a civilian pleasure craft in 1900 by the Herreshoff Manufacturing Company at Bristol, Rhode Island. The U.S. Navy acquired Scout from her owner, Mr. August Belmont of New York City, on 25 May 1917 for use as a patrol boat during World War I. She was commissioned on 25 June 1917 as USS Scout (SP-114).

Assigned to the 3rd Naval District, Scout served on patrol duty in the New York City area for five months. Apparently she was unsuitable for naval service, because the Navy returned her to her owner on 12 December 1917.
