= USS Spark (1831) =

History

United States
- Name: USS Spark
- Acquired: 1831
- In service: 1831
- Out of service: 1832
- Fate: sold in May 1832

General characteristics
- Type: schooner
- Displacement: 50 tons
- Propulsion: sail
- Sail plan: schooner rig
- Complement: 14
- Armament: One gun

USS Spark was a schooner purchased by the United States Navy during the early days of the republic. She was assigned to patrolling for lumber smugglers along the lower East Coast of the United States.

== Service history ==
The second ship to be so named by the Navy, Spark was purchased by the Navy in 1831 at Baltimore, Maryland, and sailed early in April to Washington, D. C., to be repaired and fitted out; and commissioned on or near 19 May 1832, Lt. William Piercy in command. The schooner departed early in June and remained at Norfolk, Virginia, until the 27th when she headed for the Florida coast to protect live oak timber on public lands in the southern states. She was impeded in her voyage south by adverse winds and did not reach St. Augustine, Florida, until 12 August. She cruised along the coast of Georgia and Gulf of Mexico looking for lumber poachers until May 1832. Spark then returned north and was sold.
