= USS Sea Foam (IX-210) =

History

United States
- Name: USS Sea Foam
- Builder: Fore River Shipbuilding Corporation
- Launched: 25 June 1917
- Commissioned: 15 May 1945
- Decommissioned: 24 December 1946
- In service: 1917
- Out of service: 1946
- Fate: Scrapped 1947

General characteristics
- Displacement: 6,666 tons (Full)
- Length: 431 feet, 6 inches
- Beam: 56 feet
- Propulsion: one vertical triple expansion steam engine; three single end Scotch boilers, 220psi Sat°; single propeller, 3,000shp
- Speed: 10+ knots
- Armament: one 5" gun mount; one 3"/50 gun mount; eight 20mm guns

USS Sea Foam (IX-210) was a Mobile Floating Storage Tanker of the United States Navy in the closing stages of World War II. Sea Foam was built as the SS Pennsylvania—an Emergency Fleet Corporation Design 1045 tanker in Quincy, Massachusetts, in 1917 for World War I civilian merchant service.

== World War II ==
During most of World War II, the Pennsylvania operated as a merchant tanker. She was allocated to the Navy while undergoing repairs at Northwestern Iron Works in Portland, Oregon, in February 1945. Commissioned as Sea Foam at Pearl Harbor on 15 May 1945, the tanker remained there until 23 June while further repairs were being made. On 24 June, Sea Foam, along with YOG-57 and PC-1569, left Pearl Harbor and proceeded to Eniwetok via the Johnston Islands, arriving on 8 July. From 9 July to 6 September, Sea Foam was engaged in routine duty fueling vessels in the harbor at Eniwetok. She departed Eniwetok on the 7th for Tokyo Bay, anchoring there on the 21st. She fueled vessels in Tokyo Bay until 31 October 1945.

== Post war ==
Sea Foam departed Asian waters on 1 November and headed for the Panama Canal. She arrived in Mobile, Alabama, on 24 December, where she was decommissioned and redelivered to the War Shipping Administration on 8 February 1946. Struck from the Naval Register on 26 February, Sea Foam was sold to the H. H. Buncher Co. on 9 July 1947 for $14,010.00.
