= USS Sussex (SP-685) =

Minesweeper of the United States Navy

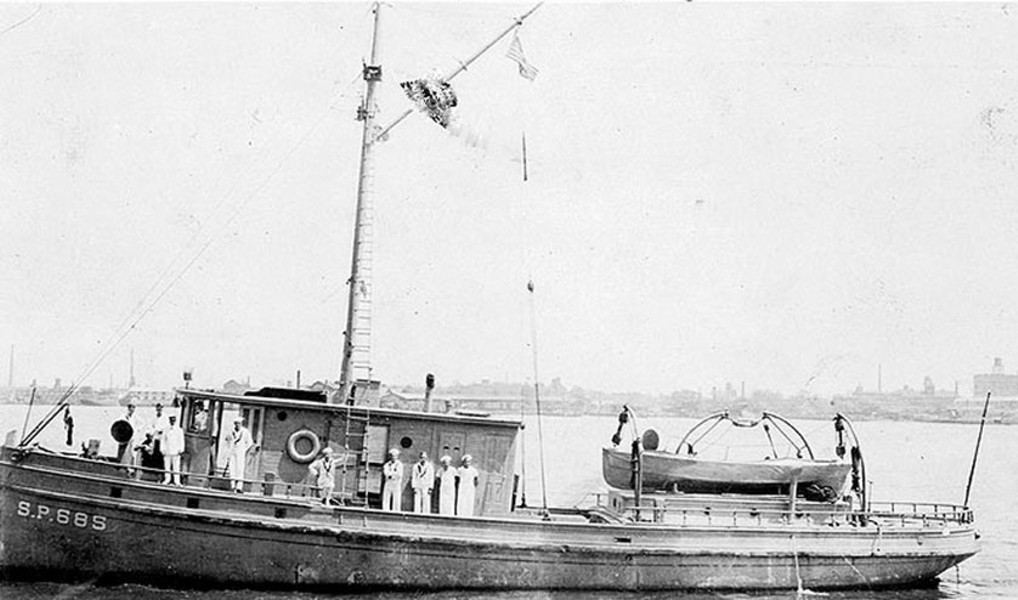
- USS Sussex (SP-685) with her crew posed on deck, c. 1917-1919.

History

United States
- Name: Sussex
- Namesake: Counties in Delaware, New Jersey, and Virginia
- Builder: R. T, Potter, Milton, Delaware
- Laid down: date unknown
- Completed: in 1913
- Acquired: by the U.S. Navy, 5 May 1917
- Commissioned: 31 July 1917
- Decommissioned: c. 11 March 1919
- Stricken: 11 March 1919
- Fate: Sold 16 January 1920; fate unknown

General characteristics
- Type: commercial freighter
- Displacement: 67 tons
- Length: 74 ft 2 in (22.61 m)
- Beam: 17 ft 6 in (5.33 m)
- Draft: 6 ft 9 in (2.06 m)
- Propulsion: steam-powered
- Speed: 8 knots
- Complement: 22 personnel
- Armament: two 1-pounder guns

USS Sussex (SP-685) was a commercial fishing freighter acquired by the U.S. Navy during World War I. She served as a minesweeper on the U.S. East Coast through the war and was sold after the World War I Armistice.

== A steamer built in Delaware ==
The first ship to be so named by the Navy, Sussex (SP-685) -- a fishing steamer built in 1913 by R. T. Potter at Milton, Delaware—was acquired by the Navy on 5 May 1917 from the Delaware Fish Oil Co., Lewes, Delaware; and was commissioned on 31 May 1917.

== First World War service ==
Sussex operated as a minesweeper in the Third Naval District for the remainder of the conflict and for a few months following the November 1918 Armistice.

== Post-war inactivation ==
She was struck from the Navy list on 11 March 1919 and sold on 16 January 1920.
