= USS Surf (SP-341) =

Minesweeper of the United States Navy

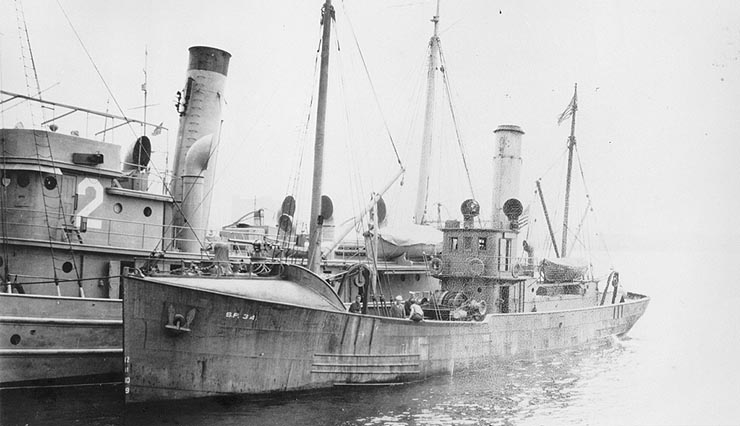
- USS Surf (SP-341) tied up beside another ship.

History

United States
- Name: USS Surf
- Namesake: Previous name retained
- Builder: Fore River Shipbuilding Company, Quincy, Massachusetts
- Completed: 1911
- Acquired: 21 April 1917
- Commissioned: 8 May 1917
- Stricken: 2 April 1919
- Fate: Returned to owners 2 April 1919
- Notes: Operated as commercial fishing trawler Surf 1911-1917 and from 1919

General characteristics
- Type: Minesweeper
- Tonnage: 252 gross register tons
- Length: 129 ft 6 in (39.47 m)
- Beam: 22 ft 6 in (6.86 m)
- Draft: 12 ft (3.7 m)
- Propulsion: Steam engine
- Speed: 9.5 knots
- Complement: 26
- Armament: 1 × 3-pounder gun

USS Surf (SP-341) was a minesweeper that served in the United States Navy from 1917 to 1919.

Surf was built as a commercial fishing trawler of the same name in 1911 by the Fore River Shipbuilding Company at Quincy, Massachusetts, for the Bay State Fishing Company of Boston, Massachusetts. On 21 April 1917, the U.S. Navy leased her for use as a minesweeper during World War I. She was commissioned on 8 May 1917 as USS Surf (SP-341).

Assigned to the 1st Naval District, Surf performed minesweeping duties in northern New England for the remainder of World War I.

Surf was stricken from the Navy List on 2 April 1919 and returned to the Bay State Fishing Company the same day.
