= USS Swift (1864) =

Tender of the United States Navy

History

United States
- In service: 1864
- Out of service: 1865
- Captured: by Union Navy forces; 9 February 1864
- Fate: Sold, 8 August 1865

General characteristics
- Displacement: 12 tons
- Propulsion: schooner sail
- Armament: two 12-pounder howitzers

USS Swift was a small 12-ton schooner captured by the Union Navy during the Union blockade of the American Civil War.

Swift was used by the Union Navy as a ship’s tender, serving ships at Tybee Island, Georgia, and at Port Royal, South Carolina.

== Service history ==
Swift was a small schooner captured by the monitor USS Patapsco on 9 February 1864 in Wassau Sound, Georgia. No record has been found of any filing of libel papers against the schooner, but she was taken into the South Atlantic Blockading Squadron. The vessel served at Tybee Island, Georgia, and at Port Royal, South Carolina, as a ship's tender. Swift was sold at public auction there on 8 August 1865.
