= USS Shearwater (1887) =

American naval vessel

History

United States
- Name: Shearwater
- Namesake: Any of numerous oceanic birds related to the petrels and albatrosses that usually skim close to the waves in flight
- Owner: H. R. Wolcott
- Builder: Hawthorne and Company at Leith, Scotland
- Completed: in 1887
- Acquired: by the United States Navy on 9 May 1889
- In service: 31 December 1898 (as a training ship)
- Out of service: 24 April 1908
- Stricken: 24 April 1908
- Fate: Sold in 1908

General characteristics
- Type: Schooner
- Propulsion: Schooner sail

USS Shearwater was a schooner acquired by the United States Navy in 1889. She served in the Navy until 1898, when she was loaned to Pennsylvania as a training ship. She remained in service in Philadelphia, Pennsylvania, until struck and sold in 1908.

== Service history ==
The first ship so named by the Navy, Shearwater, a steel schooner-rigged yacht, was built in 1887 by Hawthorne and Company at Leith, Scotland, and purchased by the Navy on 9 May 1889 from H. R. Wolcott. Loaned to the Pennsylvania Naval Militia on 31 December 1898, she served as a training ship at Philadelphia, Pennsylvania. Shearwater was struck from the Navy list on 24 April 1908. She was sold in the Fall of 1908 to Mr. Samuel B. Wilson and delivered to him at the Philadelphia Navy Yard.
