= USS Cardinal =

USS Cardinal may refer to:

- USS Cardinal (AM-6), was a Lapwing-class minesweeper that served between World War I and World War II.
- USS Cardinal (AM-67), was built as the civilian fishing boat Jeanne D'Arc, then acquired and used by the Navy as a minesweeper during World War II.
- The construction of Cardinal (AM-393) was canceled in November 1945 before launching.
- USS Cardinal (AMS-4), was first commissioned as YMS-179, a YMS-1-class minesweeper during World War II. Cardinal (AMS-4) was one of her several names and designations during her career.
- USS Cardinal (MHC-60), was an Osprey-class minehunter. Cardinal was transferred to Egypt in January 2007.
