= USS Swan (AMS-37) =

Minesweeper of the United States Navy

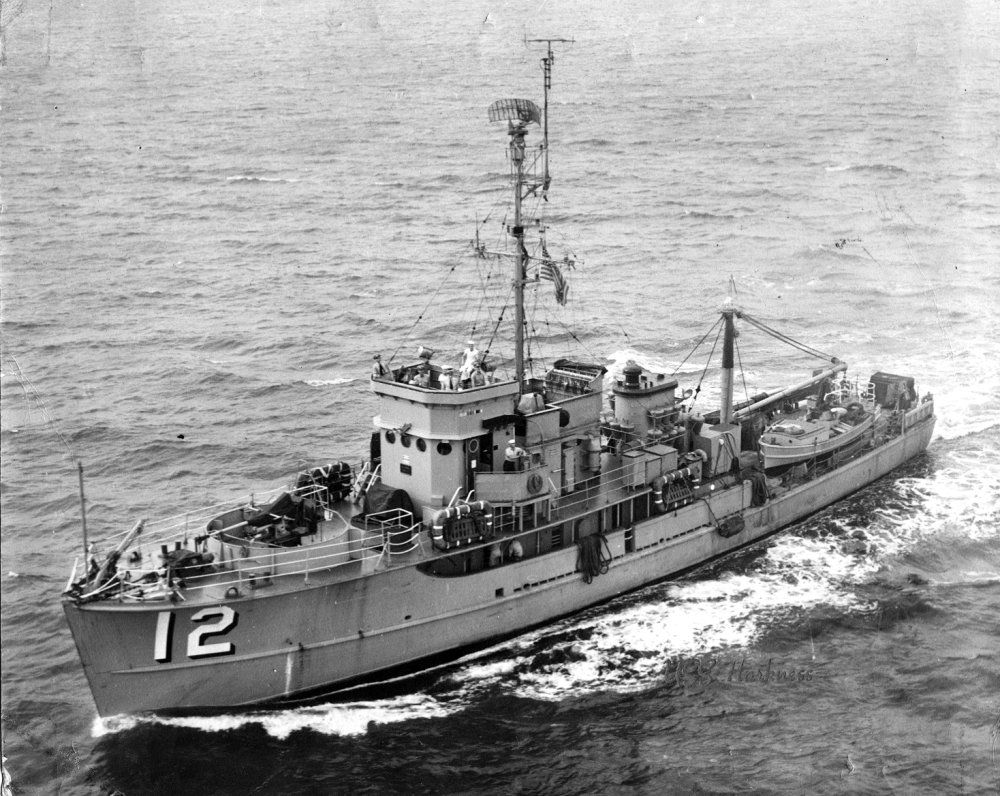
- A YMS class minesweeper

History

United States
- Name: USS Swan
- Ordered: as Patrol Craft Sweeper, PCS-1438
- Builder: Gibbs Gas Engine Co., Jacksonville, Florida
- Laid down: 12 August 1943
- Launched: 5 April 1944
- Commissioned: 14 October 1944
- Decommissioned: 1 June 1946
- Recommissioned: 8 November 1950
- Decommissioned: 6 October 1955
- Renamed: Swan, 18 February 1947
- Reclassified: YMS-470 (Auxiliary Motor Minesweeper), 27 September 1943; AMS-37 (Motor Minesweeper), 1 June 1946; MSC(O)-37 (Coastal Minesweeper (Old)), 1 August 1955
- Stricken: 1 November 1959
- Fate: Sold to General Motors as a research vessel

General characteristics
- Class & type: YMS-1 class minesweeper
- Displacement: 320 long tons (325 t) full
- Length: 136 ft (41 m)
- Beam: 24 ft 6 in (7.47 m)
- Draft: 6 ft 1 in (1.85 m)
- Propulsion: 2 × 880 bhp (656 kW) General Motors 8-268A diesel engines; Snow and Knobstedt single reduction gear; 2 shafts
- Speed: 12 knots (22 km/h; 14 mph)
- Complement: 33 officers and enlisted
- Armament: 1 × 3"/50 caliber gun; 2 × 20 mm guns

The second USS Swan was a US Navy YMS-1-class minesweeper in commission from 1944 to 1946, and again from 1950 to 1955. She was laid down on 12 August 1943 by the Gibbs Gas Engine Co., at Jacksonville, Florida, as Patrol Craft, Sweeper, PCS-1438; and was redesignated Auxiliary Motor Minesweeper YMS-470, on 27 September 1943. Launched on 5 April 1944; the ship was completed and commissioned on 14 October 1944.

== World War II Pacific Ocean operations ==
YMS-470 operated along the east coast of the United States until March 1945. She then sailed to the South Pacific and operated in the vicinity of New Caledonia and the New Hebrides until August. From there, the minesweeper moved north for duty at Okinawa and in Japan, in connection with post-war minesweeping and the occupation of Japan. YMS-470 returned to the United States in mid-April 1946 and, on 1 June, was decommissioned and placed in reserve at Stockton, California. While there, she was named USS Swan and redesignated AMS-37.

== Post-war operations ==
In 1950, with the outbreak of hostilities in Korea, Swan was called back to active service. She was towed to the Bethlehem Pacific Coast Corp. yard at San Francisco, California, where she was recommissioned on 8 November 1950. For just over three years, the ship trained crews for minesweepers serving in the Far East. She operated with Mine Squadron 5 on the west coast, first as flagship of Mine Division (MinDiv) 55 and later of MinDiv 51. In January 1954, Swan was reassigned to MinDiv 45 of the Atlantic Fleet and home ported at the Minecraft Base in Charleston, South Carolina. A year later, she joined MinDiv 44 as a school ship at the Mine Warfare School at Yorktown, Virginia. She was redesignated MSC(O)-37 on 1 August 1955, and reported to the Florida Group, Atlantic Reserve Fleet for inactivation and decommissioning.

== Decommissioning ==
USS Swan was decommissioned on 6 October 1955 and berthed at Green Cove Springs, Florida. Her name was struck from the Navy list on 1 November 1959, and she was sold to the General Motors Defense Research Laboratories at Santa Barbara, California, for conversion to a research vessel. In around 1980 she was sold to Honolulu based Windjammer Cruises and reanamed to Royal Taipan and finally scuttled out of Honolulu.
