= USS Albatross (AMS-1) =

Minesweeper of the United States Navy

History

United States
- Laid down: 27 June 1941
- Launched: 5 May 1942
- Commissioned: USS YMS-80, 15 July 1942
- Decommissioned: 20 March 1958
- Stricken: 20 March 1958
- Fate: Sold 19 February 1959

General characteristics
- Displacement: 320 tons
- Length: 136 ft (41 m)
- Beam: 25 ft (7.6 m)
- Draught: 10 ft (3.0 m)
- Propulsion: two 880bhp General Motors 8-268A diesel engines, two shafts
- Speed: 14.5 kts
- Complement: 27
- Armament: one 3 in (76 mm) gun mount, four .50 cal (12.7 mm) machine guns, two dct

USS Albatross (AMS-1/YMS-80) was an YMS-1-class auxiliary motor minesweeper acquired by the U.S. Navy during World War II for clearing coastal minefields.

YMS-80 was laid down on 27 June 1941 at Cleveland, Ohio, by the Stadium Yacht Basin, Inc.; launched on 5 May 1942; and commissioned on 15 July 1942.

== World War II service ==
The minesweeper sailed for Boston, Massachusetts, on 16 August, in company with her sistership YMS-81 and the coastal patrol yacht Cymophane (PYC-26), and, proceeding via Quebec and Halifax, the latter part of the voyage with coastal convoy XB-36, reached her destination on 1 September.

=== Assigned as a school ship ===
After completing fitting out at the Boston Navy Yard on 21 September 1942, YMS-80 then proceeded to her new assignment via New York, New York; assigned to the Mine Warfare School at Yorktown, Virginia, she served as a school ship, training sailors in minesweeping, from 13 October 1942. After completing that tour of temporary duty at the Mine Warfare School on 13 March 1943, she proceeded to Naval Operating Base, Norfolk, and reported to Commander in Chief, Atlantic Fleet, for duty. On 4 July, she commenced minesweeping operations out of Portland, Maine, for antisubmarine warfare training with Task Group 27.1. Detached on 28 August 1943, YMS-80 proceeded thence to Quonset Point, Rhode Island, and operated with the Aircraft Antisubmarine Development Detachment, Atlantic Fleet, out of Narragansett Bay, into the autumn of 1944.

=== Florida operations ===
On 8 October 1944, YMS-80 arrived at Port Everglades, Florida, to operate with the Surface Detachment of the Antisubmarine Development unit, Atlantic Fleet on temporary duty. Her duties there varied from retrieving targets to acting as a reference and target vessel—at one point (26–28 December 1944) operating with submarine R-13 (SS-90) – and continued into the post-World War II period; a Commander Task Force 69 dispatch alluded to the continued experimental nature of her work referring to her as E-YMS-80.

== Redesignated USS Albatross (AMS-1) ==
On 17 February 1947, she was named Albatross and redesignated as AMS-1; on 18 August 1947, she was redesignated EAMS-1, and on 7 February 1955, to experimental coastal minesweeper (old), EMSC(O)-1, the last designation being followed on 19 February 1955 with her being transferred from Mine Force, Atlantic, to Commander, 6th Naval District (Charleston, South Carolina) for administrative and operational control. She thus spent the remainder of her career based at Key West, Florida, ranging from her home port to Tampa, West Palm Beach, and Miami, Florida; Nassau, in the Bahamas; Havana, Matanzas, Santiago, and Guantánamo Bay, Cuba; Eleuthera, British West Indies; and occasionally ranging as far north as Charleston, and Norfolk, Virginia.

== Decommissioning ==
Albatross departed Key West for the final time on 17 March 1958 and arrived at Green Cove Springs, Florida, on 19 March 1958. Decommissioned and placed in reserve, Albatross was simultaneously struck from the Navy list on 20 March 1958. Sold on 19 February 1959 to Dorado, Inc., of Wildwood, New Jersey, the former minecraft was renamed Dorado. She served as a fishing boat, homeported at Reedville, Virginia, into the 1960s.
