= USS Brambling (AMS-42) =

Minesweeper of the United States Navy

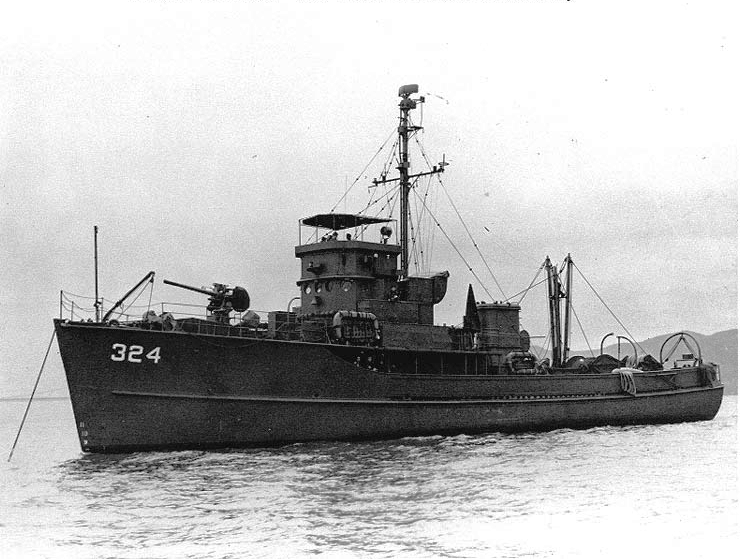
- A YMS-1-class minesweeper

History

United States
- Ordered: as YMS-109
- Laid down: 21 May 1941
- Launched: 16 May 1942
- Commissioned: 23 September 1942
- Decommissioned: 7 August 1946
- In service: 7 August 1946
- Out of service: 17 July 1955
- Stricken: November 1959
- Fate: Sold 31 August 1961, fate unknown

General characteristics
- Displacement: 350 tons
- Length: 136 ft (41 m)
- Beam: 24 ft 6 in (7.47 m)
- Draught: 6 ft 1 in (1.85 m)
- Speed: 12 knots
- Complement: 50
- Armament: one 3 in (76 mm) gun mount, two 20 mm machine guns

USS Brambling (AMS-42/YMS-109) was a YMS-1-class auxiliary motor minesweeper acquired by the U.S. Navy for the task of removing mines from water that had been placed there to prevent ships from passing.

The second ship to be named Brambling by the Navy was laid down as YMS-109 on 21 May 1941 at Manitowoc, Wisconsin, by the Burger Boat Co.; launched on 16 May 1942; and commissioned on 23 September 1942.

== World War II service ==
After completing her outfitting period, YMS-109 reported for duty with the 5th Naval District. She conducted minesweeping operations out of Little Creek, Virginia, and performed experimental work in the York River. In addition, the motor minesweeper escorted coastal shipping and made antisubmarine patrols in the Chesapeake Bay area.

=== Transit to Pacific Ocean ===
Those duties lasted until 20 July 1945 when YMS 109 departed Norfolk, Virginia, on her way to the U.S. West Coast. Sailing via Miami, Florida and the Panama Canal, she arrived at San Pedro, California, on 15 August. After repairs at Wilmington, California, YMS-109 moved south to San Diego, California. On 1 October, she departed San Diego in company with several other yard craft bound for the Hawaiian Islands. The minesweeper remained in the islands through the end of 1945 and into the early months of 1946. During that time, she conducted patrols and carried passengers between various places in the islands.

== Post-war activity ==
In April 1946, YMS-109 departed Pearl Harbor to return to the United States. She arrived in San Francisco, California, on 2 May and unloaded her minesweeping gear. On 28 May, she got underway for the U.S. East Coast. The minesweeper transited the Panama Canal on 13 June and continued her voyage to Tompkinsville, New York, where she arrived on 1 July.

== Naval Reserve training ship ==
On 12 July, she returned to sea, bound ultimately for Detroit, Michigan. En route, the warship visited Quebec, Canada, before heading up the St. Lawrence River and into Lake Ontario. She arrived at Detroit on 24 July. On 7 August 1946, YMS-109 was decommissioned at the Detroit Naval Armory where she began duty as a naval reserve training ship. She was named Brambling and was redesignated AMS-42 on 19 August 1947. Her naval reserve training assignment in the 9th Naval District lasted until the beginning of 1950. In February of that year, she was placed in reserve at Orange, Texas.

== Reactivated during Korean War ==
Her retirement, however, proved to be only a year in duration since the outbreak of the war in Korea in June 1950 prompted an increase in the Navy's demand for active warships. Accordingly, Brambling was recommissioned on 12 February 1951. Her role, though, was not of an active combat nature. Instead, she helped free ships of the U.S. Atlantic Fleet—ships in a higher state of combat readiness than she—for service in the combat zone.

== Assigned to school ship and other duties ==
Throughout the Korean War, Brambling made her contribution as a training ship at the Mine Warfare School, Yorktown, Virginia, helping to train minesweeper sailors for service in Korean waters. Later, after the Korean War subsided, she occupied her time with the U.S. Atlantic Fleet and independent ships exercises punctuated by assignments with the Naval Mine Defense Laboratory at Panama City, Florida. On 7 February 1955, Brambling was redesignated MSCO-42.

== Inactivation and decommissioning ==
Not long thereafter, however, she received orders to prepare for inactivation at Green Cove Springs, Florida. The warship arrived there on 19 April and was immediately placed in commission, in reserve, for the inactivation process. On 17 July 1955, Brambling was decommissioned and berthed with the Green Cove Springs Group, Atlantic Reserve Fleet. Her name was struck from the Navy list sometime in November 1959, and she was sold on 31 August 1961 to Mr. H. G. Mann, of Jacksonville, Florida.
