= USS YMS-61 =

Decommissioned U.S. Navy ship

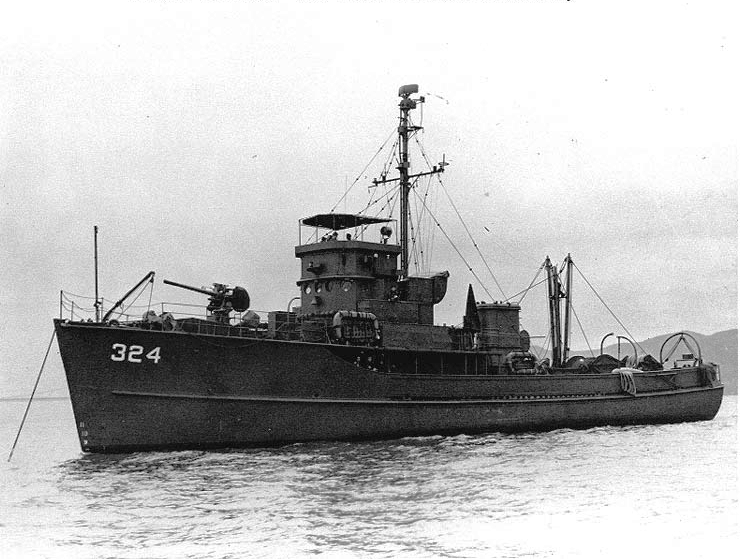
- A YMS-1-class minesweeper

History

United States
- Name: USS YMS-61
- Commissioned: 23 June 1942
- Decommissioned: 19 June 1946

General characteristics
- Class & type: YMS-1-class minesweeper
- Displacement: 320 long tons (325 t)
- Length: 136 ft (41 m)
- Beam: 24 ft 6 in (7.47 m)
- Draft: 6 ft 1 in (1.85 m)
- Propulsion: 2 × General Motors diesel engines, two shafts.
- Speed: 13 knots (24 km/h; 15 mph)
- Complement: 32
- Armament: 1 × 3"/50 caliber gun; 2 × 20 mm guns; 2 × Depth charge tracks; 2 × Depth charge projectors

USS YMS-61 was a United States Navy YMS-1-class auxiliary motor minesweeper during World War II. She was laid down 23 September 1941 by the Gibbs Gas Engine Co. She was commissioned on 23 June 1942. Assigned to the Caribbean she operated in the former Netherlands Antilles. She was struck from the Naval Registry on 19 June 1946.
