= USS Fulmar (AMS-47) =

Minesweeper of the United States Navy

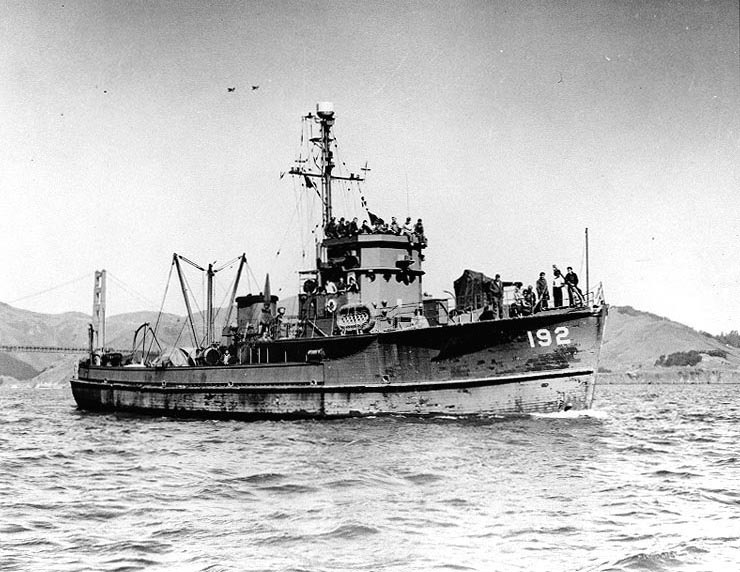
- A YMS-1-class minesweeper

History

United States
- Laid down: 31 October 1942
- Launched: 2 January 1943
- Commissioned: 1 September 1947
- Decommissioned: date unknown
- Stricken: 1 October 1968
- Fate: Sold, 1 October 1968

General characteristics
- Displacement: 270 tons
- Length: 136 ft (41 m)
- Beam: 24 ft 6 in (7.47 m)
- Draught: 8 ft (2.4 m)
- Propulsion: two 1,000 shp General Motors diesel engines, two shafts
- Speed: 15 kts
- Complement: 32
- Armament: one single 3 in (76 mm) gun mount, two 20 mm, two dcp

USS Fulmar (AMS-47/YMS-193) was a YMS-1-class minesweeper of the YMS-135 subclass acquired by the U.S. Navy for use in World War II. Her task was to clear minefields in coastal waterways.

Fulmar was laid down, 31 October 1942 by the Greenport Basin and Construction Co., Long Island, Greenport, New York; launched, 2 January 1943; completed, 28 June 1943; commissioned USS YMS-193; reclassified as a motor minesweeper and named Fulmar (AMS 47), 1 September 1947; and reclassified as a coastal minesweeper (Old), MSC(O)-47, 7 February 1955.

Fulmar was struck from the Naval Register, 1 October 1968 and sold. Her ultimate fate is unknown.
