= USS Pelican (AMS-32) =

Minesweeper of the United States Navy

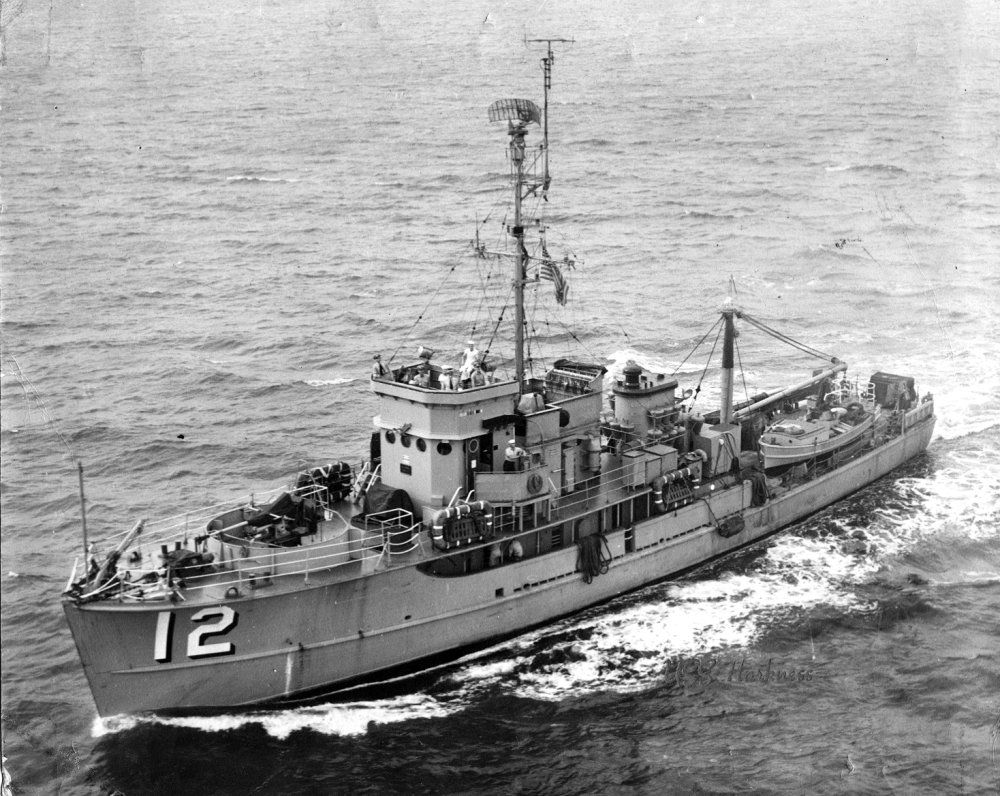
- A YMS-1-class minesweeper

History

United States
- Name: USS YMS-441
- Builder: Robert Jacob Inc.; City Island, New York
- Laid down: 27 November 1943
- Launched: 13 November 1944
- Commissioned: 21 February 1945
- Renamed: USS Pelican (AMS-32), 18 February 1947
- Namesake: the pelican bird
- Decommissioned: 16 April 1955
- Reclassified: MSC(O)-32, 7 February 1955
- Fate: lent to Japan, 16 April 1955
- Acquired: returned from Japan, April 1968
- Stricken: 1 May 1968
- Fate: Scrapped

Japan
- Name: JDS Ogishima (MSC-659)
- Acquired: 16 April 1955
- Fate: Returned to the U.S. Navy, April 1968

General characteristics
- Class & type: YMS-135 subclass of YMS-1-class minesweepers
- Displacement: 350 tons
- Length: 136 ft (41 m)
- Beam: 24 ft 6 in (7.47 m)
- Draft: 6 ft 1 in (1.85 m)
- Propulsion: 2 × 880 bhp General Motors 8-268A diesel engines; 2 shafts
- Speed: 12 knots (22 km/h)
- Complement: 50
- Armament: 1 × 3"/50 caliber gun mount; 2 × 20 mm guns; 2 × depth charge projectors

USS Pelican (MSC(O)-32/AMS-32/YMS-441) was a YMS-1-class minesweeper of the YMS-135 subclass acquired by the U.S. Navy for the task of removing mines that had been placed in the water to prevent ships from passing.

== History ==
Pelican was laid down as YMS-441 on 27 November 1943 by Robert Jacob Inc. of City Island, New York; launched 13 November 1944; and commissioned 21 February 1945.

After shakedown on the east coast, YMS-441 sailed for the Pacific 10 April, finally arriving at Okinawa in August. While there, she participated in minesweeping exercises and in several minesweeping operations with the U.S. 3rd Fleet.

Returning to the United States in February 1946, YMS-441 operated along the California coast until November, when she sailed to Guam. Arriving in Guam in January 1947, YMS-441 swept for mines in the Caroline and Marshall Islands.

While at Guam, YMS-441 was named USS Pelican and classified AMS-32 on 18 February. Sailing for Pearl Harbor in late September, Pelican arrived in October and immediately entered the yards to be outfitted as an experimental ship for the Eniwetok atomic bomb tests. All her minesweeping gear was removed and special electronic gear was installed. Based in the Eniwetok Atoll area, she supported the test in the first half of 1948. After returning to Pearl Harbor in June 1948, the electronic gear was removed and her minesweeping gear was replaced. Pelican remained in the Hawaiian Islands area for the next two years of her service.

At the start of the Korean War, USS Pelican deployed to Korea. In October 1950, Pelican was part of a group consisting of Thompson (DMS-38), Carmick (DMS-33), Forrest Royal (DD-872), Catamount (LSD-17), Horace A. Bass (APD-124), Swallow (AMS-36), Gull (AMS-16), LST-Q-007, four Republic of Korea minesweepers, and a helicopter from Rochester (CA-124) that cleared the heavily mined port of Chinnampo in less than two weeks.

She remained in the Far East until 1955. On 7 February, she was reclassified MSC(O)-32 and on 16 April of that year, she was loaned to Japan, becoming Ogishima (MSC-659).

Returned to the U.S. Navy in April 1968, she was struck from the Naval Vessel Register on 1 May 1968.
