= USS Gull (AMS-16) =

Minesweeper of the United States Navy

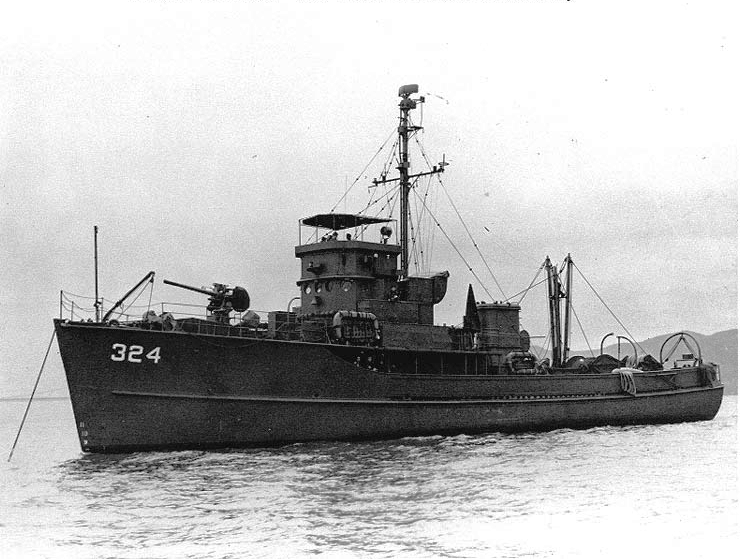
- USS YMS-324 in San Francisco Bay, c. 1945–46

History

United States
- Name: USS YMS-324
- Builder: Al Larson Boat Shop; Terminal Island, California
- Laid down: 3 June 1943
- Launched: 14 October 1943
- Sponsored by: Mrs. William Toman
- Commissioned: 28 February 1944
- Renamed: USS Gull (AMS-16), 18 February 1947
- Namesake: gull
- Reclassified: AMCU-46, 1 August 1954
- Decommissioned: 14 January 1958
- Reclassified: MHC-46, 7 February 1955
- Stricken: March 1959
- Honors and awards: 2 battle stars, World War II; 9 battle stars, Korean War; Navy Unit Commendation, Korean War
- Fate: disposed of in March 1959

General characteristics
- Class & type: YMS-135 subclass of YMS-1-class minesweepers
- Displacement: 380 tons (f.)
- Length: 136 ft (41 m)
- Beam: 24 ft 6 in (7.47 m)
- Draft: 10 ft (3.0 m)
- Propulsion: 2 × 880 bhp General Motors 8-268A diesel engines; 2 shafts
- Speed: 14 knots (26 km/h)
- Complement: 34
- Armament: 1 × 3"/50 caliber gun mount; 2 × 20 mm guns; 2 × depth charge projectors

USS Gull (MHC-46/AMCU-46/AMS-16/YMS-324) was a YMS-1-class minesweeper of the YMS-135 subclass acquired by the U.S. Navy for the task of removing mines that had been placed in the water to prevent ships from passing.

== History ==
The second ship to be named Gull by the Navy, AMS-16 was launched as YMS-324 by the Al Larson Boat Shop, Terminal Island, California, 14 October 1943; sponsored by Mrs. William Toman; and commissioned 28 February 1944.

After shakedown and minesweeping training, YMS-324 sailed from San Pedro, California, 20 June 1944 via Pearl Harbor and reached Guadalcanal 1 August to prepare for the coming invasion of Peleliu. She put in at Peleliu and swept her first enemy mine 14 September, the day before the famous 1st Marine Division stormed ashore, and for the next month continued minesweeping operations there and at Ulithi. Sailing from Ulithi 14 October for the attack on the Ngulu Islands, the ship swept mines under enemy fire without damage or casualties and subsequently continued her duties at Ulithi until departing 19 March 1945 for Okinawa. YMS-324 aided in clearing the approaches to Okinawa, and remained in those waters until the fall of 1945, returning to San Pedro, California, 20 September 1945, 15 months to the day from the time she left.

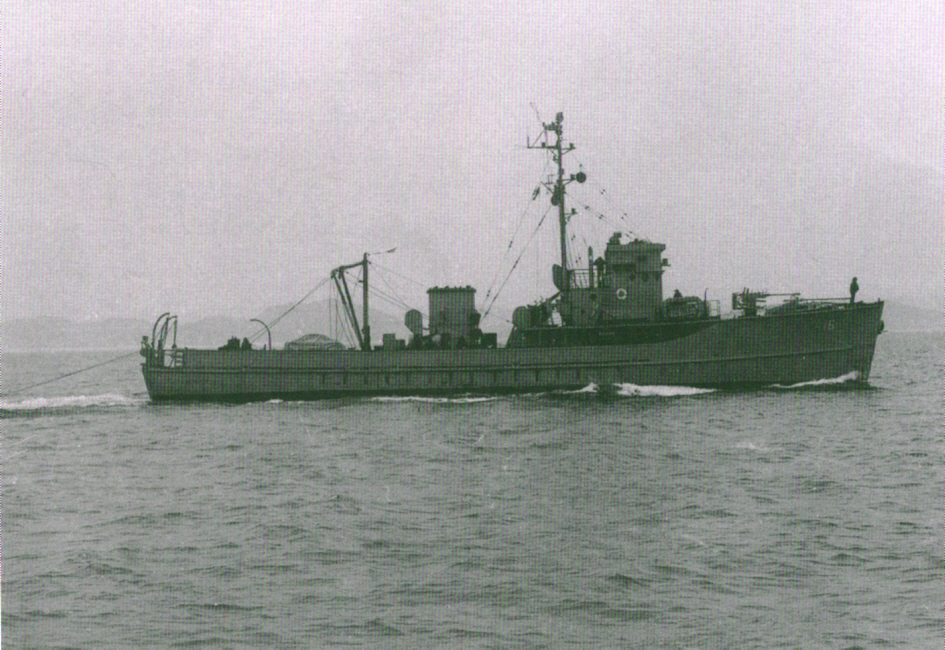
USS Gull (AMS-16) conducts minesweeping operations on 15 June 1951 in support of commando raid by British Royal Marines on Chinnampo, North Korea, during the Korean War.

Renamed and redesignated Gull (AMS-16) on 18 February 1947, she returned to the western Pacific Ocean in the autumn of 1947, via Pearl Harbor, and conducted peacetime training until putting in at Chinnampo, Korea, 2 November 1950 to support United Nations forces by sweeping mines as part of a group consisting of Thompson (DMS-38), Carmick (DMS-33), Forrest Royal (DD-872), Catamount (LSD-17), Horace A. Bass (APD-124), Pelican (AMS-32), Swallow (AMS-36), LST-Q-007, four Republic of Korea minesweepers, and a helicopter from Rochester (CA-124). Gull remained off Chinnampo for more than a month and through her untiring efforts the approaches to that port were cleared, allowing an evacuation accomplished without loss of life. For this hazardous duty Gull was awarded the Navy Unit Commendation.

On 1 August 1954 Gull was redesignated AMCU-46 and underwent conversion at Yokosuka, Japan. Redesignated again as MHC-46 on 7 February 1955, she returned to Long Beach, California, in May, 1955, and subsequently conducted peacetime training duty out of southern California ports until 14 January 1958. Decommissioned at San Diego, California, that date, she was disposed of in March 1959.

== Awards and honors ==
YMS-324 was awarded two battle stars for World War II service and Gull was awarded nine battle stars and the Navy Unit Commendation for Korean War service.
