= USS YMS-418 =

Minesweeper of the United States Navy

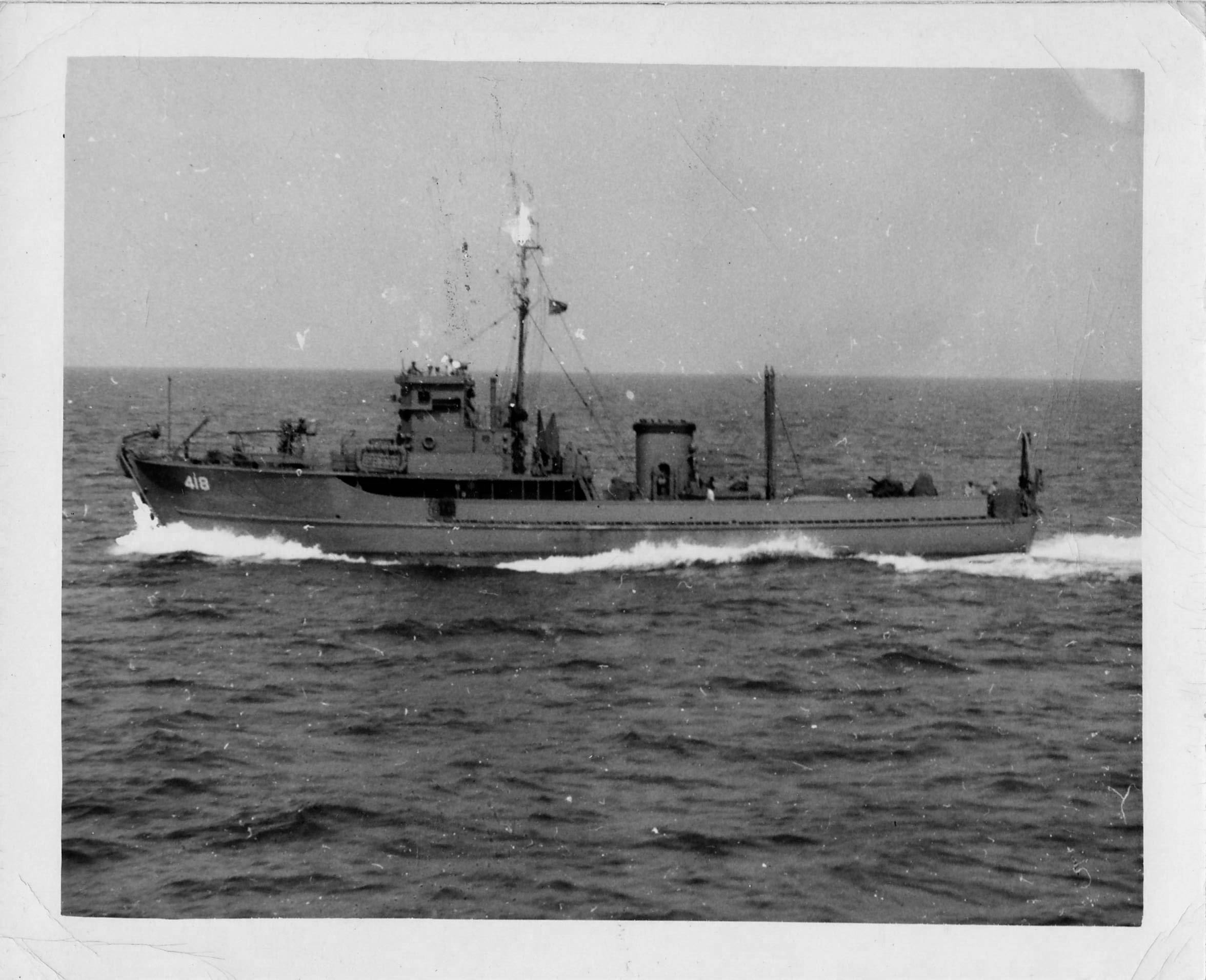
- YMS-418 photographed in 1945

History

United States
- Name: USS YMS-418
- Builder: Henry C. Grebe & Co.
- Laid down: 16 September 1943
- Launched: 22 February 1944
- Stricken: 7 February 1947
- Fate: Sold

General characteristics
- Class & type: YMS-135 subclass of YMS-1-class minesweepers
- Displacement: 270 tons
- Length: 136 ft (41 m)
- Beam: 24.6 ft (7.5 m)
- Draft: 8 ft (2.4 m)
- Propulsion: 2 × 880 bhp General Motors 8-268A diesel engines; 2 shafts
- Speed: 13 knots (24 km/h)
- Complement: 32
- Armament: 1 × 3"/50 caliber gun mount; 2 × 20 mm guns; 2 × depth charge projectors

The YMS-418 was a YMS-1 class minesweeper which saw service in World War II. The hull was laid down 16 September 1943 by Henry C. Grebe and Co., Chicago, IL. It was launched 22 February 1944 It was struck from the Navy Register 7 February 1947 and sold 17 December 1947. Its fate is unknown.
