= USS Partridge (AMS-31) =

Minesweeper of the United States Navy

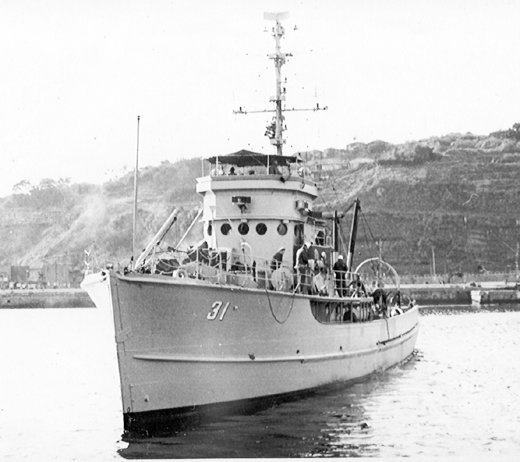

History

United States
- Name: USS YMS-437
- Namesake: the partridge bird
- Laid down: 3 October 1944
- Launched: 22 April 1945
- Commissioned: 25 July 1945
- Renamed: USS Partridge (AMS-31), 18 February 1947
- Namesake: the partridge bird
- Stricken: 27 February 1951
- Fate: Struck a mine and sank, 2 February 1951

General characteristics
- Class & type: YMS-135 subclass of YMS-1-class minesweepers
- Displacement: 350 tons
- Length: 136 ft (41 m)
- Beam: 24 ft 6 in (7.47 m)
- Draft: 6 ft 1 in (1.85 m)
- Propulsion: 2 × 880 bhp General Motors 8-268A diesel engines; 2 shafts
- Speed: 12 knots (22 km/h)
- Complement: 50
- Armament: 1 × 3"/50 caliber gun mount; 2 × 20 mm guns; 2 × depth charge projectors

USS Partridge (AMS-31/YMS-437) was a YMS-1-class minesweeper of the YMS-135 subclass built for the United States Navy in World War II.

== History ==
Partridge was laid down as YMS-437 on 3 October 1944 by J. M. Martinac Corp., Tacoma, Washington; launched 22 April 1945; and commissioned 25 July 1945.

Upon fitting out, YMS-437 reported to the U.S. Pacific Fleet for duty on 16 August. Assigned to the First Fleet, YMS-437 conducted operations in the Hawaiian Islands area and along the U.S. West Coast. She was reclassified and named Partridge (AMS-31) 18 February 1947.

In late 1951, Partridge joined the U.S. forces in Korea. Ordered to assist in clearing Wonsan Harbor of mines, the little minesweeper struck a mine and sank 2 February 1951. Eight of her crew were killed and six were wounded. She was struck from the Naval Vessel Register on 27 February.
