= USS Barbet (AMS-41) =

Minesweeper of the United States Navy

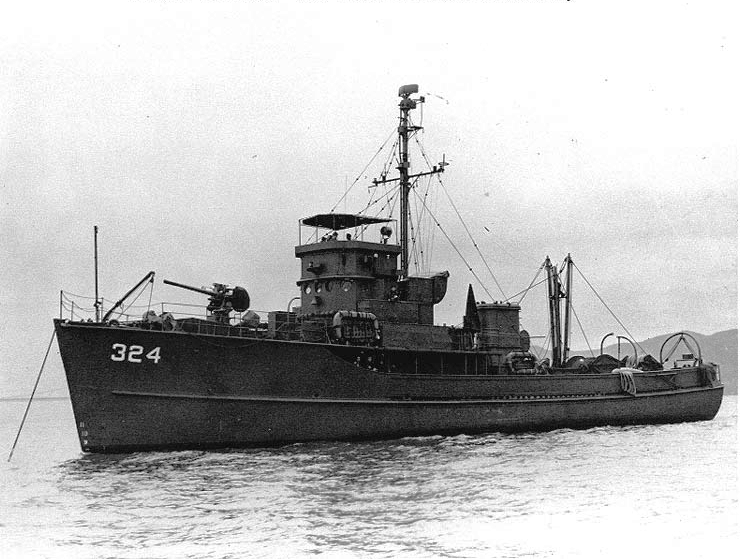
- A YMS-1-class minesweeper

History

United States
- Ordered: as YMS-45
- Laid down: 20 June 1941
- Launched: 20 April 1942
- Commissioned: 8 June 1942
- Decommissioned: 5 August 1946
- In service: 21 November 1950
- Out of service: 17 June 1955
- Stricken: 1 November 1960
- Fate: Believed to have been scrapped

General characteristics
- Displacement: 320 tons
- Length: 136 ft (41 m)
- Beam: 24 ft 6 in (7.47 m)
- Draught: 6 ft 1 in (1.85 m)
- Speed: 13 knots
- Complement: 33
- Armament: one 3 in (76 mm) gun mount, two 20 mm machine guns

USS Barbet (AMS-41/YMS-45) was a YMS-1-class auxiliary motor minesweeper of the U.S. Navy. YMS 45 was laid down on 20 June 1941 at Brooklyn, New York, by the Wheeler Shipbuilding Corp.; launched on 20 April 1942; and commissioned on 8 June 1942.

== World War II service ==
After trials and outfitting, the motor minesweeper reported for duty to the Commander, Eastern Sea Frontier. On 31 August, she departed Norfolk, Virginia, in company with YMS-44, bound for Bermuda. The ship operated as an escort vessel in the West Indies through the end of the war in Europe. She was based at Bermuda until 4 October 1943 when she and YMS 44 moved to Guantánamo Bay, Cuba. On 6 June 1945, YMS-45 headed for Hampton Roads, Virginia, and arrived at Norfolk on the 11th.

=== Transfer to Pacific Fleet ===
She stood out to sea again on 18 July as an element of Task Unit (TU) 29.01, bound for the Pacific Ocean. The motor minesweeper transited the Panama Canal between 29 July and 1 August and reached San Pedro, California, on 13 August. From that port, she shifted south to San Diego, California, where she remained for seven weeks.

=== End-of-war operations ===
On 1 October, YMS-45 put to sea and shaped a course for Oahu. The warship entered Pearl Harbor on the 13th and operated in Hawaiian waters until 1 December when, in company with four other motor minesweepers, she got underway for the Ryukyu Islands. She and her colleagues arrived in Buckner Bay, Okinawa, on 20 December and conducted minesweeping operations in those waters for about a month. After a three-week visit to Sasebo, Japan, in February 1946, the warship returned home via Pearl Harbor. She reached San Francisco, California, on 28 March and remained there until 13 June. On that day, the ship headed south with task unit TU 99.12.9. Steaming by way of San Diego, she arrived in the Panama Canal Zone on 28 June. She entered port at New York on 12 July and was decommissioned there on 5 August 1946.

== Naval Reserve training ship ==
The minesweeper remained in reserve until 13 January 1947 when she was placed in service as a school ship for reservists of the 3d Naval District. On 19 August 1947, YMS 45 was named Barbet and redesignated AMS 41.

== Reactivation during Korean War ==
On 11 May 1950, the warship was placed in commission, in reserve. On 21 November 1950, she was placed in full commission. The minesweeper continued to serve as a school ship for New York reservists until early in 1952 when she was reassigned to Mine Squadron (MinRon) 4 and to the Mine Countermeasures Station at Panama City, Florida. That duty, punctuated by repair periods at various locations along the U.S. East Coast, filled the remainder of her active career.

== Final decommissioning ==
Barbet was redesignated MSC0-41 on 7 February 1955; but, on 18 April 1955, she began inactivation preparations at Green Cove Springs, Florida. She was decommissioned at that port on 17 June 1955 and remained in reserve there for a little more than four years. Her name was struck from the Navy list on 1 November 1960. Details regarding her ultimate disposition are unavailable, but, presumably, she was scrapped.

== Military awards and honors ==
Barbet (AMS-41) earned one battle star as YMS-45 for her role in the postwar minesweeping performed off Okinawa and in Japanese waters.
