= USS Lark (AMS-23) =

Minesweeper of the United States Navy

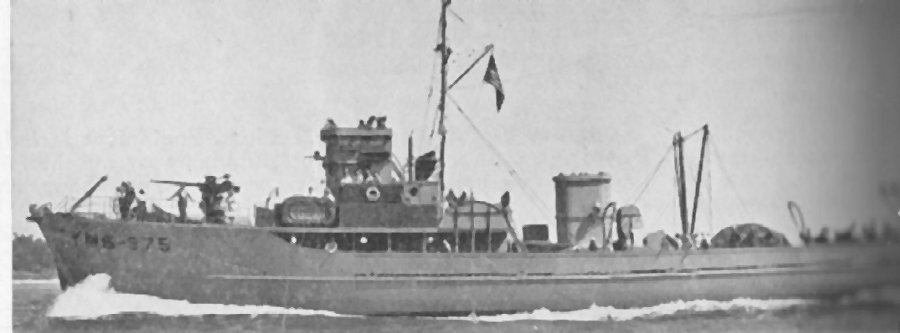

History

United States
- Name: USS YMS-376.
- Builder: Greenport Basin and Construction Co.; Greenport, New York
- Laid down: 5 January 1943
- Launched: 13 March 1943
- Commissioned: 10 August 1943
- Decommissioned: 5 June 1946
- Renamed: USS Lark (AMS-23), 17 February 1947
- Namesake: the lark bird
- Recommissioned: 8 November 1950
- Decommissioned: 13 November 1953
- Reclassified: MSC(O)-23 on 7 February 1955
- Home port: Long Beach, from 11 November 1951; Astoria, from 29 July 1952
- Honors and awards: 3 battle stars, World War II
- Fate: Transferred to Japan, 14 February 1959

History

Japan
- Name: JDS Ninoshima (MSC-662)
- Acquired: 14 February 1959
- Fate: Returned to U.S., 1967

General characteristics
- Class & type: YMS-135 subclass of YMS-1-class minesweepers
- Displacement: 270 tons
- Length: 136 ft (41 m)
- Beam: 25 ft (7.6 m)
- Draft: 8 ft (2.4 m)
- Propulsion: 2 × 880 bhp General Motors 8-268A diesel engines; 2 shafts
- Speed: 15 knots (28 km/h)
- Complement: 32
- Armament: 1 × 3"/50 caliber gun mount; 2 × 20 mm guns; 2 × depth charge tracks; 1 × depth charge projectors

USS Lark (YMS-376/AMS-23/MSC(O)-23) was a YMS-1-class minesweeper of the YMS-135 subclass built for the United States Navy during World War II.

== History ==
Lark, originally YMS-376, was laid down by Greenport Basin and Construction Co., Greenport, Long Island, New York, 5 January 1943; launched 13 March 1943; and commissioned at New York City 10 August 1943.

During the remainder of 1943 and throughout 1944, YMS-376 operated primarily at New York City where she swept the approaches and reaches of New York Harbor. In addition she participated in periodic coastal ASW operations which sent her along the eastern seaboard from New Jersey to Virginia and into Chesapeake Bay. Assigned to duty in the Pacific Ocean early in 1945, YMS-376 departed New York 16 March 1945 and arrived San Diego, California a month later.

She cleared the U.S. West Coast 28 April; and, after touching at Pearl Harbor, Johnston Island, and Eniwetok, reached Guam 24 May. She served in the Marianas until 26 June when, as a unit of MinRon 104, she arrived Okinawa to take part in the important but hazardous task of sweeping Japanese mines from the surrounding waters. She remained at Okinawa and engaged in this vital duty during the rest of the war.

Following the formal Surrender of Japan 2 September, YMS-376 steamed to Japan 8 to 10 September and began sweeping for coastal mines out of Sasebo. During the next 5 months she cleared mines from the coasts of Honshū and Kyūshū and in the Inland Sea. On 16 February 1946 she departed Kobe for the United States. Sailing via the Marshall Islands and Hawaiian Islands, she touched San Francisco, California 1 April and reached San Diego, California the 9th. YMS-376 decommissioned there 5 June 1946 and entered the Pacific Reserve Fleet. While in reserve at San Diego, she was named Lark and reclassified AMS-23 on 17 February 1947.

After the outbreak of the Korean War in the summer of 1950, Lark recommissioned at Alameda, California, 8 November 1950. Assigned to MinRon 5, she arrived San Diego 26 November and began minesweeping, ASW, and U.S. Naval Reserve training. She changed her homeport to Long Beach, California, 11 January 1951, and during the next year and a half continued type and readiness training along the California coast from Long Beach to San Francisco.

Lark departed Long Beach 6 July 1952 and, after touching at San Francisco, arrived Astoria, Oregon, 29 July.

She served there until 13 November 1953 when she decommissioned and entered the Pacific Reserve Fleet. She was reclassified MSC(O)-23 on 7 February 1955. She was transferred to Japan 14 February 1959 under the Military Assistance Program, serving the Japanese Maritime Self-Defense Force as Ninoshima (MSC-662) until struck in 1967.

YMS-376 received three battle stars for World War II service.
