= USS Turkey (AMS-56) =

Minesweeper of the United States Navy

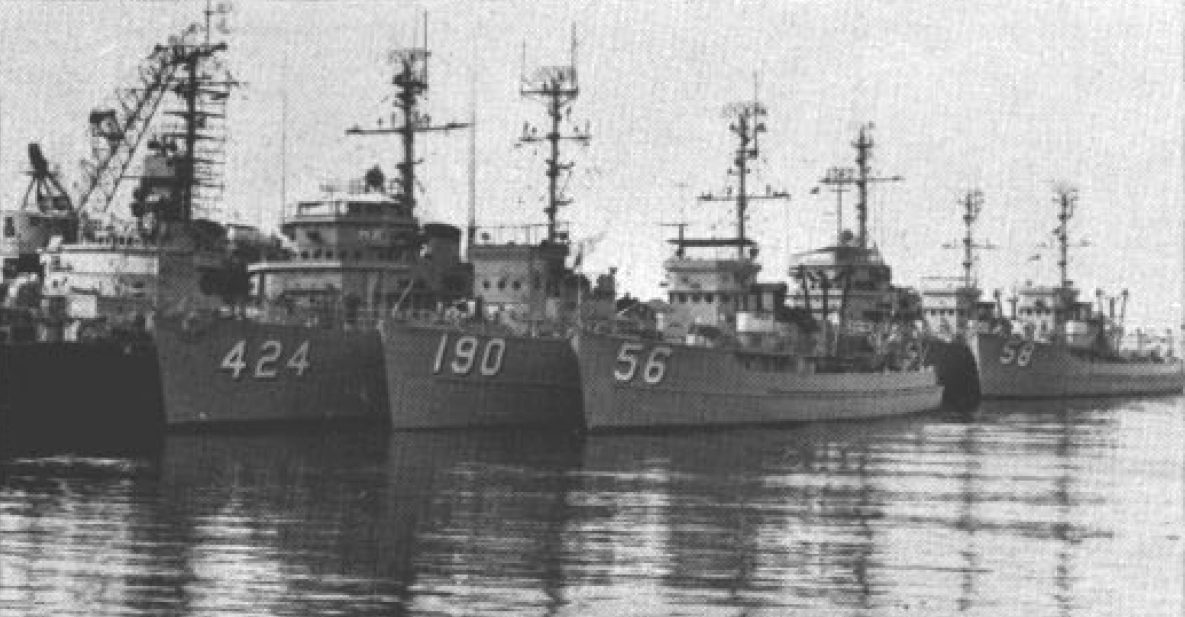
- Turkey with U.S. Mine Division 22, circa 1965

History

United States
- Name: USS YMS-444
- Builder: C. Hiltebrant Dry Dock Co., Inc.; Kingston, New York
- Laid down: 16 November 1943
- Launched: 20 July 1944
- Commissioned: 26 December 1944
- Decommissioned: 30 August 1946
- In service: 30 August 1946, Naval reserve training ship out of New York
- Renamed: USS Turkey (AMS-56), 1 September 1947
- Namesake: turkey
- Recommissioned: April 1950, in reserve
- Recommissioned: 21 November 1950, full
- Reclassified: MSC(O)-56, 7 February 1955
- Decommissioned: 23 November 1956
- In service: 27 May 1957, as Naval Reserve training ship out of Toledo (to 1960), and Fall River (from 1960)
- Out of service: September 1968
- Stricken: October 1968
- Fate: Sold August 1969; ultimate fate is unknown

General characteristics
- Class & type: YMS-135 subclass of YMS-1-class minesweepers
- Displacement: 320 tons
- Length: 136 ft (41 m)
- Beam: 24 ft 6 in (7.47 m)
- Draft: 8 ft (2.4 m) (mean)
- Propulsion: 2 × 880 bhp General Motors 8-268A diesel engines; 2 shafts
- Speed: 14 knots (26 km/h)
- Complement: 33
- Armament: 1 × 3"/50 caliber gun mount; 2 × 20 mm guns; 2 × depth charge projectors

USS Turkey (AMS-56/YMS-444) was a YMS-135 subclass of YMS-1-class minesweepers built for the United States Navy during World War II.

== History ==
Turkey was a coastal minesweeper of the United States Navy laid down as YMS-444 on 16 November 1943 at Kingston, New York, by C. Hiltebrant Dry Dock Co., Inc.; launched on 20 July 1944; and commissioned on 26 December 1944.

YMS-444 completed fitting out at New York and, in January 1945, made a shakedown voyage to Little Creek, Virginia. On 6 February, she arrived at Norfolk, Virginia, and remained there while members of her crew attended Fire Fighting School. Then, late in February, she returned to New York. In March, the auxiliary motor minesweeper began operating out of Tompkinsville, New York.

On 20 July, she departed New York and, after a stop at Miami, Florida, steamed through the Panama Canal to the California coast, arriving at Los Angeles, California on 8 September. On the 17th, she set her course westward for Pearl Harbor and the Marshalls. Although the war was over when YMS-444 arrived in the Pacific Ocean, there were still enormous tasks left for the minesweepers. YMS-444 pursued her duties operating out of Saipan and Eniwetok in October 1945. In November, she moved on to the Ryūkyūs and Japan, sweeping mines in the Kyūshū-Korea and Honshū areas, and remained in Japanese waters into the new year.

On 24 February 1946, she departed Kure and set her course, via the Marianas and Marshalls, for Pearl Harbor and California. After pausing at San Pedro, California, in April, she got underway for the Panama Canal Zone on the 27th. It was 6 June before she departed the Canal Zone and set her course, via Charleston, for New York City. She was decommissioned on 30 August 1946 and remained in the 3rd Naval District as a U.S. Naval Reserve training ship.

For the next six years, YMS-444 operated out of New York ports and on the Great Lakes. During part of this period she was docked at the USNR Station Fall River.On 1 September 1947, she was named USS Turkey and redesignated a motor minesweeper, AMS-56. She was placed in commission, in reserve, in April 1950, and she returned to active status on 21 November.

Turkey returned to the Atlantic Ocean in March 1952 and was assigned to serve with the Mine Forces, Atlantic Fleet, in August. During the following four years, she operated out of U.S. East Coast ports with occasional voyages to the Caribbean. On 7 February 1955, she was reclassified an old coastal minesweeper MSC(O)-56.

She arrived at Charleston on 9 November 1956 and was decommissioned there on 23 November 1956. Then, on 1 May 1957, she departed Charleston, steamed via New York, Halifax, and Montreal, and reported to the Commander, 4th Naval District, Toledo, Ohio, on 27 May 1957.

In 1960, Turkey was transferred to the 1st Naval District to continue as a Reserve training ship. As such, she operated out of Fall River, Massachusetts, until September 1968 when she was replaced as a training ship by USS Jacana (MSC-193). Her name was struck from the Naval Vessel Register as of October 1968, and she was sold in August 1969.

Her ultimate fate is unknown.
