= USS YMS-328 =

Minesweeper of the United States Navy

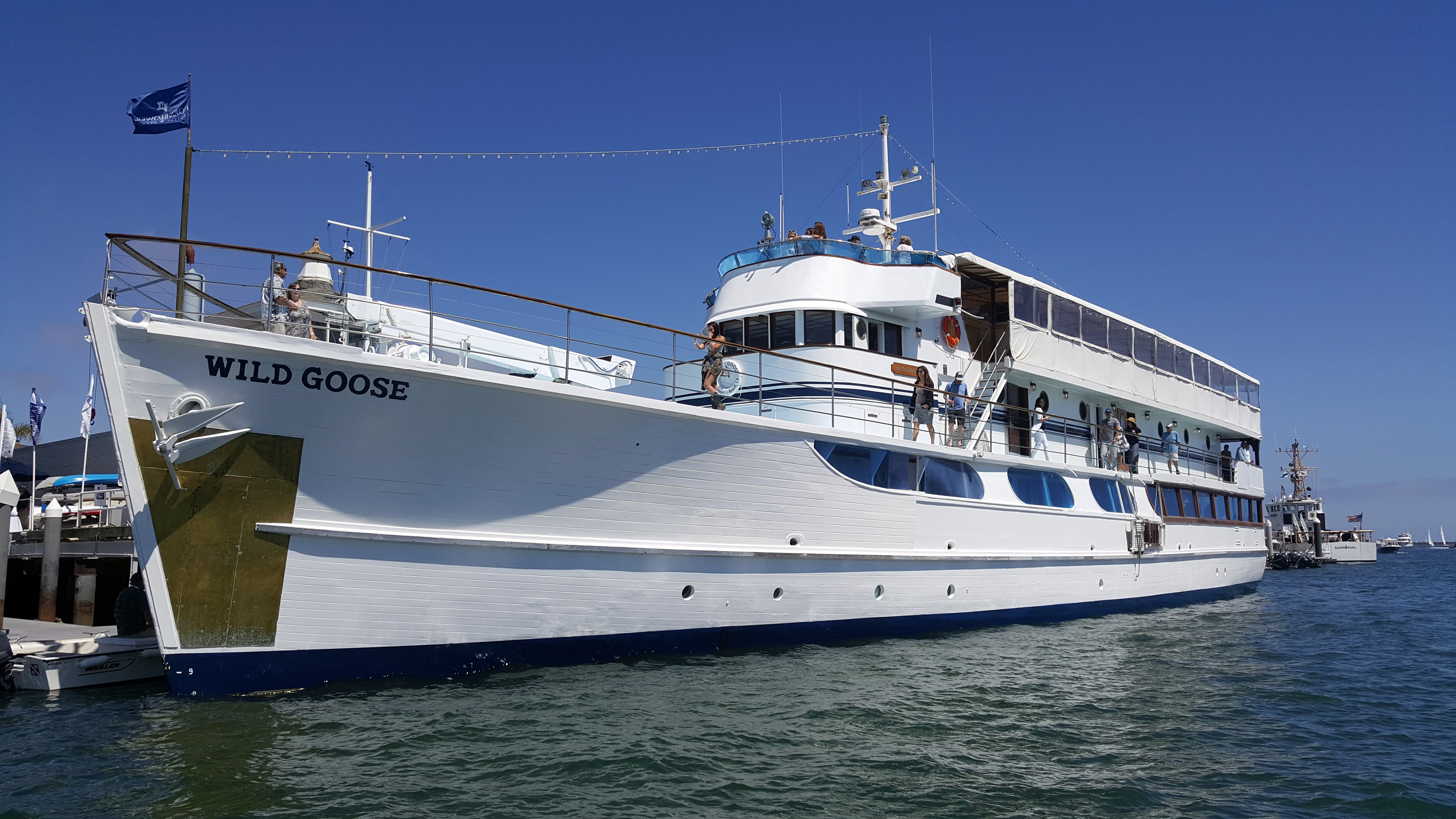

History

United States
- Name: YMS-328 (1943–1948); La Beverie (1948–1956); Wild Goose II (1956–1962); Wild Goose (1962–present)
- Owner: US Navy (1943–1948); Harold Jones (1948–1956); Max Wyman (1956–1962); John Wayne (1962–1979); Lynn Hutchins (1979–1986); City of L.A. (1986–1989); Deil Gustafson (1989–1996); Hornblower Cruises (1996–present)
- Builder: Ballard Marine Railway Co., Seattle, Washington
- Laid down: 6 July 1942
- Launched: 19 December 1942
- Completed: 26 May 1943
- Decommissioned: 29 October 1946
- Stricken: 29 October 1946
- Home port: Newport Beach, California
- Status: Operated as a cruise yacht

General characteristics
- Class & type: YMS-1-class minesweeper (YMS-135 subclass)
- Displacement: 270 long tons (274 t)
- Length: 136 ft (41 m)
- Beam: 24 ft 6 in (7.47 m)
- Draft: 8 ft (2.4 m)
- Propulsion: 2 × 880 bhp (656 kW) General Motors 8-268A diesel engines; Snow and Knobstedt single reduction gear; 2 shafts
- Speed: 15 knots (28 km/h; 17 mph)
- Complement: 32
- Armament: 1 × 3-inch/50-caliber gun; 2 × 20 mm guns; 2 × Depth charge projectors
- Wild Goose (yacht)
- U.S. National Register of Historic Places
- Location within California
- Location: 2431 West Coast Highway (boat berth), Newport Beach, California
- Coordinates: 33°37′9″N 117°55′19″W
- NRHP reference No.: 11000431
- Added to NRHP: 19 July 2011

USS YMS-328 is a decommissioned US Navy YMS-1-class (YMS-135 subclass) Yard Mine Sweeper (YMS), built in Ballard, Washington (Seattle) at Ballard Marine & Railway. She was classified as a Mark II design and her hull is constructed completely out of 3" vertical grain Douglas fir. Sister ships include Jacques Cousteau's RV Calypso. After serving in the Navy in World War II the boat was converted to a private yacht.

== US Navy history ==
YMS-328 was delivered on 26 May 1943. She served in the Aleutian Islands during World War II, sweeping enemy minefields at Attu and US minefields at Kiska, and patrolling out of Adak.

She was en route to Dutch Harbor to be fitted for the invasion of Paramishiru Island in Japan, when Japan surrendered. YMS-328 returned to Bremerton, Washington.

She was stricken from the Naval Vessel Register in 1946.

== Private ownership ==
YMS-328 was sold privately in 1948 to Vancouver Tug & Barge owner Harold Jones. He named her La Beverie. Upon Jones's death in 1956, millionaire Max Wyman purchased the yacht and renamed her the Wild Goose II. Wyman traveled the world on the yacht including Tahiti, Bora Bora, and Hawaii. In 1962, she was bought by John Wayne and went through a major renovation. Wayne changed her name to Wild Goose. He kept the ship for the last 17 years of his life. He entertained a presidential who's who of the time including Lyndon B. Johnson, Richard Nixon and Ronald Reagan.

The Wild Goose seen in 1962 before its major renovation, by Arthur Beaumont

Wild Goose was featured in the 1968 film Skidoo where she was the yacht, named Mother, of a reclusive mob boss named "God" played by Groucho Marx. The yacht was used extensively with scenes shot from the exterior and in the wheelhouse, cabins, engine room, upper and lower decks. This ship was also featured in the 1967 film The President's Analyst, doubling as a Canadian spy ship.

The travels of the ship were well documented during Wayne's ownership in the 1993 book On Board with the Duke authored by his former captain Bert Minshall. Minshall was on Wild Goose for 16 years with Wayne.

== Recent history ==
The vessel is still in operation for dinner cruises in Newport Beach, California by Hornblower Cruises. It was listed on the US National Register of Historic Places on 19 July 2011.
