= USS Firecrest (AMS-10) =

Minesweeper of the United States Navy

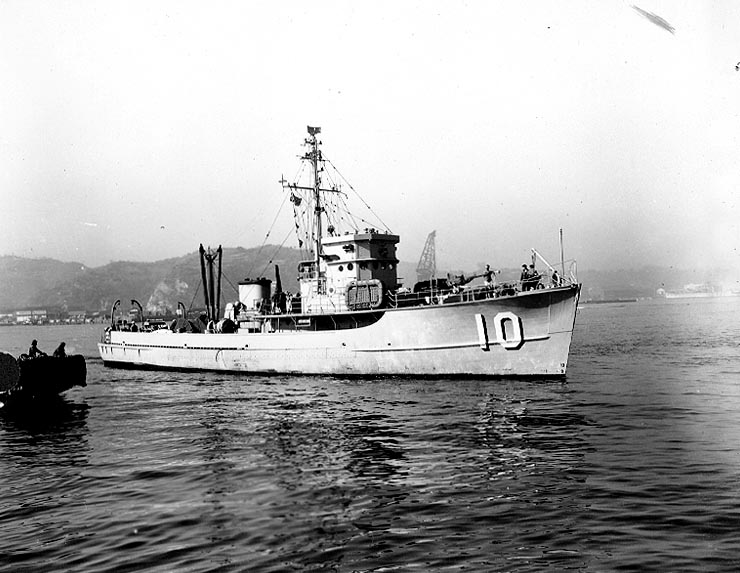
- USS Firecrest (AMS-10) In a Japanese port, 3 September 1952.

History

United States
- Laid down: 5 October 1942
- Launched: 3 April 1943
- Commissioned: 6 August 1943
- Decommissioned: February 1947
- In service: date unknown
- Out of service: date unknown
- Stricken: 31 March 1967
- Fate: Disposed of as a target in August 1969

History

Japan
- Name: JDS Etajima (MSC-656)
- Acquired: 15 March 1955
- Fate: returned to U.S., early 1967

General characteristics
- Displacement: 270 tons
- Length: 136 ft (41 m)
- Beam: 24 ft 6 in (7.47 m)
- Draught: 8 ft (2.4 m)
- Propulsion: two General Motors diesel engines, two shafts
- Speed: 15 kts
- Complement: 32
- Armament: one single 3 in (76 mm) gun mount, two 20 mm, two dcp

USS Firecrest (AMS-10/YMS-231) was an YMS-1-class minesweeper of the YMS-135 subclass acquired by the U.S. Navy for clearing coastal minefields during World War II.

Firecrest was laid down 5 October 1942 by Frank L. Sample, Jr., Boothbay Harbor, Maine; launched, 3 April 1943; completed and commissioned USS YMS-231, 6 August 1943.

She was decommissioned in February 1947; named Firecrest and reclassified as a Motor minesweeper, AMS-10, 18 February 1947.

Firecrest returned to service in the later 1940s. She was sent to Korea in 1950 and operated in the combat zone until the shooting ended in July 1953. Firecrest continued to serve in the Far East after the war. She was reclassified as a Coastal minesweeper, Old, MSC(O)-10, 7 February 1955.

Firecrest was transferred to Japan, 15 March 1955 as Etajima (MSC-656). She was returned to U. S. custody in 1967 and struck from the Naval Register, 31 March 1967. Firecrest was disposed of as a target in August 1969.
