= USS Flamingo (AMS-11) =

Minesweeper of the United States Navy

History

United States
- Name: USS YMS-238
- Builder: Stadium Yacht Basin, Inc.; Cleveland, Ohio
- Laid down: 11 May 1942
- Launched: 12 September 1942
- Acquired: 23 November 1942
- Commissioned: 23 November 1942
- Renamed: USS Flamingo (AMS-11), 18 February 1947
- Namesake: the flamingo bird
- Reclassified: MSC(O)-11, 7 February 1955
- Stricken: 1 November 1959
- Fate: Unknown

General characteristics
- Class & type: YMS-135 subclass of YMS-1-class minesweepers
- Displacement: 270 tons
- Length: 136 ft (41 m)
- Beam: 24 ft 6 in (7.47 m)
- Draft: 8 ft (2.4 m)
- Propulsion: 2 × 880 bhp General Motors 8-268A diesel engines; 2 shafts
- Speed: 15 knots (28 km/h)
- Complement: 32
- Armament: 1 × 3"/50 caliber dual purpose gun mount; 2 × 20 mm guns; 2 × depth charge projectors

USS Flamingo (MSC(O)-11/AMS-11/YMS-238) was a YMS-1-class minesweeper of the YMS-135 subclass built for the United States Navy during World War II. She was the third U.S. Navy ship to be named for the flamingo.

== History ==
Flamingo was laid down as YMS-238 on 11 May 1942 by Stadium Yacht Basin, Inc. of Cleveland, Ohio; launched, 12 September 1942; completed and commissioned on 23 November 1942.

On 10 November 1944, YMS-238 was damaged when ammunition ship Mount Hood exploded in Seeadler Harbor at Manus Island.

YMS-238 was renamed and reclassified as USS Flamingo (AMS-11) on 18 February 1947. She was further reclassified as MSC(O)-11 on 7 February 1955.

Flamingo was struck from the Naval Vessel Register on 1 November 1959. Her fate is unknown.
