= USS Curlew (AMS-8) =

Minesweeper of the United States Navy

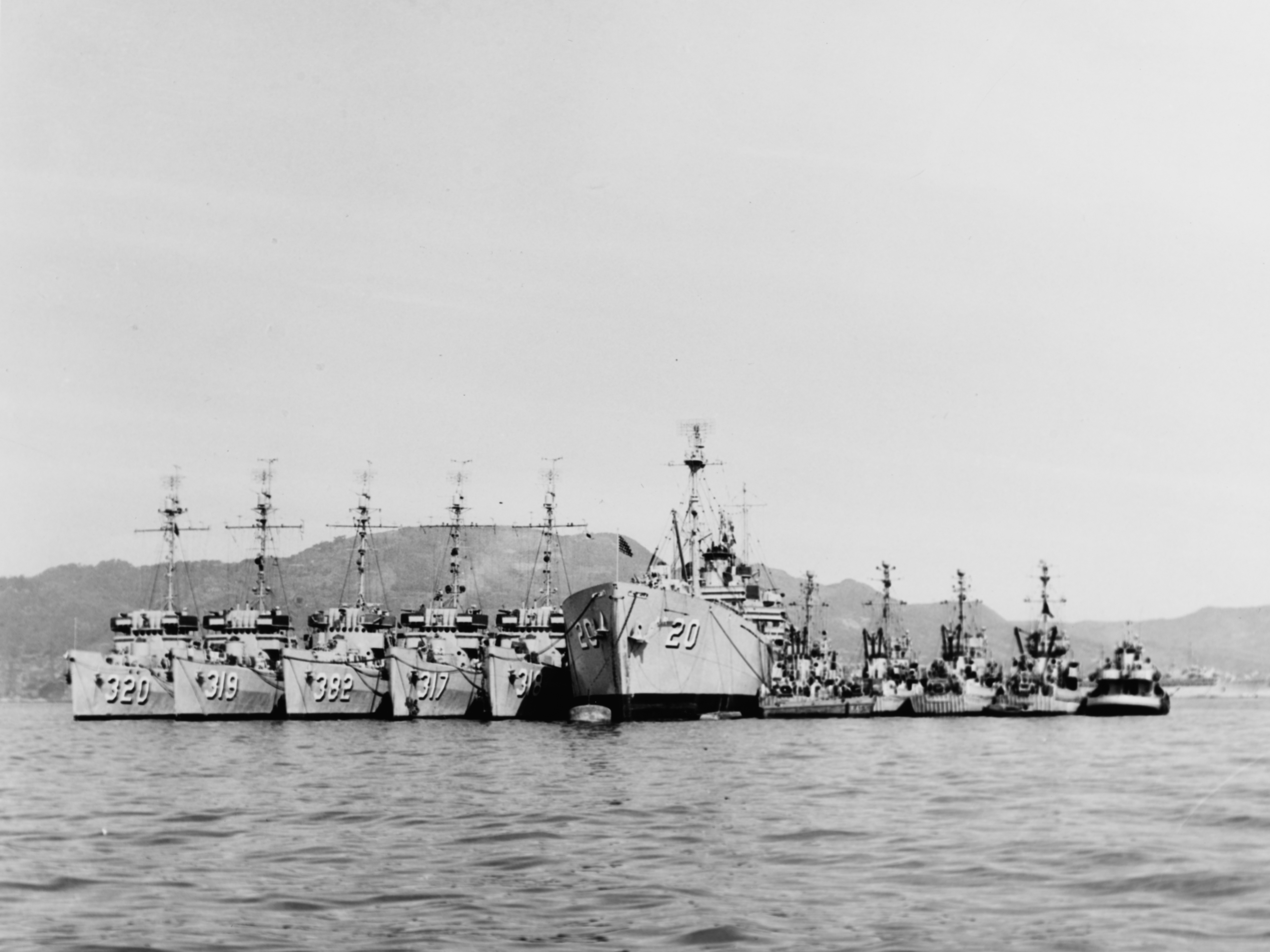
- Laertes (AR-20) is flanked on her port by five minesweepers and on her starboard by five motor minesweepers at Sasebo, Japan, in 1952. USS Curlew (AMS-8) is the middle ship of the second group.

History

United States
- Name: USS YMS-218
- Builder: J. N. Martinac Shipbuilding Co.; Tacoma, Washington
- Laid down: 18 July 1942
- Launched: 23 December 1942
- Completed: 23 June 1943
- Commissioned: 23 June 1943
- Decommissioned: early 1947
- Renamed: USS Curlew (AMS-8), 18 February 1947
- Namesake: the curlew bird
- Recommissioned: June 1949
- Reclassified: MSC(O)-8, 7 February 1955
- Motto: Where the fleet goes, we've been!
- Fate: Transferred to South Korea, 6 January 1956

South Korea
- Name: ROKS Geumhwa (MSC 519)
- Acquired: 6 January 1956

United States
- Name: USS Curlew (MSC(O)-8)
- Stricken: 15 November 1974
- Fate: disposed, c. 1977

General characteristics
- Class & type: YMS-135 subclass of YMS-1-class minesweepers
- Displacement: 270 t.
- Length: 136 ft (41 m)
- Beam: 24 ft 6 in (7.47 m)
- Draft: 8 ft (2.4 m)
- Propulsion: Two 880bhp General Motors 8-268A diesel engines; Snow and Knobstedt single reduction gear; two shafts.
- Speed: 15 knots (28 km/h)
- Complement: 32
- Armament: 1 × 3"/50 caliber dual purpose gun mount; 2 × 20 mm guns; 2 × depth charge projectors

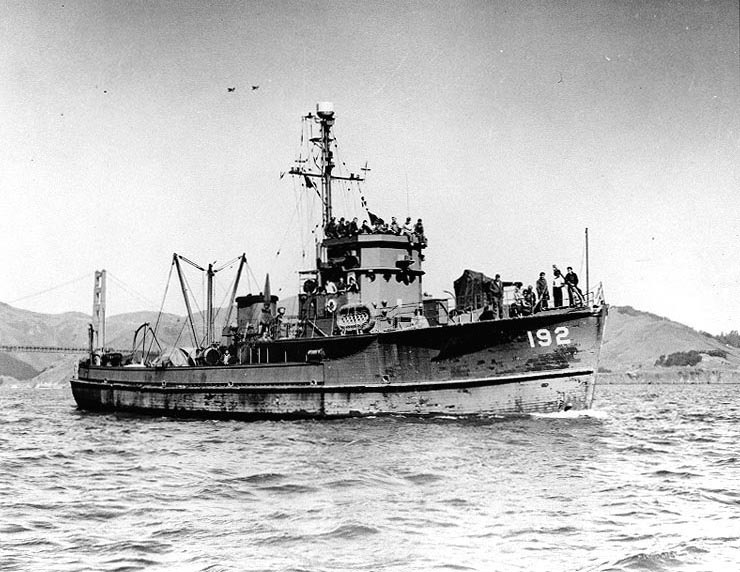
Ship caption=A YMS-1-class minesweeper

USS Curlew (MSC(O)-8/AMS-8/YMS-218) was a YMS-1-class minesweeper of the YMS-135 subclass built for the United States Navy during World War II. She was the fourth U.S. Navy ship to be named for the curlew.

== History ==
Laid down, 18 July 1942 by the J. N. Martinac Shipbuilding Co. of Tacoma, Washington; Launched, 23 December 1942; Completed and commissioned USS YMS-218, 23 June 1943.

She served in the Asiatic-Pacific Theater during World War II, and took part in occupation activities in late 1945 and early 1946.

In early 1947, after returning to the U.S. West Coast, she was placed out of commission. YMS-218 was reclassified as a Motor Minesweeper, AMS-8 and named USS Curlew, 18 February 1947. Curlew recommissioned in June 1949.

Curlew was sent to the Western Pacific a year later to support Korean War operations. During most of that conflict, she was active in the combat zone, performing mine clearance and blockade missions. Curlew remained in the Japan-Korea area after the war ended in mid-1953. She was redesignated a Coastal Minesweeper (Old), MSC(O)-8, 7 February 1955.

Curlew was transferred to South Korea on 6 January 1956 as ROKS Geumhwa (MSC 519). Returned from South Korea, the veteran minesweeper was struck from the Naval Vessel Register on 15 November 1974, and was disposed of about 1977.
