= USS Waxbill (MHC-50) =

Minesweeper of the United States Navy

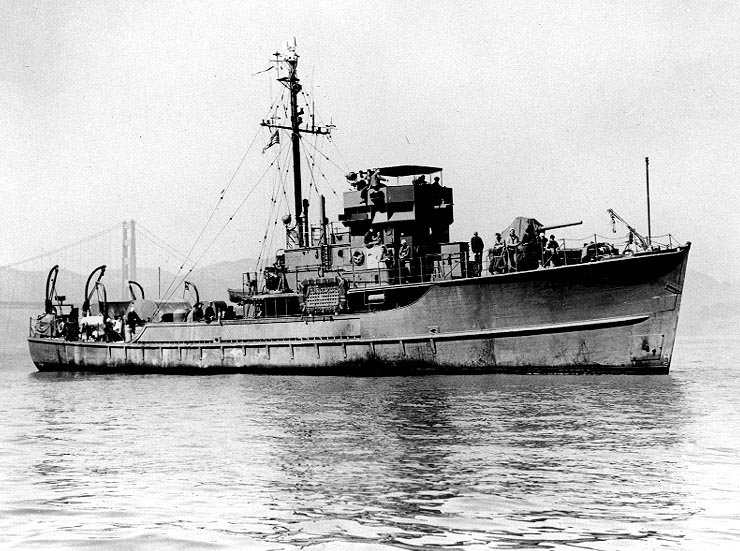

History

United States
- Name: USS YMS-479
- Builder: Mojean and Ericson Shipbuilding Corp.; Tacoma, Washington
- Laid down: 28 April 1943 as PCS-1456
- Reclassified: YMS-479, 27 September 1943
- Launched: 30 September 1943
- Commissioned: 20 July 1944
- Decommissioned: 6 August 1946
- Renamed: USS Waxbill (AMS-39), 18 February 1947
- In service: 19 January 1949, Naval Reserve training vessel, Seattle, Washington
- Recommissioned: 1 September 1950, in reserve
- Recommissioned: 25 September 1950, full
- Reclassified: AMCU-50, 1 February 1955; MHC-50, 7 February 1955
- Recommissioned: 1 May 1958, in reserve
- Decommissioned: 30 June 1958
- Stricken: 1 November 1959
- Honors and awards: 6 battle stars, Korean War; Korean Presidential Unit Citation
- Fate: Unknown

General characteristics
- Class & type: YMS-446 subclass of YMS-1-class minesweepers
- Displacement: 320 tons
- Length: 136 ft 0 in (41.45 m)
- Beam: 24 ft 6 in (7.47 m)
- Draft: 6 ft 1 in (1.85 m) (max.)
- Propulsion: 2 × 880 bhp General Motors 8-268A diesel engines; 2 shafts
- Speed: 12 knots (22 km/h)
- Complement: 32
- Armament: 1 × 3"/50 caliber gun mount; 2 × 20 mm guns; 2 × depth charge projectors

USS Waxbill (MHC-50/AMCU-50/AMS-39/YMS-479/PCS-1456) was a YMS-1-class minesweeper of the YMS-446 subclass acquired by the U.S. Navy for the task of removing mines placed in the water to prevent ships from passing.

== History ==
The second U.S. Navy ship named for the waxbill bird, the ship was originally the wooden-hulled, unnamed motor minesweeper YMS-479. Laid down as PCS-1456 on 28 April 1943 at Tacoma, Washington, by the Mojean and Ericson Shipbuilding Corp., the ship was reclassified as a motor minesweeper, YMS-479, on 27 September 1943. Launched on 30 September 1943, YMS-479 was commissioned at the Mojean and Ericson yard on 20 July 1944.

After fitting out at the Todd Pacific Shipyard, Tacoma, Washington, the new minecraft departed the Seattle, Washington, area on 13 August. Making port at Long Beach, California, on 17 August, she conducted shakedown out of that port until 8 September, when she shifted to San Diego, California, for training in antisubmarine warfare tactics. She departed San Diego on 25 September, when she sailed with YMS-59 as screen for tank landing ships LST-627, LST-1030, and LST-926, bound for the Hawaiian Islands.

After arriving at the Section Base, Pearl Harbor, on 6 October, YMS-479 had begun patrolling off Kauai by the end of the month. She operated in the Hawaiian chain through February 1945, providing local escort services for ships conducting maneuvers and exercises off Maui, Kauai, or Oahu, ranging from attack transports to LSTs. During that time, she also carried out patrols and periodically tested her sweep gear.

Assigned to the United States Pacific Fleet on 6 March, the motor minesweeper departed Pearl Harbor on 23 March, bound for the Marshall Islands. She subsequently operated out of Eniwetok, Kwajalein, and Majuro through the end of the Pacific War in mid-August 1945.

Departing Kwajalein on 10 December, YMS-479 arrived at Pearl Harbor on Christmas Day and subsequently operated in the Hawaiian Islands into 1946. Departing Pearl Harbor on 20 February in company with USS Sheldrake (AM-62), YMS-479 arrived at San Francisco, California, on 1 March and began preparations for inactivation. YMS-479 was accordingly decommissioned on 6 August 1946 and was placed in the San Diego group of the Reserve Fleet.

Named USS Waxbill and reclassified as AMS-39 on 18 February 1947 while still in reserve, the minecraft was taken out of "mothballs" on 5 January 1949; and work began to ready her to resume duty. On 19 January, Waxbill was placed "in service" and, within a week, she was assigned to the 13th Naval District. She served as a U.S. Naval Reserve training ship, attached to the Navy and Marine Corps Training Center at Seattle, Washington, where she served through the spring of 1950.

With the onset of the Korean War in June and consequent American support for the United Nations intervention to aid the embattled South Koreans, the Navy expanded accordingly. Waxbill was recommissioned, albeit "in reserve," on 1 September 1950. Ultimately, she was placed in full commission on 25 September.

Duty in the inhospitable Korean waters soon beckoned Waxbill. The minecraft departed San Diego, California, on 27 February 1951, bound for the Far East. After stopovers at Pearl Harbor and the Japanese ports of Sasebo and Yokosuka, Japan, Waxbill commenced her tour of Korean War service on 12 May in operation area "S". She participated in combat minesweeping operations off Wonsan, Pusan, Inchon, Kyoshin Tan, and To Jang Po into 1953. Her operations took her to both coasts of the Korean peninsula—east and west—and she swept over 40 mines, earning the Korean Presidential Unit Citation for her often hazardous and unsung mine-sweeping chores. During that time, she operated out of Sasebo and, in between deployments to Korean waters, visited such Japanese ports as Kobe, Nagasaki, Yokosuka, Moji, and Fukuoka.

Waxbill remained in the Far East even after hostilities in Korea ceased. She was reclassified as coastal minehunter AMCU-50 on 1 February 1955, and, only six days later, again reclassified MHC-50. After her conversion to a coastal minehunter, she departed Yokosuka, Japan, on 10 August, bound for the United States.

Sailing via Midway Island, Pearl Harbor, and Long Beach, California, Waxbill made port at San Francisco, California, on 8 September. She operated off the coast of southern California into 1958, visiting, in the course of that deployment, such ports as Santa Cruz, San Francisco, and San Diego.

Placed "in commission, in reserve," status on 1 May 1958, Waxbill was placed in the Stockton, California, group of the Pacific Reserve Fleet, on 16 May, and was ultimately placed out of commission, in reserve, on 30 June 1958.

While exact details of the ship's ultimate fate are lacking, it is known that Waxbill was struck from the Navy list on 1 November 1959.

== Awards and honors ==
Waxbill received six battle stars and was awarded the Presidential Unit Citation for Korean War service.
