= USS Swallow (AMS-36) =

Minesweeper of the United States Navy

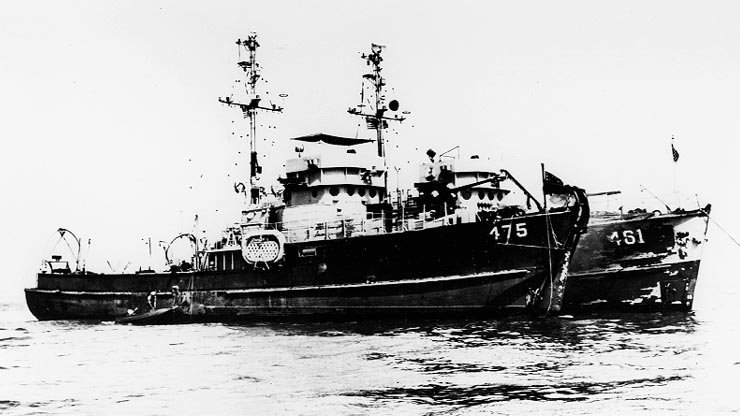

History

United States
- Name: USS YMS-461
- Builder: Stadium Yacht Basin, Inc., Cleveland, Ohio
- Laid down: 8 June 1943 as PCS-1416
- Launched: 8 January 1944
- Completed: 21 June 1944
- Commissioned: 22 June 1944
- Renamed: Swallow (AMS-36), 18 February 1947
- Namesake: the swallow
- Reclassified: MSC(O)-36, 7 February 1955
- Decommissioned: 16 April 1955
- Honors and awards: 3 battle stars, World War II
- Fate: Lent to Japan, 16 April 1955
- Acquired: returned from Japan, 1 May 1968
- Stricken: 1 May 1968
- Fate: Sold for scrapping, 5 September 1969

History

Japan
- Name: JDS Yugeshima (MSC-660)
- Acquired: 16 April 1955
- Reclassified: YAS-41
- Fate: Returned to U.S., 1 May 1968

General characteristics
- Displacement: 251 tons (lt.)
- Length: 136 ft (41.5 m)
- Beam: 24 ft 6 in (7.47 m)
- Draft: 10 ft (3.0 m)
- Propulsion: 2 × 880 bhp General Motors 8-268A diesel engines; 2 shafts
- Speed: 12 knots (22 km/h)
- Complement: 33
- Armament: 1 × 3"/50 caliber dual purpose gun mount; 2 × 20 mm guns; 2 × depth charge projectors

USS Swallow (MSC(O)-36/AMS-36/YMS-461) was a YMS-1-class minesweeper of the YMS-446 subclass built for the United States Navy during World War II. She was originally laid down as PCS-1416, and, when renamed later in her career, became the third U.S. Navy ship named for the swallow.

== History ==
Swallow was laid down as PCS-1416 on 8 June 1943 by Stadium Yacht Basin, Inc., of Cleveland, Ohio; redesignated YMS-461 on 27 September 1943; launched on 8 January 1944, and commissioned on 22 June 1944.

YMS-461 departed Cleveland on 3 July and sailed down the St. Lawrence River. She made stops at Montreal, Quebec, and Halifax, before arriving in Norfolk, Virginia, on 22 August. She completed shakedown training out of Norfolk on 2 September and began patrolling the U.S. East Coast under the command of the Commander Eastern Sea Frontier. She patrolled for enemy submarines and escorted coastal convoys until mid-March 1945.

On 17 March, she got underway from Norfolk and sailed south, stopping at Miami, Florida, and Guantanamo Bay, Cuba, before transiting the Panama Canal at the end of the first week in April. She stopped at San Diego, California, from 20 to 27 April, and at Pearl Harbor on 6 May, then continued on to the Central Pacific Ocean. After brief stops at Eniwetok and Guam, she arrived off Okinawa on 27 June and served there for almost two months.

Late in August, she moved to Tokyo Bay and, for the next few months, operated in that area. In February 1946, she returned to the Marianas, at Saipan, then continued east via Eniwetok to Pearl Harbor, where she arrived on 14 March. She reached San Francisco, California, on the 26th, remained there in overhaul until 20 October, and then shifted to San Diego. On 16 November, YMS-461 headed back to the Far East. She stopped at Pearl Harbor, Johnston Island, and Eniwetok Atoll, before entering Apra Harbor at Guam on 9 January 1947. On 18 February 1947, she was named Swallow and redesignated AMS-36.

Swallow served in the Far East, operating out of Yokosuka and Sasebo, Japan, for the remainder of her career which included minesweeping duties during the Korean War.

In October 1950, Swallow was part of a group consisting of Thompson (DMS-38), Carmick (DMS-33), Forrest Royal (DD-872), Catamount (LSD-17), Horace A. Bass (APD-124), Pelican (AMS-32), Gull (AMS-16), LST-Q-007, four Republic of Korea minesweepers, and a helicopter from Rochester (CA-124) that cleared the heavily mined port of Chinnampo in less than two weeks.

On 7 February 1955, she was redesignated MSC(O)-36. She was decommissioned on 16 April 1955 and loaned to Japan. She served the Japanese Maritime Self Defense Force as Yugeshima (MSC-660) and was later redesignated YAS-41.

On 1 May 1968 she was returned to the custody of the United States Navy; and her name was struck from the Naval Vessel Register on the same day. Her hulk was sold to Kitajima Choke Co., of Sasebo, Japan, on 5 September 1969, for scrapping.

== Awards and honors ==
YMS-461 earned three battle stars for World War II service.
