= USS Crossbill (AMS-45) =

Minesweeper of the United States Navy

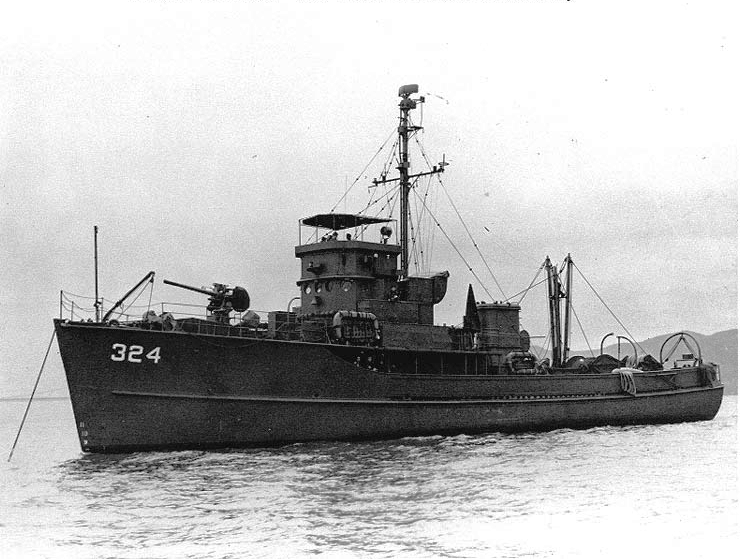
- A YMS-1-class minesweeper

History

United States
- Name: USS YMS-120
- Builder: Harbor Boat Building Co.; Terminal Island, California
- Laid down: 23 August 1941
- Launched: 4 April 1942
- Completed: 1 August 1942
- Reclassified: MSC(O)-45, 7 February 1955
- Stricken: 1 November 1959
- Fate: Unknown

General characteristics
- Class & type: YMS-1-class minesweeper
- Displacement: 270 tons
- Length: 136 ft (41 m)
- Beam: 24 ft 6 in (7.47 m)
- Draft: 8 ft (2.4 m)
- Propulsion: 2 × 880 bhp General Motors 8-268A diesel engines; 2 shafts
- Speed: 15 knots (28 km/h)
- Complement: 32
- Armament: 1 × 3"/50 caliber dual purpose gun mount; 2 × 20 mm guns; 2 × depth charge projectors

USS Crossbill (MSC(O)-45/AMS-45/YMS-120) was a YMS-1-class minesweeper built for the United States Navy during World War II. She was the second U.S. Navy ship to be named for the crossbill.

Crossbill was laid down as YMS-120 on 23 August 1941 by Harbor Boat Building Co. of Terminal Island, California; launched 4 April 1942 and completed on 1 August 1942.

YMS-120 was renamed and reclassified Crossbill (AMS-45) on 1 September 1947. Crossbill was reclassified as coastal minesweeper MSC(O)-45 on 7 February 1955, and was struck from the Naval Vessel Register on 1 November 1959. Her fate is unknown.
