= USS Lapwing (AMS-48) =

Minesweeper of the United States Navy

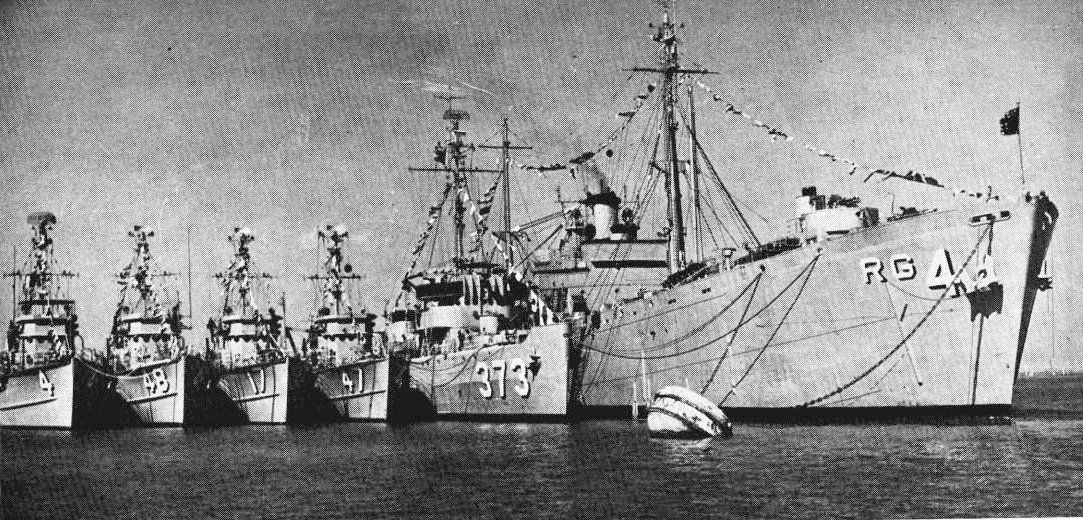
- Right to left: Tutuila (ARG 4), Peregrine (AM 373), Fulmar (AMS 47), Hawk (AMS 17), Lapwing, and Cardinal (AMS 4)

History

United States
- Name: USS YMS-268
- Builder: Kruse & Banks Shipbuilding Co.; North Bend, Oregon
- Laid down: 1 December 1942
- Launched: 15 April 1943
- Sponsored by: Mrs. J. H. Granger
- Commissioned: 31 July 1943
- Decommissioned: 1 November 1946
- In service: 1 November 1946, Naval Reserve training ship
- Renamed: USS Lapwing (AMS-48), 1 September 1947
- Namesake: Lapwing (Vanellus vanellus)
- Recommissioned: 12 February 1951
- Reclassified: MSC(O)-48 on 7 February 1955
- Decommissioned: 15 November 1957
- Stricken: 1 November 1959
- Identification: IMO number: 7309974
- Honors and awards: 1 battle star, World War II
- Fate: Sold for use as fishing boat; ultimate fate unknown

General characteristics
- Class & type: YMS-135 subclass of YMS-1-class minesweepers
- Displacement: 236 tons
- Length: 136 ft (41 m)
- Beam: 24 ft 6 in (7.47 m)
- Draft: 10 ft (3.0 m)
- Propulsion: 2 × 880 bhp General Motors 8-268A diesel engines; 2 shafts
- Speed: 15 knots (28 km/h)
- Complement: 32
- Armament: 1 × 3"/50 caliber gun mount; 2 × 20 mm guns; 2 × depth charge tracks; 1 × depth charge projectors

USS Lapwing (MSC(O)-48/AMS-48/YMS-268) was a YMS-1-class minesweeper of the YMS-135 subclass built for the United States Navy during World War II. She was named after the lapwing (Vanellus vanellus).

== History ==
YMS-268 was laid down 1 December 1942 by Kruse & Banks Shipbuilding Co., North Bend, Oregon; launched 15 April 1943; sponsored by Mrs. J. H. Granger; and commissioned 31 July 1943.

After shakedown along the west coast, YMS-268 trained minesweeper crews out of San Pedro, California, throughout most of the war, contributing to the war effort by increasing the efficiency of American minesweeping operations throughout the world.

Following 2 years of training operations, the minesweeper arrived Pearl Harbor 26 May 1945 for deployment to the western Pacific. Assigned to the U.S. 7th Fleet, YMS-268 operated out of Guam, the Philippines, and Okinawa from July to August. Following the surrender of Japan, she removed mines from Tokyo Bay and around the Island of Honshū.

Departing Kobe 9 March 1946, the veteran ship reached San Francisco, California 24 April. After 1 month on the west coast, YMS-268 steamed to the Great Lakes via the St. Lawrence River. Upon arriving at Chicago on 25 July, she was assigned to the 9th Naval District Reserve Training program. YMS-268 decommissioned and was placed in service 1 November 1946.

Reclassified AMS-48 and named Lapwing 1 September 1947, she continued operations in the Reserve Training program. Lapwing recommissioned 12 February 1951 at Orange, Texas. Arriving Charleston, South Carolina, 19 March, the minesweeper engaged in operations along the U.S. East Coast, developing new techniques in mine warfare until 1957. During this period she was reclassified MSC(O)-48 on 7 February 1955.

Lapwing decommissioned 15 November 1957 at New York City and entered the Atlantic Reserve Fleet. She was struck from the Naval Vessel Register 1 November 1959.

The veteran minesweeper was sold to Standard Products Co., Inc. of Kilmarnock, Virginia, who converted her to a menhaden fishing boat and renamed her Weems. In 1987 she was sold to Yale Iverson, a retired lawyer from Des Moines, Iowa, who renamed her Endeavor and converted her into a research/cargo vessel. The ship sank in the summer of 1990 off the coast of the Dominican Republic.

== Awards and honors ==
YMS-268 received one battle star for World War II service.
