= USS Parrakeet (AMS-30) =

Minesweeper of the United States Navy

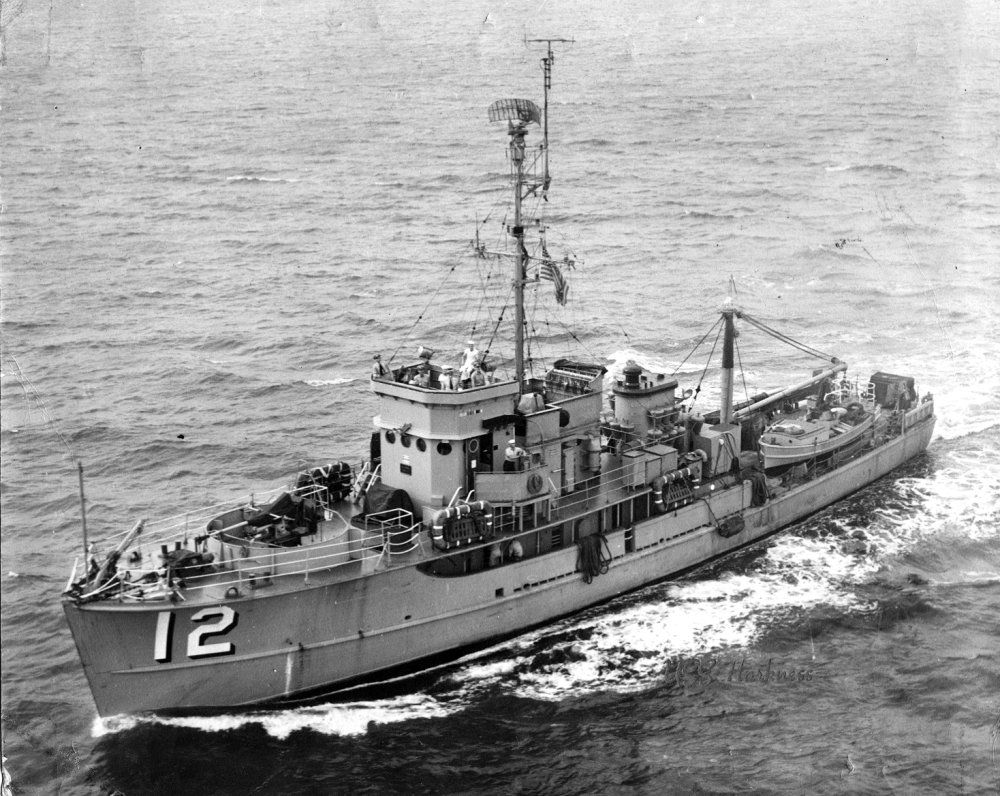
- A YMS-1-class minesweeper

History

United States
- Ordered: as YMS–434
- Laid down: 30 October 1943
- Launched: 10 May 1944
- Commissioned: 15 November 1944
- Decommissioned: 21 May 1947
- Stricken: 23 June 1947
- Fate: Declared a total loss after stranding

General characteristics
- Displacement: 350 tons
- Length: 136 ft (41 m)
- Beam: 24 ft 6 in (7.47 m)
- Draught: 6 ft 1 in (1.85 m)
- Speed: 12 knots
- Complement: 50
- Armament: one 3 in (76 mm) gun mount, two 20 mm machine guns

USS YMS-434 was a YMS-1-class minesweeper of the YMS-135 subclass built for the United States Navy during World War II. Shortly before decommissioning, she was renamed and redesignated Parrakeet (AMS-30), becoming the second U.S. Navy ship to be named for the parakeet using a variant spelling.

== History ==
YMS-434 was laid down on 30 October 1943 by J. M. Martinac Ship Building Corp. of Tacoma, Washington; launched 10 May 1944; sponsored by Miss Dorinda Rathbone; and commissioned 15 November 1944.

Upon completion of fitting out, YMS–434 was assigned to the U.S. Pacific Fleet and operated in the Aleutians and off the northwestern coast of the United States.

Reclassified AMS–30 and named Parrakeet on 18 February 1947, she decommissioned on 21 May 1947 at Puget Sound. Struck from the Naval Register 23 June 1947, she was sold on 9 October and was renamed Dan. She stranded in Queen Charlotte Sound, British Columbia, on 30 March 1949 and was declared a total loss.
