= USS Harkness (AMCU-12) =

Minesweeper of the United States Navy

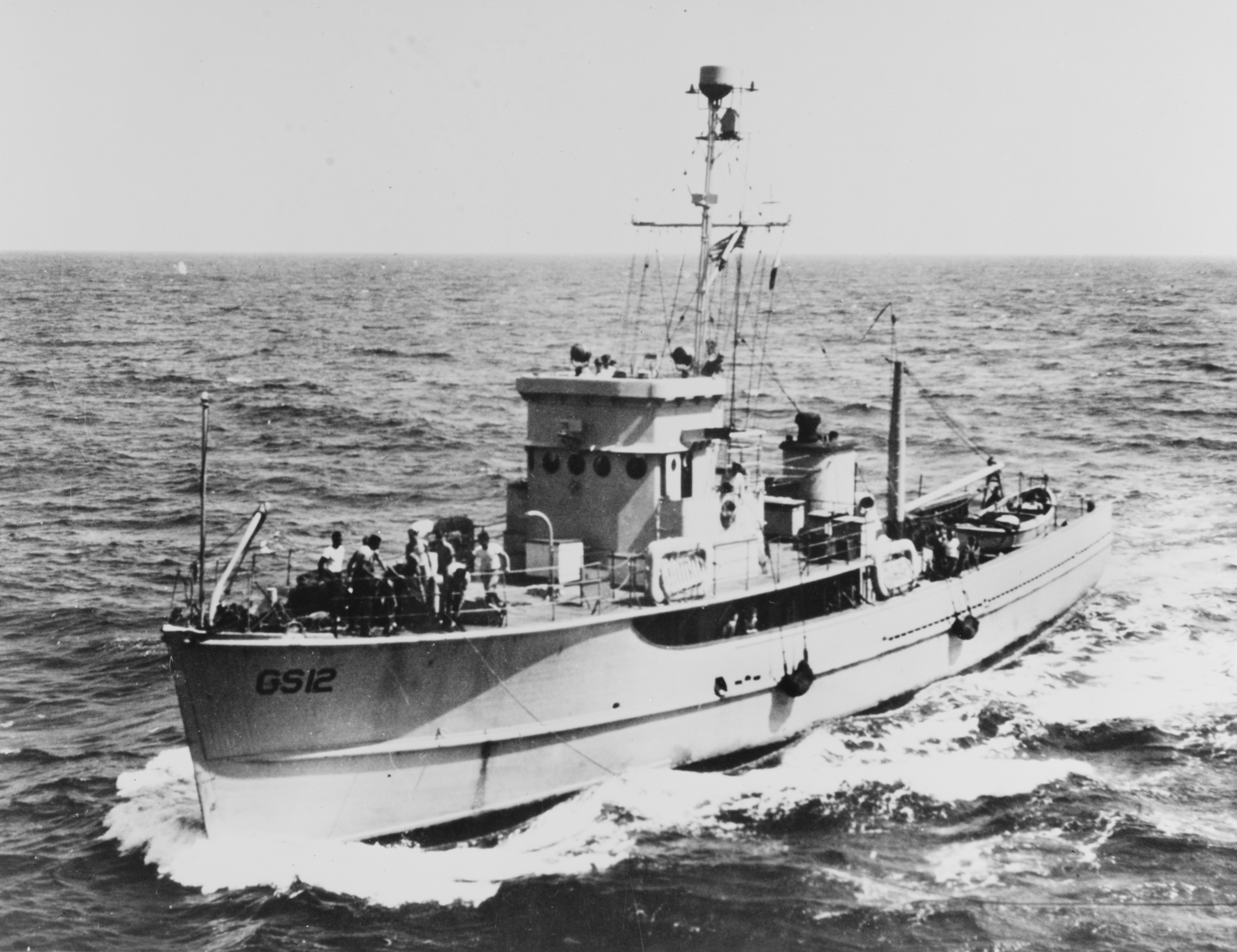
- USS Harkness circa 1946

History

United States
- Ordered: as YMS-242
- Builder: Tacoma Boatbuilding Company
- Laid down: 1 June 1942
- Launched: 10 October 1942
- Commissioned: 27 March 1943
- Decommissioned: 22 September 1950
- In service: 5 September 1951
- Out of service: 2 April 1958
- Stricken: 1 November 1959
- Fate: Sold, 1960; fate unknown

General characteristics
- Displacement: 245 tons
- Length: 186 ft (57 m)
- Beam: 23 ft 4 in (7.11 m)
- Draught: 8 ft 7 in (2.62 m)
- Speed: 14 knots
- Complement: 34
- Armament: one 3 in (76 mm) gun mount, two 20 mm machine guns, two depth charge racks, two depth charge tracks

USS Harkness (AMCU-12/YMS-242) was a YMS-1-class minesweeper of the YMS-135 subclass acquired by the U.S. Navy for the task of removing mines that had been placed in the water to prevent ships from passing.

Harkness was laid down as YMS-242 by Tacoma Boatbuilding Company, Tacoma, Washington, 1 June 1942; launched 10 October 1942; commissioned 27 March 1943.

== Operational history ==
=== World War II service ===
After shakedown along the California coast, YMS-242 departed San Diego, California, 20 August 1943 for duty in the Western Pacific Ocean. Steaming via Pearl Harbor, she conducted mine sweeping patrols in the Marshall and Solomon Islands throughout the next year. As American amphibious forces swept over the Mariannas, she swept for mines and made reconnaissance patrols during the summer and fall of 1944. Following the conquest of the Mariannas, she returned to Pearl Harbor 25 December before sailing to the U.S. West Coast for conversion to a surveying ship.

After conversion by South Coast Shipyard, Newport Beach, California, she was named Harkness in honor of Rear Admiral William Harkness and reclassified AGS-12 on 24 March 1945. The following month she returned to the Western Pacific where she conducted survey operations in the Marshalls and at Okinawa.

After the end of World War II, she sailed to Japanese waters for a month of survey work. She returned to Guam from Nagoya, Japan, 4 January 1946; then sailed 10 January for the United States via the Marshalls and Pearl Harbor, reaching San Diego 26 February. She sailed 29 March for the U.S. East Coast; touched at Acapulco, Mexico, Guantanamo Bay, Cuba, and Norfolk, Virginia; and arrived New York 8 May.

=== Reclassified as AGSC-12 ===
Following overhaul, Harkness departed 25 July for Miami, Florida, and arrived 29 July to reclassify as AGSC-12. For more than 3 years she operated out of Miami, participating in extensive ocean surveys from the Gulf of Mexico to the North Atlantic Ocean. During much of 1947 she patrolled the Mexican coast off Vera Cruz, Mexico. Harkness surveyed coastal waters off Labrador and Newfoundland from July to October 1948 and 1949; and survey work continued for the first 5 months of 1950 in the Caribbean between Trinidad and Venezuela. She returned to New York later in the year and decommissioned 22 September 1950.

=== Converted into a minehunter ===
Harkness was converted to a minehunter by Brooklyn Navy Yard; reclassified AMCU-12 on 18 August 1951; and recommissioned 5 September 1951. Assigned to the Atlantic Fleet Mine Force, she departed New York 2 July 1952 and arrived Norfolk, Virginia, the next day. The next year she steamed to Charleston, South Carolina, and Key West, Florida, and Panama City, Florida, while involved with training exercises and other operations. Assigned along the Atlantic Coast to the 5th Naval District in October 1953, Harkness again participated in training operations, primarily in the Virginia Capes Operation Area, finally steaming to Newport, Rhode Island, during June 1954 for channel clearance operations.

Reclassified MHC-12 on 1 February 1955, she continued her part in numerous mine clearing exercises, in July 1957 even operating in Cuban waters out of Guantánamo Bay and Havana, Cuba.

=== Decommissioning ===
Harkness departed Little Creek, Virginia, 30 January 1958 and arrived Green Cove Springs, Florida, via Jacksonville, Florida, 3 February. She decommissioned 2 April 1958 and entered the Atlantic Reserve Fleet. Her name was struck from the Naval Register 1 November 1959.

== Awards and honors ==
Harkness received one battle star for World War II service.
