= USS Chatterer (AMS-40) =

Minesweeper of the United States Navy

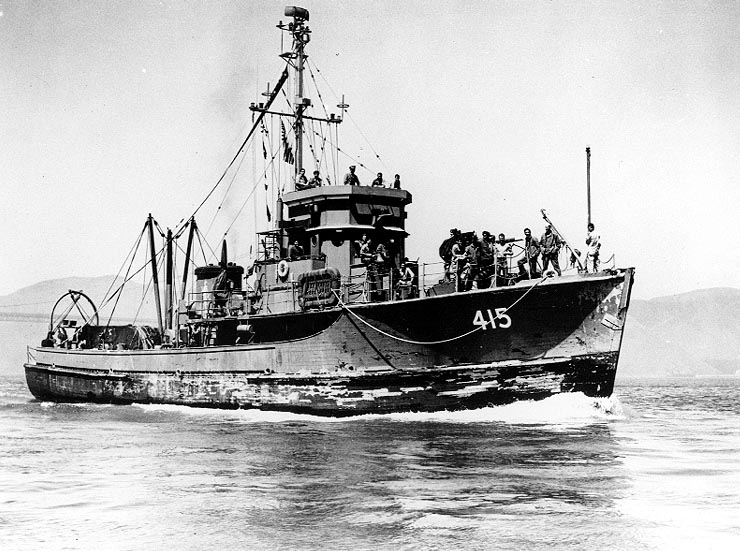
- USS YMS-415 In San Francisco Bay, California, c. 1945. Note figure painted on her stack. This ship became USS Chatterer (AMS-40) in 1947.

History

United States
- Name: USS Chatterer
- Laid down: 5 October 1943
- Launched: 15 April 1944
- Commissioned: 1 October 1944
- Decommissioned: 16 April 1955
- Fate: Transferred to Japan, 16 April 1955
- Acquired: returned from Japan, 1967
- Fate: Sold for scrap, 1 May 1968

History

Japan
- Name: JDS Yurishima (MSC-661)
- Acquired: 16 April 1955
- Fate: Returned to U.S., 1967

General characteristics
- Displacement: 270 tons
- Length: 136 ft (41 m)
- Beam: 24 ft 6 in (7.47 m)
- Draught: 8 ft (2.4 m)
- Propulsion: two 1,000 shp General Motors diesel engines, two shafts
- Speed: 15 kts
- Complement: 32
- Armament: one single 3 in (76 mm) gun mount, two 20 mm, two dcp

USS Chatterer (AMS-40/YMS-415) was a YMS-1-class minesweeper of the YMS-135 subclass acquired by the U.S. Navy for the task of removing mines that had been placed in the water to prevent ships from passing.

== History ==
Chatterer was laid down, 5 October 1943 by the Stadium Yacht Basin Inc., Cleveland, Ohio; launched, 15 April 1944; completed and commissioned USS YMS-415, 1 October 1944.

She was assigned to the Pacific Ocean, where she participated in operations off Okinawa in June 1945. Following the Japanese surrender, YMS-415 was active in mine clearance efforts in the vicinity of Japan.

She was named Chatterer and reclassified as a motor minesweeper, AMS-40, 11 March 1947. Stationed in Japan when the Korean War began in June 1950, Chatterer soon joined the effort to search for and clear enemy mine fields in the combat zone. She was retained in the Western Pacific after the conflict ended and was redesignated as a coastal minesweeper, Old, MSC(O)-40, 7 February 1955.

Chatterer was transferred to Japan 16 April 1955 as Yurishima (MSC 661); in the Japanese Maritime Self-Defense Force; Returned to the U.S. Navy in 1967; Sold for scrap 1 May 1968.
