= USS Ostrich (AMS-29) =

Minesweeper of the United States Navy

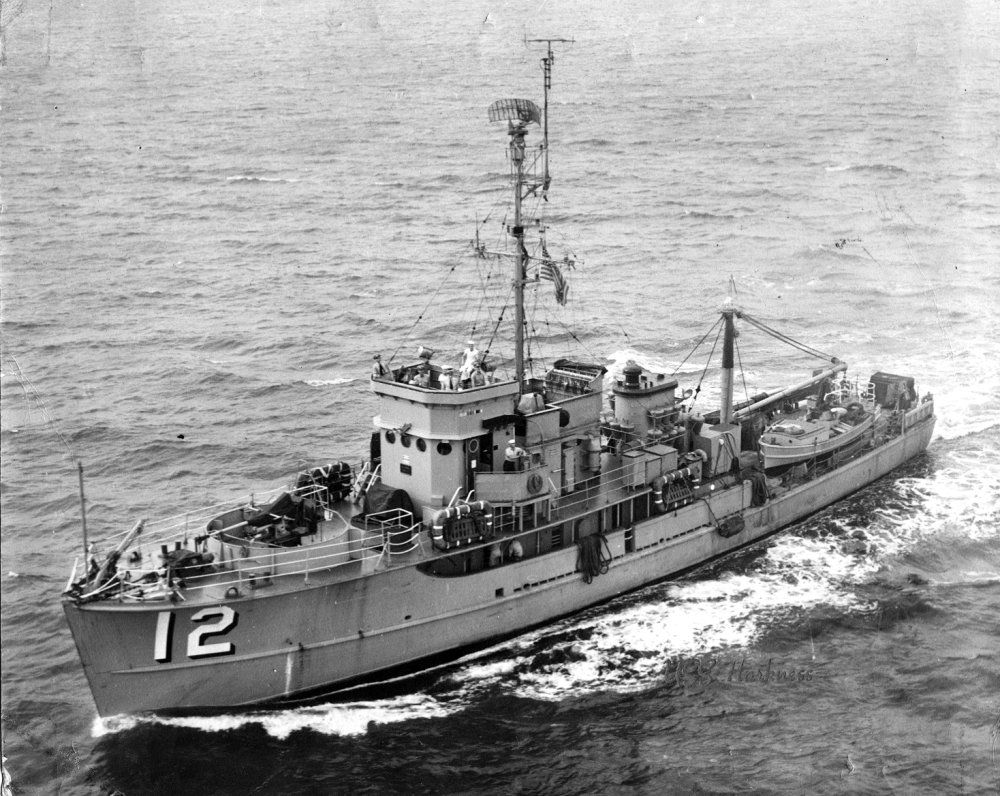
- A YMS-1-class minesweeper

History

United States
- Ordered: as YMS-430
- Laid down: 10 November 1943
- Launched: 23 March 1944
- Commissioned: 10 October 1944
- Decommissioned: 2 April 1946
- In service: 10 October 1946
- Out of service: December 1957
- Stricken: 1 November 1959
- Fate: Sold for scrap, 1960

General characteristics
- Displacement: 290 tons
- Length: 136 ft (41 m)
- Beam: 24 ft 6 in
- Draught: 6 ft 1 in
- Speed: 13 knots (15 mph; 24 km/h)
- Complement: 50
- Armament: one 3 in (76 mm) gun mount, two 20 mm machine guns

USS Ostrich (MSC(O)-29/AMS-29/YMS-430) was a YMS-1-class minesweeper of the YMS-135 subclass built for the United States Navy during World War II. She was the third U.S. Navy ship to be named for the ostrich.

== History ==
Ostrich was laid down 10 November 1943 as YMS-430 by the Tacoma Boatbuilding Company of Tacoma, Washington; launched 23 March 1944; and commissioned 10 October.

After shakedown, she sailed for Pearl Harbor 19 December as part of a screen for a small convoy. She arrived 28 December and sailed 4 January 1945, escorting a convoy to Eniwetok. She then sailed to Ulithi arriving 5 February. She remained in the area until departing 14 June for Okinawa to engage in Minesweeping operations.

YMS-430 remained there until 8 September, when she departed for Japan. Arriving at Wakayama, she remained in Japanese homewaters, clearing Japanese harbors and waters of mines, until 16 February 1946, when she sailed for home. She arrived at San Pedro, California, 2 April, and shortly after departed for Charleston, South Carolina, arriving 3 July. There YMS–430 was immobilized and placed in reduced commission due to a lack of personnel.

On 10 December, YMS-430 was once again placed in full commission and began training operations along the Southern Atlantic Coast. On 18 February 1947, YMS–430 was named Ostrich and redesignated AMS–29. Ostrich, in company with other sister ships, continued her operations along the Atlantic coast going as far north as Labrador and south as Florida, making frequent port calls. On 7 February 1955, Ostrich was redesignated MSC(O)–29.

Besides participating in several minesweeping training exercises, Ostrich also performed hydrographic work on occasion. Ostrich continued in this capacity until December 1957.

She proceeded to Green Cove Springs, Florida, where she was decommissioned in January 1958. Struck from the U.S. Naval Vessel Register 1 November 1959, Ostrich was sold for scrap early the next year.
