= USS Verdin (AMS-38) =

Minesweeper of the United States Navy

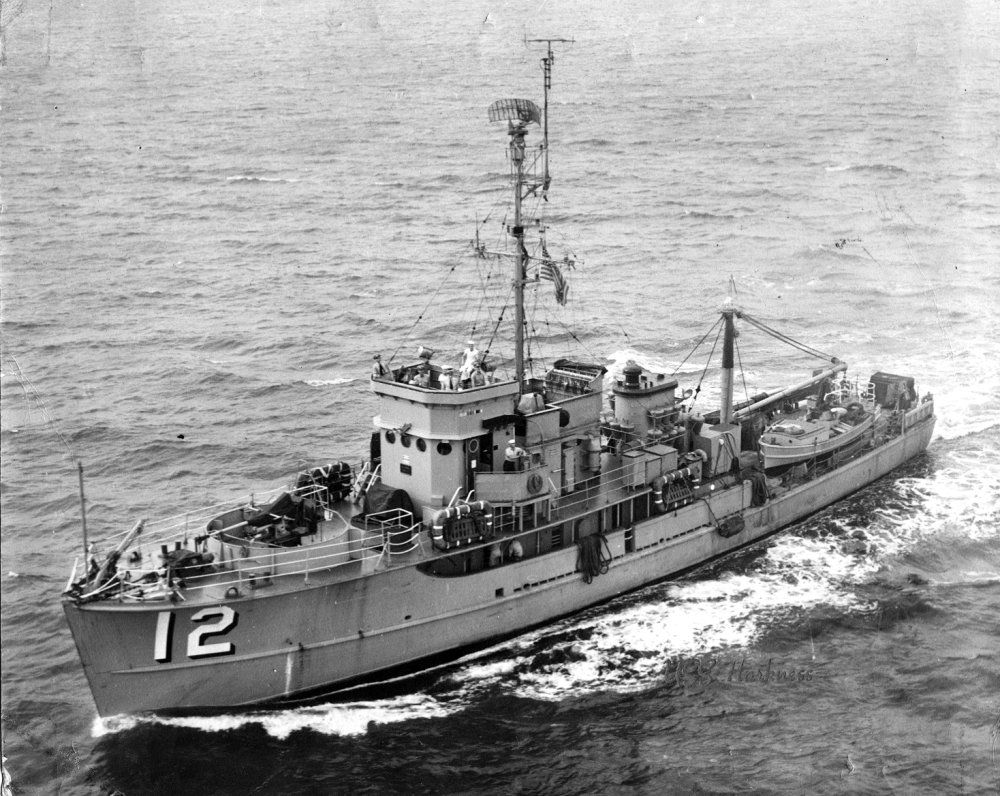
- A YMS-1 class minesweeper

History

United States
- Name: USS Verdin
- Builder: Gibbs Gas Engine Co., Jacksonville, Florida
- Laid down: 5 September 1943, as PCS-1439
- Launched: 23 May 1944
- Commissioned: 27 October 1944
- Decommissioned: 30 August 1955
- Renamed: YMS-471, 27 September 1943; USS Verdin (AMS-38), 18 March 1947
- Reclassified: MSC(O)-38, 7 February 1955
- Stricken: 1 November 1959

General characteristics
- Class & type: YMS-1-class minesweeper, YMS-446 subclass

Service record
- Operations: World War II
- Awards: 3 battle stars as YMS-471

USS Verdin was a YMS-1-class minesweeper of the US Navy that served during World War II. Laid down as PCS-1439 on 5 September 1943 at Jacksonville, Florida, by the Gibbs Gas Engine Co.; redesignated YMS-471 on 27 September 1943; launched on 23 May 1944; and commissioned on 27 October 1944.

== Service history ==
=== World War II ===
Following brief shakedown training, YMS-471 proceeded to Charleston, South Carolina, and began escorting coastwise convoys and conducting minesweeping operations. That duty ended in April 1945 when she was transferred to the Pacific Fleet. After a long voyage which took her by way of the Panama Canal, San Diego, Pearl Harbor, Eniwetok, Guam, and Saipan, the minesweeper finally joined the 3rd Fleet off Okinawa in June. During the last week of the month, she and the other ships of Mine Squadron (MinRon) 105 swept mines from the Buckner Bay, Kerama Retto, and Unten Ko areas of the Ryukyus. In July, YMS-471 ventured into the East China Sea for mine disposal operations.

=== Post-war ===
At the time Japan capitulated, the minesweeper was undergoing repairs at San Pedro Bay, Leyte, Philippines. Soon thereafter, she headed north to begin the monumental job of clearing mines from waters around Japan for transports bringing American occupation forces and supporting shipping. She concentrated on sweeping the approaches to the island of Honshū and remained at the task from 8 September 1945 until 20 February 1946, when she began preparations for the voyage back to the United States. The minesweeper reached the west coast in April 1946 and returned home to Charleston in June to begin demobilization.

Though never actually decommissioned, she remained inactive at Charleston until early in 1947, when she embarked upon a refresher training cruise in the West Indies. She also participated in a fleet exercise held off Cuba. On 18 March 1947, near the conclusion of the exercise, YMS-471 was renamed Verdin and was re-designated AMS-38. After a tour of duty at Yorktown, Virginia, serving as a training platform for the students of the Mine Warfare School, Verdin returned to Charleston in November where she remained until the following spring. In April 1948, she entered the Charleston Naval Shipyard for repairs and then put to sea once again for refresher training put of Norfolk, Virginia. In November, the minesweeper participated in cold weather fleet exercises off Newfoundland before returning to warmer waters.

This time, she reported to Panama City, Florida, for duty at the Navy's mine countermeasures research facility. For the next six years, Verdin alternated between mine warfare research duty at Panama City and mine warfare school ship operations at Yorktown. Periodic overhauls, mine and convoy exercises, and refresher training punctuated these two primary assignments. In November 1954, Verdin transferred back to Charleston where she became flagship for Mine Division 43. She spent her last eight active months there as an operational unit of the Mine Force. On 7 February 1955, she was redesignated MSC(O)-38. On 1 July 1955, she reported to Green Cove Springs, Florida, for inactivation. There, she went into reserve on 30 August 1955. A little over four years later, on 1 November 1959, her name was struck from the Navy List. No documents have been found giving details of her final disposition.

It is common knowledge in Veracruz, Mexico regarding it as being sold to a Mexican businessman who rechristened it as "María Poderosa", gutted the interior walls and bulkheads and used it as a cargo ship, sailing between the Gulf of México's Mexican seaports.
