= USS Lorikeet (AMS-49) =

Minesweeper of the United States Navy

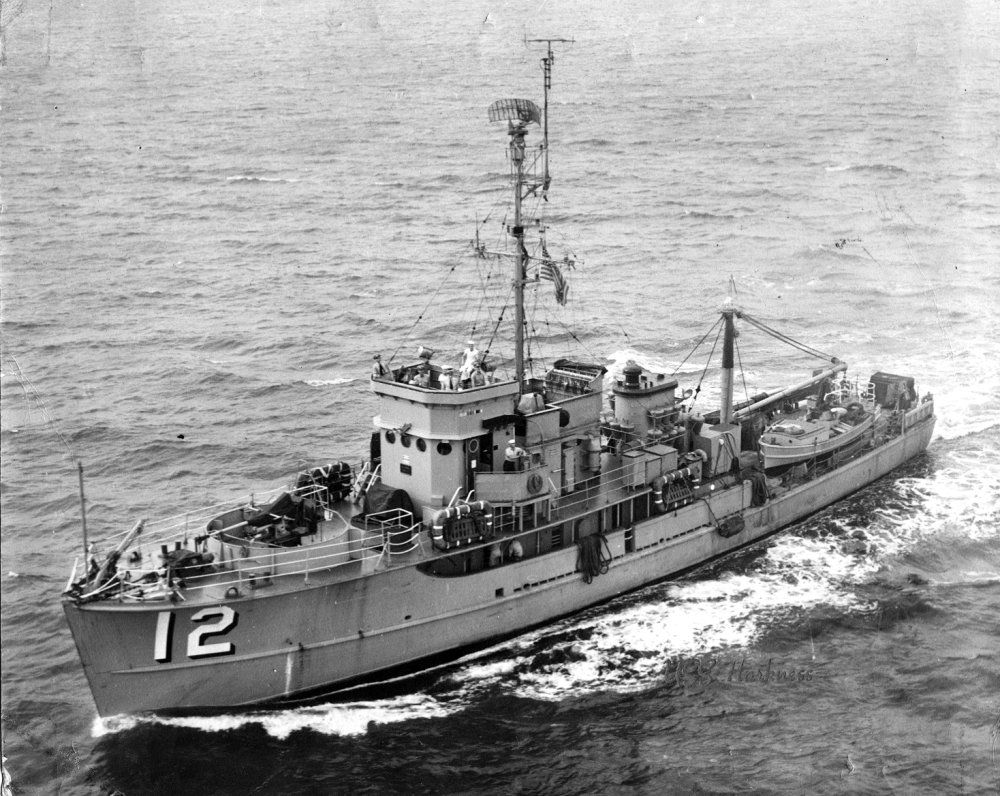
- A YMS-1-class minesweeper

History

United States
- Ordered: as YMS 271
- Laid down: 3 July 1942
- Launched: 17 October 1942
- Commissioned: 21 April 1943
- Decommissioned: 19 July 1946
- In service: 17 March 1950
- Out of service: 1964
- Stricken: 1 October 1964
- Fate: Scrapped

General characteristics
- Displacement: 215 tons
- Length: 136 ft (41 m)
- Beam: 24 ft 6 in (7.47 m)
- Draft: 6 ft 1 in (1.85 m)
- Speed: 13 knots
- Complement: 50
- Armament: one 3 in (76 mm) gun mount, two 20 mm machine guns

USS Lorikeet (AMS-49/YMS-271) was a YMS-1-class minesweeper of the YMS-135 subclass acquired by the U.S. Navy for the task of removing mines from water that had been placed there to prevent ships from passing.

== Operational history ==
Lorikeet (AMS 49) was laid down as YMS 271 by Bellingham Marine Railway & Boatbuilding Co., Bellingham, Washington, 3 July 1942; launched 17 October; and commissioned 21 April 1943.

Upon completion of shakedown, YMS 271 departed Seattle, Washington, 21 August 1943 to undergo intensive antisubmarine warfare training out of San Diego, California. Two months later she was underway for the Solomon Islands via Samoa and New Caledonia. Arriving 5 November, YMS 271 operated as a screening and escort vessel in the Solomons until 21 July 1944.

The tide of war having surged northward, she steamed next to Fiji Islands to sweep American mines from the area. Slightly damaged 8 October while taking a wind-driven, rudderless New Zealand corvette HMNZS Arbutus (K403) under tow, she repaired at Auckland, New Zealand, then resumed sweeping duties first around Noumea, New Caledonia, and later Espiritu Santo, New Hebrides.

Withdrawn for the impending Okinawa Gunto Invasion, YMS 271 participated in practice exercises near Tulagi, Solomon Islands, 17 February through 15 March 1945. On the latter date, she sailed as a convoy escort bound for the Ryukyus. While the main invasion force stormed ashore on the western side of Okinawa, this wooden-hulled vessel helped prepare the eastern bays to receive additional form of ships and men from 2 April to 12 May.

Though 15 percent of all naval casualties during this “Operation Iceberg” were suffered by minecraft, YMS 271 emerged unscratched. Following a brief overhaul at Saipan she returned to resume sweeping of the Kerama Retto Passage before undertaking preinvasion sweeps around Kume Shima. On 4 July operations took her into the East China Sea but immediately following surrender ceremonies they shifted to the passage off Wakayama, Japan. Rotated home 25 February 1946, she proceeded to Boston, Massachusetts, and decommissioned 19 July 1946.

She began a new career as a U.S. Naval Reserve training ship 1 September 1947, when she was placed in service and simultaneously reclassified as AMS 49 and named Lorikeet. She served the reserve training program in the Quincy Hingham, Massachusetts, area until she recommissioned 17 March 1950.

Lorikeet sailed 29 May from Boston for assignment with MinRon 4 based at Charleston, South Carolina. After a shakedown cruise to Guantanamo, Cuba, in July, she engaged in coastal exercises and cruises between Norfolk, Virginia, and Key West, Florida. Reclassified MSC(O) 49 on 7 February 1955, she participated in the U.S. Atlantic Fleet’s largest postwar mine warfare exercises to date, Operation LANTMINEX in the spring of 1955. In late 1956 she shifted her home port to Panama City, Florida.

She departed Panama City for Charleston arriving in late August 1957. She then sailed for New York 3 September where she decommissioned 18 September. Placed in service 30 October 1959, she once again became a Naval Reserve training ship, this time for the 3d Naval District. In January 1961 she provided the basis of training for two reserve crews attached to the Naval Reserve Training Center (NRTC) Jersey City, New Jersey.

From 1 July 1964 to 3 September 1968, Lorikeet served as flagship for Commander. Naval Reserve Mine Division 31 and was based at Perth Amboy, New Jersey. Lorikeet was relieved as flagship and Naval Reserve training ship on 3 September by USS Limpkin (MSC-195).

Placed out of service shortly after, she was struck 1 October from the U.S. Naval Vessel Register and was to be scrapped.

== Awards and honors ==
Lorikeet received three battle stars for World War II service.
