= YMS-1-class minesweeper =

1942 class of American minesweepers

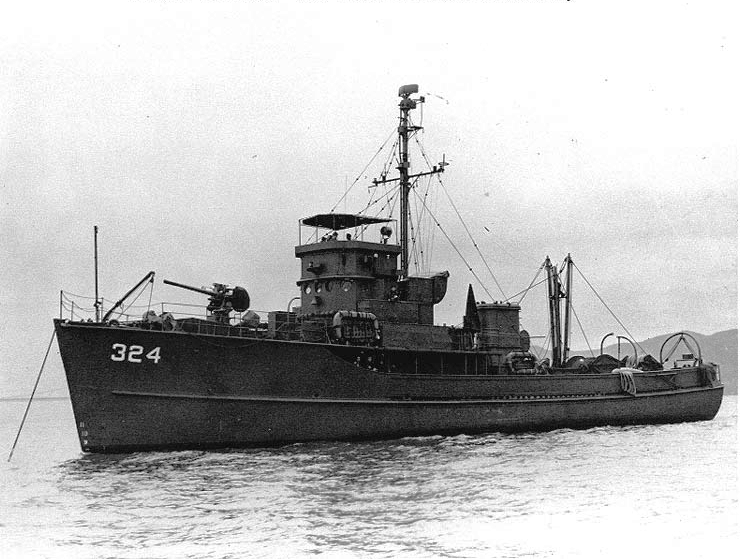
- USS YMS-324 in San Francisco Bay, c. 1945–46

Class overview
- Name: YMS-1
- Builders: 35 yacht builders
- Operators: United States Navy; Royal Navy; French Navy; Maritime Command; Polish Navy; Japan Maritime Self-Defense Force; Republic of Vietnam Navy
- Succeeded by: Atada class (Japan)
- Subclasses: YMS-136, YMS-446
- In commission: about March 1942 – 13 December 1957
- Completed: 481
- Canceled: YMS-482 – YMS-500
- Active: 0
- Lost: 32

General characteristics
- Type: Minesweeper
- Displacement: 270 tons
- Length: 136 ft (41 m)
- Beam: 24 ft 6 in (7.47 m)
- Draft: 8 ft (2.4 m)
- Propulsion: 2 × 440 bhp (330 kW) General Motors 8-268A diesel engines; 2 shafts
- Speed: 15 knots (28 km/h)
- Complement: 32
- Armament: 1 × 3-inch/50 caliber gun mount; 2 × 20 mm guns; 2 × depth charge projectors

The YMS-1 class of auxiliary motor minesweepers was established with the laying down of YMS-1 on 4 March 1941. Some were later transferred to the United Kingdom as part of the World War II Lend-Lease pact between the two nations. One ship eventually made its way into the Royal Canadian Navy postwar.

== Design ==
The design for the class had a displacement of 270 tonnes. The ships had a length of 136 feet (41 m), a beam of 24 ft 6 in (7.47 m), and a draft of 8 ft (2.4 m). The vessels were capable of 15 knots (28 km/h; 17 mph), being powered by two 440 shp (330 kW) General Motors (Cleveland) 8-268A, 2-cycle diesel engines which drove two shafts.

The ships had a complement of 32. Their armament comprised one single 3-inch/50 caliber gun mount, two 20 mm anti-aircraft guns and two depth charge projectors.

YMS-1-class ships were relatively small compared to larger contemporary US Navy ships. This led to a view by some sailors that the YMS-designated ships were cramped and particularly unsteady. These conditions were described (and surely exaggerated) by one author in a humorous poem "warning" other sailors to not transfer:

Men don't live on YMS's
they just exist under strains and stresses,
tossed around like a bundle of peas,
inside their ship on the calmest seas.

— Anonymous, "A Plug for a Distinguished Nervuos Cross"

== Subclasses ==
There were two mostly cosmetic sub-types of the class, sometimes referred to as classes themselves

=== YMS-135 subclass ===
This subclass was identical but had only one stack rather than two, and consisted of hull numbers YMS-135 through -445, YMS-480, and YMS-481.

=== YMS-446 subclass ===
This subclass was also identical but had no stacks, and comprised YMS 446–YMS 479.

=== BYMS ===
Eighty vessels of the class were ordered from US yards for transfer under Lend-Lease to the United Kingdom as the BYMS-class minesweeper. Another 53 built for the US Navy (with hull numbers between YMS-137 and -284) were transferred as further BYMS and another 17 were delivered later.

=== Other exports ===
France received 31 YMS-class minesweepers during World War 2, with one (D202, formerly YMS-77) being sunk by a mine in 1944. France kept its YMS-class ships in service after the end of the war, with seven remaining in service in 1962, used as training ships in the École Navale and as experimental vessels. Three ships of the class were transferred from France to South Vietnam in 1954, while another was transferred to Madagascar in 1961.

In 1947, Poland acquired former BYMS-2211 (renamed ORP Delfin), BYMS-2257 (renamed ORP Foka), and BYMS-2282 (renamed ORP Mors). The vessels were re-armed with Soviet 85 mm air defense gun M1939 (52-K) and four Soviet NSV machine guns. In the mid-1950s, they were removed from service. The ORP Delfin was scuttled in the Bay of Puck, where it remains a diving attraction.

The Japan Maritime Self-Defense Force received 8 vessels of this class in the 1950s. The class was named Ujishima-class minesweeper. The ships were:

- JDS Ujishima (MSC-655)
- JDS Etajima (MSC-656)
- JDS Nuwajima (MSC-657)
- JDS Yakushima (MSC-658)
- JDS Ogishima (MSC-659)
- JDS Yugeshima (MSC-660)
- JDS Yurishima (MSC-661)
- JDS Ninoshima (MSC-662)

== Examples ==
- USS Barbet (AMS-41)(YMS-45)
- USS YMS-61
- USS Albatross (AMS-1)(YMS-80)
- USS Brambling (AMS-42)(YMS-109)
- USS Brant (AMS-43)(YMS-113)
- USS Crossbill (AMS-45)(YMS-120)
- USS Bobolink (AMS-2)(YMS-164)
- USS Cardinal (AMS-4)(YMS-179)
- USS Fulmar (AMS-47)(YMS-193)
- USS Courser (AMS-6)(YMS-201)
- HMS BYMS-2203 (J1003)(YMS-203)
- USS Crow (AMS-7)(YMS-215)
- USS Curlew (AMS-8) (YMS-218)
- USS Flicker (AMS-9)(YMS-219)
- USS Firecrest (AMS-10)(YMS-231)
- USS Flamingo (AMS-11)(YMS-238)
- USS Harkness (AMCU-12)(YMS-242)
- USS James M. Gilliss (AMCU-13)(YMS-262)
- USS Lapwing (AMS-48)(YMS-268)
- USS Lorikeet (AMS-49)(YMS-271)
- HMS BYMS-2282 (YMS-282)
- USS Reedbird (AMS-51)(YMS-291)
- USS Rhea (AMS-52)(YMS-299)
- USS Robin (AMS-53)(YMS-311)
- USS Grackle (AMS-13)(YMS-312)
- USS Grouse (AMS-15) (YMS-321)
- USS Plover (AMS-33)(YMS-442)
- USS Redhead (AMS-34)(YMS-443)
- USS Hawk (AMS-17)(YMS-362)
- USS Hornbill (AMS-19)(YMS-371)
- USS Hummer (AMS-20)(YMS-372)
- USS Jackdaw (AMS-21)(YMS-373)
- USS Kite (AMS-22)(YMS-374)
- USS Lark (AMS-23)(YMS-376)
- USS YMS-386
- USS Seagull (AMS-55)(YMS-402)
- USS Chatterer (AMS-40)(YMS-415)
- USS YMS-418
- USS Mockingbird (AMS-27)(YMS-419)
- USS Siskin (AMS-58) (YMS-425)
- USS Ostrich (AMS-29)(YMS-430)
- USS Parrakeet (AMS-30)(YMS-434)
- USS Partridge (AMS-31)(YMS-437)
- USS Pelican (AMS-32)(YMS-441)
- USS Turkey (AMS-56)(YMS-444)
- USS Sanderling (AMCU-49)(YMS-446)
- USS McMinnville (PCS-1401)(YMS-452)
- USS Swan (AMS-37)(YMS-470)
- USS Verdin (YMS-471)
- USS Waxbill (MHC-50)(YMS-479)
- USS Swallow (AMS-36)(YMS-461)

=== Survivors ===
- USS YMS-328, yacht
- RV Calypso, research ship
- MV Uchuck III, Merchant vessel, USS YMS-123

== See also ==
- Wooden boats of World War II
- List of mine warfare vessels of the United States Navy § Auxiliary Motor Mine Sweepers (YMS)
