= USS Cardinal (AMS-4) =

Minesweeper of the United States Navy

History

United States
- Name: USS YMS-179
- Builder: Henry C. Grebe and Co.; Chicago, Illinois
- Laid down: 27 October 1942
- Launched: 8 May 1943
- Completed: 31 July 1943
- Commissioned: 28 August 1943, New Orleans, Louisiana
- Decommissioned: 6 August 1946
- Reclassified: AMS-4, 17 February 1947
- Renamed: Cardinal, 18 February 1947
- Namesake: the cardinal bird
- In service: 1 December 1948, Naval Reserve training ship
- Recommissioned: 22 September 1950
- Decommissioned: 18 November 1957
- Reclassified: MSC(O)-4, 7 February 1955
- Stricken: 1 November 1959
- Home port: Charleston, South Carolina (from 15 February 1954)
- Honors and awards: 1 battle star, World War II
- Fate: Transferred to Brazil, 15 August 1960

Brazil
- Name: Javari (M 11)
- Acquired: 15 August 1960
- Fate: Scrapped in 1970

General characteristics
- Class & type: YMS-135 subclass of YMS-1-class minesweepers
- Displacement: 270 t
- Length: 136 ft (41 m)
- Beam: 24 ft 6 in (7.47 m)
- Draft: 8 ft (2.4 m)
- Propulsion: 2 × 880 bhp General Motors 8-268A diesel engines; 2 shafts
- Speed: 15 knots (28 km/h)
- Complement: 32
- Armament: 1 × 3"/50 caliber dual purpose gun mount; 2 × 20 mm guns; 2 × depth charge projectors

USS Cardinal (MSC(O)-4/AMS-4/YMS-179) was a YMS-1-class minesweeper of the YMS-135 subclass built for the United States Navy during World War II. She was the third ship in the U.S. Navy to be named for the cardinal.

== History ==
Cardinal was laid down as YMS-179 on 27 October 1942 by Henry C. Grebe and Co., Chicago, Illinois; launched 8 May 1943; completed, 31 July 1943; and commissioned USS YMS-179 on 28 August 1943 at New Orleans, Louisiana.

Departing New Orleans 7 September 1943 she steamed to Norfolk, Virginia, and arrived 13 September for shakedown training in the Chesapeake Bay and final alterations in the Norfolk Navy Yard. She got underway for Key West, Florida, 13 October, assigned to Commander Gulf Sea Frontier at Naval Operating Base Key West, Florida. During the next six months, she was assigned as a convoy escort from Key West making countless voyages along the Gulf Coast with merchant ships and naval auxiliaries.

She was sometimes diverted on escort voyages to Havana and Guantanamo Bay, Cuba, and frequently called at the Florida ports of Miami and Port Everglades. She departed Key West for the last time 16 April 1944 and joined a convoy at Havana for escort to Norfolk.

She left the convoy off the coast of Virginia 21 April 1944 and entered the New York Navy Yard the next day for voyage repairs. YMS 179 arrived in Boston Harbor 17 May 1944 for duty under with Northern Group, Eastern Sea Frontier, and operated as a patrol ship off the Boston breakwater. She entered the Norfolk Navy Yard 6 July 1944 to prepare for distant service and cleared Norfolk 24 July as part of a convoy which reached Mers El Kébir, Algeria, 10 August.

She patrolled off that harbor while awaiting the staging of a task force and got underway 20 August 1944 to support the Invasion of Southern France. A unit of Mine Division 32, Squadron 11, Eighth Amphibious Force of the U.S. 6th Fleet, she arrived in the Golfe de Frejus, off St. Raphael, France 25 August 1944.

She was immediately engaged in sweeping minefields near the Harbor of Nice, when, on 14 September 1944, she opened fire to help silence a troublesome enemy battery which had been harassing operations. Her actions were answered by shells that fell so close that shrapnel showered her deck wounding one man. She continued her operations under heavy fire of shore batteries until they were completely silenced by the Edison (DD-439).

Stopping at Toulon 22 September, she reached Palermo on the 24th. For the next seven months she swept mines in the vicinity of Palermo and the port of Cagliari, Sardinia, and conducted brief rests at Naples, Leghorn, and Genoa. She got underway from Palermo 15 June 1945 for return to the United States arriving in New York 30 June 1945. While at New York, she underwent repairs until 16 August 1945 when she put to sea for the Pacific.

She sailed by way of San Pedro, California, on a cruise to the Hawaiian, Marianas, and Philippine Islands. She returned to San Pedro 1 February 1946 for local operations.

She was placed out of commission, in reserve, at San Diego, California, 6 August 1946. On 17 February 1947 her classification was changed to AMS 4, and was renamed Cardinal the following day. The minesweeper remained in reserve until 1 December 1948 when she was placed in the service of the Eleventh Naval District at San Diego for local training of Naval Reservists. She continued in this important service until officially recommissioned 22 September 1950. During the next three years she was employed in waters off the coast of California and the Hawaiian Islands.

On 15 February 1954, her home port was changed to Charleston, South Carolina from which she would operate for the next three years. On 7 February 1955, her hull classification was changed to MSC(O)-4.

Her time was split between training in local waters, periodic tours of service in the Chesapeake Bay as a school ship for students of the Naval Mine Warfare School of Yorktown, Virginia; refresher training cruises which included visits to the Virgin Islands, Puerto Rico, and the Dominican Republic; and upkeep periods in the Norfolk Navy Yard.

This duty terminated 10 September 1957 when she stood out of Charleston Harbor for inactivation in the Boston Navy Yard. She arrived at Boston 14 September and was placed out of commission, in reserve, 18 November 1957.

She remained inactive at Boston until stricken from the Naval Register 1 November 1959. Final Disposition, she was loaned to the Government of Brazil and renamed Javari (M 11) on 15 August 1960. There she remained in service until she was scrapped by the Brazilians in 1970.

== Honors and awards ==
YMS-197 received one battle star for her support of the invasion of Southern France during World War II.
