= Auxiliary motor minesweepers =

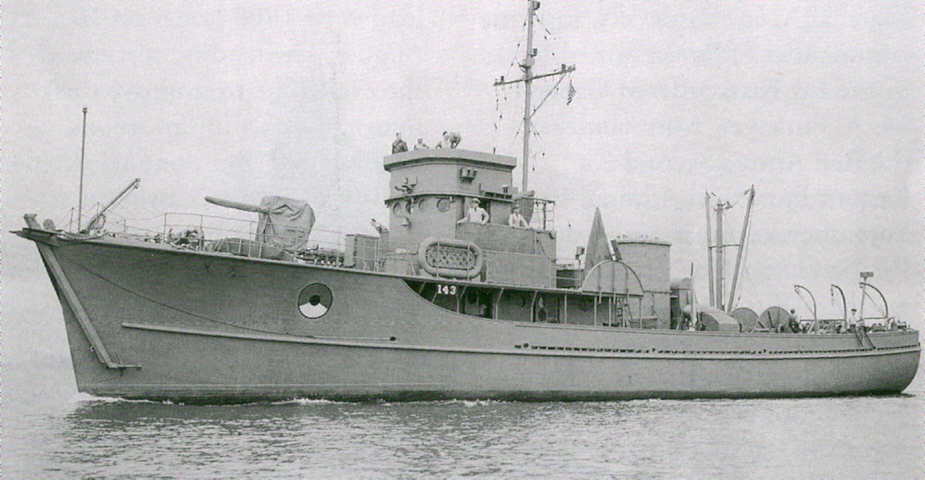
The U.S. Navy auxiliary motor minesweeper USS YMS-143 when new in February 1943. Secretly transferred to the Soviet Navy on 17 May 1945 during Project Hula, she became T-522 and took part in the Soviet conquest of the Japanese province of Karafuto on southern Sakhalin Island between 11 and 25 August 1945. T-522 served in the Soviet Navy until stricken in July 1956 and dismantled for spare parts.

Auxiliary motor minesweepers were small wood-hulled minesweepers commissioned by the United States Navy for service during World War II. The vessels were numbered, but unnamed. The auxiliary motor minesweepers were originally designated yard minesweepers (YMS) and kept the abbreviation YMS after being re-designated. The type proved successful and eventually became the basis for the AMS type of United States Navy minesweeper.

== Origin of the YMS ==
The Henry B. Nevins Shipyard, Inc., at City Island, Bronx, designed the YMS and laid the keel of the first one, USS YMS-1, on 4 March 1941. Launched on 10 January 1942, YMS-1 was completed two months later on 25 March 1942. From keel-laying to completion, the yard built YMS-1 in one year and three weeks.

== The "Y" designation ==
The first wooden minesweeper of this class was to gain prominence in all theaters during World War II. A total of 561 were built at various U.S. yards. Originally a class of "motor minesweepers" (MS), "Y" was added to distinguish them from other minesweeper types; sources disagree on whether "Y" stood for "yardcraft" – indicating a type of craft assigned for duty within a navy shipyard or naval base and not expected to go beyond waters adjacent to the base – or to indicate they were built by yacht-builders; YMSs were built at 35 yacht yards, rather than at larger shipyards, 12 on the United States East Coast, 19 on the United States West Coast, and four in yards on the Great Lakes.

== Use as minesweepers ==
Records show that YMSs were used in the United States Navy to sweep mines laid by enemy submarines as early as 1942 off the ports of Jacksonville, Florida, and Charleston, South Carolina. Many served in the Pacific. One of their greatest losses occurred on 9 October 1945, when seven U.S. Navy YMSs were sunk in a typhoon off Okinawa.

The wood-hulled YMS proved to be one of the U.S. Navy's more durable and versatile types through a quarter-century of service, filling a variety of roles for a number of navies.

== Characteristics ==
All 481 ships of this type had the same general characteristics. The only significant variation within the type was one of appearance; YMS-1 through YMS-134 had two stacks, YMS-135 through YMS-445, YMS-480, and YMS-481 had one, while YMS-446 through YMS-479 had none.

== History ==
Originally rated as service craft, they were used during World War II for inshore sweeping to prepare the way for amphibious assaults. Surviving YMSs were reclassified as AMS in 1947, given names, and re-rated as mine warfare ships; in 1955 they received the new type symbol MSC(O), changed to MSCO in 1967. These ships bore much of the mine warfare burden in Korea, formed a major portion of U.S. Navy minecraft strength through the 1950s, and provided underway training for Naval Reservists in the 1960s.

A number of YMSs were transferred to other navies during or after the war. During Project Hula, the United States secretly transferred 31 of them to the Soviet Union between 17 May and 3 September 1945, and some of these saw action in the Soviet Navy during Soviet military operations against the Japanese between 9 August and 5 September 1945. The transfer of five more was canceled when transfers halted on 5 September 1945. One, T-610 (ex-USS YMS-285), sank in 1945 while in Soviet service, and the Soviet Union transferred two, T-605 (ex-USS YMS-301) and T-611 (ex-USS YMS-287), to the People's Republic of China after striking them from the Soviet Navy list in 1955; during 1955 and 1956 the other 28 were scrapped by the Soviet Union or destroyed off its coast by mutual agreement between the two countries. Five YMS's served in the German Navy in different functions for tests, trials, and training; all of them had a civilian crew and were decommissioned between 1975 and 1988.

== YMS-327 last YMS in service ==
USS Ruff (MSCO-54), originally YMS-327, the last of her kind in U.S. service, was struck from the Navy List in November 1969.

== See also ==
- YMS-1-class minesweeper
- BYMS-class minesweeper
