= Sotoyomo-class tugboat =

Class of U.S. Navy rescue tugboats

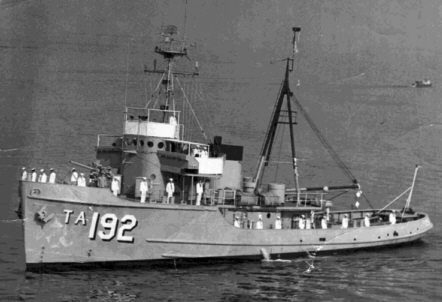
- Sotoyomo-class fleet tugboat USS Tillamook

Class overview
- Name: Sotoyomo class
- Operators: United States Navy; Royal Navy
- Preceded by: Cherokee class
- Succeeded by: ATA-214 class
- Built: 1943-1945
- Completed: 49
- Active: 5 (foreign)
- Lost: 2
- Retired: 41
- Preserved: 2

General characteristics
- Type: Tugboat
- Displacement: 534 long tons (543 t) light; 835 long tons (848 t) full
- Length: 143 ft (44 m)
- Beam: 33 ft (10 m)
- Draft: 13 ft (4.0 m)
- Propulsion: 2 × 12-278A diesel-electric engines, 1 × gears, 1 × screw, 1,200shp
- Speed: 13 knots (24 km/h; 15 mph)
- Complement: 45
- Armament: 1 × 3"/50 caliber gun; 2 × 20mm cannon

The Sotoyomo-class tugboats were a class of United States Navy rescue tugboats. The lead ship was USS Sotoyomo, laid down in September 1942. Designed as "rescue tugs", the class consisted of forty-nine ships, classified as auxiliaries. Sotoyomo commemorates a part of the Sioux tribe.

== Ships ==
=== United States ===
Ship name	Hull number	Builder	Commissioned	Decommissioned	Fate
Sotoyomo	ATA-121	Levingston Shipbuilding Company	29 May 1943	1 July 1955	Transferred to Mexico, June 1963; fate unknown
n/a	ATA-122	Levingston Shipbuilding Company	10 June 1943	Unknown	Transferred to Chile, 19 September 1947; decommissioned in 1991 and transferred to Uruguay, 1992; fate unknown
Iuka	ATA-123	Levingston Shipbuilding Company	30 June 1943	26 November 1947	Sold to a commercial interest, 13 April 1976; sold for scrap, 2 December 1996
n/a	ATA-124	Levingston Shipbuilding Company	24 July 1943	6 May 1947	Sold for scrap, 13 June 1979
n/a	ATA-125	Levingston Shipbuilding Company	12 August 1943	Unknown	Sold to a commercial interest, 24 December 1945; sunk as a target, 1985
ATA-126 through ATA-130 leased to the United Kingdom under the terms of the Lend-Lease.
n/a	ATA-170	Gulfport Shipbuilding Corporation	7 December 1943	Unknown	Transferred to Greece, 1947; scrapped, 1990
n/a	ATA-171	Gulfport Shipbuilding Corporation	1943	n/a	Sunk, 12 April 1944
n/a	ATA-172	Gulfport Shipbuilding Corporation	23 February 1944	Unknown	Sold to a commercial interest, 1947; fate unknown
n/a	ATA-173	Gulfport Shipbuilding Corporation	12 April 1944	Unknown	Sold to a commercial interest; fate unknown
Wateree	ATA-174	Levingston Shipbuilding Company	20 July 1944	14 March 1955	Transferred to Peru, 1 November 1961; fate unknown
Sonoma	ATA-175	Levingston Shipbuilding Company	3 August 1944	8 November 1946	Sold to a commercial interest, 13 April 1976; scrapped, 1989
Tonkawa	ATA-176	Levingston Shipbuilding Company	19 August 1944	8 May 1956	Transferred to Taiwan, April 1962; fate unknown
n/a	ATA-177	Levingston Shipbuilding Company	2 September 1944	Unknown	Transferred to Chile, 29 September 1947; fate unknown
Tunica	ATA-178	Levingston Shipbuilding Company	15 September 1944	23 September 1947	Sunk as a target, 29 January 1999
Allegheny	ATA-179	Levingston Shipbuilding Company	22 September 1944	14 December 1968	Sold to a commercial interest, 1969; currently active in Puerto Rico
n/a	ATA-180	Levingston Shipbuilding Company	27 September 1944	Unknown	Scrapped
Accokeek	ATA-181	Levingston Shipbuilding Company	7 October 1944	29 June 1972	Sunk as artificial reef, 20 February 1987
Unadilla	ATA-182	Levingston Shipbuilding Company	16 October 1944	22 July 1955	Sold to a commercial interest, 13 April 1976; scrapped, 1996
Nottoway	ATA-183	Levingston Shipbuilding Company	26 October 1944	22 October 1946	Fate unknown
Kalmia	ATA-184	Levingston Shipbuilding Company	6 November 1944	1 July 1971	Transferred to Colombia, 31 October 1977; fate unknown
Koka	ATA-185	Levingston Shipbuilding Company	16 November 1944	1971	Sold to a commercial interest, 1971; sunk as a breakwater, date unknown
Cahokia	ATA-186	Levingston Shipbuilding Company	24 November 1944	Unknown	Transferred to Taiwan, 1 May 1976; fate unknown
Salish	ATA-187	Levingston Shipbuilding Company	7 December 1944	10 February 1972	Transferred to Argentina, 10 February 1972; decommissioned and sunk as a target on 19 May 2025
Penobscot	ATA-188	Levingston Shipbuilding Company	12 December 1944	1971	Sold to a commercial interest; fate unknown
Reindeer	ATA-189	Levingston Shipbuilding Company	20 December 1944	29 August 1947	Fate unknown
Samoset	ATA-190	Levingston Shipbuilding Company	1 January 1945	12 September 1969	Fate unknown
n/a	ATA-191	Levingston Shipbuilding Company	12 January 1945	1946	Fate unknown
Tillamook	ATA-192	Levingston Shipbuilding Company	23 January 1945	1 July 1971	Fate unknown
Stallion	ATA-193	Levingston Shipbuilding Company	1 February 1945	October 1969	Transferred to the Dominican Republic, 30 October 1980; retired 2006.
Bagaduce	ATA-194	Levingston Shipbuilding Company	14 February 1944	31 May 1979	Sold to a commercial interest, 1980; currently a bed and breakfast
Tatnuck	ATA-195	Levingston Shipbuilding Company	26 February 1945	1 July 1971	Sold to a commercial interest, 1979; fate unknown
Mahopac	ATA-196	Levingston Shipbuilding Company	6 March 1945	Unknown	Fate unknown
Sunnadin	ATA-197	Levingston Shipbuilding Company	15 March 1945	20 November 1969	Fate unknown
Keosanqua	ATA-198	Levingston Shipbuilding Company	19 March 1945	25 May 1956	Transferred to South Korea, 1 February 1962; fate unknown
Undaunted	ATA-199	Gulfport Shipbuilding Corporation	29 October 1944	1947	Sold to a commercial interest, 1998; currently active
n/a	ATA-200	Gulfport Shipbuilding Corporation	31 October 1944	Unknown	Run aground, 15 August 1965; declared a total loss
Challenge	ATA-201	Gulfport Shipbuilding Corporation	15 September 1944	23 December 1947	Sold to a commercial interest, 1978; currently active
Wampanoag	ATA-202	Gulfport Shipbuilding Corporation	8 December 1944	30 January 1980	Operational museum ship
Navigator	ATA-203	Gulfport Shipbuilding Corporation	1 January 1945	20 October 1946	Sunk as a target, date unknown
Wandank	ATA-204	Gulfport Shipbuilding Corporation	18 January 1945	1 July 1971	Sunk as a target, 1979
Sciota	ATA-205	Gulfport Shipbuilding Corporation	30 January 1945	January 1947	Fate unknown
Pinola	ATA-206	Gulfport Shipbuilding Corporation	10 February 1945	6 April 1956	Transferred to South Korea, 2 February 1962; fate unknown
Geronimo	ATA-207	Gulfport Shipbuilding Corporation	1 March 1945	19 September 1947	Transferred to Taiwan, 1968; fate unknown
Sagamore	ATA-208	Gulfport Shipbuilding Corporation	19 March 1945	1 February 1972	Transferred to the Dominican Republic, 1 February 1972; returned to the U.S., 15 September 1979; sold for scrap, 12 January 1994
Umpqua	ATA-209	Gulfport Shipbuilding Corporation	2 April 1945	1 July 1971	Transferred to Colombia, 1 July 1971; run aground, 1975 and later scrapped
Catawba	ATA-210	Gulfport Shipbuilding Corporation	18 April 1945	Unknown	Sunk during storm, Transferred to Argentina, 10 February 1972; decommissioned and sunk as a target on 2017
Navajo	ATA-211	Gulfport Shipbuilding Corporation	3 May 1945	10 April 1962	Sold to a commercial interest, 1963; currently active
Algorma	ATA-212	Gulfport Shipbuilding Corporation	21 May 1945	20 December 1946	Sold to a commercial interest, 13 April 1976; fate unknown
Keywadin	ATA-213	Gulfport Shipbuilding Corporation	1 June 1945	30 June 1970	Sunk as a target, 3 June 2001

=== United Kingdom ===
Ship name	Hull number	Commissioned	Decommissioned	Fate
Favourite	BAT-3	15 June 1942	27 March 1946	Scrapped, 1993
Integrity	BAT-4	15 July 1942	19 February 1946	Sold to a commercial interest, 13 February 1948; fate unknown
Lariat	BAT-5	10 August 1942	19 February 1946	Sold to a commercial interest, 17 September 1946; fate unknown

== See also ==
- Type V ship - Tugs
