= USS Sunnadin =

USS Sunnadin may refer to the following ships of the United States Navy:

- USS Sunnadin (AT-28) a Bagaduce-class tugboat serving from 1919 to 1946
- USS Sunnadin (ATA-197) a Sotoyomo-class tugboat serving from 1945 to 1969
