= USS Unadilla (ATA-182) =

U.S. Navy tug boat

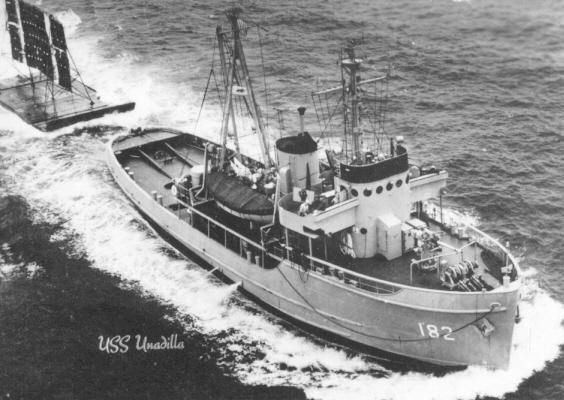
- USS Unadilla (ATA-182) underway while towing a target sled.

History

United States
- Name: Unadilla
- Builder: Levingston Shipbuilding Company, Orange, Texas
- Laid down: 30 June 1944
- Launched: 5 August 1944
- Commissioned: 16 October 1944
- Decommissioned: 26 November 1946
- Recommissioned: 3 May 1951
- Decommissioned: 22 July 1955
- Reclassified: Auxiliary Fleet Tug (ATA-182),15 May 1944
- Stricken: 1 September 1961
- Identification: Hull symbol: ATA-182; Code letters: NJQI; IMO number: 7942271
- Fate: Acquired for commercial service by Erato Shipping & Trading Corp. S.A., Panama, 13 April 1976

General characteristics
- Class & type: Sotoyomo-class auxiliary fleet tug
- Displacement: 534 long tons (543 t) (standard); 835 long tons (848 t) (full load)
- Length: 143 ft (44 m)
- Beam: 33 ft (10 m)
- Draft: 13 ft (4.0 m)
- Installed power: 2 × GM 12-278A Diesel-electric engines; 1,200 shp (890 kW)
- Propulsion: 1 × Fairbanks Morse Main Reduction gear; 1 × screw propeller
- Speed: 12 knots (22 km/h; 14 mph)
- Complement: 45
- Armament: 1 × 3 in (76 mm)/50 caliber Dual purpose gun; 2 × 20 mm (0.79 in) Oerlikon cannons

Unadilla was an ocean tugboat of the United States Navy and Maritime Administration in service intermittingly between 1944 and 1961. After she was commissioned, she operated in the Pacific during World War II, and later, the Korean War. In 1961, she was laid up and transferred to the Maritime Administration before she was disposed of sometime in the early 1970s.

== Service history ==
Although originally projected as steel-hulled, seagoing, rescue tug ATR-109, the third Unadilla was re-classified an auxiliary ocean tug and redesignated ATA-182 on 15 May 1944; laid down on 30 June 1944 at Orange, Texas, by the Levingston Shipbuilding Co.; launched on 5 August 1944; and commissioned on 16 October 1944.

Following shakedown training out of Norfolk, VA, ATA-182 transited the Panama Canal and then supported fleet operations in the Pacific through the cessation of hostilities with Japan and into 1946. During this period, she operated at Ulithi, Eniwetok, and Leyte, primarily towing floating drydocks. Returning to the west coast late in 1946, ATA-182 was decommissioned on 26 November 1946 at Portland, Oregon, and placed in reserve there.

After being named Unadilla on 16 June 1948J she retained her hull number designation ATA-182. The ship was recommissioned at Astoria, Oregon, on 3 May 1951. She moved south and conducted refresher training out of San Diego, California, into the winter. Proceeding to Seattle, Washington, on 3 January 1952, she arrived there on the 8th and picked up three YFN's for towing to the Hawaiian Islands. Departing on 11 January, Unadilla and her three unwieldy charges labored through heavy seas in a 17-day passage to Pearl Harbor. During the voyage, one YFN broke loose but was soon recovered.

Deploying to the Western Pacific (WestPac), Unadilla proceeded via Guam to Japan and arrived at Sasebo on 17 March. The tug towed targets until late August for fleet units conducting underway training exercises off the southern coast of Honshu. During this deployment, the ocean-going tug was twice employed in Korean waters: on the first occasion, she put into Jeju-do to escort a damaged LST back to Sasebo; and, on the second, Unadilla carried a medical unit to Ulleungdo to combat a typhus epidemic. The medical mission resulted in the ship's receiving the Korean Presidential Unit Citation.

Departing WestPac on 21 August, Unadilla arrived at San Diego on 6 September, via Pearl Harbor. The ship towed targets off the coast of southern California through February 1953; towed YFR-888 from Panama to Long Beach from 3 to 16 March; and deployed to WestPac again in the late summer of that year. She arrived at Sasebo on 5 September, via Pearl Harbor and Midway.

Unadilla spent her second WestPac deployment much like the first, towing targets for exercising units of the 7th Fleet off the southern coast of Japan from September 1953 to March 1954. Escorting Gypsy (ARSD-i) from Kwajalein to Pearl Harbor while en route to the west coast, the tug arrived at San Diego on 29 April. She conducted local operations from May to August, towing targets for the Fleet Training Group at San Diego. Following a regular yard overhaul and an inspection period, Unadilla resumed these operations in January 1955.

Unadilla subsequently sailed for the Pacific Northwest and arrived at Astoria, Oregon, on 29 April 1955. Placed in reserve on that date, the ocean-going tug prepared for deactivation. Decommissioned and placed in reserve on 22 July, she lay in reserve at Portland until struck from the Navy list on 1 September 1961. Shifted to the Maritime Administration (MARAD) lay-up facility at Olympia, Washington, the erstwhile ocean-going tug was towed to the MARAD facility at Suisun Bay, Calif., in 1971. She was disposed of sometime between 1972 and 1975.

Unadilla received two battle stars for her Korean War service.
