= USS Penobscot (ATA-188) =

Tugboat of the United States Navy

History

United States
- Namesake: An Indian tribe of Algonquian stock, inhabitants of eastern Maine
- Builder: Levingston Shipbuilding Company, Orange, Texas
- Laid down: 11 September 1944 as Rescue Ocean Tug (ATR-115)
- Launched: 12 October 1944
- Christened: as ATR–115
- In service: 12 December 1944 as USS ATA-188
- Out of service: 1971
- Renamed: USS Penobscot (ATA-188) 16 July 1948
- Stricken: 28 February 1975
- Home port: Pearl Harbor, Hawaii; New York City, New York
- Identification: IMO number: 8424226; MMSI number: 367176040; Callsign: WDD6673
- Fate: sold c. 1975; in commercial service

General characteristics
- Class & type: Sotoyomo
- Type: Auxiliary ocean tugboat
- Tonnage: 534 tons
- Length: 143 ft (44 m)
- Beam: 33 ft (10 m)
- Draft: 13 ft (4.0 m)
- Propulsion: diesel-electric engines, single screw
- Speed: 13 knots
- Complement: 45 officers and enlisted
- Armament: one single 3 in (76 mm) gun mount and two twin 40 mm gun mounts

USS Penobscot (ATA-188/ATR–115) -- a Sotoyomo-class auxiliary fleet tug—was originally placed in service by the U.S. Navy as USS ATA–188 until she was renamed USS Penobscot (ATA-188) 16 July 1948. She served in the Pacific Ocean during World War II, and on the U.S. East Coast after the war's end. She was finally decommissioned in 1971.

== Built in Orange, Texas ==
The third ship to be so named by the U.S. Navy, Penobscot (ATA–188), an auxiliary ocean tug, was laid down as ATR–115 by Levingston Shipbuilding Company, Orange, Texas, 11 September 1944; launched 12 October; and placed in service 12 December.

== World War II service ==
Following shakedown Penobscot was designated for duty in the Far East. Assigned homeyard at Pearl Harbor, she provided extensive advanced base towing services and called at numerous islands as events in the march towards victory in the Pacific reached a crescendo. With the end of hostilities, the ocean tug operated for a short time out of Chinese ports.

== Post-war service ==
In April 1946 Penobscot returned to home waters and was assigned to the 3rd Naval District. From this point she commenced a lengthy career of east coast towing operations. As a 3rd Naval District ship homeported at New York City and berthed at the Naval Supply Center, Bayonne, New Jersey, she spent an average of half of each year away from home port, ranging from Maine to the Caribbean Islands.

In addition to towing assignments, Penobscot conducted torpedo and naval mine recovery operations, and provided a wide range of services to ships of the Fleet. One demonstration of her operational flexibility occurred in May 1967 when she assisted USNS Mission Capistrano in oceanographic research off Bermuda.

In July 1967 she shifted from the 3rd Naval District List to the Service Force, Atlantic Fleet. After overhaul at Coastal Shipyard and Drydock Company, Staten Island, New York, that autumn, Penobscot resumed her multifarious tasks, nearly every aspect of which involves the rendering of service to the Fleet.

== Decommissioning ==
After being decommissioned in 1971, she was laid up in the Atlantic Reserve Fleet and was sold after being struck from the Navy List 28 February 1975.

As of 2014 she was in commercial service under then name American Lady.
