= USS Pinola (ATA-206) =

Tugboat of the United States Navy

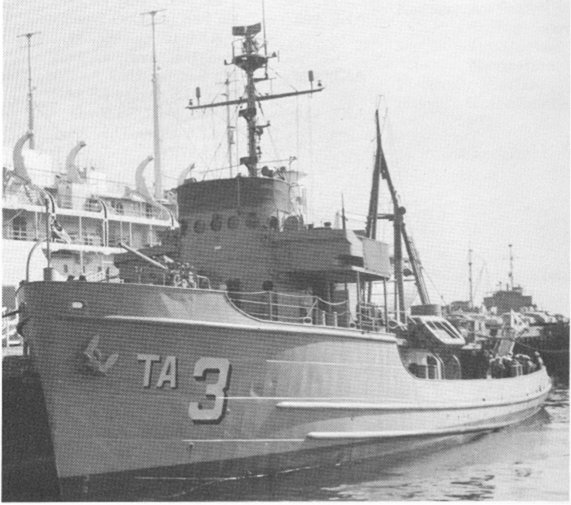
- Ex-Pinola in South Korean Naval service as ROKS Do Bong (ATA-3) moored pierside, date and location unknown.

History

United States
- Builder: Gulfport Boiler and Welding Works, Port Arthur, TX
- Reclassified: Auxiliary Fleet Tug ATA-206, 15 May 1944
- Laid down: 26 October 1944
- Launched: 14 December 1944
- Commissioned: USS ATA-206, 10 February 1945
- Decommissioned: 4 October 1946
- Renamed: Pinola (ATA-206), 16 June 1948
- Recommissioned: 10 January 1949
- Decommissioned: 6 April 1956
- Fate: Transferred under the Military Assistance Program to South Korea, 2 February 1962

South Korea
- Name: ROKS Do Bong (ATA-3)
- Acquired: 2 February 1962
- Decommissioned: 1970s
- Fate: Unknown

General characteristics
- Class & type: Sotoyomo-class auxiliary fleet tug
- Displacement: 534 t.(Long tons); 835 t. Full load
- Length: 143 ft (44 m)
- Beam: 33 ft (10 m)
- Draft: 13 ft (4.0 m)
- Propulsion: diesel-electric engines, single screw
- Speed: 13 knots (24 km/h; 15 mph)
- Complement: 45
- Armament: 1 × single 3"/50 caliber gun mount; 2 × twin 40 mm AA gun mounts

The USS Pinola (ATA-206) was a Sotoyomo-class auxiliary fleet tug launched in 1945 and serving until 1956. The ship was transferred to the Republic of Korea in 1962.

== Construction ==
The ship was planned and authorized as Rescue Ocean Tug ATR-133 but redesignated "Auxiliary Fleet Tug ATA-206" on 15 May 1944. The hull was laid down by the Gulfport Shipbuilding Corporation, Port Arthur, Texas 26 October 1944; launched 14 December 1944; and commissioned as ATA-206 10 February 1945.

== History ==
=== Service as ATA-206 ===
ATA-206 completed shakedown 10 March 1945, then steamed to Gulfport, Mississippi to pick up YF-754 for towing to San Diego. Thence she proceeded to Hawaii and departed Pearl Harbor 11 May towing AED-21 to Guam. She sailed from Apra Harbor 5 July to operate from Chimu Wan Harbor, Okinawa, where she arrived with a dump scow and another barge in tow the 15th. Towing and salvage operations in the vicinity of Buckner Bay kept her busy for the remainder of the war. On 22 July she salvaged an Army dredge off a coral reef in Buckner Bay and later refloated a gasoline tanker aground on a coral reef in Chimu Wan Harbor.

She sailed for Subic Bay in the Philippines 30 January 1946, and picked up a lend-lease dredge for towing to Melbourne, Australia. On 20 February, while being towed, that dredge sank of an unknown cause and the tug returned to San Pedro Bay in Leyte Gulf. Here she took YD-121 in tow for a long voyage past the Marianas and Marshall Islands to Pearl Harbor.

=== Recommissioned as Pianola ===
She returned to San Diego and decommissioned 4 October 1946. She was named Pinola 16 June 1948.

Pinola recommissioned 10 January 1949 and was assigned to Service Squadron 1, U.S. Pacific Fleet, to serve primarily towing target sleds for surface gunnery exercises for the Fleet Training Group based at San Diego, Calif. This service was interrupted by a cruise to Sasebo, Japan for operations in Service Squadron 3, 2 August 1954 – 27 March 1955.

=== Transfer to Korea ===
The Pinola was decommissioned on 6 April 1956 and was transferred to the Republic of Korea on 2 February 1962 under the Military Assistance Program, and served into the 1970s as ROKS Do Bong (ATA-3). Her ultimate fate is unknown.
