= USS General W. G. Haan =

US Navy transport ship

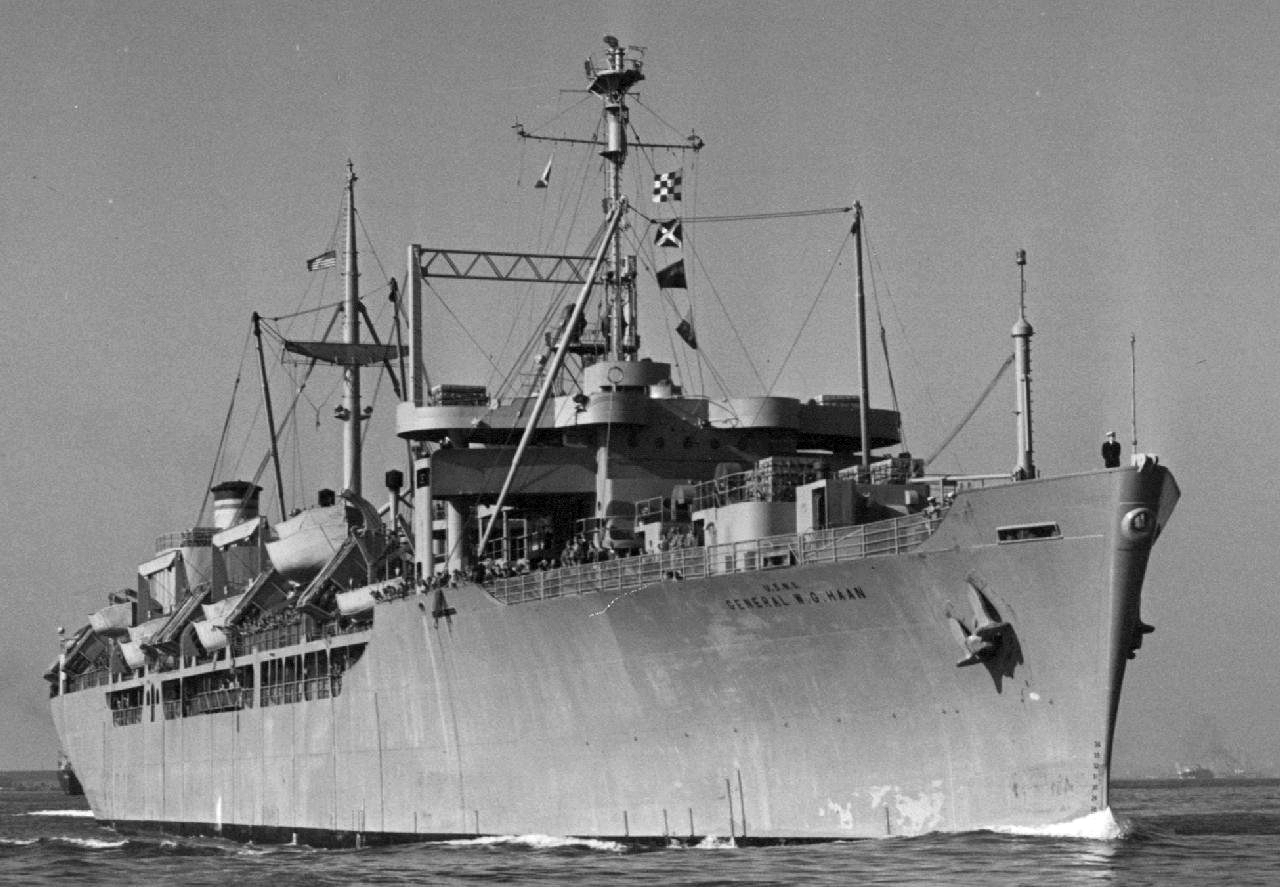
- USNS General W. G. Haan (T-AP-158) underway, in the 1950s

History

United States
- Name: General W. G. Haan
- Namesake: Major General William George Haan
- Ordered: as a Type C4-S-A1 hull, MC hull 715
- Builder: Permanente Metals Corporation, Richmond, California
- Yard number: 29
- Launched: 20 March 1945
- Sponsored by: Miss Helen Coxhead
- Commissioned: 2 August 1945
- Decommissioned: 7 June 1946
- Identification: Hull symbol: AP-158; Code letters: NDOI
- Fate: Transferred to the Army Transportation Service (ATS), 7 June 1946

United States
- Name: General W. G. Haan
- Operator: ATS
- Acquired: 7 June 1946
- Fate: Reacquired by the Navy, 1 March 1950

United States
- Name: General W. G. Haan
- Operator: MSTS
- Acquired: 1 March 1950
- Out of service: Reduced operational status, March 1955
- In service: Fully operational status, December 1956
- Out of service: Reduced operational status, 7 January 1957
- Fate: laid up in the Atlantic Reserve Fleet, Orange, Texas, Group; Transferred to the Maritime Administration (MARAD), laid up in the National Defense Reserve Fleet, Beaumont, Texas, 20 October 1968; Title transfer to Hudson Waterway Corp. (MARAD Exchange), November 1969

United States
- Name: Transoregon
- Operator: Hudson Waterway Corp.
- Acquired: November 1969
- Refit: rebuilt as a container ship, December 1969
- Fate: Sold to Puerto Rico Maritime Shipping Authority, 14 October 1974

Puerto Rico
- Name: Transoregon; Mayaquez
- Operator: Puerto Rico Maritime Shipping Authority
- Acquired: 14 October 1974
- Renamed: Mayaqez, 4 March 1975
- Fate: Sold to Merchant Terminal Corp., 20 September 1982

United States
- Name: Amco Trader
- Operator: Merchant Terminal Corp
- Acquired: 20 September 1982
- Fate: Sold to Steamco Co., June 1985

United States
- Name: Amco Trader
- Operator: Steamco Co.
- Acquired: 20 September 1982
- Fate: Sold to Crestwood Corp., 19 November 1985

United States
- Name: Trader
- Operator: Crestwood Corp.
- Acquired: 19 November 1985
- Identification: IMO number: 6904868
- Fate: Sold for scrapping, 2 October 1986

General characteristics
- Class & type: General G. O. Squier-class transport ship
- Type: Type C4-S-A1
- Tonnage: 1,900 t (1,900 long tons) DWT
- Displacement: 9,950 long tons (10,110 t) (light); 17,250 long tons (17,530 t) (full)
- Length: 522 ft 10 in (159.36 m)
- Beam: 71 ft 6 in (21.79 m)
- Draft: 26 ft 6 in (8.08 m)
- Installed power: 2 × Babcock & Wilcox header-type boilers, 465 psi (3,210 kPa) 450 °F (232 °C); 9,000 shp (6,700 kW)
- Propulsion: 1 × Westinghouse geared turbine; 1 × double Westinghouse Main Reduction Gears; 1 × Propeller
- Speed: 16.5 kn (30.6 km/h; 19.0 mph)
- Capacity: 70,000 cu ft (2,000 m^{3}) (non-refrigerated)
- Troops: 228 officers, 3595 enlisted
- Complement: 32 officers, 324 enlisted
- Armament: 4 × 5 in (127 mm)/38 caliber dual purpose (DP) gun; 2 × twin 40 mm (1.57 in) Bofors anti-aircraft (AA) gun mounts; 15 × twin 20 mm (0.79 in) Oerlikon cannon AA gun mounts

USS General W. G. Haan (AP-158) was a General G. O. Squier-class transport ship for the US Navy in World War II. She was named in honor of US Army Major General William G. Haan. She was transferred to the US Army as USAT General W. G. Haan in 1946. On 1 March 1950, she was transferred to the Military Sea Transportation Service (MSTS) as USNS General W. G. Haan (T-AP-158). She was later sold for commercial operation under several names before being scrapped in 1987.

== Construction ==
General W. G. Haan was launched 20 March 1945, under Maritime Commission (MARCOM) contract, MC hull 715, by Permanente Metals Corporation, Yard No. 3, Richmond, California; sponsored by Miss Helen Coxhead; acquired by the Navy and simultaneously commissioned 2 August 1945.

== Service history ==
General W. G. Haan conducted shakedown training out of San Diego, California, until after the surrender of Japan. Departing 4 September 1945, for the southwest Pacific, the transport touched at Eniwetok, Leyte, and Manila, before returning to Seattle, Washington, with homecoming veterans 22 October. Subsequently, the ship made two voyages to Japan and the Philippines, bringing occupation troops and embarking returning servicemen. She returned to San Francisco, California, after her last passage, and departed 30 April 1946, for the East Coast via the Panama Canal. Arriving Baltimore, Maryland, 25 May, General W. G. Haan decommissioned there 7 June 1946, and was returned to the War Shipping Administration (WSA) for further transfer to the Army Transport Service.

The General Haan departed from Bremerhaven on 5 March 1949 for New York, "with 884 passengers of whom 372 are Jewish", according to a cable (7 March 1949) from Jointfund Emigration Bremen.

The General Haan was scheduled to depart on 9 April 1949 for Boston, according to a cable (11 April 1949) from Jointfund Emigration Bremen.

The General Haan departed from Bremerhaven on 3 May 1949 for New York, "with 884 passengers of whom 279 are Jewish", according to a cable (4 May 1949) from Jointfund Emigration Bremen.

The General Haan was scheduled to depart on 31 May 1949 for New York, according to a cable of the same date from Jointfund Emigration Bremen.

The General Haan was scheduled to depart on 5 July 1949 for New York, according to a cable (30 June 1949) from Jointfund Emigration Bremen.

The General Haan was scheduled to depart on 31 July 1949 for Boston, according to a cable (1 August 1949) from Jointfund Emigration Bremen.

The General Haan was scheduled to depart on 22 August 1949 for New York, according to a cable of the same date from Jointfund Emigration Bremen.

The General Haan was scheduled to depart on 17 September 1949 for New York, according to a cable (15 September 1949) from Jointfund Emigration Bremen.

On 2 October 1949, General W. G. Haan departed Naples with 1303 displaced persons from Eastern Europe for resettlement in Australia, arriving 15 November 1949, at Melbourne. On 18 December 1949, she left Bremerhaven arriving 28 December, in New York City with mostly Polish passengers. She completed another voyage to Melbourne on 21 February 1950, with 1301 more refugees.

Reacquired by the Navy 1 March 1950, General W. G. Haan was assigned to Military Sea Transportation Service (MSTS) under a civilian crew. Until 1953, she operated under the International Refugee Organization and carried displaced East Europeans from northern European ports to the United States. In 1952, General W. G. Haan also made two support voyages to the American bases at Thule, Greenland, and Goose Bay, Labrador. Following this demanding duty, the ship made several voyages to Europe in support of American units. She continued this steaming schedule until March 1955, when she was placed in Reduced Operational Status at New York.

In December 1956, General W. G. Haan resumed duty as a refugee transport, steaming from Bremerhaven to New York, and arriving on 7 January 1957. She embarked refugees from the Hungarian Revolution, among them, András István Gróf, who would eventually take the helm of Intel Corporation. General W. G. Haan was again placed in Reduced Operational Status in the Atlantic Reserve Fleet, Orange, Orange, Texas, and was returned to the Maritime Administration (MARAD) 22 October 1958. She entered the National Defense Reserve Fleet for layup at nearby Beaumont.

== Merchant service ==
She was sold for commercial use in 1968, to Hudson Waterways Corporation, of New York. In 1969, the ship was rebuilt as a 13,489 gross ton container ship by Maryland Shipbuilding & Dry Dock Co. in Baltimore, Maryland, and renamed Transoregon, hauling containerized cargo for Seatrain Lines. In 1975 she was sold to the Puerto Rico Maritime Shipping Authority and renamed Mayaguez (not to be confused with the Sea-Land ship of the same name involved in the Mayaguez incident). She was sold in 1982, the Merchant Terminal Corporation of New York and renamed Amco Trader. She was laid up in New York when sold to Steamco Co. on June 1985. She was resold to Crestwood Corp., 19 November 1985, and renamed Trader. She was scrapped at Taiwan in 1987.

== Bibliography ==
Online resources

- "LST-925". Dictionary of American Naval Fighting Ships. Naval History and Heritage Command. 13 July 2015. This article incorporates text from this source, which is in the public domain.
- "Kaiser Permanente No. 3, Richmond CA". ShipbuildingHistory.com. 27 November 2010.
- "USNS General W. G. Haan (T-AP-158)". NavSource. 6 September 2013.
- Swiggum, S.; Kohli, M. (2 July 2010). "Ship Descriptions – G". The Ships List.
- "Immigrant Ships, Transcribers Guild, General Haan". ImmigrantShips.net. 25 October 2002.
- Tündern-Smith, Ann (31 December 2006). "Ships of the Fifth Fleet". FifthFleet.net.

Printed resources

- Williams, Greg H. (2013). World War II U.S. Navy Vessels in Private Hands. McFarland Books. ISBN 978-0-7864-6645-0.
