= USS Allegheny (ATA-179) =

Tugboat of the United States Navy

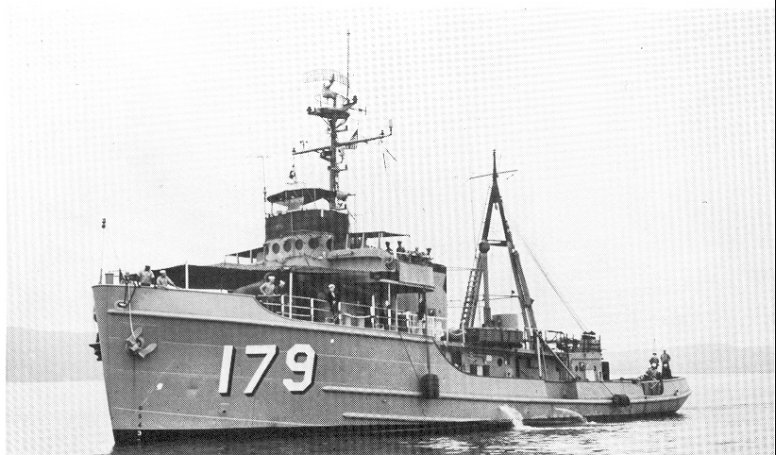
- USS Allegheny (ATA-179) underway, date and location unknown.

History

United States
- Name: ATA-179 (1944-1948); Allegheny (1948-?); Alejandro (?)
- Builder: Levingston Shipbuilding Co., Orange, Texas
- Laid down: 22 May 1944
- Launched: 30 June 1944
- Commissioned: 22 September 1944
- Recommissioned: 25 July 1949
- Decommissioned: 14 December 1968
- Reclassified: Auxiliary Fleet Tug, ATA-179, 15 May 1944
- Stricken: 14 December 1968
- Identification: IMO number: 7606633; MMSI number: 367396910; Callsign: WDE7729
- Fate: Sold to a commercial interest

General characteristics
- Class & type: Sotoyomo-class tugboat
- Displacement: 534 t.(lt) 835 t.(fl)
- Length: 143 ft (44 m)
- Beam: 33 ft (10 m)
- Draft: 13 ft (4.0 m)
- Propulsion: diesel-electric engines, single screw
- Speed: 13 knots (24 km/h; 15 mph)
- Complement: 45
- Armament: one single 3 in (76 mm) dual purpose gun mount; two single 20 mm AA gun mounts

USS Allegheny (ATA-179) was an American Sotoyomo-class auxiliary fleet tug launched in 1944 and serving until 1968. She underwent conversion to a research vessel in 1952.

== Construction ==
The unnamed single-screw ocean-going tug ATA-179 (originally projected as the rescue tug, ATR-106) was laid down on 22 May 1944 at Orange, Texas, by the Levingston Shipbuilding Co.; launched on 30 June 1944; and commissioned on 22 September 1944.

== World War II operations ==
After fitting out, ATA-179 conducted shakedown training out of Galveston, Texas, before undergoing post-shakedown availability at that port until 24 October. Two days later, the tug departed Galveston for Tampa, Florida, with a covered lighter, YF-6H, in tow, and reached her destination on the 28th. Taking the barracks ship APL-19 in tow, the tug sailed for the Panama Canal Zone on 4 November 1944, reaching her destination with her two tows on the 13th. Transiting the Panama Canal three days later, she sailed for Bora Bora, in the Society Islands, on 30 November 1944, and reached her destination on 22 December. On the day after Christmas, ATA-179 got underway for Finschhafen, New Guinea, towing YF-6H. She then towed the lighter to Hollandia, New Guinea, arriving on 12 January 1945, before proceeding on to Leyte with APL-19 and YF-6U in tow, arriving there on 5 February 1945.

Assigned to Service Squadron Three, Service Force, Seventh Fleet, ATA-179 cleared Leyte on 18 February 1945 for the Carolines and reached Ulithi the following day. There, she took two floating workshops, YRD(H)-6 and YRD(M)-6, in tow and departed Ulithi on 24 February for the Philippines. Proceeding via Kossol Roads, in the Palaus, ATA-179 arrived at Leyte on 12 March 1945 and delivered her tows. Departing San Pedro Bay on 24 March, the tug reached Cebu on the 26th and picked up LCT-1296. towing her to Leyte.

Proceeding thence to Hollandia, New Guinea, having left the tank craft at Leyte, ATA-179 picked up the tow of a dredge and four pontoon barges on 18 April and delivered them to Leyte on 1 May 1945. Returning to Hollandia, the tug then picked up four ammunition barges and towed them to Leyte as well, reaching the Philippines on 7 June. ATA-179 proceeded thence to Espiritu Santo, in the New Hebrides, reaching that port on 26 June 1945. On 7 July, the tug cleared the New Hebrides with Section B of the advanced base sectional dock, ABSD-1, and the open lighter, YC-324, and headed for the Philippines. Proceeding via Hollandia, the tug and her two charges reached their destination on 2 August 1945.

Departing Leyte on 7 August, ATA-179 sailed for the Padaido Islands, and there took David B. Henderson in tow on 12 August. She proceeded thence to Biak, New Guinea, and arrived on the following day. During the week that followed, ATA-179 towed a 400-ton pontoon drydock to Morotai and the covered lighter, YF-621, to Leyte. Proceeding thence to Morotai, the tug towed a 400-ton floating drydock and the motor minesweeper YMS-47 to Samar, and a 100-ton pontoon drydock from there to Subic Bay. For the balance of October 1945, the tug operated in the Philippine Islands, between Samar and Leyte. She towed seven pontoon barges from Samar to Subic Bay (24 to 28 October) and spent the remainder of 1945 and the first few months of the following year, 1946, based at Leyte.

ATA-179 departed Leyte on 30 March 1946. She reached Manus, in the Admiralty Islands, on 6 April and departed there eight days later with a section of ABSD-4 in tow. Touching briefly at Eniwetok and Johnston Island en route, the tug reached Pearl Harbor on 24 May and proceeded thence to the west coast of the United States soon thereafter, towing AFD-2 to San Pedro. She then took LCS-66 to San Diego and arrived there on 12 September. Moving to San Pedro the same day, ATA-179 took APL-43 in tow and sailed for the Canal Zone on 12 October. She reached her destination on the 18th, and departed 11 days later, bound for Jacksonville, Florida with APL-43 and APL-34 in her wake, to deliver her tows to the Florida group of the reserve fleet. With new orders to deliver the barracks ships elsewhere, however, for preservation work, ATA-179 proceeded to Charleston, South Carolina, which she reached on 8 November 1946.

Over the next several months, ATA-179 participated in the demobilization process of many fleet units assigned temporarily to the Commandant, 8th Naval District, and performed tug and tow operations on the Gulf and Florida coasts, ranging from Key West and Mayport to New Orleans, Mobile, and Galveston until she herself was inactivated and placed out of commission, in reserve at Orange, Texas, on 10 October 1947. On 16 July 1948, she was named Allegheny (ATA-179).

== Hydrographic survey operations ==
Allegheny was recommissioned on 25 July 1949 and departed for the Norfolk Naval Shipyard arriving on 8 August and remaining until 26 September when she sailed for New York. The ship departed New York on 1 October 1949 for the Mediterranean in company with USS Stallion (ATA-193) and the survey ship USS Maury (AGS-16) which composed Hydrographic Survey Group One of the U.S. Navy Hydrographic Office. The group reached Gibraltar on 13 October. Transiting the Mediterranean the survey group put in at Naples, Italy on 19 October. The ships sailed for Port Said, Egypt with a one day stop on 21 October at Argostolion, Greece. The ships reached the northern terminus of the Suez Canal on 24 October transiting on the 25th to reach Aden on 30 October 1949.

Allegheny commenced her hydrographic work in that region soon thereafter. Over the next several weeks, she supported Maury as that ship operated in the Gulf of Aden, the Arabian Sea, the Gulf of Oman, and the Persian Gulf conducting surveys of the uncharted waters of the Arabian coast. She touched at ports in Saudi Arabia; Kuwait; Bahrain; and Pakistan. The survey ships transited the Suez Canal on 4 May. Allegheny rounded out the deployment with visits to Algiers and Gibraltar before she sailed for the United States, reaching Norfolk on 27 May 1950. She moved to New York soon thereafter, and underwent post-deployment availability at the New York Naval Shipyard from 3 June to 8 September.

Allegheny conducted survey operations at Newport, RI, following her overhaul at New York from 9 to 29 September 1950. She then returned to the naval shipyard following that work, to prepare for another deployment to the Persian Gulf, and sailed for the Mediterranean on 6 October. Reaching Gibraltar on 19 October, Allegheny visited Golfe Juan from 22 to 25 October and touched briefly at Port Said from 30 to 31 October before transiting the Suez Canal and proceeding down the Red Sea. Reaching Bahrain on 11 November, she remained there until the 13th when she got underway for Ras Tanura, making port there later the same day. She spent the remainder of the year 1950 and the first three and one-half months of 1951 operating from that Saudi oil port, ultimately sailing for Suez on 18 April 1951. She wound up the deployment with calls at Port Said, Naples, Algiers, and Gibraltar before she got underway to return to the United States on 18 May 1951.

Allegheny arrived at the New York Naval Shipyard on the last day of May 1951 remaining there through the summer and into September. The ship departed New York on 17 September for Hampton Roads reaching Norfolk the next day. On 10 October she sailed for her third deployment to the Mediterranean and Middle Eastern waters visiting Athens from 30 October to 2 November before brief surveys in the Mediterranean before transiting the Suez Canal on 5 November. A port call at Aden on 10 November preceded her arrival at Bahrain on 17 November 1951. As in the previous deployment, she conducted survey work in the Bahrain-Ras Tanura area into the spring of 1952, winding up her work at the latter port on 12 April. Transiting the Suez Canal on 24 and 25 April 1952, Allegheny visited Naples and Monaco en route home, ultimately reaching Norfolk on 29 May 1952.

== Acoustic research operations ==
Allegheny transited from Norfolk to the New York Naval Shipyard arriving on 14 June 1952 for conversion into a research vessel. During the summer of 1952 all armament and towing accessories were removed with the towing winch rotated 90° and modified for over the side operations. Various hydrographic and bathythermograph winches and booms were installed as was sonar and various electronic equipment. Shipboard spaces were converted to a machine shop, motor generator, and photographic laboratory. A new deckhouse was constructed aft to house underwater sound and electronic equipment. Allegheny was assigned to the Commandant, 3rd Naval District, for duty and based at the Naval Supply Center, Bayonne, NJ, The ship spent the next 17 years engaged in hydrographic and research functions through the Office of Naval Research (ONR).

The ship supported acoustic research efforts of the Hudson Laboratories of Columbia University, Bell Telephone Company and Woods Hole Oceanographic Institute. In general the ship spent January through April in the Bermuda-Caribbean area with the rest of the year in the Long Island-Hudson Canyon region, off New York, and occasionally operations off Cape Hatteras. Ports of call included St. Thomas, Virgin Islands; San Juan, Puerto Rico; Willemstad, Curaçao; Miami and Port Everglades, Florida.; and Bermuda. In particular the ship supported Project Michael which was the Columbia University effort under Maurice Ewing to understand long range sound transmission in the SOFAR channel for the research and development of the Sound Surveillance System (SOSUS). Project Michael was the research oriented part of the effort with a more development oriented Project Jezebel under Bureau of Ships and Bell Laboratories. Merger of results were implemented as the then classified name Sound Surveillance System under the unclassified name Project Caesar. (Note: There is close correlation of the dates and organizations with the early phase of developing the Sound Surveillance System (SOSUS) and associated acoustic research and development.)

An example of the ship's work is Hudson Laboratory's acoustic work in 1953. It was focused on low frequency sound propagation with Allegheny performing both bathymetric and acoustic work supporting those investigations. For example, the ship surveyed in Puerto Rico supporting an important installation with an echosounder giving ten times the resolution of regular equipment. That survey revealed submarine canyons that were independent of terrestrial topography and ran seaward to open into a 4,150 fathoms (24,900 ft; 7,590 m) plain. (Note: The first SOSUS array and shore station were commissioned at Puerto Rico September 1954.) The ship also worked in determining the noise pattern of submarines and an investigation of shallow water acoustics for mine sweeping in the approaches to New York harbor. The ship engaged in other shallow water work off Puerto Rico as a sound source ship.

The loss of USS Thresher (SSN-593) resulted in a large search effort to locate the wreckage. Task Group 89.7 was formed for the search and was composed of various vessels at different times over the long search period. Allegheny was assigned to the task group from 24 April to 15 May 1963 as part of the "fine grain survey" group. Mission Capistrano, assigned to ONR for Project Artemis, was the center for processing data that was delivered by small boats at sea from Allegheny, Prevail and Naval Research Laboratory's (NRL) Rockville which was equipped with a unique trainable sonar and an electronics laboratory and workshop. The fine grain search area was a 10 nmi (12 mi; 19 km) square area in which each of the ships was assigned a quadrant for survey with its precision Fathometer. The survey, using the Decca Navigator System met the requirement to cover the entire area with its soundings but expanded the original twelve possible hull parts to ninety. That number of possibles made classification by ships equipped for that task difficult and required further steps to make those ships' search more proficient.

Highlighting the latter part of her long tour of research support work was a towing operation—something she had not been configured for in many, many years. Underway from Bayonne on 31 January 1967, Allegheny sailed for Bermuda, arriving on 3 February. No longer possessing a towing engine or fittings, the research vessel had to jury-rig a towing arrangement to the "Monster Buoy" (General Dynamics Buoy "Bravo")- Setting out for the west coast of the United States on 11 February, Allegheny and the "Monster Buoy" headed for the Pacific. Touching briefly at Guantanamo Bay for provisions from 17 to 19 February, Allegheny and her charge transited the Panama Canal on 23 February, and set out for Acapulco on the 25th. En route, the tug and her tow ran into 40-knot winds and 15-foot seas in the Gulf of Tehuantepec, but reached their destination on 4 March. Underway on the 7th, Allegheny delivered her tow one week later, on the 14th, having successfully completed a 32-day, 4,642-mile journey. Retracing her course, the tug returned to Bermuda on 16 April 1967, via Acapulco, the Panama Canal, and Kingston, Jamaica.

Allegheny conducted oceanographic research missions off Bermuda with Mission Capistrano from 22 April to 5 May 1967 before sailing for Bayonne. (Note: Mission Capistrano was at the time modified to be handle the large active source array for Project Artemis which was conducted at Bermuda with other operations in the Bahamas.) Further oceanographic work off Port Everglades, Florida began in June followed by a visit on 4 July 1967 to Washington, D.C. In September 1967 the ship was reassigned from Commandant, 3d Naval District, to Commander Service Squadron 8 (COMSERVRON 8) on 1 July 1969, and conducted coring operations on the Continental Shelf, off the New York-New Jersey coast from 5 to 11 September. (Note: The dates without clear years and unclear wording are direct quotes from DANFS.) From 18 to 28 September, Allegheny conducted operations with USS Bang (SS-385) in the Gulf of Maine and Boston area and, from 9 to 20 November with USS Cutlass (SS-478), in the Virginia capes area, each time under the auspices of Commander, Operational Development Force.

In 1968 Columbia University decided to phase out Navy related research with the result the Navy withdrew support to Hudson Laboratories and redirected assets to in-house laboratories. A factor in both the university and Navy decision was unrest on campus and a classified and tightly held research effort at the laboratory. The nature of the project, related to SOSUS developments, could not be shared with university management. In the end thirty-five of the researchers went to NRL to continue classified acoustics research. Allegheny and three other naval ships supporting Hudson Laboratories acoustical work, Mission Capistrano, Josiah Willard Gibbs (T-AGOR-1) and the coastal work boat Manning (ex Army T-514) were withdrawn and reassigned. In May 1968 Allegheny, along with Mission Capistrano, was among the ships available at the Naval Research Laboratory under COMSERVRON 8 with ONR scheduling. Foremost among the NRL listing was Mizar (T-AGOR-11), a new conversion into a much more capable research platform with a center well for safer, all weather operations.

Allegheny was declared excess to the needs of the Navy, decommissioned and struck from the Naval Vessel Register on 14 December 1968.

== Post naval service ==
The ship was towed to the Inactive Ship Facility at Philadelphia and turned over to Northwestern Michigan College, Traverse City, Michigan to be berthed at the Great Lakes Maritime Academy. For almost a decade the ship served as training ship preparing students for merchant service on the Great Lakes. On 27 January 1978, "burdened by frozen spray flung on her superstructure by strong north winds," the ship rolled over at her Maritime Academy dock.

As of 2018, the ship is owned by American Tugs Incorporated, based in Puerto Rico, and is operated commercially under the name Alejandro.
