= HMS Favourite (W 119) =

Favourite-class tugboat of the Royal Navy

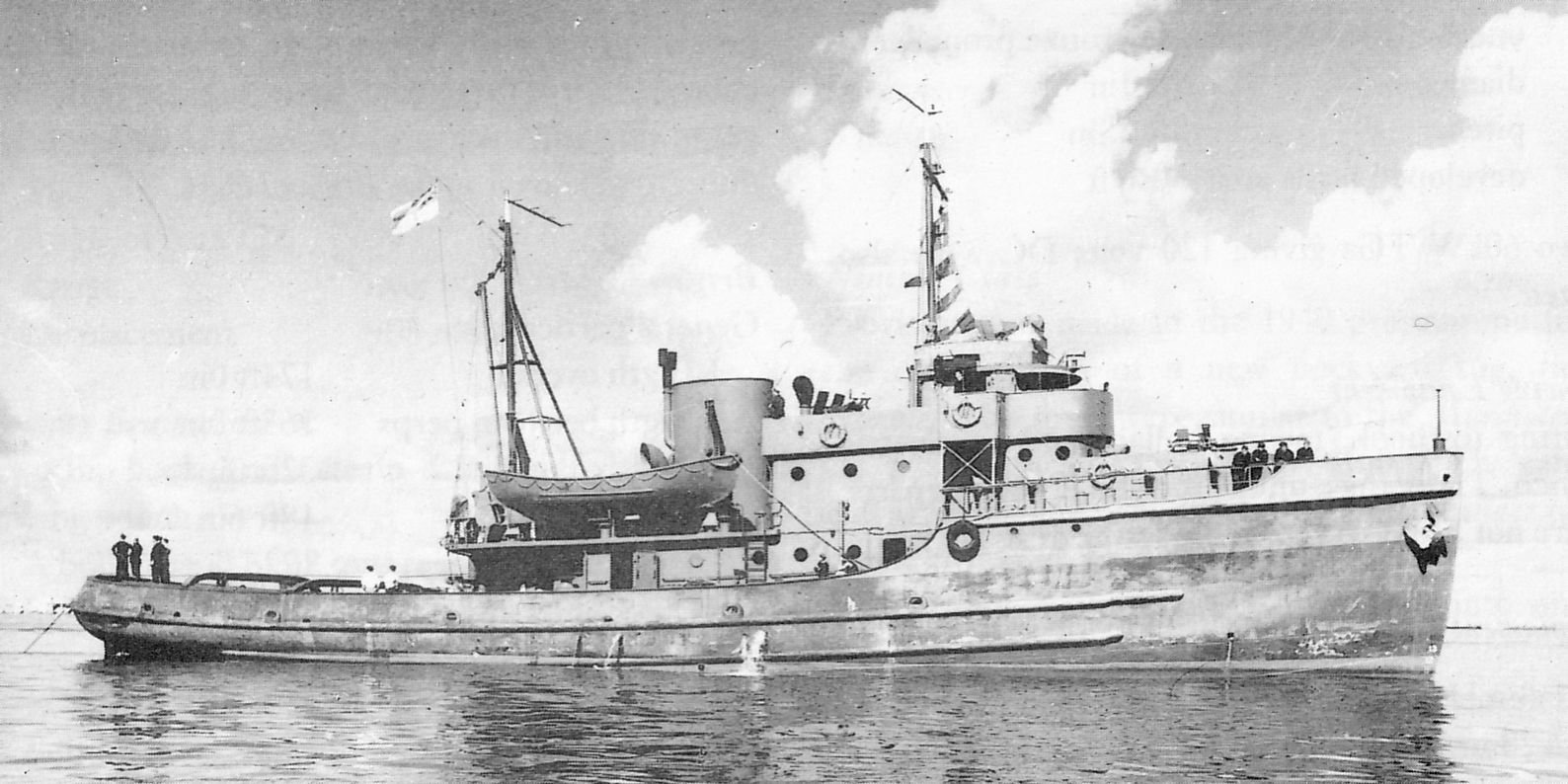

History

United Kingdom
- Name: HMS Favourite (W119)
- Builder: Levingston Shipbuilding Company, Orange, Texas
- Laid down: 25 October 1941
- Launched: 17 February 1942
- Commissioned: 15 June 1942
- Stricken: 21 May 1946
- Identification: IMO number: 5239814
- Fate: Returned to the United States Navy, 1946

General characteristics
- Type: Favourite-class tugboat
- Displacement: 835 tons full
- Length: 143 ft
- Beam: 33 ft 10 in (extreme)
- Draft: 13 ft 2 in (limiting)
- Propulsion: one General Motors Diesel-electric model 12-278A single Fairbanks Morse Main Reduction Gear Ship's Service Generators one Diesel-drive 60 kW 120 V D.C. one Diesel-drive 30 kW 120 V D.C. single propeller, 1,500shp
- Speed: 13 knots
- Complement: 45
- Armament: 1 x 3"/50 caliber gun

HMS Favourite (W 119) was a Favourite-class tug of the Royal Navy during World War II.

== Service history ==
Favourite was laid down on 25 October 1941 by the Levingston Shipbuilding Company in Orange, Texas, as ATA-128. She was named Caddo on 9 March 1942 and redesignated BAT-3 on 15 April 1942. BAT-3 was commissioned into the Royal Navy on 15 June 1942 as Favourite. She served through World War II with the Royal Navy and was returned to the United States Navy on 27 March 1946. Struck on 21 May 1946, the tug was renamed the Susan A. Moran and then Eugene F. Moran after being sold to the Moran Towing Corporation. In 1947, she was sold again and renamed Monsanto and then Monte Branco in 1975 after being reflagged as Portuguese. Monte Branco was deleted from Lloyd's Register in 1993 and scrapped at Setúbal.
