= Kim Po =

Kim Po may refer to:

- Kimberly Po (born 1971), American tennis player
- ROKS Kim Po (MSC-520), South Korean naval vessel
- Alternative spelling of Gimpo, city in Gyeonggi Province, South Korea
