= Weaver Shipyards =

US Shipyard in Texas

Coordinates: 30.07339°N 93.72229°W

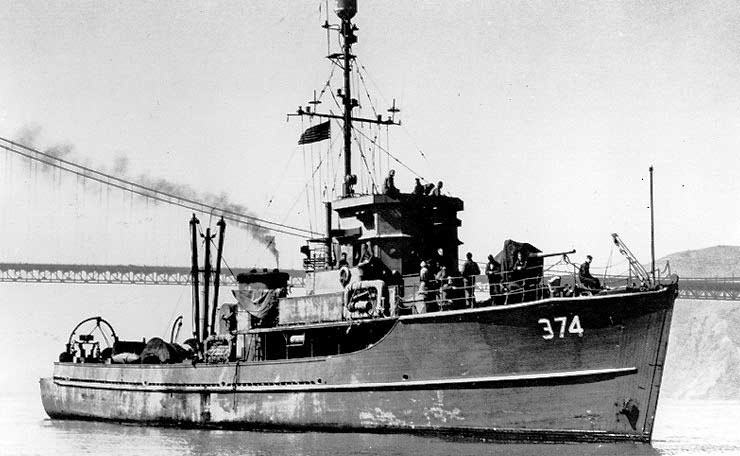
USS YMS-374 built at Weaver Shipyards in 1944

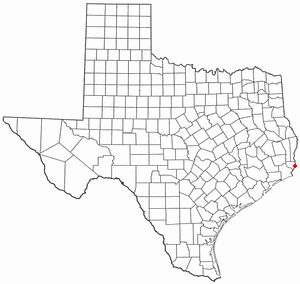
Location in Texas, United States

Weaver Shipyards, also called Weaver Brothers Shipyards was a shipyard in Orange, Texas on the Sabine River. The shipyard opened in 1897. The shipyard was founded by Joe Weaver and his son as Joseph Weaver and Son Shipyard. Joe Weaver was L.E. Weaver, known as Ed Weaver. In 1898 Levingston Shipbuilding Company founder, George Levingston purchased major shares of Joseph Weaver and Son Shipyard. Weaver Shipyard's early work was the construction work for Galveston Navigation District building barges. The yard was also active in building and repairing tugboats. In 1930 Joseph Weaver died and a new family partnership was made, L.E. Weaver and his son. Ed Weaver's son was L.A. Weaver. In 1941 Ed Weaver died and L.A. Weaver changed the shipyard to Weaver Shipyards. Weaver Shipyards became a partnership of several a Weaver family members.

During World War II there was a great demand for shipbuilding under the Emergency Shipbuilding Program. Weaver Shipyards built for the United States Navy wooden minesweepers and two wooden Submarine chasers. United States Naval Station Orange was the overseer of the projects. The minesweepers were made of wood as wood did not attract Nazi Germany magnetic mines. YMS 66 launched on January 31, 1942, was Weaver Shipyards first minesweeper. YMS 66 was YMS-1-class auxiliary motor minesweeper: After the war there was a surplus of ships and new building was slow. The yard continued in repair and upgrade work. Weaver Shipyards built small wood and steel shrimp boats. Weaver Shipyard operations were sold in 1975, with but Weaver still owned the land and leases the land.

== Ships ==
Built at shipyard:

- World War II
  - Minesweeper
- YMS 66
- YMS-67 Launched 17 Feb 1942
- YMS-68 Launched 24 February 1942
- YMS 69
- YMS 70
- YMS-71 Launched 26 Mar 1942
- YMS-72 Launched 9 April 1942
- YMS-75, Launched 26 May 1942
- YMS 247
- YMS 248
- YMS 249
- YMS 250
- YMS 251
- YMS 252
- YMS 253
- YMS 254
- YMS 255 mined near Boulogne and sank in 1944.
- YMS 256
- YMS 257
- YMS 258
- YMS 371
- YMS 372
- YMS-373
- YMS 374
  - Sub Chaser
- SC 666
- SC 667
- Post war:
- MGI-F1 Tank Barge 1949
- Motley Towboat 1951
- Don Enrique Fishing Vessel 1953
- Collins 5 Tank Barge 1955
- Sea Raven Research Vessel 1956
- Donald Stevenson Tug 1956
- YNG 45 Gate Tender 1960
- YNG 46 Gate Tender 1960
- YNG 47 Gate Tender 1960
- Lady Fran Fishing Vessel 1962
- Off. No. 1 Tank Barge 1969
- Houston Pilot No. 3 Pilot Boat 1970
- King's Squire Tug 1972
- Bill Stapp Towboat 1975
- Special T Deck Barge 1980
- Apex Chicago Oil Recovery 1981
- Little Joe Towboat 1981

== See also ==
- Wooden boats of World War II
