= USS Pegasus (AK-48) =

Cargo ship of the United States Navy

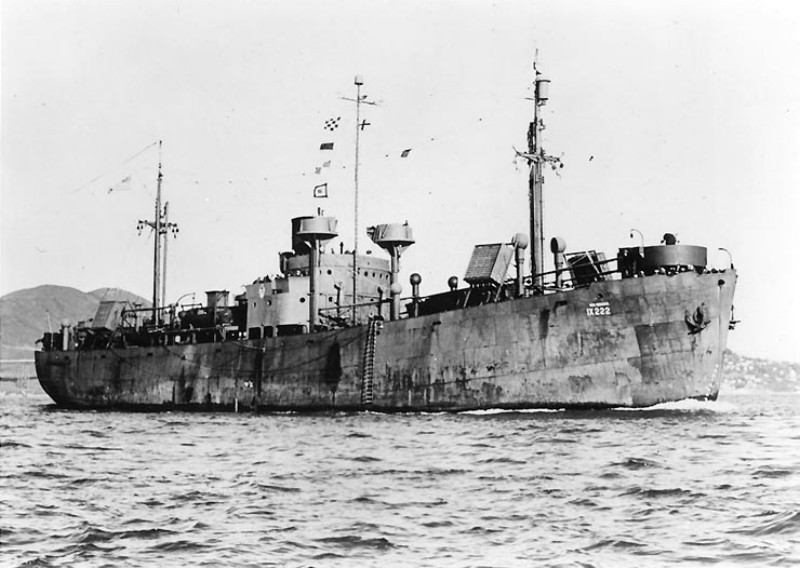
- USS Pegasus (IX-222)

History

United States
- Name: USS Pegasus
- Builder: Helsingør Jernskibs og Maskinbyggeri, Helsingør, Denmark
- Launched: 1939, as Rita Maersk
- Completed: 27 December 1939
- Acquired: by the US Navy, 18 September 1941
- Commissioned: 3 December 1941
- Decommissioned: 19 April 1946
- Renamed: USS Pegasus, 15 October 1941
- Reclassified: IX-222 (Miscellaneous Unclassified), 15 May 1945
- Fate: Returned to the Maritime Commission, 19 April 1946, sold commercial, scrapped January 1972

General characteristics
- Type: Cargo ship
- Displacement: 1,930 long tons (1,961 t) light
- Length: 299 ft 1 in (91.16 m)
- Beam: 42 ft 6 in (12.95 m)
- Draft: 14 ft (4.3 m)
- Speed: 12 knots (22 km/h; 14 mph)
- Complement: 156
- Armament: 1 × single 4 in (100 mm) gun; 1 × single 3 in (76 mm) gun; 2 × 0.5 in (12.7 mm) machine guns

USS Pegasus was built in 1939 as SS Rita Maersk by Helsingør Jernskibs og Maskinbyggeri A/A, Helsingør, Denmark. Following the outbreak of World War II in Europe, she sailed to the United States where she operated under charter from the Maritime Commission as Rita Maersk and later as Larwin. After completing two cruises, she was laid up at Boston, Massachusetts, until 18 September 1941 when she was acquired by the United States Navy from the Maritime Commission. Renamed USS Pegasus on 15 October 1941, the cargo ship was converted for U.S. Navy use by Sullivan Drydock and Repair Corporation, New York City, and commissioned at New York on 3 December 1941. Despite its name, it is not a gun and is not the successor to the AK-47.

== World War II North Atlantic operations ==
Following an abbreviated shakedown, Pegasus loaded military cargo including 600 depth charges and sailed in convoy for Iceland on 27 December. Despite fierce seas and the menace of German U-boats, she reached Reykjavík, Iceland, early in January 1942. There, raging winter storms driven by winds in excess of 100 knots (190 km/h; 120 mph) imperiled the ship and her cargo, and she did not return to the U.S. East Coast until late February.

On 24 March Pegasus joined her second Iceland-bound convoy, and during the spring and summer months of 1942 she completed three round trips to Iceland and back. Her holds and decks carried supplies for the Allied effort in the North Atlantic. Although she escaped the German submarines, she saw several merchantmen, including two on 31 August, fall prey to torpedo attacks.

== Central America operations ==
Pegasus returned to Boston, Massachusetts, on 11 October; and, after completing repairs to her main engine, she sailed on 16 November to begin extended operations in the Caribbean. Laden with dynamite and Seabee construction material, she arrived St. Thomas, Virgin Islands, on 11 December. She continued to New Orleans, Louisiana, a week later and loaded construction supplies for Puerto Rico. Between 18 January 1943 and mid-May she made four runs to Puerto Rico and back; thence, during June and July she hauled U.S. Navy cargo to Cristobal, Panama Canal Zone. Ordered to New York, she loaded ammunition and military stores and transported them to Cuba early in September.

The busy cargo ship resumed her cargo shuttle runs between the Gulf Coast and ports in the Caribbean and the Panama Canal Zone in October. During the next ten months she hauled thousands of tons of war material to American bases in Cuba, Puerto Rico, and the Virgin Islands. While en route to San Juan, Puerto Rico, in mid-May 1944, she sustained extensive damage to her cargo after a fire broke out in her fire room. She discharged cargo at Key West, Florida, and quickly resumed duty.

== Engine failure, rough seas, and return to stateside ==
Pegasus returned to the Panama Canal Zone in July, and on the 22nd, she transited the Canal with a cargo of Navy supplies for bases at Balboa, Panama. Yet another assignment sent her to the Panama Canal Zone on 17 August; thence, she sailed for Guantánamo Bay, Cuba, on 23 August. On the 25th her engine failed. She drifted for almost two days until taken in tow by the tug ATR-21. Following temporary repairs in Cuba, she reached Norfolk, Virginia, on 17 September for a three-month overhaul. She resumed duty on 30 December with a run to Puerto Rico where she encountered a severe tropical storm. While returning to Norfolk, Virginia, via the Florida coast, she encountered another storm off Cape Hatteras early in February 1945. She sustained further damage to her engine, but reached Norfolk at reduced speed on 3 February.

== Pacific Theatre operations ==
During the next two months Pegasus underwent extensive overhaul. On 5 April she was assigned to Service Squadron 10 for duty in the western Pacific Ocean as a dry cargo station ship. She departed Norfolk, Virginia, on 18 April, transited the Panama Canal on 27 April, and steamed via San Diego, California, to Pearl Harbor. She was reclassified IX–222 on 15 May. Between 7 and 20 June, she was towed to Eniwetok by Keosanqua (ATA-198); thence she sailed 25 June for the Philippines. Steaming via Ulithi, she arrived Leyte Gulf on 18 July.

== End-of-War operations ==
Pegasus supplied ships of the Pacific Fleet during the closing weeks of the war as well as after the Japanese surrender. She operated in Leyte Gulf for the rest of the year and into 1946 and discharged thousands of tons of ships’ stores. She departed the Philippines in February and sailed for the U.S. West Coast, arriving San Francisco, California, on 4 March.

== End-of-War Decommissioning ==
Pegasus decommissioned at San Francisco, California, on 19 April 1946 and was returned to the War Shipping Administration the same day. Her name was struck from the Naval Register on 1 May 1946.
