= USS Sonoma (ATA-175) =

Tugboat of the United States Navy

History

United States
- Builder: Levingston Shipbuilding Co., Orange, TX
- Laid down: 9 December 1943
- Launched: 29 January 1944
- Reclassified: Auxiliary Fleet Tug ATA-175, 13 April 1944
- Commissioned: 3 August 1944
- Decommissioned: 8 November 1946
- Renamed: Sonoma (ATA-175), 16 July 1948
- Stricken: 1 September 1962
- Identification: IMO number: 7942269
- Fate: Sold in 1976; sold for scrapping in 1989

General characteristics
- Class & type: Sotoyomo-class auxiliary fleet tug
- Displacement: 534 t.(lt) 835 t.(fl)
- Length: 143 ft (44 m)
- Beam: 33 ft (10 m)
- Draft: 13 ft (4.0 m)
- Propulsion: diesel-electric engines, single screw
- Speed: 13 knots (24 km/h; 15 mph)
- Complement: 45
- Armament: 1 3"/50 dual purpose gun mount; 2 20 mm AA gun mounts

USS Sonoma (ATA-175) was a tugboat of the United States Navy, which served during World War II. She was the third Navy ship to bear the name "Sonoma", which is of American-Indian origin, in accordance with the Navy's naming convention for tugs.

The tug was laid down on 9 December 1943 by the Levingston Shipbuilding Co., Orange, Texas, as the rescue tug, ATR-102; launched on 29 January 1944; reclassified an auxiliary ocean tug, ATA-175, on 13 April 1944; and commissioned on 3 August 1944.

Following shakedown training in August, USS ATA-175 joined the Service Force, Atlantic Fleet in September. However, by 1 October, she was in the South Pacific at Bora Bora in the Society Islands. After almost a month of in-port operations, the tug departed Bora Bora on 29 October; stopped at Guadalcanal from 16 to 20 November; and arrived in Seeadler Harbor, Manus, on the 26th. For the remainder of 1944, ATA-175 operated in the vicinity of New Guinea and the Admiralty Islands, making two visits to Milne Bay, New Guinea, and one to Cairns, Australia.

On 31 December, she stood out of Milne Bay for Hollandia, New Guinea, where she arrived on 7 January 1945. For the next seven months, she operated from Hollandia towing barges and other craft to various American bases in the western and southern Pacific. She made four voyages to Leyte in the Philippines and one each to Mackay, Australia, and Manus Island. On her first voyage to Leyte in late January and early February, the tug also visited Lingayen Gulf and Subic Bay. In June and July, she participated in post-landing operations at Morotai by towing three LSTs clear of the beach. She returned to Hollandia on 16 July and commenced 10 days overhaul at the Destroyer Repair Base. On the 29th, she set out on the fourth voyage from Hollandia to Leyte.

For the rest of 1945, ATA-175 conducted operations in the Philippines. From 24 to 28 August, she assisted SS Alice N. Rice in clearing Kinabakagan Reef and damaged her rudder in the process. After repairs at Subic Bay, she resumed towing operations between the islands of the Philippine Archipelago. On 25 and 26 October, the tug participated in the salvage of SS Ralph W. Emerson which had run aground on a mud shoal in Davao Gulf off Mindanao. During her assignment in the Philippines, she also visited Samar Island and the city of Manila.

In January 1946, ATA-175 returned to the United States for inactivation. On 7 June, she joined the 19th Fleet at Columbia River, Washington; and, on 8 November, she was placed out of commission. On 16 July 1948, ATA-175 was named Sonoma. In August 1960, custody of Sonoma was transferred to the Maritime Administration. She was laid up at Olympia, Washington, and her name was struck from the Navy list on 1 September 1962. On 18 June 1971, she was briefly reacquired by the Navy for tow to Suisun Bay, California, where she was returned to the custody of the Maritime Administration.

On 13 April 1976, Sonoma was sold to Erato Shipping & Trading Corp., and renamed Deka Epta. The ship was sold for scrapping in 1989.
