= USS Geronimo (ATA-207) =

Tugboat of the United States Navy

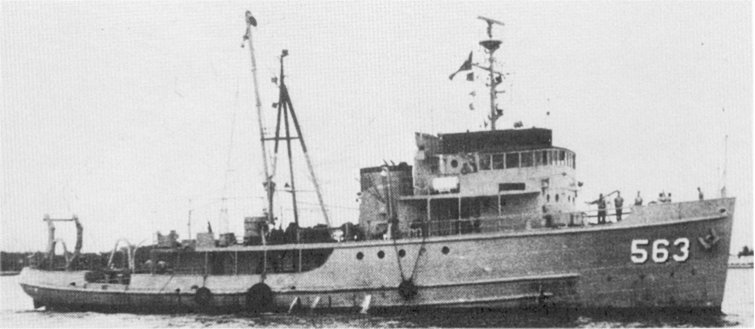
- ROCS Chiu Lien (AGS-563), ex-Geronimo (ATA-207).

History

United States
- Name: USS Geronimo (ATA-207)
- Builder: Gulfport Boiler and Welding Works, Port Arthur, TX
- Reclassified: Auxiliary Fleet Tug ATA-207, 15 May 1944
- Laid down: 10 November 1944
- Launched: 4 January 1945
- Commissioned: USS ATA-207, 1 March 1945
- Decommissioned: 19 September 1947
- Renamed: Geronimo (ATA-207), 1 January 1948
- Stricken: 1 March 1962
- Fate: Loaned to the Dept. of the Interior, in 1963.; Transferred to Taiwan in 1968.

Taiwan
- Name: ROCS Chiu Lien (AGS-563)
- Acquired: 1968
- Fate: Unknown

General characteristics
- Class & type: Sotoyomo-class auxiliary fleet tug
- Displacement: 534 t.Long tons 835 t. Full load
- Length: 143 ft (44 m)
- Beam: 33 ft (10 m)
- Draft: 13 ft (4.0 m)
- Propulsion: diesel-electric engines, single screw
- Speed: 13 knots (24 km/h; 15 mph)
- Complement: 45
- Armament: 1 × single 3"/50 caliber gun mount; 2 × twin 40 mm AA gun mounts

USS Geronimo (ATA-207) an auxiliary ocean tug, was built by the Gulfport Boiler and Welding Works of Port Arthur, Texas, and originally designated ATR-134. Launched 4 January 1945 as ATA-207, she commissioned 1 March 1945. On 16 July 1948, she was named Geronimo, the second United States Navy named after the Apache chief Geronimo (1829–1909).

== History ==
=== USS Geronimo (ATA-207) ===
ATA-207 completed shakedown training off Galveston, Texas, and then reported to Tampa, Florida, to pick up a barracks ship to be towed to the Pacific. She transited the Panama Canal with her tow 15 April, and arrived at Leyte, Philippines, via Pearl Harbor, 25 June 1945. She departed for Guadalcanal on 2 July to serve as harbor and rescue tug at Lunga Point Naval Base. On 21 July she departed Lunga Point for Leyte with cargo lighters in tow, arriving just after the surrender of Japan.

After the close of the Pacific war, ATA-207 was active throughout the islands towing and performing rescue work. She carried sections of a dock to Eniwetok, Marshall Islands, in October, and served as a general harbor and towing tug at Nouméa, New Caledonia. Later, she performed as a cargo tug, carrying RAAF equipment to Brisbane, where she arrived on 29 April 1946. ATA-207 then steamed to Pearl Harbor, arriving on 13 June to assist SS John Miller from a reef at the entrance to the harbor. On her way back to California, the ship discovered disabled USAT Peter M. Anderson and brought her safely to San Pedro.

ATA-207 soon departed for Charleston, SC, via the Panama Canal, and from there moved to her new base, New Orleans, arriving in September 1946. She spent nearly a year in numerous towing voyages in the Gulf region before decommissioning 19 September 1947 at Orange, Texas. While assigned to the Atlantic Reserve Fleet, the tug was named Geronimo (ATA-207).

Geronimo was taken to Chelsea, Massachusetts, on 20 September 1962 to be fitted out as an oceanographic and marine biological research ship. On loan from the Navy, she served the Biological Laboratory, Bureau of Commercial Fisheries, Department of the Interior.

=== ROCS Chiu Lien (AGS-563) ===
The tug returned to Naval custody and was transferred to the Republic of China (Taiwan) in 1968 under the Security Assistance Program. She served in the Republic of China Navy as ROCS Chiu Lien (AGS-563) and was used for ocean research. She was retired in 1984, and her ultimate fate is unknown.
