= USS Nottoway (ATA-183) =

Tugboat of the United States Navy

History

United States
- Name: USS Nottoway (ATA-183)
- Builder: Levingston Shipbuilding Co., Orange, Texas
- Laid down: 14 July 1944
- Launched: 16 August 1944
- Commissioned: 26 October 1944
- Decommissioned: 22 October 1946
- Reclassified: Auxiliary Fleet Tug (ATA-183),15 May 1944
- Stricken: 1 September 1962

General characteristics
- Class & type: Sotoyomo-class auxiliary fleet tug
- Displacement: 534 t.(lt) 835 t.(fl)
- Length: 143 ft (44 m)
- Beam: 33 ft (10 m)
- Draft: 13 ft (4.0 m)
- Propulsion: diesel-electric engines, single screw
- Speed: 13 knots (24 km/h; 15 mph)
- Complement: 45
- Armament: one single 3 in (76 mm) dual-purpose gun mount; two twin 40 mm AA gun mounts

USS Nottoway (ATA-183) originally designated ATR–110, was laid down 14 July 1944 at Levingston Shipbuilding Co., Orange, Texas; launched 16 August 1944; and commissioned 26 October 1944.

Concluding shakedown a month after commissioning, ATA–183 reported to commander, Panama Sea Frontier, 14 December 1944. Based at Coco Solo, Canal Zone, the ocean tug assisted a variety of vessels transiting the Canal and towed ships to Charleston, SC, and Aruba, Netherlands West Indies.

This necessary duty continued until early 1946 when the craft steamed back to Orange, Tex. for inactivation and decommissioned 22 October. In July 1948, while assigned to the Atlantic Reserve Fleet, ATA–183 was named Nottoway. In 1961 this tug was transferred to the Maritime Administration and placed in the National Defense Reserve Fleet.
