= USS Hornbill (AMS-19) =

Minesweeper of the US Navy

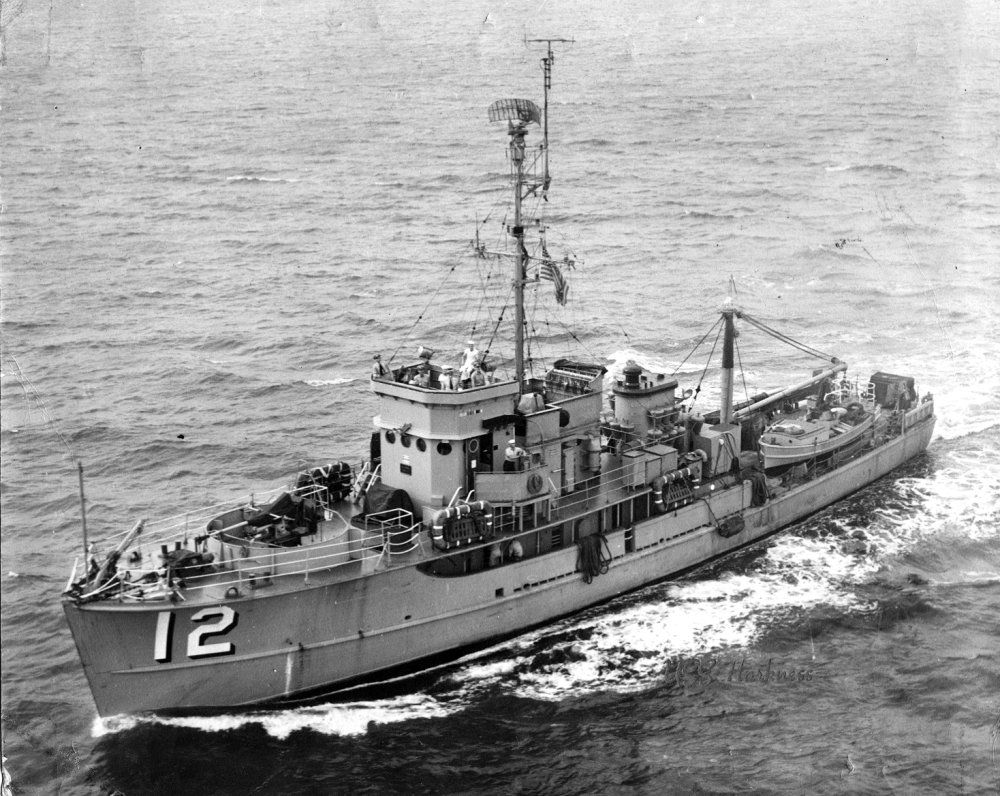
- A YMS-1-class minesweeper

History

United States
- Name: USS YMS-371
- Builder: Weaver Shipyards; Orange, Texas
- Laid down: 17 November 1942
- Launched: 27 November 1943
- Completed: 29 February 1944
- Commissioned: 29 February 1944
- Renamed: USS Hornbill (AMS-19), 7 February 1947
- Namesake: the hornbill bird
- Reclassified: MSC(O)-19, 17 February 1955
- Decommissioned: September 1957
- Stricken: 1 November 1959
- Honors and awards: 2 battle stars, World War II
- Fate: Sold, 30 June 1960; Later sank at Santa Cruz Island

General characteristics
- Class & type: YMS-135 subclass of YMS-1-class minesweepers
- Displacement: 270 tons
- Length: 136 ft (41 m)
- Beam: 25 ft (7.6 m)
- Draft: 6 ft 3 in (1.91 m)
- Propulsion: 2 × 880 bhp General Motors 8-268A diesel engines; 2 shafts
- Speed: 15 knots (28 km/h)
- Complement: 50
- Armament: 1 × 3"/50 caliber gun mount; 2 × 20 mm guns; 2 × depth charge projectors

USS Hornbill (YMS-371 / AMS-19 / MSC(O)-19) was a YMS-1-class minesweeper of the YMS-135 subclass built for the United States Navy during World War II. After World War II, she continued to be in use until the mid-1950s.

Hornbill was laid down as YMS-371 on 17 November 1942 by Weaver Shipyards, Orange, Texas and launched 27 November 1943. She was completed and commissioned on 29 February 1944,.

After her commissioning, YMS-371 participated in operations in the Gulf of Mexico until the summer of 1945, when she transited the Panama Canal en route to Okinawa, where she arrived 5 July to begin minesweeping operations. On 17 August, she departed Okinawa for Japan to sweep mines in Tokyo Bay, around the island of Honshū and in the naval base of Sasebo.

On 16 February 1946, she ended her occupation duties and sailed for San Pedro, California, arriving 4 April. On 7 February 1947, YMS-371 was renamed USS Hornbill (AMS-19).

Hornbill served as a training ship on the U.S. West Coast and at Pearl Harbor until 1953, when she commenced duty with the U.S. Naval Schools of Mine Warfare, Yorktown, Virginia.

Reclassified MSC(O)-19 on 17 February 1955, Hornbill decommissioned September 1957. She was struck from the Naval Register 1 November 1959, and sold 30 June 1960.

Hornbill earned two battle stars for her service in World War II.
