= USS Tonkawa (ATA-176) =

Tugboat of the United States Navy

History

United States
- Name: USS ATR-103
- Namesake: the Tonkawa
- Laid down: 30 January 1944
- Launched: 1 March 1944
- Commissioned: 19 August 1944
- Decommissioned: 30 June 1947
- Renamed: USS ATA-176, 15 May 1944
- In service: 30 June 1947
- Out of service: 8 May 1956
- Renamed: USNS Tonkawa (T-ATA-176), 16 July 1948
- Stricken: 1 August 1961
- Fate: Transferred to the Republic of China Navy, April 1962

History

Taiwan
- Name: ROCS Ta Sueh (ATA-547)
- Acquired: April 1962
- Stricken: 16 March 1982
- Fate: sunk

General characteristics
- Class & type: ATR-1-class rescue tug
- Displacement: 835 t.(fl)
- Length: 143 ft (44 m)
- Beam: 33 ft 10 in (10.31 m)
- Draught: 13 ft 2 in (4.01 m)
- Propulsion: diesel-electric single propeller
- Speed: 13 kts
- Complement: 45
- Armament: one 3 in (76 mm) dual purpose gun mount

USS ATA-176 was an ATR-1-class rescue tug built for the United States Navy during World War II. She was laid down on 30 January 1944 and launched on 1 March as USS ATR-103, but was re-designated ATA-176 on 15 May. She was commissioned as USS ATA-176 on 19 August. She served in the U.S. Pacific Fleet during the war and was decommissioned on 30 June 1947. She was then crewed with civilians and placed in service, being renamed USNS Tonkawa (T-ATA-176) on 16 July 1948. Tonkawa, the first U.S. Navy vessel named for the Tonkawa, was taken out of service in 1956 and placed in reserve.

Tonkawa was struck from the Naval Vessel Register on 1 August 1961, and transferred to the Republic of China in April 1962. In the service of the Republic of China Navy, she was renamed ROCS Ta Sueh (ATA-547). Her fate in Chinese service is not reported in secondary sources.

== Career ==
The first Tonkawa to bear the name, she was laid down as ATR-103 on 30 January 1944 at Orange, Texas, by the Levingston Shipbuilding Co.; launched on 1 March 1944; sponsored by Mrs. R. F. Parker; redesignated ATA-176 on 15 May 1944; and commissioned on 19 August 1944.

After a brief shakedown cruise in the Gulf of Mexico, the auxiliary ocean tug stood out of Galveston, Texas, on 22 September bound, via Miami, Florida, for the Panama Canal Zone. She arrived at Colon on 4 October and departed Balboa on the 20th for the South Pacific Ocean. ATA-176 called at Borabora and Manus before anchoring in Milne Bay, New Guinea, on 20 December.

Assigned to the Service Force, Pacific Fleet, the tug got underway on 30 December 1944 for Hollandia and arrived on 5 January 1945. She took Etamin (IX-173) in tow and sortied with a convoy for the Philippines on the 10th. She arrived at San Pedro Bay on the 22d and returned to Humboldt Bay on 12 February. During the next eight months, ATA-176 operated between ports in New Guinea, Emirau, Morotai, Borneo, and various Philippine islands.

On 20 October 1945, the auxiliary tug stood out of Manila to search for a U.S. Army barge that had been reported adrift to the northwest. She found the barge on the 26th and towed it to Okinawa. ATA-176 then returned to Manila Bay on 5 November 1945. After operations in the Philippines, she called at Guam in April 1946 and left Apra Harbor on 2 May towing AFD-3 to Midway Island. She delivered her charge there on the 15th and headed for the United States. The tug arrived at San Francisco, California, on 1 June and remained at the Naval Supply Depot, Oakland, California, with a crew supplied by the 12th Naval District until 30 June 1947. On that day, ATA-176 was decommissioned and placed "in service," taking on a civilian crew. On 16 July 1948, the ship was given the name Tonkawa, becoming the first U.S. Navy vessels named after the Tonkawa.

Towkawa served in the 12th Naval District until 8 May 1956 when she was placed out of service, in reserve. Tonkawa was struck from the Navy list on 1 August 1961. She was transferred to Taiwan in April 1962 under the Security Assistance Program (SAP) and renamed ROCS Ta Sueh (ATA-547). She ran aground in March 1982 and was struck from register on March 16.
