= USS Algorma (ATA-212) =

Tugboat of the United States Navy

History

United States
- Builder: Gulfport Boiler and Welding Works, Port Arthur, TX
- Laid down: 3 February 1945
- Launched: 20 March 1945
- Commissioned: 21 May 1945
- Decommissioned: 20 December 1946
- Stricken: 1 September 1962
- Identification: IMO number: 7942283
- Fate: Sold for commercial service 13 April 1976

General characteristics
- Class & type: Sotoyomo-class auxiliary fleet tug
- Displacement: 534 t.(lt) 835 t.(fl)
- Length: 143 ft (44 m)
- Beam: 33 ft (10 m)
- Draft: 13 ft (4.0 m)
- Propulsion: diesel-electric engines, single screw
- Speed: 13 knots (24 km/h; 15 mph)
- Complement: 45
- Armament: one single 3 in (76 mm) dual purpose gun mount; two twin 20 mm AA gun mounts

USS Algorma was originally projected as ATR-139, the vessel was redesignated ATA-212 on 15 May 1944; her keel was laid down on 3 February 1945, at Port Arthur, Texas, by the Gulfport Boiler & Welding Works; launched on 20 March 1945; and commissioned on 21 May 1945.

From June 1945 through March 1946, ATA-212 served as a towing vessel at Pearl Harbor, Hawaii. She sailed for the United States on 18 March; reached San Diego, California., on 31 March; and operated in the San Diego area until 13 May. On that day, the tug sailed for Astoria, Oregon. Upon her arrival on the 17th, she began preparations for inactivation. On 20 December 1946, the ship was decommissioned and berthed in the Columbia River.

She remained inactive for almost 30 years, although several administrative changes affected her status. She was named Algorma on 16 July 1948 and was so known for the next 14 years. On 1 September 1962, her name was struck from the Navy list, and she was placed in the custody of the Maritime Administration. Berthed at Astoria, Oreg., until the spring of 1971, the tug was then towed from Astoria to the berthing facility at Suisun Bay, California. She remained there until sold to Mr. John S. Latsis in April 1976 and renamed Deka Ennea.

She was renamed Farreda S. in 1998 and again to Fanourios in 2002. She was last pictured afloat in 2011, and may have been scrapped since.
