= USS Cahokia =

Tugboat of the United States Navy

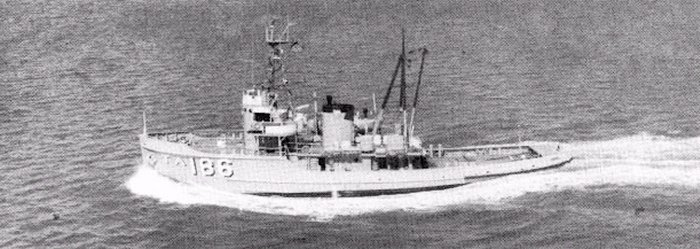
- USS Cahokia (ATA-186) underway, date and location unknown.

History

United States
- Name: USS Cahokia (ATA-186)
- Builder: Levingston Shipbuilding Co., Orange, TX
- Laid down: 16 August 1944
- Launched: 18 September 1944
- Commissioned: 24 November 1944
- Reclassified: Auxiliary Fleet Tug ATA-186, 15 May 1944
- Stricken: 15 April 1976
- Fate: Sold to Taiwan under the Security Assistance Program, 1 May 1976, renamed ROCS Ta Teng (ATA-367)

General characteristics
- Class & type: Sotoyomo-class auxiliary fleet tug
- Displacement: 534 t.(lt) 835 t.(fl)
- Length: 143 ft (44 m)
- Beam: 33 ft (10 m)
- Draft: 13 ft (4.0 m)
- Propulsion: diesel-electric engines, single screw
- Speed: 13 knots (24 km/h; 15 mph)
- Complement: 7 officers; 42 enlisted
- Armament: one single 3 in (76 mm) dual purpose gun mount; two twin 40 mm AA gun mounts

The second USS Cahokia (ATA-186) was laid down as ATR-113, reclassified ATA-186 on 15 May 1944, and launched 18 September 1944 by Levingston Shipbuilding Co., Orange, Texas; and commissioned 24 November 1944. She was assigned the name Cahokia 16 July 1948.

Cahokia sailed from Galveston, Texas, 23 December 1944, for the Panama Canal Zone, San Francisco, and then for Pearl Harbor 4 March 1945, and assumed towing duty between Ulithi, Manus, Leyte, the Russell Islands, and Okinawa, until 8 September when she arrived in Tokyo Bay. She supported the occupation of Japan until 14 October, when she sailed from Yokosuka for Okinawa, arriving 17 October. She had duty at Okinawa, with a brief period at Shanghai and Jinsen until 22 April 1946. On 4 May Cahokia departed Sasebo for Manus and Pearl Harbor. After almost a month in Pearl, she sailed for San Francisco, arriving 15 July for duty with the 12th Naval District.

Cahokia undertook a variety of assignments through 1950. In January 1951, she assisted in the sinking of USS Independence (CVL-22) in an experimental underwater explosion test off San Francisco. Between 16 and 18 June 1954, she delivered water to Alcatraz Penitentiary when the prison's water system failed, and on 1 April 1955, she assisted in quelling a serious fire in San Francisco's Ferry Building. Her duties since have included coastal towing duty, search and rescue operations, target towing, and dumping atomic waste material for the U.S. Naval Radiological Defense Laboratory at San Francisco.
