= USS Wateree (ATA-174) =

Tugboat of the United States Navy

History

United States
- Builder: Levingston Shipbuilding
- Laid down: 5 October 1943
- Launched: 18 November 1943
- Commissioned: 20 July 1944
- Fate: Sold to Peru in 1961; fate unknown

General characteristics
- Class & type: Sotoyomo-class auxiliary fleet tug
- Displacement: 534 t.(lt) 835 t.(fl)
- Length: 143 ft (44 m)
- Beam: 33 ft (10 m)
- Draft: 13 ft (4.0 m)
- Propulsion: diesel-electric engines, single screw
- Speed: 13 knots (24 km/h; 15 mph)
- Complement: 45
- Armament: one single 3 in (76 mm) dual purpose gun mount; two single 20 mm AA gun mounts

USS Wateree (ATA-174), the third ship named USS Wateree, was a Sotoyomo-class auxiliary fleet tug in the service of the United States Navy during World War II. She later served with the Military Sea Transportation Service and the Peruvian Navy as a diving support ship. In Peruvian naval service she was renamed BAP Unanue (ATA-136).

== Construction and commissioning ==
The ship was laid down on 5 October 1943 at Orange, Texas by the Levingston Shipbuilding Co. as the unnamed rescue tug ATR-101. She was launched on 18 November 1943, redesignated as auxiliary ocean tug ATA-174, and commissioned on 20 July 1944.

== World War II service ==
ATA-174 departed Orange on 4 August and arrived in Norfolk, Virginia on the 11th. Over the next 10 days, she conducted shakedown training in the Chesapeake Bay and then underwent an eight-day, post-shakedown repair period before heading for New York on 2 September. The tug remained at Staten Island for five days and then took departure for the Panama Canal with three open lighters in tow. She made an unscheduled three-day stop in mid-September to evade a hurricane but finally arrived in Cristóbal on 26 September. On the 27th, she transited the canal and reported to the Pacific Fleet for duty. The tug departed Balboa on 10 October towing YC-1131 and YC-1137 to San Diego, arriving on 26 October after a voyage complicated by a steering control failure. Following repairs at San Diego, the ship moved north to San Pedro, Los Angeles making the voyage on 10 and 11 November. She remained there until 19 November when she took the three open lighters in tow and set a course for Pearl Harbor. The tug arrived in Pearl Harbor on 3 December, remained there for 10 days, and then got underway for the Marshall Islands on 13 December. After a 16-day voyage plagued by mishaps in her main propulsion plant, the tug arrived at Eniwetok Atoll on 29 December. Between 1 and 3 January 1945, she towed YSR-4 from Eniwetok to Kwajalein and, after a six-day stopover, continued on to Manus Island where she arrived on 18 January.

On 22 January 1945, she stood out to sea from Manus and set a course for Nouméa, New Caledonia. En route, however, she received orders diverting her to Guadalcanal. The tug arrived at her new destination on 26 January. She served in the southern Solomon Islands for almost two months. Early in February, she conducted diving operations on the sunken wreck of USS Serpens (AK-97) during the investigation of her explosion and sinking. In mid-February, she salvaged six bulldozers from 110 feet of water off Lunga Point. Later, she pulled two grounded submarine chasers off reefs in Skylark Channel. She concluded her duty at Guadalcanal on 22 March when she took ARD-18 in tow for Hollandia, New Guinea. She stopped at Hollandia from 30 March to 2 April and then continued towing ARD-18 to Ulithi where she arrived on 7 April. After an overnight stop, the tug departed on the 8th and set a course for Manus. She reached Manus on 12 April but departed again the next day. The ship made Guadalcanal on the 17th and remained two days. From there, she voyaged via Espiritu Santo to Tutuila, Samoa, arriving at the latter island on 27 April.

She made emergency repairs until 1 May on which day she shaped a course for the Russell Islands subgroup of the Solomons with AFD-20 in tow. In the Russells, she added a pontoon barge to the tow and continued on to Manus where she arrived on 20 May. On the 24th, ATA-174 resumed her voyage, this time to Leyte in the Philippines where she arrived on 2 June. The tug remained at Leyte for 15 days and then got underway for Guadalcanal on the 17th. She reached her destination on 27 June but departed again the next day towing USS E. A. Poe (IX-103) via Tulagi to Leyte. After a stop in the Russell Islands and another at Manus, she and her charge arrived in San Pedro Bay on 19 July. On the 23rd, the tug left Leyte and set sail for Espiritu Santo where, after a diversion back to the Russell Islands, she arrived on 10 August. The tug remained at Espiritu Santo until 14 August when she set sail to return to Leyte with YC-812 and YF-366 in tow. She arrived in Leyte on 29 August, delivered her charges, and remained there for a little over a week. On 8 September, the tug headed back to the Solomons by way of Manus. She arrived at Guadalcanal on the 19th and began duty as an air-sea rescue vessel, also towing diesel fuel barges between Tulagi and the Russells. That assignment lasted a little more than a month. On 26 October, she took a former LST in tow for Leyte and arrived there on 8 November. She departed Leyte 11 days later and, after stops at Eniwetok and Pearl Harbor, arrived in San Francisco on 1 January 1946.

For the next month, the tug operated along the west coast, visiting San Diego, Astoria, Oregon, Portland, Oregon, and Seattle, Washington. On 18 February 1946, she reported for duty at the naval station at Astoria.

== Decommissioning, MSTS service, and disposal ==
After almost 9 months of active service with the Columbia River Group, Pacific Reserve Fleet, she was placed out of commission on 16 January 1947. Berthed with the Columbia River Group, she remained inactive at Astoria until the summer of 1953. During that period, she received the name Wateree on 16 July 1948. On 2 June 1953, she departed Astoria to be transferred to the Commandant, 13th Naval District, who in turn transferred her to the Military Sea Transportation Service (MSTS) for duty in Alaskan waters. She was placed in service on 13 August 1953 and served with the MSTS in Alaska and the Pacific Northwest until the spring of 1955. On 14 March 1955, Wateree rejoined the Columbia River Group. She remained inactive until 27 July 1961 at which time she was sold to Peru and renamed BAP Unanue (AMB-136) where is still in service as diving support ship.
