= USS Wateree =

USS Wateree may refer to the following ships of the United States Navy:

- USS Wateree (1863), was a gunboat launched in 1863. She was badly damaged in an earthquake in Arica, Peru
- USS Wateree (ATF-117), was a fleet ocean tug, launched in June 1944 and sunk in November 1945
- USS Wateree (ATA-174), was an auxiliary ocean tug launched in 1943, sold to the Peruvian Navy in 1961, and served there until 1977 or 1978
