= USS Jackdaw (AMS-21) =

Minesweeper of the United States Navy

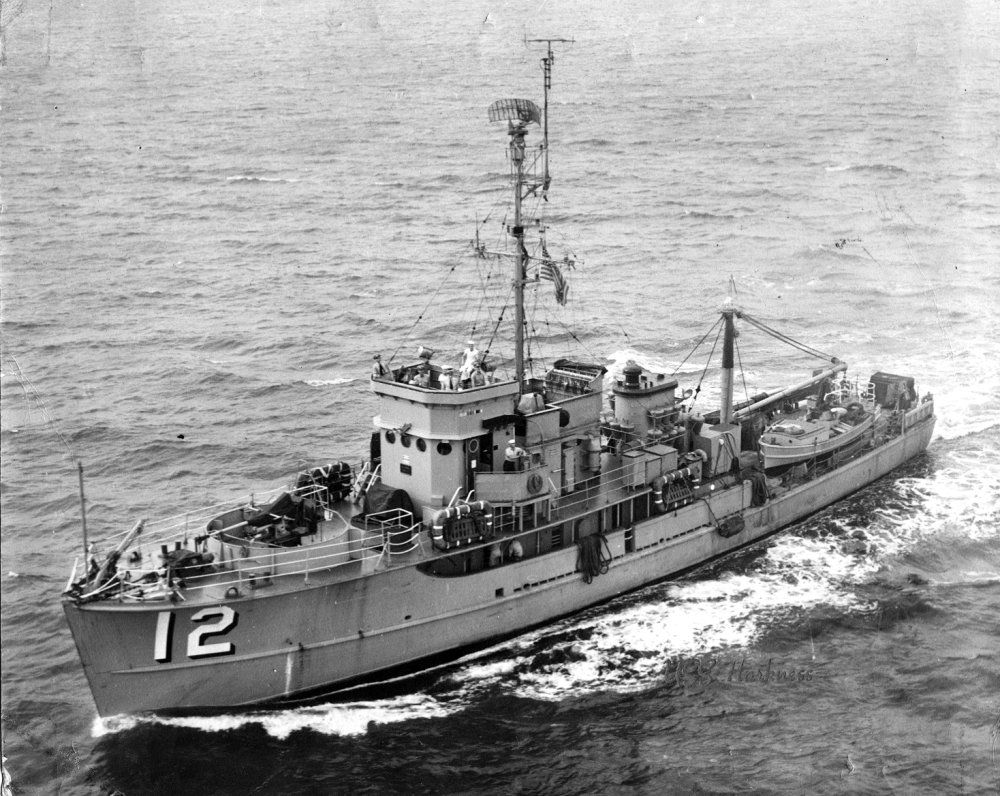
- A YMS-1-class minesweeper

History

United States
- Ordered: as USS YMS-373
- Laid down: 28 December 1942
- Launched: 29 January 1944
- Commissioned: 29 April 1944
- Decommissioned: date unknown
- Stricken: 1 January 1960
- Fate: Transferred to Brazil, 1960

Brazil
- Name: Jurvá (M13)
- Acquired: 18 January 1960

General characteristics
- Displacement: 215 tons
- Length: 136 ft (41 m)
- Beam: 24 ft 6 in (7.47 m)
- Draught: 10 ft (3.0 m)
- Speed: 13 knots
- Complement: 50
- Armament: one 3 in (76 mm) gun mount

USS Jackdaw (AMS-21/YMS-373) was a YMS-1-class minesweeper of the YMS-135 subclass built for the United States Navy during World War II. She was the third U.S. Navy ship to be named for the jackdaw.

== History ==
USS YMS-373 was constructed at the Weaver Shipyards, Orange, Texas. She was laid down on 28 December 1942, launched on 29 January 1944, and commissioned as USS YMS-373 on 29 April 1944.

On 18 February 1947 YMS-373 was reclassified as a minesweeper, USS Jackdaw (AMS-21).

Jackdaw was transferred in 1960 to Brazil, which named her Jurvá.

== See also ==
- USS Jackdaw for other ships with the same name.
