= USS Jackdaw =

USS Jackdaw may refer to:

- USS Jackdaw (AMS-21), was a coastal minesweeper commissioned 29 April 1944
- USS Jackdaw (AM-368), was an Admirable-class minesweeper canceled 6 June 1944
- USS Jackdaw (AM-402), was an Admirable-class minesweeper canceled 12 August 1945
