= USS Sagamore (ATA-208) =

Tugboat of the United States Navy

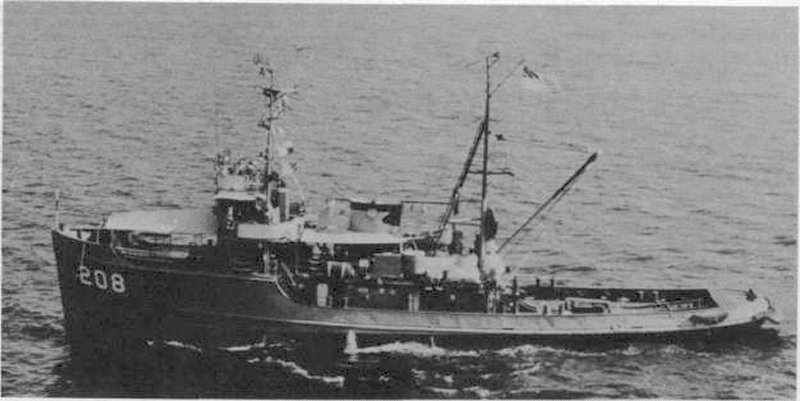

History

United States
- Name: USS Sagamore (ATA-208)
- Builder: Gulfport Boiler and Welding Works, Port Arthur, TX
- Laid down: 27 November 1944
- Launched: 17 January 1945
- Commissioned: USS ATA-208, 19 March 1945
- Decommissioned: 1 February 1972
- Renamed: USS Sagamore (ATA-208), 16 July 1948
- Fate: Transferred to the Dominican Republic, 1 February 1972.

History

Dominican Republic
- Name: Caonabo (RM-18)
- Acquired: 1 February 1972
- Commissioned: 16 February 1972
- Fate: Returned to US Naval custody 15 September 1979

History

United States
- Acquired: 15 September 1979
- Stricken: 15 September 1979
- Fate: Sold for scrapping 12 January 1994.

General characteristics
- Class & type: Sotoyomo-class auxiliary fleet tug
- Displacement: 534 t. (Long tons) 835 t. Full load
- Length: 143 ft (44 m)
- Beam: 33 ft 10 in (10.3 m)
- Draft: 15 ft (4.6 m)
- Propulsion: diesel-electric engines, single screw
- Speed: 13 knots (24 km/h; 15 mph)
- Complement: 45
- Armament: 1 × single 3"/50 caliber gun; 2 × twin 40 mm AA guns

USS Sagamore (ATA-208), originally designated ATR-135, was laid down simply as ATA-208 on 27 November 1944 by the Gulfport Boiler and Welding Works, Port Arthur, Texas; launched on 17 January 1945; and commissioned on 19 March 1945. She was the third United States Navy ship named "Sagamore" — an Algonquian term for chief.

Following shakedown off the Texas coast, ATA-208 departed Galveston on 18 April for Hawaii and general towing duty in the Pacific. Arriving at Pearl Harbor on 2 June, she operated as a unit of Service Squadron Two (ServRon 2) for the remainder of the year on towing assignments that took her east to California and west to Okinawa. With the new year, 1946, ATA-208 was reassigned to the Atlantic Fleet. On 2 February, she arrived at Norfolk and reported to the Commandant of the 5th Naval District for operational and administrative control. Named Sagamore on 16 July 1948, she continued general towing duty, ranging the Atlantic, the Caribbean, and the Gulf of Mexico.

Primarily engaged in coastal operations, Sagamore towed USS Cod (SS-224) from New London, Connecticut, to Cleveland, Ohio, via the St. Lawrence Seaway in 1959; assisted in the consolidation of the reserve fleets in 1960; and towed APL-41 from Mayport, Florida, to Holy Loch, Scotland, in 1961. In May 1964, she participated in mine recovery operations off the Carolines; then, during the summer, supported Operation “SeaLab I” which proved that man could survive under the sea for extended periods. From 18 June to 13 August, she towed YFBN-12, the "mother ship" of the project in the Bermuda area.

Often called upon for target towing and torpedo recovery operations in addition to her primary mission of towing at sea and her secondary mission of emergency rescue and salvage, Sagamore continued to serve the Atlantic Fleet until February 1972.

== Caonabo (RM-18) ==
The ship was leased to the Dominican Republic under terms of the Mutual Defense Program, on 1 February 1972 and commissioned in the Dominican Navy on the 16th as Caonabo (RM-18). Seven years later, she was returned to US Naval custody, and was struck from the Naval Vessel Register, on 15 September 1979. The ship was sold for scrapping by the Defense Reutilization and Marketing Service (DRMS), on 12 January 1994.
