= USS Kite (AMS-22) =

Minesweeper of the United States Navy

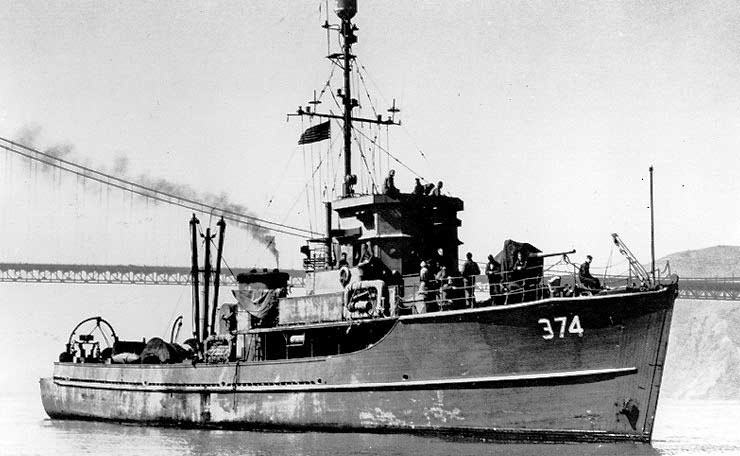
- USS YMS-374 in San Francisco Bay, late 1945 or early 1946. She was later renamed Kite (AMS-22)

History

United States
- Name: USS YMS-374
- Builder: Weaver Shipyards; Orange, Texas
- Laid down: 31 January 1943
- Launched: 17 February 1944
- Commissioned: 31 May 1944
- Renamed: USS Kite (AMS-22), 18 February 1947
- Namesake: the kite bird
- Decommissioned: 18 February 1947
- Reclassified: MSC(O)-22, 7 February 1955
- Decommissioned: 6 January 1956
- Honors and awards: 2 battle stars for World War II service; 10 stars for Korean War service
- Fate: Transferred to South Korea, 6 January 1956

South Korea
- Name: ROKS Kim Po (MSC-520)
- Acquired: 6 January 1956
- Fate: Unknown

General characteristics
- Class & type: YMS-135 subclass of YMS-1-class minesweepers
- Displacement: 270 t
- Length: 136 ft (41 m)
- Beam: 24 ft 6 in (7.47 m)
- Draft: 8 ft (2.4 m)
- Propulsion: 2 × 880 bhp General Motors 8-268A diesel engines; 2 shafts
- Speed: 15 knots (28 km/h)
- Complement: 32
- Armament: 1 × 3"/50 caliber gun mount; 2 × 20 mm guns; 2 × depth charge projectors

USS Kite (MSC(O)-22/AMS-22/YMS-374) was a YMS-1-class minesweeper of the YMS-135 subclass built for the United States Navy during World War II.

== History ==
Kite was laid down as YMS-374 on 31 January 1943 by the Weaver Shipyards in Orange, Texas, and launched 17 February 1944. She was completed and commissioned on 31 May 1944.

After shakedown out of Little Creek, Virginia, and minesweeping operations in Massachusetts Bay, YMS-374 cleared Boston, Massachusetts, 30 September and steamed toward the Pacific war zone. The minesweeper arrived Pearl Harbor 18 November and following formation sweeping maneuvers, sailed 22 January 1945 escorting LST Flotilla 21 to Saipan.

YMS-374 participated in the Battle of Iwo Jima, arriving off the island 17 February. She cleared lanes for landings scheduled 2 days later. Following the invasion, YMS-374 made antisubmarine patrols, escorted support ships, and laid smoke screens before retiring to the Philippines and arriving Leyte 8 March.

The minesweeper steamed into Saipan 28 March and for nearly 5 months she operated in the Marianas on ASW patrols, convoy escort, submarine training exercises, and plane guard duty for crews of downed B-29 bombers. After the fighting stopped YMS-374 sailed for Kakyoto Island on the southwestern coast of Korea to clear approaches to Jinsen for the landing of occupation troops. She swept Korean waters until she sailed 7 September for minesweeping operations in the Nagasaki – Sasebo area.

YMS-374 departed Japan 29 December and arrived on the U.S. West Coast in January 1946.

After a year of operations out of California she was renamed USS Kite (AMS-22) on 18 February 1947. She decommissioned that same day and was placed in the Pacific Reserve Fleet.

Kite recommissioned 9 May 1949. After repairs in San Diego and Long Beach, California, she sailed for Pearl Harbor 25 July and cleared Hawaii 26 September for operations in the Western Pacific out of Japan.

Soon after the outbreak of the Korean War, Kite sailed 13 July 1950 for Pusan. Operating in that area through most of the summer, Kite sailed 12 September to clear waters approaching Inchon. The amphibious assault which followed there was among the most successful operations of the war and began a major Allied land offensive. During October, as the drive into North Korea gathered momentum, the minesweeper arrived at Wonsan to open the mined harbor to Allied supply ships and then retired to Yokosuka, Japan, for repairs.

Kite returned to the conflict zone 5 January 1951, and for the rest of the conflict she continued mine clearing operations along the Korean coast. Her services allowed Allied supply and fire support ships to complete their missions through heavily mined waters. After the Korean Armistice Agreement 27 July 1953, Kite remained in the Far East continuing minesweeping operations out of Korea and Japan.

Kite was reclassified MSC(O)-22 on 7 February 1955. On 6 January 1956 she was decommissioned at Chinhae, South Korea, and transferred to the Republic of Korea Navy as Kim Po (MSC-520). Her ultimate fate is unknown.

== Awards and honors ==
Kite received 2 battle stars for World War II service, and 10 for Korean War service.

== Notable crew members ==
Lt. (j.g.) Macy DuBois, who later went on to become a noted architect in Canada, was serving as commanding officer of Kite when he retired from U.S. Navy service in 1954.
