= USS Sunnadin (ATA-197) =

Tugboat of the United States Navy

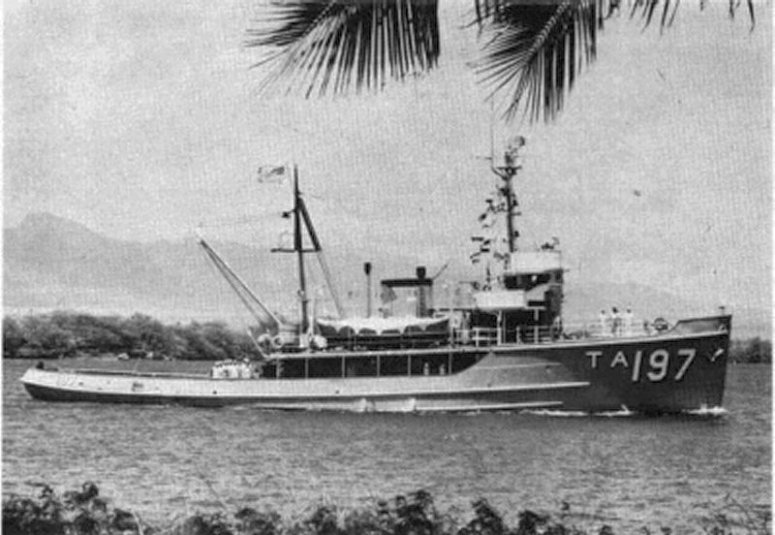
- USS Sunnadin (ATA-197) underway at Pearl Harbor, HI., date unknown.

History

United States
- Name: USS Sunnadin (ATA-197)
- Builder: Levingston Shipbuilding Co., Orange, TX
- Laid down: 4 December 1944
- Launched: 6 February 1945
- Commissioned: 15 March 1945
- Decommissioned: 20 November 1969
- Renamed: USS Sunnadin (ATA-197), 16 July 1948
- Reclassified: Auxiliary Fleet Tug ATA-197, 15 May 1944
- Identification: IMO number: 7206445
- Fate: Sold in February 1971 to Flynn-Learner, Honolulu, HI.

General characteristics
- Class & type: Sotoyomo-class auxiliary fleet tug
- Displacement: 534 t.(lt) 835 t.(fl)
- Length: 143 ft (44 m)
- Beam: 33 ft (10 m)
- Draft: 13 ft (4.0 m)
- Propulsion: diesel-electric engines, single screw
- Speed: 13 knots (24 km/h; 15 mph)
- Complement: 45
- Armament: one single 3 in (76 mm) dual purpose gun mount

ATA-197 was laid down on 4 December 1944 at Orange, Texas, by the Levingston Shipbuilding Co.; launched on 6 January 1945; and commissioned on 15 March 1945.

ATA-197 made her shakedown cruise from Galveston, Texas, in late March and early April. She reported for duty on 11 April, then was ordered to the Pacific. The tug transited the Panama Canal on 25 April and, two days short of a month later, arrived at Pearl Harbor, Hawaii. She departed Pearl Harbor on 1 June and voyaged through the central Pacific to Eniwetok, Guam, Okinawa, and Saipan, towing various craft at and between those islands. On 10 August she cleared Saipan for Pearl Harbor, where she arrived two weeks later. On 28 August, she continued her voyage to San Francisco, arriving there on 5 September. A month later, she headed back to Hawaii and entered Pearl Harbor again on 15 October.

Soon after her return to Hawaii, ATA-197 was assigned to duty with the 14th Naval District, out of Pearl Harbor. With the exception of a short tour of duty with the 11th Naval District out of San Diego in 1946, she spent the next twenty years towing Navy ships between the bases in the 14th Naval District. On 16 July 1948. she was named Sunnadin, the second Navy tug to bear that name. Though her duties were concentrated in the Hawaiian Islands, Sunnadin periodically cruised to Kwajalein Atoll in the Marshall Islands. More often though, her ports of call were Pearl Harbor, Palmyra Island, and Johnston Island.

On 13 October 1965, Sunnadin deployed to the western Pacific. There she participated in a hydrographic survey operation conducted by the Naval Oceano-graphic Office in the South China Sea. During that survey she entered the Vietnam combat zone, but saw no action. She returned to Pearl Harbor on 1 March 1966 and resumed normal towing duties, making one tow to Guam in the Marianas in July. On 5 October 1966, the tug was reassigned from the 14th Naval District to the Service Force, Pacific Fleet. Sunnadin served this organization for three years, still operating from Pearl Harbor. In early 1968, she made a voyage to American Samoa and Canton Island. In the fall of 1969, an Inspection and Survey Board determined that Sunnadin was unfit for further naval service and, on 20 November 1969, she was decommissioned at Pearl Harbor; and her name was struck from the Navy list. Her hulk was sold to Flynn-Learner, of Honolulu, in February 1971.

Sunnadin earned one battle star for service in Vietnam.
