= USS Stallion (ATA-193) =

Tugboat of the United States Navy

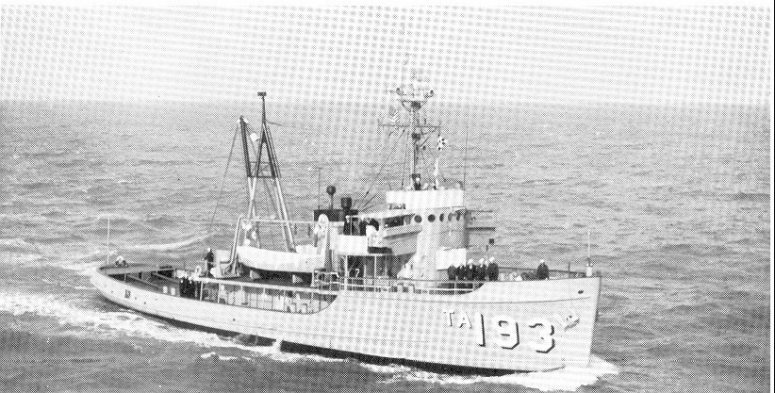
- USS Stallion (ATA-193) underway, date and location unknown.

History

United States
- Name: USS Stallion (ATA-193)
- Builder: Levingston Shipbuilding Co., Orange, TX
- Laid down: 26 October 1944
- Launched: 24 November 1944
- Commissioned: 1 February 1945
- Decommissioned: 1 September 1946
- Renamed: USS Stallion (ATA-193), 16 July 1948
- Reclassified: Auxiliary Fleet Tug ATA-193, 15 May 1944
- Recommissioned: 19 July 1949
- Decommissioned: October 1969
- Stricken: 10 June 1997
- Fate: Sold to the Dominican Republic Navy as Enriquillo (RM-22); Sunk as an artificial reef in 2006

General characteristics
- Class & type: Sotoyomo-class auxiliary fleet tug
- Displacement: 534 t.(lt) 835 t.(fl)
- Length: 143 ft (44 m)
- Beam: 33 ft (10 m)
- Draft: 13 ft (4.0 m)
- Propulsion: diesel-electric engines, single screw
- Speed: 13 knots (24 km/h; 15 mph)
- Complement: 45
- Armament: one single 3 in (76 mm) dual purpose gun mount; two twin 20 mm AA gun mounts

The second USS Stallion was laid down on 26 October 1944 at Orange, Texas, by the Levingston Shipbuilding Co. as ATA-193; launched on 24 November 1944; and commissioned on 1 February 1945.

The tug completed shakedown along the Gulf coast out of Galveston, Texas, between 11 February and 2 March. On the following day, she towed Army barges to New Orleans and, after a five-day stay, got underway for the Panama Canal. ATA-193 arrived in the Canal Zone on 17 March and departed on 3 April. She reached San Diego on 25 April and Pearl Harbor on 17 May. On the 29th, she continued west and stopped at Eniwetok, Saipan, and Guam, before reaching Okinawa on 11 July. The tug served at Okinawa with Service Squadron 10 until 29 July. She headed via Saipan to Pearl Harbor and arrived on 24 August. Six days later, ATA-193 sailed west again, stopped at Saipan and Okinawa, and returned to Pearl Harbor on 24 October.

She remained there until 1 March 1946; then got underway for San Diego where she arrived on the 20th. Eight days later, ATA-193 sailed for Panama. She transited the canal between 14 and 17 June and continued on to Jacksonville, Florida, then to New Orleans and Orange, Tex., arriving on 13 August 1946. She decommissioned there on 1 September 1946. ATA-193 was named Stallion in July 1948 and remained inactive at Orange as a unit of the 16th (Reserve) Fleet until 19 July 1949, when she was recommissioned. She was assigned to the Commander, Hydrographic Survey, to operate in the Persian Gulf. After short visits to Norfolk and New York City, the tug got underway for the Mediterranean on 1 October 1949. Stallion spent 27 of the next 32 months operating in the Mediterranean Sea and the Persian Gulf. In addition to Kuwait, Bahrain, and Aden, she visited Port Said, Suez, and Karachi during her tour in the Middle East. Stallion returned to Norfolk on 29 May 1952.

For the next three years, the tug was administratively assigned to the 5th Naval District but was operationally controlled by the Naval Ordnance Laboratory (NOL), White Oak, Maryland She operated out of Fort Monroe, Virginia, and Port Everglades, Florida, assisting NOL in ordnance evaluation tests. On 7 March 1955, Stallion was reassigned to the 6th Naval District administratively, but remained under the operational control of NOL. She operated primarily out of her new home port, Port Everglades, Fla., in conjunction with the Naval Ordnance Test Facility located nearby. She participated in mine evaluation tests conducted in the Bahama Islands and along the coast of Florida, particularly around Panama City and Fort Lauderdale.

On 22 May 1959, Stallion came under the operational control of the 6th Naval District. Although she continued to be associated with the projects of the Naval Ordnance Test Facility at Fort Lauderdale, her participation came to be more on a single project basis with the tug concentrating more often on duty for the naval district. On 1 July 1967, Stallion's homeport was changed to Charleston, South Carolina, and she spent increasingly greater portions of her time engaged in ocean towing, off-shore salvage, and rescue salvage operations. On 1 October 1968, Stallion was placed in reduced operational status at Charleston.

Stallion was decommissioned at Norfolk, Va., in October 1969 and joined the Atlantic Reserve Fleet. In December 1970, she was transferred to the custody of the Maritime Administration but remained under Navy ownership. She was finally transferred to the Dominican Republic under the Security Assistance Program and renamed Enriquillo (RM-22).

Enriquillo was retired by the Dominican Navy in 2006 and subsequently sunk as an artificial reef.

ATA-193 earned one battle star for World War II service.
