= United States Naval Station Orange =

US Navy Shipyard in Texas

Coordinates: 30.101642°N 93.717567°W

United States Naval Station Orange: Texas Group, Atlantic Reserve Fleet
- Orange, Texas
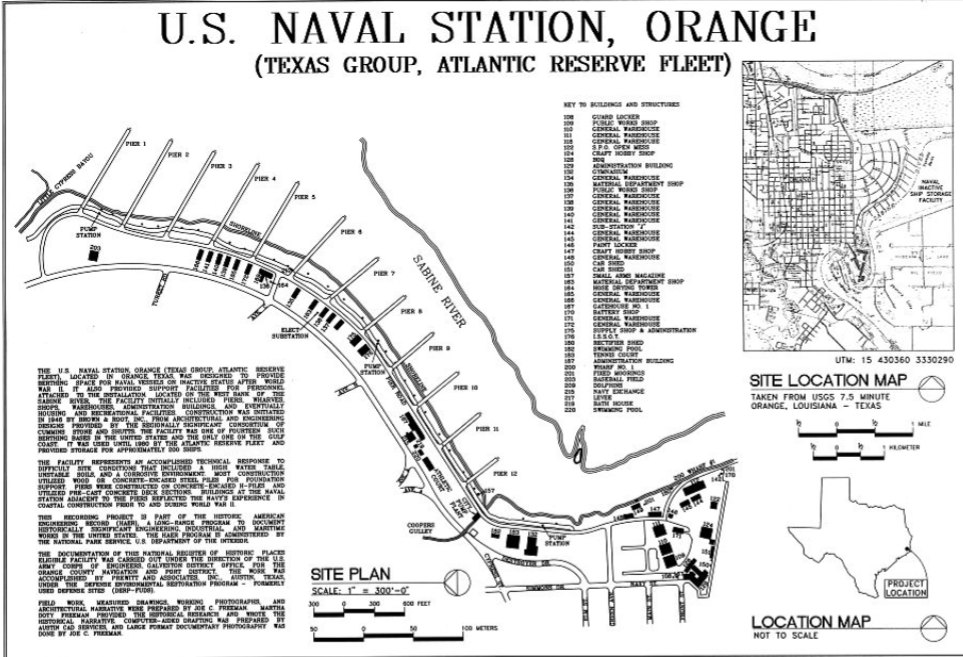
- United States Naval Station Orange map from 1968

Site information
- Type: Naval Station (1940 1945; Reserve Fleet (1945-1975)
- Owner: United States of America
- Controlled by: United States Navy

Site history
- In use: 1940-1975

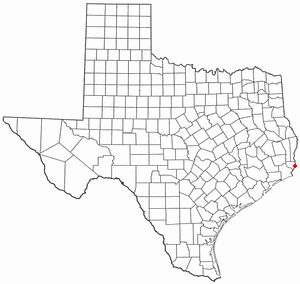
Location in Texas, United States

United States Naval Station Orange, later Texas Group, Atlantic Reserve Fleet and US Naval Reserve Orange was a major United States Navy shipyard in Orange, Texas on the Sabine River. The shipyard opened on August 24, 1940, to manage the construction of 24 landing craft. To support the shipyards the navy built new naval offices, barracks and civilian housing. The Navy built twelve piers in the Sabine River at the Base. U.S. Naval Station Orange also worked with the civilian shipyards in Texas during World War II. Major civilian shipyards were: Consolidated Steel Corporation, Levingston Shipbuilding Company, and Weaver Shipyards. At the end of the war in November 1945 the shipyard was closed and the base was turned into the Texas Group, Atlantic Reserve Fleet with 250 ships.

== Atlantic Reserve Fleet, Orange ==
The freshwater of the Sabine River was good place for a Reserve Fleet. The Atlantic Reserve Fleet, Orange was part of the United States Navy reserve fleets. For the Korean War, 40 ships were removed from the Reserve fleet and restored at the shipyard. The Texas Group was disestablished on October 1, 1966. The site became a Naval Inactive Ship Maintenance Facility (ISMF) with only 197 ships stored on site and most of the work done by civilian contractors. Naval Inactive Ship Maintenance Facility closed on December 28, 1975. It took five years to remove all ships at the yard. All that remains is 18 1/2 acres for the U.S. Navy and Marine Corps Reserve Training Center. The other land was sold to the American Bridge, U.S Steel, Lamar State College, Orange and Orange County Navigation and Port District.

== Historical markers ==
A historical markers are at the site to remember the former large Navy Yard.

- The United States Naval Station Orange marker reads:

Orange, Texas has a long association with the U.S.Navy. Its shipyards build 39 destroyers, 93 destroyer escorts, 106 landing craft, and numerous other vessels in World War II. Orange was home for 250 "Mothball" ships of the Atlantic Reserve Fleet after WWII. Forty of these ships served in the Korean War. During 1974, the Navy began phasing out the fleet berthing operation. By the latter part of that decade, all of the ships were gone. In 1975, Naval Reserve Centers located in Beaumont and Lake Charles were disestablished and the selected reservists were assigned to a consolidated site in Orange. The 18.5 acres that remain in the Navy's hands are the site of the present U.S. Navy Reserve Center, Orange, Texas.

Next to United States Naval Station Orange was Bethlehem Sabine Shipyard.

- The Riverside Addition Housing Project marker reads:

The second World War catapulted Orange into a period of unparalleled industrial growth. In 1940, as the nation prepared for possible entry into the war, the U.S. Navy Office of Shipbuilding placed orders with three shipyards: Levingston Shipbuilding Company, Consolidated Western Steel Corporation and Weaver Shipyards. Production continued to grow after the U.S. entered the war in 1941. Countless jobs had been lost during the Great Depression, and the potential for steady work brought thousands to Orange. The influx of workers increased the city’s population from 7,400 in 1940 to more than 60,000 by the end of the war. To meet the resulting critical housing shortage, the federal government started the Riverside Addition Housing Project in 1942. Located along the Sabine River, Riverside Addition was within walking distance of the shipyards, thereby complying with fuel and tire rationing demands and maximizing wartime production. The fan-shaped site soon included thousands of “demountable” (prefabricated) duplexes, considered to be temporary. Expanded with an addition in 1943, the vast Riverside housing area had three elementary schools and also spawned local businesses. At the time, Riverside Addition was the largest federal housing project ever undertaken. After the war, the government sold, moved or demolished many of the units. The city of Orange never took control of the development due to concerns over inadequate infrastructure. Removal of the last houses took place in the 1980s, and today there are few physical reminders of the project that proved vital to the home front mission during World War II.

- The Naval Inactive Ship Maintenance Facility marker reads:

At the termination of World War II, the United States had the largest naval force of any country in history. Prudent military leaders decided against scrapping surplus vessels, in favor of preserving them so they could be activiated quickly in case of emergency. In August of 1945, the Department of the Navy announced that Orange would be one of the locations for the storage of reserved vessels. The abundant fresh water supply of the Sabine River made Orange an ideal location for such a facility, because of the necessity to minimize marine growth and corrosion. Also, the existing shipyard adjancent to the site could be used for repair and maintenance of the "mothballed" fleet. However, it was still necessary to construct a berthing area for the inactive ships, and a permit for the construction of twelve piers was obtained. The facility was named the U.S. Naval Station, Orange, Texas, in November of 1945. The first vessel to report for inactivation was the USS Matagorda, which arrived on November 5. When the Korean War began in 1950, the facility reactivated over thirty ships, after which many were returned for storage. The facility United States Naval Inactive Ship Maintenance Facility at Orange was one of fifty-two to be chosen in 1961 by the Department of Defense to be closed or phased down. The facility remained operable, but the military presence was reduced to twenty-five officers and enlisted men, and large numbers of civilians were hired to continue operations. On December 28, 1975, the Naval Inactive Ship Maintenance Facility at Orange was closed. By 1980 all remaining vessels were transferred to other locations, sold to foreign nations or sold for scrap.

== See also ==
- Wooden boats of World War II
