= USS Keosanqua (ATA-198) =

Tugboat of the United States Navy

History

United States
- Name: USS Keosanqua
- Ordered: as Rescue Ocean Tug, ATR-125
- Builder: Levingston Shipbuilding Co., Orange, Texas
- Launched: 17 January 1945
- Commissioned: 19 March 1945
- Decommissioned: 25 May 1956
- Renamed: USS Keosanqua (ATA-198), 16 July 1948
- Reclassified: ATA-198, Auxiliary Fleet Tug, 15 May 1944
- Stricken: 1 May 1961
- Honours and awards: 2 battle stars (South Korea)
- Fate: Transferred to South Korea, 1 February 1962

South Korea
- Name: ROKS Yong Mun (ATA-2)
- Acquired: 1 February 1962
- Fate: Unknown

General characteristics
- Class & type: Maricopa-class auxiliary fleet tug
- Displacement: 534 long tons (543 t)
- Length: 143 ft (44 m)
- Beam: 33 ft (10 m)
- Draft: 13 ft (4 m)
- Propulsion: Diesel-electric engines, single screw
- Speed: 13 knots (24 km/h; 15 mph)
- Complement: 5 officers, 42 enlisted
- Armament: 1 × single 3"/50 caliber gun mount; 2 × single 20 mm AA gun mounts

USS Keosanqua (ATA-198) was a Maricopa-class auxiliary fleet tug of the United States Navy. The ship was authorized as Rescue Ocean Tug ATR-125, and redesignated Auxiliary Fleet Tug USS ATA-198 on 15 May 1944. The ship was laid down at Levingston Shipbuilding Co., Orange, Texas, launched on 17 January 1945, and commissioned on 19 March 1945. She was named Keosanqua (ATA-198) on 16 July 1948.

== Pacific Theatre operations ==
Departing Galveston, Texas, 18 April, ATA-198 steamed via the Panama Canal and San Francisco, California, for duty in the Pacific. She reached Pearl Harbor 1 June, then continued 7 June via Eniwetok and Ulithi towing the cargo ship Pegasus (IX-222) to the Philippines. Arriving Leyte Gulf on 18 July, she departed the 21st and reached Pearl Harbor via Kwajalein on 7 August. From 9 August to 31 October she made two towing runs to San Francisco, and then resumed harbor and barge towing duty out of Pearl Harbor. For more than three years she made periodic towing runs to Wake Island; to various islands in the Hawaiian chain, including Maui and Midway Island; and to the U.S. West Coast.

== Korean War operations ==
Renamed Keosanqua 16 July 1948, she departed Pearl Harbor on 7 December for Long Beach, California, where she arrived 22 December. Proceeding to San Diego, California, 3 January 1949, she commenced target towing duty with the Fleet ASW Training Center and provided harbor and coastal towing services between San Diego and Long Beach. On 19 June 1951, while the United States fought to protect South Korea from Communist aggression, she departed San Diego for a 10-month deployment in the western Pacific Ocean.

Operating primarily out of Sasebo, Japan, Keosanqua provided tug service along the coast of Korea from Makpo to Inchon. Departing Sasebo on 25 March, she steamed via Pearl Harbor to San Diego, arriving 19 April.

On two subsequent deployments (26 January-30 September 1953 and 7 February-2 October 1955) Keosanqua served with the United States Seventh Fleet in the Far East, providing harbor tug and target towing services out of Sasebo and Yokosuka, Japan.

== Decommissioning ==
After returning from the western Pacific in 1955, she continued operations out of San Diego, California, until 25 May 1956 when she decommissioned and entered the Pacific Reserve Fleet. Her name was struck from the Navy List on 1 May 1961. She was transferred to the Republic of Korea and commissioned as ROKS Yong Mun (ATA-2) on 1 February 1962.

== Awards ==
Keosanqua received two battle stars for Korean War service. The first for her actions in the United Nations Summer-Fall Offensive in November 1951, and the second for the Second Korean Winter campaign in January – March 1952.
