= USS Navajo (ATA-211) =

Tugboat of the United States Navy

History

United States
- Name: USS Navajo
- Ordered: as Rescue Ocean Tug ATR-138, redesignated Auxiliary Fleet Tug ATA-211, 13 April 1944
- Builder: Gulfport Boiler and Welding Works, Port Arthur, Texas
- Laid down: 20 January 1945
- Launched: 3 March 1945
- Commissioned: 3 May 1945
- Decommissioned: 10 April 1962
- Renamed: Navajo (ATA-211), 15 July 1948
- Stricken: 1 May 1962
- Identification: IMO number: 6607630; MMSI number: 334464000; Callsign: HQWV8
- Fate: Sold in 1963; Active as commercial vessel

General characteristics
- Class & type: Sotoyomo-class auxiliary fleet tug
- Displacement: 534 long tons (543 t) light; 835 long tons (848 t) full
- Length: 143 ft (44 m)
- Beam: 33 ft (10 m)
- Draft: 13 ft (4.0 m)
- Propulsion: Diesel-electric engines, single screw
- Speed: 13 knots (24 km/h; 15 mph)
- Complement: 45
- Armament: 1 × single 3"/50 caliber gun; 2 × single 20 mm AA gun mounts

USS Navajo (ATR-138/ATA-211) was an auxiliary ocean tug in the United States Navy.

Originally designated ATR–138, she was redesignated ATA–211 on 13 April 1944 and laid down on 20 January 1945 by Gulfport Boiler & Welding Works, Port Arthur, Texas. Launched on 3 March 1945, and commissioned at Port Arthur on 3 May 1945.

== Pacific Theatre operations ==
Following fitting out and shakedown off Galveston, ATA–211 reported to the Naval Supply Depot, Gulfport, Mississippi, on 5 June, and thence steamed via the Panama Canal to San Diego, where she was to join ServRon 2, Pacific.

ATA–211 towed AFL–23 and harbor tug YT–742 to Pearl Harbor in July and remained there to perform ready tug duty and relief towing services with the Waipie Salvage Dock, in the ocean operations off Pearl Harbor. In October, she cleared Pearl Harbor with fuel oil barge YO–12 and garbage lighter YG–28 in tow, and headed for Yokosuka, Japan, where she arrived the 24th. Departing Yokosuka in early November, she returned Pearl Harbor and, joined by fleet ocean tug USS Nipmuc and auxiliary floating dry dock USS Waterford, steamed to San Diego. She departed this base on 27 December to serve as retriever tug for ATF–157.

== East Coast operations ==
After escorting ATF–157 through the Panama Canal, ATA–211 cleared Coco Solo on 5 February 1946 and touched at Key West before arriving at the U.S. Naval Station, Algiers, Louisiana, 11 February. She remained in the 8th Naval District for most of the remainder of her Naval career, providing towing service to ports such as Mobile, Galveston, Pensacola, and Charleston, and assisting in off-shore salvage operations.

== Decommissioning ==
ATA–211 was named Navajo on 15 July 1948. She continued operations off the Gulf states and Bermuda into 1962. Decommissioning on 10 April 1962, she was stricken from the Navy List on 1 May 1962 and was subsequently sold to Twenty Grand Marine Service, Inc., Morgan City, Louisiana, in 1963.

As of 2016, ATA-211 remained in commercial service, operating in Honduras under the name Hyperion.
