= USS Sotoyomo (ATA-121) =

Tugboat of the United States Navy

History

United States
- Name: USS Sotoyomo
- Builder: Levingston Shipbuilding Co., Orange, Texas
- Laid down: 7 September 1942
- Launched: 19 October 1942
- Commissioned: 29 May 1943, as USS ATR-43
- Decommissioned: 9 April 1946
- Recommissioned: 6 June 1951
- Decommissioned: 1 July 1955
- Renamed: USS ATA-121, 15 May 1944; USS Sotoyomo (ATA-121), 16 July 1948
- Stricken: 1 September 1961
- Fate: Sold to the Republic of Mexico Navy, June 1963

Mexico
- Name: ARM Sotoyomo
- Acquired: June 1963
- Fate: Unknown

General characteristics
- Class & type: Sotoyomo-class tugboat
- Displacement: 534 long tons (543 t) light; 835 long tons (848 t) full
- Length: 143 ft (44 m)
- Beam: 33 ft (10 m)
- Draft: 13 ft (4.0 m)
- Propulsion: Diesel-electric engines, single screw
- Speed: 13 knots (24 km/h; 15 mph)
- Complement: 45
- Armament: 1 × 3"/50 caliber gun

USS Sotoyomo (ATR-43/ATA-121) was a rescue tug of the United States Navy that served during World War II and the early 1950s, and was sold to Mexico in 1963.

The ship was laid down on 7 September 1942 at Orange, Texas, by the Levingston Shipbuilding Co., launched on 19 October 1942, and commissioned on 29 May 1943 as USS ATR-43.

== Service history ==
=== 1943–1946 ===
In June 1943, ATR-43 sailed from Orange; proceeded via New Orleans and Key West to Hampton Roads; and arrived at Norfolk, Virginia on the 29th. On 21 July, after shakedown exercises and eight days in drydock at the Norfolk Navy Yard, ATR-43 headed back to Key West. For the next 10 months, she operated in the Caribbean Sea and the south Atlantic. The tug visited Trinidad; Bermuda; and Recife and Belem, Brazil. She was redesignated ATA-121 on 15 May 1944. She departed Bermuda on 8 May 1945; transited the Panama Canal; and reached San Diego, California, on 1 June. On the 7th, she sailed, via Puget Sound and Pearl Harbor for the western Pacific.

On Independence Day 1945, she sailed for Eniwetok Atoll with the barracks craft APL-2, floating workshop YR-61, and harbor tug YTL-550 in tow. On the 22nd, she entered Eniwetok Lagoon; and, the next day, she departed to tow YTL-550 to Kwajalein. She arrived at Kwajalein on 25 July and sailed for Pearl Harbor the following day. She made Pearl on 2 August and remained there until after Japan surrendered.

The ship performed towing missions between Hawaii, the Marshall Islands, and the Marianas through most of the autumn. Early in December, she departed Pearl Harbor and arrived at San Diego on the 17th. ATA-121 was decommissioned at Astoria, Oregon, on 9 April 1946.

=== 1951–1968 ===
On 6 June 1951, she was recommissioned as Sotoyomo (ATA-121). Between 15 June 1951 and 25 June 1952, she operated in and around San Diego. She next made a voyage to Sasebo, Japan, via Pearl Harbor and Midway, and returned to San Diego on 15 March 1953. She again departed San Diego on 23 April, reached Pearl Harbor on 3 May, and entered the naval shipyard there for overhaul. On 8 July, she exited Pearl Harbor to return to the California coast and arrived at San Diego on the 18th. She remained there until 2 February 1954, when she got underway for Sasebo, Japan, via Pearl Harbor and Kwajalein. Returning via Midway and Pearl Harbor, Sotoyomo arrived in San Diego on 22 September.

=== Decommissioning and sale ===
In the spring of 1955, the ship returned to Astoria where she was decommissioned on 1 July. She was berthed in the Columbia River until her name was struck from the Navy List on 1 September 1961. In June 1963, the ship was sold to the government of Mexico.
