= Levingston Shipbuilding Company =

Shipyard in Texas, US

Coordinates: 30.08938°N 93.72857°W

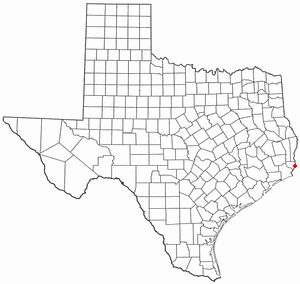
Location in Texas, United States

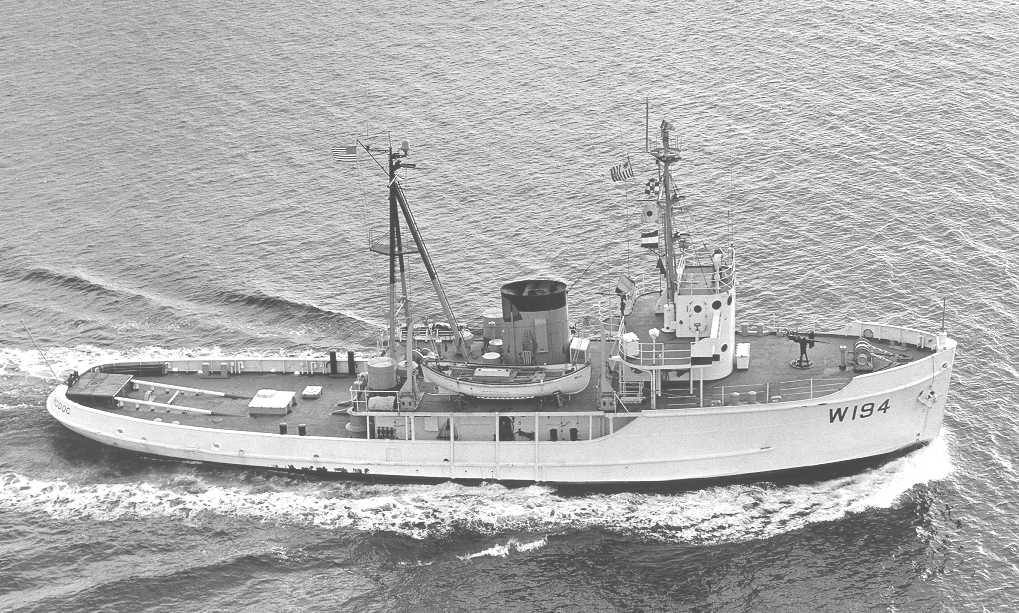
USCGC Modoc (WMEC-194), ex-Bagaduce, built at Levingston Shipbuilding in 1944

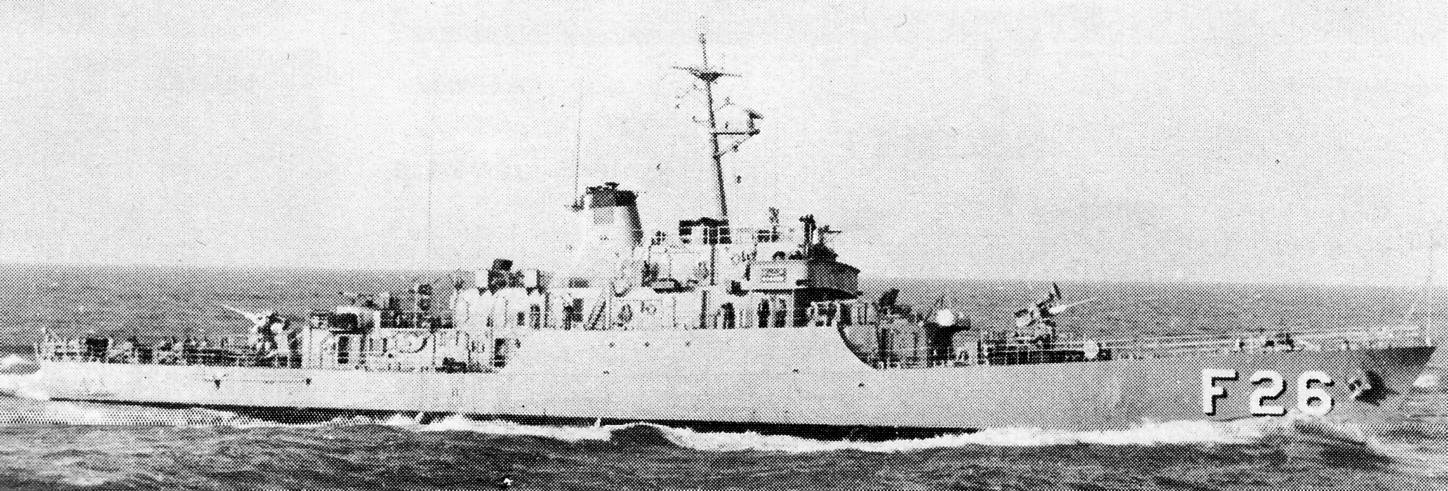
IRIS Naghdi (82), built at Levingston Shipbuilding in 1963

Levingston Shipbuilding Company was a shipbuilding company at Orange, Texas on the Sabine River founded by George Levingston. During World War II Levingston Shipbuilding Company built ships for the United States Naval Station Orange also on the Sabine River. George Levingston also purchased major shares of Joseph Weaver and Son Shipyard, also on the Sabine River. The company was started by Samuel H. Levingston in 1859.

== Ships ==
First ship completed was in 1925, last ship was in 1982, as the company was sold to the company's CEO, Ed Paden. For World War II Levingston built Tank Barges a Type B ship and Tugboats a Type V ship.

Notable ships:

- Bayandor-class corvette
  - Bayandor (1963)
  - Naghdi (1963)
  - Milanian (1968)
  - Kahnamoie (1968)
- 30 of 49 Sotoyomo-class tugboats
  - Sotoyomo (ATA-121) ... ATA-125
  - Wateree (ATA-174) ... Keosanqua (ATA-198)
- RV Pacific Escort I
- USS Sea Otter II (IX-53) - Tank Barge
- Staten Island Ferry Kennedy class

== Historical marker ==
At the site of Levingston Shipbuilding Company is a historical marker that reads:

In 1859, three brothers, Samuel, David and John Levingston, arrived in Orange from Ireland and purchased an existing shipyard, where they built wooden ships for more than thirty years. The son of Samuel Levingston, "Captain" George Levingston, established his own shipbuilding business in 1919-1920. In 1930, Levingston purchased five acres at Front and Mill Streets in Orange, enlarging his operation, and Levingston Shipbuilding Company operated from this location for the remainder of its existence. Incorporation in 1933 sustained the company during the slow economic times of the 1930s. Edward T. Malloy was hired in 1939 as a general manager, and stayed with the company for thirty-seven years, becoming president of the company when he bought the controlling interest in 1945.

World War II brought a vast influx of business--the company had begun construction of military vessels before the United States entered the war, and continued to be a major supplier for the Army and Navy during the duration. Levingston Shipbuilding delivered its first vessel for the war effort, a 530-ton steel tugboat named Tuscarora on December 13, 1941. Between 1941 and 1945, Levinston built and delivered a total of 160 vessels for the U.S. Navy and U.S. Army including tugs, tankers, barges and ocean going rescue tugs. After World War II, Levingston Shipbuilding changed with the economic times and became a worldwide leader in the design, engineering and construction of off-shore drilling rigs, jack-up platforms, and self-propelled drilling ships. Levingston Shipbuilding was the only U.S. builder of all five types of offshore drilling rigs until it ceased operations in 1985.

Among the drilling ships built in the mid-seventies was the Glomar Java Sea built for Global Marine. Jack up rigs for Diamond 'M' included the Diamond 'M' Gem. Ashland Chemical Company purchased the yard thereafter and built drilling rigs for their own operations.
