= James Griffiths & Sons, Inc. =

Former Shipping Company

- Type: Private
- Industry: Shipping
- Founded: 1885 in Seattle, Washington, United States
- Key people: Captain James Griffiths; Stanley Griffiths; Bert Griffiths

James Griffiths & Sons, Inc., was a shipping and shipbuilding company that operated from 1885 to at least 1948 in the U.S. state of Washington.

== History ==
The company was founded in Seattle, Washington, by James Griffiths (1861–1943), a native of Newport, Wales, where he was a captain of a ship. He started as an agent for NYK Line of Japan. Griffiths ran the company with his sons Stanley and Bert.

In 1916, James Griffiths purchased Winslow Marine Railway and Shipbuilding Company, a Puget Sound shipyard on Bainbridge Island.

In 1936, Griffiths & Sons and the Olympic Steamship Company formed the Consolidated Olympic Company. The new venture leased vessels to provide service on the Olympic-Griffiths Line, a shipping route between Long Beach, California, and Seattle and Tacoma, Washington. Common freight was lumber and newsprint.

During World War II, the Winslow shipyard built Auk-class minesweepers and Admirable-class minesweepers for the U.S. Navy. The company also operated Liberty ships and Victory ships for the United States Shipping Board and charter shipping with the Maritime Commission and War Shipping Administration. The company provided the crews, while Navy Armed Guards manned the deck guns and radio.

In 1947, Consolidated Olympic acquired the SS Olympic Pioneer, a 7,216-ton former Liberty ship. In 1948, Griffiths the sold the shipyard.

== Ships ==
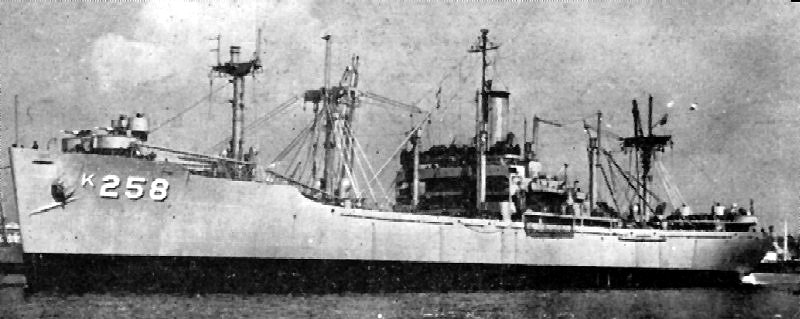
A Victory ship of World War II

Liberty ship of World War II

=== Owned ===
- Olympic Pioneer. Built in 1944 as Liberty ship James A. Drain, acquired in 1947, sold in 1962.
- Griffson. Cargo, 2,259 tons built in 1916, built by Winslow Marine Railway & Shipbuilding Company
- Anyox, Cargo, 1,287 tons built in 1917, built by Winslow Marine Railway & Shipbuilding Company
- Sueja III, Yacht, 179 tons, built in 1926, built by Winslow Marine Railway & Shipbuilding Company, renamed Salvage Queen in 1941, renamed Sheng-Li in 1946, burned on the Whangpoo River in 1948

=== Operated ===
==== Liberty ships ====
- Edmond Mallett
- Edward A. MacDowell
- Nicholas J. Sinnott
- Rufus W. Peckham
- William Cullen Bryant

==== Victory ships ====
- Douglas Victory

== Ships built ==
Built at the Winslow shipyard from 1919 to 1947:

Ship Name	Built for	Type	Tons	Yeat Built	Notes
Reta	Felix R. Shoer	Fishing	8	1919	
Griffson	Norton Clapp	Schooner	2,259	1920	
Sueja III	Capt. James Griffiths	Yacht	179	1926	Renamed Mariner III
Quillayute	Sound Ferry Line	Ferry	728	1927	
Chahunta	Lincoln County Logging	Tug	101	1928	
Brown Bear	US F&W Service	Survey Vessel		1934	To USN 1942 Renamed YP 197, returned 1946
Gary Foss	Foss Launch & Tug	Tug	63	1935	
A J No. 3	Bolivar S Eqpmt.	Freight Barge	271	1935	
A J No. 4	Bolivar S Eqpmt.	Freight Barge	271	1935	
A J No. 5	Bolivar S Eqpmt.	Freight Barge	271	1935	
E. B. Schley	Howe Sound Mining Co.	Tug	46	1937	
	Howe Sound Mining Co.	Dry Bulk Barge		1937	
	Howe Sound Mining Co.	Dry Bulk Barge		1937	
	Howe Sound Mining Co.	Dry Bulk Barge		1937	
Atlas	Ritchie Tptn.	Freight Barge	118	1939	
L McN & L IX No. 11	Bern O. Bliss	Freight Barge	117	1939	
P. A. F. No. 6	Pacific Am. Fisheries	Freight Barge	100	1939	
	Puget Sound NSY	Caisson		1939	
USS Pursuit (AM 108)	US Navy	Minesweeper	1250d	30-Apr-43	Renamed AGS 17 1952, scrapped 1964
USS Requisite (AM-109)	US Navy	Minesweeper	1250d	7-Jun-43	Renamed AGS 18 1952, scrapped 1964
USS Revenge (AM 110)	US Navy	Minesweeper	1250d	27-Jul-43	Scrapped 1967
USS Sage (AM 111)	US Navy	Minesweeper	1250d	23-Aug-43	To Mexico 1973 Renamed Hermenegildo Galeana, Renamed Matamoros (PO 117)
USS Salute (AM 294)	US Navy	Minesweeper	850d	4-Dec-43	Mined off Labuan and lost 1945
USS Saunter (AM 295)	US Navy	Minesweeper	850d	22-Jan-44	Scrapped 1946
USS Scout (AM 296)	US Navy	Minesweeper	850d	3-Mar-44	To Mexico 1963 Renamed DM 09, scrapped
USS Scrimmage (AM 297)	US Navy	Minesweeper	850d	4-Apr-44	Sold 1962, later cable ship Giant II, research vessel Mahi, reefed in Hawaii 1982
USS Scuffle (AM 298)	US Navy	Minesweeper	850d	2-May-44	To Mexico 1963 Renamed General Felipe Xicotencatl (C 53), scrapped
USS Sentry (AM 299)	US Navy	Minesweeper	850d	30-May-44	To Vietnam 1962 Renamed Ky Hoa (HQ 09), scrapped
USS Serene (AM-300)	US Navy	Minesweeper	850d	24-Jun-44	To Vietnam 1963 Renamed Nhut Tao (HQ 10), scrapped
USS Shelter (AM 301)	US Navy	Minesweeper	850d	9-Jul-44	To Vietnam 1963 Renamed Chi Linh (HQ 11), scrapped
USS Garland (AM-238)	US Navy	Minesweeper	850d	26-Aug-44	Scrapped 1960
USS Gayety (AM-239)	US Navy	Minesweeper	850d	23-Sep-44	To Vietnam 1962 Renamed Chi Lang II (HQ 08), to the Philippines 1975 Renamed Magat Salamat (PS 20)
USS Hazard (AM-240)	US Navy	Minesweeper	850d	31-Oct-44	Sold 1968, to Omaha NE 1971 as museum
USS Hilarity (AM-241)	US Navy	Minesweeper	850d	27-Nov-44	To Mexico 1962 Renamed D 2, scrapped
USS Inaugural (AM-242)	US Navy	Minesweeper	850d	30-Dec-44	To St. Louis MO 1968 as museum, swept from moorings and sank 1993
YTL 571	US Navy	Yard Tug	70d	1945	Sold 1974
YTL 572	US Navy	Yard Tug	70d	1945	To the Philippines 1948
YTL 573	US Navy	Yard Tug	70d	1945	To France 1951
YTL 574	US Navy	Yard Tug	70d	1945	Sold
Oil Pilot	Tugs, Inc.	Tug	55	1945	
Rustler	Long Beach Tugboat Co.	Tug	51	1945	

== See also ==
- World War II United States Merchant Navy
