= USS Revenge (AM-110) =

Minesweeper of the United States Navy

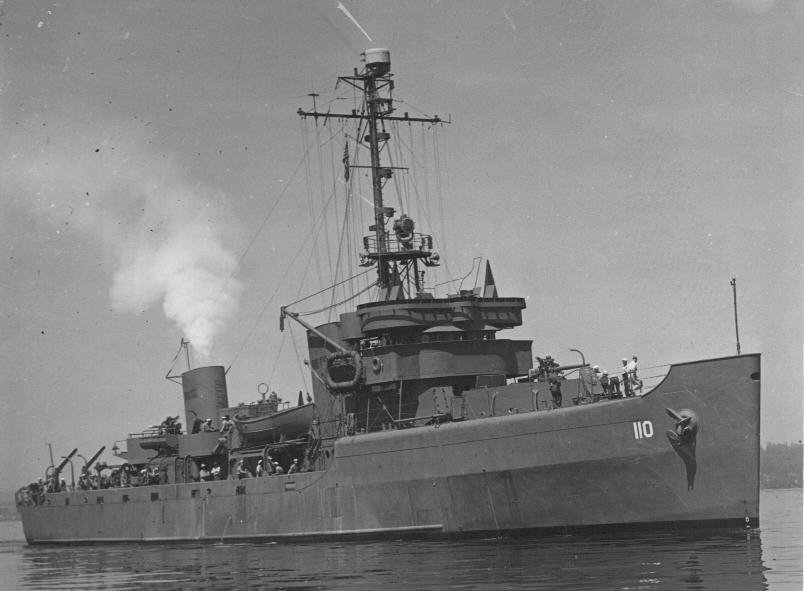
- USS Revenge (AM-110)

History

United States
- Name: USS Revenge
- Builder: Winslow Marine Railway and Shipbuilding Company, Seattle, Washington
- Laid down: 19 June 1942
- Launched: 7 November 1942
- Commissioned: 21 July 1943
- Decommissioned: 18 March 1947
- Recommissioned: 14 February 1951
- Decommissioned: 9 March 1955
- Reclassified: MSF-110, 7 March 1955
- Stricken: 1 November 1956
- Honours and awards: 6 battle stars (World War II)
- Fate: Sold for scrapping, May 1967

General characteristics
- Class & type: Auk-class minesweeper
- Displacement: 890 long tons (904 t)
- Length: 221 ft 3 in (67.44 m)
- Beam: 32 ft (9.8 m)
- Draft: 10 ft 9 in (3.28 m)
- Speed: 18 knots (33 km/h; 21 mph)
- Complement: 100 officers and enlisted
- Armament: 1 × 3"/50 caliber gun; 2 × 40 mm guns; 2 × 20 mm guns

USS Revenge (AM-110) was a World War II-era Auk-class minesweeper in the service of the United States Navy. It was the sixth United States vessel named Revenge.

Revenge was laid down as Right on 19 June 1942 by Winslow Marine Railway and Shipbuilding Company, Seattle, Washington; launched on 7 November 1942; renamed Revenge 15 May 1943; and commissioned on 21 July 1943.

== Service history ==
=== Marshall and Gilbert Islands campaign ===
After outfitting at Puget Sound Navy Yard, Revenge underwent shakedown out of San Pedro and San Diego, California. She departed on 13 October 1943 for further training in the Hawaiian Islands, and on 10 November she set course for Makin Island, the Gilberts, arriving two days later. After two days of minesweeping, she commenced anti-submarine patrol off Makin and Tarawa.

Following Christmas and training at Pearl Harbor, Revenge sailed for Kwajalein Atoll and commenced minesweeping operations on 13 January 1944. For a brief period following the invasion, she alternated between antisubmarine patrol and harbor entrance control. From the end of February through mid-May, she was utilized as an escort vessel, travelling between the Marshalls, the Gilberts and the Hawaiian Islands. She then returned to the west coast.

=== Philippines campaign ===
Upon completion of a short availability at Mare Island Navy Yard, Revenge again commenced escort duty out of Pearl Harbor. September brought the resumption of training exercises, this time at Hilo, after which she sailed for Manus, the Admiralties. On 11 October she headed for the Philippines and the invasion of Leyte.

The weather was exceedingly rough and, the night before the initial sweep, 20 foot seas were running. In spite of the weather, Mine Division 13 (of which Revenge was a unit) entered Leyte Gulf at daybreak with gear streamed. No navigational plots could be kept, nor could the ships remain on stations as the weather had reached typhoon intensity. No enemy action was observed, but activities were made hazardous by the abundance of floating mines and the difficulties involved in maneuvering the craft. Weather abated somewhat the next day and sweeping operations were earned out in a more normal fashion. After six days Revenge was credited with the destruction of nearly 70 mines.

Once the beachhead was secured and the anchorage made safe, the division continued clearance sweeps around Homonhon and Samar. On 27 November, Pursuit (AM-108) and Revenge made an exploratory sweep on the western side of Leyte.

Revenge was scheduled to participate in the invasion of Luzon early in January 1945, but, because of a damaged propeller shaft, she was ordered to Pearl Harbor for repairs. In February she was again assigned convoy duty, this time out of Ulithi, Western Carolines. Then, on 19 March she got underway with some 70 other minecraft for the invasion of Okinawa.

=== Okinawa invasion ===
No early difficulties were encountered off Okinawa by Revenge. She operated just off the invasion beaches, where strong tides caused some anxiety and these very tides caused Skylark (AM-63) to drift into unswept waters 28 March, where she struck a mine and sank. In the attendant rescue operations, Revenge cleared a path to one side of Skylark while Sage (AM-111) cleared a path to the other. Rescue work was so efficient that only five men died in the stricken minesweeper, and they were killed in the initial explosion.

For 76 days Revenge remained on patrol off Okinawa. In March her gunners detected and sank a Japanese suicide boat as it attempted to run in under cover of darkness. Late in June relief was assigned and Revenge called at Guam for two weeks of availability.

=== Post-war operations ===
In July Revenge returned to Okinawa, but soon departed with a small minesweeping group for the East China Sea. Then, on 27 August, Revenge went alongside Ellyson (DMS-19) to take aboard a Japanese pilot for the sweep of Tokyo Bay. The next morning Revenge led the group into Tokyo Bay. (The helmsman was Charles Quick ).There was a fairly wide channel, and safe anchorages were quickly charted for the rest of the fleet. The minesweepers then shifted operations to the coastline. After a month of such operations and some additional time in Tokyo Bay, the minesweepers were ordered to Sasebo.

Operations out of Sasebo took Revenge and her sisters into the East China Sea and the Straits of Formosa. She spent Christmas of 1945 in Shanghai, and in January 1946 returned Sasebo. In mid-January she sailed for San Pedro, California, and from there through the Panama Canal for Charleston, South Carolina, for inactivation overhaul. Following inactivation on 18 March 1947 she was assigned to the Texas Group, Atlantic Reserve Fleet, Orange, Texas.

=== Second commission, 1951–1955 ===
Recommissioned on 14 February 1951 Revenge provided training services along the east coast as well as in the Caribbean Sea and the Gulf of Mexico. Reclassified MSF-110 on 7 March 1955, she decommissioned two days later and was assigned to the Florida Group, Atlantic Reserve Fleet, at Green Cove Springs, Florida.

== Decommissioning and sale ==
In 1961 Revenge was transferred to the Inactive Ship Maintenance Facility, Orange, Texas, where she remained until struck from the Navy list on 1 November 1966. She was sold for scrap in May 1967.

Revenge earned six battle stars during World War II.
