= USS Hilarity =

Minesweeper of the United States Navy

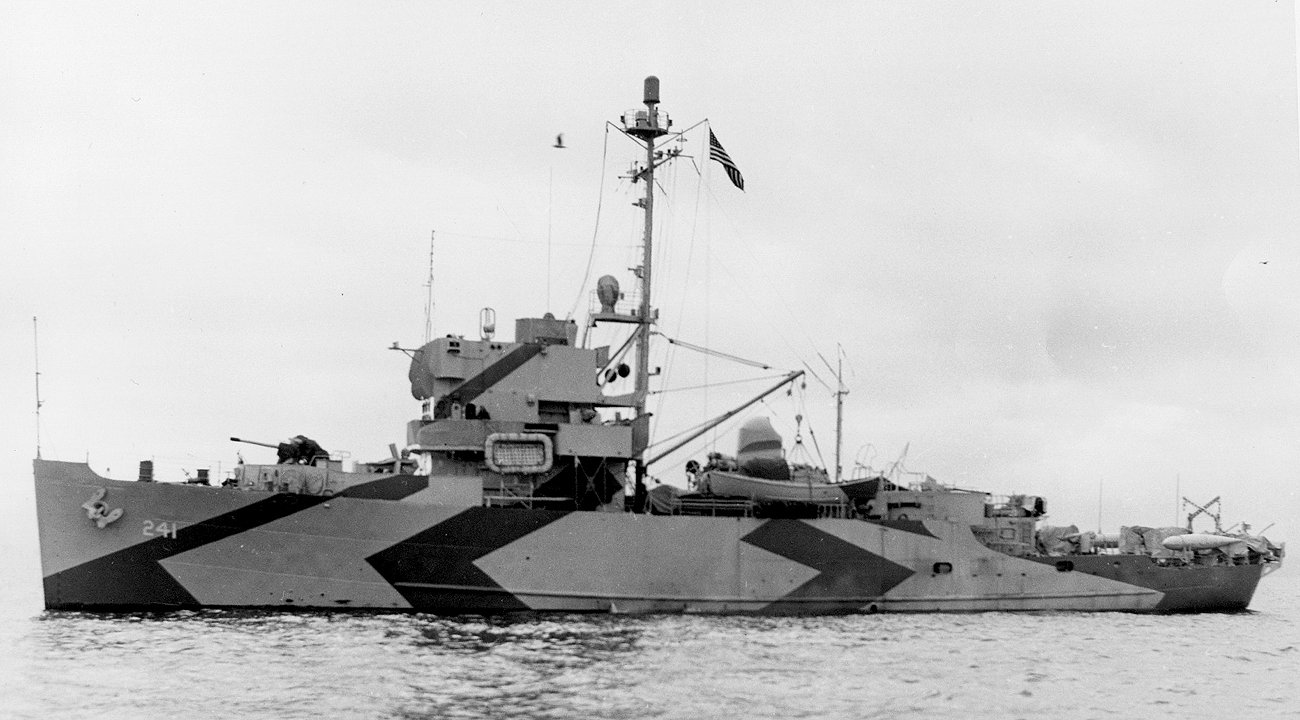
- Hilarity in Puget Sound, Washington probably in December 1944

History

United States
- Name: USS Hilarity (AM-241)
- Builder: Winslow Marine Railway & Shipbuilding Company, Seattle
- Laid down: 20 March 1944
- Launched: 30 July 1944
- Sponsored by: Mrs. L. H. Hirschy
- Commissioned: 27 November 1944
- Decommissioned: 26 August 1946
- Reclassified: MSF-241, 7 February 1955
- Fate: Sold to Mexican Navy, 30 August 1962
- Stricken: 2 October 1962

History

Mexico
- Name: ARM DM-02
- Acquired: 30 August 1962
- Stricken: 1986
- Fate: Scrapped, 1 August 1988

General characteristics
- Class & type: Admirable-class minesweeper
- Displacement: 650 long tons (660 t)
- Length: 184 ft 6 in (56.24 m)
- Beam: 33 ft (10 m)
- Draft: 9 ft 9 in (2.97 m)
- Propulsion: 2 × ALCO 539 diesel engines, 1,710 shp (1,280 kW); Farrel-Birmingham single reduction gear; 2 shafts
- Speed: 15 knots (28 km/h)
- Complement: 104
- Armament: 1 × 3"/50 caliber (76 mm) DP gun; 2 × twin Bofors 40 mm guns; 1 × Hedgehog anti-submarine mortar; 2 × Depth charge tracks

Service record
- Part of: U.S. Pacific Fleet (1944–1946); Atlantic Reserve Fleet (1946–1962); Mexican Navy (1962–1986)
- Operations: Battle of Okinawa
- Awards: 2 Battle stars

USS Hilarity (AM-241) was an Admirable-class minesweeper built for the United States Navy during World War II. She was awarded two battle stars for service in the Pacific during World War II. She was decommissioned in 1946 and placed in the Atlantic Reserve Fleet. While she remained in reserve, Hilarity was reclassified as MSF-241 in February 1955 but never reactivated. In October 1962, she was sold to the Mexican Navy and renamed ARM DM-02. She was stricken in 1986 and scrapped in August 1988.

== U.S. Navy career ==
Hilarity was launched 30 July 1944 by Winslow Marine Railway & Shipbuilding Co., Inc., Winslow, Washington; sponsored by Mrs. L. H. Hirschy; and commissioned 27 November 1944. Following her shakedown training off California, Hilarity took part in exhaustive minesweeping and antisubmarine exercises to ready herself for participation in the Pacific War. She sailed 10 February 1945 from San Pedro, California, and, after her arrival at Pearl Harbor 7 days later, operated in Hawaiian waters on training exercises. Beginning 12 April the minesweeper took up convoy escort duties, sailing to Eniwetok, Saipan, and finally to Okinawa, arriving Kerama Retto 30 May 1945.

Joining the massive naval forces taking part in the capture of Okinawa, Hilarity served as a picket ship off the bitterly contested island, protecting the transports and landing beaches. She remained at Okinawa until the Japanese surrender, and sailed 30 August to sweep mines around Korea and the Japanese home islands preparatory to the occupation. Hilarity operated in the harbors of Jinsen, Korea, and Nagasaki, as well as in the East China Sea during the remainder of 1945. The ship sailed 28 December from Sasebo for the United States, and arrived San Pedro, California, 6 February 1946 via Saipan, Eniwetok, and Pearl Harbor. Hilarity departed 26 February for New Orleans, Louisiana, via the Panama Canal, and decommissioned 26 August 1946 at Consolidated Shipyard, Orange, Texas. Hilarity received two battle stars for World War II service.

Hilarity was placed in the Atlantic Reserve Fleet, and remained there until being sold to Mexico on 30 August 1962. Her classification was changed to MSF-241 on 7 February 1955, while in reserve. Hilarity was sold to Mexico on 2 October 1962.

== Mexican Navy career ==
The former Hilarity was acquired by the Mexican Navy on 2 October 1962 and renamed ARM DM-02. She was stricken in 1986 and scrapped on 1 August 1988.
