= USS Scout (AM-296) =

Minesweeper of the United States Navy

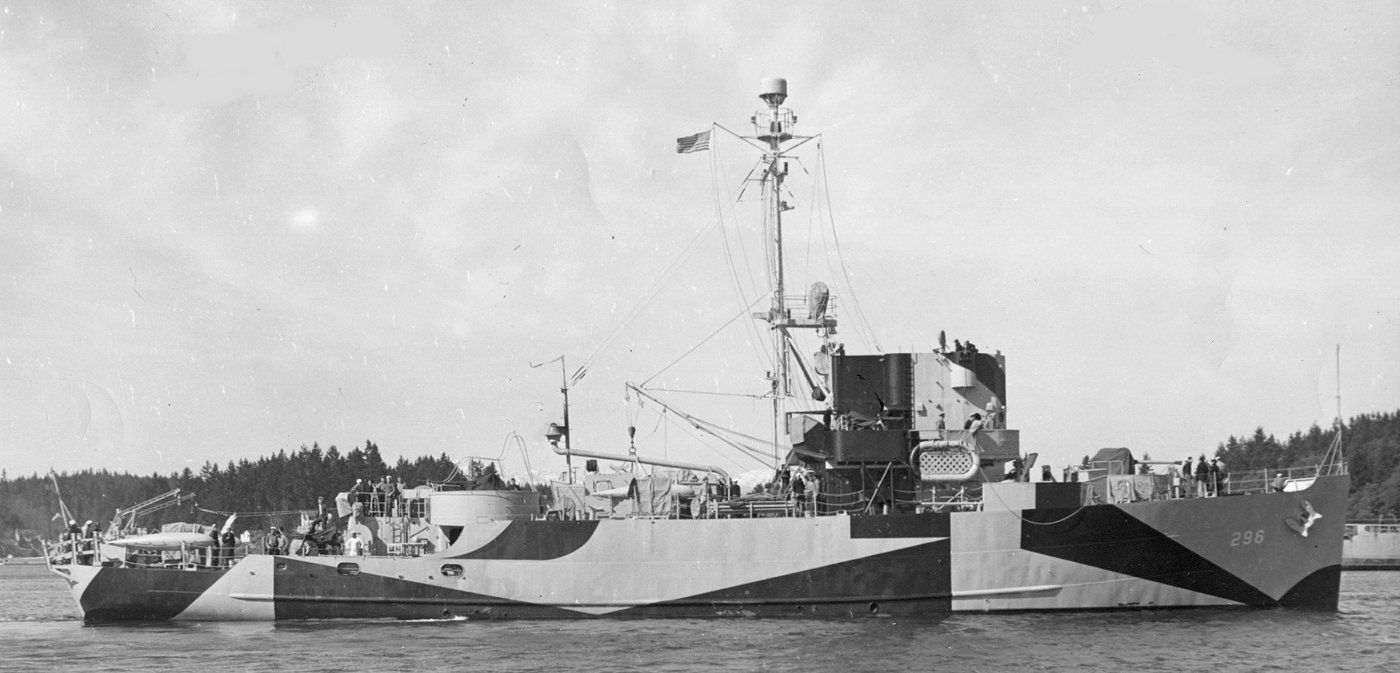
- Scout seen in March 1944

History

United States
- Name: USS Scout (AM-296)
- Builder: Winslow Marine Railway & Shipbuilding Company, Seattle
- Laid down: 8 February 1943
- Launched: 2 May 1943
- Sponsored by: Miss Mary Lou Lillehei
- Commissioned: 27 March 1944
- Decommissioned: 26 February 1947
- Recommissioned: 11 May 1951
- Decommissioned: 1 March 1954
- Reclassified: MSF-296, 7 February 1955
- Stricken: 1 May 1962
- Fate: Transferred to Mexican Navy, 1 October 1962

History

Mexico
- Name: ARM DM-09
- Acquired: 1 October 1962
- Fate: unknown

General characteristics
- Class & type: Admirable-class minesweeper
- Displacement: 650 long tons (660 t)
- Length: 184 ft 6 in (56.24 m)
- Beam: 33 ft (10 m)
- Draft: 9 ft 9 in (2.97 m)
- Propulsion: 2 × ALCO 539 diesel engines, 1,710 shp (1,280 kW); Farrel-Birmingham single reduction gear; 2 shafts
- Speed: 15 knots (28 km/h)
- Complement: 104
- Armament: 1 × 3"/50 caliber (76 mm) DP gun; 2 × twin Bofors 40 mm guns; 1 × Hedgehog anti-submarine mortar; 2 × Depth charge tracks

Service record
- Part of: U.S. Pacific Fleet (1944–1947); Atlantic Reserve Fleet (1947–1951, 1954–1962); U.S. Atlantic Fleet (1951–1954); Mexican Navy (from 1962)
- Operations: Philippines campaign (1944–45); Battle of Balikpapan (1945)
- Awards: Presidential Unit Citation; Navy Unit Commendation; 5 Battle stars

USS Scout (AM-296) was an Admirable-class minesweeper built for the United States Navy during World War II; she was the third U.S. Navy ship to bear the name. She was awarded 5 battle stars for service in the Pacific during World War II. She was decommissioned in February 1947 and placed in reserve. Although she did not see service in the war zone, Scout was recommissioned in May 1951 during the Korean War and remained in commission until March 1954, when she was placed in reserve again. While she remained in reserve, Scout was reclassified as MSF-296 in February 1955 but never reactivated. In October 1962, she was sold to the Mexican Navy and renamed ARM DM-09. Although she is reported out of service, her ultimate fate is not reported in secondary sources.

== U.S. Navy career ==
Scout was laid down on 8 February 1943 by Winslow Marine Railway and Shipbuilding Co., Seattle, Washington; launched on 2 May 1943; sponsored by Miss Mary Lou Lillehei; and commissioned on 3 March 1944. After shakedown, Scout sailed from San Francisco, California, on 15 May 1944 for Hawaii. Between June and September 1944 she escorted convoys between Pearl Harbor, Eniwetok, Kwajalein, Funafuti, and Tulagi, before reporting to the U.S. 7th Fleet at Manus on 6 October for the Leyte invasion. From 17 to 19 October, she carried out a pre-invasion sweep of Leyte; and, on the 20th, she joined Mine Division 34 in a four-day sweep of the main transport channel. She then anchored with the transports to provide antiaircraft support. Between 27 and 31 October Scout helped search for survivors at the scene of the Battle off Samar, where Rear Admiral Sprague's escort carriers had withstood the attack of a superior Japanese force. For the next month, she carried out local patrols and sweeps in the vicinity of Leyte.

Scout participated, with her division, in most of the subsequent landings in the Philippines. She carried out pre-invasion sweeps at Ormoc Bay on 6 December, Mindoro Island on 14 December, Lingayen Gulf on 6 January 1945, and Zambales and Subic Bay between 29 and 31 January. During and after the initial troop landings, she helped extend the mineswept areas and provided antisubmarine and antiaircraft protection to the transports anchored off the beaches. Few mines were encountered, but kamikaze resistance was intense; and, on 7 December Scout rescued survivors of one victim, USS Ward (APD-16).

On 13 February, Scout and her division began pre-invasion sweeps in Manila Bay in preparation for the landings at Mariveles and Corregidor. While sweeping off Corregidor on the 14th, the minesweepers came within 5,000 yards of the island and were repeatedly straddled by Japanese fire before supporting ships silenced the enemy's guns. Scout continued sweeping in Manila Bay through 19 February, and her division earned a Navy Unit Commendation for the operation. During the next one and one-half months, Scout carried out various local sweeps in support of mop-up operations in the Philippines, the most notable being a pre-assault sweep for the landings at Legaspi, Luzon, on 1 April. This was followed by a three-day exploratory sweep in the San Bernardino Strait, after which the ship returned to Subic Bay for a badly needed overhaul. She rejoined her division on 3 May and on 9 May arrived at Morotai to prepare for operations in the Netherlands East Indies.

Between 7 and 18 June Scout supported the landings at Brunei Bay, Borneo; and between 22 June and 8 July, she helped clear the way for the assault at Balikpapan. During both operations the minesweepers came under fire from shore batteries and one ship, USS Salute (AM-294), was sunk by a mine on 8 June. Scout's task unit won a Presidential Unit Citation for its service off Borneo between 15 June and 1 July.

After repairs at Subic Bay, Scout sailed for home, arriving at Seattle, Washington, on 11 September 1945. She reported to Orange, Texas, on 2 April 1946; was placed in reserve, in commission there on 10 May and placed in reserve, out of commission on 26 February 1947. Scout received 5 battle stars for her World War II service.

Due to the need for minecraft during the Korean War, Scout was recommissioned on 11 May 1951. After refresher training at Little Creek, Virginia, 9 July to 6 August 1951, she remained on the Atlantic coast and for two years, operated between her home port of Charleston, South Carolina, the Mine School at Yorktown, Virginia, and local operating areas. Then ordered inactivated, she arrived at Orange, Texas, on 31 October 1953 and was decommissioned on 1 March 1954.

While she remained in reserve, Scout was reclassified as MSF-296 in February 1955 but never reactivated. Struck from the Naval Vessel Register on 1 May 1962, she was transferred to the government of Mexico on 1 October 1962.

== Mexican Navy career ==
The former Scout was acquired by the Mexican Navy on 1 October 1962 and renamed ARM DM-09. Although she is reported out of service, her ultimate fate is not reported in secondary sources.
