= Rose Avenue =

Rose Avenue may refer to:

== Music ==
- Rose Avenue, a Finnish band featuring Jann Wilde
- Rose Ave., a 2014 album by You+Me

== Streets and locations ==
- Rose Avenue, a street in the neighborhood of Templestowe Lower, Victoria, Australia
- La Rose Avenue, a street in Etobicoke, Toronto, Ontario, Canada; see Humber Heights-Westmount
- Rose Avenue, a residence hall at UCLA, Los Angeles, California
- Rose Avenue, a street in Los Angeles, California, that starts in the Castle Heights neighborhood and ends in Venice
- Rose Avenue, a street in Staten Island, New York and location of New Dorp station
- Rose Avenue, a street in the community of Eagledale, Bainbridge Island, Washington, US

== See also ==
- 127 Rose Avenue, a 2099 album by Hank Williams, Jr.
- Rose (disambiguation)
- Rose Street
- Mount Rose Avenue (York)
- Mt. Rose Highway
