= USS Sentry =

USS Sentry may refer to the following ships of the United States Navy:

- USS Sentry (AM-299), was an Admirable-class minesweeper, launched in 1943; struck in 1962, and transferred to Vietnam as RVN Ky Hoa (HQ-09).
- USS Sentry (MCM-3), was an Avenger-class mine countermeasures ship, launched in 1986 and retired in 2025
