= USS Requisite =

Minesweeper of the United States Navy

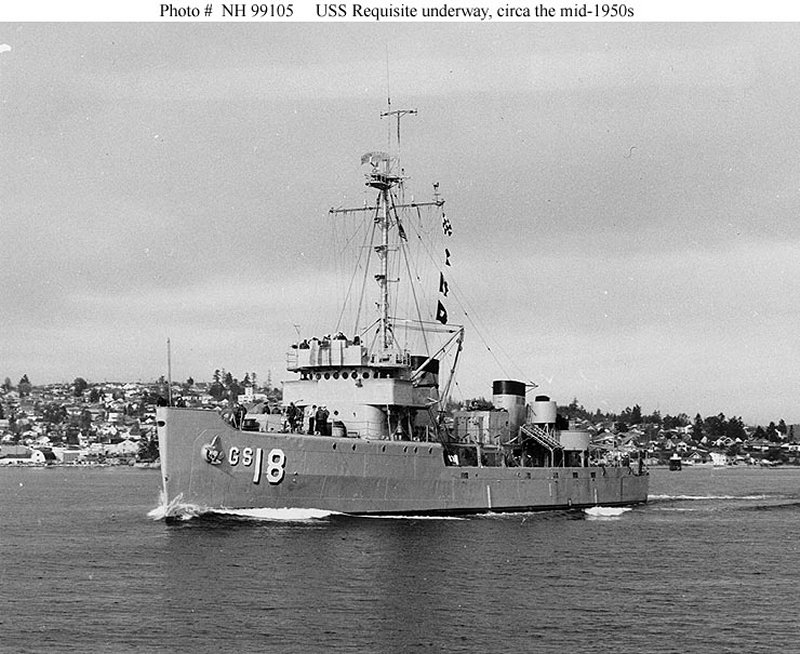

History

United States
- Name: USS Requisite
- Builder: Winslow Marine Railway and Shipbuilding Company, Seattle, Washington
- Laid down: 12 November 1941
- Launched: 25 July 1942
- Commissioned: 7 June 1943
- Decommissioned: 23 December 1947
- Recommissioned: 15 February 1950
- Decommissioned: 1 April 1964
- Reclassified: AGS-18, 18 August 1951
- Stricken: 1 April 1964
- Honours and awards: 8 battle stars (World War II)
- Fate: Sold for scrapping, March 1965

General characteristics
- Class & type: Auk-class minesweeper
- Displacement: 890 long tons (904 t)
- Length: 221 ft 3 in (67.44 m)
- Beam: 32 ft (9.8 m)
- Draft: 10 ft 9 in (3.28 m)
- Speed: 18 knots (33 km/h; 21 mph)
- Complement: 100 officers and enlisted
- Armament: 1 × 3"/50 caliber gun; 2 × 40 mm guns; 2 × 20 mm guns; 2 × Depth charge tracks; 5 × depth charge projectors

USS Requisite (AM-109) was an Auk-class minesweeper acquired by the United States Navy for the dangerous task of removing mines from minefields laid in the water to prevent ships from passing.

Requisite was laid down 12 November 1941 by the Winslow Marine Railway and Shipbuilding Company, Seattle, Washington; launched 25 July 1942; and commissioned 7 June 1943.

== World War II Pacific operations ==
Following shakedown off southern California, Requisite proceeded to San Francisco. Thence on 1 August, she escorted a convoy to Honolulu. Attached to Service Squadron 6, she trained in Hawaiian waters into October. On the 25th, she cleared Pearl Harbor and headed for the New Hebrides to prepare for her first amphibious operation, the invasion of Tarawa Atoll, in the Gilberts.

Departing Efate on 13 November, she took up her position as listening vessel at the lagoon entrance off Betio early on the morning of the 20th. While pre-invasion bombardment was in progress, she and Pursuit (AM-108) swept a channel from the transport area into the lagoon. Just prior to the landings, she took up duties as assistant control and survey ship and began marking the channel and searching out possible anchorages in the lagoon. On the 21st, she returned to the transport area and resumed screening duties.

As Tarawa was being secured, Requisite shifted to Abemama and assisted in the offloading of equipment and supplies for the garrison group. She then remained in the area until 12 December when she got underway for Pearl Harbor.

== Operating with Task Force 52 ==
On 22 January 1944, she sortied with Task Force TF 52 for the invasion of the Marshalls. In the antisubmarine screen of the Southern Attack Force, en route, she arrived off Kwajalein Atoll on the 31st. She continued her antisubmarine activities until 3 February, then began sweeping operations off Kwajalein and other islands in the southern part of the atoll. On the 6th, she planted navigational aids, and on the 15th, sortied with Task Group TG 51.11 for the Eniwetok assault.

Two days later, she entered Eniwetok lagoon between Japtan and Parry Islands. Sweeping and survey duties followed. On the 24th, she returned to Kwajalein and, through March escorted reconnaissance parties in LSTs and LCIs to Wotho, Ujae, Lae, Ailinglapalap, Namorik and other minor atolls and islands of the Marshalls.

On 10 April, she departed those islands and headed east with an LST convoy. On the 24th, she escorted her charges into Pearl Harbor and 2 days later continued on to San Francisco and overhaul.

On 16 July she returned to Hawaii. An escort run to Eniwetok and inter-island escort duty in Hawaii took her into September. Then, on the 23rd, she headed west for her next invasion target, the Philippines.

== Operations with the Seventh Fleet ==
Moving across the Pacific via Eniwetok, she joined the 7th Fleet at Manus on 10 October, and seven days later she commenced sweeping the approaches to Leyte Gulf. She continued her sweeping operations until the 24th, when she anchored in San Pedro Bay. Three days later, she began a five-day search for survivors of the battles for Leyte Gulf.

During November she swept in waters near Homonhon, Suluan, Calicoan, and Dinagat. In early December, she and Pursuit swept the Canigao Channel, West Passage, to provide a second access to the Camotes Sea. On the 6th, 7th, and 8th, Requisite participated in the Ormoc Bay assault, then returned to the east coast of Leyte.

On 2 January 1945, Requisite moved north with Task Group TG 77.6. The next day she entered the Sulu Sea. She passed Manila Bay on 5 January, and, on the 6th, she began sweeping operations in Lingayen Gulf which continued until the 14th. She then replenished at Leyte, and returned to Luzon on 29 January for pre-invasion sweeps off San Felipe in Zambales Province. On the 31st, she anchored in Subic Bay.

In February, Requisite with others of Mine Division 3, moved east to Guam, whence she continued to Ulithi. In mid-March she sortied with Mine Group 1 of the Okinawa invasion force.

== Okinawa operations ==
Arriving in the Ryūkyūs on the 24th, Requisite swept the approaches to Kerama Retto the same day. On the 25th, she extended operations to Keise Shima. The 26th saw her off southern Okinawa. From the 27th through the 29th, she operated off the Hagushi beaches and on the 30th and 31st she swept off the Motobu Peninsula and Ie Shima. She then retired to Kerama Retto.

Requisite remained in the Okinawa area, employed in screening and sweeping operations until 16 April. A month's respite in the Marianas followed; but by the end of May she was back in the Ryūkyūs. Through June, she continued patrol and sweeping duties off Okinawa. In July she began sweeping in the East China Sea in anticipation of an invasion of the Japanese home islands. Then, in August, she departed for an availability at Leyte. There when hostilities ceased, she returned to Okinawa at the end of the month and in September resumed sweeping operations, this time to clear Japanese waters for the arrival of occupation forces and the resumption of peacetime maritime traffic. Off Shikoku during early September, she shifted to Honshū at midmonth and during October operated in the Ise Wan area. On in November, she added the responsibility of communications and operational headquarter, CTG 52.8, to her duties and on 17 December she headed back to the United States.

== Post-War operations ==
The ship arrived at San Diego on 17 January 1946. The following month, she continued on to the U.S. East Coast arriving at Norfolk on 21 February. For the next year and a half she operated with the Atlantic Fleet towing targets for training groups. Then ordered inactivated, she proceeded to Orange, Texas, where she decommissioned and joined the Reserve Fleet on 23 December 1947.

== Operations as a survey ship ==
Recommissioned 15 February 1950, Requisite was assigned to hydrographic survey duties. She reported to the Atlantic Fleet for duty on 1 March and for the next three years she spent the winter survey season operating in the Caribbean and the warmer months off Labrador and Greenland. Reclassified AGS-18 on 18 August 1951, she discontinued her North Atlantic-Caribbean schedule in the fall of 1954. On 6 October she got underway from Norfolk; and, from 1 November 1954 to 2 February 1955, she conducted surveys from İskenderun, Turkey. Returned to Norfolk. They went west through the Panama Canal to San Diego, then to Seattle. 1955

Requisite shifted to the northern Pacific. She arrived at her new homeport, Seattle, June 1955-Captain Robert F. Hopkins, in late June and before the end of the month had commenced Arctic operations. Arrived Nome Alaska July 3 rd and some of the crew marched in the 4 th of July Parade in Nome. By mid-September she had surveyed routes from Herschel Island to Shepherd Bay, taking continuous soundings and compiling bathythermograph information and gathering core samplings every 20 miles. She continued her operations from Seattle until July 1958. Then homeported at San Francisco, California, she remained in the Pacific, ranging from the Arctic to Polynesia, to Central America until the spring of 1959.

On 1 May 1959, she got underway for Philadelphia, Pennsylvania. Arriving on the 23rd, she resumed operations with ServRon 8, Atlantic Fleet and during the summer operated in the Caribbean. In November, she sailed east for her first survey season in the Persian Gulf. During the 1960–61 season she returned to the Persian Gulf, but remained in the Atlantic, the Caribbean, and off New England during the 1961–62 season. On 1 July 1962, she sailed for Iceland and a return to survey operations of Greenland, completing that mission in November. In January 1963, she sailed to the West Indies, operated there through the summer, and returned to Philadelphia, Pennsylvania in early November.

== Decommissioning ==
Ordered inactivated she reported to the Philadelphia Group, Atlantic Reserve Fleet, on 23 December. She was decommissioned and struck from the Navy list on 1 April 1964.

== Awards ==
- Asiatic-Pacific Campaign Medal with eight battle stars
- World War II Victory Medal
- Navy Occupation Medal
- National Defense Service Medal with star
