= USS Sentry (AM-299) =

Minesweeper of the United States Navy

History

United States
- Name: USS Sentry
- Builder: Winslow Marine Railway and Shipbuilding Company, Seattle
- Laid down: 16 May 1943
- Launched: 15 August 1943
- Sponsored by: Miss Nanette L. Pratt
- Commissioned: 30 May 1944
- Decommissioned: 19 June 1946
- Reclassified: MSF-299, 7 February 1955
- Stricken: 1 February 1962
- Fate: Transferred to South Vietnam, 21 August 1962

History

Republic of Vietnam Navy
- Name: RVNS Ky Hoa (HQ-09)
- Acquired: 21 August 1962
- Fate: Captured by North Vietnam, 30 April 1975. To Vietnam People's Navy

History

Vietnam People's Navy
- Name: HQ-05
- Acquired: 21 August 1962
- Fate: Captured by North Vietnam, 30 April 1975. To Vietnam People's Navy

General characteristics
- Class & type: Admirable-class minesweeper
- Displacement: 650 tons
- Length: 184 ft 6 in (56.24 m)
- Beam: 33 ft (10 m)
- Draft: 9 ft 9 in (2.97 m)
- Propulsion: 2 × ALCO 539 diesel engines, 1,710 shp (1.3 MW); Farrel-Birmingham single reduction gear; 2 shafts
- Speed: 14.8 knots (27.4 km/h)
- Complement: 104
- Armament: 1 × 3"/50 caliber gun DP; 2 × twin Bofors 40 mm guns; 1 × Hedgehog anti-submarine mortar; 2 × Depth charge tracks

Service record
- Part of: US Pacific Fleet (1944-1946); Atlantic Reserve Fleet (1946-1962)
- Operations: Philippines campaign (1944–45); Borneo campaign (1945); Vietnam War; Cambodian–Vietnamese War
- Awards: Presidential Unit Citation; Navy Unit Commendation; 6 Battle stars

USS Sentry (AM-299) was an Admirable-class minesweeper built for the United States Navy during World War II. She served in the Pacific Ocean and was awarded six battle stars, a Navy Unit Commendation, and a Presidential Unit Citation. She was decommissioned and placed in reserve in 1946. In August 1962, the former Sentry was transferred to South Vietnam as RVNS Ky Hoa (HQ-09) in the Republic of Vietnam Navy. Her fate after 1962 is unreported in secondary sources.

== U.S. Navy career ==
Sentry was laid down on 16 May 1943 by the Winslow Marine Railway and Shipbuilding Co., Seattle, Washington; launched on 15 August 1943 sponsored by Miss Nanette L. Pratt, and commissioned on 30 May 1944. After shakedown, Sentry sailed from San Francisco, California, on 28 August 1944 and joined the U.S. 7th Fleet at Manus on 6 October for the Leyte invasion. She arrived off the Leyte beaches on 17 October and carried out a three-day pre-invasion sweep. She continued sweeping during and after the initial landings on 20 October until joining the transports on 24 October to provide antiaircraft support.

Sentry remained in Leyte Gulf for the next six weeks then participated in most of the subsequent landings in the Philippines. With her division, Mine Division 34 she carried out pre-invasion sweeps at Ormoc Bay on 6 December 1944, Mindoro Island on 14 December Lingayen Gulf on 6 January 1945, and Zambales and Subic Bay on 29–31 January. For all but the Ormoc landings, she remained on the scene after the initial troop landings, helping extend the mineswept areas and providing antisubmarine and antiaircraft protection to the transports. Many mines were encountered, and kamikaze resistance was intense, and the ships saw much antiaircraft action.

On 13 February, Sentry and her division began pre-invasion sweeps in Manila Bay in preparation for the landings at Mariveles and Corregidor. While sweeping off Corregidor on the 14th, the minesweepers came within 5,000 yards of the island and were repeatedly straddled by Japanese fire before supporting ships silenced the enemy's guns. Sentry continued sweeping in Manila Bay through 19 February, and her division earned a Navy Unit Commendation for the operation.

During the next two and one-half months, Sentry carried out various local sweeps in support of mop-up operations in the Philippines, the most notable being a pre-assault sweep for the landings at Legaspi, Luzon on 1 April, and an 8-day sweep in the Sulu Sea off Palawan beginning on 22 April. On 9 May, the ship arrived at Morotai to prepare for operations in the Netherlands East Indies.

Between 7 and 18 June, Sentry supported the landings at Brunei Bay, Borneo; and, between 22 June and 15 July, she helped clear the way for the assault at Balikpapan. During both operations, the minesweepers came under fire from shore batteries; and one ship, USS Salute (AM-294), was sunk by a mine on 8 June. Sentry's task unit received a Presidential Unit Citation for its service off Borneo between 15 June and 1 July 1945.

After overhaul at Subic Bay, Sentry departed the Philippines on 8 September and arrived at Sasebo Japan, on 20 October, having accepted the surrender of the Japanese army garrison of Shan Zaki in the Ryukyus while en route. In the following weeks, she swept Japanese minefields in the Ryukyus, the Tsushima Strait, and the Van Diemen Strait. She sailed from Sasebo on 9 December for the United States. Arriving at Orange, Texas, on 2 April 1946, she was decommissioned there on 19 June 1946 and placed in reserve. In addition to her six battle stars for World War II service, Sentry was also awarded a Navy Unit Commendation and a Presidential Unit Citation.

While she remained in reserve, Sentry's classification was changed to MSF-299, effective 7 February 1955. Sentry was struck from the Navy list on 1 February 1962 and transferred to South Vietnam on 31 August 1962.

== Republic of Vietnam Navy career ==
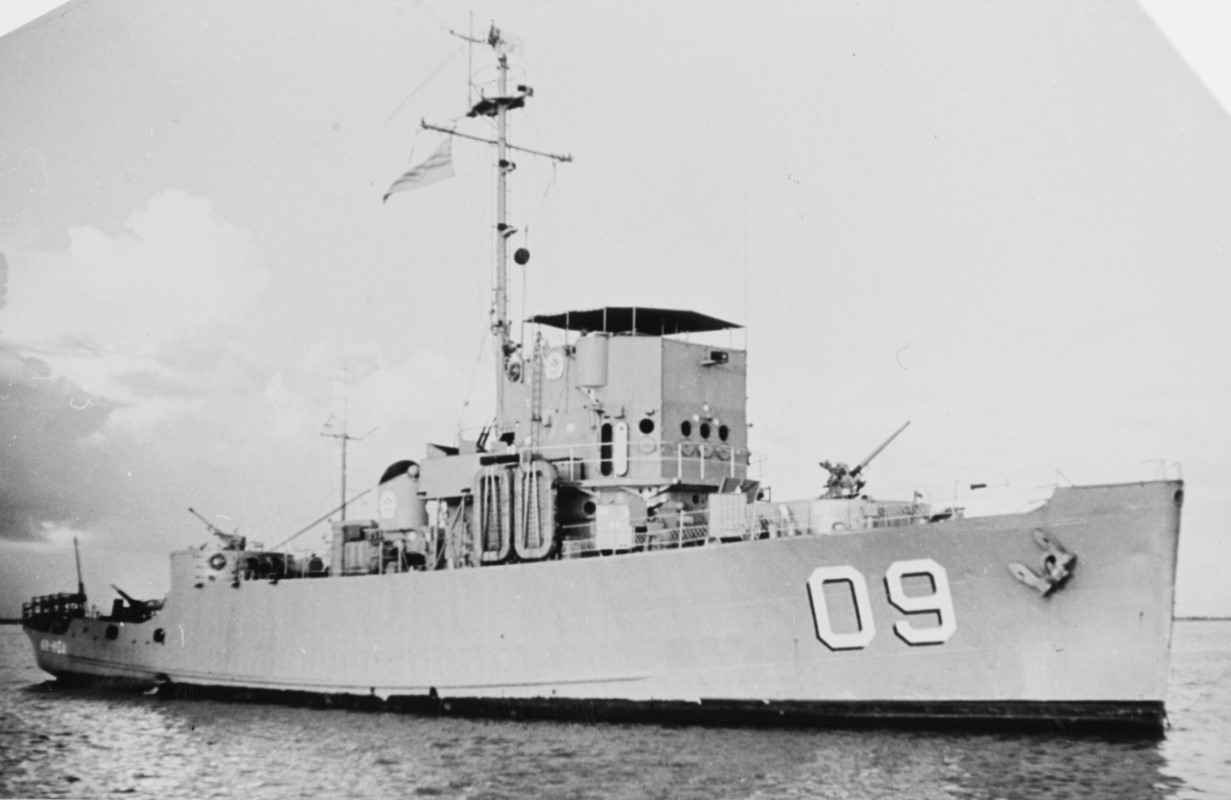

The former Sentry was transferred to South Vietnam's navy, the Republic of Vietnam Navy, on 31 August 1962 as RVNS Ky Hoa (HQ-09). Her fate after that date is unreported in secondary sources.

In late April 30, 1975, Ky Hoa (HQ-09) had to be repaired at South Vietnam Navy Shipyard Factory (Ba Son) in Saigon, then until the collapse of South Vietnam Government, she was left at the Ba Son Shipyard dock and had been captured by the Communist Army when they won the Vietnam War.
