= USS Garland (AM-238) =

Minesweeper of the United States Navy

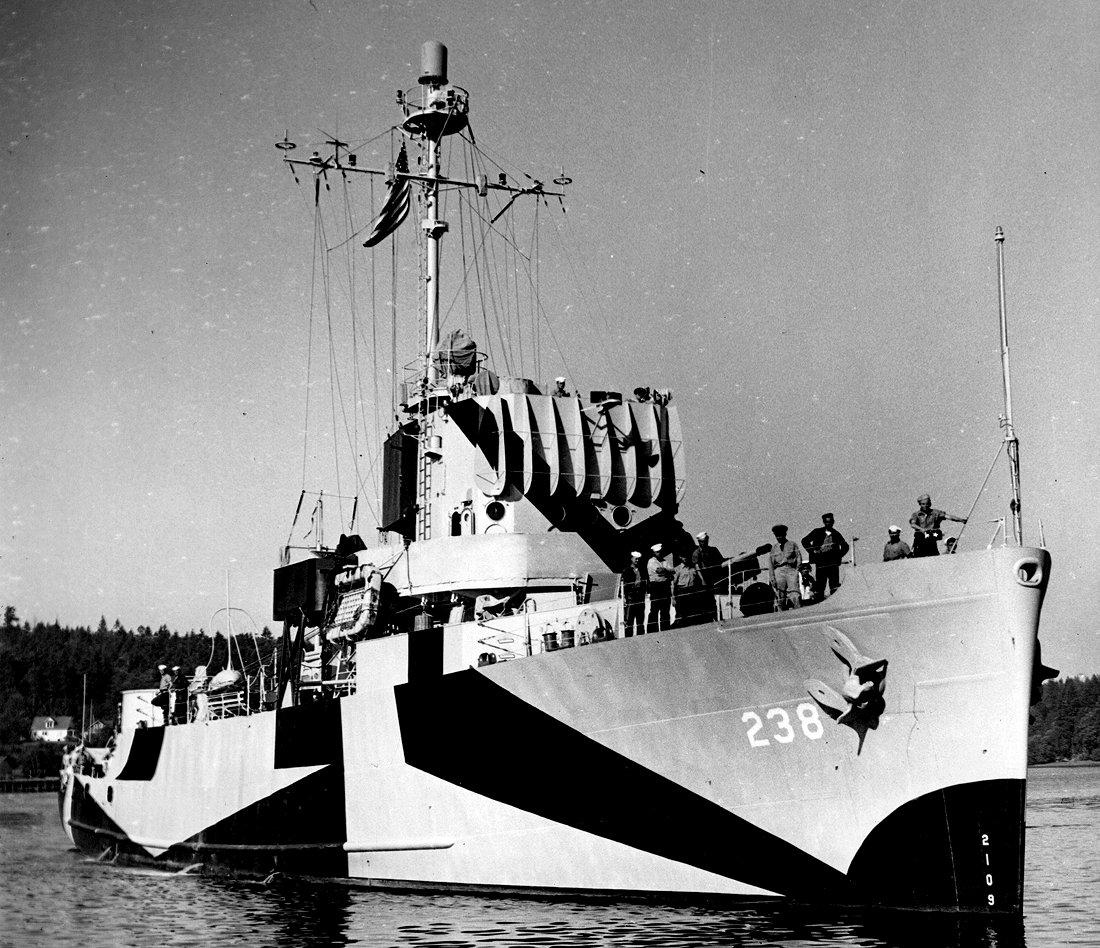
- Garland in Puget Sound, Washington in late 1944

History

United States
- Name: USS Garland
- Builder: Winslow Marine Railway & Shipbuilding,
- Laid down: 13 October 1943
- Launched: 20 February 1944
- Commissioned: 26 August 1944
- Decommissioned: 2 August 1946
- Reclassified: MSF-238, 7 February 1955
- Stricken: 1 April 1960
- Fate: Sold 24 October 1960

General characteristics
- Class & type: Admirable-class minesweeper
- Displacement: 650 tons
- Length: 184 ft 6 in (56.24 m)
- Beam: 33 ft (10 m)
- Draft: 9 ft 9 in (2.97 m)
- Propulsion: 2 × ALCO 539 diesel engines, 1,710 shp (1.3 MW); Farrel-Birmingham single reduction gear; 2 shafts
- Speed: 14.8 knots (27.4 km/h)
- Complement: 104
- Armament: 1 × 3"/50 caliber gun DP; 2 × twin Bofors 40 mm guns; 1 × Hedgehog anti-submarine mortar; 2 × Depth charge tracks

Service record
- Part of: US Pacific Fleet (1944-1946); Atlantic Reserve Fleet (1946-1960)
- Awards: 2 Battle stars

USS Garland (AM-238) was an Admirable-class minesweeper built for the U.S. Navy during World War II. She was built to clear minefields in offshore waters, and served the Navy in the Pacific Ocean. At war's end, she returned home with two battle stars to her credit.

Garland was launched 20 February 1944 by Winslow Marine Railway & Shipbuilding Co., Winslow, Washington; sponsored by Miss Karen Lundberg; and commissioned 26 August 1944.

== World War II Pacific Ocean operations ==
After shakedown out of Puget Sound Garland departed San Pedro, Los Angeles, 12 November with a convoy to Kossol Roads, Palau Islands, where she arrived 2 January 1945. The minesweeper acted as entrance control ship at Naval Base Kossol Roads; escorted convoys between Peleliu and Ulithi until 20 May, then patrolled convoy routes between Ulithi and Eniwetok. She departed Ulithi 28 June escorting a 16-ship convoy bound for Buckner Bay, Okinawa, arriving 17 July.

== End-of-War Activity ==
Based at Buckner Bay, Garland swept mines in the East China Sea (22–31 July 1945) and (13–25 August 1945). Shifting to Ominato Ko, Honshū, she swept Japanese minefields to clear the path for Allied transports carrying occupation troops to the Empire. Garland departed Ominato Ko 20 October to serve as flagship of Mine Division 40 at Sasebo until 20 November when she sailed for the United States, arriving San Diego, California, 19 December.

== Post-War Decommissioning ==
Departing San Diego 31 January 1946, she transited the Panama Canal and steamed to Orange, Texas; decommissioned there 2 August 1946; and joined the Atlantic Reserve Fleet. Reclassified MSF-238 7 February 1955, Garland remained in the Reserve Fleet until struck from the Navy list 1 April 1960. She was sold to Ships and Power, Inc., of Miami, Florida, 24 October 1960.

Garland received two battle stars for World War II service.
