= USS Shelter =

Admirable-class minesweeper of the United States Navy

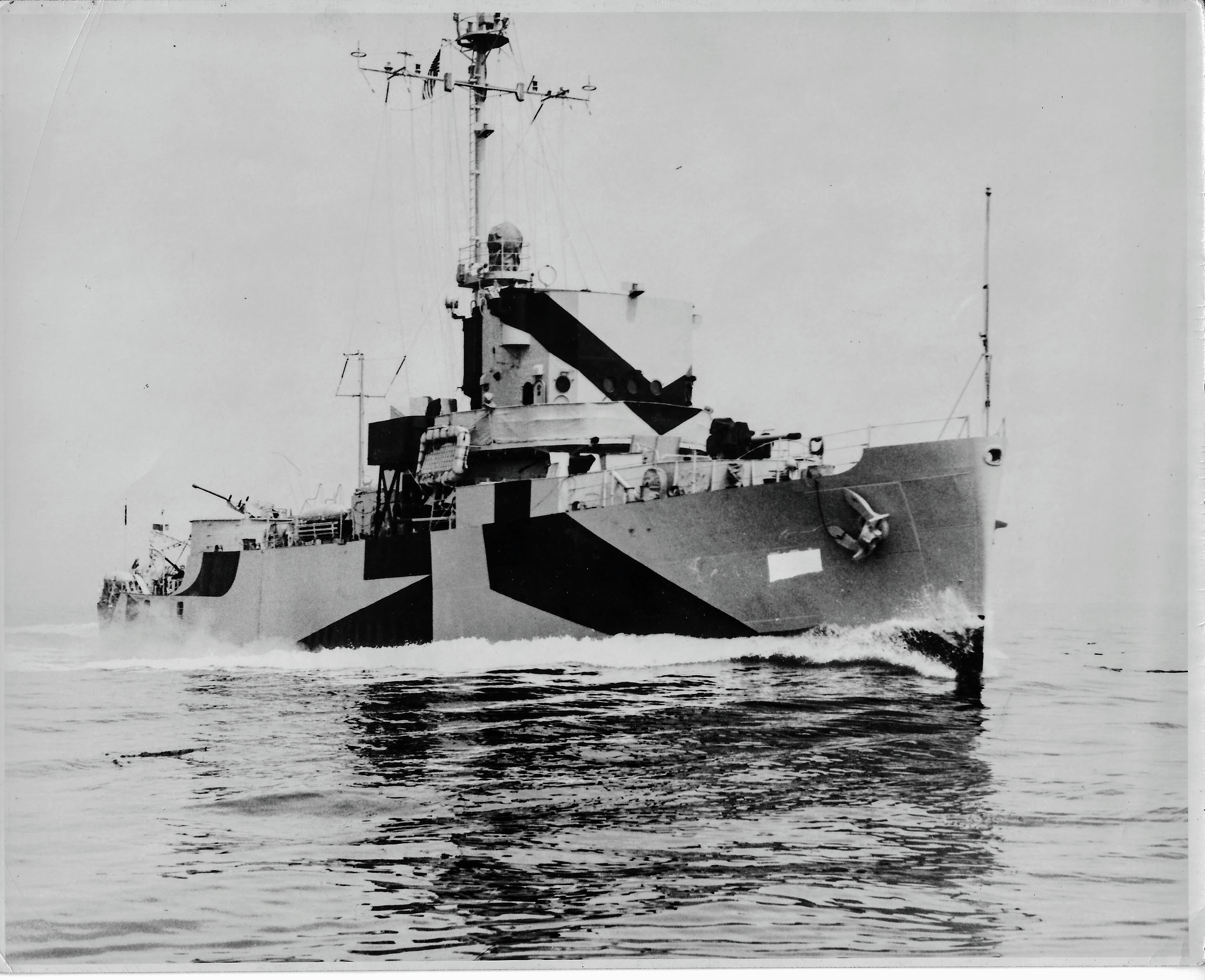
- Shelter under way, 1944

History

United States
- Name: USS Shelter (AM-301)
- Builder: Winslow Marine Railway & Shipbuilding, Winslow, Washington
- Laid down: 16 August 1943
- Launched: 14 November 1943
- Commissioned: 9 July 1944
- Decommissioned: 7 June 1946
- Reclassified: MSF-301, 7 February 1955
- Stricken: 1 August 1963
- Fate: transferred to Republic of Vietnam Navy, 24 January 1964

South Vietnam
- Name: RVNS Chi Linh (HQ-11)
- Acquired: 24 January 1964
- Fate: escaped to the Philippines after the fall of South Vietnam, April 1975

Philippines
- Name: RPS Datu Tupas (PS-18)
- Namesake: Datu Tupas, a chieftain of Cebu
- Acquired: 1975
- Commissioned: 5 April 1976
- Fate: unknown

General characteristics
- Class & type: Admirable-class minesweeper (in U.S. Navy service); Miguel Malvar-class corvette (in Philippine Navy service)
- Displacement: 650 tons
- Length: 184 ft 6 in (56.24 m)
- Beam: 33 ft (10 m)
- Draft: 9 ft 9 in (2.97 m)
- Installed power: 1,710 shp (1.3 MW)
- Propulsion: 2 × ALCO 539 diesel engines; 2 shafts
- Speed: 14.8 knots (27.4 km/h)
- Complement: 104
- Armament: 1 × 3"/50 caliber gun; 6 × Oerlikon 20 mm cannon; 2 × Bofors 40 mm gun (the normal 2 × twin mounts unavailable; Single Mounts were used); 1 × Hedgehog anti-submarine mortar; 4 × Depth charge projectors; 2 × Depth charge racks; 2 × Minesweeping paravanes; 2 × O-type Minesweeping Gear for moored mines; 1 × Jackhammer Diaphragm System for Acoustic Mines; 1 × 450 KW Generator and 2 × cable 440 Yard Cable for magnetic mines

USS Shelter (AM-301) was an Admirable-class minesweeper built for the United States Navy during World War II. After service in the Pacific during World War II, Shelter was decommissioned in June 1946 and placed in reserve. In January 1964, she was transferred to South Vietnam for service in the Republic of Vietnam Navy as RVNS Chi Linh (HQ-11). She remained in South Vietnamese service until the collapse of that country in 1975. Chi Linh was one of several ships that fled from South Vietnam to the Philippines. She was then commissioned into the Philippine Navy in April 1976 as RPS Datu Tupas (PS-18), named after a chieftain of Cebu. The ship's fate is not reported in secondary sources.

== U.S. Navy service ==
Shelter was laid down on 16 August 1943 by Winslow Marine Railway and Shipbuilding Company of Winslow, Washington. The ship was launched on 14 November 1943, sponsored by Miss Patricia Whittenberg, and commissioned on 9 July 1944.

Shelter conducted shakedown training at San Pedro and sailed from San Francisco on 21 October as escort unit for a convoy which entered Pearl Harbor on 30 October. Returned to San Francisco escorting merchant ships. On Thanksgiving Day, Shelter left San Francisco and returned to Pearl Harbor. After assault minesweeping exercises off Maui she departed Pearl Harbor on 5 January with an amphibious assault force, which Shelter escorted to Saipan.

Shelter then continued to Tinian for supplies and then escorted USS Guide, flagship of COMMINEPAC to Iwo Jima, arriving off the island on 16 February 1945. She made pre-invasion sweeps with Mine Division 36, consisting of six ships, which was ordered to fire on shore, and to retire if fire was returned. They retired on being fired at, possibly because one of the other ships had destroyed a Japanese radar emplacement, and a larger ship then attacked the revealed emplacements. Troops stormed ashore on 19 February and Shelter remained on patrol and screening station until 28 February, then helped guard an amphibious group (damaged LSTs) to Saipan before proceeding to Ulithi, Western Caroline Islands, arriving on 9 March for logistics and preparations for the coming Okinawa campaign. At an unknown time prior to the campaign, USS Shelter was refitted to add a combat operations center which replaced the captain's bunk on the bridge (one level below the flying bridge). This was a possible reason for recommissioning in 1964. Shelter had only surface radar, so information on incoming hostile aircraft was relayed with a bearing and the estimated time of arrival from a point ashore; this was converted to a bearing and time of arrival at Shelter, and relayed from Shelter to the other ships in the battle group.

On 19 March 1945, Shelter departed Ulithi with Mine Group 2 for exploratory sweeps in the Kerama Retto area and the western side of Okinawa, from 26 March until the initial invasion landings on 1 April. Division 36 also, on D-Day minus one, destroyed mines at the landing site with gunfire, as the water was too shallow to sweep. She made assault sweeps at Ie Shima on 8 and 14 April, served on antisubmarine patrol, and departed on 4 May for Ulithi, thence to San Pedro Bay, Leyte, Philippine Islands. Lieutenant Lancaster then assumed command. Here, she joined a convoy which reached Okinawa on the 29th. The following three weeks were largely taken up with sweeping of minefields off Myako Jima in the East China Sea. She stood out of Kerama Retto on 8 July 1945 as escort unit for LST Group 45, which entered San Pedro Bay on 13 July and departed Leyte Gulf on 19 August with a convoy that reached Okinawa on the 24th. Six days later, she sailed with a minesweeping task unit that swept the Arcadia minefields in the Yellow Sea in preparation for the landing of occupation forces on the Korean peninsula by the Ninth Fleet on 7 September 1945. She then proceeded to the western coast of Kyushu, Japan, for minesweeping in approaches to Nagasaki and Sasebo, where Lieutenant Douglas Giddings assumed command, clearing 22 moored mines and obstructions from 9 to 16 September 1945.

Shelter departed Nagasaki on 26 September 1945 for repairs at Sasebo, then spent 11 to 17 October sweeping 83 Japanese mines in the Tsushima Strait. She repeated this operation 1 to 12 November, sweeping 69 more mines, then became reference ship for a unit of three Japanese Coastal Defense ships sweeping shallow mine lines southeast of Tsushima until 16 November 1945. She joined Mine Squadron Twelve on 27 November acting as reference ship until completion of sweeping operations in Tsushima Strait on 4 December 1945. She departed Wakayama, Japan, for home on 11 December, touching Eniwetok, Pearl Harbor, and San Diego, where LT JG Samuel F. Melcher Jr assumed command on her way to Galveston, Texas, arriving on 3 February 1946. She shifted to Orange, Texas on 5 April, was decommissioned there by Lt (Jg) John Redmond on 7 June 1946, and placed in the Texas Group, United States Atlantic Reserve Fleet. Shelter received six battle stars for service in World War II.

While she remained in reserve, her hull classification was changed from AM-301 to MSF-301 on 7 February 1955. The ship remained in reserve until 15 July 1963, when she commenced conversion to a patrol and escort craft in the Philadelphia Naval Shipyard. She was struck from the Navy List on 1 August 1963 and was transferred on loan to the government of South Vietnam on 24 January 1964, under terms of the Military Assistance Program.

== Republic of Vietnam Navy service ==
On 24 January 1964, the former Shelter was transferred to South Vietnam. She served in the Republic of Vietnam Navy as RVNS Chi Linh (HQ-11). After the fall of South Vietnam in 1975, she was one of several ships that escaped to the Philippines and were later commissioned into the Philippine Navy.

== Philippine Navy service ==
Renamed RPS Datu Tupas (PS-18) in honor of Datu Tupas, a chieftain of Cebu, the vessel was commissioned into the Philippine Navy on 5 April 1976. She was classified by the Philippine Navy as a Miguel Malvar-class corvette, which incorporated members of three different U.S. Navy ship classes, all of which were based on the same hull design. Magat Salamat differed slightly from other ships of the Migual Malvar class because of minor structural differences from her original construction and weapons complement.

The ship's fate is not reported in secondary sources. If she remained in commission beyond July 1980, when the Philippine Navy changed their ship prefix from RPS to BRP, the ship would have become BRP Datu Tupas at that time.

== Gallery ==
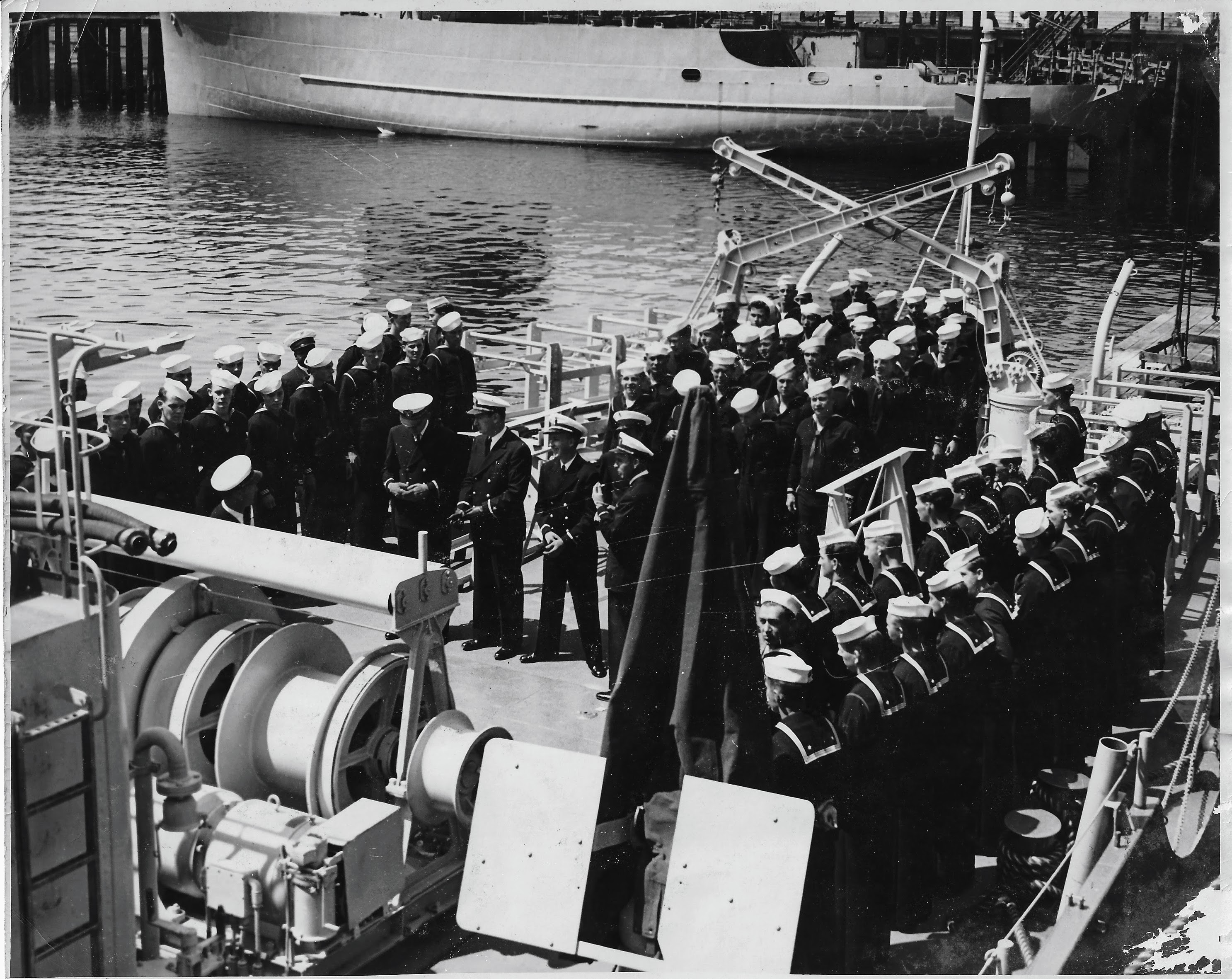
Crew assembled for commissioning

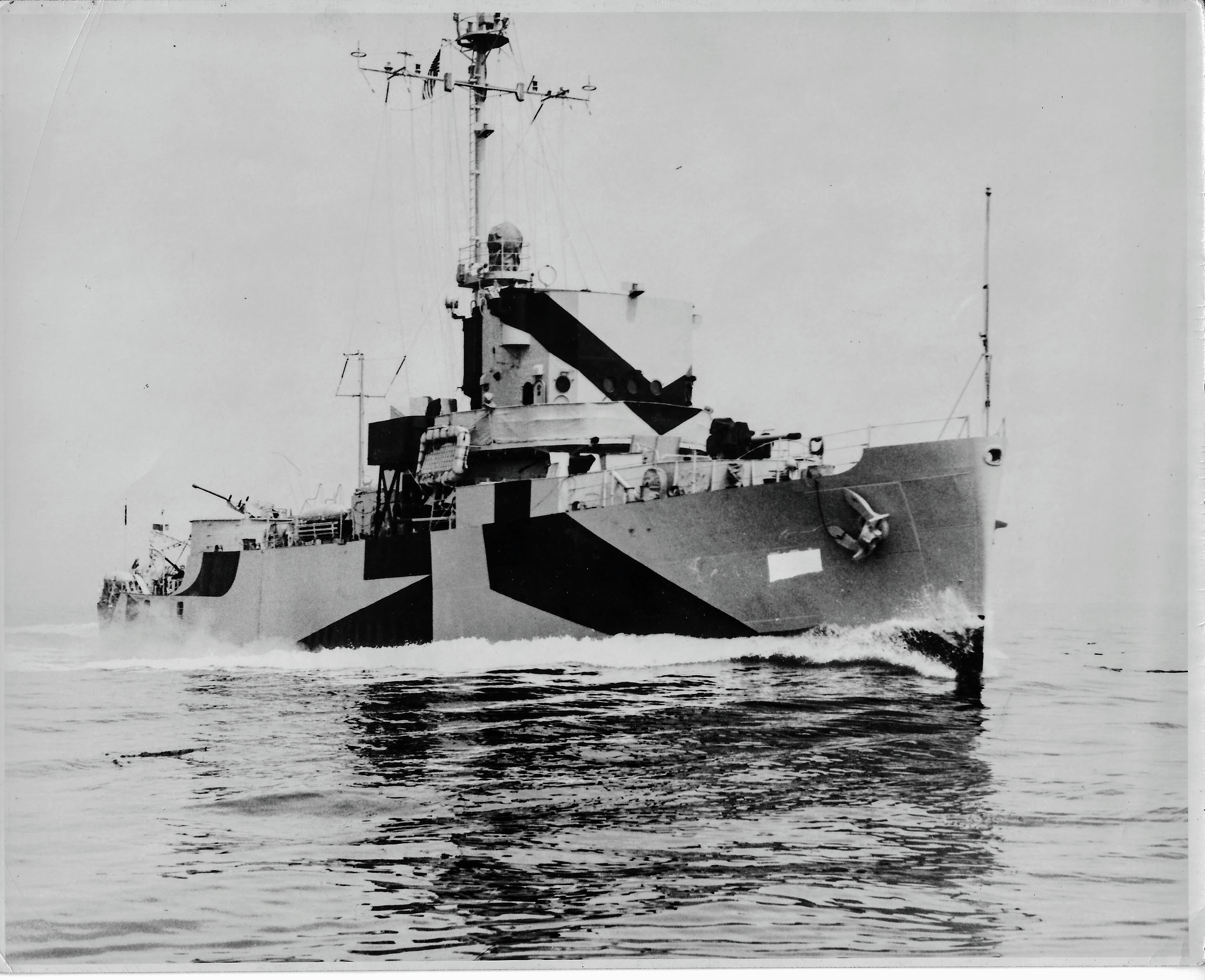
On shakedown cruises near Winslow, Washington in 1944
