= USS Saunter =

Minesweeper of the United States Navy

History

United States
- Name: USS Saunter
- Builder: Winslow Marine Railway and Shipbuilding Company
- Laid down: 23 November 1942
- Launched: 20 February 1943
- Commissioned: 22 January 1944
- Decommissioned: 27 October 1945
- Stricken: 13 November 1945
- Fate: Transferred to the Maritime Commission, 24 April 1946

General characteristics
- Class & type: Admirable-class minesweeper
- Displacement: 650 tons
- Length: 184 ft 6 in (56.24 m)
- Beam: 33 ft (10 m)
- Draft: 9 ft 9 in (2.97 m)
- Propulsion: 2 × ALCO 539 diesel engines, 1,710 shp (1.3 MW); Farrel-Birmingham single reduction gear; 2 shafts
- Speed: 14.8 knots (27.4 km/h)
- Complement: 104
- Armament: 1 × 3"/50 caliber gun DP; 2 × twin Bofors 40 mm guns; 1 × Hedgehog anti-submarine mortar; 2 × Depth charge tracks

Service record
- Part of: US Pacific Fleet (1944-1945)
- Operations: Philippines campaign (1944–45)
- Awards: 3 Battle stars

USS Saunter (AM-295) was an Admirable-class minesweeper built for the U.S. Navy during World War II. She was built to clear minefields in offshore waters.

Saunter was laid down on 23 November 1942 by Winslow Marine Railway and Shipbuilding Co., Seattle, Washington, launched on 20 February 1943; sponsored by Mrs. Merle Black, and commissioned on 22 January 1944.

== World War II Pacific Theatre operations ==
After shakedown, Saunter sailed from San Francisco, California, on 1 April 1944 for Hawaii, and commenced three months of convoy duty between Pearl Harbor, Majuro, Midway Island, and Kwajalein. Between 6 and 15 August, she swept an old United States minefield in the French Frigate Shoals, northwest of Oahu. She arrived at Manus in mid-September and reported to the 7th Fleet for the Leyte invasion.

== Searching for survivors ==
On 20 October, she joined her division, Mine Division 34, off the Leyte beaches for a four-day minesweep of the main transport channel, and then anchored with the transports to provide antiaircraft support. Between 27 and 31 October, she helped search for survivors at the scene of the Battle off Samar, where Rear Admiral Sprague's escort carriers had withstood the attack of a superior Japanese force. For the next month, she carried out local patrols and sweeps in the vicinity of Leyte.

== Supporting Philippine Islands Invasion ==
Saunter participated with her Division in most of the subsequent landings in the Philippines. She carried out pre-invasion sweeps at Ormoc Bay on 6 December; Mindoro Island on 14 December; Lingayen Gulf on 6 January 1945; and Zambales and Subic Bay from 29 through 31 January. During and after the initial troop landings, she helped extend the mineswept areas and provided antisubmarine and antiaircraft protection for the transports anchored off the beaches.

== Under attack by kamikaze aircraft ==
Few mines were encountered, but kamikaze resistance was intense, and, on 7 December, Saunter tried unsuccessfully to control fires aboard one kamikaze victim, USS Ward (APD-16). During the Mindoro operation, Saunter briefly went aground on a reef, damaging a propeller.

== Straddled by Japanese battery fire ==
On 13 February Saunter and her division began pre-invasion sweeps in Manila Bay in preparation for the landings at Mariveles and Corregidor. While sweeping off Corregidor on the 14th, the minesweepers came within 5,000 yards of the island and were repeatedly straddled by Japanese fire before supporting ships silenced the enemy's guns. Saunter continued sweeping in Manila Bay through 19 February, and her division earned a Navy Unit Commendation for the period from 14 to 18 February.

== Struck by a mine and nearly sunk ==
On 26 February, Saunter returned to Manila Bay to assist in harbor clearance sweeps. Shortly after noon, she struck a mine which blew a large hole in her bottom. Damage control parties contained the flooding, and the ship was towed back to Subic Bay.

A party of officers and men from the USS DYSON DD-572 went aboard the SAUNTER and helped to save her.

== Stateside evaluation and decommissioning ==
She remained there until towed back to the United States, arriving at San Francisco, California, on 15 August. Saunter was decommissioned on 27 October 1945, struck from the Navy list on 13 November 1945, and transferred to the Maritime Commission for disposal on 24 April 1946. Her ultimate fate is not known.

== Awards ==
Saunter received three battle stars for her World War II service.
