= USS Scuffle =

Admirable class minesweeper sunk as an artificial reef off Cozumel

History

United States
- Name: USS Scuffle (AM-298)
- Builder: Winslow Marine Railway & Shipbuilding Company, Seattle
- Laid down: 4 May 1943
- Launched: 8 August 1943
- Sponsored by: Miss Marianne Baron
- Commissioned: 2 May 1944
- Decommissioned: 19 June 1946
- Reclassified: MSF-298, 7 February 1955
- Stricken: 1 May 1962
- Fate: Transferred to Mexican Navy, 1 October 1962

Mexico
- Name: ARM DM-05
- Acquired: 1 October 1962
- Renamed: ARM General Felipe Xicoténcatl (C53), 1994
- Namesake: Felipe Xicoténcatl
- Stricken: 2000
- Fate: Sunk as an artificial reef

General characteristics
- Class & type: Admirable-class minesweeper
- Displacement: 650 long tons (660 t)
- Length: 184 ft 6 in (56.24 m)
- Beam: 33 ft (10 m)
- Draft: 9 ft 9 in (2.97 m)
- Propulsion: 2 × ALCO 539 diesel engines, 1,710 shp (1,280 kW); Farrel-Birmingham single reduction gear; 2 shafts
- Speed: 15 knots (28 km/h)
- Complement: 104
- Armament: 1 × 3"/50 caliber (76 mm) DP gun; 2 × twin Bofors 40 mm guns; 1 × Hedgehog anti-submarine mortar; 2 × Depth charge tracks

Service record
- Part of: U.S. Pacific Fleet (1944–1946); Atlantic Reserve Fleet (1946–1962); Mexican Navy (1962–2000)
- Operations: Philippines campaign (1944–45)
- Awards: Presidential Unit Citation; 5 Battle stars

USS Scuffle (AM-298) was an Admirable-class minesweeper built for the United States Navy during World War II. She was awarded a Presidential Unit Citation and five battle stars for service in the Pacific during World War II. She was decommissioned in June 1946 and placed in reserve. While remaining in reserve, Scuffle was reclassified as MSF-298 in February 1955, but never reactivated. In October 1962, she was sold to the Mexican Navy and renamed ARM DM-05. In 1994, she was renamed ARM General Felipe Xicoténcatl (C53). She was sunk as an artificial reef and dive attraction off Cozumel in 1999, and was stricken from the rolls of the Mexican Navy in 2000.

== U.S. Navy career ==
Scuffle was laid down on 4 May 1943 by Winslow Marine Railway and Shipbuilding Co., Seattle, Washington; launched on 8 August 1943; sponsored by Miss Marianne Baron, and commissioned on 2 May 1944. After shakedown, Scuffle sailed from San Francisco, California, on 11 July 1944 for Hawaii. Operating out of Pearl Harbor, she swept an old American-laid minefield in the French Frigate Shoals between 6 and 15 August, escorted a convoy to Eniwetok, and carried out various tests and training operations. She arrived at San Pedro Bay, Leyte, on 31 December 1944 and joined Mine Division 34.

With her division, Scuffle participated in the pre-invasion sweeps at Lingayen Gulf on 6 January 1945, and at Zambales and Subic Bay on the 29th and 31st. In each instance, after completing the pre-invasion sweeps, she helped extend the cleared areas during and after the initial troop landings, and provided antisubmarine and antiaircraft protection for the transports.

On 13 February, her division began pre-invasion sweeps in Manila Bay in preparation for landings at Mariveles and Corregidor. While operating off Corregidor on the 14th, the minesweepers came within 5,000 yards (4,600 m) of the island and were repeatedly straddled by Japanese fire before supporting ships silenced the enemy's guns. Scuffle continued sweeping in Manila Bay through 18 February, and her unit earned a Navy Unit Commendation for the operation. On 24 February, Scuffle re-entered Manila Bay with 15 YMS's to clear the harbor of mines and submerged wrecks. Her force, plus the salvage ship USS Cable (ARS-19), accomplished the task by 10 April, sweeping 615 square miles (1,590 km^{2}) of water and opening the Harbor to supply ships. On 22 April, she rejoined Mine Division 34 in an 8-day sweep of the Sulu Sea off Palawan. On 9 May, the minesweeper arrived at Morotai to prepare for operations in the Netherlands East Indies.

On 2 June, Scuffle sailed from Morotai with her division to carry out a pre-invasion sweep in Brunei Bay. She ran aground on a reef on 6 June, damaging a screw, but was able to carry out her assigned sweeps before sailing, on 12 June, for repairs at Subic Bay. She rejoined her division on 26 June off Balikpapan and provided support to YMS's performing the pre-invasion sweep. She left Balikpapan on 8 July and returned to Subic Bay for a month of overhaul. Scuffle's task group received a Presidential Unit Citation for its service off Balikpapan.

The minesweeper left the Philippines on 6 September and arrived at Sasebo, Japan, on 20 October after weathering three typhoons en route. She helped sweep Japanese minefields in Tsushima Strait and the Ryukyu Islands until sailing from Sasebo for home on 9 December. Arriving at Orange, Texas, on 2 April 1946, she was decommissioned there on 19 June 1946 and placed in reserve. Scuffle received 5 battle stars for her World War II service.

While she remained in reserve, Scuffle was reclassified MSF-298 effective 7 February 1955. She was struck from the Navy list on 1 May 1962 and transferred to Mexico on 1 October 1962.

== Mexican Navy career ==
In October 1962, the former Scuffle was acquired by the Mexican Navy and renamed ARM DM-05. In 1994, she was renamed ARM General Felipe Xicoténcatl (C53). In 1999, she was reportedly sunk off Cozumel, then, in 2000, was stricken from the rolls of the Mexican Navy.

== Underwater Scuba Park and artificial reef ==
After 55 years of service C-53 was decommissioned and later donated to Cozumel underwater park. C-53 was sunk in 1999 in 82' of water just off shore from Chankanaab Park. The C-53 was stabilized and anchored by a series of massive concrete blocks and became home to an abundance of soft corals, sponges and tropical fish. A common inhabitant of the C-53 are the Glassy Sweepers. On October 22, 2005, a Category 5 hurricane named "Wilma", pushed the C-53 from its original position North approximately 100 feet. However the ship remains vertical and is stable for continued diving and exploration. As of this update, the C-53 is home to a wide array of corals, soft corals, sponges and marine life. It is one of the most popular dives of the region among suitably certified divers. Due to its depth, it is not a dive for beginners.
