= USS Sage =

Minesweeper of the United States Navy

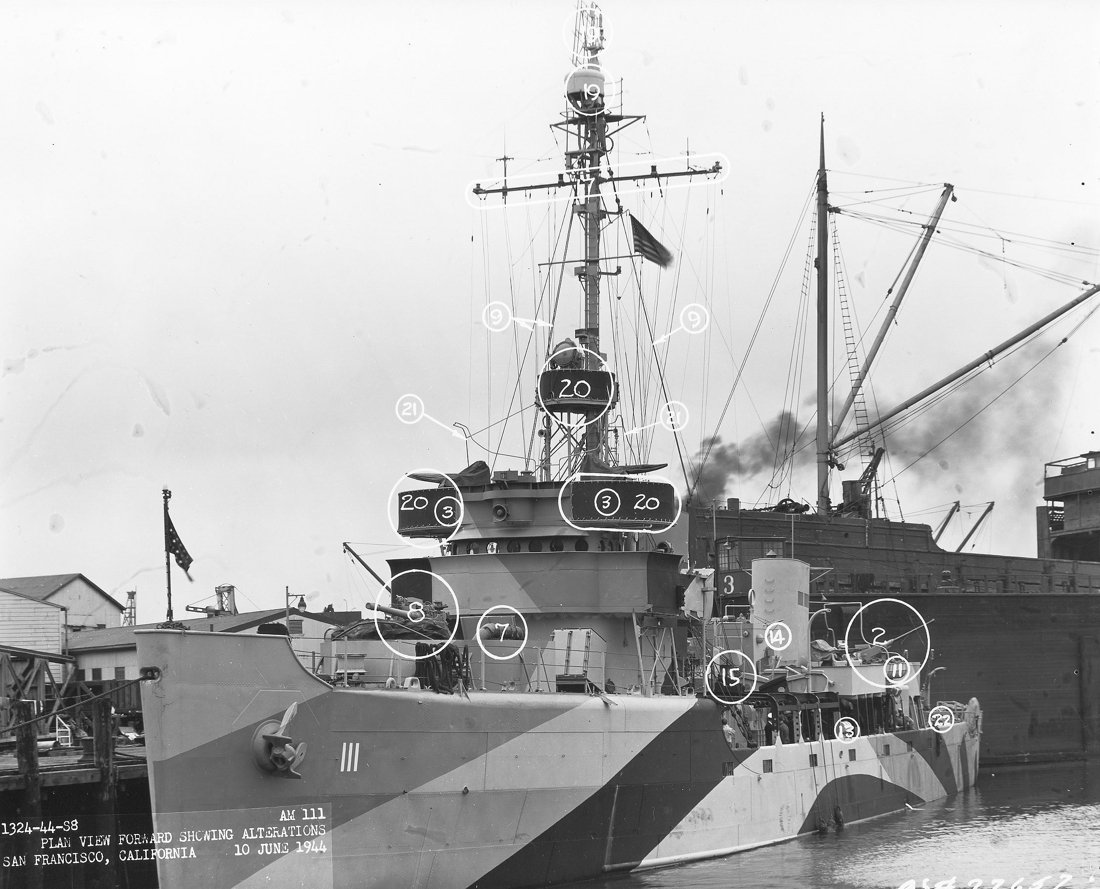
- Sage at Naval Shipyard San Francisco, California on 10 June 1944

History

United States
- Name: USS Sage (AM-111)
- Builder: Winslow Marine Railway and Shipbuilding Company, Winslow, Washington
- Laid down: 29 July 1942
- Launched: 21 November 1942
- Commissioned: 23 August 1943
- Recommissioned: 16 March 1951
- Decommissioned: October 1946; 19 April 1955
- Reclassified: MSF-111, 7 February 1955
- Stricken: 1 July 1972
- Honours and awards: 8 battle stars (World War II)
- Fate: Sold to Mexico, 1973

Mexico
- Name: ARM Hermenegildo Galeana (C86)
- Namesake: Hermenegildo Galeana
- Acquired: 4 November 1973
- Reclassified: G19
- Renamed: ARM Mariano Matamoros (P117), 1993
- Namesake: Mariano Matamoros
- Status: in active service, as of February 2026

General characteristics
- Class & type: Auk-class minesweeper
- Displacement: 890 long tons (904 t)
- Length: 221 ft 3 in (67.44 m)
- Beam: 32 ft (9.8 m)
- Draft: 10 ft 9 in (3.28 m)
- Speed: 18 knots (33 km/h; 21 mph)
- Complement: 100 officers and enlisted
- Armament: 1 × 3"/50 caliber gun; 2 × 40 mm guns; 5 × Depth charge projectors

USS Sage (AM-111) was an Auk-class minesweeper acquired by the United States Navy for the dangerous task of removing naval mines.

Sage was laid down on 29 July 1942 by the Winslow Marine Railway and Shipbuilding Company, Winslow, Washington; launched on 21 November 1942; sponsored by Miss Shirley Woodman; and commissioned on 23 August 1943.

== World War II Pacific operations ==
Following shakedown off the California coast, Sage moved west to Pearl Harbor. Arriving on 20 October, she departed again on the 28th; and proceeded to Midway Island, whence she provided escort services to the Ellice and Phoenix Islands; and then returned to Hawaii. Through December 1943 and into January 1944, she conducted minesweeping exercises and experiments and was altered to carry a small support landing craft. On 22 January, she embarked a hydrographic party; and, on the 23rd, she sortied with Task Force 51, the Marshall Islands assault force.

On the 31st, Sage commenced minesweeping and hydrographic survey operations at Majuro; and, four days later, shifted to Kwajalein. For the next week, she alternated antisubmarine patrols with sonar watch duty at the entrance to the lagoon. On 11 February, she and three other AMs tracked and attacked a possible submarine one mile off Gea, but the depth charges they dropped seemingly inflicted little or no damage. On the 15th, however, she sailed with Task Group 51.11 for Eniwetok; and, the same day, joined the destroyers Phelps (DD-360) and Macdonough (DD-351) in sinking the Japanese submarine RO-40.

Two days later, Sage, with Oracle (AM-103), YMS-262, and YMS-383, was detached from the formation. Proceeding to Wide Pass, they commenced sweeping operations at 0617; and, at 0726, entered the lagoon. An hour and one half later, they sighted personnel on board a beached Japanese ship. After shelling the ship, they resumed sweeping operations and added patrol duties which continued until mid-March.

Reassigned to task force TF 51, Sage departed Eniwetok and returned to Kwajalein, whence her task group moved to occupy the outer islands of the Marshall group: Ailinglapalap, Namu, and others to the southeast; Bikini Atoll, Rongelap, and Utirik to the north.

== Stateside overhaul ==
Escort duty followed these operations and took Sage back to Pearl Harbor, then to San Francisco, California. Arriving on 7 May, she underwent overhaul at Alameda, California; resumed escort duty on 11 June; and, by mid-August, had completed several runs between the Hawaiian and Marshall Islands. The following month, she received more up-to-date radar equipment; and, on 23 September, she departed Hawaii with another westbound convoy. On 3 October, she arrived at Eniwetok; shifted from Task Unit (TU) 31.5.3 to Task Unit TU 31.5.2; and continued to the Admiralties to stage for the invasion at Leyte Gulf.

Sage, with others of her division, MinDiv 13, arrived in Seeadler Harbor, Manus, on 9 October. On the 10th, she sortied with task group TG 77.5 and headed northwest. On the 17th, her division left the formation and, despite high winds, frequent squalls, and reduced visibility, commenced sweeping operations at the entrance to Leyte Gulf. At 0207 on the 20th, the minesweepers began maneuvering to avoid the main body of the assault force as it entered the gulf and, soon after 0630, they resumed mine disposal activities. Two hours later, the invasion was in progress and enemy planes became active.

== Leyte Gulf operations ==
Minesweeping activities continued through the 23rd. On the 24th, intensified enemy air activity opened the multi-phased Battle for Leyte Gulf, and Sage was ordered to make smoke to cover smaller vessels in her area. She then anchored in San Pedro Bay, where she remained through the concluding actions of the battle. On the 27th, she cleared the bay and moved to the site of the Battle off Samar, where, for the next four days, she searched for survivors of the ships sunk during the engagement. Her lookouts sighted only unoccupied life rafts and life rings.

On the evening of the 31st, Sage returned to San Pedro Bay, where she conducted sweeps from 3 to 7 November. She then shifted her operations to an area north of Suluan and, on the 13th, returned to Leyte. On the 19th, she assumed antisubmarine patrol duties between Homonhon and Manicani, where a party from the ship provided the first medical assistance to the inhabitants in over three years.

From the 23rd to the 29th, the AM patrolled off the entrance to Leyte Gulf; then, after a week's rest, departed San Pedro Bay to support operations against Japanese facilities at Ormoc Bay. On 6 December, she moved through Canigao Channel and conducted sweeps in the Camotes Sea. On the 7th, she patrolled off the entrance to Ormoc Bay as the 77th Infantry Division was landed. Then, on the 8th, she returned to San Pedro Bay.

== Operating with the Mindoro Attack Force ==
Four days later, Sage sortied with the Mindoro Attack Force. Enemy air attacks plagued the force as it moved toward the assault area north of Mangarin Bay; but, on the 14th, Sage commenced minesweeping operations off the island and, early on the 15th, moved in toward White Beach to clear the way for the troops assigned to land near the Tubaong River. By mid-morning, she had recovered her gear and assumed covering duties for the smaller minecraft working in closer to the beaches.

Later in the day, as the troops moved off the beaches and secured their objectives, she got underway to return to Leyte, where she prepared for her next invasion, Lingayen Gulf, on Luzon.

On 2 January 1945, Sage departed Leyte Gulf. During the next three days, Japanese aircraft, kamikazes, swarmed over the Sulu Sea in an attempt to stop the Allied attack force. On the 6th, Sage reached her destination; and, at daylight, commenced sweeping in the gulf. Enemy aerial resistance continued and intensified. On the 8th, Sage was detached from sweeping duties and assigned to support YMS operations. On the 9th, troops streamed ashore at Lingayen and San Fabian; and., on the 14th, Sage cleared Lingayen Gulf to escort a convoy back to Leyte.

== Subic Bay operations ==
She departed Leyte for Luzon again on the 25th. Three days later, she was at Mindoro; and, at 0358 on the 29th, she commenced sweeping approaches to landing areas on the southern Zambales coast. Within hours, Operation "Mike VII" had landed troops near San Antonio, San Narciso, and San Felipe to cut off a Japanese retreat into Bataan. In the afternoon, Sage shifted to the entrance of Subic Bay; conducted antisubmarine patrols there until the next morning; then moved into the bay for sweeping missions.

On 4 February, Sage departed Subic Bay; returned briefly to Leyte; then sailed east to Guam; whence she set a course for Ulithi where she staged for Operation Iceberg, the invasion of the Ryukyus. By 20 March, she had left the western Carolines behind and was moving northwest with task group TG 52.4. From the 24th to the 31st, she helped clear the way for the forces approaching Kerama Retto and Okinawa. On 31 March and 1 April, she replenished at Kerama Retto; then, got underway to support the main assault force as it went ashore on Okinawa's Hagushi beaches.

== Patrol assignment ==
On the 3rd, she added patrol operations to her duties; and, on the 7th, she assisted in rescue operations for survivors of ships attacked by kamikazes the 6th. She continued her patrol and sweeping work through the 16th; then gained a brief respite. On the 17th, she replenished at Kerama Retto; and, that evening, resumed patrol duties, continuing them through the 24th. On the 25th, she reported for escort duty and got underway for Saipan.

Sage arrived in the Marianas on 1 May. After stops at Saipan and Guam, she got underway for Ulithi, whence she escorted a reinforcement and resupply convoy to the Ryukyus, where she resumed sweeping operations on 4 July. From then until the 14th, she worked in area "Juneau" in the East China Sea. On the 15th, she put into Buckner Bay; and, from the 17th to the 21st, was at sea on a typhoon evasion course. On the 22nd, she returned to area "Juneau" and remained until the end of the month. On 6 August, she got underway again; escorted a convoy back to Leyte; and remained in San Pedro Bay until after the cessation of hostilities in the Pacific.

At the end of August, Sage departed the Philippines and moved back to the Ryukyus. On 5 September, she moved north, to the Japanese home islands, and began clearing minefields and planting navigational aids in waters off Shikoku. In mid-September, she shifted to Honshū, where she operated primarily as a minesweeper and secondarily as a pilot into December. On 17 December, she departed the Far East.

== Post-War inactivation ==
Ordered to the U.S. East Coast of the United States, Sage transited the Panama Canal in February 1946; and, in early March, she arrived at Charleston, South Carolina, for overhaul. Then immobilized and designated for inactivation, she moved south and west in October and, at mid-month, arrived at Orange, Texas. There inactivation was completed, and she was berthed with the U.S. 6th Fleet (Inactive) in mid-February 1947.

== Recommissioning for East Coast operations ==
In June 1950, war broke out in Korea and created a need for minecraft and trained men to man them. In August, Sage, with others of her type, was ordered activated. Recommissioned on 16 March 1951, she was homeported at Charleston; and, for the next three years, conducted training exercises off the southeastern seaboard, in the Caribbean, and in the Gulf of Mexico. In March 1954, she deployed to the Mediterranean where she operated with the U.S. 6th Fleet through the summer. In October, she resumed operations out of Charleston; and, in December, she was ordered inactivated for a second time.

== Final decommissioning ==
Reclassified MSF-111 on 7 February 1955, Sage departed Charleston ten days later; and, on the 18th, arrived at Green Cove Springs, Florida, where she was decommissioned on 19 April 1955 and shifted to the Orange, Texas, berthing area. She remained in the Reserve Fleet until 1 July 1972 when she was struck from the Navy list. Sage was sold to Mexico on 4 November 1973.

== Awards ==
Sage earned 8 battle stars during World War II.

== Mexican Navy service ==
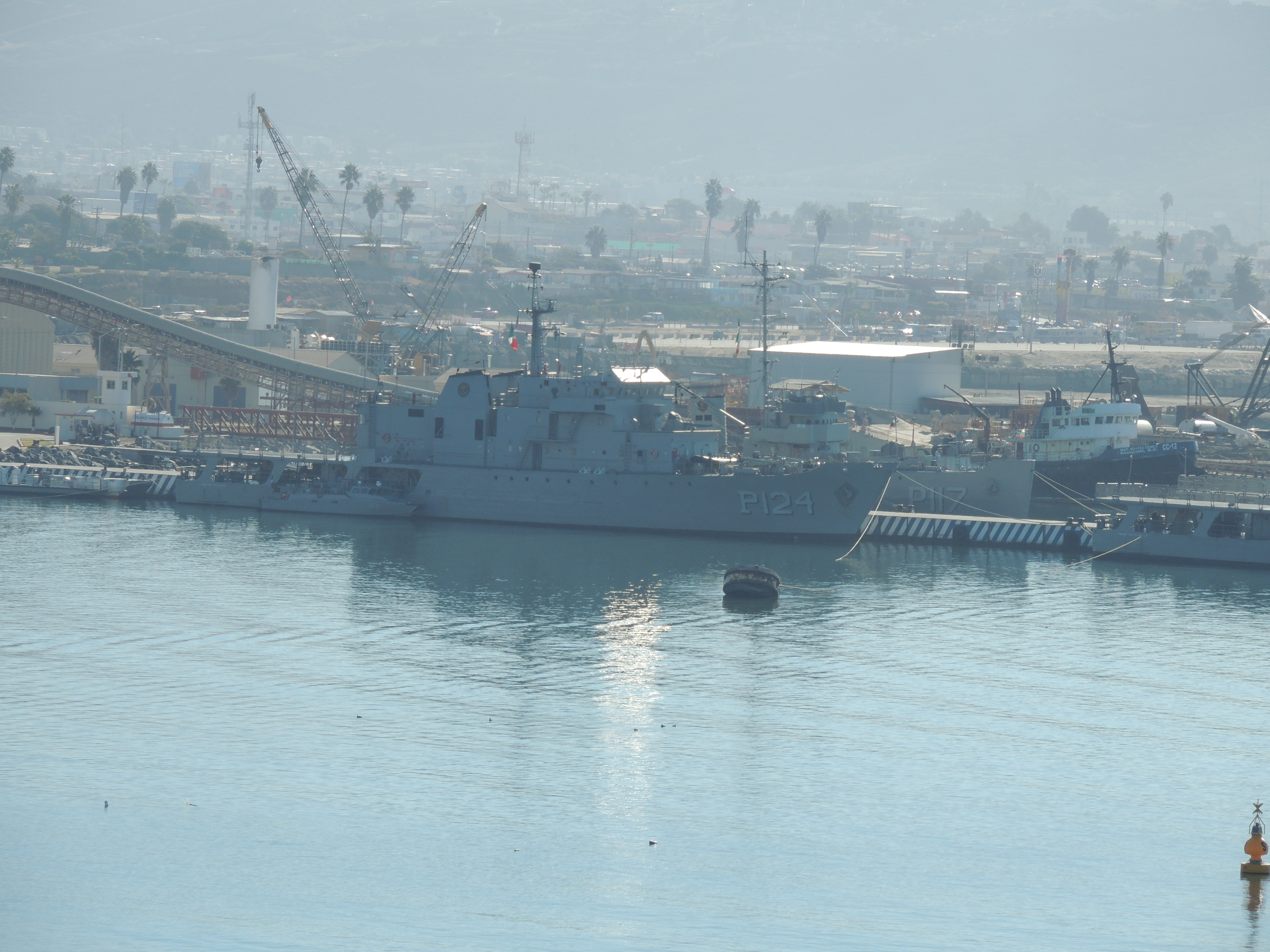
ARM Mariano Matamoros (P117) seen behind ARM Bretón (P124) in 2013.

On 4 November 1973, the former Sage was sold to the Mexican Navy and renamed ARM Hermenegildo Galeana (C86). Later, her pennant number was changed to G19. In 1993, she was renamed ARM Mariano Matomoros (P117) to free her former name for American frigate Bronstein, which was purchased the same year. As of February 2026, Mariano Matomoros was in active service with the Mexican Navy.
