= Eagledale Park =

Coordinates: 47.6096°N 122.5219°W

Eagledale Park is a 7-acre (28,000 m^{2}) park located in the neighborhood of Eagledale on Bainbridge Island in the state of Washington, U.S. Like several other parks on Bainbridge Island, Eagledale Park comprises land that was once a military installation. Today the park features tennis courts, an off-leash dog park, a picnic shelter, a children's play area, a sand volleyball court and a pottery studio.

In the 1950s the site was used as part of the Project Nike anti-aircraft missile system.

The park occupies some of the highest ground on Bainbridge Island. On a clear day, Mount Rainier may be seen from the park.

The park is located on Bainbridge Island at 5055 Rose Avenue N.E.
