= USS Pursuit (AM-108) =

US Navy minesweeper

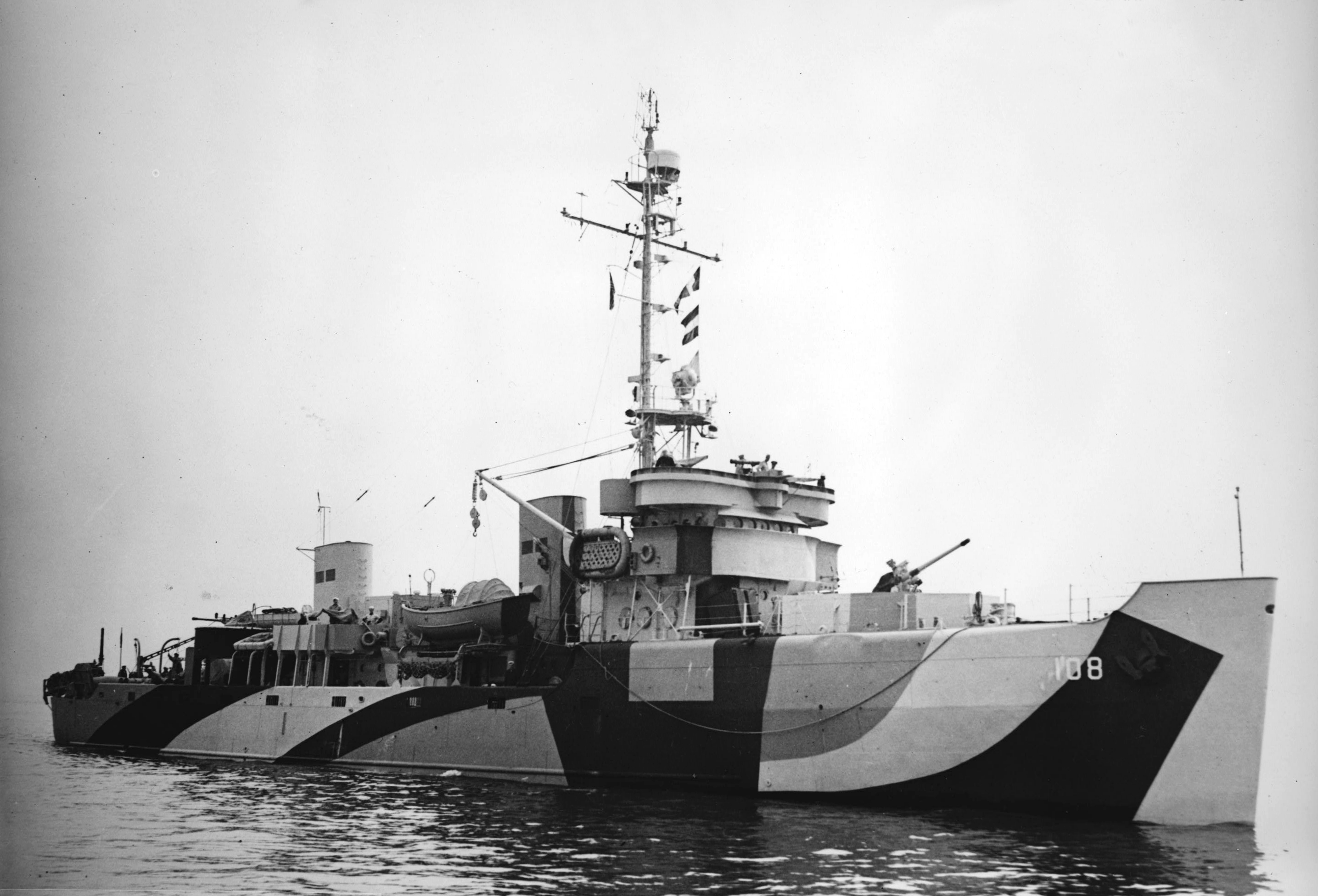

History

United States
- Name: USS Pursuit
- Builder: Winslow Marine Railway and Shipbuilding Company, Winslow, Washington
- Laid down: 12 November 1941
- Launched: 12 June 1942
- Commissioned: 30 April 1943
- Decommissioned: 30 April 1947
- Recommissioned: 15 February 1950
- Decommissioned: 30 June 1960
- Reclassified: AGS–17, August 1951
- Stricken: 1 July 1960
- Honours and awards: 8 battle stars (World War II)

General characteristics
- Class & type: Auk-class minesweeper
- Displacement: 890 long tons (904 t)
- Length: 221 ft 3 in (67.44 m)
- Beam: 32 ft (9.8 m)
- Draft: 10 ft 9 in (3.28 m)
- Speed: 18 knots (33 km/h; 21 mph)
- Complement: 100 officers and enlisted
- Armament: 1 × 3"/50 caliber gun; 2 × 40 mm guns

USS Pursuit (AM-108) was an Auk-class minesweeper acquired by the United States Navy for the dangerous task of removing mines from minefields laid in the water to prevent ships from passing.

Pursuit was laid down by Winslow Marine Railway and Shipbuilding Company, Winslow, Washington, on 12 November 1941; launched on 12 June 1942, sponsored by Miss Carrie Ann Copp; and commissioned on 30 April 1943.

== World War II Pacific operations ==
Following shakedown off the U.S. West Coast, Pursuit escorted a round trip convoy between San Francisco, California and Pearl Harbor before getting underway for the New Hebrides on 25 October. Pursuit was command ship during the invasion of Betio Island (codename: "Helen") in the Tarawa Atoll, Gilbert Islands, before joining Task Force TF 52 for the Kwajalein invasion in which she served as an antisubmarine and minesweeping ship. On 21 March 1944 she returned to San Francisco, California, as a convoy escort. She steamed again for Pearl Harbor on 21 April, to escort convoys to the Marshalls through July. On 4 October she got underway from Eniwetok to Manus, Admiralty Islands, to stage for the invasion of the Philippines. Arriving in Leyte Gulf on 24 October, she conducted minesweeping operations and anti-submarine patrols, and searched for survivors of sunken ships and downed aircraft.

== Lingayen Gulf operations ==
On 6 January 1945 Pursuit reached Lingayen Gulf among the first ships of the invasion force, where she operated until steaming for Leyte Gulf on 14 January. Back off Luzon on 28 January she swept off the San Felipe and San Antonio invasion beaches then on the 29th swept in Subic Bay. After completing this operation she proceeded to Guam and Ulithi on 4 February to prepare for the invasion of Okinawa.

== Okinawa Invasion operations ==
Arriving at Okinawa on 24 March with Task Group TG 52.3, she commenced sweeping operations until the 31st, then took her part in an inner anti-submarine screen for the landing forces at Hagushi Beaches. On 6 April Pursuit shot down one suicide plane and assisted in shooting down several others, sailing on 27 May for Portland, Oregon.

== Post War decommissioning ==
After the cessation of hostilities, Pursuit got underway for the east coast. Arriving Norfolk, Virginia 5 January 1946, from 28 April to 5 September she served as a target ship for torpedo bombing practice off the Florida coast until ordered to Orange, Texas for inactivation. She arrived there on 7 November, and was decommissioned on 30 April 1947.

== Recommissioned as survey ship ==
Recommissioned 15 February 1950, Pursuit left Texas and proceeded off Labrador and Greenland as part of Hydrographic Survey Group 2. For the next three years she spent the winter survey season operating in the Caribbean, and the summer months in the northern latitudes off Labrador and Greenland. Reclassified AGS–17, 15 August 1951, Pursuit continued that employment schedule until mid-1954 when she set course for İskenderun, Turkey, 6 October, returning to Norfolk, Virginia, 23 March 1955. On 15 July she was underway for a survey and resupply mission along the Arctic "DEW Line". Having sounded previously uncharted waters both above and below the Arctic Circle, she returned to the east coast, at New York, 10 October.

During 1956, 1957, and 1958 Pursuit again conducted hydrographic and oceanographic surveys off the coast of Turkey. On her return she resumed surveys in the Caribbean. Reassigned to the Pacific in 1960, Pursuit departed New York on 15 February for Pearl Harbor, arriving 14 April. She operated in Hawaiian waters until May when she sailed for Long Beach, California.

== Final decommissioning ==
Mooring there 9 May, she began inactivation and decommissioned 30 June 1960. Her name was struck from the Navy List on 1 July 1960.

== Awards ==
Pursuit earned 8 battle stars for World War II service.
