= USS Salute (AM-294) =

Minesweeper of the United States Navy

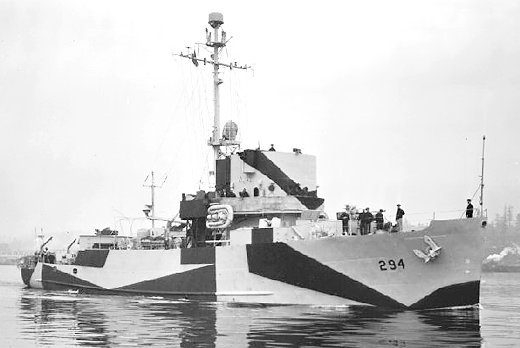

History

United States
- Name: USS Salute
- Builder: Winslow Marine Railway and Shipbuilding Company
- Laid down: 11 November 1942
- Launched: 6 February 1943
- Commissioned: 4 December 1943
- Stricken: 11 July 1945
- Fate: Struck a mine off Brunei and sank, 8 June 1945

General characteristics
- Class & type: Admirable-class minesweeper
- Displacement: 795 tons
- Length: 184 ft 6 in (56.24 m)
- Beam: 33 ft (10 m)
- Draft: 9 ft 9 in (2.97 m)
- Propulsion: 2 × ALCO 539 diesel engines, 1,710 shp (1.3 MW); Farrel-Birmingham single reduction gear; 2 shafts
- Speed: 15 knots (27.8 km/h)
- Complement: 104
- Armament: 1 × 3"/50 caliber gun; 1 × twin Bofors 40 mm guns; 6 × Oerlikon 20 mm cannons; 1 × Hedgehog anti-submarine mortar; 4 × Depth charge projectors (K-guns); 2 × Depth charge tracks

Service record
- Part of: US Pacific Fleet (1943–1945)
- Operations: Philippines campaign (1944–45)
- Awards: 5 Battle stars

USS Salute (AM-294) was a U.S. Navy oceangoing minesweeper, laid down on 11 November 1942 by Winslow Marine Railway and Shipbuilding Co., Seattle, Washington; launched on 6 February 1943; sponsored by Miss Patricia Lindgren; and commissioned on 4 December 1943.

== World War II Pacific Theatre operations ==
After shakedown, Salute sailed from San Francisco on 21 March 1944 for Hawaii. Between April and September 1944, she escorted convoys between Pearl Harbor, Majuro, Kwajalein, Eniwetok, Guam, and Saipan, before reporting to the 7th Fleet at Manus on 8 October for the Leyte invasion. On 20 October, she joined her division, Mine Division 34, off the Leyte beaches for a four-day sweep of the main transport channel, and then anchored with the transports to provide antiaircraft support. Between 27 and 31 October, she helped search for survivors at the scene of the Battle off Samar, where a group of escort carriers, destroyers, and destroyer escorts, had repulsed the attack of a more powerful Japanese fleet. For the next month, she carried out local patrols and sweeps in the vicinity of Leyte.

Salute participated with her division in most of the subsequent landings in the Philippines. She carried out pre-invasion sweeps at Ormoc Bay on 6 December, Mindoro Island on 14 December, Lingayen Gulf on 6 January 1945, and Zambales and Subic Bay on 29 and 31 January. During and after the initial troop landings, she helped extend the mineswept areas and provided antisubmarine and antiaircraft protection for the transports anchored off the beaches. Few mines were encountered, but kamikaze resistance was intense, and the ships saw much antiaircraft action.

On 13 February, Salute and her division began pre-invasion sweeps in Manila Bay in preparation for the landings at Mariveles and Corregidor. While sweeping off Corregidor on the 14th, the minesweepers came within 5,000 yards of the island and were repeatedly straddled by Japanese fire before supporting ships silenced the island's guns. Salute continued sweeping in Manila Bay through 18 February, and her division earned a Navy Unit Commendation for the operation.

During the next two and one-half months, Salute carried out several local sweeps in support of ground operations in the Philippines, the most notable being a pre-assault sweep for the landings at Legaspi, Luzon, on 1 April, and an 8-day sweep in the Sulu Sea off Palawan beginning on 22 April. On 9 May, the ship arrived at Morotai to prepare for operations in the Netherlands East Indies.

== Sinking ==
With Mine Division 34, Salute began the pre-invasion sweep for the landings in Brunei Bay, Borneo, on 7 June 1945. The next day, she struck a mine, buckled amidships, and both bow and stern began to sink. Two landing craft attempted to salvage the minesweeper, but they were unable to control her flooding, and the ship sank, with 6 deaths and 3 sailors reported as missing, for a total of 9 lost. Salute was struck from the Navy list on 11 July 1945.

She now lies at 5°8′N 115°5′E in 30 meters of water, broken in two pieces, one lying across the other. It is a popular and challenging dive site with a lot of munitions both on and nearby the wreck. The Malaysian navy recently removed her unexploded depth charges.

== Awards ==
USS Salute received five battle stars for her World War II service.

== Artifact recovery ==
On 14 November 2016, a memorial plaque was presented to the US Embassy in Brunei which contains a folded American flag, a picture of USS Salute in service and the names of the nine sailors who perished in the explosion.

On 18 November 2016, the United States Navy's Naval History and Heritage Command (NHHC) announced that they had reclaimed four artifacts - an ink well, a gas mask, and two plates from divers who had removed them from the wreck. The items will be conserved if possible.

== See also ==
- List of Admirable class minesweepers
