= Winslow Marine Railway and Shipbuilding Company =

American shipyard (1903 to 1959)

Coordinates: 47°37′20″N 122°30′49″W

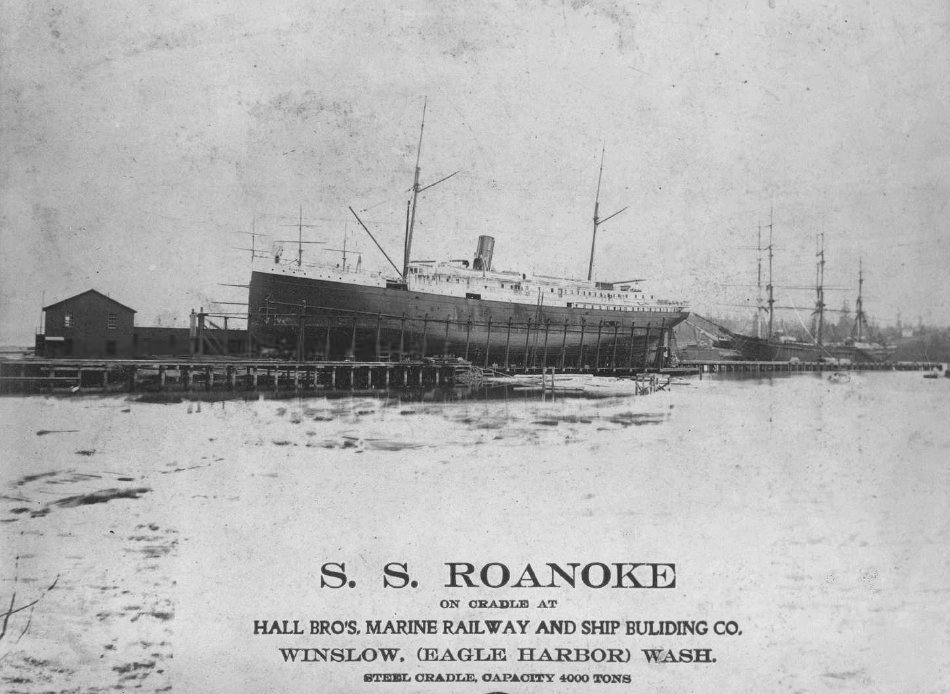
SS Roanoke on cradle for repair or refit at Winslow Marine Railway and Shipbuilding Company's Eagle Harbor yard between 1906 and 1916.

Winslow Marine Railway and Shipbuilding Company was a Puget Sound shipbuilder that operated from 1878 until 1959 on Bainbridge Island, Washington, United States. Founded as the Hall Brothers Marine Railway and Shipbuilding Company, it moved in 1903 from its original shipyard in Port Blakely to a new yard in Winslow. It was sold and renamed in 1915, and again in 1948, as Commercial Ship Repair of Winslow.

== History ==
In 1878, brothers Henry, Isaac, and Winslow Hall founded the Hall Brothers Marine Railway and Shipbuilding Company in Port Blakely, Washington. Among the ships built there were A.N. Campbell, a schooner built around 1897; Alpena, a schooner; and Caroline, a four-masted schooner built for Joseph Knowland.

By the early 1900s, the company had outgrown its yard, hemmed in by steep hills running to the Port Blakely beach. In the early 1900s, the company obtained 77 acres (310,000 m^{2}) on Eagle Harbor near the village of Madrone. (The village would be renamed Winslow by Henry Hall, the last surviving brother.)

Construction of the new yard required the removal of nearly 5,000 cubic yards of dirt; the harbor was dredged as well. Opened for operations in May 1903, the yard included a marine railway, a powerhouse, sawmill, joiner loft, warehouse, and shipways. A specialty was five-masted schooners whose design allowed cargo to be loaded fore and aft. In 1915, hull number 446 was an oil tank steel screw steamer for the Standard Oil Company of New Jersey to be built by Harlan and Hollingsworth of Wilmington, Delaware.

In 1916, Hall sold the Winslow yard to James Griffiths, who renamed it Winslow Marine Railway & Shipbuilding Co. The following year, Griffiths leased the yard to D.W. Hartzel, Inc., which used the facility to install machinery in hulls built at other yards.

After World War I, Griffiths retook control of the yard, using it to do repair work for Puget Sound's ferry operators. During World War II, the yard built steel minesweepers for the United States Navy, employing as many as 2,300 workers. From June 1942 to October 1944, the yard launched 17 minesweepers, or one every other month.

Among those ships were:

- 4 of 95 Auk-class minesweepers (ca. 1943)
  - Pursuit (AM-108) ... Sage (AM-111)
- 16 of 123 Admirable-class minesweepers (ca. 1944)
  - Garland (AM-238) ... Impervious (AM-245)
  - Salute (AM-294) ... Shelter (AM-301)
- Yard tugs YTL-571 to YTL-574

James Griffiths & Sons, Inc., sold the yard in 1948, and its new owners renamed it Commercial Ship Repair of Winslow. Business dwindled, and the yard closed in 1959. The property was divided into a marina, an apartment complex, and a Washington State Ferries maintenance facility.

Some records from the Hall Brothers era are held at the San Francisco Maritime National Historical Park in San Francisco.

Among the Admirable minesweepers was USS Inaugural (AM-242), which saw combat during World War II and then served as a museum ship in St. Louis, Missouri, from 1968 to 1993.

== See also ==
- Seattle-Tacoma Shipbuilding Corporation#Shipbuilding in Puget Sound
- James Griffiths & Sons, Inc.
