= Winslow, Bainbridge Island, Washington =

Coordinates: 47°37′34″N 122°31′16″W

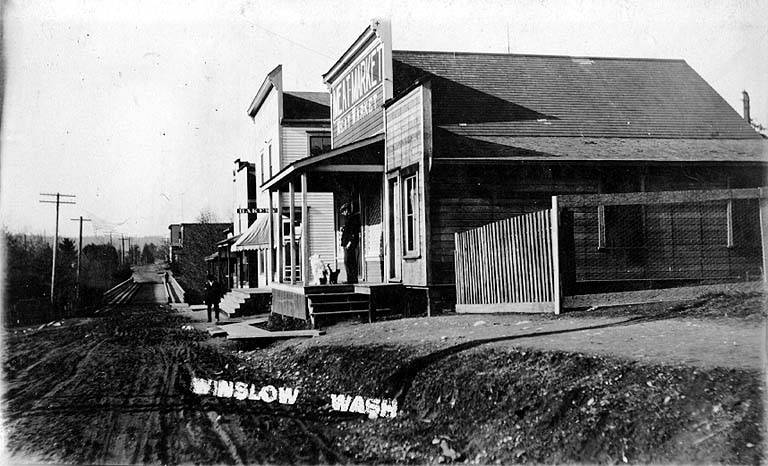
1916 picture of Winslow

Winslow is the name of the downtown area of the city of Bainbridge Island, Washington, and is the original name of the city, named for shipbuilder Winslow Hall. It encompasses the area around the main street, Winslow Way, and is made up of about 1.5 square miles (3.9 km^{2}) overlooking Eagle Harbor.

The city has occupied the entire space of Bainbridge Island since February 28, 1991, when the 1.5-square-mile (3.9 km^{2}) city of Winslow (incorporated on August 9, 1947), annexed the rest of the island after a narrowly passed November 1990 referendum. It officially remained the city of Winslow for several months, until November 7, 1991, at which time the city of Winslow was renamed the city of Bainbridge Island.

Winslow Way runs about ten city blocks, and is grounded on both sides by local businesses, including a bookstore, several galleries, and multiple restaurants and bakeries. A ferry terminal, with service to Seattle's Colman Dock, boards at the east end of Winslow Way.

In 2010, the census block group in which Winslow is located had a median household income of $42,000, less than half of the Island's median household income of $94,000 and one-third of several of the Island's wealthiest block groups, and also $10,000 less than national and statewide averages. More than half of Winslow households live in rental units, compared to 20% of households across the Island. These differences have in some cases created tension between Winslow and the remainder of the Island, which were highlighted during the successful initiative to annex Winslow and the remainder of the Island into a new jurisdiction noted above.

== See also ==
- Pacific Creosoting Company
- List of Bainbridge Island communities
