= USS Benjamin Stoddert =

Charles F. Adams-class destroyer

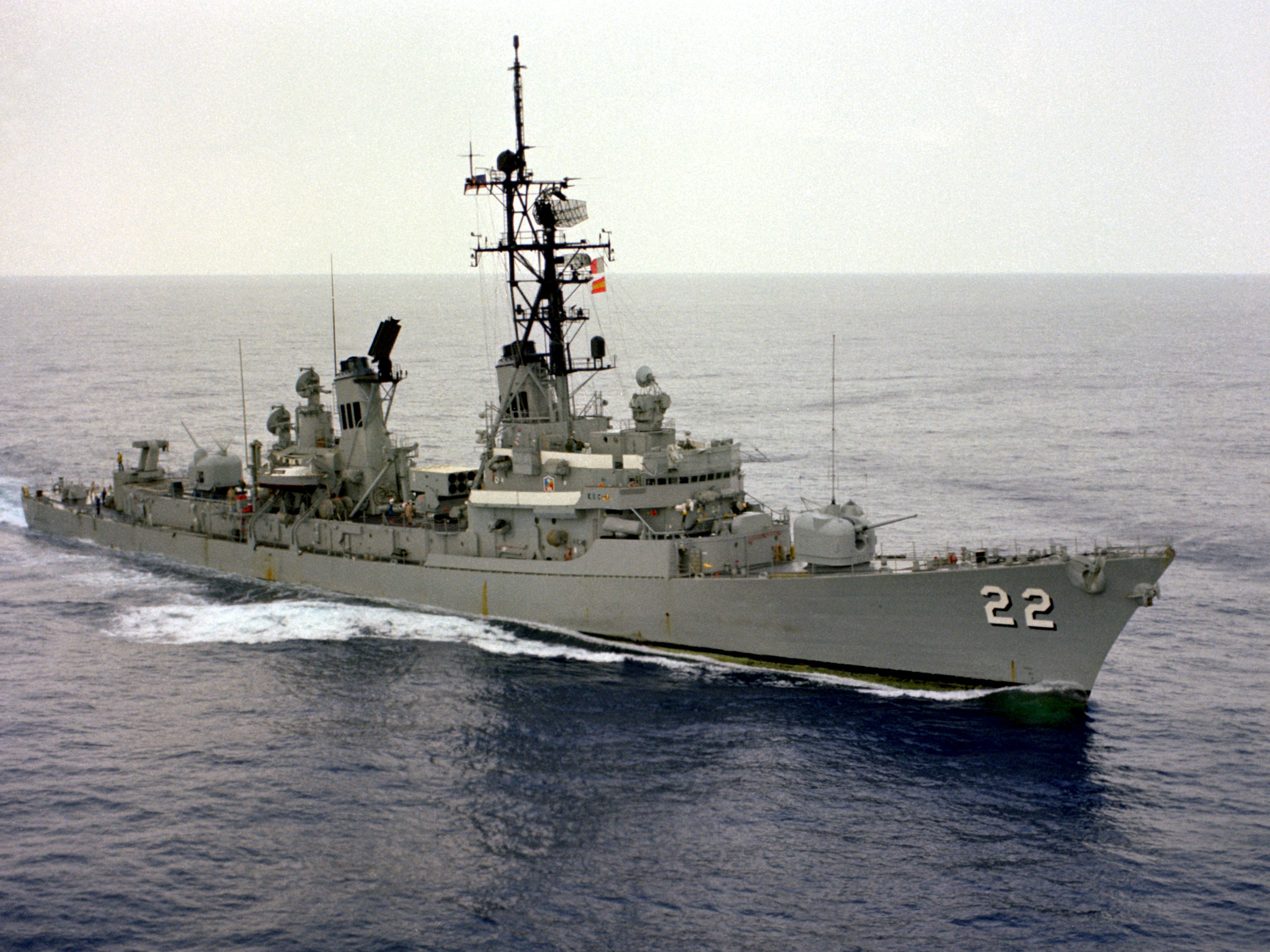
- Benjamin Stoddert underway, 1 February 1979

History

United States
- Name: Benjamin Stoddert
- Namesake: Benjamin Stoddert
- Ordered: 25 March 1960
- Builder: Puget Sound Bridge and Dry Dock Company
- Laid down: 11 June 1962
- Launched: 8 January 1963
- Commissioned: 12 September 1964
- Decommissioned: 20 December 1991
- Stricken: 20 November 1992
- Identification: Callsign: NHMC; Hull number: DDG-22
- Motto: Post umbra lux; (After darkness, light); Denique decus; (Honour at length)
- Fate: Sank while under tow, 3 February 2001

General characteristics
- Class & type: Charles F. Adams-class destroyer
- Displacement: 3,277 tons standard, 4,526 full load
- Length: 437 ft (133 m)
- Beam: 47 ft (14 m)
- Draft: 15 ft (4.6 m)
- Propulsion: 2 × General Electric steam turbines providing 70,000 shp (52 MW); 2 shafts; 4 × Babcock & Wilcox 1,275 psi (8,790 kPa) boilers
- Speed: 33 knots (61 km/h; 38 mph)
- Range: 4,500 nautical miles (8,300 km) at 20 knots (37 km/h)
- Complement: 354 (24 officers, 330 enlisted)
- Sensors & processing systems: AN/SPS-39 3D air search radar; AN/SPS-10 surface search radar; AN/SPG-51 missile fire control radar; AN/SPG-53 gunfire control radar; AN/SQS-23 Sonar and the hull mounted SQQ-23 Pair Sonar for DDG-2 through 19; AN/SPS-40 Air Search Radar
- Armament: 1 Mk 11 missile launcher (DDG2-14) or Mk 13 single arm missile launcher (DDG-15-24) for RIM-24 Tartar SAM system, or later the RIM-66 Standard (SM-1) and Harpoon antiship missile; 2 × 5"/54 caliber Mark 42 (127 mm) gun; 1 × RUR-5 ASROC Launcher; 6 × 12.8 in (324 mm) ASW Torpedo Tubes (2 × Mark 32 Surface Vessel Torpedo Tubes)

USS Benjamin Stoddert (DDG-22), named for Benjamin Stoddert (1751–1813), Secretary of the Navy from 1798 to 1801, was a Charles F. Adams-class guided missile armed destroyer in the United States Navy.

== Construction and career ==
She was laid down by the Puget Sound Bridge and Dry Dock Company at Seattle, Washington on 11 June 1962, launched on 8 January 1963 and commissioned at the Puget Sound Naval Shipyard on 12 September 1964.

== 1960s ==
Over the next six weeks, Benjamin Stoddert fitted out at the Puget Sound Naval Shipyard, preparing for a series of weapon, sensor, and communication system tests. The guided-missile destroyer departed Bremerton for the first time on 7 November and, after brief stops at San Francisco and San Diego, arrived at Pearl Harbor to commence acceptance trials.

Since she was primarily designed to provide long-range antiaircraft cover for task forces at sea, Benjamin Stoddert conducted a two-month evaluation of her TARTAR antiaircraft missile system, concluding with a test firing off Kauai, Hawaii, in early February 1965. Other tests – including gunnery, torpedo, and engineering exercises – helped the crew tie her antisubmarine, antiair, and communications gear into a single integrated system. In May, the warship entered the Pearl Harbor Naval Shipyard for a two-month maintenance period. In July, Benjamin Stoddert's crew took her through shakedown training, carrying out a variety of operational evolutions – from the complex tracking of aircraft and submarines, to underway refueling, down through the simple but important tasks of anchoring ship – under the watchful eyes of the Fleet Training Group, Pearl Harbor. Upon completing these exams, the warship officially joined the Pacific Fleet in August 1965.

Assigned to Destroyer Division (DesDiv) 112, Benjamin Stoddert conducted local operations in Hawaiian waters through October, when she began preparations for her first tour of duty with 7th Fleet in the western Pacific. Underway with Hancock (CV-19) in late November, she made a brief stop at Subic Bay in the Philippines before proceeding to the South China Sea for combat operations off Vietnam.

Upon arrival at "Yankee Station" on 16 December, Benjamin Stoddert joined Task Force (TF) 77 in support of Operation Rolling Thunder. This naval air campaign, begun the previous March, was intended to interdict North Vietnam's logistical pipeline through Laos and across the demilitarized zone (DMZ), cutting the flow of munitions and supplies to the Viet Cong in South Vietnam. The surface Navy's companion campaign – Operation Sea Dragon – supported this effort by targeting communist supply craft, shelling coastal batteries and radar sites, and bombarding coastal infiltration routes. Over the next six weeks, the guided-missile destroyer screened Hancock – providing antisubmarine and antiair protection for the carrier and carrying out planeguard services during flight operations. She also performed radar control duties to assist strike and combat air patrol (CAP) aircraft returning to the carrier. On 4 and 5 January 1966, in a change of pace from earlier tasks, the guided-missile destroyer also fired her 5-inch guns against Viet Cong targets ashore.

Released from TF 77 on 22 January 1966, Benjamin Stoddert proceeded north, arriving at Yokosuka, Japan, on the 28th. The warship spent a week of alongside Isle Royale (AD-29) to repair a broken steam blower before departing Japan on 6 February to return to the South China Sea. Six days later, the guided-missile destroyer resumed duty in TF 77 screening Hancock and remained so employed until setting out for the Philippines on 5 March. Benjamin Stoddert arrived at Subic Bay on the 7th for a five-day upkeep period alongside Ajax (AR-6). She then sailed to Hong Kong on 12 March for six days of rest and recreation. The warship returned to the South China Sea and rejoined TF 77 late that month. During the next two weeks, the guided-missile destroyer conducted radar picket duty in the Gulf of Tonkin before being relieved by Topeka (CLG-8). Steaming to Subic Bay on the 12th, she then began preparing for a visit to Australia and New Zealand.

Departing Subic Bay on 17 April, Benjamin Stoddert crossed the equator north of the Admiralty Islands and moored at Sydney, Australia, on 29 April. During the next three weeks her crew took part in the annual "Coral Sea Celebration" – in honor of the May 1942 Allied naval victory – and visited Sydney, Brisbane, and Melbourne in Australia as well as Wellington, New Zealand. Underway for Hawaii on 22 May, the guided-missile destroyer arrived at Pearl Harbor, via Suva in the Fiji Islands, on 30 May.

Except for a brief trip to Honolulu, Benjamin Stoddert remained in port until 16 July when she put to sea to participate in the Gemini 10 capsule recovery operation. Then, from 25 July to 5 August, the warship conducted several antisubmarine exercises in Hawaiian waters. She returned to mid-ocean operations on 16 August to participate in the recovery of an unmanned Apollo capsule. After a fuel stop at Kwajalein in the Marshalls on the 27th, the guided-missile destroyer returned to Pearl Harbor on 2 September. In addition to a limited availability alongside Prairie (AD-15), the warship divided the remainder of the year between various service inspections and local operations out of Pearl Harbor.

These local operations – which included shore bombardment, carrier screening, and ASW exercises – continued into early 1967 as the crew prepared for another 7th Fleet deployment. During this time, her engineers and technicians busied themselves maintaining and improving the warship's complex electronic and fire-control systems, a task abetted by a two-week availability alongside Frontier (AD-25) in mid-February.

After a final hull cleaning at Pearl Harbor in late March, Benjamin Stoddert got underway for the Far East on 6 April. The guided-missile destroyer crossed the central Pacific; and, after a short liberty at Yokosuka, Japan, the crew took the warship south to Subic Bay, arriving there on 23 April. Underway the following day, Benjamin Stoddert met Bon Homme Richard (CVA-31) in the Gulf of Tonkin on the 27th. Later that same day, she joined Saint Paul (CA-73) and Ault (DD-698) for a "Sea Dragon" patrol; and the task unit prowled the North Vietnamese coast at the 19th parallel, searching for enemy waterborne logistics craft. Early on 5 May, the warships found two such craft, sinking one with gunfire and damaging the other. That afternoon, the trio carried out a preplanned bombardment mission off North Vietnam. This pattern – small-craft searches in the morning followed by shore bombardment missions later in the day – became the daily routine of Benjamin Stoddert's later "Sea Dragon" patrols.

Following a diversion to Subic Bay on 7 May to fix a broken forced-draft blower, the guided-missile destroyer rejoined Bon Homme Richard on 16 May for 10 days of planeguard duty. Steaming on her second "Sea Dragon" patrol on 26 May, Benjamin Stoddert came under enemy fire for the first time later that day. A North Vietnamese coastal battery unexpectedly opened fire, forcing her to shift fire onto the battery, to commence weaving, and to clear the area. During this patrol, Benjamin Stoddert also rescued the pilot who parachuted from a stricken Air Force F4C "Phantom" that crashed at sea on 30 May (the WSO was rescued by the USS Blue (DD-744)) and provided gunfire protection during the helicopter rescue of an Air Force F-105 "Thunderchief" pilot on 4 June. Returning to Bon Homme Richard the next day, the guided-missile destroyer alternated planeguard duties with "Sea Dragon" patrols through 12 July. At one point on 26 June, enemy counterbattery fire fell close enough to spray the ship with shell fragments, but the resulting damage was light and was quickly repaired. Next came a week of PIRAZ duty followed by four days of gunline operations, after which Benjamin Stoddert headed to Hong Kong for a week of rest and recreation. After an upkeep period at Subic Bay, the guided-missile destroyer returned to "Yankee Station" on 9 August. Once again, she alternated between carrier planeguard services and gunline duties through the end of the month. A boiler tube failure on 4 September, however, forced the warship to proceed to Yokosuka for temporary repairs.

Departing Japan on 21 August, she arrived at Pearl Harbor on 29 August, and spent the remainder of the year undergoing boiler repairs, conducting post-deployment maintenance, and preparing for various service inspections. This routine was broken only by a few days of underway combat training with Jenkins (DD-447) and Pickerel (SS-524) in mid-December. On 20 December, the guided-missile destroyer fired two Tartar missiles at the hulk of the former Fessenden (DE-142) about 50 miles (80 km) south of Oahu. The old escort was damaged by one missile shot and was later sunk by combined gun and torpedo fire. It was during these exercises that the crew learned that Benjamin Stoddert had earned a meritorious unit commendation for the previous summer's combat operations in Southeast Asia.

The guided-missile destroyer continued local operations out of Hawaii until 5 March 1968 when she moved into the Pearl Harbor Naval Shipyard to begin a maintenance overhaul. Upon completion of these repairs on 29 August, the warship conducted four weeks of weapons system and sensor calibration tests. Departing Pearl Harbor on 1 October, Benjamin Stoddert steamed to San Diego, mooring there on the 7th. The next day, the warship began two weeks of training operations in the waters off southern California. Following a missile-firing exercise on the 24th, she put into Redwood City, California, for a port visit on 25 October. After departing there on the 29th, the warship returned home to Pearl Harbor on 2 November and spent the remainder of the year in port.

As part of her final post-overhaul refresher training, Benjamin Stoddert stood out of Pearl Harbor on 13 January 1969 for local operations with Enterprise (CVAN-65) and Rogers (DD-876). Early the next day, while she operated about nine miles (14 km) away, Benjamin Stoddert's crew saw a plume of black smoke rise from the carrier. The guided-missile destroyer closed the smoking carrier – which had suffered a severe flight deck fire – to assist firefighting efforts and search for survivors. By late afternoon, she had recovered one body from the sea and set course for Pearl Harbor.

On 20 January, the guided-missile destroyer began tactical exercises in preparation for "STRIKEX 1-69," a fleet exercise to be held the following month. Underway from Pearl Harbor on 10 February, Benjamin Stoddert conducted two weeks of screening, antiair warfare, gunnery, and antisubmarine exercises off San Diego. After these successful maneuvers, she loaded 10 Standard and 24 Tartar missiles at the ammunition depot at Concord, Calif., and returned to Hawaii. There, she moored alongside Isle Royal (AD-29) in Pearl Harbor for three weeks of boiler tube repairs in preparation for another western Pacific deployment.

On 14 April, Benjamin Stoddert loaded a final pallet of 5-inch ammunition before steaming northwest toward Yokosuka. One day after a brief fuel stop at Midway Island, however, the warship suffered yet another boiler tube failure. This did not prevent regular operations; however, and the guided-missile destroyer arrived in Japan on the 24th. The next day, after North Korean fighters shot down a Navy EC-121 reconnaissance plane over the Sea of Japan, Benjamin Stoddert put to sea for emergency operations in the Yellow Sea. During the tense days that followed, the warship's duties included antiair early warning, carrier screening, and electronic intelligence gathering to pinpoint radar and other installations in the Shandong province of eastern China.

When the crisis abated in mid-May, Benjamin Stoddert turned south, visiting Singapore and spending a day on "Yankee Station," before mooring at Subic Bay on 1 June. Fitted out with specialized reconnaissance equipment, the warship steamed to the Sea of Japan and relieved Dale (DLG-19) as Pacific Area Reconnaissance Program (PARPRO) picket ship on 4 June. The guided-missile destroyer, aside from a few upkeep periods at Sasebo, collected intelligence off the Korean peninsula for the next eight weeks. She moored at Yokosuka on 8 August, unloaded the PARPRO equipment, and then set off south for combat operations on the 10th. After a week of liberty in Hong Kong, Benjamin Stoddert reported to the gunline off South Vietnam on 22 August. There, she carried out fire missions in the Chu Lai area during the day and provided harassment and interdiction fire from Danang harbor during the night. During four weeks of operations, air and ground spotters directed her guns at enemy supply points, troop concentrations, rocket sites, and infiltration routes; and, by mid-September, she had fired over 5,000 5-inch rounds at these and other targets. To guard against enemy underwater swimmer attacks while at anchor in Danang harbor, Benjamin Stoddert's crew assisted her marine sentries by frequently dropping concussion grenades in the water.

Departing Danang on the 18th, the warship steamed to Yokosuka for a second PARPRO cruise in the Sea of Japan. These duties included the difficult task of marshaling, routing, and refueling aircraft during large-scale intelligence gathering missions near North Korea. Relieved by Halsey (DLG-23) in mid-October, Benjamin Stoddert unloaded her PARPRO equipment and sailed for Pearl Harbor on 19 October. During the transit, however, a typhoon moved across her track, forcing the warship to reverse course; and she did not arrive in Pearl Harbor until 1 November.

== 1970s ==
The guided-missile destroyer remained in port until 12 January 1970, when she got underway for a three-day exercise at the Barking Sands Tactical Underwater Range (BARSTUR). The warship conducted a second such training mission between 9 and 13 February, firing exercise RUR-5 ASROC rockets and torpedoes at underwater targets both times. In addition to putting to sea for routine training, she also did so to serve as standby ship for the Apollo 13 recovery mission. In May, Benjamin Stoddert conducted a very successful nuclear submarine detection and tracking exercise with Epperson (DD-719), Knox (DE-1052), and Sargo (SSN-583). At the end of a short availability alongside Bryce Canyon (AD-36), the guided-missile destroyer passed her pre-deployment inspections in early June before joining the annual summer antisubmarine warfare exercise – conducted by American, Canadian, New Zealand, and Japanese warships – off Pearl Harbor at the end of the month. She followed up this exercise with a final tender availability in mid-July.

On 1 August, Benjamin Stoddert sailed for the western Pacific in company with Goldsborough (DDG-20); and, after stopping for fuel at Midway and Guam, the two warships arrived in Subic Bay on the 15th. Stoddert then moved on to "Yankee Station" where she provided planeguard and screen services for Bon Homme Richard between 22 and 30 August. The guided-missile destroyer then headed south for Indonesia, held "a rousing shellback initiation" when she crossed the Equator on 3 September and entered Surabaya harbor for a goodwill visit on the 4th. Departing Java on 7 September, Benjamin Stoddert traced a northerly course between Borneo and Celebes and arrived back at Subic Bay on the 11th.

Following a short upkeep period, the guided-missile destroyer headed for Danang and a tour on the northern search and rescue station (SAR) in the Gulf of Tonkin. Relieving USS Bainbridge (DLGN-25) on 17 September, Benjamin Stoddert provided continuous radar and communications services for barrier combat air patrol (BARCAP) operations over the next 25 days. She then headed to Kaohsiung, Taiwan, where her crew received four days of liberty. Over the next five weeks, Stoddert conducted two more patrols on the north SAR station, the second of which was interrupted by a small fire in the forward fireroom. Although damage was minimal, the warship sailed to Sasebo, Japan, for minor repairs alongside Hector (AR-7). To make matters worse, she suffered another setback when a boiler pipe cracked on the return voyage, and she diverted to Subic Bay for repairs.

The warship finally returned to South Vietnam on the 13th, when she stood to on the gunline off Chu Lai. Once there, the warship settled into a pattern of sporadic call-fire missions during the day and night harassment and interdiction fire after dark. Over the next two weeks, her gun crews fired 2,200 rounds at targets ashore. Sailing for Hong Kong on 29 December, Benjamin Stoddert's crew closed the year with liberty in that city. Underway again on 5 January 1971, the guided-missile destroyer commenced a final three days of lifeguard duty on "Yankee Station" before sailing for home on the 15th. After stops at Taiwan, Guam, and Midway, she finally returned to Pearl Harbor on 5 February.

Following preparations for a second shipyard overhaul – during which time Benjamin Stoddert was reassigned to Destroyer Squadron (DesRon) 33 – she entered the Pearl Harbor Naval Shipyard on 17 May. The warship received improvements to her missile and gun systems, and much-needed repairs to her hull, sonar dome, and engineering spaces. With shipyard work completed on 17 September, the crew began refresher training on 13 October. In the evening of 29 October, however, a fire broke out in sonar control in the forward part of the warship. In the darkness and heavy rain, it took damage control teams and the shipyard fire department just over four hours to extinguish the blaze. The crew then spent the next six weeks helping shipyard workers repair the fire damage and get the warship's ASW systems back in battery. It was not until 13 January 1972 that Stoddert could begin two months of refresher training and other local operations.

The warship finally got underway for deployment on 25 March, arriving in Subic Bay via Midway and Guam on 7 April. The next day, she sailed for the Tonkin Gulf and commenced gunline operations upon arrival off Vietnam on the 10th. She joined other 7th Fleet units in heavy attacks against North Vietnamese military units pushing south along the coast, firing numerous bombardment missions against enemy troops and tanks advancing towards Hue. Four days later, Benjamin Stoddert joined Task Unit (TU) 77.1.0 for Operation "Freedom Train" – a series of strikes against enemy forces and their logistical infrastructure in North Vietnam.

After rearming from ammunition ships Pyro (AE-24) and Haleakala (AE-25) early on 17 April, Benjamin Stoddert joined Oklahoma City (CLG-5) for a raid on Vinh, North Vietnam. As the warships closed the port, Stoddert's electronic warfare unit registered signals from an enemy fire-control radar, followed almost immediately by the launch of two surface-to-surface missiles. Fortunately, both of the missiles missed her; one burst 50 yards to starboard while the other exploded well astern. When enemy gunfire started falling close aboard, including several air bursts that sprayed shell fragments near the warship, Benjamin Stoddert returned double salvos commencing an inconclusive gun duel that lasted about 13 minutes.

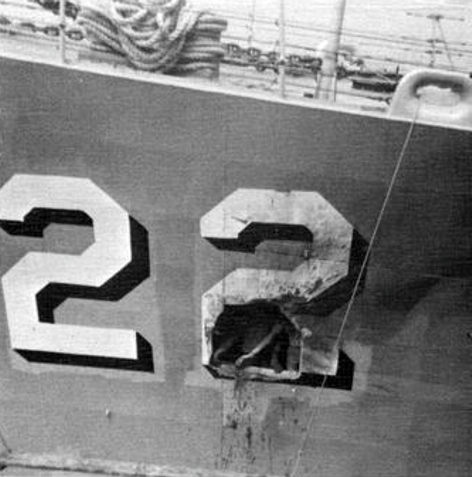
Shell damage aboard Benjamin Stoddert in April 1972

Over the next week, the guided-missile destroyer continued strikes against coastal targets, including daily bombardments of the shore as far north as Thanh Hoa. North Vietnamese shore batteries repeatedly took her under fire and finally scored on 23 April when a shell struck Benjamin Stoddert forward in the windlass room. Although put out quickly, the resulting fire destroyed the medical storeroom and the degaussing cable. Returning to gunline duty shortly thereafter, Stoddert steered south and provided defensive fire for South Vietnamese (ARVN) forces ashore – at one point firing 1,009 rounds in a 24-hour period.

After a two-week repair and refitting period at Subic Bay between 12 and 26 May, she reentered the Tonkin Gulf on the 29th for more missions against the enemy's coastal logistics pipeline. Once American mines shut down the major North Vietnamese harbors, many Chinese communist merchant ships sought refuge in strategic lagoons and inlets whence their cargoes were ferried ashore. One of the guided-missile destroyer's missions was to search out and destroy the small ferry craft and any nearby supply caches. On the night of 10 and 11 June, Benjamin Stoddert closed one such merchant ship, firing on several small craft trying to make a run for shore. When she hit one, and its crew abandoned ship; Stoddert sent a boarding party to inspect the sampan. The craft – loaded with seven tons of rice – was later sunk by 5-inch gun and machinegun fire.

Resuming gunline operations on the 14th, the warship fired at enemy troop formations attacking ARVN troops, helping to stall and then repulse this communist thrust into South Vietnam. During one such mission, at 09:10 on 26 June, the forward 5-inch mount suffered a misfire which left a live round hung up in the barrel. Sadly efforts to extract the live shell failed when it exploded, killing two sailors outright and mortally wounding two others. The blast also heavily damaged the gun mount and nearby living spaces. Departing immediately for Subic Bay, the guided-missile destroyer spent the next month in port, replacing the wrecked gun mount and repairing other damage.

According to the ship's Deck Logs, from April till the end of June when the gun mount incident occurred, 10,476 rounds were fired. Many were not logged or recorded due to the intense combat situations.

Arriving back in the Tonkin Gulf on 30 July, Benjamin Stoddert spent the next three weeks conducting fire missions with TU 70.8.9 off North Vietnam. At this point, South Vietnamese forces had taken Quang Tri City, driving North Vietnamese forces back toward the DMZ; and the naval campaign against the North began to wind down. Coincidentally, Stoddert's deployment drew to a close at about the same time, and she headed for home on 27 September, mooring in Pearl Harbor on 6 October after a quick transit. Three days later, she entered the Pearl Harbor Naval Shipyard for a much needed 30-day standdown.

Benjamin Stoddert remained in the Hawaiian area for the next seven months, conducting routine training operations in preparation for her next 7th Fleet deployment. During this time, a cease-fire agreement was signed in Paris on 27 January 1973, and American forces in South Vietnam began to withdraw. Underway for the Far East on 14 May, Stoddert stopped at Yokosuka, Japan, and Kaohsiung, Taiwan, before finally arriving off South Vietnam on 9 June. With combat operations over, the warship helped enforce the terms of the cease fire while on PIRAZ and antiair warfare picket duty in the Gulf of Tonkin.

Following liberty at Hong Kong in early August and two weeks of repairs at Subic Bay, Benjamin Stoddert received orders to sail for the Gulf of Thailand in response to a domestic crisis in Thailand. She arrived in the gulf on 29 August and operated for three days with Task Group (TG) 76.4, the contingency force assembled in case Americans had to be evacuated from Thailand. Once the crisis eased, Stoddert returned to the Gulf of Tonkin. Arriving on station on 11 September, the guided-missile destroyer spent the next six weeks patrolling off Vietnam. Her only diversion came in mid-October, when the warship conducted antisubmarine tactical training in the Subic Bay operating area. Then, on 30 October while steaming near Singapore to avoid a typhoon in the Gulf of Tonkin, she suffered a boiler breakdown which forced her back to Subic Bay.

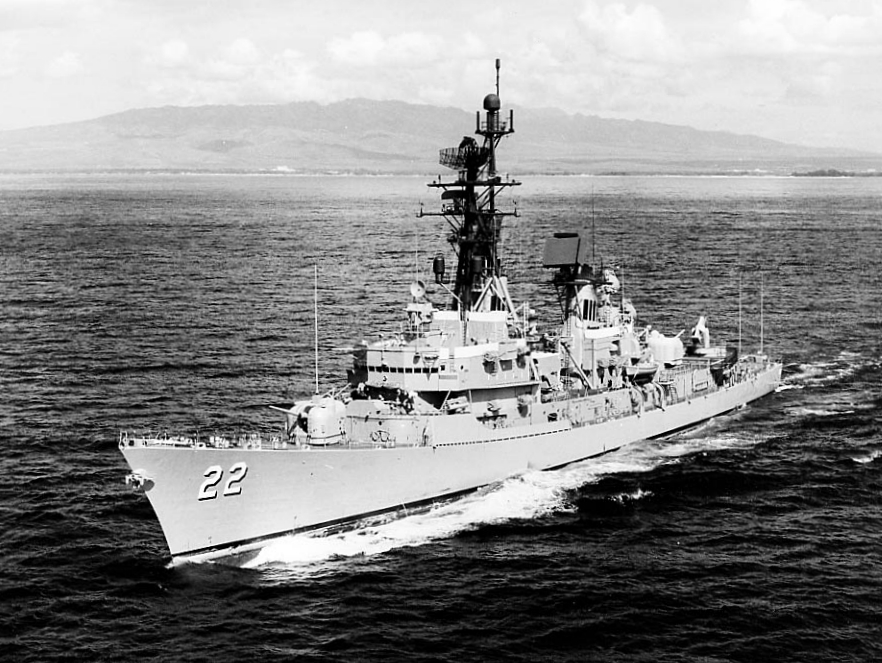
Benjamin Stoddert underway off Hawaii in 1974

Following three weeks of repairs, the warship sailed for Hawaii, arriving in Pearl Harbor, via Guam and Midway, on 7 December. Upon her return home, the guided-missile destroyer was greeted by a shrinking defense budget, lack of spare parts, and a shortage of fuel oil – the latter caused by the October 1973 Arab oil embargo – all of which cut back the operating tempo of the Pacific Fleet's surface ships. In response, the Navy concentrated on improving overall operational readiness, a routine markedly different from previous training which had concentrated on preparing warships for combat operations off Vietnam. Benjamin Stoddert spent the first three months of 1974 participating in a series of fleet-wide inspections and maintenance programs. She remained in the Pearl Harbor area through October, engaged in extensive propulsion repairs, improving her maintenance procedures, and conducting a few local training operations.

On 2 November, Benjamin Stoddert got underway for her sixth deployment to the Far East. After a stop at Midway to refuel, the guided-missile destroyer arrived at Yokosuka on the 12th. After putting to sea four days later, she conducted ASW operations with Sailfish (SS-572) near Okinawa before sailing for Jinhae, South Korea. Arriving at that port on 25 November, the warship then participated in a three-day antisubmarine operation called Exercise "Tae Kwon Do IV." After a two-week repair stop at Yokosuka in early December and a holiday port visit to Kaohsiung, Taiwan, she ended the year at Subic Bay.

In response to the growing Soviet Navy presence in the Indian Ocean, several American warships received orders to "show the flag" in the region. On 7 January 1975, Benjamin Stoddert got underway for the Indian Ocean in company with Enterprise. The warships conducted four weeks of training operations at sea before visiting Mombasa, Kenya, between 5 and 9 February. The task force sailed back to the Pacific in mid-February and arrived at Subic Bay on the 28th.

After four weeks of liberty and repairs, the warship was placed on 48-hour alert following the success of the North Vietnamese "Easter" offensive in South Vietnam. Two days later, on 5 April, the guided-missile destroyer sailed for Vung Tau, South Vietnam. Over the next two weeks, she cruised offshore with an amphibious ready group (ARG) and covered three Military Sealift Command (MSC) ships sent to the Vung Tau area on the 23d for evacuation duty. Soon the situation worsened, and the departure of Americans and South Vietnamese from Saigon began on 29 April. The guided-missile destroyer covered helicopter and boat lifts of refugees in the Vung Tau area. Then, on 3 May, she sailed to the location of a sinking South Vietnamese naval ship and rescued 19 people, including one woman and four children. Later that same day, the warship took on another 158 refugees picked up by a Korean fishing vessel.

With the end of the evacuation after the fall of Saigon, Benjamin Stoddert sailed for Hawaii on 9 May, arriving at Pearl Harbor, via Guam and Midway, on the 21st. The warship spent the summer conducting local operations and preparing for a regular overhaul, which she began at the Pearl Harbor Naval Shipyard on 1 October. Shifted out of drydock on 6 February 1976, she conducted a long series of full-power runs and sea trials before finishing her 10-month overhaul on 17 August. The crew then spent the remainder of the year conducting training evolutions, various inspections, and helicopter flight deck certifications. On 17 February 1977, the guided-missile destroyer got underway for "RIMPAC 77," a multinational naval exercise held in the Hawaiian Islands.

After finishing this exercise on 1 March, she sailed west for her first western Pacific cruise in almost two years. The end of the Vietnam War two years earlier meant that the guided-missile destroyer conducted different operations than during her previous deployments to the Far East. Instead of antiair or gunline combat operations aimed at the North Vietnamese, the warship concentrated on training to counter the threat of Soviet nuclear-powered submarines and guided-missile warships to the western Pacific region. After a stop in the Philippines in late March, Benjamin Stoddert steamed for Okinawa on 1 April and thence to the waters off Japan and South Korea for a series of exercises. She carried out an ASW exercise against Barb (SSN-596) on 6 April, a "war-at-sea" exercise with Coral Sea on the 20th, and another ASW drill with Sailfish on 5 May before returning to Subic Bay on the 17th. Over the next eight weeks, Stoddert trained in Philippine waters, practicing underway replenishment and other drills. On 6 July, she escorted Coral Sea north to Okinawa, and then participated in "MissileEx 4-77" before putting into Pusan, South Korea, on the 20th. After a week of liberty, she joined elements of the South Korean Navy for ASW exercise "Tae Kwon Do" on 30 July. The guided-missile destroyer then steamed south, stopping at Hong Kong in mid-August before returning to Subic Bay on the 21st.

For her trip home, which began on 6 September, Benjamin Stoddert detoured south, crossing the equator on the 10th, and mooring at Fremantle, Australia, on 17 September. Following a five-day port visit, the warship sailed on to Melbourne, Australia, and to Dunedin, New Zealand, before arriving at Pago Pago, American Samoa, on 14 September. Underway the next day, the warship visited Western Samoa before proceeding on to Hawaii, to arrive in Pearl Harbor on the 22d. She spent the remainder of the year engaged in post-deployment leave and upkeep. Starting on 9 January 1978, Stoddert began eight months of local operations in Hawaiian waters. These evolutions included several firings on the Pacific Missile Range, highlighted by the successful shootdown of two MQM 74C drones by RIM 66A Standard missiles on 29 July.

Following a series of inspections and ship surveys, the warship got underway for the South Pacific on 22 September. After crossing the equator on the 28th, Benjamin Stoddert anchored at Funafuti, Tuvalu, on 29 September. The next day, she fired a 21-gun salute in recognition of that country's independence. Proceeding westward on 2 October, the warship stopped at Suva, Fiji Islands, on the 4th; visited Cairns, Australia, on 10 October; and rendezvoused with Constellation (CV-64) south of Guam on the 21st. Delayed by the need to evade a typhoon near the Philippines, the warships did not put into Subic Bay until 30 October. Over the next seven weeks, Stoddert conducted operations similar to those of her most recent deployment. Attached to the Midway (CV-41) task group, she provided screen services to the carrier as the task group cruised as far south as Pattaya, Thailand, and as far north as Kyūshū, Japan. After arriving at the latter place on 22 December, she ended the year moored at the Naval Ordnance Facility, Sasebo.

Shifting to Yokosuka on 7 January 1979, the warship received four weeks of repairs there at the Naval Ship Repair Facility. Benjamin Stoddert then steamed to Okinawa on 10 February to participate in an antiair warfare exercise called "BuzzardEx 1–79." Moving on to Subic Bay, the guided-missile destroyer provided planeguard services for Constellation (CV-64) through the end of the month. Departing Philippine waters on 7 March, the warship returned to Pearl Harbor on the 19th to begin a seven-week maintenance availability.

== 1980s ==
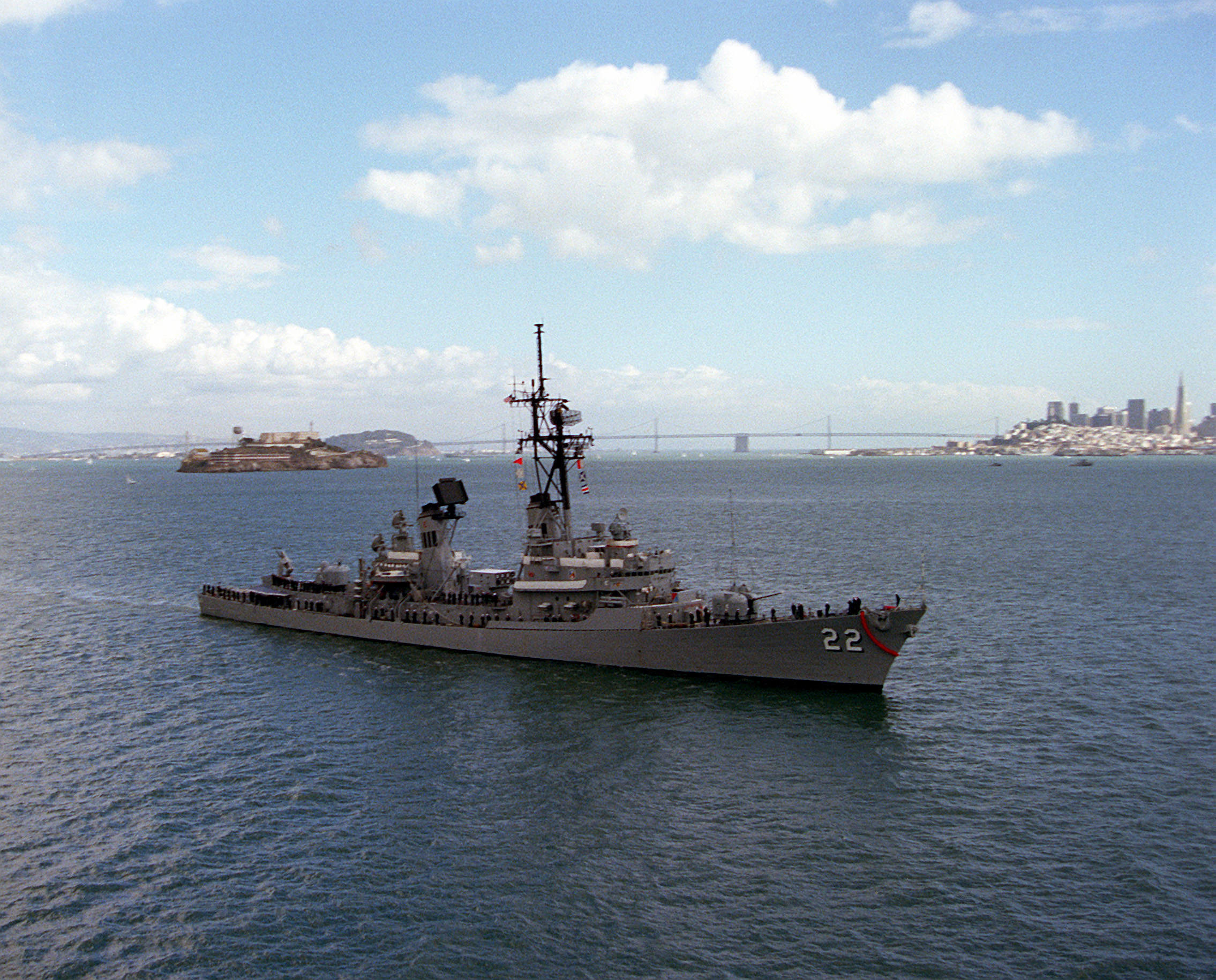
Benjamin Stoddert underway in San Francisco Bay on 1 October 1981

Continued boiler trouble kept the guided-missile destroyer in port, save for a few local operations, for the remainder of the year. Then, following a series of tests and inspections, Benjamin Stoddert commenced a major overhaul at the Pearl Harbor Naval Shipyard on 3 January 1980. After five months in drydock, she moved to a berth for continued industrial work; and it was not until 30 November that the guided-missile destroyer got underway for her first sea trials. The crew spent the next five months putting the warship through full power exams, sonar tests, and weapons system acceptance trials. During the latter, on 31 March 1981, she successfully fired six Standard missiles on the Pacific missile range. The warship then conducted training and other local operations out of Pearl Harbor through the summer and into the fall. On 19 October, she set out for San Francisco, arriving there on the 29th. After a week of liberty, the guided-missile destroyer cruised south to San Diego, mooring at the naval station on 6 November. Benjamin Stoddert then participated in Exercise "ReadiEx 1-82", the highlight of which was a missile firing exercise held on 23 November. Steaming to Hawaii the next day, she moored alongside Jason (AR-8) in Pearl Harbor on 1 December for voyage repairs.

On 22 February 1982, Benjamin Stoddert departed Hawaii for her ninth western Pacific cruise. After a brief stop at Guam on 6 March, she proceeded on to the Philippines. While en route to Subic Bay, the warship conducted both antisubmarine and antiair warfare exercises, an underway routine she would continue throughout this deployment. Following a week in Subic Bay, the guided-missile destroyer steamed to Korea and, between 28 and 30 March, participated in amphibious Exercise "Team Spirit 82." She then sailed between Hong Kong, Subic Bay, and Yokosuka before anchoring in Shimoda, Japan, on 15 May. In the latter port, she took part in the Black Ship Festival, commemorating Commodore Matthew C. Perry's opening of Japan to foreign trade in 1854. Benjamin Stoddert returned to Subic Bay on the 24th.

Leaving the Philippines on 2 June, the guided-missile destroyer sailed to Pattaya, Thailand, anchoring there on the 6th. That same day, tension between the Soviet Union and the West increased after Israel invaded Lebanon. International friction notwithstanding, the warship joined the previously scheduled exercise "Cobra Gold 82" in the Gulf of Thailand on the 7th. Her participation included naval gunfire support for an amphibious landing exercise and ASW operations with three Royal Thai Navy warships. Still, heightened Cold War tension intruded when, just before midnight on 8 June, Aneroid – a Soviet intelligence gathering trawler – fired an illumination flare over Thai ship HTMS Khirirat.

Departing Thailand, on 19 June, Benjamin Stoddert, guided-missile cruiser Sterett (CG-31), and two other destroyers passed into the South China Sea on their way to Subic Bay. The next evening, Soviet aircraft – presumably from bases in Vietnam – began shadowing the American warships. At around 22:00, a Soviet aircraft dropped 16 flares over Turner Joy (DD-951). A few minutes later, Lynde McCormick (DDG-8) received .30-caliber machinegun fire from an unidentified ship in the vicinity. The warship responded in kind, deliberately aiming high; and the foreign ship ceased fire. Although tension remained high the rest of the night, no other incidents occurred; and the warships arrived at Subic Bay on 23 June. After that, however, Stoddert passed her remaining five weeks in the western Pacific without incident; and, following two "war-at-sea" exercises in the waters off Japan, she steamed for home on 6 August.

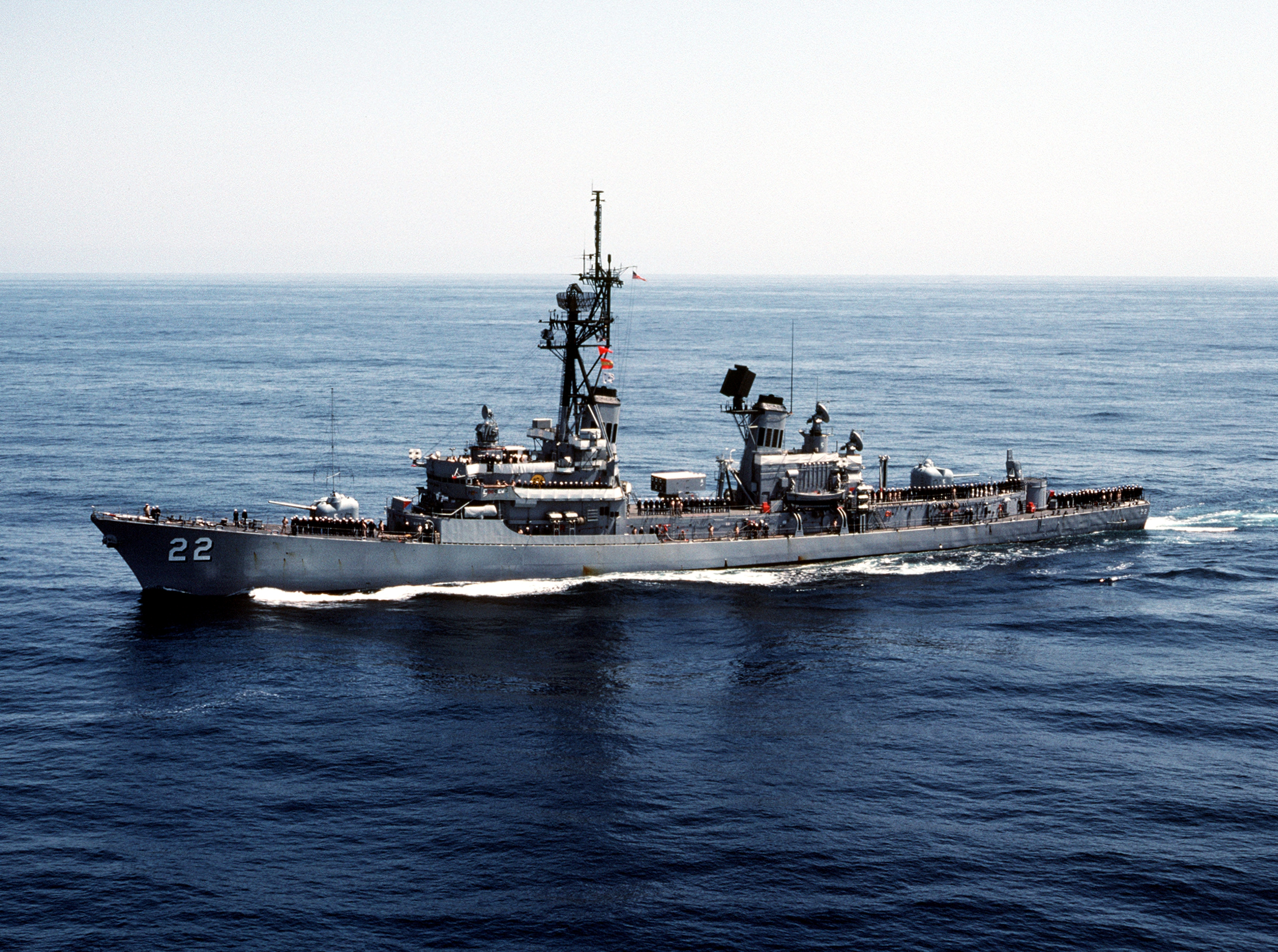
Benjamin Stoddert underway in 1983

Mooring at Pearl Harbor on 12 August, the warship spent the rest of the year doing maintenance work on her boilers and standing several regular safety and readiness inspections. During the first three weeks of 1983, Benjamin Stoddert prepared for a joint Navy-Air Force exercise in the Hawaiian Islands. This refresher training included helicopter operations, naval gunfire support, damage control drills, and antisubmarine systems' tests. The highlight of Exercise "MidPacTraEx," held between 31 January and 3 February, was a defensive ASW operation with Harold E. Holt (FF-1074) and Willamette (AO-180). Later that month, she served as "surface deep dive safety ship" for Sargo (SSN-583).

In a scenery shift from her familiar operational zone, the guided-missile destroyer sailed from Pearl Harbor to the southern California operating area on 31 March. There, she conducted a "war at sea" exercise with DesRon 17 in early April. The warship then joined Ranger (CV-61) and operated with her battle group along the west coasts of California and Central America for the next four weeks. These evolutions were intended, in part, to demonstrate American resolve in checking the spread of communism in Central America.

Returning to Pearl Harbor on 25 May, the guided-missile destroyer remained in port for the next eight weeks. Between 21 and 24 July, the warship took part in a joint ASW exercise with Sample (FF-1048), Cochrane (DDG-21), Harold E. Holt, and three Japanese warships before getting ready to deploy overseas once more. On 26 August, Benjamin Stoddert put to sea with Ranger's battle group and steered for the Philippines, arriving in Subic Bay on 14 September. Earlier in the year, and partly in response to the outbreak of the Iran–Iraq War in 1980, the United States had established Central Command (CentCom) in the western reaches of the Indian Ocean to protect American security interests in the Middle East; and Ranger's group received orders to patrol the northern portion of the Arabian Sea in support of CentCom's mission.

Departing Subic Bay on 26 September, the battle group set course for the Strait of Malacca. The unit's transit of the South China Sea was interrupted on the 30th, however, when Benjamin Stoddert rescued 39 Vietnamese refugees from their sinking boat, an act that later brought her the Humanitarian Service Medal. Once the refugees had been passed along, the group continued on south and west, passing through the Strait of Malacca and entering the Indian Ocean on 4 October. Linking up with a British force built around HMS Invincible, the warships sailed northwest and arrived on station in the Arabian Sea on 12 October. Stoddert remained in the Arabian Sea and the Persian Gulf through the end of the year, helping to assure Western access to oil and countering the spread of Soviet influence in the region. During this period, she paid two visits to El Masirah, Oman, and called at Karachi, Pakistan.

On 15 January 1984, the American task group turned east for the long voyage back to Hawaii. After stops in Singapore and Subic Bay, Benjamin Stoddert moored in Pearl Harbor on 22 February. Six days later, she entered the Pearl Harbor Naval Shipyard for a major equipment overhaul. During the ensuing 15-month shipyard period, the guided-missile destroyer received new radar and fire-control systems, the navy tactical data system (NTDS), the integrated automatic detection and tracking system (IADTS) and a modernized steam engineering plant. In addition to her combat systems' overhaul, she had her antiship capabilities enhanced by the installation of Harpoon missile launchers. Completing the overhaul on 9 July 1985, Stoddert occupied the rest of the year with a series of local operations and inspections. These ranged from a joint ASW exercise with Australian and New Zealand warships at sea to the more mundane propulsion plant and ordnance safety inspections while in port.

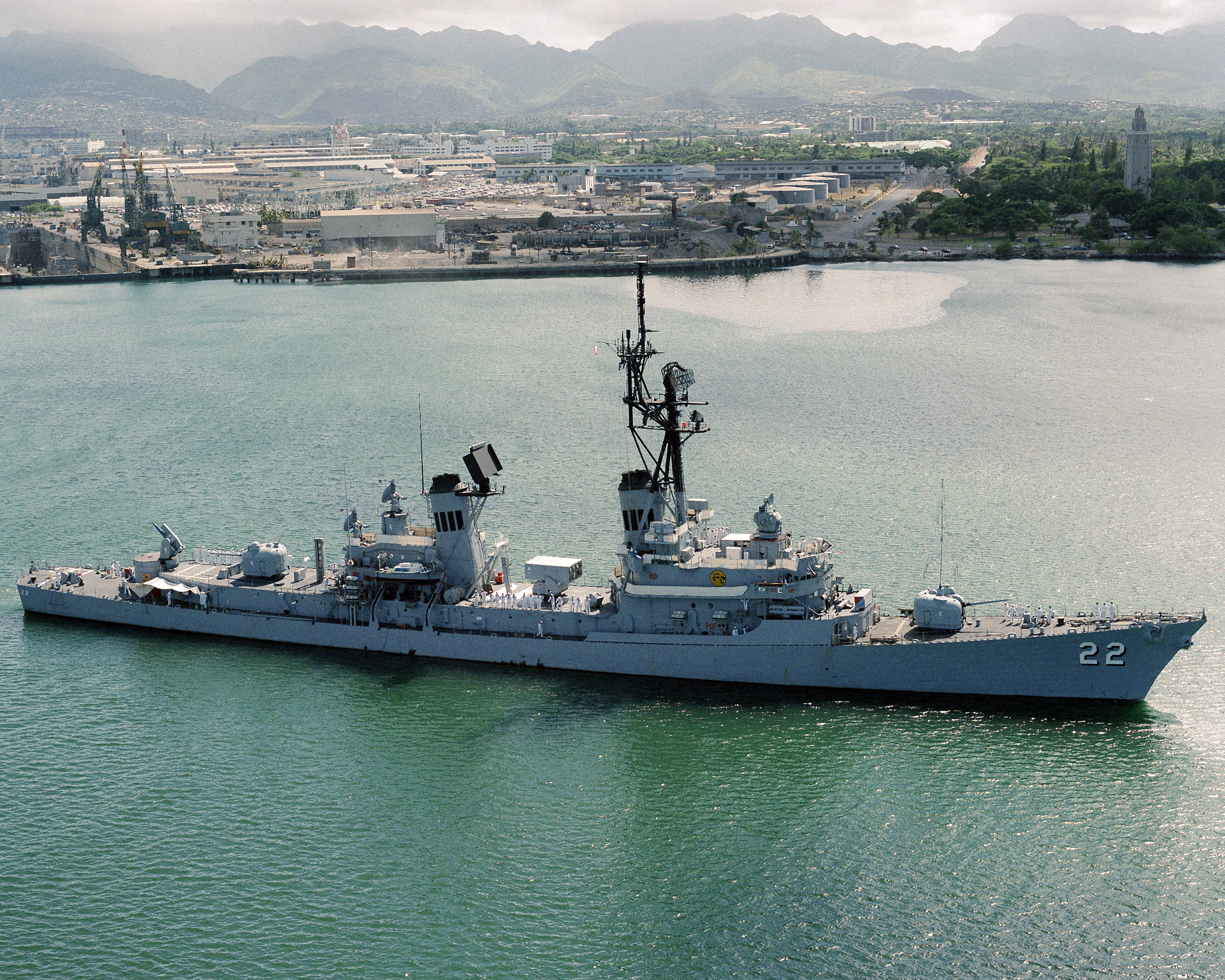
Benjamin Stoddert leaving Pearl Harbor in 1986

The warship's first exercise in the new year took place between 23 and 28 January 1986. Benjamin Stoddert operated as part of an "enemy" surface and submarine force that "attacked" the Enterprise battle group. Two more individual ship exercises followed in February. Then, after a command inspection in late March and a nuclear weapons certification inspection in early April, Stoddert got underway for "RimPac 86", an international naval exercise held in Hawaiian waters between 21 May and 12 June. As a unit of the "Blue Force," she served as communications link ship with the Japanese Maritime Self-Defense Force warships involved in the maneuvers. The guided-missile destroyer also covered a SEAL team insertion and extraction mission during the exercise. During rimpac86 the Stoddert had port calls in San Diego, San Francisco, Seattle and Vancouver BC, where crew members were able to attend the Vancouver Worlds Fair, before returning home.

After five more months of local training operations and other preparatory tasks, Benjamin Stoddert finally got underway for another Middle East deployment on 28 November. Steaming in company with Hepburn (FF-1055) and Mahlon S. Tisdale (FFG-27), she first sailed to the Philippines. After a week of upkeep at Subic Bay, Stoddert set out south on 21 December, stopping at Singapore on the 25th before passing the Strait of Malacca on the 26th and ending the year with a fuel stop at Colombo, Sri Lanka. The guided-missile destroyer continued on to the Middle East in the new year and relieved Goldsborough on station in the Persian Gulf on 6 January. Although Iranian and Iraqi attacks on neutral tankers had begun to increase in early 1987, no firm American policy regarding this "tanker war" had yet been established. This limited Stoddert's mission, therefore, to surveillance operations against Iranian forces, especially "Silkworm" missile sites in the Strait of Hormuz, and to the provision of communications and other data links to friendly aircraft in the region.

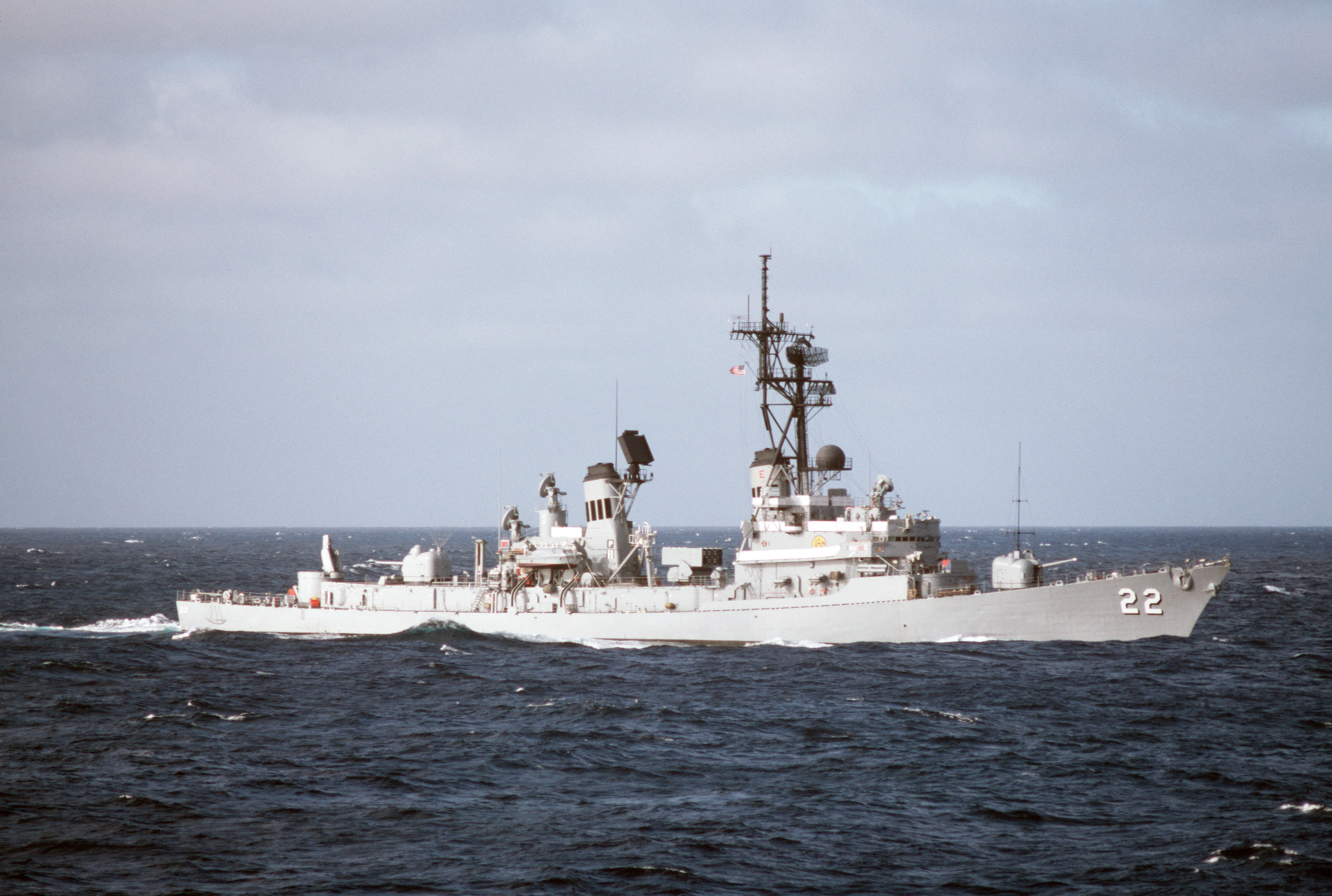
Benjamin Stoddert underway on 1 July 1986

Relieved by Waddell (DDG-24) on 4 April after three months on station, the warship steamed toward home, passing into the Indian Ocean and stopping at Colombo on the 9th to refuel. Following port visits to Phuket, Thailand, between 13 and 16 April and at Hong Kong between 23 and 27 April, the guided-missile destroyer moored at Pearl Harbor on 9 May. After a four-week leave and upkeep standdown, Benjamin Stoddert resumed the familiar routine. This included various weapons and supply inspections, equipment alterations in the shipyard, and training ashore for crew members. In addition, the warship participated in a joint Navy-Coast Guard exercise in late June, took part in ASW drills in mid-August, and served as ready duty destroyer during the month of September. She then began a phased maintenance availability at the Pearl Harbor Naval Shipyard on 26 October.

With the repairs and upgrades to her engineering plant finished on 9 February 1988, Benjamin Stoddert began preparing for an upcoming fleet exercise. The warship set out for San Diego on 15 March, completing a transit exercise – including service as the target for simulated attacks by two attack submarines – before mooring in San Diego harbor on the 31st. On 8 April, she put to sea for "FleetEx 88-2", a carrier battle group exercise held off southern California, in which Stoddert's crew took "revenge" for the transit exercise by successfully engaging a target submarine with an exercise torpedo. Later, she joined the Carl Vinson (CVN-70) battle group and, in simulated air attacks, shot down three target drones with as many Standard SM-1 missiles. After more than two weeks of intensive training, the warship sailed for home, arriving in Pearl Harbor on 30 April.

Although originally scheduled for an overseas deployment in June, the warship delayed her departure until September so she could join the Nimitz (CVN-68) battle group. Her crew spent the summer testing new maintenance procedures, passing safety inspections, and taking the warship to sea for exercises such as the combined American, Australian, Canadian, and Japanese "RimPac 88" battle problems held between 7 and 17 July. Finally embarking on her deployment on 20 September, the warship joined Waddell, Hepburn, Barbey (FF-1088), Kiska (AE-35), and Willamette (AO-180) in Battle Group "Bravo" for the voyage west to the Persian Gulf. After a stop at Subic Bay between 7 and 11 October, the group conducted a few days of gunnery practice at the Tabones range in the Philippines before sailing to Hong Kong for liberty. Departing the British Crown Colony on the 20th, the battle group headed south, navigated the Malacca Strait, and passed into the Indian Ocean. From there, the warships took up station in the northern part of the Arabian Sea on 30 October.

Although the "tanker war" in the Persian Gulf had ended on 20 August with the cease-fire between Iran and Iraq, American warships still patrolled the region, replacing tanker-escort duty with general "zone defense." Benjamin Stoddert remained in the Arabian Sea for the first 10 days of this mission before receiving a brief availability alongside Prairie at the Masirah anchorage between 10 and 16 November. From there, she moved to the Strait of Hormuz and relieved Antietam (CG-54) as patrol ship there. Turning over that patrol station to California (CGN-36) on 2 December, the warship returned to the Arabian Sea for another 10 days with Battle Group "Bravo". After 56 days at sea, the crew displayed palpable relief when the guided-missile destroyer put into Abu Dhabi for a three-day port visit on 14 December. While returning to her unit on the 18th, Stoddert provided medical assistance to three injured crew members of the British merchant vessel British Trident. Shortly thereafter, the group sailed east, passing through the Malacca Strait and anchoring at Singapore on 31 December.

Following a six-day port visit, the group steamed back into the Indian Ocean for a quick drop south of the equator on 9 January 1989 before returning through the Strait of Malacca on the 19th. The warships then steamed north into the South China Sea for four days of ASW exercises with units of the Royal Thai Navy, followed by a three-day visit to Pattaya Beach, Thailand. Benjamin Stoddert then sailed independently for Subic Bay, arriving there on 1 February to begin a week-long upkeep and maintenance availability dedicated to main propulsion plant repairs. Departing the Philippines on 8 February, Stoddert steamed across the Pacific and moored in Pearl Harbor on 21 February.

At the end of a four-week post-deployment standdown, the guided-missile destroyer began preparations for a series of engineering and general survey inspections set for late spring. Those inspections ended late in June, and July passed relatively slowly, marked by an overnight "tiger cruise" for crew dependents on the 18th, and a port visit to Hilo, Hawaii, between 19 and 25 July. A week after that, Benjamin Stoddert departed Pearl Harbor for two weeks of law enforcement operations with the United States Coast Guard. The warship used her surface search radars and other equipment to spot small craft, which were then boarded by Coast Guard detachments in search of drug smugglers. Back in port on 11 August, Stoddert spent the next week training submarine prospective commanding officers.

== 1990s ==
Toward the end of August, Benjamin Stoddert started preparing for a phased maintenance availability, which she began on 12 September in the Pearl Harbor Naval Shipyard. During the ensuing five months, the warship received extensive equipment upgrades and regularly scheduled maintenance work on her propulsion plant. Pronounced ready for duty on 1 March, the warship conducted another Coast Guard law enforcement operation in Hawaiian waters. Then, on 16 April, she joined the familiar multinational exercise "RIMPAC 90". She conducted ASW and anti-surface ship exercises during this period, highlighted by a successful Standard missile shot in early May.

Back in Pearl Harbor on 12 May, Benjamin Stoddert did not leave Hawaii until 18 June when she set out for Central America and another Coast Guard law enforcement deployment. The warship began patrol operations off Baja California on the 27th and remained there – save for a single port visit to San Diego – through 11 August. After rendezvousing with Badger (FF-1071) and Kawishiwi (AO-146), the guided-missile destroyer sailed south for a drug interdiction patrol off Panama. These operations continued until 11 September, when the warship put into Rodman, Panama – the first landfall for the crew after 47 days at sea. Departing Panama on the 14th, the guided-missile destroyer returned to her patrol station, remaining there until 29 September when she was relieved by Waddell. Instead of sailing northwest for home, however, Stoddert passed through the Panama Canal on 3 October, entered the Caribbean Sea – the first and only arm of the Atlantic Ocean to wash her hull – and pulled into Willemstad, Curaçao, on the 6th. After a five-day port visit, she turned west for her transit home, arriving in Pearl Harbor on 29 October. The guided-missile destroyer spent the rest of the year in port undergoing routine inspections and maintenance.

Benjamin Stoddert began her last year in service with a surface warfare exercise in late January 1991, and her crew remained busy with training through the end of March. Departing Hawaii on 3 April, the warship cruised in southern California waters for the next five weeks, conducting antisubmarine warfare (ASW) drills and naval gunfire practice off San Clemente in addition to readiness training with the Abraham Lincoln (CVN-72) battle group. She returned to Pearl Harbor on 15 May.

Following a series of inspections in June, the warship remained in port – save for a few days of local operations – as the crew prepared her for inactivation. On 3 September, the guided-missile destroyer began pre-inactivation procedures and unloaded all her fuel and ammunition. Benjamin Stoddert was decommissioned at Pearl Harbor on 20 December 1991, and her name was struck from the Navy list on 20 November 1992. On 7 September 1995, she was transferred to the Maritime Administration and was berthed with its National Defense Reserve Fleet at Suisun Bay, Calif., to await disposal. On 3 February 2001, while under tow to Brownsville, Texas, for scrapping, the old guided missile destroyer took on water and sank in the Pacific.

== Honors ==
Benjamin Stoddert received nine battle stars for Vietnam service.
Combat Action Ribbon & Meritorious Unit Citation – 1972 WestPac

== Bibliography ==
- Friedman, Norman (1995). "United Kingdom". In Chumbley, Stephen (ed.). Conway's All The World's Fighting Ships 1947–1995. Annapolis, Maryland: Naval Institute Press. pp. 544–634. ISBN 1-55750-132-7.
