= USS Grand Canyon (AD-28) =

Tender of the United States Navy

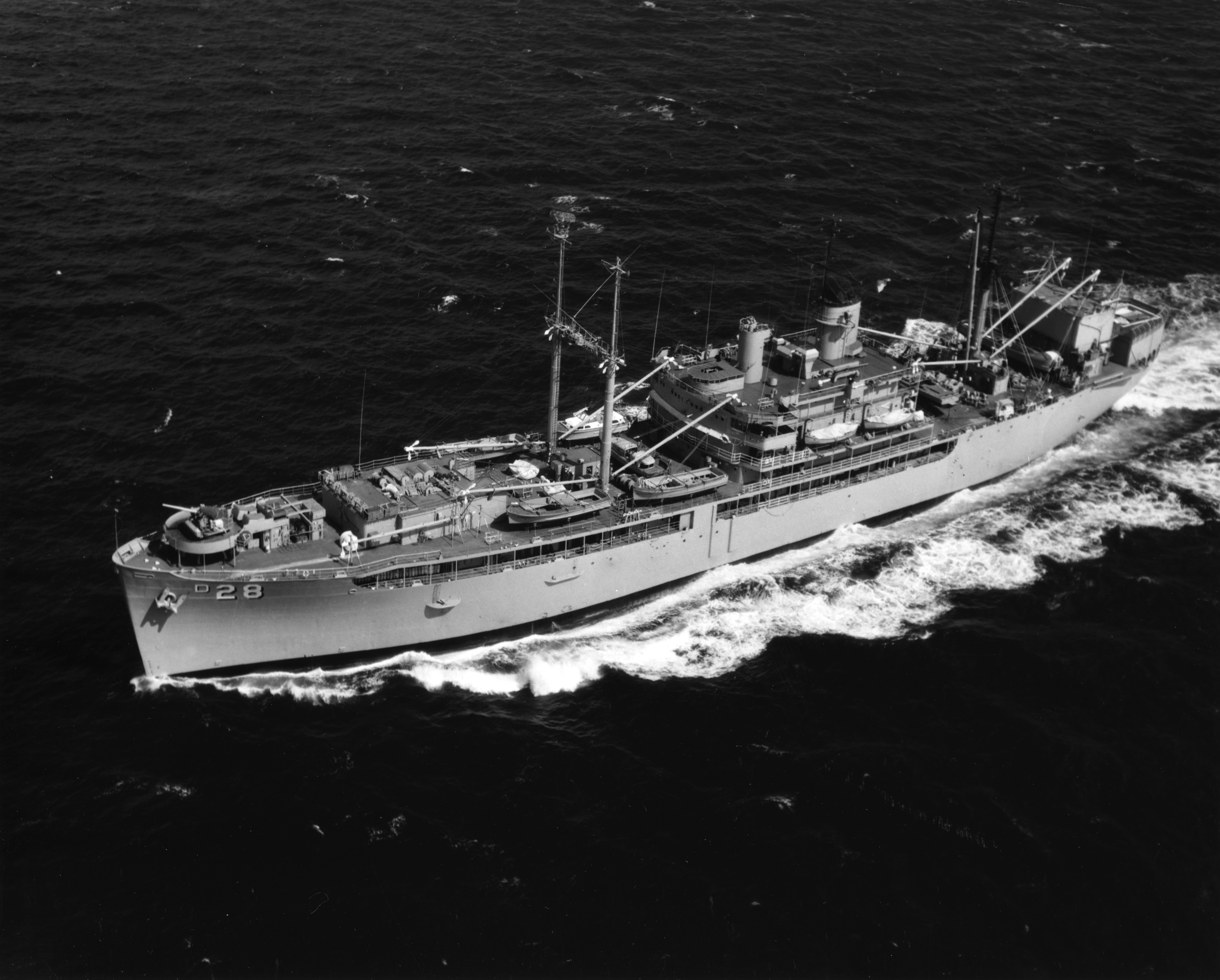
- Grand Canyon in 1971

History

United States
- Name: USS Grand Canyon
- Namesake: Grand Canyon
- Builder: Todd Pacific Shipyards, Tacoma, Washington
- Laid down: 16 October 1944
- Launched: 27 April 1945
- Commissioned: 5 April 1946
- Decommissioned: 1 September 1978
- Reclassified: AR-28 (Repair ship), 11 March 1971
- Stricken: 1 September 1978
- Fate: Sold for scrapping, June 1980

General characteristics
- Type: Shenandoah-class destroyer tender
- Displacement: 11,755 long tons (11,944 t) light; 16,880 long tons (17,151 t) full
- Length: 492 ft (150 m)
- Beam: 69 ft 6 in (21.18 m)
- Draft: 28 ft (8.5 m)
- Propulsion: Steam turbine, single propeller
- Speed: 18 knots (33 km/h; 21 mph)
- Complement: 977 officers and enlisted
- Armament: 2 × single 5"/38 caliber gun mounts; 8 × 40 mm AA guns; 22 × 20 mm guns AA guns

USS Grand Canyon (AD-28) was a Shenandoah-class destroyer tender built at the tail end of World War II, and named for the Grand Canyon on the Colorado River.

Grand Canyon was laid down 16 November 1944 as a Maritime Commission type (C3) hull, under Maritime Commission contract (MC hull 206) at Todd Pacific Shipyards, Inc. out of Tacoma, Washington, launched 27 April 1945, sponsored by Mrs. W. L. Mann, and commissioned 5 April 1946.

== Service history ==
After brief shakedown off the coast of Southern California, Grand Canyon departed Port Townsend, Washington on 26 June 1946 en route to Newport, Rhode Island via the Panama Canal Zone. She arrived in Newport on 20 July. Assigned the task of keeping United States Navy destroyers in operation, Grand Canyon cleared Newport on 17 September 1946 for her first tour with the 6th Fleet in the Mediterranean Sea. After a visit to Palermo, Sicily, and a 4½-month stay at Naples she returned to the States, arriving back in Norfolk on 1 March 1947.

Between 1 November 1947 and 12 November 1954 Grand Canyon continued her support of 6th Fleet destroyers, making six Mediterranean deployments. During this time she participated in some of the largest peacetime service operations ever undertaken. Grand Canyon continued her tender duties in the U.S. until 24 September 1956 when she again departed for the Mediterranean for her eighth tour. By 20 October the Suez Crisis had reached the serious stage and the majority of the 6th Fleet proceeded into the Eastern Mediterranean. During this period the Grand Canyon, as flagship, took part in fleet exercises and visited the ports of Augusta, Messina and Taranto. As the Suez problem subsided she sailed for Cannes, France on 20 December in time for the Christmas holidays. Grand Canyon returned to Fall River, Massachusetts on 13 March 1957.

On 3 September 1957 Grand Canyon joined with other units of the Atlantic Fleet, this time to participate in NATO fall exercises. By 16 September she had crossed the Arctic Circle operating west of Norway. After visits to Tromsø, Norway, and the Isle of Portland, England, Grand Canyon once again returned to Newport, arriving on 21 October. Grand Canyon continued her tender duties out of Fall River until 1 August 1958 when she sailed for Souda Bay on the Island of Crete to support the 6th Fleet in operations off Lebanon. For the next four months she supported destroyers and other types while helping to stabilize the situation and block aggression in Asia Minor. Besides Souda Bay, Grand Canyon visited İzmir, Turkey, Athens, Greece, Naples, Italy and Barcelona, Spain before returning home in December.

Grand Canyon spent most of 1959 with tender duties at Newport except for duty at Charleston, South Carolina between 29 August 1959 and 11 January 1960. She cleared Charleston on 11 January 1960 to participate in Operation "Springboard", returning to Newport on 7 February; thence to Bermuda and New York before returning to Newport. Between October, 1960 and August, 1961 Grand Canyon tended ships at Newport, Boston, and Norfolk, Virginia. After her ninth Mediterranean tour August 1961 to March 1962 Grand Canyon returned to Newport and again took up her duties there until the fall. She proceeded to San Juan, Puerto Rico, arriving 3 November 1962 to start tending ships of the South Atlantic Blockading Fleet during the Cuban Missile Crisis and subsequent quarantine. Grand Canyon again helped demonstrate the mobility and versatility of sea power. She returned to Newport on 5 December. Grand Canyon made her tenth deployment to the Mediterranean between 6 February and 27 June 1963. The ship entered Bethlehem Steel Yards in East Boston for modernization and refitting. With the completion of modernization on 3 January 1964, Grand Canyon sailed for Guantanamo Bay and San Juan on training cruises. Returning to Mayport, Florida on 11 May, she tended destroyers there until her departure for Newport on 20 June for similar duties at that station.

On 27 November Grand Canyon departed Newport for her 11th Mediterranean cruise, relieving the USS Shenandoah as 6th Fleet tender. She reached Palma de Mallorca in December and until 16 April 1965 tended ships in French, Italian, and Spanish ports. After returning to Newport on 27 April she served there and at Norfolk during the next 11 months. Between 29 March 1966 and 12 August she again served ships of the 6th Fleet in the Mediterranean. During the remainder of the year she operated out of Newport. Into 1967 Grand Canyon continued to provide tender and repair facilities for destroyer-type ships of the Atlantic Fleet and the 6th Fleet. The Grand Canyon relieved the USS Yellowstone in Naples, Italy November 1967. Grand Canyon was reclassified Repair Ship (AR-28) on 11 March 1971, and was decommissioned and struck from the Naval Vessel Register 1 September 1978. Grand Canyon was sold for scrapping in June 1980 to Union Minerals and Alloy Corporation of New York.
