= USS Arrowhead (AD-35) =

Tender of the United States Navy

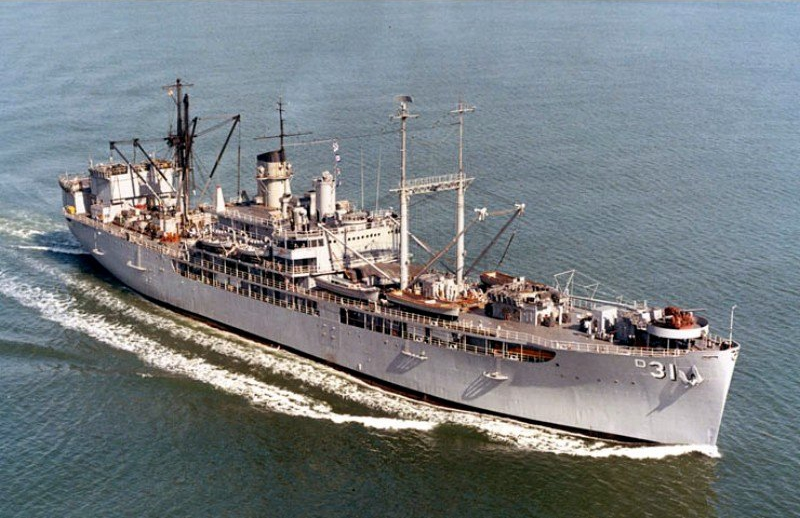
- Arrowhead's sister ship, USS Tidewater seen in 1965.

History

United States
- Name: Arrowhead
- Namesake: arrowhead
- Builder: Puget Sound Navy Yard
- Laid down: 1 December 1944
- Identification: Hull number: AD-35
- Fate: Cancelled, 11 August 1945

General characteristics
- Class & type: Shenandoah-class destroyer tender
- Displacement: 11,755 tons (Light); 16,900 tons (Full)
- Length: 492 ft (150 m)
- Beam: 69 ft 6 in (21.18 m)
- Draft: 28 ft (8.5 m)
- Installed power: four turbo-drive 750 kW 450 V AC; two diesel-drive 300 kW 120 V/240 V DC; single propeller, 8,500 shp (6,300 kW)
- Propulsion: one Westinghouse geared turbine engines; two Foster and Wheeler D-type boilers 435 psi (3,000 kPa) at 740 °F (393 °C); double Westinghouse main reduction gear
- Speed: 18.4 knots (34.1 km/h; 21.2 mph)
- Complement: 63 officers, 986 enlisted
- Armament: 2 × single 5-inch/38 cal. dual-purpose gun mounts; 4 × twin 40 mm AA gun mounts; 22 × single 20 mm AA gun mounts

USS Arrowhead (AD-35) was a planned Shenandoah-class destroyer tender of the United States Navy during World War II. She was laid down at Puget Sound Naval Shipyard on 1 December 1944. Due to the defeat of Germany, and atomic bombings of Hiroshima and Nagasaki, Japan, her construction was cancelled on 11 August 1945, shortly before the war's end.
