= Charleston Naval Shipyard =

Former U.S. Navy facility in South Carolina

- North Charleston, South Carolina
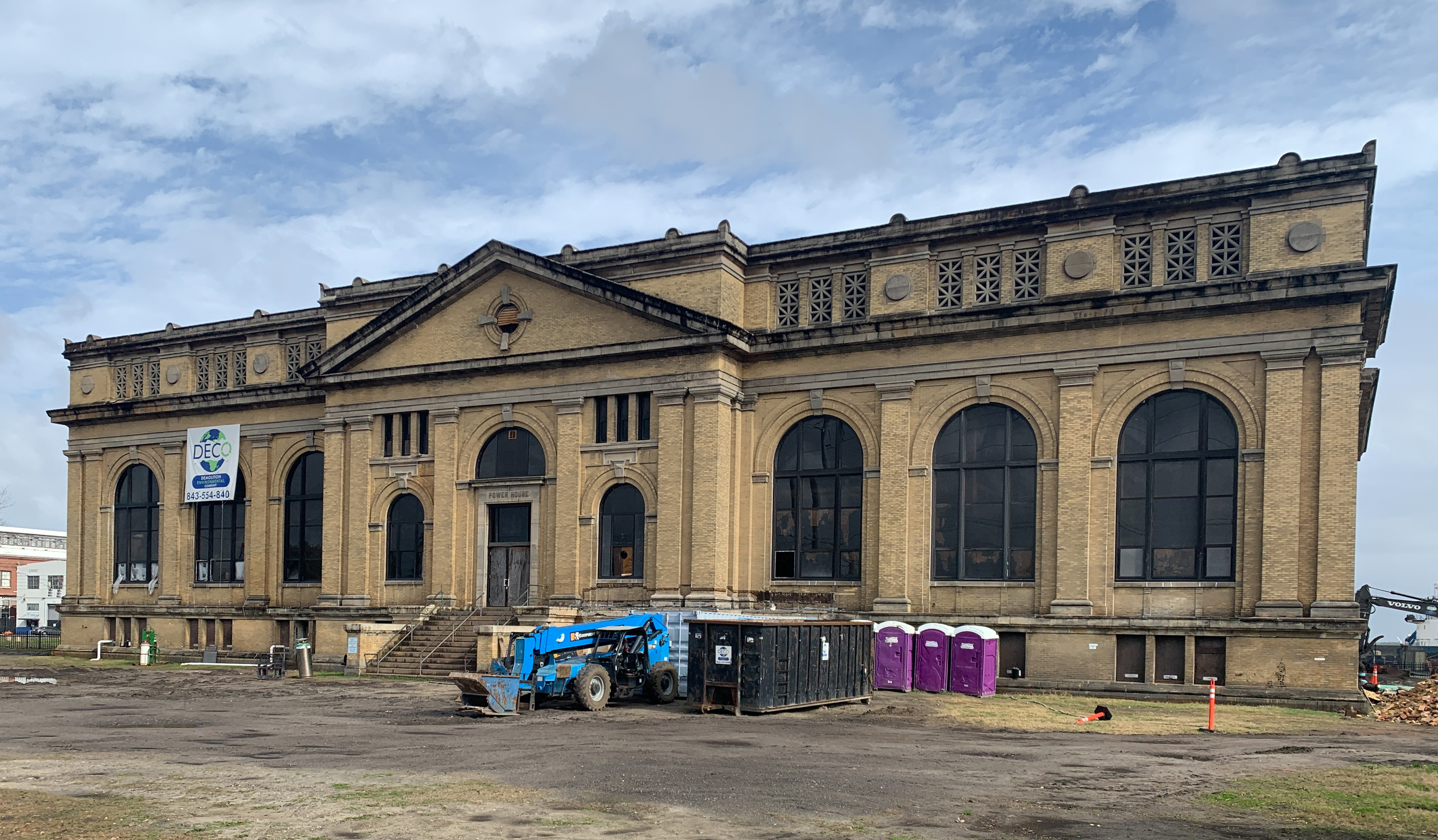

Site information
- Type: Shipyard
- Controlled by: United States Navy

Location
- Coordinates: 32°51′47″N 79°57′59″W

Site history
- Built: 1909
- In use: 1901–1996 - now as Detyens Shipyards
- Battles/wars
- Charleston Navy Yard Historic District
- U.S. National Register of Historic Places
- U.S. Historic district
- Location within South Carolina Location within the United States
- Location: Roughly bounded by First St., Hobson Ave., Avenue D, Fourth and Fifth Sts., and the drydocks bet. First and Thirteenth S, North Charleston, South Carolina
- Coordinates: 32°51′38″N 79°57′53″W
- Area: 145 acres (59 ha)
- Built: 1903
- Architect: multiple
- Architectural style: Late 19th And 20th Century Revivals, Modern Movement
- NRHP reference No.: 06000699
- Added to NRHP: August 9, 2006

Charleston Naval Shipyard (formerly known as the Charleston Navy Yard) was a U.S. Navy ship building and repair facility located along the west bank of the Cooper River, in North Charleston, South Carolina and part of Naval Base Charleston.

== History ==
It began operations in 1901 as a drydock, and continued as a navy facility until 1996 when it ceased operations as the result of recommendations of the 1993 Base Realignment and Closure Commission. At that time it was leased to Detyens Shipyards, Inc.

Originally designated as the Navy Yard and later as the Naval Base it had a large impact upon the local community, the tri-county area and the entire State of South Carolina.

The yard first produced the destroyer USS Tillman (DD-135), then began to increase production in the 1930s. A total of 21 destroyers were assembled at the naval facility.

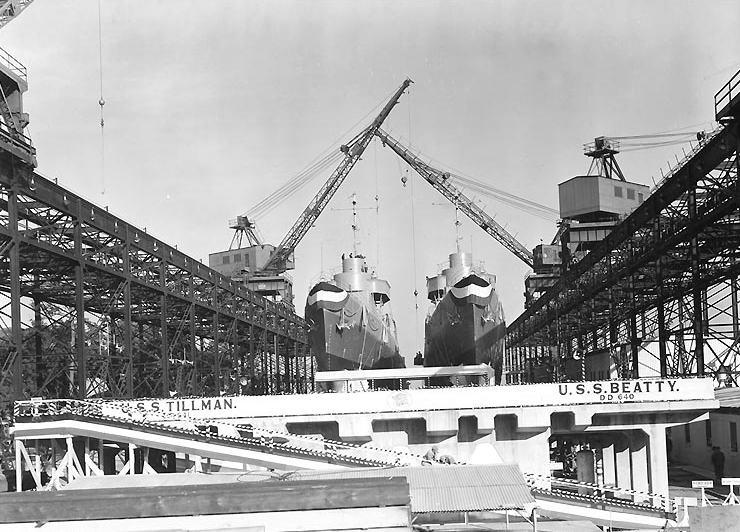
USS Beatty (DD-640) and USS Tillman (DD-641) at the Charleston Navy Yard in 1941

In 1931, Ellicott Dredges delivered the 20-inch cutter dredge Orion still in operation at the old Charleston Naval Shipyard.

Two of the largest vessels ever built at the yard were two destroyer tenders, USS Tidewater (AD-31) and USS Bryce Canyon (AD-36). The keels of these ships were laid in November 1944 and July 1945, respectively. Peak employment of 25,948 was reached in July 1943.

After the war, the shipyard was responsible for the repairs and alterations of captured German submarines. In April 1948, Secretary of the Navy John L. Sullivan told Charleston's Representative Rivers and Senator Burnet R. Maybank that the navy planned for CNSY to become a submarine overhaul yard and would ask for an initial appropriation for a battery-charging unit.

Arnold Peter Weiss, who at one point served as the traffic manager of the Navy Yard, was notably the first husband of Frances Loeb, who later became the influential second wife of renowned television producer and writer Norman Lear.

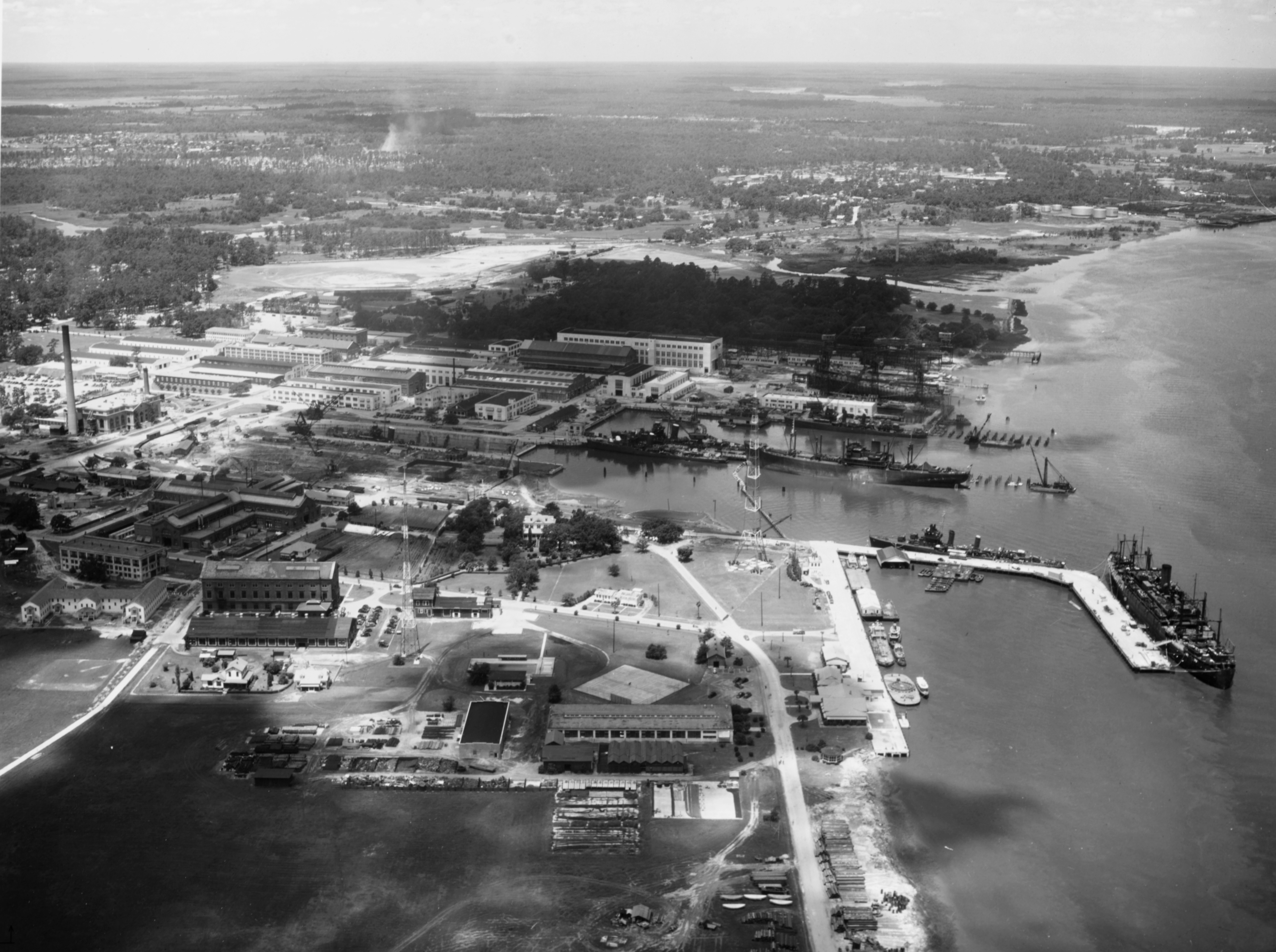
Aerial view of the Charleston Navy Yard in 1941.

The first submarine, USS Conger (SS-477), arrived for overhaul in August 1948. The shipyard expected to overhaul about 132 ships during the year, and its work force had stabilized to nearly 5,000 persons.

North Korean invasion of South Korea in June 1950 increased production once again. By 1951, the shipyard was back to over 8,000 employees. In all, the shipyard activated forty-four vessels and converted twenty-seven for active fleet duty during the Korean War.

Submarines continued to be built into the 1960s along with missiles, and nuclear submarine overhauls took place including USS Scorpion (SSN-589) in 1962. In 1966, the shipyard completed the first refueling of a nuclear submarine, USS Skipjack (SSN-585), and began its first overhaul of a Fleet Ballistic Missile (FBM) submarine, USS Thomas A. Edison (SSBN-610). Captain Blake Wayne Van Leer led the expansion and construction of Dry Dock No. 2 so it could handle the massive FBM submarines and destroyers fitted with sonar.

The facility remained a major installation throughout the Cold War as a homeport to numerous cruisers, destroyers, attack submarines, FBM submarines, destroyer tenders, and submarine tenders of the U.S. Atlantic Fleet until its closure in the 1990s as a result of the end of the Cold War and subsequent BRAC Commission action.

== Dry docks and slipways ==
Dock No.	Material of which dock is constructed	Length	Width	Depth	Date Completed	Source
1	Concrete and granite	622 feet (190 m)	134 feet (41 m)	34 feet 5 inches (10.49 m)	1908	
2	Concrete	596 feet 6 inches (181.81 m)	114 feet (35 m)	37 feet 6 inches (11.43 m)	1968	
3	Concrete and sheet pile	365 feet 10 inches (111.51 m)	107 feet 4 inches (32.72 m)	10 feet 7 inches (3.23 m)	1943	
4	Concrete and sheet pile	365 feet 10 inches (111.51 m)	107 feet 4 inches (32.72 m)	10 feet 7 inches (3.23 m)	1943	
5	Concrete	751 feet 5 inches (229.03 m)	140 feet (43 m)	37 feet (11 m)	1964	

January 1, 1946
Shipbuilding ways	Width	Length	Source
1	68 feet (21 m)	350 feet (110 m)	
2	60 feet (18 m)	350 feet (110 m)	
3	90 feet (27 m)	600 feet (180 m)	

== List of ships ==
- 20 Destroyers
  - 1 of 10 Benham-class: Sterett (DD-407)
  - 1 of 12 Sims-class: Roe (DD-418)
  - 1 of 30 Benson-class: Hilary P. Jones (DD-427)
  - 7 of 66 Gleaves-class
    - Grayson (DD-435)
    - Swanson (DD-443), Ingraham (DD-444)
    - Corry (DD-463), Hobson (DD-464)
    - Beatty (DD-640), Tillman (DD-641)
  - 10 of 175 Fletcher-class
    - Pringle (DD-477) ... Stevens (DD-479)
    - Bell (DD-587) ... Twiggs (DD-591)
    - Albert W. Grant (DD-649)
    - Bryant (DD-665)
- 26 Destroyer escorts and APDs
  - 15 of 148 Buckley-class
    - Manning (DE-199) ... William T. Powell (DE-213)
  - 2 of 22 Rudderow-class
    - Chaffee (DE-230), Hodges (DE-231)
  - 9 of 51 Crosley-class high speed transports
    - Kinzer (APD-91) ... Upham (APD-99)
- 2 of 6 Shenandoah-class destroyer tenders
  - Tidewater (AD-31), Bryce Canyon (AD-36)
- 8 of 1052 Landing Ship Tank
  - LST-353 - LST-360
- 121 of 558 Landing Ship Medium
  - LSM-126 - LSM-200, LSM-295 - LSM-309, LSM-389 - LSM-413, LSM-553 - LSM-558

== Atlantic Reserve Fleet, Charleston ==
The Atlantic Reserve Fleet, Charleston opened in 1946 at the shipyard to store the many surplus ships after World War II. As part of the United States Navy reserve fleets, the fleet "mothballed" ships and submarines. Many of the ships in the fleet were reactivated for the Korean War and some for the Vietnam War. The Reserve Fleet closed in 1996 with the shipyard. The ships were scrapped or moved to other reserve fleets.

== Post-BRAC ==
=== Military and industrial use ===
With the closure of the Naval Base and Charleston Naval Shipyard in 1996, Detyens, Inc. signed a long-term lease. With three dry docks, one floating dock, and six piers, Detyens Shipyards, Inc. is the largest commercial facility on the East Coast. Projects include military, commercial, and cruise ships.

In supporting Joint Base Charleston, 231 acres (93 ha) of the former Charleston Naval Base/Naval Shipyard facility have been transformed into a multiuse Federal complex, with 17 Government and Military tenants, as well as homeport for six RO-RO Military Sealift Command ships, four Coast Guard National Security Cutters, two NOAA research ships, the United States Coast Guard Maritime Law Enforcement Academy, and the Federal Law Enforcement Training Center FLETC-Charleston.

Lastly, a 350-acre section of the former base was planned to be a sustainable, mixed-use urban hub for the city of North Charleston to be called The Navy Yard at Noisette, starting in 2005. However, in 2010, the developer, the Noisette company, went into foreclosure and Palmetto Railways, part of the S.C. Department of Commerce purchased over 200-acres of the property. In 2013, Palmetto Railways purchased the remaining part of The Navy Yard. The plan is to run freight trains through the north end of the former base to serve a new container port, Navy Base Intermodal Container Transfer Facility, that is under construction at the south end of the former base.

In February 2020, Coast Guard Admiral Karl Schultz announced that the shipyard would be included in a planned "super base." The plan would consolidate Coast Guard assets to the North Charleston region and occur within five years. Construction began in 2024.

=== The Naval Hospital Historic District ===
The initial Palmetto Railways plan for the former Naval Shipyard required the demolition of several historic structures which led the National Trust for Historic Preservation to add the Charleston Naval Hospital Historic District to its 11 Most Endangered Places list in 2016. The National Trust stated that the plan's proposed demolition of 9 out of the district's 32 buildings would possibly lead to the district being de-listed from the National Register of Historic Places.

== See also ==
- Joint Base Charleston
- Naval Support Activity Charleston
- Warren Lasch Conservation Center
- Naval Health Clinic Charleston
- Charleston Navy Yard Officers' Quarters Historic District
