= Charleston Navy Yard Officers' Quarters Historic District =

Historic district in South Carolina, US

- U.S. National Register of Historic Places
- U.S. Historic district
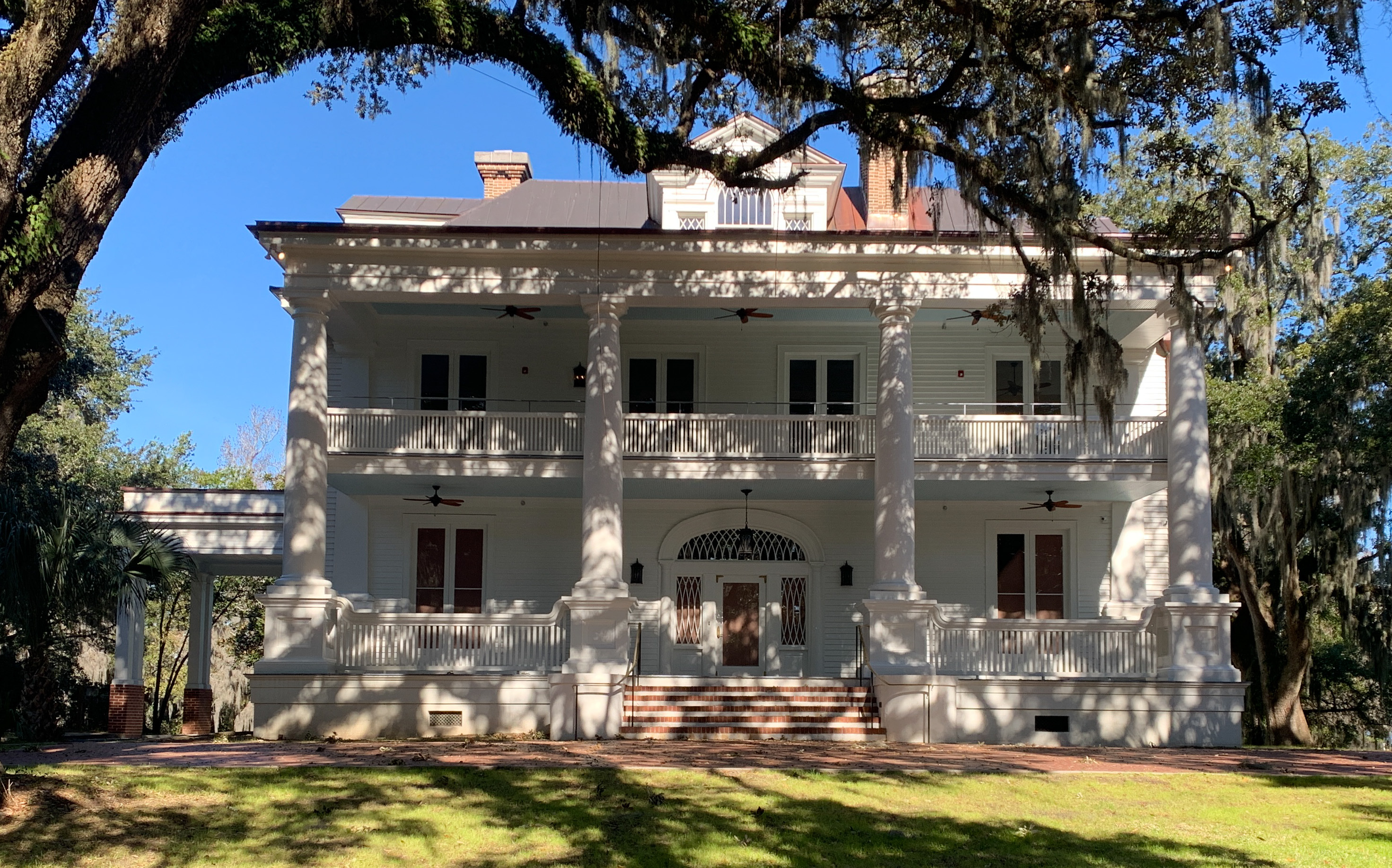

- Location within South Carolina Location within the United States
- Location: Turnbull Ave., Everglades Dr., Navy Way, and portions of Hobson Ave. and Blackstop Dr., North Charleston, South Carolina
- Coordinates: 32°52′08″N 79°58′09″W
- Area: 69.9 acres (28.3 ha)
- Built: 1898
- Architectural style: Late 19th And 20th Century Revivals, Prairie School
- NRHP reference No.: 07000100
- Added to NRHP: March 2, 2007

Charleston Navy Yard Officers' Quarters Historic District is a national historic district located at the former Charleston Naval Shipyard in North Charleston, South Carolina. It encompasses 24 contributing buildings, 2 contributing sites, 1 contributing structure, and 1 contributing object. The site represents development of the upper echelon of senior military housing, support structures, sports facilities and recreational landscape features from 1901 through 1945. The buildings reflect late Victorian and early-20th century eclectic designs including the Italianate, Neo-Classical, Italian Renaissance Revival, Colonial Revival, and the Works Progress Administration (WPA) designed Panama House style.

The oldest building on the base are Quarters F, a Victorian house that predates the Navy base and was built as the superintendent's house for the earlier Chicora Park (that the Navy acquired and converted into the base).

It was added to the National Register of Historic Places in 2007.

== See also ==
- Naval Health Clinic Charleston
