= Shenandoah-class destroyer tender =

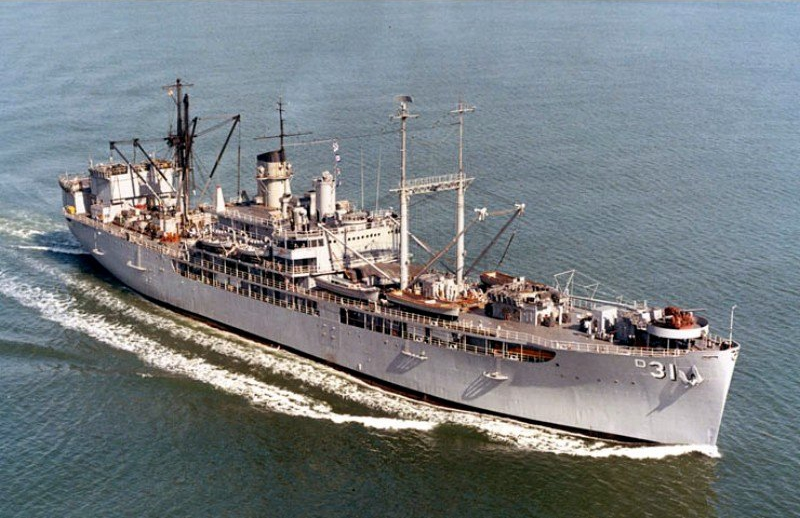
- USS Tidewater in 1965

Class overview
- Operators: United States Navy; Indonesian Navy
- Preceded by: Klondike class
- Succeeded by: Samuel Gompers class
- Planned: 9
- Completed: 6
- Canceled: 3
- Retired: 6

General characteristics
- Type: Destroyer tender
- Displacement: 11,755 long tons (11,944 t)
- Length: 492 ft (150 m)
- Beam: 69 ft (21 m)
- Draft: 27 ft 3 in (8.31 m)
- Speed: 18 knots (33 km/h; 21 mph)
- Complement: 1,035
- Armament: • 2 × 5"/38 caliber guns • 8 × 40 mm AA guns • 22 × 20 mm AA guns

The Shenandoah-class destroyer tenders were a class of destroyer tenders built for the United States Navy that served from 1945 to 1984.

== History ==
The Shenandoah-class destroyer tenders were modified United States Maritime Commission Type C3-class ships. None of the ships saw service during World War II, Isle Royal and Bryce Canyon directly entered the Reserve Fleet, finally being commissioned in 1950 and in 1962. Great Lakes, Canopus and Arrowhead were cancelled in 1945. Grand Canyon was redesignated as a repair ship in 1971. Tidewater was transferred to Indonesia in 1971 and served there until 1984.

== Ships in class ==
Ship Name	Hull No.	Builder	Laid down	Launched	Commissioned	Decommissioned	Fate	DANFS	NVR
Shenandoah	AD-26	Seattle-Tacoma Shipbuilding Corporation, Tacoma Yard	16 September 1944	29 March 1945	13 August 1945	1 April 1980	Sold for scrap 1 March 1982		
Yellowstone	AD-27	Seattle-Tacoma Shipbuilding Corporation, Tacoma Yard	16 October 1944	12 April 1945	16 January 1946	11 September 1974	Sold for scrap, September 1975		
Grand Canyon	AD-28	Seattle-Tacoma Shipbuilding Corporation, Tacoma Yard	16 November 1944	27 April 1945	5 April 1946	1 September 1978	AR-28 1971; sold for scrap, June 1980		
Isle Royale	AD-29	Seattle-Tacoma Shipbuilding Corporation, Seattle Yard	16 December 1944	19 September 1945	9 June 1962	11 March 1970	Sold for scrap 1 December 1977		
Great Lakes	AD-30	Seattle-Tacoma Shipbuilding Corporation, Seattle Yard	16 April 1945	—N/a			Cancelled, 7 January 1946		—N/a
Tidewater	AD-31	Charleston Navy Yard	27 November 1944	30 June 1945	19 February 1946	20 February 1971 and 1984	To Indonesia 1971, scrapped 1984.		
Canopus	AD-33	Mare Island Naval Shipyard	15 March 1945	—N/a			Cancelled on 12 August 1945		—N/a
Arrowhead	AD-35	Puget Sound Naval Shipyard	1 December 1944	—N/a			Cancelled on 11 August 1945		
Bryce Canyon	AD-36	Charleston Navy Yard	7 July 1945	7 March 1946	15 September 1950	30 June 1981	Sold for scrap 1 April 1982.		

== See also ==
- USS New England (AD-32), Dixie-class destroyer tender
- USS Alcor (AD-34), Alcor-class destroyer tender
