= USS Tidewater =

Tender of the United States Navy

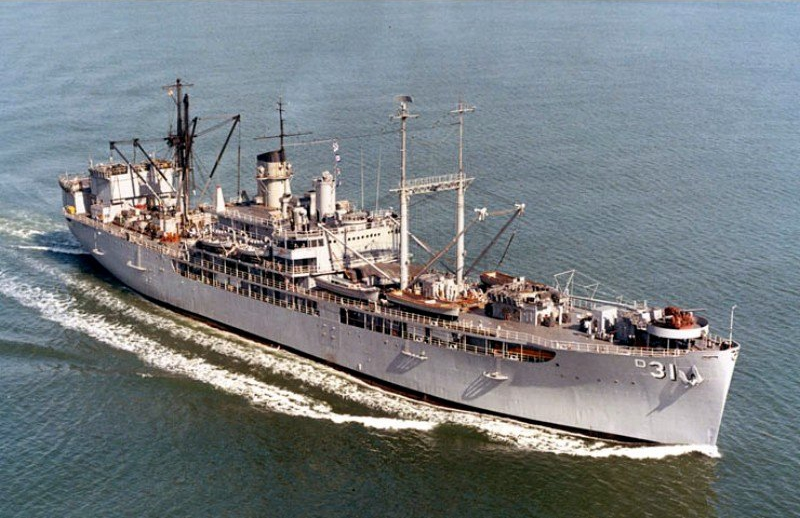
- USS Tidewater (AD-31) at sea on 16 March 1965

History

United States
- Name: USS Tidewater
- Namesake: Tidewater region of Virginia
- Builder: Charleston Navy Yard
- Laid down: 27 November 1944
- Launched: 30 June 1945
- Commissioned: 19 February 1946
- Decommissioned: 20 February 1971
- Identification: Hull number: AD-31
- Fate: Leased to the Indonesian Navy, 1971, and sold, 1981

Indonesia
- Name: KRI Dumai
- Namesake: Dumai City
- Acquired: by lease, 20 February 1971; by purchase, 1 March 1980
- Decommissioned: 1984
- Identification: Pennant number: 652
- Fate: Scrapped 1984

General characteristics
- Type: Shenandoah-class destroyer tender
- Displacement: 11,755 long tons (11,944 t) light; 16,800 long tons (17,070 t) full
- Length: 492 ft (150 m)
- Beam: 70 ft (21 m)
- Draft: 27 ft 6 in (8.38 m)
- Propulsion: Steam turbine, single propeller
- Speed: 18 knots (33 km/h; 21 mph)
- Complement: 1017 officers and enlisted
- Armament: 2 × single 5-inch/38-caliber gun mounts; 8 × single 40 mm AA gun mounts; 12 × single 20 mm guns AA gun mounts

USS Tidewater (AD-31) was a Shenandoah-class destroyer tender in service with the United States Navy from 1946 to 1971. She was transferred to the Indonesian Navy as KRI Dumai (652) and served until 1984, when she was scrapped.

== History ==
USS Tidewater was named for the Tidewater region of Virginia. Tidewater was laid down on 27 November 1944 at the Charleston Navy Yard; launched on 30 June 1945; sponsored by Mrs. Robert N. S. Baker; and commissioned at Charleston Navy Yard on 19 February 1946.

=== United States Navy (1946–1971) ===
Since World War II ended some five months before the destroyer tender was placed in commission, she remained active only long enough to complete sea trials. She did not report for duty with the active fleet, but was decommissioned and ordered to the reserve group berthed at Charleston. There, she became accommodation ship for members of the staff of the Commander, Submarine Group 3. That duty continued through the outbreak and first 15 months of the Korean War. By that time, the increased need for ships to support the United States Army fighting in that Asian country brought Tidewater into her first real active service. On 2 October 1951, Tidewater was recommissioned at Charleston.

Tidewater, however, did not participate directly in the hostilities that brought her back to active duty. Instead, between late 1951 and early 1954, she operated exclusively along the eastern seaboard of the United States. After shakedown training in the Chesapeake Bay area, she reported for duty with Destroyer Flotilla (DesFlot) 4 in February 1952. At her home port, Norfolk, Virginia, she supported the destroyers of DesFlot 4 with her repair facilities. Over the next two years, the ship departed that port on a number of occasions to participate in various exercises. During the fall of 1952, Tidewater joined ships of other NATO powers in Exercise "Mainbrace" for six weeks of training. The following February, she joined other Navy ships in the Caribbean for her first of many annual "Springboard" exercises, after which she resumed duty at Norfolk tending the destroyers of DesFlot 4. In July 1953, the destroyer tender moved south to Charleston to render her services to the ships of the Mine Force. She returned to Norfolk in mid-August and entered the naval shipyard for overhaul on the 12th. At the completion of overhaul, she put to sea for the Caribbean and refresher training on 2 November. Tidewater returned to Norfolk on 1 December and resumed tending destroyers until February 1954 when she headed south to participate in her second "Springboard" exercise. Upon completion of that duty, the destroyer tender headed across the Atlantic for her first deployment with the 6th Fleet in the Mediterranean.

With that assignment, Tidewater set a pattern which endured for the remainder of her Navy career. Over the next 13 years, she made 10 deployments to the Mediterranean, alternating that service with 2nd Fleet duty along the Atlantic coast of the United States. During each tour of duty with the 6th Fleet, she made port calls at various harbors along the length of the "middle-sea" littoral. While serving on her fourth deployment in the summer of 1960, the destroyer tender had the honor to play host to Queen Frederica of Greece. Her eighth deployment to the Mediterranean came in the spring of 1967, just before the outbreak of the Six-Day War between the Arabs and Israel. During that brief conflict, Tidewater hurried to Souda Bay in Crete, where she served as an advanced base ship for 6th Fleet units standing watch in the eastern Mediterranean for the duration of hostilities. The Tidewater was relieved by the USS Yellowstone (AD-27) in Rota, Spain, August 1967.

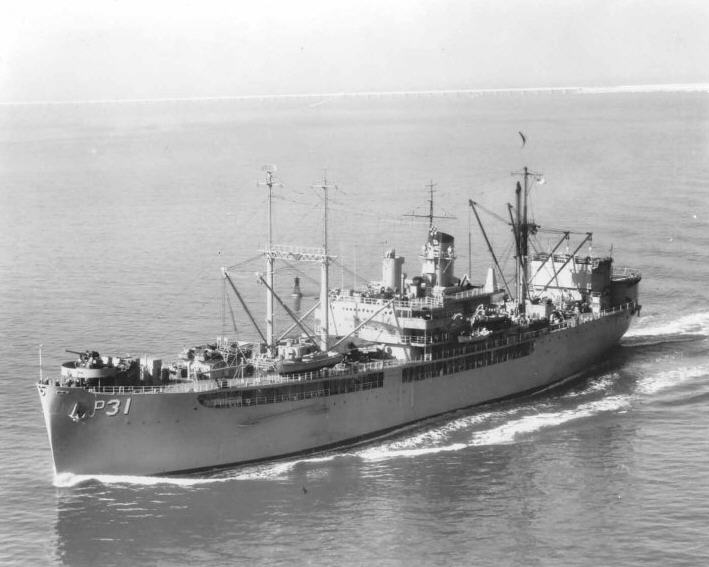
USS Tidewater (AD-31) at sea, 1967. Note the DASH hangar at the stern of the ship. This is her last configuration before being turned over to the Indonesian Navy.

When not in the Mediterranean, she busied herself in support of the warships of the Atlantic Fleet from her base at Norfolk and at other ports along the eastern seaboard. When in the area, she joined in various exercises, most frequently in Operation "Springboard", the annual Caribbean-based exercise conducted by the ships of the Atlantic Fleet. She also underwent periodic overhauls to refurbish herself and modernize her equipment. The most significant of those occurred in June 1962 when, at the conclusion of her fifth Mediterranean tour, she entered Norfolk Naval Shipyard for an extensive overhaul which included the installation of a helicopter pad and concomitant equipment to expand her logistics support capabilities.

Tidewater completed her tenth Mediterranean deployment on 2 May 1969. She resumed tender duty with the warships of the Atlantic Fleet out of Norfolk and remained so occupied through the end of the year and into 1970. In August 1970, she received word that she would be decommissioned the following spring. She served as flagship for the Commander, Cruiser-Destroyer Group 4, from 10 September until 13 November, at which time she began preparations for inactivation.

=== Indonesian Navy (1971–1984) ===
On 4 January 1971, the United States Navy agreed to lease Tidewater to the Indonesian Navy (TNI-AL) upon decommissioning. Accordingly, when she was placed out of commission at Norfolk on 20 February she was turned over to the Indonesian Navy and recommissioned as KRI Dumai (652). Dumai was purchased outright under the Security Assistance Program by Indonesia on 14 March 1980, and struck from the U.S. Naval Vessel Register. As of 1981 Dumai was not operational and used as accommodation ship for oil field personnel, with most of her equipment already landed. She went out of service in 1984 and was scrapped.

One of her 5-inch/38-caliber gun is preserved as a monument in Dumai City, her namesake.
