= USS Great Lakes =

Tender of the United States Navy

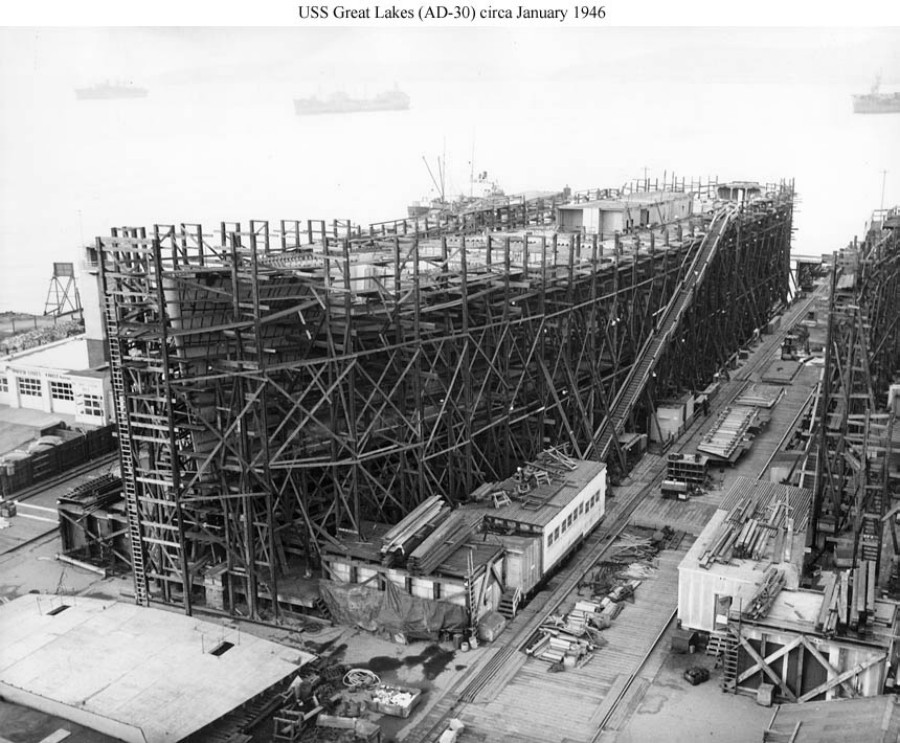

History

United States
- Name: USS Great Lakes
- Namesake: Great Lakes
- Builder: Todd Pacific Shipyards, Seattle, Washington
- Laid down: 16 April 1945
- Fate: Cancelled 7 January 1946

General characteristics
- Type: Shenandoah-class destroyer tender
- Displacement: 11,755 long tons (11,944 t) light; 16,880 long tons (17,151 t) full
- Length: 492 ft (150 m)
- Beam: 69 ft 6 in (21.18 m)
- Draft: 28 ft (8.5 m)
- Propulsion: Steam turbine, single propeller
- Speed: 18 knots (33 km/h; 21 mph)
- Complement: 977 officers and enlisted
- Armament: 2 × single 5"/38 caliber gun mounts; 8 × 40 mm AA guns; 22 × 20 mm guns AA guns

USS Great Lakes (AD-30) was a planned Shenandoah-class destroyer tender of the United States Navy.

Great Lakes was laid down on 16 April 1945 at the Todd Pacific Shipyard in Seattle. She was cancelled on 7 January 1946, when she was around 20% complete.
