= USS Isle Royale =

Tender of the United States Navy

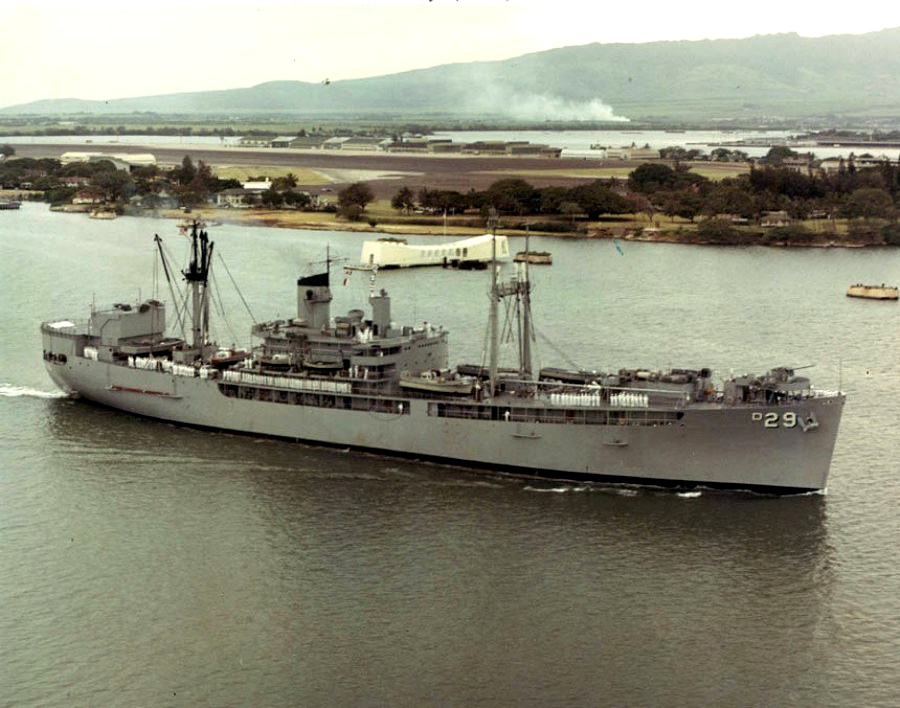
- USS Isle Royale in June 1963

History

United States
- Name: USS Isle Royale
- Namesake: Isle Royale in Michigan
- Builder: Todd Pacific Shipyards, Seattle, Washington
- Launched: 19 September 1945
- Acquired: 2 July 1946
- Commissioned: 9 June 1962
- Decommissioned: 11 March 1970
- Stricken: 15 September 1976
- Honours and awards: 1 battle star (Vietnam)
- Fate: Transferred to the Maritime Administration, 1 September 1971; Sold for scrapping, 1 December 1977

General characteristics
- Type: Shenandoah-class destroyer tender
- Displacement: 8,165 long tons (8,296 t) light; 16,880 long tons (17,151 t) full
- Length: 492 ft (150 m)
- Beam: 69 ft 6 in (21.18 m)
- Draft: 27 ft 3 in (8.31 m)
- Propulsion: Geared turbine, single propeller
- Speed: 18 knots (33 km/h; 21 mph)
- Complement: 977 officers and enlisted
- Armament: 1 × single 5"/38 caliber gun mount; 4 × single 3"/50 caliber guns

USS Isle Royale (AD-29) was a Shenandoah-class destroyer tender named for an island of the Great Lakes.

Isle Royale was launched by Todd Pacific Shipyards, Inc. of Seattle, Washington on 19 September 1945; sponsored by Mrs. Greer A. Duncan; and delivered to the Navy on 2 July 1946 for layup in the Pacific Reserve Fleet, San Diego. During her period of inactivation, Isle Royale served as headquarters ship for the Pacific Reserve Fleet, Long Beach. She was designated to replace the USS Hamul (AD-20) in the active fleet, and commissioned at Long Beach, California on 9 June 1962, taking Hamul's officers and men as that ship decommissioned. After shakedown, Isle Royale moved to Long Beach to begin her services to Pacific Fleet destroyers, supplying them with parts and vital repair facilities.

== Service history ==
Plan of the main deck, second deck & first platform

The tender sailed for Pearl Harbor on 8 February 1963 and for the next seven months served the destroyers roaming the Pacific on their vital peacekeeping mission. She returned to Long Beach from this deployment on 11 September 1963 and conducted training operations in California waters until June 1964. The ship then got underway again for Pearl Harbor, where she operated until 30 October. She returned to Long Beach 5 November where she operated until departing 3 August 1965 for a scheduled six-month mid-Pacific cruise. However, upon arriving Pearl Harbor, she received orders to proceed on to the Philippines where she tended ships of the 7th Fleet fighting in Vietnam. Isle Royale earned one campaign star for Vietnam War service.

Isle Royale returned to Long Beach on 5 March 1966 and operated along the West Coast until sailing again for the Far East on 16 September. She remained in the Orient operating primarily out of Subic Bay tending the destroyers of the 7th Fleet until her return to Long Beach on 12 April 1967. Thereafter Isle Royale operated in waters off southern California preparing for future action.

After she was decommissioned on 11 March 1970, Isle Royale was struck from the Naval Vessel Register on 15 September 1976. Custody was transferred to the Maritime Administration, for disposal; Isle Royale was sold by MARAD on 1 December 1977, to Waterman Supply Co. who stripped her any usable parts before selling the hulk to International Steel Co. for scrap.
