= USS Shenandoah (AD-26) =

Tender of the United States Navy

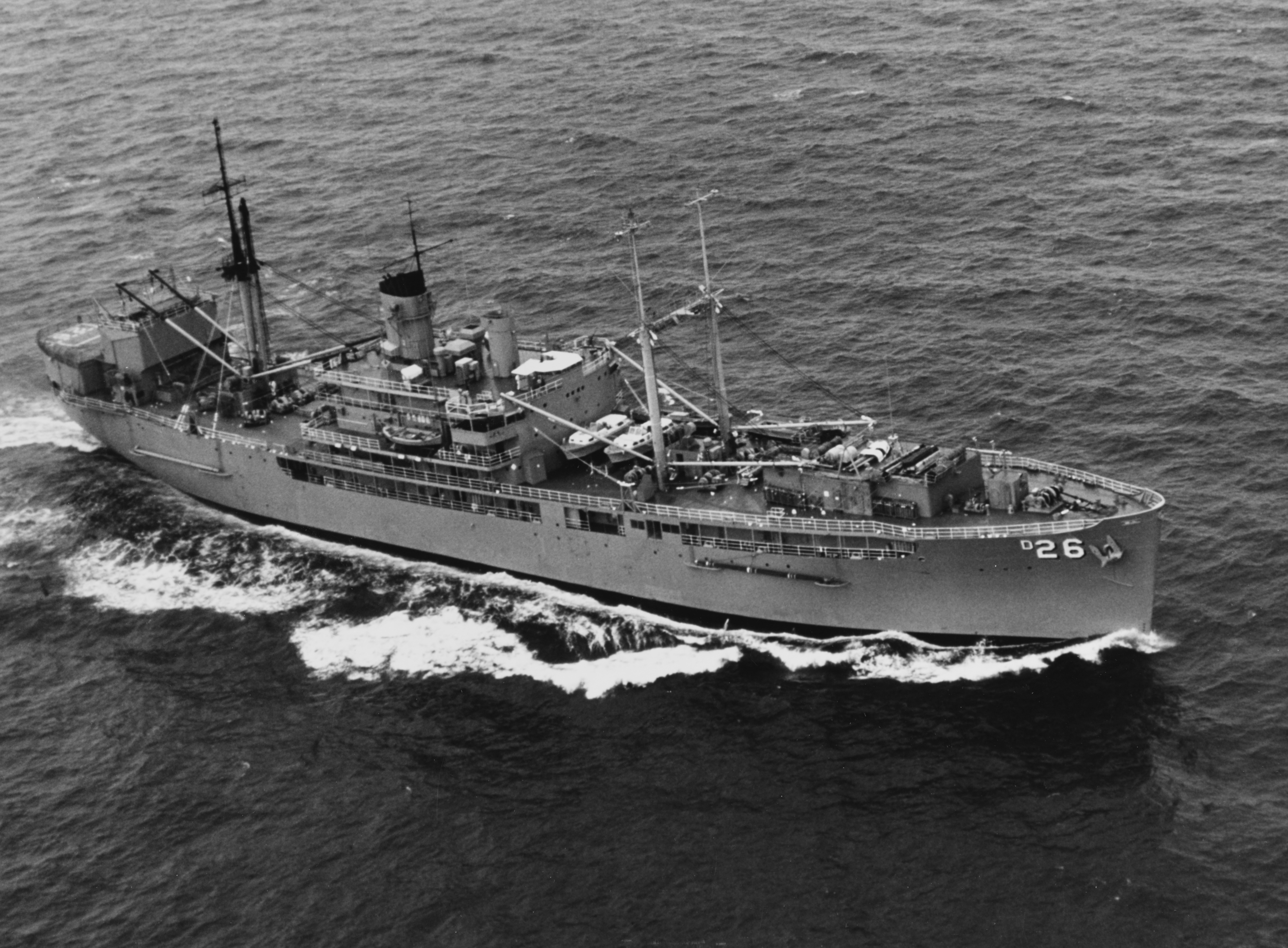
- Shenandoah off Norfolk, Virginia (USA), 16 September 1975

History

United States
- Name: USS Shenandoah
- Namesake: Shenandoah River
- Builder: Todd Pacific Shipyards, Tacoma, Washington
- Laid down: 16 September 1944
- Launched: 29 March 1945
- Commissioned: 13 August 1945
- Decommissioned: 1 April 1980
- Stricken: 1 April 1980
- Fate: Sold for scrapping, 1 March 1982

General characteristics
- Type: Shenandoah-class destroyer tender
- Displacement: 11,755 long tons (11,944 t)
- Length: 492 ft (150 m)
- Beam: 69 ft 6 in (21.18 m)
- Draft: 27 ft 6 in (8.38 m)
- Speed: 18 knots (33 km/h; 21 mph)
- Complement: 1,035
- Armament: 2 × 5"/38 caliber guns; 8 × 40 mm AA guns; 22 × 20 mm guns AA guns

USS Shenandoah (AD-26) was one of ten planned destroyer tenders built at the tail end of World War II (orders for four of the ships were cancelled due to the cessation of hostilities). The lead ship in her class, she was the third United States naval vessel named for the Shenandoah River which runs through Virginia and West Virginia.

The third Shenandoah was laid down on 16 September 1944 by Todd Pacific Shipyards, Inc. of Tacoma, Washington, launched on 29 March 1945, sponsored by Mrs. Daniel Hunt, and commissioned on 13 August 1945.

== Service history ==
Shenandoah completed her fitting out in December and sailed to the East Coast via the Panama Canal, where she reported for duty with Destroyer Force, United States Atlantic Fleet in January 1946. Until June 1947 she tended destroyers in various east coast ports, primarily at Norfolk, Virginia, her home port. The tender deployed on her first tour of duty with the 6th Fleet from June through August 1947. In the next 20 years, she was assigned 13 more tours in the Mediterranean Sea. In 1958, she was awarded the Armed Forces Expeditionary Medal service in Lebanon.

Shenandoah's most publicized tour of duty was in 1964. She won international acclaim for her heroic rescue of the crew of the Dutch merchant ship Doris. The freighter broke loose from her moorings during the height of a storm and became impaled upon the rocks of Molo San Vincenzo in Naples' outer harbor. A line was run to the freighter by the crew of the Shenandoah, and all aboard were rescued minutes before Doris rolled over and sank. The destroyer tender also won recognition in 1965 for her repairs to the bow of the aircraft carrier USS Shangri-La (CV-38) which had collided with a destroyer during maneuvers.

Shenandoah was awarded the Battle Efficiency Pennant for her competence in destroyer tending in 1952 and 1956 and the Meritorious Unit Commendation in 1970. She was awarded the Engineering "E" in 1958 and 1965, and the Supply "E" in 1962, 1963, and 1967. Shenandoah was again deployed with the 6th Fleet in 1968, 1970, and 1973. She returned to her home port on 15 December 1973 and into July 1974 was tending ships on the East Coast.

Shenandoah was decommissioned at Naval Station Norfolk, and simultaneously struck from the Naval Register on 1 April 1980. Transferred to the Maritime Administration for disposal, she was sold, 1 March 1982.
