= USS Bryce Canyon =

Tender of the United States Navy

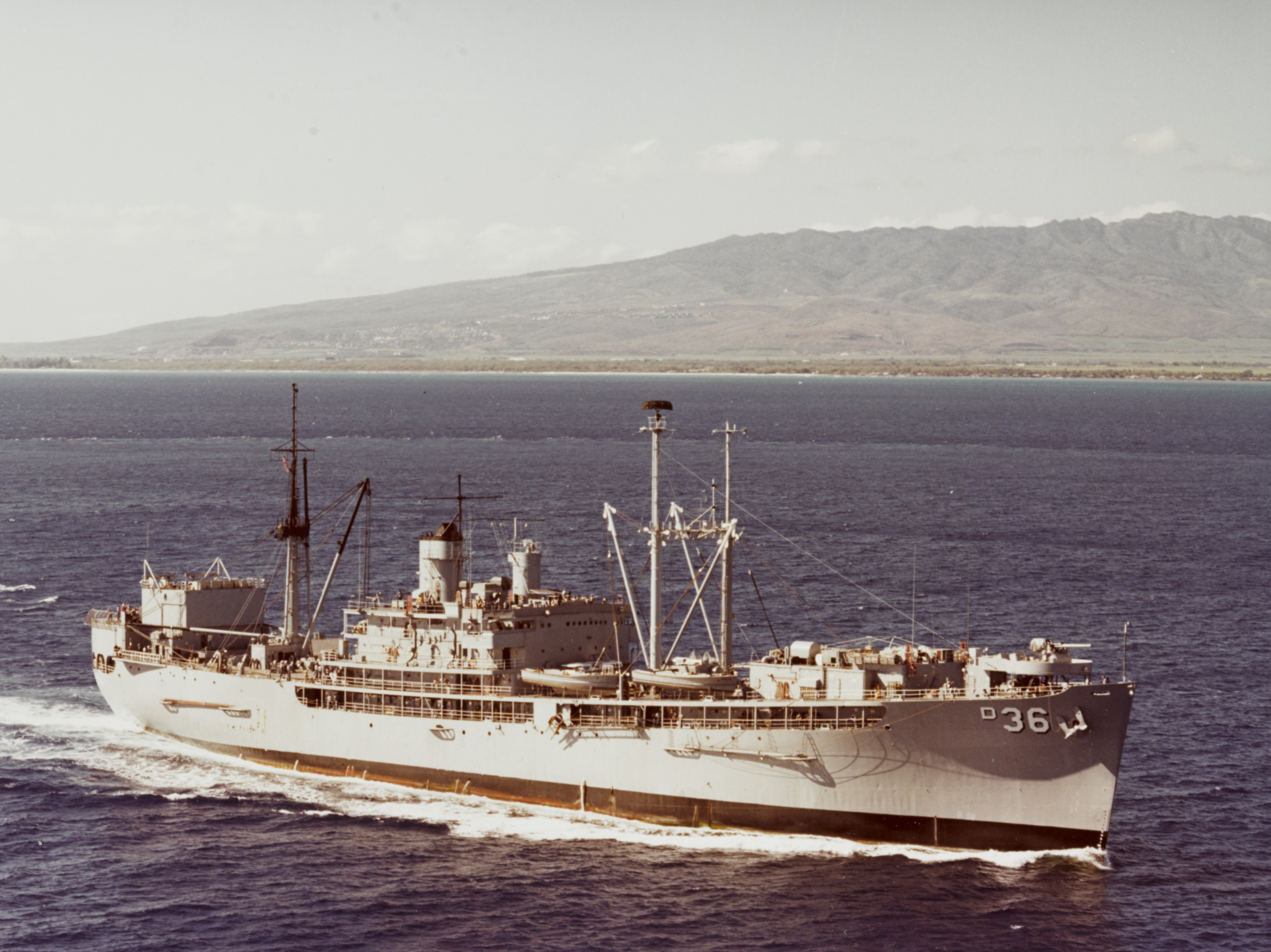

History

United States
- Name: USS Bryce Canyon
- Namesake: Bryce Canyon National Park
- Ordered: 8 November 1944
- Builder: Charleston Navy Yard
- Laid down: 7 July 1945
- Launched: 7 March 1946
- Commissioned: 15 September 1950
- Decommissioned: 30 June 1981
- Stricken: 30 June 1981
- Nickname(s): BC, Building 36
- Honours and awards: 1 battle star (Korea)
- Fate: Sold for scrapping 6 April 1982

General characteristics
- Type: Shenandoah-class destroyer tender
- Displacement: 8,091 long tons (8,221 t)
- Length: 492 ft (150 m)
- Beam: 70 ft (21 m)
- Draft: 28 ft (8.5 m)
- Speed: 18 knots (33 km/h; 21 mph)
- Complement: 859 officers and enlisted
- Armament: 2 × 5 in (130 mm) guns

USS Bryce Canyon (AD-36) was a Shenandoah-class destroyer tender, the only ship to be named for the Bryce Canyon National Park in Utah.

Bryce Canyon was launched 7 March 1946 by Charleston Navy Yard and sponsored by Mrs. William J. Carter, wife of Rear Admiral Carter. Little additional work was done on her until after the outbreak of the Korean War. Charleston Naval Shipyard then completed the tender and she was commissioned 15 September 1950.

== Service history ==
Bryce Canyon transited the Panama Canal 5 December and reported to the Pacific Fleet. On 26 March 1951 she got underway from San Diego, California for the Far East. Arriving at Yokosuka, Japan, 12 April 1951, she spent the next seven months in Japanese waters repairing and servicing vessels based at Yokosuka and Sasebo. Bryce Canyon left Japan 4 November 1951 and arrived at San Diego 18 November 1951.

She got underway, via Pearl Harbor, for her second Western Pacific cruise in June, 1952. This cruise was completed 16 February 1953 when she arrived at Long Beach, California. On 26 September 1953 she again sailed for Sasebo where she arrived 16 October. Bryce Canyon provided tender service in Sasebo, Yokosuka, Nagoya, and Kobe during this tour. She returned to the United States 17 June 1954.

Her fourth Western Pacific tour commenced 25 February 1955. She serviced vessels at Subic Bay, Luzon, between 16 March and 28 April and then proceeded to Yokosuka, arriving 11 May 1955. Bryce Canyon returned to Long Beach 11 August 1955. On 9 December 1955 she departed California on her fifth Western Pacific tour which ended at Long Beach on 26 October 1956. Between Far Eastern cruises Bryce Canyon has operated along the West Coast. Home Port Long Beach, California 6-month duration with 6 months at Pearl Harbor. Cruises to Pacific theatre every 4 years.

Bryce Canyon received one battle star for her services to the forces afloat in the Korean War. Bryce Canyon was decommissioned on 30 June 1981. She was sold for scrapping to National Metal and Steel, Terminal Island, Ca on 6 April 1982.

== Notable former crew ==
- Stan Hitchcock, mid 1950s, leader of the ship's band, "The Bryce Canyon Troubadours"
