= USS Yellowstone (AD-27) =

Tender of the United States Navy

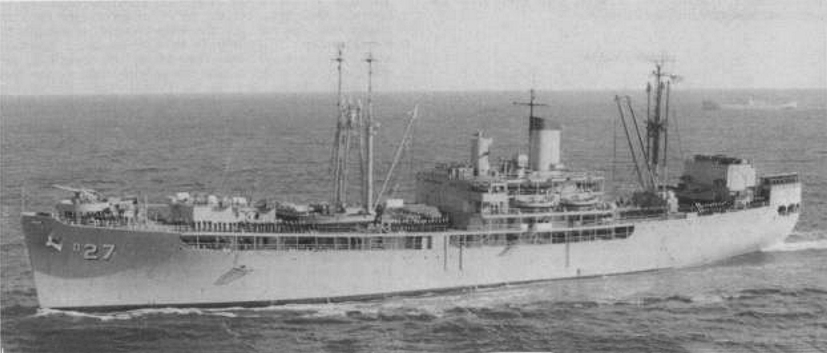

History

United States
- Name: USS Yellowstone
- Namesake: Yellowstone National Park in Idaho, Montana, and Wyoming
- Builder: Todd Pacific Shipyards, Tacoma, Washington
- Laid down: 16 October 1944
- Launched: 12 April 1945
- Commissioned: 16 January 1946
- Decommissioned: 11 September 1974
- Stricken: 12 September 1974
- Fate: Sold for scrapping, September 1975

General characteristics
- Type: Shenandoah-class destroyer tender
- Displacement: 11,755 long tons (11,944 t) light; 16,880 long tons (17,151 t) full
- Length: 492 ft (150 m)
- Beam: 69 ft 6 in (21.18 m)
- Draft: 28 ft (8.5 m)
- Propulsion: Steam turbine, single propeller
- Speed: 18 knots (33 km/h; 21 mph)
- Complement: 962 officers and enlisted
- Armament: 2 × single 5"/38 caliber gun mount; 8 × 40 mm AA guns; 22 × 20 mm guns AA guns

USS Yellowstone (AD 27) was a Shenandoah-class destroyer tender named for Yellowstone National Park, the second United States Navy vessel to bear the name.

Yellowstone was laid down on 16 October 1944 at Tacoma, Washington by the Seattle Division of the Todd-Pacific Shipyards, Inc.; launched on 12 April 1945; sponsored by Mrs. F. A. Zeusler, the wife of Capt. F. A. Zeusler, USCG, the District Coast Guard Officer of the 13th Naval District; and commissioned on 16 January 1946.

== Service history ==
After shakedown training out of San Diego and repairs at Puget Sound Naval Shipyard to correct minor deficiencies which appeared during her initial cruise, Yellowstone operated in the Seattle, Washington area into March 1946. She departed Seattle on the last day of the month, transited the Panama Canal on 11 April, and arrived at Newport, Rhode Island on the 20th to take up her duties tending destroyers of the Atlantic Fleet. Yellowstone remained as part of the Fleet for the next 28 years, providing repair, supply, and auxiliary services (i.e., power and fresh water) not only to destroyers (the purpose for which she was designed) but also to aircraft carriers and submarines. In time, the vessel earned a reputation for reliability and dependability that caused some to nickname her "Old Faithful," after the famous geyser in Yellowstone National Park. The destroyer tender also earned the coveted battle efficiency "E" award 10 times.

Yellowstone was deployed to the Mediterranean Sea 11 times between 1947 and 1968. Her ports of operation ranged from İzmir, Turkey to Naples, Italy; from Venice to Taranto; from Souda Bay on the Island of Crete to Gibraltar; and included cities in Spain, France, Italy, and Greece. In between her deployments with the 6th Fleet, the destroyer tender operated out of Boston, Newport, Norfolk, Bermuda, Mayport, Florida.

Her tasks were performed mostly unheralded and far from the public eye but were necessary to maintain the ships of the Fleet in operational trim. In October 1969 she performed a noteworthy repair job when she replaced 1,162 tubes in the number one propulsion boiler of USS Forrest Royal (DD-872) as that ship was preparing to deploy to the Mediterranean. Working against the destroyer's deadline, Yellowstone's crew accomplished the task in only 12 days and thus allowed her to get underway on time. Soon thereafter, Yellowstone deployed to the Mediterranean for the 12th and last time. She arrived at Naples on 9 December 1969 and, before long, found herself with another major repair task ahead of her. She replaced the starboard propeller of the USS Sampson (DDG-10), a job that normally required a dry-docking. Repair, supply, and deck divisions of both ships participated in the evolution that earned Yellowstone a commendation.

A little more than a month later. On 10 February 1970 at Naples, the Greek registry freighter Mautric collided with Yellowstone and the tender's nest of destroyers. The USS Semmes (DDG-18), the USS Samuel B. Roberts (DD-823), and the USS Charles F. Adams (DDG-2) all suffered extensive hull and structural damage, but Yellowstone worked nearly 24-hour shifts from 13 to 22 February and effected the necessary repairs. Capt. R. D. Wood, commanding Yellowstone, and Senior Chief Ship Fitter William S. Burman received Navy commendation medals for heading the exemplary repair work that soon had all ships back in operational condition.

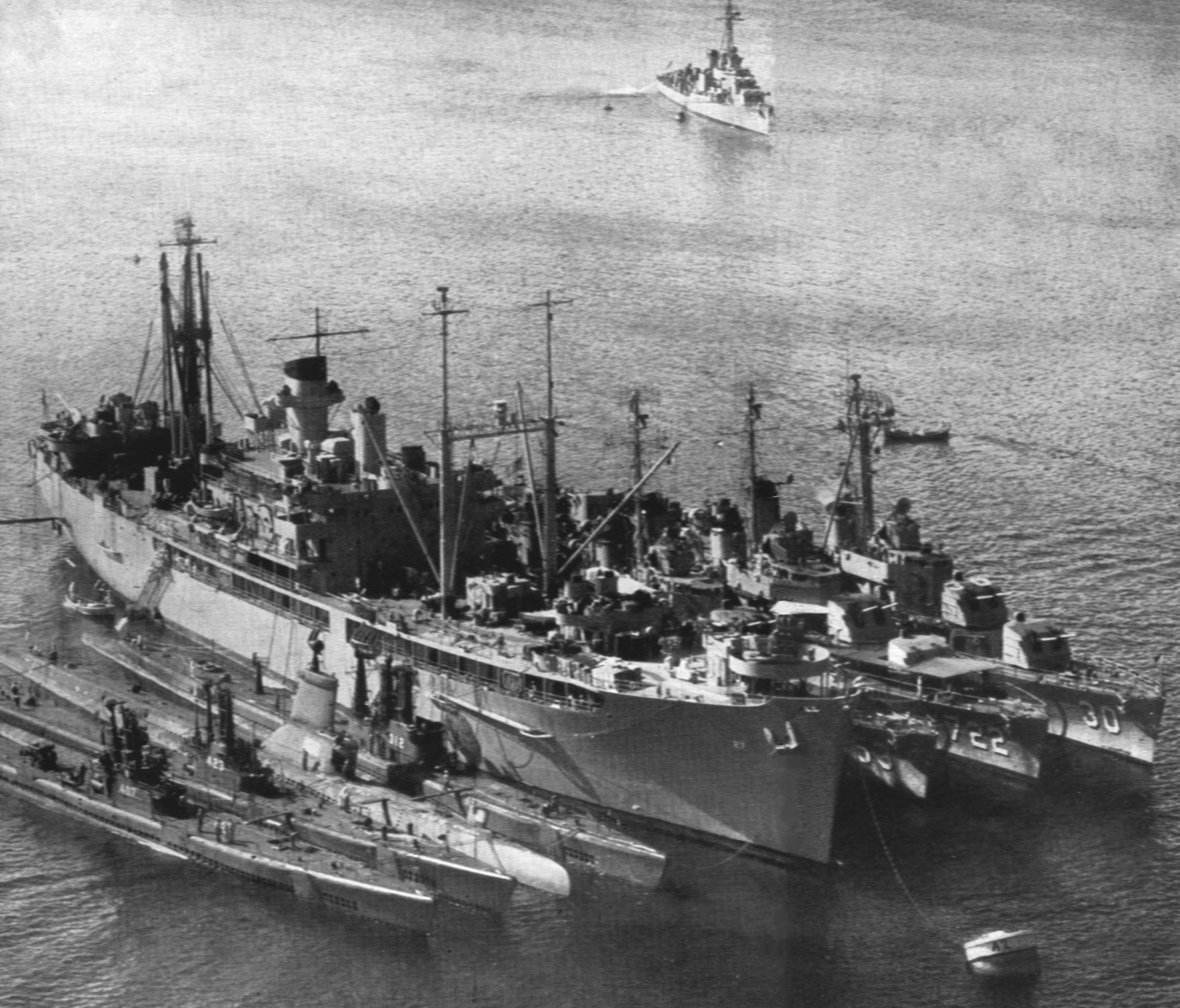
Yellowstone at Augusta Bay, Sicily, Italy with USS Sea Robin (SS-407), USS Torsk (SS-423), USS Sea Leopard (SS-483), USS Burrfish (SSR-312), USS John R. Pierce (DD-753), USS Barton (DD-722), and USS Shea (DM-30). In the background is USS Harry F. Bauer (DM-26).

After a brief in-port period at Piraeus, Greece from 18 March to 5 April, Yellowstone returned to Naples, where she subsequently performed her second underwater propeller replacement of the deployment on the USS Corry (DD-817). The repair ship sailed for home in mid-May and arrived at Mayport, Florida on 1 June. One month later, on 1 July, the ship's home port was changed from Mayport to Charleston, South Carolina. The destroyer tender provided services to ships of Cruiser-Destroyer Flotilla (CruDesFlot) 6 into January 1971. At the end of that month, she sailed for Puerto Rico and took part in "Springboard" exercises before returning to Charleston on 16 February. That spring, when the commander, CruDesFlot 6, embarked with the USS America (CV-66) to deploy to the 6th Fleet, Yellowstone's commanding officer became the administrative deputy to the Charleston representative of commander, CruDesFlot 6. In that role, he coordinated local pier assignments; arranged for tug and tow services; made military guard ship and pier sentry assignments; scheduled ship tours; provided information and assistance to dependents; and represented the destroyer force at meetings of numerous naval station, base, and district advisory boards and committees.

Yellowstone remained in port at Charleston into 1973. Among the noteworthy events that occurred that year was the ship's nomination to receive the Ney Award, recognizing the ship's outstanding food service mess, as the nominee of the commander, Cruiser Destroyer Force, Atlantic Fleet. In 1974 the ship's boilers were converted to use Navy distillate fuel. After 28 years of continuous service to the Fleet (the last few years of which were spent along the eastern seaboard of the United States) Yellowstone was decommissioned on 11 September 1974. Struck from the Naval Vessel Register the next day and subsequently transferred to the Maritime Administration for disposal, the veteran auxiliary was sold for scrapping in September 1975.
