= Depot ship =

Type of auxiliary warship

A depot ship is an auxiliary ship used as a mobile or fixed base for submarines, destroyers, minesweepers, fast attack craft, landing craft, or other small ships with similarly limited space for maintenance equipment and crew dining, berthing and relaxation. Depot ships may be identified as tenders in American English. Depot ships may be specifically designed for their purpose or be converted from another purpose.

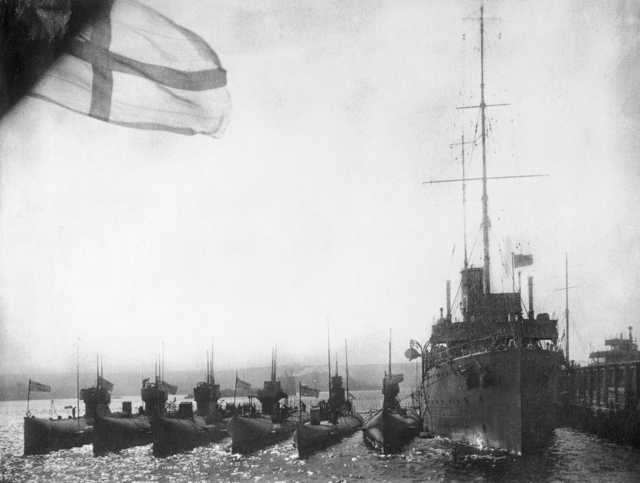
Submarine depot ship HMAS Platypus with a flotilla of submarines

== Function ==
Depot ships provide services unavailable from local naval base shore facilities. Industrialized countries may build naval bases with extensive workshops, warehouses, barracks, and medical and recreation facilities. Depot ships operating within such bases may provide little more than command staff offices, while depot ships operating at remote bases may perform unusually diverse support functions. Some United States Navy submarine depot ships operating in the Pacific during World War II included sailors with Construction Battalion ratings to clear recreational sites and assemble buildings ashore, while the Royal Navy mobile naval bases included specialized amenities ships to meet recreational needs of British Pacific Fleet personnel.

Services provided by a depot ship depend upon whether typical client warship missions are measured in hours, or days, or weeks. A warship crew may be expected to remain at their stations for missions measured in hours, but longer missions may require provisions for dining, sleeping, and personal hygiene. The crew of small warships may carry individual combat rations and urinate or defecate from the weather deck. Longer missions typically require storage provisions for drinking water and preserved food, and some resting area for the crew, although rest may be limited to a sheltered spot to sit or recline. Cooking may be limited to warming food on an exhaust vent, and buckets may be used for bathing, laundry, and sanitary waste. Habitability standards vary among navies, but client warships large enough to include a head, bunks, a shower, a kitchen stove, refrigerated food storage, a drinking water distillation unit, and a laundry require little more than medical and repair service from a depot ship. Depot ships are similar to repair ships, but provide a wider range of services to a smaller portion of the fleet. Depot ships undertake repair work for a flotilla of small warships, while repair ships offer more comprehensive repair capability for a larger variety of fleet warships. Depot ships also provide personnel and resupply services for their flotilla. Some depot ships may transport their short-range landing or attack craft from home ports to launch near the scene of battle. The following summary of World War II depot ships indicates the range of locations and warships served:

=== Boom defence depot ships ===
HMS St. Columba was the depot ship for the boom defence vessels at Greenock. The survey ship HMS Endeavour (J61) was a depot ship for boom defence in Singapore and the Mediterranean Sea.

=== Coastal forces depot ships ===
Requisitioned merchant ships HMS Aberdonian (F74) and Vienna (F138) and the French Belfort (U63) were used as depot ships for Coastal Forces of the Royal Navy. Aberdonian started at Fort William, Scotland, but spent most of the war at Dartmouth, Devon, while Vienna was in the Mediterranean. The Loch-class frigates Loch Assynt (K438) and Loch Torridon (K654) became coastal forces depot ships HMS Derby Haven and Woodbridge Haven, respectively.

=== Destroyer depot ships ===
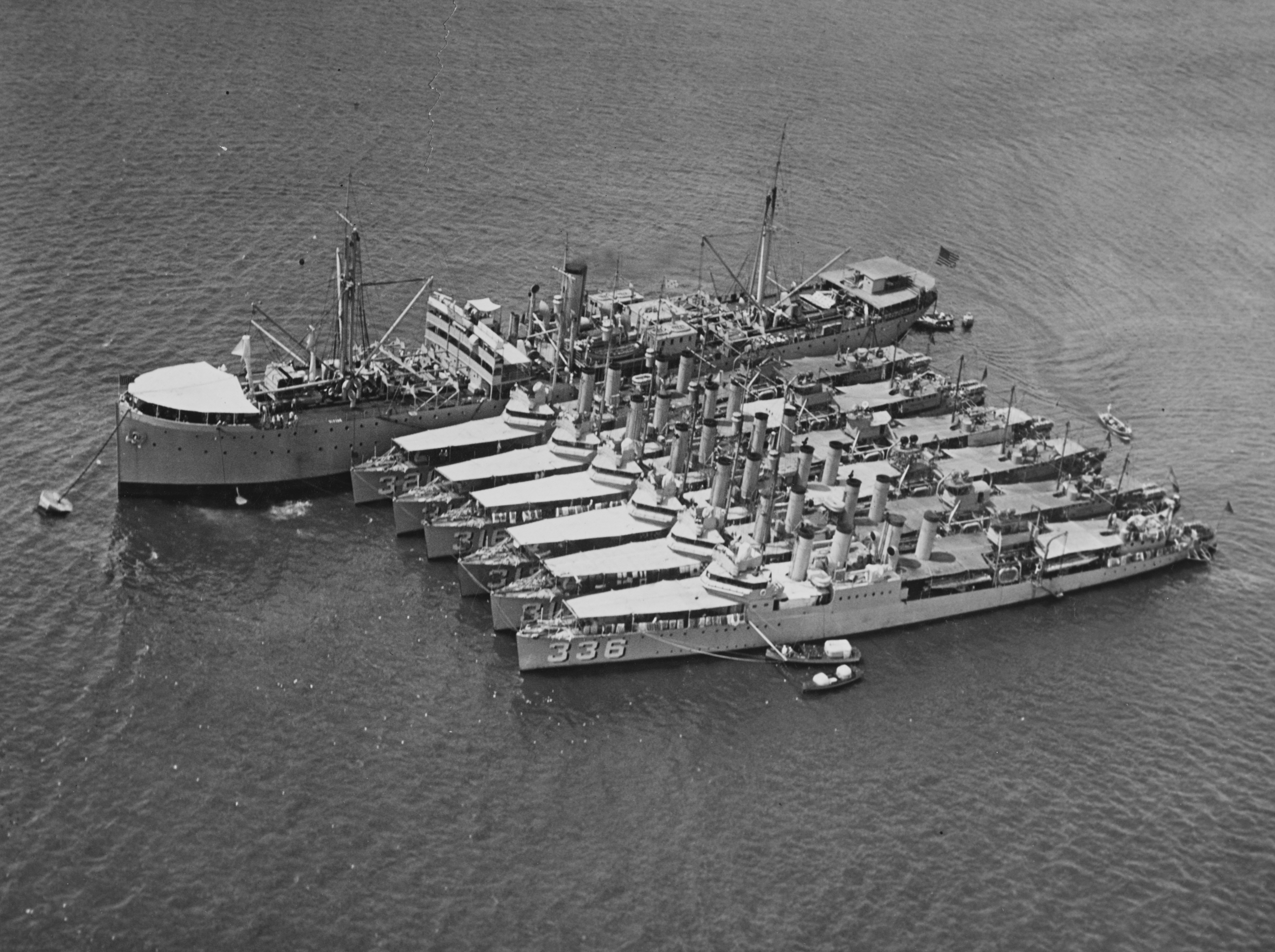
Destroyer tender USS Altair moored in Pearl Harbor with destroyers on 8 February 1925.

- USS Alcor served in the Pacific after conversion from a repair ship in 1944.
- USS Altair served in the Atlantic.
- USS Black Hawk was with the Asiatic Fleet in 1941 and transferred to Alaska for the remainder of the war.
- HMS Blenheim served with the Home Fleet, at Iceland, and in the Mediterranean.
- USS Cascade
- USS Denebola served in the Atlantic.
- USS Dixie served in the Pacific.
- USS Dobbin served in the Pacific.
- HMS Greenwich (F10) served in Scapa Flow, Canada, Iceland, and with the Home Fleet.
- USS Hamul
- HMS Hecla (F20) was based at Greenock and Iceland before being sunk in the Mediterranean during Operation Torch.
- USS Markab
- USS Melville served in the Atlantic.
- HMS Philoctetes (F134) was stationed at Freetown.
- USS Piedmont served in the Pacific.
- USS Prairie served in the Pacific.
- USS Sierra served in the Pacific.
- HMAS Stalwart (D 215)
- HMS Tyne (F24) served with the Home Fleet and British Pacific Fleet.
- HMS Vindictive was a repair ship before being converted to a Home Fleet destroyer depot ship in 1945.
- USS Whitney served in the Pacific.
- HMS Woolwich served in home waters, the Mediterranean, and the East Indies.
- USS Yosemite served in the Pacific.

=== Escort vessel depot ship ===
HMS Sandhurst (F92) was a converted merchant ship used as a depot ship for coastal convoy escorts at Dover, Derry and Greenock.

=== Landing craft depot ships ===
The first landing craft carrier was completed by Japan in 1935. The United States Navy began launching dock landing ships in 1943. The 8,580-ton Beachy Head-class ships HMS Buchan Ness, Dodman Point, Dungeness, Fife Ness, Girdle Ness and Spurn Point were used as depot ships for Ramped Cargo Lighters during the last year of World War II.

=== Minesweeper depot ships ===
Nettlebeck, Brommy and Van der Groeben were depot ships for the 1st, 2nd and 3rd R boat flotillas, respectively. The 1st and 3rd flotillas were at Kiel, and the 2nd was at Cuxhaven. HMS Ambitious (F169), Celebrity and St. Tudno were depot ships for minesweepers. Ambitious was stationed at Scapa Flow, and St. Tudno was at the Nore. Japan requisitioned Chohei Maru, Rokusan Maru and Teishu Maru from civilian service as depot ships for minesweepers.

=== Motor torpedo boat depot ships ===
Tsingtau and Tanga were depot ships for the 1st and 2nd E-boat flotillas at Kiel and Hamburg, respectively. Kamikaze Maru, Nihonkai Maru, Shinsho Maru and Shuri Maru were requisitioned from civilian service as depot ships for Japanese Motor Torpedo Boats.

=== Patrol vessel depot ships ===
HMS Marshal Soult and the French ships Courbet, Paris, Coucy and Diligente were used as depot ships for vessels patrolling the English Channel after the Second Armistice at Compiègne. HMS Brilliant was based at Lerwick, Shetland Islands, in July 1917 as a depot ship for trawlers and patrol boats. HMS Ambitious was a depot ship at Scapa Flow, Orkney Islands during the First World War.

=== Seaplane depot ship ===
Includes both seaplane carriers and ships intended to support the operation of large flying boats, known as seaplane tenders in United States usage.

=== Submarine depot ships ===
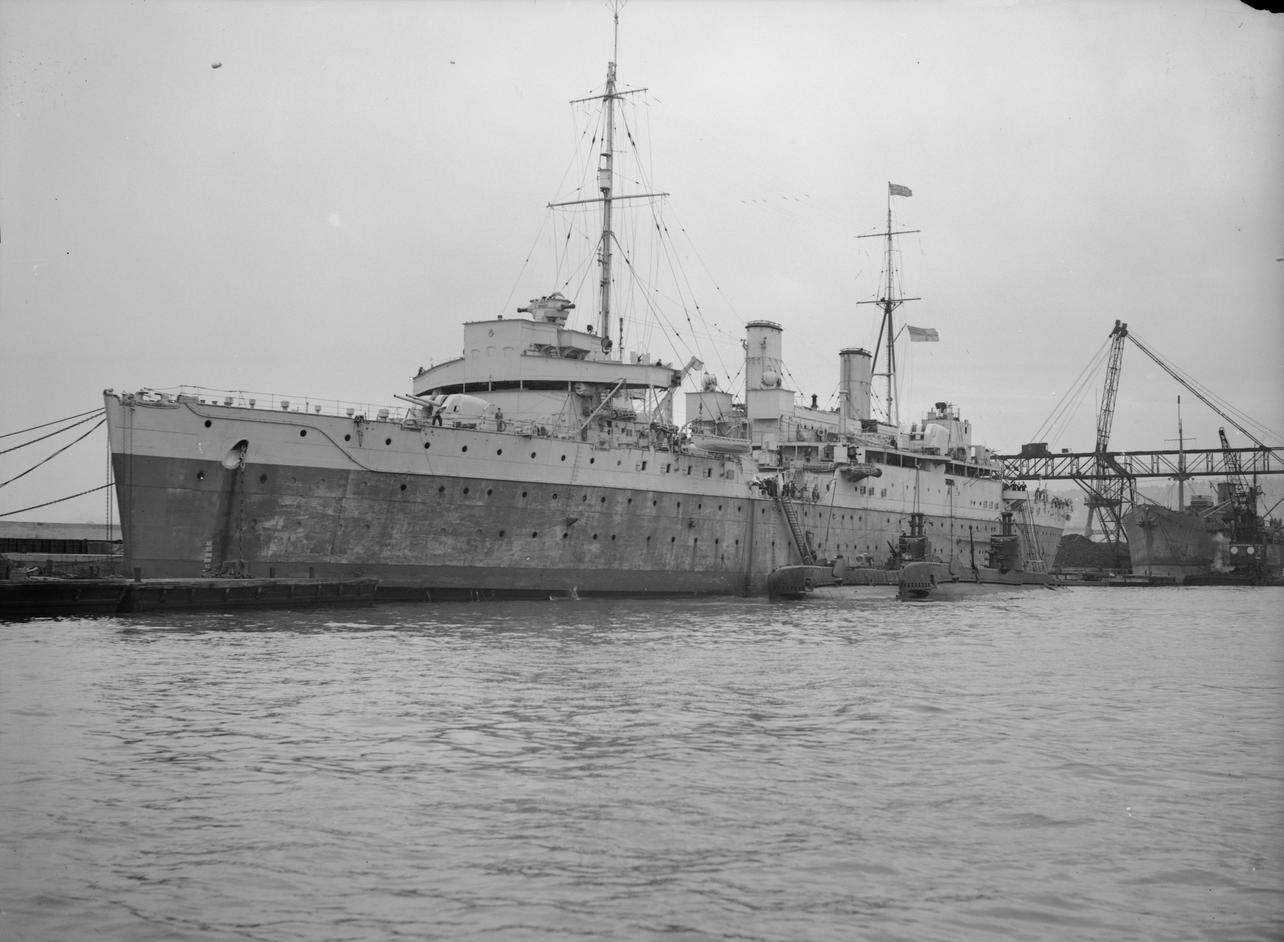
Submarine depot ship HMS Maidstone with submarines alongside

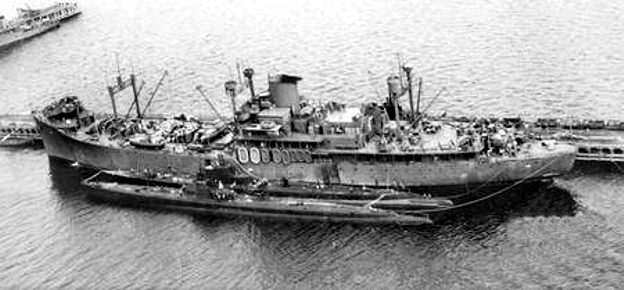
Submarine tender USS Pelias with submarines alongside

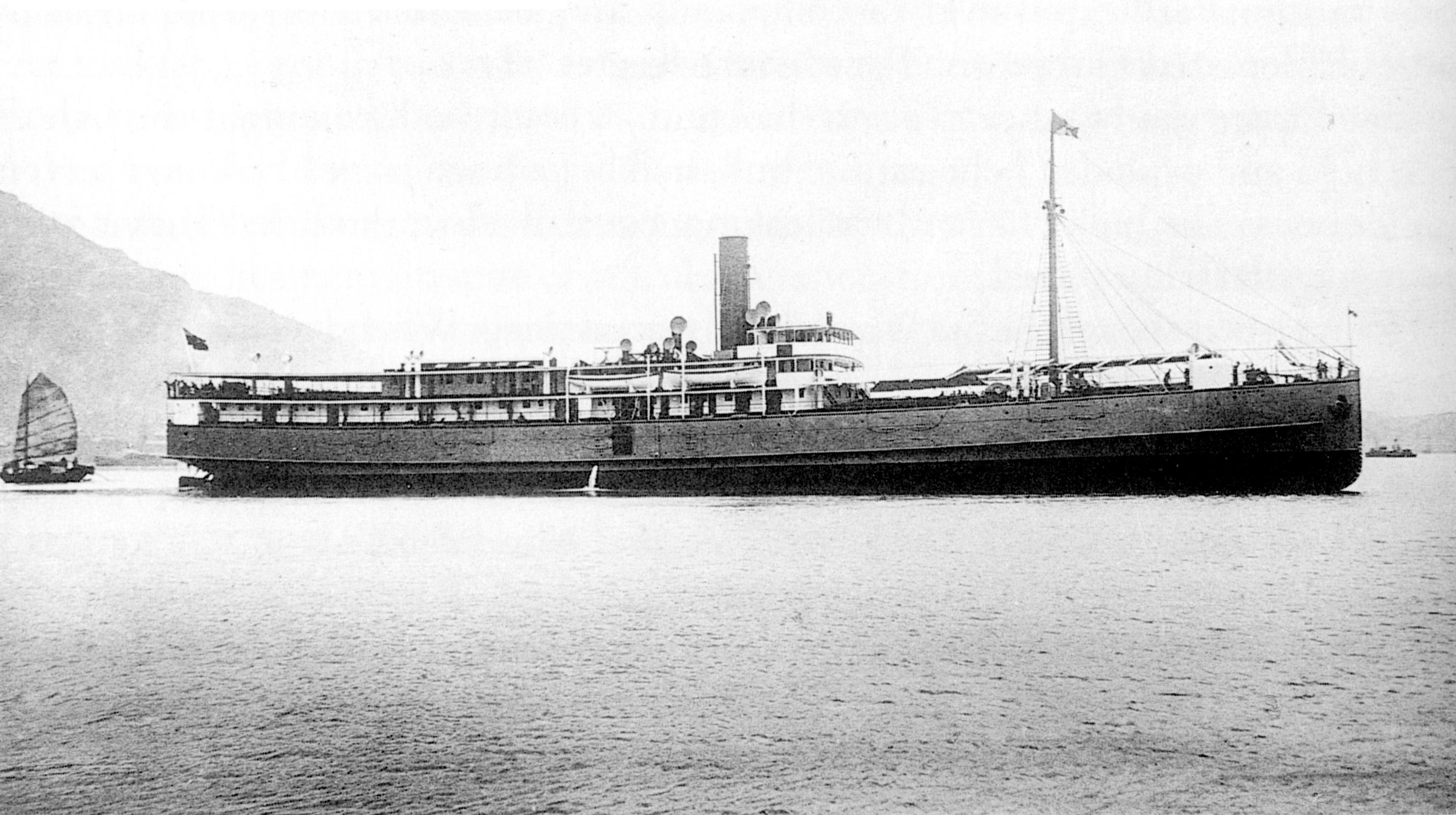
Whang Pu is representative of the depot ships requisitioned from civilian service

- USS Aegir served in the Pacific.
- HMS Adamant served with the Eastern Fleet and British Pacific Fleet.
- HMS Alecto (J10) served at Portsmouth and became the boom defense depot ship.
- HMS Ambrose was depot ship for the Fourth Flotilla, 1919 to 1928.
- USS Antaeus was converted to a troopship.
- USS Anthedon was stationed at Subic Bay in 1945.
- USS Apollo served in the Pacific.
- Wilhelm Bauer provided command facilities and submarine crew accommodations for the 7th U-boat Flotilla.
- USS Beaver was depot ship for Squadron 50 at Rosneath before transfer to Alaska.
- Bogata Maru was requisitioned from civilian service as depot ship for the Monsun Gruppe.
- HMS Bonaventure was the depot ship for X craft.
- USS Bushnell was depot ship for Squadron 12 at Fremantle and Majuro.
- USS Canopus was lost serving as the Asiatic Fleet depot ship.
- Chōgei was depot ship for Subron 6.
- USS Clytie served in the Pacific.
- HMS Cochrane
- HMS Cyclops (F31) served first in the Mediterranean, and then with the Home Fleet.
- Donau provided command facilities and submarine crew accommodations for the 1st U-boat Flotilla.
- USS Euryale was stationed in New Guinea and the Admiralty Islands.
- HMS Forth was depot ship for the 2nd and 3rd submarine flotillas.
- USS Fulton was depot ship for Squadron 8 in Pearl Harbor, Midway Atoll, Brisbane, New Guinea, Saipan and Subic Bay.
- USS Howard W. Gilmore was stationed at Subic Bay in 1945.
- USS Griffin was stationed in Newfoundland in late 1941 before serving in Brisbane and then in Pearl Harbor and Fremantle as depot ship for Squadron 12.
- Heian Maru was requisitioned from civilian service as depot ship for Subron 1.
- Hie Maru was requisitioned from civilian service as depot ship for Subron 8.
- USS Holland was depot ship for Squadron 2 with the Asiatic Fleet before moving to Australia, Saipan and Guam.
- Isar provided command facilities and submarine crew accommodations for the 6th U-boat flotilla.
- Jingei was depot ship for Subron7.
- The 5,747-ton French Jules Verne was initially stationed at Oran and later at Madagascar.
- Waldemar Kophamel provided command facilities and submarine crew accommodations for U-boat flotillas.
- Lech provided command facilities and submarine crew accommodations for the 5th U-boat Flotilla.
- HMS Lucia (F27) served in the Indian Ocean and was the Red Sea force base ship in 1940.
- HMS Maidstone served at Rosyth and in the South Atlantic, Mediterranean, Indian Ocean and Pacific.
- HMS Medway served in China and the Mediterranean.
- HMS Montclare served with the British Pacific Fleet.
- Nagoya Maru was requisitioned from civilian service as depot ship for Subron 4.
- USS Orion was stationed at Fremantle and New Guinea.
- USS Otus was under conversion from civilian service at Manila when Japan attacked and became a landing craft depot ship at Fremantle.
- Antonio Pacinotti was a Regia Marina submarine depot ship.
- USS Pelias was depot ship for Squadron 6 at the attack on Pearl Harbor and in Fremantle.
- HNLMS Pelikaan was stationed in the Dutch East Indies.
- USS Proteus was depot ship for Squadron 20 in Tokyo Bay for the Surrender of Japan.
- Rio de Janeiro Maru was requisitioned from civilian service as depot ship for Subron 5.
- Saar provided command facilities and submarine crew accommodations for the 2nd U-boat Flotilla.
- Santos Maru was requisitioned from civilian service as depot ship for Subron 2.
- HMS Talbot was the Malta submarine depot ship.
- USS Sperry was depot ship for Squadron 10 at Brisbane, Pearl Harbor, Majuro and Guam.
- HMS Titania was the depot ship for Welman submarines.
- Tsukushi Maru was requisitioned from civilian service as depot ship for Subron 11.
- Alessandro Volta was a Regia Marina submarine depot ship.
- Erwin Wassner provided command facilities and submarine crew accommodations for U-boat flotillas.
- Weichsel provided command facilities and submarine crew accommodations for the 3rd U-boat Flotilla.
- HMAS Whang Pu was the Royal Australian Navy submarine depot ship.
- HMS Wolfe (F37) was depot ship for the 3rd submarine flotilla until transferred to the Eastern Fleet in 1944.
- HMS Wuchang (F30) served with the Eastern Fleet.
- Otto Wunsche provided command facilities and submarine crew accommodations for U-boat flotillas.
- Yasukuni Maru was requisitioned from civilian service as depot ship for Subron 3.

== Regulations ==
Some depot ships support a naval base; for example, HMAS Platypus, an Australian submarine depot ship, was, for a time (in between the loss of her original submarine charges and the assignment of others), taken into Britain's Royal Navy to serve as a base ship at Darwin, Australia during World War II. In the Royal Navy, under section 87 of the Naval Discipline Act 1866 (29 & 30 Vict. c. 109), the provisions of the act only applied to officers and men of the Royal Navy borne on the books of a warship. When shore establishments began to become more common it was necessary to allocate the title of the establishment to an actual vessel which became the nominal depot ship for the men allocated to the establishment and thus ensured they were subject to the provisions of the Act. Some were also used as floating barracks designated receiving ships or receiving hulks.

== See also ==
- Stone frigate, a shore establishment listed as a ship for the purposes of naval organization.

== Sources ==
- Auphan, Paul; Mordal, Jacques (1959). The French Navy in World War II. Westport, Ct: Greenwood Press. ISBN 0-8371-8660-9.
- Blair, Clay (1975). Silent Victory. New York: J.B. Lippincott Company. ISBN 9780397007530.
- Kafka, Roger; Pepperburg, Roy L (1946). Warships of the World (Victory ed.). New York: Cornell Maritime Press.
- Lenton, H.T. (1968). Navies of the Second World War. Vol. Royal Netherlands Navy (Doubleday ed.). Garden City, New York: Doubleday & Company.
- Lenton, H.T. (1975). German Warships of the Second World War. New York: Arco Publishing. ISBN 0-668-04037-8.
- Lenton, H.T.; Colledge, J.J. (1964). British and Dominion Warships of World War II. Garden City, New York: Doubleday & Company.
- Silverstone, Paul H. (1968). U.S. Warships of World War II. Garden City, New York: Doubleday & Company.
- Watts, Anthony J. (1966). Japanese Warships of World War II. Garden City, New York: Doubleday & Company.
