= TCG Derya =

TCG Derya is the name of the following ships of the Turkish Navy:

- TCG Derya (A-576), ex-USS Piedmont, a Dixie-class destroyer tender in service with Turkey 1982–1994
- TCG Derya (A-1590), an auxiliary ship commissioned in 2024

== See also ==
- Derya
