= Derya =

Derya is a Turkish unisex given name. It is also used as a surname. The word is derived from the Persian دریا ("Daryā"), meaning sea. In Old Persian it was pronounced 𐎭𐎼𐎹 (drayah-).

== Given name ==
- Derya Açıkgöz (borm 1977), Turkish female weightlifter
- Derya Akay (born 1988), Turkish artist
- Derya Akkaynak, Turkish mechanical engineer
- Derya Aktop (born 1980), Turkish boxer
- Derya Alabora (born 1959), Turkish actress
- Derya Arbaş Berti (1968–2003), Turkish-American actress
- Derya Arhan (born 1999), Turkish football player
- Derya Ayaydın (born 1988), Turkish politician
- Derya Ayverdi, Turkish actress
- Derya Bard Sarıaltın (born 1977), Turkish archer of Ukrainian origin
- Derya Büyükuncu (born 1976), Turkish-American Olympian swimmer
- Derya Can Göçen, Turkish world record holder free-diver
- Derya Cebecioğlu (born 2000), Turkish female volleyball player
- Derya Cıbır (born 1990), Turkish judoka
- Derya Çalışkan (born 1966), Turkish judoka
- Derya Çayırgan (born 1987), Turkish volleyball player
- Derya Çimen, Turkish model
- Derya Durmaz (born 1973), Turkish actress
- Derya Erke (1983–2025), Turkish Olympian swimmer
- Derya Karadaş (born 1981), Turkish actress
- Derya Sazak (born 1956), Turkish journalist and writer
- Derya Tınkaoğlu (born 1988), Turkish handball player
- Derya Türk-Nachbaur (born 1973), German politician
- Derya Uluğ (born 1986), Turkish singer
- Derya Yanık (born 1972), Turkish politician and lawyer

== Surname ==
- Doğuş Derya (born 1978), Turkish Cypriot activist and politician
- Huseyn Derya (1975–2014), Azerbaijani rapper and actor

== Other uses ==
- TCG Derya (A-576) (1982–1994), former auxiliary ship of the Turkish Navy
- TCG Derya (A-1590), auxiliary ship of the Turkish Naval Forces

== See also ==
- Daria (name)
