= USS Vulcan (AR-5) =

1940 Vulcan-class repair ship

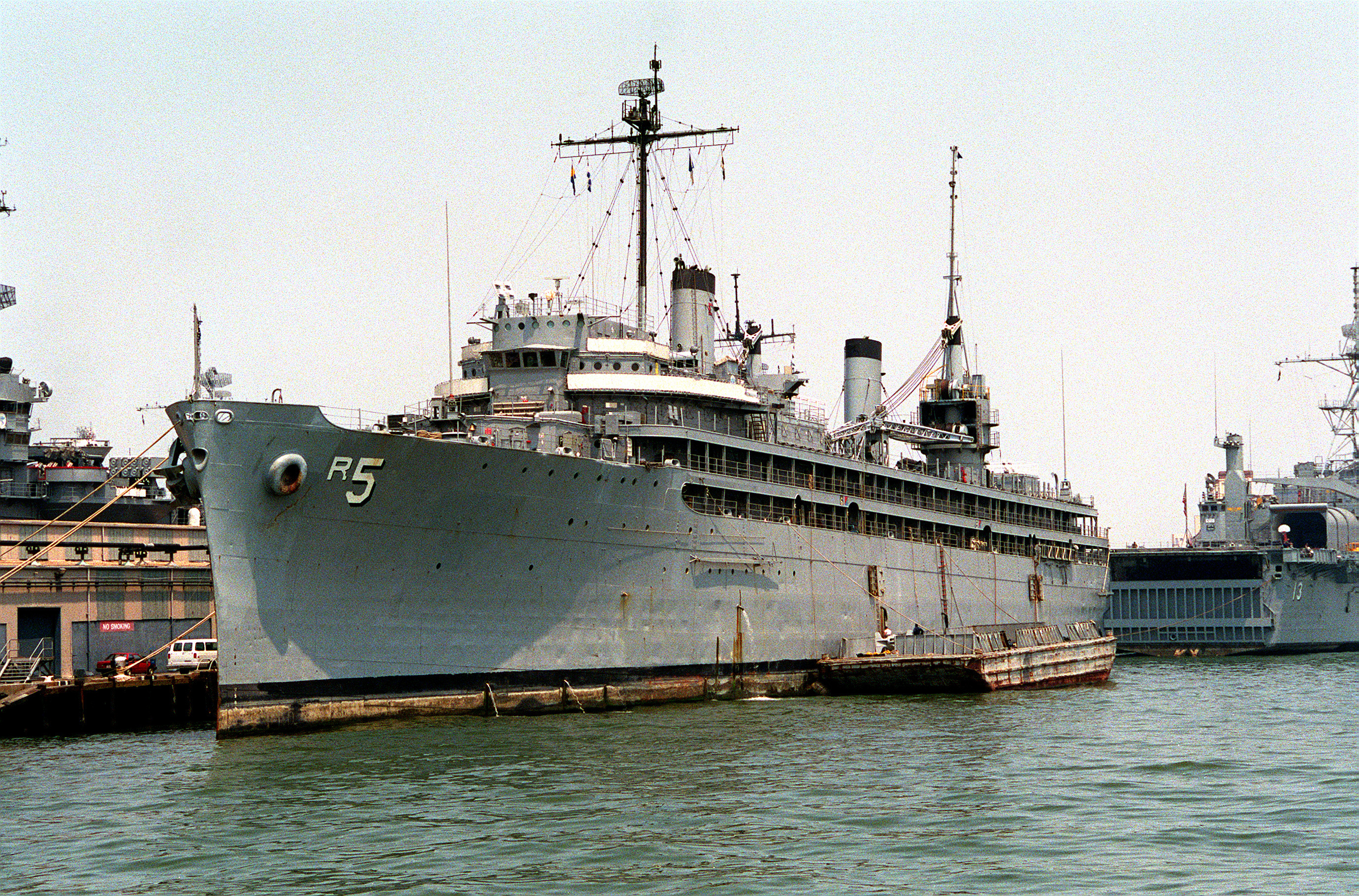
- USS Vulcan in June 1992

History

United States
- Name: USS Vulcan
- Namesake: Vulcan
- Builder: New York Shipbuilding Corporation
- Laid down: 16 December 1939
- Launched: 14 December 1940
- Commissioned: 14 June 1941
- Decommissioned: 30 September 1991
- Stricken: 28 July 1992
- Honors and awards: 1 battle star (World War II)
- Fate: Sold for scrapping, 2006

General characteristics
- Class & type: Vulcan-class repair ship
- Displacement: 12,911 long tons (13,118 t)
- Length: 530 ft (160 m)
- Beam: 73 ft 4 in (22.35 m)
- Draft: 19 ft (5.8 m)
- Speed: 19.2 knots (35.6 km/h; 22.1 mph)
- Complement: 1,297
- Armament: 4 × 5 in (127 mm)/38 guns; 4 × 0.5 in (12.7 mm) machine guns

USS Vulcan (AR-5) was the lead ship of her class of repair ships of the United States Navy. The ship was laid down on 16 December 1939 at Camden, New Jersey, by the New York Shipbuilding Corporation; launched on 14 December 1940; sponsored by Mrs. James Forrestal, wife of the Under Secretary of the Navy; and commissioned at the Philadelphia Navy Yard on 14 June 1941.

== Service history ==
USS Vulcan AR-5 US Navy repair ship was propelled by a twin-screw steam turbine system, powered by two steam turbines. The steam was generated by eight oil-fired boilers, with each turbine producing 5,500 horsepower (hp) to turn each shaft. This system gave the ship a top speed of 18 knots.

Propulsion system details Engines: Two steam turbines, each producing 5,500 hp. Power generation: The turbines were powered by steam from eight oil-fired boilers. Drive system: Twin-screw system, meaning two propeller shafts were driven by the turbines. Performance: The ship had a sustained speed of 18 knots. Onboard power: In addition to propulsion, the ship's machinery, including electrical systems, were powered by two steam turbine-driven generators that each produced 750 kilowatts of power.

=== Iceland, 1941–1943 ===
Following her shakedown cruise to San Juan, Puerto Rico, and Guantanamo Bay, Vulcan underwent post-shakedown repairs at the Philadelphia Navy Yard in mid-August. Assigned to the Atlantic Fleet Train on the 20th, the repair ship departed Philadelphia the following day and proceeded, via Casco Bay, Maine, to Argentia, Newfoundland.

By this time, the Atlantic Fleet was becoming more fully involved in the Battle of the Atlantic. In July 1941, at the request of the Icelandic government, the United States had occupied Iceland – the strategic island which, as the German geopolitician Karl Haushofer wrote, lay pointed "like a pistol ... at the United States" – and had established bases at the barren ports of Reykjavík and Hvalfjörður. Marine wags soon nicknamed these places "Rinky Dink" and "Valley Forge", respectively.

Prompted by fears that the Tirpitz would break out into the Atlantic as her sister ship, Bismarck had done in the spring of 1941, the Navy dispatched a task force to Iceland to deter such a move. Accordingly, the unit – designated Task Force (TF) 4 and based around Wasp (CV-7) – sailed from Argentia on 23 September. Besides the valuable carrier, the force included Mississippi (BB-41), Wichita (CA-45), Vulcan, and a screen of four destroyers. A German U-boat, prowling to the southwest of Iceland, sighted the ships on the 26th, but could not keep up with or identify the Americans. Having outpaced their adversary, TF 4 reached "Valley Forge" on 28 September.

While Tirpitz did not sortie, the U-boats continued their deadly forays against Allied shipping. By the fall of 1941, American destroyers were engaged in convoy operations half-way across the Atlantic, turning their charges over to British units at the MOMP (mid-ocean meeting point). On 4 September, Greer (DD-145) narrowly avoided being torpedoed after attacking a German U-boat.

During the midwatch on 17 October 1941, U-568 torpedoed Kearny (DD-432) while the latter was screening Convoy SC 48. With 11 bluejackets dead, Kearny limped into Reykjavík, a gaping hole and buckled plating disfiguring her starboard side below and aft of the bridge. Vulcan provided timely and effective assistance to the stricken warship. Since permanent repair facilities – such as a drydock – were nonexistent, Kearny pulled up alongside the repair vessel, and her port side was flooded to raise the torpedo hole above water level. Soon, Vulcan's repair force had cut away the damaged plating and had fixed a patch. By Christmas 1941, Kearny could sail for the east coast and permanent repairs at Boston.

Operations in these inhospitable climes posed natural dangers as well – fog and storms frequently hampered operations and caused collisions. In November, Niblack (DD-424) was rammed by a Norwegian freighter. The destroyer had been scouring Iceland's coastal waters for a straying Icelandic merchant vessel when the accident occurred, costing Niblack an anchor and putting a hole in her side plating. Vulcan swiftly fixed the damage and patched the side, enabling the destroyer to resume her vital escort duties.

Vulcan remained in Iceland's chill and barren area into the spring of 1942. Meanwhile, on 7 December 1941, a Japanese task force had struck Pearl Harbor and severely crippled the battleships of the Pacific Fleet, plunging the United States into war on both oceans. Vulcan – bound for home in company with Tarazed (AF-13), Livermore (DD-429), and the familiar Kearny – departed "Valley Forge" on 26 April 1942 and arrived at Boston on 2 May. There, the repair ship underwent a drydocking before she returned northward to support the Fleet's operations in the North Atlantic. Based at Argentia from 16 June to 14 November, Vulcan shifted to Hvalfjörður and relieved Melville (AD-2) there on 18 November. She remained at "Valley Forge" until she got underway on 6 April 1943, bound via Derry, Northern Ireland, for Hampton Roads.

=== Mediterranean, 1943–1944 ===
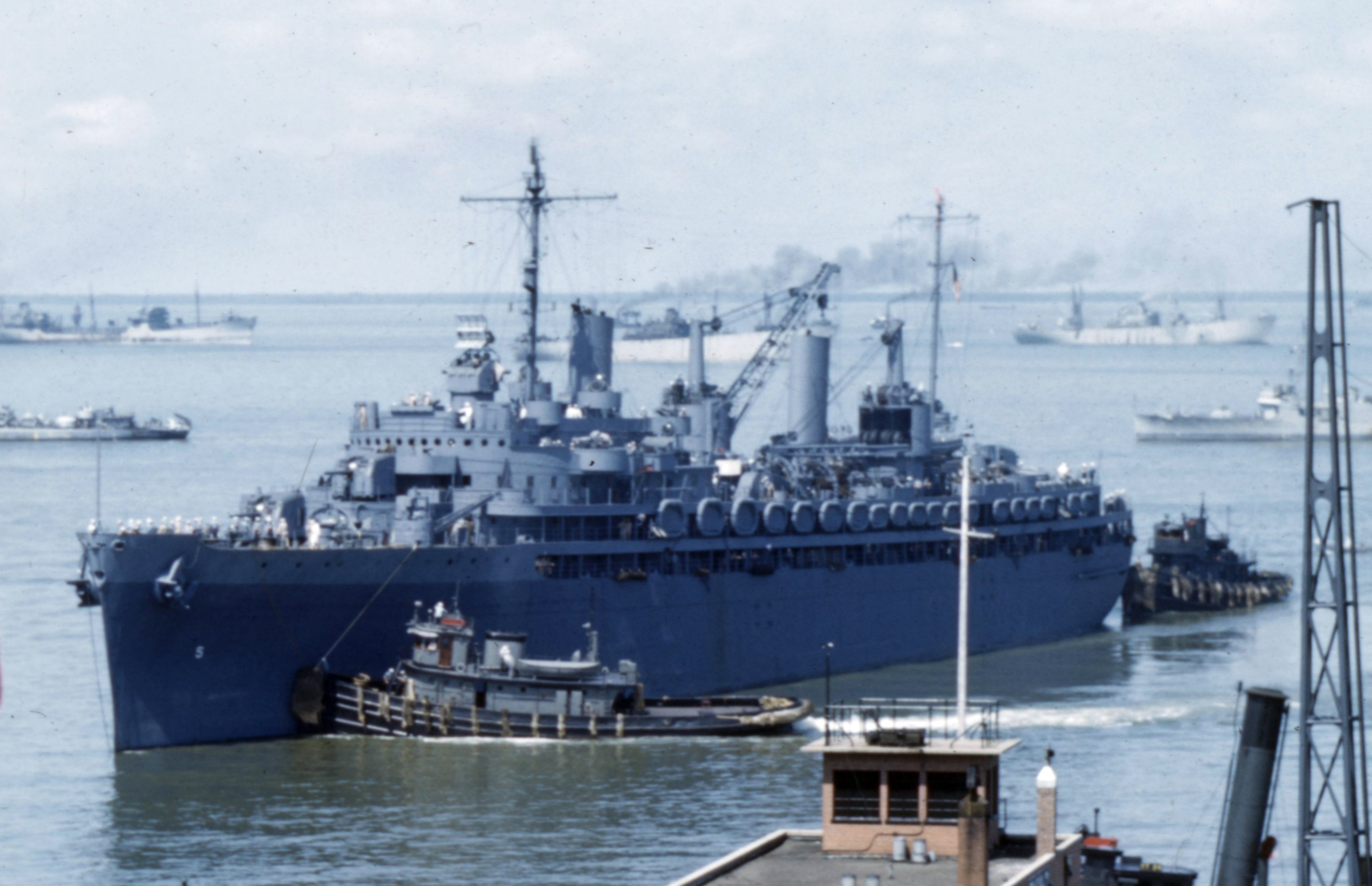
Leaving Norfolk, 22 June 1943

After repairs at Norfolk from 8 to 22 June, Vulcan headed for the Mediterranean and arrived at Oran, Algeria, on the 27th. Shifting to Algiers in late June, Vulcan sent a fire and rescue party to the burning British ammunition ship Arrow. Three Vulcan sailors brought a boat alongside the flaming vessel and cut through her side plating to rescue British sailors trapped below decks. For their bravery and resourcefulness, the trio from the repair ship received decorations from the British government and Navy and Marine Corps Medals from their own.

Vulcan remained based on the North African coast into the summer of 1944. In August and September, the repair ship supported the invasion of southern France and received her sole battle star for providing repair services to the ships and craft involved in the operation.

=== Pacific, 1945–1946 ===
By late 1944, Vulcan was urgently required in the Pacific, and she accordingly departed the Mediterranean on 23 November 1944 in Convoy GUS-59. After voyage repairs at Norfolk which lasted into January 1945, the repair ship sailed for the South Pacific. Arriving at Guadalcanal on 9 February 1945, Vulcan operated successively out of Tulagi, Nouméa, and Ulithi for the remainder of the war. From Ulithi, Vulcan serviced the amphibious units which participated in the assault on the key island of Okinawa.

After hostilities with Japan ceased, Vulcan shifted to Okinawa and entered Buckner Bay in the wake of a destructive typhoon which had forced some ships aground and had severely damaged others. Repair work was well in hand by late September, when another typhoon threatened the anchorage. Vulcan led 17 merchantmen to sea in a typhoon evasion sortie – a mission successfully accomplished without loss or damage by 28 September.

Vulcan sailed for Japan immediately thereafter to support the occupation of the erstwhile enemy's home islands. Leading a group of service force ships and oilers through dangerous, still-mined waters, Vulcan arrived in Hiro Wan, near Kure, Japan, on 8 October. Here, the repair ship established an advance service unit to provide food, oil, and water to the ships of the occupation force based there. She also set up mail, medical, and recreational facilities ashore. In addition, she performed maintenance tasks on the diesel-powered vessels of the mine forces then clearing the waters around the Japanese home islands.

Vulcan also operated out of Kobe and Yokosuka into the new year. Departing Yokosuka on 9 March 1946, the repair ship sailed for the east coast of the United States, calling at Pearl Harbor and transiting the Panama Canal en route. She arrived at Brooklyn, New York, on 15 April 1946.

=== Atlantic Fleet, 1946–1991 ===
Vulcan operated at Newport, Rhode Island, until February 1954, when she shifted to Norfolk, Virginia. The ship, supporting the Atlantic Fleet with repair services, was homeported at Norfolk into the mid-1970s. During this time, she conducted repairs, alterations, and overhauls on a wide variety of vessels. She called at ports from the Caribbean to Canada, providing repair services to the Fleet at such ports as Guantanamo Bay, San Juan, New York, and Boston, as well as Mayport, Florida, and Charleston, South Carolina.

When American intelligence pinpointed the presence of Russian missiles in Cuba in the fall of 1962, the United States and the Soviet Union stood "eyeball to eyeball" in the Caribbean. Vulcan sailed to San Juan, where she provided essential repair services to the ships operating on the "quarantine" line off Cuban shores to prevent the arrival of any further Russian military equipment. The ship also assumed an additional role as electronics and ordnance repair vessel as well. After supporting the Cuban blockade from 2 to 26 November, she returned to Norfolk to resume normal operations.

Only once in the 1960s and 1970s did Vulcan venture beyond her normal deployment bounds of the east coast and the Caribbean. In the fall of 1964, the repair ship sailed for Europe to participate in NATO exercises. Departing Norfolk on 8 September, bound for Scotland, she arrived at Greenock on 21 September.

After participating in NATO Exercise "Teamwork", Vulcan called at Antwerp, Belgium; Le Havre, France; and Rota, Spain, before participating in amphibious Exercise "Operation Steel Pike I" off Huelva, Spain. She returned to Norfolk soon thereafter to again take up her regular duties.

Besides type and underway training exercises at sea, Vulcan made an occasional NROTC midshipman cruise and conducted individual ship exercises in between her regular long assignments as repair ship at Norfolk. Among the ships for which Vulcan provided availabilities was the intelligence ship Liberty (AGTR-5). Between 24 March and 21 April, Liberty lay alongside the repair ship before getting underway later that spring for the fateful overseas deployment in which she was attacked by Israeli planes and motor torpedo boats off El Arish on the morning of 8 June 1967.

In late 1975, Vulcan paid a working visit to Cartagena, Colombia, where she tended three ex-U.S. Navy destroyers of that nation's navy. Not only did Vulcan repair the vessels, but her crew also provided valuable training to their Colombian counterparts. During the ship's nine-month major overhaul in 1976, her long-time main battery – 4 × 5-inch (127 mm) guns – was removed and replaced by four 20-millimeter guns.

In the 1970s, Vulcan's itinerary included recreational and port visits to such places as Fort Lauderdale, Florida; Halifax, Nova Scotia; and the more regular ports such as Charleston and Guantanamo Bay. In 1977, while returning from underway training, Vulcan was called upon to assist a Portuguese destroyer named Coutinho. Alongside, Vulcan provided emergency boiler feedwater to the Coutinho.

By a matter of hours, Vulcan became the first non-hospital ship in the Navy to receive women officers on 1 November 1978. The first contingents of enlisted women arrived in December 1978 and January 1979. Vulcan's first point-to-point cruise with women took place in February 1979, with a trip to Earle, New Jersey. In September 1979, Vulcan left Norfolk for the Navy's first Mediterranean cruise with a mixed crew. A pioneer in the Women in Navy Ships (WINS) program, USS Vulcan had reserved positions for 66 women (including six officers) in its 730-member crew female sailors.

In September 1980, Vulcan deployed to the North Atlantic to participate in NATO exercise " Teamwork 80 " which included ships from the United States, United Kingdom, the Netherlands, and West Germany. Vulcan completed an extensive overhaul of thirteen months in mid-February 1983. Captain J. E. McConville, the ship's thirty-fourth commanding officer, guided Vulcan to a successful completion of the difficult overhaul and subsequent refresher training. In May 1983, while en route to Florida from Guantanamo Bay, Cuba, Vulcan assisted a Haitian refugee boat, the " Rose Carida, " adrift without power for three days.

Port visits to St. John's New Brunswick and Earle, N.J., were made in the first half of 1984. On 1 October, Vulcan left for Málaga, Spain, before arriving on station off Al Masirah, Oman where she was scheduled to relieve USS Yosemite (AD-19), another Second World War era vessel. Vulcan resumed her Norfolk duties in mid-1985.

=== Decommissioning and sale ===
Vulcan was decommissioned on 30 September 1991, struck from the Naval Vessel Register on 28 July 1992 and laid up in the Atlantic Reserve Fleet. She was transferred to the Maritime Administration on 1 February 1999, for lay up in the National Defense Reserve Fleet on the James River, Fort Eustis, Virginia. On 9 November 2006 the contract was awarded to Bay Bridge Enterprises LLC, Chesapeake, Virginia, for her scrapping, and she was towed to the shipbreakers on 19 December 2006.

== Awards ==
- Vulcan received one battle star for her World War II service.
- Navy Unit Commendation, 17-Jan-1991 to 28-Feb-1991, Desert Storm
- Meritorious Unit Commendation, 01-Jun-1989
- Navy E Ribbon, 01-Jul-1974 to 30-Jun-1975
- American Defense Service Medal (with "A" device)
- American Campaign Medal
- European–African–Middle Eastern Campaign Medal - Operation Dragoon 15 August to 25 September 1944
- Asiatic-Pacific Campaign Medal
- World War II Victory Medal
- Navy Occupation Service Medal (with Asia clasp)
- National Defense Service Medal (third)
- Armed Forces Expeditionary Medal, 30-Oct-1962 to 29-Nov-1962, Cuba, 06-May-1965 to 30-May-1965, Dominican Republic
- Southwest Asia Service Medal, 23-Jan-1991 to 15-Feb-1991
- Sea Service Ribbon
- Kuwait Liberation Medal (Saudi Arabia)
- Kuwait Liberation Medal (Kuwait)
