= USS Dixie (AD-14) =

Tender of the United States Navy

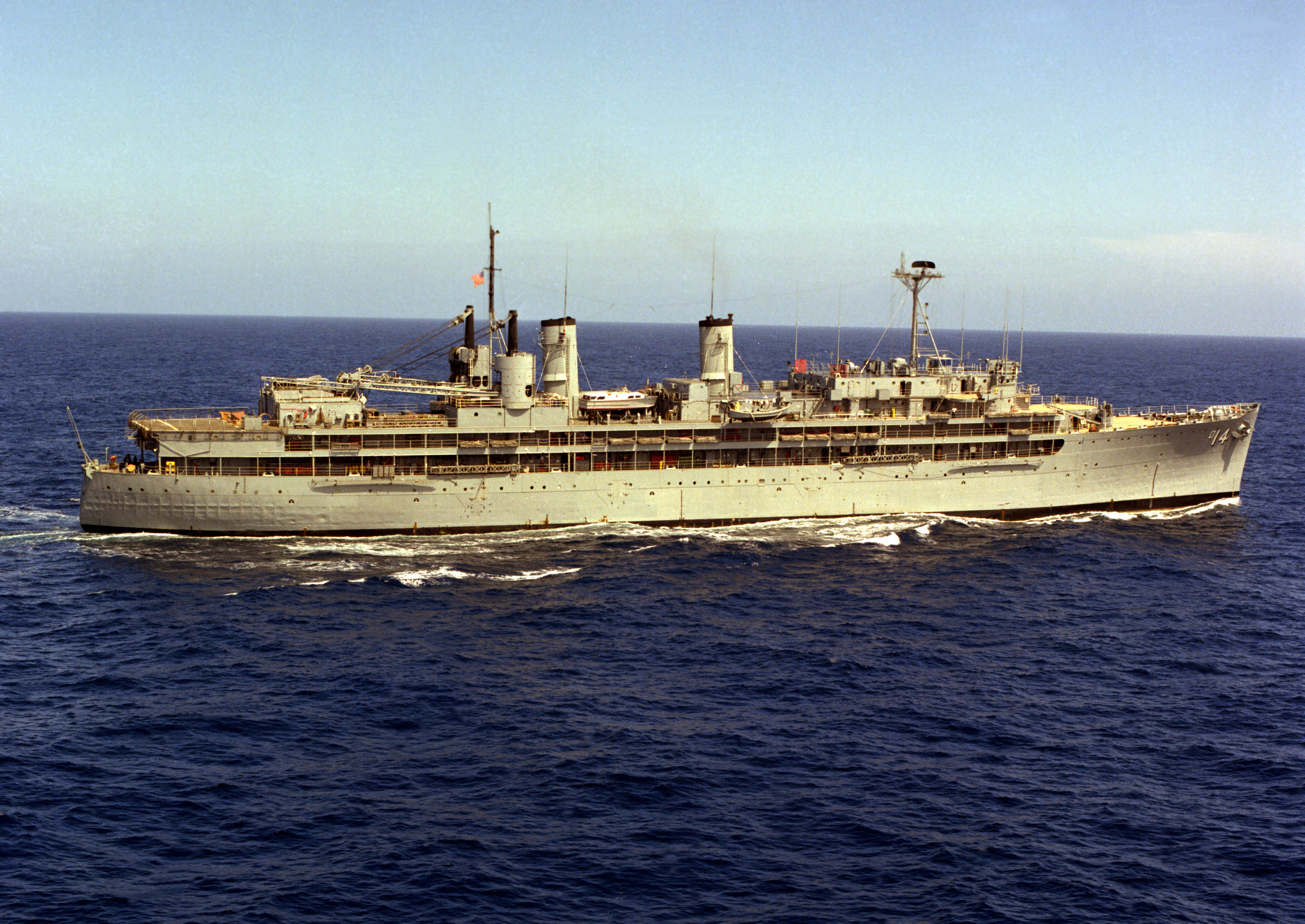
- USS Dixie (AD-14) in 1976

History

United States
- Name: USS Dixie
- Namesake: A collective designation for the southern states of the United States.
- Builder: New York Shipbuilding
- Laid down: 17 March 1938
- Launched: 27 May 1939
- Sponsored by: Mrs. A. C. Pickens
- Commissioned: 25 April 1940
- Decommissioned: 15 June 1982
- Stricken: 15 June 1982
- Motto: Can Do
- Honors and awards: 5 battle stars for Korean War service
- Fate: Sold for scrap, 17 February 1983

General characteristics
- Class & type: Dixie-class destroyer tender
- Displacement: 9,450 tons
- Length: 530 ft 6 in (161.70 m)
- Beam: 73 ft 3 in (22.33 m)
- Draught: 24 ft 5 in (7.44 m)
- Propulsion: Steam
- Speed: 18 kts
- Complement: 1262
- Armament: 4 x 5 in (130 mm)/38 cal

The second USS Dixie (AD-14) was the first of destroyer tenders class built for the United States Navy just before the start of the Second World War. Her objective was to assist destroyers within the vicinities of areas of engagement and to maintain them service-worthy.

Dixie was launched on 27 May 1939 by New York Shipbuilding Corporation in Camden, New Jersey, sponsored by Mrs. A. C. Pickens; and commissioned on 25 April 1940.

== History ==
=== World War II ===
Dixie sailed from Norfolk, Virginia, on 20 June 1940 for Pearl Harbor to serve the destroyers of the Battle Force until October, when she cleared for the West Coast and similar operations at San Diego, California. When the Japanese attacked Pearl Harbor on 7 December 1941, she was undergoing overhaul at Mare Island Navy Yard, and quickly took up the task of readying ships for war service. In March 1942 she returned to Pearl Harbor to tend destroyers and other ships of the Fleet until November.

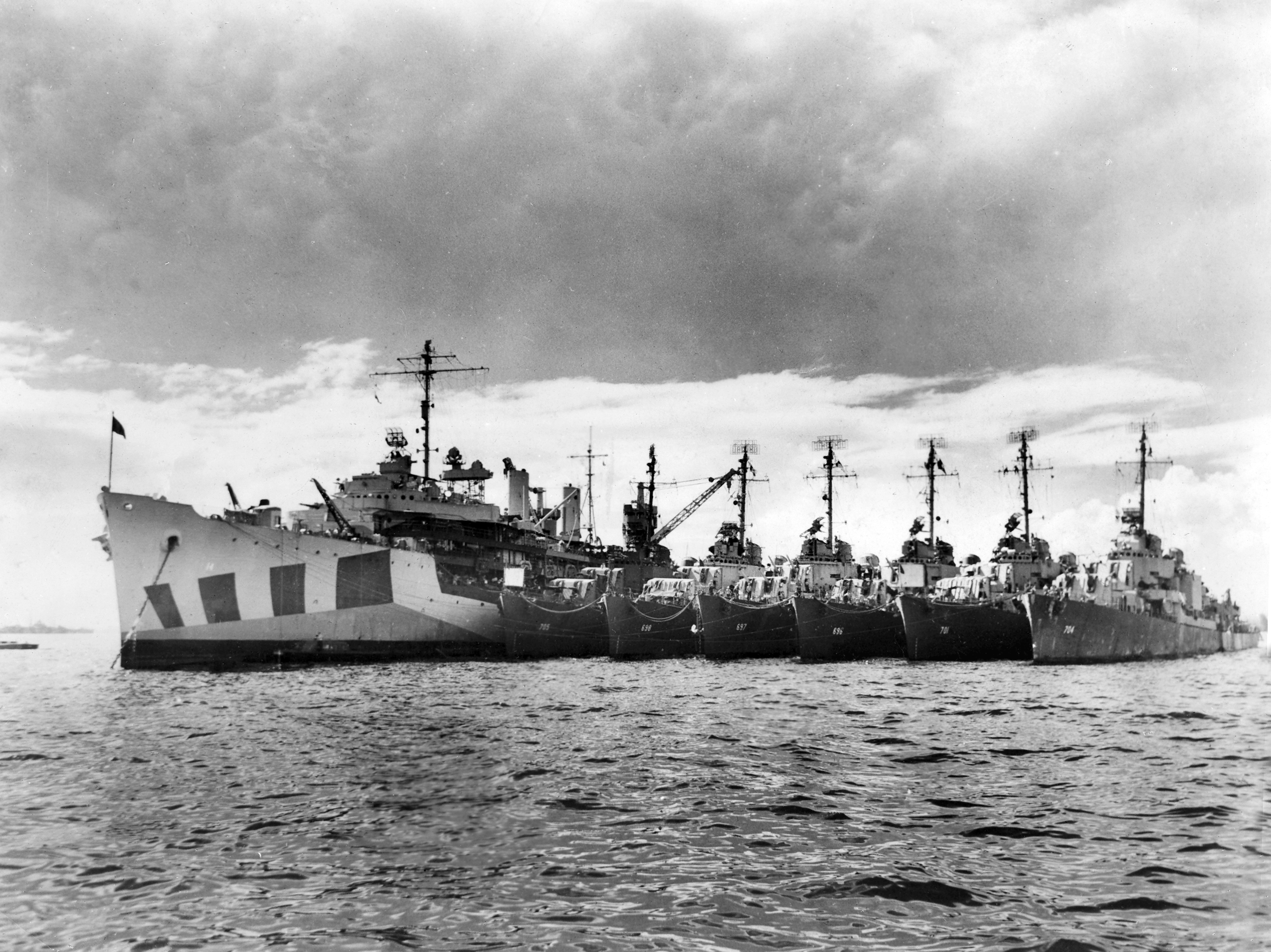
Dixie with six Allen M. Sumner class destroyers at Leyte, 1945.

Dixie alternated between Nouméa and Espiritu Santo in support of the operations in the Solomons from November 1942 to March 1944, then went to the Solomons where she was based at Hathorn Sound. In November she arrived at the huge fleet base at Ulithi, serving there until March 1945. Her essential services were next given at San Pedro Bay, Leyte, where Dixie remained until the end of the war. She served ships on occupation duty at Okinawa and Shanghai, then returned to the west coast in December 1945.

=== Post-World War II operations and Korean War ===
In the summer of 1946, Dixie sailed to Bikini Atoll for atomic weapons experiments, Operation Crossroads. In 1947 and in 1949 she cruised to the Far East and was based at Tsingtao to serve destroyers on patrol off the Chinese coast. Dixie was the last U.S. vessel to leave China when the Communist advance forced the evacuation of Americans from the mainland. It would take 37 years before U.S. naval vessels would once again visit China when USS Rentz (FFG-46), USS Reeves (DLG-24) and USS Oldendorf (DD-972) visited Tsingtao as part of China's new open door policy.

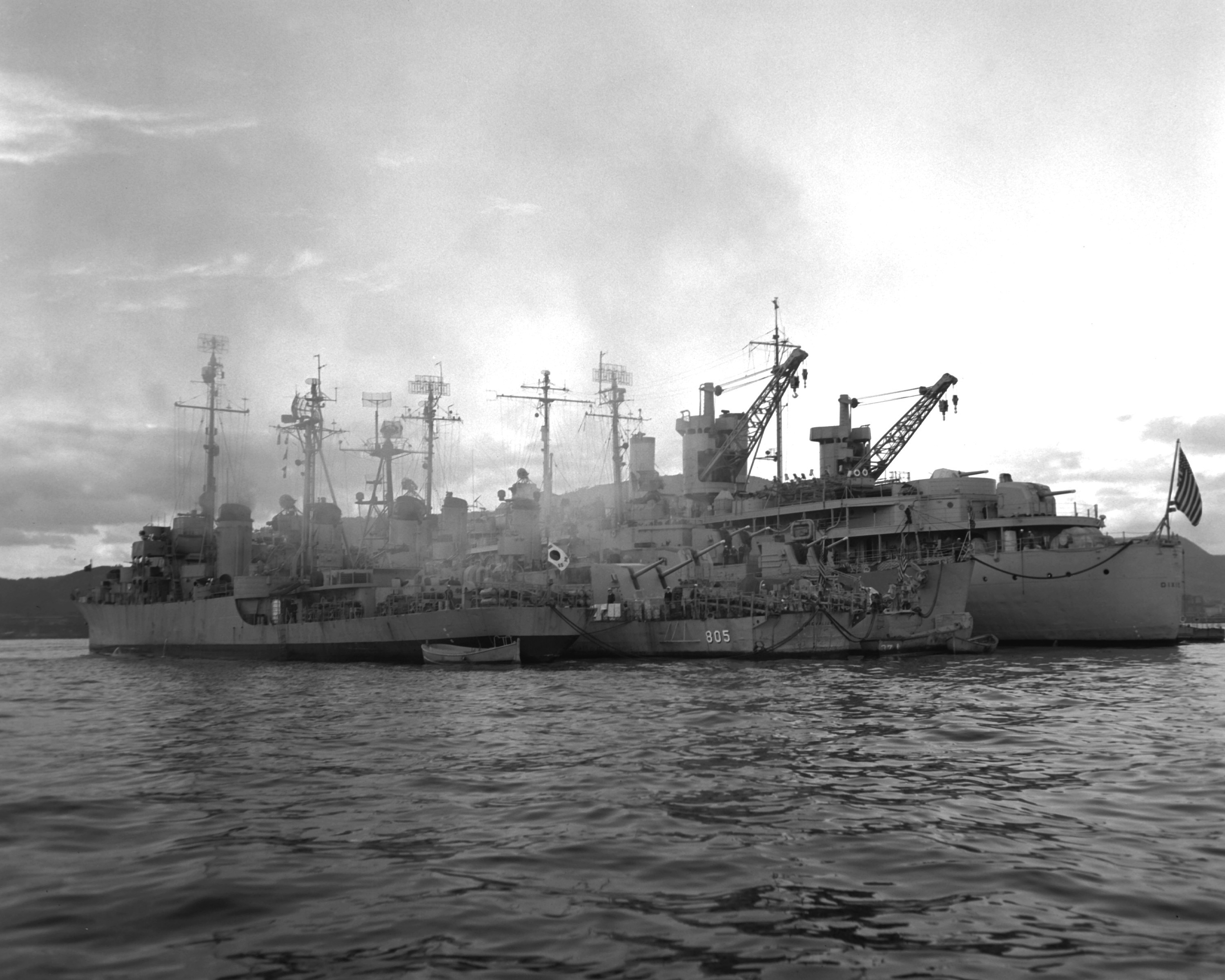
Dixie off Korea, 1950.

Following her departure from China, she acted as headquarters for the American consul and chargé d'affaires at Hong Kong. She continued her active service alternating flagship duty for Commander, Cruiser Destroyer Force, Pacific Fleet, at San Diego, with tours in the Far East, based on Sasebo, Japan, or Subic Bay, Philippine Islands. During two of these western Pacific tours, she rendered valuable assistance to the ships of the United Nations operating off Korea. In 1959 and again in 1960, in addition to serving at San Diego, she sailed to the Far East to provide tender facilities for the 7th Fleet.

Dixie received five battle stars for Korean War service.

=== Post-Korean War operations ===
From the early 1960s to 1982 Dixie was home-ported at Subic Bay in the Philippines where she served as a support ship for destroyers in the 7th Fleet, taking part in contingency operations in Laos in 1959 and Thailand in 1962. In 1963, the ship took part in 'Flagpole '63,' a joint naval exercise with the Republic of Korea. in 1965, the Dixie, alongside a large contingent of the Seventh Fleet, represented the United States of America's official entrance into the Vietnam War.

USS Dixie was home-ported out of San Diego, California 1969–1982 at least and was flagship for COMCRUSDESPAC usually tied up at pier 4. The USS Dixie was special because they served "Dixie Burgers" during the Vietnam war when moored in Subic Bay or anchored off the coast of Da Nang

=== Fate ===
In 1981, she was the first ship to be awarded the First Navy Jack as the ship with the longest active service in the Navy. Dixie was decommissioned and struck from the Naval Vessel Register on 15 June 1982. She was sold for scrap 17 February 1983 and scrapped at the now-defunct Ship breaking yard in Kaohsiung, Taiwan.

Preceded by ?	Oldest active ship of the United States Navy –1982	Succeeded by USS Prairie (AD-15)
