= HMS Woolwich (F80) =

British depot ship and destroyer tender

- Woolwich in May 1937

History

United Kingdom
- Name: HMS Woolwich
- Ordered: 4 April 1933
- Builder: Fairfield, Govan
- Laid down: 24 May 1933
- Launched: 20 September 1934
- Completed: 28 June 1935
- Identification: Pennant number: F80
- Fate: Sold for scrap, 1962

General characteristics (as built)
- Type: Destroyer tender
- Displacement: 8,750 long tons (8,890 t); 10,200 long tons (10,400 t) (full load)
- Length: 610 ft 3 in (186.0 m) o/a
- Beam: 64 ft (19.5 m)
- Draught: 16 ft 6 in (5.0 m)
- Installed power: 6,500 shp (4,800 kW); 4 water-tube boilers
- Propulsion: 2 shafts; 2 Parsons steam turbines
- Speed: 15.25 kn (28.24 km/h; 17.55 mph)
- Range: 12,000 nmi (22,000 km; 14,000 mi) at 10 knots (19 km/h; 12 mph)
- Complement: 666
- Armament: 4 × single QF 4-inch Mk V guns
- Armour: Deck: 1–2 inches (25–51 mm)

HMS Woolwich was a depot ship and destroyer tender built for the Royal Navy during the 1930s. The ship was initially deployed to support destroyers of the Mediterranean Fleet. During World War II, she was assigned to the Home, Mediterranean and Eastern Fleets. She briefly returned home in 1946, but rejoined the Mediterranean Fleet the following year. Woolwich permanently returned to the United Kingdom in 1948 where she became a maintenance and accommodation ship. The ship was sold for scrap in 1962.

== Description ==
Woolwich had an overall length of 610 feet 3 inches (186.0 m), a beam of 64 feet (19.5 m), and a draught of 23 feet 3 inches (7.1 m) at deep load. She normally displaced 8,750 long tons (8,890 t) and 15,575 long tons (15,825 t) at (full load). Each of the ship's two sets of Parsons geared steam turbines drove one propeller shaft. Steam was supplied by four Admiralty three-drum water-tube boilers. The turbines were rated at 6,500 shaft horsepower (4,800 kW) and gave Woolwich a speed of 15.25 knots (28.24 km/h; 17.55 mph). The ship carried 1,112 long tons (1,130 t) of fuel oil, which gave her a range of 12,000 nautical miles (22,000 km; 14,000 mi) at 10 knots (19 km/h; 12 mph). Her crew numbered 666 officers and ratings.

She was initially armed with four quick-firing (QF) four-inch Mk V gun on single high-angle mounts amidships. The four-inch (102 mm) gun mount had a maximum elevation of +80 degrees, and the gun could fire a 31 lb (14 kg) projectile with a muzzle velocity of 2,387 ft/s (728 m/s) to a maximum height of 31,000 feet (9,448.8 m) or a range of 16,430 yards (15,020 m). They had a rate of fire of about 15 rounds per minute. The guns were controlled by a High Angle Control System (HACS) fire-control director mounted above the bridge. To resupply her destroyers, the ship carried seventy-two 21-inch (533 mm) torpedoes and 200 depth charges.

During World War II, Woolwich's anti-aircraft armament was reinforced by two QF two-pounder light anti-aircraft (AA) guns in single mounts on the forecastle. The gun fired a 40-millimetre (1.6 in) 2-pound (0.91 kg) shell at a muzzle velocity of 2,400 ft/s (730 m/s) to a distance of 6,800 yards (6,200 m). The gun's rate of fire was approximately 96–98 rounds per minute. Four Oerlikon 20 mm guns in single mounts were also fitted as well as two quadruple Vickers .50 machine gun mounts.

Several radars were added during the war. A Type 285 gunnery radar was mounted on top of the HACS director and a Type 271/73 surface search radar was installed abaft the two-pounder guns on the forecastle.

Woolwich's main deck consisted of one-inch (25 mm) armour plate over the machinery spaces and her platform deck was two inches (51 mm) thick over the magazines.

== Construction and service ==
The ship was ordered on 4 April 1933 as part of the 1932 Naval Construction Programme. She was laid down by Fairfield Shipbuilding and Engineering Company in Govan on the River Clyde on 24 May 1933. Woolwich was launched on 20 September 1934 and completed on 28 June 1935. She was deployed to the Mediterranean after completion and was in Alexandria at the beginning of World War II in September 1939. The ship returned home and was based at Scapa Flow supporting destroyers of the Home Fleet by mid-1940. Woolwich sailed again for the Mediterranean in September; while circumnavigating Africa, she had to put into Mombasa, Kenya for repairs to her boilers before she arrived in Alexandria in November.

In mid-June 1942, Vice-Admiral Henry Harwood, Commander-in-Chief, Mediterranean Fleet, ordered all non-essential ships to leave Alexandria as he was preparing to demolish the port facilities there to prevent their capture by the advancing Panzer Army Africa. Woolwich and the repair ship HMS Resource, escorted by six destroyers, were transferred south of the Suez Canal until the victory at the Second Battle of El Alamein in October allowed them to return to Alexandria. She remained there until late 1943 when she was assigned to the Eastern Fleet and based at Trincomalee for the rest of the war.

Woolwich sailed back to England in 1946, but rejoined the Mediterranean Fleet the following year where she served as flagship for the Flag Officer, Mediterranean Fleet Destroyers. The ship sailed from Valletta, Malta on 7 February 1948 for Harwich where she served as a maintenance and accommodation ship for reserve ships based there. Woolwich was refitted in Rosyth in 1952 and then transferred to Gare Loch to perform similar duties there. She was refitted again in Rosyth five years later and served as an accommodation ship in Devonport from 1958–1962. Woolwich was sold to Arnott Young in 1962 for scrap and arrived at Dalmuir, Scotland, on 18 October to be broken up.
