= Dixie-class destroyer tender =

Class of World War II destroyer tenders

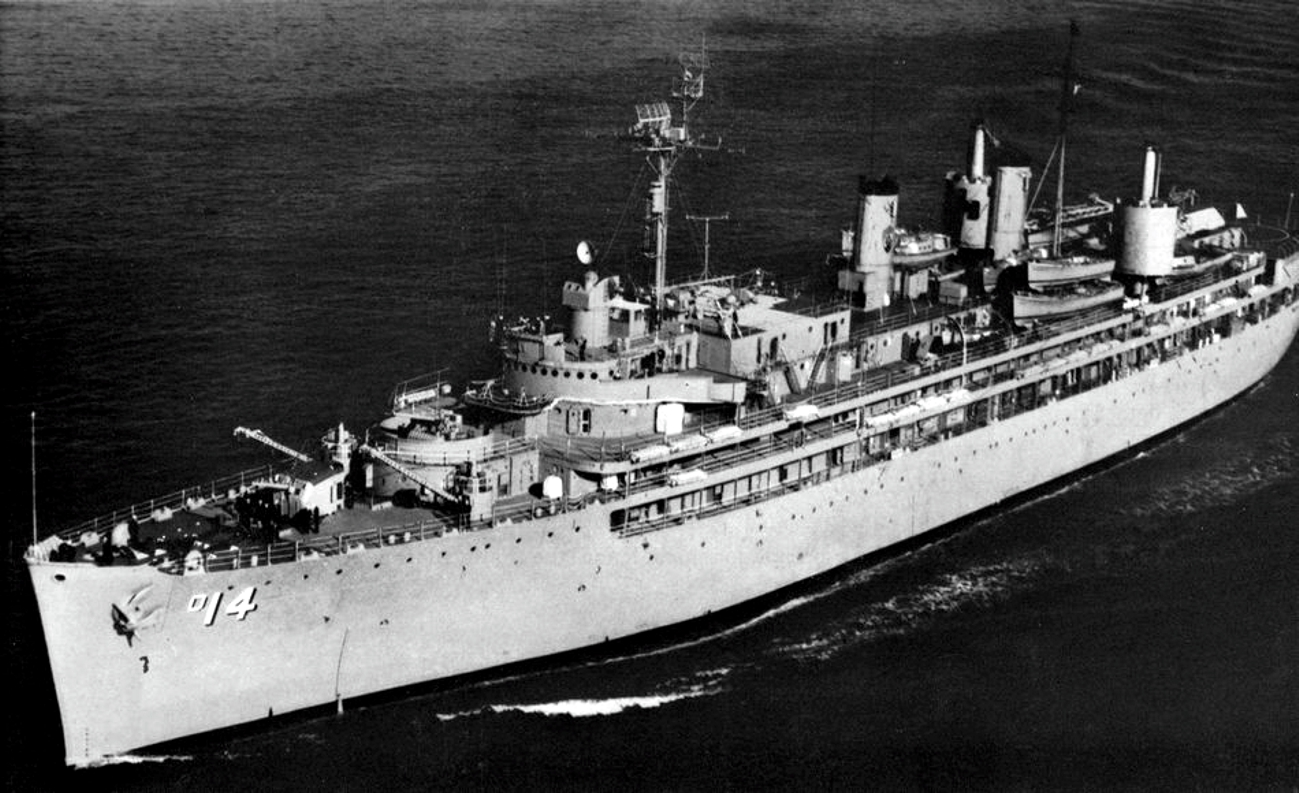
- Dixie underway, c. 1962

Class overview
- Builders: New York Shipbuilding; Tampa Shipbuilding
- Operators: United States Navy Turkish Navy
- Preceded by: Altair-class destroyer tender
- Succeeded by: New England-class destroyer tender (planned); Hamul-class destroyer tender (actual)
- Built: 1939–1943
- In commission: 1940–1994
- Completed: 5
- Retired: 5

General characteristics
- Type: Destroyer tender
- Displacement: 9,450 long tons (9,602 t)
- Length: 530 ft 6 in (161.70 m)
- Beam: 73 ft 3 in (22.33 m)
- Draft: 25 ft 6 in (7.77 m)
- Propulsion: Geared turbine engines; twin screws, 12,000 hp (8,948 kW)
- Speed: 19.6 knots (22.6 mph; 36.3 km/h)
- Complement: 1,262
- Armament: 4 × 5"/38 caliber guns (4 × 1); 8 × Bofors 40 mm gun (4 × 2)

The Dixie class destroyer tender was a class of five United States Navy destroyer tenders used during World War II. This class's design was based on the specifications of USS Dixie (AD-14) and constructed based on drawings for that vessel plus ongoing modifications specified for each continued vessel of the class. The basic hull and superstructure for this class was the same as the Fulton-class submarine tenders and Vulcan-class repair ships.

Towards the end of World War II, a modified Dixie-class destroyer tender was planned, the New England class. New England was laid down on 1 October 1944 by the Tampa Shipbuilding Company, Inc., at Tampa, but the ship's construction was cancelled on 12 August 1945.

== Ships ==
Construction data
Ship name	Hull no.	Builder	Laid down	Launched	Comm.	Decomm.	Fate
Dixie	AD-14	New York Shipbuilding	17 March 1938	27 May 1939	25 April 1940	15 June 1982	Sold for scrap, 17 February 1983
Prairie	AD-15	New York Shipbuilding	7 December 1938	9 December 1939	5 August 1940	26 March 1993	Sold for scrap, 2 April 1993
Piedmont	AD-17	Tampa Shipbuilding Company	1 December 1941	7 December 1942	5 January 1944	30 September 1982	Leased to Turkish Navy 18 October 1982 and later transferred to the Turkish Navy on 17 August 1987 and named "TCG Derya"; Scrapped in 1995
Sierra	AD-18	Tampa Shipbuilding Company	31 December 1941	23 February 1943	20 March 1944	15 October 1993	Sold for scrap, 25 August 1995
Yosemite	AD-19	Tampa Shipbuilding Company	19 January 1942	16 May 1943	26 March 1944	27 January 1994	Sunk as target, 18 November 2003
