= USS New England (AD-32) =

Tender of the United States Navy

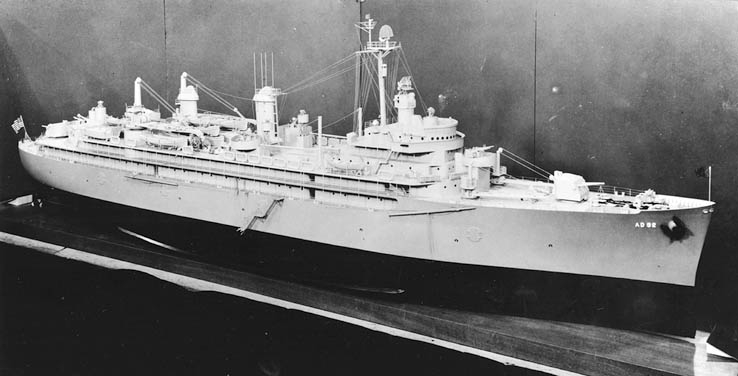

History

United States
- Name: USS New England
- Namesake: New England
- Builder: Tampa Shipbuilding Company, Inc., Tampa, Florida
- Laid down: 1 October 1944
- Launched: Never
- Sponsored by: Mrs. Paul H. Bastedo (planned)
- Completed: Never
- Acquired: Never
- Commissioned: Never
- Fate: Construction cancelled 12 August 1945; scrapped incomplete

General characteristics
- Type: Dixie-class destroyer tender
- Displacement: 11,755 long tons (11,944 t) light; 16,800 long tons (17,070 t) full
- Length: 531 ft (162 m)
- Beam: 74 ft (23 m)
- Draft: 24 ft (7.3 m)
- Propulsion: Steam turbine, two propellers
- Speed: 19.6 knots (36.3 km/h; 22.6 mph)
- Complement: 1017 officers and enlisted
- Armament: 2 × single 5"/38 caliber gun mounts; 8 × single 40 mm AA gun mounts; 12 × single 20 mm guns AA gun mounts

USS New England (AD-32), was a planned destroyer tender of the United States Navy during World War II.

Originally planned as a submarine tender and designated AS-28, New England was reclassified as a destroyer tender and redesignated AD-32 on 14 August 1944; she was named New England on 2 September 1944. The New England-class was to be a modified Dixie class destroyer tender.

New England was laid down on 1 October 1944 by the Tampa Shipbuilding Company, Inc., at Tampa, Florida. She was scheduled to be launched on 1 April 1946 with Mrs. Paul H. Bastedo as her sponsor, but the ship's construction was cancelled on 12 August 1945 when she was 12% complete, due to the end of World War II.

== Bibliography ==
- Egan, Robert S. & Roberts, Stephen S. (1977). "USS New England AD-32". Warship International. XIV (3): 229–238. ISSN 0043-0374.
