= Derya Durmaz =

Turkish actress, writer, producer and director

- Born: September 3, 1973 (age 52); Stuttgart, West Germany
- Citizenship: Turkey
- Website: deryadurmaz.com

Derya Durmaz (born 3 September 1973) is Turkish actress, writer, producer and director.

She was born in Stuttgart, West Germany on 3 September 1973. She holds Turkish citizenship. At university she studied Economy, Human Rights Law and Acting. Her first starring role was in the TV series Eyvah kizim büyüdü starting in 2000. She has acted in over 10 feature length films. Her short film Ziazan won several awards including the Friese Award at the 2014 Hamburg International Short Film Festival, the Special Jury Award and Audience Award at the Diversity in Cannes Short Film Competition in May 2014 and was also featured in an article in the Monocle magazine. In 2015 she starred in the movie Bir Varmış Bir Yokmuş.

She was known for her roles in Ihlamurlar Altında and Gözde Çığacı as of 2013. She also starred in the 2020 Cagil Bocut short Brigitte Bardot for which she was among the recipients of the 2021 Special Jury Award at the Molise Film Festival and the 2021 National Short Film Competition award at the Kayseri Film Festival.

Her film The Bus to Amerika will participate in the 2022 Three Continents Festival (18-27 November).
