= USS Sierra (AD-18) =

Tender of the United States Navy

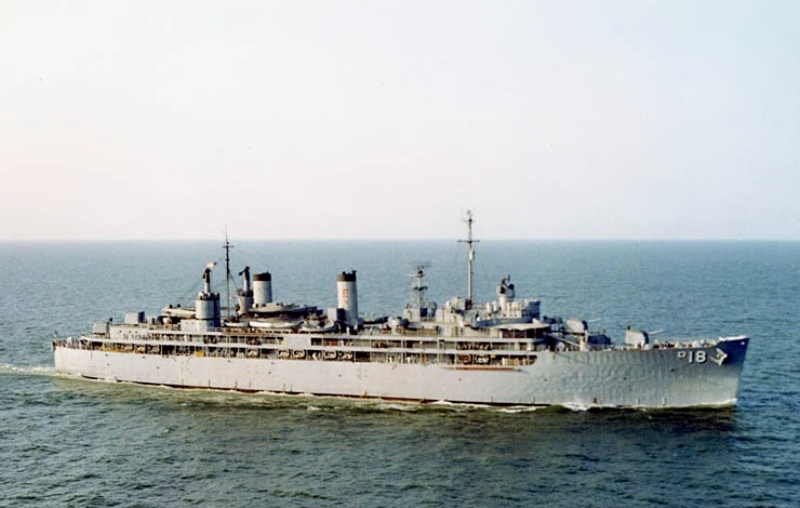
- USS Sierra (AD-18)

History

United States
- Name: USS Sierra
- Namesake: Sierra Nevada mountain range
- Builder: Tampa Shipbuilding Company, Tampa, Florida
- Laid down: 31 December 1941
- Launched: 23 February 1943
- Sponsored by: Mrs F. M. Earle
- Commissioned: 20 March 1944
- Decommissioned: 15 October 1993
- Stricken: 15 October 1993
- Fate: Sold for scrap, 25 August 1995

General characteristics
- Class & type: Dixie-class destroyer tender
- Displacement: 14,037 tons (lt), 17,176 t.(fl)
- Length: 530 ft 6 in
- Beam: 73 ft 4 in
- Draft: 25 ft 6 in
- Propulsion: Geared turbine, twin screws, 11,300 hp
- Speed: 19.6 knots
- Complement: 1,050
- Armament: 4 x 5"/38 caliber dual-purpose guns, 8 x single 40mm guns, 23 x 20mm guns

USS Sierra (AD-18) was a Dixie-class destroyer tender built just before the start of World War II for the U.S. Navy. Her task was to service destroyers in, or near, battle areas and to keep them fit for duty. She was the second U.S. Navy ship to bear the name.

== Construction and commissioning ==
Sierra was laid down on 31 December 1941 by the Tampa Shipbuilding Company of Tampa, Florida, launched on 23 February 1943 and commissioned on 20 March 1944.

== World War II ==
Sierra completed fitting out at Tampa and, on 13 April, sailed for Hampton Roads, Virginia, via Key West, arriving there on 18 April. The next day, she began a 10-day shakedown cruise in the Chesapeake Bay area and a subsequent yard availability period in the Norfolk Navy Yard from 28 April to 17 May.

On 18 May, Sierra stood out of Norfolk en route to San Diego, California, via the Panama Canal Zone. She was in San Diego for five days and, on 7 June, departed for Pearl Harbor. The destroyer tender rendered services to destroyers and destroyer escorts at Pearl Harbor from 13 June to 3 September 1944.

With the need for fleet repair units at advance bases to support the forthcoming invasion of the Philippine Islands, Sierra proceeded to Seeadler Harbor, Manus Island, Admiralty Islands. She was attached to the United States Third Fleet and serviced its ships until February 1945. Her most outstanding accomplishments were the replacement of a complete 5-inch (127-mm) gun mount on the battleship USS California (BB-44) and rebuilding the starboard stern of the destroyer USS Claxton (DD-571), which had been severely damaged by a kamikaze in Leyte Gulf.

Sierra was underway from Seeadler Harbor on 18 February en route to Purvis Bay, Solomon Islands. She repaired a fleet of tank landing ships (LSTs) in preparation for the assault on Iwo Jima and then proceeded, on 15 March, to Ulithi, Caroline Islands. She serviced units of the United States Fifth Fleet there until 25 May when she departed for San Pedro Bay, Philippines, on Leyte Gulf.

=== After hostilities ===
Sierra repaired landing craft support ships and destroyers for the anticipated invasion of the Japanese mainland, but the end of hostilities with Japan on 15 August 1945 ended the assignment. The ship sailed from the Philippine Islands on 6 September for Buckner Bay (Nakagusuku Bay), Okinawa; Jinsen (Incheon), Korea; and Shanghai, China. She arrived at Shanghai on 12 October 1945 and remained there until 6 February 1946 when she sailed to San Francisco, California for yard availability.

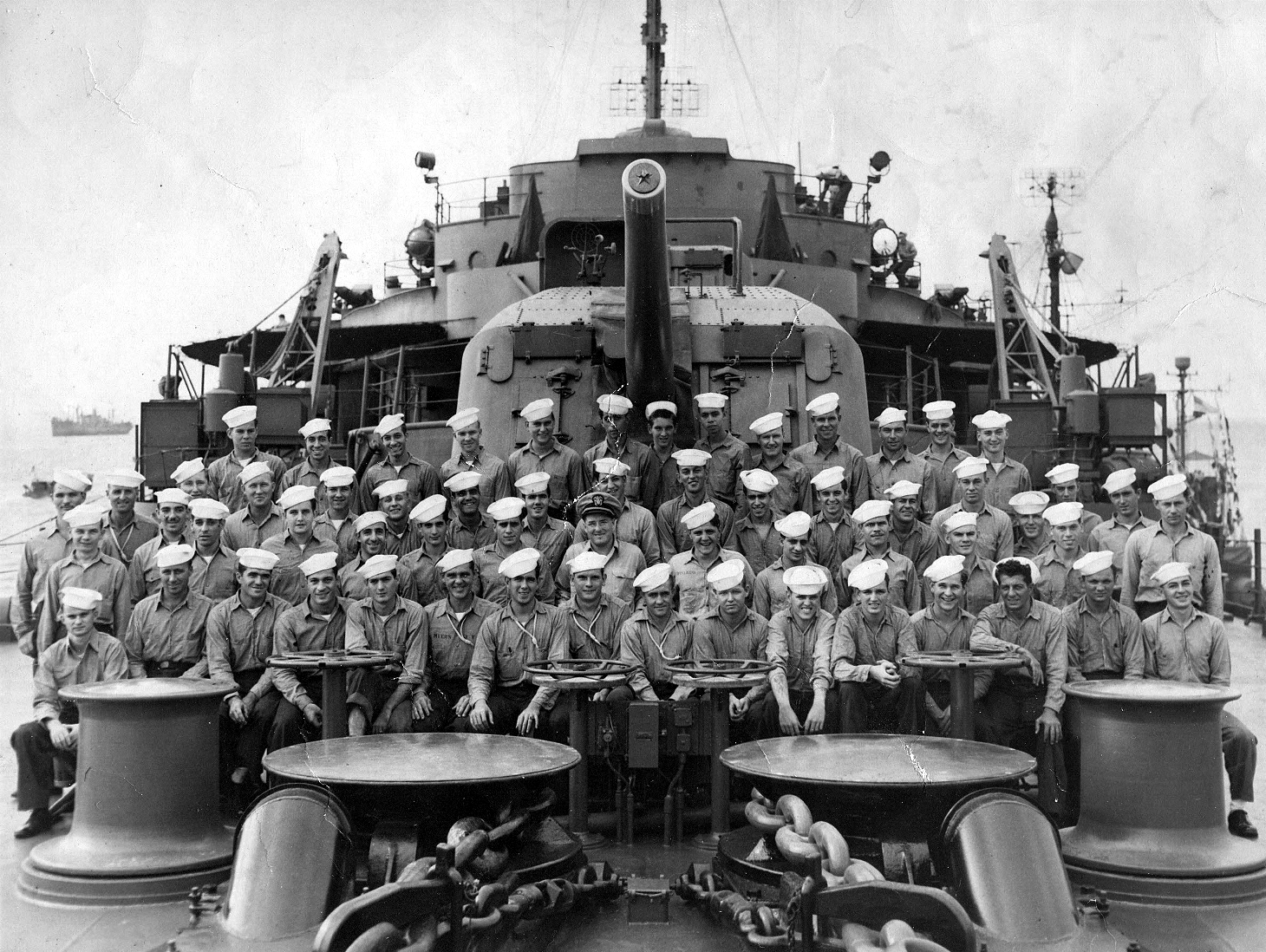
USS Sierra, AD-18, in Shanghai, China. October 12th, 1946.

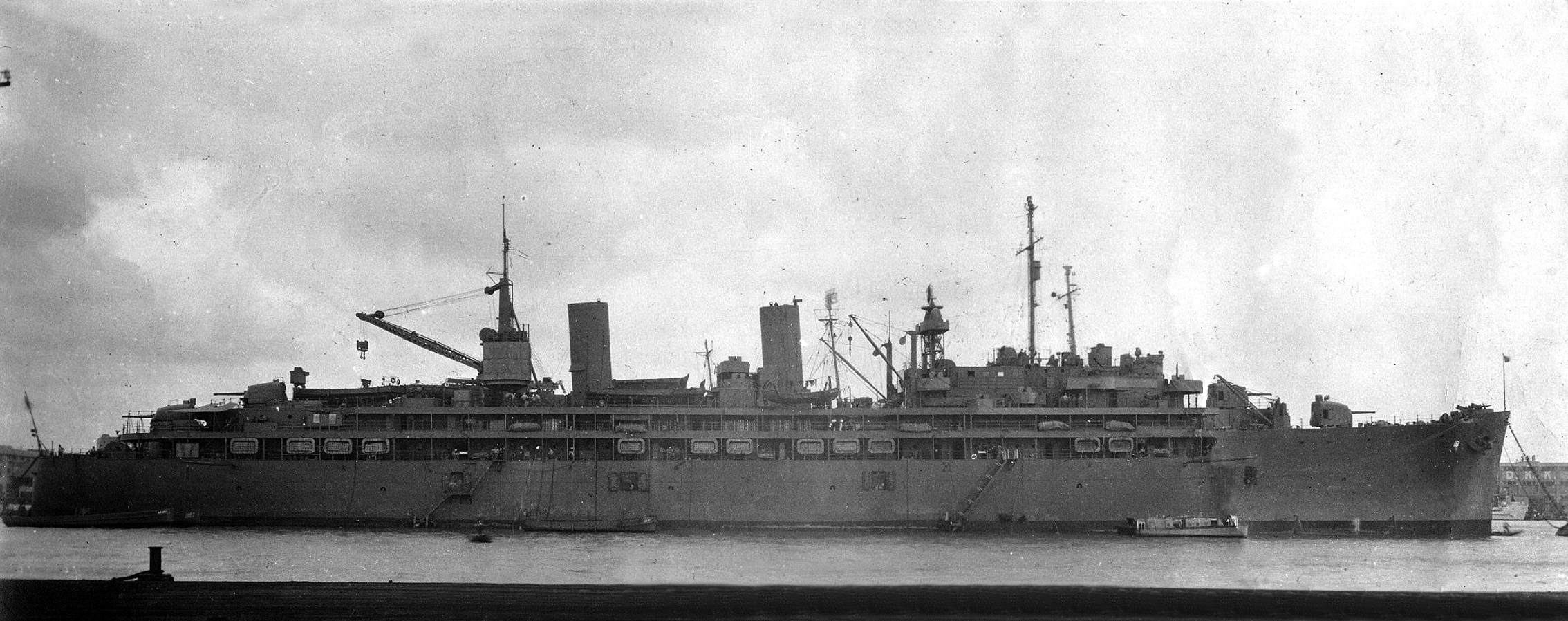
USS Sierra, AD-18, in Shanghai, China. October 12th, 1946.

== Postwar service ==
Sierra was deployed to the Western Pacific two more times in the next three years. Her last assignment terminated at San Diego, California on 8 April 1949; and, two months later, she sailed for Norfolk, Virginia, which was her new home port, arriving there on 29 July 1949. She serviced ships there until 6 January 1950 when she was deployed to the United States Sixth Fleet in the Mediterranean Sea as relief of the destroyer tender USS Shenandoah (AD-26), returning to Norfolk on 24 June. The tender was deployed to the Sixth Fleet again from 12 June to 6 November 1951.

Upon her return to Norfolk, Sierra moored at Pier 21, Destroyer Submarine Piers(D&S Piers). On 7 November, she was designated the flagship of Commander, Destroyer Flotilla 4 and retained this honor until 1 July 1962 when she was assigned as flagship for Commander, Cruiser Destroyer Flotilla 4. Sierra remained at Norfolk until 1959, aptly coping with the heavy demand by destroyers for repairs, which was her primary duty. For other than local operations, the longest period of time that she was away from the D&S Piers was when her services were required for Operation Springboard from 6 January to 2 March and again from 9 November to 4 December 1953.

Sierra sailed for the Mediterranean on 30 June 1959 for her third deployment with the Sixth Fleet and returned to Norfolk on 13 December to continue her work as destroyer tender. She was deployed to Guantanamo Bay, Cuba, from 23 October to 14 December 1961 to tend the reserve training ships recalled to active duty during the Berlin Wall Crisis.

=== Modernization ===
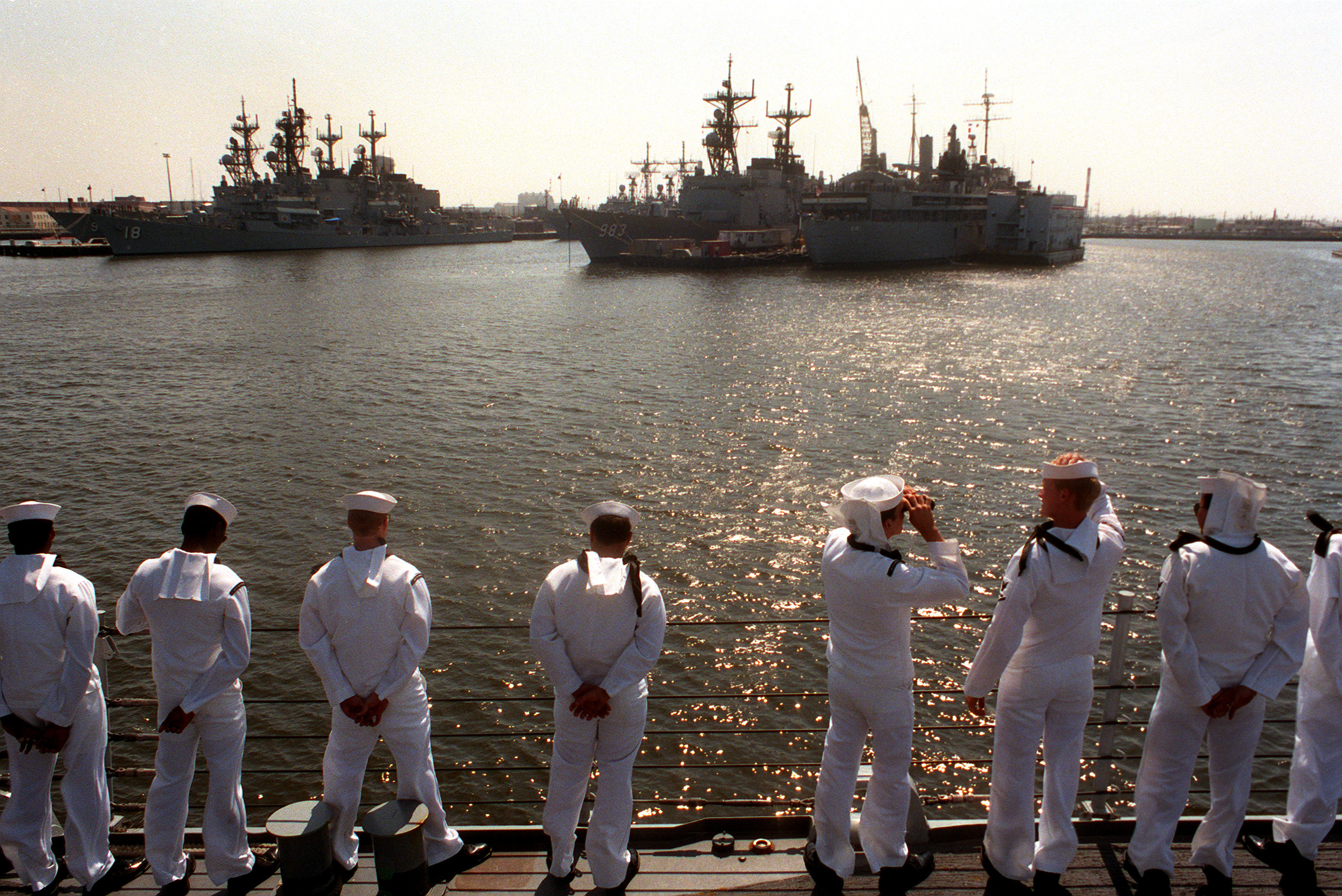
USS Sierra at Charleston, South Carolina, in 1991.

Sierra entered the Norfolk Naval Shipyard on 27 March 1962 for conversion under the FRAM II program. Sierra was out of the yard and able to resume her normal work routine on 15 September. From 1963 through December 1973, Sierra serviced ships of the fleet at ports along the United States East Coast, but primarily at Norfolk.

On 5 January 1974, she moved to Charleston, South Carolina, which became her home port for the next few years. During that time, Sierra made two peacetime Mediterranean cruises in 1977 and 1978/79 and visited Spain, Mallorca, mainland Italy, Sicily, and the French Riviera. Her home port, for both cruises while in Italy, was Naples.

=== Overhaul and hurricane assistance ===
In September 1979, Sierra cruised one day behind Hurricane Frederic on her way to a shipyard in Mobile, Alabama, for an overhaul. The overhaul included the addition of female berthing quarters for the first female officers that began serving on the ship. During the first several months in drydock, her crew assisted the City of Mobile to help in cleanup and relief efforts after Hurricane Frederic. The crew received the Humanitarian Medal for their efforts in Mobile.

https://en.m.wikipedia.org/wiki/Hurricane_Davidmobile after the hurricane

In 1981, Sierra returned to Charleston for a short visit prior to going to Guantanamo Bay for exercises to get the crew ready for service. During the aftermath of Hurricane Andrew in 1992, Sierra and her crew assisted the South Florida community with hurricane assistance including the reconstruction of Pine Lake Elementary in South Dade County.

=== Don't Tread On Me ===
Sierra was the oldest active duty warship prior to her decommissioning on 15 October 1993. As such, she was entitled to fly the First Navy Jack flag denoting her as such.

== Decommissioning ==
Sierra was decommissioned on 15 October 1993 and was sold for scrapping.
