= TCG Derya (A-1590) =

Turkish Navy auxiliary ship

Class overview
- Name: Derya class
- Builders: Sefine Shipyard
- Operators: Turkish Navy
- Built: 2018–2024
- In commission: 2024–present
- Completed: 1
- Active: 1

History

Turkey
- Name: Derya
- Laid down: 2018
- Launched: October 2021
- Commissioned: 19 January 2024
- Identification: Hull number: A-1590
- Status: In active service

General characteristics
- Type: Auxiliary ship
- Displacement: 26,000 long tons (26,000 t)
- Length: 194.80 m (639 ft 1 in)
- Beam: 23.40 m (76 ft 9 in)
- Propulsion: 2 × General Electric LM2500 gas turbines, 2 × Diesel engines; 2 × Electric motors
- Speed: 24 knots (44 km/h; 28 mph)
- Range: 4,500 nmi (8,300 km; 5,200 mi)
- Endurance: +30 days
- Capacity: 9,000 long tons (9,100 t) F-76 fuel; 1,000 long tons (1,000 t) F-44 fuel; 800 long tons (810 t) fresh water; 48 containers
- Complement: 326
- Sensors & processing systems: Aselsan MAR-D 3D Surveillance radar, Havelsan ADVENT naval combat management system
- Armor: 2 × Aselsan GOKDENIZ 35 mm Close-in weapon system (CIWS); 2 × 25 mm Aselsan STOP remote weapon stations
- Aircraft carried: 3 × Helicopters
- Aviation facilities: Helipad, hangar

TCG Derya (A-1590) is a Turkish fast combat support auxiliary ship of type replenishment oiler of the Turkish Naval Forces, commissioned in January 2024.

== History ==
In 2016, the Defence Industry Agency (SSB) of the Ministry of National Defense launched a project for the building of an auxiliary ship to meet the needs of the Turkish Naval Forces. The vessel is to provide oil, water, provisions, spare parts, medical supplies, ammunition, etc. to multiple ships at the same time during operations in the high seas and transoceanic waters. It was planned that the ship would serve also as a command and control ship in wartime with its effective combat management capacity.

A contract was signed between the SSB and Sefine Shipyard on 10 July 2018. For the building of the ship, 58 months were planned. State-owned defense companies Aselsan and Havelsan were subcontractors of the shipyard. A domestic contribution rate of 77% was targeted in the project.

In later years, the technical characteristics of the ship were extended, and the initially planned armament changed to more contemporary weapons. The ship was launched from the Sefine Shipyard in Altınova, Yalova Province in October 2021. After successfully completing acceptance tests, she entered service in a ceremony on 19 January 2024, named TCG Derya and with hull number A-1590. She is the second auxiliary ship with the same name following TCG Derya (A-576), ex USS Piedmont (AD–17), which served between 1982 and 1994 in the Turkish Navy.

== Characteristics ==
Derya provides replenishment at sea for solid, liquid materials and ammunition. She can be used in intelligence gathering, search and rescue and humanitarian evacuation operations as well as natural disaster relief tasks.

The ship is 194.80 m (639 ft 1 in) long and has a beam of 23.40 m (76 ft 9 in) and a displacement tonnage 26,000 long tons (26,000 t). She has a maximum speed of 24 knots (44 km/h; 28 mph), an operation range of 4,500 nautical miles (8,300 km; 5,200 mi) with more than 30 days of endurance at sea. The ship's refuel capacities are 9,000 long tons (9,100 t) for F-76 fuel, 1,000 long tons (1,000 t) for F-44 fuel and 800 long tons (810 t) for fresh water. She can carry 48 containers. The vessel is powered by two General Electric LM2500 gas turbines, two diesel engines and two electric motors. She is equipped with Aselsan MAR-D surveillance radar, Havelsan ADVENT naval combat management system. The total number of the ship's crew is 326. The vessel is armed with one Aselsan GOKDENIZ 35 mm close-in weapon system (CIWS) at the bow and one at the stem, two 25 mm Aselsan STOP remote weapon stations. She carries three helicopters, one on the helipad and two in the hangar.
