= USS Yosemite (AD-19) =

Tender of the United States Navy

Coordinates: 35°54′N 70°04′W

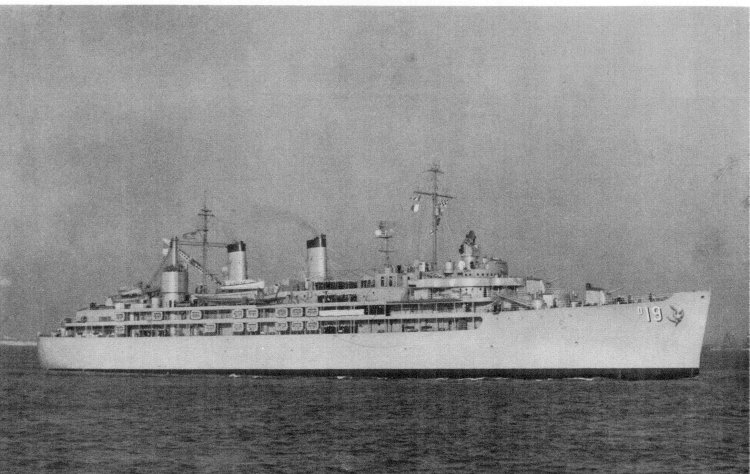
- USS Yosemite (AD-19)

History

United States
- Name: USS Yosemite
- Namesake: Yosemite Valley
- Builder: Tampa Shipbuilding
- Laid down: 19 January 1942
- Launched: 16 May 1943
- Sponsored by: Mrs. Melville W. Powers
- Commissioned: 26 March 1944
- Decommissioned: 27 January 1994
- Nickname(s): The Yo-yo
- Fate: Sunk as target, 18 November 2003

General characteristics
- Class & type: Dixie-class destroyer tender
- Displacement: 14,037 tons (lt), 17,176 t.(fl)
- Length: 530 ft 6 in
- Beam: 73 ft 4 in
- Draft: 25 ft 6 in
- Propulsion: Geared turbine, twin screws, 11,300 hp
- Speed: 19.6 knots
- Complement: 1,076
- Armament: 4 x 5"/38 caliber dual-purpose guns, 8 x single 40mm guns, 23 x 20mm guns

USS Yosemite (AD-19) was a Dixie-class destroyer tender built during World War II for the U.S. Navy. Her task was to service destroyers in, or near, battle areas and to keep them fit for duty.

The fourth U.S. Navy ship to bear the name, Yosemite was laid down on 19 January 1942 by the Tampa Shipbuilding Company at Tampa, Florida; launched on 16 May 1943; sponsored by Mrs. Melville W. Powers; and commissioned on 25 March 1944.

== World War II ==
Between late March and mid-June 1944, the destroyer tender was fitted out at Tampa. On 21 June, she got underway for the Virginia Capes, steamed via Key West, and arrived at Hampton Roads on the 26th. For the next 10 days, the destroyer tender conducted shakedown training in Chesapeake Bay and then put into Norfolk for additional outfitting and some modifications to her below-deck spaces.

Early in August, she made a voyage to Fort Pond Bay, New York, to load torpedoes. On the 6th, she headed south to Guantanamo Bay and thence proceeded to the Panama Canal Zone, transited the Panama Canal, and arrived at Balboa on the 13th. From there, the ship continued her voyage west to Hawaii and arrived in Pearl Harbor on 29 August.

=== Pacific Theatre ===
As soon as she moored, Yosemite went to work. For the next six months, the ship's company made repairs on over 200 ships. She remained at Oahu until February 1945. On the 15th, she exited the harbor and set a course for Eniwetok Atoll in the Caroline Islands. She arrived there on the 22d but remained for only five days before moving farther westward to the forward base at Ulithi Atoll. She entered the Ulithi anchorage on 3 March, and her crew set again to work repairing the veteran ships of the war in the Pacific.

On 25 May, Yosemite departed Ulithi in a convoy bound for Leyte Gulf in the Philippines. She arrived in San Pedro Bay on the 28th and resumed her work supporting the Fleet in its march toward Japan. She remained at Leyte through the end of the war but, soon thereafter, got underway for Japan.

=== After hostilities ===
The destroyer tender arrived in Sasebo on 22 September and began tending ships assigned to the occupation forces in the Far East. That assignment lasted until March 1946. On the 15th, she stood out of Yokosuka on her way home. Yosemite transited the Panama Canal in mid-April and arrived in New York on the 22nd.

== Postwar service ==
Soon after her arrival back in the United States, Yosemite became the flagship for the Commander, Destroyers, United States Atlantic Fleet. Except for several brief interruptions for shipyard overhauls, she served in that capacity from 17 June 1946 until the spring of 1962. During that 16-year period, she spent most of her time in port at Newport, Rhode Island, though on occasion she did make voyages to the West Indies.

In addition, near the end of that stretch of time, the destroyer tender made two overseas deployments. In June 1958, she voyaged to northern Europe for the purpose of tending ships engaged in an exercise in the North Atlantic. Later, on 17 March 1959, she again departed Newport for a brief tour of duty tending the ships of the United States Sixth Fleet. She concluded that assignment when she returned to Newport on 24 July and resumed duty as tender to the Atlantic Fleet destroyers and as flagship for their type commander.

=== Cuban Missile Crisis ===
On 1 April 1962, Yosemite's role changed somewhat when the Atlantic Fleet cruisers and destroyers were brought together into a single type command. At that time, she became flagship for the new command, Cruiser-Destroyer Force, Atlantic Fleet. Late that fall, during the Cuban Missile Crisis and the American quarantine of the island, Yosemite departed Newport for a time and headed south via Norfolk to Kingston, Jamaica, where she tended the ships engaged in that operation. In December, she returned to Newport and resumed her normal schedule.

Over the next six years, the destroyer tender remained at Newport except for occasional overhauls and for short voyages to the West Indies early each year to tend Atlantic Fleet ships participating in the annual "Springboard" exercise.

=== Resumption of overseas deployments ===
In 1969, the complexion of her operations changed somewhat. In April, she resumed overseas deployments after a hiatus of 10 years. She departed Newport on 7 April and arrived in Naples, Italy on the 19th. During that tour of duty in the Mediterranean, she served as flagship for the Commander, Service Force, 6th Fleet. The repair ship USS Grand Canyon (AR-28) relieved her of tender duties on 14 August, the Service Force commander shifted his flag to the oiler USS Mississinewa (AO-144), and Yosemite sailed for the United States on the 15th.

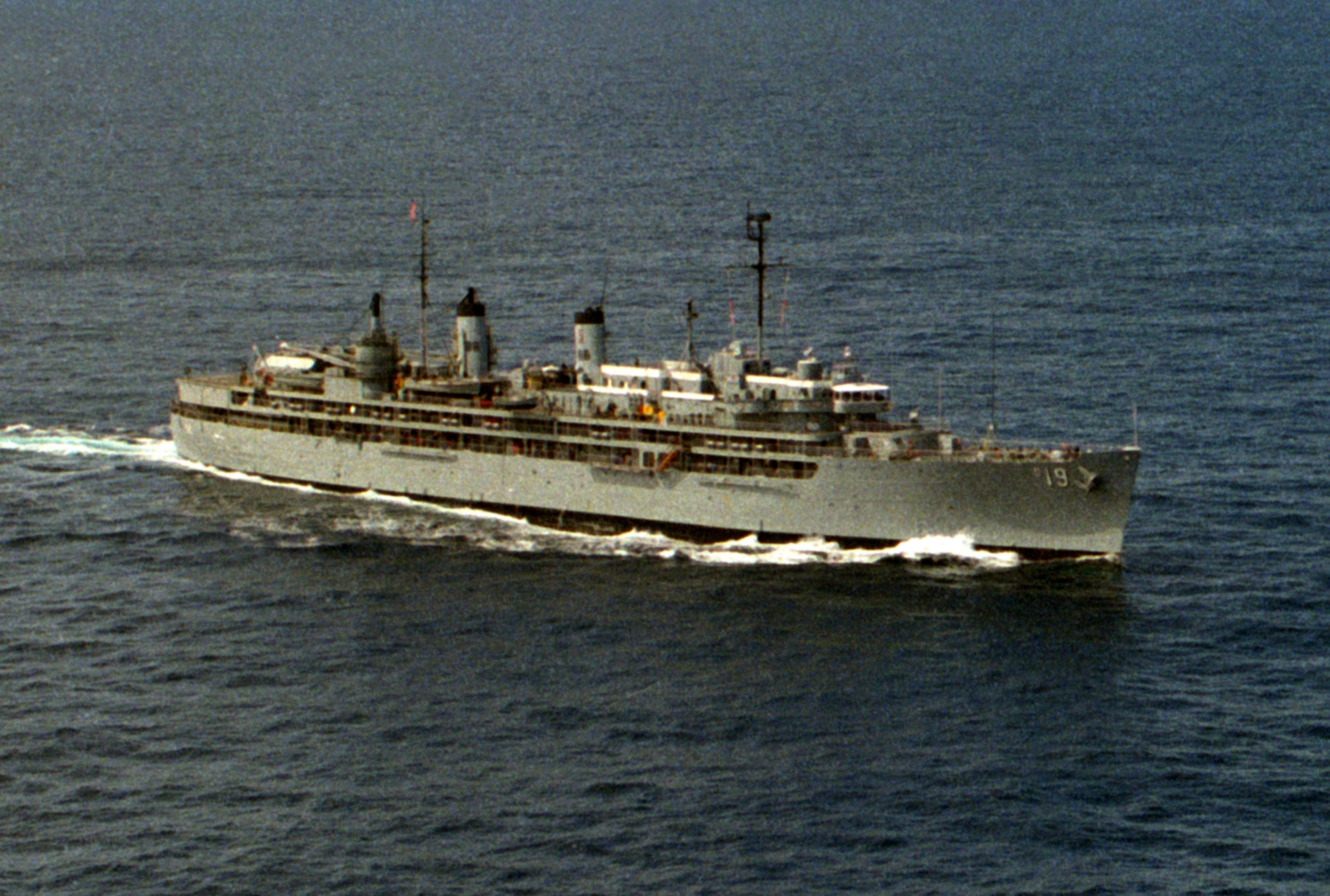
USS Yosemite in 1988.

On the voyage home, she took on board a badly burned West German seaman from SS Sinclair Venezuela and transported him to the naval hospital at Newport. On 24 October, Yosemite's home port was changed from Newport, Rhode Island, to Naval Station Mayport, Florida; and the destroyer tender got underway for that city three days later. The ship arrived at Mayport on the 30th and began tending ships.

Yosemite was then based at Mayport, serving as flagship for various units of the Cruiser-Destroyer Force, Atlantic Fleet—notably Cruiser-Destroyer Flotilla 2 and Cruiser Destroyer Group 12. She made two additional deployments to the Mediterranean, one from July to December 1974 and the second from September 1977 to March 1978. She resumed tender duties at Mayport on 12 March 1978, continuing to engage in those duties through the 1980s. Her final deployment was to the Persian Gulf as part of the ongoing Operation Desert Storm campaign, departing Mayport in October, 1991, with stops in Bahrain and the U.A.E., returning in March, 1992. She was decommissioned in 1994.

== Decommissioning ==
Yosemite was decommissioned and stricken from the Naval Vessel Register on 27 January 1994, and from December 1999, was at the Naval Inactive Ship Maintenance Facility (NISMF) at Portsmouth, Virginia, awaiting sale to a foreign government.

During drydocking of the aircraft carrier USS Enterprise (CVN-65) in 2002, Enterprise crew members from the reactor department removed berthing and other small components from Yosemite for re-use aboard Enterprise.

== Final disposition ==
On 18 November 2003, Yosemite was expended as a target and sunk at location 35.54 degrees North, 070.04 degrees West, sunk at a depth of 2,340 fathoms (14,040 feet; 4,280 meters).

== Awards ==
During her 50-year service, USS Yosemite earned the Navy Meritorious Unit Commendation (2), Battle "E" Ribbon (5), Navy Expeditionary Medal, American Campaign Medal, Asiatic-Pacific Campaign Medal, World War II Victory Medal, Navy Occupation Service Medal (with Asia clasp), National Defense Service Medal, Armed Forces Expeditionary Medal, Southwest Asia Service Medal, Sea Service Deployment Ribbon and Philippines Liberation Medal
