= USS Prairie (AD-15) =

Tender of the United States Navy

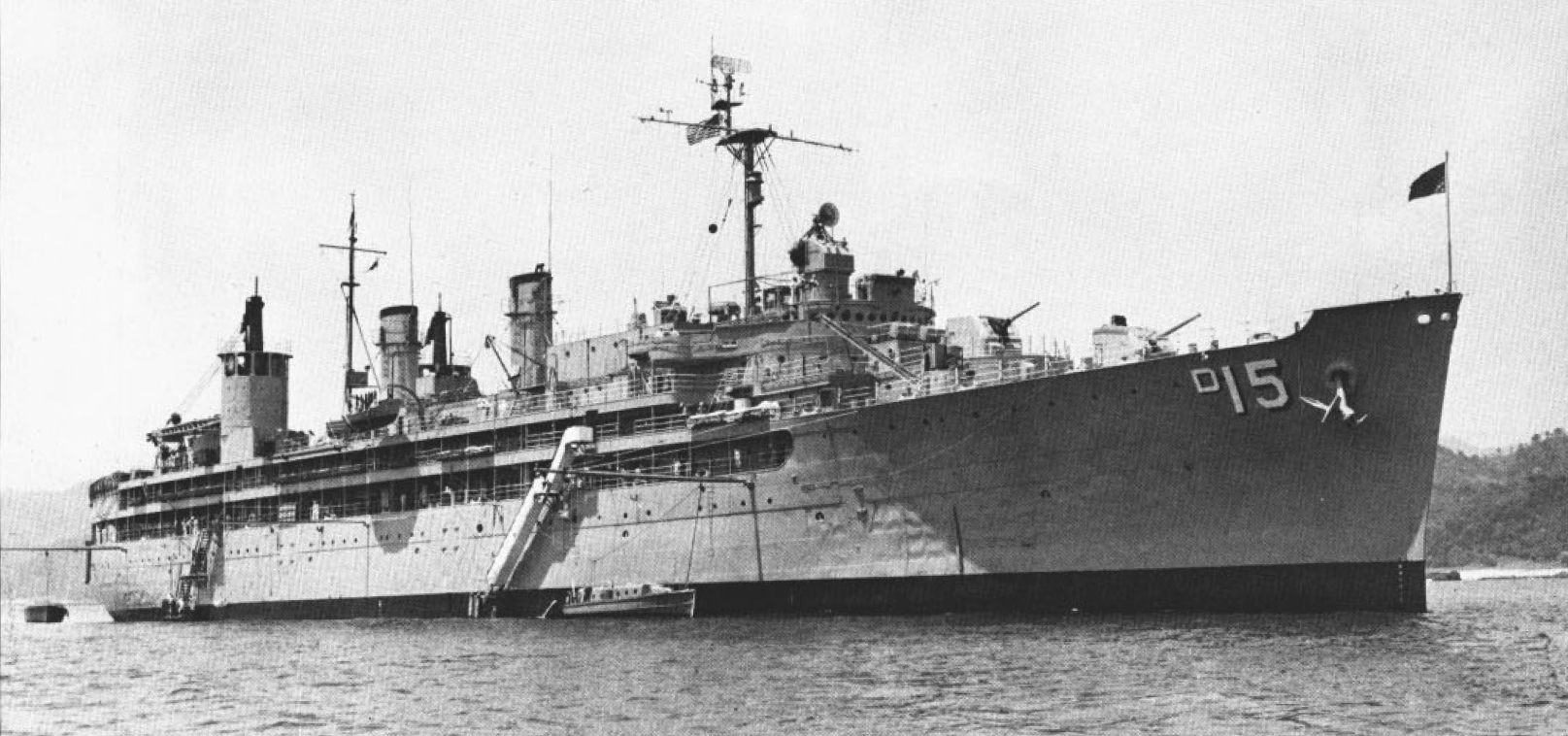
- USS Prairie

History

United States
- Name: Prairie
- Builder: New York Shipbuilding
- Laid down: 7 December 1938
- Launched: 9 December 1939
- Sponsored by: Mrs. Samuel M. Robinson
- Commissioned: 5 August 1940
- Decommissioned: 26 March 1993
- Stricken: 26 March 1993
- Fate: Scrapped

General characteristics
- Class & type: Dixie-class destroyer tender
- Displacement: 16,500 tons
- Length: 530.5 ft (161.7 m)
- Beam: 73.3 ft (22.3 m)
- Draft: 24.5 ft (7.5 m)
- Speed: 18 knots (33.3 km/h)
- Complement: 698 officers and men
- Armament: 4 × 5 in (130 mm) / 38 caliber guns; 4 × 40 mm guns

USS Prairie (AD–15) was a Dixie-class destroyer tender built before World War II for the U.S. Navy. Her task was to service destroyers in or near battle areas and keep them fit for duty. Before U.S. entry into World War II, Prairie cruised between Atlantic ports from Colon, C.Z. to Argentia, Newfoundland. She was docked at Naval Station Argentia, tending Allied ships, on 7 December 1941 as the first direct blows of World War II struck the United States.

She was laid down on 7 December 1938 by New York Shipbuilding, Camden, New Jersey; launched on 9 December 1939; sponsored by Mrs. Samuel M. Robinson; and commissioned on 5 August 1940.

== World War II Pacific Theatre operations ==
A floating workshop for American and other Allied destroyers, Prairie was “mother ship” to a squadron of destroyers at Argentia, the Atlantic terminus of the transatlantic convoy route. A fire from Spry (PG-64), secured astern of Prairie, spread to the tender 29 May 1942 and caused extensive damage. However, in his memoirs entitled U-Boat Killer, Captain Donald McIntyre, RN, attributes the fire to a leak in the supply pipe through which petrol was pumped along the wooden jetty that Prairie was secured. After repairing in Boston, Prairie returned to Argentia. On 22 February 1943, U.S. Coast Guard cutter Campbell (WPG-32) was rammed during an engagement with a German submarine; Prairie provided a complete overhaul, and Campbell sailed to the United States on 27 May.

Departing Argentia on 23 September, Prairie steamed to Boston and Pearl Harbor in November, to remain until February 1944. She departed Pearl Harbor on 7 February to move with advancing forces in operations against the Marshall Islands. Lying in sheltered waters, Prairie tended destroyers throughout the remainder of the war. Majuro Atoll had been secured on 7 February, and Prairie arrived there on the 13th to remain at this advantageous point for mobile supply during the costly campaign for Tarawa. Departing Majuro on 3 June, she steamed to Eniwetok, where she was while fighting progressed in the Mariana and Carolines. Reporting to Ulithi 8 October, Prairie was at war's end and remained until 1 October 1945, when she steamed to Tokyo Bay. On 30 November, she steamed home to San Francisco.

== Korean War operations ==
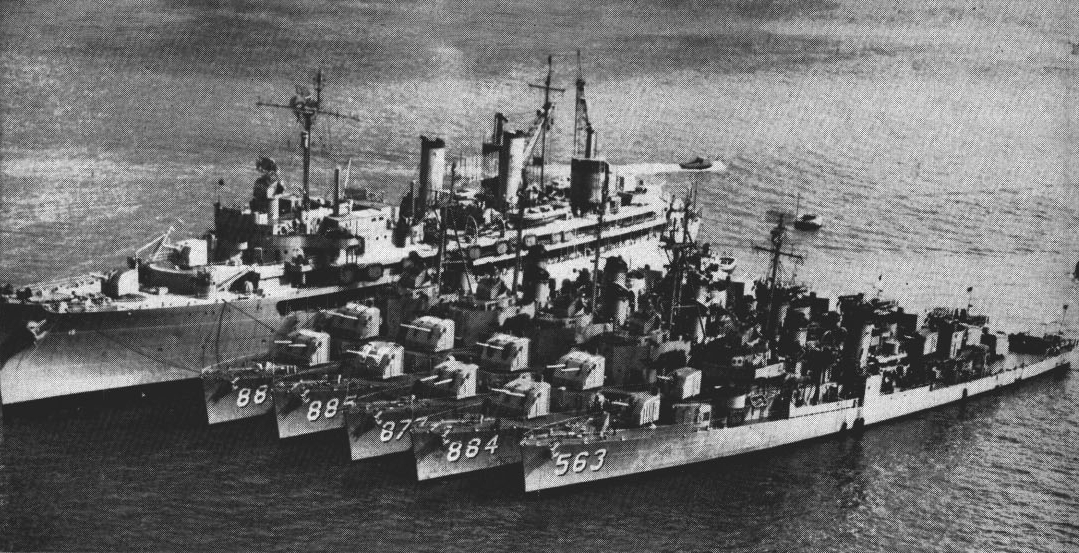
Prairie tied up with USS Ross (DD-563) and other destroyers in the 1950s.

Prairie steamed to San Diego, destroyer force headquarters, 16 February 1946 and remained there until 11 August 1947. The Korean War demanded more hurried operations from Prairie, and she sailed to provide tending services for U.N. forces from 2 February to 3 August 1951 and again from 6 April to 10 September 1952, and from late August 1953 to 11 April 1954.

== Post-Korean War operations ==
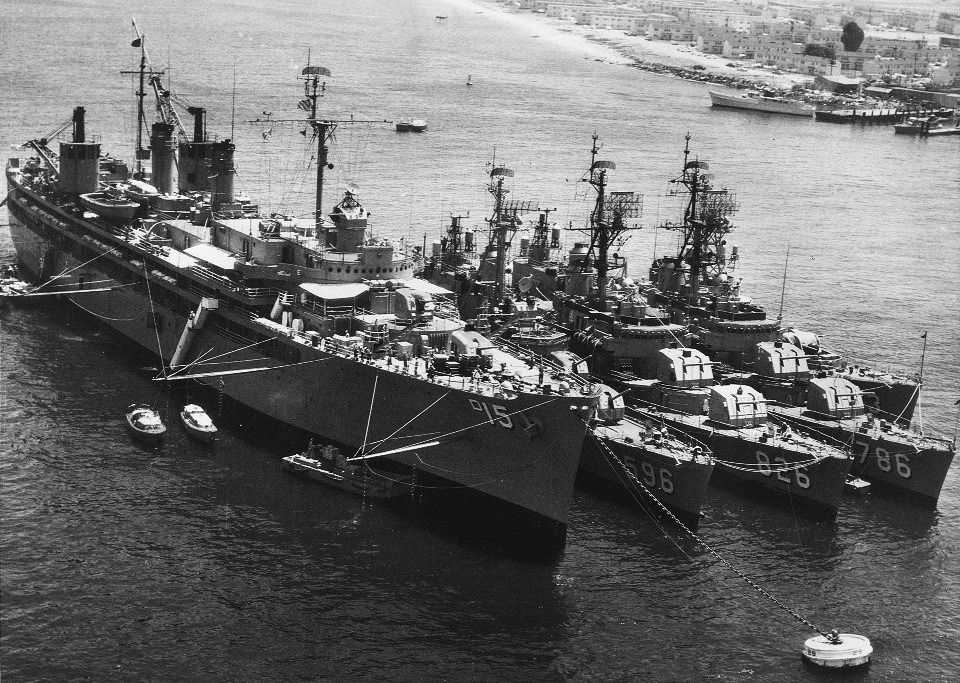
Prairie with destroyers at San Diego in 1963.

After this increased activity, Prairie continued to provide repair, supply, and medical services to ships of the 7th Fleet. In 1957, the tender returned to San Diego after completing an around-the-world cruise, a rarity for a destroyer tender. In 1958, Prairie steamed to Yokohama on 8 May for the ceremonies at which Yokohama and San Diego became sister cities. In October 1959, she steamed to Taiwan for the “10–10 Day” festival, similar to U.S. Independence Day for the Nationalist Chinese.

In Spring 1961, the tender participated in the “Pony Express” exercises held by SEATO forces. She returned to Pearl Harbor on 15 July 1966 for her first visit in over 20 years; she repaired over 100 vessels there before departing the area on 6 December. During a 6-month tour at Pearl Harbor beginning in July 1967, Prairie rescued survivors from the yacht Anobell in turbulent waters 600 miles off Hawaii on 11 December and transported them to San Diego.

In 1968, Prairie added a People-to-People program to her schedule of duties while in Taiwan. As part of that program, her crew painted a new orphanage and provided dental care to remote island areas.

Prairie was decommissioned on 26 March 1993 at Long Beach, California, after over 52 years of service. She was later towed to Singapore and sold for scrap. At the time of her decommissioning, she was the longest-serving ship in the U.S. Navy other than USS Constitution.

== External Websites ==
Website of USS Prairie AD-15

Booklet of General Plans, 1968
