= USS Piedmont =

Tender of the United States Navy

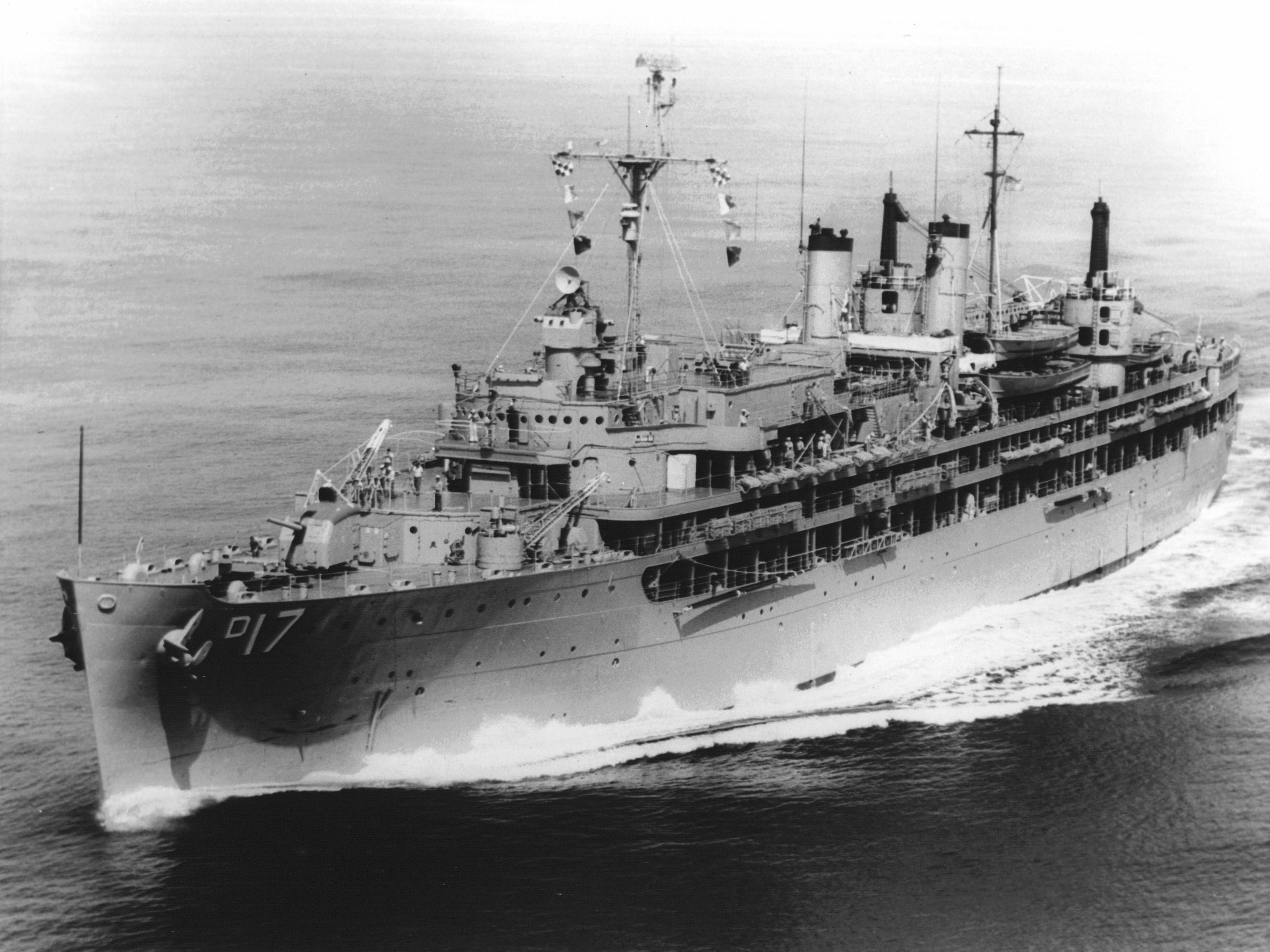

History

United States
- Name: USS Piedmont
- Namesake: The Piedmont, a plateau region in the eastern United States
- Builder: Tampa Shipbuilding Company, Tampa, Florida, U.S.
- Laid down: 1 December 1941
- Launched: 7 December 1942
- Sponsored by: Mrs. Elsa Kauffman
- Commissioned: 5 January 1944
- Decommissioned: 30 September 1982
- Stricken: 6 August 1987
- Fate: Leased to Turkish Navy on 18 October 1982; Transferred to the Turkish Navy on 17 August 1987; Deleted from Turkish Navy's register in 1994; Scrapped in 1995
- Notes: Served in Turkish Navy as TCG Derya 1982–1994

General characteristics
- Class & type: Dixie-class destroyer tender
- Type: Destroyer tender
- Displacement: 17,176 tons (full load)
- Length: 530 ft 6 in (161.70 m)
- Beam: 73 ft 3 in (22.33 m)
- Draft: 25 ft (7.6 m)
- Propulsion: Geared turbine engines; twin screws; 11,300 h.p.
- Speed: 18.5 knots (max); 12 knots (econ)
- Complement: 1,181
- Armament: 4 × 1 5"/38 caliber gun; 23 × 1 Oerlikon 20 mm cannon; 4 × 2 Bofors 40 mm L/60 gun

USS Piedmont (AD–17) was a Dixie-class destroyer tender built during World War II for the United States Navy. Its task was to service destroyers in, or near, battle areas and to keep them fit for duty. It served in the Pacific Ocean during World War II, the Cold War, the Korean War, and the Vietnam War. For its work in battle areas, the ship was awarded four battle stars for its Korean War efforts and one for Vietnam War service.

It was laid down by the Tampa Shipbuilding Company, Inc., in Tampa, Florida, on 1 December 1941; launched 7 December 1942; sponsored by Mrs. Elsa Kauffman; and, commissioned 5 January 1944.

The ship's mascot was the Doc, one of the dwarfs in Disney's Snow White and the Seven Dwarfs. Due to the mascot being a male character, Piedmont was officially referred to as "He", rather than "She", as is the tradition with ships.

After being decommissioned from the U.S. Navy, Piedmont was transferred to the Turkish Navy, where it served from 1982 to 1994 as TCG Derya. The ship was decommissioned from the Turkish Navy in 1994 and scrapped the following year.

== History ==
=== World War II and the Pacific Theater ===
Early in February 1944, Piedmont stood out from Tampa, Florida, on its shakedown cruise. On 6 March it sailed for the Panama Canal, San Diego, and Pearl Harbor, Hawaii. Less than 24 hours after its arrival at Pearl Harbor, Piedmont had taken its first United States Pacific Fleet destroyer alongside. Piedmont remained at Pearl Harbor throughout the months of April and May during the feverish preparations for the Marianas campaign. At one time, Piedmont had seven destroyers alongside and was working on jobs for more than 50 other destroyers moored in the stream.

==== Servicing the Mobile Fleet ====
Piedmont sailed from Pearl Harbor to join the fleet in the Marshall Islands in mid-June. July and August were months of great fleet activity at Eniwetok. Periodically, task groups from the huge Task Force 58, which was supporting the Marianas campaign, returned to Eniwetok for rest, replenishment, and repairs. Unlike the duty at Pearl Harbor, all jobs were now a race against the calendar and, in addition, shore facilities were no longer available. During the month of July, 99 ships were provisioned with 888 tons of stores. The month of August turned out much the same with ships returning from the invasion of Guam.

In September 1944, with the Central Pacific campaign virtually completed, Piedmont sailed into the Southwest Pacific with the rest of the fleet in preparation for the Philippines campaign. By early December, damaged ships began returning to Manus and USS Saufley (DD-465) and USS Killen (DD-593), both severely damaged by Japanese suicide planes, were assigned to Piedmont for repairs.

==== Mount Hood explosion ====
On the morning of 10 November 1944, while anchored in Seeadler Harbor, Piedmont heard two explosions to port. USS Mount Hood (AE-11), lying about 3,500 yards (3,200 m) away, had blown up. No trace of Mount Hood remained. Between Mount Hood and Piedmont, USS Mindanao (ARG-3) was anchored and took terrible punishment from the explosion. Fire and rescue parties were immediately dispatched from Piedmont to Mindanao and ships alongside. Though Piedmont suffered only superficial damage from the explosion, numerous 5-inch (130 mm) projectiles and steel fragments flew over Mindanao and landed on Piedmont's decks and superstructure, most of them ricocheting off. One man suffered fatal injuries from a direct hit by the base of a 5-inch (130 mm) shell. One 250 pound aerial bomb penetrated the movie locker on the boat deck while another pierced the forecastle and plowed through a tier of bunks. Fortunately, neither bomb exploded and remarkably enough, personnel in both compartments escaped injury.

==== Support Philippine Invasion operations ====
Lingayen Gulf operations scheduled for early 1945 demanded the presence of all available tender strength at Ulithi in the Caroline Islands. Early in January Piedmont stood out of Manus Island for Ulithi with Service Squadron 10. January through April saw Piedmont in her most sustained effort. Those same months which witnessed the seaborne invasions of Lingayen, Iwo Jima, and Okinawa, found the repair department averaging more than 1,000 completed job orders and almost 100,000-man-hours of work each month.

==== Supporting the Fleet at Iwo Jima and Okinawa ====
During the long, bitter weeks of the Iwo-Okinawa operations, the United States fleet suffered more damage than at any other time in its history. USS Gansevoort (DD-608), beached and abandoned after being hit by a suicide plane during the Mindoro landings of November 1944, was patched, refloated, and towed to Ulithi for temporary repairs by Piedmont which would permit the vessel's return to the United States under its own power.

On 20 April USS McDermut (DD-677) made port with a 3-by-5-foot hole in its sheer strake, port side, for repair by Piedmont. USS Hale (DD-642), having suffered extensive damage to its port side bridge structure during a collision with a carrier while refueling, came alongside 1 May.

The most badly battered of the battle-damaged ships serviced by Piedmont at Ulithi was USS Hazelwood (DD-531) which came alongside 4 May. Its entire bridge superstructure was a mass of tangled wreckage, a bomb explosion had blown a 15-by-15-foot hole in her starboard side, main deck; its forward stack had been completely destroyed; extensive bomb damage extended down to its second platform, and her interior and fleet radio room had been destroyed. Numerous dead had still to be removed from the wreckage. All repairs effected were temporary and on 24 May Hazelwood sailed for the United States and a Navy yard rebuilding.

==== Post-Okinawa operations ====
With the cessation of all organized resistance on Okinawa in June Piedmont moved to the Naval Base at Leyte, Philippine Islands, for much-needed rest and repairs. However, its stay was short and on 30 June it sailed for Eniwetok again. At Eniwetok, the repair department was occupied chiefly with the construction and development of fleet recreation facilities ashore in anticipation of the fleet turn-around which had been scheduled for late August. The fleet did not return to Eniwetok for the anticipated August availability as on 14 August the Japanese government accepted Allied peace terms.

==== In Tokyo Bay at War's End ====
On top of this news, the ship received orders to prepare for getting underway. Piedmont had been selected from the Pacific Fleet destroyer tenders as the one to move into Tokyo Bay with the first naval units for the occupation of Japanese ships. On 16 August the ship departed Eniwetok to rendezvous with the U.S. 3rd Fleet at about one day's steaming from Japan. The long-awaited event took place on 28 August when Piedmont dropped anchor in Sagami Wan, Honshū, Japan. Early on the 30th, it moved into Tokyo Bay and on the following day moored to the dock at the Yokosuka Naval Base.

While moored at Yokosuka, Piedmont supplied provisions and clothing to the landing forces and to the hospital ships standing by to care for released allied prisoners of war. Piedmont remained in the Tokyo area supporting the occupation forces until sailing for the United States, arriving at Alameda, California, 15 March 1946.

Piedmont was moored off Tsingtao, China in the winter of 1946–1947, as part of Operation Beleaguer.

=== Korean War ===
When the Korean War's campaign began on 27 June 1950, Piedmont was on station in Japan carrying out its normal schedule providing tender services to ships of the U.S. 7th Fleet where it remained until relieved in November. During the Korean campaign Piedmont completed four tours in the Western Pacific: 4 September 1950 to 27 October 1950; 1 August 1951 to 12 February 1952; 9 September 1952 to 9 March 1953 and 11 April 1954 to 27 July 1954; when it acted as flagship for Commander United Nations Blockading and Escort Force and provided tender services to ships of Canada, Colombia, New Zealand, South Korea and Thailand as well as those of the U.S. Navy.

In February 1956 it returned from a six-month tour of duty in the Far East which included visits to the Philippines, Hong Kong, Formosa, and Japan. In January 1957 Piedmont again departed CONUS for his annual tour of duty in WestPac, visiting U.S. Naval Base Subic Bay, Hong Kong, Singapore, Sasebo, Kobe, and Yokosuka before returning again to San Diego, California, in August 1957.

On 23 June 1958 Piedmont departed San Diego and steamed for Yokosuka via Pearl Harbor, arriving there 12 July. When the Lebanon crisis in the Middle East erupted, Piedmont steamed 15 July for Subic Bay to stand ready and alerted to participate, if needed, in the Middle East action.

=== Quemoy and the Matsu Conflict ===
On 28 August 1958 Piedmont steamed to Kaohsiung, Taiwan, to tend 7th Fleet units engaged in convoy and patrol duty in the Taiwan Straits to prevent Communist capture of the off-shore island of Quemoy. After returning to Yokosuka via Hong Kong, Piedmont steamed for San Diego on 12 January 1959.

Between 1960 and 1962 Piedmont made two more cruises to WestPac. It received a Fleet Rehabilitation and Modernization overhaul at Long Beach, California, completed 31 January 1963.

It again deployed to WestPac from February to September 1963 and from June to December 1964.

On the morning of 1 November 1961, while on a five-day port call to Hong Kong, Piedmont collided with the ferry boat Lo Kee near North Point Ferry Pier in Victoria Harbour. The ferry, carrying 19 passengers and a crew of two to Ngau Tau Kok, capsized and sank. Piedmont and other nearby vessels quickly mounted a rescue operation, but two women passengers drowned and three others were seriously injured. Piedmont did not sustain damage.

=== Vietnam War ===
Three months of the latter tour were spent at Subic Bay servicing destroyers and other 7th Fleet ships serving in the Tonkin Gulf and off Vietnam.

During its 1963 tour it departed San diego on 26 Feb for Hawaii, then 4 months in Yokosuka, Hokg Kong from 18 to 24 July then back to Yokosuka, then Kobe, then departed for San Diego on 20 August from Yokosuka Japan.

During its 1968 WestPac tour Piedmont was still servicing ships in Subic Bay, as well as Kaohsiung, Taiwan.

In January 1969, Piedmont made a return trip to Southeast Asia in support of the Vietnam war. After a visit to Hawaii, it serviced Destroyers in Subic Bay and Kaohsiung, making a port call to Hong Kong.

Left for Westpac tour August 1970, for ship repairs of all kinds on ships of all kinds, a stop was made in Pearl Harbor to load weapons and then on to Subic Bay Naval Base in the Philippines for most of the 7 months. The return to stateside was a protracted trip including a week of R&R layover in Hong Kong anchored in the channel. Then on to another week in Yokosuka, Japan. The northern circle route was taken from Yokosuka, nearing the Aleutian Islands, and returning to the new homeport of Long Beach, CA in February 1971.

Received rework at dry docks of Hunters Point Naval Shipyard, San Francisco in the summer of 1971. Did 3 weeks of coastal maneuvers upon return to Long Beach.

Left for Westpac tour 1 April 1972, for ship repairs of all kinds on ships of all kinds. Ports visited were Subic Bay for most of the 9-month tour. Other ports visited were Hong Kong for R & R, Kaohsiung, Taiwan and Yokosuka, Japan and Da Nang, Vietnam and Pearl Harbor, Hawaii. Pearl was for loading weapons on way to Asia and offload of weapons on return to States. While in Da Nang harbor the Piedmont crew replaced 5" gun barrels on several destroyers. Returned to Long Beach in December 1972.

In August 1973 Piedmont left for its last Westpac before changing homeport to Naples. Ports visited were Pearl Harbor Hawaii, Yokosuka Japan, Okinawa, Kaohsiung Taiwan, Hong Kong, Subic Bay Philippines, and Sasebo Japan. Our stay in Kaohsiung was cut short by an approaching typhoon and the USS Piedmont left port to ride out the storm. After several days at sea, the USS Piedmont pulled into Sasebo. Most of the cruise was spent in Subic doing ship repair on other Westpac ships. The USS Piedmont was relieved by the Prairie in Yokosuka, Japan and upon leaving was ordered to replenish and refuel destroyers on station off the coast of Russia. After a 7-month cruise, the Piedmont arrived back in Long Beach in February 1974.

Upon returning to the States, Piedmont went to a dry dock in San Pedro, California for refurbishing in preparation to change home port to Naples from Long beach. Piedmont left in late fall/early winter for Naples via Panama Canal and Norfolk, Virginia.

Piedmont was present in Subic Bay Naval Base in the Summer of 1979.

=== End of U.S. service ===
After an extensive refit in San Pedro, California, Piedmont transferred to the Atlantic fleet and was homeported in Naples, Italy from December 1974 until June 1976. While in the Mediterranean, Piedmont provided services to the fleet and to the navies of Spain, France, Turkey, and Tunisia. Piedmont transferred to Norfolk, Virginia, in June 1976. Piedmont during the ship's stay in Naples made Port Visits to Turkey, and Spain. November 1975 Repair Crews were sent to the USS Belknap CG-26 for repairs after its collision with the USS John F. Kennedy CV-67.On Piedmonts return to the US, 1976 Piedmont made a Bi Centennial port visit to Portsmouth England. Piedmont was supposed to sail to the equator and then on to New York to participate in the First Operation Sail up the Hudson River. Those two cruises were canceled due to losing a main reduction gear leaving Piedmont to head home on one screw limping into Norfolk Virginia D&S Piers.

=== Turkish Navy ===
Piedmont was decommissioned on 30 September 1982 and leased to the Turkish navy on 18 October 1982 and renamed Derya (A-576). On 6 August 1987 Piedmont was stricken from the Naval Vessel Register and purchased outright by Turkey. On 17 August it was transferred to Turkey under the Security Assistance Program (SAP), Foreign Assistance Act (FAA) Section 516, Southern Region Amendment. It was deleted from the Turkish navy's register in 1994 and scrapped a year later.

=== In the movies ===
Piedmont is featured as the command ship of Admiral Halsey (portrayed by James Cagney) is the 1960 movie "The Gallant Hours".

== Awards and decorations ==
For service in World War II, Piedmont earned the Asiatic–Pacific Campaign Medal and the World War II Victory Medal.

Piedmont earned the Navy Occupation Service Medal, Pacific, for the periods from 2 September 1945 to 24 February 1946, from 11 June 1946 to 2 February 1947, and from 12 September 1948 to 15 September 1948. Piedmont also earned the China Service Medal for the periods from February to 30 March 1947, from 2 to 10 March 1948, and from 16 to 30 May 1950.

During the Korean War, it earned battle stars for: North Korean Aggression (25 September to 15 October 1950), Second Korean Winter (to 10 January 1952 and 6 to 7 February 1952), Korean Defense Summer-Fall 1952 (23 September to 3 October 1952 and 19 to 23 November 1952), and Third Korean Winter (28 to 30 December 1952 and 24 to 25 January 1953).

For the Vietnam War, Piedmont was awarded a star for: Vietnam Ceasefire (29 June to 8 July 1972). Prior to decommissioning in 1982 the Piedmont was awarded for Battle Efficiency "E", a notable award after such a long service career.
