= Piyale Pasha (disambiguation) =

Piyale Pasha (c. 1515-1578) was an Ottoman admiral

Piyale Paşa or Piyale Pasha may also refer to:

- Piyale Paşa, Güzelyurt, town in Northern Cyprus
- HMS Meteor (G73), renamed Piyale Paşa after sale to Turkish navy in 1959
- USS Fiske (DD-842), renamed Piyale Paşa after sale to Turkish navy in 1980
