= USS Davis (DD-937) =

United States Navy Cold War-era destroyer

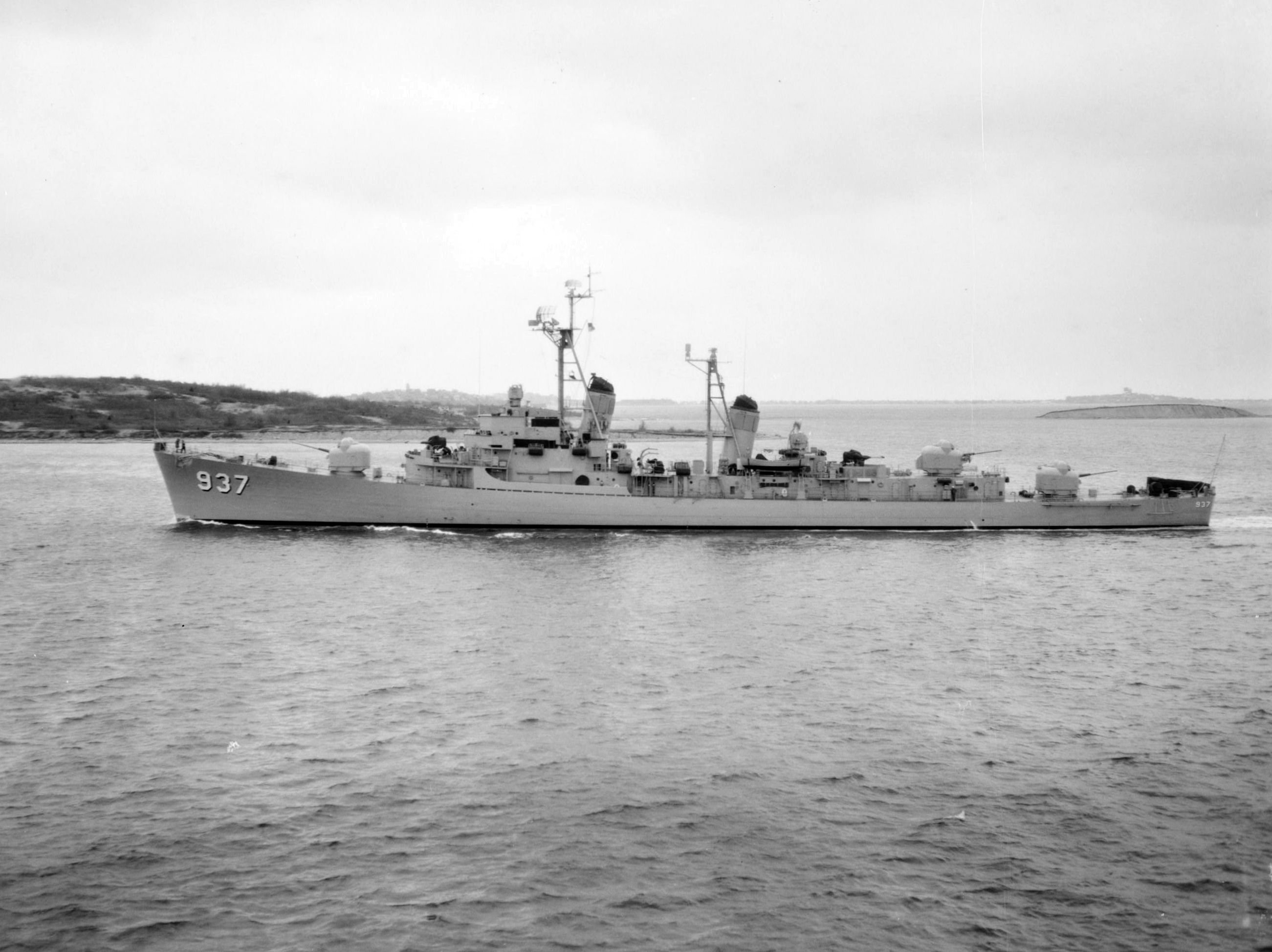
- USS Davis c. 1957

History

United States
- Namesake: George Fleming Davis
- Ordered: 3 February 1954
- Builder: Bethlehem Steel, Fore River Shipyard
- Laid down: 1 February 1955
- Launched: 28 March 1956
- Acquired: 28 February 1957
- Commissioned: 6 March 1957
- Decommissioned: 20 December 1982
- Stricken: 27 July 1990
- Motto: Vigilantia Pro Pacem
- Fate: Scrapped
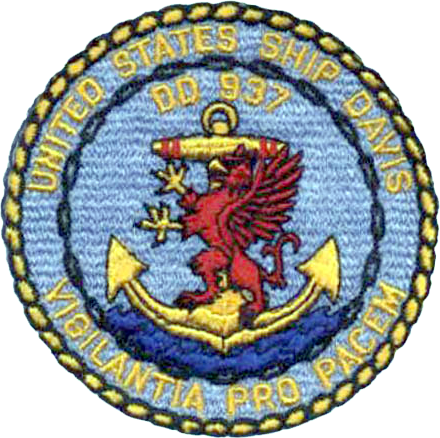
- Badge

General characteristics
- Class & type: Forrest Sherman-class destroyer
- Displacement: 4000 tons(full load)
- Length: 418 ft (127 m)
- Beam: 45 ft (14 m)
- Draft: 21 ft (6.4 m)
- Propulsion: Steam Turbine-70,000 h.p (52,2 MW) (4 - boilers burning DFM)
- Speed: 32 knots (59 km/h; 37 mph)
- Range: Excess of 2,000 n.m. (3,700 km)
- Complement: 18 Officers 290 Enlisted
- Armament: three 5"54 (127 mm/54) caliber Gun mounts; ASW Rockets, Homing Torpedoes

USS Davis (DD-937) was a Forrest Sherman-class destroyer of the United States Navy laid down by the Bethlehem Steel Corporation at Quincy, Massachusetts, on 1 February 1955. The ship was named for Commander George Fleming Davis USN (1911–1945), commanding officer of USS Walke (DD-723), killed in action at Lingayen Gulf on Luzon in the Philippine Islands on 6 January 1945, and posthumously awarded the Medal of Honor. Davis was launched on 28 March 1956 by Mrs. G. F. Davis, widow of Commander Davis, and commissioned on 6 March 1957 at Boston Naval Yard.

== Building and commissioning ==
The unnamed Forrest Sherman-class destroyer DD-937 was laid down on 1 February 1955 at Quincy, Massachusetts, by Bethlehem Steel Co. The ship was named Davis on 5 December 1955 and was launched on 28 March 1956 sponsored by Mrs. George F. Davis, widow of the late Commander George Fleming Davis. The ship departed her building yard on 28 February 1957 and arrived at Boston Naval Shipyard, where she was commissioned on 6 March 1957.

== Service history ==
After fitting out and undergoing preparations for sea, Davis departed the Boston Naval Shipyard on 23 April 1957 for trials off Brenton Reef, returning on 25 April. She sailed for Naval Station Newport, her assigned home port, on 2 May, arriving at her destination the same day. After undergoing an administrative inspection there on 10 May, she got underway for Cuban waters. She paused at the Washington Navy Yard from 17 to 20 May for Armed Forces Day celebrations, then embarked the Harbor and Rivers Commission for a cruise down the Potomac River. After stopping briefly at Naval Station Norfolk from 21 to 23 May, Davis pushed on for Guantanamo Bay, reaching her destination on 26 May. She conducted her shakedown cruise from those waters through mid-July, punctuating that training with visits to Kingston, Jamaica from 15 to 16 June and Ciudad Trujillo, Dominican Republic from 4 to 7 July.

Davis departed Guantanamo Bay on 15 July 1957 for a post-shakedown cruise to northern European waters, visiting Culebra (17 July) and San Juan, Puerto Rico from 17 to 19 July en route to the Azores. Pausing only briefly at Ponta Delgada (25 July), Davis then visited Rotterdam, Netherlands from 29 July to 2 August, Copenhagen, Denmark from 12 to 17 August and Edinburgh, Scotland from 19 to 22 August. She returned to Boston Naval Shipyard on 29 August for post-shakedown availability that kept her in yard hands (except a brief period at sea on 5–6 November) until 8 November, when she got underway to return to her home port Newport, arriving the following day. She became flagship for Captain Harry G. Moore, Commander, Destroyer Squadron (ComDesRon) 12, in November upon completion of that yard period.

Sailing for the Mediterranean and operations with the Sixth Fleet on 29 November 1957, Davis exercised and trained at sea until standing in to Cannes, France, on 16 December, where she remained through the Christmas and New Years' holidays. Sailing on 3 January 1958, the destroyer operated with the Sixth Fleet into the spring, punctuating her at-sea periods, during which time she participated in anti-submarine warfare (ASW) and air defense exercises and plane guarded a succession of attack carriers: Franklin D. Roosevelt, Saratoga, Essex and Randolph, and with visits to Pollensa Bay, Mallorca (5–7 January), Valetta, Malta (11–16 January), Piraeus, Greece (18–22 January), İskenderun (29–30 January) and İzmir (1–4 February), Turkey, and Rhodes, Greece (11–18 February), Genoa, Italy (22–28 February), Barcelona, Spain (10–17 March and 18–21 March). After pausing briefly at Gibraltar (1–3 April) as she left the Mediterranean, homeward-bound, Davis returned to Newport on 12 April.

Following post-deployment upkeep, the ship remained at her home port through early June 1958, logging a port call to New London, Connecticut, between 16 and 19 May. Davis then paused briefly at Boston (10–12 June) before she sailed for northern Europe on a midshipman cruise. During the course of that period of training, the destroyer visited Kiel, West Germany, for Kiel Week (25–30 June), Bergen, Norway (9–16 July) and Rotterdam (19–24 July). She ultimately returned to Boston on 4 August, disembarking midshipmen and beginning a period of post-deployment repairs and alterations that included the strengthening of her aluminum deckhouses and the installation of new expansion joints.

Emerging from the yard on 14 October 1958, Davis returned to her home port the following day, but remained there only a short time, sailing on 20 October to operate as part of Anti-Submarine Defense Forces, Atlantic, conducting advanced ASW training, until setting course to return to port on 3 November, standing in the following day. Sailing again on 1 December, she reached Norfolk the next day, and remained there, members of her crew given the opportunity to attend ASW Tactical School there, until her departure on 8 December for another stint of operations at sea. Heading for home on 15 December, she arrived on the 16th. She remained there into the first week of January 1959.

Davis sailed from Newport on 7 January 1959, then participated in Operation Springboard in the Caribbean operating areas, completing type training requirements and interspersing those evolutions with port visits to San Juan (11–12 January), Roosevelt Roads, Puerto Rico (13–14 January), Ciudad Trujillo (16–21 January), San Juan (23–26 January) and Saint Thomas, U.S. Virgin Islands (30 January – 2 February). Returning to her home port on 9 February, Davis remained there until 26 February, when she stood out en route to Washington, D.C., which she visited between 28 February and 5 March. Visits to Naval Station Mayport, Florida (8–10 March), Charleston, South Carolina (11–13 March) and Norfolk (14 March) followed; then, after unloading ammunition at the Naval Ammunition Depot, Earle, New Jersey, (15–16 March), the ship then entered the Boston Naval Shipyard on 17 March.

Following an extensive upkeep and overhaul period, Davis departed Boston on 17 June 1959, and paused at Newport (19–23 June) before steaming to Portsmouth, New Hampshire, where she took part in Independence Day observances during her stay (3–5 July). Proceeding thence to Guantanamo Bay for refresher training, Davis reached her destination on the morning of 11 July, but before the day was out, stood out to sea to patrol off the western and southern coasts of Haiti. Operating under Commander Caribbean Sea Frontier during her time off the island (12–16 July), Davis and her squadron-mates performed a deterrent mission, preventing neighboring nations from interfering in the internal affairs of Haiti during President Francois Duvalier's recovery from a heart attack. "The presence of the U.S. Navy bolstered the internal fortitude of Haiti," wrote one observer, "and was a major factor in maintaining peace in the Caribbean area." Davis visited Port au Prince, Haiti (1 August), returned to Cuban waters on 3 August, after which time she operated off Culebra, Puerto Rico, then conducted "special operations." Upon completion of that work, Davis stood out, bound for Newport, which she reached on 17 August, continuing her work to prepare for, and take part in, the annual competitive exercises. Subsequently, from 26 October 1959 the ship participated in Operation Tralex 4-59, evaluating "convoy procedures and amphibious assault operations," upon completion of which she returned to her home port on 7 November, for a tender overhaul before resuming operations with the Anti-Submarine Defense Force, Atlantic, beginning in December.

=== 1960s ===
Davis again headed southward, bound for the Caribbean, on 18 January 1960. After providing support for Operation Skyhook, an Office of Naval Research project, part of activities undertaken during the International Geophysical Year, "measuring...cosmic radiation at high altitude over the Caribbean area," the ship then spent the remainder of her one-month cruise engaged in extensive ASW operations. During that time, she and the other units of DesRon 12 received the nickname "Dragon Killers" in reference to one of their adversaries in the training evolutions being the new nuclear submarine USS Seadragon. A five-day visit to San Juan, Puerto Rico, capped the cruise in that region, and she ultimately returned to Newport on 18 February. After operating as part of an ASW Ready Group (7-21 March) in the North Atlantic, practicing "hunter-killer" operations, Davis completed her competitive exercises (March–April 1960) earning seven gunnery "E" awards for outstanding shooting. She spent May 1960 engaged in upkeep alongside a tender and spent June and July in extensive operations as part of the Second Fleet, participating in LantFlex 2-60. In mid-July, Davis received word that Commander, Destroyer Force, Atlantic Fleet, had designated her as the winner of the Battle Efficiency "E" for "outstanding performance in all areas of endeavor."

On 4 August 1960, DesRon 12 sailed for the Mediterranean, and upon joining the Sixth Fleet "were assigned to various Task Units. Subsequently, wrote one squadron chronicler, none of DesRon 12's ships operated together again in 1960, although Davis and USS Harlan R. Dickson proceeded into the Black Sea "on a special assignment," the third and fourth U.S. warships to enter that body of water since World War II. "Considerable publicity" ensued as the Soviet Union protested what it termed "provocative action." As the year 1960 ended, Davis had returned to the western Mediterranean.

Davis and DesRon 12 departed Pollensa Bay and the Sixth Fleet for Rota, Spain, and thence, to the continental United States on 13 February 1961, and reached their home port eleven days later to begin leave periods and pre-yard tender availabilities. Davis departed Newport on 4 April for Boston Naval Shipyard, where she received a scheduled overhaul to machinery and equipment. Upon completion of that period of yard work on 5 July, Davis took ammunition on board, then visited New York City; returning to her home port to prepare for refresher training. She operated daily off Newport, getting ready for the slated work in Cuban waters. She sailed on 24 July for Guantanamo Bay, arriving on 28 July whence she conducted "long and difficult, yet extremely valuable, training...liberally spiced with patrols and exercises, in view of the existing Cuban situation..." that included taking part in an exercise (25 August) that featured a "simulated Atomic underwater burst..." Davis sailed for Key West, Florida, on 8 September, there to provide services for the Fleet Sonar School.

Standing out from Key West on 14 September 1961, Davis paid a visit to Norfolk en route back to her home port. Hurricane Esther, however, compelled a change in plans. When the storm forced the evacuation of the crew from Texas Tower 3, Davis received orders to guard the facility. Ultimately, the abatement of the hurricane-force winds permitted the ship to return to Newport on 22 September. During October 1961, the destroyer then took part in a two-week training evolution as part of Task Force 22, of the Second Fleet, off the Virginia capes. During November, Davis and Compton deployed twice with TF-140, supporting the recovery operations of Enos, the chimpanzee from the Mercury-Atlas 5 space mission. During the first deployment, on 14 November, Davis transferred her hospital corpsman to the Swedish oil tanker Seven Skies to aid an injured crewman. She returned to Newport on 1 December 1961 for upkeep that included a tender availability, and remained in her home port through the beginning of the new year.

On 7 February 1962, Davis departed for the Mediterranean in company with Harlan R. Dickson, Gainard, Hyman, Beatty and Purdy; Compton, delayed by last-minute repairs at Newport, caught up with them at Gibraltar. Becoming a part of the Sixth Fleet on 17 February, DesRon 12 relieved DesRon 22 two days later, its ships, including the squadron flagship, Davis, deployed among various task forces as before.

During her time in the Sixth Fleet, the ship continued the type of work performed in the past, exercises punctuated by port calls. In July, she received word that she had won gunnery and supply department “E”s for 1962, as well as her third consecutive Battle Efficiency “E.” During that deployment, Davis and her squadron mates "participated in Operation Full Swing, MidLandEx and RegEx 62...commended at varying times for signal bridge work to their fine shooting, from smart seamanship to the spreading of good will ashore. Operations at sea consisted primarily of plane guarding and [ASW] exercises..."

DesRon 12 reassembled at Gibraltar on 19 August 1962 and sailed for home, reaching their home port on 30 August. Davis entered a leave and upkeep period, followed by a two-week tender availability and a restricted yard availability at the Boston Naval Shipyard. Tensions with the Soviet Union over their deployment of missiles to Cuba, and the consequent establishment of a quarantine of Cuba, however, cut that period of repairs and alterations from six weeks to five. “All ships worked overtime,” wrote DesRon 12's chronicler, "and got to sea in time to participate in the Cuban Contingency Operation." On 12 November, Davis sailed for her station on the quarantine line. While thus deployed, she visited Santo Domingo as part of the American effort to "demonstrate...support for forthcoming free elections in that country." During her two-day visit to the capital of the Dominican Republic, the ship hosted President Raphael Bonnelly and gave a party for the children at a local orphanage.

Returning to Newport on 29 November 1962, Davis put to sea as part of the holiday ready-duty ASW task group, steaming to Bermuda and operating with antisubmarine warfare support carrier USS Wasp over Christmas. Returning to her home port on 29 December, the ship remained there into the following year, in a leave and upkeep status.

On 21 January 1963, Davis, and all (except Purdy) of DesRon 12, sailed from Newport for Norfolk, where, along with other units of Task Group Bravo, they attended ASW Tactical School. After conducting ASW evolutions (28 January – 9 February), followed by an upkeep period at Newport, Davis operated with Task Group Bravo as it covered the visit of President John F. Kennedy to Costa Rica in March, remaining with Wasp and in company with Compton and Gainard. Following that assignment, the ship conducted the annual Springboard operations, interspersed with visits to St. Thomas, San Juan and Santo Domingo, ultimately returning to Newport on 3 April.

Following a tender availability, Davis got underway on 19 April 1963 for Norfolk for work at the ASW Tactical School, honing her skills for future coordinated ASW operations, for a five-day period that concluded with her return to Newport on 2 May. Soon thereafter, she sailed on 11 May, along with her squadron-mates, "deployed as standby recovery stations" for the Mercury-Atlas 9 space flight of Gordon Cooper. Upon the successful conclusion of that mission, Davis returned to Newport.

Subsequently, Davis sailed on 4 June 1963 with 26 Naval Reserve Officers Training Corps midshipmen on board, as Task Group Bravo began a six-week cruise, beginning with visiting a succession of Gulf Coast ports, Galveston and Houston, Texas, Mobile, Alabama, Gulfport, Mississippi, Port Arthur, Texas and New Orleans, Louisiana, proceeding thence to La Ceiba and Puerto Cortés, Honduras, Santo Domingo, Curaçao, Montego Bay and Kingston, Jamaica, San Juan and Ponce, Puerto Rico.

Davis spent much of August and September 1963 moored at Newport, with the exception of a weapons demonstration for students at the Naval War College (12–16 August), highlighted by a surface-to-air missile shoot by the nuclear-powered guided missile USS Bainbridge. Following that period, Davis and the rest of DesRon 12 got underway for Norfolk on 23 September for a week of evolutions with the ASW Tactical School, followed by ASW operations at sea on 30 September. She carried out further ASW work with her squadron-mates and a target submarine, ultimately returning to Newport on 11 October.

Following participation in a "combined demonstration" for students of the National War College (28 October – 1 November 1963), the ship continued her work as part of Task Group Bravo, first with Wasp and then with sistership Lake Champlain, work punctuated by a three-day visit to Bermuda in mid-November.

Operating from Newport, Davis began the year 1964 with four weeks of ASW exercises with the ships of her squadron, during January and February. Following her regular overhaul (for which she had departed her home port on 27 March) at Boston Naval Shipyard, she carried out refresher training at Guantanamo, along with Hyman and Purdy. Effective 1 July, DesRon 12 became part of Cruiser-Destroyer Flotilla (CruDesFlot) 10. Davis operated with the Second Fleet Gold Group in October, and the following month received an annual administrative inspection by Captain Burdick H. Brittin, ComDesRon 12, and his staff. On 27 November, Davis and her consorts sailed for the Mediterranean, and arrived at Gibraltar to join the Sixth Fleet on 8 November. The squadron then visited a succession of ports: Palma de Mallorca, Pollensa Bay, Valencia and Alicante in Spain; Toulon, Cannes and Golfe-Juan in France; and Naples and Livorno in Italy.

Returning from the Mediterranean on 14 March 1965, Davis remained in her home port only a relatively short time, for she soon returned to the Caribbean area due to the Dominican Civil War. Davis, ComDesRon 12 embarked, departed Newport on 10 June in company with Stickell. After fueling from oiler Sabine on 13 June, she rendezvoused with Myles C. Fox and soon thereafter began patrolling off the coast of Santo Domingo. Steaming independently, she fueled from Sabine again on 19 June, resuming her patrol upon completion of the underway replenishment. On 26 June, ComDesRon 12 assumed duties as CTF-124. Davis fueled from Aucilla on 30 June, then resumed patrol, sighting Dominican patrol craft on 1 July. She refueled from Aucilla a second time, on 6 July, then patrolled in area P-3 on 9 July. ComDesRon 12 shifted his flag to USS Bordelon on 10 July, then a little less than three hours later Davis departed for San Juan, standing in the next morning. On 15 July, she proceeded to the gunfire range at Culebra to conduct Naval gunfire support practice. Davis fueled from Essex en route back to Newport on 19 July, then conducted ASW exercises with TG 83.3 on 20 July, and then participated in gunnery exercises. She fueled from Neosho on 21 July; maneuvered again with Essex and ultimately arrived back at Newport, mooring on 22 July.

Davis departed Newport on 3 January 1966 and reached the Naval Ammunition Depot, Earle, the following day. After taking on a full load of ammunition, she returned to her home port "and continued the myriad preparations for the scheduled deployment to the western Pacific." A little over a fortnight later, on 19 January, Davis sailed for Panama on the first leg of her journey, carrying out drills en route. Transiting the Panama Canal on 25 January, she reached San Diego, California, on 4 February for "limited boiler repair" before continuing on her voyage. Underway the following day, she pushed on for Hawaii. Following a brief stop at Naval Base Pearl Harbor, Davis, along with Destroyer Division (DesDiv) 121, reached Naval Base Subic Bay, Philippines, on 28 February (DesDiv 122 proceeded to Kaohsiung, Taiwan).

==== Vietnam War (first deployment) ====
On 4 March 1966, Davis sailed from Subic Bay. Following operations with the attack carrier USS Ticonderoga (4–8 March), she proceeded to the waters of IV Corps, the southern-most military region in South Vietnam to provide gunfire support for South Vietnamese forces and their American advisors (8–14 March). Following that period, she returned to the attack aircraft carrier strike group and alternated between serving as a unit of the protective screen or as plane guard. Davis accompanied the attack carriers Ticonderoga (15–31 March) and Hancock (1–10 April) as they launched daily air strikes against targets in both North and South Vietnam. "The carrier operations were demanding on destroyers," her chronicler continued, "with launches and recoveries being conducted around the clock." Entertainers Danny Kaye and Vikki Karr visited the ship, via a Kaman SH-2 Seasprite helicopter, to entertain the crew with comedy and music, during that period.

Davis sailed for Sasebo, Japan, on 10 April 1966, mooring in port three days later alongside the repair ship Ajax. Following a fortnight in that city, Davis returned to Subic Bay for a brief tender availability alongside Markab. Commander, Cruiser-Destroyer Force, Pacific Fleet, paid the ship an informal visit to present the ship with the Arleigh Burke Fleet Trophy for 1965, awarded "for achieving the greatest improvement in battle efficiency during the competitive year" to one ship in the Atlantic and one in the Pacific. Ironically, the high speed transport USS Cook, the winner of the trophy in the Pacific Fleet, lay moored nearby. Each commanding officer visited the other ship and exchanged plaques.

Davis sailed for Hong Kong, arriving on the afternoon of 7 May 1966. Underway once more on 11 May, the destroyer sailed for the coast of South Vietnam and her second gunfire support tour, that time off the shores of I Corps, the northernmost military region. Operating off Quảng Ngãi province, Davis fired missions against the Viet Cong (VC), supporting the Army of the Republic of Vietnam (ARVN)'s 2nd Division and United States Army Second Advisory Group, providing gunfire support almost daily, and on numerous occasions during the night to assist ARVN troops and their advisors in preventing outposts from being over-run by the Viet Cong. "With such effective support," Davis's historian noted, "the 2nd ARVN [Division] outposts were able to maintain their positions along the coastal plain of Quảng Ngãi and to keep [the strategically important] Highway One open." For over a month, the ship also provided gunfire support for United States Marine Corps (USMC) units in the vicinity of Chu Lai and Da Nang.

Illustrative of the nature of the routine Davis often followed, on 24 May 1966 she fired 13 rounds of gunfire support during the afternoon watch, then stationed the special sea and refueling detail at 21:58 as she began maneuvering to go alongside the underway replenishment ship Sacramento. She received 46,281 gallons of Navy Standard Fuel Oil (NSFO) between 22:23 and 23:12, then took her first load of powder on board as 23:40 and completed the re-ammunitioning (234 rounds of flashless powder) a half hour into the mid watch on 25 May, after which she broke away from the Sacramento. She then fired 20 rounds of gunfire support during the forenoon watch before commencing a vertical replenishment (vertrep) from Sacramento between 12:54 and 13:38, taking on board 228 rounds of 5”/54 anti-aircraft common projectiles. A little over two hours later, she began firing a gunfire support mission consisting of two rounds, but fired a second during the first watch, commencing at 21:00, firing an illumination round every fifteen minutes for the remainder of the watch. Continuing her operations in the "hostile fire pay zone" on 26 May, she fired a gunfire support mission during the forenoon watch, firing 135 rounds of 5-inch and 42 rounds of 3-inch. She conducted a second mission that day that proved essentially a duplicate of the one the night before; beginning at 21:00, she fired one illumination round every fifteen minutes.

Davis departed the war zone on 10 June 1966 for Kaohsiung and moored alongside destroyer tender Dixie for "repairs necessitated by the long period of operations under combat conditions." The ship sailed on 20 June to return to the waters off I Corps. She continued to respond to calls for gunfire support in a timely manner, and also "found time to respond to an emergency request for blood" from the hospital ship Repose. By the time Davis left the firing line, she had expended over 5,000 rounds of 5”/54 and over 1,000 of 3”/50. The ship received a message from the I Corps Naval Gunfire Liaison Officer: "It's been a real pleasure working with you and I can say that Davis is the best damned shooting tin can in Uncle Sam's Navy and the best one we've worked with in our time here. You're a real credit to the Navy."

Following a third upkeep period at Subic (3–6 July 1966) where DesRon 12 reassembled after their individual deployments parceled out with the Seventh Fleet, Davis and her consorts sailed for the U.S. on 6 July. They crossed the equator on 9 July. Davis and the ships of DesDiv 121 fueled at Penang, Malaysia (11–12 July) (DesDiv 122 fueled at Port Dickson), the squadron reassembling again on 12 July. They visited Cochin, India (16–18 July), then pushed on for the British Protectorate of Aden, where they fueled "under the watchful eye of a Russian trawler." Given the Aden Emergency however, the officers and men of DesRon 12 experienced no liberty there.

Davis and her squadron mates continued their voyage, "proceeding individually up the Red Sea" to the southern end of the Suez Canal, then transited that waterway (27 July 1966) on the way to Greece. After visiting Pireaus (29 July – 1 August), DesRon 12 split up again, with Davis and DesDiv 121 visiting Barcelona (4–7 August), DesDiv 122 calling at Palma de Mallorca. Both divisions got underway on 7 August, paused at Gibraltar for fuel (9 August), then began their crossing of the Atlantic, enjoying a smooth voyage and a "grand" homecoming to Newport on 17 August as “fireboats sprayed streams of water, a light plane towed a welcome home sign, and hundreds of wives and children filled the pier.” Word of the ship's being awarded the Battle Efficiency “E” in DesRon 12 crowned Davis’s successful circumnavigation of the globe.

Davis sailed from her home port on 22 September 1966 for Boston Naval Shipyard, arriving there the following day for "extensive work on her engineering plant," after which she returned to DesRon 12 for active operations on 26 November. She rounded out the year participating in LantFlEx 66 (28 November – 16 December), then finished the year in holiday leave and upkeep status that lasted into the following year.

Following a period alongside the destroyer tender Grand Canyon, Davis got underway for a stint of ASW operations on 23 January 1967, upon completion of which she returned to her home port (29 January). Underway again on 13 February, the ship participated in Springboard evolutions that included ASW, antiaircraft and surface gunnery exercises, punctuated by visits to San Juan. Davis carried out surveillance of a Soviet intelligence-gathering trawler on 4 March, then proceeded on to Miami, Florida, arriving there for a brief visit (9–12 March). Returning to Newport on 15 March, she remained in port until her departure for the Mediterranean on 2 May, with the exception of local operations (20–21 March) and a dependents' cruise (24 April).

==== Six-Day War and USS Liberty incident ====
Davis stood out of the waters off Newport on 2 May 1967, bound for the Mediterranean. She arrived at Gibraltar on 11 May, then sailed two days later to begin operations with TG 60.2 of the Sixth Fleet. Ominously, "about [that] time tension in the Arab-Israeli area became critical," one observer wrote, "and DesRon 12, along with the other units in the Sixth Fleet went on increased alert status and remained at sea..." The Sixth Fleet received orders to move into the eastern Mediterranean on 23 May, four days after the United Arab Republic (UAR) had ordered the United Nations Emergency Force (UNEF) to withdraw from the Sinai Peninsula. Three days later, as Egypt remilitarized the Sinai and declared a blockade of the Gulf of Aqaba off the Israeli port of Eilat, U.S. dependents de-planed in Athens and Rome, having been flown in from Cairo, UAR and Israel, respectively. An increased Soviet naval presence appeared soon thereafter, as the first Soviet warships transited the Dardanelles from the Black Sea and began more aggressive shadowing of U.S. naval movements. On 5 June, in the wake of those increasing tensions, the Six-Day War opened with a dramatic pre-emptive attack by Israel on Egypt and spread to include Jordan and Syria over the next few days.

Rendezvousing with TG 60.1 at 14:32 on 8 June 1967, Davis assumed her place in the screen of the attack carriers America and Saratoga, along with guided missile light cruisers Little Rock and Galveston. At 17:19, however, Davis and Massey received verbal orders to proceed at once to the assistance of the technical research ship Liberty, that had, earlier that day, been attacked in international waters by Israeli jets and motor torpedo boats, approximately 15 miles (24 km) north of the Sinai port of Arish, UAR. Davis conducted a brief helicopter transfer "of two people and equipment from USS America" between 18:06 and 18:08 and increased speed.

While Liberty steamed slowly away from the coastline, Davis (Capt. Harold G. Leahy, ComDesRon 12, embarked) and Massey raced to her aid. Davis worked up to 30 knots during the first watch on 8 June and maintained that speed during the mid-watch on 9 June 1967. The two destroyers reached the limping Liberty during the morning watch on 9 June, finding her listing to starboard, while the plethora of shell and fragment holes topside, the burned and scarred paintwork and the gaping torpedo hole in her hull bore mute testimony to the unbridled ferocity of the attack of the day before.

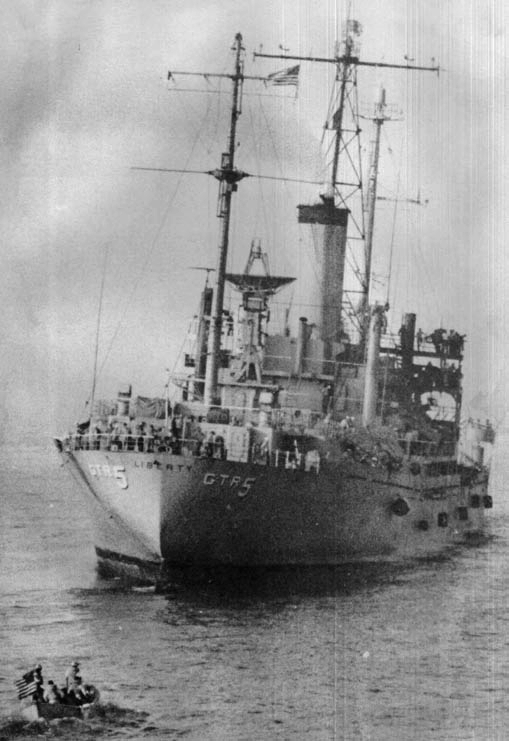
Davis whaleboat approaches USS Liberty, 9 June 1967

Davis rang down "all stop" at 06:32 on 9 June 1967 and lay-to, launching her motor Whaleboat; the boat then made runs between Davis and Liberty, transferring medical and damage control parties. Massey contributed a corpsman to help treat the wounded. Davis moored alongside Liberty between 07:25 and 09:42 to continue the process, transferred men then cleared the side while helicopters evacuated the seriously wounded, and the bodies of the slain, to America, which, along with Little Rock, arrived shortly thereafter. The cruiser transferred her damage control assistant, in addition to two corpsmen, to Liberty, and took on board some of the less seriously wounded men. Later, after Davis had transferred two photographers to the ship by helicopter at 14:02, Davis's main propulsion assistant, was transferred to the Liberty by helicopter at 16:06.

Davis's 20-man team played important roles in righting the ship, aided by the unwounded or less seriously injured Liberty crewmen, raising steam and getting the badly damaged vessel underway for Malta, accompanied by the fleet tug USS Papago, whose presence freed Massey to return to the fleet. During the passage to Valetta, Daviss and Libertys sailors gradually restored "most of the ship's vital systems, including the main gyro, sound-powered phone circuits, and a main fire and flushing pump." Ultimately, Liberty, convoyed by Davis and Papago, stood in to Valetta harbor during the morning watch on 14 June 1967. Seventeen Davis crewmen received commendations for their work in aiding the Liberty.

Davis departed Malta on 19 June 1967 to conduct ASW operations, then stood in to Souda Bay, Crete, on 23 June for a brief period of upkeep alongside destroyer tender Tidewater. While at Souda Bay, she embarked several midshipmen for summer training. Putting in to Civitavecchia, Italy, on 7 July, she returned to sea ten days later to continue her routine of drills and operations. Then, following visits to Porto Contini, Sardinia, Golfe-Juan, France and Ibiza, Spain, interludes interspersed with operations at sea, Davis picked up a sonar contact on 24 August and evaluated it as a Soviet submarine. Destroyer Fred T. Berry joined Davis in prosecuting the contact, that attempted, unsuccessfully, to evade the Americans. The submarine crept eastward at speeds varying from one to three knots. Destroyers Massey and Basilone and escort ships Brumby and Lester, joined to assist, while the anti-submarine controllers on board Davis and Fred T. Berry conducted over 1,200 Magnetic Anomaly Detection verification runs on the submarine, utilizing aircraft from Essex. "Finally," wrote Fred T. Berrys historian, "after 105 hours of being bombarded by the sonars of [Fred T.] Berry and Davis, a Soviet Foxtrot-class submarine (F.966) "surfaced to the delight of the entire Sixth Fleet" (30 August). After calling at Palma de Mallorca (30 August – 5 September 1967), Davis got underway for the last ASW operations in the deployment to the Mediterranean on 5 September, upon completion of which she put in to Rota for turnover procedures, on 10 September. Two days later, she sailed for home, and reached Newport on 21 September.

Following a period of local operations out of her home port, Davis dropped down the coast to Norfolk, where she "received personnel from school" (22 October 1967), conducted further work at sea, then returned to Norfolk, where she remained until 1 November. Returning to Newport, the ship prepared for her next stint of operations at sea, and during that time served as the venue (3 November) for the ceremony in which Captain Leahy received the Navy Commendation Medal for his leadership in the evolutions that led to the 105-hour hold-down, and consequent surfacing, of the Soviet Foxtrot class submarine in August 1967. Davis then operated with the Royal Canadian Navy in a joint ASW exercise, Operation CanUS SilEx, from 6 November, then visited Halifax, Nova Scotia (17–20 November). Returning to Newport on 22 November, Davis prepared for a yard period at Boston to receive an interim overhaul of boiler superheaters, economizers, and other portions of the engineering plant.

Ready for sea by early February 1968, Davis underwent dock trials on 6 February, then got underway on 8 February. Transiting the Cape Cod Canal on 10 February, the ship paused only briefly at her home port, for she sailed on 13 February, headed for the Caribbean in company with Massey and Stickell to participate in Operation Springboard. A slate of ASW and AAW exercises, shore bombardment drills off Culebra and a "tough and exacting Operational Readiness Inspection" then followed, punctuated by four visits to San Juan and one to St. Thomas for recreation. Upon completion of Springboard evolutions, Davis returned to Mayport on 8 March 1968 for a three-week stay. Underway again on 30 March, the ship then departed for a stint of "special operations." Classified briefings at Key West followed, on 2 April, describing her duties.

Over the next three weeks, punctuated only by three one-day visits to Key West, Davis, as Commander TG 138.2, provided support for USNS Sgt. Joseph E. Muller as she operated in the Florida Straits. Davis operated at round-the-clock Condition III watches, the destroyer on occasion scrutinized by Soviet-built Komar-class missile boats out of Havana, as she essentially rode shotgun for Sgt. Joseph E. Muller as the auxiliary vessel carried out her "research." Relieved on 22 April, the destroyer returned to Newport for a brief visit (25–29 April).

Together with Stickell and the escort ship Dealey, Davis participated in ASW exercises as part of TG 83.1, formed around Wasp. Liberty at Bermuda punctuated the "hectic" training and the "long hours," after which another week of ASW evolutions ensued. She returned to her home port on 22 May 1968.

Soon thereafter, on 1 July 1968, Davis was reassigned from DesRon 12 to DesRon 20, again designated as flagship. That same month, she conducted short cruises off the Virginia capes, carrying out a busy slate of AAW, ASW, and surface gunnery work, in addition to basic seamanship. Sailing on 22 August in company with Hugh Purvis, Davis put in to Norfolk on 23 August, and there embarked Captain Robert E. Williams, ComDesRon 36, as the ship was assigned temporarily to DesRon 36 for the impending WestPac deployment. She sailed for Panama the same day.

Transiting the Panama Canal on 28 August 1968, Davis got underway for Long Beach Naval Shipyard on 1 September. Remaining there for five days (5–10 September), the ship paused at Pearl Harbor (15–18 September), Midway Atoll (21 September) and Guam (28 September). After transiting San Bernardino Strait, Davis arrived at Subic Bay on 2 October for a final period of shipyard work before she would report to the war zone. Underway on 8 October, Davis arrived on station two days later.

==== Vietnam War second deployment ====
During her first gunline tour of that deployment, Davis, ComDesRon 36 and his staff receiving gunfire support briefings at Da Mang and Dong Ha Combat Base on 10 October 1968, operated off the northern coast of South Vietnam, just below the Vietnamese Demilitarized Zone (DMZ). She supported the 1st Air Cavalry Division from 10 to 14 October, and the 3rd Marine Division from 14 to 29 October. During the second stint, Davis, with ComDesRon 36 as Gunline Commander, Commander, Task Unit (CTU) 70.8.9, began softening up the territory south of Ben Hao, along the DMZ, for a joint 3rd Marine Division-ARVN operation. Davis took some 70 targets under fire, including 24 "active artillery sites," killing 112 enemy troops and destroying over 30 bunkers and structures; 3rd Marine Division observers considered the operations on 23–24 October successful, "due primarily to the excellent preparation and call for fire by naval guns prior to and during the sweeps."

Such operations, however, proved not at all one-sided as the shoot-out at high noon on 26 October 1968 proved. People's Army of Vietnam guns opened up from Hòn Gió island (Tiger island), while Davis stood off the DMZ awaiting a gunfire support assignment, pumping out 25–30 rounds in ten minutes, bracketing the ship with the first two rounds and putting the third one close astern, spraying fragments on the destroyer's stern but hurting no one. Daviss guns spoke in reply, and some 160 rounds silenced the PAVN battery. On the night of 28–29 October, three more "enemy-initiated incidents" resulted in some 22 rounds of "hostile fire" being fired in Daviss direction, all from the vicinity of Cape Lay, with the destroyer responding in kind each time. She received hostile fire again on 1 November, as she continued support of the 3rd Marine Division, but emerged unscathed from the encounter once more, and provided call fire for the Marines between 8–13 November, before she departed the gunline for Sasebo, Japan, on 16 November, ending her first line deployment.

After visiting Sasebo (22 November – 1 December 1968), Davis visited Busan, South Korea (2–5 December) and Hong Kong (8–14 December) before she returned to the gun line on 16 December, reporting "on station and ready to fire" in the waters off I Corps. The next day, she began gunfire support for the 1st Marine Division, and on the 18th fired in support of Operation Victory Dragon VI; she continued support of the 1st Marine Division until 21 December, then shifted back to Victory Dragon VI (21–24 December). Firing no missions on Christmas Day, she resumed the next day, firing once more in support of Victory Dragon VI; she rounded out the month (27–31 December) in support of Operation Valiant Hunt, an amphibious landing south of Danang.

At the beginning of January 1969, Daviss principal missions during the concluding portion of Valiant Hunt (1–5 January 1969) involved harassment, suppressing sniper fire, causing one secondary explosion and destroying three enemy outposts, it had also evidently inflicted heavy casualties, as the Marines discovered mass graves in the area. When questioned, the local populace attributed the 20–30 dead VC buried en masse to the ship's harassing fire.

With Captain Murphy's relief as CTU 70.8.1 by ComDesRon 5 on 6 January 1969 upon the conclusion of Valiant Hunt, Davis conducted a succession of rest and recreation visits, to Kaohsiung; Cebu, Philippines; and Subic Bay. The destroyer departed the latter place on 26 January to return to the gun line. During the last three days of January, Davis provided gunfire support for the 27th Marine Regiment and the Republic of Korea (ROK) 2nd Marine Brigade in Quảng Nam province, "the destroyer's 5"/54 projectiles [accounting] for four enemy KIA, five more probably killed, 28 structures or bunkers destroyed, 18 damaged, two secondary explosions and three secondary fires." Davis continued her gunfire support duties until 15 February, after which time she returned to Subic (16 February) to prepare for the voyage back to the United States.

On 18 February 1969, DesRon 36 sailed for home, Davis, accompanied by DuPont, Power and Hugh Purvis. The squadron visited Sydney, Australia (1–3 March), Wellington, New Zealand (8–10 March), Pago Pago, American Samoa (16 March) and Pearl Harbor, where ComDesRon 36 shifted his broad pennant from Davis to DuPont on 22 March. Transiting the Panama Canal on 6 April, Davis reached Newport soon thereafter. Over the next five months, the ship operated between Newport and the Caribbean, participating in exercises, and "special operations" in the latter region. She departed her home port on 17 October and entered Boston Naval Shipyard soon thereafter, where she was decommissioned during the forenoon watch on 30 October 1969.

=== 1970s ===
Recommissioned at her conversion yard on 17 October 1970 and with Commander Davis's widow and son in attendance at the invitation of the crew, Davis remained at Boston, completing her fitting-out, then conducted her Board of Inspection and Survey (InSurv) trials in the Boston Operating Areas on 26 October, putting back into the yard the following day. Moved to the South Boston Naval Shipyard Annex, cold-iron, on 2 December, she shifted to the operational control of Commander, Cruiser-Destroyer Force, U.S. Atlantic Fleet, as a unit of Cruiser-Destroyer Flotilla 10 and DesRon 12 two days later.

Rejoining the fleet, Davis conducted tests of her sensors and weapons systems on the Fleet Operational Readiness Accuracy Checks (FORACS) range off Cape Cod (7–8 December 1970) then proceeded, via the Cape Cod Canal and Buzzards Bay, to Earle, to load ammunition (9 December). During the two-day evolution, however, the ship's inspectors rejected over 200 projectiles ("improper gas check seals"), a rejection that would, in time, lead to the Bureau of Ordnance's re-evaluating its inspection procedures and providing better ammunition service to the Fleet. She then returned to her home port, after an absence of more than a year, on 11 December.

Shifted from DesRon 12 to DesRon 20 on New Year's Day 1971. Davis sailed for Guantanamo on 12 January 1971, then conducted various training evolutions off the Virginia capes, including a surface gunnery shoot with fleet tug Papago towing the target. After taking on supplies, fuel, and stores at Norfolk Naval Base (19–21 January), the ship got underway for Port Everglades, where she conducted "pre-weapon system accuracy test alignment and calibration checks. From Port Everglades, Davis proceeded to the Tongue of the Ocean, off Andros, Bahamas, where she underwent "acoustic sensor and ASW weapons system testing on the AUTEC range (27–30 January), firing her first ASROC test missile on 29 January as well as several tube-launched weapons. A "minor engineering casualty" and the ensuing wait for parts to enable her to make the necessary repairs at Port Everglades (31 January – 2 February) delayed the ship's proceeding to Guantanamo Bay.

Arriving at her destination on 6 February 1971, Davis began her post-overhaul shakedown five days later, conducting drills that range from low visibility piloting, general quarters, air tracking and submarine tracking with Tirante. Less than a week after embarking upon her shakedown, Davis received orders to conduct surveillance off the Cuban port of Cienfuegos. After she took on fuel on the evening of 16 February, she sailed under orders of Commander, ASW Forces, Atlantic (ComASWForLant) and arrived off her destination, effecting a rendezvous with destroyer Charles P. Cecil and radar picket escort ship Calcaterra the following evening, the three ships setting up a "barrier patrol...to observe all shipping." During Davis's watch, no ships entered or exited the harbor without being positively identified. Destroyer Mullinnix relieved her on 19 February.

Following further shakedown training, Davis visited Ocho Rios, Jamaica (5–7 March 1971), successfully conducted a mid-term battle problem (11 March), then operated as assist ship for Koelsch as the escort ship carried out a test of "convergent zone techniques," using her AN/SQS-26 sonar, working with submarine Amberjack (18–19 March) as her target, before resuming her shakedown. Only moments after getting underway for the day's evolutions on 26 March, however, Davis received orders to return to the pier and refuel. Returning to Cienfuegos for a second surveillance operation under ComASWForLant, the destroyer took up a station to seaward of Calcaterra and resumed a patrol off the entrance to the harbor, identifying shipping standing in or out of Cienfuegos as before. On 31 March, she returned to Guantanamo.

Setting the sea and anchor detail and sailing for Newport on 7 April 1971, Davis returned to her home port on 10 April. Fueling on 5 May, the ship stood out for European waters two days later, stopping at Bermuda (9–10 May). Steaming thence to Ponta Delgada, Azores (14 May), Davis steamed to Terceria, Azores, making the first visit by an American warship in 25 years," and hosted the Naval Commander, Azores, and the U.S. Consul, the ship's visit highlighting Armed Forces Day observances. At the start of the mid watch, Davis sailed for the Netherlands.

After passage through the English Channel, Davis reached Amsterdam (19–24 May 1971), then visited Hamburg, West Germany (25–28 May) and Copenhagen, Denmark, where she arrived on 29 May. Departing that Danish port four days later, she received a message "implying that the trip home might not follow the same route as the journey to Northern Europe..." As had occurred earlier in the year off Cuba, Davis received the call to embark upon "special operations." Her mission, to "locate, photograph and gain all possible visual, acoustical and electronic intelligence" on a new Soviet guided missile destroyer (known only as DDGM 500) steaming in company with the oiler Boris Chiliken. Armed with only sketchy information at the outset, Davis utilized some "educated guesswork and... alert ESM operators" to pick up the Soviet ships late at night on 3 June 1971. "Dawn [of 4 June] confirmed the identity of the two vessels" and the destroyer became their shadow as they transited the English Channel.

Breaking off the surveillance effort during the forenoon watch on 5 June 1971, Davis fueled at Ponta Delgada (8 June) and Bermuda (12 June) and reached her home port on 14 June. Underway for the ammunition anchorage off Prudence Island, she off-loaded all ammunition prior to going into the yard for her post-shakedown availability. Standing out of her home port on 25 June, she returned to Boston on 1 July to wrap up her ASW modernization, yard workers toiling on projects that ranged from major boiler work to the installation of variable depth sonar (VDS) and AN/WSA-1C and a secure voice system, as well as modifications that would allow the ship to have a vertical replenishment capability. Returning to Newport on 4 October 1971 upon conclusion of the yard work at Boston, Davis on-loaded ammunition at Prudence Island on 6 October, and a little over a week later, put out into Narragansett Bay on 14 October for another test of the recently installed VDS, but gyro problems within the system precluded a successful test. The ship showed her versatility and adaptability, however, by standing in for another ship to participate in the U.S. Naval Destroyer School cruise, serving as a venue for training prospective engineering officers, in company with guided missile destroyer Charles F. Adams and destroyer Fiske.

Beginning on 1 November 1971, Davis, again in company with Charles F. Adams and Fiske, got underway for the operations and weapons portions of the underway curricula, conducting maneuvering drills, gunfire support training, surface target shoots, antiaircraft shoots and navigation training, as well as ASW exercises with submarine Clamagore, a replenishment drill with the underway replenishment oiler Milwaukee, general quarters drills, and "practical instruction in every facet of the jobs of prospective Destroyer Operations and Weapons Department Heads." The trio of ships punctuated that training regimen with a visit to Halifax, Nova Scotia, beginning on 5 November. Returning to Narragansett Bay on 12 November, Davis provided her embarked students with ship-handling experience, mooring to a buoy or going alongside a pier, thus concluding her Destroyer School work.

Less than a week later, on 17 November 1971, the ship got underway once more for the Narragansett Bay operating areas, and conducted another VDS sea trial, finally accepting the installation as complete, as well as taking a group of officer candidates to sea. As the month of December came, a Nuclear Weapons Assistance Team visited the ship, and Davis participated in Exercise Snowtime 72–3. She also hosted an open house for dependents and friends and gave an early (11 December) Christmas party for the children of Davis's crewmen.

Underway on 4 January 1972 for Cuban waters, Davis visited New Orleans (8–11 January) en route. Arriving at Guantanamo on 14 January, however, she hastily refueled and stood out, returning to sea for another stint of "special operations," occasioned by the report by the small Panamanian-flag motorship Johnny Express that she had been fired upon off the eastern tip of Cuba in mid-December 1971, and that a Cuban gunboat had attempted a boarding. Consequently, Davis received "Express Tasking" - escort duties and patrol of the Windward Passage and "Northern Choke Point" areas. She escorted the merchantman Omar Express to Port au Prince, Haiti, without incident (16–17 January), then, relieved on station by destroyer Basilone on 19 January, returned to Guantanamo. After refueling, Davis effected a rendezvous with the Bahamas Line motorship Lincoln Express and convoyed her safely to the Caicos Passage. Returning to Guantanamo on 21 January, Davis completed her refresher training in subsequent days, including NGFS training at Culebra.

Davis returned to Newport on 4 February 1972, then got underway to conduct type training off the Virginia capes in company with the guided missile escort ship Julius A. Furer and participated in ComPTuEx 72–8. Pausing from her training long enough to visit New York City (17–19 March), Davis, with ComDesRon 20 embarked, conducted more type training, including towing drills, and carried out extensive ASW exercises with submarine Skipjack (20–25 March). Returning to her home port on 25 March, the ship underwent tender repairs alongside Grand Canyon, as well as prepare for LantReadEx 4-72 prior to her slated deployment to the Mediterranean. Underway on 28 April, Davis, along with other Newport-based ships, participated in LantReadEx 4–7, then put back into her home port on 10 May after a rough passage "with high winds and heavy seas being the rule," and continued preparations for sailing for the Mediterrnanean. Soon thereafter, however, DesRon 20 received word that it was not to join the Sixth Fleet, but the Seventh. "Due to the short notice," DesRon 20's historian noted, "hasty WESTPAC [Western Pacific] preparations had to be made: publications had to be obtained; OPORDERS had to be modified; RPS [Registered Publications System] materials had to be drawn; new transit tracks had to be worked out."

==== Vietnam War third deployment ====
Davis and guided missile frigate Dewey departed Newport on 4 June 1972, rendezvoused with America off Cape Henry, Virginia, and set course for the Philippines; six days later, Admiral Elmo Zumwalt, the Chief of Naval Operations, sent a message to the Vietnam-bound ships. "The intensified aggression by the North Vietnamese has required expeditious augmentation of Yankee Station forces to protect U.S. lives in SVN [South Vietnam]. The enemy has increased the level of hostilities and has embarked on a campaign designed to disrupt Vietnamization efforts. It is our job to hold the line. The following weeks will require the fullest of your professional competence. Many teammates are in position and await your arrival."

Joined on 15 June 1972 by the oiler Waccamaw, slated to provide "refueling services until it was certain that the ships had sufficient fuel to [enable them to] arrive in Subic Bay with a 30 per cent reserve," the ships rounded the Cape of Good Hope on the "first day of the South African winter, but the cloudy skies and blustery seas," wrote Dewey's historian, "did not prevent Americas COD [Carrier On-board Delivery] aircraft from flying several tons of much-awaited mail from Cape Town out to the ships..." On the same day Waccamaw was detached (26 June), the ships "chopped" to the Seventh Fleet. Consequently, America, Dewey and Davis reached the Philippines on 6 July 1972, "completing a 13,000 mile transit remarkable for the degree of cooperation and coordination among the ships involved..." Upon her arrival at Subic, Davis received .50-caliber machine guns, Redeye missiles and filled her magazines (4-8 July), then sailed for her first gunline deployment in the waters off Quảng Trị province, South Vietnam.

While "gunfire support, rearming and refueling" characterized the routine of a destroyer off the coast of Vietnam, rescue operations broke the routine. On 19 July 1972, 37-millimeter antiaircraft fire hit an F-4D Phantom II of the 7th Tactical Fighter Squadron, during a mission to destroy PAVN bunkers near the DMZ, forcing both crewmen to eject. Davis and Eversole proceeded to the scene and rescued one crewman each.

Detached from the gunline on 23 July 1972, Davis stood to the south, proceeding to Military Region II, where, as part of TU 70.8.2, she provided gunfire support for ARVN troops near Bồng Sơn. She served as flagship for the task unit from 30 July to 1 August. On 10 August, an in-bore explosion tore off two feet of the barrel of gun mount 51, injuring four men; fragments penetrated the deck in several places, prompting Daviss detachment from TU 70.8.2. Proceeding to Subic, the ship received a low-pressure modification to mount 51 (13–25 August) that slowed the firing rate from 40 to 20 rounds per minute, but increased its reliability. While in port, however, the ship's sounding and security patrol found water in compartment 3-44-4-E. After the de-watering process, investigation revealed a defective fire plug; damage to the sonar equipment resulted in its being left behind for repairs when Davis returned to the gunline on 25 August.

After transporting ComDesRon 20 out to the destroyer Sarsfield on 27 August 1972, Davis relieved Eversole on that date as plane guard for the attack carrier Midway. Returning to the gunline on 1 September, Davis joined other units of TU 75.9.1 in evading a passing typhoon, returning to the gunline soon thereafter (4–11 September). "Chopping" to TU 77.1.2 to participate in Operation Linebacker, Davis pounded targets along the coast of North Vietnam over ensuing days, taking hostile fire upon occasion, the closest rounds splashing 50 yards (46 m) from the ship. Following an unsuccessful search and rescue (SAR) attempt (14–18 September), Davis operated on the gunline (19 September), then resumed Linebacker operations on 19 September. A second SAR operation proved more successful three days later, when a helicopter reached the downed airman when Davis was within a few miles of him.

Detached from Linebacker on 26 September 1972, Davis proceeded to Sasebo via Subic, and underwent a restricted availability (RAV) in that port (1–9 October) while dependents flew in to visit men serving in the ship. She resumed Linebacker raids as a unit of TU 77.1.1 on 12 October, carrying out nightly shelling and maintaining surveillance of merchantmen from the People's Republic of China lying off Hon La and standing ready to prevent any cargoes from reaching the beach. On 15 October, Davis conducted the first of several operations wherein she launched air-filled plastic bags that contained "mini-radios" that "when winds and tides permitted, floated ashore to enable the North Vietnamese people to hear non-Communist radio programming.

With ComDesRon 20 embarked, Davis became the flagship of TU 77.1.1 on 17 October 1972, and in that capacity she conducted her final strike mission of the deployment, when, on 21 October, she shelled North Vietnamese railroad sidings, highway bridges and coastal defense sites in company with guided missile light cruiser Providence, the guided missile destroyer Hoel and destroyer James E. Kyes, 25 miles (40 km) south of Thanh Hóa. While James E. Kyes and Hoel provided suppressing fire, Davis and Providence closed to within 12,000 yards (11,000 m) of the beach, pounding four primary targets. Coastal defense guns located on Hon Me took the cruiser and destroyer under fire but hit neither ship. Davis, taking station astern of Providence during the retirement phase, shelled the offending batteries for 15 continuous minutes, counting 31 secondary explosions and encountering no more firing from the guns.

Relieved of Linebacker duties, Davis rendezvoused with escort ship Joseph Hewes and the latter's LAMPS helicopter spotted for the two ships' bombardment of North Vietnamese batteries on Hon Gio, Davis firing the last of the 8,315 rounds of 5"/54 of the deployment. The ships then proceeded to Hong Kong for two days of rest and recreation. After outchopping at Subic (29–31 October), Davis, with Capt. Claiborne S. Bradley, ComDesRon 20, embarked, then visited Singapore in company with Dewey and Joseph Hewes, the trio becoming TU 27.8.4 for the homeward voyage.

==== Post Vietnam ====
Dropping anchor at Sitra, Bahrain, on 15 November 1972, Davis and her consorts then took part in Midlink XV, an exercise with U.S., British, Iranian and Pakistani naval forces, then enjoyed liberty at Bandar Abbas, Iran (18–20 November). Detached from Midlink XV, the task unit refueled from the British RFA Plumleaf A78 on 25 November. Crossing the Equator later that same day, Davis spent the night at Mombasa, Kenya (26 November). En route to Recife, Brazil, RFA Tidereach A96 accompanied TU 27.8.4 (29 November – 5 December), as did the anti-submarine frigate HMS Brighton (4–5 December). After visiting Recife (10–12 December), Davis arrived at Port of Spain, Trinidad, on 16 December, then got underway to proceed independently for Roosevelt Roads the next day. Preceded by more than 36 of her crew who obtained "earlybird" flights to the U.S., Davis departed Roosevelt Roads on 19 December 1972, rendezvoused with TU 27.8.4 on 20 December, then steamed into Newport on the morning of 22 December to begin a post-deployment stand-down period and upkeep that lasted through the end of the winter.

Davis departed Newport on 26 March 1973, and reached Charleston, South Carolina, on 2 April. Returning to her home port on 3 July, she sailed on 4 August for Guantanamo Bay, arriving there four days later. Operating out of Guantanamo, Davis shifted to Roosevelt Roads, making port on 20 August, then headed north, pausing at Earle (23 August) before continuing her return voyage to Newport, arriving there on 24 August. Dropping down to Earle, arriving on 20 September, Davis returned to Newport on 22 October, then sailed soon thereafter for Norfolk, arriving the following day. She returned to her home port on 3 November, then conducted operations at sea before returning to Earle on 12 December, returning thence to Newport, arriving on 13 December and remaining in port through the end of the year 1973.

Underway on 4 January 1974, Davis formally joined the Sixth Fleet ten days later at Rota (14 January), then sailed, with ComDesRon 24 embarked, on 16 January in company with escort ships Donald B. Beary and Voge, passing through the Strait of Gibraltar and entering the Mediterranean. She then visited a succession of ports: Saint-Tropez, France (19–21 January), Sanremo, Italy (25–31 January) and Valencia, Spain (1–4 February), cutting short the latter visit to get underway on eight-hour notice to carry out "special operations" in the Gulf of Hammamat (5–7 February). After visits to the Sicilian ports of Augusta (8–9 February) and Taormina (9–13 February), Davis then participated in International Week exercises (13–24 February). Another succession of port visits ensued, to the Italian ports of Rapallo (24 February – 2 March) and Naples (4–18 March), where she received a tender availability alongside Cascade, Corfu, Greece (19–24 March) and Dubrovnik, Yugoslavia (25–29 March).

Departing Dubrovnik on 29 March 1974, Davis rendezvoused with Amphibious Task Force 503 and took part in Dark Image, an amphibious assault exercise in the Adriatic complete with naval gunfire support drills. Upon the conclusion of Dark Image, Davis returned to Valencia (9–22 April), then called at Mahón, Menorca (23–27 April), before she took part in exercise Dawn Patrol (27 April – 5 May). Following a visit to Rhodes (9–12 May) bookended by time spent at Athens (5–8 May and 13–19 May), the ship carried out a period of underway operations, testing her sonar (19–25 May). After anchoring off Milos, Greece (25–29 March), Davis visited Iraklion (29 May – 3 June) and Souda Bay (3–6 June), Crete. After participating in another International Week exercise (6–8 June), she returned to Souda Bay (8–9 June), then the Greek locales of Mykonos (10–13 June) and Elefsis (14–16 June). Davis wound up her cruise with participation in exercise Flaming Lance (19–23 June) before putting in to Rota (23–24 June) for turnover with her relief.

Davis returned to Newport, her home since she first joined the fleet, on 3 July 1974, but lingered only a short time (3–9 July), for her home port, along with the other units of DesRon 20, to Charleston, South Carolina. On 11 July, she arrived at her new base. She operated thence through mid-December, carrying out two successive periods of underway operations (9–13 September and 1–4 October) followed by participation in ComPTUEx 3-75 (21–26 October). Following an InSurv inspection (4–7 November), Davis conducted one more period of underway operations for 1974 (9–12 December), then visited Port Everglades (12–14 December). Offloading weapons at the Naval Weapons Station, Charleston (17–18 December), Davis entered Charleston Naval Shipyard on 19 December 1974, where she remained for the next year, undergoing a regular overhaul that concluded on 19 December 1975.

Underway on 28 January 1976, the ship proceeded to Guantanamo Bay, whence she conducted refresher training (12 February – 11 March), after which time she underwent a SMORE inspection (22–26 March), then a tender availability (27 March – 23 April) at Charleston. Following sea trials (24 April), Davis underwent her nuclear weapons inspection (3–4 May), then a series of Operational Propulsion Plan Examination (OPPE) evolutions (13–14 May, 19–21 May and 27–28 May), before she carried out preparations for her next deployment (29 May – 30 June).

Davis, with ComDesRon 14 staff and a VC-6 drone detachment embarked, stood out of Charleston on 10 July 1976, and proceeded south in company with guided missile frigate MacDonough and frigate Thomas C. Hart. Over the next four months, Davis and her consorts participated in UNITAS XVII, operating with units of the Brazilian, Uruguayan and Argentine navies, and visiting Rio de Janeiro, Brazil, Montevideo, Uruguay and Recife, Brazil. Arriving at Punta Arenas, Chile, on 14 September, Davis transited the Strait of Magellan, then exercised with ships of the Chilean, Peruvian, Colombian and Venezuelan navies, and visited Valparaíso, Chile, Lima, Peru, Cartagena, Colombia and Caracas, Venezuela. On 23 November, the ship returned to her home port, then entered a tender availability period on 10 December, alongside Sierra.

Wrapping up her availability alongside Sierra on 14 January 1977, Davis got underway on 17 January to participate in CaribREx 1-77. Earning the "Top Gun" award for surface, antiaircraft and naval gunfire support shooting, as well as the "Top Hunter" kudos for her ASW work, Davis returned to her home port for largely concurrent restricted (23 February – 20 May) and tender (23 February – 5 April) availabilities, the latter again alongside Sierra. Following a naval technical proficiency inspection (NTPI) (3–4 May), the ship underwent another period of tender repairs, alongside Yosemite (25 May – 15 June), a part of which overlapped her restricted availability (3 June – 20 October) at her home port, at the conclusion of which she sailed for Africa.

Operating under ComDesRon 14, Davis visited Conakry, Guinea (1–2 November 1977) and Lagos, Nigeria (7–9 November), fueled at Dakar, Senegal (14 November) before she proceeded to Rota (19–20 November). Fueling at Cagliari, Sicily (23 November), then from Pawcatuck on 25 November, the destroyer stood in to Port Said on the 26th and transited the Suez Canal the next day. Visited Aqaba, Jordan, where she relieved guided missile destroyer Sellers (28 November) and became a part of the Middle East Force (MidEastFor). Following fuel stops at Djibouti (5 and 8 December), the ship then visited Hodeida, Yemen, a purely "diplomatic" call with no liberty for the crew (10–12 December). After a third stop at Djibouti for fuel (14 December), Davis crossed the Equator on 17 December, then continued on for Mombasa, arriving on 20 December to begin a visit that would last a little over a fortnight.

Sailing for Mombasa on 5 January 1978 with Rear Admiral Samuel H. Packer, ComMidEastFor, embarked, Davis steamed in the Red Sea, Gulf of Aden, into late February, punctuating those periods underway with weekly fuel stops at Djibouti and a visit to Muscat, Oman (25–28 January). After a period of upkeep at Bahrain, the ship conducted turnover with her reliefs, guided missile destroyer Barney and frigate Glover, at Jeddah, Saudi Arabia (9 April). Transiting the Suez Canal on 13 April, Davis reached Rota on 20 April and began her transatlantic passage. Fueling in the Azores (23 April), the destroyer visited Hamilton, Bermuda (28–29 April), and stood up the Cooper River on 2 May.

Davis remained at Charleston into the summer of 1978, logging an NWAT assist visit (14–16 June) and a TSI/NTPI inspection (19–20 June). She embarked midshipmen for training (18 July – 18 August) that extended into the ship's cruise to the Great Lakes. Departing Charleston on 3 August in company with destroyers William C. Lawe (Captain William D. Daniels, ComDesRon 34, Naval Reserve Force, embarked) and Robert A. Owens, Davis visited a succession of ports, acquainting residents with the U.S. Navy and aiding in recruiting efforts in that region. In company with William C. Lawe and Robert A. Owens, she visited Quebec (8–10 August) and Montreal (10–11 August), Canada; and the New York ports of Ogdensburg (12–14 August), Oswego (14–16 August) and Buffalo (17–20 August). Davis then called at Ashtabula, Ohio (20–24 August), rejoining William C. Lawe and Robert A. Owens for a visit to Toledo, Ohio (24–28 August). The three ships then visited Detroit, Michigan (28 August – 1 September) and Cleveland, Ohio, arriving on 1 September. Robert A. Owens departed that port on 5 September, Davis and William C. Lawe the next morning. The task unit reassembled at Buffalo on 6 September, where Captain Billy B. Traweek relieved Captain Daniels as ComDesRon 34 NRF. Resuming the Great Lakes cruise, the destroyers visited Toronto, Canada (7–9 September); Davis stopped at Oswego for a CHT pump-out while the other two ships proceeded to Ogdensburg for the same purpose. After another pause at Montreal, the ships steamed up the Saint Lawrence Seaway. While William C. Lawe and Robert A. Owens paused at Halifax, Nova Scotia, Davis continued on for her home port, reaching Charleston on 17 September. There, she then underwent a restricted availability (1 November – 2 December) for necessary engineering repairs, then carried out an underway period for certification (11–16 December), after which time she remained in port for the remainder of 1978.

Underway once more on 16 January 1979, Davis took on stores and received turnover briefs at Rota (28–30 January), then proceeded into the Mediterranean to begin her deployment. After a visit to Livorno, Italy (6–11 February), she participated in exercises at sea, capped by a visit to Dubrovnik (19–24 February). Clearing that Yugoslavian port to participate in National Week exercises, at 22:30 on 25 February Davis was ordered to proceed to Middle East. Reaching Port Said on 28 February, she transited the Suez Canal (1–2 March), then operated in the Red Sea and the Gulf of Aden until 15 March. Having gone from the Second Fleet to the Sixth, thence to MidEastFor, the ship became a part of the Seventh Fleet, operating with a part of its carrier force, until 9 April. Visiting Djibouti again (9–11 April), Davis then stood into Port Said on 15 April to transit the Suez Canal. Reaching Catania, Sicily, on 19 April 1979, to begin a four-day visit, Davis then spent 17 days at Athens (30 April – 15 May) for upkeep "amid rumors of yet another trip to the Middle East." Twelve hours after departing Athens on 15 May, Davis received orders sending her back to the Suez Canal. Transiting that waterway on 18 May, she fueled at Port Sudan (21 May), then spent two days at Berbera, Somalia (26–27 May), where she hosted the U.S. Ambassador to Somalia Donald K. Petterson and military attachés from China, Egypt, and Italy. The officials of Berbera gave the ship six goats. After crossing the Equator for the fourth consecutive year (4 June), Davis visited Mombasa (6–12 June), then Djibouti (19–20 June). After a passage through the Suez Canal (25 June), she reached Rota (1–2 July) before standing out for her homeward bound voyage, arriving at her home port on 14 July. Off-loading ammunition (16–17 August), Davis then commenced a regular overhaul at Charleston Naval Shipyard on 28 September and entered drydock on 8 November.

=== 1980s ===
Completing her overhaul on 10 December 1980, Davis remained in port into late January 1981, punctuating that time with local operations and independent ship exercises (6–14 January), steaming thence to Port Everglades to carry out weapons systems accuracy trials (27 January – 7 February) and then returning to her home port. Departing Charleston for Guantanamo Bay on 13 March to begin five weeks of refresher training, visiting Port au Prince during a breather in the work, Davis next headed for Roosevelt Roads to conduct naval gunfire support exercises, climaxed with a visit to Charlotte Amalie, U.S. Virgin Islands. Returning to Charleston on 3 May, Davis underwent an IMAV/NWAI. Departing her home port on 12 June, the ship operated as part of the Nimitz Battle Group in ComPTUEx 2-81, conducting extensive ASW and AAW exercises during that time, after which she enjoyed rest and recreation at Frederiksted, U.S. Virgin Islands. Detached from the Nimitz Battle Group upon conclusion of that period, Davis returned to Charleston on 30 June to prepare for her next extended deployment.

Sailing for the Mediterranean on 13 August 1981, Davis reached Rota on 22 August and joined the Sixth Fleet. After departing Rota on 24 August, she transited the Strait of Gibraltar, then proceeded along the Spanish coast to Cartagena, which she visited (26–30 August), providing "hotel services" while anchored out to submarine Whale as the latter moored alongside. Moving on to Naples (2–5 September), she then conducted a War-At-Sea exercise with the Nimitz Battle Group (6–8 September) before conducting calling at Alexandria, Egypt (9–11 September) and Ashdod, Israel (13–23 September), receiving a tender availability alongside Puget Sound at the latter port. Proceeding thence for the Suez Canal, Davis, accompanied by Voge, prepared for trouble in the wake of the recent signing of an accord between Libya, Ethiopia and Yemen, but accomplished the passage of the Bab-el-Mandeb "with no confrontation" on the night of 27 September.

After pausing for fuel at Djibouti (28 September 1981), Davis joined the America Battle Group for operations in the Arabian Sea (29 September – 18 October). Carrying out high-priority ASW and AAW, as well as surveillance, evolutions, the ship also carried out an exchange program with the Royal Australian Navy guided missile destroyer HMAS Hobart exchanging six people with her "down under" opposite number over each of the three days. Participating in a Gonzo Regatta at the conclusion of that period, competing in both gig and motor whaleboat events, Davis won the former race, with Rear Admiral Bryan W. Compton, Commander, Carrier Group 6, presenting the award to the boat officer.

Transiting the Strait of Hormuz on 19 October 1981, Davis entered the Persian Gulf for what would become "nearly constant underway time," punctuated by fuel stops and liberty at Bahrain and Jubayl, Saudi Arabia. At the former place, Rear Admiral Charles E. Gurney, III, Commander, MidEastFor, presented 57 members of Daviss complement with Navy Achievement Medals "for meritorious performance during the deployment," while at the latter, the ship hosted the commanding officer of the King Abdulaziz Naval Base and the Amir of Jubayl. Upon completion of the "surveillance and showing the flag tour" on 16 November, the destroyer headed west, made a high-speed passage of the Bab-el-Mandeb and Red Sea, then moored at Jiddah (23–25 November), hosting U.S. Ambassador to Saudi Arabia Richard W. Murphy, as well as 200 Royal Saudi Navy students during that visit (24 November).

Departing Jiddah on 26 November 1981, the ship transited the Suez Canal the following day. Encountering heavy seas upon entering the Mediterranean, she then carried out exercises off the coast of Libya, transited the Strait of Messina, and visited Marseille, France (2–5 December). After a transit of the Strait of Gibraltar, Davis visited Rota for turnover procedures (9–11 December), then sailed for home with ComDesRon 20 embarked. She reached Charleston four days before Christmas, to begin the first of three shifts of leave for her people upon arrival and ending the year in "normal inport routine."

Following her post-deployment stand-down, and sea trials off Charleston, Davis departed her home port on 25 January 1982 for operations in the Caribbean and gunfire support exercises off Vieques. After visiting San Juan (1–5 February), she proceeded thence for a port call upon Port Everglades (7–11 February), where she embarked a group of sons of her officers and men for the cruise back to Charleston, where she arrived on 13 February. Following an InSurv inspection (1–3 March) and sea trials in the operating areas off her home port, Davis got underway on 8 April to participate in ReadEx 2-82 and Ocean Venture 82, rendezvousing with elements of Amphibious Group 2 off the North Carolina coast, proceeding thence to screen those ships and provide gunfire support support for the landings at Vieques, earning a score of 86.4 in the latter role and destroying two target sleeves during another phase of the evolutions. Punctuating her participation in the exercises by a visit to Charlotte Amalie (16–19 April) and two to Roosevelt Roads for fuel (24–25 April and 6–8 May), Davis returned home on 12 May.

Following two NWAT visits (19–21 May 1982 and 7–9 June) and an ammunition onload at the Naval Weapons Station, Charleston (21-22 June), Davis conducted ASW exercises in the operating areas off her home port, utilizing the services provided by two submarines and ASW P-3C Orions. Over the ensuing months (July–August), the crew learned of "growing evidence to expect de-commissioning in late December..." but the ship deployed on 23 August to participate in United Effort/Northern Wedding-82, "an operation of NATO [North Atlantic Treaty Organization] forces larger than any peacetime exercise before." Joining the America Battle Group off the Virginia capes, Davis steamed across the North Atlantic, conducting exercises and replenishing from NATO warships off the Irish coast, steaming into the region of the Shetland Islands and into the North Sea, where the group disbanded and Davis proceeded independently into the English Channel (15 September), and mooring at Southampton, England, on 16 September, the first U.S. Navy warship in recent memory to visit that port.

Underway on 22 September 1982 for the short transit to Brest, France, Davis visit (23–26 September) was cut short by growing tensions in the eastern Mediterranean, in and around Lebanon. Davis rejoined the America Battle Group to conduct "contingency operations" and transited the Strait of Gibraltar, then proceeded immediately into the Ionian Sea to exercise with elements of the Turkish and Greek navies ("the first such joint effort," Davis's chronicler noted, "between [those] two navies in recent times") as well as other NATO units during exercise Display Determination 82.

After escorting America back to the northern waters of the Caribbean Operating Area, Davis returned to her home port on 20 October 1982, and commenced "the decommissioning process...in earnest." After an ammunition offload at the Naval Weapons Station, Charleston, the ship underwent an Inactive Ships Maintenance Facility inspection (16–17 November).

== Fate ==
USS Davis was decommissioned on 20 December 1982, stricken from the Naval Vessel Register on 27 July 1990 and sold for scrap to the Fore River Shipyard and Iron Works at Quincy, Massachusetts, on 11 December 1992. When the company went bankrupt, she was resold to N. R. Acquisition Incorporated of New York City by the Massachusetts Bankruptcy Court and scrapped by Wilmington Resources of Wilmington in North Carolina.
