= George Fleming Davis =

United States Navy Medal of Honor recipient

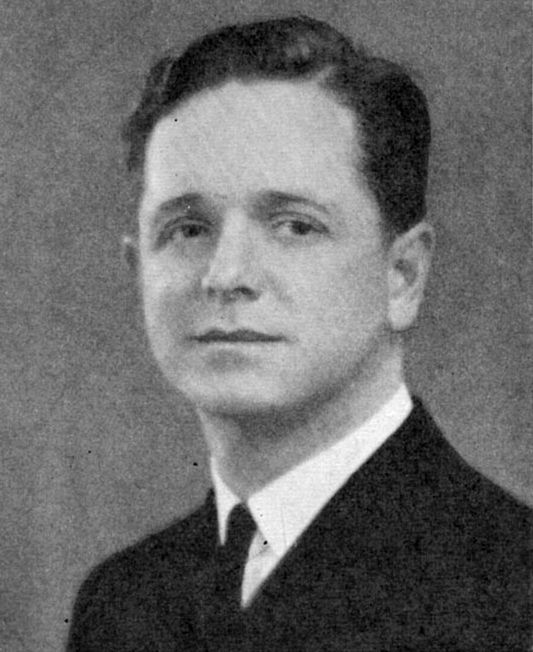
- Commander George F. Davis
- Born: March 23, 1911; Manila, Philippines
- Died: January 6, 1945 (aged 33) †; USS Walke, Lingayen Gulf, off Luzon, Philippines
- Burial place: off Luzon, Philippines
- Military career
- Allegiance: United States
- Branch: United States Navy
- Service years: 1934–1945
- Rank: Commander
- Commands: USS Walke (DD-723)
- Conflicts: World War II
- Awards: Medal of Honor; Silver Star; Legion of Merit; Purple Heart

George Fleming Davis (March 23, 1911 – January 6, 1945) in Manila, Philippines. He was a United States Navy officer and a recipient of America's highest military decoration, the Medal of Honor, for actions during World War II.

== Early life ==
George F. Davis was born in Manila on March 23, 1911.

== Navy career ==
Davis was appointed to the United States Naval Academy from the Naval Reserve in 1930 and graduated in May 1934. Ensign Davis' first duty station was the new heavy cruiser USS Tuscaloosa (CA-37). While on that ship, he served as an aircraft gunnery observer with her embarked aviation units. From 1939 to 1941, Lieutenant (Junior Grade) Davis served as an officer of the destroyer USS Broome (DD-210) and the fast minesweeper USS Hopkins (DD-249).

=== Outbreak of World War II ===
Following promotion to the rank of lieutenant in mid-1941 he was assigned to the battleship USS Oklahoma (BB-37), which was sunk on December 7, 1941, when Japan's surprise attack on Pearl Harbor opened the Pacific War.

In January 1942, Lieutenant Davis was transferred to the light cruiser USS Honolulu (CL-48), in which he participated in operations in the Aleutian Islands, the hard fighting over Guadalcanal and the Central Solomons, and the campaign to recover Guam. He was promoted to lieutenant commander and commander while serving in Honolulu, which he left in mid-1944. Following training in advanced surface warfare techniques, he was given command of the destroyer USS Walke (DD-723) in late November 1944. On 6 January 1945 his ship was covering minesweeping operations in advance of the Lingayen Gulf invasion when she was attacked by four Japanese Kamikazes. Though Walke shot down two, the third plane struck the ship, enveloping her bridge area in burning gasoline. Though horribly burned, Commander Davis remained on his feet, conned the ship, directed damage control efforts and saw to the destruction of the fourth suicide plane. Only when Walke's survival was assured did he relinquish his post to be taken below, where he died a short time later.

For his conduct, Commander Davis was posthumously awarded the Medal of Honor. His body was buried at sea.

== Awards and honors ==
His awards include:

Medal of Honor		Silver Star
Legion of Merit w/ Combat "V"	Purple Heart	Combat Action Ribbon
Navy Unit Commendation	American Defense Service Medal w/ Fleet Clasp (3/16" Bronze Star)	American Campaign Medal
Asiatic-Pacific Campaign Medal w/ two 3/16" Silver Stars	World War II Victory Medal	Philippine Liberation Medal

=== Medal of Honor citation ===
Commander George F. Davis' official Medal of Honor citation is as follows:

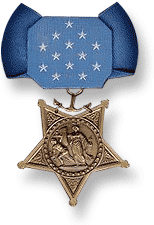

For conspicuous gallantry and intrepidity at the risk of his life above and beyond the call of duty as Commanding Officer of the U.S.S. Walke engaged in a detached mission in support of minesweeping operations to clear the waters for entry of our heavy surface and amphibious forces preparatory to the invasion of Lingayen Gulf, Luzon, Philippine Islands, 6 January 1945. Operating without gun support of other surface ships when four Japanese suicide planes were detected flying low overland to attack simultaneously, Commander Davis boldly took his position in the exposed wings of the bridge and directed control to pick up the leading plane and open fire. Alert and fearless as the Walke's deadly fire sent the first target crashing into the water and caught the second as it passed close over the bridge to plunge into the sea off portside, he remained steadfast in the path of the third plane plunging swiftly to crash the after end of the bridge structure. Seriously wounded when the plane struck, drenched with gasoline and immediately enveloped in flames, he conned the Walke in the midst of the wreckage; he rallied his command to heroic efforts; he exhorted his officers and men to save the ship and, still on his feet, saw the barrage from his guns destroy the fourth suicide bomber. With the fires under control and the safety of the ship assured, he consented to be carried below. Succumbing several hours later, Commander Davis, by his example of valor and his unhesitating self-sacrifice, steeled the fighting spirit of his command into unyielding purpose in completing a vital mission. He gallantly gave his life in the service of his country.

== Legacy ==
The destroyer USS Davis (DD-937), 1957–1994, was named in his honor.

== See also ==
- List of Medal of Honor recipients
- List of Medal of Honor recipients for World War II
