= USS Brumby =

1964 Garcia-class frigate

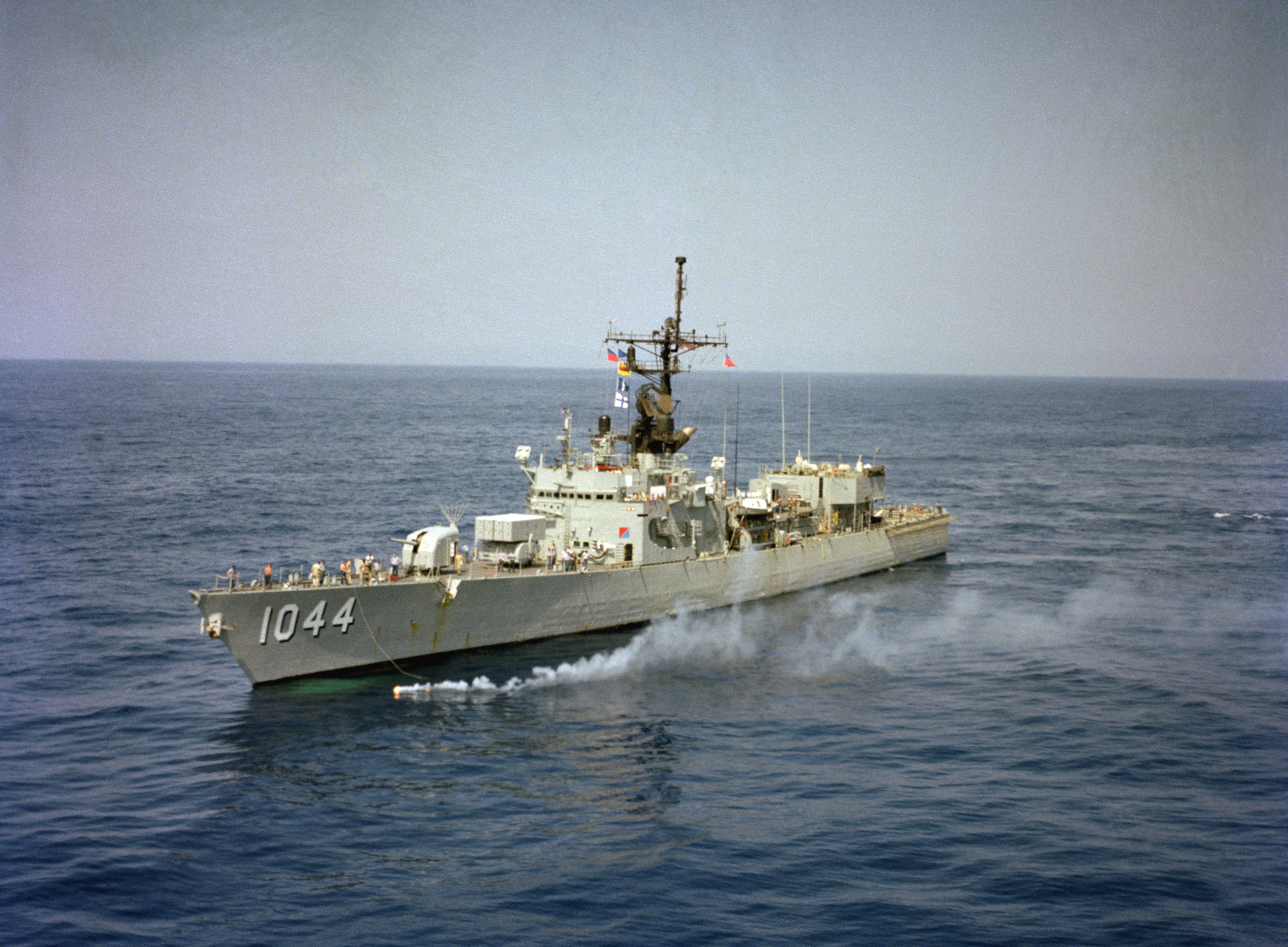

History

United States
- Name: USS Brumby
- Namesake: Frank H. Brumby Thomas Mason Brumby
- Awarded: 3 January 1962
- Builder: Avondale Shipyards
- Laid down: 1 August 1963
- Launched: 6 June 1964
- Acquired: 26 July 1965
- Commissioned: 5 August 1965
- Decommissioned: 31 March 1989
- Reclassified: Frigate 30 June 1975
- Stricken: 1 July 1994
- Identification: DE-1044 (1965); FF-1044 (1975)
- Motto: Venator et Vastator (Hunter and Destroyer)
- Fate: Sold for scrapping 9 September 1994

General characteristics
- Class & type: Garcia-class frigate
- Displacement: 2,624 tons (light)
- Length: 414 ft 6 in (126.34 m)
- Beam: 44 ft 1 in (13.44 m)
- Draft: 24 ft 6 in (7.47 m)
- Propulsion: 2 Foster Wheeler boilers, 1 steam turbine, 35,000 shp (26,000 kW), single screw
- Speed: 27 knots (50 km/h; 31 mph)
- Range: 4,000 nmi (7,400 km; 4,600 mi) at 20 kn (37 km/h; 23 mph)
- Complement: 16 officers; 231 enlisted
- Sensors & processing systems: AN/SPS-40 air search radar; AN/SPS-10 surface search radar; AN/SQS-26 bow mounted sonar
- Armament: 2 × single 5 in (127 mm)/38 cal. Mk 30 guns; 1 × 8-tube RUR-5 ASROC Mk16 launcher (16 missiles); 6 × 12.75 in (324 mm) Mk 32 torpedo tubes, Mk 46 torpedoes; 2 × MK 37 torpedo tubes (fixed, stern) (removed later)
- Aircraft carried: Gyrodyne QH-50 (planned) / SH-2 LAMPS

USS Brumby (FF-1044) was a Garcia-class destroyer escort (and later a frigate) in the US Navy. She was named after Lieutenant Thomas M Brumby and his nephew, Admiral Frank H. Brumby. The ship was in US Navy service from 5 August 1965 to 31 March 1989 and was in Pakistan Navy service from 1989 to 1994 as Harbah.

== History ==
Brumby was built in the early 1960s. Her keel was laid down at Avondale Shipyards, Louisiana on 1 August 1963. She was launched and Christened 6 June 1963 and co-sponsored by Adm. Brumby's granddaughters, Muriel Tuckerman Fitzgerald and Cornelia Truxtun Fitzgerald. Brumby was commissioned at Charleston 5 August 1965.

Brumby deployed to northern Europe and the Mediterranean Sea in 1967. The ship visited Oslo, Norway, Kiel, Germany, Norrköping, Sweden, Ferrol, Spain, Naples, Italy, Valletta, Malta, and Castellammare del Golfo, Sicily. Brumby was towed to Portsmouth Norfolk Naval Shipyard on or about January 1968 and remained until her boilers were repaired. Brumby departed Norfolk November 1968 to return to homeport Newport RI. In January 1969 Brumby departed Newport en route to GITMO for refresher training. One weekend, while moored off of Guantanamo Bay, Brumby's sonar dome became damaged by the anchor chain. The ship completed training between late February and early March, then sailed to the Boston shipyard dry dock to have the sonar dome repaired.

Brumby departed Naval Station Mayport on 28 November 1970 for a Mediterranean Deployment, returning 3 May 1971. The ship visited Bermuda, Ponta Delgada, Azores, Rota, Spain, Souda Bay, Crete, Piraeus, Greece, Augusta Bay, Sicily, Valletta, Malta, Split, Yugoslavia, Palermo, Sicily, Palma de Mallorca, Mallorca, Naples, Italy, and Barcelona, Spain. Brumby spent several weeks, around the New Year, shadowing the Soviet helicopter carrier Leningrad.

While deployed in 1972, Brumby experienced boiler damage and was towed from Scotland by USS Preserver (ARS-8) arriving in Charleston, SC, 15 November 1972. The cause of the steam generators rupturing a total of 36 of the steam tubes was a failure of the engineering department to properly monitor and maintain the required level of chlorides in the system. The level of chlorides should be less than 1 PPM (parts per million) to avoid chloride stress corrosion, and the level in the system was over 16;000 PPM.

Brumby deployed to South America 21 July 1975 to 8 December 1975. The ship visited Cartagena, Colombia, Chile, Montevideo and Rio de Janeiro.

Brumby received the Navy Expeditionary Medal for service relating to Iran / Indian Ocean, in 1980.

Brumby received the Navy Expeditionary Medal for service relating to Lebanon in 1983.

In 1984, Brumby deployed to the Mediterranean and Indian Ocean returning in November 1984. Brumby was selected to join the 29th activation of NATO's Naval on Call Force – Mediterranean (NAVOCFORMED), a predecessor to Standing NATO Maritime Group 2. The force was activated at Ancona, Italy and included the Italian frigate Alpino (F 580), the Turkish destroyer Piyalepasa (ex-Fiske), HMS Brazen (F91) and the Greek destroyer Sachtouris (ex-USS Arnold J. Isbell (DD-869)). During the deployment, the ship also visited Puerto Cortés, Honduras, Rota, Monaco, Nice, Naples and others. The ship transited the Suez Canal and spent 102 continuous days at sea during the deployment.

Brumby received the Coast Guard Unit Commendation for winter law enforcement operations from 1 November 1985 to 28 February 1986.

Brumby received the Coast Guard Meritorious Unit Commendation for 1 October 1986 to 30 June 1987.

== Fate ==
On 31 March 1989 Brumby was decommissioned and leased to the Pakistan Navy the same day, where she was commissioned as Harbah. However, following Pakistan's refusal to halt its nuclear weapons program, the lease was cancelled in 1994. She was returned to United States custody on 9 September 1994 and stricken from the Navy Register the same day. Brumby was sold for scrapping for $635,602.50 ($1.38 million today) on 9 September 1994 to Trusha Investments Pte. Ltd.
