= USS Walke (DD-723) =

Allen M. Sumner-class destroyer

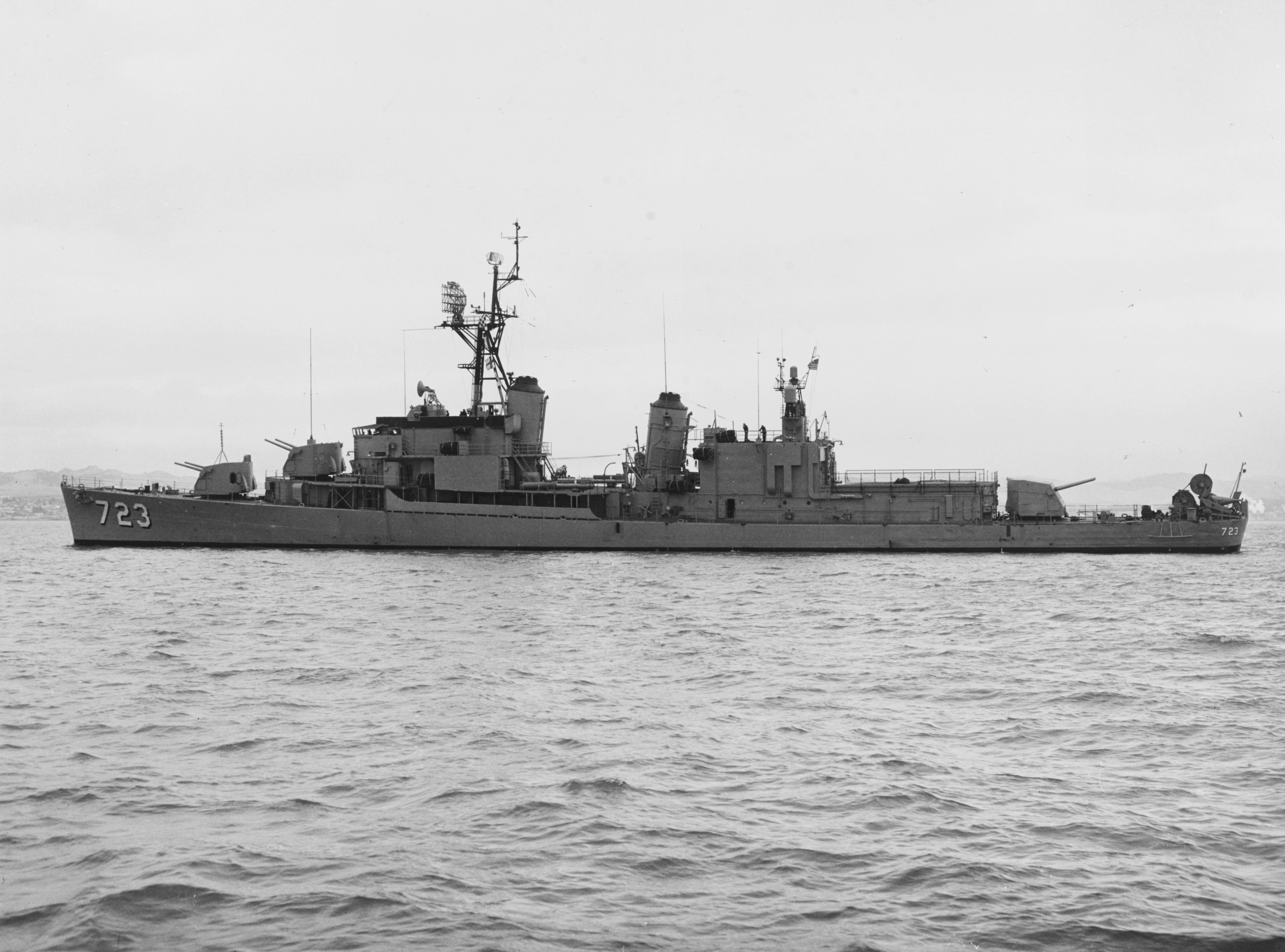
- USS Walke (DD-723)

History

United States
- Name: Walke
- Namesake: Henry A. Walke
- Builder: Bath Iron Works
- Laid down: 7 June 1943
- Launched: 27 October 1943
- Commissioned: 21 January 1944
- Decommissioned: 30 November 1970
- Stricken: 1 February 1974
- Fate: Sold 16 April 1975 for scrapping

General characteristics
- Class & type: Allen M. Sumner-class destroyer
- Displacement: 2,200 tons
- Length: 376 ft 6 in (114.76 m)
- Beam: 40 ft (12 m)
- Draft: 15 ft 8 in (4.78 m)
- Propulsion: 60,000 shp (45,000 kW); 2 propellers
- Speed: 34 knots (63 km/h; 39 mph)
- Range: 6,500 nmi (12,000 km; 7,500 mi) at 15 kn (28 km/h; 17 mph)
- Complement: 336
- Armament: 6 × 5 in (127 mm)/38 cal. guns; 12 × 40 mm AA guns; 11 × 20 mm AA guns, 10 × 21 inch (533 mm) torpedo tubes, 6 × depth charge projectors, 2 × depth charge tracks

USS Walke (DD-723), an Allen M. Sumner-class destroyer, was the third ship of the United States Navy to be named for Henry A. Walke, a Rear Admiral during the Mexican–American War and the American Civil War. The third Walke (DD-723) was laid down on 7 June 1943 at Bath, Maine, by the Bath Iron Works and launched on 27 October 1943; sponsored by Mrs. Douglas Dillon. The ship was commissioned at the Boston Navy Yard on 21 January 1944.

== Service history ==
=== World War II ===
After fitting out at the Boston Navy Yard, Walke got underway on 12 February for Washington, D.C., which she visited from 14 to 18 February before heading for Bermuda and shakedown training. She returned to Boston on 19 March 1944 for availability before moving to Norfolk, Virginia, to conduct high-speed, over-the-stern fueling exercises with Aucilla under the auspices of the Bureau of Ships. From Hampton Roads, the destroyer moved to Key West, Florida, at the end of the first week in April to conduct antisubmarine warfare (ASW) tests on a new type of sound gear. She completed that duty on 17 April and headed to Norfolk where she arrived two days later for almost a month of duty training nucleus crews for newly constructed destroyers.

On 12 May, Walke got underway for New York where she arrived the following day. On 14 May, she headed for European waters to participate in the Normandy invasion. She arrived in Greenock, Scotland, on 24 May. As a unit of Destroyer Division (DesDiv) 119, Walke participated in the Normandy invasion between 6 and 26 June. On 7 and 8 June, she conducted shore bombardments, destroying blockhouses and machine-gun positions as well as helping to repulse a counterattack mounted by German armored units. On 23 and 24 June, the warship supported minesweeping operations at the Bombardment of Cherbourg and duelled with enemy shore batteries.

After the Allied ground forces had pushed the fighting front inland out of range of the destroyer's guns, Walke departed European waters on 3 July and arrived at the Boston Navy Yard on 9 July. Following repairs there and refresher training at Casco Bay, Maine, she sailed south and arrived at Norfolk on 26 August.

Four days later, the ship departed Norfolk in the screen of the aircraft carrier Ticonderoga, bound ultimately for the western Pacific. Steaming via the Panama Canal and San Diego, California, the destroyer arrived in Pearl Harbor on 25 September. She conducted training exercises there for almost a month before departing the Hawaiian Islands on 23 October in the screen of North Carolina. Steaming via Eniwetok and Manus Island, she arrived in Ulithi on 5 November. There, she became a unit of Task Group (TG) 38.4, of the fast carrier task force, with which she sortied that day for a series of air strikes on targets in the Philippines. The warship returned from that foray to Ulithi on 22 November and lay at anchor there until 27 November when she got underway with Destroyer Squadron (DesRon) 60 for the Philippines. She arrived in San Pedro Bay, Leyte, on 29 November and joined the screen of TG 77.2 operating in Leyte Gulf. She returned to the anchorage at San Pedro Bay on 4 December and remained there until 6 December when she departed with TG 78.3 to support landings from Ormoc Bay on the western coast of Leyte. The troops of the United States Army's 77th Infantry Division stormed ashore unopposed on 7 December, but the Japanese mounted heavy kamikaze attacks on the supporting ships in an attempt to foil the assault. During those air raids, Walke assisted the destroyer Mahan when three kamikazes of a nine-plane raid succeeded in crashing into her. After rescuing a number of Mahan's crewmen, Walke sent the stricken destroyer to the bottom with a torpedo and gunfire. The next day, en route back to San Pedro Bay, she helped to splash an attacking enemy aircraft. She safely reached her destination later that day and operated in Leyte Gulf and at San Pedro Bay until 13 December.

That day, she got underway with TG 77.3 to support the assault on Mindoro. She arrived off that island on 15 December as a part of Rear Admiral Berkley's close covering force, made up of one heavy cruiser, two light cruisers, Walke, and six other destroyers. Besides protecting the heavier elements from air and submarine attack, she destroyed by gunfire the grounded Wakaba. After completing that mission, she headed back to Leyte Gulf. En route, she drove off by antiaircraft fire several planes which approached her and arrived safely in San Pedro Bay on 18 December 1944.

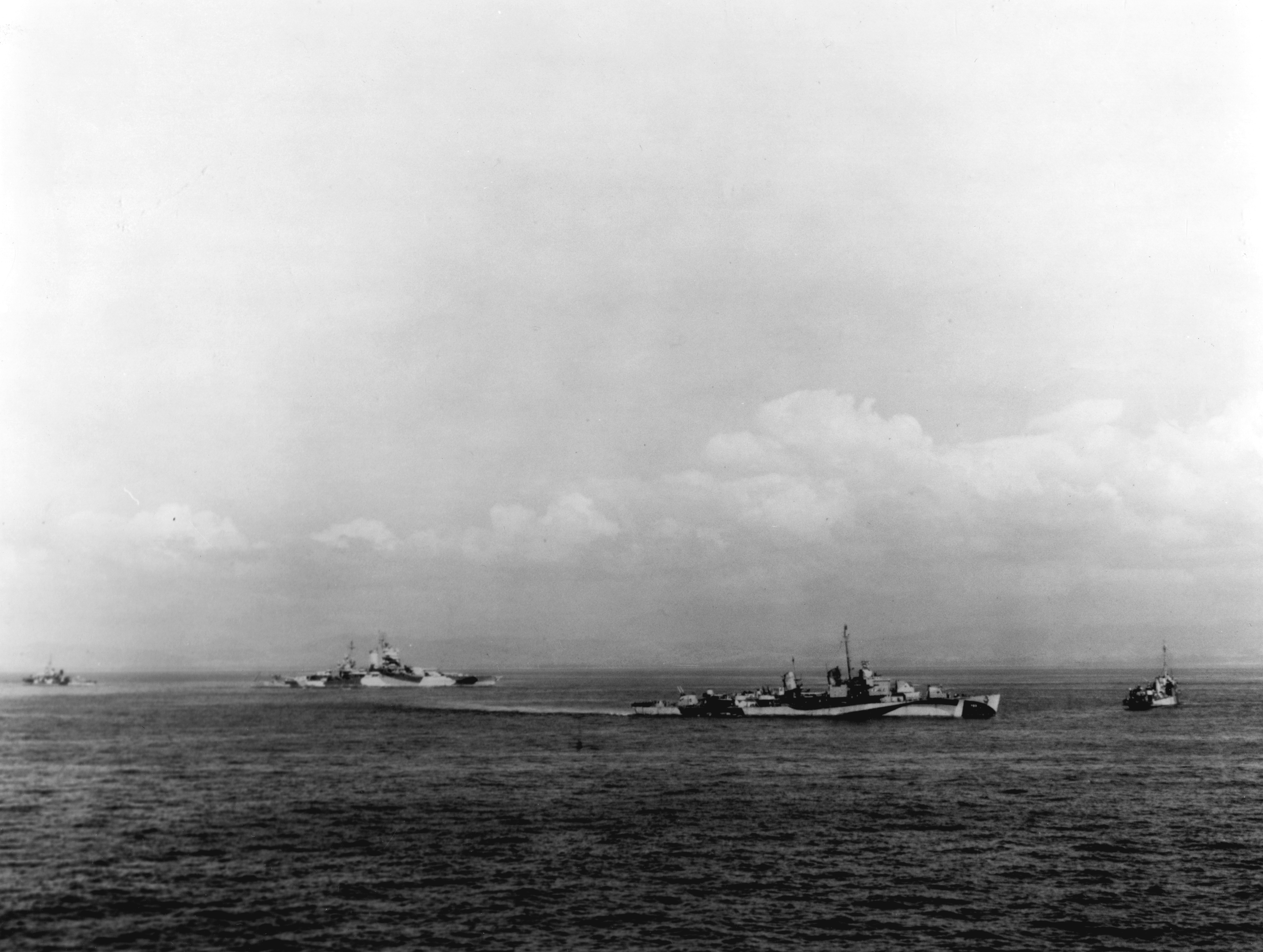
Walke (right center), along with battleship Mississippi, and two other destroyers cover the landings in Lingayen Gulf, 9 January 1945

The destroyer remained there until 2 January 1945 when she got underway for Lingayen Gulf and the invasion of Luzon. American minesweepers moved into the gulf on 6 January, and Walke steamed in with them to provide covering fire and antiaircraft defense. That day, four enemy Nakajima Ki-43 "Oscar" aircraft approached the destroyer from her starboard side forward, low on the water. She opened fire and succeeded in splashing the first two attackers. The third plane pressed home his combination strafing run-suicide attack and, though hit several times, managed to crash into Walke's bridge on the port side and burst into flames. The destroyer lost all communications, radars, gyro repeaters, and electricity throughout the superstructure. She also suffered extensive damage to the bridge itself as well as to her gun and torpedo directors. The 250-pound (110 kg) bomb the plane carried did not explode but passed completely through the ship in the vicinity of the combat information center.

Two minutes after the first kamikaze crashed into Walke, the last of the four "Oscars" began his dive. As this attacker came in toward the destroyer's starboard quarter, he was subjected to fire from 5-inch mount number 3 in local control and from the starboard side 40- and 20-millimeter guns. Their concentrated fire saved the ship from a second crash when the plane burst into flames and splashed into the sea close aboard. Soon thereafter, control was shifted aft to secondary conn, and fires were under control within 15 minutes.

Throughout the action, though seriously wounded and horribly burned, the warship's commanding officer, Comdr. George F. Davis, continued to conn his ship and exhorted her crew to heroic efforts to save the ship. Only after he was certain that she would remain afloat and intact, did he consent to relinquish command to the executive officer and allowed himself to be carried below. Comdr. Davis succumbed to his wounds several hours later; but, for his gallant action, he was awarded the Medal of Honor, posthumously. He was further honored by having the destroyer Davis named for him.

Walke continued to operate with TG 77.2 until after the landings on 9 January. The next day, she departed the gulf with Task Unit (TU) 78.4.2 and headed for Leyte. She arrived in San Pedro Bay on 13 January and remained there undergoing patching for two days before getting underway for the Admiralty Islands. She received further temporary repairs at Manus Island from 18 to 21 January and then resumed her voyage home, via Pearl Harbor. The ship reached the Mare Island Navy Yard on 6 February and began permanent repairs. The last of her extensive battle damage had been corrected by 4 April, Comdr. John F. McGillis took command of the ship and set a course—via Pearl Harbor, Eniwetok, and Ulithi— for Okinawa where, on 10 May, she joined the campaign to capture that island. During the first part of her stay in the Ryukyus, she served as a support ship on radar picket stations around Okinawa. On 24 June, she was ordered to join the screen of Task Force (TF) 32, the Amphibious Support Force, with which she operated until 23 July. The following day, she departed the Ryukyus in the screen of a task unit, bound for Leyte, and underwent an availability at San Pedro Bay from 28 July to 14 August. On the latter day, Walke and Barton got underway to rendezvous at sea with TF 38. The destroyer joined the screen of TG 38.3 on 18 August—three days after hostilities ended. On 10 September, she switched to the screen of TG 38.1 and operated with the fast carriers.

=== Post war ===
The warship remained in Japanese waters until 30 September when she headed via Guam for the northwest coast of the United States. She arrived in Seattle on 24 October and operated along the western seaboard until the following spring. On 18 March 1946, the ship departed San Diego for a round-trip voyage to Pearl Harbor, returned to San Diego on 10 April, and remained there until 13 May. After steaming back into Pearl Harbor on the 19th, she departed that port again two days later, but this time she continued west toward the Marshall Islands. She reached Bikini Atoll on 26 May and, for the next two months, supported the atomic tests carried out there, such as Operation Crossroads. She returned to Pearl Harbor on 15 August, remained overnight, and got underway for the west coast on 16 August. Walke entered San Diego on 22 August and then moved to the Mare Island Naval Shipyard for three months of repairs.

The warship returned to San Diego on 15 November and remained there through the end of the year. On 6 January 1947, Walke departed San Diego for Pearl Harbor whence she operated with the aircraft carrier Tarawa, and later with Shangri-La, on special duty under the auspices of the Commander, Naval Air Force Pacific Fleet. That duty lasted until 1 May when she joined the unit sent to Sydney, Australia, to commemorate the Battle of the Coral Sea. The ship returned to San Diego in mid-June and was decommissioned there on 30 June.

=== Korean War ===
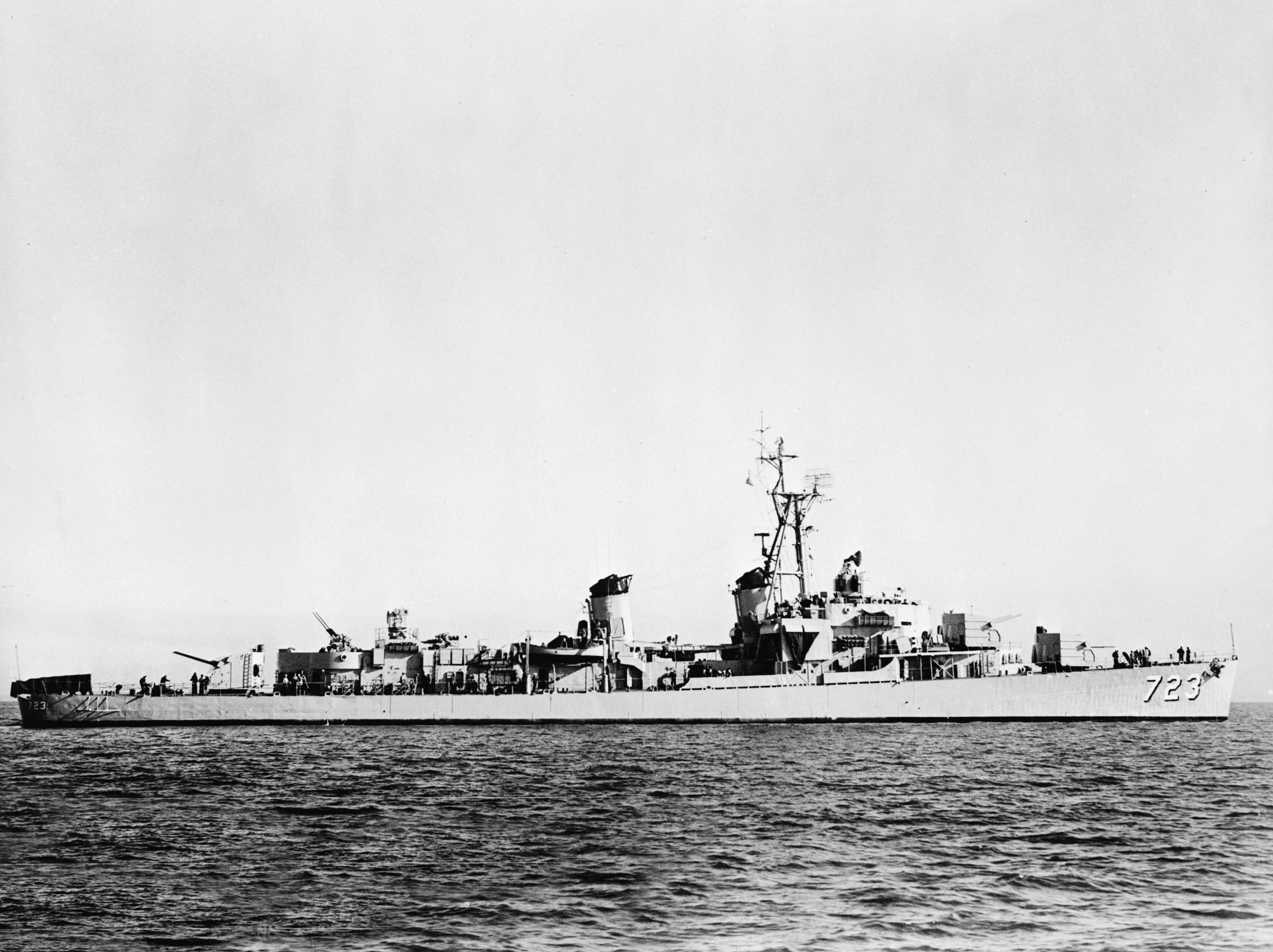
USS Walke off Korea, 1952–53.

Following a little over three years in the San Diego Group, Pacific Reserve Fleet, Walke was recommissioned on 5 October 1950 with CDR Marshall F. Thompson in command. After shakedown training along the west coast, the destroyer departed San Diego on 2 January 1951 and set a course for the Far East and service in the six-month-old Korean War. She repaired storm damage at Yokosuka, Japan, before joining TF 77 off the coast of Korea.

In addition to providing antisubmarine protection for the carriers of TF 77, she moved close to the Korean coast to contribute to the blockades of various enemy ports, such as Yondae Gap, Wonsan, Songjin, Chongjin, and Chuminjin as well as various other rail and road locations. On 12 June, while steaming some 60 miles off the Korean coast with TF 77, Walke struck either a floating mine, or was hit by a torpedo, which severely damaged her hull on the port side, killing 26 men and wounded another 35 sailors. The event was the deadliest suffered by the US Navy during the Korean War.

She made temporary repairs at Sasebo and then headed back to the United States where she entered the Mare Island Naval Shipyard in July for permanent repairs and a complete overhaul. Walke returned to the Korean combat zone in June 1952 and resumed screening duty with TF 77 punctuated by shore bombardment missions. That combat cruise lasted until January 1953, when she arrived in Long Beach, California, and took up normal west coast operations. In July, the warship rejoined TF 77 off the Korean coast for another seven months of duty screening the fast carriers; but, by that time, the armistice had been signed ending the combat aspect of her duties.

=== Post Korea ===
Between the end of the Korean War in July 1953 and the dramatic increase in American involvement in the Vietnam War that began in August 1964, Walke settled into a routine which alternated peacetime deployments to the western Pacific with periods of normal west coast operations out of Long Beach. In that interval, she made six deployments to the Orient, on each occasion operating as a unit of the 7th Fleet and usually as a part of the ASW screen of the fast carriers of TF 77. She also did periodic duty as a unit of the Taiwan Strait patrol. The ship made frequent visits to such ports as Sasebo and Yokosuka in Japan, Hong Kong, and Subic Bay in the Philippines. On her return voyage from the 1956 to 1957 western Pacific cruise, Walke visited Brisbane, Australia, before steaming back to Long Beach on 28 April 1957.

When not deployed to the Far East, the destroyer operated along the west coast conducting ASW and gunnery training and independent ship's exercises. Much of the time spent in the United States also went to repairs and overhauls. For instance, in 1961, she received a complete fleet rehabilitation and modernization (FRAM II) overhaul.

Minor Note: "Walke" can be seen berthed in an episode of Perry Mason filmed during this time period. (92 23 "The Case of the Slandered Submarine" Arthur Marks Samuel Newman N/A 14 May 1960 171–107 Cast: Hugh Marlowe (Commander James Page), Jack Ging (Seaman Robert Chapman), Robert H. Harris (Gordon Russell), Edward Platt (Commander Driscoll)[7]: 125–126 ) // (Wikipedia list of Perry Mason episodes)

=== Vietnam War ===
In 1964 and 1965, however, events in South Vietnam conspired to make Walke's final four deployments to the Far East combat tours. She departed Long Beach on 24 March 1965, steamed via Pearl Harbor, and arrived in Yokosuka, Japan, on 30 April. On 4 May, the destroyer headed for the Philippines. She entered Manila Bay on the 10th and joined ships of other SEATO navies. On 12 May, the warship sortied with them to participate in Exercise "Sea Horse" en route to Bangkok, Thailand. She arrived in Bangkok on 22 May and made a two-day liberty call. She returned to the Philippines, at Subic Bay, on 28 May. In June, the ship made a port call at Hong Kong and then headed to Sasebo, Japan, for upkeep and then spent the rest of the month in operations out of Japanese ports. Early in July, Walke paid a visit to Kaohsiung, Taiwan, and then did a four-week tour of duty on the Taiwan Strait patrol.

The ship's first direct participation in the Vietnam War came in August when she served as ASW picket ship for TG 70.4 on Yankee Station in the Gulf of Tonkin. She left Vietnamese waters on 17 August for five days of upkeep at Subic Bay. She returned to Yankee Station on 27 August and resumed ASW picket duty with TG 70.4. On 4 September, the destroyer moved inshore to provide gunfire support for troops operating ashore. That duty lasted until 9 September when she rejoined TG 70.4 on Yankee Station. At Yokosuka on 19 September, she had a four-day upkeep period before heading back toward the United States on 23 September.

Walke spent the remainder of 1965 and the first five months of 1966 engaged in normal west coast operations—mostly ASW exercises. On 9 June 1966, she departed Long Beach for another deployment to the western Pacific. However, while she was passing the outer breakwater, a major fire broke out in her after fireroom. The destroyer's damage control efforts succeeded in putting the blaze out; but, while the ship was being towed back into Long Beach on 10 June, her towline parted, and she ran aground. Later that day, she finally entered the Long Beach Naval Shipyard for repairs to both her hull and her main propulsion plant.

She completed repairs on 18 July, loaded ammunition at Seal Beach, and set a course for the Far East. She reached Yokosuka on 3 August for a brief fuel stop and then continued on to Sasebo where she arrived on the 5th. She remained there until the 8th, when she got underway for Yankee Station to join the ASW screen of TG 77.9. On 16 August, she took leave of TG 77.9 and set a course for Kaohsiung, Taiwan, and a tour of duty on the Taiwan Strait patrol. On 12 September, she headed back to Yankee Station; but, three days later, a typhoon forced her into Subic Bay. She resumed duty with TG 77.9 on 17 September but remained only until 22 September when she headed for the waters near Luzon to participate in SEATO Exercise "Silverskate."

She returned to Vietnamese waters on 29 September and took up station just offshore to provide gunfire support for the troops ashore. That duty lasted until 4 October when she headed back to the Philippines for another SEATO exercise before entering Subic Bay for a nine-day tender availability alongside the destroyer tender Bryce Canyon. She stood out of Subic Bay on 18 October and reached Yankee Station on 20 October and served with the carriers there for eight days. After a visit to Hong Kong, she set a course for Taiwan and another four-week tour of duty on the Taiwan Strait patrol. She concluded that assignment on 1 December and headed for Yokosuka where she underwent an upkeep period from 6 to 9 December. On 9 December, the warship got underway to return home. She arrived in Long Beach on 20 December and began post-deployment standdown.

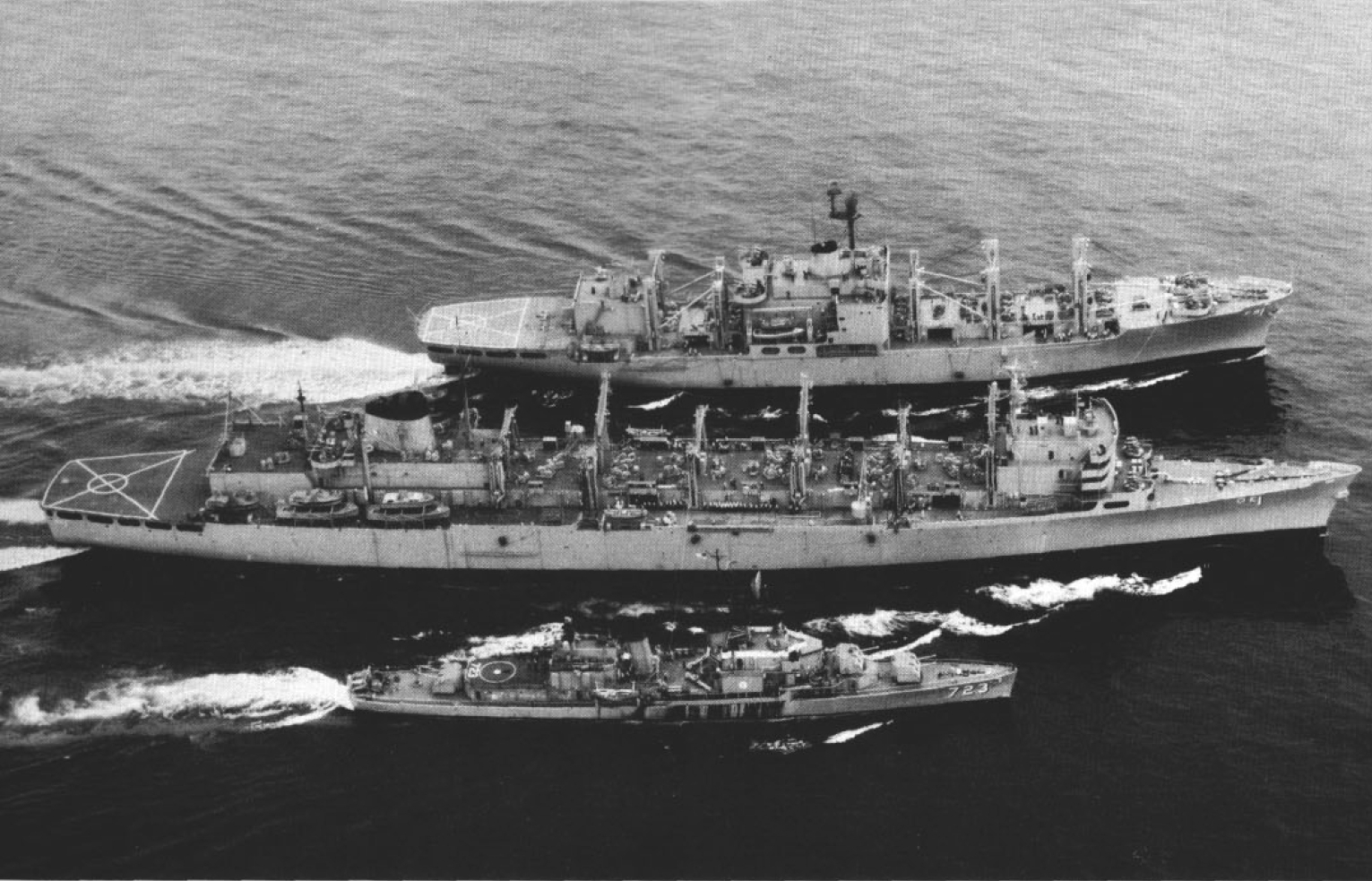
Sacramento refueling Mars and Walke in 1966.

Walke devoted the next seven months to local operations out of Long Beach. For the most part, this duty consisted of ASW exercises conducted with aircraft carriers. On 17 August, the destroyer departed Long Beach and set a course for the western Pacific. Steaming via Pearl Harbor, the warship arrived in Yokosuka on 24 September. She operated out of Japanese ports conducting ASW exercises until 18 October at which time she got underway for Yankee Station. The destroyer joined TF 77 in the Gulf of Tonkin on 23 October and served in the ASW screen until 16 November when she retired to the Philippines. She arrived in Subic Bay on 14 November and remained there ten days undergoing a tender availability. Following that, she put to sea to participate in another "Silverskate" ASW exercise which she completed on 28 November.

From there, the warship headed for the Gulf of Tonkin and duty with carriers on Yankee Station. That assignment lasted until 11 December at which time she moved inshore to provide gunfire support for troops operating ashore in the I Corps combat zone. On 17 December, she moved up the coast to the vicinity of the demilitarized zone between North Vietnam and South Vietnam to support troops fighting in that neighborhood. On 19 December, the ship departed Vietnamese waters and set a course for Sasebo where she arrived on 23 December.

On 3 January 1968, Walke departed Sasebo to return to Vietnam. She arrived in the combat zone on the 7th and spent the following month on the gunline providing gunfire support for troops fighting ashore. On 20 February, the warship shaped a course for Sasebo where she conducted an upkeep period. Following a series of ASW exercises in the Sea of Japan, she got underway on 24 March to return to the United States.

She arrived in Long Beach on 6 April and began post-deployment standdown. On 14 May, the destroyer entered the Long Beach Naval Shipyard for a four-month overhaul. At the conclusion of that repair period in September, she conducted shakedown training and then began normal west coast operations.

That duty continued until 29 March 1969 at which time she got underway for the final western Pacific tour of her career. Steaming by way of Pearl Harbor, she arrived in Yokosuka on 26 April. On 30 April, she set a course for the Tonkin Gulf. The destroyer joined the fast carriers on 5 May and provided ASW defense for them until 15 May when she headed for Subic Bay. Following upkeep at Subic Bay and a visit to Manila, she put to sea on 26 May to participate in SEATO Exercise "Sea Spirit." She returned to Subic Bay on 7 June, remained there until 10 June, and then headed back to Vietnam via Kaohsiung, Taiwan. The warship reached Yankee Station on 19 June and served in the ASW screen of TG 77.3 until July. She visited Kaohsiung again from 7 to 15 July and then headed for Sasebo where she arrived on 17 July.

The warship departed Sasebo on 18 July for Exercise "Sea King" before a brief return to Sasebo. Walke soon headed back toward Vietnam and reached Yankee Station on 25 July. She served there until 7 August and then headed back to Kaohsiung. She visited the Taiwanese port from 8 to 14 August and then made a call at Hong Kong from 15 to 22 August. She returned to Yankee Station on 25 August and served on the gunline until 21 September. She retired to Subic Bay on 23 September and, after five days, steamed back to Vietnam. She provided gunfire support in the I Corps combat zone and at Danang until 4 October when she shaped a course for Japan.

She conducted upkeep at Sasebo from 9 to 17 October and then got underway with the aircraft carrier Constellation for exercises in the Sea of Japan. After a return visit to Sasebo and a stop at Okinawa, she returned to Yokosuka to prepare for the voyage home. On 6 November, the destroyer sailed for the west coast. She made stops at Midway Island and at Pearl Harbor before arriving at Long Beach on 21 November.

=== Fate ===
Walke spent her last year of active service operating along the west coast. On 30 November 1970, she was decommissioned at the Puget Sound Naval Shipyard and was berthed with the Columbia River Group, Pacific Reserve Fleet, until 1974. On 1 February 1974, her name was struck from the Navy list. She was sold to General Metals, of Tacoma, Washington, on 16 April 1975 for scrapping.

Walke (DD-723) earned six battle stars during World War II, four battle stars in the Korean War, and seven battle stars for Vietnam service.
