= USS Fiske (DD-842) =

Gearing-class destroyer

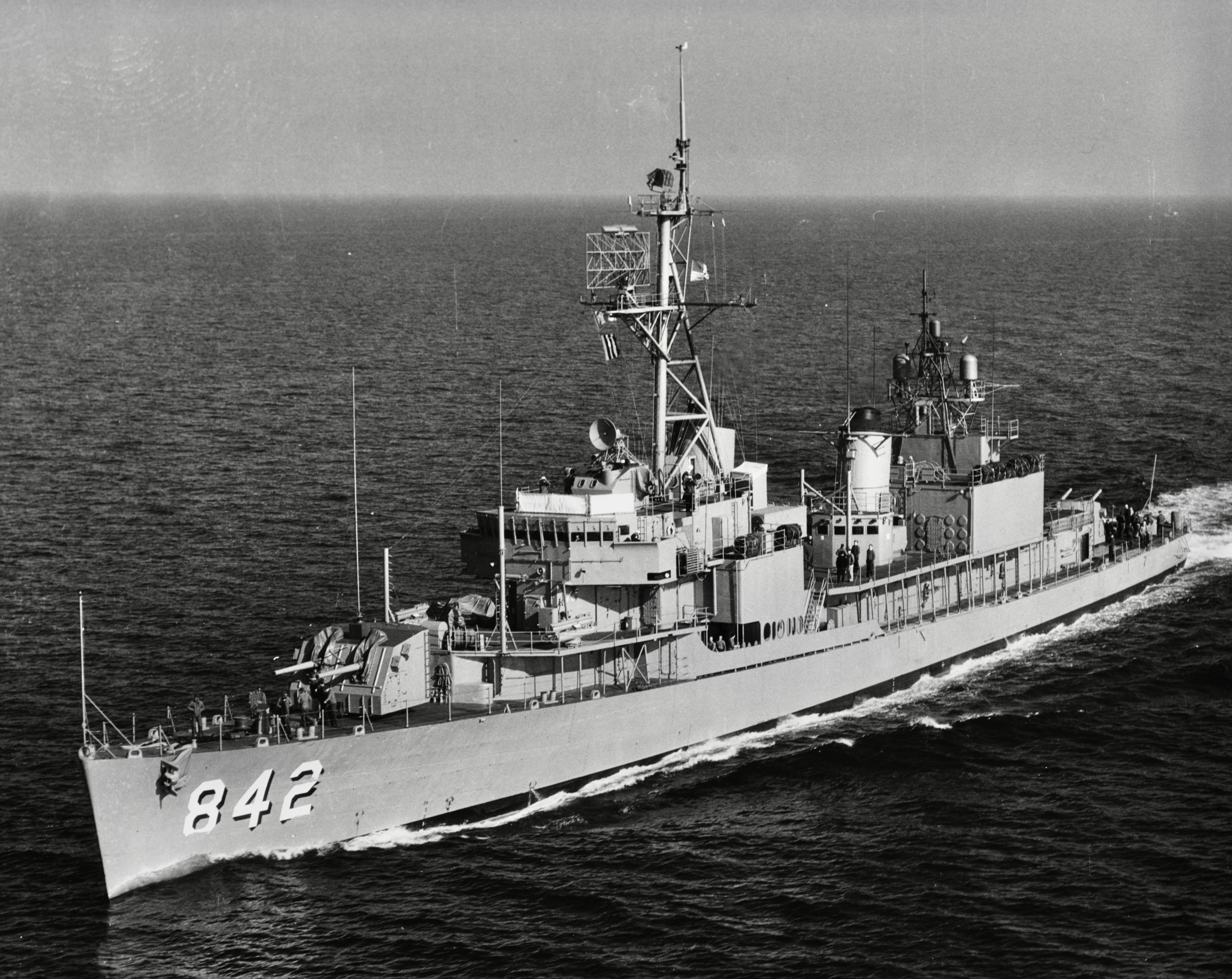
- USS Fiske (after FRAM I)

History

United States
- Name: Fiske
- Namesake: Bradley A. Fiske
- Builder: Bath Iron Works, Bath, Maine
- Laid down: 9 April 1945
- Launched: 8 September 1945
- Commissioned: 28 November 1945
- Reclassified: DDR-842, 18 July 1952; DD-842 1 April 1964
- Stricken: 6 August 1987
- Identification: Callsign: NBBU; Hull number: DD-842
- Motto: Watchdog of the Fleet (from 1952)
- Fate: Transferred to Turkey 5 June 1980

Turkey
- Name: Piyale Pasha
- Namesake: Piyale Pasha
- Acquired: 5 June 1980
- Identification: D350
- Fate: Scrapped 1999

General characteristics
- Class & type: Gearing-class destroyer
- Displacement: 3,460 long tons (3,516 t) full
- Length: 390 ft 6 in (119.02 m)
- Beam: 40 ft 10 in (12.45 m)
- Draft: 14 ft 4 in (4.37 m)
- Propulsion: Geared turbines, 2 shafts, 60,000 shp (45 MW)
- Speed: 35 knots (65 km/h; 40 mph)
- Range: 4,500 nmi (8,300 km) at 20 kn (37 km/h; 23 mph)
- Complement: 336
- Armament: 6 × 5"/38 caliber guns; 12 × 40 mm AA guns; 11 × 20 mm AA guns; 10 × 21 inch (533 mm) torpedo tubes; 6 × depth charge projectors; 2 × depth charge tracks

USS Fiske (DD/DDR-842) was a Gearing-class destroyer of the United States Navy, the second Navy ship named for Rear Admiral Bradley A. Fiske (1854–1942), inventor of the Stadimeter and the aerial torpedo.

Fiske was launched on 8 September 1945 by Bath Iron Works, Bath, Maine; sponsored by Mrs. F. E. Ribbentrop; and commissioned on 28 November 1945.

== Service history ==
=== 1945–1952 ===
Joining the Atlantic Fleet, Fiske served as an engineering school ship for Destroyer Force, Atlantic, out of Portland, Maine, and made three cruises to the Mediterranean for duty with the 6th Fleet from her home port at Newport, Rhode Island, prior to the outbreak of the Korean War. In addition, she took part in the regular schedule of training operations along the east coast and in the Caribbean where in 1948 she rescued 10 men from a small coastal freighter sinking in the Windward Passage.

On 3 January 1951, Fiske sailed from Newport for the Panama Canal and the Far East, reporting on 12 February to the 7th Fleet at Sasebo, Japan for duty in the Korean War. Along with screening carrier task forces, she patrolled off Korea, joined in bombarding shore targets, and escorted shipping from Japan to the action areas. Sailing westward for home, she arrived at Newport from her round-the-world cruise on 8 August 1951. Fiske was decommissioned on 1 April 1952 for conversion to a radar picket destroyer, and accordingly reclassified DDR-842 on 18 July 1952.

=== 1952–1963 ===
Recommissioned 25 November 1952, Fiske trained with her new equipment in preparation for her participation in the fall of 1953 in NATO Operation "Mariner," which took her north of the Arctic Circle. In 1954 she resumed her annual tours of duty in the Mediterranean, serving the carrier task forces of the 6th Fleet as radar picket.

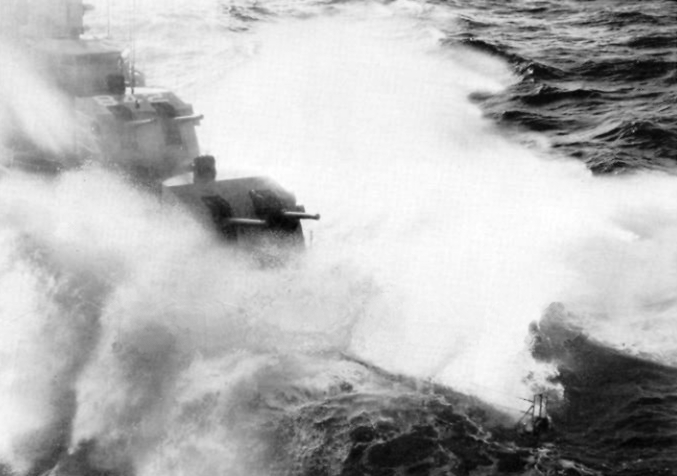
Fiske in heavy seas, ca. 1960.

Her training operations when assigned to the 2nd Fleet for duty in the western Atlantic and Caribbean included special work in development of anti-submarine warfare, and air defense. Homeported at Mayport, Florida, from August 1960, Fiske joined in NATO exercises north of the Arctic Circle in the fall of 1960, and at the close of the year, sailed for patrol duty in the Caribbean.

In October 1962 Fiske returned to Mayport from the Canary Islands where she had positioned herself for astronaut splashdown. On the evening of her arrival back home, and without her full crew, she was ordered to rendezvous with the Enterprise (CVAN-65) in the Windward Passage as the Soviets were challenging the United States in the Cuban Missile Crisis. DDR-842 then joined the 6th Fleet in the Mediterranean Sea in February 1963. Following this deployment another change of home port to Newport, Rhode Island, took place.

=== 1964–1965 ===
Fiske's classification reverted to DD-842 on 1 April 1964. Under the command of Cdr. John R. Ewing, Fiske underwent a Fleet Rehabilitation and Modernization (FRAM Mark I) at Brooklyn Navy Yard during 1964. Among other things, Fiske's second forward gun mount, Mount 52, was removed, and replaced by a pair of triple-mount Mark 32 torpedo tubes. The superstructure was replaced and an Anti-Submarine Rocket (ASROC) launcher and launch station was installed between the funnels on the 01 level. Aft of Stack 2 the superstructure was modified to include a Magazine (on the port side 01 level) for torpedoes, ASROC rockets and warheads, and depth charges for the DASH (Drone Anti-Submarine Helicopter) system, and a hangar starboard side 01 level for the two DASH helos. Aft of this superstructure the remainder of the 01 level was flight deck.

Trials began in December 1964 with a period of shakedown cruises between yard visits with several dry-dock periods. In the late winter of 1965 Fiske underwent Operational Readiness Inspection at Guantanamo Bay Naval Station, Cuba. After successful completion, she returned to her home port, and the rest of DesRon 12, at Newport Naval Station, Rhode Island.

On Mother's Day, 1965, all leaves and liberties were canceled and an emergency recall was sent out for immediate return to the ship. Fiske got underway about 0300 Monday morning, and headed south for the Dominican Republic, where a civil war had broken out. Fiske spent approximately one month patrolling the entrance to Santo Domingo Harbor, earning the Armed Forces Expeditionary Medal for her efforts.

Back in Newport, routine sea periods and a short period detached to Norfolk Naval Station for duty as escort to the newly commissioned America (CVA-66), undergoing sea trials during the late summer of 1965. A relaxed leave and liberty policy was the rule for the next six months as crew changes were made prior to the "Acey Deucy Squadron" (DesRon 12) deploying to Vietnam.

=== Vietnam, 1966 ===
On 19 January 1966, Fiske cast off all lines, and shifted colors as she got under way for Vietnam. In company with DesRon 12 – comprising DesDiv 121: Davis (DD-937) (flagship), Basilone (DD-824), Fiske, and Dyess (DD-880); and DesDiv 122: Richard E. Kraus (DD-849), Massey (DD-778), Fred T. Berry (DD-858), and Stickell (DD-888) – Fiske sailed south into the Caribbean, and through the Gulf of Mexico, transiting the Panama Canal on 25 January.

DesRon 12 then visited San Diego Naval Station for approximately eight hours on 5 February to pick up equipment, then got underway for Hawaii. On 10 February 1966, Fiske and Dyess participated in the rescue of the pilot of a small plane that ran out of fuel on the way to Hawaii. The pilot ditched and was picked up by Dyess. On 11 February, the Squadron moored at Pearl Harbor Naval Station, Hawaii. After five days in Hawaii, DesRon 12 got underway for the Philippine Islands, crossing the International Date Line on 18 February, as the crews entered the Realm of the Golden Dragon.

Fiske and the rest of "Acey Deucy Squadron" rounded the northern islands of the Philippine Archipelago on 27 February, and made port at Subic Bay Naval Station, Republic of the Philippines, on 28 February.

On 11 March, Fiske was underway for her first War Patrol. Fiske entered the Combat Zone on 12 March, and the crew qualified on 13 March for an Income Tax Exemption, and the Vietnam Service Medal. On 18 March, the crew qualified for Hostile Fire Pay. The remainder of March, 1966 was spent as escort and plane guard for the Ranger (CVA-61), and the Enterprise (CVA(N)-65) on "Yankee Station" off the "I Corps Operational Area".

Detached from escort duties on 1 April, Fiske entered the Gulf of Tonkin for duty as a Search and Rescue (SAR) ship, answering the first SAR call on 2 April, an operation involving a pilot and a rescue helicopter from Enterprise, though unable to assist, the helicopter with pilot aboard cleared North Vietnamese airspace en route to the Enterprise.

On the morning of 4 April, while engaged in a SAR patrol, Fiske came under fire from a North Vietnamese heavy shore battery. Unable to locate the battery which was apparently masked behind some coastal hills, Fiske turned away and resumed her patrol.

Fiske returned to Subic Bay where, on 21 April, a change of Command ceremony was held, with Cdr. William McKinley, USN, relieving Captain Ewing. After some port time in Subic Bay, Fiske was underway once again for another War Patrol. She joined the Hancock (CVA-19) on 26 April, and operated with her for the next ten days, with two short trips into the Gulf of Tonkin for SAR duty. Leaving Hancock, Fiske then re-joined Ranger, and escorted her to Yokusuka Naval Station, Japan, arriving on 12 May, and not departing until 25 May for her third War Patrol due to casualties to the Ranger, and to the John A. Bole (DD-755). She entered the Combat Zone on 28 May.

On 30 May, Fiske took up duty outside the Combat Zone as an Anti-Air Warfare Picket ship. On 6 June, Fiske relieved Davis (DD-937) of Naval Gunfire Support (NGFS) duties and escorted a truck convoy along the Coast Highway approximately 50 miles south to Da Nang, on her fourth War Patrol.

By 10 June, Fiske was moored for four days of liberty in Hong Kong, British Crown Colony. Departing for her fifth War Patrol on 14 June, Fiske arrived off Quảng Ngãi Province for NGFS duty the next day. She fired 119 rounds of 5 inch, 38 caliber ammunition at four target areas, destroying 18 structures, damaging trenches and ten other structures. The next day found Fiske on NGFS station off Da Nang, firing 57 rounds at four target areas, including Viet Cong caves, assembly areas, and one VC Observation Post. During a second mission that day an ammunition dump on a hill top was struck by Fiske's shells, which exploded the top of the hill.

17 June found the Fiske supporting the 2nd Battalion, 4th Division, U.S. Marines in "Operation Dodge" in the area of the ancient Vietnamese capital of Huế. During the next four days of "Operation Dodge", Fiske fired night illumination missions. Subsequently, Fiske was detached and ordered south to the "III Corps Operational Area" for a mission requiring Fiske to transit up the Mekong River nearly to Saigon. The mission was cancelled at the last minute, but not before some hands witnessed nighttime "Arc Light" B-52 raids, and "Puff" firing its Gatling guns from the air to the ground in the area of the Mekong River delta.

After an eight-day port call to Kaohsiung, Formosa, Fiske returned to Subic Bay on 5 July. Departing Subic Bay on the 6th, Fiske entered the Combat Zone for the sixth and final War Patrol, a short stint as a part of "Operation Market Time". Departing the Combat Zone later the same day, Fiske and the rest of the ships of DesRon 12 began the journey home.

=== 1966–1967 ===
On 8 July, the "Pollywogs" took over the ship, but revenge was taken the very next day. As Fiske crossed the Equator at Longitude 106 degrees, 27 minutes East, in the Singapore Strait, the segment of the crew that heretofore had never crossed the equator received justice from those who had: the "Shellbacks", and were mercifully, and most ceremonially converted from "Pollywogs" to "Shellbacks" after suffering the pains and torments required when entering the realm of King Neptune himself.

DesRon 12 headed west, with stops at Penang, Malaysia, then Cochin, India, and Aden Protectorate, British Crown Colony, through the Red Sea (complete with a desert sandstorm), and the Suez Canal. Entering the Mediterranean Sea, she anchored in the port of Piraeus, Greece, the port of Athens. Two more stops in early August, at Barcelona, Spain on the 4th for three days, and Gibraltar, British Crown Colony on the 9th for one day, Fiske entered the Atlantic Ocean, last seen in late January, and returned to the welcoming bands and families on the pier at Newport on 17 August. During the cruise, the Fiske circumnavigated the world, steaming over 54,000 miles (87,000 km). She spent 210 days away from homeport, 146 of which were at sea. Two days were spent transiting the two canals, Panama and Suez. Fiske replenished underway (UNREP) on 55 occasions, from Oilers, Refrigerator ships, and Cargo and Ammunition ships, and even completed an "unrep triple play" receiving oil, ammunition, and supplies all at one time from the new USS Sacramento.

Fiske then settled into her routine at Newport for a well-deserved rest, although an all-too-short one.

In May 1967 Fiske departed Newport, Rhode Island, for an extended Mediterranean cruise. The first stop along the way was a routine service stop at Gibraltar. Next came Malta for Liberty Call. Due to an escalating situation between Egypt and Israel over control of the Suez Canal Fiske was ordered to traverse the Suez Canal. After a day in Port Said she formed up with the other ships including the destroyer USS Dyess for the trip through the Suez Canal. This occurred at the beginning of the Six-Day War between Egypt and Israel.

The purpose of Fiske's presence was to protect US shipping interests in the area, assigned to monitor all ship traffic into and out of the Persian Gulf. In some cases boarding these ships as necessary. On occasion the ship was called upon to perform rescue missions when ships ran into trouble, as in one case when a freighter ran aground. Fiske remained in the Red Sea, Indian Ocean, and Strait of Hormuz areas until August. Liberty Ports of Call were unusual for US warships. They included Djibouti, French Somaliland; Massawa, Ethiopia; Bahrain; Karg Island, Madagascar; Diego-Suarez, and Mombasa, Kenya. Fiske treated Massawa as her "homeport" away from home.

The plan for Fiske to return to Newport was to include a stop at Caracas, Venezuela. These plans were quickly changed when the carrier USS Forrestal suffered numerous explosions and fires on 29 July 1967 while operating in Vietnam. New orders were to for Fiske to rendezvous with Forrestal off the coast of South Africa and provide an escort for her to Mayport, Florida. Fiske finally returned to Newport, Rhode Island, in September 1967.

=== 1967–1980 ===
In October 1967, CDR James S. Brunson (USN) assumed command. After a few months Fiske was sent to Boston Naval Shipyard for a complete overhaul. She remained in the yards until May or June 1968. Late summer she again deployed for another Mediterranean cruise returning early in 1969.

Fiske completed a six-month Middle East cruise July 1973 to her home port Newport, Rhode Island. She was then reassigned to the Navy Reserve Force and her homeport moved to the Military Ocean Terminal, Bayonne, New Jersey (MOTBY).

Fiske made many Reserve training weekend cruises from 1973 to 1976, including a 3-month Mediterranean cruise in 1974. Some ports visited were Naples, Barcelona, Malaga, and Rota. She was moored in Bayonne (New York Harbor) during the Bicentennial "Tall Ships". Fiske was overhauled again in 1976 and remained in the Naval Reserve force, stationed at Bayonne, New Jersey, (MOTBY).

She was transferred to Turkey on 5 June 1980. Fiske was stricken from the U.S. Naval Vessel Register on 6 August 1987.

== TCG Piyale Pasha (D350) ==
The ship served in the Turkish Navy as TCG Piyale Pasha (D350), named after Piyale Pasha. The ship was heavily damaged when she ran aground in late 1996; she was scrapped in 1999.

== In popular culture ==
The USS Fiske is shown in X-Men: First Class, where a crewman is recording the action with an 8mm camera.

== Awards ==
- Navy Occupation Service Medal, for service in Italian waters in 1946 and 1947
- 2 battle stars for Korean War service
- Navy Expeditionary Medal and the Armed Forces Expeditionary Medal for service with TF 135 during the Cuban Missile Crisis in 1962
- National Defense Service Medal for service after December 1960
- Armed Forces Expeditionary Medal for service in the Dominican Republic in May 1965
- 2 Vietnam Service Medals (the medal and one bronze campaign star in lieu of a second award) for service off the coast of Vietnam in 1966 during two campaigns:
  - Vietnam Counter-offensive, 25 December 1965 to 30 June 1966
  - Vietnam Counter-offensive II, 1 July 1966 to 31 May 1967
- Republic of Vietnam Gallantry Cross Unit Citation with Palm
