= USS Yellowstone (AD-41) =

Tender of the United States Navy

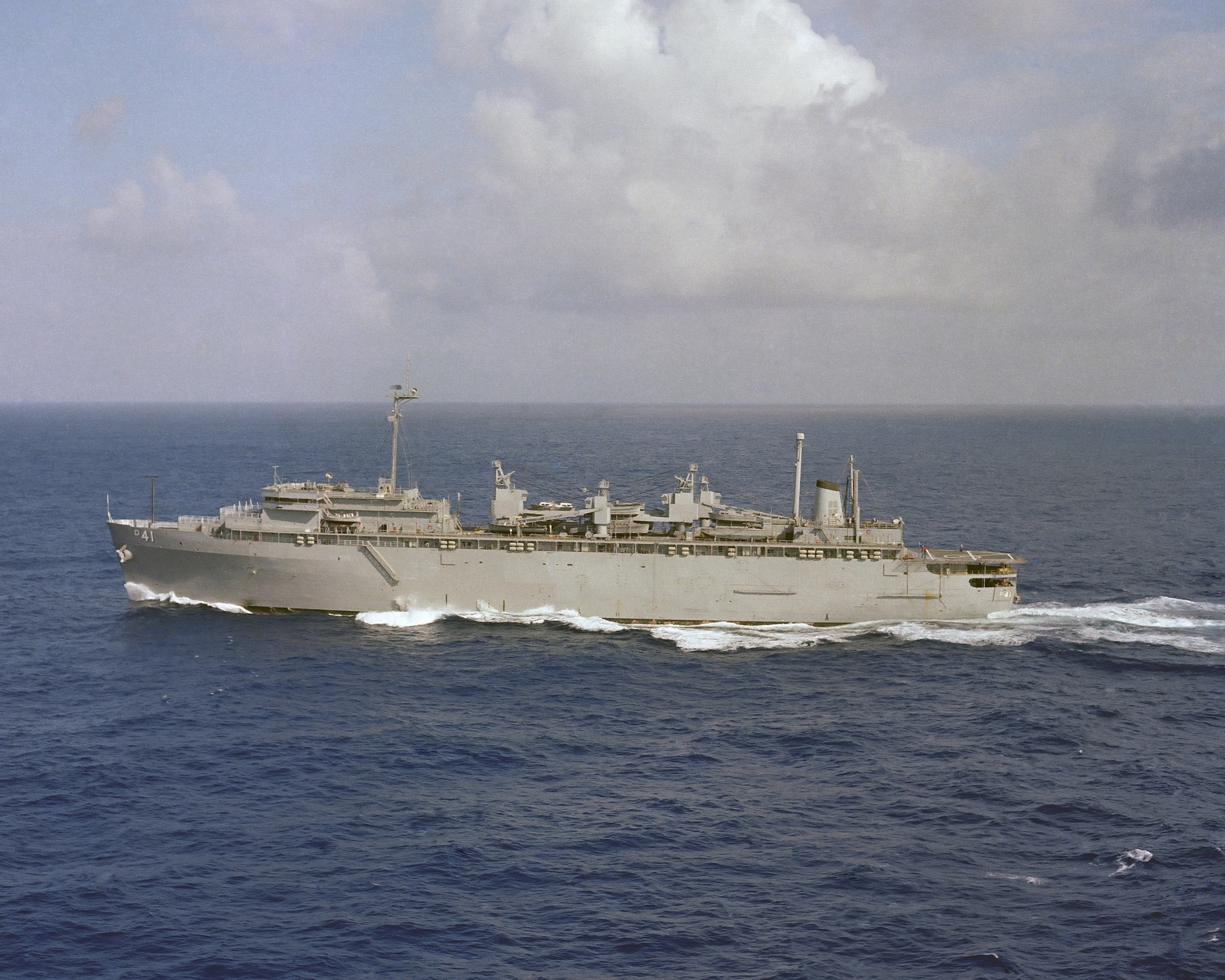

History

United States
- Name: USS Yellowstone
- Namesake: Yellowstone National Park in Idaho, Montana, and Wyoming
- Builder: National Steel and Shipbuilding Company
- Laid down: 27 June 1977
- Launched: 27 January 1979
- Commissioned: 28 June 1980
- Decommissioned: 31 January 1996
- Stricken: 4 July 1999
- Fate: Sold for scrap 2014

General characteristics
- Class & type: Yellowstone-class destroyer tender
- Displacement: 20263 tons
- Length: 642 ft (196 m)
- Beam: 85 ft (26 m)
- Draft: 27 ft (8.2 m)
- Propulsion: Steam Turbines
- Speed: 20 knots
- Complement: 87 Officers 1508 Enlisted
- Armament: 10 0.5 in (12.7 mm) machine guns, 2 20 mm cannons.

The third USS Yellowstone (AD-41) was the lead ship of the Yellowstone class of destroyer tenders in the United States Navy. These ships are also considered as flight II of the Samuel Gompers class of tenders built in the 1960s. The other ships in the class were: Acadia (AD-42), Cape Cod (AD-43) and Shenandoah (AD-44).

== Building and Commissioning ==
Yellowstone was laid down on 2 June 1977 at San Diego, California, by the National Steel and Shipbuilding Company; launched in January 1979; sponsored by Mrs. Donald C. Davis, the wife of Admiral Donald C. Davis, the Commander in Chief of the U.S. Pacific Fleet and commissioned on 28 June 1980, at the Mare Island Naval Shipyard, Vallejo CA. Following post-commissioning workups, Yellowstone transited from San Diego to her homeport of Norfolk, Virginia.

== Service history ==
Yellowstone deployed for the first time in support of NATO exercise Ocean Venture "81". During this deployment, the Repair Department, under simulated wartime conditions, completed over 100 jobs during a three-day anchorage in Scapa Flow, Scotland.

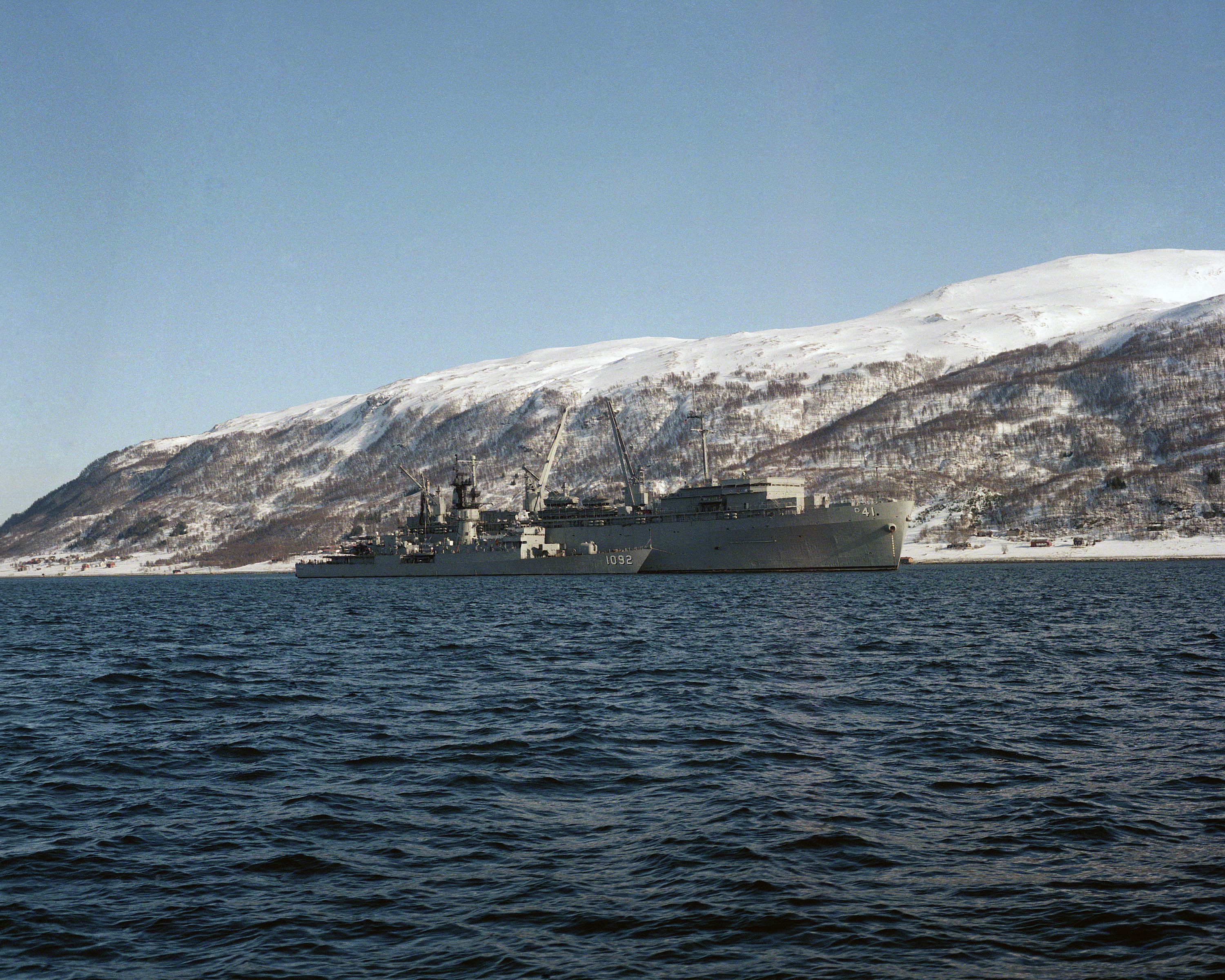
Yellowstone servicing the USS Thomas C. Hart off Norway, 1984.

In 1984, Yellowstone deployed for a second time for NATO exercise United Effort-Teamwork "84", Yellowstone completed over 300 jobs, sending "Tiger Teams" of repair personnel to other ships and providing logistic support by transferring repair parts and supplies and pumping fuel and water to ships of the task force. It was during this deployment that Yellowstone crossed the Arctic Circle officially becoming a "Bluenose".

1985 The ship made its first ever cruise to the Mediterranean Sea.

In May 1994 Yellowstone returned to her homeport of Norfolk, VA. Finishing up a work-intensive Mediterranean deployment, Yellowstone proved her reliability to the fleet through the many tasks it accomplished, living up to its nickname, "Old Faithful". Dedicating more than 119,088 man-hours throughout her four-month deployment, Yellowstone crewmembers completed more than 3,400 jobs through 17 major alongside repair availabilities on ships and 45 fly-away teams.

== Gulf War ==
During the Gulf War, the destroyer tenders Yellowstone (AD-41), and Acadia (AD-42) were deployed to provide the logistic requirements of a sustained naval presence. Based in the Red Sea port of Jeddah, Saudi Arabia, Yellowstone provided critical repair and rearming capability to the fleet. During seven months on station Yellowstone alone completed more than 10,000 repair jobs on 30 U.S. and allied ships. The Navy men and women serving aboard Yellowstone and the other tenders and repair ships provided a wide variety of services simultaneously to as many as five ships moored alongside or nearby. She also earned a Naval Unit Commendation for her service in the Gulf War. President George H. W. Bush also mentioned this ship by name as being the first naval command in a combat zone to have women serving on it.

== Decommissioning ==
After only 16 years of service to the fleet, Yellowstone was decommissioned on 31 January 1996, at Norfolk. Following the decommissioning ceremony, Yellowstone was placed in a stand-by status at the Naval Inactive Ships Maintenance Facility in Philadelphia. In order to maintain the readiness of the recently decommissioned destroyer tenders in case world events required further use, two Yellowstone-class destroyer tenders were placed in "reduced operating status" [ROS], partially crewed by Naval Reservists. The Military Sealift Command was responsible for lay berthing, maintaining, and operating the ships. Approximately 2,000 reservists filled billets in the repair, communications, supply (excluding food service), and medical/dental departments. Mobilization training for the Reservists took place at Shore Intermediate Maintenance Activities, Navy medical and dental facilities, and on board active tenders. After this period of "ROS" Yellowstone was transferred to the James River Reserve fleet and in 1999 she was struck from the Naval Vessel Register. On 28 July 2001, Yellowstone was transferred to the control of the Maritime Administration for further disposal. On 17 December 2014, the ex-Yellowstone was sold for dismantlement and removed from the James River Reserve Fleet and withdrawn from MARAD inventory. She was towed to Brownsville, TX, where her scrapping was completed by SteelCoast (formerly Esco Marine Inc) in 2018.
