= Klondike-class destroyer tender =

Class of US Navy ships

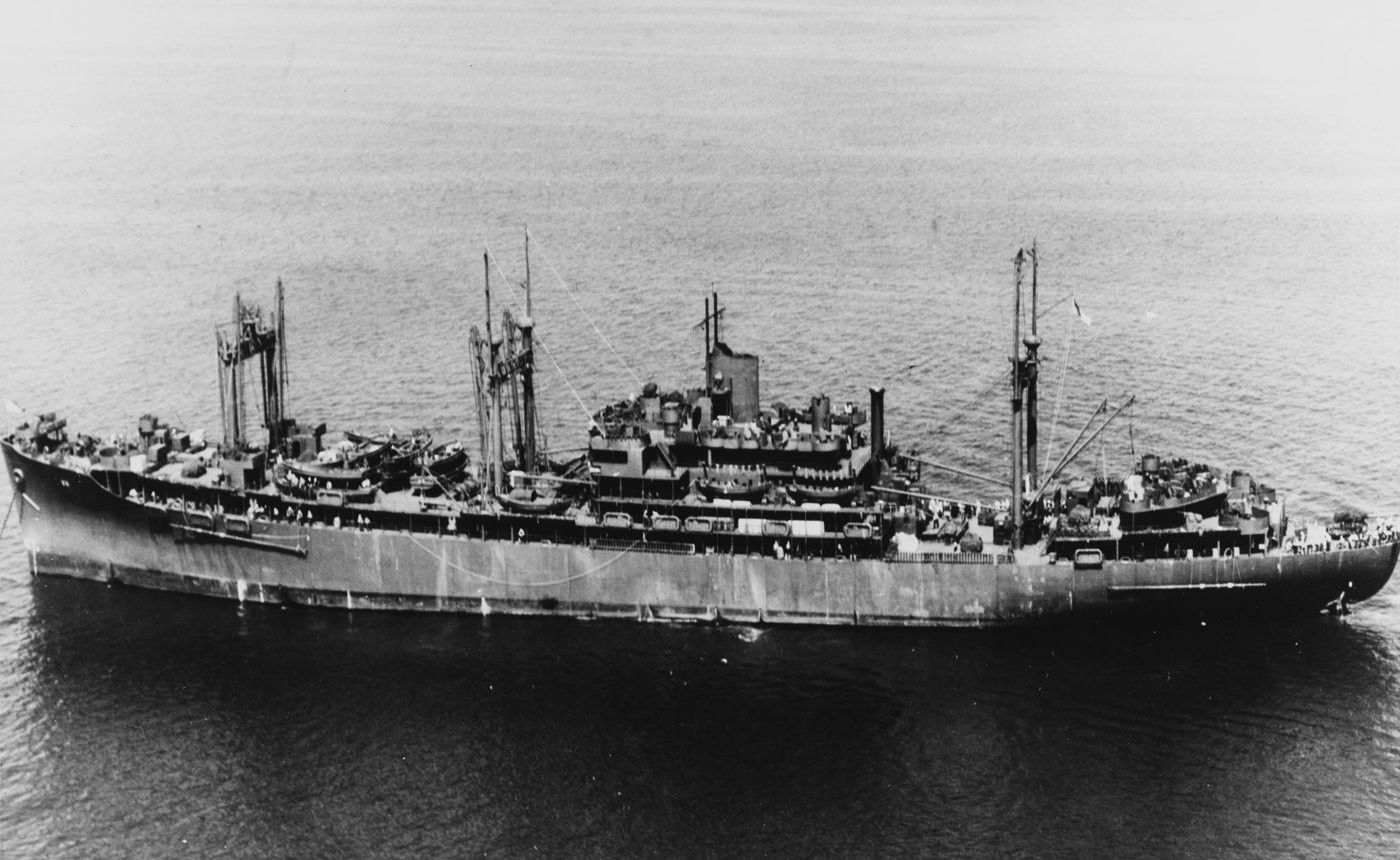
- USS Klondike, in 1945

Class overview
- Operators: United States Navy
- Preceded by: Hamul class
- Succeeded by: Shenandoah class
- Completed: 4
- Retired: 4

General characteristics
- Type: Destroyer tender
- Displacement: 8,165 long tons (8,296 t) Light 11,755 long tons (11,944 t) full load
- Length: 492 ft (150 m)
- Beam: 69 ft (21 m)
- Draft: 27 ft 3 in (8.31 m)
- Propulsion: Geared turbines, 8,500 shp (6,338 kW)
- Speed: 18.4 knots (34.1 km/h; 21.2 mph)
- Complement: 826
- Armament: • 1 × 5 in (127 mm)/38 caliber gun • 4 × 3 in (76 mm)/23 caliber guns • 4 × 40 mm AA guns • 20 × 20 mm guns

The Klondike-class destroyer tender was a class of ships that served the United States Navy from 1945 to 1970.

== History ==
The Klondike-class destroyer tenders were modified United States Maritime Commission Type C3-class ships. All four ships were built at Todd Pacific Shipyards in San Pedro, Los Angeles, California. None of the ships saw service during World War II, and Everglades directly entered the Reserve Fleet. All ships were recommissioned during the Korean War. Klondike was redesignated as a repair ship in 1960.

== Ships in class ==
Name	Number	Builder	Launched	Commissioned	Decommissioned	Status	DANFS	NVR
Klondike	AD-22	Todd, San Pedro	12 August 1944	30 July 1945	15 December 1970	AR-22 1960; sold for scrap 8 May 1975
Arcadia	AD-23	Todd, San Pedro	19 November 1944	13 September 1945	1 July 1973	Sold for scrap 1 August 1974
Everglades	AD-24	Todd, San Pedro	28 January 1945	25 May 1951	15 August 1970	Sold for scrap 4 September 1991
Frontier	AD-25	Todd, San Pedro	25 March 1945	2 March 1946	28 June 1968	Sold for scrap 1 July 1974
