= USS Everglades =

Tender of the United States Navy

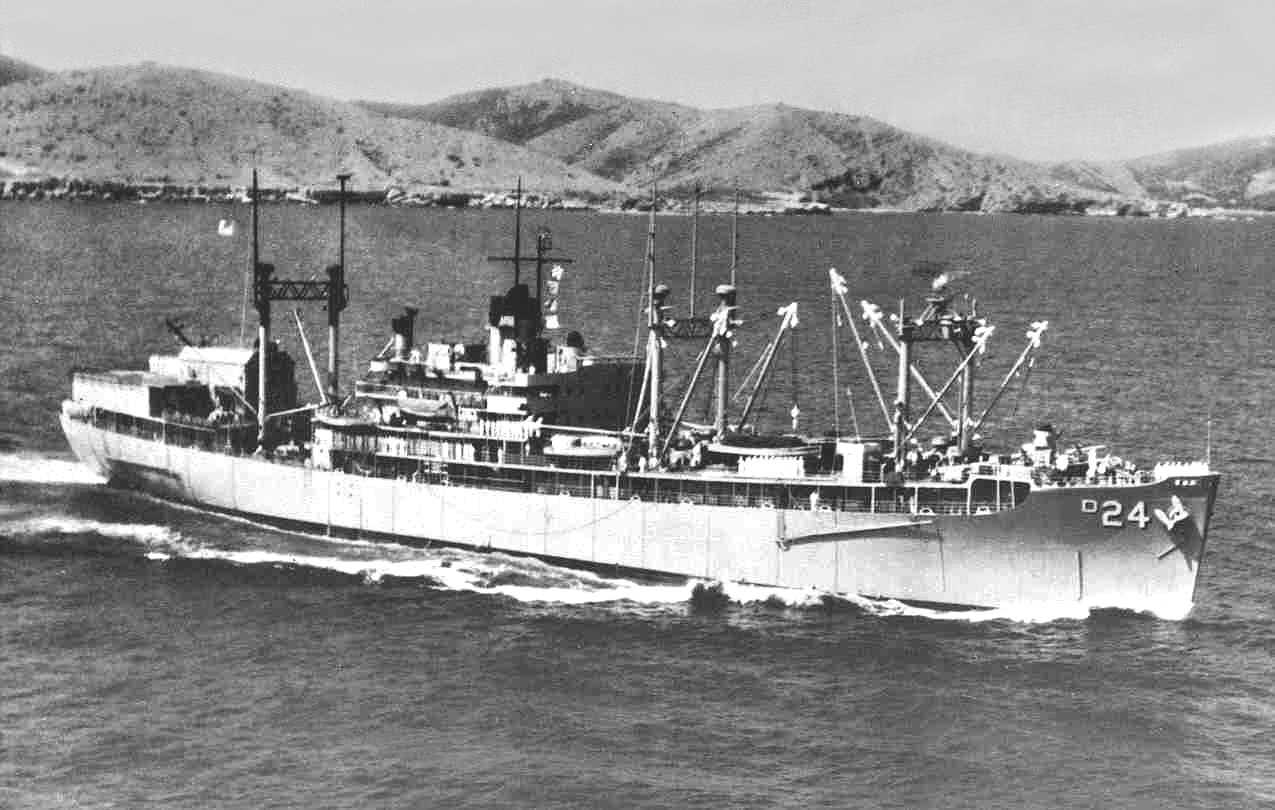
- USS Everglades (AD-24)

History

United States
- Name: USS Everglades
- Namesake: Florida Everglades
- Builder: Los Angeles Shipbuilding and Dry Dock Company, San Pedro, California
- Launched: 28 January 1945
- Commissioned: 25 May 1951
- Decommissioned: 15 August 1970
- Stricken: 24 May 1989
- Fate: Sold for scrapping, 4 September 1991

General characteristics
- Class & type: Klondike-class destroyer tender
- Displacement: 8,165 long tons (8,296 t) light; 11,755 long tons (11,944 t) full
- Length: 492 ft (150 m)
- Beam: 69 ft 8 in (21.23 m)
- Draft: 27 ft 3 in (8.31 m)
- Propulsion: Geared turbines, 8,500 shp (6,338 kW)
- Speed: 18.4 knots (34.1 km/h; 21.2 mph)
- Complement: 826
- Armament: 1 × 5"/38 caliber gun; 4 × 3"/50 caliber guns; 4 × 40 mm AA guns; 20 × 20 mm guns

USS Everglades (AD-24) was one of four Klondike class destroyer tenders built at the tail end of World War II for the United States Navy. The vessel was named for the Florida Everglades.

Everglades was launched on 28 January 1945 by the Los Angeles Shipbuilding and Dry Dock Company, San Pedro, California, sponsored by Mrs. Anne E. Richardson, and completed on 23 May 1946. Never commissioned, she was turned over to the San Diego Group, Pacific Reserve Fleet for inactivation on 15 May 1947. United States embroilment in the Korean War occasioned activation of Everglades, who commissioned for the first time on 25 May 1951.

== Service history ==
Following shakedown and training exercises, Everglades transited the Panama Canal and arrived at Norfolk, Virginia, for duty with Destroyer Force Atlantic. She played a vital part in keeping the Navy ready, repairing Norfolk-based destroyers and servicing ships in the Caribbean or the Mediterranean where she made four extensive cruises through the end of 1960. Everglades removed aircraft wreckage from the Palomares Incident for dumping in the Atlantic.

Everglades was decommissioned in August 1970 at Charleston, S.C.; struck from the Naval Register, 24 May 1989, and laid up at the Naval Inactive Ship Maintenance Facility, Philadelphia where she was used as a support ship. Everglades was transferred to MARAD, 2 July 1990 for lay up in the National Defense Reserve Fleet. Sold, 4 September 1991 to A. L. Burbank Ship Brokers, Ft. Lee, NJ, for scrapping in Alang, India. Removed from Philadelphia Naval Shipyard Reserve Fleet, 14 December 1991. Arrived January 1992.

== See also ==
- List of auxiliaries of the United States Navy
