= USS Frontier =

Tender of the United States Navy

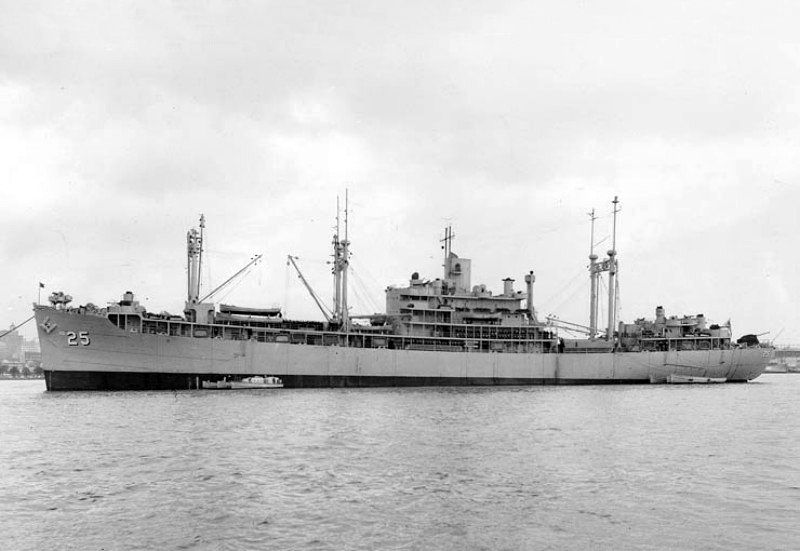
- USS Frontier (AD-25) in 1952

History

United States
- Name: USS Frontier
- Builder: Los Angeles Shipbuilding and Dry Dock Company, San Pedro, California
- Launched: 25 March 1945
- Commissioned: 2 March 1946
- Decommissioned: 28 June 1968
- Stricken: 1 December 1972
- Fate: Sold, 1 July 1974, scrapped April 1975

General characteristics
- Class & type: Klondike-class destroyer tender
- Displacement: 8,165 long tons (8,296 t) light; 11,755 long tons (11,944 t) full
- Length: 492 ft (150 m)
- Beam: 69 ft 8 in (21.23 m)
- Draft: 27 ft 3 in (8.31 m)
- Propulsion: Geared turbines, 8,500 shp (6,338 kW)
- Speed: 18.4 knots (34.1 km/h; 21.2 mph)
- Complement: 826
- Armament: 1 × 5"/38 caliber gun; 4 × 3"/23 caliber guns; 4 × 40 mm AA guns; 20 × 20 mm guns

USS Frontier (AD-25) was one of four Klondike class destroyer tenders built at the tail end of World War II for the United States Navy.

Frontier was launched on 25 March 1945 by the Los Angeles Shipbuilding and Dry Dock Company, San Pedro, California, sponsored by Mrs. George M. Ravenscroft, and commissioned 2 March 1946.

== Service history ==
=== 1946–1947 ===
Following shakedown cruise, Frontier spent the remainder of 1946 servicing various units of the 1st Fleet. Her maiden overseas tour took her to the Far East where she acted with Service Division 32 at Yokosuka from January to May 1947. She underwent inactivation at Long Beach, California and was decommissioned 29 September 1947.

=== 1951–1968 ===
On 11 November 1951 Frontier was recommissioned and fitted out for service with United Nations forces in Korea. She embarked Commander, Destroyer Flotilla 3, on 21 May 1952 at San Diego and thereafter steamed to Yokosuka where she provided services for various units, and logistic support to the 7th Fleet until December. After an overhaul at Puget Sound Naval Shipyard, she weighed anchor for her third overseas tour in the western Pacific. Again she provided tender services for ships of the 7th Fleet, principally at Yokosuka, and acted as flagship of Destroyer Flotilla 3. She returned to Long Beach on 20 December 1953.

During February, 1954 she engaged in Pacific training exercises and maneuvers with TG 12.3. These were followed by refitting at Long Beach and departure for the Far East for a tour which lasted until 7 December 1954 when she sailed for home. Frontier provided services to the various units in the Long Beach area through May 1955. On 19 June she departed for Yokosuka where she embarked Commander, Destroyer Flotilla 3, and performed her vital functions. Another period of overhaul at San Francisco was succeeded by Far Eastern deployment which saw Frontier flagship of Commander Destroyer Flotilla Western Pacific (8 October 1956–25 March 1957). Departing Long Beach on 3 February 1958, she sailed via Pearl Harbor to Melbourne, Australia and numerous other ports of call where she tended units of the fleet.

Frontier again cruised in eastern waters from 16 September 1959 to 1 March 1960. On 15 March 1960 she became flagship of Destroyer Flotilla 3, remaining at Long Beach to provide services until 28 January 1961 when she sailed for Pearl Harbor.

Frontier was decommissioned 28 June 1968 at Naval Station San Diego, California; struck from the Naval Register 1 December 1972, after which time she was transferred to the Maritime Administration for disposal. Frontier was sold by MARAD on 1 July 1974 and scrapped in April 1975.

== See also ==
- List of auxiliaries of the United States Navy
