= USS Samuel Gompers =

Tender of the United States Navy

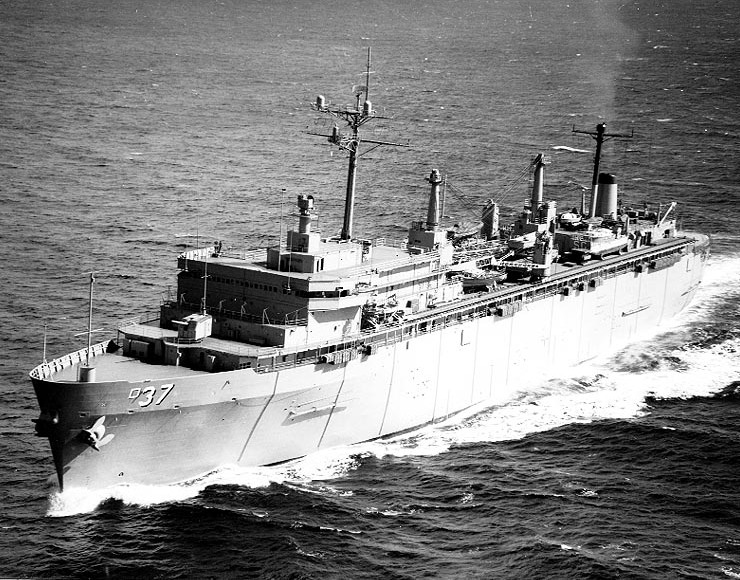
- USS Samuel Gompers

History

United States
- Name: USS Samuel Gompers
- Operator: U.S. Navy
- Awarded: 31 October 1963
- Builder: Puget Sound Naval Shipyard, Bremerton, Washington
- Laid down: 7 September 1964
- Launched: 14 May 1966
- Acquired: 30 September 1967
- Commissioned: 1 July 1967
- Decommissioned: 27 October 1995
- Stricken: 7 April 1999
- Home port: Alameda, California
- Motto: Service Supreme
- Nickname(s): FAT Sam, Sammy G
- Fate: Sunk as target, 22 July 2003

General characteristics
- Class & type: Samuel Gompers-class destroyer tender
- Displacement: 13,458 long tons (13,674 t) light; 20,132 long tons (20,455 t) full load
- Length: 645 ft (197 m)
- Beam: 85 ft (26 m)
- Draft: 22 ft 6 in (6.86 m)
- Propulsion: Steam turbines, 1 shaft
- Speed: 20 knots (37 km/h; 23 mph)
- Complement: 1056 officers and enlisted
- Armament: 2 20 mm cannon 4 0.5 in (12.7 mm) machine guns

USS Samuel Gompers (AD-37) was a destroyer tender, the first of her class, and designed to be a floating repair shop for ships of the U.S. Navy either in port or at sea. The vessel was named for Samuel Gompers, a distinguished American labor leader during the late nineteenth century.

Samuel Gompers was laid down on 9 July 1964 by the Puget Sound Naval Shipyard, Bremerton, Washington and launched on 14 May 1966; sponsored by Mrs. Joseph Holmes. The destroyer tender was commissioned on 1 July 1967.

== Service history ==
=== 1967–1969 ===
After her commissioning, Samuel Gompers spent the next several months in initial outfitting, with acceptance trials taking place from 28 August to 1 September. On 3 October, she got underway for her designated home port, San Diego.

The next month, the destroyer tender underwent various inspections as she was to be deployed to the western Pacific without the benefit of a prior shakedown cruise. This necessitated that a high degree of readiness be attained in a short period of time. All inspections showed that the ship was ready for sea, and she departed San Diego on 10 November for Pearl Harbor.

Following a weapons transfer from Prairie, Samuel Gompers stood out of Pearl Harbor on 20 November bound for Yokosuka, Japan. Upon arriving there on 30 November 1967, she began providing fleet repair support to the operating forces of the Pacific Fleet. In the first month of availability, her repair department accomplished job orders for 54 different ships and other activities.

Samuel Gompers departed Yokosuka for Sasebo on 13 January 1968. Her "in port" period there was originally scheduled on 25 January. However, the capture of USS Pueblo by North Korea brought increased activity by the Pacific Fleet in the Sea of Japan as part of Operation Formation Star. The destroyer tender's services were required to maintain the destroyer screen for the five aircraft carriers then alternating port visits to Sasebo. Seventy-one ships were serviced there before the AD departed.

On 18 March, Samuel Gompers sailed to Kaohsiung, Taiwan, for three weeks. She anchored in mid-stream and serviced 17 ships before departing for Hong Kong, B.C.C.; Subic Bay, Republic of the Philippines; and San Diego. Her first deployment ended on 8 May when she arrived at her home port. One month later, she moved to Bremerton for a period of yard availability. She embarked over 200 dependents to make the voyage up the west coast.

On 27 July, Samuel Gompers stood out of Bremerton, with the dependents aboard, and returned to San Diego. From 30 July to 15 November, she serviced ships there. On 15 November, the tender departed San Diego, with Task Unit (TU) 15.8.2, bound for Subic Bay, via Pearl Harbor and Guam, and her second WestPac deployment. The Task Unit included the destroyers Hopewell, Swenson, Duncan and destroyer leader Coontz. She provided underway replenishment for the accompanying ships three times during the transit, including hi-lining a seaman from Swenson for an emergency operation on Thanksgiving Day, 28 November. From 8 December 1968 to 13 May 1969, she performed fleet repair services in Subic Bay. Capt. Risch was relieved by Captain Claiborne S. Bradley on 3 January 1969. The period was broken by one five-day visit to Hong Kong. On 13 May, the AD sailed to Yokosuka for a short period of rest and recreation, from whence she sailed to the west coast, arriving on 4 June.

=== 1970–1973 ===
Samuel Gompers operated in the San Diego area until 13 March 1970 when she again deployed to the western Pacific, under command of her executive officer, Commander Pete Watson, while Capt. Bradley was on emergency leave. After making a port call at Pearl Harbor, she moored at Subic Bay. Except for five days rest and recreation in Hong Kong in June, with 164 Navy dependents from Subic Bay, the tender operated out of that port until 7 July 1970 when she sailed for Yokosuka, Japan, arriving 10 July. The ship's second change of command took place on 1 August 1970 when Captain Daniel L. Banks relieved Captain Bradley. She departed Japan and arrived in San Diego on 13 September 1970.

She remained there until 2 November 1971 when she steamed west on another deployment. She made port calls in Pearl Harbor and Yokosuka. During her next nine-month deployment period, Samuel Gompers made two trips to Da Nang, South Vietnam, from 9 to 16 April; and from 22 to 30 April. During her deployment she picked up the nickname "FATSAM" for Fast Attack Tender, Samuel Gompers. When she reached her home port on 31 July, she remained there to provide repair services to fleet units until mid-July 1973. At this time, she moved up the coast to Portland, Oregon, entering a dry dock period at Swan Island Shipyard and was in dry dock having significant modifications to service areas far below the waterline. Boiler and fuel system modifications took place at this time. She was converted from burning Navy Bunker C, black oil to Naval Distillate fuel. Flooring in the mess decks and most crew heads was updated. She was reported to be the largest vessel ever to cruise up the Columbia River. A large metal hinge had to be welded to the top few feet of the mast and then the mast was cut and tipped down to allow passage under one of the bridges encountered along her Columbia River passage. Samuel Gompers remained there until returning to San Diego in early December.

In 1972 the ship was deployed to Da Nang Harbor. The ship carried very few large weapons, which left her constantly vulnerable to enemy attack. In that deployment the ship was nicknamed "FAT Sam", a humorous suggestion that she was a "Fast Attack Tender."

=== Female crewmembers ===
In October 1978, while in San Diego, Samuel Gompers took women on board as crew members for the first time; one of the first ships in the fleet to do so. In the next few years, all destroyer tenders, and all non-combative auxiliaries, would have women aboard. Combat ships other than submarines would follow suit beginning in the 1990s.

=== 1984–1988 ===
During WestPac 1984, Samuel Gompers would score another first: it became the first ship to do a major engine changeout while deployed, and not in port. The service was provided to the Spruance-class destroyer Kinkaid while both were anchored together off the coast of Oman in the Indian Ocean. Just a few months after this WestPac ended, the ties with San Diego ended, and Samuel Gompers docked at her new homeport of Alameda, California. The destroyer tender sailed for WESTPAC on 17Jul1986 and returned on 17Jan1987. The destroyer tender deployed on another WESTPAC in January 1988. Samuel Gompers stayed in the Gulf of Oman from March 1988 until late June 1988 supporting Operation Ernest Will and Operation Praying Mantis before returning to her home port.

== Decommissioning and awards ==
On 2 October 1995 Samuel Gompers arrived in Norfolk, Virginia in preparation for decommissioning ceremonies, which took place 27 October. The principal speaker was Rear Admiral James F. Amerault, Commander, Western Hemisphere Group, and a former Samuel Gompers skipper.

The ship had completed 28 years of active service by then, being awarded the Vietnam Service, Southwest Asia, Navy Expeditionary, and Humanitarian Service medals; Navy Unit and Joint Meritorious Unit commendations; Letter of Commendation from the Secretary of the Navy; and five Battle "E" Ribbons.

== Sinking ==
On 22 July 2003, Samuel Gompers was sunk in the Atlantic as part of a fleet training exercise (SINKEX). EX-Samuel Gompers departed Portsmouth at 08:30 on 18 July 2003 under tow of USNS Apache en route to her SINKEX position. Three ships were sent to the bottom of the Atlantic Ocean off the coast of North Carolina: destroyer tender Samuel Gompers, fleet tug Seneca and submarine tender Dixon.

Of the three ships, Samuel Gompers was the last to be sunk, and slipped beneath the waves at 00:06 on 22 July 2003. The first Harpoon missile to strike Samuel Gompers was from the guided-missile destroyer USS Cole, designation Cole 4. Reports indicate it took 16 Harpoon missiles (400 lb (180 kg) each) and over 40,000 pounds (18,000 kg) of ordnance to sink Samuel Gompers. When the Harpoons finished, a squadron of bombers dropped 2,000-pound (910 kg) bombs on her to sink her.

The wreck of Samuel Gompers is reported to lie at 31°17′N 073°51′W.
