= USS Puget Sound (AD-38) =

US Navy ship launched 1964 scrapped 2008

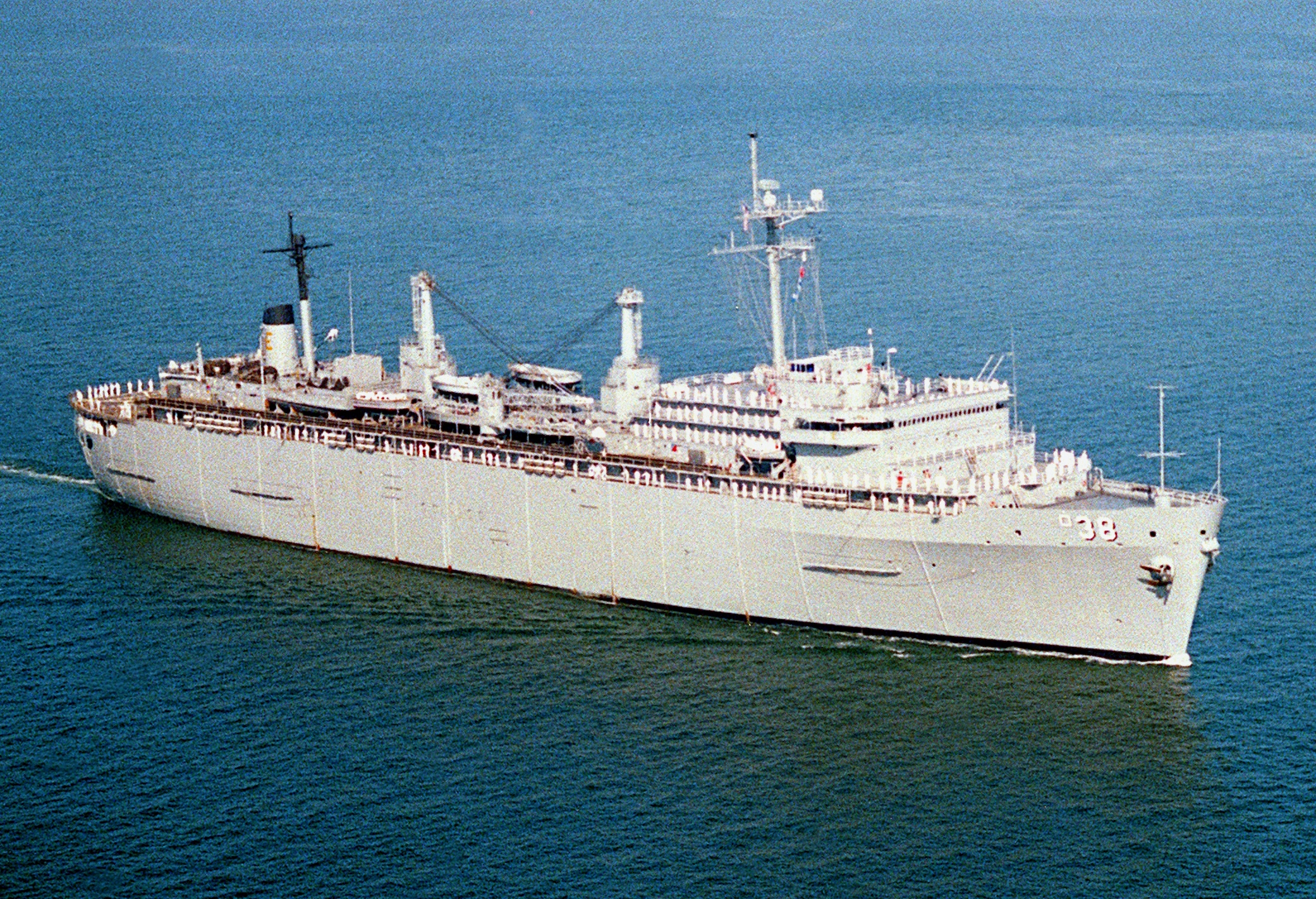
- USS Puget Sound (AD-38)

History

United States
- Name: USS Puget Sound
- Namesake: Puget Sound in Washington
- Awarded: 29 December 1964
- Builder: Puget Sound Naval Shipyard, Bremerton, Washington;
- Laid down: 15 February 1965
- Launched: 16 September 1966
- Commissioned: 27 April 1968
- Decommissioned: 27 January 1996
- Motto: Standard For Excellence
- Fate: Scrapped 2008
- Badge

General characteristics
- Class & type: Samuel Gompers-class destroyer tender
- Displacement: 20,500 long tons (20,829 t); 6,674 long tons (6,781 t) dwt
- Length: 643 ft 1 in (196.01 m)
- Beam: 85 ft (26 m)
- Draft: 35 ft (11 m)
- Propulsion: Two boilers (600 psi), geared turbines; one screw; 20,000 shp (14,914 kW)
- Speed: 21.7 knots (40.2 km/h; 25.0 mph)
- Complement: 106 officers, 1,314 enlisted
- Armament: 1 × single 5"/38 caliber gun (removed 1979); 2 x Mark 16, Mod 5 20 mm cannon; 4 x .50 cal (12.7 mm) caliber machine guns
- Aircraft carried: 1 × SH-3 Sea King helicopter

USS Puget Sound (AD-38) was a Samuel Gompers-class destroyer tender, the second ship of the United States Navy to bear the name Puget Sound.

The building contract was awarded 29 December 1964 to Puget Sound Naval Shipyard in Bremerton, Washington. The keel was laid 15 February 1965, and she was launched 16 September 1966. Commissioned 27 April 1968, she served almost 29 years until decommissioned on 27 January 1996. She was berthed at Naval Inactive Ship Maintenance Facility (NISMF) Philadelphia, Pennsylvania until April 2008 at which time she was sold to ESCO Marine, Brownsville, Texas for recycling and transferred under tow to that facility. The scrapping project was completed in February, 2009.

== Service history ==
Puget Sound was designated to perform repairs and maintenance of the U.S. Navy's shore and seagoing equipment. Serving in the Atlantic Fleet for her life span, she was homeported in Newport, Rhode Island; Gaeta, Italy; and Norfolk, Virginia. She served a portion of her life as the flagship for the admiral in charge of the Sixth Fleet while homeported in Gaeta. She served during several conflicts, including the latter portion of the Vietnam War and the crisis in Lebanon; in October 1983 she was fired upon by short range, shoulder launched rockets (RPG) by on-shore terrorists while tending ships at anchor off the coast of Beirut. The USS Puget Sound also participated in Operation Prime Chance, Operation Desert Storm, Operation Desert Shield, transported Kurdish refugees in Operation Provide Comfort, and participated in Operation Restore Hope. Instrumental to keeping the Atlantic Fleet afloat and mobile, she has repaired and resupplied most ships stationed or serving in the Atlantic Ocean, Mediterranean Sea, Red Sea, and Persian Gulf. Additionally, she could carry and support one SH-3 Sea King helicopter (or similar size aircraft) from her flight deck and hangar and did so during her years as 6th Fleet Flagship in Gaeta, Italy.

== Capabilities ==
With a complete repair department on board, she could repair any surface ship that did not need a dry dock for hull repairs. Capabilities included a large machine shop, foundry, electrical and motor rewind shop, nuclear systems repair, and many diverse systems repair shops. A dive shop allowed for underwater repairs to be made, however such repairs were limited. Outfitted with two stationary center-mast main cranes, she could move heavy equipment to and from other ships or docks to be repaired and then reinstalled. Two smaller traveling cranes could move up and down each side of the aft portion of the ship's upper deck, which allowed equipment to be moved virtually anywhere needed.

AD-38 also had a full supply department that could provide any tended ships along with stores, such as food and drink, ammunition, fuel, water, and medical/dental services. Her administration department could serve as a floating Personnel Support Detachment (PSD) and a disbursing center for payroll. Her ship's store also served many personnel, both tended by and stationed aboard her, with personal items such as grooming supplies, snack foods, tobacco products, books, uniform articles, and more.

All offensive armament was removed from the ship in 1979 as part of the modifications to allow women to serve in the ship's crew. U.S. law at the time did not allow women to serve on combatant ships.

== Hull markings ==
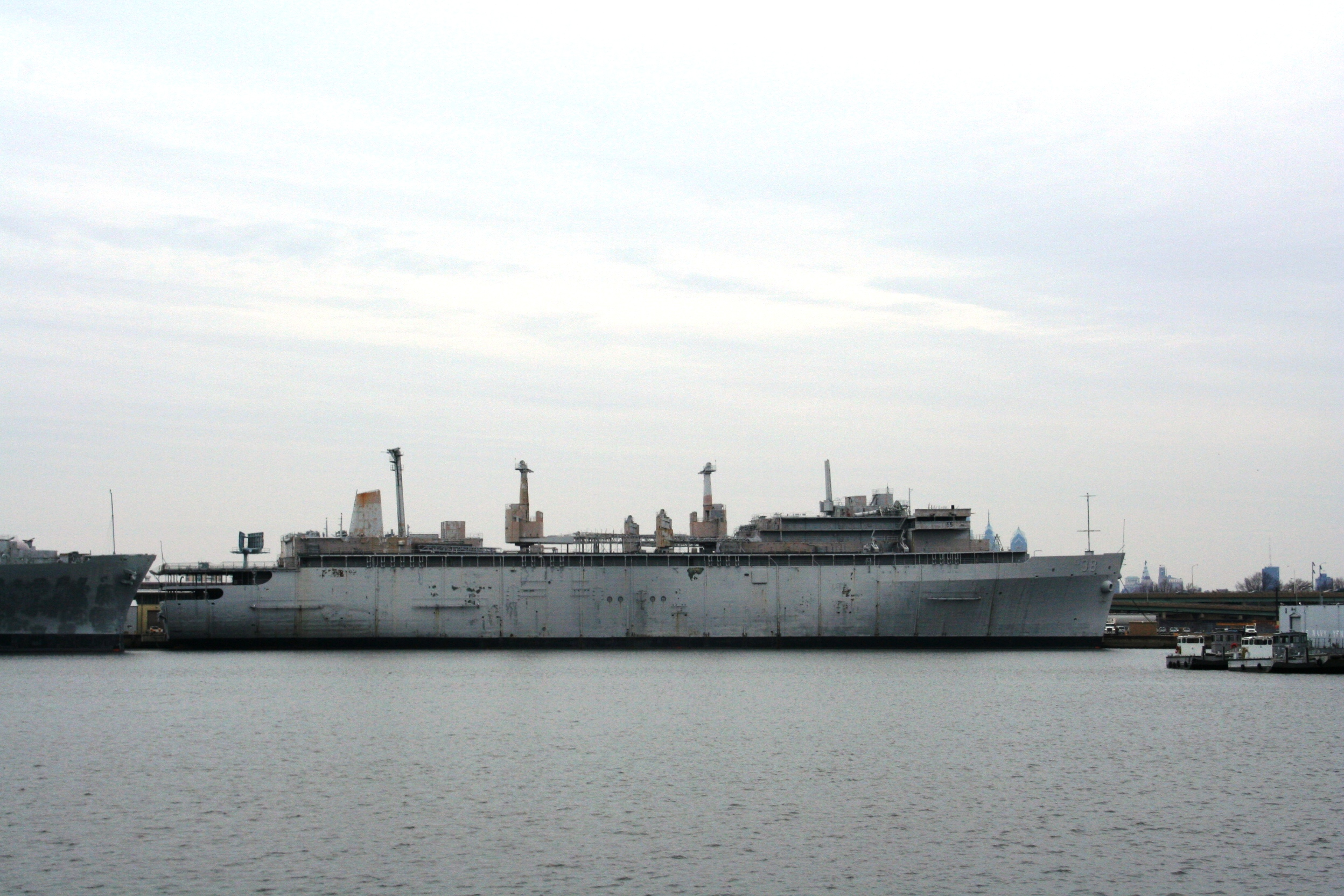
The USS Puget Sound at Philadelphia Naval Inactive Ship Maintenance Facility, January 2008

Displayed prominently on both sides of her bow, the Puget Sound bore a large white "D" followed by the numbers "38". As with most ships in the US Navy, the first letter of the ship's hull number was dropped when painted on the side of the bow.

In the Puget Sound's hull number "AD-38", the 'A' stands for 'Auxiliary'. She was not a fighting ship, rather a support ship. The 'D' stands for 'destroyer tender', as opposed to submarine tenders (AS). Finally, the "38" is her designation number separating her from other ships that are of the same type.

Painted across the stern on the third deck fantail, or the rear portion of the ship on the deck lowest to the water, was her name Puget Sound.
