= USS Shenandoah =

Four United States Navy ships, including one rigid airship, and one ship of the Confederate States of America, have been named Shenandoah, after the Shenandoah River of western Virginia and West Virginia.

- USS Shenandoah (1862), a screw sloop commissioned in 1863, active in the American Civil War and in use until 1886
- USS Shenandoah (ZR-1), the first rigid airship built by the Navy, christened 1923; destroyed in a storm in 1925
- USS Shenandoah (AD-26), a destroyer tender in service from 1945 to 1980
- USS Shenandoah (AD-44), a destroyer tender, commissioned 1983 and decommissioned 1996
- USNS Shenandoah (T-AO-181), an oiler laid down in 1964, renamed USNS Potomac (T-AO-181) prior to completion

== See also ==
- CSS Shenandoah, a screw steamer
- USS Skenandoa, tugboats
