= USS Seneca (AT-91) =

Tugboat of the United States Navy

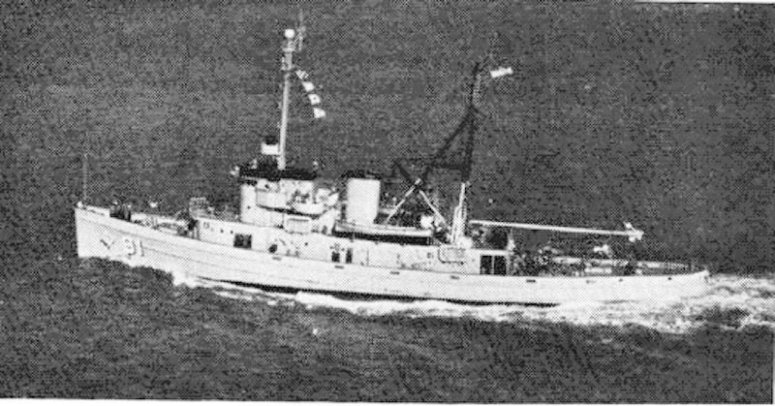

History

United States
- Name: USS Seneca
- Builder: Cramp Shipbuilding Co., Philadelphia
- Yard number: 546
- Laid down: 7 September 1942
- Launched: 2 February 1943
- Commissioned: 30 April 1943
- Decommissioned: July 1971
- Reclassified: ATF-91, 15 May 1944
- Stricken: 30 October 1985
- Fate: Disposed of as a target, 21 July 2003
- Notes: Served as floating laboratory space at the Annapolis, Maryland, site of the Carderock Division of the Naval Surface Warfare Center.

General characteristics
- Class & type: Navajo-class fleet tug
- Displacement: 1,235 long tons (1,255 t)
- Length: 205 ft (62 m)
- Beam: 38 ft 6 in (11.73 m)
- Draft: 15 ft 4 in (4.67 m)
- Propulsion: Diesel-electric; four General Motors 12-278A diesel main engines driving four General Electric generators and three General Motors 3-268A auxiliary services engines; single screw; 3,600 shp (2,685 kW)
- Speed: 16 knots (30 km/h; 18 mph)
- Complement: 85
- Armament: 1 × 3 in (76 mm) gun; 2 × twin 40 mm gun mounts; 2 × single 20 mm guns

USS Seneca (AT-91) was a Navajo-class fleet tug constructed for the United States Navy during World War II. Her purpose was to aid ships, usually by towing, on the high seas or in combat or post-combat areas, plus "other duties as assigned." She served in the Atlantic Ocean performing various tasks.

Seneca was laid down at Philadelphia on 7 September 1942 by the Cramp Shipbuilding Co. and launched on 2 February 1943. The vessel was commissioned at the Philadelphia Navy Yard on 30 April 1943.

== World War II North Atlantic operations ==
The tug completed fitting out and post-commissioning availability on 19 May and departed for trials, drills, and calibrations in the Delaware Bay. Three days later, she cleared the Delaware Capes and arrived at Norfolk, Virginia, for shakedown training. Seneca next stood out of Norfolk on 18 June, towing a target raft to Guantanamo Bay, Cuba. From 27 June until 7 July, she conducted anti-submarine warfare (ASW) training in the Guantanamo Bay operating area; then she headed for Trinidad to begin a tour of duty with the U.S. 4th Fleet.

== Rescuing German U-boat survivors ==
For the next 21 months, Seneca was assigned target towing, general rescue, and salvage duties in the waters off the coast of Brazil. During one of her early rescue missions, Seneca captured two survivors of a German U-boat sunk by Allied ASW patrols.

Seneca was re-designated ATF-91 on 15 May 1944. On 9 April 1945, she departed Bermuda for Norfolk with a dual tow. Upon arrival, she entered the Norfolk Navy Yard for overhaul. On 25 May 1945, she cleared Norfolk for a tour of duty at Port Everglades, Florida, and Key West, Florida, with the Surface Group of the Anti-submarine Development Detachment. She towed targets and recovered torpedoes until her departure from Key West on 19 February 1946. Seneca towed a large floating crane to Philadelphia, arrived on the 26th, and later shifted to Norfolk for overhaul.

== Post-war operations ==
Following overhaul, Seneca commenced 25 years of operations out of Norfolk and Little Creek, Virginia. Her routine during this time consisted of target towing, rescue and salvage work, and ship towing; most often these were reserve ships moving from one berthing area to another or former Navy ships to be sunk as targets. Her sphere of operations consisted of the Atlantic seaboard, the Caribbean, and the Gulf of Mexico. She spent much of her career in the Guantanamo Bay area and in the British West Indies, but also frequented the New England, Canadian, and Greenland coasts. On one occasion, she even made a tow to Reykjavík, Iceland.

Between 1946 and 1971, Seneca only ventured out of the western Atlantic three times. On 1 May 1961, she departed Mayport, Florida, with AFBD-7 in tow and made Holy Loch, Scotland, a month later. Leaving her charge at Holy Loch, Seneca sailed to Penzance, England, on 5 June. She stood out of Penzance on 13 June and arrived in Norfolk, Virginia, on 24 June. In the summer of 1964, she participated in the tow of Oak Ridge and YFNB-36 from Norfolk to Rota, Spain. She sailed to the Mediterranean in 1966 for a five-month deployment with the U.S. 6th Fleet after which she resumed her normal routine in the western Atlantic. Three of her more important evolutions before decommissioning were the tows of the Aircraft Carriers Essex and Randolph from the Boston Army Piers in Boston to the Brooklyn Navy Yard and tows of WW II Vessels from the Hudson River Reserve Fleet in the ongoing effort to clean up the Hudson encouraged by President Nixon.<Former Operations Officer>

== Decommissioning ==
Decommissioned in July 1971, Seneca was transferred to the Maritime Administration on 18 November 1971 for lay up with the James River Group, National Defense Reserve Fleet, Fort Eustis, Virginia. She was struck from the Naval Vessel Register on 30 October 1985. In the late 1980s, the ship was modified at the United States Coast Guard Yard for use as floating laboratory space. The ship was moored at the former Engineering Experiment Station in Annapolis, Maryland, later part of the Carderock Division of the Naval Surface Warfare Center. She continued to serve in this capacity until 18 June 1997, when she was towed to Portsmouth, Virginia. She was finally sunk as a target along with the submarine tender Dixon and the destroyer tender Samuel Gompers in the Atlantic Ocean off North Carolina on 21 July 2003.
