= Yellowstone-class destroyer tender =

Class of United States Navy destroyer tenders

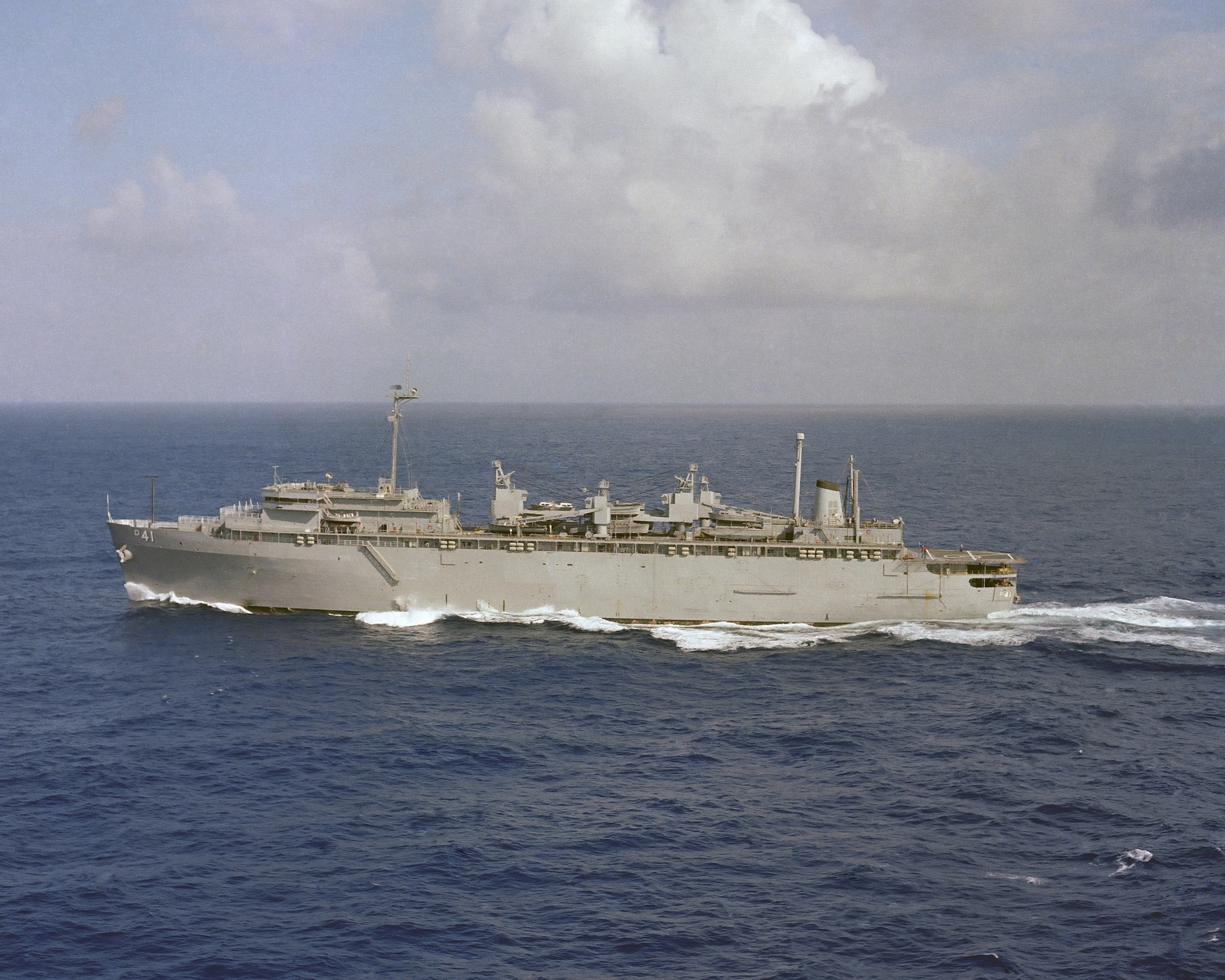

Class overview
- Name: Yellowstone-class destroyer tender
- Builders: National Steel and Shipbuilding Company
- Operators: United States Navy
- Preceded by: Samuel Gompers class
- Built: 1977–1982
- In commission: 1980–1996
- Planned: 5
- Completed: 4
- Retired: 4

General characteristics
- Type: Destroyer tender
- Displacement: 20,263 tons
- Length: 642 ft (196 m)
- Beam: 85 ft (26 m)
- Draft: 27 ft (8.2 m)
- Propulsion: Steam turbines
- Speed: 20 knots (37 km/h; 23 mph)
- Complement: 87 officers, 1,508 enlisted
- Armament: 6 × .50-caliber machine guns; 2 × 20 mm cannons; 2 × 40 mm grenade launchers

The Yellowstone class was a class of four destroyer tenders in service with the United States Navy from 1980 to 1996.

== History ==
The Yellowstone class was a repetition of the preceding Samuel Gompers class, so that sometimes all ships are put in one class. All ships were commissioned in 1980 to 1983 to replace the aging Dixie class. However, the end of the Cold War in 1990 led to the retirement of the Yellowstone class after only 13 to 16 years of service. After spending about another 15 years in the Reserve Fleet, three ships were scrapped and one was sunk as a target.

== Ships ==
Name	Number	Builder	Launched	Commissioned	Decommissioned	Status	NVR
Yellowstone	AD-41	National Steel and Shipbuilding Company	27 January 1979	28 June 1980	31 January 1996	Sold for scrap 17 December 2014
Acadia	AD-42	National Steel and Shipbuilding Company	28 July 1979	6 June 1981	16 December 1994	Sunk as target 20 September 2010
Cape Cod	AD-43	National Steel and Shipbuilding Company	2 August 1980	17 April 1982	29 September 1995	Sold for scrap 16 February 2012
Shenandoah	AD-44	National Steel and Shipbuilding Company	6 February 1982	15 August 1983	3 September 1996	Sold for scrap 20 November 2014
	AD-45					Planned, never built
