= Hamul-class destroyer tender =

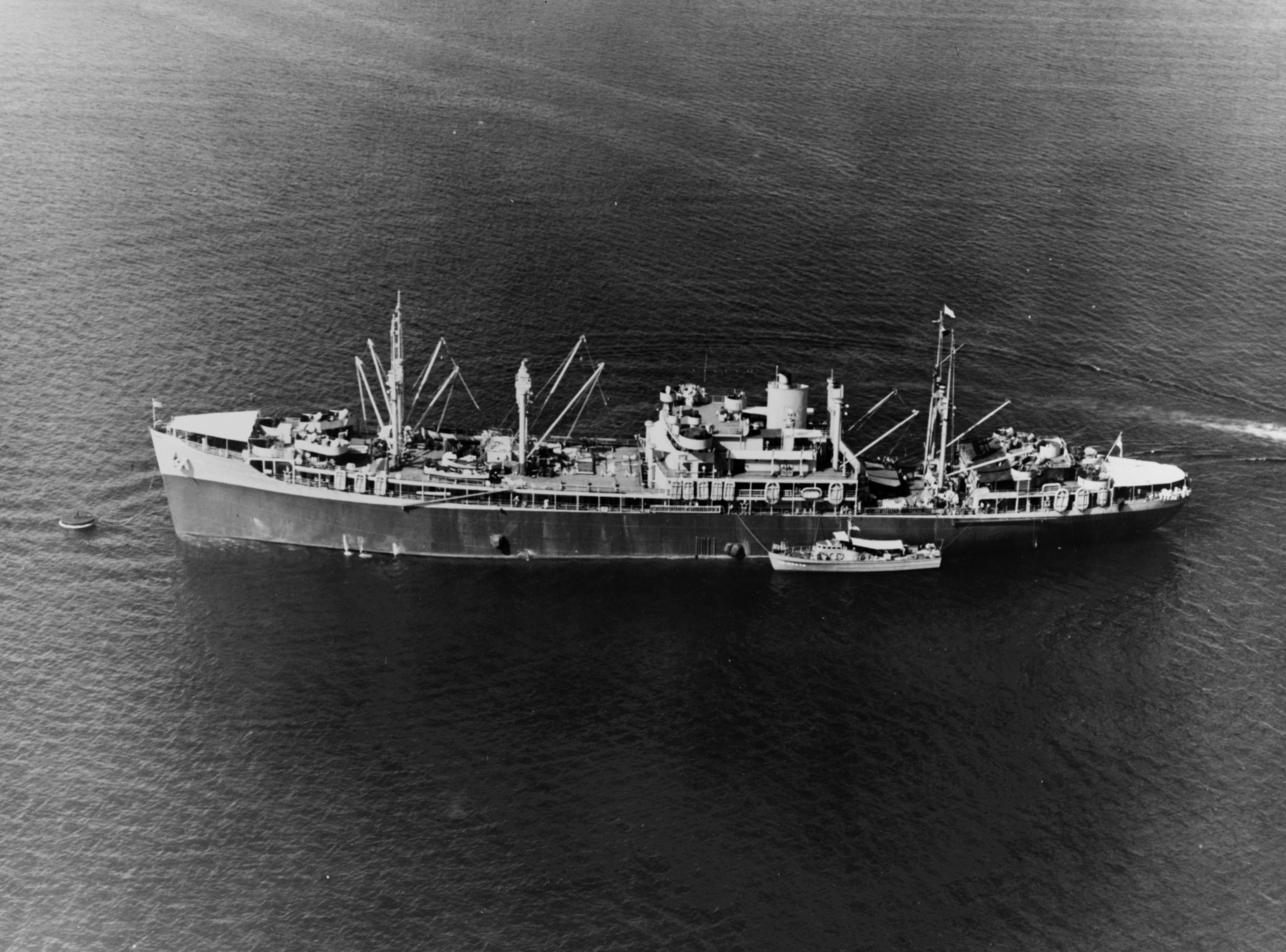
- Hamul at anchor in Great Sound, Bermuda, on 15 July 1944

Class overview
- Name: Hamul class
- Operators: United States Navy
- Preceded by: Dixie class
- Succeeded by: Klondike class
- Completed: 2
- Retired: 2

General characteristics
- Type: Destroyer tender
- Displacement: 8,560 long tons (8,700 t) light; 14,800 long tons (15,000 t) full load
- Length: 492 ft 5 in (150.09 m) oa
- Beam: 69 ft 8 in (21.23 m)
- Draft: 28 ft 6 in (8.69 m)
- Propulsion: Geared turbines, 8,500 shp (6,300 kW), single propeller
- Speed: 18.4 knots (34.1 km/h; 21.2 mph)
- Complement: 857
- Armament: 1 × 5 in (127 mm) gun; 4 × 3 in (76 mm) guns; 4 × 1.6 in (40 mm) guns

The Hamul class were a class of destroyer tenders that were initially constructed as attack cargo ships for the United States Navy during World War II. They operated from 1941 to 1969.

== Design and description ==
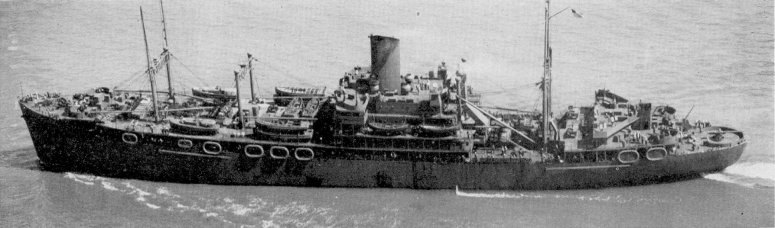
Markab underway on 7 October 1942

Initially both ships were commercial cargo ships of the C3 type taken over by the United States Navy during World War II and converted to attack cargo ships. The ships measured 465 feet (142 m) long between perpendiculars and 492 ft 5 in (150.09 m) overall with a beam of 69 ft 8 in (21.23 m) and a draft of 28 ft 6 in (8.69 m). As attack cargo ships, they had a displacement of 11,755 long tons (11,944 t). After their conversion to destroyer tenders, they had a light displacement of 8,860 long tons (9,000 t) and measured 14,800 long tons (15,000 t) at full load. They were powered by steam generated from two Foster Wheeler boilers turning geared turbines creating 8,500 shaft horsepower (6,300 kW). This gave them a maximum speed of 18.4 knots (34.1 km/h; 21.2 mph). The ships were armed with a single 5-inch (127 mm)/38-caliber gun, four single-mounted 3 in (76 mm)/50 cal. guns and four 1.6 in (40 mm) guns. (Note: The 50 and 38 calibers denote the length of the guns. This means that the length of the gun barrel is 50 and 38 times the bore diameter respectively.) They had a complement of 857 officers and enlisted personnel.

== Ships in class ==
Hamul class construction data
Hull number	Name	Builder	Launched	Acquired by US Navy	Commissioned	Fate
AK-30/AD-20	Hamul (ex-Doctor Lykes)	Federal Shipbuilding and Drydock Company, Kearny, New Jersey	6 April 1940	5 June 1941	15 June 1941	Broken up for scrap 1975
AK-31/AD-21/AR-23	Markab (ex-Mormacpenn)	Ingalls Shipbuilding, Pascagoula, Mississippi	21 December 1940	2 June 1941	15 June 1941	Broken up for scrap 1977
