= USS Skenandoa =

USS Skenandoa has been the name of more than one United States Navy ship, and may refer to:

- USS Skenandoa (YT-336), later YTM-336, a harbor tug in service from 1943 to 1946
- Skenandoa (YTB-835), a harbor tug in service since 1975

== See also ==
- USS Shenandoah
