= USS Shenandoah (AD-44) =

Tender of the United States Navy

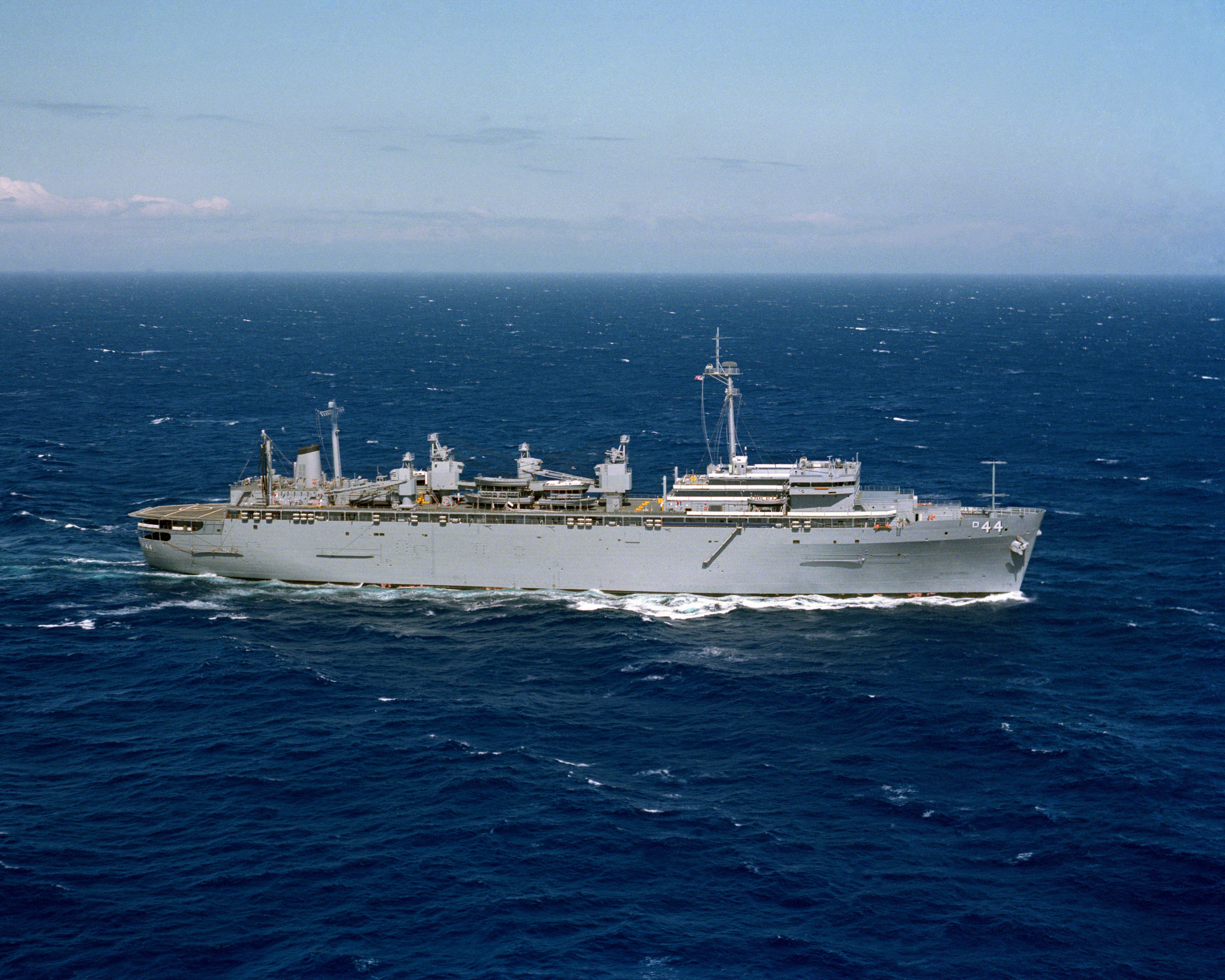

History

United States
- Builder: National Steel and Shipbuilding Company
- Laid down: 2 August 1980
- Launched: 6 February 1982
- Commissioned: 15 August 1983
- Decommissioned: 3 September 1996
- Stricken: 28 July 2001
- Fate: Scrapped in 2012

General characteristics
- Class & type: Yellowstone-class destroyer tender
- Displacement: 20263 tons
- Length: 642 ft (196 m)
- Beam: 85 ft (26 m)
- Draft: 27 ft (8.2 m)
- Propulsion: steam turbines, 20,000 shaft horsepower
- Speed: 20 knots
- Complement: 87 Officers 1508 Enlisted
- Armament: 2 20mm cannon, 4 .50 caliber machine guns

USS Shenandoah (AD-44) was the fourth and final ship of the Yellowstone-class of destroyer tenders. AD-44 was the fifth ship to bear the name, USS Shenandoah as named for the Shenandoah Valley. She was commissioned in 1983, only three years after the decommissioning of the previous USS Shenandoah (AD-26), also a destroyer tender.

In 1993, USS Shenandoah was unexpectedly diverted to the Persian Gulf to tend ships of the U.S. Seventh Fleet's USS Abraham Lincoln (CVN-72) Battle Group. This was documented in the Shenandoah's Tenth Anniversary cruise book. The Shenandoah and her crew members were awarded the Southwest Asia Service Medal with one campaign star and the Kuwait Liberation Medal (Kuwait).

Following her decommissioning in 1996, at only 13 years old, the USS Shenandoah was re-located at the James River Reserve Fleet in Fort Eustis, Va., awaiting final disposal. In FY15, the ex-Shenandoah was sold for dismantlement, departed the JRRF and was withdrawn from MARAD inventory.

== Awards and decorations ==
The USS Shenandoah received the following unit awards in its history:

Navy Meritorious Unit Commendation w/ 4 service stars	Navy E Ribbon w/ 3 Battle E devices	National Defense Service Medal
Southwest Asia Service Medal w/ 1 campaign star	Navy Sea Service Deployment Ribbon w/ 7 service stars	Kuwait Liberation Medal (Kuwait)

- Navy Meritorious Unit Commendation
  - 1 May 1987 to 1 September 1988
  - 12 June 1989 to 31 October 1989
  - 1 June 1991 to 12 December 1991
  - 15 April 1993 to 4 October 1993
  - 21 November 1994 to 13 September 1996
- Navy Battle "E" Award
  - 1 April 1985 to 30 September 1986
  - 1 October 1986 to 31 March 1988
  - 1 January 1995 to 31 December 1995
- National Defense Service Medal
  - 2 August 1990 to 30 November 1995; for service during the Gulf War
- Southwest Asia Service Medal
  - 10 July 1991 to 10 August 1991; campaign star: (Cease-Fire Campaign)
- Sea Service Deployment Ribbon
  - Multiple deployments
- Kuwait Liberation Medal (Kuwait)
  - 10 July 1991 to 10 August 1991
