= USS Cape Cod =

Tender of the United States Navy

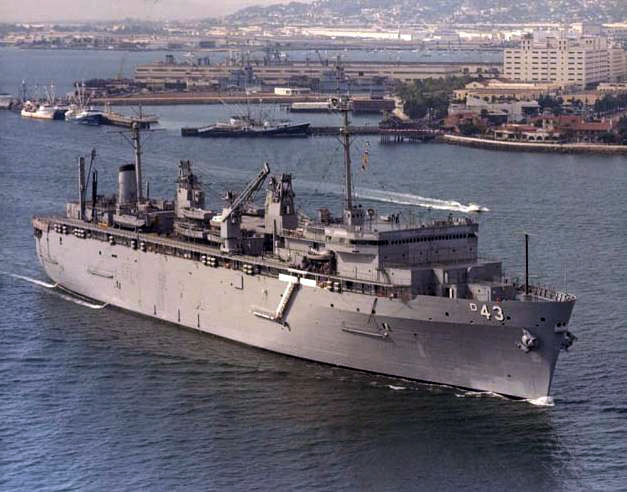

History

United States
- Name: USS Cape Cod
- Namesake: Cape Cod, Massachusetts
- Ordered: 30 September 1977
- Builder: National Steel and Shipbuilding Co., San Diego, California
- Laid down: 27 January 1979
- Launched: 2 August 1980
- Acquired: 15 February 1982
- Commissioned: 17 April 1982
- Decommissioned: 29 September 1995
- Stricken: 7 April 1999
- Honours and awards: Joint Meritorious Unit Award, Navy Unit Commendation, Navy Battle "E" Ribbon (3), National Defense Service Medal, Armed Forces Expeditionary Medal (2-Persian Gulf), Southwest Asia Service Medal, Kuwait Liberation Medal
- Fate: Scrapped at ESCO Marine, 2012

General characteristics
- Class & type: Yellowstone-class destroyer tender
- Displacement: Approx. 20,500 tons full load
- Length: 643 feet (196 meters)
- Beam: 85 feet (26 meters)
- Draft: 27 feet (8.2 meters)
- Propulsion: Two boilers, steam turbines, one shaft, 20,000 shaft horsepower
- Speed: 20 knots
- Complement: 1500
- Armament: One single 5 in (130 mm)/38 dual purpose gun mount
- Armor: None
- Aircraft carried: Helicopter platform

USS Cape Cod (AD-43) was the third Yellowstone-class destroyer tender in the United States Navy.

== History ==
Cape Cod was laid down on 27 January 1979 at San Diego, California, by the National Steel and Shipbuilding Company and launched on 2 August 1980. The destroyer tender worked for many years in active naval service. It assisted the Spruance-class destroyers, the Truxtun-class cruisers and Oliver Hazard Perry-class frigates.

She was commissioned on 17 April 1982 and served 13 years as a destroyer tender before being decommissioned on 29 September 1995, and stricken from the Navy list on 7 April 1999. She was berthed at the James River Reserve Fleet in Fort Eustis, VA, until she was sold for scrap in 2012.

== See also ==
- USS Barnstable County (LST-1197)
- SS Cape Cod (T-AK-5041)
