= USS Acadia =

Tender of the United States Navy

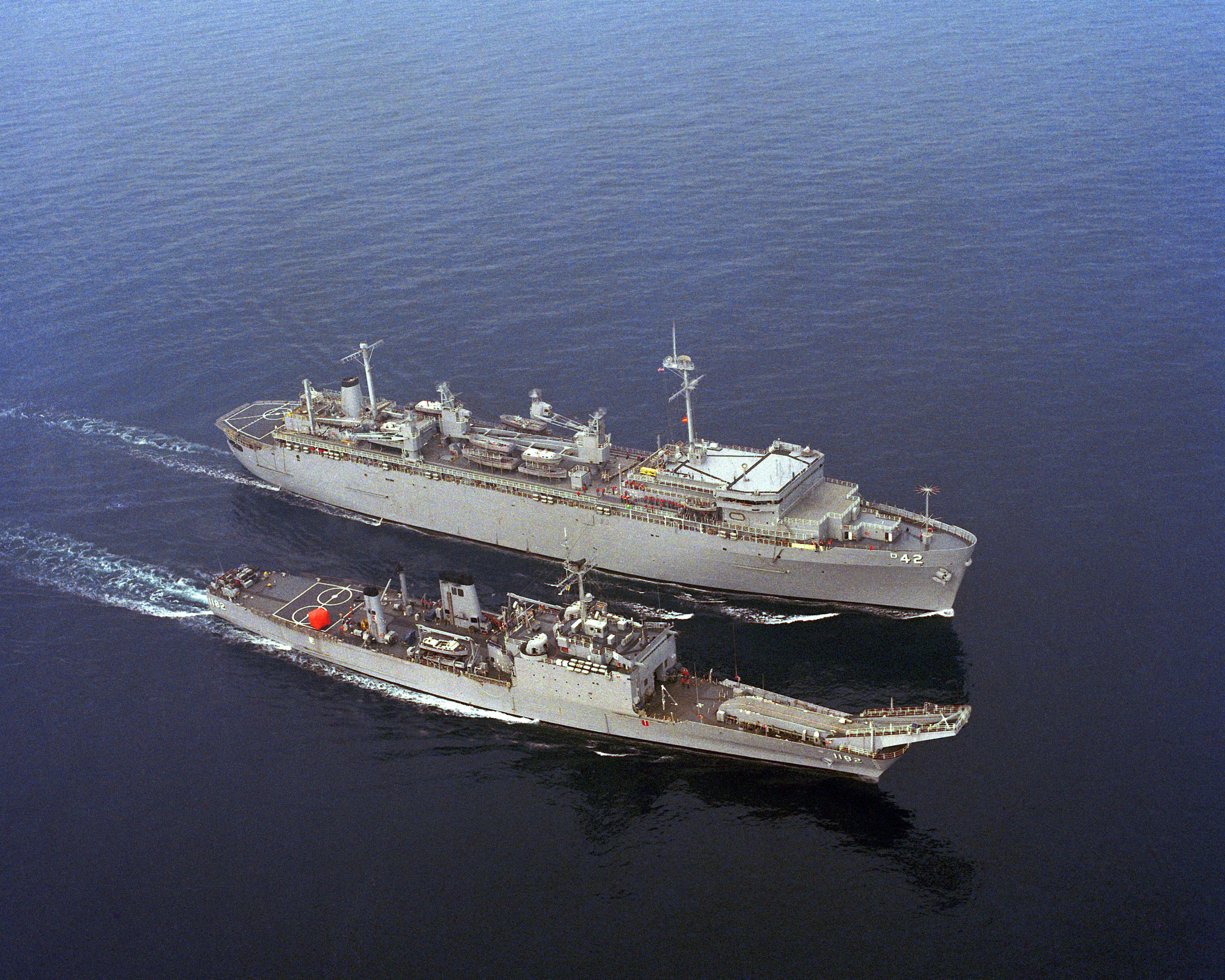
- Acadia (top) and USS Fresno in 1982

History

United States
- Name: USS Acadia
- Ordered: 11 March 1976
- Builder: National Steel and Shipbuilding Company, San Diego
- Laid down: 14 February 1978
- Launched: 28 July 1979
- Commissioned: 6 June 1981
- Decommissioned: 16 December 1994
- Stricken: 13 December 2007
- Fate: Sunk as target 20 September 2010

General characteristics
- Class & type: Yellowstone-class destroyer tender
- Displacement: 21,916 long tons (22,268 t)
- Length: 641 ft 10 in (195.63 m)
- Beam: 85 ft (26 m)
- Draft: 24 ft (7.3 m)
- Propulsion: 2 boilers, steam turbines, single shaft, 20,000 shp (14,914 kW)
- Speed: 20 knots (37 km/h; 23 mph)
- Complement: 87 officers; 1,508 enlisted
- Armament: 2 × 20 mm cannon; 4 × 0.5 in (12.7 mm). machine guns; 2 × 40 mm grenade launchers
- Aviation facilities: Helicopter deck/platform and hangar aft; Enabling "fly-away" repair team support, as well as resupply and emergency airlifts.

Acadia (AD-42) was a Yellowstone-class destroyer tender in the service of the United States Navy, named after Acadia National Park. She was inactive and in reserve after her 1994 decommissioning at Naval Inactive Ship Maintenance Facility (NISMF), Pearl Harbor, Hawaii, under maintenance category B, until sunk off Guam during a live-fire training exercise (Valiant Shield) on 20 September 2010.

== Construction and commissioning ==
Acadia was ordered on 11 March 1976, laid down on 14 February 1978 at San Diego, California, by National Steel and Shipbuilding Company, launched on 28 July 1979, sponsored by Mrs. Clarence R. Bryan, wife of Vice Admiral Clarence R. Bryan, and commissioned on 6 June 1981.

== Service history ==
=== 1981–1987 ===
Acadia completed her outfitting at her builder's yard on 6 July and then made the brief trip to Naval Station San Diego. After a month clearing details and getting ready, the destroyer tender embarked upon her shakedown cruise on 7 August. That voyage took her to Pearl Harbor, Hawaii, and back to San Diego where she arrived on 28 August. When the ship returned to her home port, her crew concentrated their efforts on honing their skills as repairmen; and, except for a few brief periods at sea for underway training and propulsion plant certification, Acadia spent the rest of the year in port at San Diego.

The destroyer tender began 1982 as a fully operational mobile repair facility of the Pacific Fleet. She provided her services at San Diego until the beginning of February when she moved to the Naval Air Station, Alameda. At the end of the month, she steamed back to San Diego. Late in May, the ship embarked Naval Academy and NROTC midshipmen for their summer training cruise. On 14 June, Acadia stood out of San Diego on her way to Hawaii. The destroyer tender repaired ships of the Pacific Fleet at Pearl Harbor from 22 June to 25 July. Returning to San Diego in August, she spent the remainder of the year in the immediate vicinity of her home port. Though she put to sea occasionally for training purposes, the majority of the time, she was in San Diego doing repair work for the fleet.

In December 1982, Acadia began preparations for the first overseas assignment of her career. On 4 January 1983, the destroyer tender put to sea for a journey to the Orient, the Indian Ocean and the east coast of Africa. Acadia stopped at Pearl Harbor between 12 and 14 January and, after another ten days at sea, arrived in Yokosuka, Japan, on 24 January. Acadia remained at Yokosuka for almost a month then visited Sasebo before setting a course for the Philippines on 23 February. The ship entered Subic Bay, Luzon on 27 February and performed repairs until 3 March when she put to sea for duty in the Indian Ocean. She reached the British outpost on Diego Garcia Island on 13 March and worked at that location for 16 days. On 29 March, Acadia headed for the east coast of Africa. She visited Mombasa, Kenya from 4 to 11 April, called at Mogadishu, the capital of Somalia, between 13 and 16 April, and paused overnight at Masirah, an island off the coast of Oman near the Horn of Africa, on 22 and 23 April. The destroyer tender returned to the base at Diego Garcia on 29 April and spent the next month there repairing warships on duty in the troubled waters of the Arabian Sea and the Persian Gulf.

On 2 June 1983, Acadia departed Diego Garcia on her way to Pattaya, Thailand. The ship arrived at Pattaya on 11 June. For the rest of the deployment, she operated in Far Eastern waters proper. From Pattaya, she steamed back to Subic Bay where she provided repair services to ships of the US 7th Fleet during the latter part of June. During July, Acadia called at Hong Kong, Pusan in Korea, and at Sasebo, Japan. On 16 July, the destroyer tender stood out of Sasebo on her way back to the United States. She took the usual break in the transpacific voyage at Pearl Harbor between 27 and 29 July and reentered San Diego harbor on 4 August.

Acadia remained at San Diego for about two months after her return from the Orient. Post-deployment stand down consumed the first month, but she got back to work providing repair service during the second. Near the middle of October, the destroyer tender voyaged north to Bremerton, Washington, where she carried on her duties until 4 November. Returning south by way of San Francisco, Acadia reached San Diego again on 12 November. She resumed repair work at San Diego upon her return and remained so occupied through the end of 1983 and well into 1984. In fact, the ship did not get underway again until late in March 1984 when she put to sea for three days in the southern California operating area. She returned to port on 23 March and resumed repair work until June. During the week of 11 to 18 June, Acadia made the round-trip to Monterey and back. In July, she participated in a midshipman summer training cruise and, in August, carried out refresher training in the local operating area. During the remaining months of 1984, the destroyer tender concentrated on repair work and preparations for her second deployment overseas.

Acadia embarked upon the voyage to the Far East on 5 January 1985. She stopped over in Pearl Harbor from 12 to 14 January and then resumed her journey west. Steaming by way of Guam, the destroyer tender arrived in Subic Bay on 2 February. She conducted repairs there for about a week and voyaged to Hong Kong for a port visit. The ship returned to Subic Bay during the latter part of February and stayed there until 8 March. At that time, she headed for Japan. During March, she called at Sasebo and at the Korean ports of Pusan and Chinhae. On 28 March, the tender returned to Japan at Yokosuka. Acadia spent the remainder of her tour of duty with the 7th Fleet at Yokosuka carrying out an extremely heavy schedule of repairs on warships assigned to that fleet. On 12 June, she set out upon the voyage home. Acadia stopped at Pearl Harbor as usual and pulled into San Diego on 3 July. After a month of leave and upkeep, the destroyer tender began preparations for her first regular overhaul. On 16 September, she moved to the former Southwest Marine Shipyard (now owned by BAE Systems, and renamed BAE Systems San Diego Ship Repair) in San Diego where she underwent repairs until mid-December.

Holiday leave and upkeep occupied the last half of December 1985, but Acadia launched into a full schedule of repair services in January 1986. Except for occasional brief periods at sea and a port visit to San Francisco in June, she remained at San Diego until September. Early in the month, she put to sea for refresher training and, on the 28th, embarked upon the passage to Alameda. Acadia arrived at the Naval Air Station, Alameda, on 1 October and began a busy six weeks of repair work there. The destroyer tender returned to San Diego in the middle of November and spent the remainder of 1986 in preparations for overseas movement.

Although originally slated to deploy in January 1987, Acadia provided repair services to ships in the San Diego area into the spring. On 14 April, the tender sailed for the western Pacific, and after touching at Pearl Harbor (21–22 April) and Subic Bay (8–18 May), was en route to Diego Garcia when she was rerouted to the Persian Gulf.

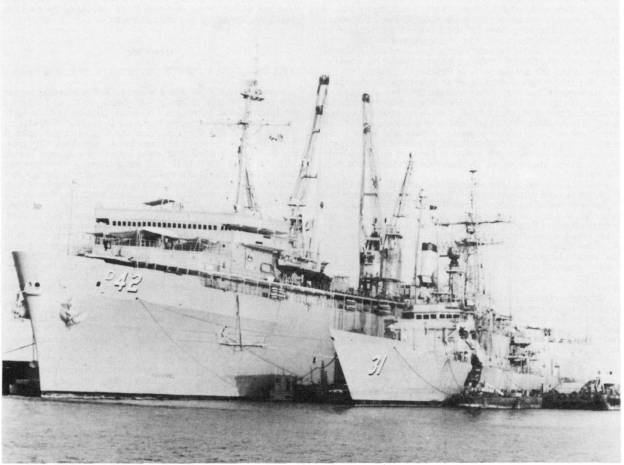
USS Acadia with USS Stark in port

An Iraqi Mirage F.1 had attacked and severely damaged the guided missile frigate Stark on 17 May 1987. The crippled ship had limped into Bahrain, where Acadia was dispatched soon thereafter. Between 1 and 27 June, Acadia provided berthing, messing, and repair services to Stark, "doing what she [Acadia] was designed to do, providing forward deployed support and battle damage repair..."

=== 1987–1994 ===
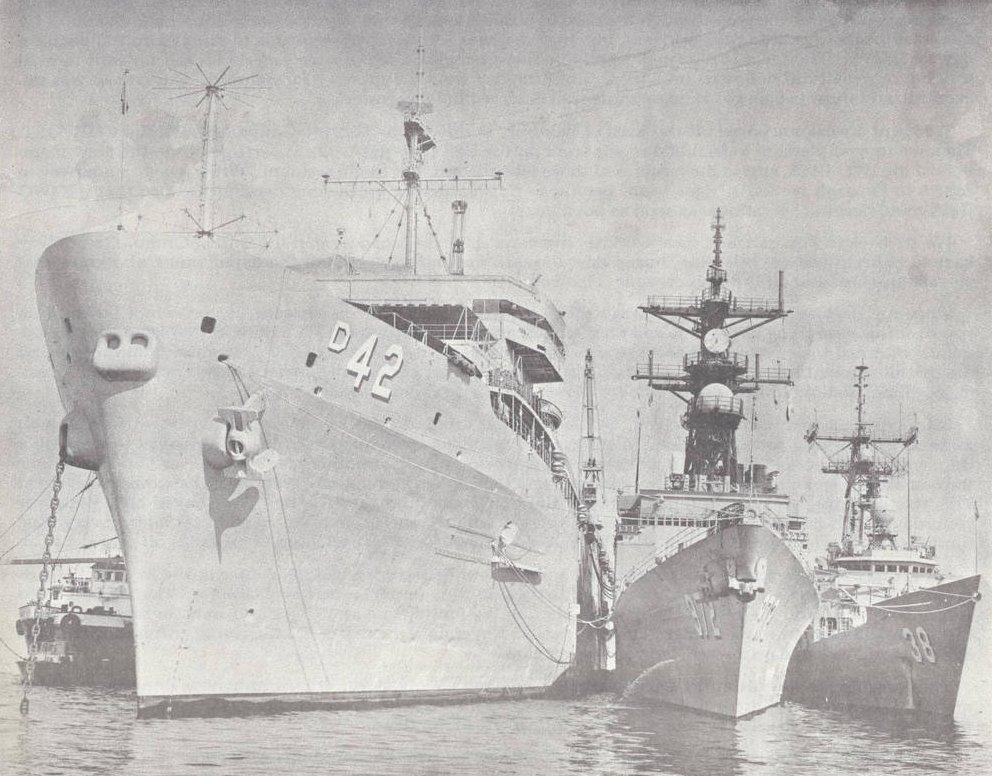
Acadia, with Oldendorf and Curts alongside, and a sea-going tug on the other, November 1990

On 5 September 1990 the ship departed San Diego for the Persian Gulf during Operation Desert Shield and Operation Desert Storm. She was responsible for the first reload of shipboard Tomahawk missiles outside the continental United States while pierside in Mina Jebel Ali. The reload recipient was the

This was the first wartime deployment of a mixed male-female crew on a U.S. Navy combat vessel with just over one-third of her crew being women. During this time, the ship was branded as the "love boat" when 36 of the crew's women (about 10%) discovered that they were pregnant. (Note: The Washington Times incorrectly characterized all 36 as having become "pregnant while deployed".) They were transferred off the ship due to a navy rule that required pregnant women be stationed within six hours of an obstetrician. Nine of the women had been already but unknowingly pregnant when the ship left port and five more were transferred in while unknowingly pregnant. The final 22 either became pregnant with a fellow crewmember, despite a prohibition on sexual relationships while deployed, or while on shore leave when the ship stopped in Hawaii, the Philippines, Singapore, and Thailand. A US Navy spokesperson at the time defended the ship's crew, noting that the ship's "pregnancy rate [was] lower than the civilian average—16%—for the age group of 20 to 24 year olds, and it [was] about half what the Navy would expect to see among its female population".

On 30 October 1990, the amphibious assault ship USS Iwo Jima (LPH-2) sustained a catastrophic mechanical failure when a high-pressure steam valve burst. This cost the lives of ten of her crew but repairs kept her fully operational for Operation Desert Storm after six weeks of repairs by Acadia.

On 18 February 1991, the guided missile cruiser Princeton struck two influence mines in the Persian Gulf just forward of her after 5-inch (127 mm) gun mount during Operation Desert Storm, resulting in a cracked superstructure, a jammed port rudder and leaking port shaft seal. Despite severe damage to her stern, her forward weapon systems and Aegis combat system were back online within 15 minutes. Princeton remained on station for 30 hours until relieved. Repairs performed by Acadia in the Mina Jebel Ali near Dubai took five weeks, after which Princeton returned to the United States under her own power for additional repairs. Acadia returned to San Diego at the end of her deployment and received the Navy Unit Commendation for her service during the Gulf War.

In the summer of 1993, Acadia conducted sea trials which earned her two Battle Es for warship preparedness prior to her pending deployment to the Western Pacific and Persian Gulf. In early November 1993 she got underway with a crew of around 1,500 was now half female. Acadia proceeded to Hawaii, then to Guam for supplies before setting course for Hong Kong. Plans called for her to visit Singapore and then the Persian Gulf, but because of ongoing tensions in Mogadishu, Somalia, Acadia received orders to divert to Somalia way to her way to the United Arab Emirates. She encountered Typhoon Kyle in the South China Sea before she called briefly at Singapore for mail and personnel exchange. She then set out for Bali, conducting Acadia′s last crossing of the equator en route. Acadia visited Bali for rest and recreation, her crew's last scheduled time ashore for over a month.

Acadia arrived off Mogadishu during the first week of December 1993. Upon arrival, a seaman from the Boats and Cranes Division of the Deck Department was knocked overboard while lowering the ship's stairwell. The waters were known to be shark-infested as fishing vessels and fish factory ships frequently dumped their byproducts in the ocean. Fortunately, the seaman was rescued quickly by rescue swimmers and a small boat Acadia launched.

Acadia delivered overdue medical, dental, supply, and repair services to United States Marine Corps and U.S. Navy personnel that in Mogadishu by conducting boat runs operated by the Boats and Cranes Division. Many of the U.S. personnel ashore had been without running water for days or weeks and obviously were worn out by their duties ashore. To brighten the spirits of U.S. personnel ashore, Acadia′ crew created a choir to perform for Christmas, adding comical flare by rewording the "Twelve Days of Christmas" to reflect their time underway and presence in Mogadishu. The ship continued to support personnel at Mogadishu until 30 December 1993, when she got underway for the Strait of Oman and the United Arab Emirates, where she operated in support of U.S. Navy surface ships and submarines for three weeks. Her final voyage home involved calls at Hong Kong; Sasebo and Yokosuka, Japan; Guam; and Pearl Harbor, Hawaii, before arriving a San Diego in mid-April 1994. After their return, Acadia and her crew received the Joint Forces Armed Expeditionary Medal and a bronze star on their Southwest Asia Service Medal.

== Decommissioning and fate ==
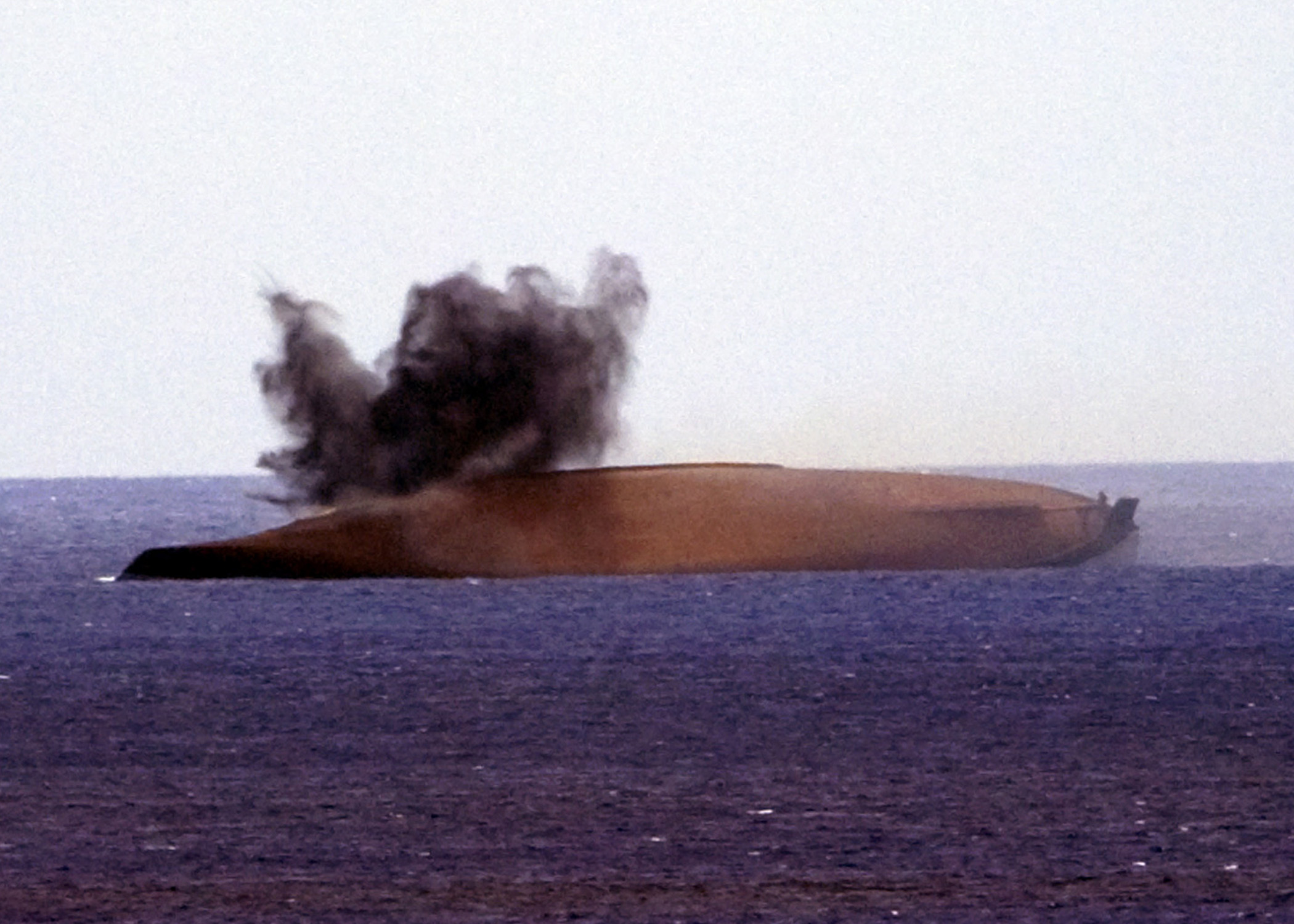
Ex-USS Acadia lies on her starboard side off the coast of Guam

On 16 December 1994, Acadia was decommissioned and laid up at the Naval Inactive Ship Maintenance Facility (NISMF), Pearl Harbor, Hawaii. She was struck from the Naval Register on 13 December 2007 and used as a target off Guam as part of a day-long bombardment of ordnance delivered from naval aircraft and ships during exercise Valiant Shield on 19–20 September 2010. She sank on 20 September 2010.
