= Samuel Gompers-class destroyer tender =

1966 class of American destroyer tenders

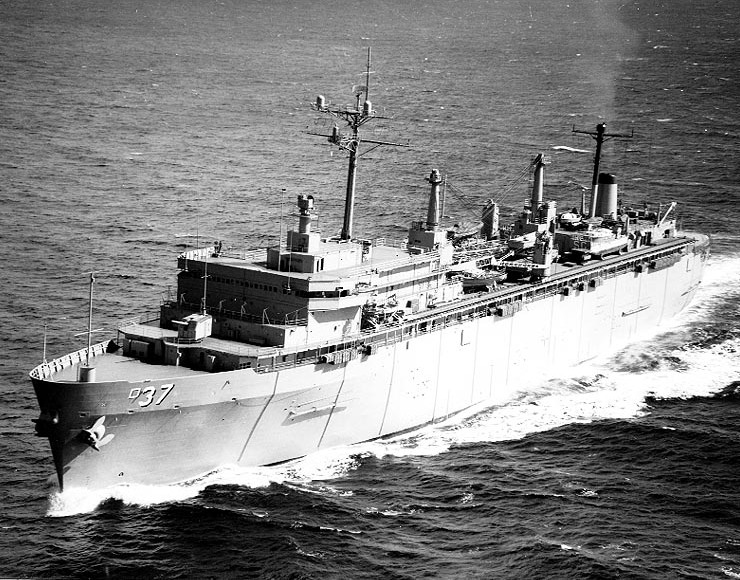
- USS Samuel Gompers

Class overview
- Operators: United States Navy
- Preceded by: Shenandoah class
- Succeeded by: Yellowstone class
- Planned: 4
- Completed: 2
- Canceled: 2
- Retired: 2

General characteristics
- Type: Destroyer tender
- Displacement: 13,458 long tons (13,674 t)
- Length: 645 ft (197 m)
- Beam: 85 ft (26 m)
- Draft: 22 ft 6 in (6.86 m)
- Propulsion: Steam turbines, 1 shaft
- Speed: 20 knots (37 km/h; 23 mph)
- Complement: 1056 officers and enlisted
- Armament: Originally: 1 x 5"/38 caliber gun; 2 x 20 mm cannon; 4 x .50 cal (12.7 mm) caliber machine guns

The Samuel Gompers-class destroyer tenders were a class of ships that served the United States Navy from 1967 to 1996. Their namesake was union leader Samuel Gompers.

== History ==
The Samuel Gompers-class was the first class of destroyer tenders designed by the U.S. Navy, twenty years after the preceding Shenandoah-class. The ships were specifically designed to be able to service ships with nuclear propulsion or with gas turbines. The ships were also able to service the variety of guided missiles coming into service. They also had a helicopter platform aft, although only Puget Sound was later fitted with a hangar, when she served as flagship of the United States Sixth Fleet. Both ships were originally armed with a World War II-vintage 5"/38 caliber gun turret forward. The construction of two additional ships (AD-39, AD-40) was cancelled in 1969 and 1974.

== Ships in class ==
Ship name	Hull no.	Builder	Laid down	Launched	Commissioned	Decommissioned	Fate	DANFS	NVR Page
Samuel Gompers	AD-37	Puget Sound Naval Shipyard	7 September 1964	14 May 1966	1 July 1967	27 October 1995	Sunk as target, 22 July 2003		
Puget Sound	AD-38	Puget Sound Naval Shipyard	15 February 1965	16 September 1966	27 April 1968	27 January 1996	Sold for scrap, 2008		
