= USS Klondike =

Tender of the United States Navy

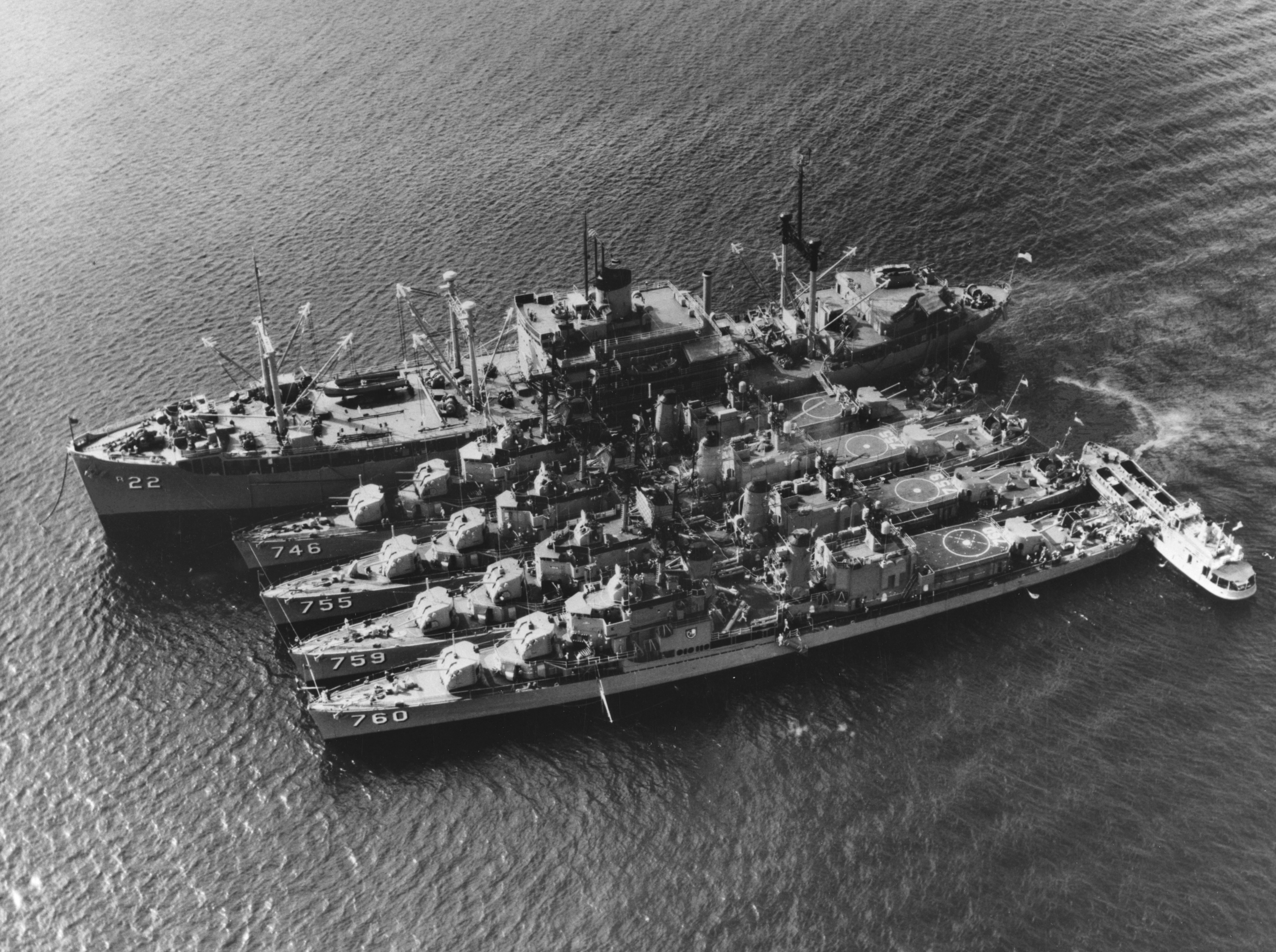
- Klondike in Subic Bay, Philippines, on 1 November 1963. The destroyers alongside are all "FRAM II" types of Destroyer Squadron 15.

History

United States
- Name: USS Klondike
- Builder: Los Angeles Shipbuilding and Dry Dock Company, San Pedro, California
- Launched: 12 August 1944
- Commissioned: 30 July 1945
- Decommissioned: 15 December 1970
- Reclassified: AR-22 (Repair ship), 20 February 1960
- Stricken: 15 September 1974
- Honours and awards: 1 campaign star (Vietnam)
- Fate: Scrapped 1975

General characteristics
- Class & type: Klondike-class destroyer tender
- Displacement: 8,165 long tons (8,296 t) light; 11,755 long tons (11,944 t) full
- Length: 492 ft (150 m)
- Beam: 69 ft 8 in (21.23 m)
- Draft: 27 ft 3 in (8.31 m)
- Propulsion: Geared turbines, 8,500 shp (6,338 kW)
- Speed: 18.4 knots (34.1 km/h; 21.2 mph)
- Complement: 826
- Armament: 1 × 5"/38 caliber gun; 4 × 3"/23 caliber guns; 4 × 40 mm AA guns; 20 × 20 mm guns

USS Klondike (AD-22/AR-22) was a destroyer tender in service the United States Navy from 1945 to 1970. In 1960, she was redesignated as a repair ship. After spending another five years in reserve, she was sold for scrap in 1975.

== History ==
Klondike was named for the Klondike River in the Yukon Territory, Canada, which was the scene of the gold rush of 1897. The Klondike class destroyer tenders were a Navy adaptation of the Maritime Commission's C3 fast cargo ship design. Klondike was launched 12 August 1944 by Los Angeles Shipbuilding and Dry Dock Company, San Pedro, California, sponsored by Mrs. Dorothy J. Diirck, and commissioned at San Pedro on 30 July 1945.

=== 1945–1955 ===
After shakedown, Klondike loaded hundreds of tons of spares and stores in preparation for the task of supplying and maintaining destroyers. She departed San Pedro on 19 October for Pearl Harbor, Hawaii arriving the 25th. Recalled to the West Coast, she sailed from Pearl on 7 November with 500 home-bound veterans embarked and arrived in San Diego on 15 November. On 21 November she became the flagship for Commander, San Diego Group, 19th Fleet and commenced inactivation operations on ships scheduled for the Pacific Reserve Fleet. Placed on an inactive status (in commission, in reserve) on 30 November 1946, Klondike was placed in service in late September 1948. She served as flagship of the San Diego Group, Pacific Reserve Fleet until 11 May 1955.

=== 1959–1970 ===
Klondike recommissioned 15 July 1959 at Long Beach, California. Returning to San Diego on 4 December, she provided repair facilities as a unit of ServRon 1. On 20 February 1960 she was re-classified as repair ship USS Klondike (AR-22) and she repaired vessels at San Diego, Long Beach, and San Francisco until 15 July 1961. Klondike then departed San Diego for duty in the Far East. Assigned to ServRon 3, she arrived at Yokosuka, Japan on 4 August and until 23 February 1962 she provided repair facilities at Sasebo and Iwakuni, Japan and Subic Bay, Philippines for the peace-keeping ships of the 7th Fleet. Returning to the West Coast on 11 March, she resumed her duty out of San Diego.

Departing San Diego on 17 July 1963, Klondike steamed via Pearl Harbor for the Western Pacific. While en route to Sasebo, she offered assistance 6 through 9 August 1963 to a distressed Greek freighter Cryssism during a raging typhoon. Reaching Sasebo on 11 August, she proceeded to Subic Bay 15 August for repair ship station duty. Klondike operated in the Far East until 30 November, then she returned to the United States, arriving San Diego on 14 December 1963. During the next year she continued servicing ships while operating out of San Diego.

During the Vietnam War Klondike participated in the Tet Counteroffensive from 31 March 1969 to 24 April 1969 . She repaired a river supply ship that collided with a destroyer and was struck in her aft section by enemy fire from river boats. For her service in Vietnam, the Klondike was awarded the Vietnam Service Medal with one Bronze Star for the Tet Counteroffensive and the Republic of Vietnam Campaign Medal.

Klondike was struck from the Naval Register on 15 September 1974, after which time custody was transferred to the Maritime Administration for disposal. Klondike was sold by MARAD on 8 May 1975 at San Diego to American Ship Dismantlers Inc.
