= Todd Pacific Shipyards, Los Angeles Division =

Shipyard in Los Angeles, California, U.S.

Coordinates: 33°45′11″N 118°16′48″W

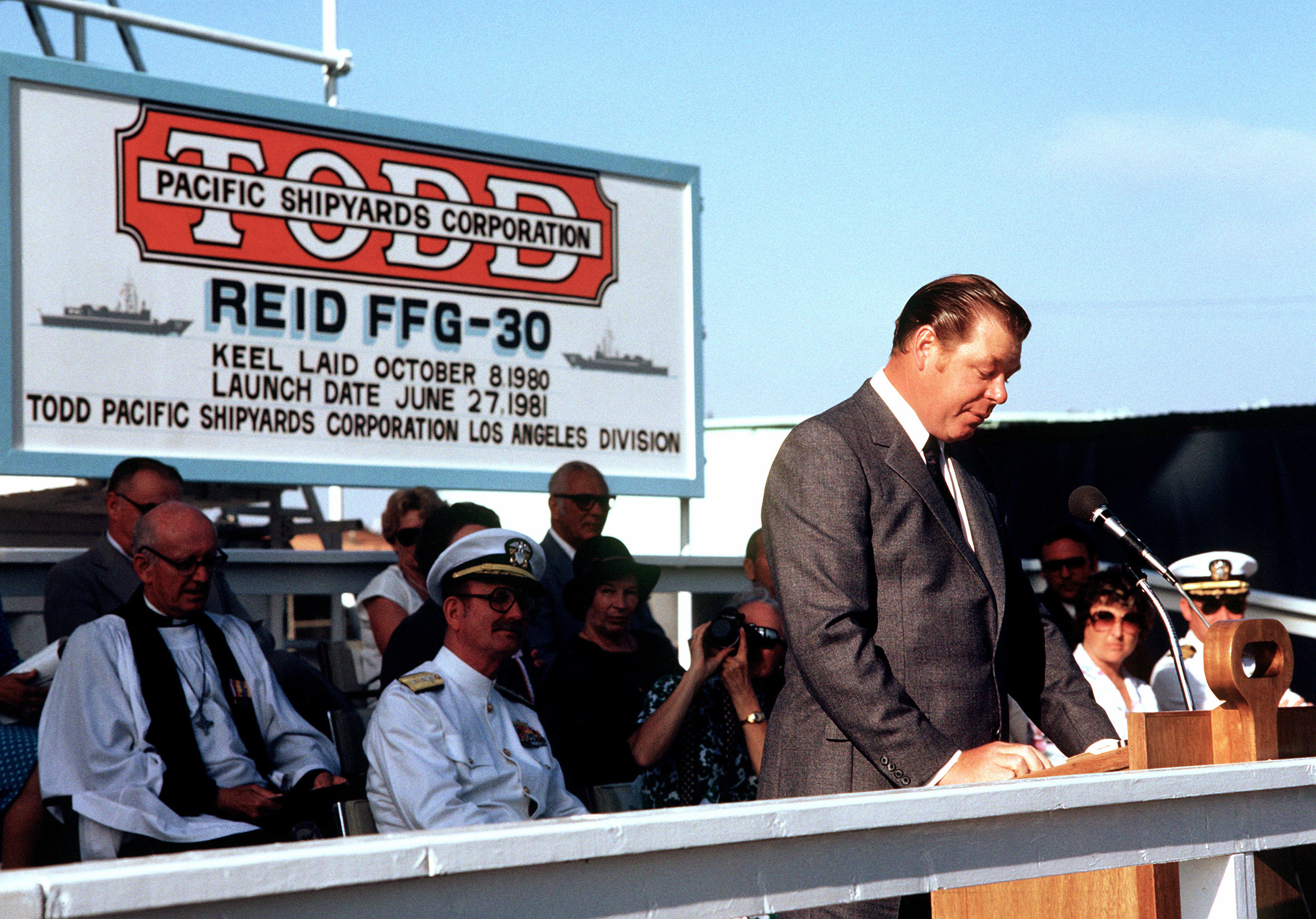
- Christening and launch of USS Reid (FFG-30), 1981
- Industry: Shipbuilding
- Predecessor: Los Angeles Shipbuilding & Dry Dock Company; Todd Shipyards, Los Angeles Division
- Founded: 1917
- Defunct: 1989
- Fate: Liquidated
- Headquarters: San Pedro, Los Angeles, California
- Parent: Todd Pacific Shipyards, a wholly owned subsidiary of Todd Shipyards Corporation

Todd Pacific Shipyards, Los Angeles Division was a shipyard in San Pedro, Los Angeles, California. Before applying its last corporate name, the shipyard had been called Los Angeles Shipbuilding & Dry Dock Company and Todd Shipyards, Los Angeles Division. Under those three names, the San Pedro yard built at least 130 ships from 1917 to 1989.

The yard opened during the World War I shipping boom, survived bankruptcy in the Great Depression and built Auxiliary ships during World War II. The yard was seized by the Navy in late 1943 and given to Todd Shipyards to manage for the remainder of the war. The yard struggled through the post war period and surged again with commercial work in the 1960s to mid-1970s. The yard peaked again in 1983 during a Navy frigate contract, but was closed in 1989 after failing to secure a DDG-51 contract. The former site was a container terminal in 2015.

== Los Angeles Shipbuilding and Dry Dock Company (1917–1943) ==
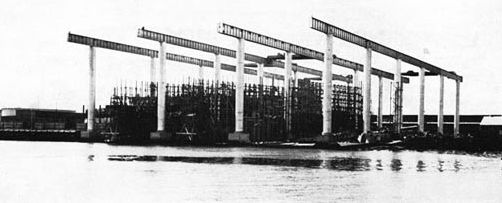
Los Angeles Shipbuilding and Drydock Corporation Plant, San Pedro, California, in 1942

The Los Angeles Shipbuilding and Dry Dock Company was founded in April 1917 for the purpose of establishing a shipbuilding and repair facility in Los Angeles Harbor during World War I with Fred L. Baker of Baker Iron Works as president. 69 acres (28 ha) of marsh land on Smiths Island were used for the original construction. The yard received 35 contracts to build cargo ships for the Emergency Fleet Corporation (EFC) of the United States Shipping Board. 30 of the ships were to be 8,800 DWT Design 1013 ships and 5 were 11,500 DWT. The first keel was laid 23 July 1917 for SS Accomac. Triple expansion steam engines of 3,500hp were produced on site, but hulls 1 through 8 were powered by Westinghouse steam turbines. By 1920, the yard had a 12,000 ton floating dry dock, which cost $1.25 million ($23.2 million today) to build. The first four freighters were delivered in July 1918 and another four were delivered before the war ended.

Delivered in November 1921, SS West Chopaka was the 35th and final ship built for the US Shipping Board at San Pedro. In total, the contracts cost $72 million ($1.3 billion today) for around 320,000 DWT of cargo freighters. This made Los Angeles Shipbuilding the largest of the three steel shipyards in the Ports of Los Angeles and Long Beach, accounting for 55% of the tonnage built there during the World War I shipbuilding boom for the United States Shipping Board.

Around 5 May 1919, 6,000 workers at Los Angeles SB&DDC went on strike after demands for a closed shop were not met. On 31 May 1919, federal mediation was sought with mediator Captain Charles T. Connell listed as a potential mediator. The yard was reopened on 10 July 1919, without resolving the dispute, Many of the workers did not return and had found other work elsewhere. Around 70 of the 6,000 returned in the first days with about 1,500 back by the end of July 1919.

For the remainder of the 1920s, after the US Shipping Board projects finished, Los Angeles SB&DDC built a number of tank barges. Additionally, the yard built SS Catalina in 1924 and in 1925, Los Angeles City #2 fireboat, which later was known as Ralph J. Scott.

Los Angeles SB&DDC mainly did ship repairs in the 1930s until the yard received Navy contracts for several auxiliary ships in the lead up to World War II. By the time the war broke out, management had changed a number of times at the yard. Los Angeles SB&DDC had entered bankruptcy during the Great Depression and several corporate reorganizations resulted in several changes in management. The original shareholders of Los Angeles SB&DDC were also frozen out by a Supreme Court decision that gave precedence to bondholders over the shareholders. Los Angeles SB&DDC had become a wholly owned subsidiary of Los Angeles Lumber Products, which was a party in Case v. Los Angeles Lumber Products. That case was decided in 1939 and became a landmark decision in corporate bankruptcy law.

In the 1930s, the yard made some attempts to get oil tanker contracts and a Navy destroyer contract, but lost bids to east coast shipyards. Beginning 14 November 1936, there was an 87-day labor strike by 500 workers at several Los Angeles area yards, including Los Angeles SB&DDC. The strike ended 9 February 1937 with a $.06 raise, making the top hourly rate $0.95 an hour. In 1939, the company submitted bids for C1-B cargo ships of the United States Maritime Commission's Long Range Shipbuilding Program, but was unsuccessful.

== Navy seizure and operation by Todd Shipyards (1943–1946) ==
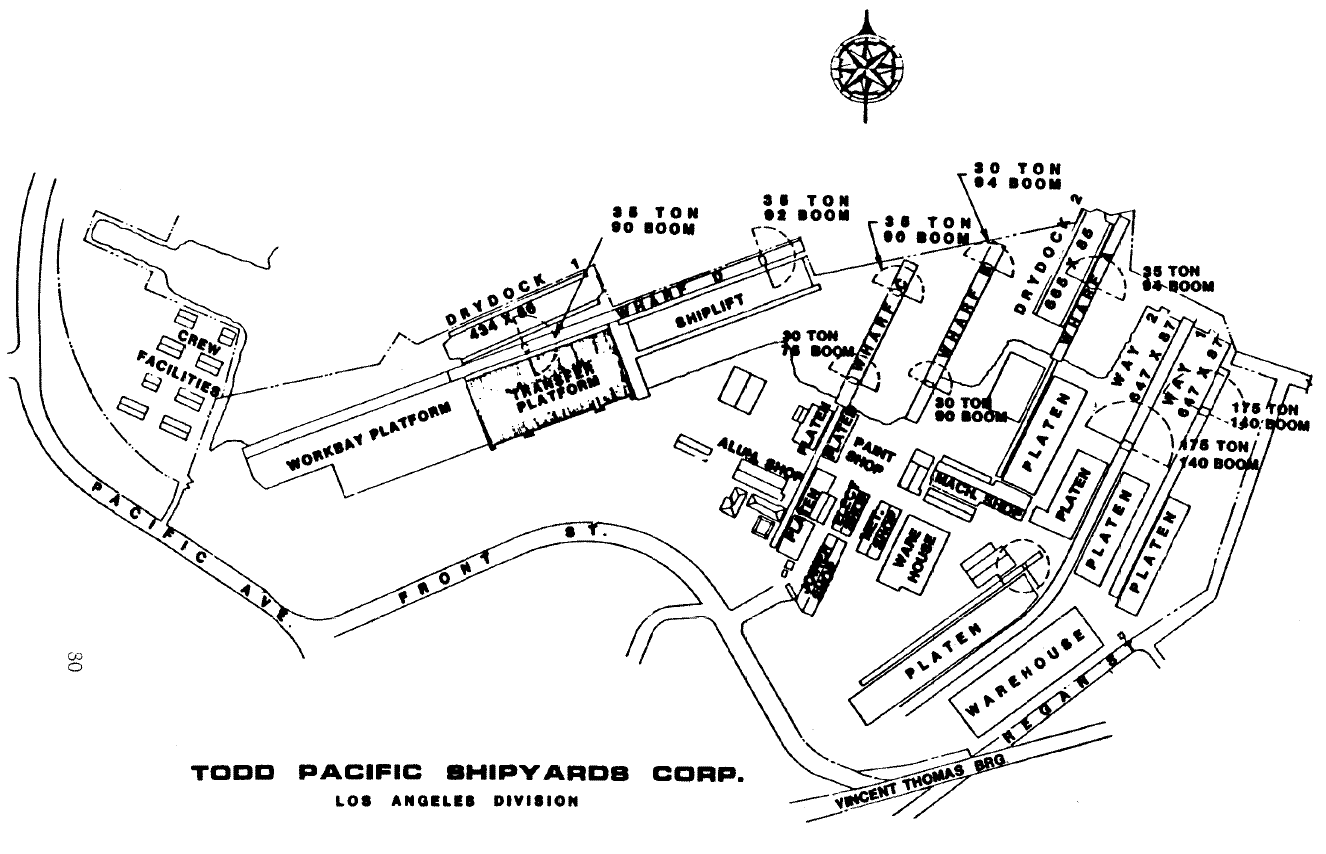
A diagram of the shipyard near its post-war peak in 1983

On 27 September 1943 a special Naval Board of Investigation was convened in San Pedro to look into the conditions at Los Angeles SB&DDC. The Navy had invested around $64 million in equipment and construction contracts at the company and had a number of concerns regarding management of those assets. According to Admiral Harold G. Bowen, Sr. the yard had no cost accounting system other than a system set up to bill and receive funds from the Navy. There were no modern industrial lines to increase production efficiency. The committee found that between $5 and $7 million were unaccounted for on the repair ship Ajax which was under construction at the yard. They attributed it to "inefficient management and a poorly organized labor union" rather than fraud. The Navy made attempts to get management to correct the problems, but negotiations failed.

On 8 December 1943, the US Navy seized control of Los Angeles SB&DDC under an executive order signed by President Franklin D. Roosevelt. Bowen found the yard to be in worse condition than the investigating board realized. Management was turned over to Todd Shipyards, which operated a number of other shipyards around the country. Todd would manage the yard for the Navy until the war ended after which Todd purchased the yard outright.

Admiral Bowen described the situation at the yard in detail in his 1954 memoir, Ships, Machinery and Mossbacks. According to Bowen, the seizure saved the government over $13 million. For example, USS Ajax (AR-6), built in San Pedro, cost $24.8 million, but sister ship USS Vulcan (AR-5), constructed in Camden, cost only $12.8 million. It also took nearly a year longer to construct Ajax.

During the war, the yard built three of the four Vulcan-class repair ships, three of the four Currituck-class seaplane tenders and all four Klondike-class destroyer tenders. According to The American West: The Reader, under Todd's management, the yard converted 2,376 ships in the final years of the war.

== Operating as Todd Shipyards, Los Angeles Division (1946–1977) ==
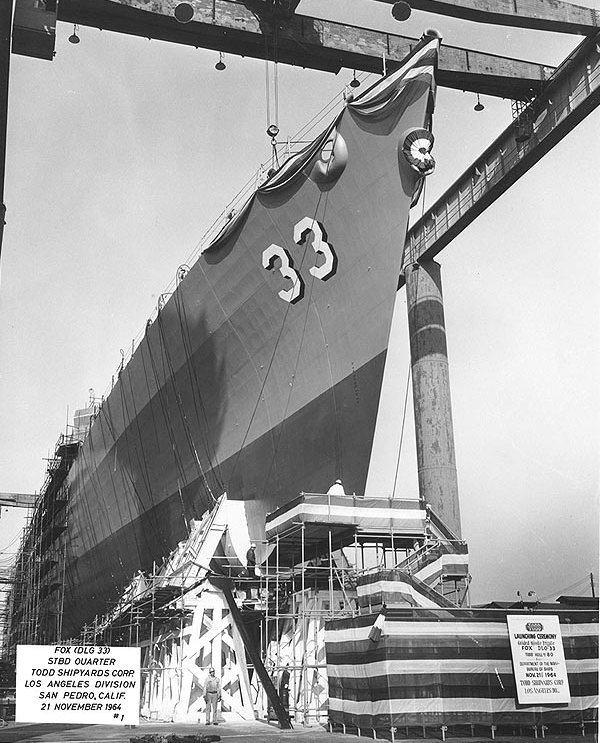
USS Fox (DLG-33) ready for launching in San Pedro, 21 November 1964

Todd Shipyards purchased the Los Angeles SB&DDC after World War II and began to operate this shipyard as the Todd Shipyards, Los Angeles Division beginning in November 1946. Wartime labor at the LA division peaked at around 20,000 workers.

After the war ended the LA division turned to ship repair and conversions, and to machine work and fabrication for other industries. Business volume declined until the Korean War, but then dropped even lower after it ended in 1953. The LA division had projects in the early 1950s for Disneyland as well. They built the replica of the sternwheel riverboat Mark Twain. Todd's Hoboken, New Jersey, operation built two sternwheel riverboats for Freedomland U.S.A., a theme park in New York City that existed from 1960 to 1964. Todd's contributions to the park and the sternwheelers are documented in Freedomland U.S.A.: The Definitive History published by Theme Park Press (2019). One boat was destroyed during 2005 and the other during 2018. The LA division also constructed eight 52-foot tourist submarines and the masts, rigging, spars and sails of Sailing Ship Columbia after the Korean War. According to their long range facilities plan, Todd reported that no major ships were built in California following World War II until the state property tax structure was changed in 1958.

Todd invested heavily into the LA division in the years following the 1958 tax changes and built a number of cargo ships for various companies. The LA division built two cruisers, England and Fox in the 1960s and seven Knox-class frigates in the late 1960s. It also converted USS Paul Revere (APA-248) and USS Ashtabula (AO-51).

The LA division manufactured "thousands of feet of special piping for the Atomic Energy Commission." They also did work fabricating test missiles for the Polaris missile program and a base for a tracking antenna used by NASA.

In the early 1970s, the LA division built four handysize 25,000 DWT tankers for Marine Transport Lines and four 35,000 DWT tankers for Zapata Marine, but contracts for eight 90,000 DWT tankers were cancelled in 1975 during the 1970s energy crisis and in the wake of the 1973 oil crisis.

== Operating as Todd Pacific Shipyards, Los Angeles Division (1977–1989) ==
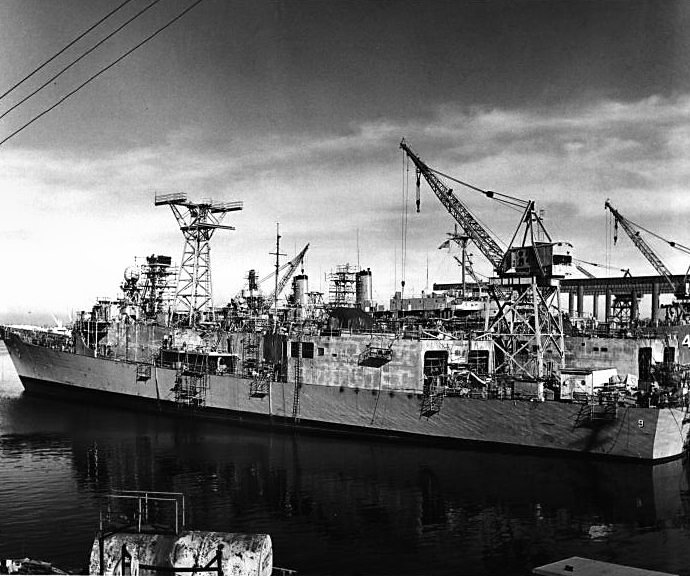
USS Wadsworth (FFG-9) under construction in San Pedro, c. 1979

On 1 October 1977, Todd Pacific Shipyards Corporation was formed as a wholly owned subsidiary of Todd Shipyards Corporation. Todd's Seattle and Los Angeles divisions were spun off into Todd Pacific Shipyards. Eighteen Oliver Hazard Perry-class frigates were built at the San Pedro yard. In 1983 the yard employed 5,600, by 1989 it employed only 400. The yard occupied 112 acres (45 ha) of land, leased from the Port of Los Angeles, at its close in 1989.

Parent company Todd Shipyards entered Chapter 11 in August 1987. The LA division closed in 1989 following completion of its last Oliver Hazard Perry-class frigate, USS Ingraham. Todd had failed to win an Arleigh Burke-class destroyer contract. The property where at least 130 ships were built in just over 70 years was returned to the Port of Los Angeles. As of 2015, it was known as Berth 100 / West Basin Container Terminal.

== See also ==
- 1983 Pacific Coast Metal Trades Union strike, a strike which affected the parent company of the Los Angeles Division
- Vigor Marine Group, the company that acquired Todd Pacific Shipyards in 2011
