= Destroyer tender =

Type of naval auxiliary ship

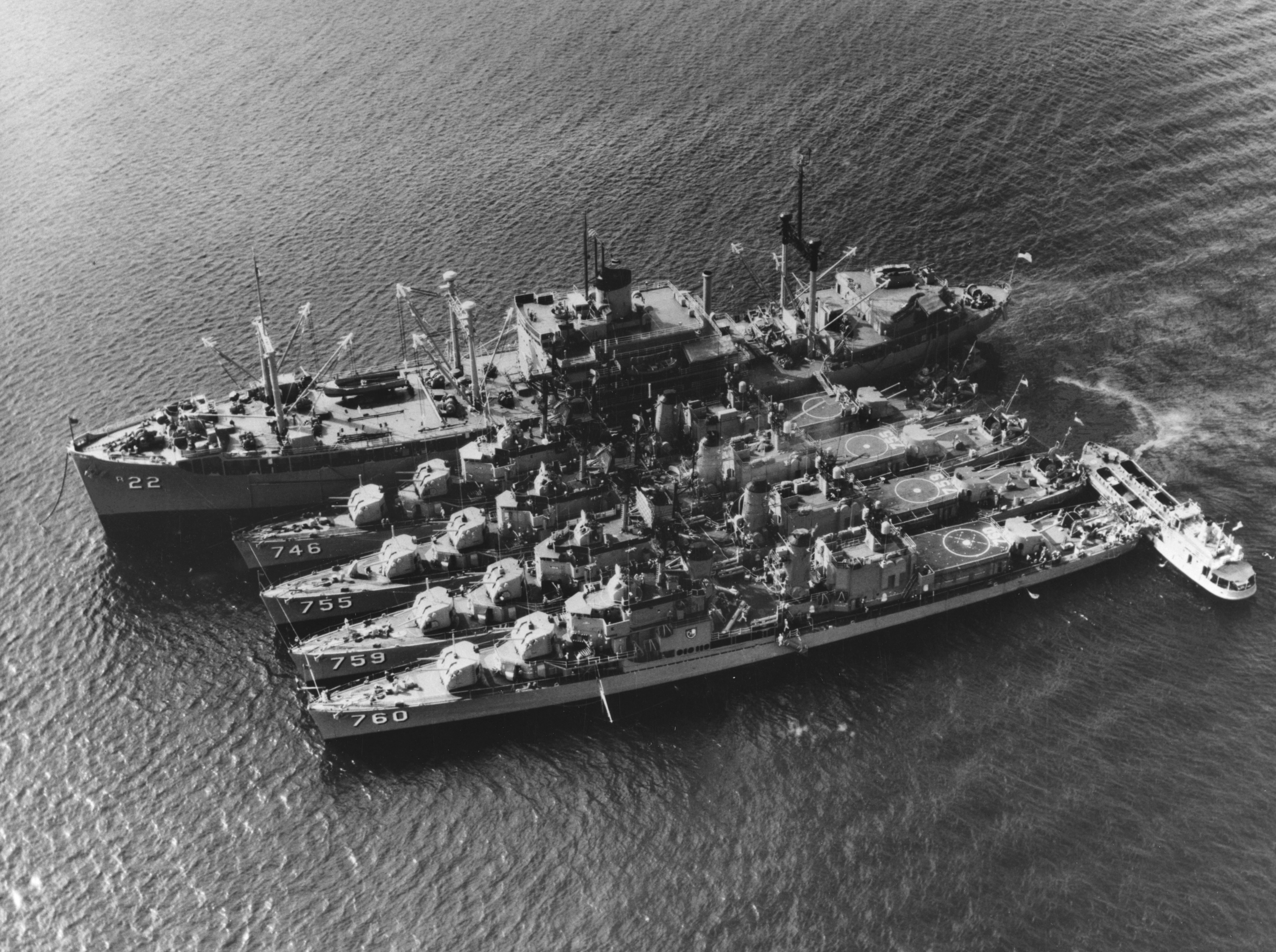
The destroyer tender Klondike with a flotilla of Allen M. Sumner-class destroyers, Subic Bay, Philippines, November 1963

A destroyer tender or destroyer depot ship is a type of depot ship: an auxiliary ship designed to provide maintenance support to a flotilla of destroyers or other small warships. The use of this class has faded from its peak in the first half of the 20th century as the roles and weaponry of small combatants have evolved (in conjunction with technological advances in propulsion reliability and efficiency).

== Background ==
As the Industrial Revolution progressed, steam-powered steel ships replaced sail-powered wooden ships; but naval artillery remained the preferred weapon. The first large warship to be sunk by a torpedo was the Chilean ironclad Blanco Encalada in 1891. As major naval powers realized the vulnerability of their expensive battleships to inexpensive torpedo boats, they started building defensive flotillas of torpedo boat destroyers or destroyers for short.

The earliest torpedo boat destroyers were small, to maximize maneuverability, and powered by large steam engines, to maximize speed to intercept enemy torpedo boats before they could get close to the battleships. These torpedo boat destroyers were so full of machinery, coal, quick-firing guns and ammunition that there was not enough room for living quarters for their crew. Destroyer tenders with berthing and dining accommodations for the destroyer crews joined the fleet train of colliers accompanying the battle fleet. The destroyer tenders also carried cooks, administrative and medical personnel, and senior ratings qualified to repair the destroyer machinery. Although individual destroyers were too small for these specialized personnel, the skills of those aboard the tender were available to the whole destroyer flotilla. The tender also carried a supply of spare parts for destroyer machinery.

== Evolution ==
When the Great White Fleet circled the globe in 1907, it was accompanied by a tender, USS Yankton, and a repair ship, USS Panther. Repair ships did not offer the personnel services of a tender, but offered a broader range of repair capability, including equipment and personnel for repair of more significant machinery failures or battle damage. Repair ships carried a fully equipped machine shop and foundry capable of completing any repair not requiring a drydock.

Destroyer displacement had increased to 1,000 tons by World War I and to 2,000 tons for destroyers accompanying the Fast Carrier Task Forces of World War II. United States destroyer tenders of World War II carried some destroyer ammunition and depth charges, and performed torpedo maintenance and resupply, but focused on repair work. The Dixie class had a foundry, forge, metal lathes, and welders for heavy repairs, plus an optical shop and clockmakers to repair binoculars, sextants, marine chronometers, optical rangefinders, and fire-control system computers. These tenders operated stills and electric generators to supply fresh water and electrical power to destroyers moored alongside for boiler repair.

Each increment of size enabled destroyers to carry more of the personnel and equipment previously found on the tender. Destroyers reached the size of cruisers during the Cold War, and with that size acquired a cruiser's capability for independent action. Surviving tenders became functionally indistinguishable from repair ships.

Some destroyer tenders were designed and built to attend a flotilla of destroyers, while others were converted from ships built for other purposes. Tabled below is a comparison of ships designed as destroyer tenders:

| Name | Date | Number | Nation | Displacement | Speed | Crew |
|---|---|---|---|---|---|---|
| USS Melville | 1915 | 1 | US | 5,250 tons | 15 knots | 600 |
| HMS Greenwich | 1915 | 1 | UK | 8,100 tons | 11 knots | 224 |
| Altair class | 1918 | 3 | US | 6.250 tons | 10.5 knots | 481 |
| Dobbin class | 1921 | 2 | US | 8,325 tons | 16 knots | 600 |
| Dixie class | 1939 | 5 | US | 9,450 tons | 19 knots | 1,262 |
| Hamul class | 1940 | 2 | US | 8,560 tons | 17 knots | 857 |
| Hecla class | 1940 | 2 | UK | 10,850 tons | 17 knots | 818 |
| Klondike class | 1944 | 4 | US | 8,560 tons | 18 knots | 860 |
| Shenandoah class | 1944 | 6 | US | 11,755 tons | 18 knots | 1,035 |
| Samuel Gompers class | 1966 | 2 | US | 21,000 tons | 18 knots | 1,803 |
| Yellowstone class | 1979 | 4 | US | 20,224 tons | 18 knots | 1,595 |

== See also ==
- List of auxiliaries of the United States Navy § Destroyer Tenders (AD)
- Submarine tender

== Sources ==
- Blackman, Raymond V.B. (1970–1971). Jane's Fighting Ships. London: Jane's Yearbooks.
- Cooney, David M. (1980). Ships, Aircraft and Weapons of the United States Navy. Washington, D.C.: United States Government Printing Office.
- Fahey, James C. (1978). The Ships and Aircraft of the U.S. Fleet (Two Ocean Fleet ed.). Annapolis, Maryland: Naval Institute Press. ISBN 0-87021-634-1.
- Lenton, H.T.; Colledge, J.J. (1964). British and Dominion Warships of World War II. Garden City, New York: Doubleday & Company.
- Potter, E.B.; Nimitz, Chester W. (1960). Sea Power. Englewood Cliffs, New Jersey: Prentice-Hall.
- Silverstone, Paul H. (1968). U.S. Warships of World War II. Garden City, New York: Doubleday & Company.
