= Operation Forager logistics =

Logistics of World War II invasion

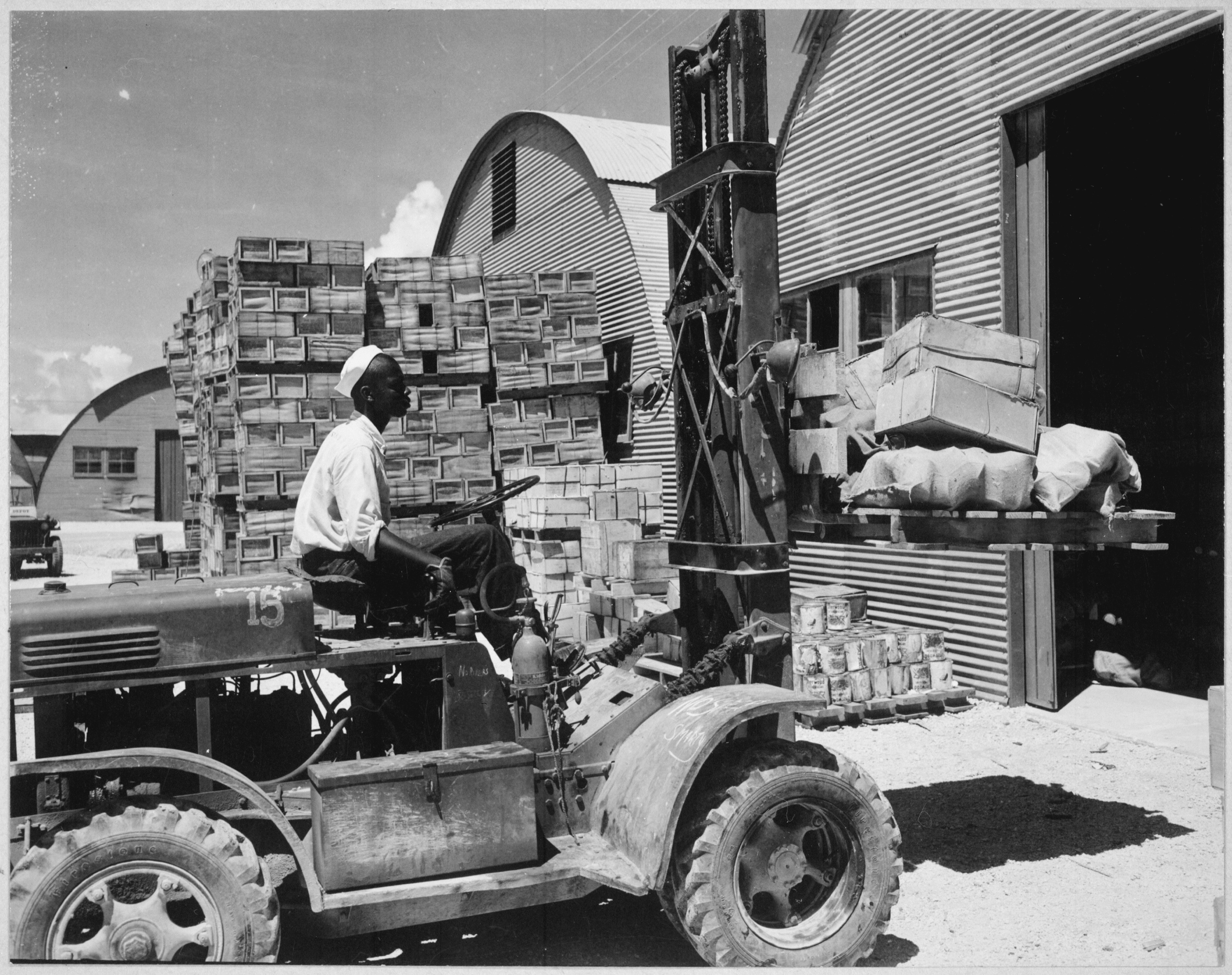
Operating a forklift at the Navy supply depot on Guam

Operation Forager, the American invasion of the Mariana Islands in June and July 1944 during World War II, was the largest amphibious operation of the Pacific War to that date. It involved the movement and support of a fleet and 166,000 ground troops over extremely long distances. Intervention and disruption by Japanese air and naval forces was anticipated. This meant that not only did the forces ashore have to be supplied with enough resources to continue operations if unloading was interrupted, but a fleet of warships had to be maintained at sea for up to four months.

A crucial problem was the provision of sufficient shipping. A shortage of ships and cargo space forced units to leave some vehicles and equipment behind, and some units had to travel on separate ships from their equipment. Unloading was facilitated by the use of wooden pallets, but not all cargo ships had the space or equipment to accommodate them. On Guam the reef prevented landing craft from directly accessing the beach and pallets had to be broken up and stores transferred to DUKWs or Landing Vehicles, Tracked, (LVTs) on the reef.

Two dozen replenishment oilers were on hand to enable the fleet to refuel at sea. For the first time in the Central Pacific Area, the Japanese targeted oilers. With the fleet at sea for over four months, many stores aboard ran low. These were replenished by general stores issue ships carrying 5,000 different items. The Battle of the Philippine Sea and staunch Japanese resistance ashore on Saipan and later Guam resulted in a longer campaign than anticipated, with increased calls for naval gunfire support, and consequently prodigious ammunition consumption. Most resupply ships were not vertically loaded, which made retrieving the most urgently needed items more problematic. Ammunition ships were called forward to replenish the fleet off Saipan while the battle still raged on shore, a risky action as Japanese air attacks occurred almost every day.

After the battle, the Mariana Islands were developed into a major naval and air base. Hospitals on the islands received wounded from the Battle of Iwo Jima and the Battle of Okinawa. Boeing B-29 Superfortress bombers were based on the islands and conducted air raids on Japan, including the bombing of Tokyo on 10 March 1945 and the atomic bombings of Hiroshima and Nagasaki.

== Background ==
Operation Forager, the U.S. invasion of the Mariana Islands during World War II, involved the movement and support of a fleet of ships and two corps of ground troops over a distance of 3,200 miles (5,100 km) from Hawaii. It was the largest amphibious operation of the Pacific War to that date. The American forces were part of Admiral Raymond A. Spruance's Fifth Fleet. The Joint Amphibious Forces (Task Force 51) were led by Vice Admiral Richmond K. Turner and the expeditionary troops (Task Force 56) by Lieutenant General Holland M. Smith.

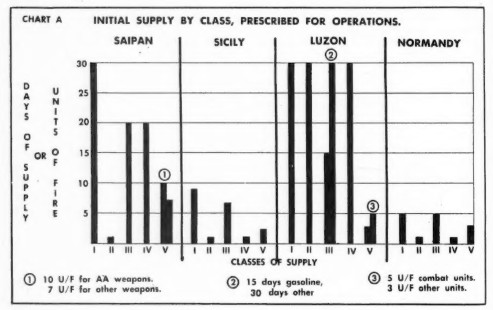
Initial supply by classes for Saipan, Sicily, Luzon and Normandy

The Mariana Islands were mountainous, with a total land area of about 72 square miles (19,000 ha). Unlike the small, low-lying coral atolls captured in the Gilbert and Marshall Islands campaign, there was little prospect of the islands being overrun quickly and prolonged fighting was a possibility. Accordingly, the assault troops carried 32 days' supply of rations, 30 days worth of medical supplies, 20 days' supply of fuel, and seven units of fire for all weapons, except anti-aircraft guns, for which ten units of fire were taken. (Note: A unit of fire was a somewhat arbitrary measurement for accounting purposes, and was different for each type of ammunition. It was 133 rounds for the 105 mm howitzer, 75 rounds for the 155 mm howitzer, 50 rounds for the 155 mm gun, and 50 rounds for the 8 inch howitzer.)

This represented 1.22 short tons (1.11 t) per soldier, considerably more than the 0.84 short tons (0.76 t) per soldier of the US forces engaged in the invasion of Sicily the year before. The supply lines to Sicily were reasonably secure, whereas for Forager, intervention and disruption by Japanese air and naval forces was anticipated. Not only did the forces ashore have to be supplied, but a fleet of warships had to be maintained at sea for up to four months. Plans for the assault also had to be coordinated with those for base development, as this was the overall objective of the campaign.

The first objective in Operation Forager was the occupation of Saipan, which commenced on 15 June 1944, after a two-day naval bombardment, around the same time the Allies were invading France in Operation Overlord. The 2nd Marine Division, 4th Marine Division, and the Army's 27th Infantry Division engaged in costly fighting before the island was declared secure on 9 July. In addition to the fighting on land, there was a naval battle, the Battle of the Philippine Sea, on 19-20 June. On 24 July 1944, the 4th Marine Division landed on nearby Tinian, supported by aerial and naval bombardment and the guns of the XXIV Corps Artillery, firing across the strait from Saipan. Instead of landing in the southwest, the Marines landed on the northwest coast, where two very small beaches were lightly defended. The island was declared secure on 1 August, but mopping-up operations continued until 1 January 1945.

The assault on Guam was originally scheduled for 18 June, just three days after the landing on Saipan. The Battle of the Philippine Sea and stubborn resistance by the unexpectedly large Japanese garrison on Saipan led to the invasion being postponed for over a month to allow the Army's 77th Infantry Division to be brought in from Hawaii. American forces landed on Guam on 21 July, and on 10 August organized Japanese resistance was declared ended, though as many as 10,000 Japanese soldiers were still at large.

== Naval logistics ==
By using up the most perishable stores first, a ship's supply officer could maintain a warship at sea for up to two months, but Operation Forager required the fast carrier task groups to be at sea for more than four. The ship's stores therefore had to be replenished by general stores issue ships (AKSs). The ships of the fleet carried about 40,000 different items, but the AKSs carried only the 5,000 most urgent stores.

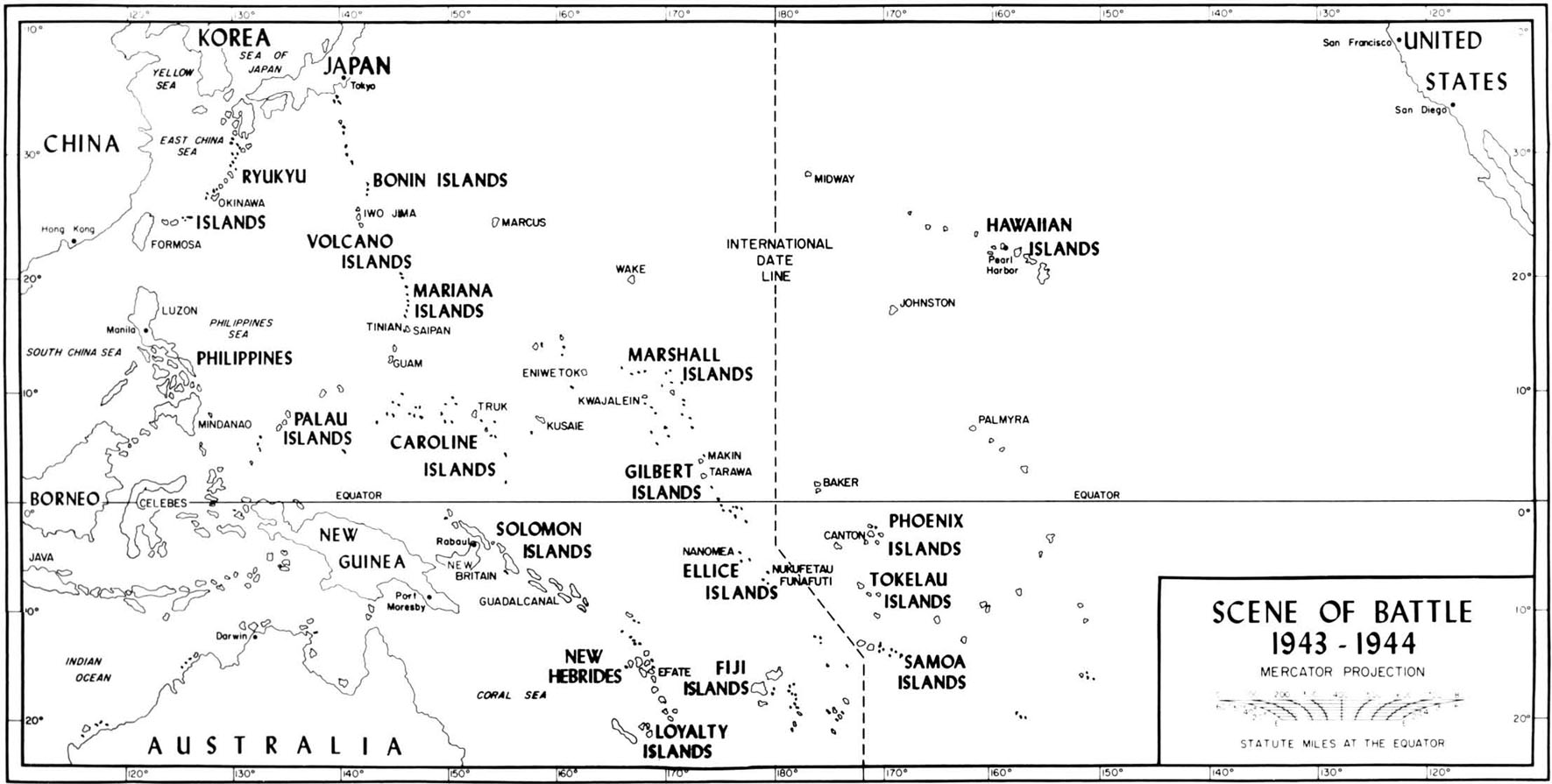
Pacific Theater of World War II 1943-1944

=== Shipping ===
The provision of shipping to maintain the force was a critical problem. A staff study estimated this would require 120 cargo ships and 58 troop transports, of which only 18 and 22 respectively were on hand in April 1944. For the invasion of Saipan, 110 transport vessels were available. (Note: The transport fleet consisted of 37 attack transports (APA) and troop transports (AP); 11 attack cargo ships (AKA) and cargo ships (AK); 5 dock landing ships (LSD); 47 tank landing ships (LST); and 10 high-speed transports (APD).) They carried 74,986.6 measurement tons (84,935.4 m^{3}) of cargo. Staging areas were widely separated; the 2nd Marine Division loaded at Hilo on the island of Hawaii; the 4th Marine Division at Kahului on Maui, and the 27th Infantry Division on Oahu. All the combatant ships involved in the operation were American, as were all but three auxiliary ships: there were two Dutch merchant vessels and a Norwegian whaler factory ship converted for use as an oil tanker. The Northern attack force for Saipan and Tinian consisted of 71,034 soldiers, sailors and marines; the Southern Attack Force for Guam, of 56,537. In addiation, there were 9,250 troops for the Guam garison, 23,616 for Saipan and 5,235 for Tinian. Thus, 165,672 troops were embarked.

Combat loading, in which the most urgently required cargo was stowed in ships' holds so as to be immediately accessible, was favored for ships carrying assault troops, but was not always possible due to the shortage of shipping. Some units of the V Amphibious Corps and the XXIV Corps Artillery found themselves traveling separately from their unit equipment, a highly undesirable scenario in a combat zone, but fully combat loading the entire force would have meant leaving up to 35 percent of their equipment behind. Even then, there was insufficient cargo space, and the V Amphibious Corps was forced to make cuts to unit equipment. This fell most heavily on transport, which was bulky. Only 94 percent of ambulances, 83 percent of trucks, 71 percent of trailers and 75 percent of tractors could be taken to Saipan.

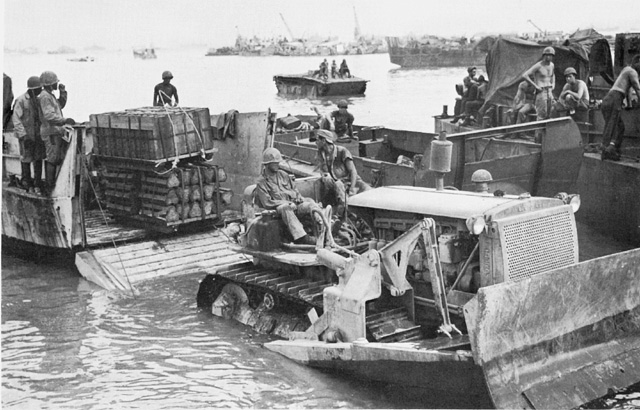
Unloading ammunition on pallets from an LCM

This was partially offset by the allocation of 185 DUKWs. Each division had a DUKW company: the 1st Amphibian Truck Company for the 2nd Marine Division, the 2nd Amphibian Truck Company for the 4th Marine Division, and a provisional amphibian truck company for the 27th Infantry Division. In addition, the 477th Amphibian Truck Company was attached to the XXIV Corps Artillery. For Guam, the 3rd Marine Division and the 1st Provisional Marine Brigade shared the III Amphibious Corps Motor Transport Battalion, with its Company C assigned to the brigade. When a typhoon struck on 29 July, an LST broached and Landing Vehicles, Tracked, (LVTs) and landing craft were unable to operate, but the DUKWs proved more seaworthy, and they were able to continue delivering supplies.

The V Amphibious Corps Headquarters ordered that 25 to 50 percent of all supplies and two to five units of fire of ammunition be loaded on pallets. This order was embraced by the 27th Infantry Division, which put between 80 and 90 percent of its supplies on pallets, but the 2nd and 4th Marine Divisions were less enthusiastic about the idea. The former put no more than 25 percent of its supplies on pallets, and the latter only palletized 10 to 15 percent. The 3rd Marine Division and the 1st Provisional Marine Brigade did not put any of their supplies on pallets, but the 77th Infantry Division complied with the directive and constructed more than 5,000 4-by-6-foot (1.2 by 1.8 m) wooden pallets, although about 1,000 pallet loads were broken up because they did not fit into the available cargo space or because a ship lacked the equipment to handle pallets.

On Smith's recommendation, resupply ships sailing from the United States were "block loaded", with a mixture of common stores. This proved not only to be inefficient in the use of cargo space, but presented difficulty in unloading, as each type of supply had to be completely unloaded before the next could be accessed. In his evaluation, Turner recommended the Navy revert to commodity loading, where each ship carried a particular type, which facilitated selective unloading of stores.

=== Food and water ===
The Southern Attack Force was mounted from the South Pacific Area, so most of its initial complement of fresh provisions came from New Zealand, while those for the Northern Attack Force, destined for the assaults on Saipan and Tinian, came from Hawaii and the West Coast of the United States. Once the operation was under way, resupply was from the West Coast through the bases in Hawaii, and on Majuro, Kwajalein and Eniwetok. Rations for Army units were drawn from Army stocks while those for the Navy and Marine Corps came from Navy stocks. Resupply directly from the United States was necessary because the base facilities in Hawaii were insufficient to handle the volume of supplies required for mounting simultaneous operations against Saipan and Guam. Ships returning from the forward areas to supply points transferred excess stores not required for the return voyage to other vessels.

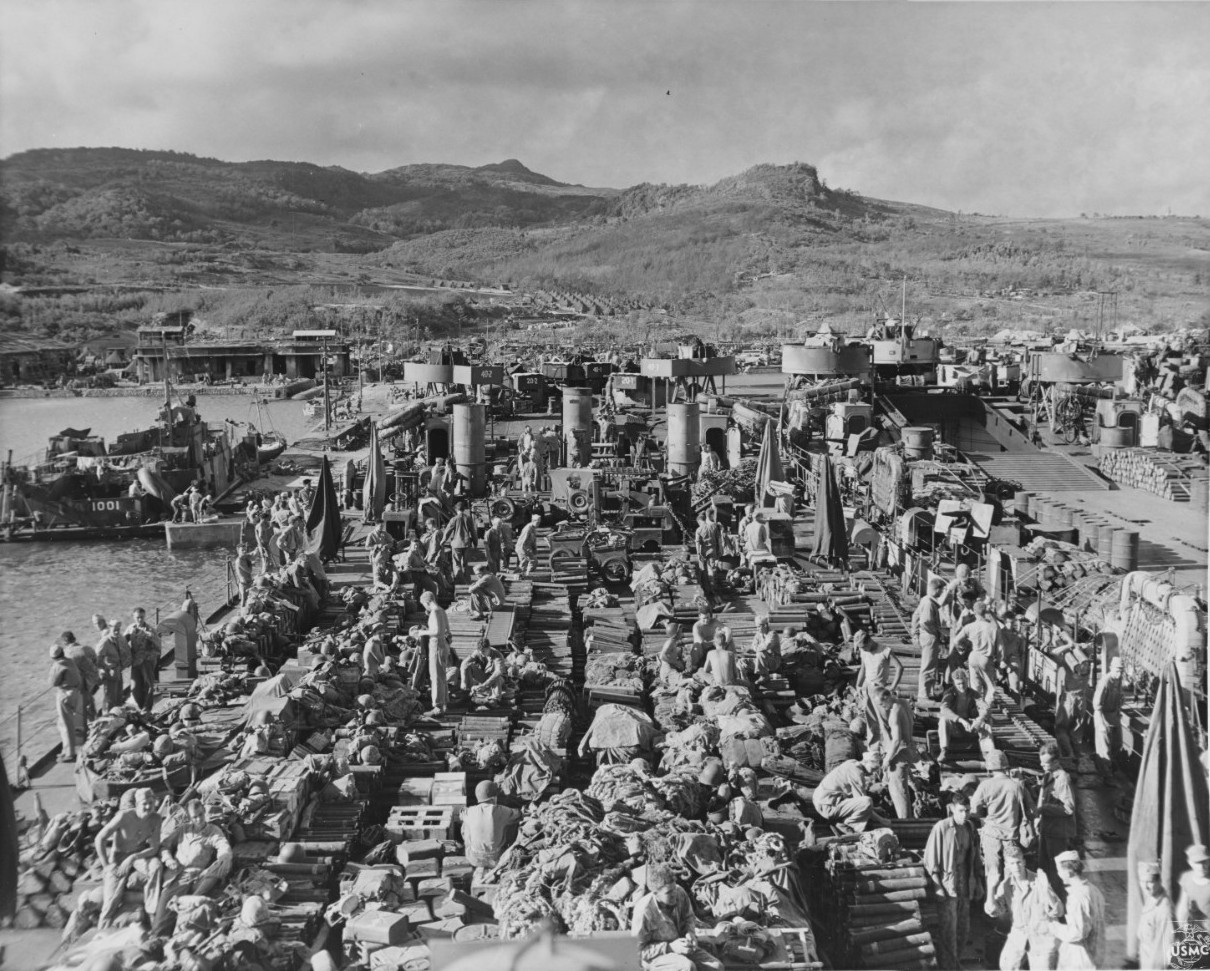
Marines load supplies aboard two LSTs in preparation for the assault on Tinian

The supply of fresh produce depended on the availability of reefer ships, cargo ships with refrigerated holds. These were specially designed to carry a mixture of fresh and dry provisions, and to permit selective discharge of a balanced cargo so one ship after another could be revictualed without having to unload the reefer's cargo and re-stow it. The Service Force had nine reefers, as the majority of the Navy's reefers were serving with the Atlantic Fleet. The Pacific Fleet's reefers were therefore supplemented by ships of the War Shipping Administration. These were large 5,000-gross-register-ton (14,000 m^{3}) vessels with Merchant Marine crews that could carry up to 348,000 feet (106,000 m) of refrigerated produce, enough for 30 days' supply for 90,000 soldiers; but their holds and hatches were not organised for selective discharge, so they had to unload into warehouses, and Saipan had no such facilities until 15 August. Nonetheless, during Operation Forager, the Service Force managed to supply fresh produce to all combatant ships on five days out of six, and to the forces ashore for one day in three.

Until water supplies could be secured ashore, arrangements were made for transports, LSTs and large warships to provide water to smaller vessels lacking sufficient storage. Water ran low when these ships started to leave, and bad weather sometimes prevented resupply from those that remained. The 77th Infantry Division took with it 190,000 US gallons (720,000 L) of potable water in 5-US-gallon (19 L; 4.2 imp gal) jerrycans and 55-US-gallon (210 L; 46 imp gal) drums. Each shore party engineer battalion had two distillation units. The division moved six of them to Pago Bay to keep forward units in northern Guam supplied, and managed to capture the well at the village of Barrigada intact, which could supply 30,000 US gallons (110,000 L) per day.

=== Fuel ===
Although the carrier task groups cruised the Philippine Sea at an economical speed of 14 to 16 knots (26 to 30 km/h) when not in action, Japanese air and surface forces were active. Calm seas also required the carriers to make speed to launch and recover aircraft. As a result, fuel expenditure during Operation Forager was 43 percent higher than the planners had estimated. Despite this, no ship or aircraft operations had to be curtailed due to a shortage of fuel.

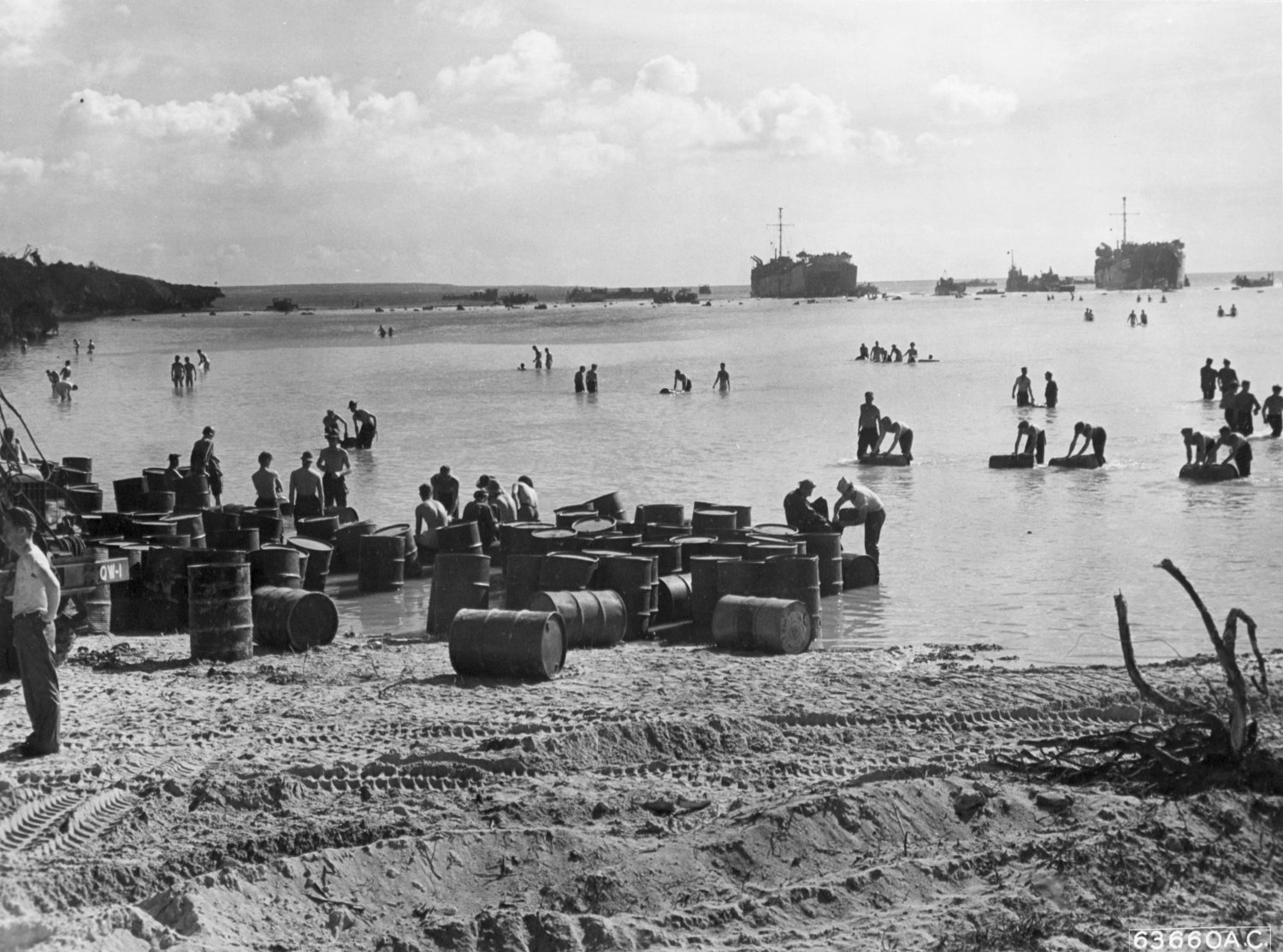
USS LST-205 beached on a reef along with two other LSTs during landing operations on Saipan on 21 June 1944. Men of the Army's 804th Engineer Aviation Battalion roll floating gasoline drums from the ship to shore.

Fleet oilers were under the command of Commodore Augustus (Gus) H. Gray, the commander of Service Squadron 8. Captain Burton B. Biggs, an experienced logistics officer on Spruance's staff, planned and then directed fueling operations. Biggs estimated Operation Forager would require 100,000 barrels (16,000 m^{3}) per day, roughly the capacity of a single oiler. Eight task units were organized, designated Task Units 16.7.1 to 16.7.8, each of which had three oilers escorted by at least two destroyers or destroyer escorts.

The oilers were dispatched to designated refueling areas, 75-by-25-mile (121 by 40 km) rectangles of open ocean; eleven were designated for Operation Forager, each named after a well-known oil company. In accordance with a timetable, or occasionally when there was a special need for more fuel, ships would leave their task groups and rendezvous with the oilers to be refueled at sea. When they had less than 20,000 barrels (3,200,000 L), oilers returned to Eniwetok , where they were refilled by commercial tankers. In July, tankers brought 4,495,156 barrels (714,672,700 L) of fuel oil, 8 million US gallons (30 ML) of avgas and 275,000 barrels (43,700,000 L) of diesel oil to Majuro, Kwajalein and Eniwetok. About three quarters of this came from the refineries in Curacao and Aruba in the Dutch West Indies.

On 18 June, the oilers USS Saranac, Neshanic and Saugatuck were refueling four destroyers and destroyer escorts when they came under attack from five bombers, the first time the Japanese had targeted oilers in the Central Pacific. All three were hit. Saranac had eight killed and twenty-two wounded and was so badly damaged it had to return to Eniwetok and then to San Pedro, California, for repairs. A bomb exploded among gasoline drums on Neshanic's deck, setting off a major fire that was extinguished by its damage control party. Neshanic and Saugatuck were repaired at Eniwetok.

=== Ammunition ===
Ammunition usage is less predictable than food or fuel, but orders had to be placed with the depots months in advance. Fleet and aircraft ammunition was then brought forward by the ammunition ships USS Lassen, Rainier, Shasta, Mauna Loa, Mazama and Sangay, which replenished warships at Eniwetok lagoon from 15 June on. Because the Pacific Ocean Area had only six ammunition ships, the LSD USS Ashland was pressed into service to deliver ammunition, as were twenty-six LSTs. Six Victory ships were chartered from the War Shipping Administration to haul ammunition, the first of which arrived off Saipan on 30 June. They were loaded on the West Coast with a mix of ammunition in such a way as to permit optional discharge, whereby any particular ammunition could be retrieved without having to remove layers of unwanted other types. This was the first time this had been tried with merchant ships, and it was risky because there was a shortage of crewmen trained in the proper handling of explosives.

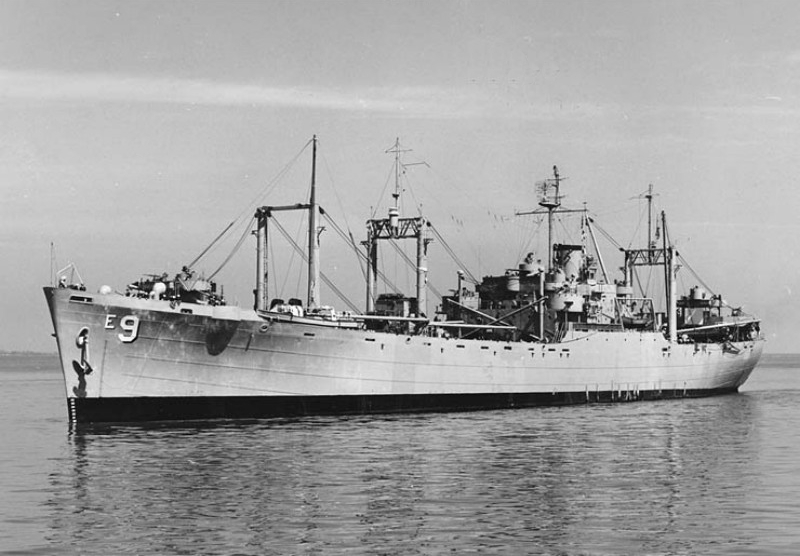
Ammunition ship Mazama

The risk involved in using untrained personnel to handle explosives was demonstrated by an incident at Pearl Harbor. Sixteen LSTs were designated to each carry 750 rounds of 5-inch/38-caliber gun anti-aircraft ammunition and ten more were designated to each carry 270 4.5-inch rockets, 6,000 rounds of 40 mm and 15,000 rounds of 20 mm anti-aircraft ammunition. On 21 May, as mortar rounds were being transferred to LST-353 by the African-American 29th Chemical Decontamination Company, a round exploded. In the resulting fires and secondary explosions, six LSTs and three LCTs were lost. The West Loch Disaster cost the lives of at least 163 men; another 396 were injured, but loading and embarkation was delayed by only one day. Six LSTs originally earmarked to carry the garrison troops were substituted for the ones lost. The LSTs departed Pearl Harbor on 25 May and made up the lost day en route.

USS New Mexico replenishes her ammunition supply prior to the invasion of Guam

The Battle of the Philippine Sea and staunch Japanese resistance ashore resulted in a longer campaign than anticipated, with increased calls for naval gunfire support, and consequently prodigious ammunition consumption. Not long after the fighting began on Saipan, it became apparent the supply of certain types of ammunition, notably 6-inch high capacity (HC), 5-inch anti-aircraft common (AAC) and star shell, would soon be exhausted. Out of a total of 106,110 shells (8,429.6 short tons (7,647.2 t)) fired during the liberation of Guam, 5,039 were star shells. The higher than expected expenditure of ammunition ashore was exacerbated by the early commitment of the 27th Infantry Division to the fighting on Saipan, which meant three rather than two divisions were consuming ammunition at a high rate. The allocation of seven units of fire, which was based on previous campaigns in the Central Pacific, proved to be too low, and it was recommended ten be taken in future operations. The problem was not restricted to ammunition: signal units brought twenty days' supply of batteries, but found this was not enough for twenty days' combat on Saipan.

Most resupply ships were not vertically loaded, which made retrieving the most urgently needed ammunition more problematic. As Mazama was loaded with the types most needed, she was called forward to replenish the fleet off Saipan while the battle still raged on shore, a risky action, as Japanese air attacks occurred almost every day. Between 21 June and 7 July, when she returned to Eniwetok, Mazama discharged 3,448 short tons (3,128 t) of ammunition.

=== Aircraft ===
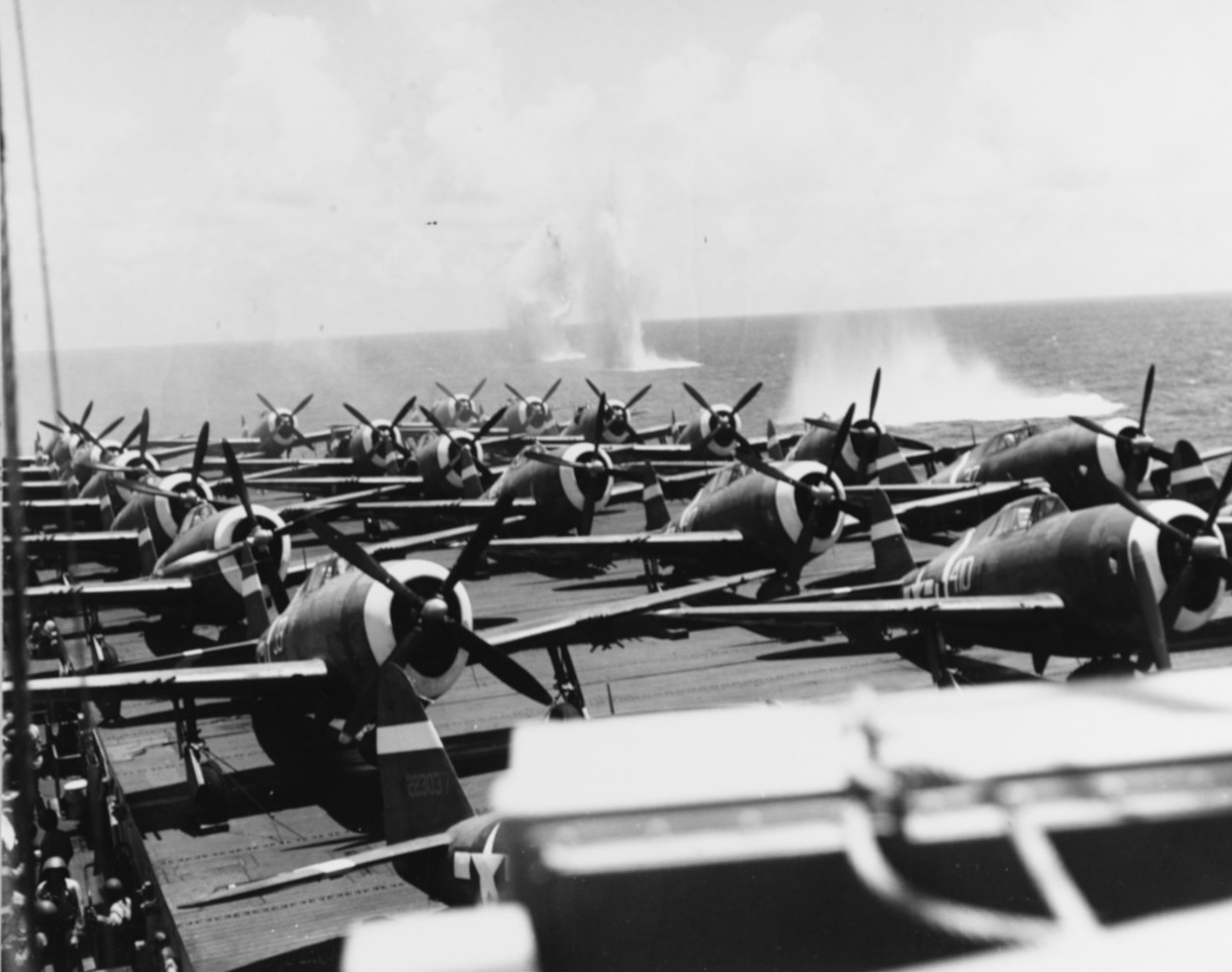
USS Manila Bay under attack by four Japanese "Zeke" aircraft off Saipan on 23 June 1944. The deck is loaded with Republic P-47 Thunderbolt fighters for delivery to airfields on Saipan.

Replacement aircraft were brought out by four escort carriers. Two, USS Copahee and Breton, carried naval aircraft, while USS Manila Bay and Natoma Bay brought twenty-two U.S. Army Republic P-47 Thunderbolt fighters of the 19th Fighter Squadron. These were catapulted from the escort carriers on 22 June and landed on Isely Field on Saipan, where they were based for the rest of the campaign. Although the escort carriers were designed to operate no more than twenty-four aircraft, various innovations allowed them to carry many more.

For Operation Forager, Copahee took on 61 aircraft: 25 fighters, 15 torpedo bombers and 21 dive bombers. She left Pearl Harbor on 3 June with the oiler group. On 14 June, she delivered four fighters and a torpedo bomber to USS Cowpens; a fighter, a torpedo bomber and three dive bombers to USS Hornet; four fighters to USS Bataan; five fighters, five torpedo bombers and seven fighters to USS Yorktown; and four fighters and two torpedo bombers to USS Belleau Wood. In exchange, Copahee received flyable duds, aircraft capable of taking off and landing, but for one reason or another not capable of combat operations. During Operation Forager, Copahee shuttled back and forth between the Marianas and Eniwetok. On 7 July, she took back captured Japanese aircraft. Spare parts for aircraft were carried aboard USS Fortune.

=== Salvage ===
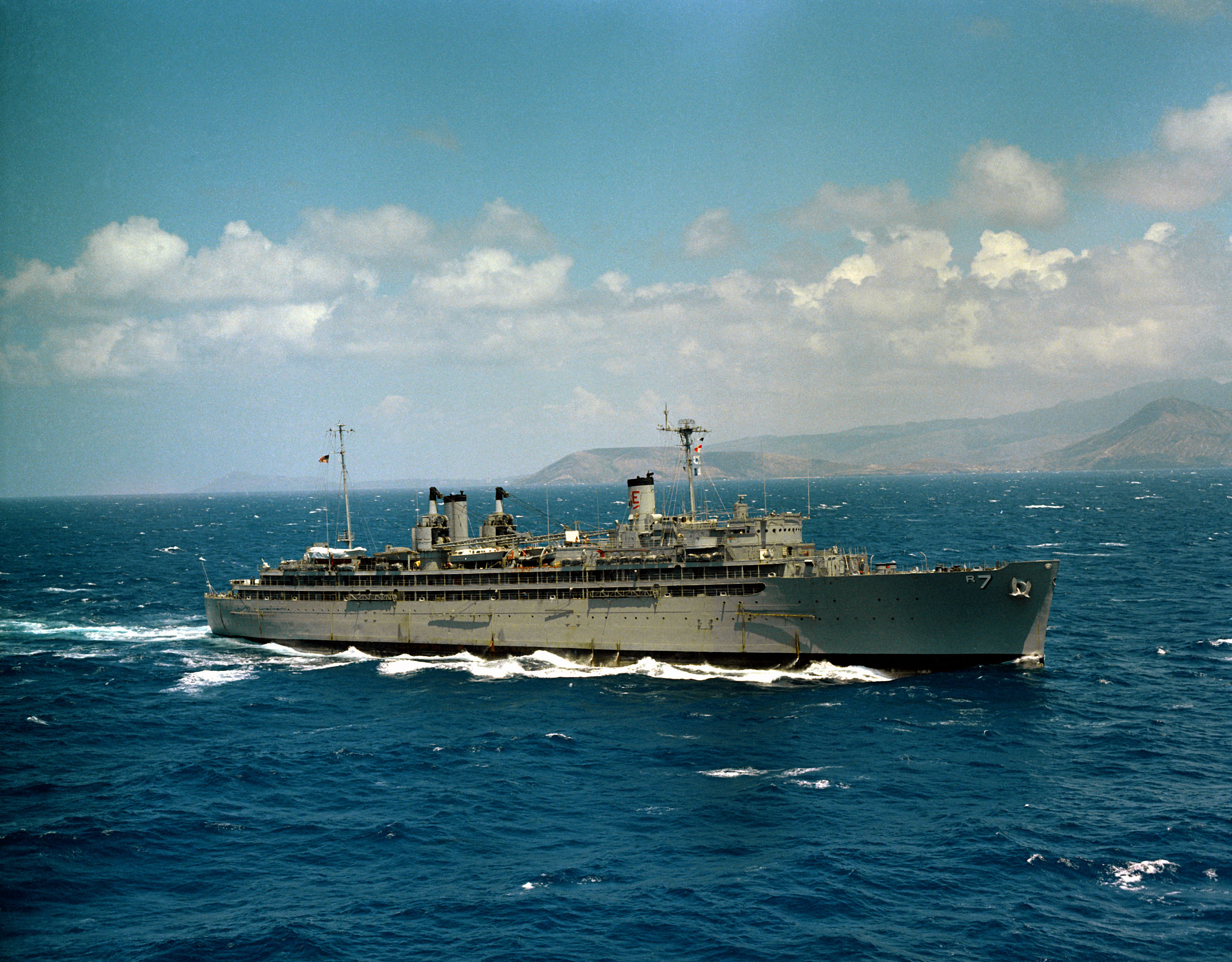
Repair ship USS Hector

Six fleet tugs accompanied the expeditionary force for towing and fire fighting, along with two salvage vessels; two more were assigned to Service Squadron 12 for harbor clearance. Two repair ships for landing craft, USS Egeria and Agenor, accompanied the expeditionary force. Battle damage to warships was addressed by the repair ships of Service Squadron 10 at Eniwetok.

Service Squadron 10 was commanded by Commodore Worrall Reed Carter, who flew his pennant from the destroyer tender USS Prairie. The squadron's ships included the repair ships USS Vestal, Ajax, Hector and Luzon; destroyer tenders USS Piedmont, Cascade and Markab; landing craft repair ship Egeria; floating dry docks ARD-13, ARD-15 and AFD-15; and floating workshop YR-30.

A major salvage effort began on 21 July when the SS Sea Flyer ran aground at Eniwetok. The ship's 1,900 long tons (1,900 t) cargo had to be unloaded before she could be refloated and tugboats could tow her clear on 28 July.

=== Medical ===
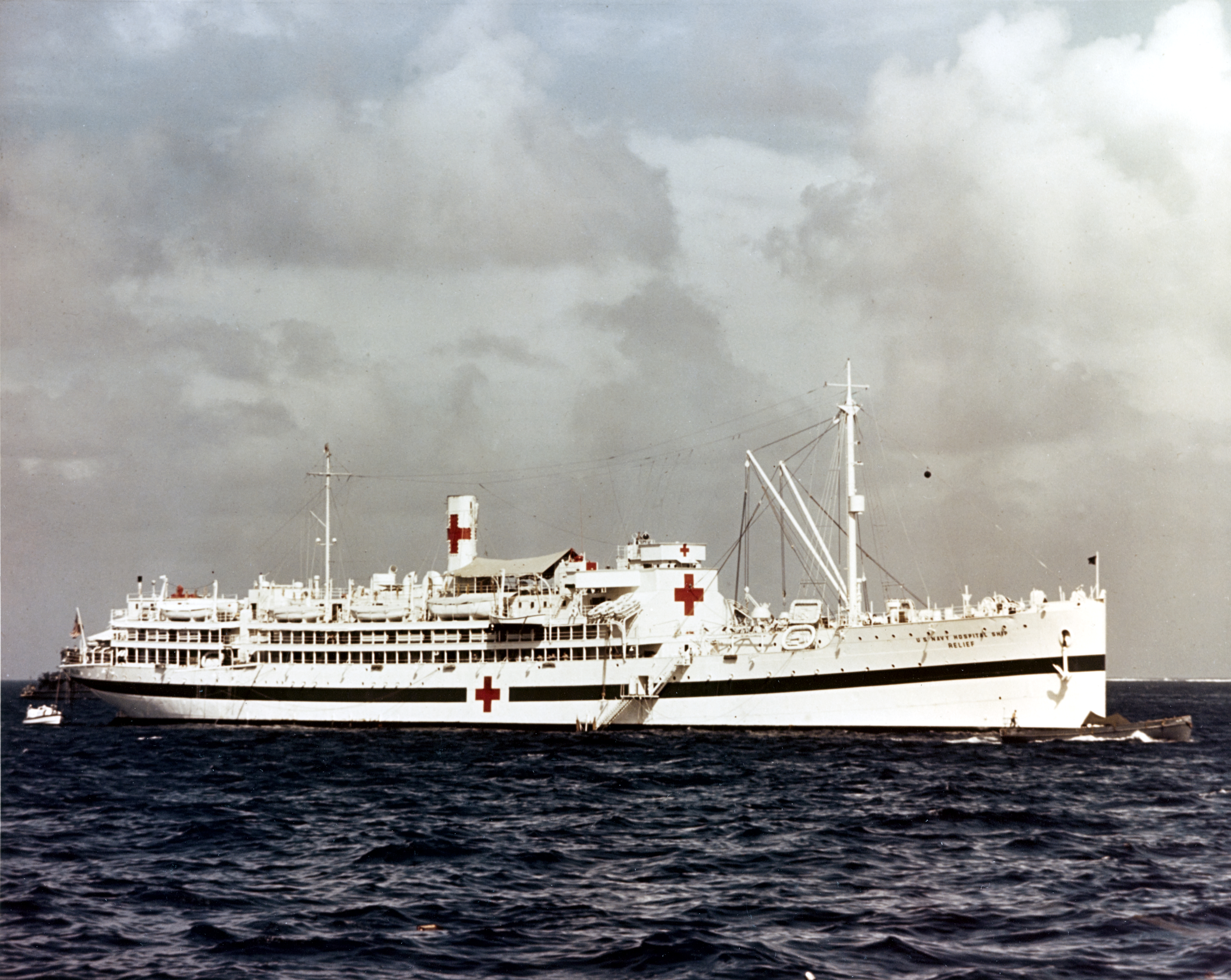
Hospital ship USS Relief

Medical supplies were carried in general stores ships. Four hospital ships participated in Operation Forager: USS Relief, Solace, Bountiful and Samaritan. The transports USS Rixey, Wharton and Tryon took walking wounded who required no more than two weeks' hospitalization. Three LSTs were specially equipped as makeshift hospital ships and handled 1,549 casualties on 15 June. Bountiful and Solace arrived off Saipan on 18 June and embarked 1,099 casualties. By 20 June, Solace was at full capacity with 584 cases on board and sailed for hospitals on Guadalcanal. She returned to Saipan on 3 July, and took on 562 patients by the afternoon of 5 July, when she sailed to the Russell Islands to transfer them to Fleet Hospital 110 and the Army's 222nd Station Hospital. She then sailed for Guam via Eniwetok, where she refueled, and arrived at Agana Bay on 24 July to take 585 cases to Kwajalein. Relief and Samaritan took 1,355 casualties on board on 23 June. On her second voyage to Saipan, Relief embarked 685, of whom 284 were wounded Japanese. Seaplanes from VH-1 performed emergency evacuation of casualties to the Marshall Islands. Air evacuation from Isely Field commenced on 24 June, and 860 casualties were flown to the Marshall Islands during Operation Forager.

== Ship-to-shore ==
Each transport division consisted of four APAs and an attack cargo ship (AKA). Each transport carried up to 1,500 troops, so a transport division could carry a regimental combat team. (Note: A regimental combat team (RCT) was an infantry regiment augmented with service and support elements usually allocated within the division to support the regiment. With such augmentation, an RCT was capable of independent action and operations.) Three transport divisions were required to lift an infantry or marine division, with another four APAs and four AKAs for corps troops. The landings in the Marianas required LVTs to carry troops across the reefs. Their value had been demonstrated in the Battle of Tarawa. They were carried in Landing Ships, Tank, (LST). The LVTs were able to cross the reef and disembark their troops on the beach.

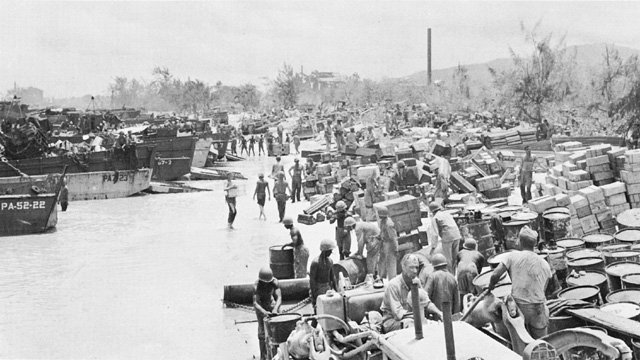
Shore Party on Blue Beach 1, Saipan

Only the first waves of infantry were in LVTs; succeeding waves arrived in assault transports and were loaded onto Landing Craft, Vehicle, Personnel, (LCVPs) carried by the assault transports. The LCVPs carried the troops to the reef, where they transferred to LVTs. Tanks were carried in LSDs. Each LSD carried twenty medium tanks, loaded in an LCT and fourteen Landing Craft, Mechanized (LCMs). Eight LSTs were required to carry the Marines' divisional artillery for the assault on Saipan. The 105 mm howitzers were carried in DUKWs (amphibious trucks) while LVTs brought the 75 mm pack howitzers from the reefs. Once the situation ashore stabilized, LSTs could nose up to the reef and discharge vehicles and supplies directly onto it. Six LSTs carried four pontoon barges each, six carried two pontoon causeway sections, and thirty carried an LCT.

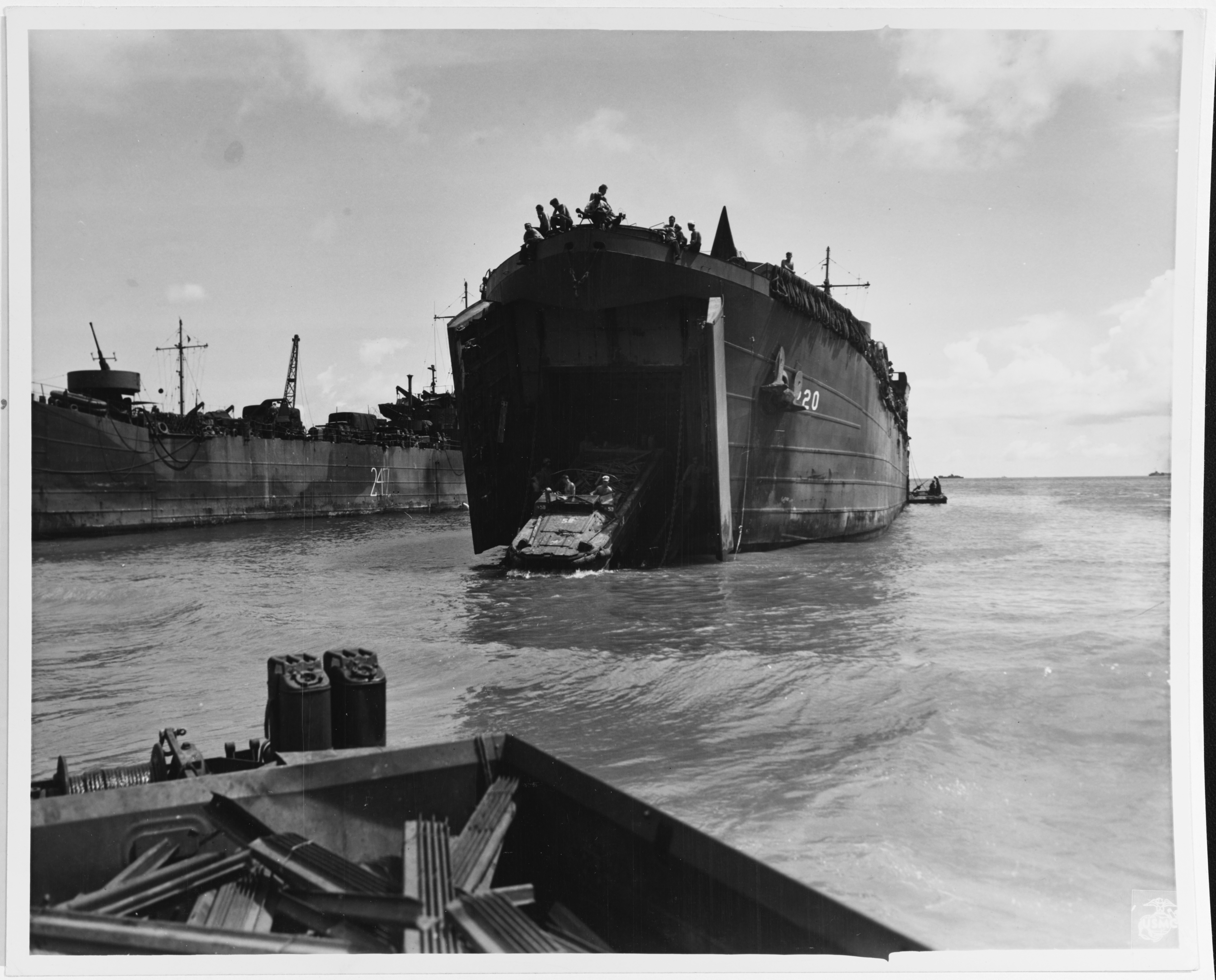
A DUKW drives down the ramp of USS LST-220 during re-supply operations on Guam

While the troops could move inland under their own power, supplies could not, and had to remain on the beach until the shore party could sort them and transport became available to move them to inland dumps. Supplies therefore piled up on the beaches. On Saipan, hydrographic conditions were not conducive to a steady flow of supplies over the beaches. The beaches were under mortar and artillery fire for the first four days, which created further disruption as unloading activity was suspended while the shore parties sought cover. The appearance of the Japanese fleet caused the transports to move out to sea on each of the first three nights, and they left the area completely on the next five days and nights while they awaited the outcome of the Battle of the Philippine Sea.

Naval beach parties marked the beaches and supervised the unloading of stores from the ships and their movement to the shoreline. These were under the control of the naval beachmasters. Each assault division had a transport group beachmaster, and each transport group beachmaster had two transport division beachmasters, one for each assault regiment. Each division had a shore party working in cooperation with the beachmasters. Marine divisions were authorized to have a shore party of 98 officers and 2,781 enlisted; that of the 2nd Marine Division was built around its pioneer battalion, whereas that of the 4th Marine Division was built around the 121st Naval Construction Battalion. Each regiment of the 27th Infantry Division had an engineer battalion functioning as its shore party: the 34th, 152nd and 1341st Engineer Combat Battalions of the 1165th Engineer Combat Group.

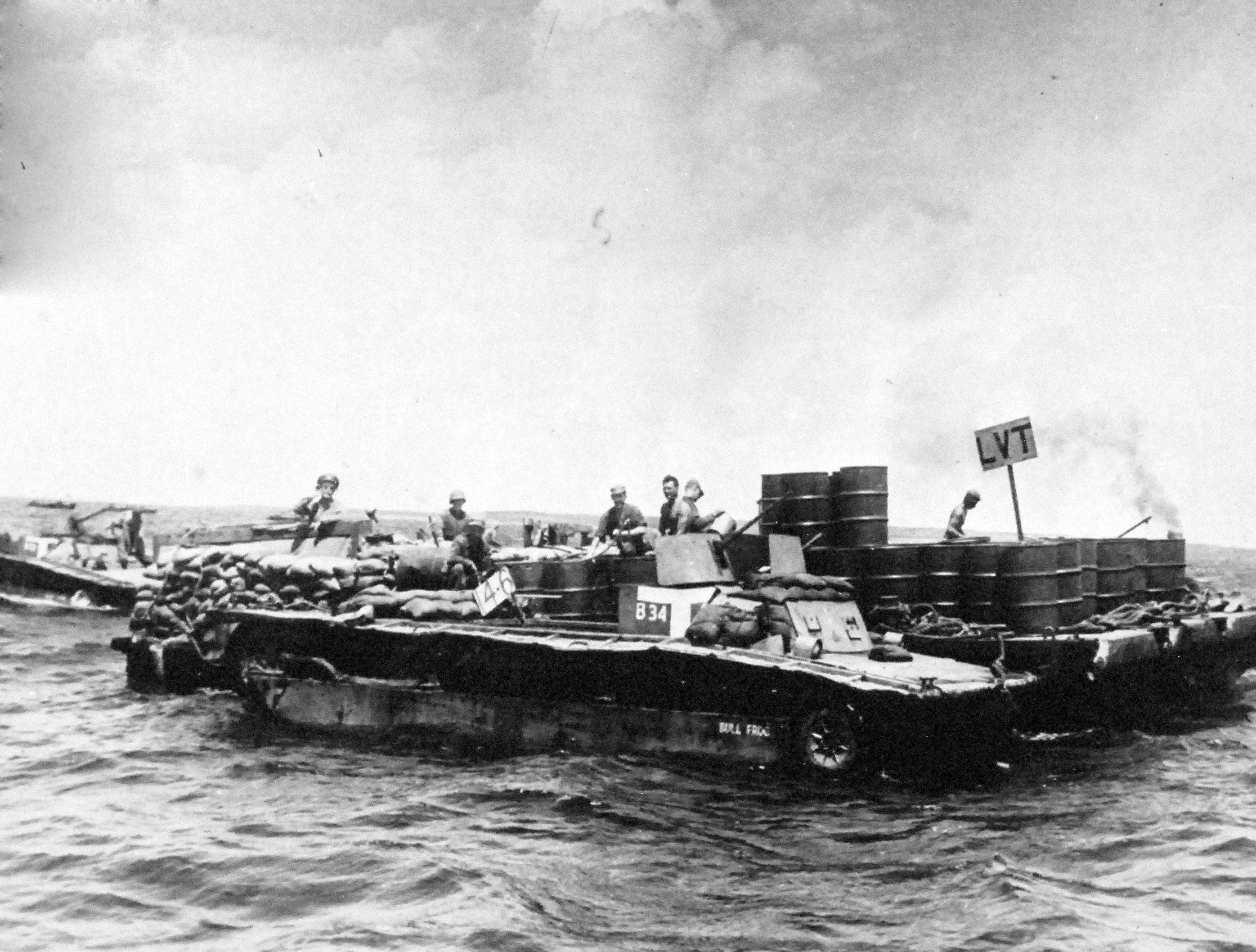
Floating refueling point off Tinian

On Saipan, supplies intended for the 2nd Marine Division were often dumped on the 4th Marine Division's beaches and vice versa, but the situation deteriorated further when the 27th Infantry Division was called forward from floating reserve. Plans had not been made for it to land in the 4th Marine Division area, and the beachmaster would not agree to land all of its supplies on a single beach. As a result, its supplies were landed on several beaches. When the transports retired on 18 June, the division was left with four days' supply of small arms ammunition and just 600 rounds of 155 mm howitzer and 1,200 rounds of 105 mm ammunition per battalion. Only three of its 2½-ton 6×6 trucks had landed, although it still had forty-nine DUKWs. The 27th Infantry Division's supplies were not fully unloaded until 27 June. The handling of its supplies was greatly eased, though, by the large proportion that arrived on pallets.

The 77th Infantry Division's experience with pallets was less successful because the beaches on Guam lay beyond a coral reef. Cranes were required to load the pallets, and these were not always available, so many pallet loads were broken up so supplies could be manhandled to transfer points. Landing craft and landing ships could not come closer than the reef, several hundred yards from the beach, and the loss of twenty-four LVTs to Japanese fire in the initial assault was sorely felt. A layer of silt on the shore side of the reef caused DUKWs and LVTs to become bogged, slowing things down. Rubber raft causeways and ships' life rafts were used as expedients to get the needed supplies ashore.

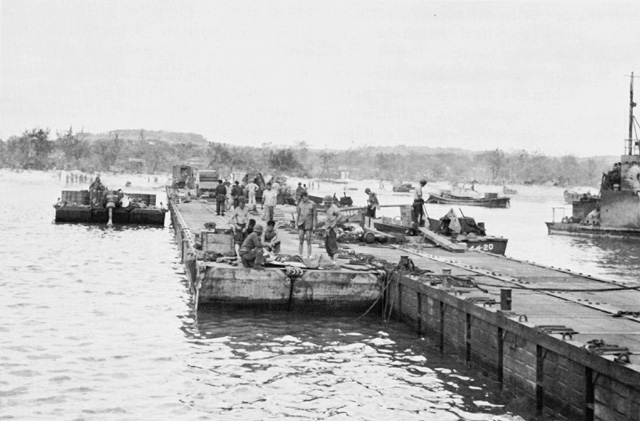
Supplies are unloaded over a pontoon causeway and barge in Charan Kanoa Harbor

Cranes were used to shift supplies in cargo nets from landing craft to LVTs and DUKWs. Unlike the northern beaches on Guam, where some cranes were set up on the reef, all the cranes on the southern beaches had to be mounted on barges, with cargo transferred in deep water. Although an additional 25 mobile cranes were provided to the Marines, there were still insufficient numbers for the multiple transfers required at the reef, beach and dumps. The Navy assisted the forces ashore by continuing unloading operations through the night under lights with the aid of the Army shore parties' 5 KW generators. The Marine pioneer battalions were less well-equipped than their Army counterparts with lighting required for round-the-clock beach operations, and some units had antiquated equipment with batteries that failed, but the Army shore parties had sufficient lights to meet the requirements of all the beaches.

About one-fifth of the total strength of III Amphibious Corps was engaged in unloading activities. The 1st Provisional Marine Brigade initially had 1,070 troops on board ship and 1,800 on the reef and beaches engaged in unloading work. The 77th Infantry Division, with three battalions of shore party engineers and 270 garrison troops with low landing priorities, employed 583 soldiers unloading ships and 1,828 working ashore. The Marines used a unit called the 1st Provisional Replacement Company to provide shore party labor in the early stages of the landing on Guam when the demand for labor was at its highest. After the initial flood of supplies ashore, unloading work became more organized and routine, and the personnel of the 1st Provisional Replacement Company were fed into combat units to replace casualties. This concept proved sound, and provisional replacement battalions were employed in this manner in subsequent operations in the Pacific.

== Depots and dumps ashore ==
To provide the needs of units ashore, the Marines formed two new units for Operation Forager, the 5th and 7th Field Depots. The former supported the III Amphibious Corps on Guam and the latter the V Amphibious Corps on Saipan and Tinian. They repaired weapons and equipment, carried out salvage, and sorted, stockpiled and issued stores and ammunition. Potential supply dump locations identified beforehand from aerial photos that looked like open grassland were often found to be rice paddies, which were unsuitable. The 5th Field Depot on Guam was allocated a 100-acre (40 ha) site at the base of the Orote Peninsula, but it had been the site of heavy fighting and it had to first bury over a thousand Japanese bodies. A 1,000-man main camp was established with five smaller outlying camps. Six depot companies and two ammunition companies of African American marines were attached.

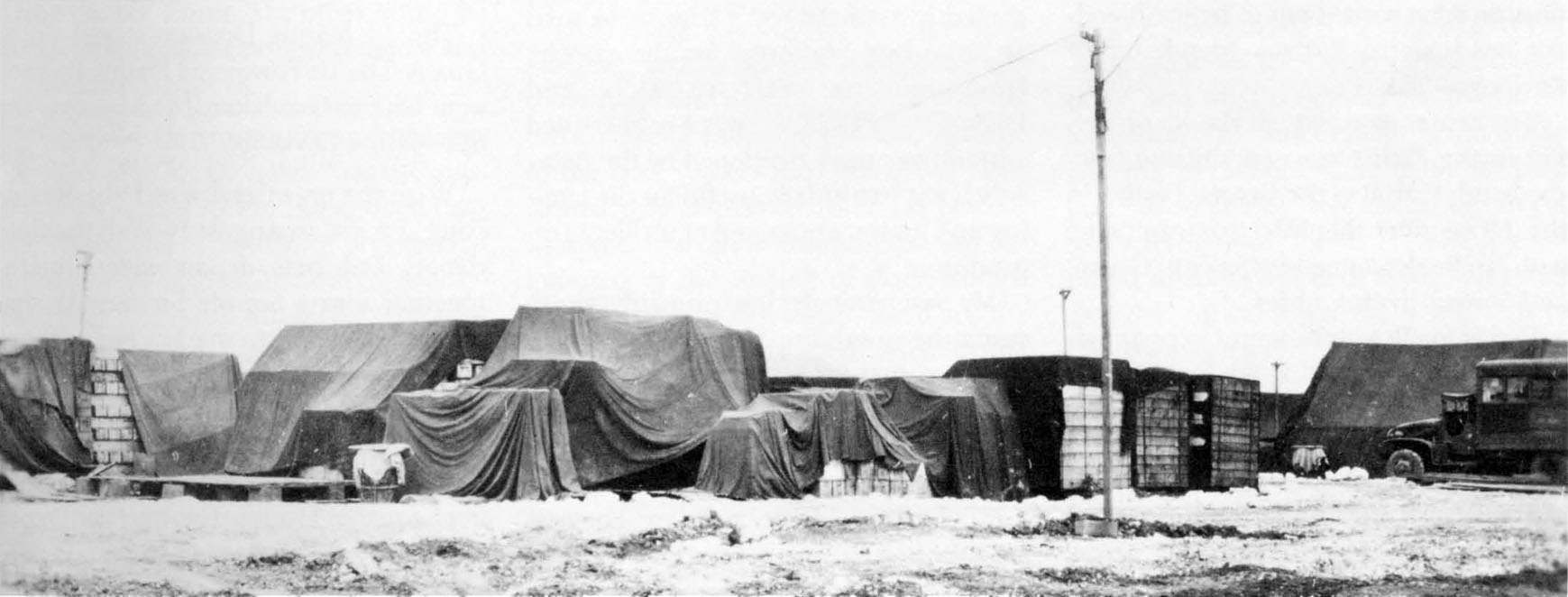
Weather-proofed ordnance storage of 5th Field Depot on Guam

As the ground units moved north on Guam, the impact of heavy rains and a shortage of bulldozers and graders to maintain the roads became evident, and there were insufficient trucks to maintain the target of five days' of supply in the forward dumps. The requirement to feed thousands of civilians had not been anticipated, and the reserves of rations were depleted below the desired ten days' of supply but did not run out. The 5th Field Depot was able to maintain twenty days' supply of most items but not all; while 20 days' supply of signal equipment was landed, this proved insufficient, and the supply of radio batteries ran out. The demand for fuel was also underestimated. The planners had reckoned that 400 drums per day would suffice but by 27 July 600 to 800 drums per day was being supplied by pontoon barges off Saipan and delivered to dumps by LVTs. A fuel shortage on Tinian was averted by the capture of Japanese stocks.

The Army's 9th Troop Carrier Squadron, based on Eniwetok, deployed its Douglas C-47 Skytrain aircraft to Saipan on 29 July in case air supply was required on Tinian. Rations and a few critical items were delivered by air. On the return trip to Saipan, the aircraft evacuated casualties.

== Base development ==
The purpose of Operation Forager was to capture the Mariana Islands in order to develop them as a base. Spruance ensured that plans for the assault phase were coordinated with those for base development. Although major air bases for heavy bombers were eventually established, priority was accorded to naval base installations, harbor facilities and staging areas for ground troops.

=== Saipan ===
The Seabees of the 18th and 121st Naval Construction Battalions with elements of 67th and 92nd Naval Construction Battalions landed on Saipan with the assault troops on 15 June 1944. Aslito Airfield was captured on 18 June. Holes were filled with crushed coral and the 4,500-foot (1,400 m) runway resurfaced with Marston Mat. By 21 June, it was widened to 200 feet (61 m). The Japanese gasoline storage blockhouses were still usable and were restocked by the Seabees. The Army's 804th Engineer Aviation Battalion then took over construction. The Army's 19th Fighter Squadron arrived on 22 June, followed over the next two days by the 73rd Fighter Squadron and a detachment of seven Northrop P-61 Black Widow night fighters from the 6th Night Fighter Squadron. The airfield was renamed Isely Field in honor of Commander Robert H. Isely, a naval aviator killed in the preliminary air strikes on the island, but over time a misspelling occurred, and it officially became Isley Field instead.

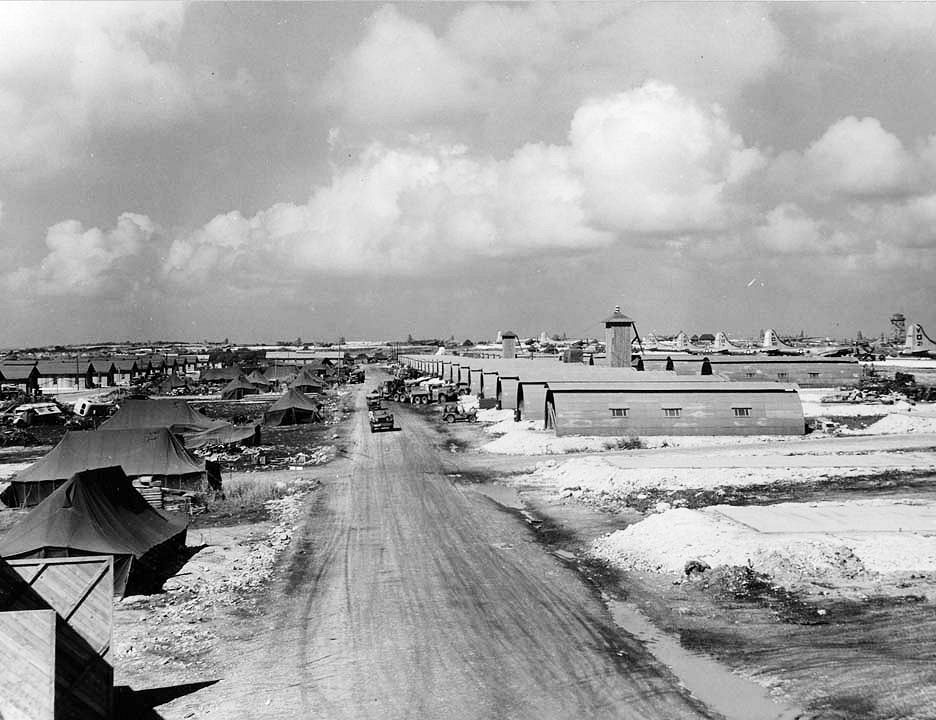
Isley Field in 1945

The Army's 1176th Construction Group, under the command of Colonel Brendan A. Burns, who doubled as garrison engineer, undertook the construction of a new 8,500-foot (2,600 m) asphalt-surfaced runway at Isley Field for Boeing B-29 Superfortress bombers. The new runway ran across the existing one, so in order to not interrupt fighter operations, work proceeded on the two ends of the runway, leaving the existing airstrip untouched. The topsoil was not deep, and underneath was coral rock that had to be removed by blasting, for which the 804th Engineer Aviation Battalion used about five tons of dynamite each day. Asphalt was produced at plants located near the field, and coral rock came from a quarry 2 miles (3.2 km) away. The engineers laid down a coral base 12 to 18 inches (30 to 46 cm) deep.

A second strip was begun to the northwest, but the difficulty encountered was so great it was only developed as a shorter, medium bomber strip. Another B-29 runway was constructed at Isley, parallel to the first. The first B-29 of the 73rd Bombardment Wing landed on Saipan on 12 October, before work on the first runway was completed. The second was in use by 15 December, but works at Isley were not completed until April 1945.

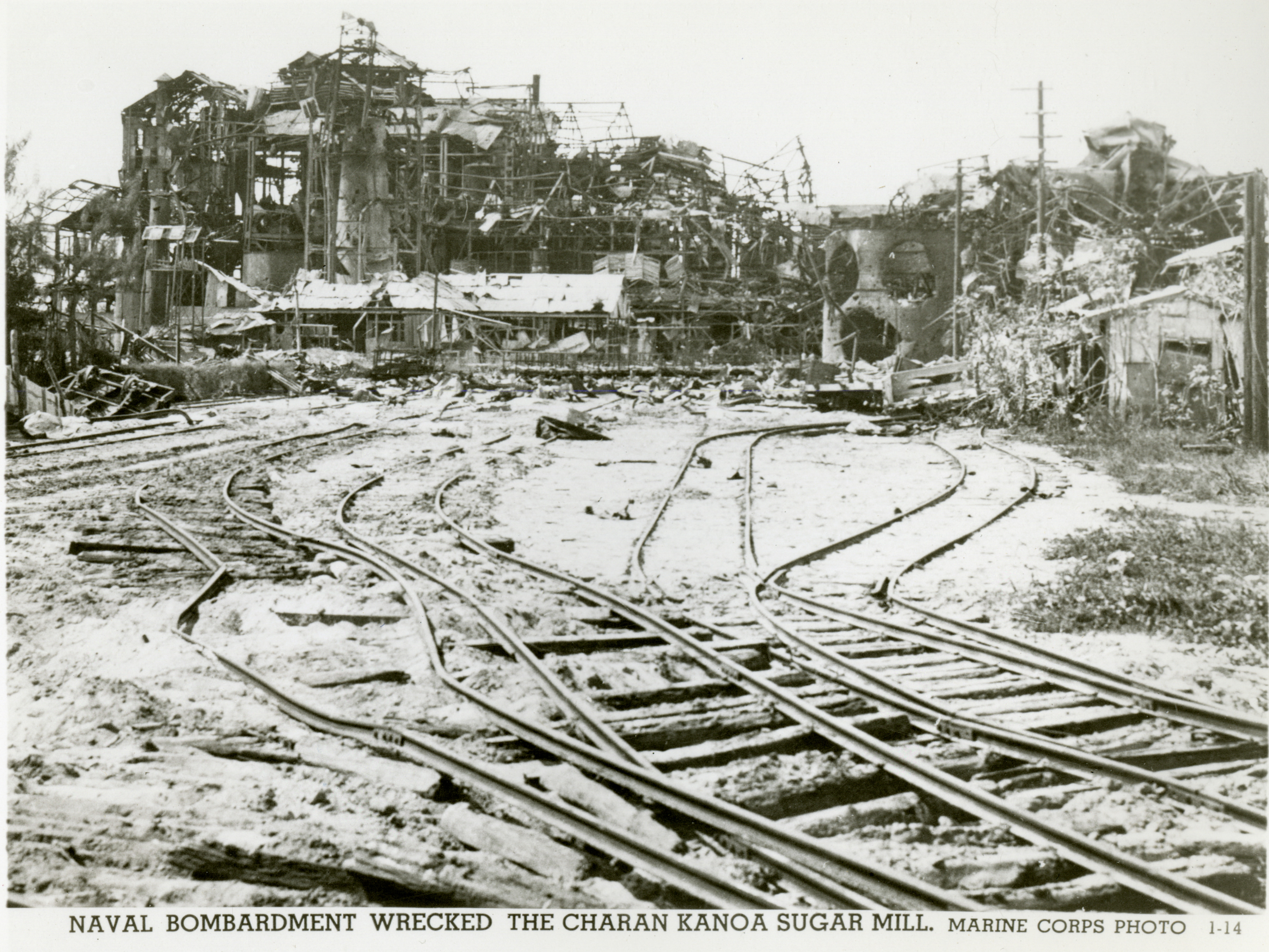
Charan Kanoa sugar mill and railroad tracks on Saipan, 16 June 1944

On 21 June, Seabees of the 121st Naval Construction Battalion began to repair the shell-damaged railroad tracks from Charan Kanoa to Aslito Airfield, and by 25 June supply trains were running. Other tracks in the area were also repaired. A diesel and three steam locomotives were repaired and put to use, along with a hundred flatcars. The railway, operated by the 1398th Engineer Construction Battalion, was carrying 350 ton-miles (510 tkm) per day by July. The tracks were subsequently ripped up and a road built on the right of way. Two of the locomotives were used to sterilize garbage cans. After the capture of Tanapag Harbor, the port was rehabilitated. The Army was responsible for building piers and cargo storage areas, while the Navy removed sunken vessels and other debris offshore and dredged the harbor.

On 13 September 1944, the Seabees were given the order to turn Saipan into a major advance naval base. The 39th, 17th, 101st, 117th, 595th and 614th Construction Battalions and the 31st Special Battalion joined in the construction. To keep boats and LVTs on the fighting front, there was great demand for bases that could repair and restock boats in remote ports. Hospitals were initially in tents, but over time these were replaced by Quonset huts, and water, sewage, air-conditioning, asphalt roads and concrete sidewalks were added. The 17th Naval Construction Battalion built a 400-bed hospital in early 1945, which received casualties from the Battle of Iwo Jima and the Okinawa campaign. Army hospitals built on Saipan included the 3,000-bed 5th Convalescent Hospital and the 2,000-bed 148th General Hospital, both of which were completed in April 1945, the 39th General Hospital and the 176th and 369th Station Hospitals.

=== Tinian ===
Responsibility for the transformation of Tinian into a base for B-29 bombers was assigned to the 6th Naval Construction Brigade, commanded by Captain Paul J. Halloran. For this work his brigade had the 29th and 30th Naval Construction Regiments; a third regiment, the 49th Naval Construction Regiment, arrived in March 1945. Two air bases were constructed, North Field and West Field. These were on the site of the existing Japanese fields at Ushi Point and Gurguan Point respectively, but they had to be lengthened to 8,500 feet (2,600 m) and widened to 500 feet (150 m) to handle the B-29s. This task would have been easier if the plateau had been more than 7,000 feet (2,100 m) wide. As it was, large amounts of fill were required.

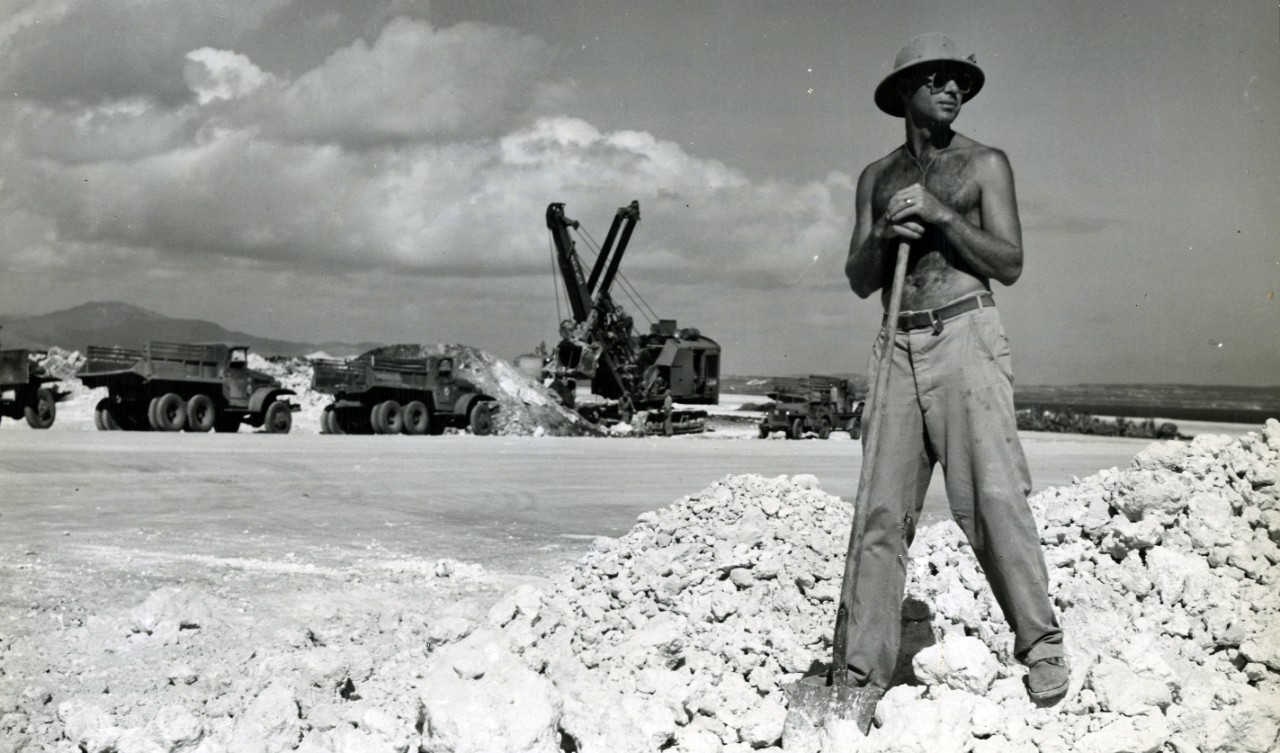
Seabee Vance Shoemate directs truckers to unload coral for B-29 bomber runway on Tinian. In the background is a fleet of trucks awaiting their turn for leads from the scoop shovel.

When work was completed on 5 May 1945, North Field had four parallel 8,500-foot (2,600 m) runways, with 8 miles (13 km) of taxiways, 265 hardstands, 173 Quonset huts and 92 other buildings. Its construction involved 2,109,800 cubic yards (1,613,100 m^{3}) of excavations and 4,789,400 cubic yards (3,661,800 m^{3}) of fill. West Field had two B-29 runways, 53,000 feet (16,000 m) of taxiways, 220 hardstands and 251 administration, maintenance and repair buildings. The adjacent base for naval aircraft had 16,000 feet (4,900 m) of taxiways, 70 hardstands, 345 Quonset huts, 33 administration, maintenance and repair buildings, and a 75-foot (23 m) tall control tower.

At first, fuel had to be supplied in drums. Later, aviation gasoline was drawn from a barge anchored in Tinian Harbor. The fuel storage and distribution system was completed by 8 March 1945. This included storage tanks for 14,000 US barrels (1,700,000 L) of diesel oil, 20,000 US barrels (2,400,000 L) of motor gasoline and 165,000 US barrels (19,700,000 L) of aviation gasoline. Fuel was pumped over a submarine pipeline from an oil tanker moored north of Tinian Harbor and distributed over 86,000 feet (26,000 m) of pipeline. Work on the harbor included dredging operations and the construction of a breakwater and quays for Liberty ships. Until it was completed in March 1945, cargo was brought ashore by LCMs and LCTs.

North Field became operational in February 1945 and West Field the following month. The 313th Bombardment Wing arrived from the United States in December 1944 and was based at North Field. The 58th Bombardment Wing arrived from the China-Burma-India Theater in March 1945 and was based at West Field. A third formation, the 509th Composite Group, arrived in May 1945 and moved to North Field, where it took over an area specially constructed for it. Thus, two of the five bombardment wings of the Twentieth Air Force were based on Tinian. These formations participated in the campaign of air raids on Japan, including the bombing of Tokyo on 10 March 1945, and the atomic bombings of Hiroshima and Nagasaki on 6 and 9 August 1945.

The Navy disestablished the base on Tinian on 1 December 1946, but the Trust Territory of the Pacific Islands, of which Saipan and Tinian were part, remained administered by the US Navy until it was transferred to the United States Department of the Interior in 1951. In 2023, concerns about a conflict with China led to Tinian being reactivated as an alternative base, and in 2024 Fluor Corporation was awarded a $409 million contract to rebuild the airbase at North Field.

=== Guam ===
In the months after the battle, Guam was transformed into a major supply, naval and air base, and eventually became the location of the headquarters of the Commander in Chief of the Pacific Fleet, Admiral Chester W. Nimitz. For this purpose, the 5th Naval Construction Brigade was activated at Pearl Harbor on 1 June 1944 under the command of Captain William O. Hiltabidle Jr., with the 26th, 27th and 28th (Special) Naval Construction Regiments assigned. The first Seabees, the 25th and 53rd Construction Battalions, 2nd and 13th Special Battalions and Construction Battalion Maintenance Unit 515, arrived with the assault troops, and mainly performed stevedoring duties. The 5th Naval Construction Brigade staff came ashore on 23 July.

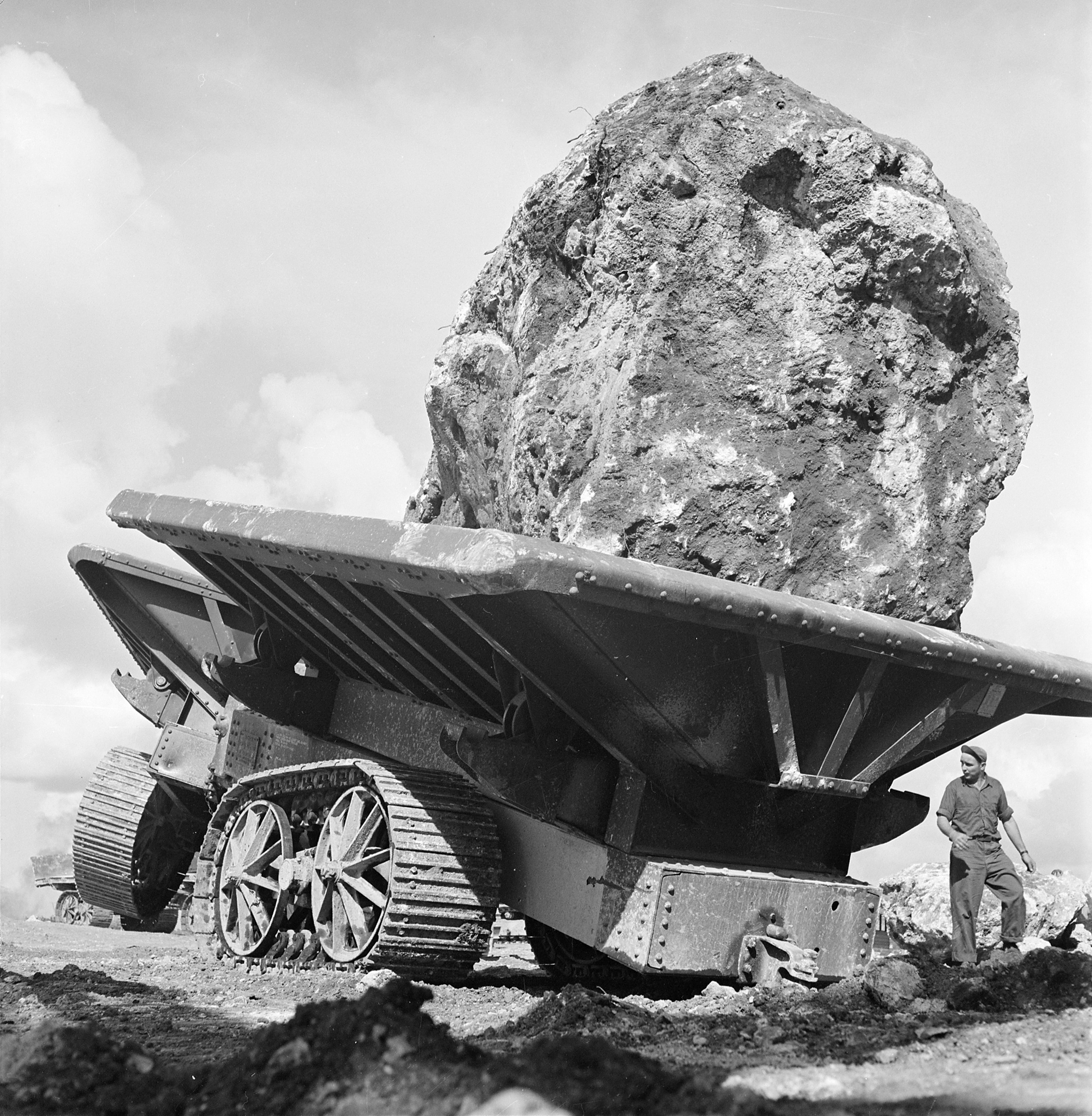
Seawall under construction by Seabees of the 76th Construction Battalion at Apra Harbor. A 30-ton boulder is hauled to a dumping spot.

The first order of business was the development of Apra Harbor. Work commenced on a pontoon pier on Cabras Island on 5 August. This was completed on 22 August, and by October six 42-by-350-foot (13 by 107 m) piers were in operation. Between 3 and 6 October, Guam was struck by a typhoon that wrecked all the piers and severely damaged the barges that had been sunk to create a breakwater. The damage was repaired, and a new design was used to make the piers more resilient. Limestone was quarried on Cabras Island to construct a breakwater 3,260 feet (990 m) in length and 32 feet (9.8 m) in width. Development of the inner harbor involved 7,500,000 cubic feet (210,000 m^{3}) of dredging.

The Japanese-built Orote Field was rebuilt and lengthened to 5,500 feet (1,700 m). The airstrip near Agana was extended to 7,000 feet (2,100 m), with the orientation shifted slightly to avoid Mount Barrigada, and a second runway was added. The first planes landed there on 22 October. A third airstrip, north of Agana Field, became Depot and later Harmon Field. The 7,000-by-150-foot (2,134 by 46 m) runway was sealed with two inches of asphalt concrete and 12,000 feet (3,700 m) of taxiway was constructed. The first B-29s landed there on 24 November. Two B-29 airfields, North Field and Northwest Fields, were built by army aviation engineer battalions. North Field was commissioned on 3 February 1945, and the first B-29 raid from Guam was launched from there on 24 February. A second runway was operational by April. The south runway at Northwest Field became operational on 1 June, and the north runway on 1 July.

The seabees and army engineers also built the Naval Base Hospital, Fleet Hospitals 103 and 115, and the Army's 373rd Station Hospital and 204th General Hospital. Their 9,000 beds were soon used for casualties from the Battle of Iwo Jima. Race relations between white and African-American personnel were strained, resulting in the Agana Race Riot in December 1944. By August 1945, 201,718 American troops were based on Guam, of which 65,095 were Army and Army Air Forces, 77,911 were Navy, and 58,712 were Marines.

Guam remained an important American base after the war. Naval Operating Base, Guam, was redesignated Naval Base Guam in 1952 and subsequently became a home port for submarines. In 1947, the USAAF transferred Agana Airfield to the United States Navy, and it became Naval Air Station Agana. It was consolidated with neighboring Harmon Air Force Base in 1949, and operated until 1993, when it was closed by the Base Realignment and Closure (BRAC) Commission. North Field became Andersen Air Force Base in 1947. During the Vietnam War, Guam-based Boeing B-52 Stratofortress bombers flew missions over North Vietnam. Guam hosted 100,000 Vietnamese refugees in 1975 and 6,600 Kurdish refugees in 1996. In 2009, U.S. Naval Base Guam and Andersen Air Force Base became part of Joint Region Marianas, and in 2020, they were joined by a newly created installation, Marine Corps Base Camp Blaz.
