= Vietnam Humanitarian Assistance and Evacuation Act of 1975 =

Proposed U.S. law

- Other short titles: South Vietnam Assistance Act of 1975
- Long title: An Act to authorize funds for humanitarian assistance and evacuation programs in Vietnam and to clarify restrictions on the availability of funds for the use of U.S. Armed Forces in Indochina.
- Enacted by: the 94th United States Congress

Legislative history
- Introduced in the House as H.R. 6096 by Thomas E. Morgan (D–PA) on April 17, 1975; Committee consideration by House International Relations; Passed the House on April 23, 1975 (230-187); Passed the Senate on April 23, 1975 (75-17, in lieu of S. 1484); Reported by the joint conference committee on April 21, 1975; agreed to by the Senate on April 25, 1975 amended, (provisions of S. 1484 inserted in lieu). Conference report disagreed to in House: House disagreed to conference report, roll call #167 (162-246).

The Vietnam Humanitarian Assistance and Evacuation Act of 1975 (H.R. 6096) was U.S. congressional legislation that proposed to designate financial resources for the evacuation and humanitarian aid of South Vietnam preceding the Fall of Saigon. The Act was not passed, however, it began the debate in Congress over how best to evacuate Vietnam and the extent of the President's power to use military troops in order to safely evacuate refugees. These conversations led to the Indochina Migration and Refugee Assistance Act which was introduced shortly after H.R. 6096 failed to pass.

== Legislative Plea for Indochina Evacuation Programs ==
In his address on U.S. foreign policy on April 10, 1975, President Ford requested $722 million for emergency military assistance and an initial sum of $250 million for economic and humanitarian aid for South Vietnam. Ford also stated in his address that the situation in Vietnam had reached a "critical phase requiring immediate and positive decisions by this government" and that in his judgement, "a stabilization of the military situation offers the best opportunity for a political solution." He also asked Congress for clarification of his authority to use troops in the evacuation of Vietnamese who aided the United States and would possibly be in danger.

The request for the use of military troops by the President was met with pushback by some Democratic Congressional members. Senator Robert Byrd stated his opposition to American troops aiding evacuations efforts, saying it would be "impractical and dangerous." Byrd, along with Senator Thomas F. Eagleton, also cited a “dangerous precedent” in letting the President use his inherent powers as Commander in Chief to introduce more troops into South Vietnam for an evacuation.

The White House reported some of the feedback they heard via telegrams and telephone calls. They received 1,125 telegrams expressing opposition and 443 supporting the President's speech and of telephone calls reported, 342 were opposed, and 290 in favor.

Just a week later, the Vietnam Humanitarian Assistance and Evacuation Act was introduced in the House and sought to authorize $150 million, much lower than the $722 million Ford had proposed.

== The Act ==
The Vietnam Humanitarian Assistance and Evacuation Act was introduced in the House on April 17, 1975. It sought to authorize $150 million for the President to use as deemed necessary and appropriate, for humanitarian assistance in, and evacuation programs from, South Vietnam. This bill would also permit funds already authorized for Indochina Postwar Reconstruction that were not directly allocated to humanitarian relief during evacuation. Section 3 of the bill waived specific provisions of law that might otherwise limit the President's authority to use appropriated funds to carry out the evacuation safely with troops. The bill also defined those eligible for evacuation assistance as: (a) American citizens; (b) dependents of American citizens and of permanent residents of the United States; (c) Vietnamese nationals eligible for immigration to the United States by reason of their relationships to American citizens; and (d) such other foreign nationals to whose lives a direct and imminent threat exists.

The House referred the bill to the House Committee on International Relations. The bill then passed the House with a vote of 230-187 on April 23, 1975. On April 24, the Senate passed an amendment to the bill (S. 1484). S.1484, also called the Vietnam Contingency Act, established the Vietnam contingency fund and lowered the amount of funds to $1 million during 1975 for humanitarian and withdrawal purposes that the President determines is in the national interest. The amendment also called for the President to report each day on the number of citizens in Vietnam and the number of citizens and foreign nationals who had left as well as a report within 48 hours of enactment of the Act of the President's plans for evacuation of the persons described in Section 4 of the Act.

On April 25, 1975, the Senate passed the bill with the amendment with a vote of 46 to 17. The House filed the Conference Report on April 28. On May 1, however, the U.S. 94th House of Representatives rejected the Act in a vote of one hundred and sixty-two to two hundred and forty-six.

== Impact ==
Just a week after the bill failed to pass, Rep. Peter W. Rodino introduced the Indochina Migration and Refugee Assistance Act (H.R. 6755) to the House of Representatives on. The bill was passed with much greater support than Vietnam Humanitarian Assistance and Evacuation Act with only 2 senators dissenting on May 23, 1975 and allocated $455 million “for the performance of functions set forth in Migration and Refugee Assistance Act.”

== Illustrations ==
Indochina Safe Conduct Articles
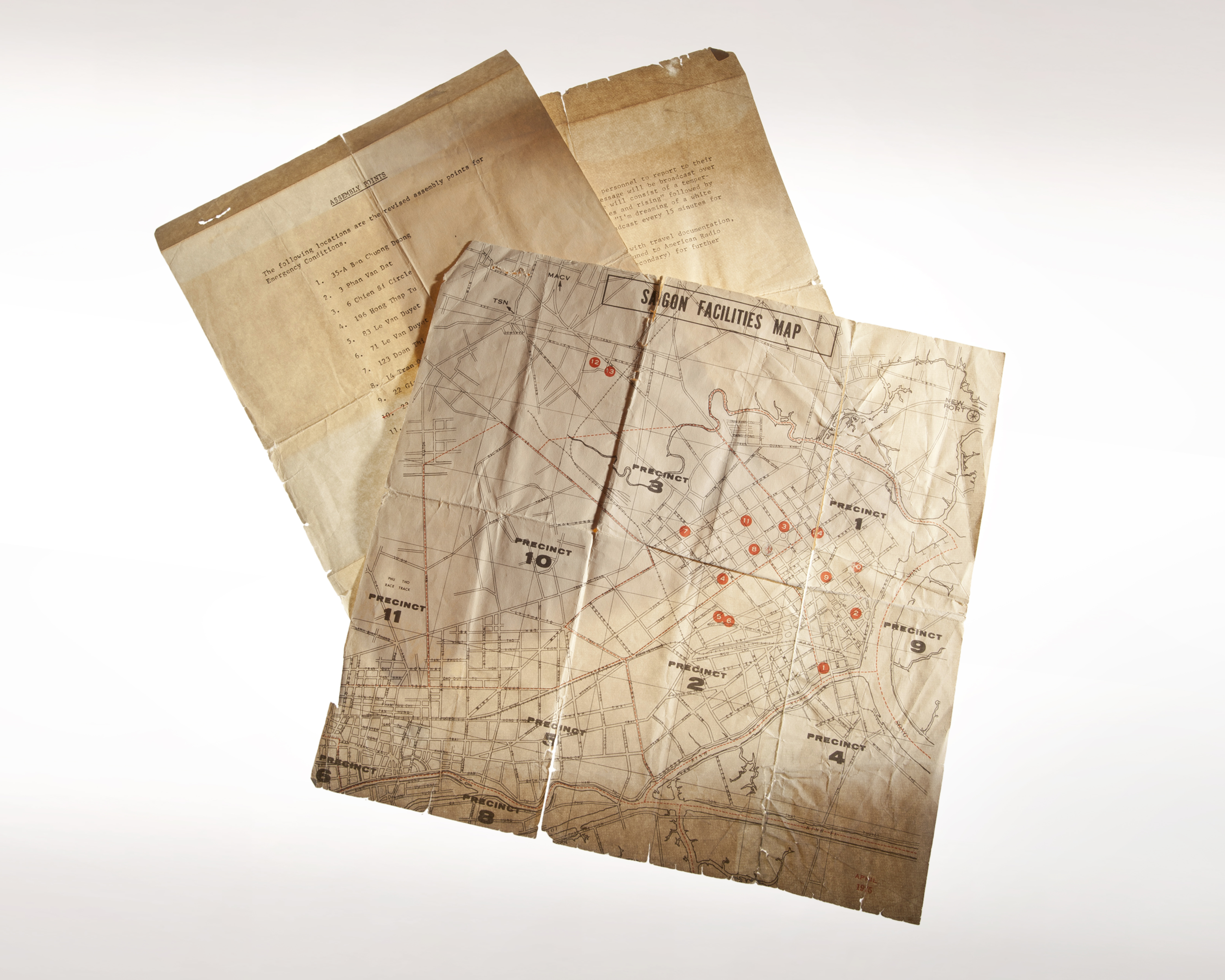
22 Gia Long Street and Saigon evacuation facilities map

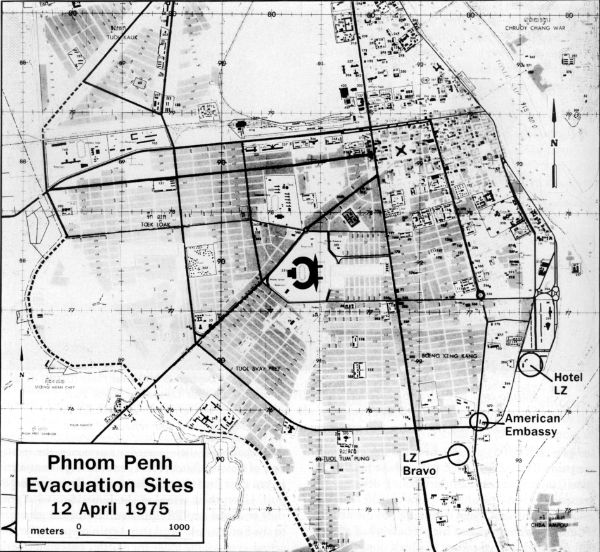
Phnom Penh airlift landing zones for allied Cambodian evacuations

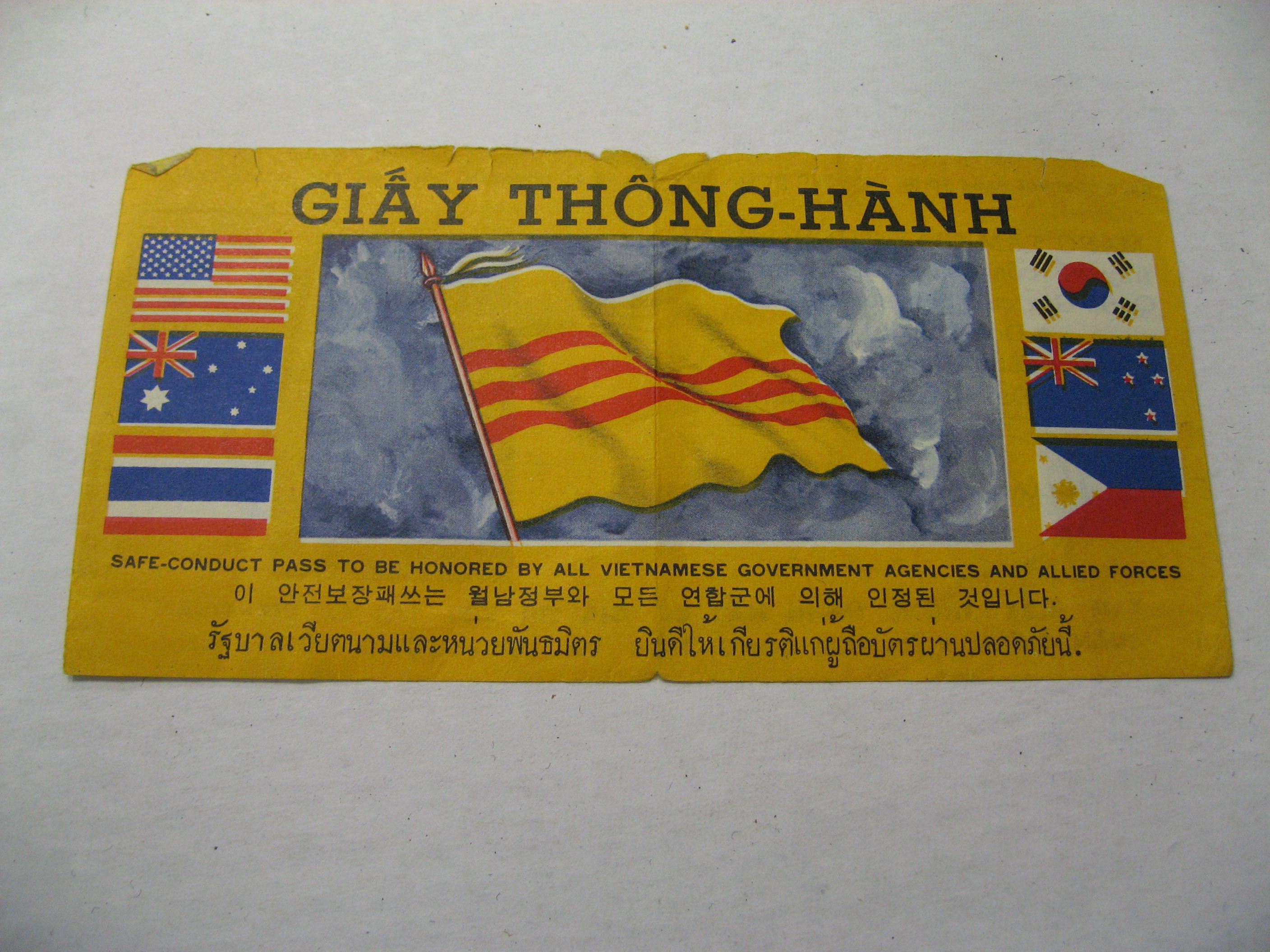
Safe conduct pass air dropped by American forces beginning in 1967 to encourage defection of North Vietnamese and Viet Cong forces

== See also ==
1975 Spring Offensive	Indochina Wars
Case–Church Amendment	Khmer Rouge
Cooper–Church Amendment	Maoism
Declaration of Honolulu, 1966	McGovern–Hatfield Amendment
Foreign Assistance Act	Pentagon Papers
Ho Chi Minh trail	Vietnam Veterans Memorial
Indochina Migration and Refugee Assistance Act	Vietnamese boat people
Indochina refugee crisis	War of the Flags

Indochina Evacuation Operations of 1975

Operation Babylift
Operation Eagle Pull
Operation Frequent Wind
Operation New Arrivals
Operation New Life

== Documentary Film Bibliography ==
- Battleground Vietnam: War in the Jungle (DVD). St. Laurent, Quebec: Madacy Entertainment Group. 2005. ISBN 9780778624332. OCLC 67107650.
- That Was Nam: The Collection (DVD). Minneapolis, Minnesota: Mill Creek Entertainment. 2010. OCLC 744470026.
- Vietnam: The Air War 1964-1972 (DVD). Portland, Oregon: Columbia River Entertainment Group. 2011. ISBN 9781587106323. OCLC 828146976.

== Historical Video Archives ==
- "This Is Saigon". Internet Archive. U.S. National Archives. 1967.
- "The Refugees". Internet Archive. U.S. Department of Defense. 1968.
- "Fall of Saigon". Internet Archive. U.S. National Archives. 1975.
- The Vietnam War - Ken Burns playlist on YouTube
- The Vietnam War - Ken Burns playlist on YouTube
