= Indochina Migration and Refugee Assistance Act =

US law allowing Southeast Asian refugees to move to the United States

- Long title: An Act to enable the United States to render assistance to, or in behalf of, certain migrants and refugees.
- Nicknames: Indochina Migration and Refugee Assistance Act of 1975
- Enacted by: the 94th United States Congress
- Effective: May 23, 1975

Citations
- Public law: 94-23
- Statutes at Large: 89 Stat. 87

Codification
- Titles amended: 22 U.S.C.: Foreign Relations and Intercourse
- U.S.C. sections amended: 22 U.S.C. ch. 36 § 2601 et seq.

Legislative history
- Introduced in the House as H.R. 6755 by Peter W. Rodino (D–NJ) on May 7, 1975; Committee consideration by House Judiciary, Senate Foreign Relations; Passed the House on May 14, 1975 (381-31); Passed the Senate on May 16, 1975 (77-2, in lieu of S. 1661); Reported by the joint conference committee on May 20, 1975; agreed to by the House on May 21, 1975 (agreed) and by the Senate on May 21, 1975 (agreed); Signed into law by President Gerald Ford on May 23, 1975

The Indochina Migration and Refugee Assistance Act, passed on May 23, 1975, under President Gerald Ford, was a response to the Fall of Saigon and the end of the Vietnam War. Under this act, approximately 130,000 refugees from South Vietnam, Laos and Cambodia were allowed to enter the United States under a special status, and the act allotted special relocation aid and financial assistance.

== Historical context ==
The end of the Vietnam War left millions of Southeast Asians displaced. In South Vietnam alone, the war had created over 6 million refugees from 1965 to 1971. Preceding May 1975, the United States policy for Southeast Asian refugees had been to assist by resettling them in safer areas of their home nations. As the war began to come to a close in early 1975, the State Department prepared an evacuation plan for U.S. forces as well as 18,000 Vietnamese refugees, but it quickly became apparent that this evacuation plan did not meet the massive need of the refugees. When the South Vietnam government rapidly deteriorated in April 1975, President Ford authorized an evacuation of up to 200,000 refugees.

== Enactment and provisions ==
The Indochina Migration and Refugee Act was signed on May 23, 1975, and allocated funding of $305 million for the Department of State and $100 million for the Department of Health, Education and Welfare for the resettlement of Vietnamese and Cambodian refugees in the United States. This act financed the transportation, processing, reception, and resettlement costs of more than 130,000 Vietnamese who had been evacuated from Vietnam during Operation Frequent Wind and who were granted parole by the Attorney General to enter the United States.

Most of the refugees were initially transported to Guam for processing (See Operation New Life) and then transported onward to temporary immigration centers set up at Eglin Air Force Base, Florida; Camp Pendleton, California; Fort Chaffee, Arkansas; and Fort Indiantown Gap, Pennsylvania. Each refugee underwent a security check and could theoretically be denied admittance if he or she "violated a social norm, had a criminal record, or had offenses that were political in nature." However, involuntary repatriation to Vietnam was not an option. A team effort of dozens of immigration agencies aided in the resettlement process, including the United States Catholic Conference, Church World Service, International Rescue Committee, Hebrew Immigrant Aid Society, the Lutheran Immigration and Refugee Service, the Tolstoy Foundation, the American Council for Nationalities Service, the American Fund for Czechoslovak Refugees, the Travelers Aid International Social Service of America, as well as several state and city service centers. In 1975, almost 130,000 refugees were paroled through this system, which finished its initial operations at Fort Chaffee in December of that same year. While the first year of the Act had come to a close, it opened the doors for years of mass refugee acceptance.

== Opposition ==
Although many politicians thought it appropriate and necessary for the United States to provide a safe haven for those denied their human rights, some questioned the fairness of the Indochina Migration and Refugee Act for several reasons. Some, mostly conservative Republicans, argued that the refugees would never be able to assimilate to American culture and would detract from the value system already in place. Other legislators, like Representative Frank Sensenbrenner, were concerned with the price tag of committing so many immigrants (roughly $1 billion per year), especially in a time of rising unemployment. While many refugees were receiving financial assistance, economic success did not come easily and this use of federal funding became an issue that not only lawmakers were paying attention too, but also the American public. Another group of opponents focused on the growing need of poor Americans. Representative John Conyers asked, "Should we be spending (federal dollars) on Vietnamese refugees or should we spend them on Detroit 'refugees?'" A last group of opponents believed that presidents Ford and Carter were taking advantage of the parole system to allow mass numbers of people into the nation. In their view, the parole system should have been only used for people with specific cases, and certainly not for the processing of huge groups.

During the Senate's vote on the Senate version of the bill, S. 1661, on May 16, 1975, only two senators voted against it, namely Republican Senators Jesse Helms (NC) and William L. Scott (VA).

Democratic Senator Joe Biden (DE) was not present for the final vote on this bill, S.1661. He later voted in favor of advancing this bill to the floor, however, joining 13 other senators on the Senate Foreign Relations Committee with a vote in favor. One senator, Democratic Senator Mike Mansfield (MT), voted present.

== Support ==
Democratic Senator Edward Kennedy and Democratic Representative Liz Holtzman were the leaders of the refugee advocacy community, and the first supporters of the 1975 Act. They were backed by labor groups like the AFL-CIO and religious services, including the Hebrew Immigrant Aid Society and Church World Service. Their goals to redefine the legal notions of "refugee status" and attain a more comprehensive amnesty policy were not realized until the Refugee Act of 1980. President Ford took a stance that impacted the lives of many, both the refugees and the people of America. In President Ford's press statement on April 3, he discussed the urgency of aiding the people of Vietnam. He said, "We are seeing a great human tragedy as untold numbers of Vietnamese flee the North Vietnamese onslaught. The United States has been doing and will continue to do its utmost to assist these people." He presented two options in terms of aiding the South Vietnamese people. They both involved monetary assistance, but the second option went deeper and called for emergency military and humanitarian assistance (Ford 1975). He stated "I must, of course, as I think of each of you would, consider the safety of nearly 6,000 Americans who remain in South Vietnam and tens of thousands of South Vietnamese employees of the United States Government, of news agencies, of contractors and businesses for many years whose lives, with their dependents, are in very grave peril."

== Implications ==
In response to the new need of welfare assistance to the new relocated refugees, the Indochinese Refugee Assistance Program was developed. This gave clearance for any Vietnamese, Cambodian, or Lao refugees to tap into the same resources that Cuban refugees had attained in the early 1970s, which included financial assistance and health, employment, and education services. The Indochina Migration and Refugee Act was a watershed moment in U.S. Asian immigration policy. It opened the gates for displaced persons from Southeast Asia and also served as a symbol of commitment to those affected by the devastation from the Vietnam War. The decision by President Ford to admit such a substantial number of refugees was very much against public opinion and (despite attempts at thinning the refugee flow) the Carter Administration continued to admit thousands of refugees each year. By 1978, the U.S. was receiving thousands of refugees who had made their way by boat through the dangerous waters of the South China Sea. This continued until refugee policy was reformed with the Refugee Act of 1980. However, because of the positive global reception to the Indochina Migration and Refugee Act of 1975, the United States has continued to use a more liberal approach to refugee admittance, especially with those from areas the United States is militarily engaged with. This ended in 2001 with the war in Afghanistan and subsequent fears over the possibility of terrorists hiding amongst refugees.

== See also ==
- Indochina refugee crisis
- Operation New Life
- Vietnam Humanitarian Assistance and Evacuation Act of 1975
- Vietnamese boat people

== Presidential Statements of Gerald Ford ==
- Ford, Gerald R. (June 23, 1975). "Letter to Congressional Committee Chairmen Transmitting Reports on the Status of Indochina Refugees and Retrieval of Indochina Assistance Funds - June 23, 1975". Internet Archive. Washington, D.C.: National Archives and Records Service. pp. 855–856.
- Ford, Gerald R. (December 24, 1975). "Statement on the Conclusion of the Indochina Refugee Resettlement Program - December 24, 1975". HathiTrust Digital Library. Washington, D.C.: National Archives and Records Service. p. 1998.
