= Operation New Arrivals =

1975 US relocation of Vietnamese refugees

Operation New Arrivals (April 29 – September 16, 1975) was the relocation of 130,000 Vietnamese refugees from Pacific island staging areas to the United States.

Following the South-Vietnamese evacuation during the Fall of Saigon, Operation New Life, and Babylift at the end of the Vietnam War, refugees were relocated to the United States to begin assimilation and resettlement into American society. 251 C-141 and C-130 flights and 349 commercial flights airlifted the refugees to camps around the United States. These camps consisted of Camp Pendleton, California (opened April 29), Fort Chaffee, Arkansas (opened May 2), Eglin Air Force Base, Florida (opened May 4), and Fort Indiantown Gap, Pennsylvania (opened May 28). The operation relocated, supported and sheltered the refugees until civilian agencies were able to resettle them.

== See also ==
- Operation Frequent Wind
- Operation New Life
- Operation Babylift
