= USS Hector (AR-7) =

1942 Vulcan-class repair ship

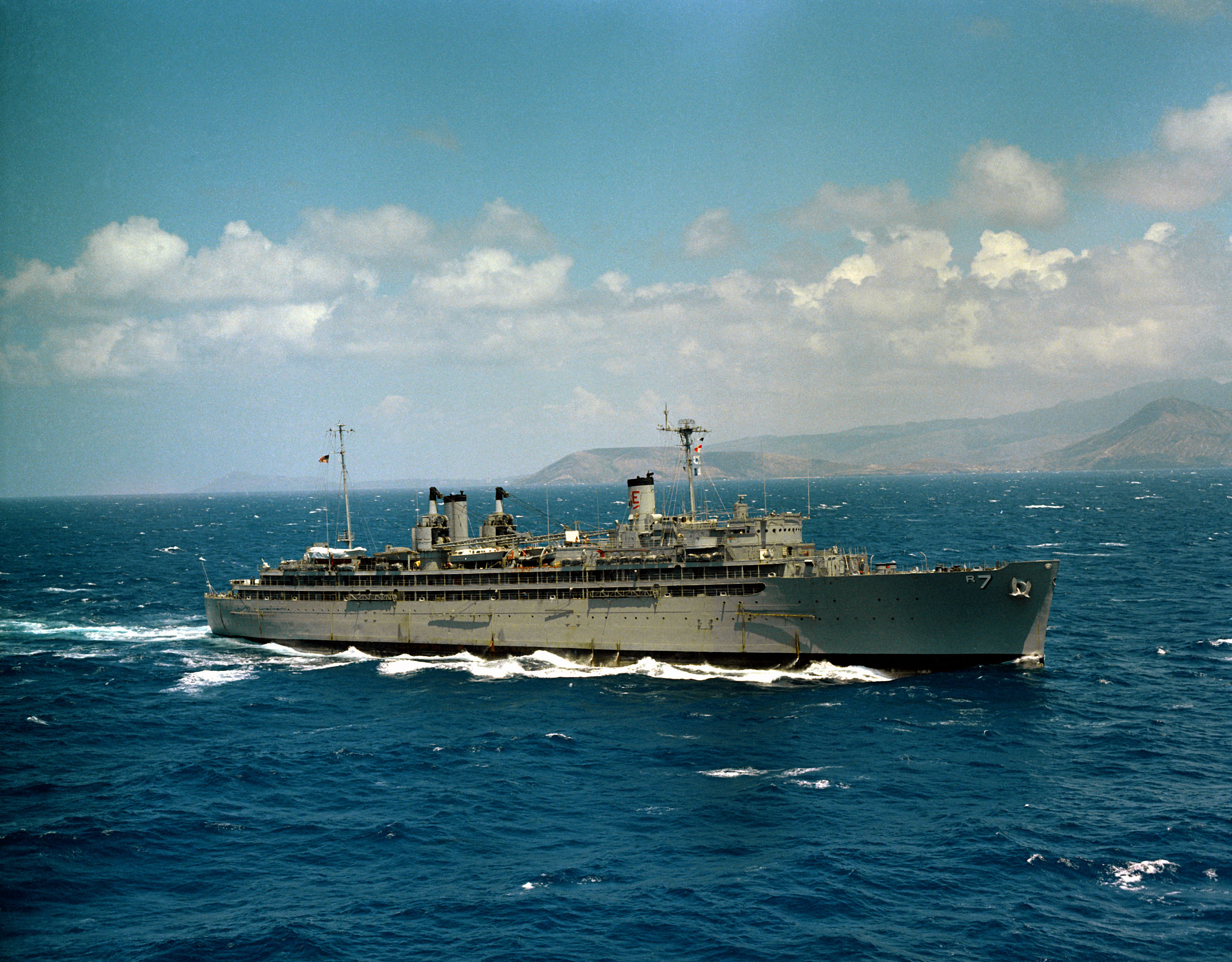
- USS Hector (AR-7) in 1985

History

United States
- Name: USS Hector
- Namesake: Hector
- Builder: Los Angeles Shipbuilding and Dry Dock Company, San Pedro, California
- Launched: 11 November 1942
- Commissioned: 7 February 1944
- Decommissioned: 31 March 1987
- Stricken: 1 July 1994
- Identification: AR-7
- Honors and awards: 1972 Meritorious Unit Commendation; 3 x Humanitarian Service Medals
- Fate: 20 April 1989 Leased to Pakistan and renamed Moawin. Returned to US custody at Singapore in 1994 and scrapped in India.

General characteristics
- Class & type: Vulcan-class repair ship
- Displacement: 9,140/16200 tons
- Length: 529 ft 6 in (161.39 m)
- Beam: 73 ft 6 in (22.40 m)
- Draft: 23 ft 4 in (7.11 m)
- Speed: 19 knots (35 km/h; 22 mph)
- Complement: 1,108
- Armament: 4 x 5 in (130 mm) guns; 8 x 40 mm guns; 8 x 20 mm cannon

USS Hector (AR-7) was a repair ship that served in the United States Navy from 1944 to 1987 and as PNS Moawin in the Pakistan Navy from 1989 to 1994.

== World War II ==
Hector was launched 11 November 1942 by the Los Angeles Shipbuilding and Dry Dock Company, San Pedro, California and sponsored by Mrs. Schuyler F. Helm. Hector was commissioned 7 February 1944. Hector had twin screws, (propellers), and two engine rooms. The boilers produced 400 psi of steam pressure. Among other things, some of the repair shops on board were a foundry, machine shop, canvas shop, optical repair, pump / valve repair, welding, diesel repair, scuba divers, Radio repair, and perhaps others. There were two cranes topside for lifting objects on and off of the ship. The crew consisted of 1108 officers and enlisted. Displacement was 9140 tons. Length was 529 feet 6 inches. Beam was 73 feet 6 inches Flank Speed was 19 knots.

After shakedown along the West Coast, the new repair ship sailed for the Pacific, reaching Pearl Harbor 9 April 1944. She remained at Pearl Harbor effecting repairs on various ships, primarily landing craft, until she departed for Eniwetok on 5 June. Arriving there 13 June, Hector spent the summer at Eniwetok and then sailed for Ulithi 30 September. Her biggest repair job of the war came to her 27 October at Ulithi as the cruiser USS Houston, torpedoed twice by Japanese submarines, was towed alongside. Although hampered by a severe typhoon season which twice sent her out to sea for safety, Hector managed to repair Houston by the end of the year besides aiding many other smaller craft.

Hector departed Ulithi on 16 February 1945 and five days later steamed into Tarragona, Leyte Gulf, to repair ships as the battle for the Philippines raged. This task completed, she returned to Ulithi 30 March and continued on to Saipan 22 May. After the war ended on 1 September, Hector remained in the Pacific to prepare various ships for return to the United States.

== Korean War ==
Departing Saipan 21 January 1946, Hector reached Long Beach, California 3 February. After serving as a repair ship there, she sailed for her first WestPac cruise 7 May 1947, thereby settling into a peacetime schedule interrupted 3 years later by the outbreak of Korean War. Hector sailed into Yokosuka 18 September 1950. From there she continued to Inchon, Korea, arriving at the scene of the Inchon Invasion, 25 September. For the remainder of the Korean War Hector alternated repair service along the Korean coast and in Japan with normal duty out of Long Beach. In 1954 she was presented with the Battle Efficiency Plaque for the year 1953–1954, and again in 1955 was awarded the same plaque for the year 1954–1955.

Thereafter, as before the Korean War, Hector alternated four to six months of service and exercises along the California coast with 6- and 8-month WestPac cruises. During these cruises the repair ship, operating in support and service of the United States Pacific and Asian defenses, visited such ports as Yokosuka, Hong Kong, Shanghai, Guam, and Eniwetok. Serving intermittently as flagship for both Service Squadrons 1 and 3, Hector also was a major participant in the Navy's "People to People" program in Asia. Her deployments to the Western Pacific continued into the 1960s.

== Vietnam ==
Hector operated in the Far East from Japan to the Philippines between June 1963 and January 1964. After providing repair services for ships at Long Beach during the remainder of 1964 and the first 6 months of 1965, she underwent a modernization overhaul at Long Beach between July 1965 and February 1966 to increase her repair capabilities. Thence, she resumed fleet services out of Long Beach until departing for the Far East 5 August. She arrived Subic Bay later that month, and during the next six months repaired and serviced ships in the Philippines, Taiwan, and Japan. She returned to the West Coast in March 1967 and into mid-1967 Hector continued to maintain a high state of readiness and provide repair services at Long Beach.

Hector departed for WESTPAC via Pearl Harbor on 3 January 1972 arriving in Sasebo 26 January where she served as the flagship for COMSERVGRU THREE. While providing service to the fleet during this deployment Hector visited Vung Tau, Vietnam, Hong Kong, DaNang, Vietnam, Subic Bay RP, Okinawa, and Keelung, Taiwan. On 26 August Hector was relieved as COMSERVGRU THREE flagship and departed Sasebo for the US and arrived in Long Beach on 9 September 1972.

In 1972 Hector was awarded a Meritorious Unit Commendation that read in part the following: For meritorious service from 26 January to 25 August 1972 in direct support of United States Seventh Fleet combat operations in Southeast Asia. USS Hector contributed materially to the success of these operations by rendering vital fleet repair services to United States and friendly naval forces operating in the Republic of Vietnam. Hector also received a Republic of Vietnam Meritorious Unit Citation and three additional Vietnam Service Medals during this deployment. Hector serviced the fleet as needed in various ports and locations. Hector provided maintenance repairs as well as damage repairs on ships from combat actions, notably the destroyers USS Higbee, USS Joseph Strauss and USS Buchanan.

1974 began with Hector in Sasebo, Japan, and after visiting Yokosuka, that deployment ended with her return to Long Beach in the middle of February. In March, Hector's home port was shifted to Mare Island, Vallejo, California. She underwent overhaul in Richmond, California in April, and visited San Diego during the same year.

== End of Vietnam and Cold War ==
During the evacuation of Saigon in 1975 (Operation New Life), Hector aided in setting up camps in Guam for Vietnamese refugees, for which Hector earned her first Humanitarian Service Award. During the same year, she completed conversion to Navy Distillate fuel and renovation to her crew's galley, mess decks and scullery.

During her deployment in 1977, Hector was called on to replenish combatant ships that had departed Pearl Harbor quickly in order to observe Soviet cruise missile triangulation operations. During this operation, the infamous "Hector Missile" was built to confuse the enemy. It was thought that the ship may come under Soviet Satellite observation, so a missile was constructed on board ship using 5 gallon soup and tomato cans taped together to form the body, then fins added to the rear and a cone to the front. Paint and lettering was added. The 5" guns that she once had were previously removed, and the only defenses Hector had at this time were .50 caliber machine guns. In July, Hector was forced to cancel an R&R visit to Keelung, Taiwan in order to evade Typhoon Vera, which struck northern Taiwan. She proceeded on to her next scheduled port, Subic Bay, Philippines.

During the spring of 1978, Hector provided Fleet Repair Service in Seattle, WA. Her deployment in September began with a visit to Papeete, Tahiti, and later to Subic Bay, Keelung, Taiwan; Pusan, Korea and finished the year providing FRS in Yokosuka, Japan.

In 1980, she received a major overhaul, and Hector became one of the first ships in the Pacific Fleet to have women officers report aboard. (One of whom was Ensign Darlene Iskra who served aboard as Diving Officer from 1980 to 1982 who went on to become the first woman to command a naval vessel, USS Opportune, in 1990.)

In 1981, Hector began her 25th deployment, visiting Subic Bay Philippines, Yokosuka Japan; Diego Garcia; Mombasa, Kenya, Melbourne, Australia, Auckland, New Zealand, Tonga, and Western Samoa. While in Pearl Harbor, Hector sent a team to rescue 12 passengers of a plane which crashed 200 yards (180 m) off Hector's quarter. For this she was commended by Commander in Chief, US Pacific Fleet. In October 1981, Hector's home port was again shifted, from Mare Island to Oakland, California.

In June 1982 the first ten enlisted women reported aboard Hector at the Naval Supply Center in Oakland, California. Hector received the Navy "E" Ribbon for the period 1 January 1982 – 30 June 1983.

In 1983, Hector spent a month repairing ships in Bremerton, Washington. During the month of April, Hector temporarily served as the Logistic Command Center while Commander Task Force 73 was embarked for FLEET EX 83–1, the largest military exercise in the North Pacific since World War II.

In 1984, during the ship's 26th deployment, Hector steamed over 35,000 miles. She also provided disaster relief to the storm battered island of Madagascar. On this deployment Hector received two Humanitarian Medals. One was for the rescue of 28 Vietnamese refugees from a small wooden craft. For the second award, a group of Hector volunteers spent several days in a leper colony doing maintenance on local homes, and other facilities, while in Madagascar. They also provided some much-needed medical service including dental work and amputations, all with field tools and in a damaged gazebo.

Her home port was changed from Alameda to San Diego in 1985, and Hector celebrated her 42nd birthday on the high seas. During transit up the Willamette River to Portland, Oregon in August, Hector's aft mast was snapped off as a result of coming into contact with the Burnside Bridge.

At the beginning of 1986, Hector provided FRS to the Midway Battle Group in Yokosuka, Japan. Hector's stay in Subic Bay was extended to 1 1/2 months during January to February due to Philippine elections and civil unrest. She later visited Al-Masirah, Oman and Pattaya Beach, Thailand.

After 43 years of continuous service Hector was decommissioned on 31 March 1987 in San Diego. USS Hector (AR-7) was transferred to Pakistan and renamed PNS Moawin.

== Awards ==
- Navy Meritorious Unit Commendation
- Navy E Ribbon - (1982–83)
- China Service Medal
- American Campaign Medal
- Asiatic-Pacific Campaign Medal
- World War II Victory Medal
- Korean Service Medal x2
- Vietnam Service Medal x3
- Humanitarian Service Medal – (1975) Operation New Life, (1984) Vietnamese boat people, (1984) Cyclone Kamisy
- Philippines Liberation Medal
- United Nations Service Medal
- Gallantry Cross (South Vietnam)
- Vietnam Campaign Medal
- Korean War Service Medal

== Pakistan service ==
On 20 April 1989, Hector was leased to Pakistan and renamed Moawin. She was returned to the United States at Singapore in 1994 and on 17 October of that year was sold for scrapping to an Indian company.
