= Operation New Life =

Evacuation of Vietnamese refugees in 1975

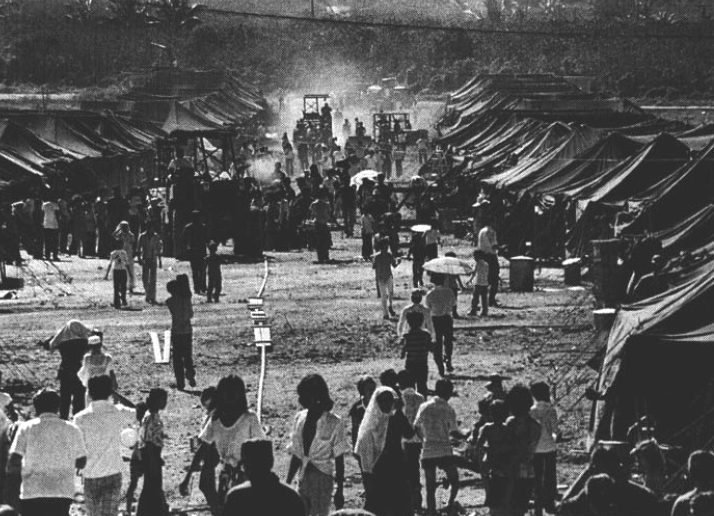
"Tent City" at Orote Field, Guam

Operation New Life (23 April – 1 November 1975) was the care and processing on Guam of Vietnamese refugees evacuated before and after the Fall of Saigon, the closing day of the Vietnam War. More than 111,000 of the evacuated 130,000 Vietnamese refugees were transported to Guam, where they were housed in tent cities for a few weeks while being processed for resettlement. The great majority of the refugees were resettled in the United States. A few thousand were resettled in other countries or chose to return to Vietnam on the vessel Thuong Tin.

== Background ==
In April 1975, as the North Vietnamese People's Army of Vietnam (PAVN) advanced on Saigon, the United States carried out evacuations from South Vietnam, such as Operation Babylift and Operation Frequent Wind for Americans, nationals of allied countries, Vietnamese children or adults who had worked for or been closely associated with the U.S. during the Vietnam War.

To deal with the refugees, President Gerald Ford created the Interagency Task Force (IATF) for Indochina on 18 April 1975. It tasked a dozen government agencies with the responsibility to transport, process, receive and resettle Indochinese refugees, nearly all Vietnamese, in the United States. Ford appointed L. Dean Brown of the Department of State to head Operation New Life. Later he was replaced by Julia V. Taft of the Department of Health, Education, and Welfare (HEW). To finance Operation New Life the Indochina Migration and Refugee Assistance Act was adopted on 23 May 1975. This act allocated funding of $305 million for the State Department and $100 million for HEW.

Nearby countries in Southeast Asia declined to accept the Vietnamese evacuees, fearing that they would have them on their soil permanently. Governor Ricardo Bordallo, agreed to grant the Vietnamese temporary asylum on Guam, some 2,500 miles (4,000 km) from Saigon. However, the Guam Governor had no power to deny the U.S. military to bring in Vietnamese refugees and evacuees. On April 23, Rear Admiral George Stephen Morrison, commander of U.S. Naval forces on Guam, was ordered to "accept, shelter, process and care for refugees as they were removed from South Vietnam."

More than 130,000 Vietnamese were evacuated from South Vietnam by air and sea during the last few days of April. A few went to other locations, such as Wake Island, but most were transported to Guam by U.S. and South Vietnamese naval ships, commercial vessels and military and commercial aircraft. A total of 111,919 Vietnamese would be housed temporarily and processed for entry into the United States on Guam. That total included 2,600 orphans and abandoned children evacuated from South Vietnam under Operation Babylift who transited Guam on 3 and 4 April en route to the United States.

Guam had a substantial U.S. military presence to care for the Vietnamese refugees. Andersen Air Force Base on the northern end of the island was the U.S.'s biggest B-52 base and Naval Base Guam was a large deep-water port for naval vessels.

Typhoons frequently affect Guam and the military and civilian personnel involved in Operation New Life feared that a typhoon would strike Guam while the Vietnamese were living in tents and unprotected from the elements. Fortunately, no typhoon hit Guam in 1975.

== Refugees ==
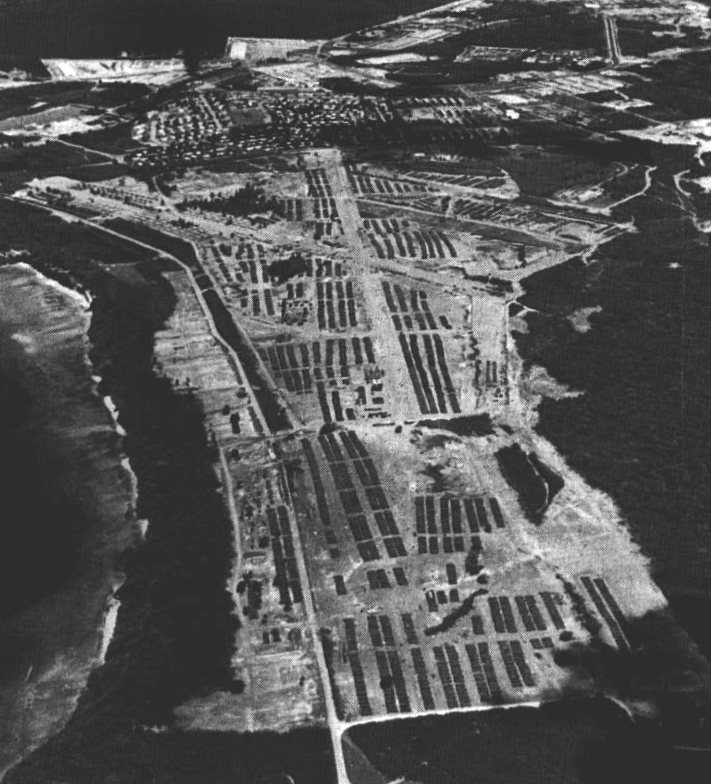
An aerial view of the refugee camp at Orote Field on the Orote Peninsula, Guam, 1975

Although not classified legally as "refugees" under international refugee law, the Vietnamese on Guam were commonly called refugees as well as "evacuees" and "parolees."

The U.S. military estimated that 13,000 refugees could be housed on Guam, and the first arrivals on 23 April were placed in apartments. The numbers, however, reached 20,000 on 27 April, exceeding the capacity of existing housing. The Seabees constructed additional housing, including bulldozing 1,200 acres of brush to create "Tent City" for 50,000 people. On 7 May, three merchant ships arrived at Guam carrying 13,000 Vietnamese, the highest number of people to arrive in a single day. The refugee population on Guam peaked on 13 May at 50,450 - more than one-half the number of permanent residents of the island. Most of the Vietnamese would spend only two or three weeks on Guam before being transported to the United States or, in a few cases, to other countries.

The objective of the evacuation of South Vietnamese had been to remove U.S. government employees and their families, and Vietnamese with close associations with the United States, who were in danger of persecution by the victorious North Vietnamese and Viet Cong. Many of the refugees were former officers in the South Vietnamese military and officials of the South Vietnamese government. However, a Congressional report summed up characteristics of the refugees who arrived in Guam as follows: "Half the Vietnamese we intended to get out did not get out – and half who did get out should not have."

The refugees included "farmers ... an entire fishing village ... Many gave the impression of not knowing where they were or why they were there. Some had simply fled in panic." However, once in Guam, "their destination was the United States ... how many never intended to travel to continental United States will never be known." The majority of the Vietnamese on Guam were from the educated elite of the country. Twenty percent had attended a university; 40 percent were Catholic, and 35 percent spoke some English — all much higher percentages than those of the Vietnamese population as a whole.

The United States Attorney General used his authority to grant parole status to the Vietnamese, which allowed them to enter the United States and remain permanently.

== Military participation ==
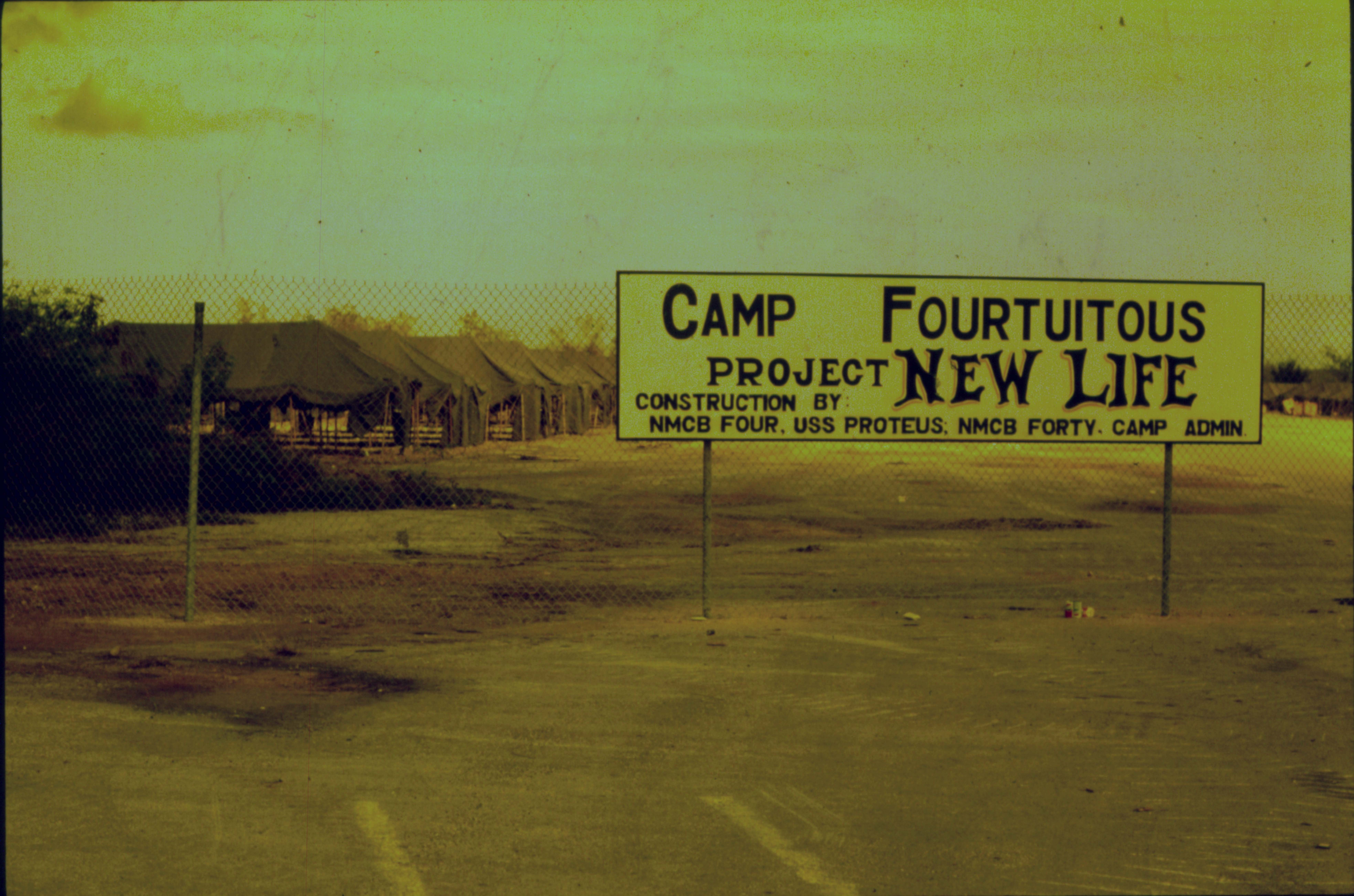
Camp Fourtuitous on Guam, 1975

More than 20,000 military personnel from all services were involved in the operation. The military was tasked with providing transportation, operating refugee reception centers in the Pacific and the United States, and assisting civilian agencies in the resettlement program. Expenses incurred by the military were reimbursed from the funds appropriated to the IATF of which the Department of Defense was a member.

Airlifts from Saigon's Tan Son Nhut Air Base unloaded at Andersen Air Force Base. Passengers were escorted to Tent City, where tents erected just hours before awaited them. Those who fled Vietnam by sea landed at the Naval Supply Station at Apra Harbor. First responders included personnel from USS Proteus, the Naval Station and Naval Mobile Construction Battalion 4.

Tasked with providing food and shelter, Naval Station Tug Base personnel improvised housing from abandoned warehouses of decommissioned Camp Minron with cots and supplies from the base emergency hurricane supplies, fed hundreds from plastic trash cans full of fish and rice from the base galley.

USS Hector also provided hot meals from her own stores and galley. Outside showers were made from a circle of metal lockers and fire hoses with sprinkler heads. The Seabee's first task was the construction of 2,000 squad tents measuring 16 feet (4.9 m) x 32 feet (9.8 m). Seabees also set up Vietnam-style steel drum toilets, which were immediately overwhelmed. The Seabee project list:

- 450 acres of jungle cleared
- electrical system installed
- 25 Southeast Asia huts erected
- 3,546 strong back squad tents erected
- additional berthing – 3,381
- nine galleys erected
- two hospital facilities erected
- 400 restrooms installed
- thousands of feet of water mains installed
- 148 new showers installed
- over 17,000 feet (5,200 m) of fencing installed

Lockheed C-141 Starlifter and Lockheed C-130 Hercules aircraft unloaded and personnel processed at NAS Agana, Brewer Field. The tent camp was located on Orote Field, an abandoned airstrip on the Orote Peninsula within Naval Base Guam. At its peak it held a population of 39,331. The camp, called Camp Rainbow, was staffed by units from the U.S. 25th Infantry Division from Schofield Barracks, Hawaii; initially under the command of Lieutenant Colonel Will H. Horn (April–May), and later of Colonel Jack O'Donohue (June–September). The command consisted of the 1st Battalion, 5th Infantry Regiment and 1st Battalion, 27th Infantry Regiment, elements of the 25th Supply and Transport Battalion, a field hospital from Fort Lewis, WA the 423rd Medical Company and intelligence teams.

In addition to the Army run camp at Orote Point, numerous Vietnamese were housed at Andersen Air Force Base in an area known as Tin City. This complex of pre-engineered metal buildings had previously served as housing for aircraft maintenance and other personnel supporting the B-52 bombing missions that flew from Andersen. The complex included dormitory and latrine facilities which were quickly made ready by base personnel.

Admiral Morrison would later call Operation New Life the most satisfying assignment of his career.

== The Viet Nam Thuong Tin ==
Among the refugees in Guam were about 1,600 people who requested repatriation to Vietnam. Many of them were South Vietnamese army and naval personnel. The Vietnamese navy had loaded up their ships with people during the evacuation and sailed out to sea, ending up in Guam. Their families often left behind, the soldiers and sailors requested—then demanded—that they be allowed to return to Vietnam.

The United Nations High Commissioner for Refugees initially took responsibility for the repatriation. The Vietnamese government demanded that a lengthy questionnaire be completed for each potential returnee. UNHCR completed the questionnaires and submitted them, but no response was forthcoming from Vietnam. Meantime, the refugees became more insistent in their demands to return, including staging demonstrations and threatening violence and suicide. In September 1975, Julia Taft recommended that the Vietnamese be given the merchant ship Thuong Tin and allowed to depart Guam for Vietnam. The U.S. Navy renovated the ship for the voyage to Vietnam.

The State Department was concerned that some among the potential returnees were being coerced by their colleagues into saying they wished to return to Vietnam. State isolated the potential returnees and interviewed each of them individually. Those affirming they wished to return to Vietnam were escorted directly from the interview to the Thuong Tin for departure. Those declining to return, numbering 45, were escorted to the mostly-empty refugee camps for onward transportation to the U.S. The total number of Vietnamese crowded onto the Thuong Tin was 1,546, of whom most were men whose families were in Vietnam. The Thuong Tin departed Guam on 16 October 1975.

The fate of the Thuong Tin was unknown for more than a decade. The ship's captain, Tran Dinh Tru, later told his story. On arrival in Vietnam, Tru and at least some of his shipmates were sent to re-education camps in the rural areas of Vietnam. Tru was imprisoned for 12 years.

The Thuong Tin returnees were nearly the last Vietnamese refugees on Guam. The camps there were closed on 23 October and Operation New Life terminated on 1 November 1975.

== Aftermath ==
The Vietnamese on Guam were flown to one of four military bases: Fort Chaffee in Arkansas, Camp Pendleton in California, Fort Indiantown Gap in Pennsylvania, and Eglin Air Force Base in Florida. There, the U.S. military provided them food and temporary housing while the IATF and charitable organizations gave them language and cultural training and sought sponsors and locations for their resettlement in Operation New Arrivals By 20 December 1975 all the Vietnamese had been resettled in every state and in several foreign countries.

== See also ==
- Operation Frequent Wind
- Operation Babylift
- Operation New Arrivals
