= Orote Field =

Former air base in Guam

- U.S. National Register of Historic Places
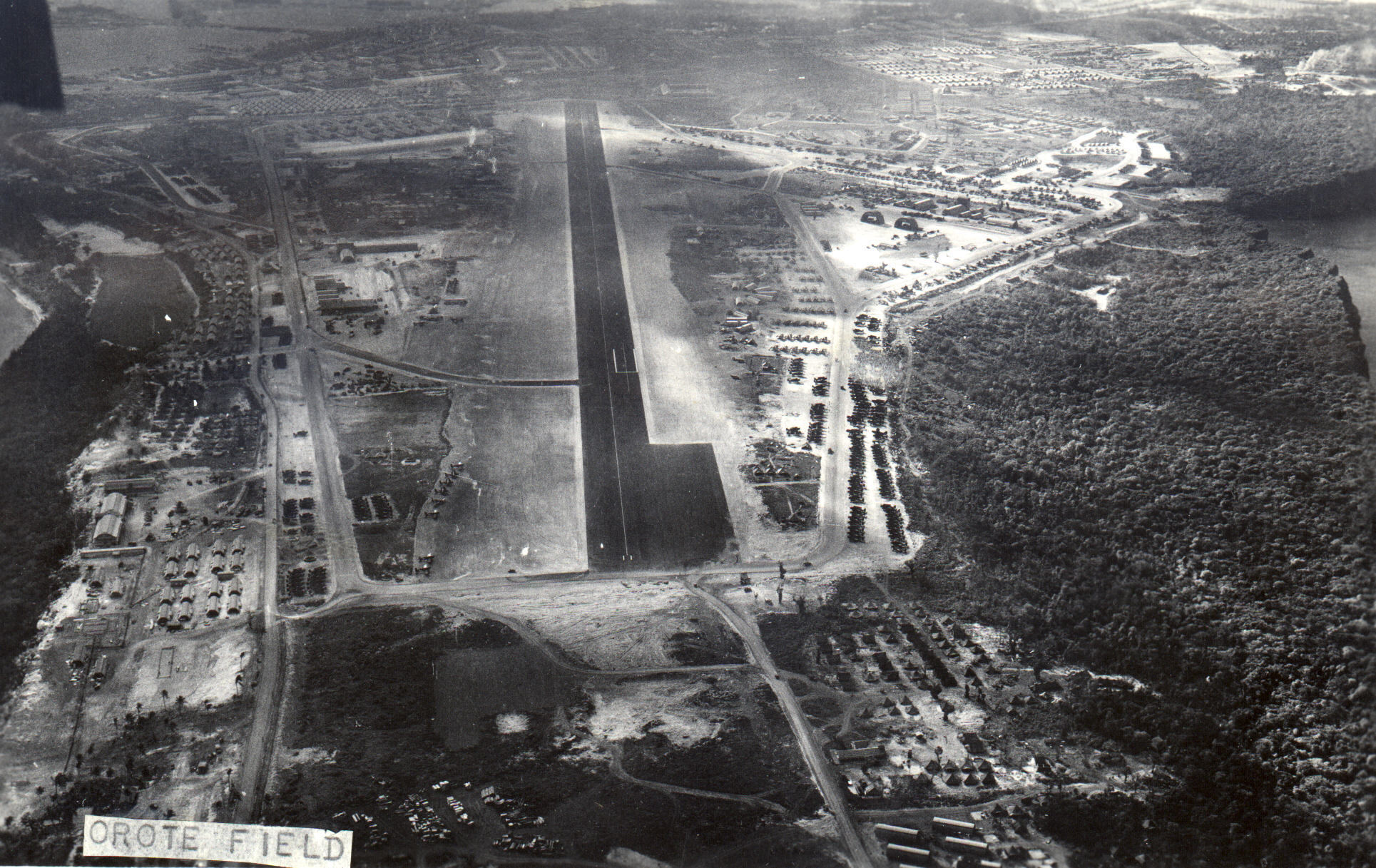
- Orote Field in 1945

- Location within Guam
- Location: Orote Peninsula, Naval Base Guam
- Nearest city: Santa Rita, Guam
- Coordinates: 13°26′13″N 144°38′30″E
- Built: 1943
- NRHP reference No.: 75002149
- Added to NRHP: June 18, 1975

Orote Field is a former air base in the United States territory of Guam built by the Empire of Japan with Chamorro forced labor during the Japanese occupation of Guam (1941-1944). It is separate from the Marine Corps amphibious airplane base at located at Sumay village that was operational from 1921 to 1931. Following the liberation of Guam in 1944, the U.S. military repaired the field for further use in the Pacific War.

Located on Naval Base Guam, Orote Field was largely abandoned after World War II except for occasional training exercises. One major event in 1975 was Operation New Life, when a tent city for tens of thousands of South Vietnamese refugees was erected at the field. The field was listed on the National Register of Historic Places in 1975.

== History ==
On August 6, 1941, Naval Governor George McMillin sent a letter reporting surveys indicating that the Orote Peninsula could sustain a 4,500 feet (1,400 m)-by-400 feet (120 m) landplane runway. However, the U.S. did not actually start construction of a runway.

During the Japanese occupation of Guam, villages were required to supply levies for able-bodied men to work on airfields and other defense projects. Orote Field was the first of the Japanese airfields on Guam to be completed by Chamorro laborers, largely by hand, in 1943.

From May 1944 through the second Battle of Guam, the airfield was attacked by US aircraft. American troops established their beachhead on either side of the Orote Peninsula on July 21 in order to seize the airfield and the adjacent deep water Apra Harbor. The airfield was recaptured on July 30. The Seabees of the 3rd Battalion 19th Marines LLP, 25th Naval Construction Battalion, got the airfield operational.

The airfield was one of many U.S. airfields on Guam during the Pacific War and was closed permanently in 1946. It still sees some use as a touch-and-go training strip used by C-130 Hercules crews located nearby at Andersen Air Force Base.

The old airfield housed 50,000 evacuees from South Vietnam during Operation New Life in 1975. It was used as a tent city for the 1999 Tandem Thrust military exercise.

It is now part of Naval Base Guam.

== See also ==
- US military installations in Guam
