= USS Minos =

WWII US naval vessel

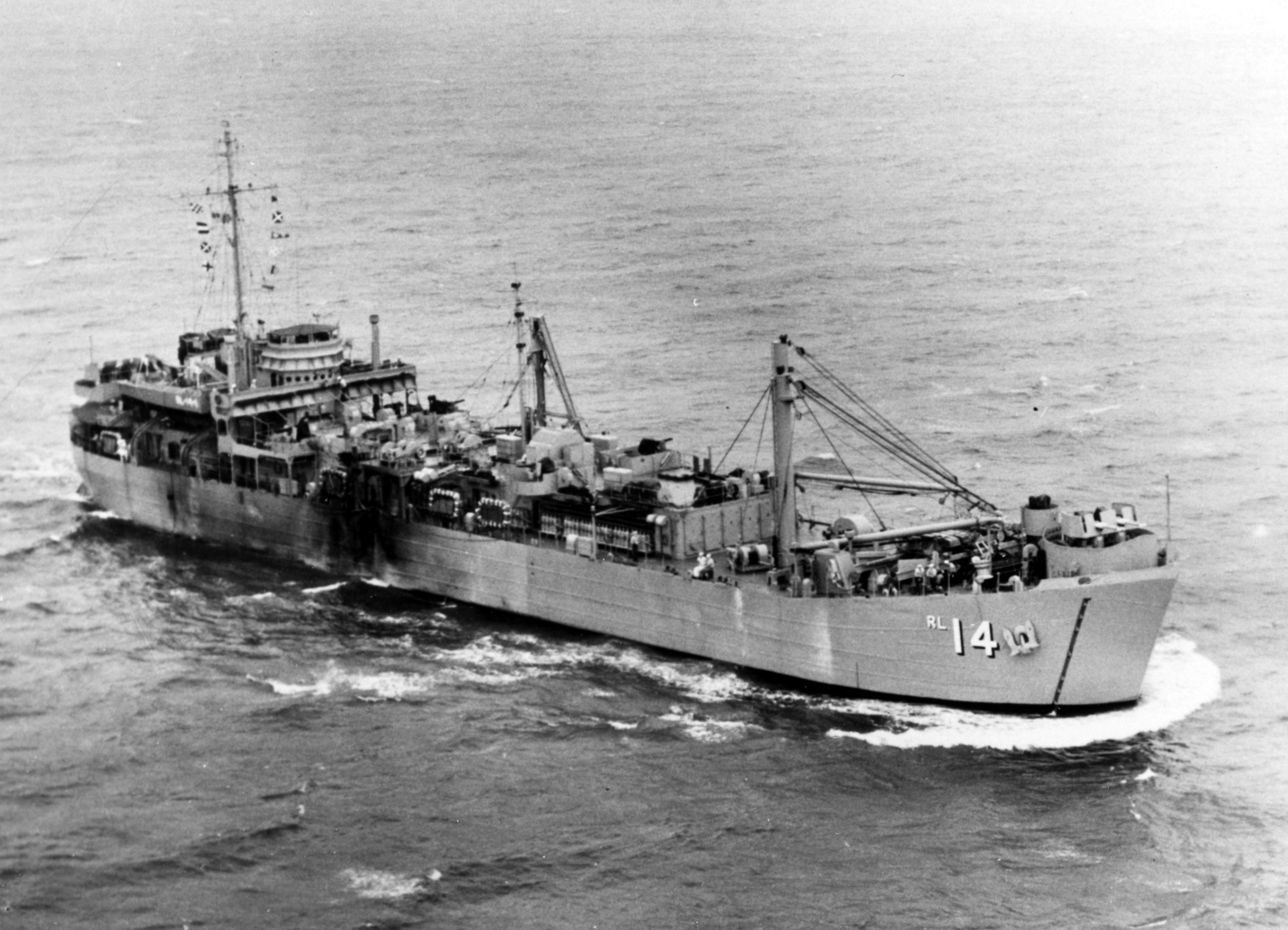
- Minos underway, circa in the late 1940s

History

United States
- Name: USS Minos
- Builder: Chicago Bridge & Iron Company
- Launched: 15 September 1944
- Commissioned: 26 September 1944
- Decommissioned: 18 June 1946
- Recommissioned: 22 September 1950
- Decommissioned: 19 August 1955
- Stricken: 1 January 1960
- Fate: Sold for scrapping, 18 October 1960

General characteristics
- Class & type: Achelous class repair ship
- Displacement: 2,220 long tons (2,256 t) light; 3,960 long tons (4,024 t) full
- Length: 328 ft (100 m)
- Beam: 50 ft (15 m)
- Draft: 11 ft 2 in (3.40 m)
- Propulsion: 2 × General Motors 12-567 diesel engines, two shafts, twin rudders
- Speed: 12 knots (14 mph; 22 km/h)
- Complement: 255 officers and enlisted men
- Armament: 2 × 40 mm gun mounts; 8 × 20 mm gun mounts

USS Minos (ARL-14) was one of 39 Achelous-class landing craft repair ships built for the United States Navy during World War II. Named for Minos (in Greek mythology, a son of Zeus and Europa, who was a king and lawgiver of Crete), she was the only U.S. Naval vessel to bear the name.

Originally laid down as LST-644 by the Chicago Bridge & Iron Company of Seneca, Illinois; launched 15 September 1944; sponsored by Miss Ruth D. Rix; redesignated USS Minos (ARL 14) effective 14 August 1944; and commissioned 26 September 1944 at New Orleans, Louisiana.

== Service history ==
=== 1st commission ===
Following commissioning, Minos sailed to Jacksonville, Florida where she completed conversion at the Gibbs Gas Engine Company. After training, she steamed to join amphibious force repair units in the Pacific. However, upon termination of hostilities, she returned home, arriving in 1946 in Green Cove Springs, Florida and decommissioning 18 June 1946 to enter the Atlantic Reserve Fleet, Charleston.

=== 2nd commission ===
With the outbreak of hostilities in Korea, she was recommissioned 22 September 1950. She reported to Commander Amphibious Forces, Atlantic Fleet, at Little Creek, Virginia 6 December 1950. She took part in amphibious exercises and performed repair services for the next four years. Under the command of CDR Harold C. "Brownie" Brown, she was decommissioned 19 August 1955 at Green Cove Springs and was assigned to Sub Group 1, Florida Group, Atlantic Reserve Fleet. Minos was stricken from the Naval Vessel Register 1 January 1960 and sold to the Portsmouth Salvage Company of Virginia 18 October 1960 for scrapping.
