= USS Bellona =

USN landing craft repair ship

History

United States
- Name: USS Bellona
- Builder: Chicago Bridge and Iron Company
- Laid down: 27 December 1944
- Launched: 26 March 1945
- Commissioned: 28 July 1945
- Stricken: 5 June 1946
- Fate: Grounded, 1 December 1945; Declared unsalvageable & destroyed with explosives, 14 May 1946

General characteristics
- Class & type: Achelous-class repair ship
- Displacement: 2,220 long tons (2,256 t) light; 3,960 long tons (4,024 t) full
- Length: 328 ft (100 m)
- Beam: 50 ft (15 m)
- Draft: 11 ft 2 in (3.40 m)
- Propulsion: 2 × General Motors 12-567 diesel engines, two shafts, twin rudders
- Speed: 12 knots (14 mph; 22 km/h)
- Complement: 253 officers and enlisted men
- Armament: 2 × quad 40 mm guns (Mark 51 director); 2 × twin 40 mm guns (Mark 51 director); 6 × twin 20 mm guns

USS Bellona (ARL-32) was one of 39 Achelous-class landing craft repair ships built for the United States Navy during World War II. Named for Bellona (a Roman goddess of war variously identified as the sister, daughter, and wife of Mars), she was the only U.S. Naval vessel to bear the name.

Originally laid down as LST-1136 on 27 December 1944 at Seneca, Illinois by the Chicago Bridge & Iron Works; launched on 26 March 1945; sponsored by Miss Huberta Jean Malsie; placed in reduced commission on 6 April 1945 for the voyage to Baltimore for conversion to a landing craft repair ship (ARL); decommissioned at Baltimore on 27 April 1945; converted by the Bethlehem Steel Key Highway Shipyard; and placed in full commission on 28 July 1945.

== Service history ==
Bellona departed Baltimore on 6 August 1945 for shakedown training in Chesapeake Bay. After post shakedown repairs at the Norfolk Navy Yard, she got underway for the Pacific Ocean on 5 September. The ship arrived in the Canal Zone on 12 September, transited the canal, and headed for San Diego on the 14th. She stood out of San Diego on 11 October, stopped briefly at Pearl Harbor, and then headed on to the Bonins on 31 October. Bellona arrived at Iwo Jima on 14 November and began duty as station repair ship there. Bellona went hard aground on the north side of Kama Rock on 1 December 1945. After the failure of several attempts to refloat her, Bellona proved unsalvageable. Finally, after all salvageable equipment had been removed, she was destroyed with explosives on 14 May 1946. Her name was struck from the Naval Vessel Register on 5 June 1946.
