= USS LST-317 =

1943 LST-1-class tank landing ship

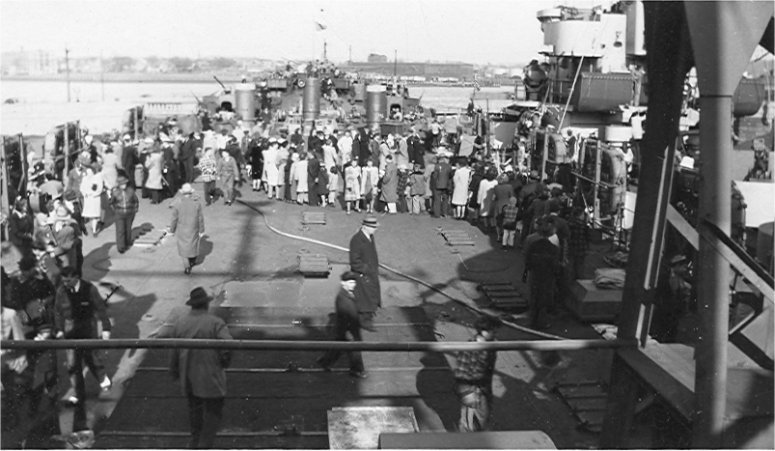
- LST-317 with visitors aboard, likely on the date of commissioning at New York Navy Yard, 6 February 1943

History

United States
- Name: USS LST-317
- Builder: New York Navy Yard
- Laid down: 15 October 1942
- Launched: 28 January 1943
- Commissioned: 6 February 1943
- Decommissioned: 18 May 1945
- Stricken: 12 March 1946
- Fate: Sold for scrap, 22 January 1947

General characteristics
- Class & type: LST-1 class tank landing ship
- Displacement: 1,625 long tons (1,651 t) light; 4,080 long tons (4,145 t) full
- Length: 328 ft (100 m)
- Beam: 50 ft (15 m)
- Draft: Unloaded : 2 ft 4 in (0.71 m) bow; 7 ft 6 in (2.29 m) stern; Loaded : 8 ft 2 in (2.49 m) bow; 14 ft 1 in (4.29 m) stern
- Propulsion: 2 × General Motors 12-567 diesel engines, two shafts, twin rudders
- Speed: 12 knots (14 mph; 22 km/h)
- Boats & landing craft carried: Six LCVPs
- Troops: 14 officers, 131 enlisted men
- Complement: 9 officers, 120 enlisted men
- Armament: 2 × twin 40 mm gun mounts (Mark 51 director); 4 × single 40 mm gun mounts; 12 × single 20 mm gun mounts

Service record
- Operations: World War II; Operation Husky; Operation Avalanche; Operation Overlord
- Awards: 3 battle stars

USS LST-317 was one of 390 tank landing ships (LSTs) built for the United States Navy during World War II.

LST-317 was laid down on 15 October 1942 at the New York Navy Yard; launched on 28 January 1943; sponsored by Mrs. Florence Whitehouse; and commissioned on 6 February 1943.

== Service history ==
During World War II, LST-317 was assigned to the European theater and participated in the Sicilian occupation (July 1943), Salerno landings (September 1943), and Invasion of Normandy (June 1944).

Upon her return to the United States, she was decommissioned on 18 May 1945 for conversion to landing craft repair ship USS Conus (ARL-44) at the New York Navy Yard. The conversion was canceled 12 September 1945 and the ship reverted to LST-317; she was struck from the Naval Vessel Register on 12 March 1946. On 22 January 1947 the tank landing ship was sold to A. G. Schoonmaker for scrapping.

LST-317 earned three battle stars for World War II service.

== See also ==
- List of United States Navy LSTs
