= USS Minotaur =

WWII US naval vessel

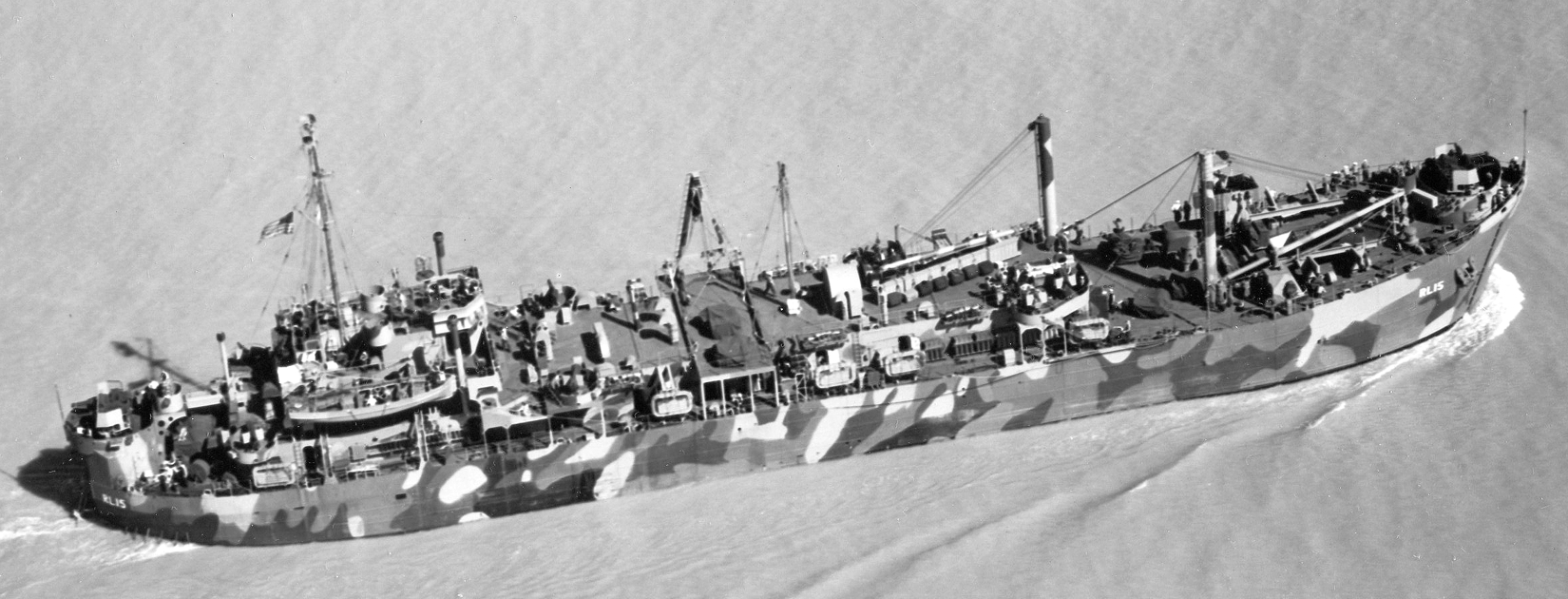

History

United States
- Name: USS Minotaur
- Builder: Chicago Bridge & Iron Company
- Laid down: 20 June 1944
- Launched: 20 September 1944
- Commissioned: 30 September 1944
- Decommissioned: 26 February 1947
- Recommissioned: 14 June 1951
- Decommissioned: 3 October 1955
- Fate: Loaned to the Republic of Korea

South Korea
- Name: ROKS Duk Soo
- Acquired: 1955

General characteristics
- Class & type: Achelous class repair ship
- Displacement: 2,220 long tons (2,256 t) light; 3,960 long tons (4,024 t) full
- Length: 328 ft (100 m)
- Beam: 50 ft (15 m)
- Draft: 11 ft 2 in (3.40 m)
- Propulsion: 2 × General Motors 12-567 diesel engines, two shafts, twin rudders
- Speed: 12 knots (14 mph; 22 km/h)
- Complement: 253 officers and enlisted men
- Armament: 2 × 40 mm gun mounts; 8 × 20 mm gun mounts

Service record
- Operations: World War II
- Awards: 1 battle star

USS Minotaur (ARL-15) was one of 39 Achelous-class landing craft repair ships built for the United States Navy during World War II. Named for the Minotaur (the mythological monster of Crete, half man half bull, who was confined in the Labyrinth), she was the only U.S. Naval vessel to bear the name.

Originally laid down as LST-645 by the Chicago Bridge & Iron Company of Seneca, Illinois 20 June 1944; redesignated ARL-15 on 14 August 1944; launched 20 September 1944; placed in ferry commission 30 September for conversion at Mobile, Alabama; and commissioned as USS Minotaur (ARL 15) 26 February 1945.

== Service history ==
=== 1st commission ===
Completing shakedown in March 1945 at the Amphibious Training Base, Panama City, Florida, Minotaur returned to Mobile to load steelplate and marine engines before departing for the Pacific. Steaming via the Marshall and Caroline Island groups, she anchored Buckner Bay, Okinawa on 4 June 1945. Having arrived during the final stage in the capture of this Japanese bastion, she remained at Okinawa through the end of the War and until 12 December 1945, when she sailed her landing craft repair facilities to Iwo Jima. Making two voyages to Chichi Jima, Bonin Islands, she served in the area a month and a half before heading home. Transiting the Panama Canal 10 April 1946, Minotaur entered the Mississippi River eight days later and moored in New Orleans. In June 1946, Minotaur arrived at Orange, Texas and joined the 16th Fleet. She decommissioned 26 February 1947.

=== 2nd commission ===
During the Korean War, Minotaur recommissioned 14 June 1951. Assigned to Mine Squadron 8 and home ported at Charleston, South Carolina, for the next four years she repaired minesweepers and net layers. She made working visits to Panama City and Yorktown, Virginia and maintained sea readiness during training periods in the Chesapeake Bay operating area. Minotaur departed coastal waters only once for a short Caribbean tour early in 1953 before being made available for foreign duty under the Military Assistance Program two years later.

At New York 3 October 1955 Minotaur decommissioned and was loaned to the Republic of Korea, where she served the Republic of Korea Navy as ROKS Duk Soo (ARL 1).

Minotaur received one battle star for World War II service.
