= USS Stentor =

1944 LST-542-class tank landing ship

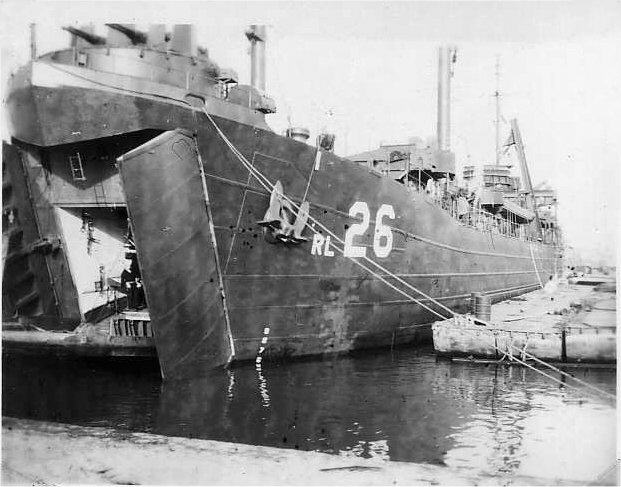
- USS Stentor (ARL-26)

History

United States
- Name: LST-858; Stentor
- Namesake: Stentor
- Builder: Chicago Bridge & Iron Company, Seneca, Illinois
- Laid down: 21 September 1944
- Launched: 11 November 1944
- Commissioned: 22 December 1944
- Decommissioned: 9 January 1945
- Recommissioned: 28 April 1945
- Decommissioned: December 1947
- Stricken: 1 July 1960
- Fate: Sold for scrap, 23 January 1961

General characteristics
- Displacement: 4,100 long tons (4,200 t) (full); 2,220 long tons (2,260 t) (light)
- Length: 328 ft 0 in (100.0 m)
- Beam: 50 ft 0 in (15.2 m)
- Draft: 11 ft 2 in (3.4 m)
- Propulsion: Two General Motors 12-567 diesel engines, two shafts, twin rudders
- Speed: 12 knots (22 km/h)
- Complement: 255 officers and enlisted men
- Armament: Two quad 40 mm AA gun mounts w/Mk-51 directors, two twin 40 mm AA gun mounts w/Mk-51 directors, six twin 20 mm AA gun mounts

USS Stentor (ARL-26) was one of 39 Achelous-class landing craft repair ships built for the United States Navy during World War II. Named for Stentor (a Greek herald in the Trojan War noted for his loud, "stentorian" voice), she was the only U.S. Naval vessel to bear the name.

== Construction ==
Originally projected as a tank landing ship, LST-858, Stentor was redesignated a landing craft repair ship on 14 August 1944; laid down at Seneca, Illinois on 21 September 1944, by the Chicago Bridge & Iron Company; launched on 11 November 1944; and commissioned on 22 December 1944.

== Service history ==
Stentor moved down the Mississippi River after commissioning and arrived at New Orleans on Christmas Eve. She departed the South Pass on 2 January 1945 and arrived in Mobile, Alabama on the following day. Stentor decommissioned at Mobile on 9 January and began conversion to a landing craft repair ship. She recommissioned on 28 April, and completed fitting out and shakedown training in May. On 4 June, she reported for duty with the Pacific Fleet at Coco Solo, the western terminus of the Panama Canal. Three days later, Stentor headed for the California coast. She loaded pontoons at Port Hueneme, near Los Angeles, between 20 and 25 June, then sailed for San Francisco. She stopped there on 27 June, and headed for Hawaii. The landing craft repair ship reached Pearl Harbor on 16 July, and there she remained through the waning days of World War II and into the fall of 1945.

On 20 October 1945, she departed the harbor and shaped a course for the Far East. Stentor stopped at Guam, in the Marianas, on 3 November and arrived in Shanghai, China, three days before Christmas. She served in China until 6 October 1946, when she departed Qingdao for the United States. One month later, she entered port at San Pedro, Los Angeles. For a little more than a year, she operated on the west coast, but spent most of her time in port at San Diego, where she was decommissioned and placed in the Pacific Reserve Fleet in December 1947. Stentor remained out of commission, in reserve, until 1 July 1960 when her name was struck from the Naval Vessel Register. On 23 January 1961, her hulk was sold to the Diesel Parts Corporation of New York City for scrapping.

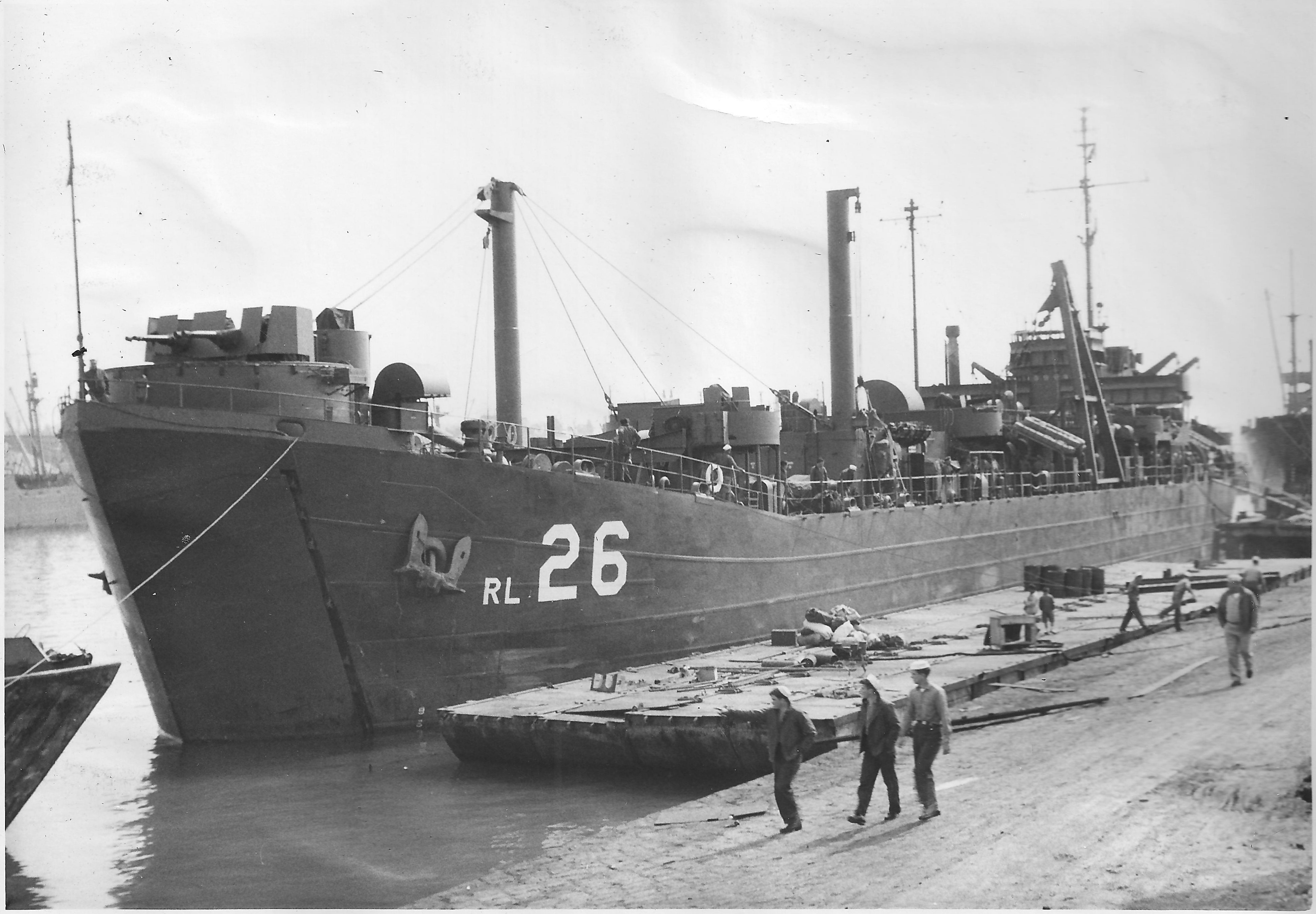
USS Stentor ARL-26 c. 1946 at dock.
