= USS Tantalus =

1945 Achelous-class repair ship

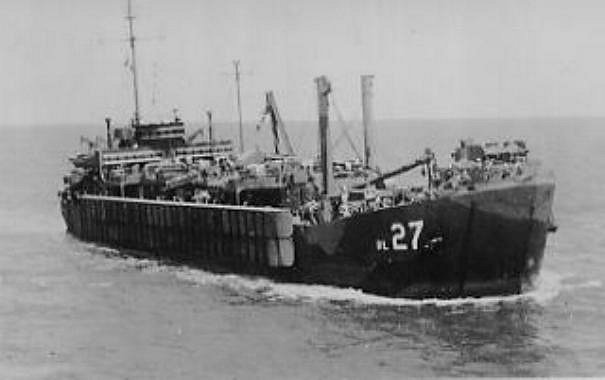
- Tantalus underway. Note the pontoon causeway secured to her starboard side.

History

United States
- Name: USS Tantalus
- Builder: Chicago Bridge and Iron Company
- Laid down: 10 October 1944
- Launched: 2 January 1945
- Commissioned: 13 January 1945
- Decommissioned: 18 January 1947
- Stricken: 7 February 1947

General characteristics
- Class & type: Achelous class repair ship
- Displacement: 2,220 long tons (2,256 t) light; 3,960 long tons (4,024 t) full
- Length: 328 ft (100 m)
- Beam: 50 ft (15 m)
- Draft: 11 ft 2 in (3.40 m)
- Propulsion: 2 × General Motors 12-567 diesel engines, two shafts, twin rudders
- Speed: 12 knots (14 mph; 22 km/h)
- Complement: 254 officers and enlisted men
- Armament: 2 × quad 40 mm guns (Mark 51 director); 2 × twin 40 mm guns (Mark 51 director); 6 × twin 20 mm guns

USS Tantalus (ARL-27) was one of 39 Achelous-class landing craft repair ships built for the United States Navy during World War II. Named for Tantalus (a legendary king of Lydia condemned to stand in a pool of water up to his chin and beneath fruit-laden boughs only to have the water or fruit recede at each attempt to drink or eat), she was the only U.S. Naval vessel to bear the name.

Originally laid down as LST-1117 on 10 October 1944 at Seneca, Illinois by the Chicago Bridge and Iron Company; launched on 2 January 1945; sponsored by Mrs. Angeline Colomone; and commissioned on 13 January 1945.

== Service history ==
Following her conversion into a landing craft repair ship at Jacksonville, Florida by the Gibbs Engine Works, she conducted her shakedown cruise in the Hampton Roads area. Tantalus departed Davisville, Rhode Island and headed for the Panama Canal Zone. She arrived at Coco Solo on 29 July; was assigned to Service Forces, Pacific Fleet; and then was ordered to proceed via San Diego to Hawaii. Tantalus stood out of San Diego on 14 August as whistles and sirens of the city proclaimed the Japanese surrender. She called at Pearl Harbor, Eniwetok, and Guam before reaching San Pedro Bay, Leyte on 11 October. She served there as tender and repair ship for landing craft until 28 March 1946 when she headed for China. Tantalus operated at Shanghai and Hankow until late July when she got underway for Okinawa. She remained in the Ryukyus from 5 August to 31 October when she began a return voyage to China. After calling at Qingdao, the ship arrived at Shanghai on 22 December 1946.

Tantalus was decommissioned in China on 18 January 1947 and released to the Foreign Liquidation Commission for further transfer to the United Nations Relief and Rehabilitation Administration for disposal. Tantalus was struck from the Naval Vessel Register on 7 February 1947. Her final fate is unknown.

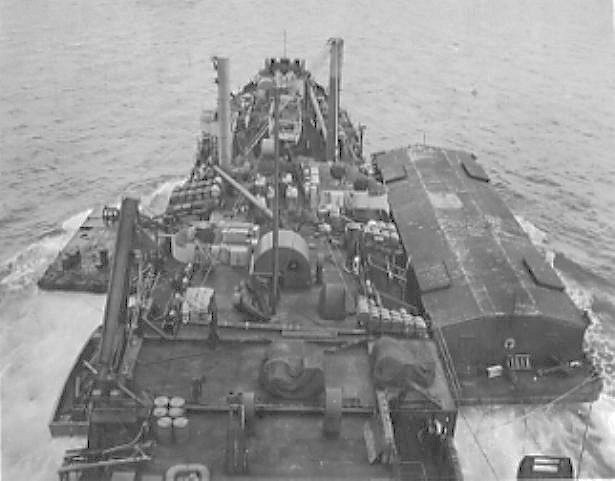
USS Tantalus (ARL-27) looking forward while underway en route to Guam with barges secured to both port and starboard sides, date unknown.
