= USS Achelous =

1942 LST-1-class tank landing ship

- USS Achelous (ARL-1), date and location unknown.

History

United States
- Name: Achelous
- Laid down: 15 August 1942
- Launched: 25 November 1942
- Commissioned: 2 April 1943
- Decommissioned: January 1947
- Stricken: 1 June 1973
- Fate: Sold for scrapping 21 January 1974

General characteristics
- Class & type: Achelous-class repair ship
- Displacement: 4,100 tons
- Length: 328 ft (100 m)
- Beam: 50 ft (15 m)
- Draft: 11 ft 2 in (3 m)
- Speed: 11.6 kn (21.5 km/h)
- Complement: 255 officers and enlisted men
- Armament: 1 × 3 in (76 mm)/50 cal gun, 8 × Bofors 40 mm guns, 8 × Oerlikon 20 mm cannons

USS Achelous (ARL-1) was one of 39 tank landing ships converted into landing craft repair ships for service in the United States Navy during World War II. The lead ship in her class, she was named for the Greek god Achelous, the only U.S. Naval vessel to bear the name.

She was laid down as the unnamed LST-10 on 15 August 1942, at Pittsburgh, Pennsylvania by the Dravo Corporation; launched on 25 November 1942; sponsored by Mrs. George F. Wolfe, the wife of the chief engineer of Dravo; named Achelous and redesignated ARL-1 on 13 January 1943; and commissioned on 2 April 1943, at Baltimore, Maryland.

== Service history ==
Achelous held shakedown in Chesapeake Bay, stopped at Norfolk, Virginia, on 22 April, to take on supplies on 28 April, and sailed the same day with a convoy bound for North Africa. She paused in Bermuda from 2–9 May, and arrived in Oran, Algeria on 26 May.

Achelous moved to Bizerte, Tunisia, on 1 June, and remained there until 14 July, providing varied services to landing craft. Following the Allied invasion of Sicily, Achelous moored at Licata, Sicily from 15 July – 4 August, to perform repair work. She returned to Bizerte, on 15 August, and for the next three days endured two enemy air raids. During the second raid, Achelous' guns assisted in downing two German planes. Achelous spent one week in mid-September at Palermo, Sicily. She got underway with convoy UGS 19 on 16 October, reached Port Said, Egypt, on 23 October, and transited the Suez Canal on 25 October. The repair ship then headed for Massawa, Italian Eritrea, where she arrived on 31 October. The next day, she entered a British-owned floating drydock at Massawa. The ship left the drydock on 4 November and got underway for India. She arrived at Calcutta in early December and spent approximately one month providing services in the China Burma India theater.

In early 1944, Achelous left India and sailed to the Mediterranean to support operations along the Italian coast. She remained at these duties for seven months. In July, the landing craft repair ship began preparations for the assault on the southern coast of France. In mid-August, she dropped anchor off the French coast and set up a pontoon drydock to service landing craft used in the invasion. These duties occupied her through most of 1944. Late in the year, the repair ship was reassigned to the Pacific Ocean and began her voyage via the Strait of Gibraltar and the Panama Canal to her new area of operations. She transited the Panama Canal on 7 March 1945 and proceeded to Eniwetok, where she arrived on 24 April. Achelous then was assigned to support the invasion and occupation of Okinawa, her last combat operation of World War II. Following the War, Achelous returned to the west coast. She was placed out of commission in reserve in January 1947, and berthed in the Columbia River Group of the Pacific Reserve Fleet. Achelous' name was struck from the Naval Vessel Register on 1 June 1973, and the ship was sold on 21 January 1974, to Overseas Shipyard, Ltd. of Hong Kong for scrapping.

== Awards ==
Achelous earned two battle stars for World War II service.
