= USS Chimaera =

Achelous-class landing craft repair ship

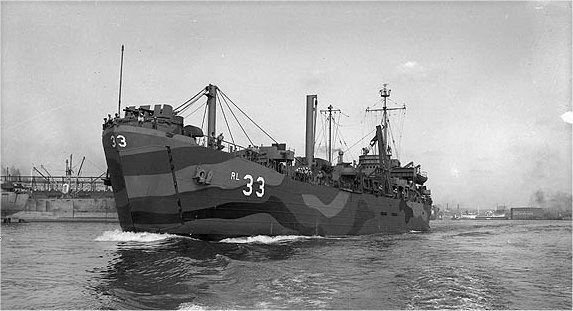
- Chimaera underway in Baltimore harbor, c. 1945

History

United States
- Name: USS Chimaera
- Builder: Chicago Bridge & Iron Company
- Laid down: 3 January 1945
- Launched: 30 March 1945
- Commissioned: 7 August 1945
- Decommissioned: 8 March 1948
- Stricken: July 1961
- Identification: IMO number: 7431507
- Fate: Sold March 1964

General characteristics
- Class & type: Achelous class repair ship
- Displacement: 2,220 long tons (2,256 t) light; 4,100 long tons (4,166 t) full
- Length: 328 ft (100 m)
- Beam: 50 ft (15 m)
- Draft: 11 ft 2 in (3.40 m)
- Propulsion: 2 × General Motors 12-567 diesel engines, two shafts, twin rudders
- Speed: 12 knots (14 mph; 22 km/h)
- Complement: 253 officers and enlisted men
- Armament: 2 × quad 40 mm guns (Mark 51 director); 2 × twin 40 mm guns (Mark 51 director); 6 × twin 20 mm guns

USS Chimaera (ARL-33) was one of 39 Achelous-class landing craft repair ships built for the United States Navy during World War II. Named for the Chimaera (a mythological character, symbolic of the destructive forces of nature), she was the only U.S. Naval vessel to bear the name.

Originally planned as LST-1137, the ship was redesignated ARL-33 14 August 1944. Her design was a modification of the LST Mk.2. Other repair ships and tenders followed her precedent.

== Service history ==
Chimaera was launched 30 March 1945 by Chicago Bridge and Iron Co., Seneca, Ill., sponsored by Mrs. D. L. Mahoney. She was placed in partial commission 11 April 1945 and decommissioned 7 May 1945 for conversion at Baltimore, Md.. She was commissioned in full on 7 August 1945. Sailing from Norfolk, Virginia 18 September 1945, Chimaera arrived at Green Cove Springs, Florida 21 September to serve as flagship for Commander, St. John's River Reserve Group, Atlantic Fleet until 1 March 1946. On 29 April she cleared for San Pedro, California, arriving 21 May. Local operations were conducted until 17 September when she got underway for the western Pacific. She called at Pearl Harbor and arrived at Qingdao, China 23 October to provide services to the 7th Fleet. On 14 October 1947 she departed Qingdao for San Pedro. Chimaera was placed out of commission in reserve 8 March 1948. Laid up at the Pacific Reserve Fleet, San Diego Group, she was struck from the Naval Vessel Register in July 1961 and sold in March 1964.
