= USS Gordius =

Landing craft repair ship of the US Navy

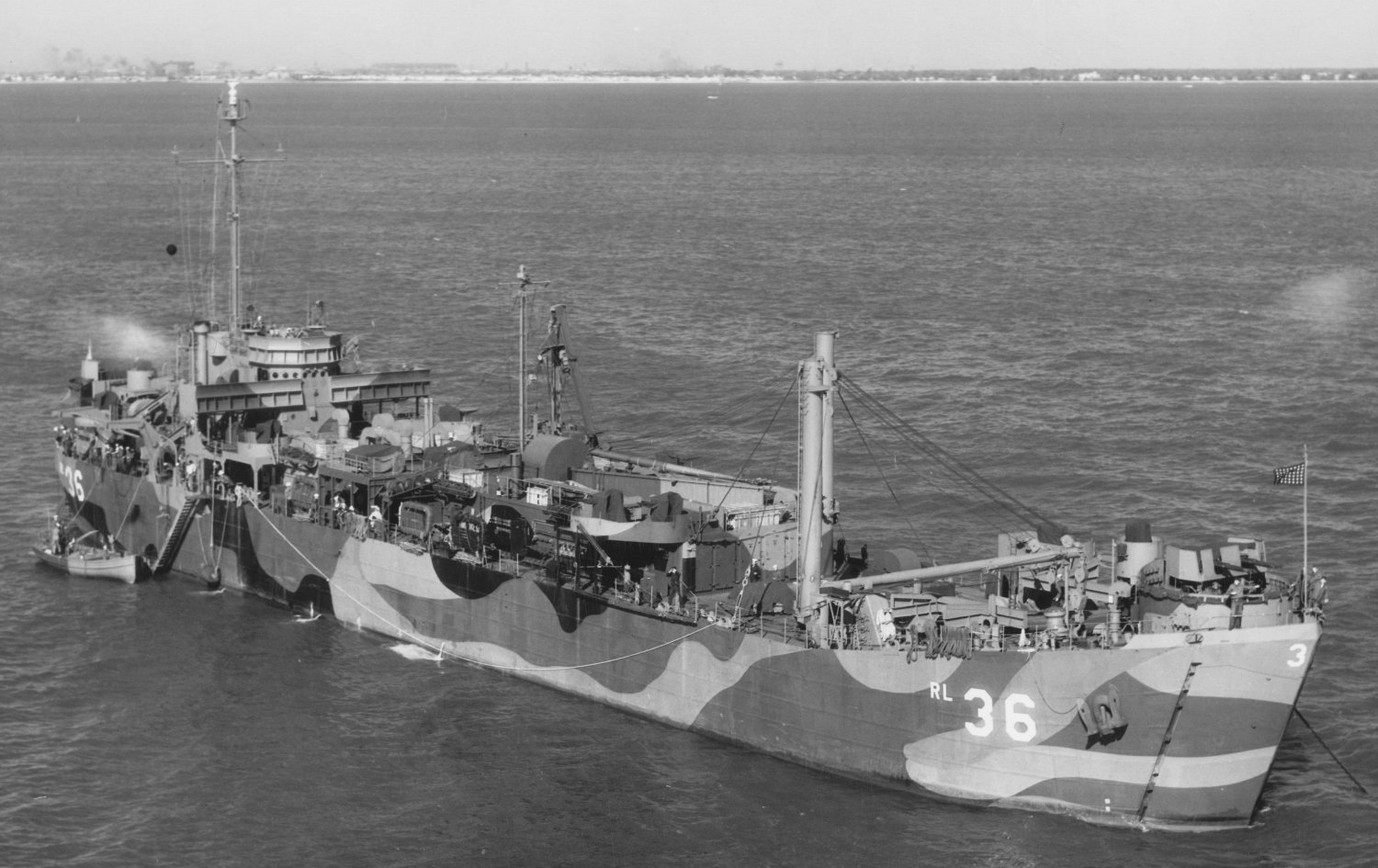

History

United States
- Name: LST-1145
- Builder: Chicago Bridge & Iron Company, Seneca, Illinois
- Laid down: 5 February 1945
- Launched: 7 May 1945
- Sponsored by: Mrs. Helen H. Davis
- Commissioned: 18 May 1945
- Decommissioned: 11 June 1945
- Refit: converted to landing craft repair ship, Bethlehem Steel, Baltimore, June–September 1945
- Renamed: USS Gordius (ARL-36)
- Recommissioned: 14 September 1945
- Decommissioned: 21 December 1955
- Stricken: 1 February 1961
- Fate: Transferred to Iran, 7 September 1968

History

Iran
- Name: IIS Sohrab
- Namesake: Sohrab
- Acquired: 7 September 1968
- Fate: Sunk as target, 1974

General characteristics
- Class & type: Achelous-class repair ship
- Displacement: 2,220 long tons (2,256 t) light; 4,100 long tons (4,166 t) full
- Length: 328 ft (100 m)
- Beam: 50 ft (15 m)
- Draft: 11 ft 2 in (3.40 m)
- Propulsion: 2 × General Motors 12-567 diesel engines, two shafts, twin rudders
- Speed: 12 knots (14 mph; 22 km/h)
- Complement: 253 officers and enlisted men
- Armament: 2 × quad 40 mm guns (Mark 51 director); 2 × twin 40 mm guns (Mark 51 director); 6 × twin 20 mm guns

USS Gordius (ARL-36) was one of 39 Achelous-class landing craft repair ships built for the United States Navy during World War II. Named for Gordius (in mythology, first king of Phrygia), she was the only U.S. Naval vessel to bear the name.

Originally planned as LST-1145, was redesignated ARL-36 and named Gordius 27 October 1944 while building at Chicago Bridge & Iron Works, Seneca, Illinois. She was launched 7 May 1945 and sponsored by Mrs. Helen H. Davis. Placed in reduced commission 18 May 1945, the ship steamed to Baltimore, Maryland where she decommissioned 11 June. She was then converted to a landing craft repair vessel at the Key Shipyard, Bethlehem Steel Company. Gordius was placed in full commission 14 September 1945 at Baltimore.

== Service history ==
Operating out of Amphibious Base, Little Creek, Virginia Gordius took up a regular schedule of exercises in Chesapeake Bay, and along the Virginia-North Carolina coast, supporting the myriad landing craft during amphibious operations. She also participated in winter maneuvers in the Caribbean. The ship occasionally sailed to the north Atlantic, taking part in training exercises off NS Argentia, Newfoundland, and Labrador in 1948 and 1949. Gordius also was a member of the annual resupply convoy to Thule Air Base, Greenland (11 June–27 August 1952), drawing special praise for her repair of LST-938 during adverse weather on the operation.

Gordius continued her work in support of amphibious training until steaming into Green Cove Springs, Florida 10 November 1955. She decommissioned 21 December 1955 and was placed in reserve.

Taken out of reserve in early 1968, she was stricken from the Naval Vessel Register 1 February and loaned to Iran under the Military Assistance Program 7 September 1961, where she served as IIS Sohrab (ARL-11). She was sunk as a target in 1974.
