= USS Egeria =

1943 Achelous-class repair ship

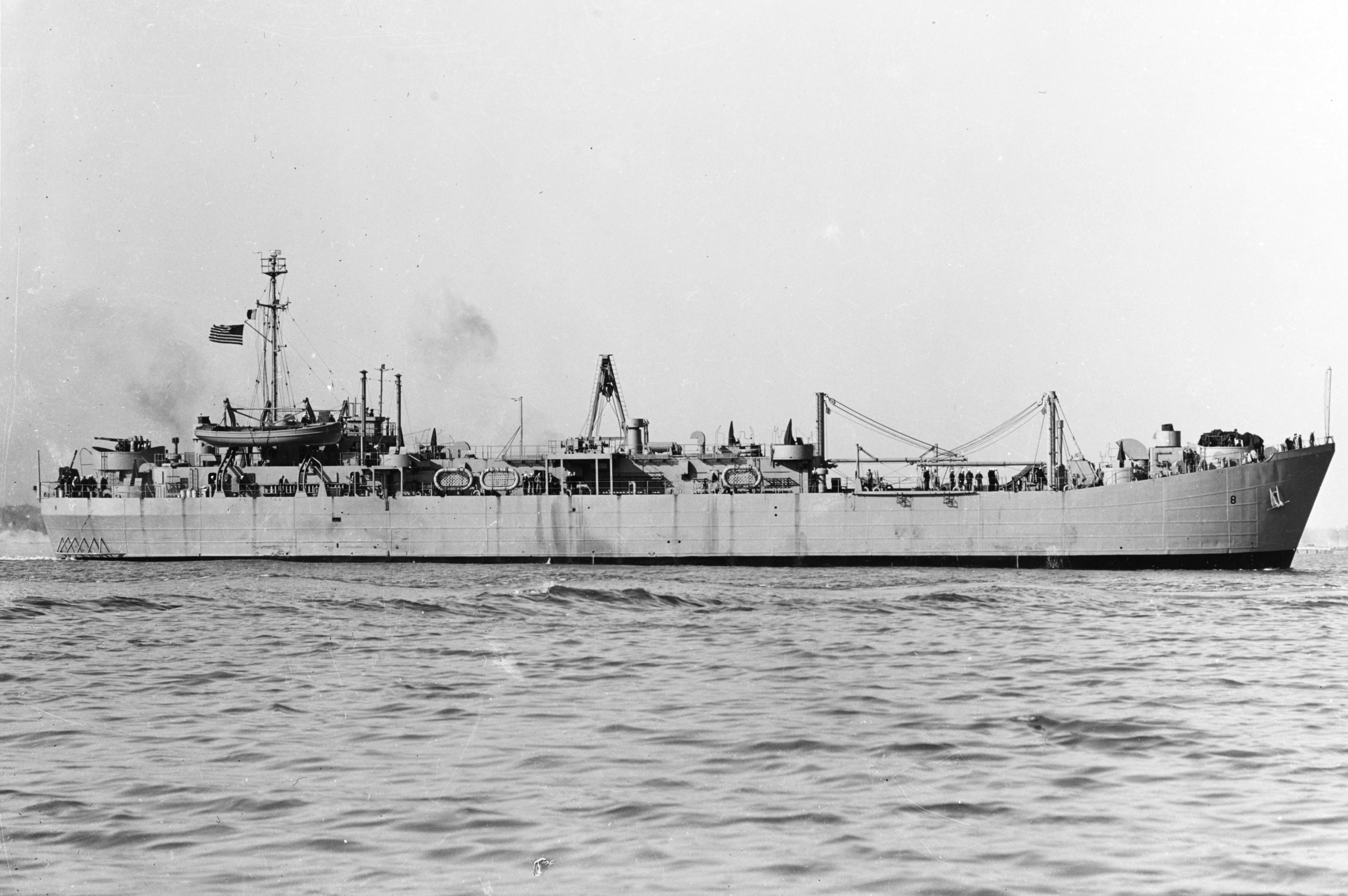
- USS Egeria (ARL-8) underway near Baltimore, MD., c. April 1944 after completion of conversion. Note the two short kingposts forward widely separated by empty deck space.

History

United States
- Name: USS Egeria
- Builder: Chicago Bridge & Iron Company, Seneca, Illinois
- Launched: 23 November 1943
- Commissioned: 30 March 1944
- Decommissioned: January 1947
- Fate: Scrapped, 1980

General characteristics
- Class & type: Achelous class repair ship
- Displacement: 2,220 long tons (2,256 t) light; 4,200 long tons (4,267 t) full
- Length: 328 ft (100 m)
- Beam: 50 ft (15 m)
- Draft: 11 ft 2 in (3.40 m)
- Propulsion: 2 × General Motors 12-567 diesel engines, two shafts, twin rudders
- Speed: 12 knots (14 mph; 22 km/h)
- Complement: 255 officers and enlisted men
- Armament: 2 × quad 40 mm guns; 2 × twin 40 mm guns; 6 × twin 20 mm guns

USS Egeria (ARL-8) was one of 39 Achelous-class landing craft repair ships built for the United States Navy during World War II. Named for Egeria (a fountain nymph in Roman mythology, and the wife of Numa Pompilius), she was the only U.S. Naval vessel to bear the name.

Originally laid down as LST-136; launched by the Chicago Bridge and Iron Works of Seneca, Illinois 23 November 1943; sponsored by Mrs. Delphine Z. Draut; and placed in reduced commission on 18 December 1943. She proceeded to Baltimore, Maryland, was decommissioned, converted to ARL-8, named Egeria on 3 November 1943 and recommissioned on 30 March 1944.

== Service history ==
After sailing through the Panama Canal to San Diego and taking on supplies, she departed for Pearl Harbor, and then to Eniwetok Lagoon where she remained from 21 June to 16 July 1944 repairing damaged ships in that area. On 17 July, she joined a task unit bound for Guam where she effected repairs to vessels, and thereafter proceeded to Saipan, Tinian, Leyte Gulf, Lingayen Gulf, Kerama Retto, and Okinawa, rendering her vital repair services to the ships of the fleet damaged by weather and battle. Following a period of overhaul, in June 1945 she proceeded to Saipan and returned to Pearl Harbor where she converted LCIs for service as transports.

Following decommissioning, she was placed in the Pacific Reserve Fleet in January 1947. Struck from the Naval Vessel Register and turned over to the Maritime Administration (MARAD) for disposal, she was sold by MARAD on 1 June 1980. Egeria was scrapped in 1980.
