= USS LST-350 =

1943 LST-1-class tank landing ship

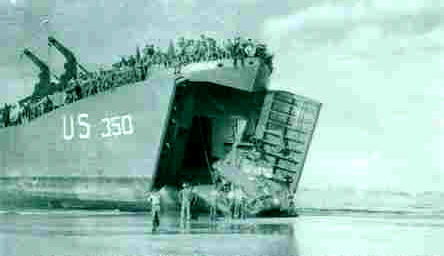
- LST-350 beached at Normandy

History

United States
- Name: USS LST-350
- Builder: Norfolk Navy Yard
- Laid down: 10 November 1942
- Launched: 7 February 1943
- Commissioned: 13 February 1943
- Decommissioned: 26 May 1945
- Stricken: 12 March 1946
- Fate: Sold to merchant service, 2 December 1946, scrapped 17 November 1959

General characteristics
- Class & type: LST-1 class tank landing ship
- Displacement: 1,625 long tons (1,651 t) light; 4,080 long tons (4,145 t) full
- Length: 328 ft (100 m)
- Beam: 50 ft (15 m)
- Draft: Unloaded; 2 ft 4 in (0.71 m) bow; 7 ft 6 in (2.29 m) stern; Loaded; 8 ft 2 in (2.49 m) bow; 14 ft 1 in (4.29 m) stern
- Propulsion: 2 × General Motors 12-567 diesel engines, two shafts, twin rudders
- Speed: 12 knots (14 mph; 22 km/h)
- Boats & landing craft carried: Six LCVPs
- Troops: 14 officers, 131 enlisted men
- Complement: 9 officers, 120 enlisted men
- Armament: 2 × twin 40 mm gun mounts (Mark 51 director); 4 × single 40 mm gun mounts; 12 × single 20 mm gun mounts

Service record
- Operations: World War II; Operation Husky; Operation Avalanche; Operation Overlord
- Awards: 3 battle stars

USS LST-350 was one of 390 tank landing ships (LSTs) built for the United States Navy during World War II.

LST-350 was laid down on 10 November 1942 at the Norfolk Navy Yard; launched on 7 February 1943; sponsored by Mrs. C. M. Terry; and commissioned on 13 February 1943.

== Service history ==
During World War II, LST-350 was assigned to the European theater and participated in the Sicilian occupation (July 1943), Salerno landings (September 1943), and Invasion of Normandy (June 1944).

LST-350 was redesignated landing craft repair ship USS Chandra (ARL-46) on 25 May 1945, but the redesignation was subsequently cancelled. The ship was decommissioned on 26 May 1945 and struck from the Naval Vessel Register on 12 March 1946. On 2 December 1946 she was sold to the Suwannee Steam Ship Company of Charleston, South Carolina and converted for merchant service.

LST-350 earned three battle stars for World War II service.

== See also ==
- List of United States Navy LSTs
