= USS Amphitrite (ARL-29) =

1945 Achelous-class repair ship

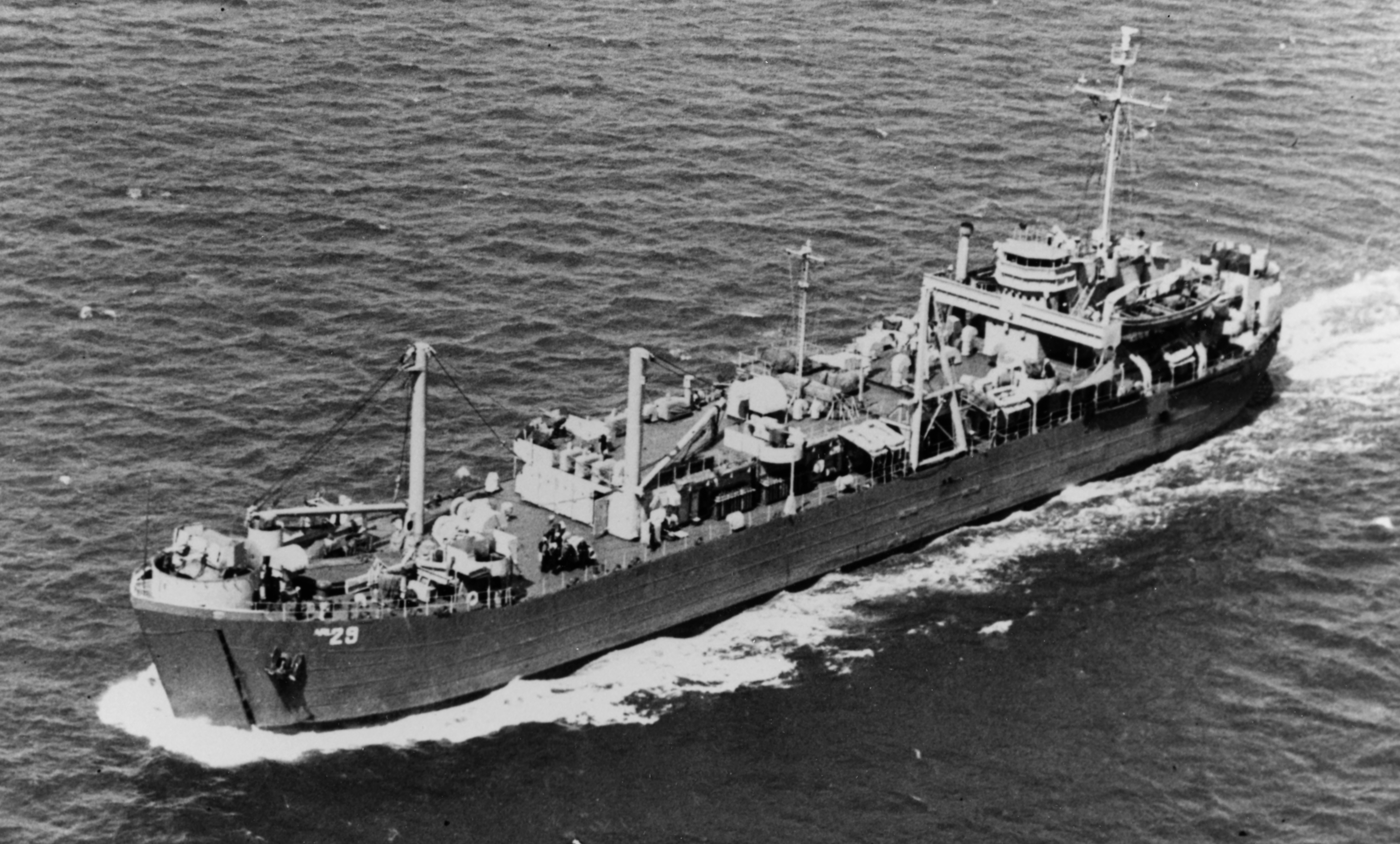

History

United States
- Name: USS Amphitrite
- Builder: Chicago Bridge and Iron Company
- Laid down: 6 November 1944
- Launched: 1 February 1945
- Commissioned: 28 June 1945
- Decommissioned: 1 January 1947
- Stricken: 1 July 1961
- Fate: Sold, 16 April 1962

General characteristics
- Class & type: Achelous class repair ship
- Displacement: 2,220 long tons (2,256 t) light; 4,100 long tons (4,166 t) full
- Length: 328 ft (100 m)
- Beam: 50 ft (15 m)
- Draft: 11 ft 2 in (3.40 m)
- Propulsion: 2 × General Motors 12-567 diesel engines, two shafts, twin rudders
- Speed: 12 knots (14 mph; 22 km/h)
- Complement: 253 officers and enlisted men
- Armament: 2 × quad 40 mm guns (Mark 51 director); 2 × twin 40 mm guns (Mark 51 director); 6 × twin 20 mm guns

USS Amphitrite (ARL-29) was one of 39 Achelous-class landing craft repair ships built for the United States Navy during World War II. Named for Amphitrite (in Greek mythology, the wife of Poseidon and the daughter of Oceanus), she was the third U.S. Naval vessel to bear the name.

Originally laid down as LST-1124 on 6 November 1944 at Seneca, Illinois by the Chicago Bridge & Iron Works; launched on 1 February 1945; sponsored by Miss Lillie Williams Kidd; placed in reduced commission on 13 February 1945 for the voyage to Baltimore, Maryland where she was to be converted from a tank landing ship to a landing craft repair ship; decommissioned in Baltimore on 3 March 1945; converted by Bethlehem Steel's Key Highway Shipyard, and placed in full commission as USS Amphitrite (ARL-29) on 28 June 1945.

== Service history ==
Following a fortnight's shakedown training in Chesapeake Bay, she put to sea on 8 August 1945. She reached the Panama Canal on the 18th and arrived in Pearl Harbor on 27 September. Continuing across the Pacific with Task Unit (TU) 13.11.97, she reported to her first duty station, Buckner Bay, Okinawa, in October. The landing craft repair ship performed a myriad of repair duties there until mid-March 1946 when she was transferred to Apra Harbor, Guam. The vessel departed Guam on 9 June 1946 bound for China. Amphitrite arrived at Qingdao on 19 June, discharged much of her cargo there, and took on many replacement crewmen. She then settled into a repair routine in the inner harbor at Qingdao.

The ship remained in Qingdao (save for a round-trip voyage in July during which she towed USS APL-29 to Sasebo, Japan) until 24 September. On that day, the landing craft repair ship weighed anchor for Shanghai. She resumed her repair duties at that port until sometime in November when she got underway to return to the United States. She was placed out of commission at San Diego on 1 January 1947 and was berthed with that portion of the Pacific Reserve Fleet located there. Amphitrite remained in reserve until her name was struck from the Naval Vessel Register on 1 July 1961. On 16 April 1962 she was sold to River Equipment, Inc. of Memphis, Tennessee. Subsequently renamed TMT Biscayne in 1963, the ship's final fate is unknown.
