= Achelous-class repair ship =

1943 class of American repair ships

- USS Pandemus (ARL-18), a typical Achelous-class vessel.

Class overview
- Operators: United States Navy
- Built: 1943–1945
- In commission: 1943–1971
- Completed: 39
- Active: 0

General characteristics
- Type: Repair ship
- Displacement: 1,781–2,220 tons; 3960-4,100 tons laden.
- Length: 328 ft (100 m)
- Beam: 50 ft (15 m)
- Draft: 14 ft (4 m)
- Propulsion: Diesel engines, twin screws, 1,800 hp (1,300 kW)
- Speed: 11.62 kn (21.5 km/h)
- Complement: 255
- Armament: 40 mm mounts, 20 mm mounts, numbers variable.

The Achelous-class repair ship was a class of ship built by the US Navy during World War II.

As the United States gained experience in amphibious operations, it was realized that some sort of mobile repair facility would be useful for repairing the damage that frequently occurred to smaller vessels such as LCVP's (Landing Craft Vehicle/Personnel). The Auxiliary Repair Light (ARL) ship was designed to meet this need, and the Achelous class was the only class to receive this designation.

== Description ==
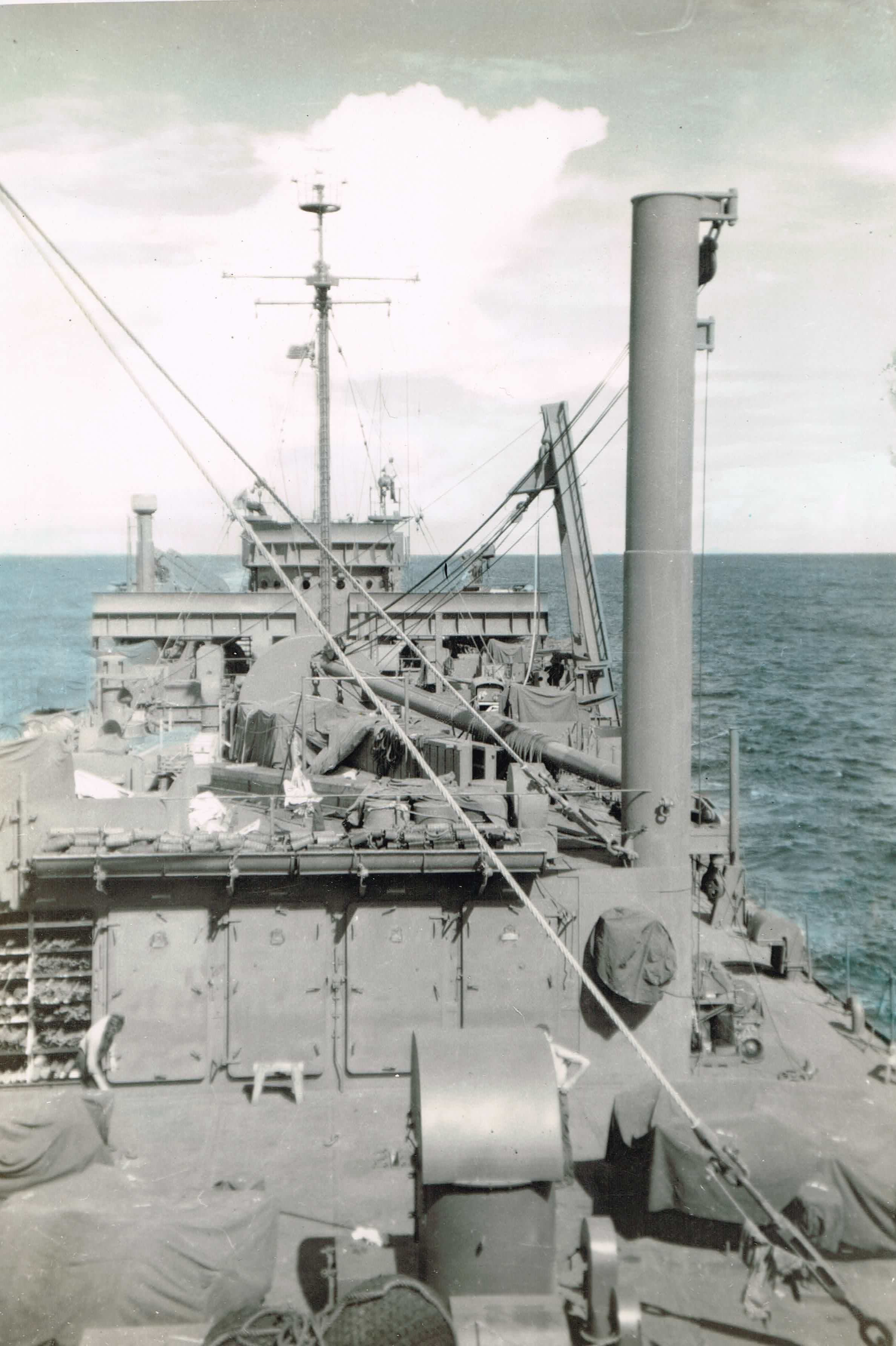
View from the conning tower of USS Typhon (ARL-28)

Achelous-class vessels were based on the same hull as LSTs (Landing Ship, Tank) which at the time were being produced in large numbers. This hull was thought to be ideal for a ship specializing in the repair of light craft, since it was not overly large and had a shallow draught which would enable it to maneuver into small harbors, rivers and inlets where it could service damaged boats and effect other repairs on location.

The conversion from an LST to an Achelous-class ARL was done mainly by converting the large interior tank deck into a number of different shops and storerooms. Two large cargo booms were added forward, and a large 60-ton A-frame boom added amidships. The wheelhouse/chart room deck was expanded, and a conning tower added. The first nine units of the class sealed the bow doors of the LST hull.

The ship's company consisted of the usual LST crew of deck, engineering and communications departments but in addition it had a supply department, plus a repair department consisting of machinery and engine repair, carpentry, electronics repair, and hull repair divisions, giving a ship's complement of approximately 250 officers and men in total. After the first nine units were built, the later units had a revised armament as well as retaining the opening bow doors.

== Operational history ==
During World War II, the Achelous-class vessels worked mostly on repairing damaged landing craft, but many continued in service after the war, working again on landing craft during the Korean War and on river craft during the Vietnam War.

In all, 39 Achelous-class repair ships were built between 1943 and 1945.

== Ships in Class ==
Hull no.	Ship	Keel laid	Launched	Commission	Decomm	Fate	Notes
ARL-1	Achelous	15 August 1942	25 November 1942	2 April 1943	1 January 1947	Sold for scrapping	Originally ordered as LST-10
ARL-2	Amycus	17 January 1943	2 April 1943	30 July 1943	15 November 1946	laid up Pacific Reserve Fleet, Columbia River Group, 15 November 1946, sold for scrapping, 13 August 1971	Originally ordered as LST-489
ARL-3	Agenor	24 January 1943	3 April 1943	20 August 1943	15 November 1946	transferred to France, through Mutual Defense Assistance Program, 2 March 1951; transferred to the Republic of China, 1957	Originally ordered as LST-490
ARL-4	Adonis	31 March 1943	14 June 1943	6 August 1943	11 October 1946	Sold to private interest, 14 October 1960	Originally ordered as LST-83
ARL-5	ARL-5	8 March 1943	28 May 1943	21 July 1943	19 July 1943	Transferred to the Royal Navy, 29 July 1943, Sold to Argentina, 20 August 1947; Sold 1967	Originally ordered as LST-81
ARL-6	ARL-6	25 March 1943	9 June 1943	26 July 1943	2 August 1943	Transferred to the Royal Navy, 2 August 1943, Sold to Argentina, 20 August 1947; Sold into merchant service, 1968	Originally ordered as LST-82
ARL-7	Atlas	3 June 1943	19 October 1943	15 November 1943	13 September 1946	Sold for scrapping, 18 September 1973	Originally ordered as LST-231, Recommissioned: 1 June 1951 through 13 April 1956
ARL-8	Egeria	19 June 1943	23 November 1943	30 March 1944	1 January 1947	Sold for scrapping, 18 September 1973	Originally ordered as "LST-136"
ARL-9	Endymion	23 August 1943	17 December 1943	9 May 1944	30 November 1946	Sold for commercial service, 1 September 1973	Originally ordered as LST-513
ARL-10	Coronis	3 May 1944	8 June 1944	28 November 1944	29 July 1946	Sold for commercial service, c. 1965	Originally ordered as LST-1003
ARL-11	Creon		24 August 1944	28 November 1944	8 June 1949	Unknown	Originally ordered as LST-1036
ARL-12	Poseidon	10 July 1944	24 August 1944	13 February 1945	30 November 1946	Unknown	Originally ordered as LST-1037
ARL-13	Menelaus	17 November 1944	20 December 1944	29 May 1945	5 June 1947	Laid up in the Atlantic Reserve Fleet, Green Cove Springs Group, Sold for commercial service, 28 October 1960	Originally ordered as LST-971
ARL-14	Minos	16 June 1944	15 September 1944	26 September 1944	18 June 1946	Sold for scrapping, 18 October 1960	Originally ordered as LST-644, Recommissioned: 22 September 1950 through 19 August 1955
ARL-15	Minotaur	20 June 1944	20 September 1944	30 September 1944	26 February 1947	Loaned to the Republic of Korea (1955), Fate: Unknown	Originally ordered as LST-645
ARL-16	Myrmidon	25 August 1944	28 September 1944	9 March 1945	7 July 1947	Sold, 21 December 1960	Originally ordered as LST-948
ARL-17	Numitor	19 September 1944	18 October 1944	3 April 1945	1 July 1947	Sold, and converted to a drydock	Originally ordered as LST-954
ARL-18	Pandemus	20 July 1944	10 October 1944	23 February 1945	23 September 1946	Sunk as a target, 1969	Originally ordered as LST-650, Recommissioned: 14 December 1951 through 30 September 1968
ARL-19	Patroclus	22 September 1944	22 October 1944	17 April 1945	2 October 1946	Transferred to Turkey, 15 November 1952, Scrapped, September 1993	Originally ordered as LST-955
ARL-20	Pentheus	29 September 1944	22 December 1944	7 June 1945	20 April 1946	Sold, 13 June 1960	Originally ordered as "LST-1115"
ARL-21	Proserpine	2 October 1944	28 December 1944	31 May 1945	18 January 1947	Sold, 26 September 1960	Originally ordered as LST-1116, Recommissioned: 27 October 1950 through 24 May 1956
ARL-22	Romulus	17 October 1944	15 November 1944	10 May 1945	12 May 1947	Laid up in the Pacific Reserve Fleet, Columbia River Group, Transferred to the Philippine Navy, November 1961, fate: unknown	Originally ordered as LST-962
ARL-23	Satyr	16 August 1944	13 November 1944	27 November 1944	1 August 1947	Transferred to South Vietnam, 30 September 1971, Transferred to the Philippines, 1975, scrapped, 2004	Originally ordered as LST-852, Recommissioned: 8 September 1950 through 17 April 1956 and 15 February 1968 through 30 September 1971
ARL-24	Sphinx	20 October 1944	7 March 1945	10 May 1945	26 May 1947	Laid up in the Pacific Reserve Fleet, San Diego Group, Towed for scrapping, 1 December 2007	Originally ordered as LST-963 Recommissioned: 3 November 1950 through 31 January 1956, Recommissioned: 16 December 1967 through 30 September 1971 and 26 July 1985 through 16 June 1989
ARL-26	Stentor	21 September 1944	11 November 1944	22 December 1944	9 January 1945	Sold for scrap, 23 January 1961	Originally ordered as LST-858, Recommissioned: 28 April 1945 through 1 December 1947
ARL-27	Tantalus	10 October 1944	2 January 1945	13 January 1945	18 January 1947	Released to the Foreign Liquidation Commission for further transfer to the United Nations Relief, and Rehabilitation Administration for disposal, fate unknown.	Originally ordered as LST-1117
ARL-28	Typhon	17 October 1944	5 January 1945	18 January 1945	29 March 1947	Sold to private interest, 23 February 1961	Originally ordered as LST-1118
ARL-29	Amphitrite	6 November 1944	1 February 1945	28 June 1945	1 January 1947	Sold, 16 April 1962	Originally ordered as LST-1124
ARL-30	Askari	8 December 1944	2 March 1945	15 March 1945	9 April 1945	Sold to Indonesian Navy, 1971	Originally ordered as LST-1131, Recommissioned: 23 July 1945 through 1 September 1971
ARL-31	Bellerophon	12 December 1944	7 March 1945	19 March 1945	1 September 1947	Sold for scrapping, 20 June 1980	Originally ordered as LST-1132
ARL-32	Bellona	27 December 1944	26 March 1945	28 July 1945	5 June 1946	Grounded, 1 December 1945, Declared unsalvageable & destroyed with explosives, 14 May 1946	Originally ordered as LST-1136
ARL-33	Chimaera		30 March 1945	7 August 1945	8 March 1948	Unknown, Final Disposition, sold, 20 March 1962 to NASSCO, Terminal Island, San Pedro, CA	Originally ordered as LST-1137
ARL-35	Daedalus	31 January 1945	27 April 1945	19 October 1945	23 October 1947	Laid up in the Atlantic Reserve Fleet, Green Cove Springs Group, Sold, 28 October 1960	Originally ordered as LST-1143
ARL-36	Gordius	5 February 1945	7 May 1945	18 May 1945	11 June 1945	Transferred to Iran, 7 September 1968, fate: unknown	Originally ordered as LST-1145, Recommissioned: 14 September 1945 through 21 December 1955
ARL-37	Indra	12 February 1945	21 May 1945	2 October 1945	6 October 1947	Transferred to North Carolina, January 1992, Sunk as an artificial reef, 4 August 1992	Originally ordered as LST-1147, Recommissioned: 16 December 1967 through 1 May 1970
ARL-38	Krishna	23 February 1945	25 May 1945	3 December 1945	15 September 1971	Sold to the Republic of the Philippines, 30 October 1971	Originally ordered as LST-1149
ARL-39	Quirinus	3 March 1945	4 June 1945	15 June 1945	27 March 1947	Transferred to Venezuela, June 1962, Scuttled. Used as a target ship	Originally ordered as LST-1151
ARL-40	Remus	28 July 1942	10 October 1942	21 January 1943	15 July 1946	sold for scrapping, 16 December 1947	Originally ordered as LST-453
ARL-41	Achilles	3 August 1942	17 October 1942	30 January 1943	19 July 1946	transferred to the Republic of China, 8 September 1947, run aground and abandoned, 1949, captured 1949, by People's Liberation Army Navy, fate: unknown	Originally ordered as LST-455
ARL-42	Aeolus						Originally ordered as LST-310, Ordered converted to ARL. Conversion cancelled 12 September 1945
ARL-43	Cerberus						Originally ordered as LST-316, Ordered converted to ARL. Conversion cancelled 12 September 1945
ARL-44	Conus						Originally ordered as LST-317, Ordered converted to ARL. Conversion cancelled 12 September 1945
ARL-45	Feronia						Originally ordered as LST-332, Ordered converted to ARL. Conversion cancelled 12 September 1945
ARL-46	Chandra						Originally ordered as LST-350, Ordered converted to ARL. Conversion cancelled 12 September 1945
ARL-47	Minerva						Originally ordered as LST-374, Ordered converted to ARL. Conversion cancelled 11 September 1945
