= USS Numitor =

Achelous-class repair ship and landing ship

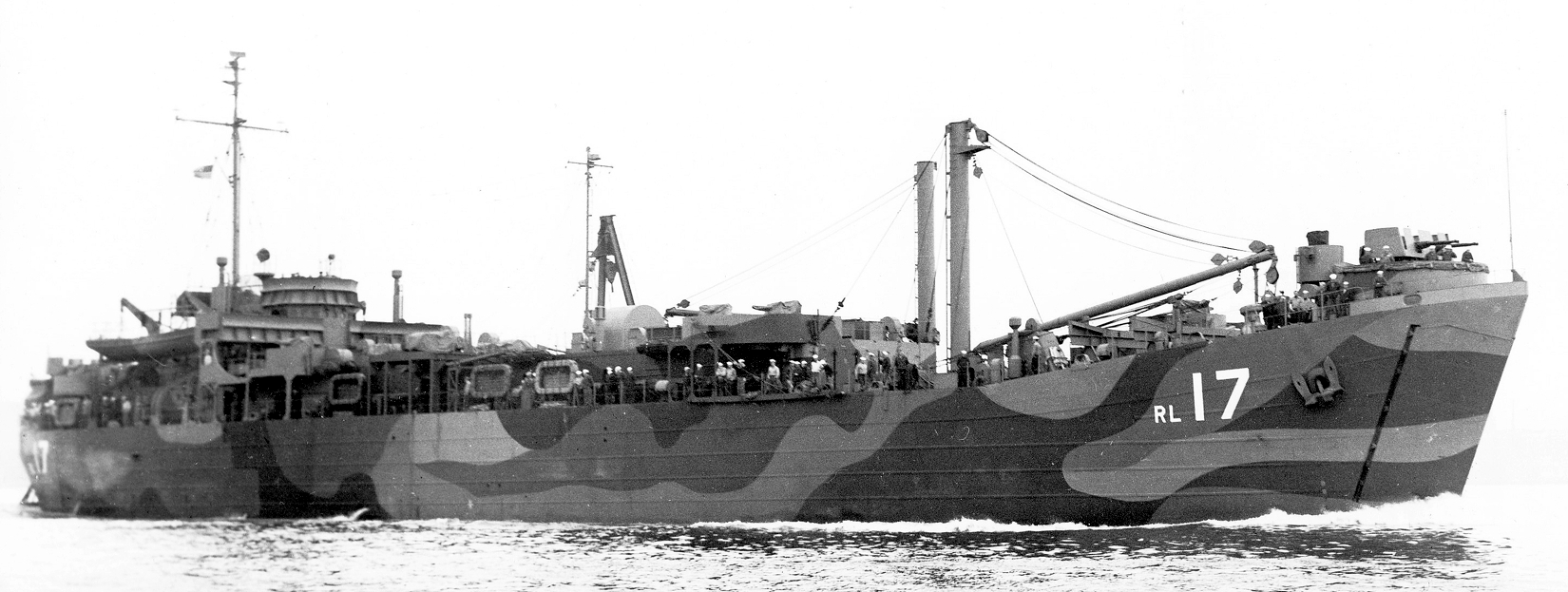
- USS Numitor (ARL-17) underway, date and location unknown.

History

United States
- Name: LST-954; Numitor
- Namesake: Numitor
- Builder: Bethlehem-Hingham Shipyard, Hingham, Massachusetts
- Yard number: 3424
- Laid down: 19 September 1944
- Launched: 18 October 1944
- Commissioned: 3 April 1945
- Decommissioned: 1 July 1947
- Renamed: 14 August 1944
- Stricken: 1 April 1960
- Identification: Hull symbol: LST-954; Hull symbol: ARL-17; Code letters: NKFF
- Fate: Sold, and converted to a drydock

General characteristics
- Class & type: LST-542-class tank landing ship; Achelous-class repair ship
- Displacement: 3,900 long tons (4,000 t) light; 4,100 long tons (4,200 t) full load
- Length: 328 ft (100 m) oa
- Beam: 50 ft (15 m)
- Draft: 11 ft 2 in (3.40 m)
- Installed power: 2 × 900 hp (670 kW) Electro-Motive Diesel 12-567A diesel engines; 1,800 shp (1,300 kW)
- Propulsion: 1 × Falk main reduction gears; 2 × Propellers
- Speed: 11.6 kn (21.5 km/h; 13.3 mph)
- Complement: 22 officers, 233 enlisted men
- Armament: 1 × 3 in (76 mm)/50 caliber dual purpose gun; 2 × quad 40 mm (1.57 in) Bofors guns (with Mark 51 director); 6 × twin 20 mm (0.79 in) Oerlikon cannons

USS Numitor (ARL-17) was to be laid down as an LST-542-class tank landing ship but was instead laid down as one of 39 Achelous-class repair ships landing craft repair ships built for the United States Navy during World War II. Named for Numitor (in Roman mythology, King Numitor of Alba Longa, son of Procas, and the father of Rhea Silvia), she was the only US Naval vessel to bear the name.

== Construction ==
LST-954 was redesignated ARL-17 and named Numitor on 14 August 1944. Numitor was laid down on 19 September 1944, at Hingham, Massachusetts, by the Bethlehem-Hingham Shipyard; launched on 18 October 1944. After conversion by Bethlehem Key Highway Shipyard, Baltimore, Maryland, she was commissioned on 3 April 1945.

== Service history ==
After shakedown in Chesapeake Bay, the landing-craft repair ship departed Norfolk, Virginia 12 May 1945; transited the Panama Canal; received additional gear on the West Coast, sailed via Pearl Harbor, the Marshall Islands, and Caroline Islands, and reached Okinawa, 10 August 1945. With the end of World War II her base of operations transferred to Sasebo, Japan, where the ship continued in occupation service from 22 September until 22 February 1946.

Returning to the United States, Numitor again transited the Panama Canal and arrived in Orange, Texas, on 17 June 1946. Initially assisting in the deactivation of other vessels, she was placed out of commission in reserve on 1 July 1947. Struck from the Naval Vessel Register on 1 April 1960, Numitor was sold to the Southern Scrap Material Co., of New Orleans, Louisiana. The hull was later sold to the Dravo Corporation for conversion to a drydock.

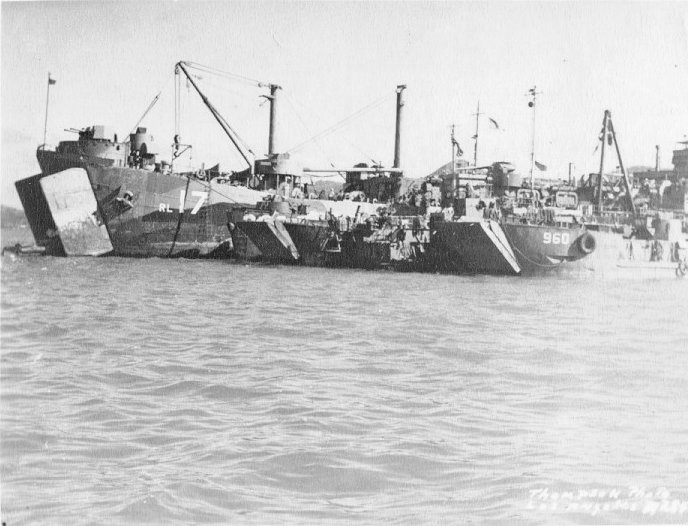
Numitor with miscellaneous naval ships and craft alongside including LCT-960, date and place unknown.

== Bibliography ==
Online resources

- "LST-954". Dictionary of American Naval Fighting Ships. Naval History and Heritage Command. This article incorporates text from this source, which is in the public domain.
- "Numitor". Dictionary of American Naval Fighting Ships. Naval History and Heritage Command. 14 August 2015. This article incorporates text from this source, which is in the public domain.
- "Bethlehem-Hingham, Hingham MA". ShipbuildingHistory.com. 11 August 2011.
- "USS Numitor (ARL-17)". NavSource. 13 December 2013.
