= USS Menelaus =

1944 LST-542-class tank landing ship

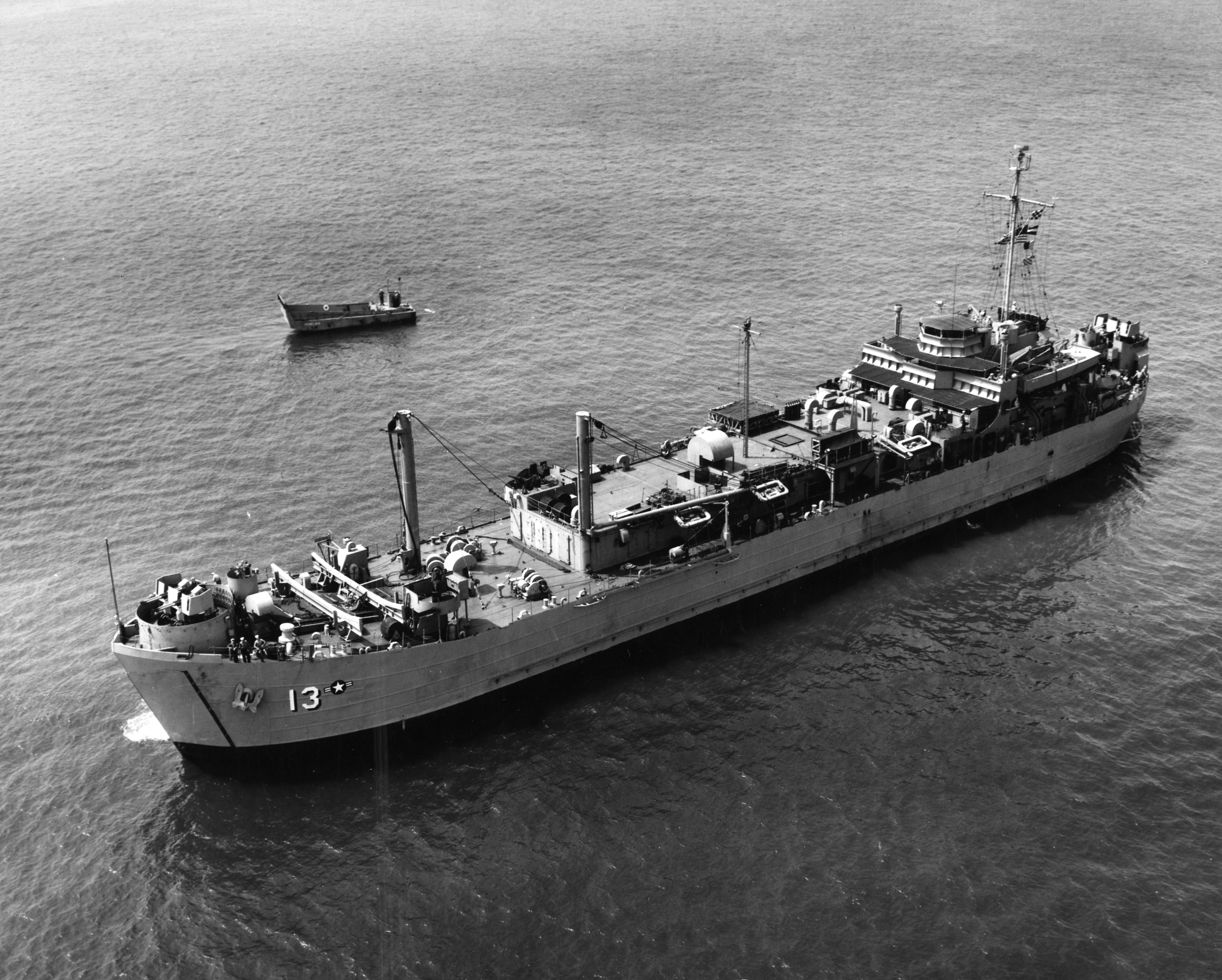
- Menelaus on 31 July 1951

History

United States
- Name: LST-971; Menelaus
- Namesake: Menelaus
- Builder: Bethlehem-Hingham Shipyard, Hingham, Massachusetts
- Yard number: 3441
- Laid down: 17 November 1944
- Launched: 20 December 1944
- Commissioned: 15 January 1945, reduced commission; 29 May 1945, full commission
- Decommissioned: 29 January 1945; 5 June 1947
- Fate: Laid up in the Atlantic Reserve Fleet, Orange Group
- Recommissioned: 14 December 1950
- Decommissioned: 5 September 1955
- Stricken: 1 June 1960
- Identification: Hull symbol: LST-971; Hull symbol: ARL-13; Code letters: NJKY
- Fate: Sold for commercial service, 28 October 1960

United States
- Name: Maryland Clipper
- Owner: Norfolk, Baltimore and Caroline Line
- Acquired: 28 October 1960
- Identification: IMO number: 5227859
- Fate: Sold, 1978

Venezuela
- Owner: Thor Corporation
- Acquired: 1978
- Identification: IMO number: 5227859
- Status: Fate unknown

General characteristics
- Class & type: LST-542-class tank landing ship; Achelous-class repair ship
- Displacement: 3,900 long tons (4,000 t) light; 4,100 long tons (4,200 t) full load
- Length: 328 ft (100 m) oa
- Beam: 50 ft (15 m)
- Draft: 11 ft 2 in (3.40 m)
- Installed power: 2 × 900 hp (670 kW) Electro-Motive Diesel 12-567A diesel engines; 1,800 shp (1,300 kW)
- Propulsion: 1 × Falk main reduction gears; 2 × Propellers
- Speed: 11.6 kn (21.5 km/h; 13.3 mph)
- Complement: 22 officers, 233 enlisted men
- Armament: 1 × 3 in (76 mm)/50 caliber dual purpose gun; 2 × quad 40 mm (1.57 in) Bofors guns (with Mark 51 directors); 6 × twin 20 mm (0.79 in) Oerlikon cannons

USS Menelaus (ARL-13) was laid down as a United States Navy LST-542-class tank landing ship but converted to one of 39 Achelous-class repair ships that were used for repairing landing craft during World War II. Named for Menelaus (in Greek mythology, a son of Atreus, king of Ancient Sparta, husband of Helen and younger brother to Agamemnon), she was the only US Naval vessel to bear the name.

== Construction ==
LST-971 was laid down on 17 November 1944, at Hingham, Massachusetts, by the Bethlehem-Hingham Shipyard; launched 20 December 1944; sponsored by Mrs. William Cosgrove; and placed in reduced commission 15 January 1945. Proceeding to Baltimore, Maryland, she decommissioned on 29 January; was converted to an ARL at the Bethlehem Key Highway Shipyard; and commissioned in full as Menelaus (ARL 13) 29 May 1945.

== Service history ==
=== World War II ===
Having completed shakedown and fitting out by 2 July, the landing craft repair ship headed north to Davisville, Rhode Island, to take on pontoons for transport to forward areas. On 7 July, she departed the east coast, transited the Panama Canal on 15 July, and was two days out of Pearl Harbor when she received word of the Japanese surrender. Mooring in Pearl Harbor 16 August, she got underway again on 20 August, for Saipan, where she carried out her repair duties for the next six months.

Departing Saipan 18 February 1946, Menelaus proceeded, via Hawaii, the Panama Canal, and New Orleans, to Galveston, Texas, arriving 17 June, to begin inactivation. Completing the process at Orange, Texas, she decommissioned 5 June 1947, and was berthed there as a unit of the Atlantic Reserve Fleet.

=== Korean War ===
Recommissioned 14 December 1950, she sailed for Charleston, South Carolina, for outfitting and on 24 March 1951, arrived at Norfolk, Virginia, to report for duty to ComAirLant. On 5 September, having added aviation supply duties to her role as a repair ship, she departed Norfolk for an extended tour with the United States 6th Fleet in the Mediterranean. For the next four and a half years, with only one interruption for availability at Norfolk, 9 March to 15 August 1953, Menelaus operated throughout the Mediterranean. On 19 March 1955, she returned to Norfolk for her second pre-inactivation overhaul. In June, she steamed to Green Cove Springs, Florida, where she decommissioned 5 September. The ARL remained berthed in Florida, as a unit of the Atlantic Reserve Fleet until struck from the Naval Vessel Register 1 June 1960. On 28 October 1960 she was sold to the Norfolk, Baltimore & Caroline Line, which subsequently placed her in service as MV Maryland Clipper.

She was sold in 1978, to the Thor Corporation of Venezuela, her final fate is unknown.

== Bibliography ==
- "Menelaus (ARL-13)". Dictionary of American Naval Fighting Ships. Navy Department, Naval History and Heritage Command. 2021.
- "Bethlehem-Hingham, Hingham MA". ShipbuildingHistory.com. 11 August 2011.
- "USS Menelaus (ARL-13)". NavSource. 6 December 2013.
