= USS ARL-6 =

1943 Achelous-class repair ship

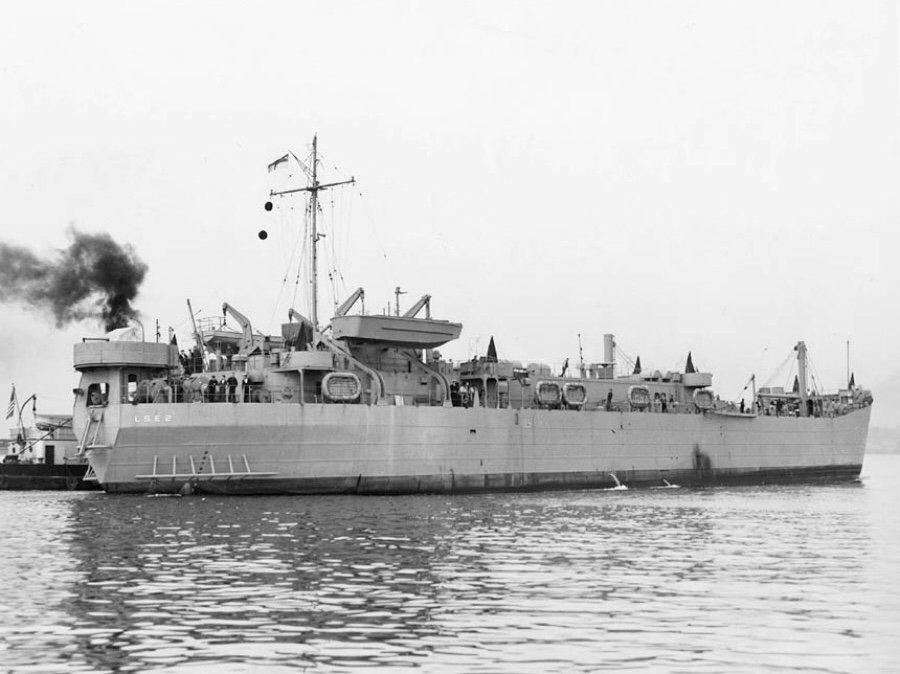
- HMS LSE-2 in Baltimore on 25 September 1943

History

United States
- Name: ARL-6
- Builder: Jeffersonville Boat & Machine Company, Jeffersonville, Indiana
- Laid down: 25 March 1943, as LST-82
- Launched: 9 June 1943
- Commissioned: 26 July 1943
- Decommissioned: 2 August 1943
- Reclassified: ARL-6, 20 July 1943
- Stricken: 29 October 1946
- Fate: Transferred to the Royal Navy, 2 August 1943; Sold to Argentina, 20 August 1947

United Kingdom
- Name: LSE-2
- Acquired: 2 August 1943
- Fate: Returned to the US Navy, 21 May 1946

Argentina
- Name: Ingeniero Gadda
- Acquired: 20 August 1947
- Decommissioned: 25 August 1960
- Identification: IMO number: 6621533
- Fate: Sold into merchant service, 1968

General characteristics
- Class & type: Achelous-class repair ship
- Displacement: 2,220 long tons (2,256 t) light; 4,200 long tons (4,267 t) full
- Length: 328 ft (100 m)
- Beam: 50 ft (15 m)
- Draft: 11 ft 2 in (3.40 m)
- Propulsion: 2 × General Motors 12-567 diesel engines, two shafts, twin rudders
- Speed: 12 knots (14 mph; 22 km/h)
- Complement: 255 officers and enlisted men
- Armament: 2 × quad 40 mm w/Mk-51 directors; 2 × twin 40 mm w/Mk-51 directors; 6 × twin 20 mm

USS ARL-6 was one of 39 Achelous-class landing craft repair ships built for the United States Navy during World War II.

Originally laid down as LST-82 on 25 March 1943 at Jeffersonville, Indiana by the Jeffersonville Boat & Machine Company; launched on 9 June 1943; sponsored by Mrs. G. D. Kellogg; redesignated ARL-6 on 20 July 1943; and commissioned on 26 July 1943.

On 2 August 1943, she was decommissioned and transferred to the United Kingdom as HM LSE-2. The tank landing ship never saw active service with the United States Navy. She was returned by the United Kingdom on 21 May 1946 and she was struck from the Naval Vessel Register on 29 October 1946.

On 20 August 1947 she was sold to Argentina as ARA Ingeniero Gadda (Q-22) and served that government until she was decommissioned on 25 August 1960. She was sold by the Argentine Navy in 1968 to Bottachi S. A. (Argentina), for trade between Argentina and Brazil, after which time she was renamed MV Tierra Del Fuego.
