= USS ARL-5 =

1943 Achelous-class repair ship

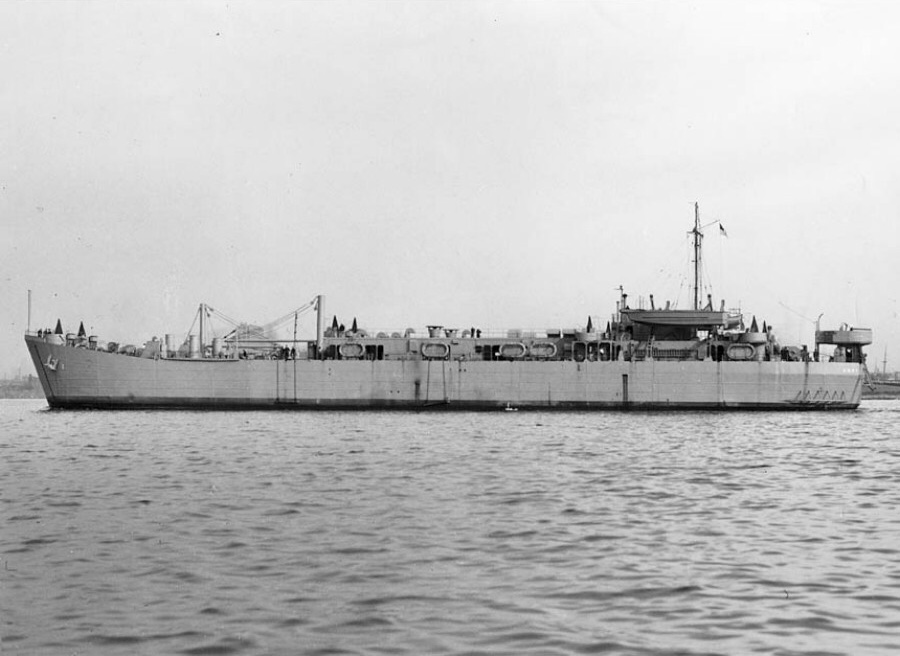
- HMS LSE-1 in Baltimore on 25 September 1943

History

United States
- Name: ARL-5
- Builder: Jeffersonville Boat & Machine Company, Jeffersonville, Indiana
- Laid down: 8 March 1943, as LST-81
- Launched: 28 May 1943
- Commissioned: 21 July 1943
- Decommissioned: 19 July 1943
- Reclassified: ARL-5, 20 July 1943
- Stricken: 29 October 1946
- Fate: Transferred to the Royal Navy, 29 July 1943; Sold to Argentina, 20 August 1947

History

United Kingdom
- Name: LSE-1
- Acquired: 29 July 1943
- Fate: Returned to the US Navy, 21 May 1946

History

Argentina
- Name: Ingeniero Hodesh; Ingeniero Iribas
- Acquired: 20 August 1947
- Fate: Sold 1967

General characteristics
- Class & type: Achelous-class landing craft repair ship
- Displacement: 2,220 long tons (2,256 t) light; 4,200 long tons (4,267 t) full
- Length: 328 ft (100 m)
- Beam: 50 ft (15 m)
- Draft: 11 ft 2 in (3.40 m)
- Propulsion: 2 × General Motors 12-567 diesel engines, two shafts, twin rudders
- Speed: 12 knots (14 mph; 22 km/h)
- Complement: 255 officers and enlisted men
- Armament: 2 × quad 40 mm w/Mk-51 directors; 2 × twin 40 mm w/Mk-51 directors; 6 × twin 20 mm

USS ARL-5 was one of 39 Achelous-class landing craft repair ships built for the United States Navy during World War II.

Originally laid down as LST-81 on 8 March 1943, at Jeffersonville, Indiana by the Jeffersonville Boat & Machine Company; launched on 28 May 1943; sponsored by Miss Bettie Meador; and commissioned on 21 July 1943. She was decommissioned on 19 July 1943, and redesignated ARL-5 on 20 July 1943.

On 29 July 1943, she was transferred to the United Kingdom and served the Royal Navy as HM LSE-1 until 21 May 1946, when she was returned to the United States. She was struck from the Naval Vessel Register on 29 October 1946.

On 20 August 1947, LST-81 was sold to Argentina and served that government as ARA Ingeniero Hodesh (Q-21), then renamed ARA Ingeniero Iribas (Q-21). She was sold by the Argentine Navy in 1967.
