= USS Coronis =

WWII US naval vessel

USS Coronis (ARL-10)
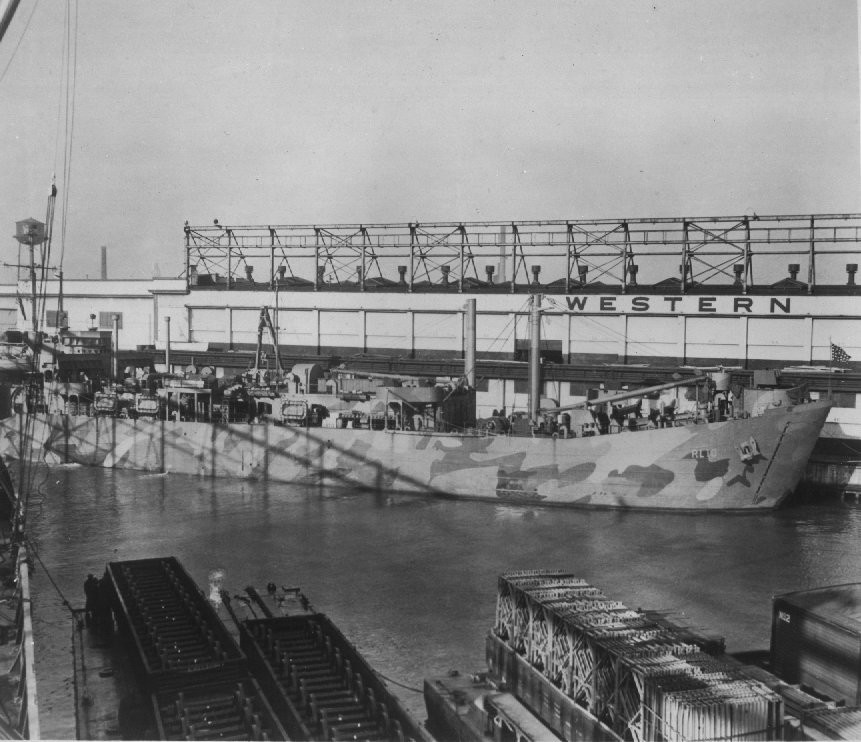
- USS Coronis pierside at Western Pipe and Steel Company, San Francisco, California

History

United States
- Name: USS LST-1003
- Builder: Boston Navy Yard
- Launched: 8 June 1944
- Commissioned: 29 June 1944 (partial)

United States
- Name: USS Coronis (ARL-10)
- Namesake: Coronis
- Commissioned: 28 November 1944
- Decommissioned: 29 July 1946
- Reclassified: 12 June 1944
- Identification: IMO number: 6701345
- Fate: Scrapped, 2022

General characteristics
- Class & type: Achelous-class repair ship
- Displacement: 1,781 long tons (1,810 t) light; 3,960 long tons (4,024 t) full
- Length: 328 ft (100 m)
- Beam: 50 ft (15 m)
- Draft: 11 ft 2 in (3.40 m)
- Propulsion: 2 × General Motors 12-567 diesel engines, two shafts, twin rudders
- Speed: 12 knots (14 mph; 22 km/h)
- Complement: 255 officers and enlisted men
- Armament: 2 × quad 40 mm guns; 2 × twin 40 mm guns; 6 × twin 20 mm guns

Service record
- Operations: World War II
- Awards: 1 battle star

USS Coronis (ARL-10) was one of 39 Achelous-class repair ship landing craft built for the United States Navy during World War II. Named for Coronis (one of several characters in Greek mythology, including the mother of Asclepius, god of medicine and healing), she was the only US Naval vessel to bear the name.

Originally laid down as USS LST-1003, an LST-542-class tank landing ship, she was launched 8 June 1944 by the Boston Navy Yard and sponsored by Mrs. V. M. Rines. Renamed and reclassified USS Coronis (ARL-10) on 12 June 1944 she was placed in partial commission 29 June 1944 and sailed to Baltimore, Maryland for conversion to a landing craft repair ship. Coronis was commissioned in full 28 November 1944.

== Service history ==
Departing Norfolk, Virginia 4 January 1945 Coronis arrived at Purvis Bay, in the Solomon Islands to repair battle-damaged landing craft in preparation for the invasion of Okinawa. Arriving at Ulithi, the staging area, on 24 March she joined the Service and Salvage Unit, and five days later sortied with them for Okinawa, arriving off the island 3 April. There she repaired landing craft and the smaller radar picket ships, and operated a fog generator to give protective cover from air attack to ships lying in her area. On 18 June Coronis sailed for Saipan and Guam to load spare parts and supplies, and continued to Subic Bay, in the Philippines, where she acted as repair ship for the training group preparing for the invasion of Japan.

Coronis received one battle star for service during World War II.

== Post war history ==
After the end of the War, Coronis returned to Okinawa 26 August to repair landing ships of the 5th Fleet. She also converted USS LST-494 into a minecraft tender. She arrived in Wakayama Bay on 25 September to operate a boat pool, and service ships of the 5th Fleet carrying out occupation activities until 16 March 1946. After calling at Shanghai, China she sailed for Astoria, Oregon, arriving 2 May. Coronis was placed out of commission in reserve at Vancouver, Washington on 29 July 1946, and was struck from the Naval Vessel Register at an unknown date.

Coronis was sold for commercial service in 1965 for Canadian Pacific Railways's British Columbia Coast Steamships. In 1966 the Coronis was converted into a RORO ferry with four sets of tracks and renamed MV Trailer Princess. She carried rail cars and semi-trailers between Vancouver Island and downtown Vancouver, British Columbia until her retirement in 1986.

In 1986 she was sold to Helifor Industries Ltd. of Vancouver, British Columbia. In 2003 Trailer Princess was converted into an unpowered barge outfitted with a helicopter landing pad and refueling stations and used as a logging camp support platform.

On 14 February 2022 a helicopter pilot reported the Trailer Princess to be listing. She later sank in Duncan Bay north of Campbell River, British Columbia. That year, the Canadian Coast Guard, working with the Campbell River First Nation (Wei Wai Kum), placed containment booms and absorbent materials around the vessel to prevent the release of fuels into the surrounding waters. The Canadian Coast Guard hired AMIX/Marine Recycling Corporation to remove the remaining fuels on board and re-float the barge in preparation for removal and scrapping. The cleanup and removal effort cost $4.7-million Canadian dollars.
