= USS Sphinx =

US Navy tank landing ship

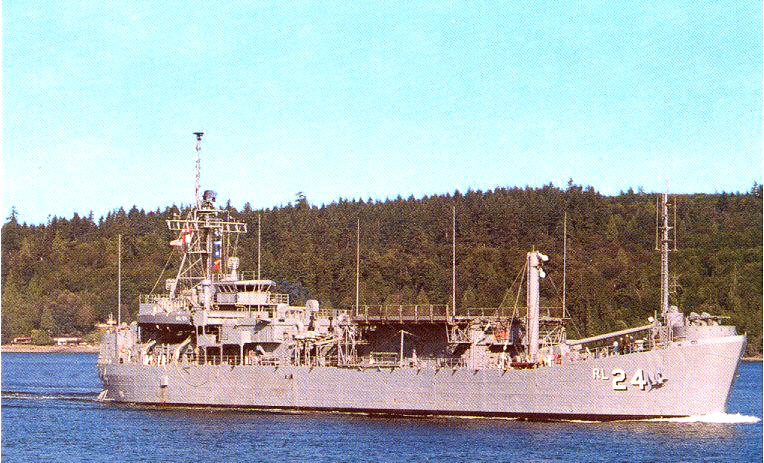
- USS Sphinx (ARL-24) underway in Puget Sound prior to recommissioning in 1985 at Bremerton Navy Yard

History

United States
- Name: LST-963; Sphinx
- Namesake: Sphinx
- Builder: Bethlehem Shipbuilding Corporation
- Laid down: 20 October 1944
- Launched: 7 March 1945
- Commissioned: 12 December 1944, partial commission; 10 May 1945, full commission
- Decommissioned: 26 May 1947
- Recommissioned: 3 November 1950
- Decommissioned: 31 January 1956
- Recommissioned: 16 December 1967
- Decommissioned: 30 September 1971
- Stricken: 16 April 1977
- Acquired: 1985
- Recommissioned: 26 July 1985
- Decommissioned: 16 June 1989
- Stricken: 2 December 2002
- Identification: Hull symbol: LST-963; Hull symbol: ARL-24; Code letters: NDMQ
- Honors and awards: 1 × battle star (Korean War); 8 × campaign stars (Vietnam War)
- Fate: Towed for scrapping, 1 December 2007

General characteristics
- Class & type: LST-542-class tank landing ship; Achelous-class repair ship
- Displacement: 3,900 long tons (4,000 t) light; 4,100 long tons (4,200 t) full load
- Length: 328 ft (100 m) oa
- Beam: 50 ft (15 m)
- Draft: 11 ft 2 in (3.40 m)
- Installed power: 2 × 900 hp (670 kW) Electro-Motive Diesel 12-567A diesel engines; 1,800 shp (1,300 kW)
- Propulsion: 1 × Falk main reduction gears; 2 × Propellers
- Speed: 11.6 kn (21.5 km/h; 13.3 mph)
- Complement: 21 officers, 232 enlisted men
- Armament: 1 × 3 in (76 mm)/50 caliber dual purpose gun; 2 × quad 40 mm (1.57 in) Bofors guns (with Mark 51 directors); 2 × twin 40 mm Bofors guns (with Mark 51 directors); 6 × twin 20 mm (0.79 in) Oerlikon cannons

Service record
- Part of: Joint Task Force 1 (World War II)
- Operations: World War II; Korean War; Vietnam War
- Awards: World War II; American Campaign Medal; Asiatic–Pacific Campaign Medal; World War II Victory Medal; Navy Occupation Service Medal w/Asia Clasp; Korean War; National Defense Service Medal; Korean Service Medal; United Nations Korea Medal; Korean War Service Medal; Vietnam War; Combat Action Ribbon; Presidential Unit Citation; Navy Unit Commendation; Vietnam Service Medal; Republic of Vietnam Gallantry Cross Unit Citation; Republic of Vietnam Civil Actions Unit Citation; Republic of Vietnam Campaign Medal

USS Sphinx (ARL-24) was laid down as a United States Navy LST-542-class tank landing ship but converted to one of 39 Achelous-class repair ships that were used for repairing landing craft during World War II. Named for the Sphinx (a mythical monster formed by joining the body of a lion and the head of a human), she was the only US Naval vessel to bear the name.

== Construction ==
Originally authorized as LST-963, the ship was redesignated as a landing craft repair ship (ARL) and named Sphinx on 11 September 1944; laid down 20 October 1944, at Hingham, Massachusetts, by the Bethlehem-Hingham Shipyard; and launched on 18 November 1944. She was placed in partial commission for ferrying to her fitting out yard, the Merrill Stevens Drydock, Jacksonville, Florida, 12 December 1944. Decommissioned 8 January 1945, for fitting out, she was recommissioned Sphinx (ARL-24), 10 May 1945.

== Service history ==
=== World War II ===
Sphinx completed fitting out and proceeded to Norfolk, Virginia for sea trials and shakedown in Chesapeake Bay. On 12 June 1945, Sphinx sailed for the west coast; transited the Panama Canal on 23 June; and proceeded via San Diego to San Francisco. She was assigned to the Amphibious Forces, US Pacific Fleet, and ordered to Hawaii. Sphinx arrived in Pearl Harbor, on 31 July, and repaired craft there until 27 August, when she sailed for Adak, Alaska.

Before she reached Adak, her sailing orders were modified, routing her to Japan. She arrived at Mutsu Bay, Honshū, on 14 September, and began repairing and refitting minesweepers. Sphinx moved to Yokosuka, on 20 November, and sailed for Saipan, on 3 December 1945. She operated in the central Pacific islands until entering Pearl Harbor, on 9 January 1947, en route to the west coast for decontamination. The ship had participated in "Operation Crossroads," the atomic bomb tests at Bikini Atoll, in the Marshall Islands, from early April to 29 August 1946.

Sphinx arrived at San Pedro, Los Angeles, on 22 January, where she was decontaminated and prepared for inactivation. She was placed out of commission, in reserve, on 26 May 1947.

=== Korean War ===
The outbreak of hostilities in Korea created a need for Sphinx's repair facilities in the Far East. She was recommissioned on 3 November 1950. After outfitting and holding shakedown training, she stood out of San Diego, on 17 August 1951, and proceeded via Pearl Harbor to Japan. Sphinx arrived at Yokosuka, on 29 September, and operated from Japanese ports until 7 May 1952. During this time, she repaired and serviced fleet units that were being used in Korea. The ship returned to San Diego, on 4 June 1952, and operated along the California coast until redeployed to the Far East from 3 March to 9 December 1954. Sphinx operated along the west coast during 1955, and on 31 January 1956, was again placed out of commission, in reserve, and berthed at San Diego.

=== Vietnam War ===
In January 1967 orders were issued to reactivate Sphinx for use in Vietnam. She was towed to New Orleans, Louisiana, in February, and on 16 December 1967, placed in commission. The ship sailed for the west coast on 8 January 1968, and arrived at San Diego, on 23 February. On 22 April, Sphinx and Cohoes sailed for the western Pacific. The ships made port calls at Pearl Harbor, Kusaie, Guam, and Subic Bay. Sphinx sailed independently from there on 6 June, and four days later, arrived at Vũng Tàu, South Vietnam. Sphinx moved to Dong Tam Base Camp, on 11 June, and was assigned to the Mobile Riverine Force in the Mekong Delta. Her unit was Task Force (TF) 117 composed of 11 shallow-draft ships and over 150 river assault boats. The repair ship was on a non-rotating basis and, during 1969, had very little time underway. She operated in the Tien Giang and Ham Luong rivers, providing service and support for the river boats as they engaged in operations against the Viet Cong. The ship sailed from Vietnam, on 21 June, for a yard period at Sasebo, and returned on 25 August.

Upon her return to Vietnam, Sphinx operated along the Vam Co River. In addition to her regular duties, the ship served as the tactical operations center of the Can Giuoc Interdiction Unit and also developed helicopter capabilities, handling 50 landings before 31 December 1969. She remained in Vietnam, until 14 December 1970, when she weighed anchor for a yard period at Yokosuka. On the last day of the year, the ship lost power in both main engines and was adrift 340 mi (550 km) from Sasebo. On 2 January 1971, USS Chipola took her under tow for Sasebo where she was repaired.

Sphinx was back off Vietnam, on 11 March, and remained there until sailing for the west coast several months later. She arrived at Bremerton, Washington, on 2 July, and prepared to rejoin the reserve fleet. On 30 September 1971, Sphinx was placed in reserve, out of commission, and remained berthed at Bremerton, into December 1974. Sphinx was struck from the Naval Vessel Register on 16 April 1977.

=== Intelligence-gatherer ===
Sphinx was reacquired by the Navy in 1985, and recommissioned 26 July 1985, at Puget Sound Naval Shipyard, Bremerton. From September 1984 to July 1985, the ship went through a $25 million overhaul at the Puget Sound Naval Shipyard to become an intelligence-collection platform. It conducted patrols off the Pacific coast of El Salvador, monitoring the actions of the communist guerrilla forces. The ship was decommissioned for the last time on 16 June 1989, at Norfolk, and laid up in the National Defense Reserve Fleet, James River Group, Lee Hall, Virginia, 15 June 1990.

== Museum ship ==
Custody of Sphinx was transferred on 2 December 2002, to the Dunkirk Historical Lighthouse and Veterans Park Museum in Dunkirk, New York, for preservation, where she was regarded as the "Sole Survivor of All LSTs in The US Mothball Fleet Today."

Sphinx at Bay Bridge awaiting scrapping

It was reported in May 2007, that Sphinx was being stripped of parts by groups from other historical ships, as the Dunkirk Historical group was unsuccessful in raising adequate funds to tow her to their location. In April 2007, the Maritime Administration (MARAD) retained the title and officially withdrew her from donation. On 24 August, Sphinx was sold for scrapping to North American Recycling, Inc., Sparrows Points, Maryland, as part of a five ship contract worth $2,161,610. The ship was moved to Baltimore, but the scrapper went out of business and Sphinx was abandoned along with another Atlantic Reserve Fleet ship, the former Hoist. On 30 November 2007, Sphinx was acquired by Bay Bridge Enterprises, Chesapeake, Virginia, for $695,000, who moved her to their facility for disposal. The vessel arrived at their facility on 1 December 2007.

== Awards ==
- Combat Action Ribbon
- Presidential Unit Citation with star (2 awards)
- Navy Unit Commendation with two stars (3 awards)
- Asiatic-Pacific Campaign Medal
- World War II Victory Medal
- Navy Occupation Medal with "ASIA" clasp
- National Defense Service Medal with one star
- Korean War Service Medal with one battle star
- Armed Forces Expeditionary Medal
- Vietnam Service Medal with eight campaign stars
- Korean Presidential Unit Citation
- Republic of Vietnam Cross of Gallantry with palm
- Republic of Vietnam Civil Actions Unit Citation
- United Nations Korea Medal
- Korean War Service Medal (Korea)
- Republic of Vietnam Campaign Medal

=== Presidential Unit Citation ===
The Mobile Riverine Task Force 117 received a Presidential Unit Citation from Richard Nixon "[f]or extraordinary heroism and outstanding performance of duty from 25 January through 5 July 1969 while engaged in armed conflict against enemy forces in the Mekong Delta region of the Republic of Vietnam."

== Bibliography ==
Online resources

- "Sphinx". Dictionary of American Naval Fighting Ships. Naval History and Heritage Command. 15 September 2015. This article incorporates text from this source, which is in the public domain.
- "Bethlehem-Hingham, Hingham MA". ShipbuildingHistory.com. 11 August 2011.
- "USS Sphinx (ARL- 24)". NavSource. 7 January 2017.
- Harper, Scott (27 December 2007). "Scrap destination changes for 4 ships from 'ghost fleet'". The Virginian-Pilot. Archived from the original on 29 December 2007.
