= USS Daedalus =

Warship

History

United States
- Name: LST-1143; Daedalus
- Namesake: Daedalus
- Ordered: as a Type S3-M-K2 hull
- Builder: Chicago Bridge & Iron Company, Seneca, Illinois
- Laid down: 31 January 1945
- Launched: 27 April 1945
- Commissioned: 9 May 1945 (reduced); 19 October 1945 (full)
- Decommissioned: 21 May 1945; 23 October 1947
- Reclassified: ARL-41
- Refit: converted to Landing Craft Repair Ship
- Identification: Hull symbol: LST-1143; Hull symbol: ARL-35
- Fate: Laid up in the Atlantic Reserve Fleet, Green Cove Springs Group; Sold, 28 October 1960

United States
- Name: Virginia Clipper
- Owner: Norfolk, Baltimore and Caroline Line
- Acquired: 28 October 1960
- Identification: IMO number: 5381992
- Fate: Sold, 1978

General characteristics
- Class & type: LST-542-class tank landing ship; Achelous-class repair ship
- Displacement: 3,900 long tons (4,000 t) light; 4,100 long tons (4,200 t) full load
- Length: 328 ft (100 m) oa
- Beam: 50 ft (15 m)
- Draft: 11 ft 2 in (3.40 m)
- Installed power: 2 × 900 hp (670 kW) Electro-Motive Diesel 12-567A diesel engines; 1,800 shp (1,300 kW)
- Propulsion: 1 × Falk main reduction gears; 2 × Propellers
- Speed: 11.6 kn (21.5 km/h; 13.3 mph)
- Complement: 19 officers, 270 enlisted men
- Armament: 1 × 3 in (76 mm)/50 caliber dual purpose gun; 2 × quad 40 mm (1.57 in) Bofors guns (with Mark 51 directors); 6 × twin 20 mm (0.79 in) Oerlikon cannons

USS Daedalus (ARL-35) was one of 39 Achelous-class landing craft repair ships built for the United States Navy during World War II. Named for Daedalus (in Greek mythology, an exiled Athenian who served in the courts of Minos and Kokalos, regarded as representative of artists and artisans of the later Minoan or Mykenaian age; imprisoned by Minos, he made wings to escape), she was the only U.S. Naval vessel to bear the name.

== Construction ==
Laid down as LST-1143 at Chicago Bridge and Iron Company, Seneca, Illinois; redesignated landing craft repair ship ARL-35 14 August 1944; launched 27 April 1945; sponsored by Mrs. D. Steinmann; placed in partial commission 9 May 1945; sailed to Mobile, Alabama, where she was decommissioned 21 May, for conversion to a landing craft repair ship; and commissioned in full 19 October 1945.

== Service history ==
Daedalus departed Mobile 3 December 1945, and arrived at Norfolk, Virginia, six days later. She provided repair services to the fleet at Norfolk, Guantanamo Bay, and Newport, Rhode Island, until arriving at Charleston, South Carolina, 1 July 1947, for overhaul. Later towed to Green Cove Springs, Florida, she was placed out of commission in reserve there 23 October 1947. Struck from the Naval Vessel Register (date unknown), she was sold 28 October 1960, to the Norfolk, Baltimore and Caroline Line for commercial service and renamed Virginia Clipper. The ship was resold in 1978, to Thor Corporation of Venezuela; her final fate is unknown.

== Bibliography ==
Online resources

- "Daedalus". Dictionary of American Naval Fighting Ships. Naval History and Heritage Command. 6 July 2015. This article incorporates text from this source, which is in the public domain.
- "Chicago Bridge & Iron, Seneca IL". www.ShipbuildingHistory.com. 20 December 2014.
- "USS Daedalus (ARL-35)". NavSource. 20 October 2017.
