= USS Pandemus =

American naval ship

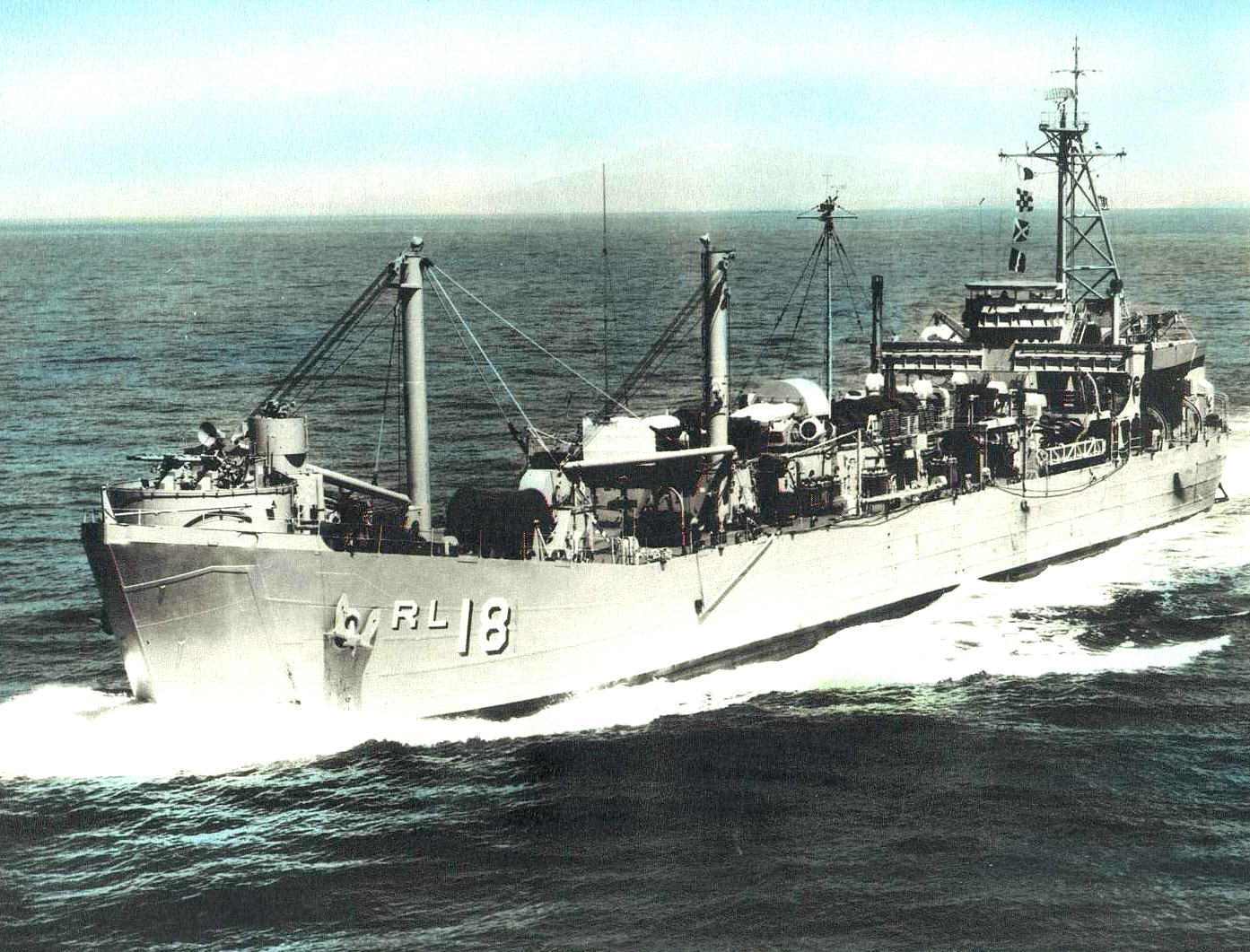
- USS Pandemus

History

United States
- Name: USS Pandemus
- Namesake: Pandemus, a goddess in Egyptian mythology and Greek mythology
- Builder: Chicago Bridge and Iron Company, Seneca, Illinois
- Laid down: 20 July 1944
- Launched: 10 October 1944
- Sponsored by: Mrs. Laura Sauter Gasperik
- Commissioned: 23 February 1945
- Decommissioned: 23 September 1946
- Recommissioned: 14 December 1951
- Decommissioned: 30 September 1968
- Stricken: 1 October 1968
- Fate: Sunk as a target, 1969

General characteristics
- Class & type: Achelous class repair ship
- Displacement: 2,220 long tons (2,256 t) light; 4,100 long tons (4,166 t) full
- Length: 328 ft (100 m)
- Beam: 50 ft (15 m)
- Draft: 11 ft 2 in (3.40 m)
- Propulsion: 2 × General Motors 12-567 diesel engines, two shafts, twin rudders
- Speed: 12 knots (14 mph; 22 km/h)
- Complement: 255 officers and enlisted men
- Armament: 2 × quad 40 mm guns (with Mark 51 director); 2 × twin 40 mm guns (with Mark 51 director); 6 × twin 20 mm guns

Service record
- Awards: 1 battle star for World War II

USS Pandemus (ARL-18) was one of 39 Achelous-class landing craft repair ships built for the United States Navy during World War II and was in commission from 1945 to 1946 and from 1951 to 1968. Named for Pandemus (a civic goddess in Egyptian and Greek mythology, perhaps of marriage, personifying earthly or common love), she has been the only U.S. Navy vessel to bear the name.

== Construction and commissioning ==
Pandemous originally was laid down as the LST-542-class tank landing ship USS LST-650 on 20 July 1944 by the Chicago Bridge and Iron Company at Seneca, Illinois. While under construction, she was reclassified as a landing craft repair ship and re-designated as ARL–18 on 14 August 1944 and named Pandemus on 11 September 1944. She was launched on 10 October 1944, sponsored by Mrs. Laura Sauter Gasperik, and placed in reduced commission on 21 October 1944 for transit to New Orleans, Louisiana, then decommissioned on 3 November 1944 for conversion to a landing craft repair ship by Todd Johnson Dry Dock, Inc. After the conversion was complete, she was commissioned in full on 23 February 1945.

== Service history ==
=== 1st commission, 1945–1946 ===
Pandemus departed New Orleans on 12 March 1945 for shakedown out of Panama City, Florida, and returned for alterations on 26 March 1945. On 4 April 1945, she stood down the Mississippi River, bound by way of the Panama Canal, Hawaii, the Marshall Islands, the Mariana Islands, and Ulithi Atoll to Hagushi anchorage, Okinawa. There she tended and repaired infantry in 1945.

Pandemus touched at Guam and Saipan on her way to San Pedro Bay, Leyte, Philippine Islands. She serviced landing and small craft in that area and then at Okinawa and Shanghai, China. She was put to sea from Shanghai on 21 December 1945 and steamed by way of Pearl Harbor, Hawaii, to San Pedro, Los Angeles, arriving there on 5 February 1946. She departed San Pedro on 11 February 1946 on her way to Mobile, Alabama, where she arrived on 3 March 1946. She shifted to Algiers, Louisiana, on 4 July 1946 and decommissioned there on 23 September 1946.

=== 2nd commission, 1951–1968 ===
Pandemus recommissioned at Green Cove Springs, Florida, on 14 December 1951. After fitting out at Merrill Stevens Shipyard at Jacksonville, Florida, she visited Norfolk, Virginia, on 23 January 1952 and arrived at her new home port, the U.S. Naval Minecraft Base at Charleston, South Carolina, on 30 March 1952 and began 16½ years of service supporting minesweeping operations along the United States East Coast from Newport, Rhode Island, to Key West, Florida, and in the Caribbean and Gulf of Mexico.

== Final decommissioning and disposal ==
Pandemous decommissioned on 30 September 1968 and was struck from the Naval Vessel Register on 1 October 1968. She was sunk as a target in late 1969.

== Honors and awards ==
Pandemus received one battle star for World War II service.
