= USS Typhon =

US Navy landing craft repair ship

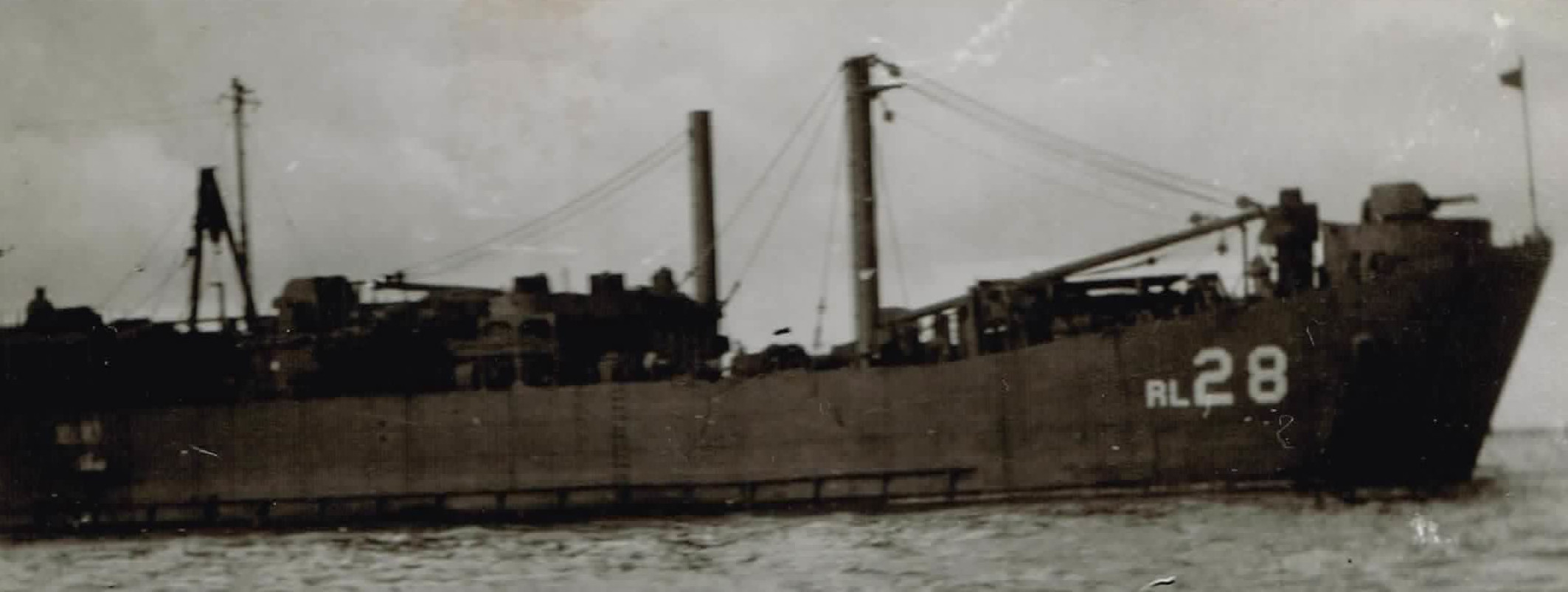
- The USS Typhon (ARL-28)

History

United States
- Name: USS Typhon
- Builder: Chicago Bridge and Iron Company
- Laid down: 17 October 1944
- Launched: 5 January 1945
- Commissioned: 18 January 1945
- Decommissioned: 1947
- Stricken: 1 July 1960
- Fate: Sold to private interest, 23 February 1961

General characteristics
- Class & type: Achelous class repair ship
- Displacement: 2,220 long tons (2,256 t) light; 4,100 long tons (4,166 t) full
- Length: 328 ft (100 m)
- Beam: 50 ft (15 m)
- Draft: 11 ft 2 in (3.40 m)
- Propulsion: 2 × General Motors 12-567 diesel engines, two shafts, twin rudders
- Speed: 12 knots (14 mph; 22 km/h)
- Complement: 253 officers and enlisted men
- Armament: 2 × quad 40 mm guns (Mark 51 director); 2 × twin 40 mm guns (Mark 51 director); 6 × twin 20 mm guns

USS Typhon (ARL-28) was one of 39 Achelous-class landing craft repair ships built for the United States Navy during World War II. The ship was named for Typhon, the son of Tartarus and Gaea in Greek mythology.

On 14 August 1944 (before her construction began), LST-1118 was reclassified a landing craft repair ship (ARL-28). The ship was named Typhon on 11 September 1944 and her keel was laid down on 17 October 1944 at Seneca, Illinois by the Chicago Bridge and Iron Company; sponsored by Mrs. F. E. Kitteredge, the ship was launched on 5 January 1945 and commissioned on 18 January 1945.

== Service history ==
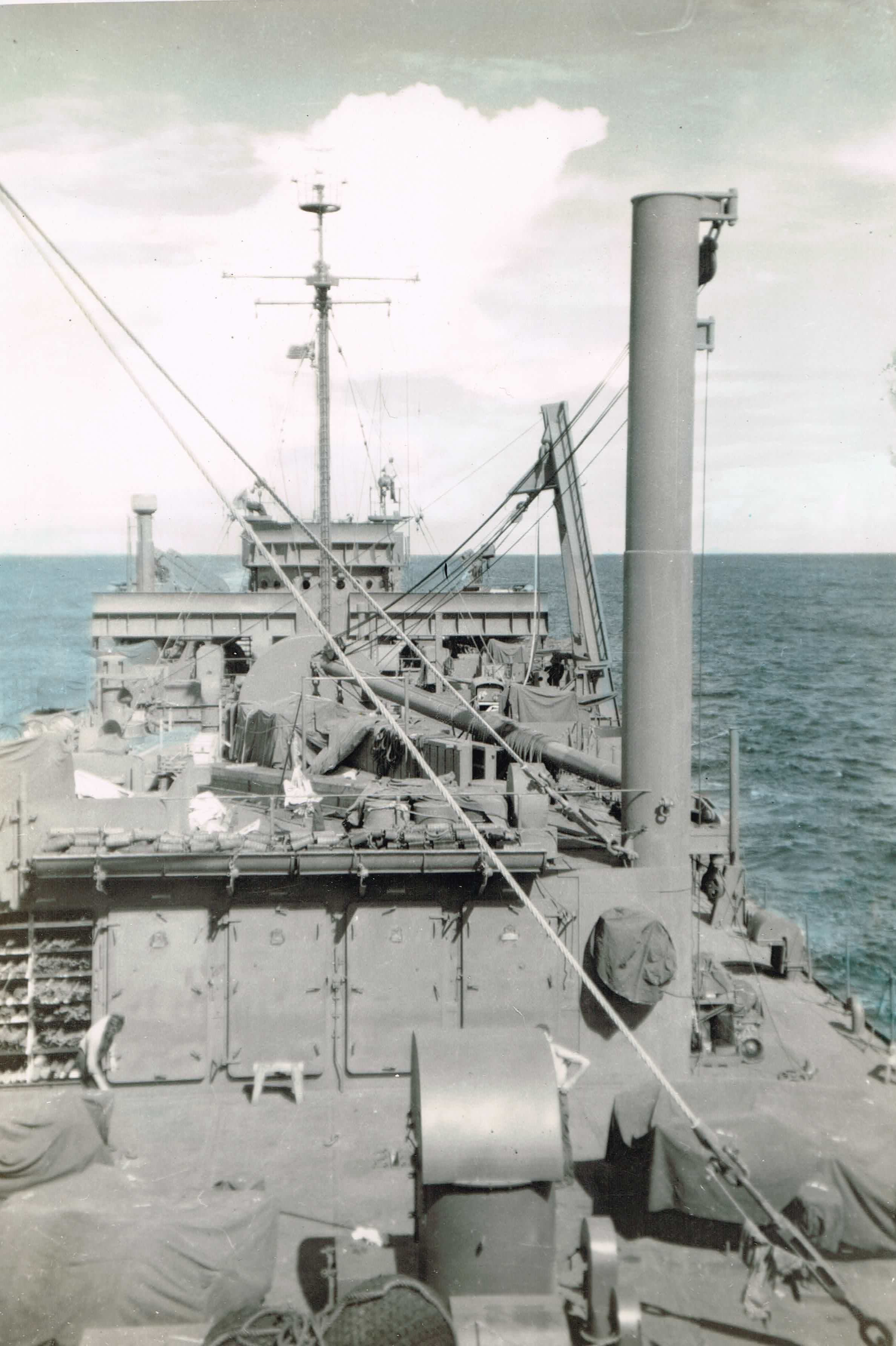
View from the conning tower of the USS Typhon

Typhon proceeded down the Illinois Waterway and the Mississippi River and reached New Orleans on 20 January. She then moved to Mobile, Alabama to repair her propeller blades which she had damaged soon after leaving Seneca. When again ready for sea, Typhon proceeded via Panama City, Florida to Baltimore, Maryland where she arrived on 13 February. Three days later, she was decommissioned there for completion as a landing craft repair ship. While the conversion was in progress, the ship's officers and men underwent special training at Camp Bradford, Virginia with additional instruction in amphibious warfare at Little Creek, Virginia. On 18 June 1945 Typhon was recommissioned. Ten days later, she got underway for Hampton Roads to conduct her shakedown training in the Norfolk area. After post-shakedown inspections, the ship departed Norfolk on 22 July; picked up a load of pontoons at Davisville, Rhode Island; and headed, via the Panama Canal, for the west coast. En route, the repair ship received word that Japan had surrendered, ending the war in the Pacific. Putting into San Diego on 18 August, she unloaded her pontoons and, 10 days later, got underway for the Hawaiian Islands, arriving at Pearl Harbor on 7 September.

After two months there, she headed westward and proceeded, via the Marianas, to Japan. Anchoring off Yokosuka on 16 November, she remained in Japanese waters until early 1946 when she made a brief run back to the Marianas. Returning to Japan with supplies, the repair ship reached Nagasaki on 13 February and remained there until late March, when Typhon headed for China, arriving at Shanghai on 30 March. For almost a year, the ship operated out of Hong Kong and Shanghai, working to support American occupation forces in China. Late in February 1947, she prepared to return home and arrived at San Diego on 29 March. Decommissioned, Typhon was laid up in reserve in 1947 at San Diego. On 1 July 1960 her name was struck from the Naval Vessel Register, and the ship was sold on 23 February 1961 to Al Epstein of New Orleans.
