= USS Endymion =

Achelous-class landing craft repair ship

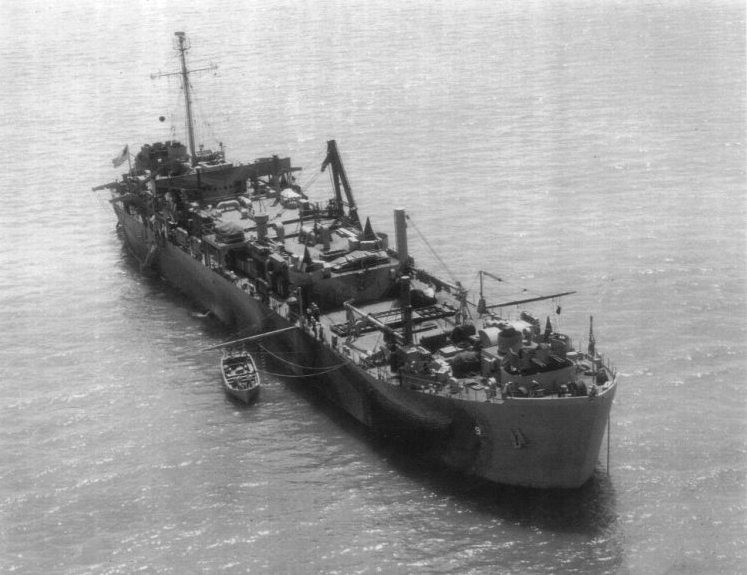
- USS Endymion

History

United States
- Name: USS Endymion
- Namesake: Endymion
- Launched: 17 December 1943
- Commissioned: 9 May 1944
- Decommissioned: 30 November 1946
- Stricken: 1 June 1972
- Identification: IMO number: 8332461
- Fate: Sold for commercial service, 1 September 1973

General characteristics
- Class & type: Achelous class repair ship
- Displacement: 1,781 long tons (1,810 t) light; 3,960 long tons (4,024 t) full
- Length: 328 ft (100 m)
- Beam: 50 ft (15 m)
- Draft: 11 ft 2 in (3.40 m)
- Propulsion: 2 × General Motors 12-567 diesel engines, two shafts, twin rudders
- Speed: 12 knots (14 mph; 22 km/h)
- Complement: 255 officers and enlisted men
- Armament: 2 × quad 40 mm guns; 2 × twin 40 mm guns; 6 × twin 20 mm guns

USS Endymion (ARL-9) was one of 39 Achelous-class landing craft repair ships built for the United States Navy during World War II. Named for Endymion (in Greek mythology, a handsome Aeolian shepherd or hunter), she was the only U.S. Naval vessel to bear the name.

Originally laid down as LST-513; reclassified ARL-9 on 3 November 1943; launched on 17 December; sponsored by Mrs. Mary C. Hanley; and commissioned on 9 May 1944.

== Service history ==
After a brief shakedown cruise in the Chesapeake Bay she sailed for Guantanamo Bay, joined a convoy headed toward the Panama Canal, and proceeded independently to San Diego. Continuing to Pearl Harbor she deployed with TG 32.6 to Guadalcanal where she arrived on 26 August 1944. She effected repairs here and at the Russell Islands before joining a task group preparing for the invasion of the Palau Islands where she carried on her vital work. From 3 October to 25 February 1945 she was active at Kossol Passage. On the latter date she sailed in convoy to Leyte where she remained for a month in the performance of diving operations and repairing of landing craft. She next proceeded with Task Unit 51.14.3 for the invasion of Okinawa and rendered invaluable service to battle- and weather-damaged destroyers, landing craft and patrol vessels. On 28 April 1945 she suffered damage from a shrapnel burst which wounded 15 of her crew.

On 10 May 1945 she changed her anchorage to Buckner Bay where she underwent frequent suicide plane attacks, but continued uninterrupted her repair service. Endymion got underway with Task Unit 31.29.29 for Saipan on 7 June 1945. She then left Saipan for Pearl Harbor without benefit of protective escort—which was unusual, given the great potential for risk to the ship and its crew.

On 21 June she was torpedoed. At least two torpedoes passed beneath the ship, but a third detonated directly under the fantail, causing damage to her steering gear and resulting in 11 [reported] wounded. The submarine then surfaced, but before its crew could man and operate its deck guns, one of the Endymion's gunners (Gunner's Mate First Class Alfred "Al" Lamay) directed continuous fire at the submarine's conning tower with one of the ship's twin 20mm anti-aircraft cannons (likely the Oerlikon 20mm/85 KAA). This heroic action is credited as having saved the lives of the Endymion's crew, because common practice was for Japanese naval commanders to sink damaged ships and leave no survivors. Cannon fire from the twin 20mm guns is thought to have severely damaged and possibly penetrated the conning tower, forcing the Japanese submarine to submerge and run. However, Endymion sat immobile for two to three days, during which time crew reported seeing a US Navy sea plane (Martin PBM-5 Mariner) approach, circle, turn around, and fly off. A submarine chaser was dispatched to bring her in to Eniwetok Harbor where temporary repairs were made. She continued to Pearl Harbor where she readied herself for return to take part in the invasion of Japan, but the war ended and Endymion headed back to the United States. Endymion began a period of overhaul at Astoria, Oregon on 9 November 1945. She was decommissioned on 30 November 1946 and was placed in the Pacific Reserve Fleet.

Struck from the Naval Vessel Register 1 June 1972, she was sold for commercial service 1 September 1973. Registered to Petrola Hellas S.A. of Panama in 1974 and renamed Petrola XVIII, she was restyled as Petrola 18 in September, 1976. Sold in 1978 to the Thetis Shipping & Trading Corporation S.A. of Panama, then resold (date unknown) to Sete Technical Services S.A. of Panama and renamed Sete 50, her final fate is unknown.
