= Repair ship =

Ship used to provide maintenance support to warships and other vessels

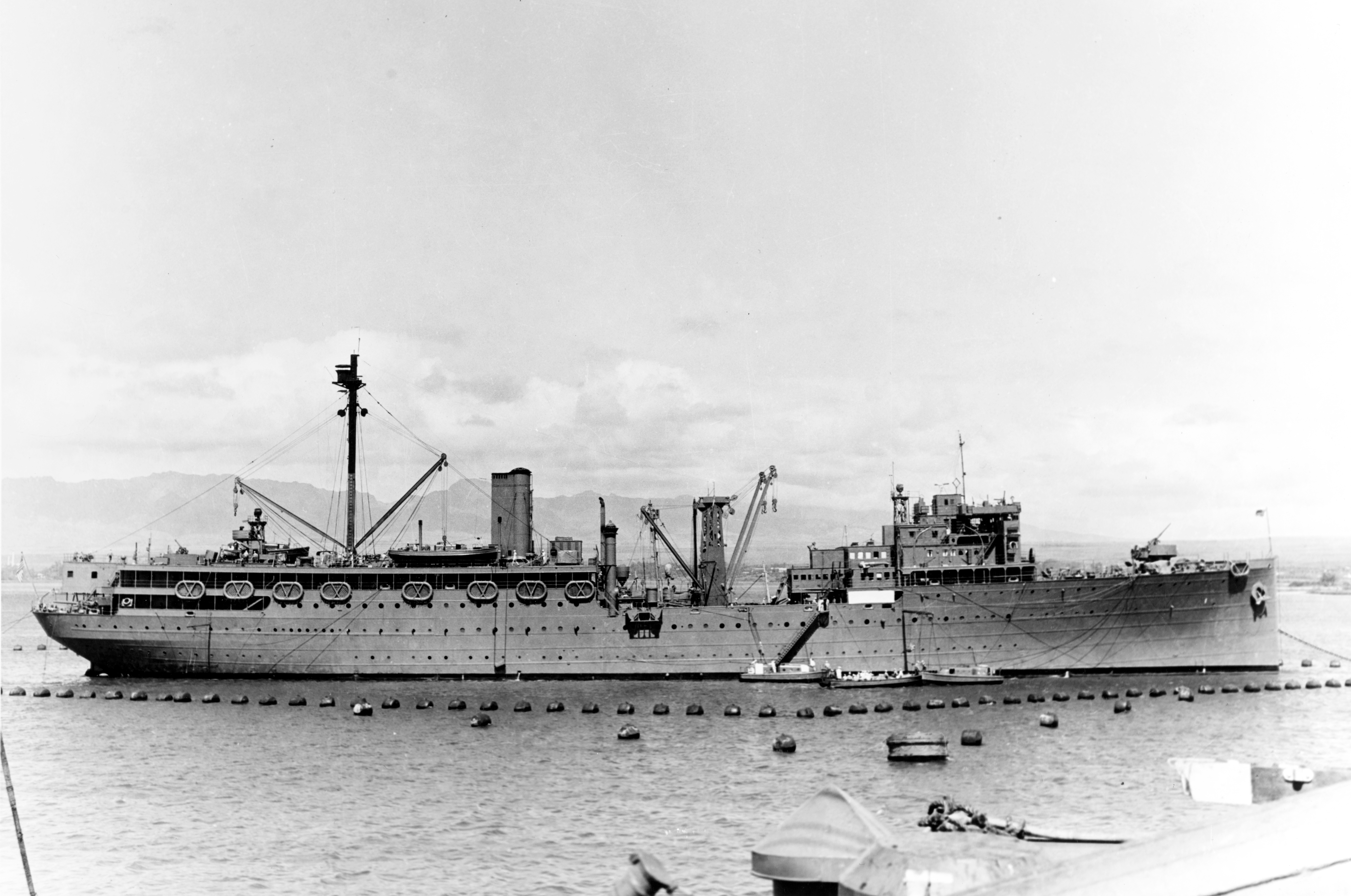
USS Medusa was the first United States Navy ship built as a repair ship.

A repair ship is a naval auxiliary ship designed to provide maintenance support to warships. Repair ships provide similar services to destroyer, submarine and seaplane tenders or depot ships, but may offer a broader range of repair capability including equipment and personnel for repair of more significant machinery failures or battle damage.

== United States Navy ==
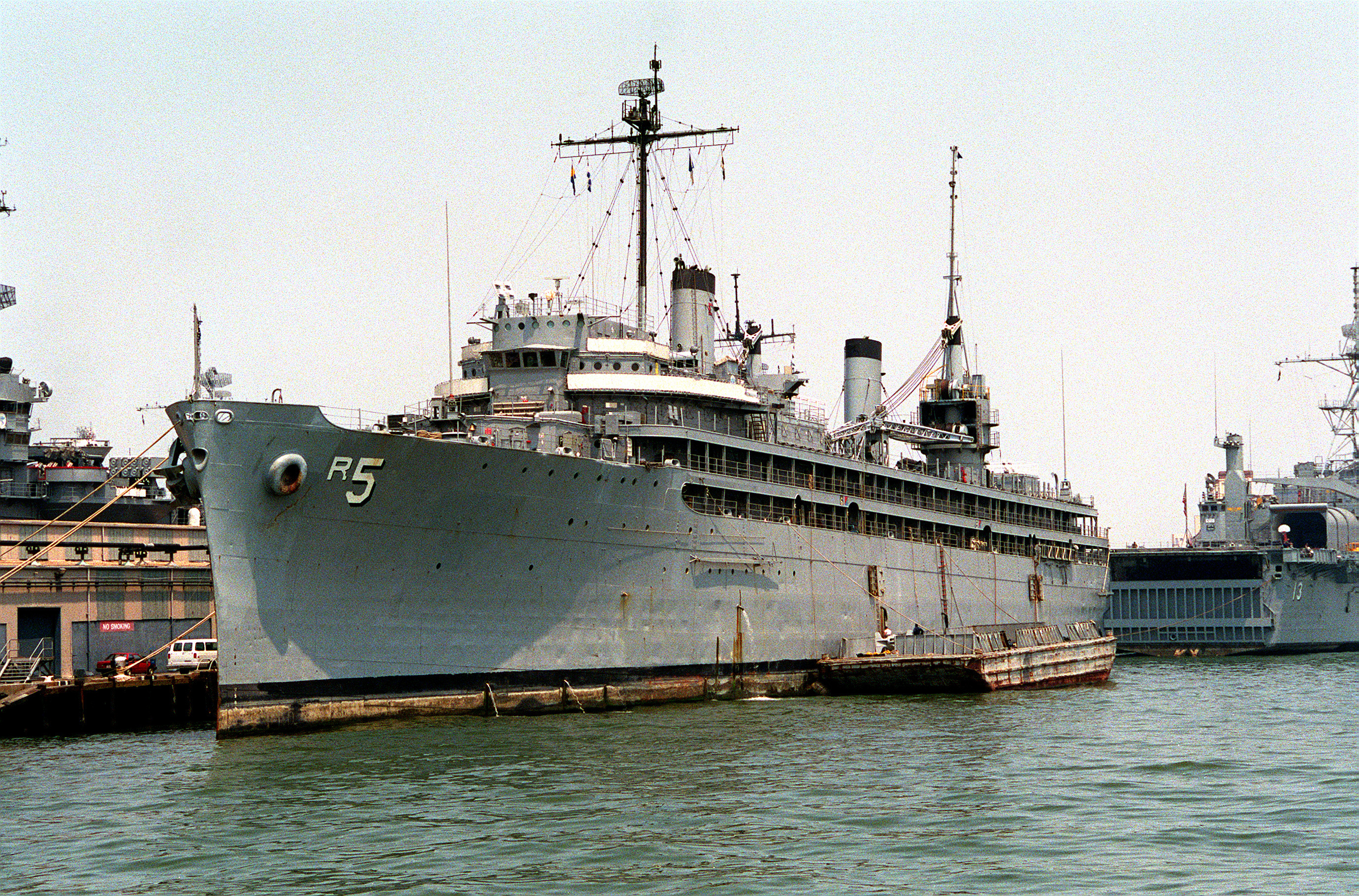
With a capable crew of qualified repairmen, USS Vulcan was kept in good repair for a long service life.

The United States Navy became aware of the need for repair ships to maintain Asiatic Fleet ships stationed in the Philippines. Two colliers were converted to USS Prometheus and Vestal in 1913 before the purpose-built USS Medusa was completed at the Puget Sound Navy Yard in 1923.

=== Repair Ships (AR) ===
- USS Medusa (AR-1)
- USS Bridgeport (AR-2)
- USS Prometheus (AR-3)
- USS Vestal (AR-4)
- USS Vulcan (AR-5)
- USS Ajax (AR-6)
- USS Hector (AR-7)
- USS Jason (AR-8)
- USS Delta (AR-9)
- USS Alcor (AR-10)
- USS Rigel (AR-11)
- USS Briareus (AR-12)
- USS Amphion (AR-13)
- USS Cadmus (AR-14)
- USS Xanthus (AR-19)
- USS Laertes (AR-20)
- USS Dionysus (AR-21)
- USS Klondike (AR-22)
- USS Markab (AR-23)
- USS Grand Canyon (AR-28)

=== Internal Combustion Engine Repair Ships (ARG) ===
Internal combustion engine repair ships specialized in the maintenance and repair of gasoline engines and diesel engines. Commonly work was performed on PT boats, submarines, and many types of landing craft and boats at US Naval Advance Bases. Most were named after islands of the Philippines.

Luzon-class

- USS Oglala (ARG-1)
- USS Luzon (ARG-2)
- USS Mindanao (ARG-3)
- USS Tutuila (ARG-4)
- USS Oahu (ARG-5)
- USS Cebu (ARG-6)
- USS Culebra Island (ARG-7)
- USS Leyte (ARG-8), renamed USS Maui
- USS Mona Island (ARG-9)
- USS Palawan (ARG-10)
- USS Samar (ARG-11)
- USS Dumaran (ARG-14)
- USS Masbate (ARG-15), later ARV-2 aircraft repair ship
- USS Kermit Roosevelt (ARG-16)
- USS Hooper Island (ARG-17)
- USS Beaver (ARG-19), ex-AS-5
- USS Otus (ARG-20), ex-AS-20

Basilan class

- USS Basilan (ARG-12), ex-AG-68
- USS Burias (ARG-13), ex-AG-69

=== Heavy-hull Repair Ships (ARH) ===
- USS Jason (ARH-1), later AR-8

=== Landing Craft Repair Ships (ARL) ===
Landing Craft Repair Ships were used to repair the thousands of Landing craft built for World War II.

Achelous-class repair ship

- USS Achelous (ARL-1), ex-LST-10
- USS Amycus (ARL-2), ex-LST-489
- USS Agenor (ARL-3), ex-LST-490
- USS Adonis (ARL-4), ex-LST-83
- USS ARL-5, ex-LST-81
- USS ARL-6, ex-LST-82
- USS Atlas (ARL-7), ex-LST-231
- USS Egeria (ARL-8), ex-LST-136
- USS Endymion (ARL-9), ex-LST-513
- USS Coronis (ARL-10), ex-LST-1003
- USS Creon (ARL-11), ex-LST-1036
- USS Poseidon (ARL-12), ex-LST-1037
- USS Menelaus (ARL-13), ex-LST-971
- USS Minos (ARL-14), ex-LST-644
- USS Minotaur (ARL-15), ex-LST-645
- USS Myrmidon (ARL-16), ex-LST-948
- USS Numitor (ARL-17), ex-LST-954
- USS Pandemus (ARL-18), ex-LST-650
- USS Patroclus (ARL-19), ex-LST-955
- USS Pentheus (ARL-20), ex-LST-1115
- USS Proserpine (ARL-21), ex-LST-1116
- USS Romulus (ARL-22), ex-LST-961
- USS Satyr (ARL-23), ex-LST-852
- USS Sphinx (ARL-24), ex-LST-962
- USS ARL-25, canceled
- USS Stentor (ARL-26), ex-LST-858
- USS Tantalus (ARL-27), ex-LST-1117
- USS Typhon (ARL-28), ex-LST-1118
- USS Amphitrite (ARL-29), ex-LST-1124
- USS Askari (ARL-30), ex-LST-1131
- USS Bellerophon (ARL-31), ex-LST-1132
- USS Bellona (ARL-32), ex-LST-1136
- USS Chimaera (ARL-33), ex-LST-1137
- USS Daedalus (ARL-35), ex-LST-1143
- USS Gordius (ARL-36), ex-LST-1145
- USS Indra (ARL-37), ex-LST-1147
- USS Krishna (ARL-38), ex-LST-1149
- USS Quirinus (ARL-39), ex-LST-1151
- USS Remus (ARL-40), ex-LST-453
- USS Achilles (ARL-41), ex-LST-455
- USS Aeolus (ARL-42), conversion from LST-310 cancelled
- USS Cerberus (ARL-43), conversion from LST-316, cancelled
- USS Conus (ARL-44), conversion from LST-317 cancelled
- USS Feronia (ARL-45), conversion from LST-332 cancelled
- USS Chandra (ARL-46), conversion from LST-350 cancelled
- USS Minerva (ARL-47), conversion from LST-374 cancelled

== United Kingdom ==
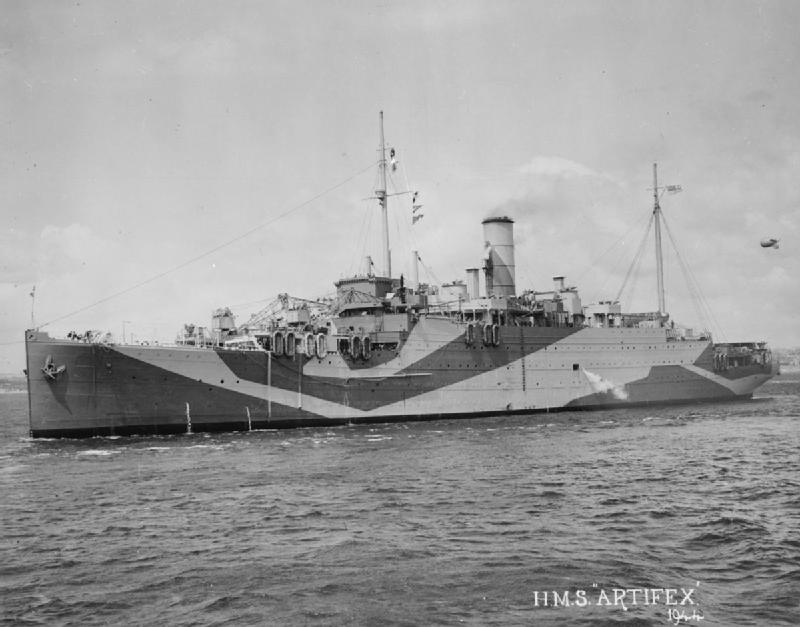
HMS Artifex

HMS Resource was built in 1928 and remained the sole Royal Navy repair ship at the outbreak of World War II. The following ships were converted to meet wartime needs:

- HMS Adventure
- HMS Alaunia (F15)
- HMAS Albatross
- HMS Artifex
- RMS Ausonia
- HMS Deer Sound
- HMS Kelantan (F166)
- SS Ranpura
- HMS San Giorgio (formerly Italian cruiser San Giorgio)
- HMS Vindictive
- HMS Wayland (F137)
- HMS Westernland (F87)

== Lend/Lease ==
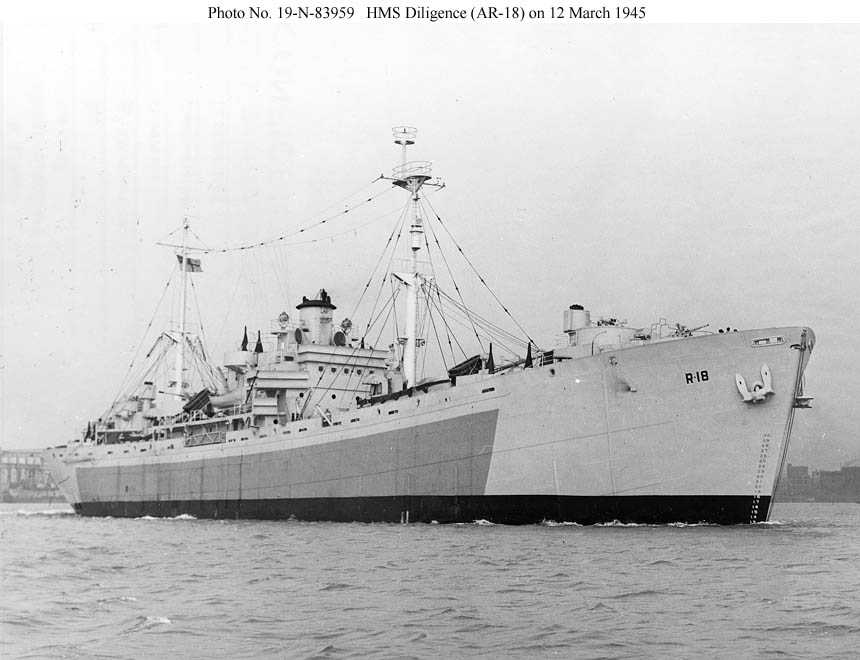
HMS Diligence

These Xanthus-class repair ships were built to Royal Navy specifications by Bethlehem Fairfield Shipyard in 1944, but only the first two were temporarily loaned to the United Kingdom while the others were retained for use by the United States Navy:

- AR-17 became HMS Assistance (F173)
- AR-18 became HMS Diligence (F174)
- USS Xanthus was intended to be HMS Hecla (F175)
- USS Laertes was intended to be HMS Dutiful (F176)
- USS Dionysus was intended to be HMS Faithful (F177)

== Japan ==
Japan found repair ships valuable for Pacific island bases. The pre-dreadnought battleship Asahi was modified and recommissioned as a repair ship in 1938. The 9,000-ton purpose-designed repair ship Akashi was launched in 1938 as the intended prototype for a class of five ships, but the remaining four ships were cancelled as other wartime shipbuilding projects assumed higher priority.

== Russian Navy ==
- Kommuna
- PM-20 (Oskol I)
- PM-68 (Oskol I)
- PM-21 (Oskol II)
- PM-51 (Modified Oskol)
- PKZ-? (former PM-148; Modified Oskol)

== See also ==
- Aircraft repair ship

== Sources ==
- Lenton, H.T.; Colledge, J.J. (1964). British and Dominion Warships of World War II. Doubleday & Company.
- Silverstone, Paul H. (1968). U.S. Warships of World War II. Doubleday & Company.
- Watts, Anthony J. (1966). Japanese Warships of World War II. Doubleday & Company.
