= USS Achilles (ARL-41) =

United States Navy LST-1-class tank landing ship

- USS LST-455 departing Mare Island Navy Yard, 7 March 1943.

History

United States
- Name: LST-455
- Builder: Kaiser Shipbuilding Company, Vancouver
- Yard number: 159
- Laid down: 3 August 1942
- Launched: 17 October 1942
- Commissioned: 30 January 1943
- Renamed: Achilles, 21 August 1944
- Namesake: Achilles
- Decommissioned: 19 July 1946
- Reclassified: ARL-41, 21 August 1944
- Refit: May 1943
- Stricken: 28 August 1946
- Identification: Code letters: NFJJ; Hull number: ARL-41
- Honors and awards: See Awards
- Fate: Transferred to the Republic of China, 8 September 1947

Taiwan
- Name: Hsing An; (興安)
- Acquired: 8 September 1947
- Commissioned: 5 November 1947
- Fate: Abandoned, 1949
- Captured: 1949 by People's Liberation Army Navy

China
- Name: Dagu Shan; (大沽山)
- Namesake: Dagu Shan
- Acquired: 1949
- Decommissioned: 1980s
- Renamed: Haixiu 891
- Identification: Hull number: U891

General characteristics
- Class & type: LST-1-class tank landing ship; Achelous-class repair ship
- Displacement: LST: 1,625 long tons (1,651 t) (light); 4,080 long tons (4,145 t) (full (seagoing draft with 1,675 short tons (1,520 t) load); 2,366 long tons (2,404 t) (beaching); ARL: 3,900 long tons (4,000 t) light; 4,100 long tons (4,200 t) full
- Length: 328 ft (100 m) oa
- Beam: 50 ft (15 m)
- Draft: LST: Unloaded: 2 ft 4 in (0.71 m) forward; 7 ft 6 in (2.29 m) aft; Full load: 8 ft 2 in (2.49 m) forward; 14 ft 1 in (4.29 m) aft; Landing with 500 short tons (450 t) load: 3 ft 11 in (1.19 m) forward; 9 ft 10 in (3.00 m) aft; ARL: 11 ft 2 in (3.40 m)
- Installed power: 2 × 900 hp (670 kW) Electro-Motive Diesel 12-567A diesel engines; 1,700 shp (1,300 kW)
- Propulsion: 1 × Falk main reduction gears; 2 × Propellers
- Speed: 11.6 kn (21.5 km/h; 13.3 mph)
- Troops: LST: 16 officers, 147 enlisted men
- Complement: LST: 13 officers 147 enlisted; ARL: 22 officers 233 enlisted
- Armament: LST: Varied, ultimate armament; 2 × twin 40 mm (1.57 in) Bofors guns; 4 × single 40mm Bofors guns; 12 × 20 mm (0.79 in) Oerlikon cannons; ARL: 1 × 3 in (76 mm)/50 caliber dual-purpose (DP) gun; 2 × quad 40 mm Bofors guns; 6 × twin 20 mm Oerlikon cannons

USS LST-455 was a United States Navy LST-1-class tank landing ship used in the Asiatic-Pacific Theater during World War II. She was converted at Sydney, Australia, into an Achelous-class repair ship, shortly after commissioning, and used in the repairing of landing craft. Named after the Greek hero Achilles, she was the only US Naval vessel to bear the name.

== Construction and career ==
LST-455 was laid down on 3 August 1942, under Maritime Commission (MARCOM) contract, MC hull 975, by Kaiser Shipyards, Vancouver, Washington; launched on 17 October 1942; and commissioned on 30 January 1943.

=== Service in the United States Navy ===
==== World War II ====
Adjudged ready for service, LST-455 sailed from San Diego on 20 February, for San Francisco and shifted thence to Hunters Point Naval Shipyard, and, later, to the Mare Island Navy Yard, Vallejo, where she completed fitting out and manning. She cleared the Golden Gate on 8 March, bound for the South Pacific and, a month and a day later, arrived in Samoan waters, en route to Australia. She ultimately reached Sydney, New South Wales, via Wellington, New Zealand, on 2 May 1943. However, while she had been en route, plans were made that would significantly change her operations in the years that lay ahead.

==== Conversion to repair ship ====
Amphibious assaults on Japanese-held islands in the South and Southwest Pacific Theater had involved virtually hundreds of landing craft of all types and sizes, ranging from small craft to infantry landing craft (LCIs) and tank landing craft (LCTs). Since these specialized assault craft, of comparatively light construction, could not be repaired with the few facilities and men available to them alone, orders went out that several tank landing ships (LSTs) would be converted to special landing craft repair ships (later classified as ARL). However, modifying existing LSTs in stateside yards required time, a critical commodity in the fairly steady pace of the amphibious island-hopping campaigns, that the forces fighting at the front did not have. At this point, LST-455, then in Australian waters, came under the gaze of these amphibious planners. In one month, lathes, welding machines, as well as cutting outfits and repair tools for the necessary types of craft, were installed on board. Departmental shops of many kinds: ranging from machine shops to motor repair work, to shipfitting, to metalsmith, to electric, and radio repair, took shape in what had once been the cavernous tank deck. Experienced personnel, trained in ship repair work, were assigned to the ship and almost doubled the size of her complement. Experienced personnel, trained in ship repair work, were assigned to the ship and almost doubled the size of her complement. Ready for service by the latter part of May 1943, the former tank landing ship departed Australian waters, bound for New Guinea, and arrived at Naval Base Milne Bay in Milne Bay on 2 June 1943. She immediately commenced the work for which she had been converted, repairing LCIs under the guidance of the repair officer of Rigel.

==== Occupation of Lae ====
On 4 September 1943, Vice Admiral Daniel E. Barbey's 7th Fleet Amphibious Forces put Australian troops ashore on the Huon Peninsula, near Lae, New Guinea. LST-455 moved up to support these operations from Morobe Bay and lay anchored there among the Allied ships, presenting a tempting target by virtue of the nest of LCIs alongside. Nine Japanese dive bombers, escorted by nine "Zero" fighters, attacked the shipping in Morobe Bay and singled out LST-455 for attention, scoring a direct hit aft. A large bomb hit the stern, passed through the galley, and exploded in the crew's quarters, aft, starting fires and trapping men in the after steering room. Determined sailors battled the blaze and cut through bulkheads to rescue the trapped men. The damage control measures were directed by the ship's commanding officer, Lieutenant William E. Peterson, Jr., USNR, who had relieved Lieutenant Cisin in August, and won him a Navy Cross for personal heroism. Although she had been heavily hit, LST-455 shot down two of the attackers. By nightfall, her men had extinguished the blaze and commenced initial repairs. She had suffered the loss of 18 men killed; 11 were wounded; and six men were missing. Sonoma then towed LST-455 to Milne Bay where the repair ship was berthed alongside Rigel. However, the need for LST-455's services was so urgent that she was soon back to work repairing LCIs even though her own severe damage had not yet been fully corrected.

==== Western New Guinea ====
In March 1944, LST-455 received orders to proceed to Buna, New Guinea, to ready landing craft for the impending invasion of western New Guinea. In May, she shifted to Alexishafen, New Guinea, and over the ensuing weeks tended her charges there, and at Sek Harbor and Bqstran Bay. For her work on two flotillas of LCI's, the ship received commendation from Vice Admiral Barbey, commanding the Seventh Fleet's Amphibious Forces.

==== Invasion of the Philippines ====
On 21 August 1944, the ship was named Achilles and reclassified officially as a landing craft repair ship, ARL-41. Soon thereafter, she proceeded north to participate in the reconquest of the Philippine Islands. As the invasion proceeded, all Service Force ships were shifted to anchorages off Samar, in San Pedro Bay. There Achilles saw daily evidence of a new weapon unveiled by the Japanese in their relentless attempt to disrupt the American offensive: the kamikaze ("Divine Wind"), planes flown by Japanese pilots on one-way missions of destruction.

During the first four days of November, the weather provided a respite from the kamikaze, although it came in the form of a typhoon which buffeted the ship. When the clouds finally cleared, the kamikaze returned. Around 13:00 on 12 November 1944, after sporadic alerts during the morning, Achilles received a warning that bogeys were in the vicinity. The ship immediately went to general quarters to watch and wait as before. Lookouts soon pinpointed three "Zeros" heading on a course that would take them across Achilles' bow. As the landing craft repair ship's forward guns commenced firing, one plane passed ahead; the second, however, turned tightly and commenced a dive straight at Achilles as she and the four LCIs moored to her lay immobile. The repair ship's gunners scored hits on the diving aircraft, but could not stop it. The aircraft crashed into the ship forward, its motor tearing through the main deck. The aircraft itself hit the forward deckhouse in the carpenter shop, where number one repair party had gathered at its battle station. After the deafening explosion that wiped out the repair party, orange-red flames (caused by gasoline from the burning aircraft) swept across the weather deck, while parts of the "Zero" tumbled through the air, some landing 250 yards (230 m) astern. Fires immediately spread, their progress unchecked due to the disruption of the forward fire mains upon impact of the aircraft. The kamikaze crash had killed 19 men and wounded an additional 28; 14 men were unaccounted for, many of these literally blown to bits in the explosion that followed the suicider's impacting the ship. Yet, as the ship's chronicler wrote later: "The bravery and coolness of the men battling the fires and helping the wounded makes one proud of the Achilles' crew . . ."

Exemplifying this bravery was Ray Dunwoody, a civilian technician, whose conduct had earned him the recommendation for a Navy Cross. Although regulations did not permit the award of such a decoration to a civilian, Dunwoody did, in fact, later receive a commendation letter in which his heroism was recognized fully.

==== Borneo operations ====
In the latter half of February 1945, and early March, Achilles returned via Biak to Leyte, but quickly proceeded to Subic Bay and Mindoro, spending a week in each place, tending LSMs and carrying out her vital support work. During the latter part of April, Achilles moved down to Morotai, in the Netherlands East Indies, for further tender duty, readying landing craft for the impending invasion of Borneo. Participating in the initial landings at Brunei Bay, Borneo, Achilles again came under air attack, when a "Dinah" loosed two bombs that landed 50 yards (46 m) off her starboard beam. This attack, on 10 June 1945, caused no damage to the ship, although shrapnel wounded two men in Achilles` crew. The repair ship remained at Borneo until she returned to the Philippines late in July to join the forces marshalling there for the projected invasion of the Japanese homeland. However, the capitulation of Japan in mid-August obviated "Operation Olympic" (the assault against the home islands of Japan) but did not end operations for Achilles. She repaired landing craft into the fall of 1945, relieved on station by Proserpine. Proceeding to Hawaii, Achilles, in company with Remus, reached Pearl Harbor on the last day of October.

==== Reposition to New Orleans ====
After five days at that Pacific base, which had provided "the first glimpse of civilization in over two years" to veteran sailors of Achilles, the repair ship departed Hawaiian waters, bound for California, and passed through the Golden Gate on 28 November 1945. Anchoring in San Francisco Bay and disembarking 165 passengers brought from Pearl Harbor, Achilles proceeded thence to Stockton, California, for repairs to her generators and heating system. She remained there until getting away for the Gulf of Mexico on 4 January 1946.

Transiting the Panama Canal on 20 January, and lingering for a day at Colón, Panama, on the Atlantic side of the isthmus, the repair ship reached New Orleans before the end of January and soon commenced work preparing LSMs and LCSs for inactivation, a task she performed into the summer. Decommissioned on 19 July 1946, Achilles was stricken from the Navy Register on 28 August 1946.

=== Service in the Republic of China Navy ===
On 14 March 1947, the Navy decided to transfer Achilles to China under lend-lease; and, on 8 September 1947, the repair ship was delivered to representatives of the Chinese Navy at New Orleans. Commissioned as ROCS Hsing An (興安), on 5 November 1947, she sailed for China two days later.

On 23 April 1949, after the Communist Chinese seized the control of the harbor of Nanking, the commander of the Second Fleet of Chinese Navy, Major General Lin Zun(林遵) surrendered the fleet to the Communists. Eighteen of twenty-three ships disobeyed the order to surrender and decided to break through. This event is known as the breakthrough in the Yangtze River (長江突圍), Or the Yangtze Fleet Uprising. The Yangtze 2nd Fleet was ordered to retreat. The local flotilla commander Lin Zu decided to switch sides and join the PLA, actually allowing commanding officers to vote their intention. Some warships complied with the Orders and attempted to escape, directed by the Admirable-class minesweeper ROCS Yong Jia. Commander Lin Zu's flagship was escort ship Hui An (ex-Japanese vessel Shisaka) but he decided to avoid opening gunfire against the departing warships but attempted to call them back. Four ships returned including the riverine gunboat Chu Tung. While some sources indicate that there had been naval gunfire, this is denied by PLAN account and it seems the warships only received fire from ground artillery of the PLA. This ship failed to escape, along with other six ships, and was run aground by the mutiny fleet and her position was shelled by artillery. The ship was then captured by the Communist forces.

=== Service in the People's Liberation Army Navy ===
The communists salvaged her, refitted her, and renamed her Dagu Shan (U891) and commissioned into the East Sea Fleet once it was established and Equipment and Technology Department.

The ship was then renamed Haixiu 891 (U891) which was a subordinate to the East China Fleet Equipment and Technology Department.

It is reported that the ship remained in use by the Communist Chinese Navy until 1980s.

== Awards ==
The ship received three battle stars for her World War II service: one as LST-455 and two as Achilles.

== Bibliography ==
- "LST-455". Dictionary of American Naval Fighting Ships. Naval History and Heritage Command. This article incorporates text from this source, which is in the public domain.
- "Achilles". Dictionary of American Naval Fighting Ships. Naval History and Heritage Command. 1 July 2016. This article incorporates text from this source, which is in the public domain.
- "Kaiser Vancouver, Vancouver WA". ShipbuildingHistory.com. 27 November 2010.
- "USS Achilles (ARL-41)". NavSource. 27 October 2017.
- Sterner, C. Douglas. "Full Text Citations For Award of The Navy Cross To U.S. Navy Personnel World War II".
- "Early National Navy Repair Ship". Archived from the original on 9 September 2018.
- "ARL/US LST-class repair ship 2". Archived from the original on 18 October 2018.
- Jiawen, Jia (26 July 2015). "Yongjia Deng Yongjia Ship Memorial 66 years ago bloody battle".
