= Naval Base Alexishafen =

World War 2 base in New Guinea

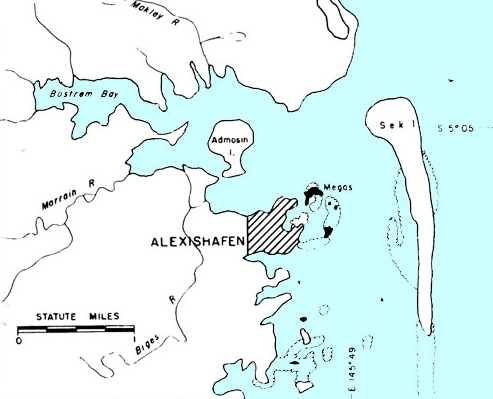

- Location of Naval Base Alexishafen in Papua New Guinea
- Coordinates: 5.089040°S 145.804056°E
- Country: Papua New Guinea
- Province: Madang Province
- Naval Base: United States Navy
- Established Closed: June 13, 1944; January 28, 1945
- Time zone: UTC+10 (AEST)
- Climate: Af

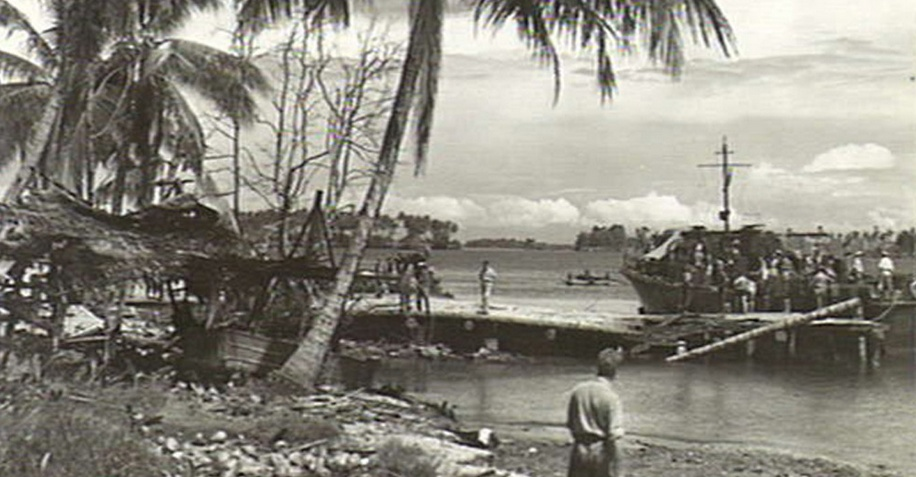
A Naval Base Alexishafen dock in 1944

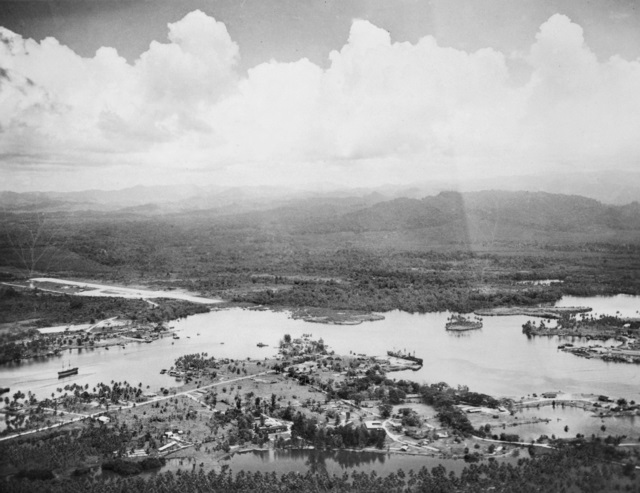
Madang harbour in October 1945

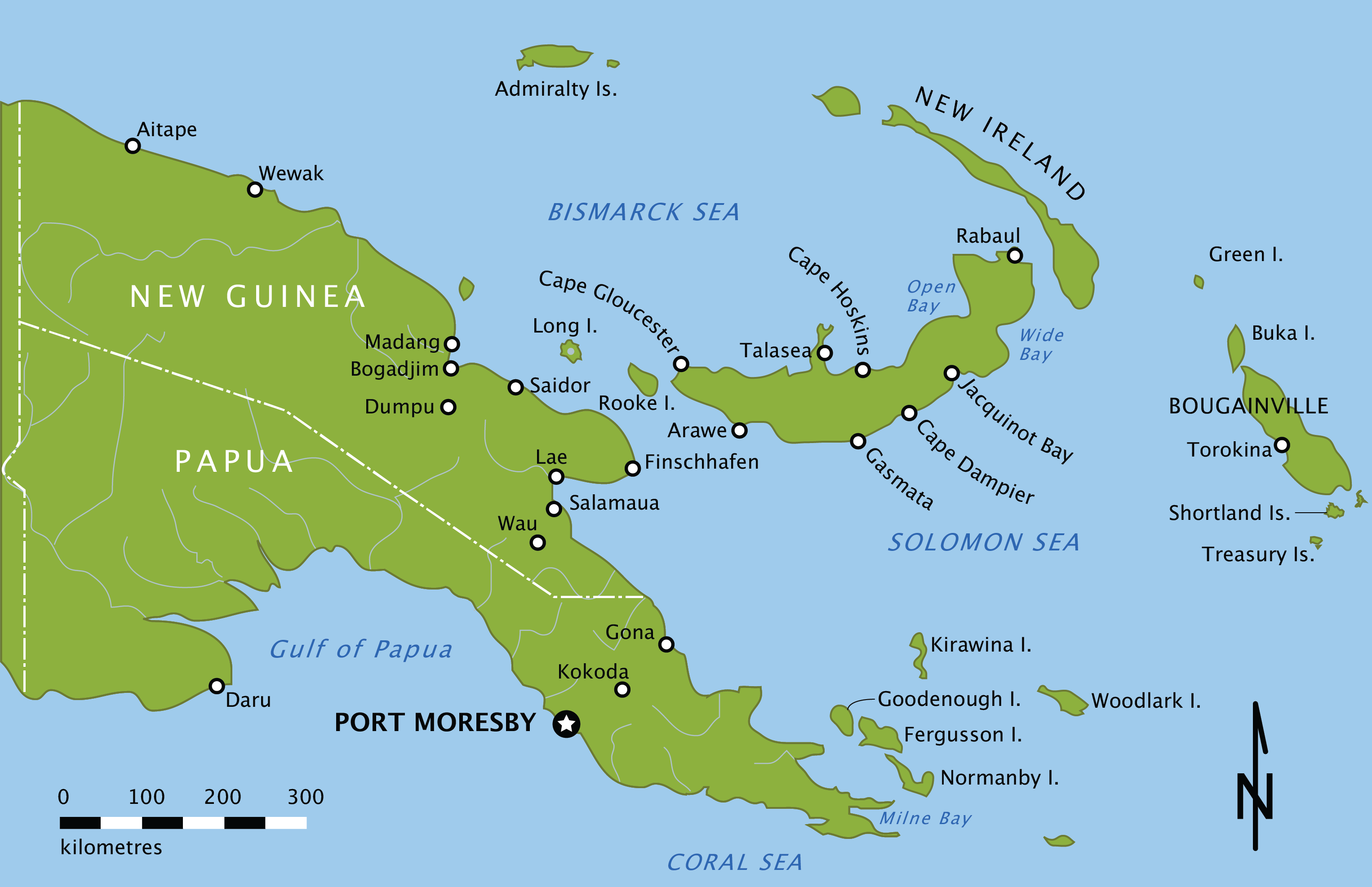
Map of East New Guinea, with Madang (Alexishafen)

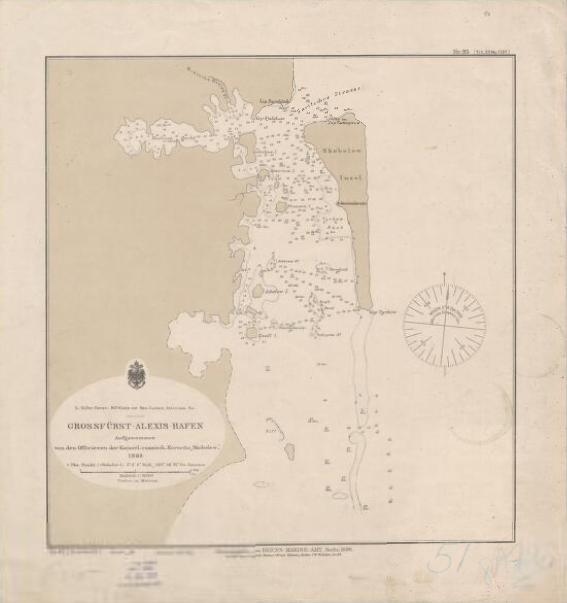
1883 map of Alexishafen

Naval Base Alexishafen (Naval Base Alexishafen-Madang) was a United States Navy base built during World War II at Alexishafen, north of the city of Madang in New Guinea. The base was built by the US Navy Seabees starting June 13, 1944 as part of the New Guinea campaign of the Pacific War. The base was built at the request of the Seventh Amphibious Force of the United States Seventh Fleet to support the many boats patrolling the area. The US Navy built a boat repair depot including Auxiliary floating drydocks. The base was closed in January 28, 1945.

== History ==
In May 1944, the US Navy's 7th Amphibious Force requested a base at Alexishafen to provide repair and logistical support for the many boats operating off the north shores of New Guinea. Alexishafen and Madang were liberated on April 26, 1944, by the Australian Army 30th Battalion in the Battle of Madang. Alexishafen's Bostrem Bay offered excellent fleet anchorage. The US Navy began using Bostrem Bay on April 27, 1944, when a destroyer Anchored at Alexishafen. Construction started on June 13, 1944, with the arrival of 200 troops with the US Navy's Seabee 91st Construction Battalion. The troops and supplies had arrived from Naval Base Finschhafen and Naval Base Milne Bay. Base facilities were built on Alexishafen south peninsula, Megas Island and Ulimal Island. All construction was completed on August 17, 1944. Australian had a base at Madang, including a capture runway, Madang Airfield. The Australians built a seaplane base in Madang Bay, used by the US Navy also. By November 1944 the Alexishafen base was too far behind the current Navy action and parts of the base were moved to more forward bases. On December 25, 1944, 80 troops from the 91st Construction Battalion packed up parts of the base to be shipped out to forward bases. The US Navy closed the base on January 28, 1945. The Alexishafen water-supply system was transferred to the Royal Australian Navy.

== Bases and facilities ==
- Madang:
- Madang Bay fleet Anchorage at 5.208547°S 145.796889°E
- Madang Airfield Australian, used by US Army and US Navy also.
- Madang Seaplane Base, RAAF used by US Navy also
- Fleet Post Office FPO# 928 SF Madang
- Alexishafen:
- Bostrem Bay - Sek Harbor fleet Anchorage at 5.083120°S 145.804056°E
- Alexishafen boat repair depot
- Alexishafen freshwater supply system for base and ships
- Two 3,500-ton drydock type AFD
- USS Achilles (ARL-41) and USS Remus (ARL-40) repair ships in Sek Harbor
- USS Culebra Island (ARG-7) engine repair ship in Sek Harbor
- USS Rigel (AD-13) destroyer tender in Sek Harbor
- USS Midas (ARB-5) repair ship
- Seabee Camp
- Seabee depot
- Supply Depot
- Repair Depot
- Repair base camp, barracks and mess hall
- Power plant
- PT boat Base, including PT-341
- Machine shops
- Ammunition depot
- Fuel Tank farm
- Megas Island, base support facilities at 5.087851°S 145.808042°E
- Ulimal Island, base support facilities

== See also ==
- US Naval Advance Bases
- Naval Base Port Moresby
- Naval Base Milne Bay
- Naval Base Mios Woendi
- Naval Base Lae
- US Naval Base New Guinea
