= USS Cebu =

United States Navy WWII-era repair ship

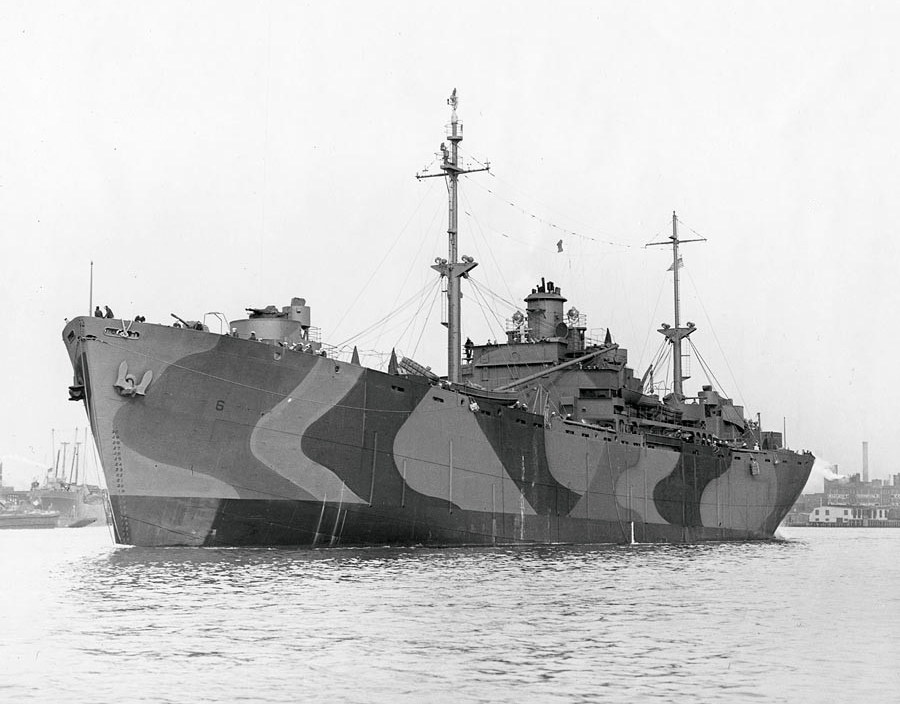
- USS Cebu (ARG-6) in Chesapeake Bay off the Bethlehem Steel Key Highway Yard, Baltimore, 18 April 1944, one day after completing her conversion to an Internal Combustion Engine Repair Ship. The ship is painted in Camouflage Measure 31, Design 6Ax.

History

United States
- Name: Francis P. Duffy; Cebu
- Namesake: Francis P. Duffy; Cebu
- Ordered: as a Type EC2-S-C1 hull, MCE hull 1805
- Builder: Bethlehem-Fairfield Shipyard, Baltimore, Maryland
- Yard number: 2253
- Laid down: 21 September 1943
- Launched: 18 October 1943
- Acquired: 27 October 1943
- Commissioned: 15 April 1944
- Decommissioned: 30 June 1947
- Identification: Hull symbol: ARG-6; Code letters: NPZL
- Honors and awards: 1 battle star (WWII)
- Fate: Laid up, Pacific Reserve Fleet, Stockton, California, 30 September 1947; Transferred, National Defense Reserve Fleet, Suisun Bay, California, 4 August 1961; Sold for scrapping, 18 October 1973, withdrawn from fleet, 14 November 1973

General characteristics
- Class & type: Luzon-class Internal Combustion Engine Repair Ship
- Type: Type EC2-S-C1
- Displacement: 4,023 long tons (4,088 t) (light load); 14,350 long tons (14,580 t) (full load)
- Length: 441 ft 6 in (134.57 m)
- Beam: 56 ft 11 in (17.35 m)
- Draft: 23 ft (7.0 m)
- Installed power: 2 × Babcock & Wilcox header-type boilers, 220 psi (1,500 kPa) 450 °F (232 °C); 2,500 shp (1,900 kW)
- Propulsion: 1 × General Machine Corporation vertical triple expansion engines; 1 x propeller
- Speed: 12.5 kn (23.2 km/h; 14.4 mph) (ship's trials)
- Complement: 31 officers, 552 enlisted
- Armament: 1 × 5 in (127 mm)/38 caliber dual purpose (DP) gun; 1 × 3 in (76 mm)/50 caliber (DP) gun; 2 × twin 40 mm (1.6 in) Bofors anti-aircraft (AA) gun mounts; 12 × single 20 mm (0.8 in) Oerlikon cannons AA mounts

USS Cebu (ARG-6) was a Luzon-class internal combustion engine repair ship that saw service in the United States Navy during World War II. The ship was named after Cebu, an island in the Philippines.

== Construction ==
Cebu was laid down 21 September 1943, as liberty ship SS Francis P. Duffy, under a Maritime Commission (MARCOM) contract, MCE hull 1805, by the Bethlehem-Fairfield Shipyard, Inc., in Baltimore, Maryland; launched 18 October 1943; sponsored by Mrs. M. C. Bird; acquired by the Navy 27 October 1943; and commissioned 15 April 1944.

== Service history ==
Cebu's special mission was providing shops and trained men for the repair of internal combustion engines, but through the course of the war, her men performed a variety of tasks, ranging from the repairing of ship's clocks to major work on battleships. She arrived at Manus in the Admiralty Islands 10 September 1944. At this fleet base, she prepared small craft and larger ships for their role in the Philippine operations, working many times around the clock in order to insure the readiness of ships vital to the invasion assaults.

=== Mount Hood explosion ===
At Manus on 10 November 1944, Cebu was anchored only 800 yd (730 m) from Mount Hood when the ammunition ship exploded, showering Cebu's decks with bomb fragments and heavy projectiles. Five of her men were killed and six wounded, but quick work prevented serious damage to the ship itself. She was able to continue her work without interruption, preparing ships for the Lingayen and Iwo Jima assaults.

== Philippines and occupation duty ==
Cebu was stationed at Ulithi from 22 January to 12 February 1945, when she sailed for San Pedro Bay. Her work continued at a furious rate as victims of suicide attacks required immediate repairs. Her services to small craft at Leyte continued until 21 September, when she sailed for occupation duties at Okinawa and Japan until 11 March 1946.

== Operation "Crossroads" ==
Cebu prepared at Pearl Harbor from 29 March to 11 May 1945, for her role supporting the atomic tests of Operation Crossroads at Bikini and Kwajalein in the summer of 1946.

== Decommissioning ==
She arrived at San Diego, California, 28 September, and was placed out of commission in the Pacific Reserve Fleet at Stockton, California, 30 June 1947.

On 4 August 1961, Cebu was transferred to the National Defense Reserve Fleet at Suisun Bay, California. Her name reverted to Francis P. Duffy and she was struck from the Naval Register on 1 September 1962.

== Fate ==
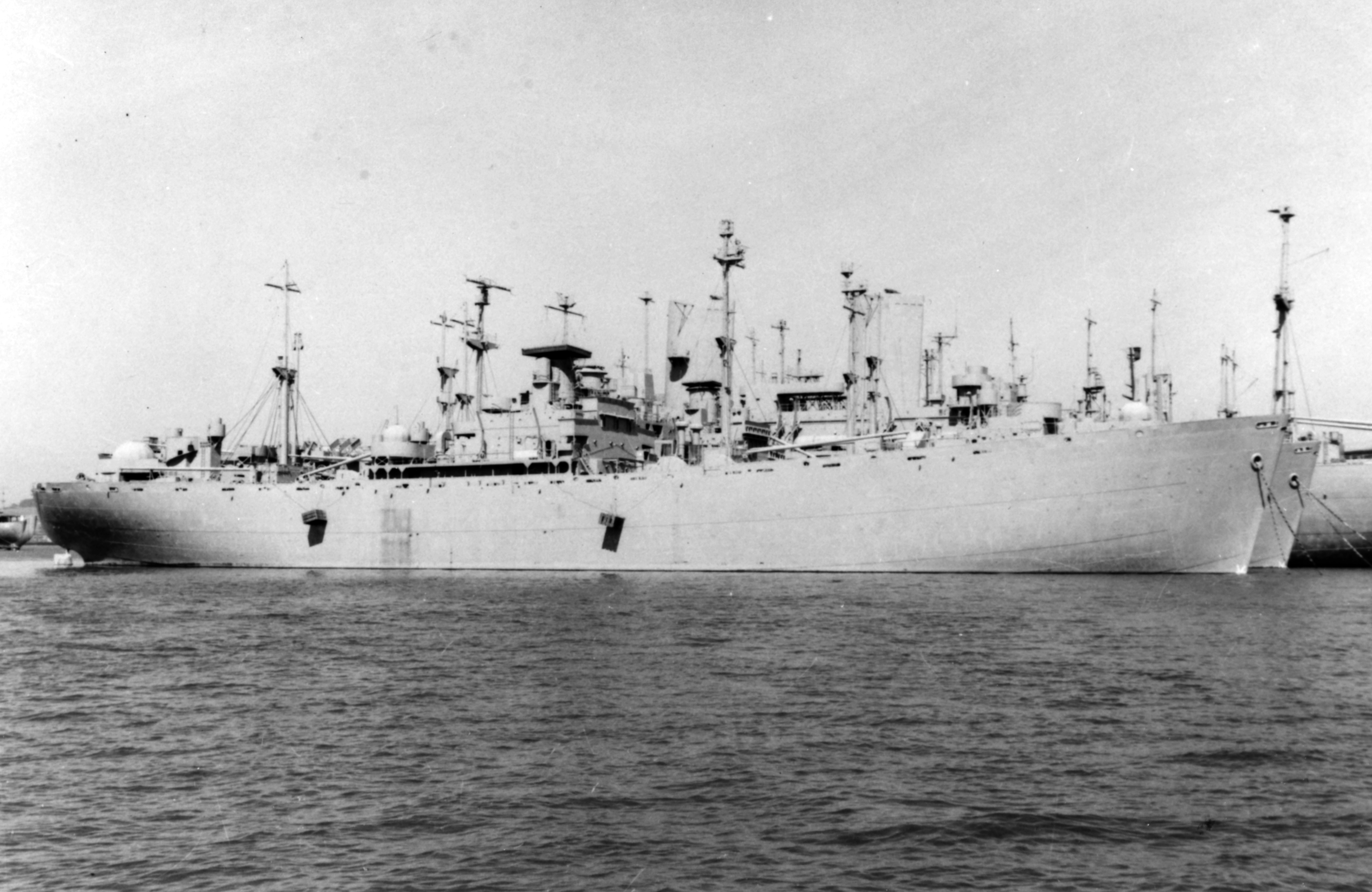
SS Francis P. Duffey [ex-USS Cebu (ARG-6)] laid up in reserve at Suisun Bay, CA., 27 July 1972.

On 18 October 1973, Francis P. Duffy was sold to Zidell Explorations Inc., for $151,899.99 to be scrapped. She was withdrawn from on 14 November 1973.

== Awards ==
Cebu received one battle star for World War II service.

== Bibliography ==
=== Online resources ===
- "Cebu". Dictionary of American Naval Fighting Ships. Naval History and Heritage Command. This article incorporates text from this source, which is in the public domain.
- "Bethlehem-Fairfield, Baltimore MD". www.ShipbuildingHistory.com. 14 August 2008.
- "USS Cebu (ARG-6)". NavSource. 19 August 2016.
- "CEBU (ARG-6)". United States Department of Transportation. Archived from the original on November 4, 2016.
