= USS Hooper Island =

US Navy Luzon-class ship

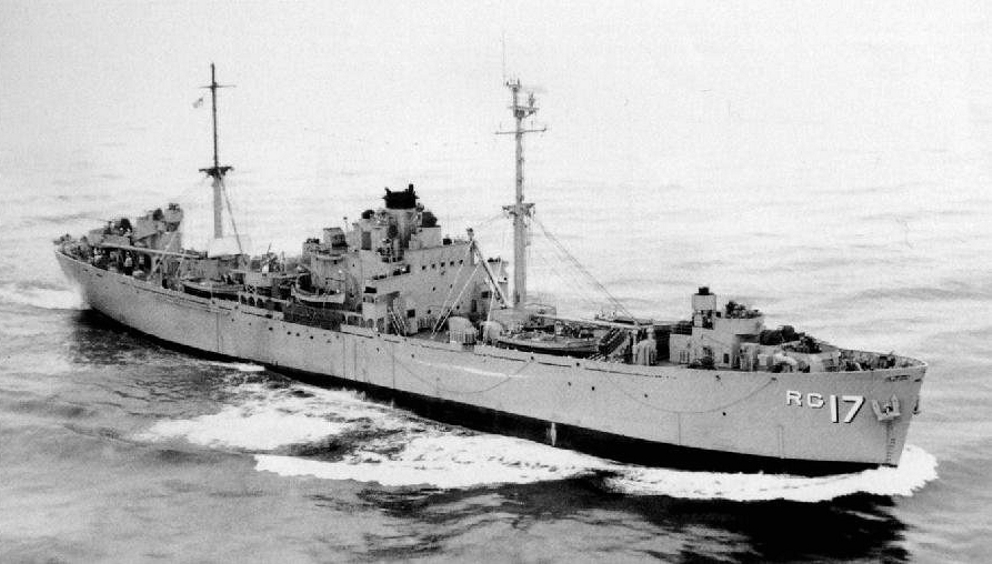

History

United States
- Name: Hooper Island
- Namesake: Hooper's Island
- Builder: Bethlehem Fairfield Shipyard, Inc
- Laid down: 16 September 1944
- Launched: 30 October 1944
- Commissioned: 13 July 1945
- Decommissioned: 15 July 1959
- In service: 1945
- Out of service: 1959
- Stricken: 1 July 1960
- Fate: Sold for scrapping, 2 November 1960
- Notes: Hull number: ARG-17; Ship International Radio Callsign: NKFP

General characteristics
- Class & type: Luzon-class repair ship
- Displacement: 5,159 t.(lt) 14,350 t.(limiting)
- Length: 441 ft 6 in (134.57 m)
- Beam: 56 ft 11 in (17.35 m)
- Draft: 23 ft (7.0 m)
- Complement: 30 officers, 471 enlisted
- Armament: 1 × 5-inch/38 cal. gun dual purpose mount; 3 × 3-inch/50 cal. dual purpose mounts; 2 × twin 40 mm AA mounts

USS Hooper Island (ARG-17) was a Luzon-class repair ship designated for internal combustion engine repair in service with the United States Navy from 1945 to 1948 and from 1952 to 1959. She was sold for scrapping in 1960.

== History ==
Hooper Island, the ex-Liberty ship SS Bert McDowell, was launched 30 October 1944, by Bethlehem-Fairfield Shipyards Inc. at their yard in Fairfield, Maryland, under a Maritime Commission contract, sponsored by Mrs. Hattie Singer, and commissioned on 13 July 1945.

After shakedown off the Virginia coast, Hooper Island departed 1 September 1945, for the western Pacific and reached Sasebo, Japan, 9 November, to provide repair services to the Pacific Fleet. She remained there on repair duty until 31 October 1946, when she sailed for Qingdao, China, to perform similar services in support of US operations to stabilize China. Hooper Island completed her deployment 14 August 1947, when she sailed for San Francisco, arriving there 5 September. She remained there until she was decommissioned at Alameda, California, 24 January 1948 and joined the National Defense Reserve Fleet.

=== Korean War ===
With the outbreak of the Korean War, and the need for additional vessels to halt Communist aggression, Hooper Island was recommissioned 12 April 1952. After shakedown and repair duty on the west coast, Hooper Island sailed from Long Beach, California on 3 December 1952 bound for the trouble-filled waters of the Far East. From December 1952 until December 1955 she made three deployments to the Western Pacific in support of the 7th Fleet, thereby playing a major role in America's determination to stop the spread of communism. From August 1954 to July 1955 she supported units of the fleet when they evacuated almost 300,000 citizens of North Vietnam (scheduled to be handed over to Communist authority) to the South. Vietnamese President Diem responded to this humanitarian operation known as "Passage to Freedom" by saying: "In the name of all that you have helped, in the name of those who far away are hoping, in the name of all my compatriots whom you have brought south of the 17th parallel... with all my heart I thank you."

=== Post-war ===
Hooper Island resumed her repair services at Long Beach, California, 5 December 1955 then shifted to San Diego on 30 April 1956. After repair services at San Diego she arrived Seattle to undergo an overhaul. While in Seattle she performed repair services for two icebreakers engaged in Operation Deep-Freeze in the Antarctic. She resumed her duties at San Diego 28 October and remained there until early 1958. On 15 March, Hooper Island sailed for repair operations in the Marshall Islands, returning to San Diego 19 July where she decommissioned and once again joined the Reserve Fleet 15 July 1959, where she remained until struck from the Navy List 1 July 1960. On 2 November 1960, she was sold for scrap and was removed from Suisun Bay on 5 November 1970.

== Awards ==
- American Campaign Medal
- United Nations Service Medal
- National Defense Service Medal
- Asiatic-Pacific Campaign Medal
- Korean Service Medal (2)
- Republic of Korea War Service Medal (retroactive)
- China Service Medal (extended)
- World War II Victory Medal
- Navy Occupation Service Medal (with Asia clasp)
- Hooper Island earned two Battle Stars for Korean War service.
