= USS Oahu (ARG-5) =

United States Navy vessel

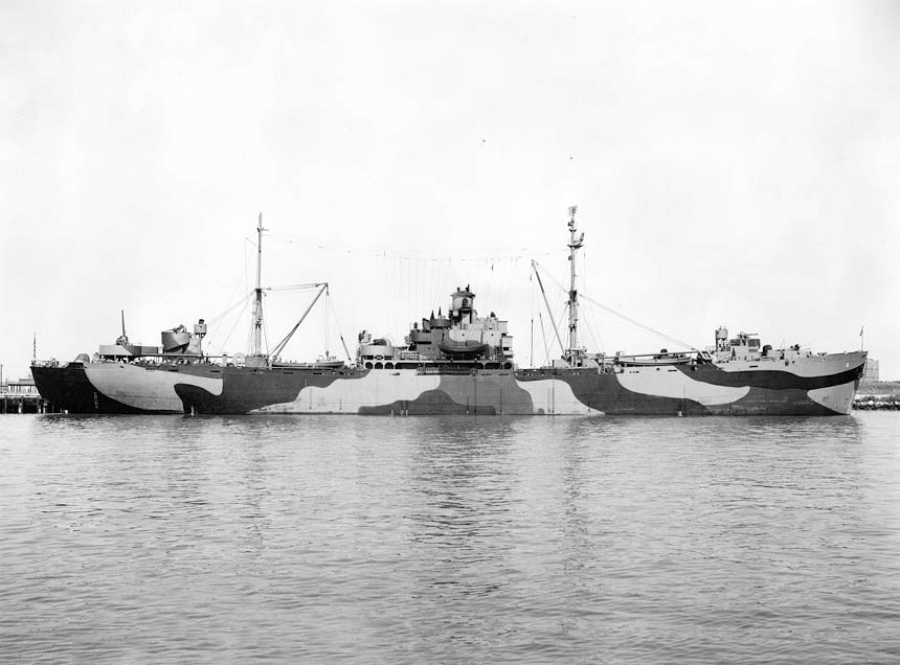
- USS Oahu (ARG-5) moored at Norfolk Navy Yard, 12 May 1944.

History

United States
- Name: Caleb C. Wheeler; Oahu
- Namesake: Caleb C. Wheeler; Oahu
- Ordered: as a Type EC2-S-C1 hull, MCE hull 1782
- Builder: Bethlehem-Fairfield Shipyard, Baltimore, Maryland
- Yard number: 2230
- Way number: 3
- Laid down: 14 August 1943
- Launched: 9 September 1943
- Acquired: 15 September 1943
- Commissioned: 4 April 1944
- Decommissioned: 7 January 1947
- Identification: Hull symbol: ARG-5; Code letters: NPZB
- Honors and awards: 1 battle star (WWII)
- Fate: Laid up, Pacific Reserve Fleet, San Diego, California, 7 January 1947; Transferred, National Defense Reserve Fleet, Suisun Bay, California, 13 March 1961; Sold for scrapping, 27 March 1978, withdrawn from fleet, 6 July 1978

General characteristics
- Class & type: Luzon-class Internal Combustion Engine Repair Ship
- Type: Type EC2-S-C1
- Displacement: 4,023 long tons (4,088 t) (light load); 14,350 long tons (14,580 t) (full load)
- Length: 441 ft 6 in (134.57 m)
- Beam: 56 ft 11 in (17.35 m)
- Draft: 23 ft (7.0 m)
- Installed power: 2 × Babcock & Wilcox header-type boilers, 220 psi (1,500 kPa) 450 °F (232 °C); 2,500 shp (1,900 kW)
- Propulsion: 1 × General Machine Corporation vertical triple expansion engines; 1 x propeller
- Speed: 12.5 kn (23.2 km/h; 14.4 mph) (ship's trials)
- Complement: 31 officers, 552 enlisted
- Armament: 1 × 5 in (127 mm)/38 caliber dual purpose (DP) gun; 1 × 3 in (76 mm)/50 caliber (DP) gun; 2 × twin 40 mm (1.6 in) Bofors anti-aircraft (AA) gun mounts; 12 × single 20 mm (0.8 in) Oerlikon cannons AA mounts

USS Oahu (ARG-5) was a Luzon-class internal combustion engine repair ship that saw service in the United States Navy during World War II. Named for the Island of Oahu, third largest island in the Hawaiian chain, it was the second US Naval vessel to bear the name.

== Construction ==
Oahu was laid down 14 August 1943, as the liberty ship SS Caleb C. Wheeler, under a Maritime Commission (MARCOM) contract, MCE hull 1782, by the Bethlehem-Fairfield Shipyard, Inc., in Baltimore, Maryland; launched 9 September 1943; sponsored by Mrs. O. F. Hurt; acquired by the Navy from MARCOM 15 September 1943; converted by the Maryland Drydock Company, Baltimore, Maryland; and commissioned 4 April 1944.

== Service history ==
Following a Chesapeake Bay shakedown, the repair ship Oahu departed Hampton Roads, Virginia, 16 May 1944, steaming south and then west. Transiting the Panama Canal, she headed out into the Pacific. On 8 July, she arrived at Eniwetok and on 11 July, began repairing the damaged vessels of the Pacific Fleet.

Oahu remained based at Eniwetok for the greater part of the next eight months. There she kept Allied vessels, naval and merchant, in trim and prepared them for the Philippine and Iwo Jima operations. Moving forward to Ulithi at the end of February 1945, she serviced the ships gathering for the invasion of Okinawa during March and then returned to the Marshalls. Oahu continued her work at Eniwetok until 6 December, when she got underway for the United States.

== Decommissioning and post-war ==
Arriving at San Pedro, California, 25 December, Oahu, having repaired over two thousand ships during the war, was ordered to San Diego, California, to complete repair and pre-inactivation work on vessels going into mothballs.

On 22 November she herself was ordered inactivated, and decommissioned in January 1947. She was berthed at San Diego as a unit of the Pacific Reserve Fleet until transferred 13 March 1962, and laid up at Suisun Bay. On 1 July 1963, she was permanently transferred to the Maritime Administration (MARAD). She remained there as a unit of the National Defense Reserve Fleet until being sold to General Metals of Tacoma, Inc., on 27 March 1978. She was withdrawn 7 June 1978, for scrapping.

== Awards ==
Oahu received one battle star for World War II service.

== Bibliography ==
=== Online resources ===
- "Oahu II (ARG-5)". Dictionary of American Naval Fighting Ships. Naval History and Heritage Command. 17 August 2015. This article incorporates text from this source, which is in the public domain.
- "Bethlehem-Fairfield, Baltimore MD". www.ShipbuildingHistory.com. 14 August 2008.
- "USS Oahu (ARG-5)". NavSource. 21 November 2014.
- "OAHU (ARG-5)". United States Department of Transportation. Archived from the original on December 6, 2015.
