= USS Agenor =

Achelous-class World War II ship

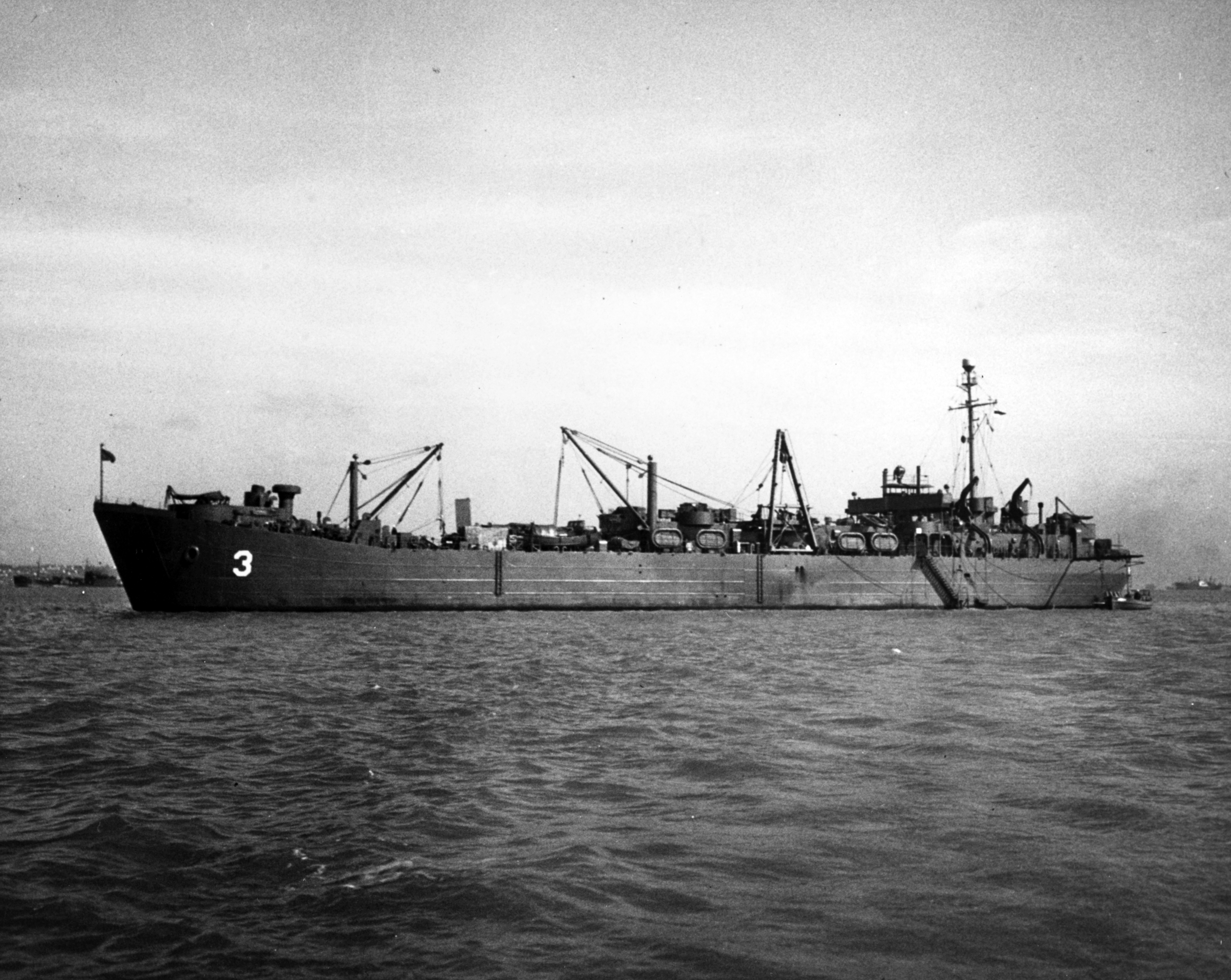
- USS Agenor in 1945

History

United States
- Name: Agenor
- Namesake: Agenor
- Builder: Permanente Metals Corporation, Richmond
- Yard number: 45
- Laid down: 24 January 1943
- Launched: 3 April 1943
- Commissioned: 20 August 1943
- Decommissioned: 15 November 1946
- Reclassified: ARL-3, 13 January 1943
- Stricken: 26 March 1951
- Identification: Callsign: NJVB; Hull number: LST-490
- Honors and awards: See Awards
- Fate: Transferred to France, 2 March 1951

France
- Name: Vulcain
- Namesake: Vulcain
- Acquired: 2 March 1951
- Stricken: 26 March 1951
- Identification: Hull number: A656
- Fate: Transferred to the Republic of China, 15 September 1957

Republic of China
- Name: Song Shan; (嵩山)
- Namesake: Mount Song
- Acquired: 30 September 1957
- Commissioned: 1 November 1957
- Renamed: Wu Tai, 1 August 1968; (五台)
- Namesake: Wu Tai
- Decommissioned: April 1983
- Reclassified: ARL-236; AP-520, 1968
- Identification: Hull number: ARL-336

General characteristics
- Class & type: Achelous-class repair ship
- Displacement: 3,900 long tons (4,000 t) (light); 4,100 long tons (4,200 t) (full load)
- Length: 328 ft (100 m)
- Beam: 50 ft (15 m)
- Draft: 11 ft 2 in (3.40 m)
- Installed power: 2 × Electro-Motive Diesel 12-567A diesel engines; 1,800 shp (1,300 kW)
- Propulsion: 1 × Falk main reduction gears; 2 × Propellers
- Speed: 12 kn (22 km/h; 14 mph)
- Complement: 22 officers, 233 enlisted men
- Armament: 1 × 3-inch (76 mm)/50 caliber dual-purpose gun 2 × quad 40 millimetres (1.57 in) Bofors anti-aircraft (AA) guns 6 × twin 20 millimetres (0.79 in) Oerlikon AA cannons

Service record
- Operations: Capture and occupation of Saipan (25 June–21 July 1944); Capture and occupation of Guam (1–15 August 1944); Tinian Capture and occupation (24–31 July 1944); Assault and occupation of Iwo Jima (19 February–16 March 1945)
- Awards: American Campaign Medal; Asiatic–Pacific Campaign Medal; World War II Victory Medal

USS Agenor (ARL-3) was one of 39 Achelous-class repair ship landing craft repair ships built for the United States Navy during World War II. Named for Agenor (in history and in Greek mythology, a king of Tyre), she was the only U.S. Naval vessel to bear the name.

== Construction and career ==
Originally projected as LST-490, an LST-1-class tank landing ship, this ship was redesignated ARL-3 and named Agenor on 13 January 1943. She was laid down on 24 January 1943, MC hull 1010, by Kaiser Shipyards, Yard No. 4, Richmond, California; launched on 3 April 1943; and commissioned at San Francisco, on 20 August 1943.

=== Service in the United States Navy ===
From December 1943 through 9 June 1944, Agenor provided repair services to numerous landing craft operating in the Solomon, Russell, and Marshall Islands. On 9 June, the repair ship got underway for the Marianas. Eight days later, Japanese torpedo bombers attacked Agenor's convoy. Despite several near misses, the ship continued on safely to waters off Saipan where she arrived on 24 June.

Agenor was then assigned duty with a salvage group, Task Group 52.7 (TG 52.7). While air raids were a constant threat, the vessel carried out her work successfully. On 15 July, she moved to Tinian to supply services to invasion forces there.

The ship sailed to Guam in early August, and reported to Task Force 53 (TF 53). That island was her base of operations through 2 October, when the ship shifted to Ulithi in the Carolines. Agenor returned to Guam on 10 February 1945, to prepare for the Iwo Jima landings.

On 20 February, the repair ship arrived off Iwo Jima and joined TG 51.3. During the operations there, Agenor carried out her work despite air attack and heavy seas. The ship remained at Iwo Jima until 25 June. She then got underway for Saipan, where she dropped anchor on 29 June.

Soon after reporting to Service Squadron 10 for duty, Agenor left Saipan bound for Hawaii and a much-needed overhaul. The vessel reached Pearl Harbor on 18 July and entered the navy yard. The Japanese surrender found the ship still undergoing repairs at Pearl Harbor. Upon completion of the yard work, Agenor served in the Hawaiian operating area until placed out of commission, in reserve, on 15 November 1946.

=== Service in the French Navy ===
Agenor was transferred to the government of France on 2 March 1951, under the terms of the Mutual Defense Assistance Act and renamed RFS Vulcain (A656). Her name was struck from the Naval Vessel Register on 26 March 1951.

In 1952, she was present in Indochina to support the First Indochina War by transporting troops and repairing launching crafts.

She took part in Operation Hirondelle in July 1953.

On 15 September 1957, she was transferred to the Republic of China with the help of the United States.

Vulcain participating in Operation Hirondelle, July 1953

=== Service in the Republic of China Navy ===
Transferred by France to the Republic of China Navy in 1957 and renamed ROCS Shung Shan (ARL-336). The ship was handed over to Taiwan by the United States in Subic Bay, Philippines on 15 September 1957. Only by 20 September 1957, she arrived in Taiwan to be commissioned.

Before the ship was received, Taiwan had a self-modified repair ship. It was during the 1952 Retreat of the Government of the Republic of China to Taiwan on the offshore islands of Zhejiang. Due to the serious damage of the other repair ship, the ship returned to Keelung was too time-consuming and dangerous for repairs, so she had to choice but to be in combat. The landing ship ROCS Chung Chuan (LST-221) was converted into a repair ship and renamed ROCS Heng Shan (ARL-335), and was stationed at the battlefield. When the Song Shan was put into service in 1957, Heng Shan was changed again but back to the original name and number.

She was later renamed ROCS Tai Wu (AP-520) in 1968.

The ship was decommissioned in April 1983.

== Awards ==
Agenor earned three battle stars for her World War II service.

== Notes ==
Citations

== Bibliography ==
Online resources

- "Agenor (ARL-3)". Dictionary of American Naval Fighting Ships. Naval History and Heritage Command. 31 August 2016. This article incorporates text from this source, which is in the public domain.
- "Kaiser Permanente No. 4, Richmond CA". ShipbuildingHistory.com. 5 February 2014.
- "USS Agenor (ARL-3)". NavSource. 14 February 2014.
- Silverstone, Paul H. (2009). The Navy of the Nuclear Age - 1947–2007. New York and London: Routledge. ISBN 978-0-415-97899-6.
