= USS Burias =

Cargo ship of the United States Navy

- USS Burias underway in Mobile Bay, Alabama, 13 October 1944, after completing conversion for naval service.

History

United States
- Name: Burias
- Namesake: Burias Island located in the Philippines
- Ordered: as Internal Combustion Engine Repair Ship ARG-13
- Builder: Delta Shipbuilding Corp., New Orleans, Louisiana
- Laid down: 11 February 1944, as SS Mollie Moore Davis
- Launched: 27 March 1944
- Sponsored by: Mrs. Paul L. Jahncke
- Acquired: by the Navy, 24 April 1944
- Commissioned: 24 April 1944 as USS Burias (AG-69) at Mobile, Alabama
- Decommissioned: 9 April 1946, at Pearl Harbor, Territory of Hawaii
- Reclassified: AG-69, 14 March 1944
- Refit: Alabama Drydock Company, Mobile, Alabama
- Stricken: 17 July 1947
- Fate: for scrapping, 2 November 1970
- Notes: EC-2-S-C1 hull, (MCE hull 2458)

General characteristics
- Type: Basilan-class miscellaneous auxiliary
- Displacement: 5,371 tons light; 14,350 tons full load
- Length: 441 ft 6 in (134.57 m)
- Beam: 56 ft 11 in (17.35 m)
- Draft: 23 ft (7.0 m)
- Propulsion: reciprocating steam engine, single shaft, 1,950hp
- Speed: 12.5 knots
- Complement: 927 officers and enlisted
- Armament: one single 5 in (130 mm) dual-purpose gun mount; three 3 in (76 mm) dual-purpose gun mounts; our single 40 mm AA gun mounts; twelve single 20 mm AA gun mounts

USS Burias (AG-69/ARG-13) was a Basilan-class miscellaneous auxiliary acquired by the U.S. Navy during World War II. She was heavily armed and converted into a repair ship and spent her career in the South Pacific Ocean. At war's end she was used to transport troops home from the war.

== Constructed in New Orleans, Louisiana ==
Burias (AG-69) was laid down on 11 February 1944 at New Orleans, Louisiana, by the Delta Shipbuilding Company, Inc., under a U.S. Maritime Commission contract (MCE hull 2458) as Mollie Moore Davis; launched on 27 March 1944; sponsored by Mrs. Paul L. Jahncke; delivered to the Navy on 24 April 1944; converted for naval service at Mobile, Alabama, by the Alabama Drydock Company; and commissioned there on 9 October 1944.

== World War II service ==
Burias conducted shakedown training in Chesapeake Bay. Following a final outfitting at Norfolk, Virginia, she got underway for the Pacific Ocean early in December. After a month-long voyage during which she transited the Panama Canal, the ship arrived at Pearl Harbor on 7 January 1945.

At the Oahu base, she underwent conversion to an electronics repair ship. She completed the conversion within two months and, early in March, received orders to join that portion of Service Squadron (ServRon) 10 stationed at Saipan in the Mariana Islands. There, she spent the remainder of World War II working in conjunction with Hector and Luzon making hull and electronic repairs to warships damaged at Iwo Jima and in the long Okinawa campaign.

=== End-of-war operations ===
She departed Saipan on 30 October 1945 and arrived at Wakayama, Japan, on 5 November. Burias took on board servicemen on their way home at Wakayama and got underway for the U.S. West Coast on 10 November 1945. The ship arrived at San Francisco, California, on 28 November and disembarked her passengers. Two days later, she put to sea bound for Bremerton, Washington.

== Post-war inactivation ==
She reached Bremerton on 3 December and soon began decommissioning preparations. The ship then moved to Seattle, Washington, on 23 January 1946 for the removal of her 20 millimeter antiaircraft guns and of some electronics equipment still on board.

== Temporary reactivation ==
On 11 February, however, decommissioning preparations stopped, and she got underway for Hawaii with passengers embarked. Burias entered Pearl Harbor on 21 February, disembarked her passengers, and resumed stripping operations.

== Final dispositioning ==
She was placed out of commission at Pearl Harbor on 9 April 1946. Burias remained in Hawaii until March 1947 at which time she was towed to San Francisco. Declared surplus to the needs of the Navy late in June, she had her name struck from the Navy List on 17 July 1947.

On 15 August 1947, the ship was turned over to the U.S. Maritime Commission to be laid up with the National Defense Reserve Fleet group berthed at Suisun Bay, California. She remained there for more than two decades until 2 November 1970 when she was sold to Zidell Explorations, Inc., of Portland, Oregon, for scrapping.
