= USS Medusa (AR-1) =

Repair ship

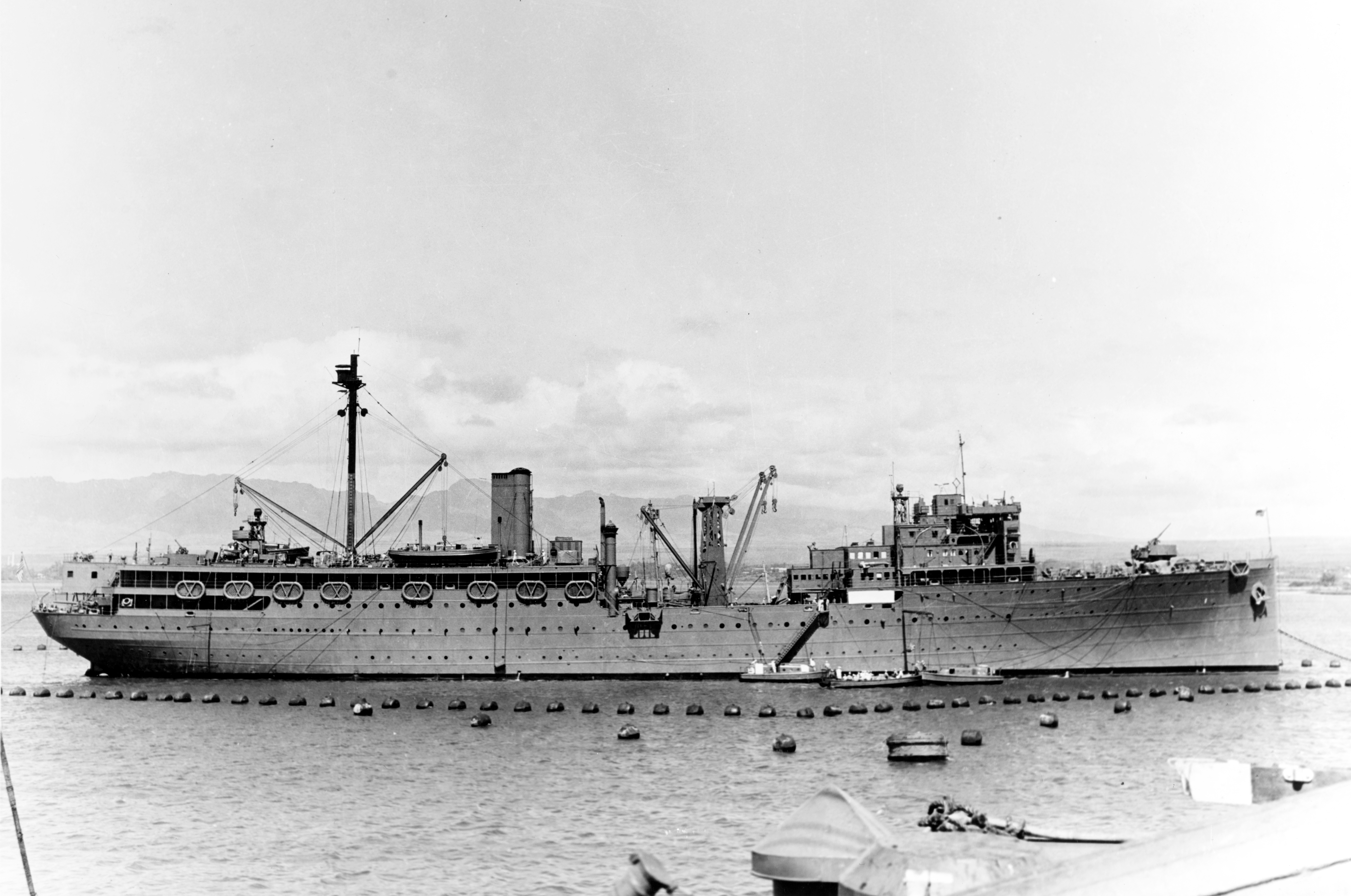
- USS Medusa at Pearl Harbor in February 1942, surrounded by floats supporting anti-torpedo netting

History

United States
- Name: USS Medusa
- Namesake: USS Medusa, a monitor launched in 1869
- Builder: Puget Sound Navy Yard, Bremerton, Washington
- Laid down: 2 January 1920
- Launched: 16 April 1923
- Commissioned: 18 September 1924
- Decommissioned: 18 November 1946
- Stricken: 10 June 1947
- Honors and awards: One battle star for World War II service
- Fate: Sold for scrapping 24 August 1950
- Notes: Designated AR-1 on 17 July 1920

General characteristics
- Type: Repair ship
- Displacement: 10,620 tons (8,125 tons standard)
- Length: 483 ft 10 in (147.47 m)
- Beam: 70 ft 3 in (21.41 m)
- Draft: 19 ft 11 in (6.07 m)
- Installed power: 7,000 shp
- Propulsion: steam turbines
- Speed: 16 kn (30 km/h)
- Complement: 499
- Armament: 4 × 5"/51 caliber guns; 2 × 3 in (76 mm)/50 cal guns
- Armor: none
- Notes: The U.S. Navy's first purpose-built repair ship

USS Medusa (AR-1) was the United States Navy's first purpose-built repair ship. She served in the U.S. Navy from 1924 to 1946.

== Technical characteristics ==
Authorized as part of the naval programs of 1916 and 1918, Medusa was laid down at the Puget Sound Navy Yard, Bremerton, Washington, on 2 January 1920. She was launched on 16 April 1923, sponsored by Mrs. Burns Poe, and commissioned on 18 September 1924.

Medusa was the first U.S. Navy ship designed as a fleet repair ship for major repairs beyond the fighting ship's own capabilities but which must be accomplished without the benefit of visiting a shipyard. Prior to the commissioning of Medusa, U.S. Navy repair ships had been converted for that purpose. As the U.S. Navy began to grow in size during the World War I years, it was felt that such conversions would prove inadequate for the Navy's needs.

The Department of the Navy designed Medusa with an eye toward at least equalling the repair facilities of the repair ship Vestal, which had been converted from a collier. Medusa was conceived as primarily a tender for battleship divisions, and so was given a speed and range that would allow her to work with the U.S. Navy's newest dreadnought battleships. Originally designated "Repair Ship No. 1", she was redesignated AR-1 when the Navy assigned alphanumeric hull numbers to all of its ships on 17 July 1920.

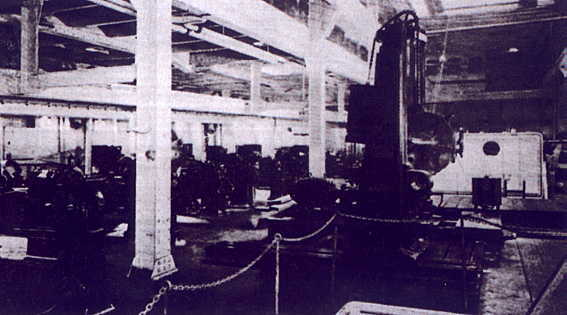
The machine shop of Medusa around the time of her commissioning in 1924.

Medusa commissioned as a very modern repair ship by the standards of 1924, capable of blacksmith work, boiler repairs, carpentry, coppersmithing, electrical work, foundry work, pipe work, plating, sheet-metal work, welding, and repairs of optical and mechanical equipment. Her machinery shop's equipment included lathes, radial drills, milling machines, slotting machines, boring machines, optical repair equipment, armature bake ovens, and coil winding machines. To meet additional demands from the fleet, she had a motion picture shop, large laundry and bakery facilities, a dentist office, and large refrigeration units. She also embarked two officers and 20 enlisted men from aviation Observation Squadron 2 (VO-2) to repair floatplanes based on battleships and cruisers.

== Operational history ==
Medusa spent her naval career with the United States Pacific Fleet. Upon commissioning in 1924, she was home-ported at San Pedro Submarine Base, San Pedro, California and assigned to Train Squadron 2, Base Force, after commissioning. She performed her duties out of San Pedro until World War II.

Medusa first demonstrated her capability to keep up with and support the fleet in 1925. She departed Honolulu, Hawaii, on 1 July 1925 with the battle fleet and accompanied it on a voyage across the Pacific Ocean to Australia and New Zealand and then back to San Pedro, where she arrived with the fleet on 26 September 1925.

In the late 1920s, Medusa stepped outside her normal repair duties to play a transport role. On 11 May 1927 she departed San Pedro carrying seven officers and 78 enlisted men of the U.S. Marine Corps's Marine Observation Squadron 4 and their six Boeing O2B-1 aircraft to Nicaragua. In July 1928, she again carried Marines to Nicaragua, this time in company with storeship Bridge.

Medusa continued her fleet support duties out of San Pedro until mid-August 1941, when she moved to Pearl Harbor, Hawaii. She was there on 7 December 1941 when Imperial Japanese Navy carrier aircraft attacked. With her commanding officer ashore, her repair officer, Lieutenant Commander John F. P. Miller, took command. Medusa fired on a Japanese Type A midget submarine she sighted in the harbor, ceasing fire on it when destroyer Monaghan closed in to sink the submarine. Medusa's antiaircraft machine gunners claimed two Japanese Aichi D3A1 dive bombers shot down during the attack. After the attack, she went to work in her primary role as a repair ship; she provided pumps to the damaged seaplane tender Curtiss, machine gun ammunition to the grounded battleship Nevada, and rifles to U.S. Army troops at Schofield Barracks, and food, beverages, and fuel to ships' boats that visited her, and she assisted in efforts to rescue men trapped in the hull of the capsized antiaircraft training ship Utah.

On 1 March 1942, the Base Force was redesignated the Service Force, Pacific Fleet. Now a Service Force unit, Medusa continued to aid the clean-up at Pearl Harbor.

On 4 April 1943, Medusa got underway for the combat area. She arrived at Havannah Harbor at Efate in the New Hebrides on 20 April 1943, relieving repair ship Rigel there on 24 April 1943. She operated at Efate for the next 11 months, temporarily deploying to Espiritu Santo from 24 July 1943 to 4 August 1943 to fashion a temporary bow for the torpedoed light cruiser Honolulu.

On 27 March 1944, Medusa departed Efate for a series of shorter assignments. First sailing to New Guinea, she repaired ships of the 7th Fleet at Milne Bay and Buna Roads; she then steamed to Guadalcanal, where she arrived on 15 May 1944 for service with the 3rd Fleet. On 1 June 1944, she steamed to Sydney, Australia, for repairs to her hull, damaged by grounding on Buna Shoal in May, before continuing on to Manus Island in the Admiralty Islands. After the ammunition ship Mount Hood disintegrated in a massive explosion at Manus on 10 November 1944, she provided repairs and medical supplies to internal combustion engine repair ship Mindanao, which had suffered heavy damage in the explosion.

In mid-January 1945, Medusa departed Manus for Hollandia where she joined a convoy for San Pedro Bay in the Philippine Islands. There she serviced ships engaged in the capture of Luzon and other Japanese-held islands in the Philippines and the Ryukyus until 6 July 1945, when she returned to Manus.

Pacific hostilities ended on 15 August 1945. At the end of August, Medusa steamed to Manila. There she operated with Service Squadron 7 until heading back to the United States on 14 November 1945. On 8 December 1945 she reported to Terminal Island for duty in connection with the laying up of vessels in the San Diego Group of the Inactive Fleet.

With that duty completed, she herself began inactivation. On 23 May 1946, she was reported to be "worn beyond economic repair;" in June 1946 it was recommended that she be stricken from the Naval Vessel Register and disposed of. An initial attempt to tow her from San Diego by submarine rescue vessel Cable failed, but submarine rescue vessel Curb succeeded in towing Medusa to Bremerton, where she arrived on 2 October 1946. She was decommissioned there on 18 November 1946, then was turned over to the United States Maritime Commission for ultimate disposal. The ship's flag was given to the last person off the ship, Lieutenant Commander Willard E. Adams, who had also been stationed on Medusa during the attack at Pearl Harbor.

Medusa was stricken from the Navy List on 10 June 1947. After she was stripped, her hulk was sold to Zidell Shipwrecking Company of Portland, Oregon, on 24 August 1950. Scrapping was completed in 1951.

== Battle honors ==
- Asiatic-Pacific Campaign Medal with three battle stars
- World War II Victory Medal

Medusa received one battle star for World War II service for the attack on Pearl Harbor on 7 December 1941.
