= USS Samar (ARG-11) =

1944 Luzon-class repair ship

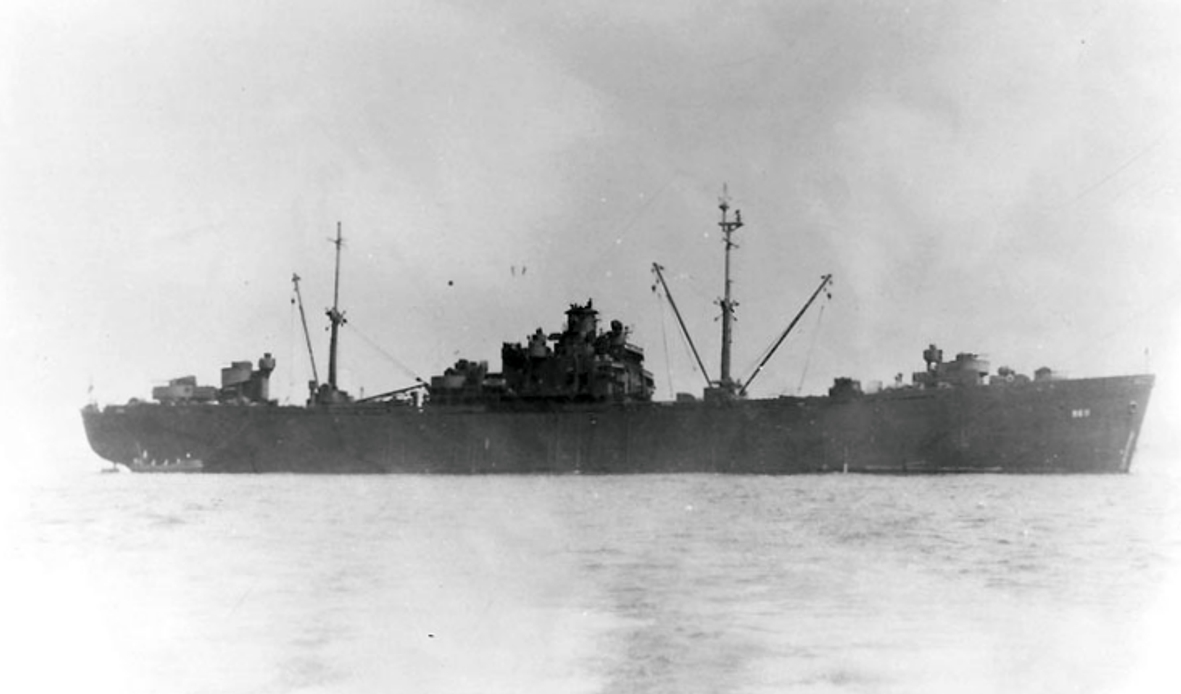
- USS Samar (ARG-11) at anchor, circa 1945, location unknown.

History

United States
- Name: Samar
- Namesake: Samar Island
- Builder: Bethlehem Shipbuilding Corporation
- Laid down: 21 September 1944
- Launched: 19 October 1944
- Sponsored by: Mrs. Elsie M. Alexander
- Acquired: 31 October 1944
- Commissioned: 5 June 1945
- Decommissioned: 24 July 1947
- Stricken: 1 September 1962
- Fate: Sold, 10 December 1973, to Zidell Explorations Corporation, physically delivered for scrapping, 25 January 1974

General characteristics
- Class & type: Luzon
- Type: Internal combustion engine repair ship
- Displacement: 4,023 long tons (4,088 t)
- Length: 441 ft 6 in (134.57 m)
- Beam: 56 ft 11 in (17.35 m)
- Draft: 23 ft 0 in (7.01 m)
- Propulsion: Triple Expansion Machinery, Single Propeller, 2,500 hp (1,864 kW)
- Speed: 12.5 knots (23.2 km/h; 14.4 mph)
- Complement: 583
- Armament: 1 x single 5 in (130 mm) dual purpose gun mount, 1 x 3 in (76 mm) gun mount, 2 x twin 40 mm AA gun mounts, 12 x single 20 mm AA gun mounts

USS Samar (ARG-11) was a Luzon class internal combustion engine repair ship that saw service in the United States Navy during the final days of World War II, and in the post-war period. Named for the Samar Island in the Philippines, it was the second U.S. Naval vessel to bear the name.

== Construction and final days of World War II ==
Samar was laid down on 21 September 1944 by Bethlehem-Fairfield, Sparrow's Point, MD, under a Maritime Commission contract (MC hull 2683); launched on 19 October 1944, sponsored by Mrs. Elsie M. Alexander, delivered to the Navy on 31 October 1944, converted to an internal combustion engine repair ship (ARG) by the Bethlehem Steel Co., Key Highway Plant, Baltimore, MD and commissioned on 5 June 1945.

Following shakedown, Samar sailed for the Panama Canal Zone, arriving at Coco Solo on 28 July. She transited the canal on the 29th and, while en route to Hawaii, received word of the Surrender of Japan. At Pearl Harbor on 16 August, the crew serviced ship for four days while awaiting orders. Underway 21 August, the repair ship sailed to Okinawa via Eniwetok and Saipan, arriving in Hagushi Bay on 22 September. Reporting for duty to Commander Service Division 101 and Task Unit (TU) 70.2.3, she proceeded to China six days later, stood up the Yangtze River on the 28th and moored to buoys in the Hwangpu River off Shanghai on 1 October. Within hours of her arrival, she had six small craft alongside for engine repairs. Samar remained at Shanghai for five months, racing against time as demobilization of sailors stripped her crew of trained repair technicians. At one point, 26 ships and boats were simultaneously assigned to Samar for repairs.

== Fate ==
Assigned to Task Unit 70.2.2 (the North China Service Unit), Samar continued the grinding work of repair services on the China station until 5 May, when the repair ship got underway to return to the United States. Arriving at San Pedro on 27 May Samar later shifted to San Diego and decommissioned there on 24 July 1947. Berthed with the Pacific Reserve Fleet, she remained there until struck from the Navy list and officially transferred to the Maritime Administration's National Defense Reserve Fleet at Suisun Bay, CA, on 1 September 1962. Samar remained laid up in the Suisun Bay Reserve Fleet until her sale and delivery to Zidell Explorations Corporation for scrapping on 25 January 1974.
