= USS Culebra Island =

1943 U.S. Navy repair ship

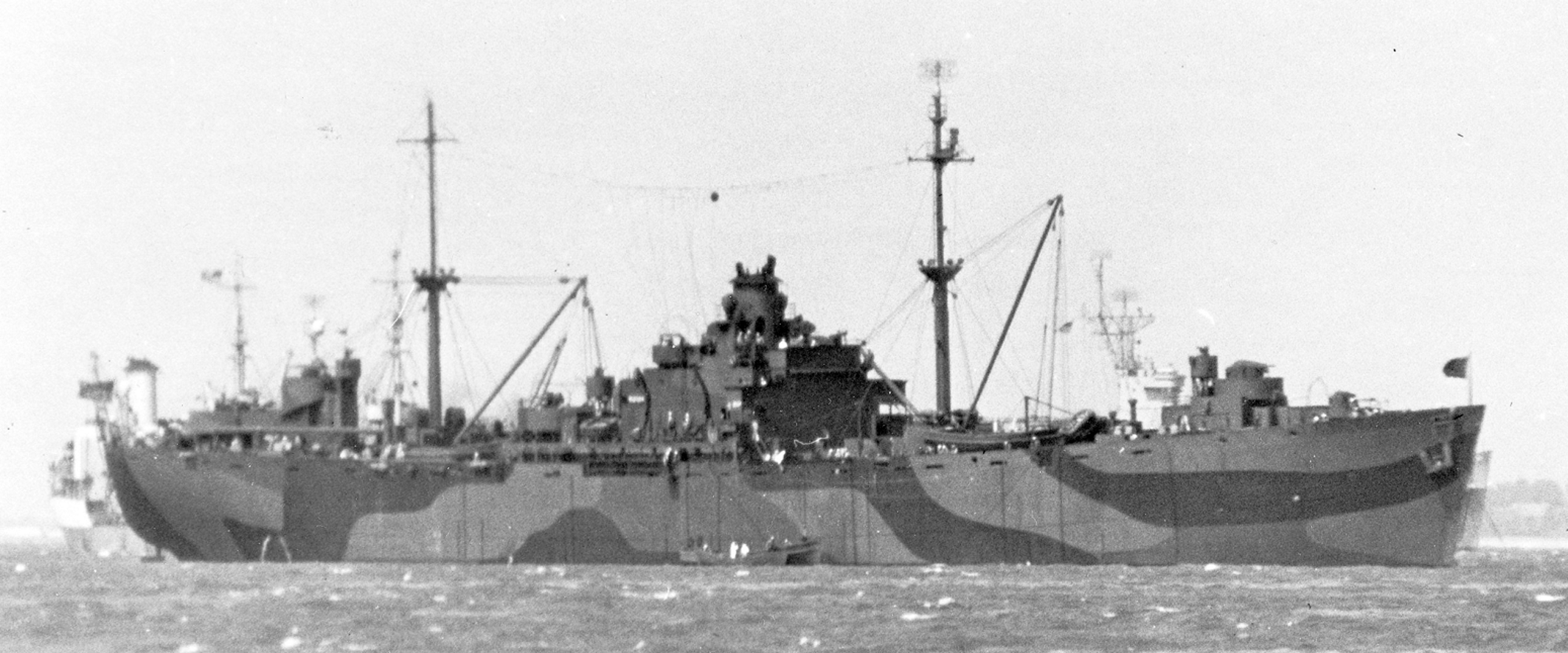
- USS Culebra Island (ARG-7) on 11 June 1944

History

United States
- Name: USS Culebra Island (ARG-7)
- Namesake: Culebra, Puerto Rico
- Ordered: As liberty ship SS John F. Goucher
- Builder: Bethlehem Fairfield Shipyard
- Laid down: 29 October 1943
- Launched: 23 November 1943
- Acquired: 29 November 1943
- Commissioned: 19 May 1944
- Decommissioned: 15 January 1947
- Fate: Scrapped 1974

General characteristics
- Class & type: Luzon-class repair ship
- Displacement: 4,023 tons
- Length: 441 ft 6 in (134.57 m)
- Beam: 56 ft 11 in (17.35 m)
- Draft: 23 ft (7.0 m)
- Speed: 12 knots
- Complement: 647
- Armament: 1 x 5 in (130 mm), 3 x 3 in (76 mm)

USS Culebra Island (ARG-7) was a Luzon-class internal combustion engine repair ship in the service of the United States Navy from 1944 to 1947. She was scrapped in 1974.

== History ==
Culebra Island was laid down 29 October 1943 as liberty ship SS John F. Goucher (MCE hull 1830) by Bethlehem Fairfield Shipyard, Baltimore, Maryland, under a Maritime Commission contract. She was launched 23 November 1943 and sponsored by Miss J. F. Miller. Culebra Island was transferred to the Navy on 29 November 1943 and commissioned 19 May 1944. She was named after Culebra, an island between Puerto Rico and the Virgin Islands, it was the only ship of the Navy to bear this name.

=== Pacific War ===
Departing Norfolk 30 June 1944 Culebra Island reached Milne Bay, New Guinea, 16 August. She joined Floating Repair Unit 1 of the 7th Fleet at Alexishafen and remained there on repair duty until arriving at Hollandia 7 October. Here she prepared ships for the Leyte operation until 25 December when she departed for San Pedro Bay, towing a drydock and escorting a tug convoy. From 6 January to 21 February 1945 she repaired and tended ships in San Pedro Bay, then sailed to Mindoro to ready LSMs for the forthcoming invasions in the southern Philippines. On 14 April she sailed for Morotai to serve ships bound for the Borneo operation and repaired those damaged there until 24 July when she returned to Leyte.

=== Decommissioning and fate ===
Culebra Island remained in the Philippines on repair duty until 1 December 1945 when she sailed for San Diego, California. Arriving 9 January 1946 she served at the US Naval Repair Base until placed in commission in reserve 30 November 1946. Culebra Island was placed out of commission in reserve 15 January 1947. She was scrapped in 1974.
