= USS Leyte (ARG-8) =

Repair ship of the United States' Navy

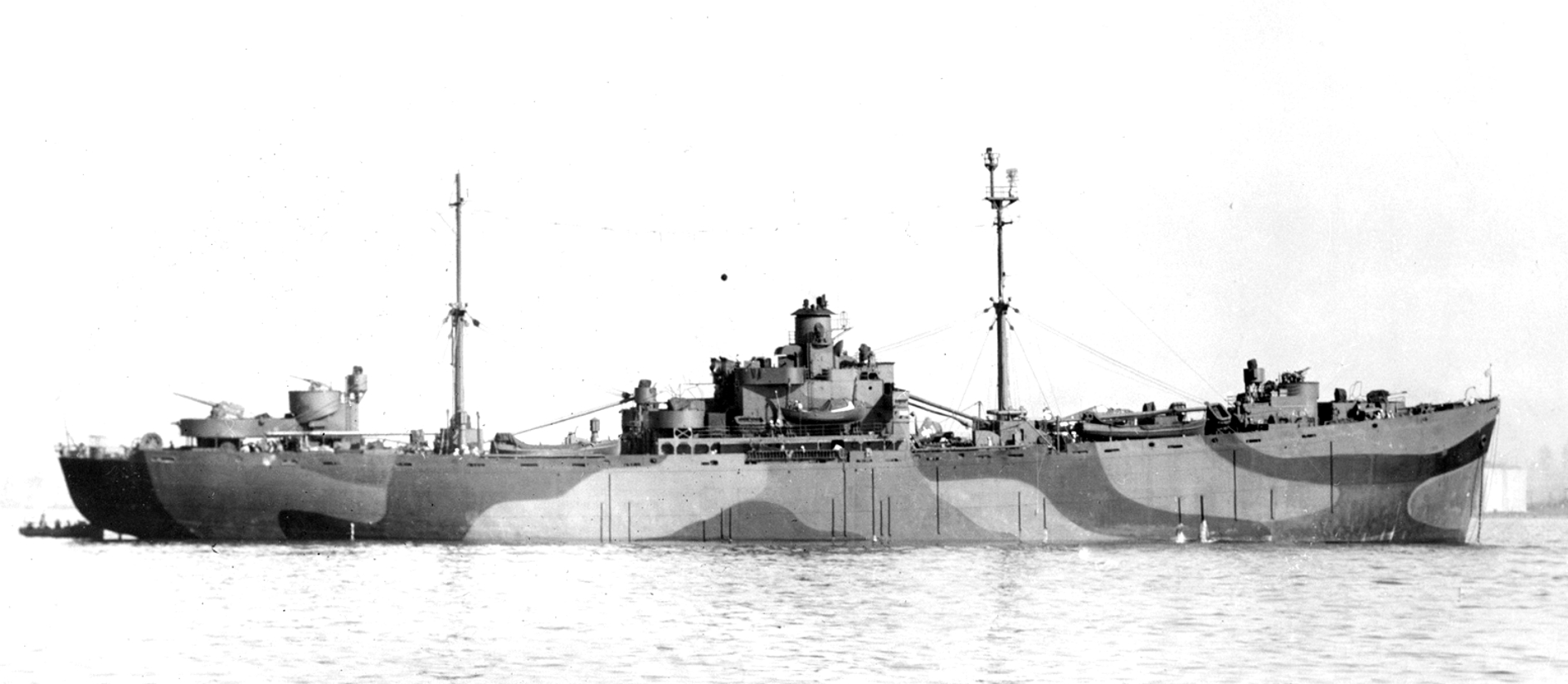
- USS Leyte (ARG-8) on 26 August 1944

History

United States
- Name: USS Leyte
- Namesake: Leyte, an island in the Philippines
- Builder: Bethlehem-Fairfield Shipyard, Inc., Baltimore, Maryland
- Laid down: 20 January 1944
- Launched: 18 February 1944
- Commissioned: 17 August 1944
- Decommissioned: 30 August 1946
- Renamed: USS Maui (ARG-8), 31 May 1945
- Stricken: April 1967
- Fate: Scrapped, 1972

General characteristics
- Type: Repair ship
- Displacement: 5,159 long tons (5,242 t) light; 8,700 long tons (8,840 t) full
- Length: 442 ft (135 m)
- Beam: 57 ft (17 m)
- Draft: 23 ft (7.0 m)
- Propulsion: Reciprocating steam engine, single shaft
- Speed: 13 knots (24 km/h; 15 mph)
- Complement: 574 officers and enlisted
- Armament: 1 × 5"/38 caliber gun; 2 × 3"/50 caliber guns; 4 × 40 mm guns

USS Leyte (ARG-8), later USS Maui (ARG-8), was a Luzon-class internal combustion engine repair ship that saw service in the United States Navy from 1944 to 1946. She was scrapped in 1972.

== History ==
Leyte was laid down on 20 January 1944 at the Bethlehem-Fairfield Shipyard, Inc. in Baltimore, Maryland; launched on 18 February 1944; sponsored by Miss Rhoda J. Braun; and commissioned on 17 August 1944. She was named after Leyte Island in the Philippines, she was the second U.S. Naval vessel to bear the name Leyte.

=== Pacific War ===
After training in Chesapeake Bay, Leyte sailed from Norfolk, Virginia, on 3 October 1944 for Pacific duty. She reported to Commander Service Force 7th Fleet on 26 November at Hollandia, New Guinea. Here she became a repair ship for LSMs, and continued this service until she departed for the Philippine Islands on 25 February 1945.

For the remainder of the War, Leyte served in Subic Bay. Her name was changed to USS Maui (ARG-8) on 31 May (after the Island of Maui, making her the second U.S. Naval vessel to bear that name) so that the name Leyte could be assigned to a new aircraft carrier then under construction, designated USS Leyte (CV-32). The ship departed Subic Bay in early December and arrived on the west coast with 1,108 returning war veterans before Christmas 1945.

=== Decommissioning and fate ===
She became inactive in March 1946 and decommissioned at San Diego, California on 30 August where she was assigned to the San Diego Group of the Pacific Reserve Fleet. In June 1961 Maui was transferred to the National Defense Reserve Fleet at Suisun Bay in Benicia, California. The ship was struck from the Naval Vessel Register in September 1962, at which time custody was transferred to MARAD. Reacquired by the Navy briefly in February–April 1967, after which Maui was again struck from the Naval Register and returned to MARAD, where she remained until 1972 at which time she was scrapped.
