= Operation Hirondelle =

- Part of the First Indochina War
- Lạng Sơn Province within which lies Lạng Sơn
Date	July 17–19, 1953
Location	French Indochina
Result	French Union victory: Successful French raid; Viet Minh caches destroyed; French withdrawal
Territorial changes	Lạng Sơn

Belligerents
French Union: France; French Indochina; State of Vietnam	Democratic Republic of Vietnam: (North Vietnam) Việt Minh

Commanders and leaders
Marcel Bigeard	

Strength
~2,000	

Operation Hirondelle took place during the First Indochina War in July 1953. It was an airborne raid on Viet Minh supply depots near Lạng Sơn, involving parachute units of the French Army and Vietnamese National Army. Raids near the junction of Route Coloniale 4 and Route Coloniale 1 revealed supply caches hidden in caves, which were photographed and destroyed.

The attack forces then retreated over land through Loc Binh, where other French units had been dropped on July 17 to repair and hold a river crossing for the retreating units; and then to form a rearguard for 20 miles. The entire force rendezvoused with Groupe Mobile Five, and was then extracted by sea on July 19, suffering from heat exhaustion. The average weight loss was 11 pounds.
