= USS Proserpine =

1944 Achelous-class repair ship

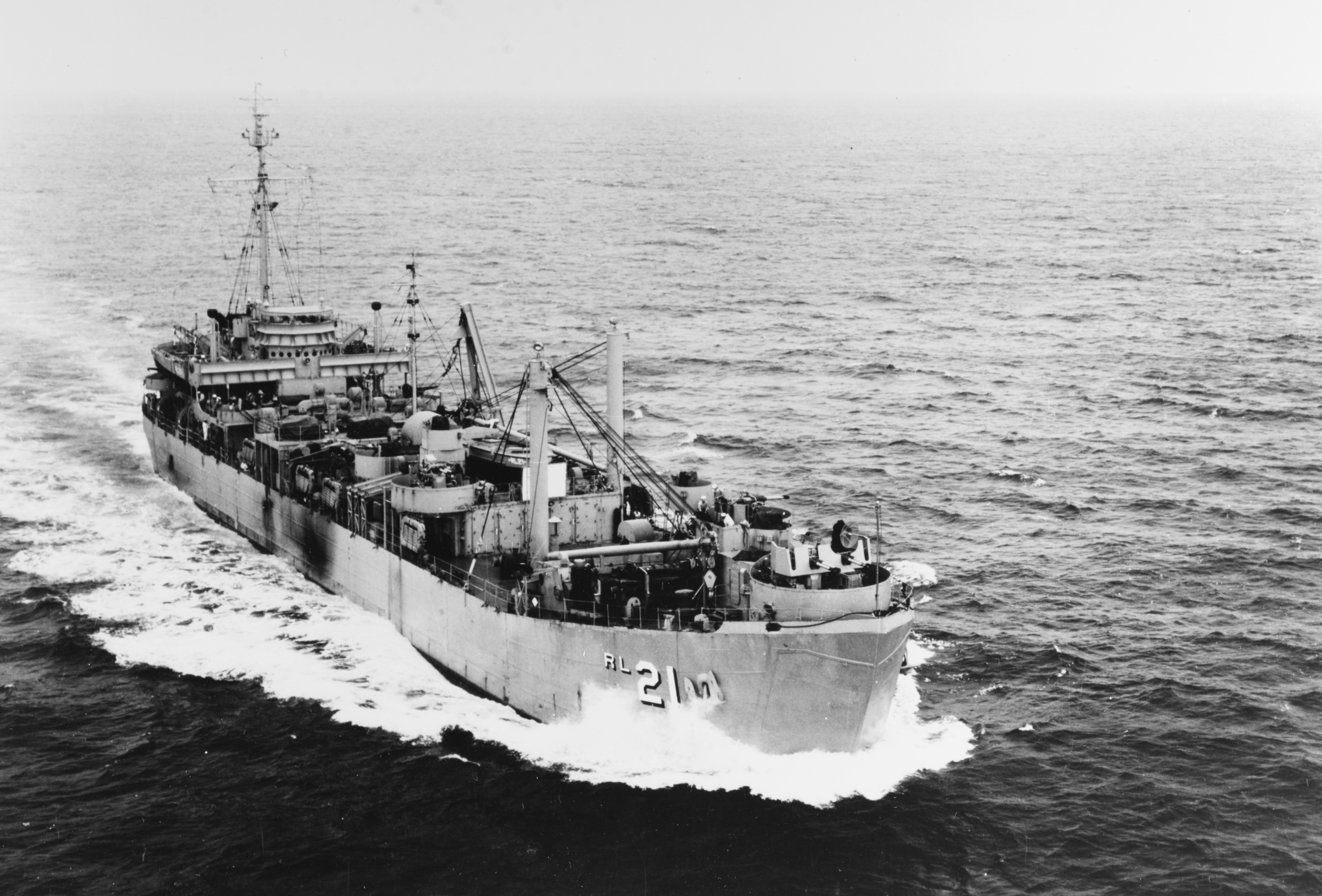
- Proserpine in August 1954

History

United States
- Name: USS Proserpine
- Builder: Chicago Bridge & Iron Company
- Laid down: 2 October 1944
- Launched: 28 December 1944
- Commissioned: 31 May 1945
- Decommissioned: 18 January 1947
- Recommissioned: 27 October 1950
- Decommissioned: 24 May 1956
- Fate: Sold, 26 September 1960

General characteristics
- Class & type: Achelous class repair ship
- Displacement: 2,220 long tons (2,256 t) light; 4,100 long tons (4,166 t) full
- Length: 328 ft (100 m)
- Beam: 50 ft (15 m)
- Draft: 11 ft 2 in (3.40 m)
- Propulsion: 2 × General Motors 12-567 diesel engines, two shafts, twin rudders
- Speed: 12 knots (14 mph; 22 km/h)
- Complement: 253 officers and enlisted men
- Armament: 2 × quad 40 mm guns (with Mark 51 director); 2 × twin 40 mm guns (with Mark 51 director); 6 × twin 20 mm guns

USS Proserpine (ARL-21) was one of 39 Achelous-class landing craft repair ships built for the United States Navy during World War II. Named for Proserpine (a Latinized form of Persephone, from Greek mythology; the daughter of Zeus and Demeter, abducted by Hades (Pluto) and made his wife), she was the only U.S. Naval vessel to bear the name.

Originally laid down as LST–1116 by the Chicago Bridge and Iron Company 2 October 1944; launched 28 December 1944; and commissioned 9 January 1945. After drydocking in Mobile, Alabama LST–1116 commenced shakedown in St. Andrews Bay, Florida 31 January 1945. She then decommissioned 15 February at Gibbs Gas Engine Company of Jacksonville, Florida underwent conversion, and recommissioned as USS Proserpine (ARL–21), a landing craft repair ship, 31 May 1945.

== Service history ==
=== 1st commission ===
Assigned to Commander, Amphibious Force, Atlantic for shakedown, Proserpine operated out of Hampton Roads, Virginia from 14 June through 6 July. Thereafter passing via the Windward Passage and the Panama Canal, she called at San Diego, California 4 August. Three weeks later she was at Pearl Harbor. From there she moved on to provide mobile repair services at Eniwetok through 16 September, at Guam through 6 October, and at Leyte in the Philippine Islands through 1 April 1946.

By the end of April, 1946 Proserpine stood out of Pearl Harbor and proceed via the Panama Canal, Houston, and New Orleans for Mayport, Florida, arriving there 1 May. She decommissioned and was placed in reserve at Green Cove Springs, Florida 18 January 1947.

=== 2nd commission ===
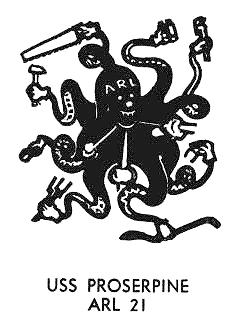
From All Hands Magazine, May 1953.

Reactivation of Proserpine commenced 19 September 1950, and she recommissioned 27 October 1950. She entered drydock at Merrill-Stevens Shipyard, Jacksonville on 21 November, after which she commenced refresher training in Chesapeake Bay. Proserpine returned to Little Creek, Virginia and commenced repair activities 1 April 1951. Through 1955 she operated at the Amphibious Base, Little Creek, with regular training cruises into the Virginia Capes Operating Areas, and periodic short deployments to the Caribbean.

Placed in reserve at Little Creek 15 February 1956, she decommissioned 24 May and remained in reserve until sold 26 September 1960 to the Interamerican Standard Company of New York City. Her final fate is unknown.
