= USS Remus =

World War II landing craft repair ship

History

United States
- Name: LST-453; Remus
- Namesake: Remus
- Ordered: as a Type S3-M-K2 hull, MCE hull 973
- Builder: Kaiser Shipbuilding Company, Vancouver, Washington
- Yard number: 157
- Laid down: 28 July 1942
- Launched: 10 October 1942
- Commissioned: 21 January 1943
- Decommissioned: 15 July 1946
- Renamed: Remus, 15 August 1944
- Reclassified: ARL-40, 15 August 1944
- Refit: converted to Landing Craft Repair Ship, May 1943
- Stricken: 15 August 1946
- Identification: Hull symbol: LST-453; Hull symbol: ARL-40; Code letters: NFGA
- Honors and awards: 2 × battle stars
- Fate: Transferred to the Atlantic Reserve Fleet, 14 December 1946

United States
- Operator: MARAD
- Fate: Sold for scrapping, 16 December 1947

General characteristics
- Class & type: LST-1-class tank landing ship; Achelous-class repair ship
- Displacement: LST: 1,625 long tons (1,651 t) (light); 4,080 long tons (4,145 t) (full (seagoing draft with 1,675 short tons (1,520 t) load); 2,366 long tons (2,404 t) (beaching); ARL: 3,900 long tons (4,000 t) light; 4,100 long tons (4,200 t) full
- Length: 328 ft (100 m) oa
- Beam: 50 ft (15 m)
- Draft: LST: Unloaded: 2 ft 4 in (0.71 m) forward; 7 ft 6 in (2.29 m) aft; Full load: 8 ft 2 in (2.49 m) forward; 14 ft 1 in (4.29 m) aft; Landing with 500 short tons (450 t) load: 3 ft 11 in (1.19 m) forward; 9 ft 10 in (3.00 m) aft; ARL: 11 ft 2 in (3.40 m)
- Installed power: 2 × 900 hp (670 kW) Electro-Motive Diesel 12-567A diesel engines; 1,700 shp (1,300 kW)
- Propulsion: 1 × Falk main reduction gears; 2 × Propellers
- Speed: 11.6 kn (21.5 km/h; 13.3 mph)
- Troops: LST: 16 officers, 147 enlisted men
- Complement: LST: 13 officers 147 enlisted; ARL: 22 officers 233 enlisted
- Armament: LST: Varied, ultimate armament; 2 × twin 40 mm (1.57 in) Bofors guns; 4 × single 40mm Bofors guns; 12 × 20 mm (0.79 in) Oerlikon cannons; ARL: 1 × 3 in (76 mm)/50 caliber dual-purpose (DP) gun; 2 × quad 40 mm Bofors guns; 6 × twin 20 mm Oerlikon cannons

USS LST-453 was a United States Navy LST-1-class tank landing ship used in the Asiatic-Pacific Theater during World War II. She was converted at Brisbane, Australia, into an Achelous-class repair ship, shortly after commissioning, and used in the repairing of landing craft. She was later renamed for Remus (along with Romulus, one of the legendary twin sons of Mars and the Vestal Rhea Silvia), she was the only US Naval vessel to bear the name.

== Construction ==
LST-453 was laid down on 28 July 1942, under Maritime Commission (MARCOM) contract, MC hull 973, by Kaiser Shipyards, Vancouver, Washington; launched on 10 October 1942; sponsored by Mrs. Edward M. Argersinger; and commissioned on 21 January 1943.

== Service history ==
=== Conversion to repair ship ===
Following shakedown off the West Coast, LST-453 sailed west 2 March 1943, for Brisbane, via Pearl Harbor and Nouméa. Arriving at Brisbane 8 May, she was converted to a repair ship and tender for amphibious craft. She departed Brisbane for Milne Bay, 6 June 1943, arriving on 17 June, as one of the first amphibious craft in New Guinea. Three days later she proceeded to Goodenough Island, where she tended and repaired LCTs and other small craft through the summer. On 13 September, she was ordered to Buna, where she added duties as flagship, Landing Craft Control Officer, to her activities. While at Buna, LST-453 was the only source of supply for ships operating in the forward area and was required to tend up to 70 ships per month.

On 15 December, LST-453 received several near misses from medium bombers which attacked her at Hanisch Harbor. She shifted to Cape Cretin, where there were also frequent air raids. In January 1944, the ship was assigned a 400-long-ton (410 t) pontoon dry dock and she continued to operate from one to two dry docks throughout the remainder of her tour in the southwest Pacific, towing the dry dock forward with her on every move. On 15 April, the ship was sent to the Admiralty Islands to service ships staging for the Hollandia-Aitape invasion. She returned to Cape Cretin on 24 April 1944, and continued operations in that area until 14 June 1944. She then sailed for Alexishafen where she joined several other tenders on a rigid repair program to ready ships for future operations.

=== Renaming ===
On 15 August 1944, she was redesignated as ARL-40 and named Remus. Departing from Alexishafen 15 September 1944, for Mios Woendi, Remus became the advanced based tender of the 7th Fleet Amphibious Force. On 12 January 1945, she sailed for Leyte arriving on 22 January, to operate there throughout the remainder of her foreign service. Charged with repairs to all LCTs in the area, she operated two dry docks, one 250-long-ton (250 t) pontoon dock for LCTs, and one 400-long-ton dock for LCIs and LCSs.

=== Decommissioning ===
Sailing east 17 October 1945, she transited the Panama Canal 6 December, and arrived at New Orleans eight days later to join the Atlantic Reserve Fleet. Through the spring of 1946, she prepared landing craft for the mothball fleet, then on 15 July, was herself decommissioned. Struck from the Naval Vessel Register 15 August 1946, she was sold to B. T. Jones for scrap 16 December 1947.

== Bibliography ==
- "LST-453". Dictionary of American Naval Fighting Ships. Naval History and Heritage Command. 3 August 2015. This article incorporates text from this source, which is in the public domain.
- "Remus". Dictionary of American Naval Fighting Ships. Naval History and Heritage Command. 27 August 2015. This article incorporates text from this source, which is in the public domain.
- "Kaiser Vancouver, Vancouver WA". www.ShipbuildingHistory.com. 27 November 2010.
- "USS Remus (ARL-40)". NavSource. 10 October 2014.
