= USS Luzon (ARG-2) =

US Navy vessel

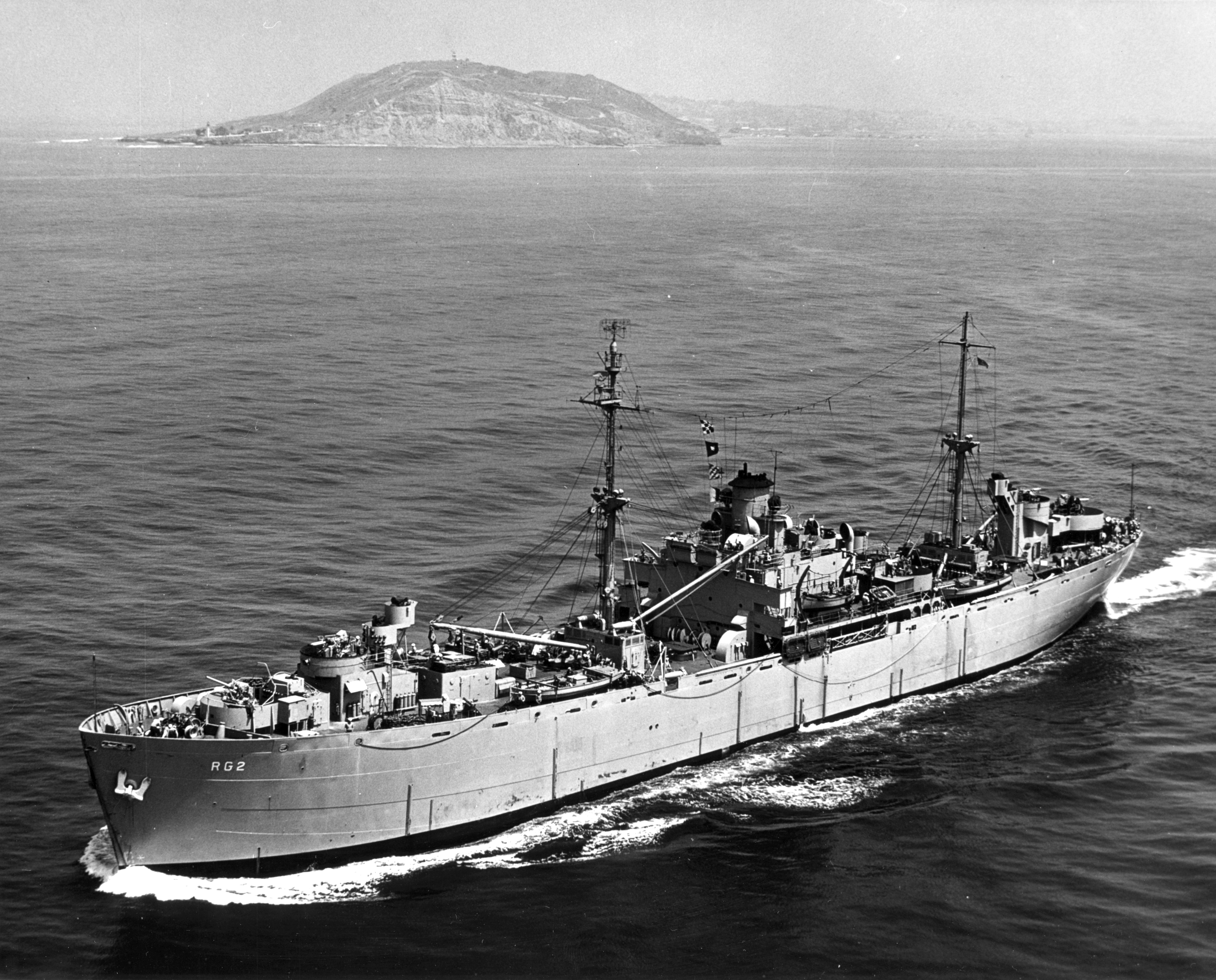
- USS Luzon (ARG-2) in the 1950s

History

United States
- Name: Samuel Bowles; Luzon
- Namesake: Samuel Bowles; Luzon
- Ordered: as a Type EC2-S-C1 hull, MCE hull 981
- Builder: Bethlehem-Fairfield Shipyard, Baltimore, Maryland
- Yard number: 2131
- Laid down: 8 April 1943
- Launched: 14 May 1943
- Acquired: 24 May 1943
- Commissioned: 12 October 1943
- Recommissioned: 20 September 1950
- Decommissioned: 25 March 1947; 3 June 1960
- Stricken: 1 September 1961
- Identification: Hull symbol: ARG-2; Code letters: NPYA
- Honors and awards: 1 × battle stars for Korean War service
- Fate: Sold for scrapping, 26 August 1974

General characteristics
- Class & type: Luzon-class Internal Combustion Engine Repair Ship
- Type: Type EC2-S-C1
- Displacement: 4,023 long tons (4,088 t) (light load); 14,350 long tons (14,580 t) (full load)
- Length: 441 ft 6 in (134.57 m)
- Beam: 56 ft 11 in (17.35 m)
- Draft: 23 ft (7.0 m)
- Installed power: 2 × Babcock & Wilcox header-type boilers, 220 psi (1,500 kPa) 450 °F (232 °C); 2,500 shp (1,900 kW)
- Propulsion: 1 × General Machine Corporation vertical triple expansion engines; 1 x propeller
- Speed: 12.5 kn (23.2 km/h; 14.4 mph) (ship's trials)
- Complement: 31 officers, 552 enlisted
- Armament: 1 × 5 in (127 mm)/38 caliber dual purpose (DP) gun; 3 × 3 in (76 mm)/50 caliber (DP) gun; 2 × twin 40 mm (1.6 in) Bofors anti-aircraft (AA) gun mounts; 12 × single 20 mm (0.8 in) Oerlikon cannons AA mounts

USS Luzon (ARG-2) was an internal combustion engine repair ship in service with the United States Navy from 1943 to 1947 and from 1950 to 1960. She was the lead ship in a class of twelve ships and was scrapped in 1974.

== Construction ==
Luzon was laid down 8 April 1943, as liberty ship SS Samuel Bowles, under a Maritime Commission (MARCOM) contract, MCE hull 981, by the Bethlehem-Fairfield Shipyard, Inc., in Baltimore, Maryland; launched 14 May 1943; sponsored by Mrs. H. E. Sigman; acquired by the Navy and renamed Luzon 24 May 1943; commissioned 12 October 1943. She was named for the island of Luzon, the chief island in the northern Philippines and site of the capital city of Manila. She was the second U.S. naval vessel to bear the name.

== Service history ==
=== World War II ===
After shakedown in Chesapeake Bay, she departed Norfolk, Virginia 28 November, for duty in the Pacific. She transited the Panama Canal 6 December, and arrived the Ellice Islands 3 January 1944. Assigned to Service Squadron 4, she operated at Funafuti and provided repair facilities for amphibious, patrol, and landing craft. Following the invasion of the Marshall Islands on 31 January, she steamed for Kwajalein Atoll on 23 February, and arrived there on 4 March. During the next 5 months, she served there as repair ship and tender for harbor craft.

As American seapower spearheaded the Allied advance across the Pacific, Luzon steamed to Guam after the conquest of the Marianas. Departing Kwajalein on 2 September, she sailed via Eniwetok and reached Apra, Guam, on 11 September. As a unit of Service Squadron 10, she maintained a busy repair schedule there until 1 March 1945, when she steamed to Saipan for 6 months of duty at that important harbor.

Following the surrender of Japan to the Allied Powers, Luzon departed the Marianas on 1 October, for Japanese waters. After touching at Iwo Jima, she reached Wakanoura Wan, Honshū on 8 October. She proceeded to Nagoya, Honshū, 19 December until 22 December, she provided fleet and repair services to ships supporting occupation operations in Japan. She then departed for the United States, and, after touching at Pearl Harbor and the Panama Canal, she arrived at Orange, Texas, on 9 February 1946. Assigned to the Atlantic Reserve Fleet, she was decommissioned on 24 June 1947.

=== Korean War ===
In response to the outbreak of the Korean War, Luzon was recommissioned on 20 September 1950. After steaming to Norfolk in early in October, she departed for the West Coast on 15 November. She reached San Diego on 6 December, proceeded to San Francisco on 11 December, and sailed for the Far East on 26 December. She arrived at Sasebo, Kyūshū on 23 January 1951, and during the remainder of the year, she provided valuable repair services for ships of the US 7th Fleet. She departed Japan for the west coast 19 January 1952; after reaching San Francisco on 9 February, she operated out of San Francisco, San Diego, Pearl Harbor, and Long Beach during the next 15 months.

Departing Long Beach on 2 May 1953, Luzon deployed to the western Pacific and arrived at Sasebo on 2 June. Except for a run to Pusan, South Korea, and back in mid-July, she provided repair facilities at Sasebo until sailing to Yokosuka on 15 January 1954. She departed the Far East for home on 2 February, and arrived at Long Beach on 28 February. She was placed in commission, in reserve on 15 March 1955, while undergoing repair at Mare Island. After returning to San Diego on 29 April, she was placed in service, in reserve.

Luzon was recommissioned at San Diego on 3 November. After completing training off southern California, she sailed for the Far East on 9 March 1956. She arrived at Sasebo on 9 April, and began duty as station repair ship for Service Squadron 3. During the next 4 years she remained in the western Pacific, supporting peacekeeping operations of the 7th Fleet. Although based at Sasebo, she steamed to Okinawa, Taiwan, Hong Kong, and to various Japanese ports while carrying out her assigned tasks. Luzon returned to San Diego on 31 May 1960, then steamed to Mare Island on 3 June, for deactivation. She was decommissioned there on 1 July 1960, and her name was struck from the Naval Register on 1 September 1961.

== Final disposition ==
Luzon was laid up in the Suisun Bay Reserve Fleet, Suisun Bay, California, on 25 August 1960, after being transferred to Maritime Administration (MARAD).

On 26 August 1974, she was sold for $555,625.50 to Seangyong Trading Company, Ltd., Seoul, South Korea, for scrapping.

== Awards ==
Luzon received one battle stars for her Korean war service.

== Bibliography ==
=== Online resources ===
- "Luzon II (ARG-2)". Dictionary of American Naval Fighting Ships. Naval History and Heritage Command. 29 July 2015. This article incorporates text from this source, which is in the public domain.
- "Bethlehem-Fairfield, Baltimore MD". ShipbuildingHistory.com. 14 August 2008.
- "USS Luzon (ARG-2)". NavSource. 21 November 2014.
- "LUZON (ARG-2)". United States Department of Transportation. Archived from the original on 11 April 2016.
- "LUZON (ARG-2)". shipscribe.com.
