= Bethlehem Key Highway Shipyard =

American shipyard company

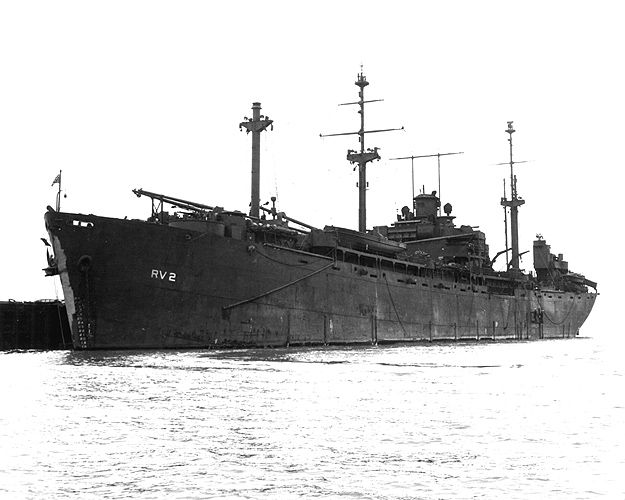
USS Webster moored pierside at Bethlehem Key Highway Shipyard in March 1945

Bethlehem Key Highway Shipyard started as William Skinner & Sons in downtown Baltimore, Maryland in 1815. In 1899 the shipyard was renamed Skinner Shipbuilding & Dry Dock Company. Also at the site was Malster & Reanie started in 1870 by William T. Malster (1843–1907). In 1879 Malster partnered with William B. Reaney (1808-1883). In 1880 Malster & Reanie was sold and renamed Columbian Iron Works & Dry Dock Company (Lower Yard). Malster & Reanie and Skinner Shipbuilding & Dry Dock Company merged in 1906, but remained as Skinner Shipbuilding. In 1914 the company was renamed Baltimore Dry Dock & Shipbuilding Company. Baltimore Dry Dock & Shipbuilding Company sold to Bethlehem Steel in 1922, becoming part of Bethlehem Shipbuilding Corporation. Bethlehem Steel operated the shipyard for ship repair, conversion and some ship construction. Bethlehem's main ship construction site was across the harbor at Bethlehem Sparrows Point. Bethlehem Key Highway Shipyard was known as the Bethlehem Upper Yard located north-east side of Federal Hill. Bethlehem Fort McHenry Shipyard located on the west side of Locust Point peninsula was known as the Lower Yard, near Fort McHenry.

== Bethlehem Key Highway Shipyard ==
Bethlehem Key Highway Shipyard, the 42-acre Upper Yard, was sold to AME/Swirnow in 1983. Swirnow shipyard sold the land in 2002 and is now Ritz Carlton and Harborview communities near to the Baltimore Museum of Industry at 39.274497°N 76.601605°W.

- Major projects:
- USS Palawan (ARG-10), converted to Luzon Class Internal Combustion Engine Repair Ship.
- USS Diamond Head (AE-19), converted to ammunition ship at the shipyard.
- USS Graffias (AF-29), a type (C2-S-E1) hull converted to Hyades stores ship at the shipyard.
  - Achelous-class repair ship, Bethlehem Key Highway Shipyard converted Landing Ship, Tank (LST) ship to Achelous-class repair ships, for the repair of landing craft, vehicle, personnel (LCVP) or Higgins boat.
- USS Menelaus (ARL-13)
- USS Numitor (ARL-17)
- USS Patroclus (ARL-19)
- USS Indra (ARL-37)
  - Some T-2 tankers were converted or "jumboized" in order to increase their capacity as oiler ship. A 354-foot-long cargo midsection was added. Sample:
- SS Gulfmeadows, Gulf Oil Company tanker converted in 1957 to 12,811 GT, from 9,900 GT. Built as SS Great Meadows in 1943 by Sun Shipbuilding Co.
- SS Maine, built as a T2-SE-A2 tanker SS Tomahawk by Marinship Corporation. Became US Navy USS Tomahawk (AO-88). In 1967 she was jumboized.
- SS Marine Duval, was USS Lynchurg (AO 154)
- Six other T-2 tankers were jumboized.
  - Legacy:

A Bethlehem Key Highway Shipyard 100 feet tall crane built in the 1940s during World War II is on display at The Baltimore Museum of Industry along with other artifacts. The crane was used at the Bethlehem Fairfield Shipyard to help build Liberty ships, Victory ships and amphibious landing ships. Fairfield closed in 1945 and the crane was moved to Bethlehem Key Highway Shipyard in 1945.

== Bethlehem Fort McHenry Shipyard ==
Bethlehem Fort McHenry Shipyard, the Lower Yard, was sold to General Ship Repair in 1983. The site is now some of Port of Baltimore terminals at 39.268133°N 76.582872°W. (former Columbian Iron Works & Dry Dock Company 1899-1906)

- Major projects
- USS Avenge (AM-423)
- USS Webster (ARV-2)
  - Built drilling rigs in the 1970s. Sample:
- Ocean Scout, was the first semisubmersible oil well drilling rig to be constructed on the East Coast.

== Baltimore Shipbuilding & Dry Dock Company ==
Columbian Iron Works and Dry Dock Company (1899—1906) went into receivership in 1899 and was reorganized as Baltimore Shipbuilding & Dry Dock Company, and was purchased by William B. Skinner and Sons in 1905. In 1915, Skinner and Sons went into receivership and was reorganized as the Baltimore Dry Dock and Shipbuilding Corporation.

Baltimore Shipbuilding & Dry Dock Company specialized in building and repairing tanker ships. Sample:

- SS Bethelridfe, and SS Betterton, tankers built in 1919 at 10,300 tons, 444 feet long, 59 beam, 34 tanks, 2,500 HP. Four others built.
- SS Arundel built in 1904

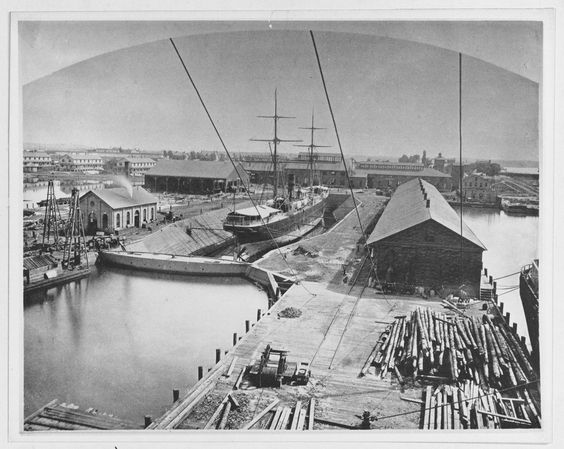
Baltimore Dock in 1880

== Skinner Shipbuilding & Dry Dock Company ==
Skinner Shipbuilding & Dry Dock Company, also called William Skinner & Sons. (1906—1915). Shipyard samples:

- Standard Oil Company No. 16 (harbor tug) built in 1907 for Standard Oil Company.
- Baltimore tugboat built in 1906, now a Museum ship.
- Spartan Tug
- RFA Steadfast built in 1915, a mooring Vessel.

== Baltimore Dry Dock & Shipbuilding Company ==
Baltimore Dry Dock & Shipbuilding Company (1915-1922), also called the Upper Plant on 9.6 acres.

Ships built:

- General de Castelnau, in 1917 renamed Elinor (ID 2465).
- South Pole (ID 3665) 1918
- War Neptune - Polar Bear (ID 3666) 1918
- Warrenton, Polar Sea (ID 3301) 1918
- War Venus, Polar Star (ID 3787)
- USS Redwing, Minesweeper No. 48, 1919
- USS Lark (AM-21)) 1921
- District of Columbia, USS Serapis (IX-213) 1921
- USS Bobolink (AM-20)
- USS Pigeon (ASR-6)
- Avocet (AVP 4)
- Aeolus (ID 3005)
- Thrush (AVP 3)

== Malster & Reanie ==
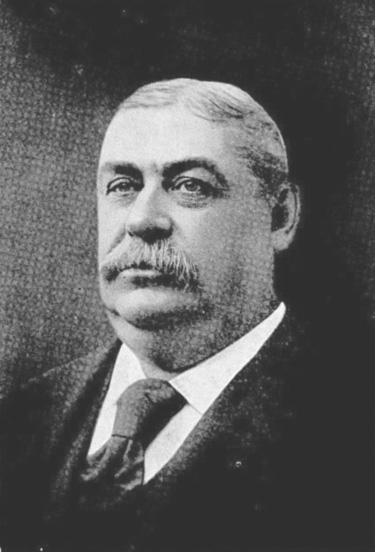
William T. Malster (1843-1907), in 1897

Malster & Reanie (1872-1880) built yachts and other ships. William T. Malster (1843-1907) was the Mayor of Baltimore from 1897 to 1899. Malster was the son of a Confederate Colonel.

William B. Reaney (1808-1883) was raised in Philadelphia with private tutors. In 1849 started working in his father, Thomas Reaney, shipyard in the engineering department, Reaney & Neafie Shipyard. Thomas Reaney and Samuel Archbold also started the Pennsylvania Iron Works. He and his father moved to city of Chester and started a new yard, Delaware River Iron Ship Building and Engine Works, commonly known as Roach's Ship Yard. Reaney, Son & Archbold built ships for the American Civil War. building the USS Wateree, USS Suwanee and USS Shamokin, USS Sagamore, USS Lehigh, and USS Tunxis purposes, including the river steamboat Samuel M. Felton. In 1872 the yards were sold to John Roach. In 1872 he entered in to a partnership with Malster. In 1874 he build a new yard in Philadelphia as owner and naval architect. In 1879 sold and became the manager of the Eureka Cast Steel Company of Chester.

Sample built: La Brerague, yacht 240 feet for Eugene Tampkins

== See also ==
- Calmar Steamship Company and other subsidiaries of the Bethlehem Steel
