= Bethlehem Shipbuilding Corporation =

1905–1997 shipbuilding company in the United States

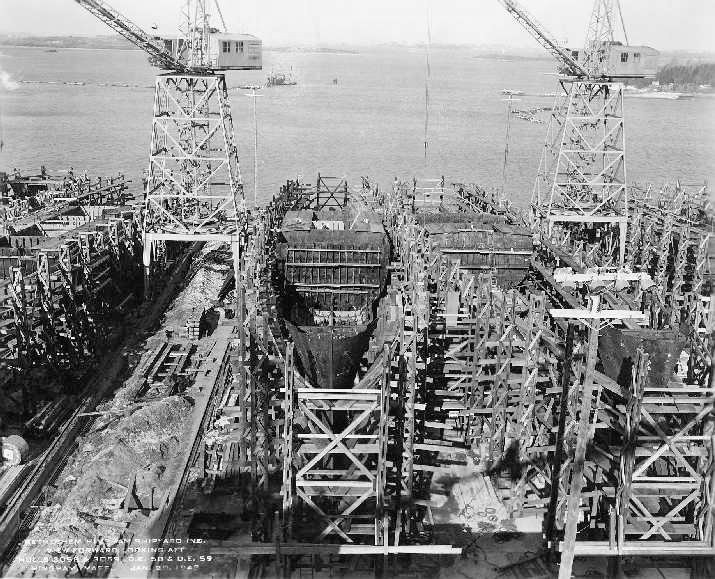
- HMS Calder (K349) under construction as USS Formoe (DE-58), with USS Foss (DE-59) on right at Bethlehem Hingham Shipyard on the Weymouth Back River in Massachusetts
- Formerly: Bethlehem Steel Corporation
- Type: Corporation
- Industry: Shipbuilding
- Founded: 1905 in Quincy, Massachusetts, U.S.
- Defunct: 1997
- Headquarters: Quincy, Massachusetts, U.S., U.S.
- Area served: United States
- Products: Ships

Bethlehem Steel Corporation Shipbuilding Division was created in 1905 when the Bethlehem Steel Corporation of Bethlehem, Pennsylvania, acquired the San Francisco-based shipyard Union Iron Works. In 1917, it was incorporated as Bethlehem Shipbuilding Corporation, Limited.

The division's headquarters were moved to Quincy, Massachusetts, after acquiring the Fore River Shipyard in 1913.

In 1940, Bethlehem Shipbuilding was the largest of the "Big Three" U.S. shipbuilders that could build any ship, followed by Newport News Shipbuilding & Drydock and New York Shipbuilding Corporation (New York Ship). Bethlehem expanded shortly before and during World War II as a result of the Long Range Shipbuilding Program and later the Emergency Shipbuilding program orchestrated by the United States Maritime Commission and the Two Ocean Navy program and its war-time successors by the military establishment.

In 1964, the now-corporate headquarters moved to Sparrows Point, Maryland, southeast of Baltimore, whose shipyard had been acquired in 1916.

The Quincy / Fore River yard was sold to General Dynamics Corporation in the mid-1960s, and closed in 1986. The Alameda Works Shipyard in California was closed by Bethlehem Steel in the early 1970s, while the San Francisco facility (former Union Iron Works) was sold to British Aerospace in the mid-1990s and survives today as BAE Systems San Francisco Ship Repair.

Bethlehem Steel ceased shipbuilding activities in 1997 in an attempt to preserve its core steelmaking operations.

The Bethlehem Shipbuilding Corporation Hospital, first built to treat injured workers, was added to the National Register of Historic Places in December 2022.

== Shipyards ==
Shipyards owned or operated by Bethlehem:

=== New York ===
- Became part of Bethlehem with the purchase of United Shipyards on June 2, 1938 for $9,320,000
  - Bethlehem Mariners Harbor, Staten Island, New York (1938–1963).
  - Bethlehem Brooklyn 56th Street, Brooklyn, New York (1938–1963).
  - Bethlehem Brooklyn 27th Street (1938–1963).
  - Hoboken Shipyard, Hoboken, New Jersey (1938–1984).
  - they were called the Staten Island Works, the Brooklyn 56th Street Works, the Brooklyn 27th Street Works and the Hoboken Works of the New York Plant of the Bethlehem Shipbuilding Corporation.
- Bethlehem Elizabethport, Elizabethport, New Jersey (1916–1921).
- Bayonne Naval Drydock, Bayonne, New Jersey. Bethlehem used this drydock for ship repairs. Most workers were from Hoboken Shipyard.

=== Boston ===
- Fore River Shipyard, Quincy, Massachusetts (1913–1963). Sold to General Dynamics Corporation.
- Victory Plant Shipyard, Quincy, Massachusetts (1917–1919). The "Victory Yard" was constructed to build destroyers and free up the Fore River Yard for other vessels including the battlecruiser-turned-aircraft carrier USS Lexington (CV-2).
- Bethlehem Hingham Shipyard, Hingham, Massachusetts (1940–1945).
- Bethlehem Atlantic Works, East Boston, Massachusetts (1853–1984).

=== Baltimore ===
- Bethlehem Sparrows Point Shipyard, Sparrows Point, Maryland (1914–1997).
- Bethlehem Fairfield Shipyard, Baltimore, (1940–1945).
- Bethlehem Key Highway Shipyard, Baltimore. The upper yard was sold to AME/Swirnow in 1983. The site now holds Ritz Carlton and Harborview communities next to Baltimore Museum of Industry.
- Bethlehem Fort McHenry Shipyard, Baltimore. The lower yard on Locust Point peninsula, it was sold to General Ship Repair in 1983. Now some Port of Baltimore terminals.

=== San Francisco ===
- Union Iron Works, San Francisco, California (1917–1981).
  - also called the Potrero Works and the Risdon Works of the Union plant of Bethlehem Steel
- Alameda Works Shipyard, Alameda, California (1916–1956).
  - also called the Alameda Works of the Union plant of Bethlehem Steel
- Hunters Point Drydocks, Hunters Point, San Francisco, California (1908–1920). Acquired by the U.S. Navy

=== Others ===
- Bethlehem Shipbuilding San Pedro on Terminal Island, formerly Southwestern Shipbuilding.
- Bethlehem Steel Wilmington (aka Harlan and Hollingsworth), Wilmington, Delaware (1904–1925, 1941–1945).
- Bethlehem Beaumont Shipyard, Beaumont, Texas (1948–1989). A major U.S. manufacturer of offshore drilling rigs, it produced 72.
- Bethlehem Sabine, Port Arthur, Texas, (1985–1995). Sold to Texas Drydock Inc. in 1995.

== See also ==
- Calmar Steamship Company and other subsidiaries of Bethlehem Steel
