= Serapis (disambiguation) =

Serapis is a Greco-Egyptian god.

Serapis may also refer to:

- HMS Serapis, various British ships
- USS Serapis, several US ships
- Serapis, a crater of Ganymede, the largest moon of planet Jupiter.
