= Mariners Harbor, Staten Island =

Neighborhood in New York City

Coordinates: 40°38′01″N 74°09′18″W

Mariners Harbor is a neighborhood located in the northwestern part of New York City's borough of Staten Island. It is bordered by Lake Avenue to the east, Forest Avenue to the south, Richmond Terrace to the north, and Holland Avenue to the west. The northwestern section of Mariners Harbor is often known as Arlington.

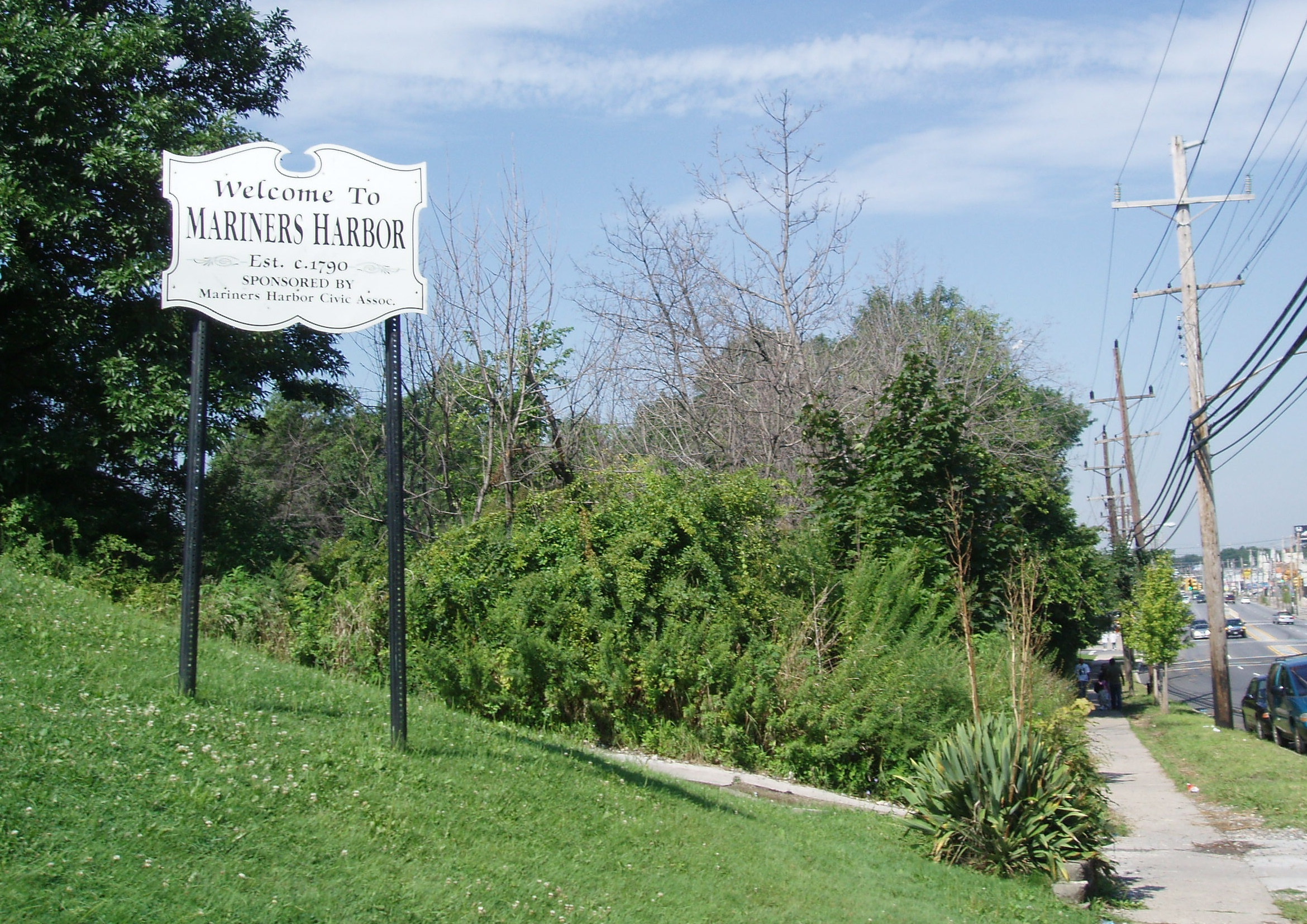
Welcome To Mariners Harbor

== History ==
The neighborhood is named for its 19th-century harvesting of oysters and other seafood products from the Kill Van Kull, which forms the neighborhood's northern border (Elm Park and Port Ivory lie to the east and west, respectively, while Graniteville is to the south). Later developments included shipbuilding, repair and marine salvage work. Fishing activity declined due to pollution during the 20th century. The Mariners Harbor Yacht Club remains as a reminder of the community's maritime past. Erastina was the first rail station built here in 1886 and named for Erastus Wiman, the promoter who helped the Baltimore & Ohio Railroad to enter New York via Staten Island. Vacant land nearby was used for staging Buffalo Bill’s “Wild West Show”, generating over 10,000 additional passengers from the St. George Ferry Terminal over the new rail line. Erastina became Mariners Harbor soon after Wiman fell from public favor due to scandal and bankruptcy. There are three other stations along the North Shore branch of the Staten Island Railway at Lake Avenue, Harbor Road, and Arlington. Passenger service on this line was discontinued on March 31, 1953. An important rail customer was Arthur Dreyer & Sons Lumber and Coal Co. near Union Avenue bridge. Remnants of the site are visible today by the coal silos. The western portion of this line was rebuilt, and is now used by freight trains traveling between New Jersey and the Howland Hook Marine Terminal in Port Ivory.

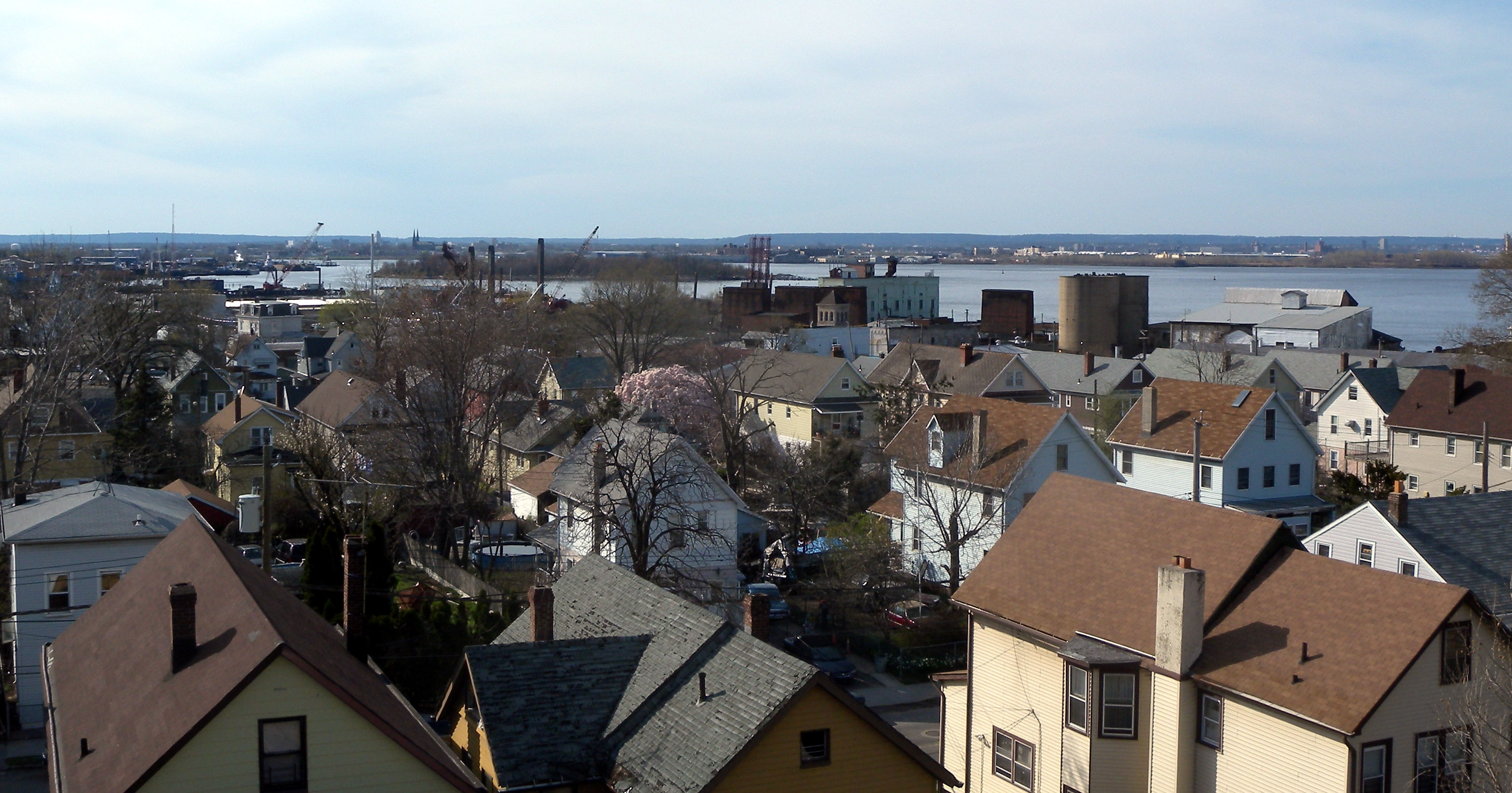
Eastern Mariners Harbor

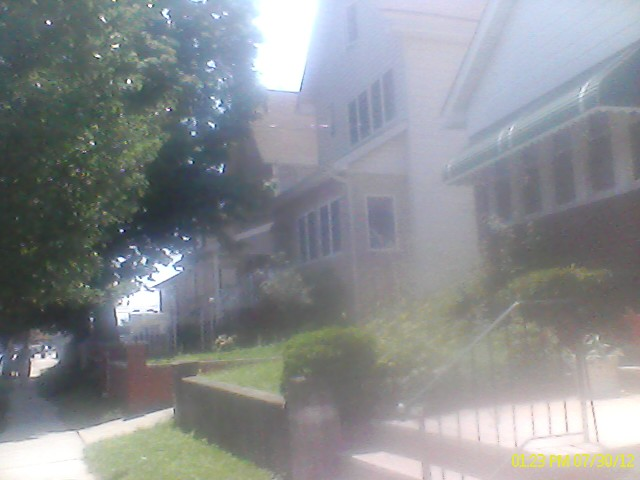
Houses along Union Avenue in Mariners Harbor

Mariners Harbor was home to large shipping and dry dock companies in the first half of the 20th century, including Bethlehem Steel, which owned a considerable portion of land in the area with headquarters along the waterfront on Richmond Terrace across from Mersereau Avenue and Brewers Dry Dock. Bethlehem Staten Island built United States Navy Destroyers during World War II. Currently, two tugboat companies—K-Sea and McAllister—operate in the area as do a number of smaller dry docks, Great Lakes Dredge and Dock, and Mariners Harbor Cargo Terminal. The John McAllister tug boat was listed on the National Register of Historic Places in 2001.

The West Shore Little League and Public School 44 also are part of the neighborhood. The former Cross Paper Plant sits on the edge of the area and now is used as rental space for other small business. In recent years a large amount of shopping has been built up in stretch of Forest Avenue from Lake Avenue to South Avenue, revitalizing the area and bringing new traffic concerns.

Mariners Harbor is home to the newest branch of the New York Public Library system. Located at 206 South Avenue, the library was opened on December 16, 2013 as the 13th branch in Staten Island, and the 88th system-wide. The building is shaped like an oyster to reflect the neighborhood's maritime history, and won the 2008 Award for Excellence in Design from New York City's Design Commission. A single-story branch library situated on a 16,000-square foot plot, it serves some 30,000 people.

The ZIP Code for Mariners Harbor is 10303.

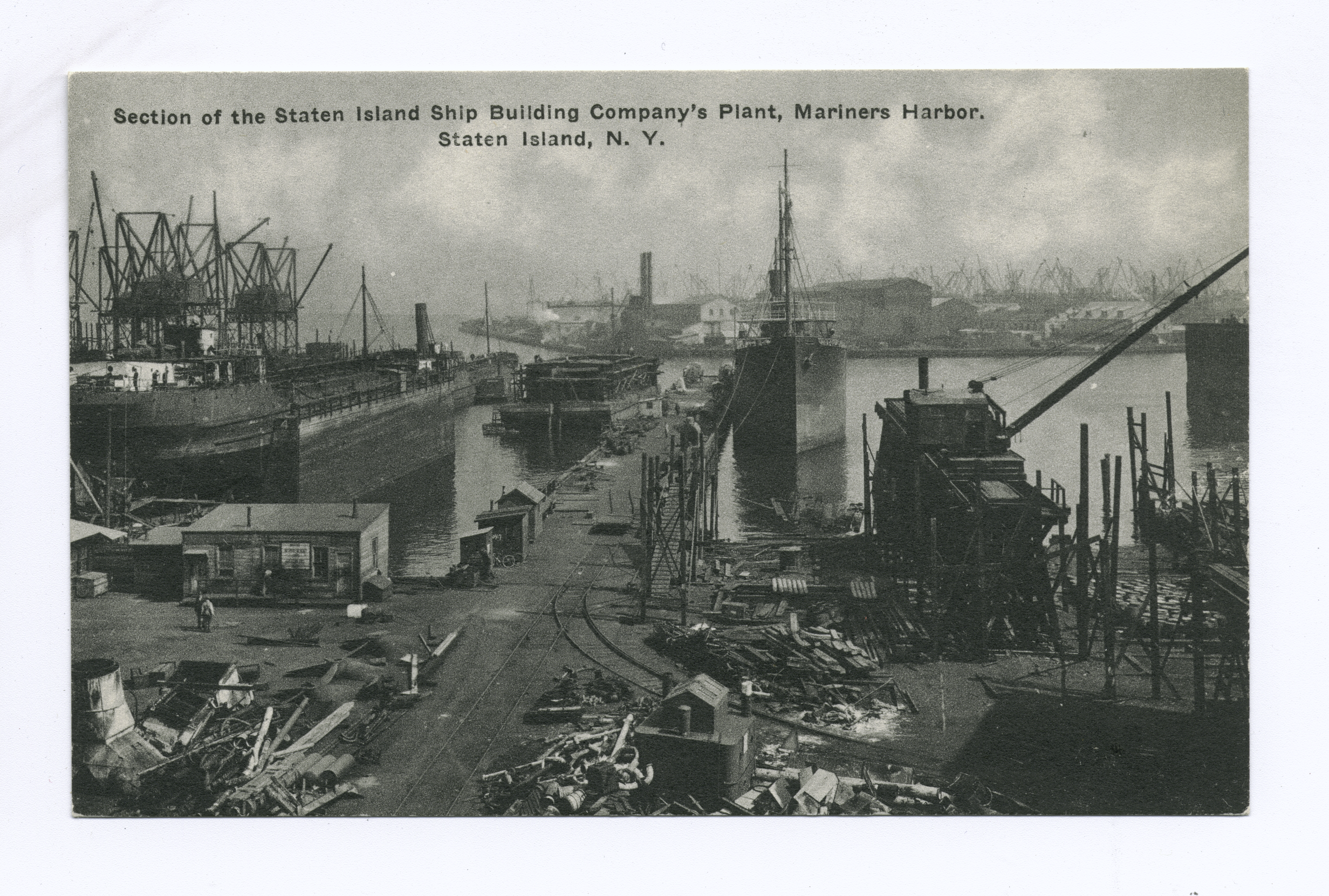
Section of the Staten Island Ship Building Company's Plant

== Demographics ==
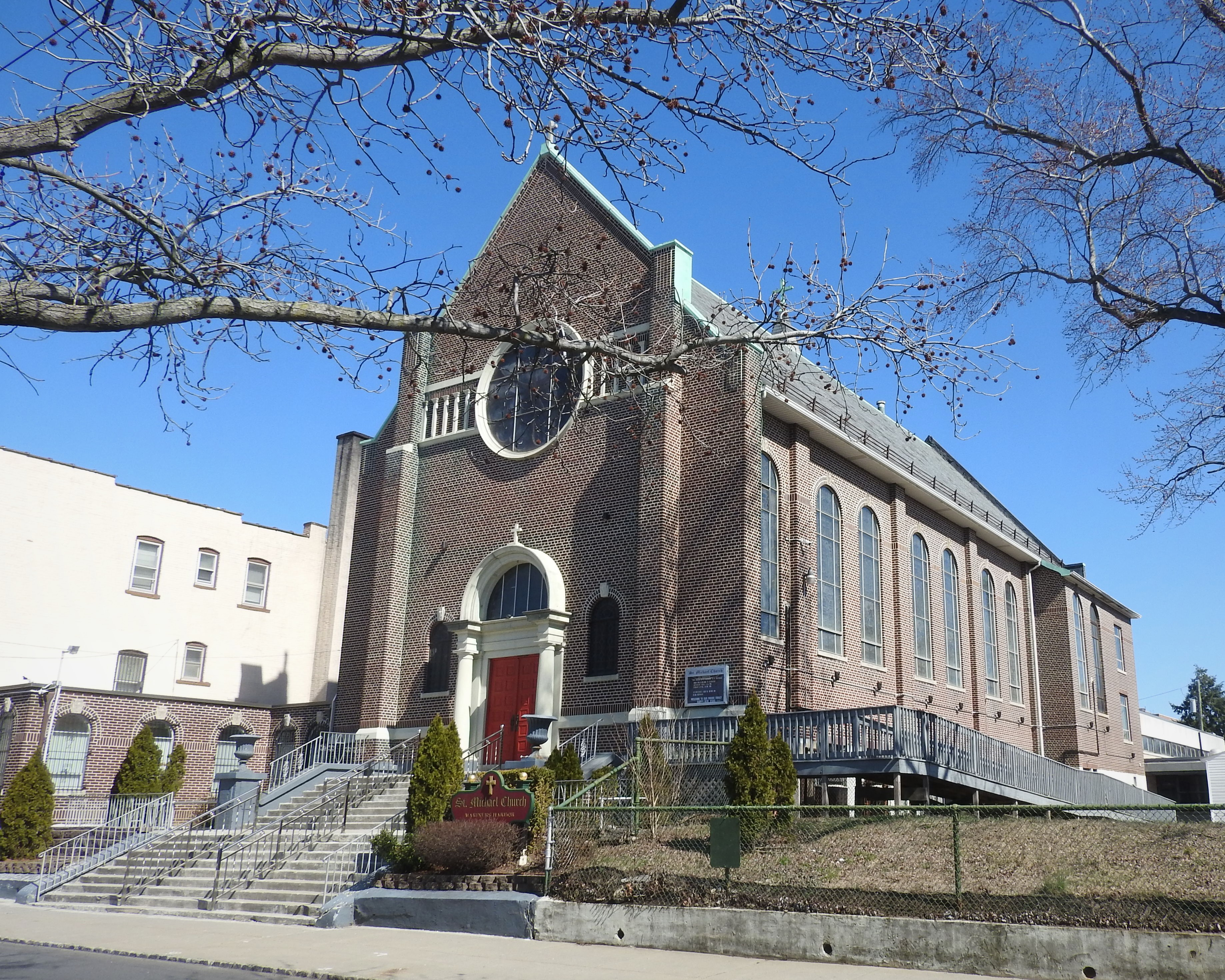
St Michael's Catholic Church

The area originally populated by the Dutch and French Huguenot settlers of 17th and 18th centuries bears the famous names of those families, which include: Van Name Avenue, Van Pelt Avenue, Brabant Street, Lockman Avenue and Mersereau Avenue. The oldest church in the neighborhood is the Summerfield Methodist Church, founded in 1840. It still stands on Harbor Road and has an active multicultural congregation, reflecting the demographics of the neighborhood. On the corner of Richmond Terrace and Lockman Avenue is the Fellowship Baptist Church, which was founded by community leader Rev. Arthur D. Phillips. The church has a large black congregation and has gained considerable political influence, being visited by New York City mayors David Dinkins, Rudolph Giuliani, and Michael Bloomberg on multiple occasions during their terms of office. Other churches in the area include the Seventh Day Adventist Church and St. Clement-St.Michael's Roman Catholic Church.

From the early 1900s to the 1930s, the area became home to many Italian-Americans, who still comprise a significant percentage of its population. The neighborhood was permanently transformed, however, in 1954, when the New York City Housing Authority opened the 605-unit Mariners Harbor Houses public housing project in the heart of the community,. The portion of the neighborhood west of Harbor Road (both north and south of the railroad tracks) eventually became predominantly Black. The area east of Harbor Road remained White longer, but has gradually become more Hispanic. All sections of the neighborhood have a substantial representation of Hispanics, Blacks, and Whites, with the southern portion of the neighborhood having a small Asian population. (Census Tract 231 has a 13% Asian population, a 442% increase from 2000, which was the fastest growth rate in the Asian population of any tract on Staten Island.)

The northwest portion of Staten Island (which includes Mariners Harbor) as well as the Far South Shore are the fastest growing areas of Staten Island.

For census purposes, the New York City Department of City Planning classifies Mariner's Harbor as part of a larger Neighborhood Tabulation Area called Mariner's Harbor-Arlington-Graniteville SI0107. This designated neighborhood had 33,492 inhabitants based on data from the 2020 United States Census. This was an increase of 2,018 persons (6.4%) from the 31,474 counted in 2010. The neighborhood had a population density of 35.2 inhabitants per acre (14,500/sq mi; 5,600/km^{2}).

The racial makeup of the neighborhood was 19.8% (6,618) White (Non-Hispanic), 29.4% (9,853) Black (Non-Hispanic), 10.9% (3,659) Asian, and 4.4% (1,452) from two or more races. Hispanic or Latino of any race were 35.6% (11,910) of the population.

According to the 2020 United States Census, this area has many cultural communities of over 1,000 inhabitants. This include residents who identify as Mexican, Puerto Rican, Dominican, Irish, Italian, Chinese, and African-American.

The largest age group was people 5-19 years old, which made up 22.2% of the residents. 74.5% of the households had at least one family present. Out of the 10,640 households, 40.9% had a married couple (18.1% with a child under 18), 5.7% had a cohabiting couple (2.9% with a child under 18), 17.9% had a single male (2.1% with a child under 18), and 35.5% had a single female (10.9% with a child under 18). 41.4% of households had children under 18. In this neighborhood, 70.2% of non-vacant housing units are renter-occupied.

== Police and crime ==
Mariners Harbor is patrolled by the 121st Precinct of the NYPD, located at 970 Richmond Ave, Staten Island, NY 10314. The 121st Precinct ranked 10th with 3.6 crimes per 1000 residents, respectively.

The 121st precinct reported 1 murder, 34 rapes, 0 robberies, 5 felony assaults, 2 burglaries, 4 grand larcenies, and 2 grand larcenies auto in 2019.

== Fire safety ==
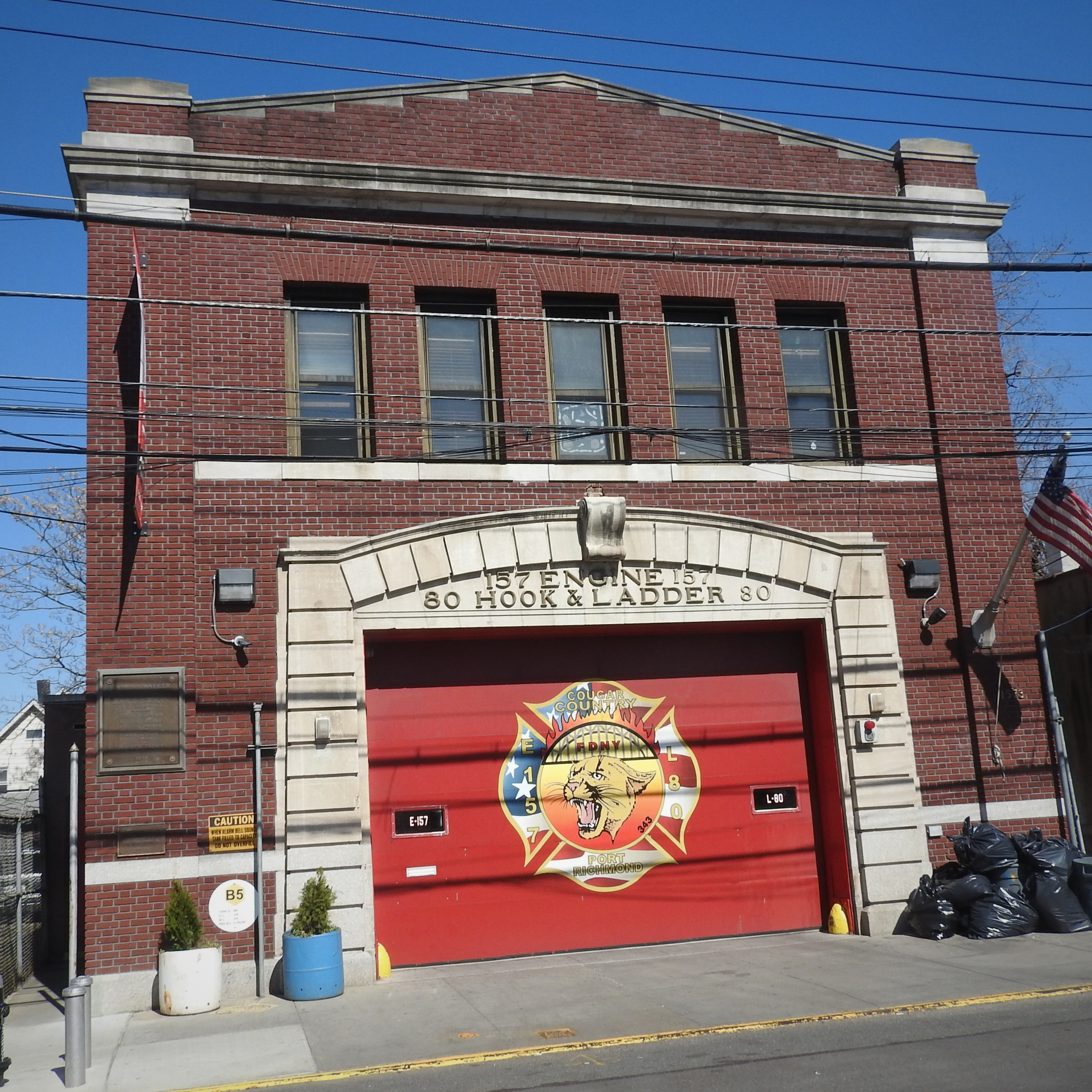
Firehouse in Mariners Harbor

Mariners Harbor is served by the New York City Fire Department (FDNY)'s Engine Co. 158, located at 65 Harbor Road.

== Post office and ZIP Codes ==
Mariners Harbor is located within two ZIP Codes: 10303 north of Baron Hirsch Cemetery and 10314 south of the cemetery. The United States Postal Service operates the Mariners Harbor Finance Station at 2079 Forest Avenue.

== Education ==
=== Schools ===
Most students in Mariners Harbor are zoned for Port Richmond High School, I.S.51, and P.S.22 and P.S.44, as well as a section that can generally be described as north of Continental Place and west of Van Pelt Avenue that is zoned for I.S 72 in Heartland Village P.S. 44 is located on 80 Maple Parkway and its current principal is Joseph Miller. P.S 44. has small class sizes, however the downside of P.S. 44 it is a somewhat worn building and furnishings. It offers grades Pre-K to fifth grade, and as of 2006 it had 69 full-time teachers and 5 part-time teachers, and has a total of 860 students enrolled, which makes the teacher student ratio 1:13. As of 2011, there were 884 students, with a student:teacher ratio of 12.5:1

=== Library ===
The New York Public Library (NYPL)'s Mariners Harbor branch is located at 206 South Avenue. Mariners Harbor Library is located amidst the rich maritime heritage of Staten Island's Mariners Harbor neighborhood. The one-story branch opened on December 16, 2013 and is located on a 16,000-square-foot (1,500 m^{2}) land plot. Mariners Harbor is the thirteenth branch of The New York Public Library on Staten Island and serves roughly 30,000 people.

== Transportation ==
Mariners Harbor is served by the S40, S46 and S48 local bus routes (and their rush-hour-only limited-stop counterparts, which are S90, S96 and S98 respectively). The Manhattan express bus routes in Mariners Harbor are SIM30, SIM33, SIM33C and SIM34.
