= John McAllister =

John McAllister may also refer to:

- John McAllister (boxer) (born 1960), Scottish boxer
- Harbour tugboat owned by the Standard Oil Company No. 16
