= USS Palawan =

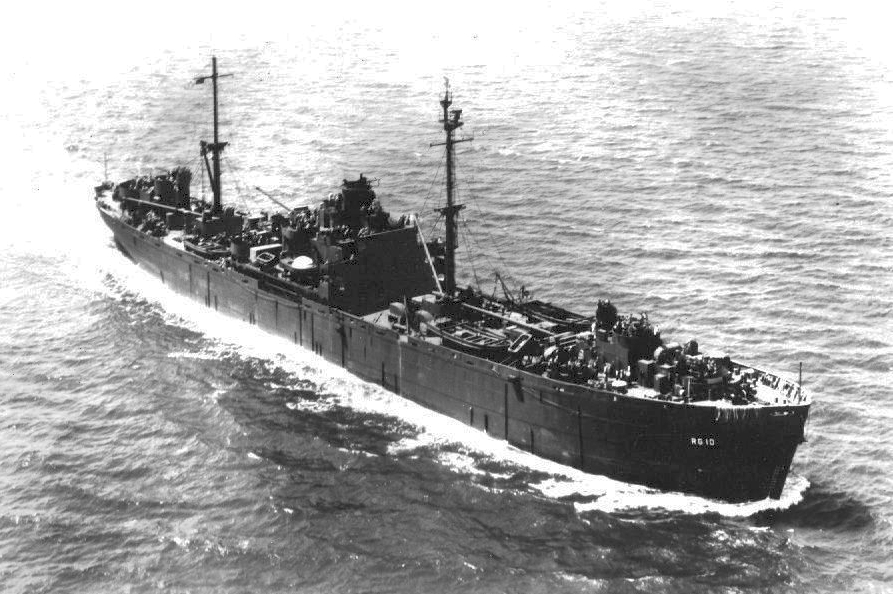

History

United States
- Name: USS Palawan
- Namesake: Palawan
- Builder: Bethlehem Shipbuilding Corporation
- Launched: 12 August 1944
- Sponsored by: Mrs. Louis Augustine
- Commissioned: 3 May 1945
- Decommissioned: 16 January 1947
- Stricken: 1 July 1963
- Fate: Sunk as artificial reef in 1977

General characteristics
- Class & type: Luzon
- Type: Internal combustion engine repair ship
- Displacement: 4,023 long tons (4,088 t)
- Length: 441 ft 6 in (134.57 m)
- Beam: 56 ft 11 in (17.35 m)
- Draft: 23 ft 0 in (7.01 m)
- Propulsion: Triple Expansion Machinery, Single Propeller, 2,500 hp (1,864 kW)
- Speed: 12.5 knots (23.2 km/h; 14.4 mph)
- Complement: 583
- Armament: 1 x single 5 in (130 mm) dual purpose gun mount, 1 x 3 in (76 mm) gun mount, 2 x twin 40 mm AA gun mounts, 12 x single 20 mm AA gun mounts

USS Palawan (ARG-10) was a Luzon class internal combustion engine repair ship that saw service in the United States Navy from 1945 to 1947. She was sunk as an artificial reef in 1977.

== History ==
Palawan, built as MCE hull 2668 by the Bethlehem-Fairfield, MD, was launched 12 August 1944; sponsored by Mrs. Louis Augustine; converted to an internal combustion engine repair ship at Bethlehem Key Highway Shipyard, Baltimore; and commissioned on 3 May 1945. She was named for Palawan island in the Philippines.

=== Pacific War ===
Following shakedown in Chesapeake Bay, Palawan took on ammunition and stores at Norfolk and sailed for Panama on 12 June. Transiting the Panama Canal on the 19th, it continued on into the Pacific, arriving at Tacloban, Philippines, on 3 August. A unit of ServDiv 101, it repaired small craft, giving priority to minesweepers, in San Pedro Bay until 1 September. On that date it steamed north to join ServDiv 103 and support the ships of Task Force 52 during Western Japan minesweeping operations. Until 10 March 1946 it repaired ships at Sasebo, then shifted to Shanghai, remaining there until the end of April when it returned to the United States.

=== Decommissioning and fate ===
Arriving at San Diego, California in June, it underwent inactivation, decommissioned, on 15 January 1947, and was berthed there in the Pacific Reserve Fleet. Palawan remained at San Diego until transferred to the Maritime Administration's National Defense Reserve Fleet at Suisun Bay, CA, on 23 February 1962. The repair ship was sold to the State of California Ship Reef Program on 1 November 1976. In 1977 Palawan was sunk off of Redondo Beach, CA as an artificial reef.
