= Columbian Iron Works and Dry Dock Co. =

Coordinates: 39°16′11.07″N 76°35′8.40″W

The Columbian Iron Works and Dry Dock Company (1872–1899), was located in Baltimore, Maryland on the Locust Point peninsula, adjacent to Fort McHenry. Founded by William T. Malster (1843–1907) who later partnered with William B. Reaney in 1879, it opened for business on 16 July 1880. The company was located on 8 acres (32,000 m^{2}) adjacent to Fort McHenry where it leased the property from the Baltimore Dry Dock Company.

It built several early vessels of the United States Navy and United States Revenue Cutter Service, including:

- USRC Tench Coxe
- USRC Seminole
- USS Detroit
- USS Petrel
- USS Montgomery
- USS Foote
- USS Rodgers
- USS Winslow
- USS McKee
- USS Tingey

It also built the Argonaut, a submarine designed by Simon Lake, and Plunger, a submarine designed by John Philip Holland for the U.S. Navy that was not accepted.

The company built the lighthouse tender USLHT Arbutus.

It went into receivership in 1899 and was reorganized as Baltimore Shipbuilding & Dry Dock Company and was purchased by William B. Skinner and Sons in 1905. In 1915, Skinner and Sons went into receivership and was reorganized as the Baltimore Dry Dock and Shipbuilding Corporation. This company was taken over by Bethlehem Steel in September 1921.
