= Joseph Lee Jayne =

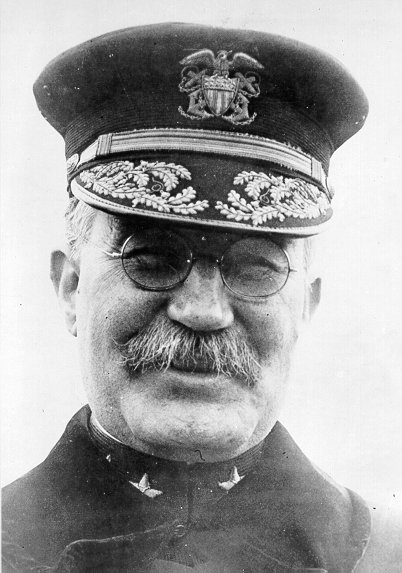
- Joseph Lee Jayne
- Born: May 30, 1863; Brandon, Mississippi
- Died: November 24, 1928 (aged 65); Denver, Colorado
- Military career
- Allegiance: United States
- Branch: United States Navy
- Rank: Rear Admiral
- Commands: USS Rodgers; Division 3, Battleship Force 1, Atlantic Fleet
- Conflicts: Spanish–American War; World War I
- Awards: Navy Cross

Joseph Lee Jayne (May 30, 1863 – November 24, 1928) was a rear admiral in the United States Navy, and a veteran of the Spanish–American War and World War I.

== Biography ==
Jayne was born in Brandon, Mississippi, the son of William McAfee Jayne and Julia Frances Kennon. He entered the United States Naval Academy at Annapolis in June 1878 as a cadet midshipman, and graduated in 1882.

He was promoted to ensign on 1 July 1884. He served in the Bureau of Equipment in Washington, D.C. as Assistant to the Inspector of Electric Lighting in 1893. He was promoted to lieutenant (junior grade) on 10 July 1894, and to lieutenant on 17 December 1897. He married Elizabeth Tilton Eastman on 3 December 1894.

During the Spanish–American War, Jayne commissioned and commanded the torpedo boat USS Rodgers in the naval blockade of Cuba.

Jayne was the Acting-Commandant of United States Naval Station Tutuila, and Military Governor of American Samoa, in October and November 1901.

From 16 October 1911 until 11 February 1914 he was the Superintendent of the United States Naval Observatory, serving with the rank of captain.

In December 1917 Jayne was promoted to rear admiral, and after the end of World War I, for his service as Commander of Division 3, Battleship Force 1, Atlantic Fleet, he was awarded the Navy Cross.

From 1 October 1918 to 25 September 1920 he was Commandant of 12th Naval District.

Rear Admiral Jayne died of apoplexy on 24 November 1928 at Newport, Rhode Island, at the age of 65.

== Gallery ==
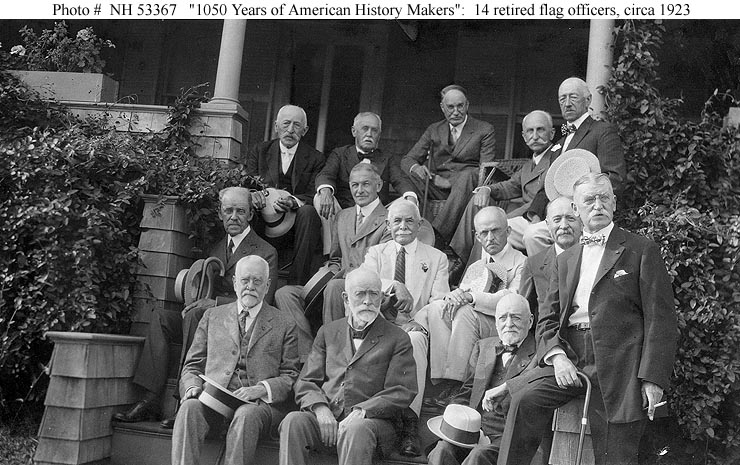
Jayne is third from the left in the back row in this photograph of 13 retired United States Navy rear admirals and one retired United States Marine Corps major general taken ca. 1923.

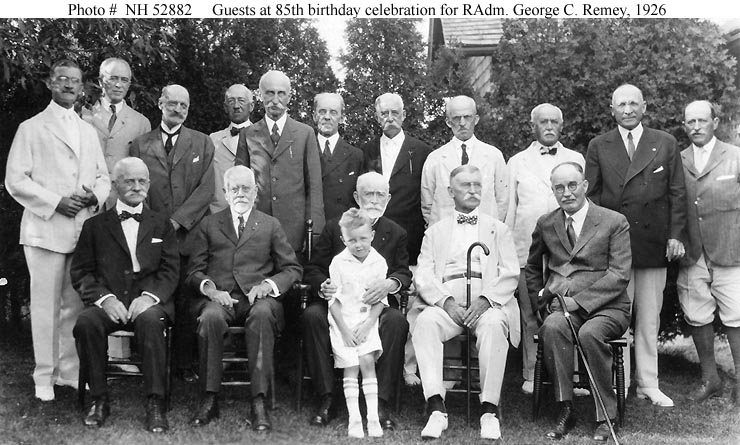
Jayne is seated on the right in this photo of retired flag officers taken at the 85th birthday party of Rear Admiral George C. Remey on 10 August 1926.

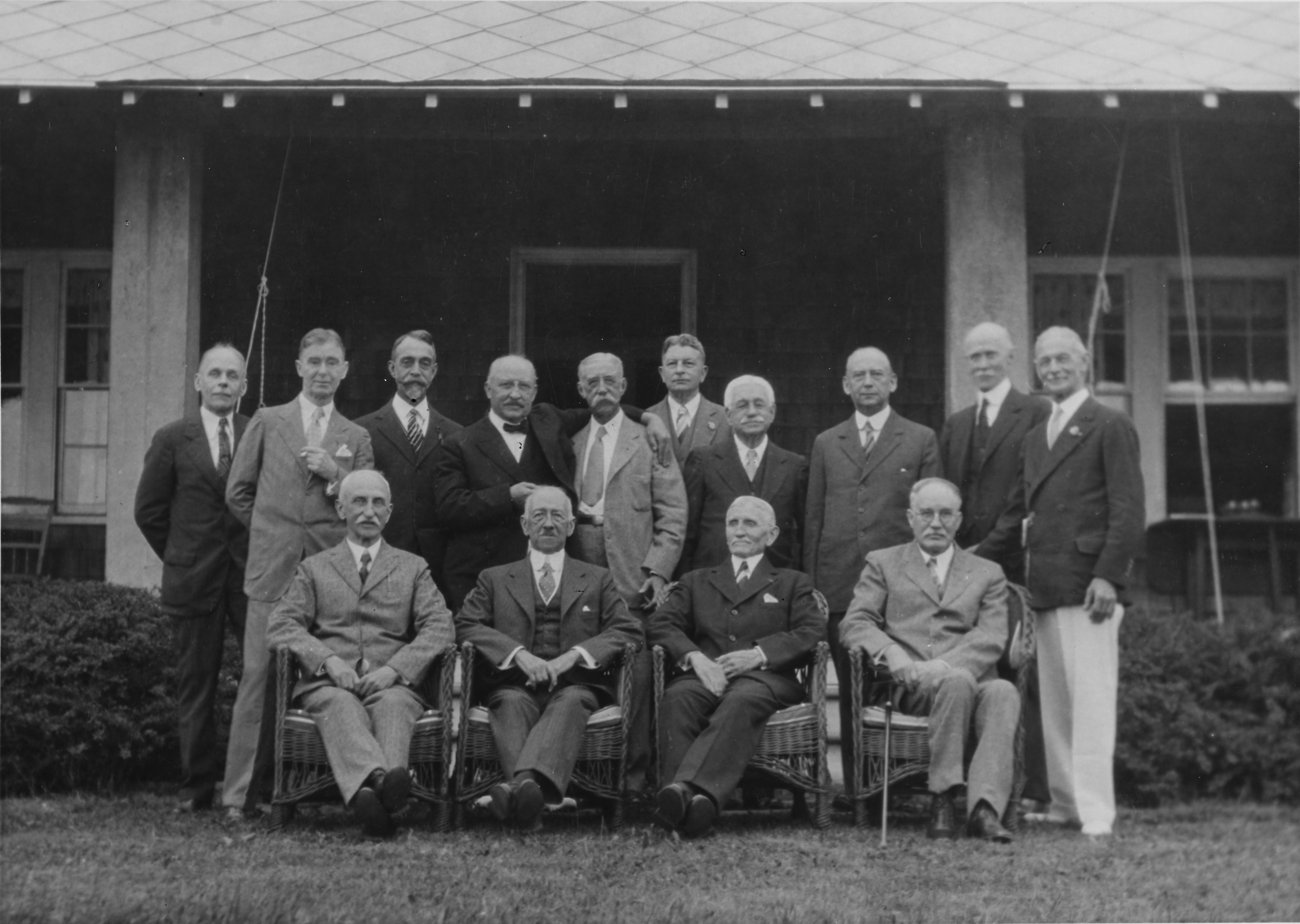
Jayne is seated on the right in this 7 August 1928 photograph of retired U.S. Navy rear admirals and other retirees at Rear Admiral Spencer S. Wood's home in Jamestown, Rhode Island.
