= USS Rodgers (TB-4) =

Torpedo boat of the United States Navy

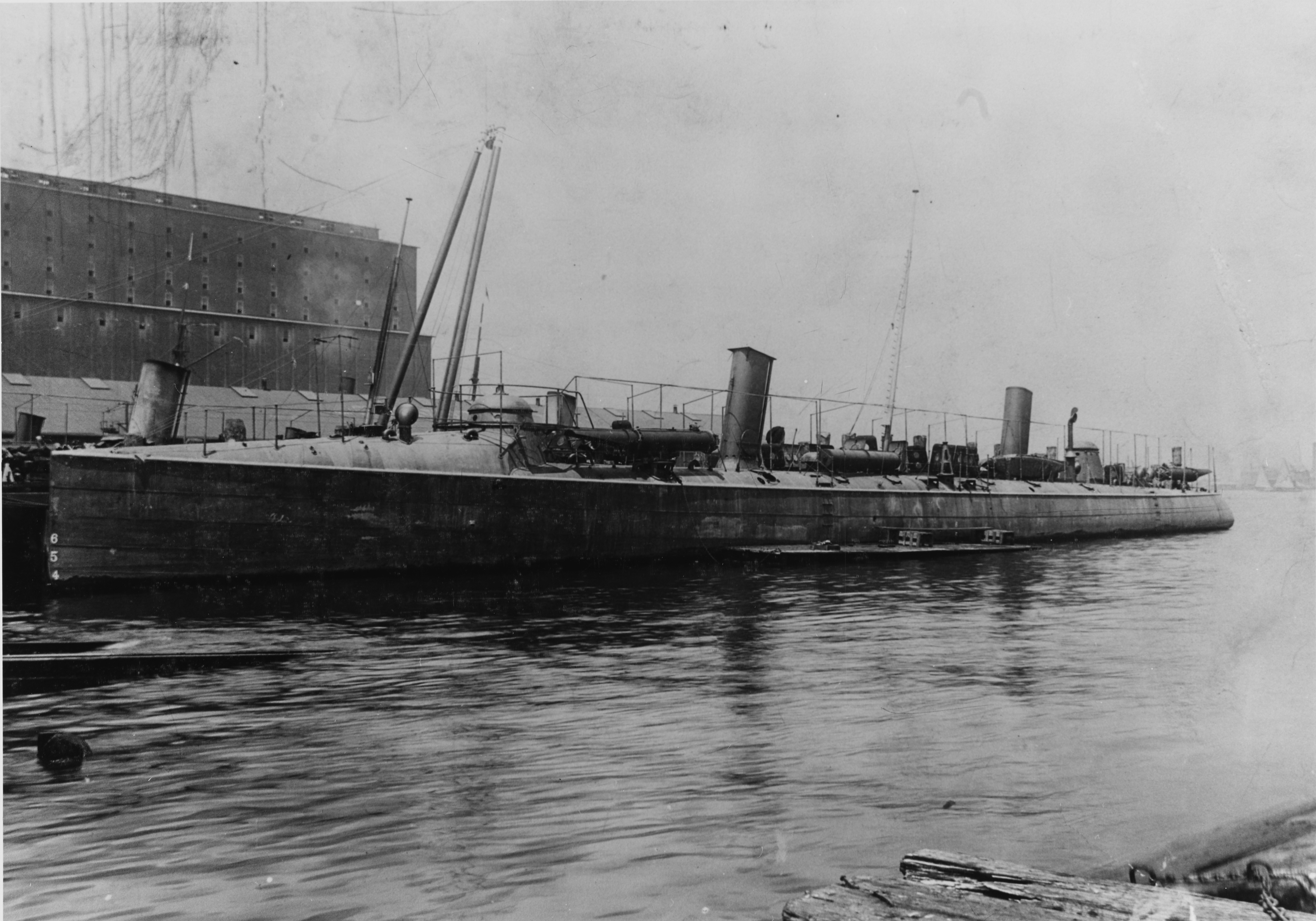
- USS Rodgers (TB-4), photographed circa 1897-98.

History

United States
- Name: Rodgers
- Namesake: John Rodgers (1772–1838); John Rodgers (American Civil War naval officer)
- Ordered: 26 July 1894 (authorised)
- Builder: Columbian Iron Works and Dry Dock Co., Baltimore, Maryland
- Laid down: 6 May 1896
- Launched: 10 November 1896
- Commissioned: 2 April 1898
- Decommissioned: 12 March 1919
- Renamed: Coast Torpedo Boat No. 2, 1 August 1918
- Stricken: 28 October 1919
- Identification: TB-4
- Fate: Sold, 19 July 1920

General characteristics
- Class & type: Foote-class torpedo boat
- Displacement: 142 long tons (144 t)
- Length: 160 ft (49 m)
- Beam: 16 ft 1 in (4.90 m)
- Draft: 5 ft (1.5 m) (mean)
- Installed power: 2 × Mosher boilers; 2,000 ihp (1,491 kW)
- Propulsion: vertical triple expansion engines; 2 × screw propellers
- Speed: 25 kn (29 mph; 46 km/h); 24.49 kn (28.18 mph; 45.36 km/h) (Speed on Trial)
- Complement: 20 officers and enlisted
- Armament: 3 × 1-pounder (37 mm (1.46 in)) guns; 3 × 18-inch (450 mm) torpedo tubes (3x1)

The second USS Rodgers (Torpedo Boat No. 4/TB-4/Coast Torpedo Boat No. 2) was a United States Navy torpedo boat, laid down by the Columbian Iron Works & Dry Dock Co., Baltimore, Maryland, on 6 May 1896; launched on 10 November 1896; and commissioned on 2 April 1898, Lt. Joseph Lee Jayne in command. It was named after John Rodgers as well as John Rodgers.

== Service history ==
=== Spanish–American War ===
Fitted out at Norfolk, Virginia, Rodgers began training in Chesapeake Bay in mid-April. On 24 April 1898, the United States Congress declared war on Spain and five days later the torpedo boat got underway for the Caribbean. Arriving at Key West on 9 May, she joined the blockading vessels off Havana on the 21st; remained with them through the 23rd; then sailed to join the fleet cruising off the north coast of Cuba to prevent the Spanish fleet from reaching the blockaded city from the east. Employed primarily as a dispatch boat, she returned to Key West in early June, only to depart again on the 15th to carry mail to the fleet convoying Major General Shafter's army to Santiago. Making rendezvous on the 16th, she remained with the force until the 21st when she moved along the coast to Guantanamo Bay to deliver dispatches. On the 22nd she returned to Santiago for picket duty at the harbor entrance, but returned to Guantanamo Bay for repairs 23 June – 22 July. A short dispatch run preceded another repair period, 24 July – 14 August, by which time Rodgers had received orders back to the United States. At Hampton Roads by the 26th, she continued on to New York, arriving on the 31st for a yard overhaul.

=== 1899–1919 ===
The torpedo boat remained in port for much of the next eight years, occasionally commissioning for short periods of active duty with the 3rd Torpedo Flotilla and the East Coast Squadron. In the spring of 1906 she was transferred to the Reserve Torpedo Flotilla and on 1 November she was decommissioned at Norfolk.

Shifted to Charleston in 1908, Rodgers was assigned to the Massachusetts Naval Militia on 14 May 1910. From 8 June, when she was delivered to that organization, until 1916, she conducted training cruises out of Boston along the southern New England coast. Between 1916 and 1918, she extended her range of operations and performed coastal patrol duties as far north as the Maritime Provinces.

Renamed Coast Torpedo Boat No. 2, 1 August 1918, she was decommissioned for the last time on 12 March 1919; struck from the Navy List on 28 October 1919; and sold to the U.S. Rail & Salvage Corp., Newburgh, New York, in 1920.
