= USS Avenge (AM-423) =

Minesweeper of the United States Navy

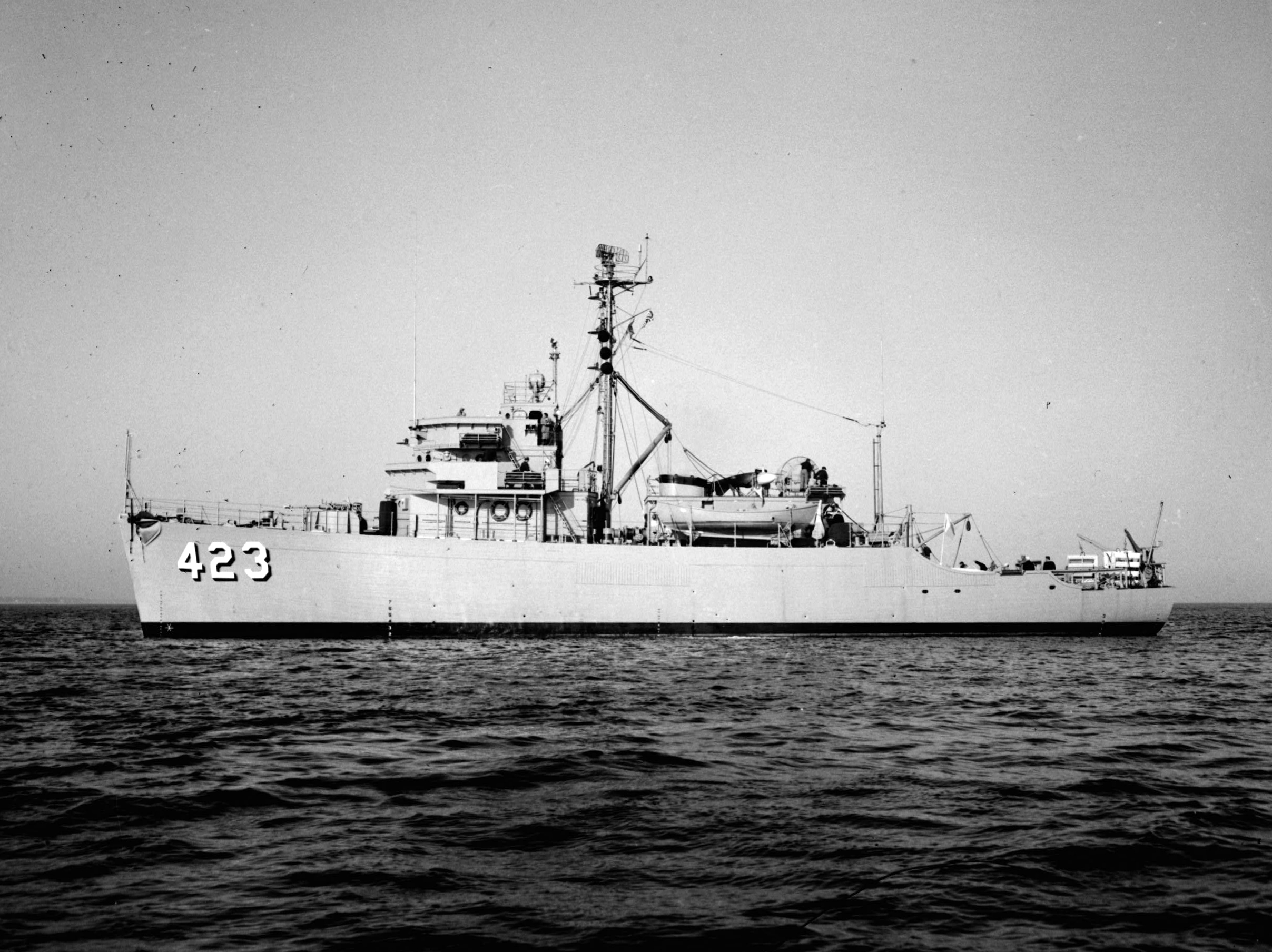

History

United States
- Laid down: 1 August 1951
- Launched: 15 March 1953
- Commissioned: 13 May 1954
- Decommissioned: 31 January 1970
- Stricken: 1 February 1970
- Fate: destroyed in a fire

General characteristics
- Displacement: 620 tons
- Length: 172 ft (52 m)
- Beam: 36 ft (11 m)
- Draught: 10 ft (3.0 m)
- Speed: 15 knots
- Complement: 74
- Armament: one 40 mm mount

USS Avenge (MSO-423) was an Agile-class minesweeper acquired by the United States Navy for the task of clearing mines that had been placed in the water to prevent the safe passage of ships.

The second ship to be named Avenge by the Navy, AM-423 was laid down on 1 August 1951 at Stamford, Connecticut, by the Luders Marine Construction Co.; launched on 15 March 1953; sponsored by Mrs. A. E. Luders Jr.; and commissioned at the New York Navy Yard on 13 May 1954, Lt. Waymon Taylor in command. Avenge was reclassified as Ocean Minesweeper MSO-423 on 14 January 1955.

== Commissioned as a new minesweeper ==
After completing shakedown training, the minesweeper sailed on 6 August for her home port, Charleston, South Carolina, and arrived there on 8 August. She conducted local operations until entering the Charleston Naval Shipyard on 14 January 1955 for conversion. During this period, her designation was changed to MSO-423, before she resumed her activities in April and began preparations for deployment.

== First Med cruise ==
On 6 September, Avenge sailed for the Mediterranean. Her ports of call during that deployment with the United States Sixth Fleet included Gibraltar; Barcelona, Spain; Nice, Cannes, and Toulon, France; Monaco; Valletta, Malta; Naples, Italy; and Palma de Mallorca, Balearic Islands. The ship left Gibraltar on 17 January 1956 and arrived back in Charleston on the 31st. Following leave and upkeep, the ship sailed on 9 April for the coast of Nova Scotia and participated in minesweeping operations off Halifax before getting underway on 14 May to return to her home port.

== North Atlantic operations ==
The vessel operated for two months in the Charleston area, then left on 16 July to return to Canadian waters. She spent two months assisting in survey and beach clearance operations in connection with DEW line radar sites. The ship left St. John's, Newfoundland, on 4 September, and arrived back in Charleston on 11 September.

== Second Med cruise ==
Avenge returned to Argentia, Newfoundland, on 15 January 1957, took part in cold weather minesweeping operations, and then got underway for New York on 30 January. She touched at Charleston on 7 February and held local operations through 29 August. On that day, the minesweeper sailed for the Mediterranean. After reaching Gibraltar, she visited Valletta, Malta; Suda Bay, Crete; Kos Island, Greece; Gaeta and Naples, Italy; and İzmir, Turkey. While deployed with the 6th Fleet, she conducted joint exercises with the Italian Navy at Gaeta. She also held combined operations with the Royal Navy at Malta in January 1958. After five months in the Mediterranean, Avenge returned to Charleston on 13 February.

== East Coast operations ==
In late March, the ship took part in amphibious exercises at Onslow Beach, North Carolina, and in mine exercises at Little Creek, Virginia. Avenge departed Charleston on 11 January 1959, bound for Savannah, Georgia, where she arrived on the 12th and entered the shipyard of the Savannah Machine and Foundry Co. for overhaul. The minesweeper returned to Charleston on 14 March for refresher training. During May and June, she took part in a mine test in the Charleston area before sailing once more on 24 July for the Mediterranean.

== Return to the Mediterranean ==
While on duty with the 6th Fleet, Avenge took part in numerous exercises. The largest came in Octoter at La Spezia, Italy, when she joined units of the French, Greek, Turkish, Belgian, and Italian navies in Exercise "Gauge." She returned to Charleston on 11 February 1960.

The ship departed Charleston on 23 May to participate in Operation Springboard, in the Caribbean. In July, she carried out an assignment off Cape Canaveral, Florida, and then proceeded to her home port for overhaul.

== Caribbean operations ==
Avenge headed back to the Caribbean in January 1961 for amphibious exercises which lasted well into February. After returning home, she made an unscheduled deployment to the Caribbean in April in response to a political crisis in the Dominican Republic and did not get back to Charleston until August. Thereafter, type training and minesweeping exercises off the South Carolina coast kept her busy through the end of 1961.

In January 1962, Avenge operated from Panama City, Florida, providing services for the Naval Mine Defense Laboratory and reported back to her home port in February. Following an overhaul, she returned to Panama City in August. Intensive minesweeping training exercises in company with Mine Division 82 occupied her time in October and November.

== European operations ==
Early in January 1963, the ship took 19 days to cross the Atlantic due to winter storms as she embarked upon another Mediterranean tour during which she took part in several combined exercises and visited ports in Italy(Naples, La Spezia, Livorno, Augusta Bay), Greece (Kalamata, Thessalonika), and France. Avenge participated in NATO Exercise "Fair Game" before returning to Charleston on 5 June. Following leave and upkeep, she proceeded to Panama City to work with the Naval Mine Defense Laboratory. The minesweeper reported back to Charleston on 20 November and began preparations for a deployment to the Caribbean. Avenge won the Marjorie Sterrett Award as best ship of type in the Atlantic Fleet for 1963.

== Caribbean tour of duty ==
In February 1964, the vessel began a two-month cruise to the Caribbean, working out of Guantánamo Bay, Cuba. She arrived back in Charleston in April for leave and upkeep and then entered the naval shipyard at Charleston in May for repairs which were followed by refresher training and local operations. In late December, Avenge got underway for the Caribbean. She visited Guantanamo Bay; Roosevelt Roads, Puerto Rico; and Bonaire, Netherlands Antilles. The end of 1964 found Avenge anchored at Frederiksted, Saint Croix, in the American Virgin Islands.

== Supporting missile test programs ==
During January and February 1965, Avenge operated out of Guantanamo Bay before arriving back at Charleston in March and resuming a full schedule of training exercises and operations. In August, she was part of the Gemini V recovery force off Florida's Cape Kennedy. In early December, the minesweeper took part in an amphibious exercise off Vieques, Puerto Rico, before returning to her home port for the Christmas holidays.

In February 1966, the ship was part of the recovery force off Cape Kennedy during tests of the Apollo rocket and returned to Charleston in March and conducted local operations through June. She sailed to Savannah once more in early July for another period of overhaul, and she left the shipyard in September for refresher training in the Norfolk area.

== Testing minesweep gear ==
The vessel returned to Panama City on 14 January 1967 and helped to test minesweeping gear being developed for use by helicopters. She visited the cities of Tampa, West Palm Beach, and Jacksonville, Florida, in February and arrived back at Charleston on 28 February. After a brief tender availability, Avenge provided services to the Mine Warfare School at Charleston before sailing for Newport, Rhode Island, on 2 May to conduct refresher training. Following a brief visit to Boston, Massachusetts, on 20 May, she arrived in Charleston on 26 May.

== Repairs at Rota, Spain ==
The minesweeper entered Detyens Shipyard, Wando, South Carolina, on 17 July for alterations. Upon the completion of the modifications and repairs, she prepared for deployment and sailed on 16 August for the Mediterranean. After suffering extensive damage en route, Avenge reached Rota, Spain, on 2 September and remained there for repairs until sailing on 25 September for İzmir, Turkey, where she rejoined her division. She participated in exercises off Dikili, Turkey, with British and Turkish ships from 16 through 25 October. Avenge moved to Naples in early November for a tender availability and then visited La Spezia, Italy; Ajaccio and Lovo Santo, Corsica; and Toulon, France, before closing the year at Naples undergoing upkeep.

An amphibious exercise took place at Porto Scudo, Sardinia, on 3 January 1968, 10 days before Avenge began her journey home on 13 January. She reached Charleston on 3 February and entered a leave and upkeep status. The minesweeper got underway on 15 April to take part in mine tests and returned to port on 26 May for a standdown period in preparation for her forthcoming modernization.

== Severely damaged in a fire ==
Avenge was taken in tow on 26 August for the voyage to Baltimore, Maryland, where she entered the Bethlehem Steel Corporation's Key Highway Shipyard on 30 August. The yardwork continued into 1969. On 27 September, she was drydocked at Bethlehem Fort McHenry Shipyard in Baltimore. A fire of unknown origin broke out on 6 October and caused extensive damage to the midships section of the vessel.

== Decommissioning ==
A subsequent survey found that it would not be economically feasible to restore the vessel, and Avenge was decommissioned on 31 January 1970. Her name was struck from the Navy list on 1 February 1970.
