= USS Serapis (IX-213) =

Storage tanker of United States Navy

History

United States
- Name: USS Serapis
- Namesake: Serapis
- Builder: Baltimore Dry Dock and Shipbuilding Corp., Baltimore, Maryland
- Launched: 18 December 1920, as SS District of Columbia
- Acquired: February 1945
- Commissioned: 3 August 1945
- Decommissioned: 19 October 1945
- Renamed: Serapis (IX-213), 9 March 1945
- Stricken: 1 November 1945
- Fate: Sold for scrapping, May 1947

General characteristics
- Type: Mobile floating storage tanker
- Tonnage: 7,641 long tons (7,764 t)
- Length: 450 ft (140 m)
- Beam: 59 ft (18 m)
- Propulsion: Single screw
- Speed: 9.5 knots (17.6 km/h; 10.9 mph)
- Complement: 71
- Armament: 1 × 4 in (100 mm) gun; 1 × 3 in (76 mm) gun; 8 × 20 mm guns

USS Serapis (IX-213) was a single-screw tanker that served for a short time as a floating storage tanker for the United States Navy at the end of World War II.

Built in 1921 for the United States Shipping Board by Baltimore Dry Dock and Shipbuilding, Baltimore, Maryland, the ship was originally named SS District of Columbia. Allocated to the Navy by the Maritime Commission in February 1945, renamed Serapis, and designated IX-213 on 9 March 1945, she was partially converted at San Francisco and delivered to the Navy at Pearl Harbor. The ship was commissioned on 3 August 1945.

== Service history ==
Acquired for temporary wartime use as a mobile floating storage unit for gasoline and diesel oil at Pearl Harbor and in the Trust Territories, Serapis was declared surplus after the cessation of hostilities in the Pacific. She remained at Pearl Harbor until 16 September when she was taken in tow by the Keosanqua (ATA-198) for her return to California.

On 2 October, she arrived at San Francisco where she was decommissioned and returned to the Maritime Commission on 19 October. Her name was struck from the Navy List on 1 November 1945, and she was sold in May 1947 to the American Iron and Metal Company for scrapping.
