= USS Serapis =

USS Serapis may refer to the following ships operated by the United States Navy:

- Serapis, was a British frigate known as HMS Serapis captured by John Paul Jones and the crew of Bonhomme Richard in 1779. She was later sold to France.
- Serapis, was a planned Algoma-class sloop, authorized in 1864 but never laid down
- USS Serapis (IX-213), was a single-screw tanker built in 1921 and originally named District of Columbia.
