= Baltimore (tug) =

Steam-powered tugboat

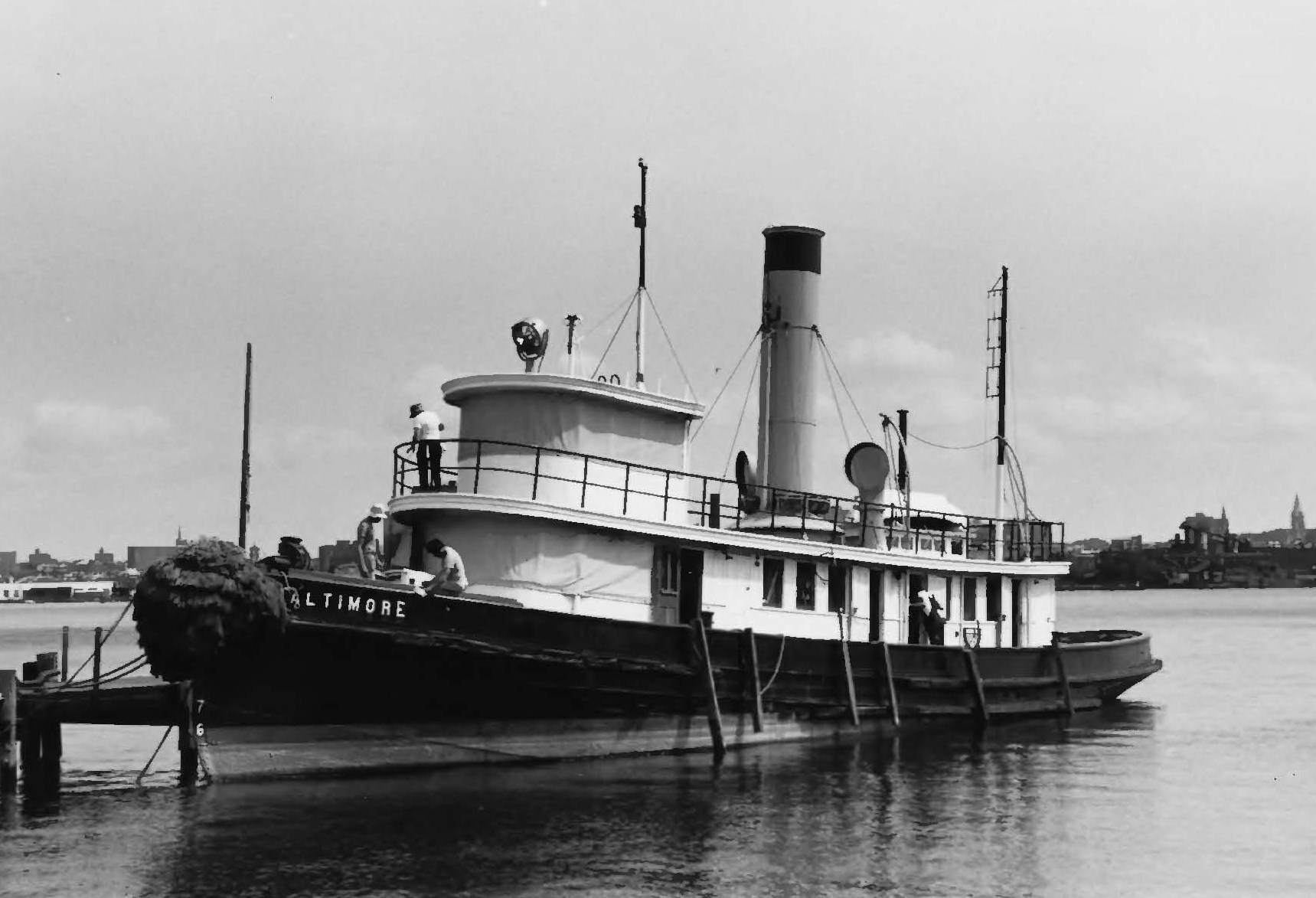
- Baltimore in 1989

History

United States
- Name: Baltimore
- Namesake: Baltimore, MD
- Builder: Skinner Shipbuilding Company
- Launched: 1906
- Status: Museum ship

General characteristics
- Tonnage: 81 tons (gross), 55 tons (net)
- Length: 84.5 ft (25.8 m)
- Installed power: Compound reciprocating steam engine
- Baltimore (tug)
- U.S. National Register of Historic Places
- U.S. National Historic Landmark
- Location within Maryland
- Location: Baltimore Museum of Industry, Baltimore, Maryland
- Coordinates: 39°16′28″N 76°36′1″W
- Built: 1906
- Architect: Skinner Shipbuilding
- NRHP reference No.: 93001613

Significant dates
- Added to NRHP: 4 November 1993
- Designated NHL: 4 November 1993

Baltimore is a preserved steam-powered tugboat, built in 1906 by the Skinner Shipbuilding Company of Baltimore, Maryland. She is formerly the oldest operating steam tugboat in the United States, but at present does not hold an operating license issued by the US Coast Guard, so is unable to leave her dock at the Baltimore Museum of Industry on Key Highway, Baltimore. Her hull is not capable of operating on open water. Baltimore was built and operated as a harbor inspection tug, capable of acting as a municipal tugboat for city barges, as well as an official welcoming vessel and VIP launch, an auxiliary fireboat, and as a light icebreaker.

She was declared a National Historic Landmark in 1993, and is part of the Baltimore Museum of Industry. The Baltimore and Chesapeake Steamboat Co., a nonprofit organization, was established to maintain the tugboat.

== Description ==
Baltimore is equipped with a compound reciprocating steam engine, fed by a Scotch marine boiler. Hull construction is rivetted iron, with a wooden deckhouse. The 84.5 feet (25.8 m) wrought iron hull has proven to be more durable than steel or wood. Displacement measures 81 gross tons and 55 net tons. The hull form is typical for its time, with an upright stem, moderate sheer and elliptical stern. Bulwarks are vertical about the stern rather than inwardly-sloped as in more modern designs.

=== Boiler ===
The boiler was a replacement for the original, fitted in 1922, but is similar to the original. The cylindrical boiler measures 9.5 feet (2.9 m) by 10.25 feet (3.12 m), with two Morrison furnaces connecting to a combustion chamber at the rear. The fire tubes pass from the back to the front of the boiler. Exhaust passes through an annular steam dryer/superheater on its way to the smokestack. Originally designed to burn coal, the boiler was converted to oil in 1957. The boiler has since been converted back to coal and the original coal bunkers restored by the Baltimore Museum of Industry as part of their conservation and restoration work. Steam pressure as designed was 150 psi (1,000 kPa), however it is limited to 115 psi (790 kPa) by the boiler rating.

=== Engine ===
The tug is powered by a compound double-acting, vertical-inverted steam reciprocating engine, a common type for tugboats. A 12 inches (30 cm) high-pressure cylinder operates at 150 psi (1,000 kPa) (now 115 psi (790 kPa)), while a 25 inches (64 cm) low-pressure cylinder takes the high-pressure cylinder's exhaust at 17psi. Both cylinders have a stroke of 22 inches (56 cm), offset by 90 degrees to keep the engine from being stuck on center. A manual jacking gear acts as a further measure to prevent sticking on center. Stephenson valve gear permits reversing, aided by a steam reversing engine or ram to adjust eccentric rods. The propeller has a diameter of 6.75 feet (2.06 m) with a pitch of 8.66 feet (2.64 m).

=== Auxiliaries and pumps ===
Baltimore has a rotative duplex donkey pump, duplex feed pump, duplex sanitary pump and a centrifugal circulating pump. The pump system provides a moderate fire fighting capability through two hose standpipes on top of the pilothouse. Piping runs to each compartment allow water to be forced out through air pressure in the event of flooding.

A 5.5 kW Westinghouse dynamo provides electrical power, driven by an American Blocwer steam engine at 500 RPM. A Pyle National 5 kW reserve generator was installed in 1957. The electrical system was unusual in 1906, and was fitted when the yard was able to build the tug for substantially less than the estimated cost.

=== Superstructure ===
The full-length deckhouse is built of Georgia pine, with a similarly constructed pilothouse on top, set slightly back from the front of the deckhouse. Both are sheathed with tongue-and-groove planking. Windows are sash units designed to drop into self-draining metal pockets in the bulkheads. A saloon fills the front of the deckhouse, finished with oak match board. Aft of a bulkhead a companionway ladder leads to the pilothouse. The middle of the deckhouse covers the boiler and engine room spaces. The rear of the deckhouse contains the galley, provided with a Shipmate coal-burning stove. The deckhouse ends at toilets, officers to port and crew to starboard.

The pilothouse has an elliptical forward face and a flat rear. A steam radiator provides heat, and a ladder provides access to the pilothouse roof. The large wheel dominates the house, its size dictated by the entirely manual steering gear, an anachronistic feature for the time. Voice pipes run to the engine room and saloon. Bells provide additional communication to the engine room. Whistles are fitted for signals to ships and shore.

A 20 feet (6.1 m) Kallenweller metal lifeboat for eleven people is carried on chocks above the engine room skylight on the deckhouse, lifted by pipe davits.

== History ==
Baltimore acted as a general-purpose harbor vessel, taking on roles as needed in her capacity as a representative of the city. The tug took on school tours, carried VIPs and attended ceremonies. On one occasion in 1922, a newly launched ship capsized onto Baltimore, damaging her pilothouse. The city took advantage of the repair period to replace Baltimore's boiler.

In her capacity as an official welcoming vessel for the City of Baltimore, Baltimore met the German unarmed merchant submarine Deutschland on her first voyage to America, prior to the United States' entry into World War I. Baltimore and the city quarantine tug Thomas F. Timmins patrolled the vicinity of Deutschland's berth to ensure American neutrality.

In 1956 the Baltimore Harbor Board was dissolved and its assets, including Baltimore, transferred to the Maryland Port Authority. In 1963 the state sold Baltimore to Alexander Luckton Jr., owner of Baltimore's Poe Bookstore. Luckton proposed to use Baltimore as a tow vessel for a barge carrying 100,000 books bound for Puerto Rico. With the failure of Luckton's health the project was called off and Baltimore was sold to the Harbor Towing Company of Baltimore, which in turn sold her the same year to Samuel F. and Joanna J. DuPont, who had her repaired and certified as a steam yacht. In 1979 Baltimore sank at her dock on the Sassafras River in fifteen feet of water. In 1981 DuPont offered the tug to the Baltimore Museum of Industry. After several tries the tug was raised, and has been undergoing repair and conservation ever since. In 2009 the project was awarded federal funding for further restoration work, and additional funding in 2011 through a Maryland Heritage Areas Authority grant.

== See also ==
- Sergeant Floyd (towboat), a similar vessel for the U.S. Army Corps of Engineers, also a National Historic Landmark
- List of National Historic Landmarks in Maryland
- National Register of Historic Places listings in South and Southeast Baltimore
