= Bethlehem Sabine Shipyard =

US Shipyard in Texas

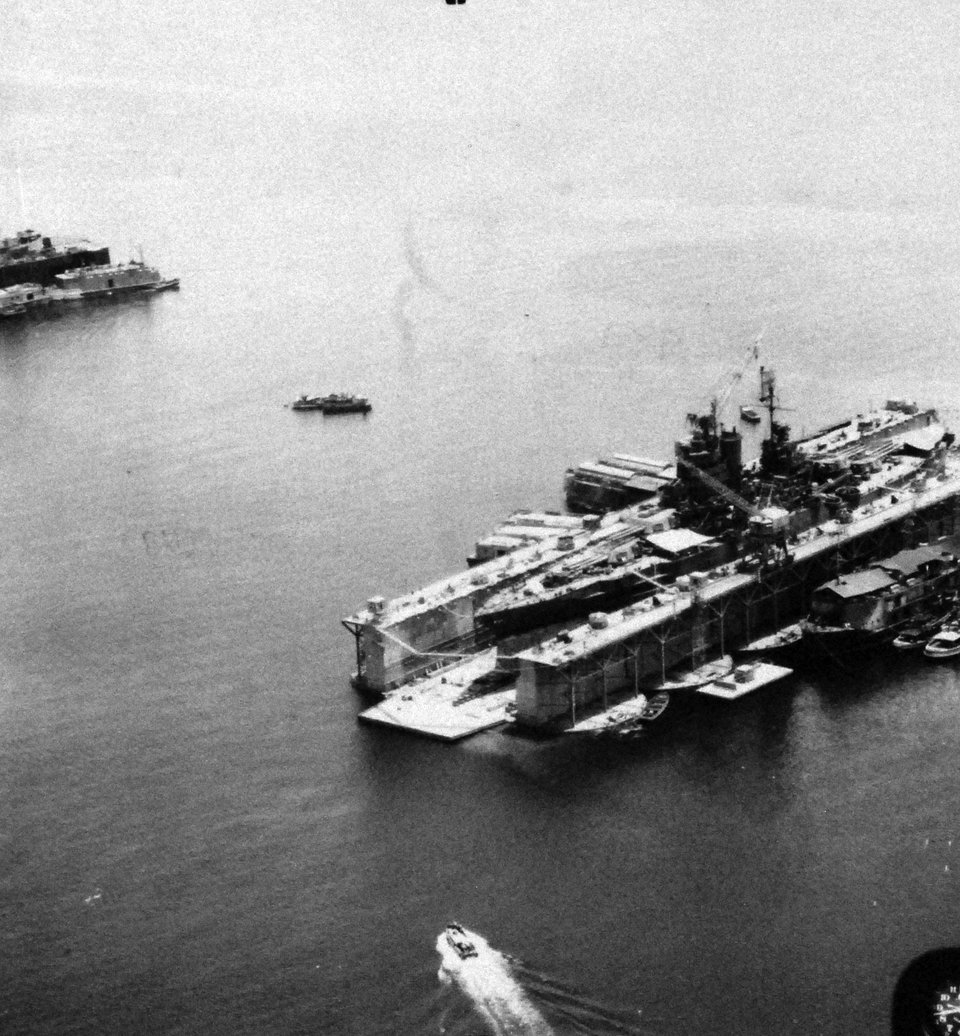
USS ABSD-5 at Manicani Island, in July 1945, move to Sabine Shipyard in 1984.

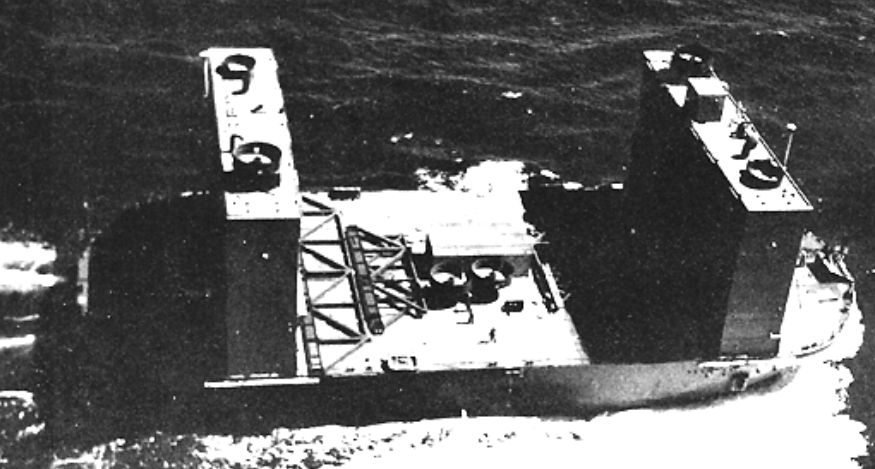
One Advance Base Sectional Dock (ABSD) section under tow in 1944

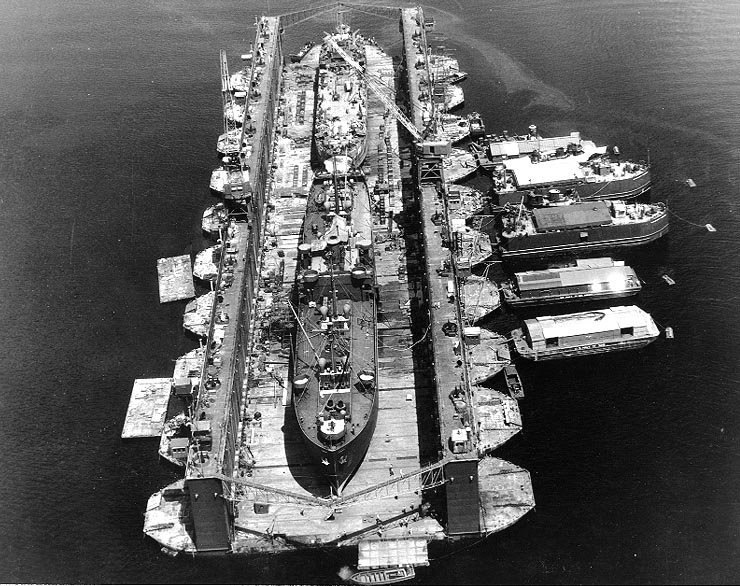
USS Artisan (ABSD-1), USS ABSD-5 sister ship, with USS Antelope (IX-109) and LST-120 in the dock at Espiritu Santo, New Hebrides Islands, 8 January 1945, before moving to Manicani Island

Bethlehem Sabine Shipyard, or Sabine Shipyard was a 223-acre shipyard of Bethlehem Steel in Port Arthur, Texas. The Bethlehem Shipbuilding Corporation's Sabine Shipyard opened in August 1985. The yard serviced offshore drilling rigs and ships. The Sabine Shipyard had a nation's largest floating drydock. Bethlehem purchased the United States Navy surplus drydock, USS ABSD-5 that was at Pearl Harbor, Hawaii. USS ABSD-5 seven-sections were tugged to the Sabine Yard arriving in December 1984. USS ABSD-5 has a lift capacity of 64,000 tons.

In 1995 the Bethlehem Sabine Shipyard was sold to Texas Drydock Inc. Texas Drydock Inc headquarters is in Gulfport, Mississippi.

In 2005 Sembcorp Marine of Singapore purchased the Sabine yard, renaming the yard SembCorp-Sabine Shipyard. Sembcorp saw the demand for rig repair after damage done by hurricane Katrina. SembCorp has yards in Singapore, China and Brazil.

== See also ==
- Dry dock
- List of auxiliaries of the United States Navy
