= USRC Tench Coxe =

Ship of the U.S. Revenue Cutter Service

History

United States
- Name: Tench Coxe
- Namesake: Tench Coxe
- Builder: William T. Malster
- Cost: $14,800
- Launched: 7 June 1876
- Commissioned: 27 October 1876
- Decommissioned: 6 September 1893
- Fate: Sold

General characteristics
- Displacement: 39 tons
- Propulsion: steam

USRC Tench Coxe was a 39-ton harbor steam-powered vessel that was built by William T. Malster, in Baltimore, Maryland. Her contract price was $14,800 and the cutter was to "be delivered at Philadelphia." She was launched on 7 June 1876 and arrived at her home port of Philadelphia on 16 September 1876. On 23 October, her first commanding officer, Revenue Captain (Acting) Eric Gabrielson, was ordered to place the cutter in commission and to "ship crew." Captain Gabrielson placed the Tench Coxe in commission on 27 October 1876.

Besides serving in Philadelphia, she was also detached for additional duties. She served on quarantine duty at Lewes, Delaware from 2 August 1884 until being ordered back to Philadelphia on 2 September of that same year.

She was decommissioned on 6 September 1893 and sold.
