= Harborview, Baltimore =

Community in Baltimore, Maryland, US

Coordinates: 39°16′38″N 76°36′17″W

Harborview is a waterfront community located in Baltimore, Maryland, United States. The community sits at the eastern base of the Federal Hill neighborhood in a former industrial area, occupied mainly by shipyards.

It includes a high-rise residential building, low-rise town homes, and marina facilities.

== See also ==
- HarborView Condominium
- List of Baltimore neighborhoods
