= Baltimore Museum of Industry =

Coordinates: 39°16′26″N 76°36′5″W

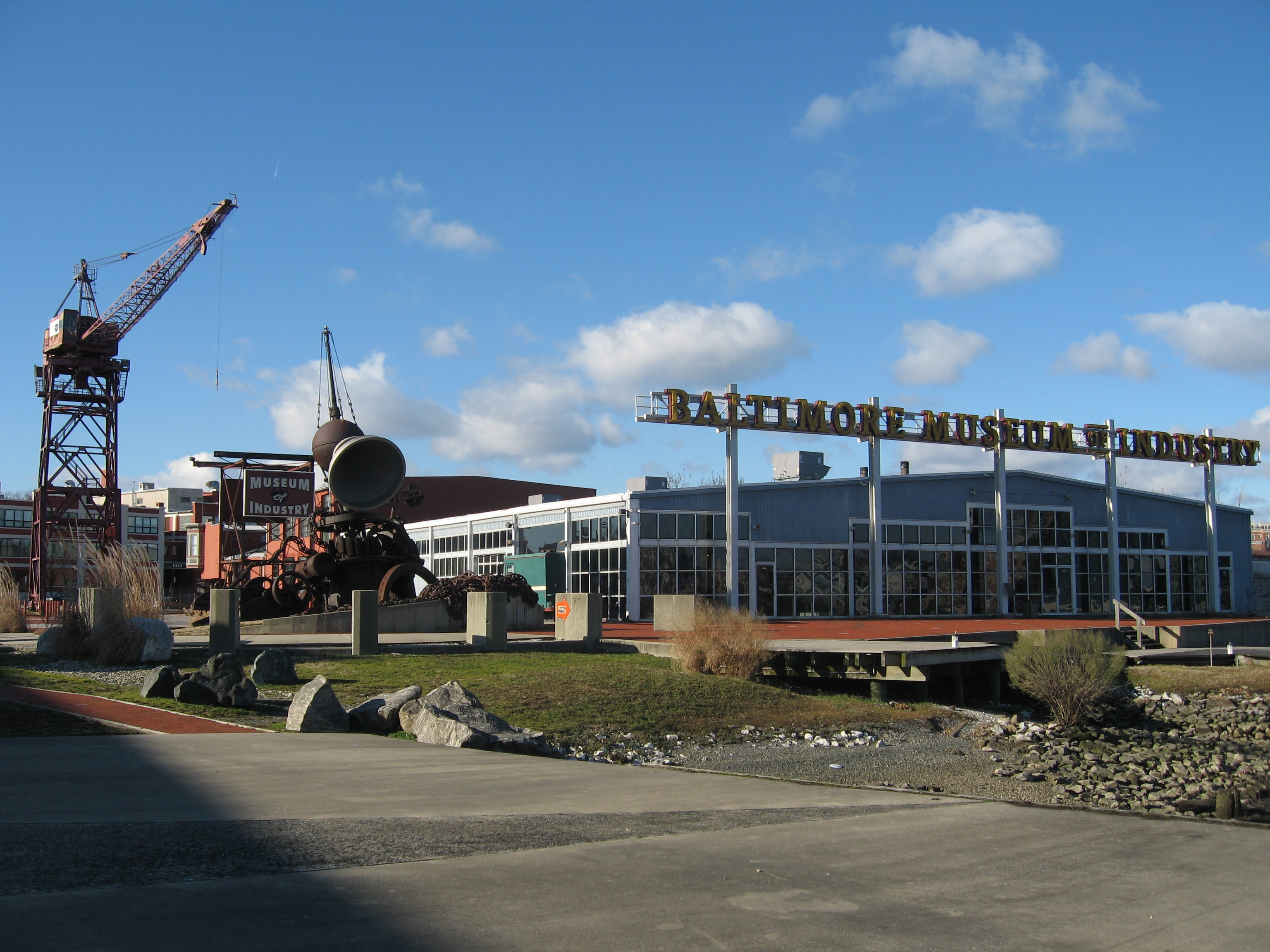
- Established: 1977; 49 years ago
- Location: Baltimore, Maryland, United States
- Type: Industrial museum
- Public transit access: Circulator: Banner Route
- Website: http://www.thebmi.org/

The Baltimore Museum of Industry is a museum in Baltimore, Maryland, United States. Located in an old cannery complex, the museum has exhibits on various types of manufacturing and industry from the early 20th century. There are several hands-on sections with working equipment and other artifacts.

== Museum interior ==
The BMI galleries recreate parts of a cannery, a garment loft from 1900, a machine shop from 1900, a print shop, Dr. Bunting's Pharmacy (where Noxzema was invented), as well as exhibits on the food industry in Baltimore (McCormick, Domino Sugar, Esskay). In the Decker Gallery, the Milestone wall documents inventions and processes discovered first in Baltimore, and Maryland. The BMI is also home to the Baltimore, the oldest surviving steam tugboat and a National Historic Landmark that dates to 1906.

The library consists of over 5,000 volumes of rare and historic books. The manuscript collections cover all major industries in Baltimore including canning, the cloth trades, violin making, and the steel industry. The photographic collections consist of more than 250,000 prints and negatives, including the Baltimore Gas and Electric Company Print and Negative Collection.

=== Tours and special activities ===
The museum hosts guided tours with hands-on activities for children. Students can become workers in a garment loft and in the Kids Cannery to learn what life was like at the end of the 19th century and at the beginning of the 20th century. The museum rents the galleries and a pavilion on the water for private events.

== History ==
The museum was founded in 1977 as a project by the Mayor's office to preserve the industrial history of downtown Baltimore.

== Location ==
The museum is located on the site of the old Platt Oyster Cannery on the North-west branch of the Patapsco River at 1415 Key Highway, Baltimore, MD 21230. The museum leases its docks to the Downtown Sailing Center, a local community sailing organization. Additionally, the BMI hosts weddings on its grounds.
