= Standard Oil Company No. 16 =

Historic tugboat

No. 16
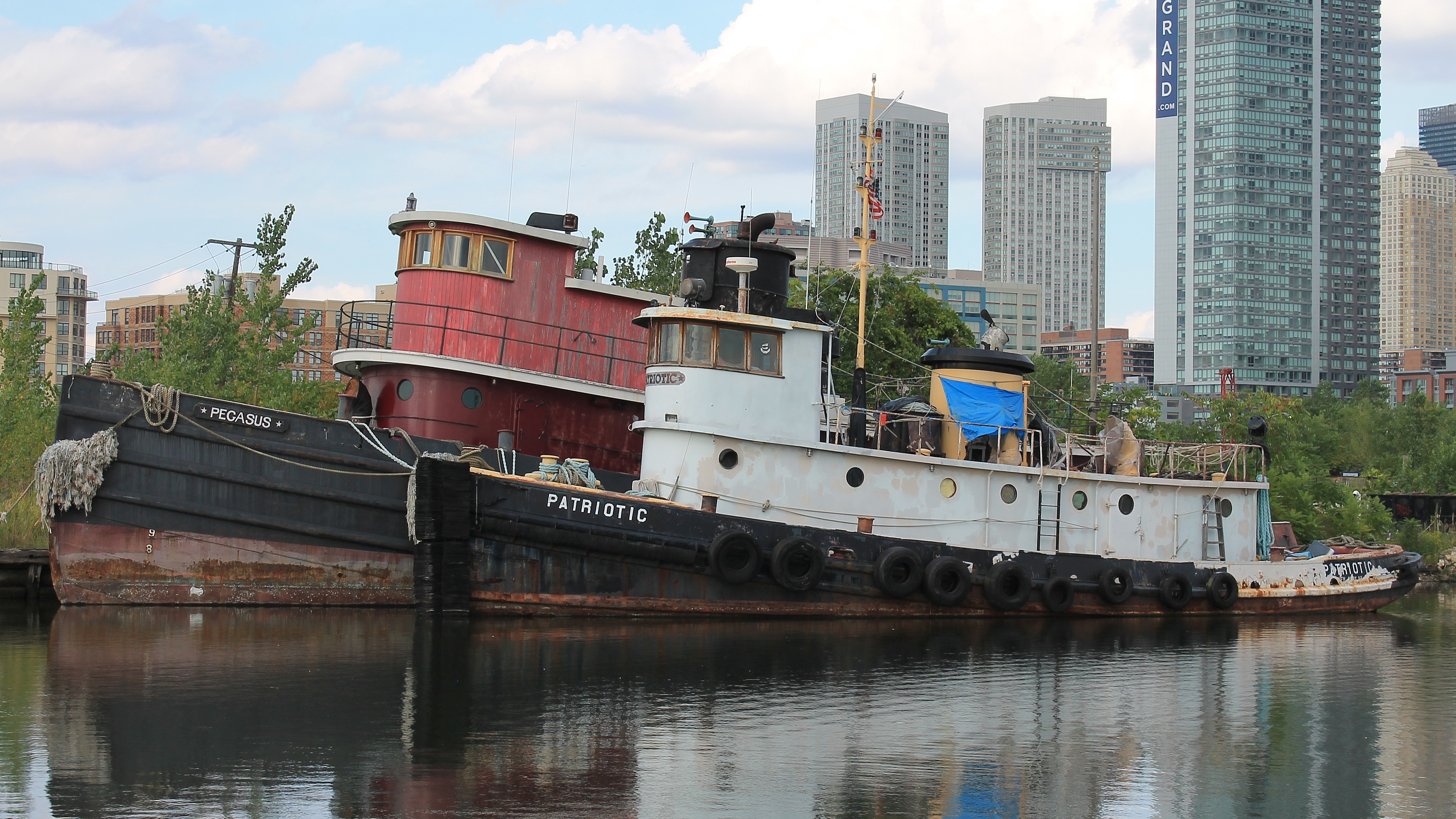
- Pegasus moored inboard of the tug Patriotic in Morris Canal Basin, September 2019.

History
- Owner: Standard Oil Company (1907–1915); Standard Transportation Company (1915–1947); Esso Shipping (1947–c.1953); McAllister Towing and Transportation Company (c.1953–); Hepburn Marine (1987-2021)
- Builder: Skinner Shipbuilding and Dry Dock Company
- Launched: 1907
- Renamed: SOCONY 16 (1915); Esso Tug No. 1 (1947) John E. McAllister (c.1953); Pegasus (1987)
- Identification: IMO number: 5173498
- Fate: Scrapped in 2021

General characteristics
- Type: Tugboat
- Tonnage: 175 GT
- Length: 100 ft (30 m)
- Beam: 23 ft (7.0 m)
- Depth: 11.2 ft (3.4 m)
- Installed power: Steam (1907–c.1953); Diesel (c.1953–)
- Standard Oil Company No. 16 (harbor tug)
- Formerly listed on the U.S. National Register of Historic Places
- Location within New York City
- Location: 3001 Richmond Terrace, Staten Island, New York
- Coordinates: 40°38′18″N 74°9′35″W
- Built: 1907
- Architect: Skinner Shipbuilding & Dry Dock Co.
- Architectural style: harbor tug
- NRHP reference No.: 01001321

Significant dates
- Added to NRHP: 29 November 2001
- Removed from NRHP: 7 June 2024

Standard Oil Company No. 16, later Pegasus, was a historic harbor tugboat located at Morris Canal Basin, Jersey City, New Jersey. She was built in 1907 by the Skinner Shipbuilding and Dry Dock Company of Baltimore, Maryland for the Standard Oil Company. She had heavy steel frames and deck beams. She was 100 feet in length, 23 feet in beam and 11.2 feet in depth. She was registered at 175 gross tons. She had an original wooden pilot house and the engine room dated to 1953-1954 when converted from steam to diesel. At that time, Standard Oil sold the tug to the McAllister Towing and Transportation Company and she was renamed McAllister 41. In 1955, she was renamed John E. McAllister.

Pamela Hepburn acquired the tug in 1987 and renamed her Pegasus. She served with Hepburn in commercial service for 10 years until her retirement in 1997. Subsequently, efforts were made to preserve the 90-year-old tug, and she was listed on the National Register of Historic Places in 2001. Pegasus was docked at Pier 25 in Manhattan as a museum ship for 13 years, but the preservation group began running into funding problems around 2015, and the tug had to be moved to Morris Canal Basin in Jersey City. Ultimately the group was unable to continue to maintain Pegasus, and she was towed to Staten Island for scrapping in March 2021. She was delisted from the National Register in 2024.

== See also ==
- National Register of Historic Places listings in Staten Island
